= 2022 in Croatian television =

List of years in Croatian television
- … 2010; 2011; 2012; 2013; 2014; 2015; 2016; 2017; 2018; 2019; 2020; 2021; 2022; 2023; 2024; 2025; 2026; 2027; 2028; 2029; 2030 …
- Art; Archaeology; Architecture; Literature; Music; Philosophy; Science; +...

This is a list of Croatian television related events from 2022.

== Events ==
- 19 February – Mia Dimšić wins Dora 2022.

== Programs ==
=== Programs continuing in 2022 ===
First aired	Title	Season	Network	Genre	Ref.
6 March	Ples sa zvijezdama	10	Nova TV	Reality show	
7 March	Dođi, pogodi, osvoji	2	RTL	Game show	
14 March	Survivor	3	Nova TV	Reality show	
21 March	Gospodin Savršeni	3	RTL	Reality show	
21 March	Večera za 5	15	RTL	Reality show	
8 May	Ljubav je na selu	14	RTL	Reality show	
19 September	MasterChef Croatia	5	Nova TV	Reality show	
24 September	Supertalent	9	Nova TV	Reality show	
25 September	Volim Hrvatsku	10	HRT 1	Game show	
26 September	Život na vagi	6	RTL	Reality show	
31 December	Mrkomir Prvi	2	HRT 1	Comedy	

=== Programs debuting in 2022 ===
First aired	Title	Network	Genre	Ref.
7 February	Kumovi	Soap opera	Nova TV	
2 April	Masked Singer	RTL	Reality show	
26 September	Metropolitanci	HRT 1	Drama	
28 November	Kad smo bili mali	RTL Kockica	Talk show	
