= 2020 in Croatian television =

List of years in Croatian television
- … 2010; 2011; 2012; 2013; 2014; 2015; 2016; 2017; 2018; 2019; 2020; 2021; 2022; 2023; 2024; 2025; 2026; 2027; 2028; 2029; 2030 …
- Art; Archaeology; Architecture; Literature; Music; Philosophy; Science; +...

This is a list of Croatian television related events from 2020.

== Events ==
- 29 February – Damir Kedžo wins Dora 2020.

== Programs ==
=== Programs continuing 2020 ===
First aired	Title	Season	Network	Genre	Ref.
27 January	Večera za 5	11	RTL	Reality show	
9 February	Ljubav je na selu	12	RTL	Reality show	
2 March	Novine	3	HRT 1	Drama	
8 March	Tvoje lice zvuči poznato	6	Nova TV	Reality show	
3 September	Provjereno	14	Nova TV		
7 September	Potjera	8	HRT 1	Game show	
22 September	U svom filmu	4	HRT 1	Talk show	
27 September	Volim Hrvatsku	8	HRT 1	Game show	
3 October	Zvijezde pjevaju	9	HRT 1	Reality show	
5 October	Farma	7	Nova TV	Reality show	
17 October	Život na vagi	5	RTL	Reality show	
14 December	Crno-bijeli svijet	4	HRT 1	Dramedy	

=== Programs debuting in 2020 ===
First aired	Title	Network	Genre	Ref.
16 March	Brak na prvu	RTL	Reality show	
5 October	Dar mar	Nova TV	Telenovela	
9 November	Blago nama	RTL	Comedy	
31 December	Mrkomir Prvi	HRT 1	Comedy	
