= 2021 in Croatian television =

List of years in Croatian television
- … 2010; 2011; 2012; 2013; 2014; 2015; 2016; 2017; 2018; 2019; 2020; 2021; 2022; 2023; 2024; 2025; 2026; 2027; 2028; 2029; 2030 …
- Art; Archaeology; Architecture; Literature; Music; Philosophy; Science; +...

This is a list of Croatian television related events from 2021.

== Events ==
- 13 February – Albina wins Dora 2021.

== Programs ==
=== Programs continuing in 2021 ===
First aired	Title	Season	Network	Genre	Ref.
11 April	Ljubav je na selu	13	RTL	Reality show	
21 April	Tvoje lice zvuči poznato	7	Nova TV	Reality show	
20 September	MasterChef Croatia	4	Nova TV	Reality series	
21 September	U svom filmu	5	HRT 1	Talk show	
23 September	Tko želi biti milijunaš?	11	HRT 1	Game show	
24 September	5.com s Danielom	3	HRT 1	Talk show	
26 September	Supertalent	8	Nova TV	Reality show	
12 October	Brak na prvu	2	RTL	Reality show	
29 November	Blago nama	2	RTL	Comedy	
19 December	Mrkomir Prvi	1 (Note: The pilot episode for the series aired in 2020.)	HRT 1	Comedy	

=== Programs debuting in 2021 ===
First aired	Title	Network	Genre	Ref.
8 March	Dnevnik velikog Perice	HRT 1	Comedy	
12 September	Bogu iza nogu	Nova TV	Comedy	
26 September	Minus i plus	HRT 1	Sitcom	
11 October	Dođi, pogodi, osvoji	RTL	Game show	
19 November	Kockićeve priče	RTL Kockica	Children's series	
24 November	Direktor svemira	RTL	Game show	

== Deaths ==
- 20 January – Mira Furlan, actress
- 21 October – Žarko Potočnjak, actor
