= 2024 in Croatian television =

This is a list of Croatian television related events from 2024.

== Events ==
- 27 January – Martin Kosovec wins the fourth season of The Voice Hrvatska.
- 25 February – Baby Lasagna wins Dora 2024.
- 11 May – Baby Lasagna places second at the Eurovision Song Contest 2024, marking Croatia's best Eurovision placement to date.
- 15 July – HRT 2 launched in UHD ahead of the 2024 Summer Olympics.

== Programs ==
=== Programs continuing in 2024 ===
First aired	Title	Season	Network	Genre	Ref.
15 January	Kumovi	3	Nova TV	Telenovela	
29 January	Brak na prvu	4	RTL	Reality show	
3 March	Tvoje lice zvuči poznato	8	Nova TV	Reality show	
4 March	Survivor	5	Nova TV	Reality show	
11 March	Superpotjera	2	HRT 1	Game show	
11 March	Oblak u službi zakona	2	HRT 1	Comedy	
30 March	Zvijezde pjevaju	13	HRT 1	Reality show	
30 April	Kumovi	4	Nova TV	Telenovela	
2 September	Život na vagi	8	RTL	Reality show	
5 September	Provjereno	18	Nova TV	Documentary	
9 September	Ljubav je na selu	17	RTL	Reality show	
15 September	MasterChef Croatia	7	Nova TV	Reality show	
28 September	Superstar	2	RTL	Reality show	
29 September	Supertalent	11	Nova TV	Reality show	
2 October	Mrkomir Prvi	4	HRT 1	Comedy	
7 October	Knjiga ili život	12	HRT 3	Talk show	
28 October	Dosje Jarak	2	Voyo	Documentary	
12 November	Sretni gradovi	2	HRT 1	Documentary	
13 November	Godina za pamćenje	2	HRT 1	Game show	
13 November	Planine	2	HRT 1	Documentary	
18 November	Kad smo bili mali	3	RTL Kockica	Talk show	
2 December	Dnevnik velikog Perice	2	HRT 1	Comedy	

=== Programs debuting in 2024 ===
First aired	Title	Network	Genre	Ref.
23 January	Na Magistrali	HRT 1	Documentary	
24 January	Sretan put	HRT 1	Documentary	
31 January	Hell's Kitchen Hrvatska	RTL	Reality show	
26 February	Joker	Nova TV	Game show	
15 March	Tko to tamo pjeva?	Nova TV	Game show	
22 April	Psi na zadatku	HRT 1	Documentary	
27 July	Fight of Nations: Put do pobjede	Voyo	Reality show	
2 September	Sjene prošlosti	RTL	Drama	
9 September	U dobru i zlu	Nova TV	Telenovela	
30 September	Bijeli put	HRT 1	Drama	
27 October	Sram	HRT 1	Teen drama	
28 December	The Voice Kids Hrvatska	HRT 1	Talent show	

=== Milestone episodes and anniversaries ===
- 19 May – Nedjeljom u 2 airs its 1000th episode.

== Deaths ==
- 9 June – Duško Valentić, actor
- 25 November – Žarko Savić, actor
