= 2025 in Croatian television =

This is a list of Croatian television related events from 2025.

== Events ==
- 14 January–2 February – RTL broadcasts the 2025 World Men's Handball Championship held in Croatia, Denmark and Norway.
- 20 January – N1 Hrvatska has announced a restructuring process aimed at addressing financial challenges and ensuring long-term sustainability, which has resulted in the termination of 26 employees.
- 15 February – Marino Vrgoč wins the first season of The Voice Kids Hrvatska.
- 2 March – Marko Bošnjak wins Dora 2025, the Croatian national final for Eurovision Song Contest 2025.
- 27 March – Nova TV's concession to broadcast television programming at the national level was extended for another twenty years.
- 11 April – Večernjak's Rose Awards ceremony is broadcast on HRT 1.

=== Future events ===
- Late 2025 – Croatia is set to participate at Junior Eurovision Song Contest 2025, marking its first participation after a ten-year absence from the contest.

== Programs ==
=== Programs continuing in 2025 ===
Start date	Title	Season	Network	Genre	Ref.
27 January	Gospodin Savršeni	4	Voyo / RTL	Reality show	
17 February	Metropolitanci	2	HRT 1	Drama	
3 March	Survivor	6	Nova TV	Reality show	
7 March	Tko to tamo pjeva?	2	Nova TV	Game show	
9 March	Tvoje lice zvuči poznato	9	Nova TV	Reality show	
17 March	Dođi, pogodi, osvoji	4	RTL	Game show	
24 March	Brak na prvu	5	RTL	Reality show	
31 March	Oblak u službi zakona	3	HRT 1	Comedy	
26 April	Sram	2	HRT 1	Teen drama	
19 May	Farma	8	Voyo / RTL	Reality show	
1 September	Sjene prošlosti	2	RTL	Drama	
1 September	Život na vagi	9	RTL	Reality show	
15 September	MasterChef Croatia	8	Nova TV	Reality show	
28 September	Supertalent	12	Nova TV	Reality show	
3 November	Ljubav je na selu	18	RTL	Reality show	
22 November	The Voice Kids Hrvatska	2	HRT 1	Reality show	

=== Programs debuting in 2025 ===
Start date	Title	Network	Genre	Ref.
6 January	Pijaca, pazar, plac	HRT 1	Documentary	
14 January	Sanjari Hrvatske	HRT 1	Documentary	
28 January	Oči sokolove	HRT 1	Documentary	
24 March	Cocktail Master	Voyo	Reality show	
30 March	MagNet	RTL	Television magazine	
14 April	Pobjednici	HRT 1	Documentary	
3 June	Zeleni heroji	RTL	Education	
29 September	Blaž među ženama	HRT 1	Comedy	
3 November	Divlje pčele	RTL	Family drama	
1 December	Cash or Trash	Nova TV	Auction game show	

=== Milestone episodes and anniversaries ===
- 20 April – RTL's late night news show RTL Direkt marks ten years of broadcasting. A special episode commemorating the anniversary aired on 24 April.
