= 2026 in Croatian television =

This is a list of Croatian television related events from 2026.

== Events ==
- 17 January – Nikol Kutnjak wins the second season of The Voice Kids Hrvatska.
- 31 January – HRT broadcasts Zlatni Studio awards show.
- 15 February – The finale of Dora 2026.
- 15 July – Disney+ received Croatian-language localization.

== Programs ==
=== Programs continuing in 2026 ===
Start date	Title	Season	Network	Genre	Ref.
10 January	Sram	3	HRT 1	Teen drama	
26 January	Gospodin Savršeni	5	Voyo / RTL	Reality show	
16 February	Znamo li što jedemo?	2	HRT 1	Documentary	
2 March	Survivor	7	Nova TV	Reality show	
8 March	Tvoje lice zvuči poznato	10	Nova TV	Reality show	
17 March	Mrkomir Prvi	5	HRT 1	Comedy	
20 April	Pobjednici	2	HRT 1	Documentary	
22 July	Direktor svemira	2	RTL	Game show	
14 September	Kod nas doma	10	HRT 1	Talk show	
14 September	MasterChef Croatia	9	Nova TV	Reality show	
14 September	Potjera	14	HRT 1	Game show	
21 September	Divlje pčele	2	RTL	Drama	
27 September	Supertalent	13	Nova TV	Reality show	
2 October	Tko to tamo pjeva?	3	Nova TV	Game show	
4 October	Superpotjera	4	HRT 1	Game show	
31 October	Ples sa zvijezdama	12	HRT 1	Reality show	
TBA	Sram	4	HRT 1	Teen drama	

=== Programs debuting in 2026 ===
Start date	Title	Network	Genre	Ref.
13 April	Igra chefova	RTL	Reality show	
16 April	Tko bi rekao?	RTL	Game show	
20 April	Gdje je nestalo? Ili nije?	HRT 1	Documentary	
29 April	Eurosong 70: Naši ljudi, naše pjesme	HRT 1	Documentary	
24 July	IQ 160	Voyo	Crime comedy	
6 September	Slučajna obitelj	Nova TV	Comedy drama	
7 September	Specijalisti Zagreb	RTL	Crime	
8 September	Asia Express: Zmajeva ruta	RTL	Reality game show	
13 September	Love Island Adria	Voyo	Reality show	
28 September	Savršena mjesta sa Sašom Šekoranjom	HRT 1	Documentary	
1 October	Putoknjaz	HRT 1	Documentary	
8 October	Ponovno zajedno	HRT 1	Talk show	
