= EWN =

EWN may refer to:

== People ==
- Ewn Garabandal (born 1978), Lombard novelist

== Other uses ==
- Coastal Carolina Regional Airport, North Carolina, United States
- EuroWeekly News, an English-language newspaper in Spain
- Eyewitness News (South Africa), a South African news publisher
- EuroWorld Network, now eMedia Network, an American media company
- EWNetwork (Etika World Network), Desmond Amofah's YouTube channel between 2012 and 2018

== See also ==
- Eyewitness News, a style of news broadcasting
