= Lorena Nosić =

Croatian voice actress

- Occupations: Television host; voice actress
- Years active: 2006–present
- Known for: Zabranjena ljubav; Ljubav je na selu

Lorena Nosić is a Croatian voice actress and a former television host.

== Career ==
Lorena Nosić gained notability in the 2000s for playing Mirna Šarić in Zabranjena ljubav, the first Croatian soap opera that ran on RTL. She also played Martina Treer in Obični ljudi. On RTL, she hosted Večera za 5, the Croatian iteration of Come Dine With Me. From 2008 to 2010, she hosted the first two seasons of Ljubav je na selu, the Croatian edition of Farmer Wants a Wife. In 2012, she hosted the game show 20pet on HRT. In the early 2010s, she left television to work as a radio host. She won the title of Miss Radio in 2018.

Following her departure from on-screen roles, Nosić ventured into voice acting and has appeared in Croatian dubs of various television series and films. She voiced Bloom, the main protagonist of the animated series Winx Club, from its third season onward. Nosić is a prominent voice in the Croatian version of Nickelodeon's productions; her roles include Jade West in Victorious, Phoebe Thunderman in The Thundermans franchise, Karen in SpongeBob SquarePants, Carlota Casagrande in The Loud House and Kelly Wainwright in Big Time Rush.

== Personal life ==
Her partner, Marko Đurković, is a rally driver. Nosić participated in rally competitions with him, serving as his co-driver. In 2024, she hosted the conference titled Women behind the wheel in motorsport – prejudice or the future?, which discussed the position of women in auto racing. Nosić and Đurković have two children.

== Filmography ==
=== Television ===
Year	Title	Role	Notes
2006–2007	Obični ljudi	Martina Treer	—
2006–2008	Zabranjena ljubav	Mirna Šarić	Main role; over 100 episodes
2008–2009	Večera za 5	Herself	Host
2008–2010	Ljubav je na selu	Herself	Host; seasons 1–2
2012	20pet	Herself	Host

=== Voice acting ===
Lorena Nosić's voice work in Croatian dubs
Year	Title	Role	Notes
2010–2015	Winx Club	Bloom	Seasons 3–7; TV Specials
2011–2012	iCarly	Various roles	—
2011	PopPixie	Fixit	—
2011–present	SpongeBob SquarePants	Karen	—
2011–2013	Victorious	Jade West	—
2011–2013	Big Time Rush	Kelly Wainwright	—
2013–2018	The Thundermans	Phoebe Thunderman	Main role
2017	The Loud House	Carlota Casagrande	—
2021	DC Super Hero Girls	Selina Kyle / Catwoman	—
2021	He's All That	Anna Sawyer	—
2021	Yes Day	Allison Torres	Main role
2022	Spirit Riding Free	Maricela	—
2023	Heartstopper	Sarah Nielsen	Season 2
2024	The Thundermans Return	Phoebe Thunderman	Main role
2025–present	The Thundermans: Undercover	Phoebe Thunderman	Main role
