= RTL 2 (Croatia) =

- Country: Croatia
- Headquarters: Zagreb

Programming
- Picture format: 16:9 1080i (HDTV)

Ownership
- Owner: RTL Hrvatska (CME)
- Sister channels: RTL; RTL Kockica; RTL Living; RTL Crime; RTL Passion; RTL Adria; RTL Croatia World

History
- Launched: January 2, 2011; 15 years ago

Links
- Website: www.rtl.hr

Availability

Terrestrial
- OiV: MUX M1

Streaming media
- Affiliated Streaming Service: Voyo

RTL 2 is a Croatian commercial broadcaster with national availability, launched on January 2, 2011. The station was supposed to launch in 2010; however, the launch date was pushed to 2011, during the New Year's Eve.

== Programming aired by RTL 2 ==
=== Series and Miniseries ===
==== Airing currently ====
- Anger Management (all seasons)
- Cold Case (all seasons)
- Criminal Minds (all seasons)
- Fringe (all seasons)
- How I Met Your Mother (all seasons)
- K.T.2 – Pravda na zadatku (all seasons)
- Krv nije voda (all seasons)
- Hawaii Five-0 (all seasons)
- House (all seasons)
- Rules of Engagement (all seasons)
- The Big Bang Theory (all seasons)
- Two and a Half Men (8 seasons)
- Will & Grace (all seasons)
- Without a Trace (all seasons)
- Zabranjena ljubav (all seasons)
- Friends (all seasons)
- NCIS: Los Angeles (all seasons)
- NCIS: New Orleans (all seasons)

==== Hiatus ====
- Chuck (seasons 1–2 aired)
- Cobra 11 (seasons 1–20 aired)
- Dexter (seasons 1–2 aired)
- Elementary (seasons 1–3 aired)
- Grey's Anatomy (season 1–11 aired)
- Jerseylicious (s1 aired)
- Keeping Up with the Kardashians (s1 aired)
- Modern Family (seasons 1–6 aired)
- Weeds (seasons 1–3 aired)

==== Ended ====
- 8 Simple Rules (end)
- According to Jim (ended)
- 'Allo 'Allo! (ended)
- Aurora (ended)
- Bella Calamidades (ended)
- Better Off Ted (ended)
- Desperate Housewives (ended)
- Dollhouse (ended)
- El Clon (ended)
- Everybody Loves Raymond (ended)
- Family Matters (ended)
- The Koala Brothers (ended)
- Looney Tunes (ended)
- Malcolm in the Middle (ended)
- Miami Vice (ended)
- Najljepše bajke svijeta (ended)
- Nip/Tuck (ended)
- Pasión de gavilanes (ended)
- Prison Break (ended)
- Southland (ended)
- Terminator: The Sarah Connor Chronicles (ended)
- Super Mario Bros (ended)
- The Ex List (ended)
- The King of Queens (ended)
- The War at Home (ended)
- 'Til Death (ended)
- United States of Tara (ended)
- Without a Trace (ended)
- You Rang, M'Lord? (ended)
- Žene s broja 13 (ended)

=== Reality and documentary shows ===
==== Airing currently ====
- Pawn Stars (all seasons)
- Modern Marvels (all seasons)
- Storage Wars (all seasons)
- Storage Wars: Texas (all seasons)
- Top Gear (all seasons)

==== Ended ====
- Ax Men (ended)
- Dallas SWAT (ended)
- Extraordinary Dogs (ended)
- Heston's Feasts (ended)
- Ice Road Truckers (ended)
- Life After People (ended)
- Police Camera Action! (ended)
- Ramsay's Kitchen Nightmares (ended)

==== Croatian reality and documentary shows ====
- Koledžicom po svijetu
- Mijau, vau!
- Mjenjačnica
- Punom parom
- Studio 45
- Učilica
- Večera za 5
- Survivor: Kostarika

=== Sports ===
- RTL Liga
- Formula One (race highlights)
- Red Bull Air Race

== See also ==
- RTL Televizija
- Central European Media Enterprises
