= RTL Croatia World =

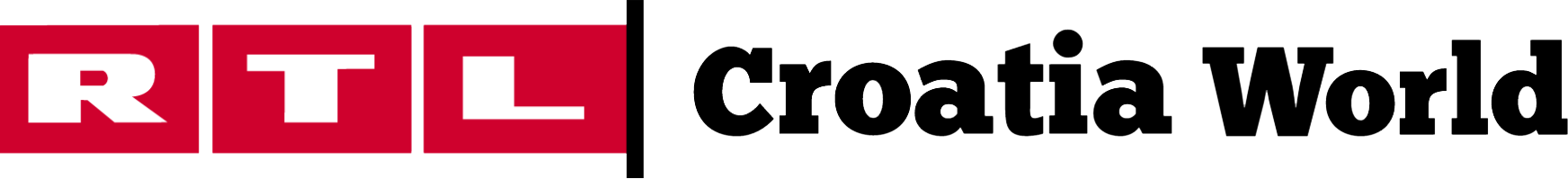
- Country: Croatia
- Broadcast area: Worldwide
- Headquarters: Zagreb, Croatia

Programming
- Language: Croatian
- Picture format: 576i (16:9 SDTV)

Ownership
- Owner: RTL Hrvatska (CME)
- Sister channels: RTL; RTL 2 RTL Kockica; RTL Living; RTL Crime; RTL Passion

History
- Launched: 11 July 2016; 9 years ago

Links
- Website: www.rtl.hr

RTL Croatia World is an international TV channel dedicated to Croats living outside Croatia operated by the CME Group as of 1 June 2022. The channel was launched on 11 July 2016.

RTL Croatia World focuses its programming on news and entertainment, bringing the shows and series of RTL Televizija, RTL 2 and RTL Kockica to its audience.

== Distribution ==
The channel is available via Euro World Network in North America, Canada, Australia and New Zealand, A1 Telekom Austria in Austria, Flip TV in Australia, SBB in Serbia and via NetTV Plus.
