= EMedia Network =

eMedia Network, Inc.
- Type: Private company
- Industry: Media
- Founded: 2005
- Headquarters: San Diego, California, United States
- Key people: Chris Williams, President & CEO; Karina Getzlaff, Vice President & CFO
- Products: Ethnic broadcasting
- Owner: Chris Williams
- Website: eMedia Network

eMedia Network, Inc. (EWN) is an American-based media company that markets and distributes various international television and radio services to ethnic viewers in North America as well as Australia & New Zealand. It was founded in February 2005 and is based in San Diego, California.

In 2015, EuroWorld Network underwent a corporate re-branding, the company was renamed eMedia Network.

Euro World Network logo

eMedia Network currently distributes over 20 television channels and 2 radio stations catering to the following ethnic groups: Croatian, Hungarian, Macedonian and Serbian.

== Offices ==
Headquarters

- United States: San Diego
- Australia: Sydney

Sales offices

- Canada: Vancouver and Toronto
- Croatia: Zagreb
- Hungary: Budapest
- Serbia: Belgrade

== Channels ==
=== Croatian ===
- Slika Hrvatske†
- Voice of Croatia†
- Klasik TV‡
- Laudato TV‡
- Nova World†
- Posavina TV‡
- RTL Croatia World‡
- RTL Televizija†
- Sportska TV‡
- Z1

=== Hungarian ===
- Duna TV‡
- Duna World†
- Echo TV‡
- Hír TV‡
- M1‡
- M2‡
- M4 Sport‡
- RTL+‡
- RTL II‡
- RTL Klub‡
- TV2‡

=== Macedonian ===
- Alfa TV‡
- ERA TV‡
- MRT 1†
- MRT 2†

=== Serbian ===
- DM Sat‡
- K3‡
- OTV Valentino‡
- Pink‡
- RTS Sat†
- Radio Belgrade†
- RTRS‡
- RTV 1‡
- RTV 2‡
- SerbianTV-America

NOTE:

† - Available via Satellite & IPTV
‡ - Available via IPTV only

== Availability ==
eMedia Network channels are distributed via satellite on the following platforms: Galaxy-19 at 97°W (North America coverage) and Optus D2 at 152° East (Australia and New Zealand coverage). In addition, eMedia Network operate its own IPTV platform iON, which is available in North America and Australia. The IPTV service originally launched in partnership with Canadian ethnic broadcaster Ethnic Channels Group as NEXTV America & NEXTV Australia. However, in 2015 the service was re-launched as iON with eMedia Network taking over full control alongside new broadcast partner GSS Media.

== World Media International ==
On August 21, 2013, eMedia Network announced a partnership with Australian Pay-TV provider World Media International to create an IPTV platform for their services. Through this agreement EWN distributed the following channels for WMI via IPTV:

- Arabic (Al Hayat TV 2, Al Kahera wa Al Nas, Al Jadeed, Al Jazeera, Al Jazeera Sports, Al Tahrir TV, ART Hekayat, ART Movies, ART Variety, BBC Arabic, Cima Channel, Future News, Future Television, Iqraa TV, MBC, Melody Arabia Murr Television, Noursat, OTV & Syria Drama)
- Greek (ANT1 Pacific & Greek Cinema)
- Italian (Mediaset Italia, Rai Italia & Rai News24)
- Polish (Toya TV, TV Trwam, TVP Info, TVP Polonia, TVS)

As of 2017, these channels are no longer distributed by eMedia Network.

== See also ==
- Intelsat
- Globecast Australia
