= Ewn Garabandal =

Italian novelist

Fabio Ghezzi
- Born: 1978 (age 47–48); Monza, province of Monza e Brianza, Lombardy, Italy
- Education: Industrial Design, Politecnico di Milano
- Occupations: Writer, journalist, designer
- Writing career
- Pen name: Ewn Garabandal, Ewan McWallace
- Period: 2007–present
- Genre: Fantasy
- Notable work: Feha Gìbuss
- Website: www.fabioghezzi.com

Ewn Garabandal (born May 29, 1978) is a Lombard novelist, best known for his novel "Feha Gìbuss e il Libro della Profezia" (Feha Gìbuss and the Book of Prophecy), a fantasy book about angels and demons, originally published in hardcover in 2007 (Mursia, Milan).

== Biography ==
Ewn Garabandal is a pen name used by Fabio Ghezzi, an Italian writer, journalist and designer born in Monza in 1978. He graduated at San Giuseppe Institute from Monza with a major in Arts. From 1995 to 1998 he collaborated with the local newspaper from Monza, the "Cittadino". From 1997 to 2004 he collaborated with the "Gruppo Netweek" journals writing the Sports column. Since 1997 he has been enrolled in the Lombardy journalist register. In the late 90s he moved to London and worked as a bartender. In 2004 he graduated in Industrial Design at the Politechincs of Milano II Bovisa, with the highest grades of 110/110. In August 2007 he experienced the Santiago de Compostela pilgrimage starting from Saint Jean-Pie-De-Port and walking for 780 km, as to follow the primary path.

== Publication history ==
In 2007 Garabandal (under the pseudonym of Ewn Garaban) made his debut with the editor Ugo Mursia from Milan with the fantasy novel entitled "Feha Gìbuss e il Libro della Profezia". In April 2009 the black novel named "Cadde l'Angelo" was published, still for those of Mursia. In 2009 he also completed the first draft of his third novel, which was temporary entitled "MM", and was working on two other projects.

== Bibliography ==
=== Novels ===
- Feha Gìbuss e il Libro della Profezia, Mursia, Milan (2007)
- Cadde l'Angelo, Mursia, Milan (2009)
