= Dosje Jarak =

- Genre: True crime
- Created by: Andrija Jarak
- Country of origin: Croatia
- Original language: Croatian
- No. of seasons: 4
- No. of episodes: 15

Production
- Running time: 60 minutes

Original release
- Network: RTL
- Release: 2 November 2023 – 15 February 2024
- Network: Voyo
- Release: 28 October 2024 – present

Dosje Jarak (Croatian for 'The Jarak File') is a Croatian true crime documentary television series created by Andrija Jarak. The series explores some of the most memorable crimes that happened in Croatia.

Dosje Jarak premiered on 2 November 2023 on RTL. The series was moved to RTL's streaming service Voyo for its second season, which premiered on 28 October 2024. The third season aired on Voyo from 23 October to 18 December 2025. The fourth season premiered on 12 November 2026.

== Episodes ==
=== Series overview ===
Season	Episodes	Originally released		
Season	Episodes	First released	Last released	Network
1	4	2 November 2023	15 February 2024	RTL
2	5	28 October 2024	10 February 2025	Voyo
3	5	23 October 2025	18 December 2025	Voyo
4	2	12 November 2026	TBA	Voyo

=== Season 1 (2023–2024) ===
No. overall	No. in season	Title	Original release date
1	1	"Atentat na Ivu Pukanića"	2 November 2023
2	2	"Atentat na Ivu Pukanića"	9 November 2023
3	3	"Ubojstvo Ivane Hodak"	14 December 2023
4	4	"Generalov zločin"	15 February 2024

=== Season 2 (2024–2025) ===
No. overall	No. in season	Title	Original release date
5	1	"Rođeni ubojica (1)"	28 October 2024
6	2	"Rođeni ubojica (2)"	4 November 2024
7	3	"Gdje je Martina Horvat?"	9 December 2024
Andrija Jarak and Dario Todorović tell the story of the disappearance of Martina Horvat, a girl who mysteriously disappeared from her home address almost 15 years ago, and has not been found ever since.
8	4	"Trovači iz Plaškog"	13 January 2025
The episode focuses on a couple from Plaški, who had been poisoning their fellow villagers for years.
9	5	"Leš u kauču"	10 February 2025

=== Season 3 (2025) ===
No. overall	No. in season	Title	Original release date
10	1	"Zver"	23 October 2025
11	2	"Zver 2"	30 October 2025
12	3	"Pljačka stoljeća"	20 November 2025
13	4	"Sarajevski kartel"	11 December 2025
14	5	"Sarajevski kartel 2"	18 December 2025

=== Season 4 (2026) ===
No. overall	No. in season	Title	Original release date
15	1	"Drniš: Povratak zla"	12 November 2026
The fourth season opens with the murder of a young pizza delivery driver in Drniš perpetrated by Kristijan Aleksić, examining how the crime could have been prevented and revealing new details about Aleksić’s earlier murder.
16	2	"Hadžija"	10 December 2026
