= Tko bi rekao? =

- The official logo for the series
- Genre: Game show
- Based on: Wer weiß denn sowas?
- Presented by: Matija Kačan
- Country of origin: Croatia
- Original language: Croatian
- No. of seasons: 1
- No. of episodes: 8

Production
- Running time: 60 minutes

Original release
- Network: RTL
- Release: 16 April – 4 June 2026

Tko bi rekao? (Croatian for 'Who Would Have Said?') is a Croatian game show television series based on the German format of Wer weiß denn sowas?. Hosted by Matija Kačan, the game show features Borko Perić and Meri Goldašić as team captains, as they are each joined by a celebrity in order to answer trivia questions and earn money.

The series premiered on 16 April 2026 on RTL and its streaming service Voyo.

== Format ==
The format of the show is based on a competition between two teams that, across several rounds, answer questions and solve tasks of different types. Points are awarded according to accuracy or successful completion. Team captains participate on equal terms with the guests, and the flow of the game includes elements of improvisation and quick decision‑making, depending on the task. The studio audience acts as an additional participant, as it receives a prize if the team it supports achieves the overall victory.

== Episodes ==
No.	Title	Team Meri Goldašić	Team Borko Perić	Original release date
1	"Episode 1"	Laura Gnjatović	Šime Elez	16 April 2026
2	"Episode 2"	Stjepan Ursa	Domenica Žuvela	23 April 2026
3	"Episode 3"	Vlado Šola	Maja Bajamić	30 April 2026
4	"Episode 4"	Marko Pecotić	Lorena Bućan	7 May 2026
5	"Episode 5"	Pino Pingvino	Damir Kedžo	14 May 2026
6	"Episode 6"	Arija Rizvić	Marko Vargek	21 May 2026
7	"Episode 7"	Dalibor Petko	Andrea Andrassy	28 May 2026
8	"Episode 8"	Sandra Bagarić	Josip Ivančić	4 June 2026
