= Specijalisti Zagreb =

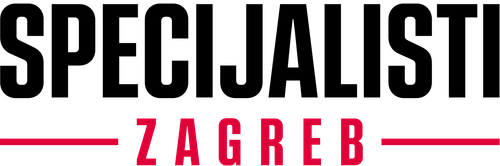
- The official logo for the series on Voyo
- Genre: Crime
- Written by: Nikola Kuprešanin; Pavo Marinković
- Directed by: Filip Heraković; Filip Mojzeš
- Starring: Peđa Gvozdić; Vini Jurčić; Toni Gojanović; Ivan Barišić
- Country of origin: Croatia
- Original language: Croatian
- No. of seasons: 1
- No. of episodes: 10

Production
- Producers: Christoph Mainusch; Iva Grahor; Heike Richter-Karst
- Production company: GAL Media

Original release
- Network: Voyo (Note: RTL aired episodes 1–2 on 7 September 2026, episodes 2–3 on 14 September 2026, and episode 5 on 25 September 2026.)
- Release: 6 September – 25 October 2026

Specijalisti Zagreb is a Croatian crime television series. Set in Zagreb, the series follows a police team solving local crime.

The series premiered on 6 September 2026 on Voyo. The television broadcast started on RTL the following day, on 7 September. After five episodes were broadcast by RTL, the series was removed from the network's schedule, and the remaining five episodes were released on Voyo only, with the series concluding on 25 October 2026.

== Plot ==
A Zagreb police team tackles a new case each episode, blending crime investigations, forensic work and complex personal dynamics across the city’s diverse neighborhoods.

== Cast and characters ==
- Peđa Gvozdić as Zoran Jukić, an instinct‑driven Zagreb police inspector and former amateur boxer whose old‑school methods, personal struggles and devotion to his daughter shape his leadership of the investigative team
- Vini Jurčić as Ana Kirin, a calm, empathetic senior inspector and Zoran’s deputy who serves as the team’s moral anchor
- Toni Gojanović as Luka Horvat, a methodical senior inspector and team analyst shaped by his Europol career
- Ivan Barišić as Toni Kovačić, the youngest inspector on the team, a impulsive and unpredictable Split native and former USKOK officer

== Episodes ==
No.	Title	Voyo release date
1	"Episode 1"	6 September 2026
During his birthday celebration, veteran Zagreb detective Zoran Jukić is called to the crime scene where a grill‑house owner named Berat Selimi was killed. Evidence leads him to Agim Bala, a Kosovo businessman with a criminal past who runs the "Clinton" betting shop. To infiltrate Agim’s operation, Zoran strikes a deal with Zec, an old acquaintance currently serving a prison sentence.
2	"Episode 2"	6 September 2026
Top tennis player Lovre Jelaska collapses during training, and his doctor, Dr. Vuković, is found dead only hours later. As investigators connect the two events, they uncover links to doping practices, hidden financial deals, and prohibited relationships.
3	"Episode 3"	13 September 2026
Ana Kirin, a police inspector, narrowly escapes an attack after someone slips drugs into her drink. The next morning, a young woman is found dead, also drugged. While her colleagues doubt her instincts, Ana connects the case to her own experience and follows a trail leading to Marin Borković
4	"Episode 4"	13 September 2026
The body of a young woman is found at a tram terminus, as investigators trace the crime to her troubled past.
5	"Episode 5"	20 September 2026
6	"Episode 6"	27 September 2026
7	"Episode 7"	4 October 2026
8	"Episode 8"	11 October 2026
9	"Episode 9"	18 October 2026
10	"Episode 10"	25 October 2026

== Production ==
On 1 June 2026, RTL announced that the filming of the series had recently begun in Zagreb. The series is directed by Filip Heraković and Filip Mojzeš, and written by Nikola Kuprešanin and Pavo Marinković. Christoph Mainusch and Iva Grahor serve as the show's executive producers, with Heike Richter-Karst as the creative producer.
