= Krv nije voda =

- Genre: Pseudo-documentary; Drama
- Opening theme: "Apologize" by Timbaland featuring OneRepublic
- Country of origin: Croatia
- Original language: Croatian
- No. of seasons: 6

Production
- Production company: Constantin Entertainment Croatia

Original release
- Network: RTL
- Release: 30 May 2011 – 28 June 2013
- Network: PLAY Premium
- Release: 2020 – 2022

Krv nije voda (Croatian for 'Blood Is Thicker Than Water') is a Croatian pseudo-documentary drama television series that chronicles everyday problems of different families or groups of people.

The series originally ran from 30 May 2011 to 28 June 2013 on RTL. It was later rebooted for RTL's streaming service PLAY Premium, where a total of fifteen new episodes was released between 2020 to 2022.

== Premise ==
Each episode features a different fictional family or a group of people that face a certain problem. The problems faced by the characters are inspired by everyday life and vary from issues such as substance abuse, gambling, child neglect, adultery and other marriage, relationship, family and youth-related issues.

The series is filmed in a documentary form with a narrator leading the viewers through the sequence of events. Each episode begins with the narrator introducing the viewers to the key characters and their conflicts. The series employs amateur actors who act out the script. Each episode usually closes with a happy ending as the characters reach an agreement or resolve their conflict.
