= Superstar (Croatian TV series) =

Croatian adaptation of the Idol franchise

- Based on: Pop Idol by Simon Fuller
- Directed by: Mario Vidosavljević; Tihomir Žarn
- Presented by: Antonija Blaće
- Judges: Tonči Huljić; Nika Turković; Severina; Filip Miletić
- Country of origin: Croatia
- Original language: Croatian
- No. of seasons: 2
- No. of episodes: 26

Production
- Executive producer: Hagen Offerman
- Producer: Siniša Premužić
- Running time: 100–150 minutes
- Production companies: Fremantle; OHT Productions

Original release
- Network: RTL
- Release: 23 September 2023 – 14 December 2024

Superstar is a Croatian reality television series based on the Idol franchise. Judged by Tonči Huljić, Nika Turković, Severina, and Filip Miletić, the series aims to look for a participant with the best singing talent. Superstar premiered on 23 September 2023 on RTL. The second season premiered on 28 September 2024.

== Background ==
Nova TV previously aired Hrvatski Idol, which ran for two seasons between 2004 and 2005. RTL, the same network that airs Superstar, previously aired Star Search Croatia which ran for three seasons between 2009 and 2011.

== Production ==
Applications for the first season were opened from December 2022 to May 2023. It was revealed that the winner of the first season will receive a €50.000 prize. The filming of the first season took place during Summer 2023. The first season was won by Hana Ivković.

Applications for the second season opened on 9 December 2023, on the day the final episode of the first season was broadcast. The filming for the second season began in late June 2024. The second season was won by Karla Miklaužić.

=== Format ===
The series consists of three stages: the auditions, the recall and live shows. In the second season, each of the four judges have the ability to award one platinum card to a select contestant during the auditions stage; the platinum card allows its recipient to advance further in the competition.

No host is present during the auditions and the recall stage; a narration provided by Baby Dooks is featured instead. The live shows of both seasons were hosted by Antonija Blaće.

=== Judges ===
The judges for the first season were revealed in June 2023. The judging panel consist of Croatian singers Severina and Nika Turković, musician and songwriter Tonči Huljić, as well as music producer Filip Miletić. In June 2024, RTL revealed that the judging panel would remain unchanged for the second season.

Judges on Superstar Hrvatska
Judge	Season	
Judge	1	2
Tonči Huljić	Main	Main
Nika Turković	Main	Main
Severina	Main	Main
Filip Miletić	Main	Main

== Series overview ==
Season	Episodes	Originally released		Winner
Season	Episodes	First released	Last released	Winner
1	12	23 September 2023	9 December 2023	Hana Ivković
2	14	28 September 2024	14 December 2024	Karla Miklaužić

=== Broadcast ===
The series premiered on 23 September 2023 and aired on Saturday at 20:15 CET. All episodes except live shows were available to watch 24 hours before their television premiere on RTL's streaming service Voyo. The second season premiered on 28 September 2024.

== Episodes ==
=== Season 1 (2023) ===
No. overall	No. in season	Title	Original release date
1	1	"Auditions 1"	23 September 2023
Advanced: Vanessa Kralj, Dora Mandić, Arijan Djemajli, Eva Brnas, Lana Rubelj, David Đorđijevski, Donat Mandić, Toni Peruško, Mary Radić; Did not advance: Muhidin Hasanović, Sanja Tomac, Filip Kapitan, Michaela Viculin, Nina Bogeski, Marko Vujević
2	2	"Auditions 2"	30 September 2023
Advanced: Nikolina Kolman, Luka Veljković, Chiara Majdenić, Maglaja Milenković, Danijela, Monika Mitevska, Ivan Vidović, Nina Abramović Dimec, Moreno Vukojević, Lana Mandarić, Niko Vujanović, Ivan Živković; Did not advance: Maria Bandov, Karlo Orbanić, Marko Tomoković, Iris Kovačić, Mauro Hrast, Eugen Bašić, Sara Spinćić
3	3	"Auditions 3"	7 October 2023
Advanced: Franka Blagus, Erika Crnković, Viktor Habazin, Davor Knežević, Anatalia Filimone Kević Zandamela, Petar Šegedin, Lora Simikić, David Balint, Andrea Jelonjić, David Amaro; Did not advance: Marko Vidović, Pino Kovačević, Mara Butina, Kristina, Aleksandra Dimitrijević, Antun Kovaćić, Tea Stojanac, David Rabar
4	4	"Auditions 4"	14 October 2023
Advanced: Deviun Juraj, Semir Draganović, Hana Ivković, Gloria Hršak, Petar Macukić, Ajda Lacković, Vanillas (Stella & Dani), Lana Domjanović, Vivien Kurtović, Rebecca Sponza; Did not advance: Filip Galović, Tihana Deanović, Gabriel, Josip Rudelić, Tončica Knez, Pjero Maltar, David Sinjeri, Nicky Vranić
5	5	"Auditions 5"	21 October 2023
Advanced: Mia Ribić, Lucija Buza, Bruno Rački, Ana Bertić, Elizabeth Zacero, Marin Novaković, Nika Švenda, Bruno Javor, Judita Štorga, Zvonimir Detelj; Did not advance: Aleksa Despotović, Anja Đurđević, Mihovil Cota, Ivan Ivanović, Loren Jeričević, Ivan Veček Vart
6	6	"Auditions 6"	20 October 2023
Advanced: Lučijano Šečić, Hana Grubić, Bruno Barišić, Mateo Resman, Nataša Đurić, Marino Jakobić, Lana Hlaban, Petar Dopater, Valentina Patrun, Ema Durić, Goran Tomić; Did not advance: Kristijan Josip Periš, Valentina Stojanović, Marko Vukmanović, Petar Dopater, Sebastijan Mrkalj
7	7	"Auditions 7"	4 November 2023
Advanced: Vito Seleši, Nikolina Družić, Patricija Špoljarić, Mark Bagarić, Dino Miklaužić, Mladenka, Lorena, Dorotea Prosnik, Leona Doknjaš, Luka Tonković, Laura Miljanić, Stefany Žužić, Luka Tomić; Did not advance: Emanuela Mažar, Zvonimir Paponja, Danko Trupinić, Tihana Čulinović, Marko Horvat, Ivan Stašević
8	8	"Recall"	11 November 2023
All participants that advanced from the first seven auditions performed once again in recall. The jury selected a Top 12 among them.: Top 12: David Amaro, Petar Šegedin, Toni Peruško, Hana Ivković, Ivan Vidović, Dino Miklaužić, Lana Mandarić, Anatalia Filimone Kević Zandamela, Mia Ribić, Vanessa Kralj, Andrea Jelonjić, and Luka Veljković
9	9	"Live Shows 1"	18 November 2023
The Top 12 contestants performed one song each. Two contestant were eliminated. Performances: Luka Veljković: "Hotel Nacional" by Dino Dvornik; Mia Ribić: "Runnin' (Lose It All)" by Naughty Boy ft. Beyoncé, Arrow Benjamin; David Amaro: "Pola Sunca" by Marija Šerifović ft. Matija Cvek; Anatalia Filimone Kević Zandamela: "Girl on Fire" by Alicia Keys; Toni Peruško: "Travelin' Band" by Creedence Clearwater Revival; Hana Ivković: "Hurt" by Christina Aguilera; Andrea Jelonjić: "Molitva" by Parni valjak; Ivan Vidović: "Be Alright" by Dean Lewis; Petar: "Kuća puna naroda" by Zdravko Čolić; Dino Miklaužić: "Are You Gonna Be My Girl" by Jet; Vanessa Kralj: "Kao" by Severina; Lana Mandarić: "You Don't Even Know Me" by Faouzia; Eliminated: David Amaro and Luka Veljković
10	10	"Live Shows 2"	25 November 2023
The Top 10 contestants performed one song each. Two contestant were eliminated. Performances: Lana Mandarić: "Ti si mi u mislima" by Dino Dvornik; Dino Miklaužić: "Što to bješe ljubav" by Oliver Dragojević; Vanessa Kralj: "Valerie" by Amy Winehouse; Anatalia Filimone Kević Zandamela: "Read All About It" by Emeli Sandé; Petar Šegedin: "'92" by Petar Grašo; Ivan Vidović: "As It Was" by Harry Styles; Andrea Jelonjić: "Livin’ on a Prayer" by Bon Jovi; Mia Ribić: "Ima smisla" by Nika Turković; Toni Peruško: "Ja sam budućnost" by Majke; Hana Ivković: "Deo prošlosti" by Marija Šerifović; Eliminated: Anatalia Filimone Kević Zandamela and Lana Mandarić
11	11	"Live Shows 3"	3 December 2023
The Top 8 contestants performed one song each. Four contestants were eliminated. Performances: Dino Miklaužić: "Ti si mi u krvi" by Zdravko Čolić; Andrea Jelonjić: "Paid My Dues" by Anastacia; Vanessa Kralj: "Ne tiče me se" by Magazin; Ivan Vidović: "All I Want" by Kodaline; Mia Ribić: "Fuckin' Perfect" by Pink; Toni Peruško: "Sanjao sam noćas da te nemam" by Bijelo dugme; Petar Šegedin: "Da je meni s tobom kroz Pasike" by Vinko Coce; Hana Ivković: "Look What I Found" by Lady Gaga; Eliminated: Andrea Jelonjić, Ivan Vidović, Mia Ribić and Vanessa Kralj
12	12	"Live Shows 4"	9 December 2023
The Top 4 contestants performed two songs each in the first round of performances. Only two contestants advanced to the second round where they performed their final song. Round 1 performances: Petar Šegedin: "Pogledi u tami" by Sergej Ćetković and "Nocturno" by Oliver Dragojević; Toni Peruško: "Rebel Yell" by Billy Idol and "Mjesto za mene" by Damir Urban & 4; Hana Ivković: "When You Believe" by Whitney Houston & Mariah Carey and "Što te nema" by Jadranka Stojaković; Dino Miklaužić: "Whole Lotta Love" by Led Zeppelin and "Ostala si uvijek ista" by Mišo Kovač; Top 2: Dino Miklaužić and Hana Ivković; Round 2 performances: Dino Miklaužić: "Bed of Roses" by Bon Jovi; Hana Ivković: "I'll Never Love Again" by Lady Gaga; Winner of Superstar Season One: Hana Ivković

=== Season 2 (2024) ===
No. overall	No. in season	Title	Original release date
13	1	"Auditions 1"	28 September 2024
Advanced: Karlo Strancarić, Elizabeth Zacero, Harun Skender, Nina Andročec, Igor Liulchuck, Karla Skender, Zrinka Luketić; Did not advance: Nenad Marjanović, Klara Marković Jurić, Vivien Kurtović, Vedran Šimunec; Platinum card: Leon Grd
14	2	"Auditions 2"	5 October 2024
Advanced: Muhidin Hasanović, Gabrijela Tripić, Brina Budić, Ana Mitrović, Julijana Vincan, Nikola Batinović, Jerko Drljo, Sara Astafović, David Marušić, Katarina Car; Did not advance: Timotej Divković, Ankica Kurbaša, Andrija Šušak, Tonka, Ivan Kolić, Kristina Grbić
15	3	"Auditions 3"	12 October 2024
Advanced: Lorenza Puhar, Luka Čular, Katia Juroš, Marko Stanković, Erika Crnković, Karlo Biletić, Lara Lepan, Paula Kostelac, Efraem Norte, Ira Žurić; Did not advance: Katarina Vidović, Vice Buterin, Mia Čuk, Marko Panić, Petra Herceg Drožđek, Leonardo Nuić; Platinum card: Marko Stanković
16	4	"Auditions 4"	19 October 2024
Advanced: Lukrecija Skolan, Lara Ivić Ujević, Nina Pažanin, Silvija Totović, David Baškarad, Bojan Pavlović, Tamara Račić, Jan Samardžija, Anja Štefančić, Karlo Orbanić; Did not advance: Ivan Milutin, Toni Maleš, Karlo Čeferin, Karolina Bahtije, Barbara Lin
17	5	"Auditions 5"	26 October 2024
Advanced: Viktor Habazin, Patricija Žunić, Ema Durić, Ana Maskić, Nina Čelan, Valentina Patrun, Lukas Antinac, Katarina Skokandić, Leon Gospodarić, Karla Miletić, Šemsija Šalja; Did not advance: Anna Paula, Ivan Vusić, Ana, Valentin Antičević, Karla Miletić; Platinum card: Benjamin Hasanić
18	6	"Auditions 6"	2 November 2024
Advanced: Marina Duksita Tišljar, Anastasia Vasilieva, Antonio Baždarić, Ana Antolović, Katarina Čosić, Višnja Vukoc, Nikolina Kolarić, Dragan Stevanović, Miran Belaić, Luka Tomić, Tara Pejković, Katarina Malenica; Did not advance: Gašper Komel, Andrea Ružić, Sara Fabian, Filip Andrejević
19	7	"Auditions 7"	9 November 2024
Advanced: Anđela Tadić, Nik Marić, Marija Petrović, Sofija Stevanović, Rozi Antoš, Bojan Beara, Filip Karan, Hanan Velić, Klara Leto, Dina Leško, Nikolina Skender; Did not advance: Hrvoje Horvat, Irja Ćoralić, Maja Jelichikj, Dejan Tatić; Platinum card: Ema Bubić
20	8	"Auditions 8"	10 November 2024
Advanced: Marija Mučaj, Dino Osmanagić, Monika Jukić, Luka Tonković, Andrej Orel, Teodora Stijepović, Ivana Kopecki, Marko Martinović, Karla Miklaužić; Did not advance: Matej Mataić, Laura Božić, Adriana Profeta, Mirna Pehar
21	9	"Recall 1"	16 November 2024
22	10	"Recall 2"	17 November 2024
Out of the remaining contestats, a Top 12 was selected in the final round of the Recall stage. The selected Top 12 would go on to perform in the live shows.: Top 12: Benjamin Hasanić, Bojan Pavlović, David Baškarad, Ema Bubić, Hanan Velić, Karla Miklaužić, Katarina Car, Lorenza Puhar, Luka Tomić, Marko Stanković, Monika Jukić, Nikola Batinović
23	11	"Live Shows 1"	23 November 2024
The Top 12 contestants performed one song each. Two contestant were eliminated. Performances: Marko Stanković: "Suze nam stale na put" by Massimo Savić; Monika Jukić: "O jednoj mladosti" by Josipa Lisac; David Baškarad: "Onaj tko te ljubi sretan je" by Tony Cetinski; Luka Tomić: "Jugo" by Giuliano & Marijan Ban; Nikola Batinović: "Mojoj majci" by Hanka Paldum; Ema Bubić: "Zaljubila sam se" by Detour; Benjamin Hasanić: "Sanjam" by Indexi; Lorenza Puhar: "Man! I Feel Like a Woman!" by Shania Twain; Bojan Pavlović: "Con te partiro" by Andrea Bocelli; Hanan Velić: "Replay" by Senidah; Karla Miklaužić: "Fallin'" by Alicia Keys; Katarina Car: "Holding Out for a Hero" by Bonnie Tyler; Eliminated: Lorenza Puhar and David Baškarad
24	12	"Live Shows 2"	30 November 2024
The Top 10 contestants performed one song each. Two contestant were eliminated. Performances: Luka Tomić: "Marija Magdalena" by Doris Dragović; Ema Bubić: "Birds of a Feather" by Billie Eilish; Bojan Pavlović: "Svirajte noćas samo za nju" by Toma Zdravković; Monika Jukić: "Vogue" by Madonna; Benjamin Hasanić: "Nema suza" by Dženan Lončarević; Marko Stanković: "You Shook Me All Night Long" by AC/DC; Karla Miklaužić: "Moja posljednja i prva ljubavi" by Tereza Kesovija; Hanan Velić: "Clocks" by Coldplay; Nikola Batinović: "Skin" by Rag'n'Bone Man; Katarina Car: "The Pretender" by Foo Fighters; Eliminated: Luka Tomić and Bojan Pavlović
25	13	"Live Shows 3"	7 December 2024
The Top 8 contestants performed one song each. Four contestants were eliminated Performances: Nikola Batinović: "Bože brani je od zla" by Toše Proeski; Karla Miklaužić: "Something's Got a Hold on Me" by Etta James; Monika Jukić: "Nisi više moja bol" by Gibonni; Hanan Velić: "Elastic Heart" by Sia; Marko Stanković: "Kao moja mati" by Zdravko Čolić; Ema Bubić: "Dancing on My Own" by Calum Scott; Katarina Car: "Frka" by Nipplepeople; Benjamin Hasanić: "Canzone per te" by Sergio Endrigo; Eliminated: Nikola Batinović, Monika Jukić, Hanan Velić and Katarina Car
26	14	"Live Shows 4"	14 December 2024
The Top 4 contestants performed two song each. Performances: Karla Miklaužić: It's All Coming Back to Me Now by Celine Dion & Suza za zagorske brege by Vice Vukov; Marko Stanković: Činim pravu stvar by Gibonni & Let Me Entertain You by Robbie Williams; Ema Bubić: Body by Jordan Suaste & Tango by Vatra; Benjamin Hasanić: Mi by Dino Merlin & Studen vodo by Armin Muzaferija; Winner of Superstar Season Two: Karla Miklaužić
