= Metropolis (Anatolia) =

Classical city in western Turkey

- Μητρόπολις (Ancient Greek)
- Bademgediği Tepe
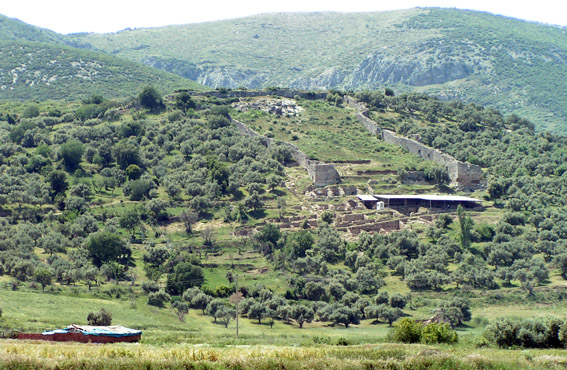
- The city's ruins as seen from the east.

- Location within Turkey
- 38°07′30″N 27°19′21″E
- Type: Settlement
- Location: Yeniköy, İzmir Province, Turkey
- Region: Ionia

Metropolis (Ancient Greek: Μητρόπολις) is a classical city situated in western Turkey near Yeniköy village in Torbali municipality - approximately 40 km SE of İzmir. Occupation at the site Bademgediği Tepe goes back to the Neolithic period. In the Late Bronze Age, the city was known under the Hittites as Puranda. Classical, Hellenistic, Roman, Byzantine, and Ottoman periods are well represented at the site.

It is often referred to as the "City of the Mother Goddess".

== History ==
The earliest known settlement at the site is from the Neolithic showing evidence of contact and influence with the Troy I littoral culture.

=== Late Bronze Age ===
The city seems to be referred to as Puranda in the Annals of Mursilis II which described his invasion of Arzawa in the late 14th century BC. According to the Annals, after Mursili conquered the capital of Arzawa, Apasas (later Ephesus) which was located some 30 km to the southwest, Hursanassan, Surudan, and Attarimman refugees fled to Puranda. The prince of Arzawa, Tapalazunauli, who had fled to the islands during the invasion, entered Puranda to lead the resistance, but Mursili took Puranda and Tapalazunauli fled with his family.

Mycenaean remains are also found. Bademgedigi Tepe is the archaeological site in the area with large amounts of local Mycenaean pottery, ranging from the 14th to 12th century BC, and later. A Mycenaean-age representation of a ship on a vase from Bademgediği Tepe is an important find that casts light on the development of ship technology and iconography on ceramic vessels.

=== Classical Age ===
==== Hellenistic Period ====
Metropolis was a part of the Hellenistic kingdom of Pergamum and during this period the city reached a zenith of cultural and economic life. A temple dedicated to the war god Ares, one of only two known such temples, has been located at this site.

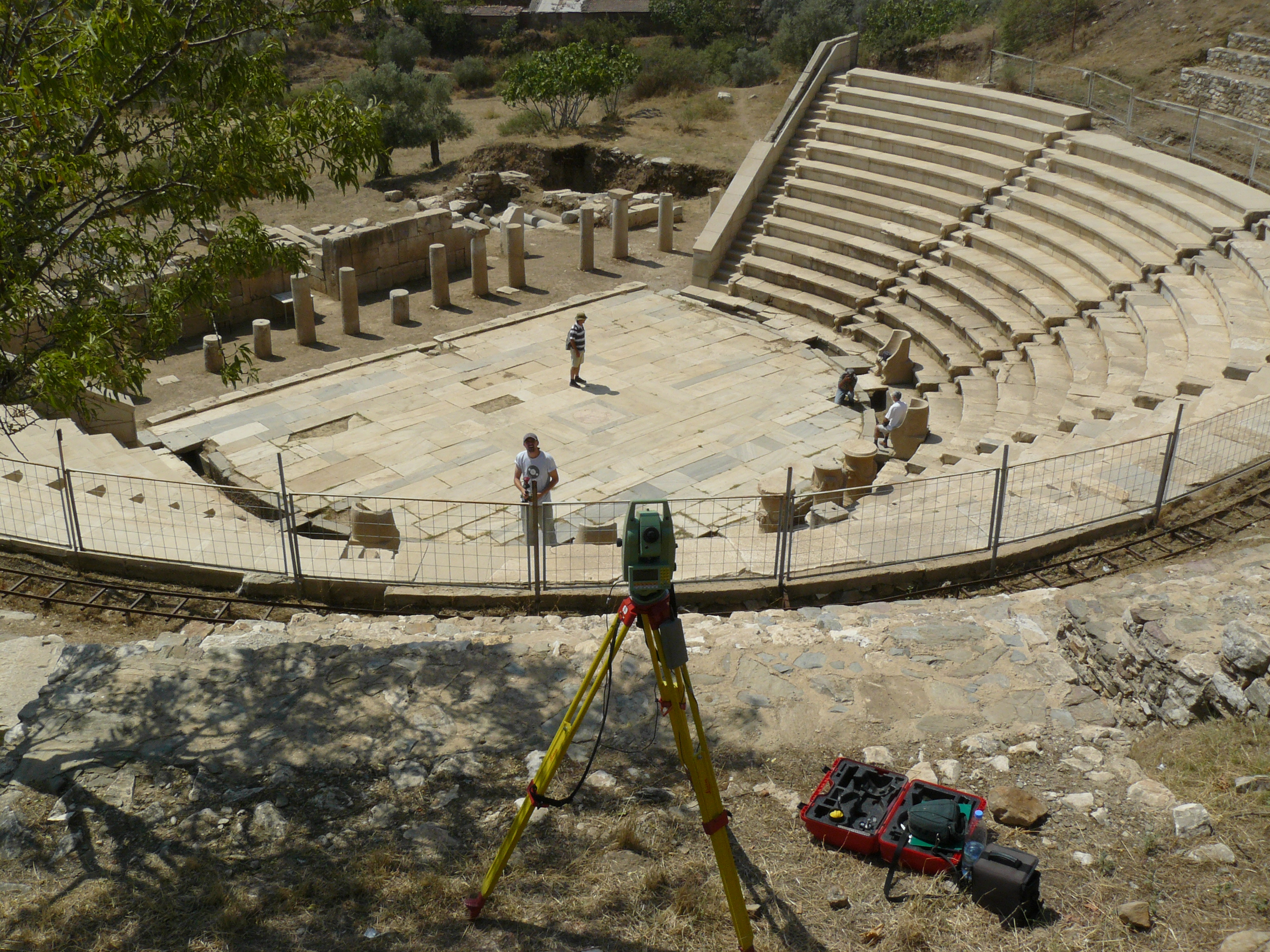
The theatre at Metropolis, restored in 2001, photograph taken 2007

The city was noted by numerous classical authors including Strabo and Ptolemy, and described as a town in the Caystrian plain in Lydia, on the road from Smyrna to Ephesus, at a distance of 120 stadia from Ephesus, and 180 from Smyrna. Strabo relates that the district of Metropolis produced excellent wine. The town was still noted by Byzantine authors such as Stephanus of Byzantium and Hierocles.

What is visible today is primarily a Hellenistic city heavily Romanised, and with Byzantine remains laid across it – a church to the east of the city, and fortification walls laid across the city that connect to the Hellenistic defenses on the Acropolis.

== Excavations ==
The city was first investigated through archaeological field work from 1972 by Professor Recep Meriç from the Dokuz Eylül University, İzmir. Metropolis has been excavated since 1989.

In 1995, archaeologists discovered a Hellenistic marble seat of honor with griffins in the Ancient Theatre. The original seat of honor is displayed at the İzmir Archeological Museum and a replica has been placed at the theatre.

In June 2021, archaeologists announced the discovery of a well-preserved 1,800-year-old marble statue of a woman standing on a pedestal in Torbalı district. The head and two arms of the statue were missing.

In 2025, archaeologists unearthed an agora on the southern slopes of the city. They believe it remained in use until the 5th or 6th century AD, but likely lost its function due to an earthquake.

== Bibliography ==
Books

- Aybek, S., Metropolis İonia I: Heykel, Metropolis'de Hellenistik ve Roma Dönemi Heykeltıraşlığı, İstanbul, 2009.
- Aybek, S., Ekin Meriç, A., Öz, A. K., Metropolis: A Mother Goddess City in Ionia, İstanbul, 2009.
- Aybek, S., Ekin Meriç, A., Öz, A. K., Metropolis: İonia'da Bir Ana Tanrıça Kenti, İstanbul, 2009.
- Meriç, R., Metropolis, City of the Mother Goddess, İstanbul, 2003.
- Meriç, R., Metropolis, Ana Tanrıça Kenti, İstanbul, 2003.
- Meriç, R., Späthellenistisch-römische Keramik und Kleinfunde aus einem Scachtbrunnen am Staatsmarkt in Ephesos, Wien, 2002.
- Meriç, R., Metropolis Kazılarının İlk 5 Yılı, İstanbul, 1996.
- Meriç, R., Metropolis, İstanbul, 1992.
- Meriç, R., Metropolis in Ionien: Ergebnisse einer Survey-Unternehmung in den Jahren 1972–1975, Königstein, 1982.

Articles

- Herling, L., Kasper, K., Lichter, C., Meriç, R., Im Westen nichts Neues? Ergebnisse der Grabungen 2003–2004 in Dedecik-Heybelitepe, Istanbuler Mitteilungen, 58, s. 13-65, 2008.
- Meriç, R., “Metropolis”, W. Radt ed. içinde, Byzas 3; Stadtgrabungen und Stadtforschung im westlichen Kleinasien, 2006, s. 227-240.
- Meriç, R., “Excavation at Bademgeiği Tepe (Puranda) 1999–2002: A Preliminary Report, Istanbuler Mitteilungen, 2003, s. 79-98.
- Meriç, R., Mountjoy, P., “Three Mycenaean Vases from Ionia”, Istanbuler Mitteilungen, 51, 2001, s. 133-137.
- Meriç, R., Mountjoy, P. (2002), “Mycenaean Pottery from Bademgedigi Tepe (Puranda) in Ionia: A Preliminary Report.” Istanbul Mitteilungen 52:79–98
- Meriç, R., Schachner, A., “Ein Stempelsiegel des spaeten 2. Jahrtausends v. Chr. aus Metropolis in Ionien”, Studi Micenei ed Egeo-Anatolici, XLII/1-2000, s. 85-102.
