= Farmer Wants a Wife =

Television series

- Logo used for Channel 5 version
- Genre: Dating game show
- Presented by: Catherine Gee (2001); Louise Redknapp (2009); Lisa Hogan (2026)
- Country of origin: United Kingdom
- Original language: English
- No. of series: 2
- No. of episodes: 13

Production
- Executive producer: John Longley
- Production companies: Thames Television (2001); FremantleMedia (2009); Naked (2026)

Original release
- Network: ITV
- Release: 8 November – 20 December 2001
- Network: Channel 5
- Release: 16 September – 21 October 2009
- Network: ITV
- Release: 2026

Farmer Wants a Wife is a reality television series developed by Fremantle Media. The basic structure of the programme is that a number of farmers are presented with women from the city, from whom they choose one to be their spouse. The first edition premièred in the United Kingdom on ITV in 2001. However, the original format of the programme is likely to date back to the TV programme Bauer sucht Bäuerin, which was broadcast in 1983 on SF DRS in Switzerland.

Some versions have also occasionally included gay or women farmers who were seeking husbands.

== History ==
After its UK debut in 2001, the show had more than 10 localised versions around the world, with mixed ratings reports. It was the No. 1 television show for stations that aired it in Belgium and Norway, and was the highest rated (up to 60%) entertainment show in the Netherlands.

Premiered in spring 2008, the American version of Farmer Wants a Wife consists of 8 episodes, during which 10 women are trying to be chosen by just one bachelor farmer. In this the American version differed from the other international versions, and it was more fictionalised. This version got cancelled by The CW after one season. In March 2023, a new version aired on Fox and is now in its third season.

In September 2009, Farmer Wants a Wife returned to British television for a series on Channel 5, presented by singer and television personality Louise Redknapp. In January 2026, it was announced that the format would return once again but this time under the name Farming for Love and would be broadcast on ITV. In April 2026, Lisa Hogan, the partner of Jeremy Clarkson was announced as the new presenter of the reboot.

== Transmissions ==
Series	Start date	End date	Episodes
1	8 November 2001	20 December 2001	7
2	16 September 2009	21 October 2009	6

== International versions ==
Country	Name	Channel	Host	Premiere	Ending	Website
Australia	The Farmer Wants a Wife	Nine Network	Natalie Gruzlewski	24 October 2007	26 September 2012	Link
Australia	The Farmer Wants a Wife	Nine Network	Natalie Gruzlewski; Sam McClymont	1 February 2016	14 March 2016	Link
Australia	The Farmer Wants a Wife	Seven Network	Natalie Gruzlewski (2020–2022, 2025–present); Sam Armytage (2023–2024)	26 July 2020	Present	Link
Austria	Bauer sucht Frau	ATV	Katrin Lampe (2005–2013); Arabella Kiesbauer (2014–present)	2005	Present	Link
Belgium (Flanders)	Boer zoekt Vrouw	VTM	Dina Tersago An Lemmens (2018–2020)	March 2004	Present	Link
Belgium (Wallonia)	L'amour est dans le pré	RTL-TVI	Julie Taton (2009–2011)Sandrine Dans (2012–2023) Maria Del Rio (2024–present)	2008	Present	Link
Bulgaria	Фермер търси жена Fermer tyrsi jena	Nova Television	Aleks Surchajieva	29 September 2011	8 December 2011	
Bulgaria	Фермер търси жена Fermer tyrsi jena	Nova Television	Didi Todorova	18 September 2015	11 December 2015	
Canada	L'amour est dans le pré	V/Noovo	Marie-Ève Janvier; Katherine Levac; Marie-Soleil Dion	29 January 2011	Present	Link
Canada	Farming for Love	CTV	Sabrina Jalees	28 May 2023	31 July 2024	Link
Croatia	Ljubav je na selu	RTL	Lorena Nosić (2008–2010); Marijana Batinić (2012–2020); Anita Martinović (2021–present)	4 September 2008	Present	Link
Czech Republic	Farmář hledá ženu	TV Prima	Laďka Něrgešová	14 July 2010	2017	Link
Czech Republic	Farmář hledá ženu	TV Prima	Laďka Něrgešová	3 April 2022	Present	
Czech Republic	Farmář hledá ženu	TV Barrandov	Alice Bendová	3 March 2017	2021	Link
Denmark	Bonde søger brud	Kanal 4	Anne-Dorte	2006	2008	
Denmark	Landmand søger kærlighed	TV 2	Lene Beier (2015–2024)Sofie Martinusen (2025–present)	2015	Present	
Estonia	Maamees otsib naist	Kanal 2	Krista Lensin	May 2007	2007	Link
Finland	Maajussille morsian	MTV3	Mia Halonen (2006)Miia Nuutila (2007–2016) Vappu Pimiä (2017–present)	26 March 2006	Present	Link
France	L'amour est dans le pré	M6	Véronique Mounier (2005–2006, 2008); Alessandra Sublet (2006–2007, 2009); Karine Le Marchand (2010–present)	8 September 2005	Present	Link
Germany	Bauer sucht Frau	RTL	Inka Bause	2 October 2005	Present	Link
Germany	Land und Liebe	NDR Fernsehen	Ina Müller (2005–2007)Yared Dibaba (2009–2010)	20 July 2005	2010	Link
Greece	Αγρότης μόνος ψάχνει Agrótis mónos psáchnei	Alpha TV	Sissy Christidou	1 July 2009	15 December 2010	Link
Hungary	Házasodna a gazda	RTL	Ildikó Kovalcsik "Lilu"	29 June 2012	19 December 2012	Link
Hungary	Házasodna a gazda	RTL	Anikó Nádai	1 September 2019	Present	Link
Ireland	Love in the Country	RTÉ2	Anna Geary	6 November 2023	Present	
Italy	Il contadino cerca moglie	Fox Life, TV8, Sky Uno (2015–2018); Nove (2021–present)	Simona Ventura (2015); Ilenia Lazzarin (2016–2017); Diletta Leotta (2018); Gabriele Corsi (2021–2024)	6 October 2015	12 December 2024	
Latvia	Saimnieks meklē sievu	TV3	Baiba Sipeniece	2009		Link
Lithuania	Ūkininkas ieško žmonos	TV3	Nijolė Pareigytė	26 April 2011		Link
Netherlands	Boer zoekt Vrouw	NPO 1	Yvon Jaspers	21 November 2004	Present	Link
Norway	Jakten på kjærligheten	TV2	Marthe Sveberg	24 August 2004	Present	Link
Poland	Rolnik szuka żony	TVP1	Marta Manowska	21 May 2014	Present	Link
Portugal	Quem quer namorar com o agricultor?	SIC	Andreia Rodrigues	10 March 2019	18 February 2023	
Romania	Fermier. Caut nevastă!	Prima TV	Luana Ibacka	12 March 2009	2009	
Romania	Gospodar fără pereche	Pro TV	Anamaria Prodan	11 September 2017	2020	
Serbia	Domaćine, oženi se	Prva	Tijana Čurović	15 October 2010	2014	
Slovenia	Ljubezen na seniku	TV3	Saša Lendero	Spring 2011	2011	
Slovenia	Ljubezen na deželi	Planet TV	Saša Lendero	Autumn 2013	2013	
Slovenia	Ljubezen po domače	POP TV	Tanja Postružnik	Autumn 2016		Link
Slovakia	Farmár hľadá ženu	TV JOJ	Aneta Parišková	2010	2017	Link
South Africa	Boer soek 'n Vrou	KykNET	Minki van der Westhuizen, Elma Postma, Marciel Hopkins	30 September 2008	Present	Link
Spain	Granjero busca esposa	Cuatro	Luján Argüelles	12 January 2009	16 November 2011	Link
Spain	Granjero busca esposa	Cuatro	Carlos Lozano	12 September 2016	10 January 2018	Link
Sweden	Bonde söker fru	TV4	Linda Lindorff	28 May 2006	Present	Link
Switzerland	Bauer, ledig, sucht...	3+	Marco Fritsche	2008	2008	Link
Ukraine	Фермер шукає дружину Fermer shukaye druzhynu	STB	Irina Borisyuk	30 September 2011	2011	Link
United States	Farmer Wants a Wife	The CW	Matt Neustadt	30 April 2008	25 June 2008	Link
United States	Farmer Wants a Wife	Fox	Jennifer Nettles (2023–2024); Kimberly Williams-Paisley (2025–present)	8 March 2023	Present	Link
