= Hell's Kitchen Hrvatska =

- Genre: Reality competition
- Based on: Hell's Kitchen by Gordon Ramsay
- Presented by: Tomislav Gretić
- Country of origin: Croatia
- Original language: Croatian
- No. of seasons: 1
- No. of episodes: 59

Production
- Executive producer: Elma Fetahović Zubčić
- Producer: Marijana Jurišić
- Camera setup: Multi-camera
- Running time: 60 minutes

Original release
- Network: RTL
- Release: 31 January – 15 June 2024

Hell's Kitchen Hrvatska is a Croatian reality competition television series based on Hell's Kitchen. Hosted by Tomislav Gretić, the series looks for the best chef.

The series ran for one season from 31 January to 15 June 2024 on RTL. It was won by Viktor Vercoustre.

== Production ==
RTL announced the series in September 2023 when the auditions were open for aspiring contestants. The series premiere on 31 January 2024 on RTL and aired from Wednesdays to Fridays. Ivana Bekavac and Ivan Vrbanec appeared as sous-chefs, with Tomislav Gretić as the host.

Divided into red and blue teams, the contestants were tasked with preparing meals, which were rated by Gretić. The season was won by Viktor Vercoustre.

== Contestants ==
Eighteen contestants originally entered the competition. Additional four contestants, Nikola, Milena, Anel and Viktor, were introduced mid-season.

Hell's Kitchen Hrvatska contestants
Name	Age	Hometown	Result
Viktor Vercoustre	36	Zagreb	Winner
Vehid Šaldić	24	Gradačac	Runner-up
Lucija Turčinov	30	Murter	Eliminated; Episode 58
Mauro Renje	28	Šibenik	Eliminated; Episode 58
Anel Tomašić	27	Podturen	Eliminated; Episode 57
Domagoj Čirjak	28	Zadar	Eliminated; Episode 54
Chiara Ožaković	24	Zadar	Eliminated; Episode 51
Milena Krizmanić	32	Metković	Eliminated; Episode 48
Nikola Mrvac	27	Gornja Lomnica	Eliminated; Episode 45
Dominik Kovačićek	22	Zagreb	Eliminated; Episode42
Roko Kunčić	20	Kaštel Novi	Eliminated; Episode 39
Roko Ćibarić	23	Zagreb	Eliminated; Episode 36
Marko Leutar	28	Županja	Eliminated; Episode 33
Marjana Tikel	37	Motovun	Eliminated; Episode 30
Tomislav Subašić	46	Vinkovci	Eliminated; Episode 27
Sara Marčina	23	Zadar	Eliminated; Episode 24
Tea Pilat	30	Daruvar	Eliminated; Episode 18
Josip Šantek	32	Bibinje	Eliminated; Episode 15
Emina Huseljić	30	Visoko, BIH	Eliminated; Episode 9
Damir Glasnović	28	Mali Lošinj	Disqualified; Episode 8/9
Dean Vučin	33	Velika Gorica	Eliminated; Episode 6
Dragomir Matijević	38	Petrinja	Eliminated; Episode 3
