= 2020 in archaeology =

This page lists major events of 2020 in archaeology.

== Excavations ==
- January–August – Site of a sacristy at Westminster Abbey in London, a 13th-century monastic burial site, excavated; remains of hundreds of bodies located.
- January 29 – NZR V class steam locomotive no. 127 (1885) is recovered from the Ōreti River in New Zealand by the Lumsden Heritage Trust.
- February – Mexico and Spain plan to search for the remains of Nuestra Señora de Juncal ("Our Lady of Juncal") ship, which sank off the coast of Mexico in 1631.
- March – Excavations at Richborough Castle in England start to uncover the Roman amphitheatre hidden under a mound here.
- May – Excavations in a hillfort at Tap o' Noth near Rhynie, Aberdeenshire in Scotland identify it as one of the largest ancient settlements ever discovered in the country.
- June 27 – Excavation of a Viking ship burial at Gjellestad near Halden in Norway located in 2018 begins.
- July:
  - Divers find an 11,000-year-old mining site for red ocher pigments at La Mina, a site inside a water-filled cave beneath Yucatán Peninsula, Quintana Roo, Mexico.
  - A shipwreck which was found near Ma'agan Michael carrying amphorae with Christian and Muslim symbols, and dated back to the 7th century, has been excavated by the University of Haifa since 2016.
  - Start of excavations at Cerne Abbas Giant hill figure in England, which will indicate a date range for construction of 700-1100CE — the late Anglo-Saxon period, and much later than expected.
- September:
  - Wreckage discovered in 2017 off the Mexican coast is identified as a 19th-century Mayan slave ship, La Unión.
  - Excavations near Luxor, Egypt, begin, resulting in discovery of a 3,000-year-old lost city which is named Aten.
- October – Archaeological work on the Nazca Lines in Peru has revealed the outline of a cat.
- December – An international team of archaeologists discovers 66 Roman military sites in León, Palencia, Burgos and Cantabria provinces of Spain.
- Undated
  - Investigation of Roman roads now submerged in the Venetian Lagoon.
  - Mayfield Baths, a 19th century washhouse in Manchester (England), are found and excavated.

== Finds ==
- January
  - 23 – A cave with paintings of people and animals is discovered about 30 kilometres (19 mi) north of Mount Catherine, Sinai Peninsula, dating back to the Chalcolithic Period, c. 5th–4th millennium BCE.
  - 30 – 16 tombs with about 20 sarcophagi are found at Al-Ghoreifa area in Tuna el-Gebel, Egypt, dating back to the 26th Dynasty.
  - A British Short Stirling bomber aircraft (lost 1943) is located in the Markermeer in the Netherlands.
  - Winterburg tunnel, in which several hundred German soldiers were entombed by an explosion in 1917, is located in France by Pierre Malinowski.
- February
  - 12 – 83 ancient tombs are found in Om al-Khilgan, Dakahlia Governorate, dated back to 4,000 B.C.
  - 17 – Carvings depicting animals are found at Cave Font Major, Catalonia, dated back to 15,000 years ago.
  - 21
    - A sarcophagus is discovered in an ancient temple in the Roman Forum, which might belong to Rome's legendary founder, Romulus.
    - A lost city is found at Türkmen-Karahöyük, Konya Plain, which might be related to Tarḫuntašša, and its king Hartapu.
- March
  - 10 – Ancient capital of the Mayan Kingdom of Sak Tz'i is found at Lacanjá Tzeltal, Chiapas, Mexico.
  - 11 – Discovery of site of railway roundhouse at Birmingham Curzon Street railway station (1838–1966) in England during construction work for High Speed 2 is announced.
  - 13
    - A mantis petroglyph is discovered in the Teymareh rock art site, Khomeyn, Iran, dates back in the range of 40,000–4,000 years ago.
    - A ballcourt is discovered at Etlatongo, Mexico, dating to 1374 BCE.
  - 16 – Two small stone 'plaquettes' are found in the Leang Bulu Bettue cave, Sulawesi, Indonesia, date to a time between 26,000 and 14,000 years ago.
  - 17 – A bone circle of at least 60 mammoths is discovered at Kostenki, Russia, dating back to 25,000 years ago.
  - 31
    - A 5,000-year-old cultic area dedicated to Ningirsu is discovered in Girsu, Iraq.
    - Ancient cairns used to bury neolithic tribespeople are discovered in the Cwmcelyn valley in Blaenau Gwent, Wales, dating back over 4,500 years ago.
- April
  - 26 – Rock art depicting scenes of animals is discovered in the area of Wadi Al-Zulma in North Sinai, Egypt.
- May
  - 11 – Discovery of wreck of USS Nevada (BB-36) off Pearl Harbor is announced.
  - 17 – A tomb at Oxyrhynchus, dating back to the 26th Dynasty of Egypt, along with stelae and bronze coins from the Roman era, is discovered.
  - 20
    - Discovery of underground rooms below the 1,400-year-old mosaic floor of Byzantine structure in the Old City of Jerusalem is announced by Israel Antiquities Authority.
    - The skeleton of a 300.000-year-old female straight-tusked elephant with a weight of 6.8 tonnes in Lower Saxony, Germany, is revealed.
  - 25 – The discovery of 3,000 years old cave paintings in Kui Buri District, Prachuap Khiri Khan Province, Thailand is announced.
  - 26 – Remains of a 200-year-old English sailing ship are discovered in a coral reef off the coast of Quintana Roo in Mexico.
  - 27 – Discovery of a well-preserved Roman mosaic floor in a vineyard at Negrar in the Veneto of Italy is announced.
  - 29 – Remains of at least sixty mammoths are found at an airport construction site in Mexico.
- June
  - The 'Peebles Hoard', comprising Bronze Age horse harness, a sword in its scabbard and other artefacts including a "rattle pendant", is discovered near Peebles in the Scottish Borders by a metal detectorist.
  - 3 – A 3,000-year-old Maya ceremonial platform, Aguada Fénix, about 1,400 m long, 400 m wide and 10–15 m tall has been discovered near the San Pedro River in Tabasco, Mexico. It is described as the oldest and the largest Mayan ceremonial site known.
  - 9 – A 6th millennium BC megalithic monument is discovered in Dumat al-Jandal, Saudi Arabia.
  - 21 – Discovery of high-status mummy burials at Taposiris Magna in Egypt is publicised.
  - 22 – Discovery of Durrington Shafts, a series of 10 m-deep neolithic pits in a 2 km (1.2 mi.)-diameter circle surrounding Durrington Walls within the Stonehenge World Heritage Site in England, is announced.
- July
  - 11 – Discovery of an Iron Age skeleton, apparently a victim of foul play, near Wendover in England on the route of High Speed 2 is announced.
  - 13 – Remains of the palace of Axayacatl and a house belonging to Hernán Cortés are found by Raúl Barrera Rodríguez and José María García Guerrero of the Instituto Nacional de Antropología e Historia (INAH) in Mexico City.
  - 21 – Prehispanic remains are found at the Cerro de Peña in Santa Cruz Huehuepiaxtla, Puebla, Mexico.
  - 22 – Stone tools found in Zacatecas, Mexico, suggest that people lived in North America 26,500 years ago.
  - 23
    - Archaeologists in Jerusalem discover a 3,000-year-old warehouse.
    - Discovery of the wreck of Great Lakes train ferry SS Pere Marquette 18 (sank 1910) in Lake Michigan.
  - 24 – Russian scientists are working to retrieve the well-preserved skeleton of a woolly mammoth from Pechevalavato Lake in the Yamalo-Nenets Autonomous Okrug in northern Siberia.
  - 27 – A 3rd-century woman statue is discovered in Perge, Anatolia.
  - 28 – Statues of Sekhmet, Ptah and Hathor are found in Mit Rahina, Egypt, dating back to the reign of Ramses II.
  - 29 – A 1st-century Roman fort is uncovered at Burscough, England.
  - 30 – A 1,500-year-old Byzantine church is unearthed in Kfar Kama, Israel.
- August
  - Bones of a high-status 6th century male, the "Marlow Warlord", are found at a site overlooking the River Thames in Berkshire, England.
  - 4 – A prehistoric "Woodhenge" has been discovered at Perdigões, Évora District, Portugal.
  - 5 – 8,000-year-old fluted arrowheads have been found at sites in Oman and Yemen.
  - 17 – Discovery of fragments of Elizabethan and earlier books, manuscripts and textiles beneath attic floorboards of Oxburgh Hall in eastern England is reported.
  - 24 – Discovery of 425 gold coins of the Abbasid Caliphate at Yavne in Israel is announced.
  - 26– Archaeologists revealed a 5,000-year-old paint palette made of stone in the Seyitgazi district at the Küllüoba site. According to Türktaki, this palette was used for painting dishes.
  - 29 – 8,600-year-old Neolithic sewing tools are discovered at Ekşi Höyük, western Anatolia, in present-day Denizli Province.
- September
  - 1,300 Celtic golden coins are discovered at a location in eastern England, dated back between 40 and 50 A.D.
  - 6 – A 2,400-year-old mask of the ancient Greek god Dionysus has been unearthed in Daskyleion, Anatolia.
  - 7 - A Roman villa from Julius Caesar's age has been discovered in Pianura suburb, Naples.
  - 8 – An ancient lion statue has been found in Phnom Penh, Cambodia.
  - 9
    - An ancient stone pool, dating back to the fourth century BC, has been discovered between Rome and Ostia Antica in Italy.
    - Dog remains found in two caves, Paglicci Cave and Grotta Romanelli, in Apulia, Italy, are dated to between 20,000 and 14,000 years ago.
  - 11 – A 2,000-year-old Romano-British roundhouse measuring some 40 feet in diameter has been discovered at Bamburgh Castle, Northumberland.
  - 15 – Discovery of the well-preserved carcass of a brown bear dating from the Last Glacial Period in melting permafrost on the Lyakhovsky Islands in Arctic Russia is reported.
  - 16 – 4,300-year-old figurines depicting gods have been discovered at Kültepe, Anatolia.
  - 17 – An Anglo-Saxon cemetery with 200 graves has been unearthed in Oulton Broad, Suffolk, dating back to the 7th century.
  - 18 - The Teanum Apulum Roman amphitheatre has been discovered in San Paolo di Civitate.
  - 20 – Discovery during the month of 27 sealed wooden sarcophagi buried more than 2,500 years BCE inside a newly-located well at the sacred necropolis of Saqqara in Egypt is announced.
  - 22 – Mosaics of a 1600-year-old church have been discovered in Göktaş, Mardin Province, Anatolia.
  - 26 – Discovery of the oldest and most complete known set of Roman body armor at the site of the Battle of the Teutoburg Forest in Germany is announced.
  - 28 – A place of worship unearthed at Kahin Tepe, Kastamonu Province, Anatolia, dates back to between 12,000 and 7,000 BC.
- October
  - Rock art depicting animals is discovered inside Dunchraigaig Cairn in Kilmartin Glen in Scotland, estimated to date to between 4,000 and 5,000 BP, the earliest found in the country.
  - 3 – Egypt unveils 59 coffins of priests and clerks in Saqqara from the 26th dynasty nearly 2,500 years ago.
  - 12
    - The sarcophagus of Djehuty Imhotep, a 26th Dynasty high priest, has been discovered in Al-Ghoreifa archaeological site in Minya, Egypt.
    - An engraved tablet with Hellenistic script found in Simele district, Duhok Governorate, Iraq, probably referring to Demetrius I Soter is dated back to 165 B.C.
  - 13 – Discovery of the footprint tracks of an adult and child from more than 10,000 years BP in White Sands National Park, New Mexico, is announced.
  - 20 – More than 80 coffins are reported unearthed in Saqqara, in addition to gilded and wooden statues.
- November
  - A German Enigma machine is found by divers in Gelting Bay of the Baltic Sea.
  - 21 – Impressions of the bodies of a rich man and a slave killed by the eruption of Mount Vesuvius in 79 AD found at Pompeii earlier in the month are made public.
- December
  - 2 - During renovation works for a grid, a Roman villa and four graves are found on the Venafro plain of Italy.
  - 10 – Excavations at Chedworth Roman Villa in the Cotswolds of England have revealed a mosaic floor probably laid in the mid-5th century, after the end of Roman rule in Britain, it is reported.
  - 19 – Refurbishment of a suburban shop at Chipping Barnet in north London has revealed 14th-century timber framing.
  - 21 – Remains of a 1,500 year-old Byzantine church (known as the Church of All Nations) with Greek inscriptions and the foundations of a Second Temple-era ritual bath (also known as a mikveh) are discovered in Gethsemane.
  - 22 – Mosaic panels are discovered in Baalbek, Lebanon, dated back to the Roman era.
  - 27 – Archaeologists from the University of Haifa announced the discovery of the oldest known tool used for grinding or scraping, dating back about 350,000 years at the Tabun Cave at Mount Carmel site.
  - 29 – A 1,840-year-old vessel is discovered near the Baicaopo Village, Yibin District in the city of Luoyang, China, which helps to confirm the tomb location of Emperor Huan of Han.
  - 30 – Four cisterns are discovered under a seven-meter earth fill in Metropolis, Anatolia, which have the capacity to carry 600 tons of water and to endure a long siege.
- Undated
  - During a 3rd excavation campaign at the site of Tal Ganoub Qasr al-Agouz in the Bahariya Oasis of Egypt, a Christian monastic site active in the 5th century AD is discovered by a French-Norwegian team.
  - A high-status Roman villa site containing substantial portions of a mosaic depicting scenes from the Trojan War is found by chance on a farm in Rutland, England.

== Events ==
- January 9 – A gold bar found in Mexico City in 1981 is confirmed as made of material appropriated during the Spanish conquest of the Aztec Empire and presumably abandoned by the Spanish at the time of La Noche Triste in 1520.
- February – Start of community archaeology project in the New Forest of southern England to identify historic graffiti incised on trees.
- February 22 – 3,900 pre-Columbian copper coins from Guerrero and Michoacán will be returned to Mexico from the United States.
- March 6 – Bones first located in 1885 in the wall of St Mary and St Eanswythe's Church, Folkestone in England are announced as identified as almost certainly those of Anglo Saxon princess Eanswith (died c.640), the earliest identified burial of an English saint.
- May – Staff at Vindolanda Museum by Hadrian's Wall in England sorting material held since 1993 during the shutdown imposed by the COVID-19 pandemic in the United Kingdom find a leather toy mouse from the auxiliary fort.
- May 23 – Juukan Gorge and another Australian Aboriginal sacred site are blasted by mining company Rio Tinto.
- July – Gold hunters who have used heavy machinery to excavate the two millennia-old Jabal Maragha archaeological site in the Bayuda Desert, Sudan, destroying it, having been arrested and had their equipment seized, are released without charges.
- July 8 – The Portable Antiquities Scheme in England and Wales records the 1.5 millionth small artefact found by a member of the public, a lead bulla of Pope Innocent IV from Shropshire.
- July 29 – Identification of the likely source of the sarsen stones at Stonehenge in England at a location 24 km (15 mi) to the north is reported.
- August 4 – Identification of man-made Viking inland navigation channels on Mainland, Orkney (Scotland) is reported.
- September 1 – Analysis shows that in Britain about 4,500BP, ancestral bones were retained as ornaments.
- December 16 – Announcement that fragments of cedarwood recovered from the Great Pyramid of Giza in 1872 and donated to the University of Aberdeen's museum in 1946 have been rediscovered and carbon-dated to 3341-3094 BCE.

== Deaths ==
- February 6 – Wang Jin, 93, Chinese prehistoric archaeologist (b. 1926)
- March 14 – Ofer Bar-Yosef, 82, Israeli Palaeolithic archaeologist (b. 1937)
- March 16 – Pilar Luna, 75, Mexican underwater archaeologist (b. 1944)
- April 8 – Aubrey Burl, 93, British prehistoric archaeologist (b. 1926)
- June 13 – Pepe el Ferreiro, 78, Spanish archaeologist (b. 1942)
- July 2 – Ángela Jeria, 93, Chilean archaeologist and human rights activist (b. 1926)
- August 2 – Gregory Areshian, 71, Armenian-American archaeologist and historian (b. 1949)
- September 15 – Mario Torelli, 83, Italian archaeologist (b. 1937)
- October 14 – John M. Coles, 90, English prehistorian (b. 1930)
- December 30 – Otto Schöndube, 84, Mexican archaeologist from Jalisco.

== See also ==
- List of years in archaeology
