= Blago nama =

- Genre: Comedy
- Written by: Mirna Miličić; Vlado Bulić
- Country of origin: Croatia
- Original language: Croatian
- No. of seasons: 2
- No. of episodes: 129

Production
- Running time: 30–35 minutes

Original release
- Network: RTL
- Release: 9 November 2020 – 18 March 2022

Blago nama is a Croatian comedy television series created by Goran Rukavina. It was broadcast on RTL for two seasons between 9 November 2020 and 18 March 2022.

== Premise ==
The family Pavić, which consists of Ana Pavić, her husband Boris, and their infant son Ivan, are the focus of the series. To begin a new life "according to European standards," the couple arranges a vacation to Brussels. As Ana's sister Tamara, her family, and their shared father Drago move into their home, their plan quickly falls apart. Two families with completely opposite views of the world will have to overcome their differences and learn to live in harmony together. When Martin Prosinečki, the eccentric neighbor, and his fiancée Ivanka move into the neighborhood, Drago and Martin become good friends, which further complicates the situation.

== Cast ==
=== Main cast ===
- Tara Rosandić as Ana Špehar Pavić
- Filip Križan as Boris Pavić
- Enis Bešlagić as Jadranko Juhić
- Hristina Popović as Tamara Špehar Juhić
- Žarko Radić as Drago Špehar
- Nino Lehki as Lukas Juhić
- Petar Jurić as Ivano Pavić

=== Recurring cast ===
- Miran Kurspahić as Martin Prosinečki
- Mia Begović as Lili Prosinečki
- Joško Ševo as Ivan Pavić
- Mirela Brekalo as Anđa Pavić

== Series overview ==
Season	Episodes	Originally released	
Season	Episodes	First released	Last released
1	64	9 November 2020	26 March 2021
2	65	29 November 2021	18 March 2022

== Production ==
The series is written by Mirna Miličić i Vlado Bulić. The filming of the series began in February 2020. The first episode was broadcast on 9 November 2020 on RTL.

The filming of the second season began in June 2021.
