= Provjereno =

Croatian television series

- Genre: Investigative journalism Current affairs
- Presented by: Marija Miholjek (2007–2009); Ivana Paradžiković (2009–2021); Mato Barišić (2021-present)
- Country of origin: Croatia
- Original language: Croatian
- No. of seasons: 17
- No. of episodes: 682

Production
- Executive producer: Antonio Blašković
- Producer: Lovro Lajoš
- Camera setup: Single-camera
- Running time: 48 minutes

Original release
- Network: Nova TV
- Release: September 5, 2007 – present

Provjereno is a Croatian investigative journalism television news magazine that aired on Nova TV. The series premiered in 2007 and is hosted by Ema Branica.

Provjereno focuses on investigative journalism reports in Croatia, including social and political issues, is also well-known for its experimental reports and segments that are occasionally more light-hearted. Because the series often deals with corruption and crime, many of the journalists have received threats over the years. Despite this, Provjereno is credited with exposing many cases of crime, corruption and governmental negligence in Croatia.

== Overview ==
Provjereno premiered in September 2007 and was hosted by Marija Mihojlek for its first two seasons. In 2009, Ivana Paradžiković took over as host and managing editor of the series. In May 2021, after 12 years, Paradžiković left Provjereno and Nova TV. The series is hosted by Mato Barišić and Ema Branica. The tenth season premiered on 17 November 2016, the thirteenth season on 14 February 2019. As of 2026, Provjereno has 17 seasons and has 700 episodes in total.

== Awards and nominations ==
Ivana Pradžiković received the Joško Kulušić award of the Croatian Helsinki Committee for promoting human rights, as well as the Večernjakova ruža person of the year award. Danka Derifaj received the Velebitska degenija award two years in a row for her contribution to environmental protection, as well as the Marija Jurić-Zagorka award of the Croatian Journalists' Association.

The series itself has received Zlatni studio and Večernjakova ruža awards in 2019.
