= Divlje pčele =

- The promotional poster for the series
- Genre: Family drama
- Based on: Agries melisses by: Melina Tsampani; Petros Kalkovalis
- Written by: Iva Ilakovac; Marija Antić; Višna Mamić; Nikolina Bogdanović; Danko Delač; Mihaela Erceg
- Directed by: Kristijan Milić; Ivan Pavličić; Jasna Nanut; Stanislav Tomić; Jadran Puharić; Rahela Jagrič Pirc
- Starring: Ana Marija Veselčić; Lidija Kordić; Lidija Penić-Grgaš
- Composer: Ante Gelo
- Country of origin: Croatia
- Original language: Croatian
- No. of seasons: 2
- No. of episodes: 150

Production
- Executive producers: Iva Grahor; Danijel Ivoš
- Running time: 50 minutes
- Production company: RTL

Original release
- Network: RTL / Voyo
- Release: 3 November 2025 – present

Divlje pčele (Croatian for 'Wild Bees') is a Croatian family drama television series that premiered on 3 November 2025 on RTL. It is a remake of the Greek series Agries melisses.

The first season concluded on 8 June 2026. The second season premiered on 21 September 2026.

== Premise ==
Set in the 1950s, the series focuses on three sisters, Katarina, Cvita, and Zora, who navigate the life in a traditional, patriarchal village. To help her family, the eldest sister Katarina agrees to marry the wealthiest man in the village, unaware of his hidden intentions.

== Cast ==
- Ana Marija Veselčić as Katarina Runje, the eldest sister Runje
- Lidija Kordić as Zora Runje, the youngest sister Runje
- Lidija Penić-Grgaš as Cvita Runje, middle sister Runje
- Alain Blažević as Ante Vukas, one of the Vukas brothers
- Sanja Vejnović as Mirjana Vukas, Ante's wife
- Ivan Barišić as Nikola Vukas, Ante and Mirjana's youngest son
- Marin Klišmanić as Marko Vukas (from episode 70 onwards), Ante and Mirjana's middle son
  - Antonio Agostini portrayed Marko Vukas until episode 68
- Klemen Novak as Petar Vukas, Ante and Mirjana's eldest son
- Margarita Mladinić as Tereza Vukas, Ante and Mirjana's only daughter and youngest child
- Dragan Veselić as Ivica Vukas, the other Vukas brother
- Luka Šegota as Jakov Vukas, Ivica's older son
- Matko Jukić as Josip "Joso" Vukas, Ivica's younger son
- Arija Rizvić as Teodora Vukas, Jakov's wife and Ivica's daughter-in-law
- Jelena Perčin as Rajka Bauer, Ante and Ivica's widowed sister from Geneva
- Davor Pavić as Milan Čavka, Ante's henchman
- Marija Borić Jerneić as Karmela Poljak, the divorced owner of a local kavana
- Antonija Julija Blaće as Luce Matić, the owner of a local tailor shop and Cvita's boss
- Jasmin Mekić as Zdravko Šušnjara, the mayor of Vrilo
- Monika Vuco as Anka Šušnjara, Zdravko's wife
- Vladimir Posavec Tušek as Ranko Badurina, a retired army general
- Alen Šalinović as Jerko Sikirica, local Militia chief
- Mirela Brekalo as Manda Sikirica, Jerko's mother
- Amar Bukvić as Toma Domazet, a newcomer to Vrilo
- Matija Kačan as Veljko Budimir, a barman at Karmela's kavana
- Antonio Scarpa as Željko Budimir, a local barber and Veljko's brother
- Zijad Gračić as Don Jere, the local Catholic priest
- Jolanda Tudor as Grandma Ljuba, a local shopkeeper and midwife
- Jasna Bilušić as Ferida, Ante and Mirjana's housemaid

== Series overview ==
Season	Episodes	Originally released	
Season	Episodes	First released	Last released
1	150	3 November 2025	8 June 2026
2	TBA	21 September 2026	TBA

== Production ==
RTL announced the series on 3 October 2025. The filming took place in the Dalmatian Hinterland.
