= Kad smo bili mali =

Croatian children's television series

- Presented by: Tatjana Horvatić
- Country of origin: Croatia
- Original language: Croatian
- No. of seasons: 3
- No. of episodes: 49

Production
- Producer: Sanja Zdorc
- Running time: 10–20 minutes

Original release
- Network: RTL Kockica
- Release: 28 November 2022 – present

Kad smo bili mali (lit. 'When We Were Little') is a Croatian talk show television series for children. Each episode features a celebrity guest who talks about their childhood. The series premiered on 28 November 2022 on RTL Kockica.

== Series overview ==
Season	Episodes	Originally released	
Season	Episodes	First released	Last released
1	20	28 November 2022	23 December 2022
2	14	14 October 2023	31 December 2023
3	15	18 November 2024	27 December 2024

=== Season 1 (2022) ===
1. Marija Starčević
2. Mia Dimšić
3. Davor Balažin
4. Edin Mehmedović
5. Petra Kurtela
6. Andrea Andrassy
7. Nika Turković
8. Nenad Hadžihajdić – PVT Mole
9. Goran Šprem
10. Ana Radišić
11. Matko Knešaurek
12. Matija Cvek
13. Ana Brdarić Boljat
14. Sandi Pego
15. Tomislav Jelinčić
16. Ida Prester
17. Domagoj Jakopović – Ribafish
18. Ivan Šarić
19. Andrea Trgovčević Iličić
20. Zoran Aragović

=== Season 2 (2023) ===
1. Sandra Tolić
2. Dorian Ribarić
3. Filip Brkić
4. Sementa Rajhard
5. Saša Lozar
6. Fran Miholjević
7. Josip Brakus
8. Manuela Svorcan
9. Ivan Dečak
10. Tea Šimić
11. Ida Hamer
12. Igor Drvenkar
13. Asim Ugljen
14. Ivana Radovniković

=== Season 3 (2024) ===
1. Kim Verson
2. Antonia Matković Šerić
3. Vanda Winter
4. Jan Kovačić
5. Jan Kerekeš
6. Ivanka Mazurkijević and Damir Martinović
7. Marco Cuccurin
8. Filip Sertić
9. Marko Vargek
10. Mirna Čužić
11. Arija Rizvić
12. Iva Šimić Šakoronja and Gloria Dubelj
13. Mario Mandarić
14. Ana Bago Tomac
15. Siniša Pašić
