= Pobjednici =

2025 Croatian television series

- The official title card for the series
- Genre: Documentary
- Directed by: Goran Ribarić
- Presented by: Ida Prester
- Composers: Roko Crnić; Ida Prester; Hrvoje Klemenčić
- Country of origin: Croatia
- Original language: Croatian
- No. of seasons: 2
- No. of episodes: 12

Production
- Executive producer: Iva Tkalec
- Running time: 25 minutes
- Production company: Kinoteka

Original release
- Network: HRT 1
- Release: 14 April 2025 – 25 May 2026

Pobjednici (Croatian for 'Winners') is a Croatian documentary television series. Hosted by Ida Prester, the series explores the lives of people with disabilities and those overcoming difficult life circumstances.

The first season of the series aired on HRT 1 from 14 April to 26 May 2025. The second season premiered on 20 April 2026.

== Episodes ==
Season	Episodes	Originally released	
Season	Episodes	First released	Last released
1	6	14 April 2025	26 May 2025
2	6	20 April 2026	25 May 2026

=== Season 1 (2025) ===
No. overall	No. in season	Title	Original release date
1	1	"Boje zvuka"	14 April 2025
This episode follows Marko, a blind drummer and alternative music podcaster, and Suzana, a spirited blind actress and journalist, as they share their passion.
2	2	"Odrastanje bez roditelja"	21 April 2025
This episode follows Maja and Rijad, who grew up in children's homes, as they navigate adulthood. Rijad returns to his hometown as a successful actor, and Maja begins an independent life with the support of her grandmother and former caregiver.
3	3	"Sloboda pokreta"	5 May 2025
This episode follows Karla, a wheelchair basketball player, and Tamara, a wheelchair dancer and choreographer, as they navigate daily challenges, training, and moments with loved ones.
4	4	"Biti svoj"	12 May 2025
This episode follows Leonardo, a physicist, and Azra, a journalist, who come from different backgrounds but share experiences of peer violence and rejection.
5	5	"Novi dom"	19 May 2025
This episode follows Samane, an Iranian woman who escaped an abusive forced marriage and built a new life in Zagreb with her children, as well as the Konovalov family, Ukrainian refugees who found stability in Osijek through table tennis, as they were brought to Croatia by a search for peace and safety.
6	6	"Snaga volje"	26 May 2025
This episode follows the Novina and Rinčić families, who refused to give up despite dire medical predictions about their children.

=== Season 2 (2026) ===
No. overall	No. in season	Title	Original release date
7	1	"Život u kolicima"	20 April 2026
The episodes features the stories of Sven and Nina, who are wheelchair users.
8	2	"Ovdje sam doma"	27 April 2026
9	3	"Dan po dan"	4 May 2026
10	4	"Život bez ovisnosti"	11 May 2026
Three young people who fell into addiction and hit rock bottom fight their way back to recovery.
11	5	"Igra u tišini"	18 May 2026
Two athletes who have been deaf since early childhood rise from a world of silence to Olympic gold.
12	6	"Tek smo krenuli"	25 May 2026
A retired couple rediscovers themselves and proves that older people aren’t out of the game but true winners with wisdom, and experience.
