= Dođi, pogodi, osvoji =

- Genre: Game show
- Based on: The Price Is Right by: Bob Stewart; Mark Goodson; Bill Todman
- Presented by: Antonija Blaće; Marin Ivanović – Stoka
- Country of origin: Croatia
- Original language: Croatian
- No. of seasons: 4
- No. of episodes: 251

Production
- Running time: 30–40 minutes

Original release
- Network: RTL
- Release: 11 October 2021 – 26 June 2025

Dođi, pogodi, osvoji (English translation: Come, Guess, Win) is a Croatian game show television series based on the American format of The Price Is Right. Hosted by Antonija Blaće and Marin Ivanović – Stoka, the game show sees contestants playing various games of guessing the prices of different products in order to win prizes.

The series premiered on 11 October 2021 on RTL. Starting from 17 March 2025, the final 20 episodes of the third season, as well as new episodes of the fourth season were broadcast simultaneously. The series aired from Mondays to Fridays at 17:00.

== Series overview ==
Season	Episodes		Originally released	
Season	Episodes		First released	Last released
1	60		11 October 2021	31 December 2021
2	80		7 March 2022	24 June 2022
3	100	80	30 January 2023	19 May 2023
3	100	20	2025	26 June 2025
4	11		17 March 2025	2025
