= Večera za 5 =

- The title card for the series
- Also known as: Večera za 5 na selu
- Genre: Reality competition; Cookery
- Based on: Come Dine with Me by ITV Studios
- Presented by: Former presenters; Antonija Blaće; Lorena Nosić; Marko Lušić; Belma Hodžić; Ivan Šarić
- Country of origin: Croatia
- Original language: Croatian
- No. of seasons: 17
- No. of episodes: 1600+

Production
- Camera setup: Multi-camera
- Running time: 45–60 minutes
- Production companies: RTL Televizija; OHT Productions; Paprika Studios

Original release
- Network: RTL
- Release: 14 May 2007 – present

Večera za 5 (Croatian for 'Dinner for 5'), also known as Večera za 5 na selu (Croatian for 'Dinner for 5 in the Countryside') between 2019 and 2023, is a Croatian reality television cooking show based on the British television series Come Dine with Me. The series follows a group of contestants as they taste and rate the meals they prepared for each other; the highest-scoring contestant receives a prize.

It is the longest-running reality television series in Croatia, with over 1600 episodes broadcast since 2007.

== Format ==
Each cycle consist of one week, i.e. of five episodes that feature a group of five contestants and air from Monday to Friday. Each day, one of the five contestants prepares a three-course dinner for others. The contestants rate each other's dinners, with the highest-scoring contestant declared the winner of the week and earning a monetary prize.

== History ==
The series premiered on 14 May 2007 and ran until 29 June 2012. During this period, the series featured a host who visited the contestants and accompanied them through the dinner preparation process. The hosts were Antonija Blaće (2007), Lorena Nosić (2008), Marko Lušić (2008–2009), Belma Hodžić (2009–2010), and Ivan Šarić (2010–2012).

After a hiatus, the series was revived in 2019 under the title Večera za 5 na selu (English: Dinner for 5 at the Countryside). The format remained the same, but the contestant were people from rural areas of Croatia, and the emphasis was on preparing traditional meals specific for their region. A host was no longer featured; an off-screen narrator, who interviewed the contestant during their meal preparation and provided commentary during dinner, was present instead.

In August 2023, the series returned to airing under its original title, Večera za 5. In February 2026, the series introduced a new scoring system: each contestant awarded up to 10 points for the dinner, as well as up to 10 points for the atmosphere, bringing the maximal score the contestants can earn to 80.

== Series overview ==
Season	Original run
Večera za 5
1	14 May – 29 June 2007
2	3 September – 18 December 2007
3	11 February – 20 June 2008
4	1 September 2008 – 19 June 2009
5	7 September – 20 November 2009
6	22 February – 4 June 2010
7	13 September – 10 December 2010
8	14 February – 27 May 2011
9	5 September 2011 – 29 June 2012
Večera za 5 na selu
10	27 May – 2 August 2019
11	27 January – 13 March 2020
12	7 September – 6 November 2020
13	29 March – 11 June 2021
14	6 September – 26 November 2021
15	21 March – 8 July 2022
16	29 August 2022 – 16 June 2023
Večera za 5
17	28 August 2023 – 24 May 2024
