= Gospodin Savršeni =

- Genre: Dating game show
- Based on: The Bachelor by Mike Fleiss
- Presented by: Antonija Blaće; Marko Vargek
- Country of origin: Croatia
- Original languages: Croatian; Serbian
- No. of seasons: 5
- No. of episodes: 146

Production
- Producer: Antonija Blaće
- Running time: 55–80 minutes

Original release
- Network: RTL
- Release: 19 November 2018 – 6 May 2022
- Network: Voyo (Note: Since season 4 in 2025, RTL usually broadcast each episode one week after their release on Voyo.)
- Release: 27 January 2025 – present

Related
- The Bachelor (franchise)

Gospodin Savršeni (Croatian for 'Mister Perfect') is a Croatian dating reality television series based on The Bachelor. The show centers on a single bachelor who has to select a fiancée from a group of participants.

Five seasons have aired so far since the show's debut on 19 November 2018 on RTL. Since the fourth season, which premiered on 27 January 2025, the show is released on Voyo first, with RTL broadcasting each episode a week later. The series has been renewed for a fifth season, which premiered on 26 January 2026.

== Production ==
The series is hosted by Antonija Blaće. The filming for the first season took place during September 2018 near Zagreb.

In June 2024, RTL announced that the fourth season is being filmed on the island of Rhodes in Greece, making it the first time the series takes place outside of Croatia. In February 2025, the series has been renewed for a fifth season.

=== Format ===
The show focuses on a single bachelor who has to select a fiancée from a list of potential partners. The Bachelor ultimately selects his last candidate to whom he might offer a marriage proposal at the end of the season after eliminating applicants each week. Through each season, the bachelor and the candidates go on several dates in order to get to know each other and test their chemistry. On their dates, the contestants visit romantic and exotic places. The elimination-style format of the show is the source of all internal and external tensions in the series.

== Series overview ==
Season	Episodes	Originally released			Bachelor(s)	Winner(s)	Runner(s)-up
Season	Episodes	First released	Last released	Network	Bachelor(s)	Winner(s)	Runner(s)-up
1	20	19 November 2018	20 December 2018	RTL	Goran Juranec	Hana Rodić	Iva Runjanin
2	24	9 September 2019	17 October 2019	RTL	Mijo Matić	Nuša Rojs	Mihaela Muhvić
3	30	21 March 2022	6 May 2022	RTL	Toni Šćulac	Stankica Stojanović	Karolina Ljiljak
4	32	27 January 2025	20 March 2025	Voyo	Šime Elez Miloš Mićović	Vanja Stanojević Maida Ribić	Marinela Grljušić Barbara Mandarić
5	40	26 January 2026	8 April 2026	Voyo	Karlo Godec Petar Rašić	Kaja Casar Anastasia Kaleb	—N/a

=== Season 1 (2018) ===
In August 2018, RTL announced that the first bachelor of the series is Goran Jurenec, who was born and raised in Berlin. The first season debuted on 19 November 2018 on RTL.

The candidates in order of their entrance were Nandi Uzelac, Hana Rodić, Gabrijela Fatorić, Iva Runjanin, Karla Krneta, Klara Perko, Marija Malenica, Mirna Gostinski, Ana Raščan, Alena Anezi Nezirević, Daisy Zaccarin, Aleksandra Mitrović, Ivana Milat, Klavdija Kolar, Vahdela Vlahović, Ana Tomičić, Rada Tomić, Ivana Kopilaš, and Vesna Stanić. After 20 episodes, the season concluded on 20 December 2018. Jurenec picked Hana Rodić as the winner of the season.

=== Season 2 (2019) ===
The bachelor for the second season was Mijo Matić from Sisak.

The candidates in order of their entrance were Monika Kelčec, Emily Živčić, Maja Đukanović, Gabrijela Divković, Silvia Pokrajac, Samra Čataković, Nuša Rojs, Barbara Mucić, Mihaela Muhvić, Julie Pavlović, Anita Martinović, Andrea Galić, Ena Rahić, Alenka Šoštarić, Sara Janković, Tesa Šokota, Renata Dobrec, Maria Protulipac, and Nikolina Tutić. Matić selected Nuša Rojc as the winner of the season.

=== Season 3 (2022) ===
The bachelor for the third season was Toni Šćulac from Split.

=== Season 4 (2025) ===
In June 2024, RTL announced that the fourth season was set to be filmed on Rhodes in Greece. In October 2024, Blaće was confirmed to return as the host of the season. In December 2024, RTL revealed that the bachelor for the fourth season is Šime Elez from Split. On 20 January 2025, RTL revealed that Miloš Mićović from Serbia is the second bachelor of the season, marking the first time two bachelors were featured in a single season.

The season premiered 27 January 2025 on RTL's streaming service Voyo. RTL began broadcasting the season a week later, on 3 February. The season concluded on 20 March 2025. Elez selected Vanja as the winner, whereas Mićović selected Maida.

=== Season 5 (2026) ===
On 1 December 2025, RTL announced that the fifth season would be hosted by Marko Vargek. The season premiered on 26 January 2026 on Voyo, and on 2 February on RTL. The bachelors of the season are Karlo Godec from Zagreb and Petar Rašić from Kragujevac.

The release of the final four episodes was postponed on Voyo by one week to allow RTL’s broadcast to catch up. The concluding week of the season aired from 5 to 8 April on Voyo and from 6 to 9 April on RTL.
