= RTL Kockica =

- Country: Croatia
- Broadcast area: Croatia
- Headquarters: Zagreb, Croatia

Programming
- Language: Croatian
- Picture format: 1080i (16:9 HDTV)

Ownership
- Owner: RTL Hrvatska (CME)
- Sister channels: RTL; RTL 2; RTL Living; RTL Crime; RTL Passion; RTL Adria; RTL Croatia World

History
- Launched: 11 January 2014; 12 years ago

Links
- Website: www.rtl.hr

Availability

Terrestrial
- OiV: MUX M2

Streaming media
- Affiliated Streaming Service: Voyo

RTL Kockica is a Croatian specialized television channel for children, young people and families owned by the CME Group as of 1 June 2022. RTL Kockica started broadcasting on 11 January 2014 at 11:01 am.

On 15 March 2021, RTL Kockica unveiled a new visual identity and a new logo.

== History ==
RTL Kockica launched at 11:01am on 11 January 2014. Initial programming included a mix of mostly European productions with a raft of Croatian content. With its launch, it became the first terrestrial children's channel in Croatia.

== Programming ==
=== Original programming ===
The channel produces a wide array of original programming, which consists mostly of small-scale production series airmed at children and intended for education or entertainment.

Since 2023, RTL's streaming service Voyo offers a section titled Voyo Kids, which enables access to majority of RTL Kockica's programming catalogue.

RTL Kockica original programming
Title	Description	Premiere	Ref.
Etno sat	A series about Croatian traditions	2016	
Baby Zoo	A series about animals	2018	
Idemo u Zoo	A series about animals	2018	
Sport za sve	A series about sport	2018	
Jezikoslovci	A series for learning English and German languages	9 September 2019	
Jeste li znali?	A series about various trivia facts	11 November 2019	
Zoopedija	A series about animals	2020	
Tehnolovac	A series about technology	1 February 2019	
Djeca kuhaju	A series about cooking	2021	
Vesela učionica	A pre-school educational series	1 March 2021	
Razigrani laboratorij	A series about science	17 May 2021	
Tajne vrta	A series about gardening	6 September 2021	
Kockićeve priče	Fictional stories	19 November 2021	
Ententinići	Animated series	12 December 2021	
Prijatelji planeta	A series about ecology	2022	
Zagrepčanke i dečki	A series about dancing	2022	
Kockić i prijatelji	Animated series	16 May 2022	
Kad smo bili mali	A talk show series with celebrity guests	28 November 2022	
SOS za životinjski svijet	A series about animals	2023	

=== Acquired programming ===
RTL Kockica mostly airs Croatian dubs of foreign animated and live-action television series aimed at children and teenagers. In the evening, the channel also occasionally re-runs foreign sitcom series such as The Nanny, Malcolm in the Middle, and Only Fools and Horses.

The following television series were acquired by RTL Kockica from Disney Junior and Disney Channel:

- Violetta
- Doc McStuffins
- Jake and the Never Land Pirates
- Soy Luna
- Mickey Mouse Clubhouse
- Sofia the First
- Phineas and Ferb
- The Lion Guard
- Miraculous: Tales of Ladybug and Cat Noir

== Identity ==
The official mascot of the channel is Kockić, a square-shaped character with blue, yellow and red colours that resembles the channel's logo. RTL has sold various Kockić-themed children merchandise, including a Kockić plushie.

RTL Kockica also aired Kockićeve priče ("Kockić's Stories"), a series in which notable people read children's stores; it premiered on 19 November 2021. A short interactive animated series titled Kockić i prijatelji ("Kockić and Friends"), where the character and his friends undergo various adventures and solve everyday problems, premiered on the channel on 16 May 2022.
