= Život na vagi =

- The title card for the series
- Genre: Reality competition
- Based on: The Biggest Loser by: Ben Silverman; Mark Koops; Dave Broome
- Presented by: Marijana Batinić (s. 1–4, 6–8); Sanja Žuljević (s. 5); Antonija Blaće (s. 9)
- Country of origin: Croatia
- Original language: Croatian
- No. of seasons: 9
- No. of episodes: 337

Production
- Producers: Vanja Meandžija; Antonija Blaće

Original release
- Network: RTL
- Release: 27 March 2017 – present

Život na vagi (English: Life on the Scales) is a Croatian reality competition television series based on The Biggest Loser. The series follows overweight contestants on their weight loss journey; the contestant to lose the most weight wins a cash prize.

The series debuted on 27 March 2017 on RTL. The ninth season of the series premiered on 1 September 2025.

== Format ==
Overweight and obese people are invited to apply for the show; a number of selected competitors is presented in the first episode of each season. Each season usually begins with selected competitors introducing themselves and conducting a preliminary weighing to determine the weight with which they entered the season. The contestants are divided into two teams (usually Red and Blue teams) and are placed in a house where they reside throughout their time on the show.

Each cycle, the contestants work out and undergo a vast array of physical and sport challenges such as running or climbing; each team has a professional fitness coach who leads them through the process. The show also employs nutritionists and other health professionals to educate the contestants about healthy eating habits. The contestants are also encouraged to follow a strict diet during their time on the show.

After each cycle, weighing takes place again to determine which contestants lost the most and the least weight; the percentages of lost weight are taken into consideration to rank the contestants. These who lost the least weight are subject to elimination; they either leave the show immediately (if they are under "the red line") or via group voting (if they are under "the yellow line").

The finalist who lost the highest percentage of his or her body mass is declared winner of the season and wins a cash prize. Another cash prize is also given to a "non-finalist winner," the eliminated contestant who lost the most weight outside of the show following their elimination.

== Hosts and professionals ==
The series is hosted by Marijana Batinić. Due to her 2020 pregnancy, Batinić was temporarily replaced by Sanja Žuljević, who was previously one of the coaches for the first three seasons. The ninth season is hosted by Antonija Blaće.

Each season features two main coaches, each for one competing team. The sixth season featured a third "secret" team of contestants who were eliminated at the beginning of the season, but continued participating at a secret location until they were merged with the main teams mid-season; they were coached by Sanja Žuljević.

Other professionals have a recurring role in the series as well. Ana Bučević was the show's motivational speaker for the first three seasons. Martina Linarić is the nutritionist since the show's fourth season.

Hosts and coaches on Život na vagi
Person	Season								
Person	1	2	3	4	5	6	7	8	9
Marijana Batinić	Host				Guest	Host			
Sanja Žuljević	Coach				Host	Coach			
Antonija Blaće									Host
Mario Mlinarić	Coach								
Edin Mehmedović				Coach					
Maja Ćustić				Coach					
Mirna Čužić							Coach		

== Series overview ==
Season	Episodes	Originally released		Winner	Non-finalist winner
Season	Episodes	First released	Last released	Winner	Non-finalist winner
1	25	27 March 2017	6 May 2017	Ivan Krolo	Gabrijela Crnjac
2	25	4 November 2017	16 December 2017	Dorian Crnković	Jelena Putnik
3	46	16 September 2018	18 November 2018	Alen Abramović	Irena Štetić Andrin
4	37	19 October 2019	9 December 2019	Roko Baković	Mirna Posavec
5	37	17 October 2020	5 December 2020	Matej Petrović	Zdravka Kapetanović
6	37	26 September 2022	19 November 2022	Josip Čapo	Dalibor Kujundžić
7	39	4 September 2023	4 January 2024	Mislav Šepić	Pero Jukić
8	44	2 September 2024	6 December 2024	Alina Pantseyeva	Nikolina Radušić
9	45	1 September 2025	31 October 2025	Dominik Šarić	Marija Bartulović
