= Brak na prvu =

- The title card for the series
- Genre: Dating reality show
- Based on: Gift ved første blik
- Country of origin: Croatia
- Original language: Croatian
- No. of seasons: 5
- No. of episodes: 167

Production
- Producer: Vanja Meandžija
- Running time: 50–60 minutes

Original release
- Network: RTL
- Release: 16 March 2020 – 29 May 2025

Brak na prvu (Croatian for 'Marriage at First Sight') is a Croatian dating reality television series based on the Danish format of Gift ved første blik. It is a part of the global Married at First Sight television franchise. The series features a group of couples, paired up by relationship experts, who agree to marry when they first meet, as the series follows their relationship progress after the marriage.

Brak na prvu premiered on 16 March 2020 on RTL. The fifth season premiered on 24 March 2025.

== Production ==
=== Format ===
Each season starts with a marriage of couples who were paired up by experts; the couples are strangers who have never met each other. After the marriage, the couples have a honeymoon, and the series continues to follow their relationship. During the season, the couples spend time with each other and have meetings with the experts to report on the progress of their relationship.

At the end of the season, the couples decide whether or not they want to stay married.

=== Experts ===
Each season features three experts who pair up the candidates. The experts also track the candidates' relationship progress throughout the seasons, discussing the issues they encountered in their relationships and providing help with overcoming them.

Boris Blažinić, Ingrid Divković and Ita Štefanek were the experts for the first season of the series. For the second season, Blažinić was joined by Sanela Kovačević and Iva Stasiow. In March 2025, RTL announced that Iva Stasiow will be joined by Matej Sakoman and Dean Pelić as the experts for the fifth season.

Experts on Brak na prvu
| Expert | Season | | | | |
| Expert | 1 | 2 | 3 | 4 | 5 |
|---|---|---|---|---|---|
| Boris Blažinić | Main | | | | |
| Ingrid Divković | Main | | | | |
| Ita Štefanek | Main | | | | |
| Sanela Kovačević | | Main | | | |
| Iva Stasiow | | Main | | | |
| Matej Sakoman | | | | | Main |
| Dean Pelić | | | | | Main |

== Series overview ==
| Season | Episodes | Originally released | |
| Season | Episodes | First released | Last released |
|---|---|---|---|
| 1 | 26 | 16 March 2020 | 29 April 2020 |
| 2 | 30 | 12 October 2021 | 7 December 2021 |
| 3 | 31 | 30 January 2023 | 13 March 2023 |
| 4 | 40 | 29 January 2024 | 11 June 2023 |
| 5 | 40 | 24 March 2025 | 29 May 2025 |
