= Ljubav je na selu =

- The title card for the series
- Genre: Dating reality show
- Based on: Farmer Wants a Wife by Fremantle
- Presented by: Anita Martinović
- Country of origin: Croatia
- Original language: Croatian
- No. of seasons: 18
- No. of episodes: 433

Production
- Camera setup: Multi-camera
- Running time: 60 minutes
- Production company: Fremantle

Original release
- Network: RTL
- Release: 4 September 2008 – present

Ljubav je na selu (English: Love is at the Countryside) is a Croatian reality television series based on the British television series Farmer Wants a Wife. The series follows farmers from rural parts of Croatia looking for romantic partners.

The series premiered on 4 September 2008 on RTL. It is one of the longest-running Croatian reality series, having entered its eighteenth season in May 2025.

== Format ==
For every new season, RTL broadcasts an episode where a group of farmers introduce themselves and their farms to the viewers. The farmers are usually male, but so far three female farmers haven been featured throughout the series as well. After the episode airs, the viewers can apply to meet the farmer of their liking by contacting RTL via e-mail or phone. The viewers are required to write a letter where they introduce themselves to the farmer.

A few months later, after the application period expires, the farmers who received the most letters from the viewers qualify for participating in the series. The farmers get to meet the candidates that expressed interest in them in front of the cameras and invite a few of them (usually three to four) to their farms, where most of the series takes place. As the season progresses, farmers eliminate candidates one by one, until selecting a single candidate whom they take on a romantic journey.

== Hosts ==
The series employs a host who guides the farmers and their candidates through the series. The hosts brings the letters to the farmers and occasionally visits their farms through the season to check on the progress of their relationships with the candidates.

Croatian actress and former television host Lorena Nosić hosted the first two seasons of the show, until Marijana Batinić took over and hosted the show from season 3 to 12. In March 2021, RTL announced that Anita Martinović is taking the role of the host starting from the show's 13th season.

Hosts on Ljubav je na selu
Host	Season																	
Host	1	2	3	4	5	6	7	8	9	10	11	12	13	14	15	16	17	18
Lorena Nosić	Main																	
Marijana Batinić			Main															
Anita Martinović													Main					

== Broadcast and release ==
The series is a part of RTL's staple programming, having been on air uninterruptedly since 2008. Excluding the network's news programming, it is RTL's second longest-running original series, following culinary series Večera za 5 (Croatian iteration of Come Dine with Me), which has been on air since 2007.

For the first six seasons, the series employed a weekly format with one episode a week being aired. Since the show's seventh season, which premiered in 2016, the series airs several episodes a week. As of September 2023, with the premiere of the show's 16th season, RTL's streaming service Voyo releases each episode 24 hours before their television broadcast. As of 2019, the series also airs in Slovenia on Pop TV.

== Series overview ==
Season	Farmers introduction	Episodes	Originally released	
Season	Farmers introduction	Episodes	First released	Last released
1	4 September 2008	12	15 January 2009	14 April 2009
2	10 September 2009	14	3 April 2010	22 June 2010
3	29 May 2011	14	22 January 2012	28 April 2012
4	8 July 2012	14	10 February 2013	3 May 2013
5	20 July 2014	12	2 October 2014	14 December 2014
6	5 June 2015	14	27 February 2016	23 March 2016
7	3 June 2016	22	3 October 2016	29 November 2016
8	15 May 2017	25	10 September 2017	1 November 2017
9	4 January 2018	28	1 April 2018	31 May 2018
10	11 June 2018	25	3 February 2019	13 March 2019
11	14 March 2019	25	8 September 2019	17 October 2019
12	1 May 2019	25	9 February 2020	18 March 2020
13	28 June 2020	25	11 April 2021	31 May 2021
14	1 June 2021	25	8 May 2022	9 June 2022
15	10 June 2022	25	14 March 2023	14 April 2023
16	17 June 2023	42	6 September 2023	8 December 2023
17	22 May 2024	45	9 September 2024	20 December 2024
18	17 May 2025	41	3 November 2025	15 January 2026

=== Farmers ===
Season	Farmers
1	Mato Smolčić, Tomislav Copić, Ivan Đurašević, Franjo Kolarić, Petar Benčić, Marinko Sarić, Denis Tikel, Andrija Vitković
2	
3	
4	
5	
6	
7	
8	
9	Domagoj Škobić, Anto Vardić, Ivan Marenić, Boris Kovačić, Vatroslav Tijan, Miljenko Mišić, Josip Ćiritović, Dario Gašparić, Hrvoje Gregurić, Ivan Kosar, Mladen Vidulin
10	Dragan Ljiljak, Ljubo Bebić, Ivica Mušćet, Željko Bilić, Boris Kolesarić, Marko Skelin, Pavo Štivić, Jovan Karapandža, Miljenko Vrančić, Josip Krizmanić, Kristijan Vrban
11	Daniel Granja, Darinka Ljubica Goravica Green, Domino Santro, Srećko Ponjavic, Jack Vukoja
12	Dušan Golubovac, Hakija Špago, Ivan Putnik, Ivica Jurjević, Josip Tratnjak, Josip Vodička, Mihael Derdić, Miro Vojvodić, Stjepan Basarić, Stjepan Skočak, Valter Krastić
13	Danijel Karabaić, Dragan Kežić, Ivica Džaja, Jure Salopek, Jurica Živoder, Marijan Ceravac, Marko Punčec, Neven Landek, Rasema Vladetić, Zoran Mudri, Zoran Stričević
14	Nenad Lekšić, Ante Brčić, Zdravko Tomešić, Tomislav Skejić, Ivo Lepeš, Darko Rožić, Damir Toplek, Branko Stanša, Krunoslav Pavlaković, Josip Ranogajec, Milan Milinković
15	Ivan Damijanić, Dragoljub Kostić, Zvonko Šantalab, Hrvoje Špoljarec, Nikola Macut, Milan Ercegović, Ljubo Šerman, Jerko Odžak, Siniša Marković, Đuro Osman, Ive Pavlović
16	Branko Jurković, Ante Munitić, Ivan Detković, Jožef Mastnak, Mijo Bošnjak, Miroslav Dekalić, Radoslav Biskupović, Stjepan Runtas, Tihomir Petrović, Vinko Gržan
17	Darko Školnik, Ilija Strinčić, Ivica Turas, Ivo Obreza, Manuel Mandić, Mate Begović, Sandi Hribernik, Toni Patrčević, Vjekoslav Šajnić, Željko Stipetić, Zlatko Jakupović
18	Tomislav Bičanić, Dalibor Bogović, Josip Đerfi, Ante Sokoša, Dejan Nešić, Željko Dragojlović, Robert Horvatić, Dušan Karan, Bernard Leskovar, Josip Ercegović

== Legacy ==
=== Success and impact ===
The show's main goal, which is to help farmers find love, was achieved numerous times with several romantic relationships of past participants continuing off-screen. By 2021, seventeen couples that meet on-screen got married after the show; eighteen children were born out of these marriages.

Some participants of the show through the years gained attention from the Croatian public and media, becoming instant celebrities. Most notable examples include Nevenka Bekavac, a season 5 participant, whose bold personality attracted several Croatian outlets to write about her personal life after the series. In 2020, Bahra Zahirović was quickly dubbed "the star of season 12" by numerous media due to her unique personality. As reported by 24sata, her unique expressions became known as "Bahrizmi" (Bahrisms).

=== Controversies ===
As season 13 started airing in April 2021, one of the farmers was met with a negative reaction from the public due to his tattoo that contained Schutzstaffel's motto. RTL issued a public statement saying that all of the farmer's scenes will be completely removed for the rest of the season's broadcast. Another farmer was disqualified shortly after he was introduced as one of season 14 farmers in June 2021. The disqualification occurred after RTL discovered that he omitted the fact that he has a child and lied about his mother abandoning him at the age of 13.

A season 15 episode aired in April 2023 featured a farmer eliminating one of the female candidates by violently throwing cake into her face. Given the negative tensions between the farmer and the candidate, the fans deemed it violence against women and reprimanded RTL for airing such content. RTL issued a public statement expressing that the farmer's act of throwing cake was intended as a joke. The scene was removed from the re-run of the episode the following day and from the episode's release on RTL's streaming service (then RTL Play).
