= MasterChef Croatia =

- The title card for the series
- Genre: Reality competition
- Based on: MasterChef by Franc Roddam
- Judges: Stjepan Vukadin; Goran Kočiš; Mario Mihelj
- Country of origin: Croatia
- Original language: Croatian
- No. of seasons: 9
- No. of episodes: 450+

Production
- Running time: 70–100 minutes

Original release
- Network: Nova TV
- Release: 21 March 2011 – present

MasterChef Croatia (Croatian: MasterChef Hrvatska) is a Croatian competitive reality television cooking show. It is the Croatian iteration of the MasterChef franchise. In an elimination-based format, the series follows a group of contestants facing various cooking challenges in order to win the title of MasterChef and a cash prize.

The first season premiered on 21 March 2011 on Nova TV, and it was hosted by Jasna Nanut. The series went on a hiatus after the third season was aired in 2015. In 2021, the series returned with its fourth season and has since been on air regularly as a part of Nova TV's fall schedule. The seventh season premiered in September 2024.

== Format ==
Each season begins with auditions during which aspiring finalists have to impress the judges by preparing a meal in front of them. After the finalists are selected by the jury, they face a vast array of culinary challenges. As the contestants are eliminated, the winner is selected among the remaining Top Two contestants at the finale.

=== Judges ===
The judges in the first season were Tomislav Gretić, a well-known Croatian chef; Mate Janković, one of the youngest Croatian chefs; and Radovan Marčić, a director and a writer.

For the 2021 reboot of the series, a brand new panel of judges was introduced: Damir Tomljanović, Melkior Bašić and Stjepan Vukadin were the main judges for the fourth, fifth and sixth season. Tomljanović and Bašić were replaced with Goran Kočiš and Mario Mihelj for the seventh season.

Judges on MasterChef Croatia
Judge	Season								
Judge	1	2	3	4	5	6	7	8	9
Mate Janković	Main	Main	Main						
Radovan Marčić	Main	Main	Main						
Tomislav Gretić	Main								
Dino Galvagno		Main	Main						
Andrej Barbieri			Main						
Damir Tomljanović				Main	Main	Main			
Melkior Bašić				Main	Main	Main			
Stjepan Vukadin				Main	Main	Main	Main	Main	Main
Goran Kočiš							Main	Main	Main
Mario Mihelj							Main	Main	Main

== Series overview ==
Season	Finalists	Episodes	Originally released		Winner	Runner-up(s)
Season	Finalists	Episodes	First released	Last released	Winner	Runner-up(s)
1	20	61	21 March 2011	17 June 2011	Šime Sušić	Srđana Jevtić
2	20	65	24 September 2012	14 December 2012	Nikola Lesar	Marko Palfi
3	16	23	20 March 2015	5 June 2015	Iva Pehar	Ante Marić
4	19	60	20 September 2021	30 December 2021	Ivan Temšić	Gorana Milaković
5	21	60	19 September 2022	29 December 2022	Maja Šabić	Lora Cepetić
6	24	61	4 September 2023	29 December 2023	Luka Veić	Sarah Mikulec
7	23	60	15 September 2024	30 December 2024	Ante Vukadin	Sanja Cukon
8	24	59	15 September 2025	30 December 2025	Endrina Muqaj	Otto Grundmann
9	TBA	TBA	14 September 2026	2026	TBA	TBA

=== Season 1 (2011) ===
The filming of the first season began in February 2011; over 1500 applicants auditioned to participate in it. The series premiered on 21 March 2011.

The finalists in order of elimination were Robert Predrag Žmire, Matija Nikolić, Vedran Beg, Davor Šreng, Željana Ančić, Ljubo Matulin, Bojan Končar, Ana Kovačević Pilepić, Marko Gajski, Nastasja Fišter, Ivan Vučković, Mario Bobanović, Ivana Đokić, Tea Đukić, Vesna Matulić, Igor Zdenjak, Ivanko Rebič, and Tomislav Rusakć. The season was won by Šime Sušić.

=== Season 2 (2012) ===
The second season was won by Nikola Lesar.

=== Season 3 (2015) ===
The third season premiered on 20 March 2015. The finalists in order of elimination were Ratko Iveković, Valerio Baranović, Robert Budimir Bekan, Oskar Svržnjak, Danijel Živković, Dina Lončar, Dario Žmikić, Mišel Matulin, Ivana Vujina Jović, Elena Jurić, Emilija Marinović, and Martina Županić. The season was won by Iva Pehar.

=== Season 4 (2021) ===
In late 2020, Nova TV confirmed that the series is returning after a hiatus. The auditions began in June 2021, and it was confirmed that the judging panel would consist of Melkior Bašić, Damir Tomljanović, and Stjepan Vukadin.

The fourth season premiered on 20 September 2021. The finalists in order of elimination were Marija Gregurić, Frano Kekez, Igor Ivanović, Ana Marija Kutleša, Ema Baniček, Zvijezdana Posavec, Tihomir Bježančević, Tomislav Marković, Filip Pleteš, Željka Bleuš, Klavdija Zubović, Karmen Jurčić, Maja Mandić, Marko Krznarić, Roko Kulušić - Neral, Vanja Agić, and Ana Antunović. The winner was Ivan Temšić.

=== Season 5 (2022) ===
The finalists in order of elimination were Emina Bajramović, Leo Jurešić, Jelica Boto, Lucija Kerečin, Ivica Višić, Maja Jalšovec, Lucija Davidović, Luka Marin, Mevlija Delić, Marko Kolak, Nikola Kotur, Luka Piasevoli, Vesna Slavica, Matea Alduk, Andrea Dević, Tihomir Krklec, Ivana Ivić, Anita Vuković, and Wannapa Ponyon. The season was won by Maja Šabić.

=== Season 6 (2023) ===
The sixth season ran from 4 September to 29 December 2023, concluding after 61 episodes. The winner was Luka Veić.

=== Season 7 (2024) ===
Auditions for the seventh season opened in March 2024. For the first time since the fourth season, the judging panel was revamped: Damir Tomljanović and Melkior Bašić were replaced with Goran Kočiš and Mario Mihelj; Stjepan Vukadin, however, remained on the panel.

The season premiered on 15 September and concluded on 30 December 2024 after 60 episodes. The winner was Ante Vukadin.

=== Season 8 (2025) ===
Applications for the eighth season began in October 2024. It premiered on 15 September 2025 with Mario Mihelj, Stjepan Vukadin and Goran Kočiš returning as the judges. The season was won by Endrina Muqaj.

=== Season 9 (2026) ===
The ninth season was confirmed in January 2026. The trailer for the season was released on 11 August 2026. On 4 September 2026, a premiere date of 14 September 2024 was announced.
