= RTL (Croatian TV channel) =

- Country: Croatia
- Headquarters: Zagreb

Programming
- Picture format: 1080i HDTV

Ownership
- Owner: RTL Hrvatska (CME)
- Sister channels: RTL 2; RTL Kockica; RTL Living; RTL Crime; RTL Passion; RTL Adria; RTL Croatia World

History
- Launched: 30 April 2004; 22 years ago

Links
- Website: www.rtl.hr

Availability

Terrestrial
- OiV: MUX M1

Streaming media
- Affiliated Streaming Service: Voyo

RTL (previously known as RTL Televizija) is a Croatian free-to-air television network founded on 30 April 2004. It was owned by the RTL Group from 2004 to 2022. Since 1 June 2022, it is owned by the CME Group. It is the second commercial television network in Croatia that has a national concession, following Nova TV.

== History ==
In 2003, the Croatian government opted to privatize the HRT 3 frequency. In June 2003, five companies were interested: RTL Group, News Corporation, SBS Broadcasting, HMTM and CME. A final decision was expected by 1 October.

RTL began broadcasting on 30 April 2004 at 18:45 CET. The first broadcast of RTL's news program, RTL Vijesti, was hosted that day by Tomislav Jelinčić and Tanja Tomić. At the time of its launch, RTL was operated from one office which contained only 10 computers and 10 employees. Throughout the years, the network grew into a multi-medial platform with over 300 employees.

On 15 May 2014, RTL Group announced that Henning Tewes, managing director of news provider Enex, would be appointed chief executive officer (CEO) of RTL Hrvatska from 1 July 2014. Tewes succeeded Johannes Züll, who left the RTL Group to become president and CEO of Studio Hamburg. Following a proposal from Tewes, Ivan Lovreček, former editor-in-chief and member of the executive board of RTL Hrvatska, was promoted to deputy CEO of the company on 1 July 2014.

The blocks got a three-dimensional design on 16 September 2015. Mein RTL would be used in some idents.

On 12 November 2019, as part of a nationwide transition to the DVB-T2 broadcast standard among all Croatian broadcasters, the channel including with RTL 2, RTL Kockica, RTL Passion, RTL Living, and RTL Crime launched their HD feeds. A month later, on 20 December 2019, RTL debuted a new flat logo and graphics package that replaced the Phoenica font (used by RTL's parent channel in its on-air appearance) with the well-known FF DIN font. At this point, its slogan was "Više od Televizije" (English: More than Television).

On 15 September 2021, the German version of RTL was relaunched with a new multi-colored logo. It was confirmed that the new logo would debut in Croatia sometime in the near future, however this has not happened as of 2024.

On 14 February 2022, it was announced that RTL Group reached an agreement with Central European Media Enterprises for the sale of RTL Hrvatska. On 1 June 2022, the transaction of RTL Hrvatska to CME had been completed.

The channel celebrated 20 years of existence through April and May 2024, featuring new ident bumpers with taglines such as "20 years of originality", "20 years ahead of everyone" and "20 years of changing lives." The bumpers featured RTL's most prominent television personalities, such as the news' and other program's hosts. A special two-part series titled 20 godina zajedno (transl. 20 Years Together) aired on 4 and 5 May. Hosted by Antonija Blaće, the special series looked back on the most memorable moments in RTL's history.

On 28 April 2025, RTL announced that its teletext service would be shut down on 1 May of the same year.

== Programming ==
=== Original programming ===
Along with HRT and Nova TV, RTL is one of the three networks that air the largest amount of original television programming in Croatia. In recent years, the channel usually slots original series during the week in the evening, from around 17:00 CET, with the network's major shows airing in the prime time (20:15 to 22:00 CET). Earlier parts of the day are usually reserved for acquired programming and for re-runs of the shows from the previous day.

==== News programming ====
RTL broadcasts its own news program daily. Currently, the main news program titled RTL Danas (transl. RTL Today) airs its short news program at 16:30 CET every day excluding Friday, followed by the main news program airing daily from 19:00 to 20:15 CET. RTL Danas, which was previously known as RTL Vijesti (transl. RTL News), covers the most prominent political, cultural and other news of the day that are relevant in Croatia and in the world.

As of April 2015, a 30-minute late-night news program titled RTL Direkt airs Monday to Thursday, usually around 22:15 CET. Although Direkt mostly recaps political and other events featured in RTL Danas, it also focuses on covering popular culture, an example being a special episode aired 13 May 2024 which was dedicated to the review of the 2024 Eurovision Song Contest. Direkt usually features guests, varying from political persons, celebrities, experts in certain fields and other notable people. Its current host is Mojmira Pastorčić, who replaced Zoran Šprajc in 2022.

==== Scripted series ====
RTL is known for Zabranjena ljubav, the first Croatian soap opera. It premiered in 2004 and aired over 800 episodes. RTL also aired various original drama and comedy series through the years.

- Zabranjena ljubav (2004–2011)
- Bibin svijet (2006–2011)
- Sudnica (2006)
- Krim Tim 2 (2007)
- Ne daj se, Nina (2007–2008)
- Moja 3 zida (2009)
- Instruktor (2010)
- Krv nije voda (2011–2022)
- Ruža vjetrova (2011–2013)
- Tajne (2013–2014)
- Vatre ivanjske (2014–2015)
- Horvatovi (2015–2016)
- Prava žena (2016–2017)
- Dragi susjedi (2018)
- Pogrešan čovjek (2018–2019)
- Blago nama (2020–2022)
- San snova (2023–2024)
- Sjene prošlosti (2024–2025)
- Divlje pčele (2025–2026)
- Specijalisti Zagreb (2026)

==== Reality series ====
A large chunk of RTL's original programming consists of reality series, which are mostly Croatian adaptations of foreign reality show formats. In September 2004, RTL began airing Big Brother, its first reality series. The finale of the first season reached a record audience of 1.8 million viewers. The series went on to air seven seasons, concluding in May 2018.

The channel aired various dating reality series, the first being Scrolovka in 2004. Ljubav je na selu (transl. Love is at the Countryside), a Croatian iteration of Farmer Wants a Wife, premiered in September 2008, and is one of the longest-running Croatian reality series, having entered its seventeenth season in May 2024. RTL also aired Croatian iterations of other popular dating series such as Brak na prvu (Married at First Sight) and Gospodin Savršeni (The Bachelor).

Cooking and food-related reality series are also a part of RTL's staple programming. Večera za 5 (transl. Dinner for Five, based on Come Dine with Me), has been on air since 2007. The series was re-branded as Večera za 5 na selu (transl. Dinner for Five at the Countryside) from 2019 to 2022 until returning to its original title in 2023. It is the longest-running Croatian culinary series. In 2013, RTL aired an original cooking reality series format titled Tri, dva jedan - peci! (transl. Three, two, one - bake!), and later its spin-off Tri, dva jedan - kuhaj! (transl. Three, two, one - cook!), which premiered in 2014. Croatian versions of Ramsay's Kitchen Nightmares and Hell's Kitchen were also aired by the channel.

A part of the channel's programming has also been dedicated to talent-show singing reality series. Hrvatska traži zvijezdu (transl. Croatia's Star Search), was the second Croatian iteration of Idol, following Nova TV's 2004 Hrvatski Idol. It aired three seasons from 2009 to 2011. A reboot of the series titled Superstar premiered on RTL in September 2023.

Legend
†	Currently airing series
#	Series no longer in production
‡	Upcoming season or series announced
⁂	Status of series unknown

Name	Based on	Host(s)	No. of seasons	Premiere
Big Brother#	Big Brother	Daria Knez (s. 1); Antonija Blaće (s. 2–6, 8); Marijana Batinić (s. 7)	7	18 September 2004
Mjenjačnica#	Original format	Robert Knjaz	2	12 January 2005
Dvornikovi#	The Osbournes	–	2	4 January 2006
Mijenjam ženu#	Wife Swap	–	Unknown	2006
Koledžicom po svijetu#	Original format	Robert Knjaz	2	17 March 2007
Večera za 5†	Come Dine With Me	–	17	14 May 2007
Hrvatski Top Model#	America's Next Top Model	Tatjana Jurić (s. 1); Vanja Rupena (s. 2)	2	3 March 2008
Punom parom#	Original format	–	1	2008
Ljubav je na selu⁂	Farmer Wants a Wife	Former: Lorena Nosić (s. 1–2); Marijana Batinić (s. 3–12); Current: Anita Martinović (s. 13–)	17	4 September 2008
Hrvatska traži zvijezdu#	Idol	Antonija Blaće	3	17 April 2009
Najveći hrvatski misterij#	Original format	Robert Knjaz	1	8 September 2009
Jezikova juha#	Ramsay's Kitchen Nightmares	Stéphan Macch (s. 1–3); David Skoko (s. 4)	4	15 October 2009
Survivor: Kostarika#	Survivor	Marijana Batinić	1	12 March 2012
Tri, dva, jedan – peci!#	Original format	Antonija Blaće	4	9 December 2013
Tri, dva, jedan – kuhaj!#	Original format	Antonija Blaće (s. 1); Doris Pinčić Rogoznica (s. 2–7); Domagoj Jakopović (s. 7–8); Marijana Batinić (s. 9)	9	24 March 2014
Shopping kraljica#	Shopping Monsters	Borut Mihalić (s. 1–2); Robert Sever (s. 3)	3	16 March 2015
Zvjezdice#	Pinkove Zvezdice	Doris Pinčić (s. 1); Nives Čanović (s. 2–3)	3	12 September 2015
Život na vagi⁂	The Biggest Loser	Marijana Batinić (s. 1–4, 6–7); Sanja Žuljević (s. 5); Antonija Blaće (s. 9)	9	27 March 2017
RTL Zvijezde#	Pinkove Zvezde	Antonija Blaće (s. 1, 3); Petra Dugandžić (s. 2)	3	8 May 2017
Gospodin Savršeni⁂	The Bachelor	Antonija Blaće (s. 1–4); Marko Vargek (s. 5)	5	19 November 2018
Superpar#	Power Couple	Enis Bešlagić	4	23 March 2019
Brak na prvu⁂	Married at First Sight	–	5	16 March 2020
Masked Singer#	Masked Singer	Antonija Blaće (s. 1); Nikolina Pišek (s. 2)	2	2 April 2022
Pet spojeva tjedno#	Five Guys a Week	–	1	21 November 2022
Superstar#	Idol	Antonija Blaće	2	23 September 2023
Hell's Kitchen Hrvatska#	Hell's Kitchen	Tomislav Gretić	1	31 January 2024
Farma#	The Farm	Nikolina Pišek	1 (Note: Farma previously ran for 7 seasons on Nova TV, from 2008 to 2020.)	26 May 2025 (Note: Premiered on Voyo one week earlier, on 19 May 2025.)
Igra chefova⁂	Game of Chef	Marijana Batinić	1	13 April 2026
Asia Express†	Peking Express	Antonija Blaće; Ante Travizi	1	8 September 2026

==== Game show series ====
- Veto (2004, based on Das Quiz mit Jörg Pilawa)
- Fear Factor (2006–2007, based on Fear Factor)
- Kunolovac (2007)
- Pobjedi Šolu (2009, based on Schlag den Raab)
- Tog se nitko nije sjetio! (2013, based on Pointless)
- Tko će ga znati? (2013)
- Pet na Pet (2014–2018, based on Family Feud)
- Kolo sreće (2015–2020, based on The Wheel of Fortune)
- Direktor svemira (2021–2026, based on Taskmaster)
- Ma lažeš! (2021)
- Dođi, pogodi, osvoji (2021–, based on The Price Is Right)
- Tko bi rekao? (2026, based on Wer weiß denn sowas?)

==== Other notable programming ====
- Sanja (2004, a talk-show hosted by Sanja Doležal)
- Exkluziv Tabloid (2004, a lifestyle and celebrity gossip series with spin-offs such as Exkluziv Fashion and Exkluziv Vikend)
- Galileo (2011–2015, an educational series)
- Studio 45 (2011–2014, a talk-show)
- InDizajn s Mirajnom Mikulec (2012–, an interior design series)
- Ludi bar (2019, a talk-show)
- Gradi(ona) (2021–, an exterior and interior design series)
- Stanje nacije (2022–, a political satire series hosted by Zoran Šprajc)
- Dosje Jarak (2023–, a true-crime documentary)

=== Acquired programming ===
The channel mostly acquires English-language programming, as well as a smaller chunk of regional (Serbian or Slovene) programming. Throughout late 2000s and early 2010s, RTL aired popular American sitcoms such as Family Matters (1989–1998), Full House (1987–1994), How I Met Your Mother (2005–2014), Malcolm in the Middle (2000–2005), Step by Step (1991–1997), and The Nanny (1993–1998). During this period, Spanish-language telenovelas were also popular on the channel, including Dame Chocolate (2007) and El Rostro de Analía (2008–2009), until Turkish series such as Muhteşem Yüzyıl (2011–2014) took over in the early 2010s. Most of such programs were moved to RTL 2 after its launch in 2011, and later to RTL Passion. Serbian series that aired on the channel include Južni vetar (2022) and Toma (2023–2024).

Before launching RTL Kockica in 2014, the channel also focused on programming for children, airing animated series every day in the morning. Croatian dubs of series such as Ben 10 (2005–2008), Dexter's Laboratory (1995–2003), PopPixie (2011), Strawberry Shortcake (2003), and Trollz (2005) premiered on RTL. The Croatian dub of SpongeBob SquarePants (2000–) also originally premiered RTL, before the series was moved to Nickelodeon with its Croatian-language audio launch in 2011. The channel occasionally featured a programming block titled Disney dan (transl. Disney Day), airing popular Disney movies such as Finding Nemo (2003) and Frozen (2013).

=== Sports ===
Throughout all of its daily news programs, RTL Televizija has broadcast daily sports news throughout all of its daily news programs. The Croatian national football team used to broadcast its away matches there between 2004 and 2007. Since 2008, HRT has been broadcasting these matches once again.

RTL Televizija occasionally also broadcast boxing bouts and the highlights of the Red Bull Air Race events. They also bought the TV rights for all the matches of the 2009 World Men's Handball Championship, which was held in Croatia. This proved to be a big hit to Croatia's public broadcaster HRT, who even threatened to take legal action against RTL after they refused to sell them the rights to broadcast the match highlights during their news programs.

== Sister channels ==
Channel	Launch	Type	Description	Ref.
RTL 2	2 January 2011	Free-to-air	Entertainment channel dedicated to re-runs of RTL flagship channel's original programming and various acquired programming, such as sitcoms.	
RTL Kockica	11 January 2014	Free-to-air	Children's programming.	
RTL Crime	12 March 2015	Cable	Crime television series.	
RTL Living	12 March 2015	Cable	Lifestyle television series. The channel also re-runs RTL's news programming.	
RTL Passion	12 March 2015	Cable	Telenovelas, soap operas, drama and romance television series.	
RTL Croatia World	11 July 2016	Cable	RTL's news and entertainment programming for audiences outside of Croatia.	
RTL Adria	24 February 2020	Cable	Entertainment channel.	

== Streaming ==
RTL launched its streaming service RTL Play on 12 January 2018. It was a free ad-supported service that offered access to RTL's programming, as well as a livestream of RTL's channels. A paid Play Premium option was also available; it featured access to locked content and programming exclusive to the service, such as new episodes of the scripted drama series Krv nije voda.

In July 2023, RTL announced that RTL Play was getting replaced with Voyo, a subscription-based video on demand over-the-top service. Voyo launched on 27 August, offering subscribers an access to new episodes of RTL's both original and acquired television series 24 hours prior to their television broadcast. The service also focuses on offering exclusive acquired programming that has not been broadcast on RTL.

== Viewership ==
=== Audience and advertising share ===
Year	2004	2005	2006	2007	2008	2009	2010	2011	2012	2013	2014	2015	2016	2017	2018
Audience share	7.3%	6.2%	5.9%	5.3%	5.1%	4.4%	4.2%	4.3%	3.2%	4.2%	4.4%	2.2%	2.2%	6.3%	7.3%
Audience share (target 18–49)	29.5%	28.6%	28.6%	26.4%	26.2%	26.1%	26.4%	13.4%	Unknown						
Advertising share	16.3%	38.4%	42.9%	Unknown											
