= Zvijezde pjevaju =

- The title card for the series
- Genre: Reality television
- Based on: Just the Two of Us by BBC Worldwide
- Presented by: Barbara Kolar; Duško Ćurlić
- Judges: Danijela Martinović; Marko Tolja; Mario Lipovšek Battifiaca
- Country of origin: Croatia
- No. of seasons: 13
- No. of episodes: 97 (+1 special)

Production
- Production company: Hrvatska radiotelevizija

Original release
- Network: HRT 1
- Release: 7 April 2007 – 4 May 2024

Zvijezde pjevaju (English: The Stars Sing) is a Croatian singing competition reality television series based on the British format of Just the Two of Us. The series sees non-singer celebrities paired up with professional singers in order to compete for the win in an elimination-based format.

The series debuted on 7 April 2007 on HRT 1. Thirteen seasons and one New Year's Eve special have been broadcast so far.

== Format ==
The show features a number of celebrities paired up with professional singers. The stars perform duets with their partners, and in each episode, one couple is eliminated.

After each performance, the jury gives comments on the performance and scores from 1 to 10. The judges' scores are added to the audience votes and the couple with the lowest score is eliminated.

== Cast ==
=== Professional singers ===
Color key

Won the season
Placed second in the season
Placed third in the season
Placed last in the season
Withdrew

Mentor	Season												
Mentor	1	2	3	4	5	6	7	8	9	10	11	12	13
Jacques Houdek	Lamija Alečković	Mila Elegović		Ana Vilenica									
Maja Blagdan	Robert Zuber	Željko Tomac		Željko Pervan		Boris Mirković							
Ivana Husar Mlinac	Luka Bulić			Boris Mirković		Nikša Kušelj							
Boris Novković	Iva Visković												
Jelena Radan	Igor Mešin	Pjer Žardin			Zlatan Zuhrić			Borko Perić					
Goran Karan	Marija Cvitanović												
Ivana Banfić	Stjepan Božić												
Petar Grašo	Bojana Gregorić												
Ivana Kindl		Nikša Kušelj	Duško Modrinić		Mario Petreković	Goran Navojec		Krešimir Sučević Međeral	Damir Smrtić	Marina Orsag	Goran Grgić	Boris Banović	Igor Barberić
Đani Stipaničev		Karmela Vukov-Colić	Katja Kušec	Mare Milin									
Marija Husar Rimac		Goran Navojec	Mihovil Horvat		Robert Sever	Mario Petreković							
Giuliano		Marijana Batinić	Dolores Lambaša	Ines Bojanić	Melita Hrengek	Marija Borić							
Ervin Baučić		Marijana Mikulić	Tamara Despot		Marija Borić	Mila Elegović	Petra Dugandžić						
Natali Dizdar			Dražen Čuček	Viktor Drago									
Marko Tolja			Kristina Krepela	Tamara Loos	Nataša Janjić		Tina Katanić						
Zorica Kondža			Davor Dretar Drele										
Žanamari Lalić				Davor Meštrović				Frano Ridjan					
Alen Nižetić					Mirta Šurjak	Tamara Loos							
Renata Sabljak					Dušan Bućan		Miran Kurspahić						
Maja Vučić							Ivica Pucar						
Emilija Kokić							Robert Kurbaša						
Vlado Kalember							Ana Rucner		Kristina Klemenčić Novinc				
Danijela Martinović							Mirko Fodor						
Saša Lozar							Lana Barić						
Ricardo Luque							Martina Validžić						
Dino Jelusić								Tara Thaller					
Bojan Jambrošić								Ashley Colburn	Dora Fišter		Matea Šeparović	Jelena Perčin	Lejla Filipović
Pero Galić								Katarina Strahinić					
Goran Bošković								Ella Dvornik		Areta Ćurković	Ivana Šojat		Mihovil Španja
Antonia Matković Šerić								Krešimir Macan			Mario Valentić		
Marko Kutlić									Arija Rizvić				
Lara Antić Prskalo									Ivan Šarić	Antun Ponoš	Mila Horvat		Tara Rosandić
Gina Damjanović									Marko Petrić	Marko Braić		Davor Jurkotić	
Lea Mijatović									Boris Svrtan				
Sandi Cenov									Josipa Kusić				
Mario Lipovšek Battifiaca										Robert Ferlin			
Stjepan Lach										Maja Ciglenečki			
Ivo Amulić										Iva Jerković			
Lu Jakelić										Mario Kovač			
Mia Negovetić											Marco Cuccurin		
Zoran Prodanović Prlja											Jelena Miholjević		
Alen Đuras											Domagoj Janković	Ana Radišić	Ivana Mišerić
Ivanka Mazurkijević												Lucija Šerbedžija	
Jelena Žnidarić Zsa Zsa												Ivan Pažanin	
Vjeko Ključarić												Lovro Juraga	Jelena Pajić
Ivan Penezić												Andrea Andrassy	
Neda Parmać													Nicolas Quesnoit
Dino Petrić													Dea Presećki

== Series overview ==
Season	Episodes	Originally released		Winners
Season	Episodes	First released	Last released	Winners
1	8	7 April 2007	3 June 2007	Lamija Alečković & Jacques Houdek
2	8	8 March 2008	26 April 2008	Nikša Kušelj & Ivana Kindl
3	8	14 March 2009	2 May 2009	Dražen Čuček & Natali Dizdar
4	8	13 March 2010	1 May 2010	Ana Vilenica & Jacques Houdek
5	8	19 March 2011	7 May 2011	Marija Borić & Ervin Baučić
6	6	7 January 2012	11 February 2012	Goran Navojec & Ivana Kindl
7	8	15 March 2014	3 May 2014	Tina Katanić & Marko Tolja
8	8	2 March 2019	20 April 2019	Tara Thaller & Dino Jelusick
9	8	3 October 2020	21 November 2020	Arija Rizvić & Marko Kutlić
10	7	19 March 2022	7 May 2022	Robert Ferlin & Mario Lipovšek Battifiaca
11	7	8 October 2022	19 November 2022	Marco Cuccurin & Mia Negovetić
12	7	25 March 2023	6 May 2023	Lovro Juraga & Vjeko Ključarić
New Year's Eve Special		31 December 2023		Krešimir Sučević Međeral & Ivana Kindl Domagoj Janković & Alen Đuras
13	6	30 March 2024	4 May 2024	Igor Barberić & Ivana Kindl

=== Season 1 (2007) ===
The series debuted on 7 April 2007 on HRT 1. The first season was won by Lamija Alečković and her professional partner Jacques Houdek.

=== Season 2 (2008) ===
The second season premiered on 8 March 2008.

=== Season 3 (2009) ===
The third season premiered on 14 March 2009.

=== Season 4 (2010) ===
The fourth season premiered on 13 March 2010.

=== Season 5 (2011) ===
The fifth season premiered on 19 March 2011.

=== Season 6 (2012) ===
The sixth season premiered on 7 January 2012.

=== Season 7 (2014) ===
The seventh season premiered on 15 March 2014.

=== Season 8 (2019) ===
After a five year hiatus, the series returned to HRT 1 on 2 March 2019 with its eighth season.

=== Season 9 (2020) ===
The ninth season premiered on 3 October 2020.

=== Season 10 (2022) ===
The tenth season premiered on 19 March 2022.

=== Season 11 (2022) ===
The eleventh season premiered on 8 October 2022.

=== Season 12 (2023) ===
The twelfth season premiered on 25 March 2023.

=== New Year's Eve Special (2023) ===
A New Year's Eve Special (Croatian: Novogodišnji specijal), consisting of one episode, was broadcast on 31 December 2023.

=== Season 13 (2024) ===
The thirteenth season premiered on 30 March 2024. It was won by Igor Barberić and his professional partner Ivana Kindl.
