= Zvijezde pjevaju season 3 =

Zvijezde pjevaju
- Season 3
- Hosted by: Duško Čurlić; Barbara Kolar
- Judges: Husein Hasanefendić; Rajko Dujmić; Ksenija Erker
- Celebrity winner: Dražen Čuček
- Professional winner: Natali Dizdar
- No. of episodes: 8

Release
- Original network: HRT 1
- Original release: 14 March – 2 May 2009

The third season of Zvijezde pjevaju ran from 14 March to 2 May 2009 on HRT 1.

== Contestants ==
Cast of Zvijezde pjevaju season 3
Celebrity	Notability	Professional partner	Result
Dražen Čuček	Actor	Natali Dizdar	Winners
Duško Modrinić	Actor	Ivana Kindl	Runners-up
Katja Kušec	Journalist	Đani Stipaničev	Eliminated 6th
Kristina Krepela	Actress	Marko Tolja	Eliminated 5th
Davor Dretar Drele	Comedian	Zorica Kondža	Eliminated 4th
Dolores Lambaša	Actress	Giuliano	Eliminated 3rd
Mihovil Horvat	Journalist	Marija Husar	Eliminated 2nd
Tamara Despot	Dancer	Ervin Baučić	Eliminated 1st

== Scoring chart ==
Celebrity	Professional partner	Week							
Celebrity	Professional partner	1	2	3	4	5	6	7 (SF)	8 (F)
Dražen Čuček	Natali Dizdar	23	30	32	33	36	39 + 33 = 72	40 + 37 = 77	40 + 40 + 40 = 120
Duško Modrinić	Ivana Kindl	31	33	33	31	37	36 + 37 = 73	40 + 39 = 79	40 + 40 + 40 = 120
Katja Kušec	Đani Stipaničev	20	21	22	22	23	21 + 26 = 47	30 + 30 = 60	
Kristina Krepela	Marko Tolja	26	31	27	33	29	30 + 35 = 65		
Davor Dretar Drele	Zorica Kondža	27	28	31	30	34			
Dolores Lambaša	Giuliano	27	31	31	32				
Mihovil Horvat	Marija Husar	23	23	27					
Tamara Despot	Ervin Baučić	24	27						

== Episodes ==
No. overall	No. in season	Title	Original release date
17	1	"Episode 1"	14 March 2009
Performances: Kristina & Marko: "Blago onom tko te ima" by Tony Cetinski; Mihovil & Marija: "Još ne znam kud s tobom" by Hari Rončević; Dolores & Giuliano: "Sladoled" by Prljavo kazalište; Duško & Ivana: "Voli me još ovu noć" by Denis & Denis; Drele & Zorica: "Predaj se srce" by Indexi; Tamara & Ervin: "Priznaj mi" by Big Blue; Dražen & Natali: "Teardrops" by Womack i Womack; Katja & Đani: "Ruža crvena" by Agrameri
18	2	"Episode 2"	21 March 2009
Performances: Tamara & Ervin: "Traveling Band" by Creedence Clearwater Revival; Drele & Zorica: "I Can't Stop Loving You" by Ray Charles; Kristina & Marko: "Cheek to Cheek" by Frank Sinatra; Katja & Đani: "Crying Time" by Ray Charles & Barbra Streisand; Dražen & Natali: "The Way You Look Tonight" by Frank Sinatra; Mihovil & Marija: "Amazing Grace" by Elvis Presley; Dolores & Giuliano: "When the Saints Go Marching In" by Louis Armstrong; Duško & Ivana: "Signed, Sealed i Delivered" by Stevie Wonder; Marija Husar & Marko Tolja: "Endless Love" by Diana Ross & Lionel Richie
19	3	"Episode 3"	28 March 2009
Performances: Dražen & Natali: "Jackson" by June Carter & Johnny Cash; Duško & Ivana: "Candy" by Iggy Pop & Kate Pierson; Katja & Đani: "Osmjeh" by Drago Mlinarec; Dolores & Giuliano: "Ugasi me" by Parni valjak; Kristina & Marko: "Let Your Love Flow" by Bellamy Brothers; Mihovil & Marija: "Sve je lako kad si mlad" by Prljavo kazalište; Drele & Zorica: "Living Next Door to Alice" by Smokie; Prateći vokali emisije: "True Colors" by Cyndi Lauper
20	4	"Episode 4"	4 April 2009
Performances: Katja & Đani: "Mramor, kamen i željezo" by VIS Roboti; Drele & Zorica: "I've Had The Time Of My Life" by Bill Medley & Jennifer Warnes; Dražen & Natali: "Can't Buy Me Love" by The Beatles; Duško & Ivana: "Jailhouse Rock" by Elvis Presley; Kristina & Marko: "Singin' In The Rain" by Gene Kelly; Dolores & Giuliano: "Johnny B. Goode" by Chuck Berry; Ivana Kindl & Ervin Baučić: "More Than Words" by Extreme
21	5	"Episode 5"	11 April 2009
Performances: Duško & Ivana: "Don't Worry Be Happy" by Bobby McFerrin; Kristina & Marko: "Can't Help Falling in Love" by Elvis Presley; Drele & Zorica: "Honky Tonk Women" by Rolling Stones; Katja & Đani: "Danas sam luda" by Josipa Lisac; Dražen & Natali: "A šta da radim" by Azra; Zorica Kondža & Giuliano: "Samo ti" by Đorđi Peruzović & Snežana Naumovska
22	6	"Episode 6"	18 April 2009
Performances: Kristina & Marko: "Killing Me Softly" by Roberta Flack and "Profesor Jakov" by Let 3; Katja & Đani: "Treba imat dušu" by Atomsko sklonište and "Milioner" by Zvonko Špišić; Dražen & Natali: "Jednom kad noć" by Opća opasnost and "Mamma Mia" by ABBA; Duško & Ivana: "Budi samo moja" by Mirjana Bohanec & Relja Bašić and "Sjaj u tami" by Dorian Gray; Natali Dizdar & Marko Tolja: "I'll Be There" by Jackson 5
23	7	"Episode 7"	25 April 2009
Performances: Dražen & Natali: "Chain Of Fools" by Aretha Franklin and "Zamijenit ću te gorim" by Natali Dizdar; Duško & Ivana: "On The Road Again" by Willie Nelson and "Kao kazna božija" by Ivana Kindl & Jacques Houdek; Katja & Đani: "Edelweiss" by Christopher Plummer & Julie Andrews and "More, ti suzo plava" by Đani Stipaničev; Ivana Husar Mlinac & Robert Zuber: "Caruso" by Lucio Dalla; Eliminated: Katja Kušec & Đani Stipaničev
24	8	"Episode 8"	2 May 2009
Performances: Duško & Ivana: "Voli me još ovu noć" by Denis & Denis, "Candy" by Iggy Pop & Kate Pierson, and "Tvoja ljubav vodi me" by The Bastardz; Dražen & Natali: "Jednom kad noć" by Opća opasnost, "A šta da radim" by Azra, and "Loše vino" by Bijelo dugme; Extra performances: Eliminated contestants: "Ljubavna" by Parni valjak; Finalists: "Show Must Go On" by Queen; Lamija Alečković & Nikša Kušelj: "Summer Wine" by Nancy Sinatra; Winners of Zvijezde pjevaju Season Three: Dražen Čuček & Natali Dizdar
