= Masked Singer (Croatian TV series) =

Croatian television programme

- Genre: Singing competition
- Based on: King of Mask Singer by Wonwoo Park
- Presented by: Antonija Blaće (s. 1); Nikolina Pišek (s. 2)
- Country of origin: Croatia
- Original language: Croatian
- No. of seasons: 2
- No. of episodes: 18

Original release
- Network: RTL
- Release: 2 April 2022 – 29 April 2023

Related
- Masked Singer

Masked Singer is a Croatian singing reality television series based on the South Korean television series King of Mask Singer. The series follows a group of celebrities performing under masks, as a set of panelists and viewers attempt to guess the celebrity's identity based on clues given by the masks.

The series debuted with its first season on 2 April 2022 on RTL. The second season premiered on 11 March 2023.

== Production ==
RTL announced the series in March 2022. The masks for both seasons were created by the Croatian fashion designer Juraj Zigman.

=== Format ===
Each episode consist of group of celebrities performing songs under masks, with each of them revealing clues that point to their real identity. A group of panelists (also referred to as "the detectives") attempt to guess the mask's identity. Based on the vote of the audience, one masks leaves the competition each episode, with their identity being revealed post-elimination.

In the second seasons, the show was broadcast live, with viewers voting for their favorite masks via televote. The mask with the fewest votes would be eliminated.

=== Hosts and panelists ===
The first season was hosted by Antonija Blaće. The panelists were Borko Perić, Ida Prester, Enis Bešlagić, and Antonija Mandić.

The second season was hosted by Nikolina Pišek, whilst Blaće appeared as a panelist. She was joined by Borko Perić, Saša Lozar, and Nives Celzijus.

== Series overview ==
Season	Episodes	Originally released		Winner	Runner-up	Third place
Season	Episodes	First released	Last released	Winner	Runner-up	Third place
1	10	2 April 2022	4 June 2022	Zsa Zsa as "Meduza"	Vlado Šola as "Ajkula Drakula"	Emilija Kokić as "Dalmatinka"
2	8	11 March 2023	29 April 2023	Damir Kedžo as "Tovar"	Zoran Šprajc as "Medo"	Hiljson Mandela as "Čudnovište"

== Season 1 ==
=== Contestants ===
Stage Name	Celebrity	Occupation	Episode									
Stage Name	Celebrity	Occupation	1	2	3	4	5	6	7	8	9	10
Meduza (Jellyfish)	Zsa Zsa	Singer	WIN		WIN	WIN	WIN	WIN	RISK	RISK	WIN	WINNER
Ajkula Drakula (Shark Dracula)	Vlado Šola	Handball player		RISK	RISK	WIN	RISK	WIN	SAFE	WIN	RISK	RUNNER-UP
Dalmatinka (Dalmatian)	Emilija Kokić	Singer		WIN	WIN	RISK	RISK	WIN	WIN	WIN	WIN	THIRD
Torpedo	Dražen Turina	Singer	RISK		RISK	WIN	RISK	RISK	WIN	RISK	OUT	
Slatkač (Popsicle)	Filip Rudan	Singer	WIN		WIN	RISK	WIN	RISK	WIN	OUT		
Licitarsko Srce (Licitar Heart)	Marijana Batinić	Television host	WIN		WIN	RISK	WIN	WIN	OUT			
Tintilinić	Ella Dvornik	Influencer and singer	RISK		WIN	WIN	WIN	OUT				
Punjena Paprika (Stuffed Pepper)	Zlatan Zuhrić Zuhra	Actor and comedian		RISK	RISK	WIN	OUT					
Majka Zemlja (Mother Earth)	Sandra Bagarić	Opera singer and actress		WIN	RISK	OUT						
Kiborg (Cyborg)	Andrea Andrassy	Influencer and writer		WIN	OUT							
Galeb (Seagull)	Emir Hadžihafizbegović	Actor		OUT								
Baltazar (Balthazar)	Senna M	Retired singer	OUT									

Color key:

The mask won the duel.
The mask lost in a duel and was up for elimination, but was not eliminated.
The mask was safe from elimination.
The mask was eliminated and its identity was revealed.
The mask did not perform.

=== Episodes ===
==== Week 1 (April 2) ====
Performances on the first episode
#	Stage name	Song	Identity	Result
1	Popsicle	"Blinding Lights" by The Weeknd	WIN	
2	Balthazar	"Human" by Rag'n'Bone Man	RISK	
3	Licitar Heart	"Piece of My Heart" by Janis Joplin	WIN	
4	Torpedo	"Dirlija" by Crvena jabuka	RISK	
5	Jellyfish	"Like a Virgin" by Madonna	WIN	
6	Tintilinić	"Uptown Funk" by Mark Ronson feat. Bruno Mars	RISK	
Sing-Off
1	Balthazar	"Unchain My Heart" by Joe Cocker	Senna M	OUT
2	Tintilinić	"One Way or Another" by Blondie	undisclosed	SAFE
3	Torpedo	"Željo moja" by Doris Dragović	undisclosed	SAFE

==== Week 2 (April 9) ====
Performances on the second episode
#	Stage name	Song	Identity	Result
1	Mother Nature	"Ima jedan svijet" by Stijene	WIN	
2	Shark Dracula	"Čulo se buć bać" by Daleka obala	RISK	
3	Seagull	"Malo je, malo dana" by Halid Bešlić	RISK	
4	Cyborg	"Bad Guy" by Billie Eilish	WIN	
5	Stuffed Pepper	"Veseljko" by The Beat Fleet	RISK	
6	Dalmatian	"Dalmatinka" by Severina	WIN	
Sing-Off
1	Seagull	"Ti si pjesma moje duše" by Mišo Kovač	Emir Hadžihafizbegović	OUT
2	Shark Dracula	"Ja volim samo sebe" by Psihomodo Pop	undisclosed	SAFE
3	Stuffed Pepper	"Boombastic" by Shaggy	undisclosed	SAFE

==== Week 3 (April 16) ====
Performances on the third episode
#	Stage name	Song	Identity	Result
1	Dalmatian	"Conga" by Gloria Estefan	undisclosed	WIN
2	Torpedo	"Good Boy" by Minea	undisclosed	RISK
3	Stuffed Pepper	"Gangnam Style" by Psy	undisclosed	RISK
4	Tintilinić	"Fever" by Peggy Lee	undisclosed	WIN
5	Shark Dracula	"La Bamba" by Los Lobos	undisclosed	RISK
6	Jellyfish	"Someone Like Me" by Ylvis	undisclosed	WIN
7	Mother Nature	"Stare ljubavi" by Tereza Kesovija	undisclosed	RISK
8	Licitar Heart	"The Best" by Tina Turner	undisclosed	WIN
9	Cyborg	"Despacito" by Luis Fonsi feat. Daddy Yankee	Andrea Andrassy	OUT
10	Popsicle	"Sugar" by Robin Schulz	undisclosed	WIN

==== Week 4 (April 23) ====
Performances on the fourth episode
#	Stage name	Song	Identity	Result
1	Licitar Heart	"Rekao si" by Nina Badrić	undisclosed	RISK
2	Stuffed Pepper	"Volio BiH" by Dubioza Kolektiv	undisclosed	WIN
3	Popsicle	"Get Lucky" by Daft Punk feat. Pharrell Williams and Nile Rodgers	undisclosed	RISK
4	Torpedo	"Suada" by Plavi Orkestar	undisclosed	WIN
5	Shark Dracula	"Baby Shark" by Pinkfong	undisclosed	WIN
6	Dalmatian	"Who's That Girl?" by Eurythmics	undisclosed	RISK
7	Tintilinić	"Ugasi me" by Parni Valjak	undisclosed	WIN
8	Jellyfish	"Try" by Pink	undisclosed	WIN
9	Mother Nature	"Sunny Day" by Neno Belan	Sandra Bagarić	OUT

==== Week 5 (April 30) ====
Performances on the fifth episode
#	Stage name	Song	Identity	Result
1	Stuffed Pepper	"Rhythm Is a Dancer" by Snap!	Zlatan Zuhrić-Zuhra	OUT
2	Jellyfish	"Mercy" by Duffy	undisclosed	WIN
3	Licitar Heart	"Srce nije kamen" by Toše Proeski	undisclosed	WIN
4	Shark Dracula	"Stojin na kantunu" by Đavoli	undisclosed	RISK
5	Popsicle	"I Don't Want to Miss a Thing" by Aerosmith	undisclosed	WIN
6	Dalmatian	"Da Ya Think I'm Sexy?" by Rod Stewart	undisclosed	RISK
7	Tintilinić	"You Know I'm No Good" by Amy Winehouse	undisclosed	WIN
8	Torpedo	"Proljeće" by Luka Nižetić	undisclosed	RISK

==== Week 6 (May 7) ====
Performances on the sixth episode
#	Stage name	Song	Identity	Result
1	Tintilinić	"Dance with Somebody" by Mando Diao	Ella Dvornik	OUT
2	Licitar Heart	"Moja posljednja i prva ljubavi" by Tereza Kesovija	undisclosed	WIN
3	Torpedo	"Ja sam vlak" by Nina Badrić and Emilija Kokić	undisclosed	RISK
4	Jellyfish	"Dancing on My Own" by Robyn	undisclosed	WIN
5	Popsicle	"Leave the Door Open" by Silk Sonic	undisclosed	RISK
6	Dalmatian	"Rock Me" by Riva	undisclosed	WIN
7	Shark Dracula	"Dinamo ja volim" by Pips, Chips & Videoclips	undisclosed	WIN

==== Week 7 (May 14) ====
Performances on the seventh episode
#	Stage name	Song	Identity	Result
1	Torpedo	"Kiše jesenje" by Prljavo kazalište	WIN	
2	Jellyfish	"Come On Over Baby (All I Want Is You)" by Christina Aguilera	RISK	
3	Shark Dracula	"Ero s onoga svijeta" by Let 3	SAFE	
4	Dalmatian	"Take a Chance on Me" by ABBA	WIN	
5	Licitar Heart	"It's a Heartache" by Bonnie Tyler	RISK	
6	Popsicle	"Like a Stone" by Audioslave	WIN	
Sing-Off
1	Licitar Heart	"It Must Have Been Love" by Roxette	Marijana Batinić	OUT
2	Jellyfish	"Stay with Me" by Sam Smith	undisclosed	SAFE

==== Week 8 (May 21) ====
Performances on the eighth episode
#	Stage name	Song	Identity	Result
1	Shark Dracula	"Sve je lako kad si mlad" by Prljavo kazalište	WIN	
2	Torpedo	"Šumica" by I Bee	RISK	
3	Jellyfish	"Dodirni mi kolena" by Zana	RISK	
4	Popsicle	"Zašto praviš slona od mene" by Dino Dvornik	RISK	
5	Dalmatian	"Hajde da ludujemo" by Tajči	WIN	
Sing-Off
1	Torpedo	"Lepe ti je Zagorje zelene", a Croatian folk song	undisclosed	SAFE
2	Jellyfish	"Holding Out for a Hero" by Bonnie Tyler	undisclosed	SAFE
3	Popsicle	"Heaven" by Bryan Adams	Filip Rudan	OUT

==== Week 9 (May 28) ====
First performances on the ninth episode
#	Stage name	Song
1	Torpedo	"Pjevam danju, pjevam noću" by Zdravko Čolić
2	Jellyfish	"Fallin'" by Alicia Keys
3	Shark Dracula	"Malo nas je al' nas ima" by Boris Novković and Dino Dvornik
4	Dalmatian	"Like a Prayer" by Madonna

Group performance: "Mamma Mia" by ABBA

Second performances on the ninth episode
#	Stage name	Song	Identity	Result
1	Torpedo	"I've Got a Feeling" by Kasandra	Dražen Turina	OUT
2	Dalmatian	"I Want to Break Free" by Queen	undisclosed	WIN
3	Shark Dracula	"Moja prva ljubav" by Haustor	undisclosed	RISK
4	Jellyfish	"Vuprem oči" by Teta Liza and Cinkuši	undisclosed	WIN

==== Week 10 (June 4) ====
Group performance: "Takvi kao ti?" by Nina Badrić

First performances on the final episode
#	Stage name	Song
1	Dalmatian	"Can't Get You Out of My Head" by Kylie Minogue
2	Shark Dracula	"No sikiriki" by Edo Maajka
3	Jellyfish	"Gdje Dunav ljubi nebo" by Josipa Lisac

Second performances on the final episode
#	Stage name	Song	Identity	Result
1	Dalmatian	"Dalmatinac" by Mladen Grdović	Emilija Kokić	THIRD
2	Jellyfish	"It's Raining Men" by Geri Halliwell	undisclosed	SAFE
3	Shark Dracula	"Pjevajmo do zore" by Film	undisclosed	SAFE

Third performances on the final episode
#	Stage name	Song	Identity	Result
1	Shark Dracula	"Ruzinavi brod" by Daleka obala	Vlado Šola	RUNNER-UP
2	Jellyfish	"Hallelujah" by Leonard Cohen	Zsa Zsa	WINNER

== Season 2 ==
=== Contestants ===
The second season ran from 11 March to 29 April 2023, and was won by Damir Kedžo under the mask of "Tovar".

Stage Name	Celebrity	Occupation	Episode							
Stage Name	Celebrity	Occupation	1	2	3	4	5	6	7	8
Tovar (Donkey)	Damir Kedžo	Singer		WIN		WIN	SAFE	WIN	WIN	WINNER
Medo (Teddy Bear)	Zoran Šprajc	Television host	RISK		WIN		SAFE	WIN	RISK	RUNNER-UP
Čudnovište (Silly Monster)	Hiljson Mandela	Musician	WIN		WIN		SAFE	RISK	SAFE	THIRD
Leptirica (Butterfly)	Ivana Mišerić	Radio host	WIN		WIN		SAFE	WIN	OUT	
Kraljica (Queen)	Jadranka Kosor	Politician		WIN		WIN	SAFE	RISK	OUT	
Vrtni Patuljak (Garden Gnome)	Miran Kurspahić	Actor		RISK		WIN	SAFE	OUT		
Pantera (Panther)	Mila Elegović	Singer and actress		WIN		RISK	OUT			
Banana	Edin Mehmedović	Personal coach	RISK		RISK		OUT			
Joker	Mirta Miler	Influencer		RISK		OUT				
Flamingica (She Flamingo)	Sementa Rajhard	Singer and actress	WIN		OUT					
Pasta i Četkica (Paste and Brush)	Martin Sinković	Olympic rowers		OUT						
Pasta i Četkica (Paste and Brush)	Valent Sinković	Olympic rowers		OUT						
Dino	Nika Fleiss	Alpine skier	OUT							

Color key:

The mask won the duel.
The mask lost in a duel and was up for elimination, but was not eliminated.
The mask was safe from elimination.
The mask was eliminated and its identity was revealed.
The mask did not perform.

=== Episodes ===
==== Week 1 (March 11) ====
Performances on the first episode
#	Stage name	Song	Identity	Result
1	Flamingo	"Let's Get Loud" by Jennifer Lopez	WIN	
2	Banana	"Totalno sam lud" by Electro Team feat. Tony Cetinski	RISK	
3	Teddy Bear	"Evo mene moji ljudi" by Mladen Grdović	RISK	
4	Butterfly	"Spice Up Your Life" by Spice Girls	WIN	
5	Dino	"Pusti, pusti modu" by Zdravko Čolić	RISK	
6	Silly Monster	"Can't Help Falling in Love" by Elvis Presley	WIN	
Sing-Off
1	Banana	"Jump Around" by House of Pain	undisclosed	SAFE
2	Teddy Bear	"Tonka" by Daleka obala	undisclosed	SAFE
3	Dino	"Meet the Flintstones" by The B-52's	Nika Fleiss	OUT

==== Week 2 (March 18) ====
Performances on the second episode
#	Stage name	Song	Identity	Result
1	Donkey	"Let Me Entertain You" by Robbie Williams	WIN	
2	Paste and Brush	"Smokvica" by Tajči	RISK	
3	Panther	"Feel It Still" by Portugal. The Man	WIN	
4	Joker	"Poker Face" by Lady Gaga	RISK	
5	Queen	"Mamica su štrukle pekli" (Croatian folk song)	WIN	
6	Garden Gnome	"All Star" by Smash Mouth	RISK	
Sing-Off
1	Paste and Brush	"Minus i plus" by Magazin	Martin Sinković	OUT
1	Paste and Brush	"Minus i plus" by Magazin	Valent Sinković	OUT
2	Joker	"Sve još miriše na nju" by Parni Valjak	undisclosed	SAFE
3	Garden Gnome	"Ni da ni ne" by Kawasaki 3P	undisclosed	SAFE

==== Week 3 (March 25) ====
Performances on the third episode
#	Stage name	Song	Identity	Result
1	Butterfly	"Don't Start Now" by Dua Lipa	WIN	
2	Banana	"Ti si mi mislima" by Dino Dvornik	RISK	
3	Flamingo	"No Tears Left to Cry" by Ariana Grande	RISK	
4	Silly Monster	"Kad nema ljubavi" by Ilan Kabiljo	WIN	
5	Teddy Bear	"Ostat ću mlad" by Animatori	WIN	
Sing-Off
1	Banana	"U Can't Touch This" by MC Hammer	undisclosed	SAFE
2	Flamingo	"Nije mi svejedno" by Nina Badrić	Sementa Rajhard	OUT

==== Week 4 (April 1) ====
Performances on the fourth episode
#	Stage name	Song	Identity	Result
1	Panther	"Italiana" by Severina	RISK	
2	Donkey	"My Heart Will Go On" by Celine Dion	WIN	
3	Garden Gnome	"I Wanna Be Your Slave" by Måneskin	WIN	
4	Joker	"NLO" by Miach feat. Hiljson Mandela	RISK	
5	Queen	"Mama ŠČ!" by Let 3	WIN	
Sing-Off
1	Panther	"Frka" by Nipplepeople	undisclosed	SAFE
2	Joker	"Valerie" by Amy Winehouse	Mirta Miller	OUT

==== Week 5 (April 8) ====
Performances on the fifth episode
#	Stage name	Song	Identity	Result
1	Banana	"Lose Yourself" by Eminem	Edin Mehmedović	OUT
2	Silly Monster	"Ča će mi Copacabana" by Oliver Dragojević	undisclosed	SAFE
3	Butterfly	"Flowers" by Miley Cyrus	undisclosed	SAFE
4	Teddy Bear	"Evo noći, evo ludila" by Vlado Kalember	undisclosed	SAFE
5	Panther	"Hung Up" by Madonna	Mila Elegović	OUT
6	Donkey	"Vilo moja" by Vinko Coce	undisclosed	SAFE
7	Garden Gnome	"Meni se skače" by M.O.R.T.	undisclosed	SAFE
8	Queen	"Teške boje" by Majke	undisclosed	SAFE

==== Week 6 (April 15) ====
Performances on the sixth episode
#	Stage name	Song	Identity	Result
1	Silly Monster	"Wicked Game" by Chris Isaak	RISK	
2	Donkey	"Tick-Tock" by Albina	WIN	
3	Butterfly	"Kako sam te voljela" by Magazin	WIN	
4	Garden Gnome	"Danger! High Voltage" by Electric Six	RISK	
5	Queen	"Bella ciao" by Goran Bregović	RISK	
6	Teddy Bear	"Bam bam baba lu bam" by Grupa Mi	WIN	
Sing-Off
1	Silly Monster	"Theme from New York, New York" by Frank Sinatra	undisclosed	SAFE
2	Garden Gnome	"Hurt" by Johnny Cash	Miran Kurspahić	OUT
3	Queen	"Iznad Tešnja" by Halid Bešlić	undisclosed	SAFE

==== Week 7 (April 22) ====
Performances on the seventh episode
#	Stage name	Song	Identity	Result
1	Teddy Bear	"Zimmer frei" by Hladno pivo	undisclosed	RISK
2	Butterfly	"Vidi se is aviona" by Domenica	undisclosed	RISK
3	Silly Monster	"Help!" by The Beatles	undisclosed	SAFE
4	Donkey	"Trebaš li me" by Matija Cvek feat. Eni Jurišić	undisclosed	WIN
5	Queen	"Clandestino" by Manu Chao	Jadranka Kosor	OUT
Sing-Off
1	Teddy Bear	"Medo Brundo" by Oskar	undisclosed	SAFE
2	Butterfly	"As It Was" by Harry Styles	Ivana Mišerić	OUT

==== Week 8 (April 29) ====
First performances on the final episode
#	Stage name	Song
1	Silly Monster	"I'm Outta Love" by Anastacia
2	Teddy Bear	"Three Little Birds" by Bob Marley
3	Donkey	"Djevojka sa sela" by Severina

Second performances on the final episode
#	Stage name	Song	Identity	Result
1	Silly Monster	"Još Ovu Noć" by Hiljson Mandela feat. Z++	Hiljson Mandela	THIRD
2	Teddy Bear	"Ne može" by Vojko V	undisclosed	SAFE
3	Donkey	"Poljubi zemlju" by Mišo Kovač	undisclosed	SAFE

Third performances on the final episode
#	Stage name	Song	Identity	Result
1	Teddy Bear	"Osmijeh" by Grupa 220	Zoran Šprajc	RUNNER-UP
2	Donkey	"Someone You Loved" by Lewis Capaldi	Damir Kedžo	WINNER
