= Zvijezde pjevaju season 12 =

Zvijezde pjevaju
- Season 12
- Promotional poster featuring the cast of the twelfth season
- Hosted by: Duško Čurlić; Barbara Kolar
- Judges: Mario Lipovšek Battifiaca; Marko Tolja; Danijela Martinović
- Celebrity winner: Lovro Juraga
- Professional winner: Vjeko Ključarić
- No. of episodes: 7

Release
- Original network: HRT 1
- Original release: 25 March – 6 May 2023

Season chronology
- Next → Season 13

The twelfth season of Zvijezde pjevaju, the Croatian singing reality television series based on Just the Two of Us, ran from 25 March to 6 May 2023 on HRT 1. The season featured eight celebrities competing alongside their professional partners.

The season was won by Lovro Juraga and his professional partner Vjeko Ključarić.

== Cast ==
The cast of the twelfth season was revealed in February 2023.

Cast of Zvijezde pjevaju season 12
Celebrity	Notability	Professional partner	Result
Lovro Juraga	Actor	Vjeko Ključarić	Winners
Davor Jurkotić	Television personality	Gina Damjanović	Runners-up
Lucija Šerbedžija	Actress	Ivanka Mazurkijević	Eliminated 6th
Ivan Pažanin	Chef	Zsa Zsa	Eliminated 5th
Jelena Perčin	Actress	Bojan Jambrošić	Eliminated 4th
Boris Banović	Fashion designer	Ivana Kindl	Eliminated 3rd
Ana Radišić	Journalist and TV host	Alen Đuras	Eliminated 2nd
Andrea Andrassy	Columnist	Ivan Penezić	Eliminated 1st

== Scoring chart ==
Celebrity	Professional partner	Week						
Celebrity	Professional partner	1	2	3	4	5	6 (SF)	7 (F)
Lovro Juraga	Vjeko Ključarić	23	24	30	27	30	28 + 28 = 56	30 + 30 + 30 = 90
Davor Jurkotić	Gina Damjanović	15	19	23	21	27	25 + 27 = 52	28 + 30 + 30 = 88
Lucija Šerbedžija	Ivanka Mazurkijević	16	24	24	23	27	26 + 27 = 53	28 + 30 = 58
Ivan Pažanin	Zsa Zsa	10	15	15	16	19	18 + 22 = 40	
Jelena Perčin	Bojan Jambrošić	14	22	24	23	19		
Boris Banović	Ivana Kindl	12	16	16	16			
Ana Radišić	Alen Đuras	19	19	22				
Andrea Andrassy	Ivan Penezić	20	22					

== Episodes ==
No. overall	No. in season	Title	Original release date
85	1	"Episode 1"	25 March 2023
86	2	"Episode 2"	1 April 2023
87	3	"Episode 3"	8 April 2023
88	4	"Episode 4"	15 April 2023
89	5	"Episode 5"	22 April 2023
90	6	"Episode 6"	29 April 2023
91	7	"Episode 7"	6 May 2023
Winners of Zvijezde pjevaju Season Twelve: Lovro Juraga & Vjeko Ključarić
