= Farma (Croatian TV series) season 1 =

Farma
- Season 1
- Hosted by: Mia Kovačić
- No. of contestants: 18
- Winner: Rafael Dropulić

Release
- Original network: Nova TV
- Original release: 9 March – 6 June 2008

Season chronology
- Next → Season 2

The first season of Farma, a Croatian reality television series based on The Farm, premiered on 9 March 2008 and concluded on 6 June 2008 on Nova TV.

Mia Kovačić served as the main host with Davor Dretar Drele as the co-host, whereas Josip "Joža" Tučkorić mentored the contestants. Eighteen contestant of the first season were announced in February 2009. Rafael Dropulić was crowned as the winner and won 500,000 kn.

== Contestants ==
Celebrity	Home	Occupation/Notability	Age
Aleksandra Grdić	Virovitica	Model	28
Alen Macinić	Pazin	Big Brother 1 housemate	28
Boris Kosmač	Samobor	Fashion designer	31
Davorin Bogović	Zagreb	Singer	47
Fuad Backović, "Deen"	Sarajevo	Singer	26
Dvina Meler	Zagreb	Model	31
Hana Hadžiavdagić	Sarajevo	Student	22
Ivana Marić	Zagreb	Singer, ex Feminnem member	25
Jelena Urukalo	Rijeka	Model	20
Josipa Pavičić	Zagreb	Writer	29
Jura Gašparac†	Zagreb	Host	41
Stephen Lupino	Zagreb	Photographer	57
Nataša Bebić	Split	Former Basketball player / Aerobic instructor	54
Neno Pavinčić	Rijeka	TV presenter	31
Rafael Dropulić	Ploče	Story Supernova Music Talents winner	28
Slađana Petrušić	Zagreb	Model	25
Stefany Hohnjec	Poreč	Rhythmic Gymnast & Model	21
Stipe Drviš	Pula	Boxer	34

=== Voting history ===
	Week 1	Week 2	Week 3	Week 4	Week 5	Week 6	Week 7	Week 8	Week 9	Week 10	Week 11	Week 12	Final	
Head of Farm	Alen	Hana	Ivana	Hana	Stefany	Ivana	Dvina	Hana	Jelena	Dvina	Rafael	Jelena	none	
Nominated	Boris; Ivana	Boris; Stefany	Alen; Josipa	Ivana; Lupino	Davorin; Hana	Jura; Nataša	Jura; Neno	Ivana; Neno	Dvina; Hana	Jelena; Neno	Alen; Neno	Dvina; Rafael	none	
Rafael	Boris	Boris	Alen	Lupino	Davorin	Nataša	Jura	Neno	Hana	Neno	Neno	Nominated	Winner (Day 90)	
Jelena	Ivana	Boris	Josipa	Lupino	Davorin	Nataša	Jura	Ivana	Hana	Nominated	Neno	Dvina	Runner-Up (Day 90)	
Ivana	Nominated	Stefany	Josipa	Nominated	Davorin	Nataša	Jura	Nominated	Dvina	Neno	Neno	Rafael	3rd Place (Day 90)	
Dvina	Boris	Boris	Josipa	Lupino	Davorin	Nataša	Jura	Neno	Nominated	Neno	Neno	Nominated	4th Place (Day 90)	
Alen	Head of Farm	Boris	Nominated	Lupino	Davorin	Nataša	Jura	Ivana	Hana	Neno	Nominated	Dvina	Evicted (Day 83)	
Neno	Not in The Farm					Nataša	Nominated	Nominated	Dvina	Nominated	Nominated	Evicted (Day 76)		
Stefany	Boris	Nominated	Josipa	Lupino	Davorin	Nataša	Jura	Ivana	Hana	Neno	Evicted (Day 69)			
Hana	Ivana	Boris	Alen	Lupino	Nominated	Nataša	Neno	Neno	Nominated	Evicted (Day 62)				
Aleksandra	Ivana	Boris	Josipa	Lupino	Davorin	Nataša	Neno	Ivana	Evicted (Day 55)					
Jura	Not in The Farm					Nominated	Nominated	Evicted (Day 48)						
Slađana	Not in The Farm					Nataša	Walked (Day 46)							
Nataša	Not in The Farm					Nominated	Evicted (Day 41)							
Davorin	Boris	Boris	Alen	Lupino	Nominated	Evicted (Day 34)								
Lupino	Boris	Boris	Alen	Nominated	Ejected (Day 27)									
Stipe	Boris	Boris	Josipa	Lupino	Ejected (Day 27)									
Josipa	Ivana	Boris	Nominated	Evicted (Day 20)										
Boris	Nominated	Nominated	Evicted (Day 13)											
Deen	Boris	Evicted (Day 6)												
Notes	1	none	none	2	none	none	3	none	none	none	none	none	4	
Walked	none						Slađana	none						
Ejected	none			Lupino; Stipe	none									
1st Duelist (By Group)	Boris; 7/11 votes	Boris; 10/11 votes	Josipa; 6/10 votes	Lupino; 9/9 votes	Davorin; 7/7 votes	Nataša; 10/10 votes	Jura; 6/8 votes	Ivana; 4/7 votes	Hana; 4/6 votes	Neno; 5/5 votes	Neno; 4/4 votes	Dvina; 2/3 votes	none	
2nd Duelist (By Public)	Deen (By 1st Nominated)	Alen (By Public)	Aleksandra (By Public)	Alen (By Public)	Alen (By Public)	Aleksandra (By Public)	Aleksandra (By Public)	Aleksandra (By Public)	Stefany (By Public)	Stefany (By Public)	Dvina (By Public)	Alen (By Public)	none	
Evicted	Deen; Lost duel	Boris; Lost duel	Josipa; Lost duel	Eviction; Cancelled	Davorin; Lost duel	Nataša; Lost duel	Jura; Lost duel	Aleksandra; Lost duel	Hana; Lost duel	Stefany; Lost duel	Neno; Lost duel	Alen; Lost duel	Dvina; 5% to win	Ivana; 20% to win
Evicted	Deen; Lost duel	Boris; Lost duel	Josipa; Lost duel	Eviction; Cancelled	Davorin; Lost duel	Nataša; Lost duel	Jura; Lost duel	Aleksandra; Lost duel	Hana; Lost duel	Stefany; Lost duel	Neno; Lost duel	Alen; Lost duel	Jelena; 21% to win	Rafael; 54% to win

=== Notes ===
- ^Note 1 : As Head of Household, Alen in Week 1 was not required to vote between the nominations for the first duelist.
- ^Note 2 : After the 4th duel in which Alen got defeated by Lupino, Lupino and Stipe got into a physical fight which resulted their ejection. Due to an unexpected departure of the following contestants Alen got spared eviction and continued competing.
- ^Note 3 : Slađana broke the rules by leaking information in Week 7. As a punishment she was set to be the first duelist in that week and got sent to isolation. However, she refused it and walked from the competition.
- ^Note 4 : The final week the public chose who they want to win.
