= Farma (Croatian TV series) season 6 =

Croatian television show season

Farma
- Season 6
- No. of contestants: 18
- Winner: Saša Vujnović
- Runner-up: Jurica Belamarić

Release
- Original network: Nova TV
- Original release: 16 September – 17 December 2018

Season chronology
- ← Previous; Season 5 Next → Season 7

The sixth season of Croatian reality television series Farma premiered on 16 September 2018 and featured 18 new farmers. Mia Kovačić remained as the main host and Josip Tučkorić - Joža remained as mentor. Davor Dretar Drele returned to the show replacing Dušan Bučan as co-host. This season has a few changes, such as the winner of the duel receiving immunity for the next week.

The season concluded on 17 December 2018 where Saša Vujnović won against Jurica Belamarić to win the grand prize of 488,000kn and the title of Farma 2018.

== Contestants ==
Contestant	Home	Occupation	Age
Anica Orehoci	Zagreb	Babysitter	46
Đurđa Smoljanović	Zagreb	Administrative Officer	42
Edita Ptičar†	Ivanić Grad	Waitress	24
Frane Ćorić	Slavonski Brod	Locksmith	39
Ivan Mrkoci	Poznanovec	Retired Defender	45
Jasmin Kunišinac	Vinogradci	Fitofarmaceut	20
Jurica Belamarić	Zagreb	Computer Technician	23
Kristina Kesovija	Kaštel Sućurac	Beautician	28
Lucija Bujdo	Umag	Cooker	22
Maja Milišić	Ivankovo	Model	24
Maja Putica	Dubrovnik	Housewife	30
Matea Jambreković	Čazma	Waitress	23
Matej Margarin	Poznanovec	Carpenter	22
Ozren Tkalčević	Bjelovar	Bioenergoterapeut	39
Roberto Levak	Bjelovar	Waiter	22
Saša Vujnović†	Generalski Stol	Cooker	26
Srećko Vučić	Karlovac	Retired Security Guard	48
Štefica Rožnaković	Zagreb	Retired	56

=== Voting history ===
	Week 1	Week 2	Week 3	Week 4	Week 5	Week 6	Week 7	Week 8	Week 9	Week 10	Week 11	Week 12	Final			
Head of Farm	Frane	Srećko	Jasmin										none			
Nominated	Đurđa; Srećko	Frane; Maja P.											none			
Saša	Đurđa	Frane						Nominated					Winner (Day 91)			
Jurica	Đurđa	Frane											Runner-Up (Day 91)			
Ozren	Đurđa	Frane											Third Place (Day 90)			
Maja P.	Srećko	Nominated											Fourth Place (Day 89)			
Anica	Đurđa	Frane											Fifth Place (Day 88)			
Matea	Đurđa	Frane											Sixth Place (Day 88)			
Srećko	Nominated	Frane											Evicted (Day 83)			
Edita	Đurđa	Frane						Nominated				Evicted (Day 76)				
Štefica	Đurđa	Frane									Evicted (Day 69)					
Kristina	Đurđa	Frane								Evicted (Day 62)						
Roberto	Đurđa	Frane							Evicted (Day 55)							
Jasmin	Đurđa	Frane						Evicted (Day 48)								
Matej	Đurđa	Frane					Evicted (Day 41)									
Lucija	Đurđa	Frane				Evicted (Day 34)										
Ivan	Đurđa	Frane			Evicted (Day 27)											
Maja M.	Đurđa	Frane		Evicted (Day 20)												
Frane	Đurđa	Nominated	Evicted (Day 13)													
Đurđa	Nominated	Evicted (Day 6)														
1st Duelist (By Team)	Đurđa; 15/16 votes	Frane; 15/15 votes	/ votes	/ votes	/ votes	/ votes	/ votes	/ votes	/ votes	/ votes	/ votes	/ votes	none	Jurica; Maja P. Ozren; Saša	Jurica; Ozren; Saša	Jurica; Saša
2nd Duelist (By 1st Duelist)	Maja M. (By 1st Duelist)	Roberto (By 1st Duelist)	(By 1st Duelist)	(By 1st Duelist)	(By 1st Duelist)	(By 1st Duelist)	(By 1st Duelist)	(By 1st Duelist)	(By 1st Duelist)	(By 1st Duelist)	(By 1st Duelist)	(By 1st Duelist)	none	Jurica; Maja P. Ozren; Saša	Jurica; Ozren; Saša	Jurica; Saša
Evicted	Đurđa; Lost duel	Frane; Lost duel	Maja M. Lost duel	Ivan; Lost duel	Lucija; Lost duel	Matej; Lost duel	Jasmin; Lost duel	Roberto; Lost duel	Kristina; Lost duel	Štefica; Lost duel	Edita; Lost duel	Srećko; Lost duel	Matea; Lost challenge	Maja P. Lost duel	Ozren; Lost duel	Jurica; Lost duel
Evicted	Đurđa; Lost duel	Frane; Lost duel	Maja M. Lost duel	Ivan; Lost duel	Lucija; Lost duel	Matej; Lost duel	Jasmin; Lost duel	Roberto; Lost duel	Kristina; Lost duel	Štefica; Lost duel	Edita; Lost duel	Srećko; Lost duel	Anica; Lost challenge	Maja P. Lost duel	Ozren; Lost duel	Saša; Winner
