= Zvijezde pjevaju season 13 =

Zvijezde pjevaju
- Season 13
- Promotional poster featuring the cast of the thirteenth season
- Hosted by: Duško Čurlić; Barbara Kolar
- Judges: Mario Lipovšek Battifiaca; Marko Tolja; Danijela Martinović
- Celebrity winner: Igor Barberić
- Professional winner: Ivana Kindl
- No. of episodes: 6

Release
- Original network: HRT 1
- Original release: 30 March – 4 May 2024

Season chronology
- ← Previous; Season 12

The thirteenth season of Zvijezde pjevaju, the Croatian singing reality television series based on Just the Two of Us, ran from 30 March to 4 May 2024 on HRT 1. The season featured eight celebrities competing alongside their professional partners.

Duško Čurlić and Barbara Kolar returned as the hosts for the season, with singers Mario Lipovšek Battifiaca, Marko Tolja and Danijela Martinović making up the professional jury.

The season concluded after 6 episodes on 4 May 2024 and was won by Igor Barberić and his professional partner Ivana Kindl.

== Cast ==
The cast of the thirteenth season was announced in March 2024. A total of eight celebrities and their professional partners competed.

Cast of Zvijezde pjevaju season 13
Celebrity	Notability	Professional partner	Result
Nicolas Quesnoit	Dancer	Neda Parmać	Eliminated 1st
Tara Rosandić	Actress	Lara Antić Prskalo	Eliminated 2nd
Jelena Pajić	TV host	Vjeko Ključarić	Eliminated 3rd
Ivana Mišerić	TV host	Alen Đuras	Eliminated 4th
Lejla Filipović	Model	Bojan Jambrošić	Eliminated 5th
Dea Presečki	Actress	Dino Petrić	Eliminated 6th
Mihovil Španja	Paralympic swimmer	Goran Bošković	Runners-up
Igor Barberić	Dancer	Ivana Kindl	Winners

== Scoring chart ==
Celebrity	Professional partner	Week					
Celebrity	Professional partner	1	2	3	4	5 (SF)	6 (F)
Igor Barberić	Ivana Kindl	26	29	30	28	30 + 30 = 60	30 + 30 + 30 = 90
Mihovil Španja	Goran Bošković	22	23	22	25	28 + 26 = 54	30 + 30 + 30 = 90
Dea Presečki	Dino Petrić	24	27	27	27	25 + 30 = 55	30 + 30 = 60
Lejla Filipović	Bojan Jambrošić	22	23	21	22	22 + 24 = 46	
Ivana Mišerić	Alen Đuras	22	22	23	26	22 + 27 = 49	
Jelena Pajić	Vjeko Ključarić	24	25	24	25		
Tara Rosandić	Lara Antić Prskalo	24	24	21			
Nicolas Quesnoit	Neda Parmać	19	21				

== Episodes ==
No. overall	No. in season	Title	Original release date
92	1	"Episode 1"	30 March 2024
Performances: Lejla & Bojan: "Ti si želja mog života" by Magazin; Igor & Ivana: "You Make Me Feel"; Jelena & Vjeko: "Hello"; Mihovil & Goran: "Ljubav za sve" by Sandi Cenov; Tara & Lara: At Last by Etta James; Nicola & Neda: "Ja sam zaljubljen" by Tony Cetinski; Dea & Dino: "Prozor prema zalazu" by Đani Maršan; Ivana & Alen: "Oči boje kestena" by Ivana Brkić
93	2	"Episode 2"	6 April 2024
Performances: Nicola & Neda: "It Takes Two" by Marvin Gaye & Kim Weston; Dea & Dino: "Jovano, Jovanke"; Ivana & Alen: "American Woman" by Lenny Kravitz; Lejla & Bojan: "Pjevat ćemo šta nam srce zna" by Amira Medunjanin; Igor & Ivana: "I Beliieve in a Thing Called Love" by The Darkness; Jelena & Vjeko: "Naranča" by Putokazi; Mihovil & Goran: "Treba mi nešto jače od sna" by Opća opasnost; Tara & Lara: "Ljubav se ne trži"; Eliminated: Nicolas Quesnoit & Neda Parmać
94	3	"Episode 3"	13 April 2024
Performances: Tara & Lara: "Maniac" by Michael Sembello; Mihovil & Goran: "U svakom slučaju te volim" by Ibrica Jusić; Jelena & Vjeko: "Just Give Me a Reason" by Pink; Ivana & Alen: "Balada iz predgrađa" by Hrvoje Hegedušić; Dea & Dino: "Dolje na koljena" by Vesna Pisarović; Igor & Ivana: "Trešnjevačka balada" by Zvonko Špišić; Lejla & Bojan: "Ja samo pjevam" by Severina; Eliminated: Tara Rosandić & Lara Antić Prskalo
95	4	"Episode 4"	20 April 2024
Performances: Dea & Dino: "Praviš me ludim" by Matija Cvek; Igor & Ivana: "Empire State of Mind" by Jay-Z; Lejla & Bojan: "Disco" by The Bastardz; Mihovil & Goran: "Smak svita" by TBF; Jelena & Vjeko: "Super Freak" by Rick James; Ivana & Alen: "Mamma Mia" by Grše; Eliminated: Jelena Pajić & Vjeko Ključarić
96	5	"Episode 5"	27 April 2024
Eliminated: Ivana Mišerić & Alen Đuras and Lejla Filipović & Bojan Jambrošić
97	6	"Episode 6"	4 May 2024
Winners of Zvijezde pjevaju Season Thirteen: Igor Barberić & Ivana Kindl
