= Story Supernova Music Talents =

- Genre: Reality competition
- Based on: Pop Idol by Simon Fuller
- Country of origin: Croatia
- Original language: Croatian
- No. of seasons: 1

Original release
- Network: Nova TV
- Release: 2003 – 2003

Related
- Hrvatski Idol

Story Supernova Music Talents is a Croatian singing reality competition television series that was the first Croatian version of American Idol. The series ran for one season in 2003 on Nova TV. It was co-produced with Story, a Croatian tabloid, hence the name.

The show was won by Rafael Dropulić, with Saša Lozar as the runner-up.

== Judges ==
The jury was composed of several well known figures in Croatian music, including:

- Đorđe Novković
- Miroslav Škoro
- Vinko Štefanac

== Contestants ==
The show has introduced 20 performers, some of which later released music records, including:

- Aleksandra Kežić
- Maja Zeko
- Roman Oršuš
- Cristiana-Iovanca Uichita
- Mirela Bunoza
- Mladen Akrap
- Jana Tkalec
- Jelena Bosančić
- Nikolina Božić
- Sanja Parmać
- Stjepan Marković
- Emina Arapović
- Valentina Gyerek
- Ivana Radovniković
- Damir Kedžo
- Tin Samardžić
- Nera Stipičević
- Natali Dizdar
- Saša Lozar
- Rafael Dropulić

== Legacy ==
Saša Lozar, Tin Samardžić and Damir Kedžo formed Saša, Tin i Kedžo, the first Croatian boy band, during their time on the show. The band released a commercially successful single titled 365. Lozar and Kedžo remained well-known names in Croatian pop music; Kedžo won Dora 2020 and was set to represent Croatia at Eurovision Song Contest 2020, which was cancelled due to COVID-19 pandemic.

Rafael Dropulić, the winner of Story Supernova, went on to win the first season of reality series Farma in 2008. Valentina Gyerek went on to compete in The Voice Hrvatska in 2016. Other contestants that remained well-known in music include Natali Dizdar, Nera Stipičević, and Ivana Radovniković.

== Subsequent editions ==
Although Story Supernova did not run beyond its initial season, Nova TV went on to air Hrvatski Idol, a new edition of the series, for two seasons between 2004 and 2005.

RTL went on to air its own version of Idol: Star Search Croatia ran from 2009 to 2011, and Superstar premiered in 2023.
