= Nikolina Ristović =

Croatian television presenter and actress

- Born: Nikolina Pišek; 8 April 1973 (age 53); Zagreb, SR Croatia, Yugoslavia
- Occupations: Television presenter; actress
- Spouse: Vidoje Ristović (m. 2013; died 2022)
- Children: 2

Nikolina Ristović (née Pišek; pronounced [nikolǐːna rǐstoʋitɕ] née [pǐʃek]; born 8 April 1973) is a Croatian television presenter and actress.

== Early life ==
Born in Zagreb to mother Nada, young Nikolina was raised with a younger brother Domagoj. Teenage Nikolina reportedly briefly modeled in Milan before returning home and enrolling in the design studies program at the University of Zagreb's Faculty of Architecture.

Through her university studies, Pišek soon applied and got hired as a photographer at Globus magazine. She eventually also began writing a fashion column at the magazine.

After graduating, she worked as set designer for a few theatre productions, including the staging of Madama Butterfly at the Croatian National Theatre in Osijek. Afterwards, she worked in music video production.

== Television career ==
=== 2000s ===
Pišek's on-camera television career began in her mid-twenties courtesy of television producer Siniša Svilan who hired her to co-present an entertainment, gossip, and lifestyle show he was in charge of developing on the country's public broadcaster HRT in 2003. The Svilan-created Glamour Cafe featured co-hosts Pišek and Nina Skorup doing bits and interviews with plenty of innuendo and overt sexuality. Somewhat provocative nature of the show, combined with the duo of physically attractive young female hosts, turned a lot of heads. Young Pišek's sudden prominence in Croatia led to an offer of a pictorial for the Croatian edition of Playboy and she appeared in the magazine's July 2003 issue.

When Glamour Cafe was taken off air, Pišek landed on Shpitza, another HRT gossip entertainment programme, this time co-hosting alongside Danijel Despot. Shpitza's main competition was similarly conceptualized Red Carpet programme on the rival Nova TV station.

By now a public personality in Croatia, in March 2007, Pišek hosted Dora, Croatian selection for the Eurovision Song Contest. She started getting bit acting offers as well, which led to an appearance on the Bitange i princeze TV series. In 2007 she participated as contestant on the second season of Ples sa zvijezdama, the Croatian version of Strictly Come Dancing, airing on HRT.

Shpitza somewhat ran out of steam and frequent changes at the male co-host position ensued. Despot got replaced by Mario Petreković who, in turn, quickly gave way to Luka Bulić. Soon, the show started losing viewership rapidly to Red Carpet, quickly leading to it being taken off the air in late 2007. In early 2008, Pišek co-hosted a youth-oriented talk show Na domaćem terenu with Mirko Fodor, also on HRT.

In late summer 2008, she left the state-run HRT for privately-owned Nova TV, thus reuniting with Siniša Svilan who had in the meantime become Nova's head of programming. Once there, she got added to the daily Red Carpet stable of hosts, eventually getting her own timeslot with a slightly-modified version of the show named Red Carpet Light.

Arguably her biggest break came in late September 2008, almost simultaneously to her network switch, when she was announced as one of the four hosts of Operacija Trijumf (local Star Academy version for the five Balkan countries that used to be a part of Yugoslavia) alongside Milan Kalinić, Ana Mihajlovski, and Maca Marinković. Weekly appearances on the hugely popular 3-month reality singing contest that aired on 6 networks and was seen by a large audience throughout Balkans led to a surge of popularity for her as well as expanded career opportunities outside Croatia. Among those are co-hosting the 2009 Pjesma Mediterana festival in Budva with Ognjen Amidžić during early June 2009 and being slated to appear in a recurring acting role in a Serbian sitcom.

Throughout 2009 and 2010, she continued appearing on Nova TV programmes. She worked as a studio co-host during seasons 2 and 3 of the Farma reality show alongside Mia Kovačić and Dražen "Kocka" Kocijan. Pišek also took over for Ana Stunić hosting IN magazin. In fall 2010, she was cast in a recurring role on the Croatian daily soap opera Najbolje godine: from November 2010 until June 2011, Pišek ended up appearing in 89 episodes of the show.

=== 2010s ===
In the aftermath of her appearances on the hugely-popular Operacija trijumf, simultaneously to working on Nova TV in Croatia, Pišek began devoting more attention to raising her profile in the Serbian media market with regular appearances in the country's tabloids and lifestyle magazines. Furthermore to the end, in 2011, her collaboration with the young Serbian pop singer Saša Kovačević was arranged via a song called "Idemo do mene".

Throughout late summer and early fall 2011, the news of her transfer to RTV Pink and relocation to Serbia received a lot of media attention throughout the Balkans. The show she was eventually attached to on Pink was a newly launched weekly late-night programme meant to compete with a more established Veče sa Ivanom Ivanovićem, which was going into its third season on the rival 1Prva network.

From 2012 to 2013, she was the host of the dating show Sami u tami on Prva TV. She was the host of the showbiz magazine Exkluziv in 2016. for same television.

From September 2013 to 2014, Nikolina one of Tv hosts of infotainment show Bulevar B92 on TV B92.

In 2018, Nikolina worked for Happy TV, and show that she was hosting on that network was the first season of the quiz Soba sreće along with Ivan Bauer.

=== 2020s ===
From September 2022, Nikolina is one of the hosts of the talk show Donna, along with Dejana Rosuljaš and Baya Bangue Namkosse on Una TV, regional TV channel with centres in Belgrade and Banja Luka.

In 2023, Nikolina returned to the Croatian television, succeeding Antonija Blaće as the host of the second season of the Croatian version of Masked Singer on RTL. Through 2023 and 2024, she hosted To je Voyo on RTL.

In 2025, Nikolina is the host of new season of reality show Farma, Croatian version of The Farm. This season is the first season broadcast on RTL and its streaming service Voyo in Croatia, Serbia and Bosnia and Herzegovina.

== Personal life ==
In 1997, Pišek began a relationship with journalist Mark Cigoj, writing for Globus magazine at the time. Only a few months into dating him, Pišek became pregnant and gave birth to their daughter Hana Leonarda. The relationship with Cigoj subsequently ended.

Throughout 2006, Pišek dated the Croatian businessman Tomislav Totić.

From the summer of 2007, Pišek started a relationship with the Croatian professional scuba diver and freediving champion Kristijan Curavić, having first met him while attending his scuba diving course in Rogoznica. The couple got engaged in spring 2009. Throughout spring and early summer 2010, Curavić was a contestant on the third season of the Farma reality show while Pišek worked as the program's studio host. The couple split during summer 2010, shortly after the show season's end, amid reports of Curavić starting a relationship with fellow Farma contestant Žana Štrbac.

In 2010, Pišek began dating the Berlin-based Serbian businessman Matija Ćorković. The relationship ended in 2012.

Pišek married Vidoje Ristović in September 2013, and moved to Belgrade. She gave birth to their child, daughter Una Sofija, in 2014. Vidoje died in May 2022.
