= Farma (Croatian TV series) season 4 =

Farma (Croatian TV series) television season

Farma
- Season 4
- Hosted by: Mia Kovačić; Dušan Bućan
- No. of contestants: 18
- Winner: Blaženka Slamar
- Runner-up: Anna Mišar

Release
- Original network: Nova TV
- Original release: 6 September – 19 December 2015

Season chronology
- ← Previous; Season 3 Next → Season 5

The fourth season of the Croatian reality television series Farma, titled Farma: Novi Početak (English: New Beginning), premiered on 6 September 2015 on Nova TV. It is the first season since 2010 and also first season to not feature celebrities. Mia Kovačić returns as host and Josip Tučkorić - Joža returnes as mentor. Davor Dretar Drele, former co-host, is replaced by Dušan Bučan. This is also the first season to not feature the studio a reportage and live duels.

After 103 days, Blaženka Slamar was crowned as the winner and won 425,000 kunas.

== Format ==
Seven men and seven women will start their new lives at an isolated country estate where they will have to build a self-sustaining community and prove that they are strong, hardworking, determined, dedicated and persistent. In addition to the 14 contestants, several challengers also appeared; some returning contestants who will brought additional unrest and confusion to the farm. Farmers played various roles during their stay on the Farm: the Master, the Servants and the Maids.

== Contestants ==
Contestant	Home	Occupation	Age
Aldo Scrollavezza	Prigorje Brdovečko	Programmer	51
Aleksandra Ognjena Herjavić	Zagreb	Tattoo master	31
Anamarija Džambazov	Zagreb	Hostess	26
Anita Vein Dević	Rijeka	Economist / Bartender	28
Anna Mišar	Zagreb	Secretary	35
Blaženka Slamar	Slavonski Brod	Housewife	47
Donald Jurcan	Sveti Lovreč	Truck driver	38
Hrvoje Karas	Kozarevac	Motocross driver	24
Ivan Lehocki	Osijek	Geophysicist	35
Ivica Vukorepa	Kaštel Stari	Technician for rail traffic	31
Josip Šimičić	Gornje Postinje	Retired policeman	60
Kristina Pilko Demirikiran	Rijeka	Marketing and PR manager	35
Marija Prekodravac	Zagreb	Dealer	26
Matija Pavić	Rab	Car restorer	22
Miriam Pribanić	Bakarac	Dog breeder	54
Nedjeljko Bugarija	Bibinje	Retired soldier	44
Roman Kokorić	Zagreb	Physiotherapist	45
Sara Žderić	Ploče	Economist	23

=== Voting history ===
	Week 1	Week 2	Week 3	Week 4	Week 5	Week 6	Week 7	Week 8	Week 9	Week 10	Week 11	Week 12	Week 13	Week 14	Final		
Head of Farm	Josip	Ivica	Anamarija	Sara	Anna	Ivan	Anita	Aleksandra	Anamarija	Miriam	Anna	Miriam	Aldo	Anna	none		
Nominated	Anamarija; Hrvoje	Anna; Roman	Aldo; Kristina	Blaženka; Ivica	Josip; Sara	Miriam; Nedjeljko	~~Anna~~ Aleksandra; ~~Josip~~ Donald	Sara; Ivan	Miriam; Josip	Anna; Ivica	Blaženka; Aldo	Anna; Josip	Ivica; Miriam	Ivan; Blaženka	none		
Viewers' immunity	Hrvoje	Hrvoje	Aldo	Anna	Josip	Miriam	Josip	Ivan	Josip	Ivica	Aldo	Anna	Aldo	Ivan	none		
Blaženka	Anamarija	No voting	Aldo	Nominated	Sara	Evicted (Day 34)			Josip	Ivica	Nominated	Josip	Miriam	Nominated	Winner (Day 103)		
Anna	Hrvoje	Nominated	Kristina	Ivica	Josip; Sara	Nedjeljko	Aleksandra	Ivan	Miriam	Nominated	Blaženka	Nominated	Ivica	Blaženka	Runner Up (Day 103)		
Ivica	Hrvoje	Head of Farm	Kristina	Nominated	Sara	Nedjeljko	Aleksandra	Sara	Miriam	Nominated	Aldo	Josip	Nominated	Ivan	Third Place (Day 103)		
Ivan	Hrvoje	No voting	Kristina	Blaženka	Josip	Nedjeljko	Aleksandra	Nominated	Miriam	Ivica	Aldo	Josip	Miriam	Nominated	Fourth Place (Day 102)		
Aldo	Anamarija	No voting	Nominated	Ivica	Josip	Walked (Day 37)		Sara	Josip	Ivica	Nominated	Anna	Ivica	Ivan	Evicted (Day 97)		
Miriam	Hrvoje	No voting	Aldo	Ivica	Sara	Nominated	Aleksandra	Ivan	Nominated	Ivica	Blaženka	Josip	Nominated	Evicted (Day 90)			
Josip	Anamarija	No voting	Aldo	Blaženka	Nominated	Nedjeljko	Aleksandra	Sara	Nominated	Ivica	Blaženka	Nominated	Evicted (Day 83)				
Aleksandra	Not in the Farm						Nominated	Sara	Josip	Anna	Blaženka	Evicted (Day 76)					
Anamarija	Nominated	No voting	Kristina	Ivica	Josip	Nedjeljko	Aleksandra	Ivan	Miriam; Josip	Anna	Evicted (Day 69)						
Anita	Not in the Farm					Nedjeljko	Aleksandra	Ivan	Josip	Evicted (Day 62)							
Sara	Anamarija	No voting	Aldo	Blaženka	Nominated	Miriam	Aleksandra	Nominated	Evicted (Day 55)								
Donald	Not in the Farm						Nominated	Evicted (Day 48)									
Nedjeljko	Not in the Farm				Sara	Nominated	Evicted (Day 41)										
Roman	Hrvoje	Nominated	Aldo	Ivica	Evicted (Day 27)												
Kristina	Anamarija	No voting	Nominated	Evicted (Day 20)													
Hrvoje	Nominated	No voting	Walked (Day 17)														
Marija	Hrvoje	No voting	Evicted (Day 13)														
Matija	Anamarija	Evicted (Day 6)															
Notes	none	1	2	none	3, 4	3, 5	6, 5	none	7, 4	none					8		
Walked	none		Hrvoje	none		Aldo	none										
1st Duelist (By Group)	Anamarija; 6/12 votes	Marija; Anamarija	Kristina; 4/9 votes	Ivica; 5/8 votes	Sara; 5/9 votes	Nedjeljko; 6/7 votes	Aleksandra; 8/8 votes	Sara; 4/8 votes	Miriam; 4/9 votes	Anna; 2/7 votes	Blaženka; 4/6 votes	Josip; 4/5 votes	Miriam; 2/4 votes	Blaženka; 1/3 votes	Anna; Ivan	Blaženka; Ivica	Anna; Blaženka
2nd Duelist (1st Duelist)	Matija (By 1st Duelist)	Marija; Anamarija	Anna (By 1st Duelist)	Roman (By 1st Duelist)	Blaženka (By 1st Duelist)	Ivica (By 1st Duelist)	Donald (By 1st Duelist)	Anna (By 1st Duelist)	Anita (By 1st Duelist)	Anamarija (By 1st Duelist)	Aleksandra (By 1st Duelist)	Blaženka (By 1st Duelist)	Anna (By 1st Duelist)	Aldo (By 1st Duelist)	Anna; Ivan	Blaženka; Ivica	Anna; Blaženka
Evicted	Matija; Lost duel	Marija; Lost duel	Kristina; Lost duel	Roman; Lost duel	Blaženka; Lost duel	Nedjeljko; Lost duel	Donald; Lost duel	Sara; Lost duel	Blaženka; Most votes to return	Anamarija; Lost duel	Aleksandra; Lost duel	Josip; Lost duel	Miriam; Lost duel	Aldo; Lost duel	Ivan; Lost duel	Ivica; Lost duel	Anna; Lost duel
Evicted	Matija; Lost duel	Marija; Lost duel	Kristina; Lost duel	Roman; Lost duel	Blaženka; Lost duel	Nedjeljko; Lost duel	Donald; Lost duel	Sara; Lost duel	Anita; Lost duel	Anamarija; Lost duel	Aleksandra; Lost duel	Josip; Lost duel	Miriam; Lost duel	Aldo; Lost duel	Ivan; Lost duel	Ivica; Lost duel	Blaženka; Winner

=== Notes ===
- ^Note 1 : As a result of Anamarija's multiple provocations Marija slapped her. Due to both competitors breaking one of the main rules they got isolated and directly sent into the duel. The nomination ceremony was canceled due to following occasions.
- ^Note 2 : Hrvoje became homesick and felt that the whole experience was too much for him so he decided to withdraw from the competition.
- ^Note 3 : Nedjeljko and Anita, new castmembers, arrive as the replacements for Hrvoje. Nedjeljko arrives in Week 5 and Anita in Week 6.
- ^Note 4 : After the voting in Week 5 there was a tie between Sara and Josip. Anna as the Head of Farm had to decide whom to send in the duel as a tiebreaker. She decided to go against her original vote, which was Josip, and sent Sara in the duel as the first duelist of the week. The same thing happened in Week 9 when Anamarija changed her vote from Miriam to Josip.
- ^Note 5 : Aldo initially withdrew from the competition after he was too ill to continue his stay in the game. However, he returned in the game 10 days after leaving.
- ^Note 6 : Aleksandra and Donald arrive as the challengers at week 7. They challenged Anita, the Head of Farm, to compete in a duel. If the challengers won they would take control over the Farm. However, Anita won the duel against Aleksandra and replaced her initial nomination choices, Anna and Josip with Aleksandra and Donald.
- ^Note 7 : On Day 57 the farmers got a chance to bring back one eliminated player. After a four-way tie between Marija, Blaženka, Nedjeljko & Sara with 2 votes it was Anamarija as the Head of Farm who had to make a decision. On Day 58 she decided Blaženka would be returning.
- ^Note 8 : In the final week there was no selection process and final four players drew tournament duel matchups that would determinate the winner of the season. Anna was selected to compete against Ivan and Blaženka was selected to compete against Ivica. The winners of those two duels would face each other for the grand prize and the losers went home empty handed.Ivan lost the duel against Anna on Day 102 placing fourth overall and Ivica lost the duel against Blaženka on Day 103 placing third overall. Anna & Blaženka faced each other later on Day 103 with Blaženka being crowned as the Season 4 winner.
