= Jelena Perčin =

Croatian actress (born 1981)

- Born: 19 January 1981 (age 45); Dubrovnik, SR Croatia, SFR Yugoslavia
- Occupation: Actress
- Spouses: Kristijan Babić (m. 2008; div. 2011) Momčilo Otašević (m. 2018; div. 2023)
- Children: 3

Jelena Perčin (born 19 January 1981) is a Croatian actress.

== Early life ==
Jelena Perčin was born on 19 January 1981 in Dubrovnik.

== Career ==
After completing her first year at the Academy of Dramatic Art in Zagreb, Perčin landed her first role in 2001, performing in The Fourth Sister, directed by Ivica Boban for Dubrovnik Summer Festival.

In the 2000s, Perčin became known as a television actress, initially starring in Villa Maria (2005), the first Croatian telenovela, and later in Zabranjena ljubav (2004–2011), the first Croatian soap opera. In 2011, she competed on the sixth season of Ples sa zvijezdama, the Croatian edition of Strictly Come Dancing. She placed fourth with her professional partner Hrvoje Kraševac. In 2023, Perčin competed in the twelfth season of Zvijezde pjevaju.

In 2024, Perčin was announced as one of the main cast members of RTL's drama television series Sjene prošlosti. She would later receive a nomination for the Večernjak's Rose award for her portrayal of Marta Novak, the central antagonist of the series. Since 2025, Perčin stars in Divlje pčele.

== Filmography ==
=== Television ===
Year	Title	Role	Notes
2005	Villa Maria	Majda Polovanec	
2005	Naša mala klinika	Šemsina djevojka	Guest role
2006	Bibin svijet	Snježana "Snješkica"	Guest role
2005–2007	Zabranjena ljubav	Ana Fijan	
2007–2008	Dobre namjere	Nina Deverić	
2008	Bitange i princeze	Lana	Guest role
2008	Hitna 94	Ivona Zlatar	
2010–2011	Najbolje godine	Dunja Dizdar-Lehner	
2011	Ples sa zvijezdama	Herself	Season 6 contestant
2013–2014	Zora dubrovačka	Deša Šimunović Marković	
2015–2016	Kud puklo da puklo	Miranda Žeravica	
2017	Ko te šiša	glumica u sapunici	
2023	Zvijezde pjevaju	Herself	Season 12 contestant
2023	Gora	Jakovova mama	
2024–2025	Sjene prošlosti	Marta Novak	Main role
2025–present	Divlje pčele	Rajka Bauer	
2025	Volim Hrvatsku	Herself	Season 12 guest
