= Farma (Croatian TV series) season 5 =

Croatian reality television series

Farma
- Season 5
- Hosted by: Mia Kovačić; Dušan Bućan
- No. of contestants: 18
- Winner: Goran Kaleb
- Runner-up: Josipa Tomljanović

Release
- Original network: Nova TV
- Original release: 4 September – 23 December 2016

Season chronology
- ← Previous; Season 4 Next → Season 6

The fifth season of the Croatian reality television series Farma premiered on 4 September 2016 on Nova TV and featured 18 new farmers. Mia Kovačić and Dušan Bućan returned as hosts, while Josip Tučkorić - Joža returned as mentor. The format was similar to that of the previous season. The season concluded on 23 December 2016 when Goran Kaleb won the final duel against Josipa Tomljanović to win the grand prize 500,000kn and the title of Farma.

== Format ==
18 farmers were divided into 2 teams of 9 on different farms (Team Modern Farm vs. Team Old Farm). Each Farm had its own Head of Farm and servants (who were chosen by the whole house instead of the Head of Farm only) and they will compete for team immunity. The winning team is safe from the Duel.

The Duels featured 3 cycles. In the first one, the first duelist was chosen by the losing team and the first duelist chooses his opponent from his team. The difference in the second cycle is that the first duelist can choose his opponent from the winning team too. In the third and final cycle, the teams merge into one farm.

== Contestants ==
Contestant	Residence	Occupation	Age
Ankica Šadek	Novigrad Podravski	Housewife	51
Ante Baždarić	Split	Chef / Waiter	20
Barbara Peterčić	Velika Gorica	Bookkeeper	24
Dalia Domijan	Bjelovar	Dealer	35
Damir Toplek	Čakovec	Mechanical engineer	41
Daniela Antunović	Velika Gorica	Dealer	31
Danijel Vegh	Ludbreg	Fitness trainer	38
Darko Domijan	Bjelovar	Musician	66
Igor Trajbar	Krk	Retired	50
Goran Kaleb	Rogotin	Sport animator	28
Gordan Grabovac	Sinj	Retired military	44
Jasmina Milaković	Munich, Germany	Chemical technician	30
Josipa Tomljanović	Požega	Caterer	29
Katica Pučnik†	Zagreb	Retired	59
Kristijan Nikšić	Prugovac	Agricultural technician	23
Lara Đunđuš	Pušćine	Hostess	22
Sara Đunđuš	Pušćine	Nurse / Dogs trainer	24
Senad Bećirović	Zagreb	Realtor	58
Tomislav Crnčević	Zagreb	Painter	29
Zinka Dekanić	Zagreb	Economist	55

=== Mini Duels ===
A brand new feature this season is the Mini Duels. In each one two farmers from the winning team compete for a reward of their own choice.

Week	Competitor		Winner (Wish)
1	Jasmina	Sara	Jasmina (Bathtub)
2	Damir	Katica	Damir (Pizza & Beer)
3	Barbara	Daniela	Barbara (Feast)
4	Ankica	Sara	Ankica (Husband's letter)
5	Barbara	Kristijan	Kristijan (A family letter)
6	Ante	Tomislav	Tomislav (Brother's letter)
7	Jasmina	Kristijan	Kristijan (Beer)
8	Ante	Josipa	Josipa (A cake)
9	Goran	Gordan	Goran (An octopus)
10	Barbara	Kristijan	Barbara (A family letter)
11	Ante	Ankica	Ankica (A family letter)
12	Damir	Goran	Goran (A family letter)
13	Gordan	Josipa	Gordan (Lamb)

=== Voting history ===
Color key
– Team Red
– Team Green

	Week 1	Week 2	Week 3	Week 4	Week 5	Week 6	Week 7	Week 8	Week 9	Week 10	Week 11	Week 12	Week 13	Week 14	Week 15	Final		
Cycle	1				2				3									
Head(s) of Farm	Goran	Goran	Goran	Ante	Goran	Goran	Goran	Goran	Barbara	Tomislav	Damir	Gordan	Josipa	Damir	Goran	none		
Head(s) of Farm	Kristijan	Daniela	Daniela	Daniela	Darko	Darko	Daniela	Daniela	Barbara	Tomislav	Damir	Gordan	Josipa	Damir	Goran	none		
Nominated	Gordan; Jasmina	Gordan; Lara	Gordan; Sara	Gordan; Ankica	Ante; Jasmina	Tomislav; Barbara	Tomislav; Barbara	Tomislav; Barbara	Darko; Ankica	Goran; Daniela	Tomislav; Barbara	Ante; Josipa	Damir; Tomislav	Ante; Goran	Damir; Tomislav	none		
Nominated	Danijel; Zinka	Damir; Katica	Damir; Barbara	Damir; Katica	Kristijan; Barbara	Gordan; Ankica	Gordan; Jasmina	Gordan; Jasmina	Darko; Ankica	Goran; Daniela	Tomislav; Barbara	Ante; Josipa	Damir; Tomislav	Ante; Goran	Damir; Tomislav	none		
HoF's assistants	none								Goran; Kristijan	Gordan; Kristijan	Josipa; Kristijan	Kristijan; Tomislav	Ante; Goran	Gordan; Tomislav	Gordan; Josipa	none		
Viewers' immunity	Barbara	Gordan	Gordan	Barbara	Jasmina	Gordan	Tomislav	Gordan	Gordan	Goran	Tomislav	Ante	Tomislav	Tomislav	Tomislav	none		
Goran	No voting	Lara	Gordan	No voting	Jasmina	No voting	Tomislav	No voting	Ankica	Nominated	Tomislav	Ante	Tomislav	Nominated	Tomislav	Winner (Day 110)		
Josipa	Zinka	No voting	No voting	Damir	Jasmina	No voting	Tomislav	No voting	Ankica	Daniela	Barbara	Nominated	Tomislav	Ante	Tomislav	Runner Up (Day 110)		
Tomislav	No voting	Lara	Gordan	No voting	Jasmina	No voting	Nominated	No voting	Darko	Daniela	Nominated	Ante	Nominated	Goran	Nominated	Third Place (Day 109)		
Gordan	No voting	Nominated	Nominated	No voting	No voting	Nominated	No voting	Nominated	Darko	Daniela	Barbara	Ante	Tomislav	Goran	Tomislav	Fourth Place (Day 108)		
Damir	Zinka	No voting	No voting	Nominated	Evicted (Day 27)				Ankica	Daniela	Tomislav	Ante	Nominated	Goran	Nominated	Re-evicted (Day 104)		
Ante	No voting	Lara	Gordan	No voting	Nominated	No voting	Barbara	No voting	Darko	Daniela	Tomislav	Nominated	Tomislav	Nominated	Evicted (Day 97)			
Ankica	No voting	Lara	Gordan	No voting	No voting	Nominated	Evicted (Day 41)		Nominated	Daniela	Barbara	Ante	Tomislav	Re-evicted (Day 90)				
Kristijan	Zinka	No voting	No voting	Damir	No voting	Gordan	No voting	Gordan	Darko	Daniela	Tomislav	Ante	Evicted (Day 83)					
Barbara	Zinka	No voting	No voting	Damir	No voting	No voting	Nominated	No voting	Ankica	Daniela	Nominated	Evicted (Day 76)						
Daniela	Zinka	No; Voting	No voting	Damir	No voting	Gordan	No voting	Jasmina	Darko	Nominated	Evicted (Day 69)							
Darko	Zinka	No voting	No voting	Damir	No voting	Gordan	No voting	Jasmina	Nominated	Evicted (Day 62)								
Jasmina	No voting	Gordan	Sara	No voting	Nominated	Gordan	No voting	Nominated	Evicted (Day 55)									
Katica	Zinka	No voting	No voting	Nominated	Jasmina	No voting	Tomislav	Evicted (Day 48)										
Sara	No voting	Lara	Nominated	No voting	Jasmina	Evicted (Day 34)												
Dalia	Not in The Farm			No voting	Walked (Day 30)													
Igor	Not in The Farm			Damir	Walked (Day 27)													
Senad	No voting	Lara	Sara	Evicted (Day 20)														
Lara	No voting	Nominated	Evicted (Day 13)															
Danijel	Nominated	Walked (Day 6)																
Zinka	Nominated	Evicted (Day 6)																
Notes	1,2,3	1,2		1,2,4,5	1,6,7,8	1,8,9	1,8		10	11	none					12		
Walked	Danijel	none		Igor	Dalia	none												
1st Duelist (By Team)	Zinka; 7/7 votes	Lara; 6/7 votes	Sara; 2/6 votes	Damir; 6/6 votes	Ante; 0/5 votes	Ankica; 0/4 votes	Barbara; 1/4 votes	Jasmina; 2/3 votes	Darko; 5/9 votes	Daniela; 8/8 votes	Barbara; 3/7 votes	Josipa; 0/6 votes	Damir; 0/5 votes	Goran; 3/4 votes	Damir; 0/3 votes	Goran; Gordan	Josipa; Tomislav	Goran; Josipa
2nd Duelist (By 1st Duelist)	Katica (By 1st Duelist)	Sara (By 1st Duelist)	Senad (By 1st Duelist)	Kristijan (By 1st Duelist)	Sara (By 1st Duelist)	Barbara (By 1st Duelist)	Katica (By 1st Duelist)	Barbara (By 1st Duelist)	Tomislav (By 1st Duelist)	Damir (By 1st Duelist)	Gordan (By 1st Duelist)	Kristijan (By 1st Duelist)	Ankica (By 1st Duelist)	Ante (By 1st Duelist)	Gordan (By 1st Duelist)	Goran; Gordan	Josipa; Tomislav	Goran; Josipa
Evicted	Zinka; Lost duel	Lara; Lost duel	Senad; Lost duel	Damir; Lost duel	Sara; Lost duel	Ankica; Lost duel	Katica; Lost duel	Jasmina; Lost duel	Darko; Lost duel	Daniela; Lost duel	Barbara; Lost duel	Kristijan; Lost duel	Ankica; Lost duel	Ante; Lost duel	Damir; Lost duel	Gordan; Lost duel	Tomislav; Lost duel	Josipa; Lost duel
Evicted	Zinka; Lost duel	Lara; Lost duel	Senad; Lost duel	Damir; Lost duel	Sara; Lost duel	Ankica; Lost duel	Katica; Lost duel	Jasmina; Lost duel	Darko; Lost duel	Daniela; Lost duel	Barbara; Lost duel	Kristijan; Lost duel	Ankica; Lost duel	Ante; Lost duel	Damir; Lost duel	Gordan; Lost duel	Tomislav; Lost duel	Goran; Winner

=== Notes ===
- ^Note 1 : As reward for being a part of the winning the player is immune for the week.
- ^Note 2 : During the team phase of the game, the nominees from the winning team were spared eviction and gained immunty.
- ^Note 3 : Danijel felt that he would sustain a serious injury if he stayed on the farm so he decided to quit.
- ^Note 4 : After Senad's eviction, 2 new farmers, Igor & Dalia, were introduced to the rest of farmers. Dalia became a new member of the red team while Igor became the new member of the green team.
- ^Note 5 : Igor quit due to medical reasons.
- ^Note 6 : In Week 5 a team switch occurred. Josipa & Katica became new members of the red team, while Gordan & Ankica of the green team.
- ^Note 7 : Dalia became fed up with the living conditions and decided to quit the game.
- ^Note 8 : The nominee's team won the week challenge but is still eligible to be chosen as the second duelist.
- ^Note 9 : In Week 6 another team switch occurred. Jasmina became a member of the green team, while Barbara switched to the red team.
- ^Note 10 : In Week 9 the team's merged into one, the goleden team. Also two previously eliminated players, Ankica & Damir, were brought back in the game.
- ^Note 11 : In week 10 all contestants had to give their vote to Daniela, because Mia stated before the voting that Goran has an immunity.
- ^Note 12 : In the final week there was no selection process and final four players drew tournament duel matchups that would determinate the winner of the season. Goran was selected to compete against Gordan and Josipa was selected to compete against Tomislav. The winners of those two duels would face each other for the grand prize and the losers went home empty handed.Gordan lost the duel against Goran on Day 108 placing fourth overall and Tomislav lost the duel against Josipa on Day 109 placing third overall. Goran & Josipa faced each other later on Day 110 with Goran being crowned as the Season 5 winner.
