= Saša, Tin i Kedžo =

Croatian boy band

Saša, Tin i Kedžo was the first Croatian boy band, that is now disbanded. Its members were Saša Lozar, Tin Samardžić, and Damir Kedžo, all finalists of the Story Supernova Music Talents, reality show aired on Nova TV in late 2003.

The band was first mentioned late in the show's series, and was formed based on its members' popularity with the show's Croatian teen audience. All three were reportedly very unhappy about joining the band, but were contractually obliged. The band recorded one popular single, 365, then went on their only tour, on the Adriatic Coast in the summer of 2004. After 10 shows out of 29 scheduled, the tour was cancelled due to disagreements between the band and their managers.

Croatia Records published their album Instant in 2004, with thirteen songs written mostly by Boris Đurđević and Faruk Buljubašić. The album was panned by critics.

The band entered into the HRT Dora Eurosong pre-selection competition in February 2005.

Soon after the tour, the band's popularity decreased. The band members eventually parted company and the band ceased to exist.

== Members ==
=== Saša Lozar ===
Saša Lozar, born 12 February 1980, was one of the four contestants to compete for the grand prize in the last episode of the talent show - the others were Nera Stipičević, Natalie Dizdar and the eventual winner Rafael Dropulić. In 2007 he recorded his solo debut, an album named 1 dan, with ten songs of old-school soul.

=== Tin Samardžić ===
Tin Samardžić, born 1979, did not pursue a music career after the show or the band. In 2013, he was working as a hotel manager in Supetar.

=== Damir Kedžo ===
Damir Kedžo, born 24 May 1987 did pursue a music career, and in the summer of 2007 he won the local festival MIK (Melodije Istre i Kvarnera) and got the award for the best vocal act in the same festival. In 2008 he released an eponymous solo album. In 2011 he entered the national selection for the Eurovision Song Contest. He won the 2015 edition of New Wave.

On 23 December 2019, Kedžo was announced as one of the 16 participants in Dora 2020, the national contest in Croatia to select the country's Eurovision Song Contest 2020 entry, with the song "Divlji vjetre". He won the competition with a total of 31 points and was supposed to represent Croatia in Rotterdam. However, on March 18, 2020, the event was cancelled due to the Coronavirus outbreak.

== Discography ==
- 2004 - Instant
