= Ivan Hrvatska =

Croatian singer living in Canada

- Born: Dalmatia, Croatia
- Origin: Vancouver, British Columbia, Canada
- Genres: Dance, comedy rock
- Occupation(s): Singer-songwriter, entertainer
- Labels: Coconut Dreams Productions, Menart
- Website: ivanhrvatska.com

Ivan Hrvatska is a Croatian singer living in Canada, known for his songs about "making love" to national holidays of Canada and the United States. He first gained attention in 2001 with the song "First I Make Love to You, Then I Make Love to Christmas". Other tracks include "Making Love to the Grey Cup" and "Making Love to Vancouver Canucks".

His album Seasons of Love (Party All Year) charted on Canadian college album charts, including reaching #3 in Winnipeg.

In 2010 Ivan Hrvatska was in the Croatian reality TV show Farma on Nova TV.

== Discography ==
=== Albums ===
- Seasons of Love (Party All Year), iTunes release March 2006
- Hrvatski Party! (Translation: Croatian Party), iTunes release June 2008
- Vrijeme za Party (Translation: It is time for Party), iTunes release March 2009
- Muzika za Party (Translation: Music for the Party), iTunes release March 2010
