= Saša Lozar =

Croatian singer (born 1980)

- Born: 12 February 1980 (age 46); Laduč near Brdovec, SR Croatia, SFR Yugoslavia
- Genres: Pop
- Occupation: Singer
- Instrument: Vocals
- Years active: 2003–present
- Labels: Croatia Records, Agapa

Saša Lozar (born 12 February 1980) is a Croatian singer. Lozar rose to fame in 2003 after finishing as runner-up on the first season of Story Supernova Music Talents. In late 2003, Lozar formed the boy band Saša, Tin i Kedžo together with Damir Kedžo and Tin Samardžić. Lozar began to adopt a more mature image as an artist with the release of his debut solo album 1 Dan (2007).

== Early life ==
Lozar was born in Laduč near Brdovec, at the time in the Yugoslav republic of Croatia. He has a younger brother named Ivan. He attended the Tituš Brezovački Gymnasium and earned his high school diploma in 1998.

== Music career ==
Lozar's first musical appearance was in 1992 when he was a contestant on Hrvatska radiotelevizija's Turbo Limach Show. He made it to the finals where he lost to Renata Sabljak thus finishing as the runner-up.

In 2003, Lozar auditioned for the first and only season of Nova TV's talent show Story Supernova Music Talents by singing "Hero" and "Kad mi dođeš ti" by Oliver Dragojević. He later advanced to the live shows. Lozar was announced as the runner-up for the first season of Story Supernova Music Talents.

A year after, in January 2004, he became a part of the Croatian boy band "Saša, Tin i Kedžo" along with Damir Kedžo and Tin Samardžić. The band's debut album, titled Instant, sold 10,000 copies in its chart run, while their debut single "365" topped the Croatian charts for six weeks. In 2005 the band disbanded allowing Lozar and the other members to pursue solo projects.

On 29 May 2006, Lozar released his debut single "Na kraju dana". Lozar's debut album 1 dan was released on 30 June 2007 through Croatia Records.

On 7 September 2015, Lozar was announced to join the cast of the second season of television show Tvoje lice zvuči poznato (Your Face Sounds Familiar), in which celebrity contestants impersonate a different iconic music artist on stage each week. In the season finale that took place on 6 December 2015, he was declared winner.

He voiced Branch in the Croatian-language version of the commercially successful animated motion picture Trolls (2016).

Lozar was among the participants of Dora 2024, the Croatian selection for the Eurovision Song Contest 2024, with the song "Ne plačem zbog nje"; he advanced from his semi-final on 22 February 2024.

== Personal life ==
On 27 August 2005 Lozar married his long-time girlfriend Marija Bajs. In 2009 he announced via social media that Marija had given birth to their daughter, Eva.

== Discography ==
=== Studio albums ===
- 1 dan (2007)

=== Singles ===
Title	Year	Peak chart positions	Album
Title	Year	CRO	Album
"Žena sve vidi"	2013	18	Non-album singles
"Opčinjen"	2014	7	Non-album singles
"Nitko kao mi"	2014	2	Non-album singles
"Za nas dvoje"	2016	33	Non-album singles
"Tebi"	2017	13	Non-album singles
"Tajno"	2017	6	Non-album singles
"Da"	2018	3	Non-album singles
"Šala"	2018	7	Non-album singles
"Budi"	2019	2	Non-album singles
"Hej, Badnjak je"	2019	3	Non-album singles
"Dama"	2020	18	Non-album singles
"Vrijeme"	2020	6	Non-album singles
"Vrati se"	2021	5	Non-album singles
"Daleko od raja"	2021	4	Non-album singles
"Lagano na vrijeme"	2023	2	Non-album singles
"—" denotes releases that did not chart or were not released in that territory.
