= Farma (Croatian TV series) season 3 =

Farma
- Season 3
- Winner: Kristijan Kiki Rahimovski

Release
- Original network: Nova TV
- Original release: 21 March – 18 June 2010

Season chronology
- ← Previous; Season 2 Next → Season 4

The third season of Farma, a Croatian reality television series based on The Farm, started on 21 March 2010 and finished on 18 June 2010 (90 days). Nikolina Pišek and Mia Kovačić served as hosts with Davor Dretar Drele returning after a one-season break as a co-host. The winner Kristijan Kiki Rahimovski received 269.000 kuna from the prize.

== Contestants ==
Celebrity	Home	Occupation/Famous for...	Age
Angie Garany†	Zagreb	Actress	29
Antonio Marušić	Zagreb	Model & Actor	30
Ava Karabatić	Split	Model	18
Branka Marić Mutti	Zagreb	Model & Businesswoman	55
Daniel Popović	Podgorica	Singer	55
Elio Pisak	Buzet	Singer	57
Marinela "Ella" Jantoš	Osijek	Singer	39
Ivan Hrvatska	Vancouver	Singer	35
Ivo Amulić	Omiš	Singer	57
Jelena Bosančić	Split	Model	26
Josip Ivančić	Tomislavgrad	Singer	32
Kristijan "Kike" Curavić	Krapanj	Professional Scuba Diver	35
Kristijan "Kiki" Rahimovski	Zagreb	Singer	28
Maja Morales	Zagreb	Model & TV Personality	20
Nikol Bulat	Šibenik	Singer	22
Sabina Čedić	Zagreb	Model	23
Stjepan Božić	Brežice	Boxer	35
Žana Štrbac	Vinkovci	TV Host & Actress	25

=== Voting history ===
	Week 1	Week 2	Week 3	Week 4	Week 5	Week 6	Week 7	Week 8	Week 9	Week 10	Week 11	Week 12	Final	
Head of Farm (Immunity)	Ella	Daniel	Branka	Sabina	Ivan	Žana	Kiki	Jelena	Elio	Josip	Josip	Jelena	None	
Nominations	Antonio; ~~Maja~~; Jelena	Ella; Kiki	Daniel; Nikol	Ava; Ivan	Ivo; Nikol	Branka; Ivan	Angie; Stjepan	Angie; Stjepan	Antonio; Ava	Ava; Ivo	Antonio; Branka	Branka; Elio	none	
Public Favourite (Given Immunity)	Josip					Branka	Branka	Josip			Branka	None		
Kiki	Jelena	Nominated	Daniel	Ava	Nikol	Branka	Angie	Angie	Ava	Ava	Branka	Branka	Winner (Day 90)	
Josip	Jelena	Ella	Daniel	Ava	Nikol	Branka	Angie	Angie	Antonio	Ava	Branka	Branka	Runner-Up (Day 90)	
Ivo	Antonio	Ella	Daniel	Ava	Nominated	Ivan	Stjepan	Angie	Ava	Nominated	Branka	Branka	3rd Place (Day 90)	
Jelena	Nominated	Kiki	Daniel	Ava	Ivo	Branka	Stjepan	Stjepan	Ava	Ava	Branka	Branka	4th Place (Day 90)	
Sabina	Antonio	Kiki	Daniel	Ava	Ivo	Branka	Angie	Angie	Ava	Ivo	Branka	Branka	5th Place (Day 90)	
Branka	Antonio	Kiki	Daniel	Ava	Nikol	Nominated	Stjepan	Angie	Antonio	Ivo	Nominated	Nominated	Evicted (Day 83)	
Elio	Antonio	Ella	Daniel	Ava	Nikol	Branka	Stjepan	Angie	Antonio	Ava	Branka	Nominated	Evicted (Day 83)	
Antonio	Nominated	Evicted (Day 6)		Ivan	Nikol	Branka	Stjepan	Angie	Nominated	Ava	Nominated	Re-evicted (Day 76)		
Ava	Not in the Farm			Nominated	Evicted (Day 27)		Stjepan	Angie	Nominated	Nominated	Re-evicted (Day 69)			
Stjepan	Not in the Farm						Nominated	Nominated	Antonio	Evicted (Day 62)				
Angie	Not in the Farm						Nominated	Nominated	Evicted (Day 55)					
Žana	Antonio	Kiki	Daniel	Ava	Ivo	Branka	Stjepan	Evicted (Day 48)						
Ivan	Not in the Farm			Nominated	Nikol	Nominated	Evicted (Day 41)							
Nikol	Antonio	Kiki	Nominated	Ivan	Nominated	Evicted (Day 34)								
Maja	Walked (Day 5)				Re-evicted (Day 25)									
Kike	Antonio	Ella	Daniel	Ava	Walked (Day 25)									
Daniel	Antonio	Ella	Nominated	Evicted (Day 20)										
Ella	Antonio	Nominated	Evicted (Day 13)											
Walked	Maja	None		Kike	None									
1st Duelist (By Group)	Antonio; 9/11 votes	Ella; 5/10 votes	Daniel; 9/9 votes	Ava; 9/11 votes	Nikol; 6/9 votes	Ivan; 1/8 votes	Stjepan; 7/10 votes	Angie; 8/9 votes	Antonio; 4/8 votes	Ava; 5/7 votes	Antonio; 0/6 votes	Branka; 5/5 votes	None	
2nd Duelist (By 1st Duelist)	Elio	Žana	Elio	Žana	Žana	Kiki	Žana	Ava	Stjepan	Jelena	Kiki	Kiki; Ivo	None	
Evicted	Antonio; Lost duel	Ella; Lost duel	Daniel; Lost duel	Maja; Lost duel vs. Sabina (Leader)	Nikol; Lost duel	Ivan; Lost duel	Žana; Lost duel	Angie; Lost duel	Stjepan; Lost duel	Ava; Lost duel	Antonio; Lost duel	Elio; Lost duel vs. Kiki	Sabina; 1% (out of 5)	Jelena; 6% (out of 4)
Evicted	Antonio; Lost duel	Ella; Lost duel	Daniel; Lost duel	Maja; Lost duel vs. Sabina (Leader)	Nikol; Lost duel	Ivan; Lost duel	Žana; Lost duel	Angie; Lost duel	Stjepan; Lost duel	Ava; Lost duel	Antonio; Lost duel	Elio; Lost duel vs. Kiki	Ivo; 15% (out of 3)	Josip; 42% to win
Evicted	Antonio; Lost duel	Ella; Lost duel	Daniel; Lost duel	Ava; Lost duel	Nikol; Lost duel	Ivan; Lost duel	Žana; Lost duel	Angie; Lost duel	Stjepan; Lost duel	Ava; Lost duel	Antonio; Lost duel	Branka; Lost duel	Kiki; 58% to win	
