= Farma (Croatian TV series) season 2 =

Farma
- Season 2
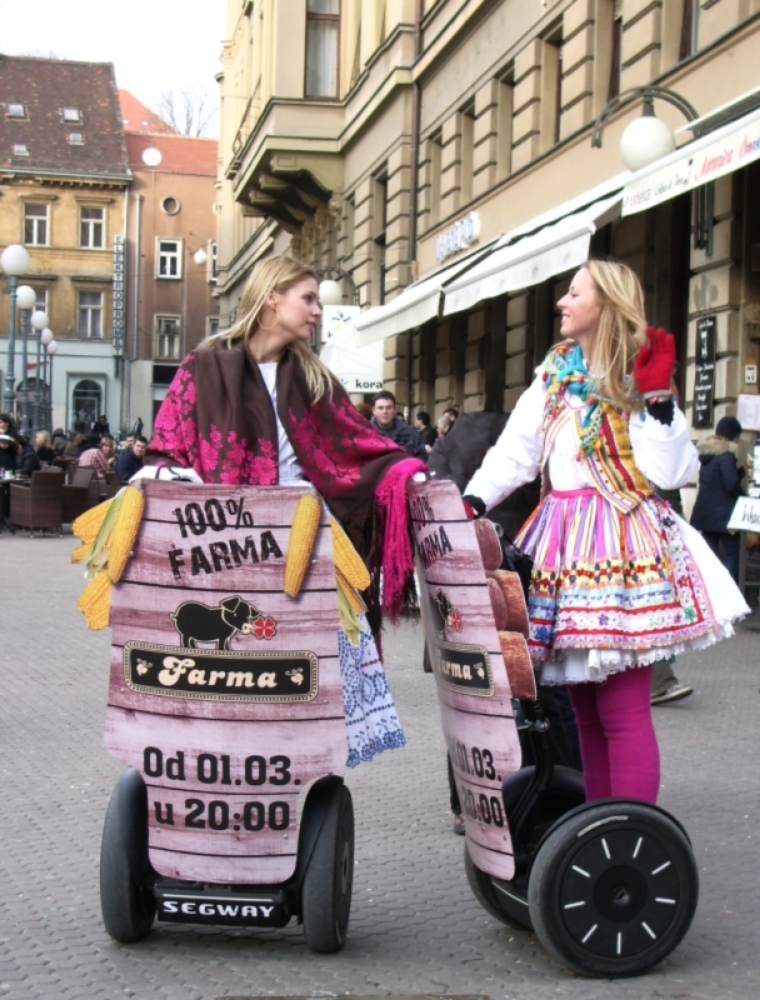
- Promotion for the second season of Farma in Zagreb
- Winner: Mario Mlinarić

Release
- Original network: Nova TV
- Original release: 1 March 2009

Season chronology
- ← Previous; Season 1 Next → Season 3

The second season of Farma, a Croatian reality television series based on The Farm, premiered on 1 March 2009 on Nova TV. The winner of the second season was Mario Mlinarić who won 324,000 kuna from the prize.

== Contestants ==
Celebrity	Home	Occupation/Notability	Age
Ante Gotovac	Zagreb	Businessman	40
Boris Jelinić	Zagreb	Model & Wrestler	20
Dino Bubičić	Zagreb	Model & Mister Croatia	26
Gianna Apostolski	Split	Singer	32
Ivana Paris	Pazin	Miss Universe	25
Jurica Pađen	Zagreb	Musician	54
Marija Štrajh	Zagreb	TV Host	37
Marina Perazić	Rijeka	Singer	51
Mario Mlinarić	Bjelovar	Model, Actor & TV Host	29
Petra Maroja	Zadar	Model & Actress	26
Pjer Žardin	Zagreb	Actor & TV host	53
Renato "Rennman" Đošić	Zagreb	Hip Hop veteran	
Seid "Vajta" Memić	Travnik	Singer	59
Simona Gotovac	Zagreb	Model	25
Sonja Kovač	Zagreb	Model & Actress	25
Stjepan "Gego" Barišić	Hvar	Singer	
Tanja Jovanović	Dubrovnik	Big Brother 3 housemate	23

=== Voting history ===
	Week 1	Week 2	Week 3	Week 4	Week 5	Week 6	Week 7	Week 8	Week 9	Week 10	Week 11	Week 12	Week 13	Final	
Head of Farm	Ivana	Simona	Dino	Boris	Vajta	Sonja	Jurica	Petra	Mario	Simona	Dino	Simona	Mario	none	
Nominations	Vajta; Marija	Pjer; Sonja	Gego; Simona	Vajta; Marija	Sonja; Dino	Vajta; Jurica	Marina; Sonja	Marina; Jurica	Ivana; Marina	Sonja; Mario	Simona; Gianna	Petra; Dino	Ivana; Simona	none	
Mario			Gego			Vajta	Marina	Jurica		Nominated		Petra		Winner (Day 97)	
Dino			Gego			Vajta	Marina	Jurica		Mario		Nominated		Runner-Up (Day 97)	
Ivana			Simona			Vajta	Marina	Jurica		Sonja		Dino		Third Place (Day 97)	
Petra			Gego			Vajta	Marina	Jurica		Sonja		Nominated		Ejected (Day 92)	
Simona			Nominated			Evicted (Day 34)		Marina		Sonja		Dino		Evicted (Day 90)	
Sonja			Gego			Vajta	Nominated	Jurica		Nominated		Petra	Evicted (Day 83)		
Gianna	Not in The Farm					Vajta	Marina	Jurica		Sonja		Evicted (Day 76)			
Marina			Simona			Vajta	Nominated	Nominated		Sonja	Evicted (Day 69)				
Ante		Evicted (Day 6)						Jurica		Evicted (Day 62)					
Jurica	Not in The Farm					Nominated	Sonja	Nominated	Evicted (Day 55)						
Boris	Not in The Farm					Vajta	Marina	Evicted (Day 48)							
Vajta			Gego			Nominated	Evicted (Day 41)								
Marija			Gego		Evicted (Day 27)										
Renman			Gego	Walked (Day 24)											
Gego			Nominated	Ejected (Day 19)											
Pjer			Evicted (Day 13)												
Tanja			Walked (Day 10)												
Walked	none	Tanja	none	Renman	none										
Ejected	none		Gego	none										Petra	
1st Duelist (By Group)	Marija / votes	Pjer / votes	Gego; 7/9 votes	Marija / votes	Sonja / votes	Vajta; 8/8 votes	Marina; 6/7 votes	Jurica; 7/ 8 votes	Marina / votes	Sonja; 5/6 votes	Simona / votes	Dino; 2/4 votes	Simona / votes	none	
2nd Duelist (1st Duelist)	Ante (By 1st Duelist)	Ivana (By 1st Duelist)	Mario (By 1st Duelist)	Vajta (By 1st Duelist)	Simona (By 1st Duelist)	Mario (By 1st Duelist)	Boris (By 1st Duelist)	Gianna (By 1st Duelist)	Ante (By 1st Duelist)	Marina (By 1st Duelist)	Gianna (By 1st Duelist)	Sonja (By 1st Duelist)	Dino (By 1st Duelist)	none	
Evicted	Ante; Lost duel	Pjer; Lost duel	Eviction; Cancelled	Marija; Lost duel	Simona; Lost duel	Vajta; Lost duel	Boris; Lost duel	Jurica; Lost duel	Ante; Lost duel	Marina; Lost duel	Gianna; Lost duel	Sonja; Lost duel	Simona; Lost duel	Ivana % to win	
Evicted	Ante; Lost duel	Pjer; Lost duel	Eviction; Cancelled	Marija; Lost duel	Simona; Lost duel	Vajta; Lost duel	Boris; Lost duel	Jurica; Lost duel	Ante; Lost duel	Marina; Lost duel	Gianna; Lost duel	Sonja; Lost duel	Simona; Lost duel	Dino % to win	Mario % to win
