= Damir Kedžo =

Croatian pop and pop-folk singer (born 1987)

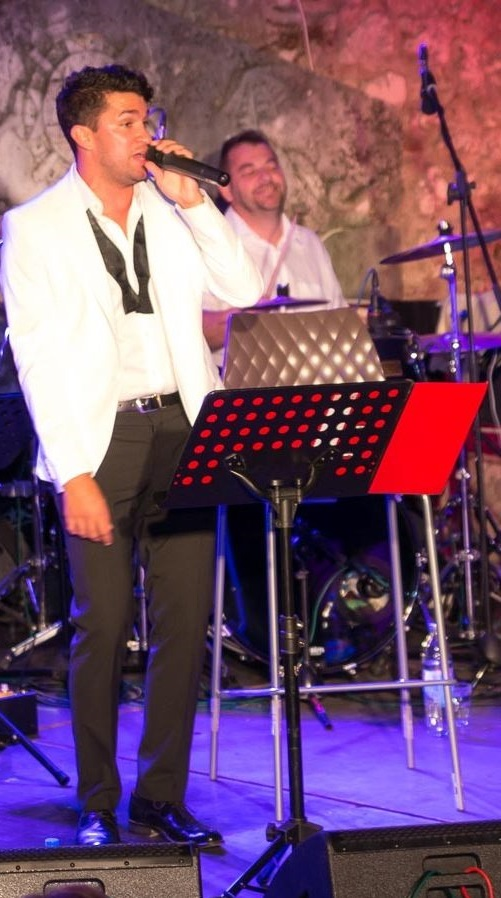
- Kedžo performing at the closing ceremony of tenth Ljeto na Gradini (2016)
- Born: 24 May 1987 (age 39); Omišalj, SR Croatia, SFR Yugoslavia
- Occupation: Singer
- Musical career
- Genres: Pop; pop-folk
- Instrument: Vocals
- Years active: 2003–present
- Labels: Croatia Records (2003–2007, 2018–present); Menart (2007–2015); Hit Records (2014–2017)

Damir Kedžo (born 24 May 1987) is a Croatian pop singer. While he started his career in 2003 by participating in Story Supernova Music Talents, he became even more famous in Croatia after winning the third season of Tvoje lice zvuči poznato, the Croatian version of Your Face Sounds Familiar. He also performed in musicals.

== Life and career ==
=== 1987–2002: Early life and education ===
Kedžo was born on 24 May 1987 in Omišalj, where he finished musical school, and was singing in a church choir. When he was a child, besides singing, he wanted to be a gynecologist, but he gave up on that idea when signed up for the Story Super Nova Music Talent Show. Damir had a jaw surgery, because he could not speak or eat normally, and he had problems with pronunciation of words, which was important for the profession he chose. After the surgery, he could not speak for a month, and the complete recovery took him three months, when he could chew normally again. He admitted that, after the surgery, he became a stronger person, and more confident in himself and his decisions.

=== 2003–2005: Story Supernova Music Talents and Saša, Tin i Kedžo ===
In 2003, Kedžo auditioned for the first and only season of Nova TV's talent show Story Supernova Music Talents, where he excited the audience and the jury with his personality and attitude and his song interpretations which took him into the top 7. He was 16 at the time when he decided to compete in one of the most famous Croatian TV shows.

A year after, in January 2004, he became a part of the Croatian boy band "Saša, Tin i Kedžo" along with Saša Lozar (winner of the second season of Tvoje lice zvuči poznato) and Tin Samardžić. The band's debut album, titled Instant, sold 10,000 copies in its chart run, while their debut single "365" topped the Croatian charts for six weeks. In 2005 the band disbanded and Kedžo took a year off in his career.

=== 2006–2009: Melodije Istre i Kvarnera and debut album ===
After he won an award at Melodije Istre i Kvarnera (MIK) for the best debuting artist with the song "Ki bi sad reke" in 2006 and the award for the best interpretation for the song "Kanet na vetru" in 2007, he has seen his path in pop songs with elements of Italian canzone. That was visible in his song "Odlučio sam otići".

=== 2010–2014: Slavianski Bazaar, Dora 2011 and musicals ===
Damir has also appeared in Croatian performance of musical “Joseph and the Amazing Technicolor Dreamcoat” in double role, Benjamin and Potiphar. He had a great start in his acting career, he got awarded for great successes of young artists in operetta and musicals for the role of Hudi in musical "Crna kuća".

He debuted in 2006 on MIK with the song “Ki bi sad reke” and won the best debuting artist award. In 2007, on MIK, he won the award for the best interpretation with the song “Kanet na vetru” and the first place of the juries. In 2008 he published his debuting album with his most popular songs “Sjećam se”, “Idem” and “Kažnjen u duši”. A year later on MIK, he won the second place of the jury and third place of the audience with the song “Peza od zlata”. In 2010 on the international festival Slavianski Bazaar in Vitebsk, Belarus, he won the Grand Prix.

In 2011, Kedžo applied for Dora 2011, Croatian national selection for the Eurovision Song Contest 2011. In 2012, he won the best interpretation award on MIK with the song “Daj mi kapju vodi” and the first place of the juries. 2014 was a very successful year for Damir, he already sold two concerts in HKD Sušak.

=== 2015–2019: Tvoje lice zvuči poznato and continued success ===
In 2015 he won on a Russian festival "New Wave". Since then, he started working on his songs in English. In 2016 Kedžo had one of his biggest concerts on International Women's Day in front of 3,500 people in Zamet Hall, Rijeka.

In December 2016, Kedžo won the third season of Tvoje lice zvuči poznato, the most watched Croatian TV show. After a wide spectre of enjoyed performances (Maurice White of Earth, Wind & Fire, Britney Spears, Petar Grašo, Doris Dragović), he claimed the victory of the show as Mariah Carey. In January 2019, Kedžo won Zagrebfest with the song "Srce mi umire za njom".

=== 2020–present: Eurovision Song Contest 2020 ===
On 23 December 2019, Kedžo was announced as one of the 16 participants in Dora 2020, the national contest in Croatia to select the country's Eurovision Song Contest 2020 entry, with the song "Divlji vjetre". He won the competition with a total of 31 points and was supposed to represent Croatia in Rotterdam. However, the event was cancelled due to the COVID-19 pandemic. He later was denied the opportunity to represent Croatia in the 2021 contest.

Kedžo was one of the 18 acts to perform in Dora 2023, which was held on 11 February 2023. He performed the song "Angels and Demons", and placed fifth.

Kedžo was again included in the 24 participants of Dora 2024, with the song "Voljena ženo"; he advanced from his semi-final on 23 February 2024. but placed 4th on the final evening.

== Personal life ==
Kedžo has borderline personality disorder.

== Discography ==
=== Studio albums ===
Title	Details	Peak chart positions
Title	Details	CRO
Damir Kedžo	Released: 1 June 2008; Label: Menart Records; Formats: CD, digital download	*
Poljubi me sad	Released: 23 July 2020; Label: Croatia Records; Formats: CD, digital download	1
Tajna mojih pobjeda	Released: 2 August 2024; Label: Croatia Records; Formats: CD, digital download	3

=== Singles ===
Title	Year	Peak chart positions	Album
Title	Year	CRO	Album
"Ki bi sad reke"	2006	—	Non-album singles
"Kanet na vetru"	2007	—	Damir Kedžo
"Sjećam se"	2008	—	Damir Kedžo
"Idem"	2008	—	Damir Kedžo
"Kažnjen u duši"	2008	—	Damir Kedžo
"Peza od zlata"	2009	—	Non-album singles
"Daj mi kapju vodi"	2012	—	Non-album singles
"Da se more smiluje"	2014	9	Non-album singles
"Kad ljubav stisne zube"	2015	6	Non-album singles
"Tebi sam sve oprostio"	2015	33	Non-album singles
"Korijen u pijesku"	2016	3	Poljubi me sad
"Ronim na dah"	2016	24	Poljubi me sad
"Sve u meni se budi" (with Zsa Zsa)	2017	1	Poljubi me sad
"Ljubavi moja"	2017	9	Poljubi me sad
"Vojnik ljubavi"	2018	2	Poljubi me sad
"Ne mogu iz dana u noć" (with Medea Sindik)	2018	21	Non-album singles
"Mi protiv nas" (with Domenica Žuvela)	2018	2	Ćiribu ćiriba
"Šuti"	2018	3	Poljubi me sad
"Srce mi umire za njom"	2019	4	Poljubi me sad
"Vidi se izdaleka"	2019	1	Poljubi me sad
"Poljubi me sad"	2019	1	Poljubi me sad
"Divlji vjetre"	2020	1	Poljubi me sad
"Nedodirljiva"	2020	3	Poljubi me sad
"Sjeti se"	2020	2	Tajna mojih pobjeda
"Hram" (with Tijana Bogićević)	2021	17	Tajna mojih pobjeda
"U nama"	2021	11	Tajna mojih pobjeda
"Vatra i led"	2021	12	Tajna mojih pobjeda
"Kad ljubav"	2021	3	Tajna mojih pobjeda
"Izbor je tvoj"	2022	8	Tajna mojih pobjeda
"Angels and Demons"	2023	8	Tajna mojih pobjeda
"Zbog tvojih pogleda"	2023	21	Tajna mojih pobjeda
"Moje srce je"	2023	22	Tajna mojih pobjeda
"Sreća to je kada te imam"	2023	—	Tajna mojih pobjeda
"Voljena ženo"	2024	3	Tajna mojih pobjeda
"Tajna mojih pobjeda"	2024	—	Tajna mojih pobjeda
"—" denotes releases that did not chart or were not released in that territory.

== Awards and nominations ==
Year	Association	Category	Nominee / work	Result	Ref.
2018	Cesarica	Song of the Year	"Mi protiv nas" (with Domenica Žuvela)	Nominated	
2019	Cesarica	Song of the Year	"Srce mi umire za njom"	Nominated	
2019	Cesarica	Song of the Year	"Vidi se izdaleka"	Nominated	
2020	Porin	Best Male Vocal Performance	"Srce mi umire za njom"	Nominated	

Achievements
Preceded by Roko Blažević with "The Dream"	Croatia in the Eurovision Song Contest; 2020 (cancelled)	Succeeded by Albina with "Tick-Tock"
