= Farma (Croatian TV series) =

- RTL's logo for the series
- Genre: Reality competition
- Based on: The Farm by Strix
- Presented by: Mia Kovačić (s. 1–7); Davor Dretar (s. 1, 3, 6); Dražen Kocijan (s. 2); Dušan Bućan (s. 4–5); Nikolina Pišek (s. 2–3, 8); Frano Ridjan (s. 7)
- Country of origin: Croatia
- Original language: Croatian
- No. of seasons: 8

Production
- Executive producer: Miloš Ratković (s. 8)
- Producer: Marija Kuljanin (s. 8)
- Production locations: near Zagreb, Croatia (s. 1–6); Dalmatia (s. 7); Lopata, Slovenia (s. 8)
- Running time: 60 minutes
- Production company: Videostroj (s. 8)

Original release
- Network: Nova TV
- Release: 9 March 2008 – 30 December 2020
- Network: Voyo
- Release: 19 May – 22 August 2025

Farma (English: The Farm) is a Croatian reality television series based on the Swedish format of The Farm. The series follows a group of participants living on a farm and competing for a cash prize in an elimination-based format.

Farma debuted on Nova TV on 9 March 2008 as the first HDTV program to be broadcast in Croatia. The series concluded its run on Nova TV on 30 December 2020 with the finale of the seventh season.

In May 2024, RTL announced a revival of Farma, which premiered on 19 May 2025 on RTL's streaming service Voyo.

== Production ==
=== Format ===
A group of contestant is placed on a rural farm where they have to live in an isolation. Contestants leave the farm via eliminations; the winner ultimately receives a monetary prize.

=== Hosts ===
On Nova TV, Mia Kovačić hosted all seasons but the second, with various co-hosts joining her throughout the years.

Hosts and co-hosts on Farma
Host	Season							
Host	1	2	3	4	5	6	7	8
Mia Kovačić	Main		Main					
Davor Dretar	Main		Main			Main		
Dražen Kocijan		Main						
Nikolina Pišek		Main						Main
Dušan Bućan				Main				
Frano Ridjan							Main	

== Series overview ==
Season	Originally released		Network	Winner
Season	First released	Last released	Network	Winner
1	9 March 2008	6 June 2008	Nova TV	Rafael Dropulić
2	1 March 2009	2009	Nova TV	Mario Mlinarić
3	21 March 2010	18 June 2010	Nova TV	Kristijan Kiki Rahimovski
Novi početak	6 September 2015	19 December 2015	Nova TV	Blaženka Slamar
Dvije Farme	4 September 2016	23 December 2016	Nova TV	Goran Kaleb
6	16 September 2018	17 December 2018	Nova TV	Saša Vujnović
More i Maslina	5 October 2020	30 December 2020	Nova TV	Tomislav Pavlović
8	19 May 2025	22 August 2025	Voyo; RTL	Ivan Rogić

=== Seasons 1–3 (2008-2010): Celebrity edition ===
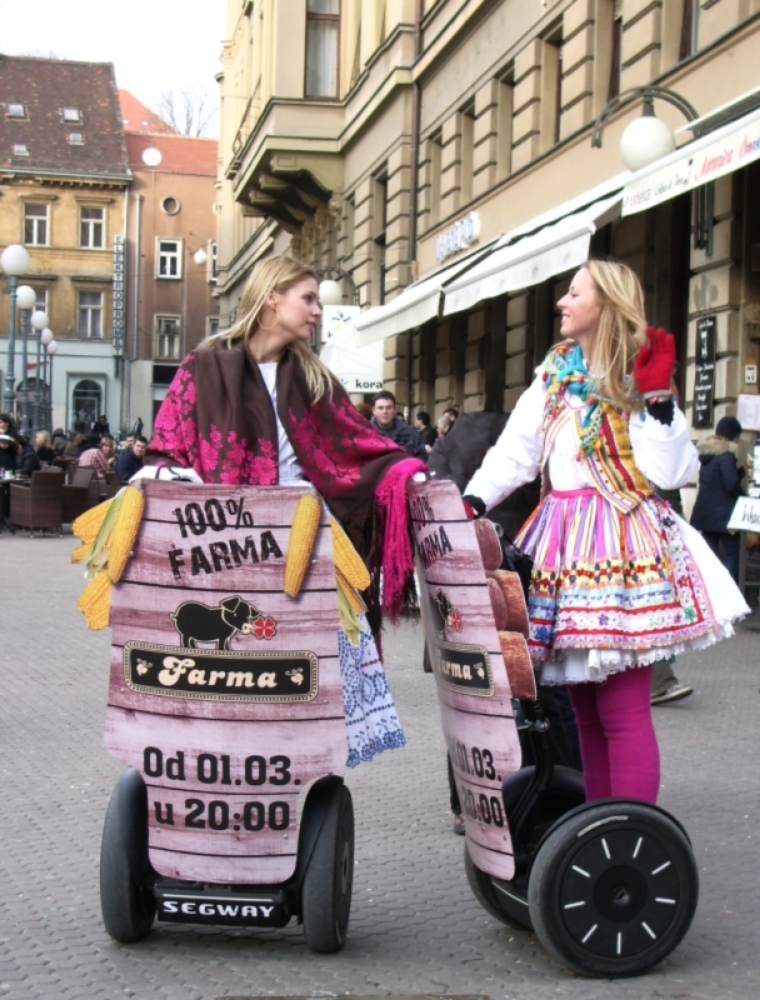
Promotion for the second season of Farma

The first three seasons ran on Nova TV from 2008 to 2010 and utilized a celebrity format; the contestants were notable television, media and other personalities. The winners of the first three seasons were Rafael Dropulić, Mario Mlinarić and Kristijan Kiki Rahimovski respectively.

=== Seasons 4–7 (2015–2020) ===
After a hiatus, the series returned to Nova TV in September 2015. Unlike in the previous three seasons, the contestant were not celebrities. The fourth season was titled Novi početak (English: New Beginning), and the fifth season, debuting in September 2016, was titled Dvije Farme (English: Two Farms) with contestants being placed on two different farms. A sixth season followed two years later, premiering in September 2018.

After another two-year hiatus, the seventh season aired on Nova TV under the title Farma: More i Maslina (English: Farma: The Sea and the Olive) from October to December 2020. The winner of More i Maslina was Tomislav Pavlović.

=== Season 8 (2025): RTL revival ===
In May 2024, RTL announced a revival of the series. The applications for aspiring participants to apply were opened the same month. A cash prize of €50,000 will be offered to the winner. RTL confirmed that the season will feature 19 contestants and was filmed in Slovenia. The season is hosted by Nikolina Pišek. The season premiered on 19 May 2025 on RTL's streaming service Voyo. RTL began airing the season one week later, on 26 May 2025. The season concluded on Voyo on 22 August 2025.

== Reception ==
=== Ratings ===
During its first two seasons, the series was broadcast in prime time for 13 weeks, six days in a week, and was the highest rated show of the season.

According to Nova TV, the fifth season, broadcast from September to December 2016, had an average of 570,000 viewers.
