= Poznanovec =

Coordinates: 46°04′N 16°02′E

- Village
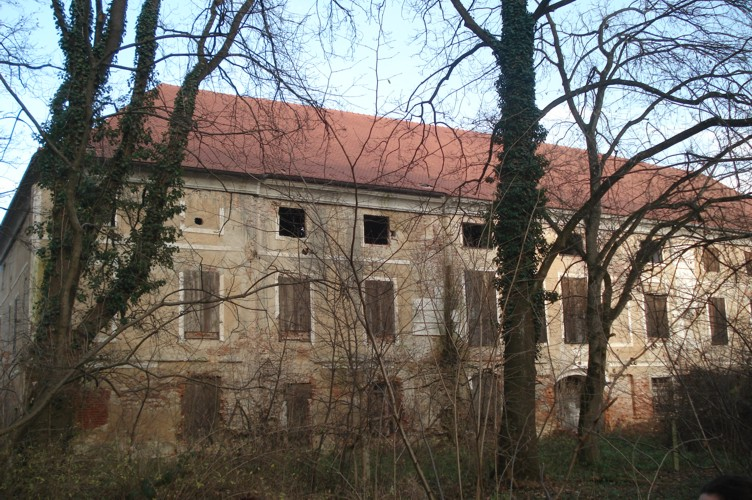
- Facade of the Poznanovec manor
- Interactive map of Poznanovec
- Country: Croatia
- County: Krapina-Zagorje County

Area
  - Total: 6.0 km^{2} (2.3 sq mi)

Population (2021)
  - Total: 887
  - Density: 150/km^{2} (380/sq mi)
- Time zone: UTC+1 (CET)
  - Summer (DST): UTC+2 (CEST)

Poznanovec is a village in the municipality Bedekovčina in Croatia. It is connected by the D24 highway and R201 railway.
