= Daleka obala =

Croatian rock band

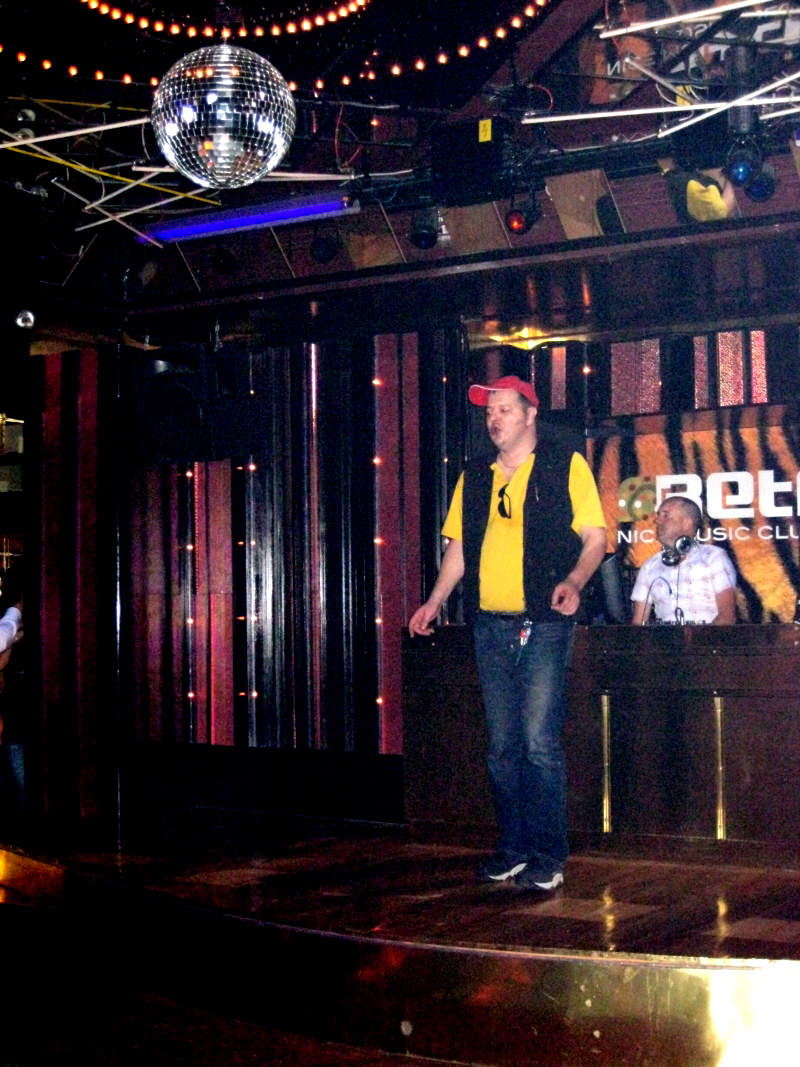
Marijan Ban

Daleka obala (trans. Faraway Coast) was a Croatian rock band based in Split, active between 1985 and 2002. The band was composed of Marijan Ban, Jadran Vušković, Boris Hrepić, Bogašin Šoić Mirilović and Zoran Ukić. Two members of the band have gone on to form "The Obala", which has recorded 2 CDs to date.

Most songs have been written by vocalist Marijan Ban, with exceptions, such as Kurve and Osamdesete which were written by pianist and guitarist Bogašin Šoić Mirilović. Ban's abstract range of topics had been an influence on Croatian songwriting. Bogašin Šoić Mirilović died on 21 June 2018.

== Discography ==
1. Daleka obala (1990)
2. Ludi mornari dolaze u grad (1992)
3. Mrlje (1993)
4. Morski pas (1994)
5. Di si ti (1997)
6. Od mora do mora (1998)
7. 1999-2000 (1999)
8. Uspomena (Sve najbolje uživo) (2002) (live album)
