= Tintilinić =

Figure in Croatian folklore

Tintilinić (alternatively Pimpilić, Tintilin or Malik) is a figure in Croatian folklore. He is typically described as a demon child wearing a red cap, soul of an unbaptised child which strolls through houses at night.

The legend is typically recorded on the Croatian coast, as well as among Burgenland Croats in Austria. The folk character has been popularized by Ivana Brlić-Mažuranić in her Tales of Long Ago, published in 1916.
