= Boris Banović =

Croatian fashion designer and luxury clothing brand

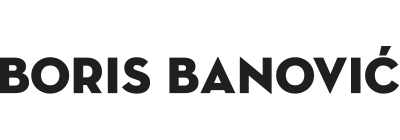
- Company type: Private
- Industry: Fashion
- Founder: Boris Banović
- Headquarters: Zagreb, Croatia
- Key people: Boris Banović, president & founder
- Products: Clothing and Accessories
- Website: www.borisbanovic.com

Boris Banović is a Croatian fashion designer and luxury clothing brand operating out of Zagreb, Croatia. The brand specializes in high-end, tailor-made clothing for men and women in an urban business style.

== Designer ==
Boris Banović (10 May 1973, Zagreb) is a Croatian fashion designer and TV personnel, also known by the name Fashion Guru. He is also a TV host, critic, columnist, fashion editor, book writer, announcer, guest on various fashion shows, TV presenter, and member of the Showtime jury (Croatian version of American Idol). Banović was born in Zagreb, Croatia, where he finished the Faculty of Textile Technology and got his college degree. Ambitious and determined to succeed as a designer, Banović went to London for further education in interior design. He began his career as a fashion buyer, fashion editor, columnist, TV person and book writer and was known as Fashion guru. His book, “Vodič za urbane frajere”, is a guide book aimed at urban men, who are not burdened with the idea that they must be supermen, about rules of social conduct and it is first of its kind in Croatia. Now, after years of hard work, Banović is a successful fashion designer and opened his own fashion shop.

== Clothing lines ==
His desire has always been to have his own fashion brand. After he started his own TV show and proved himself as a fashion buyer, he launched his company and his first autumn collection in spring 2007.

=== Boris Banović ===
It is a brand for urban business men and women who want to look serious and classic, yet modern. His 5 collections are in line with classic, tailor made design. His fashion is a combination of sporty and classic. The purchase is possible in stores (Zagreb, Dubrovnik and Rijeka) and through other distribution channels, such as online shops or some concept shops.

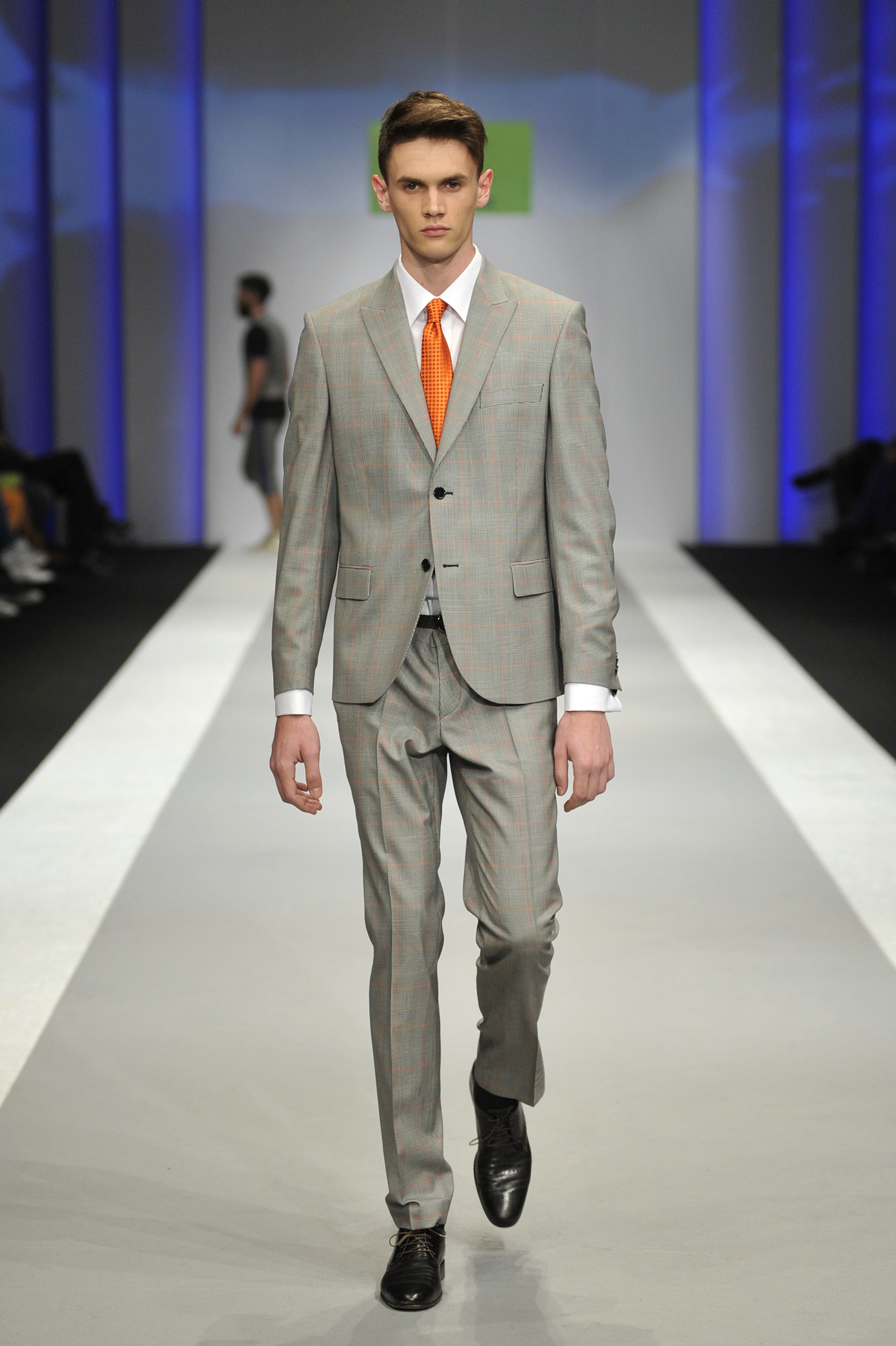
Boris Banović collection

=== Boris Banović 2014 ===
In 2014, Banović designed high fashion clothes for both men and women. The 2014 collection is inspired by retro Russian gangster style with black, blue and white as predominant colors.

=== 2B Design ===
This is an everyday casual, sporty, more relaxed line of clothing for both men and women. His summer 2014 is his Signature Line for Ultra Europe, the world-famous music festival. It is a wild, trendy, colorful look for young EDM fans and enthusiasts.

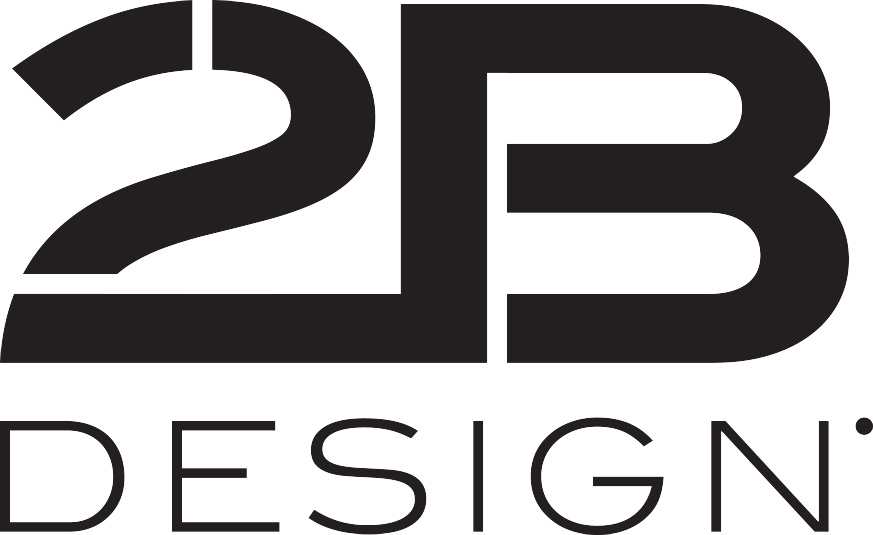
2B Design

== Fashion Guru ==
Fashion Guru is Banović's alias under which he wrote numerous columns, fashion critics and reviews. He started working for tportal in 2004, and by 2005, he got his own column, Stars. In 2006, as a part of TV show, Red Carpet, he hosted a 20-minute TV report about fashion and fashion shows, stars, new trends and lifestyle.
