= Ivana Kindl =

Croatian singer (born 1978)

- Born: Ivana Kindl; January 18, 1978 (age 48); Požega, SR Croatia, SFR Yugoslavia (now Croatia)
- Genres: Pop, R&B
- Occupations: Singer; songwriter
- Instrument: Vocals
- Years active: 2002–present
- Labels: Menart; Universal Music Croatia

Ivana Kindl (born 18 January 1978) is a Croatian singer.

== Career ==
In 2010, she was awarded the Porin for best album in the spiritual music category. The same year she won the best female singer award from the editors of Croatian Radio stations. In 2011, she won the Porin for best female vocal performance.

The song "Sve istine i laži" was released as a single on 6 October 2017.

Kindl participated in several seasons of the singing reality television series Zvijezde pjevaju as a professional partner to non-singer celebrities. She won the second season with Nikša Kušelj the and thirteenth season with Igor Barberić.

== Discography ==
=== Albums ===
- Trenutak istine (2002)
- Moj svijet (2004)
- Osjećaj (2006)
- Gospel u Komediji (2008)
- Promjenjiva (2010)

=== Singles ===
Title	Year	Peak chart positions	Album
Title	Year	CRO	Album
"Bond"	2021	22	Non-album single
