= Dolores Lambaša =

Croatian actress (1981–2013)

- Born: 29 March 1981; Šibenik, SR Croatia, Yugoslavia
- Died: 23 October 2013 (aged 32); Slavonski Brod, Croatia
- Years active: 2006–2013
- Partner(s): Ivo Gregurević (2002–2007)

Dolores Lambaša (29 March 1981 − 23 October 2013) was a Croatian actress.

Lambaša died of injuries sustained in a traffic collision on 23 October 2013, at the age of 32, at the Dr. Josip Benčević Hospital in Slavonski Brod.

== Filmography ==
=== Television roles ===
Film
Year	Title	Role	Notes
2006	Odmori se, zaslužio si	Ruža (in dream)	Role in one episode (Ruža dreams herself when she was young)
2007–2008	Dobre namjere	Željka Ljubas	
2008	Zauvijek susjedi	Herself	1 episode
2010	Najbolje godine	Željka Ljubas	
2012–2013	Ruža vjetrova	Tamara Marin	

=== Film roles ===
Film
Year	Title	Role	Notes
2007	Pravo čudo	President's wife	TV-film
2009	Vjerujem u anđele	Dea	Main role in Croatian romantic film
2010	Tumor	Lena Brajković	TV-film

=== Theatre roles ===
- Federico García Lorca: Bernarda Alba's home, as HNK Zagreb (2006)
