= Opća opasnost =

Croatian rock band

Opća Opasnost
- Origin: Županja, Croatia
- Genres: Rock
- Years active: 1992–present
- Label: Croatia Records
- Members: Igor Kolić; Vlado Soljačić; Josip Kamenski; Zoran Mišić; Nenad Dujmić
- Past members: Slaven Živanović; Pero Galić; Silvio Soljačić; Ivan Nol; Eugen Nemet; Ranko Šlibar; Branimir Jovanovac

Opća opasnost (lit. "General danger") is a rock band from Croatia known for rock ballads.

Founded by Slaven Živanović and Pero Galić in Županja in 1992, they grew to six members and released their first studio album in 1994, Treba mi nešto jače od sna, for Euroton records, a Croatian indie label. The songs "Opća opasnost", "Treba mi nešto jače od sna" and "Jednom kad noć" did very well on Croatian top lists at the time, and the latter became their signature song and one of the greatest ballads of ex-Yugoslav rock. They released another album, Amerika, for another local indie label, before signing on to Croatia Records for their 1997 album Ruski rulet.

They went on a hiatus in 2001, but returned in 2008 as a supporting band for a Whitesnake show in Osijek, as well as for Uriah Heep in 2009. In 2011, they performed as an opening act before Bon Jovi. Croatia Records released their 2011 album Vrati se na svjetlo, as well as a number of compilation records. The song "Tvoje ime čuvam" from this album received the Porin music award for hit of the year 2012.
