= Natali Dizdar =

Croatian pop singer

- Born: Natali Dizdar; August 27, 1984 (age 41); Zadar, SR Croatia, Yugoslavia
- Origin: Sukošan, Croatia
- Genres: R&B; pop
- Occupations: Singer; songwriter
- Instruments: Vocals; guitar; piano
- Years active: 2003–present
- Labels: Croatia Records; Agapa

Natali Dizdar (born 24 August 1984), also known as Natalie Dizdar, is a Croatian pop singer.

== Life and career ==
=== Early life ===
Dizdar was born in Zadar and raised in Sukošan, and attended music school in her youth.

=== Career ===
She became famous by becoming the runner-up of the Story Supernova Music Talents reality show, aired on Nova TV in late 2003. Endowed with an indisputable vocal talent, after the show she pursued a solo career, signed a contract with Croatia Records, trying to build a repertoire based on pop-jazz and other more worldly elements of popular music. Her first single, Ne daj, was entered into the 2004 Split Festival and soon became a radio hit. She collaborated with Matija Dedić, Arsen Dedić and Coco Mosquito on her first few albums. Her self-titled debut album was released in 2005 and was certified gold in Croatia.

In July 2013, "Grijeh" was released as a single and indicated the start of Dizdar's third album cycle. Dizdar wouldn't release another single until more than a year after when "Iluzionist" was released in December 2014. In 2016 she released two additional singles, "Ne reci zauvijek" and "Mjesto za jedno", with an announced that her third studio album would be released the following year. On 16 June 2017, Dizdar released her third studio album Iluzije through Agapa which finalized the recording deal with that label. The same day, the final single from the album "Nećeš me, zar ne", alongside its English language version "Pills", was released.

== Personal life ==
In 2011 Dizdar graduated from the Faculty of Education and Rehabilitation Sciences, University of Zagreb.

== Discography ==
=== Studio albums ===
Title	Details	Peak chart positions
Title	Details	CRO
Natali Dizdar	Released: 19 May 2005; Label: Croatia Records; Formats: CD, digital download, streaming	4
Pronađi put	Released: 18 March 2009; Label: Agapa; Formats: CD, digital download, streaming	1
Iluzije	Released: 16 June 2017; Label: Agapa; Formats: Digital download, streaming	7
Zadnji dan ljeta	Released: 22 September 2024; Label: Aquarius Records; Formats: CD, digital download, streaming	2

=== Live albums ===
Title	Details	Peak chart positions
Title	Details	CRO
ZKM Live	Released: 23 July 2012; Label: Agapa; Formats: Digital download, streaming	19

=== Singles ===
Title	Year	Peak chart positions	Album
Title	Year	CRO	Album
"Ne daj"	2004	(Note: HR Top 40 was launched on 24 January 2013.)	Natali Dizdar
"Gazio si me"	2005	(Note: HR Top 40 was launched on 24 January 2013.)	Natali Dizdar
"Svaki put"	2005	(Note: HR Top 40 was launched on 24 January 2013.)	Natali Dizdar
"Zamijenit ću te gorim"	2005	(Note: HR Top 40 was launched on 24 January 2013.)	Natali Dizdar
"Istina"	2006	(Note: HR Top 40 was launched on 24 January 2013.)	Natali Dizdar
"Naučila sam trik"	2007	(Note: HR Top 40 was launched on 24 January 2013.)	Pronađi put
"Stop"	2008	(Note: HR Top 40 was launched on 24 January 2013.)	Pronađi put
"Stranac"	2009	(Note: HR Top 40 was launched on 24 January 2013.)	Pronađi put
"Ne pitaj"	2009	(Note: HR Top 40 was launched on 24 January 2013.)	Pronađi put
"Mjesecu je dosadno"	2010	(Note: HR Top 40 was launched on 24 January 2013.)	Pronađi put
"Zašto bih ti rekla to"	2010	(Note: HR Top 40 was launched on 24 January 2013.)	Pronađi put
"Ovaj ples dame biraju"	2012	(Note: HR Top 40 was launched on 24 January 2013.)	ZKM Live
"Osloni se na mene"	2012	(Note: HR Top 40 was launched on 24 January 2013.)	ZKM Live
"Grijeh"	2013	2	Iluzije
"Iluzionist"	2014	4	Iluzije
"Ne reci zauvijek"	2016	8	Iluzije
"Mjesto za jedno"	2016	4	Iluzije
"Nećeš me, zar ne"	2017	— (Note: "Nećeš me, zar ne" did not enter the HR Top 40, but peaked at number 23 on the regional HR Top 100 (Dalmacija) chart.)	Iluzije
"Kad mislim na to"	2021	10	Blues po kišnim plažama
"Zadnji dan ljeta"	2022	5	Zadnji dan ljeta
"Ocean"	2023	4	Zadnji dan ljeta
"Pored mene" with z++	2024	17	Zadnji dan ljeta
"Turist" with Mladen Badovinac	2025	52	Zadnji dan ljeta
"Utjeha" with nipplepeople	2025	17	Zadnji dan ljeta
"Drugi dan"	2025	11	Zadnji dan ljeta
"Magija"	2026	8	Zadnji dan ljeta
"—" denotes releases that did not chart or were not released in that territory.
