= Rafael Dropulić =

Rafael Dropulić (born c. 1983), best known by his nickname Rafo, is a Croatian reality show winner and pop singer.

Dropulić was born in Mostar. He first became famous for winning the 2003 season of Story Supernova Music Talents, the reality show that aired on Nova TV.

Although he had questionable vocal talents, many observers attributed his Story Supernova Music Talents victory to a perceived bad boy image - popular among teenage girls, who happened to be the most enthusiastic televoters. Unsurprisingly, after the show ended he released only one single which was panned by critics. He was widely described as a one hit wonder even before the single.

In 2005, Croatia Records released his album Mangipe.

In 2008, he won the top prize of half a million on another Croatian reality show Farma.
