= Davor Dretar =

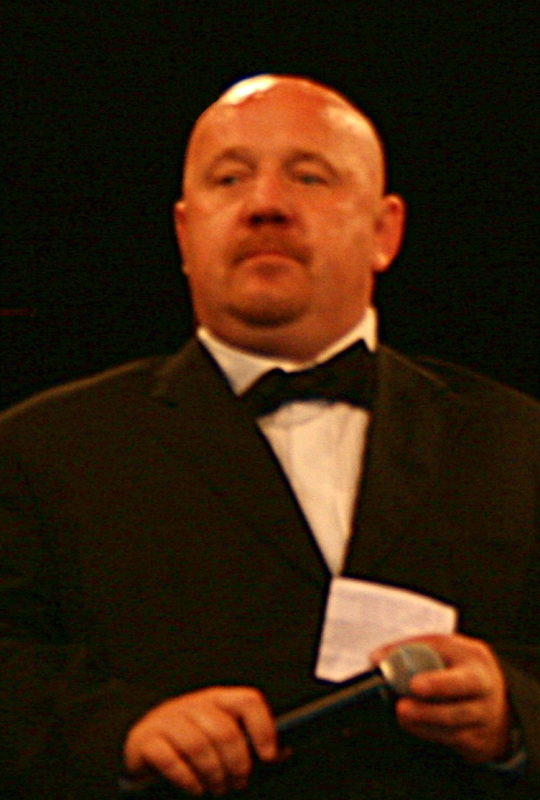

Background information
- Also known as: Drele
- Born: 13 September 1966 (age 59); Zagreb, SFR Yugoslavia
- Origin: Croatia
- Genres: Pop, Folk, "Pop-kuruza"
- Occupations: Singer, radio presenter, television presenter
- Years active: 1989–present

Davor Dretar, also known as Drele (born 13 September 1966) is a Croatian singer, radio presenter and television presenter. He is also a founding member of musical group "Dreletronic".

He was a host of the Croatian reality show "Farma". In 2009, he competed in the Croatian Radiotelevision popular show "Zvijezde pjevaju", which is the Croatian version of the show Just the Two of Us (TV series) and eventually finished the season in fifth place with his singing mate, a well known singer Zorica Kondža. He also made a minor appearance in television sitcoms "Stipe u gostima", "Bitange i princeze" and "Zauvijek susjedi".

In the year 2007 he entered the Guinness World Records with his colleague Kristijan Petrović for longest hosting of a talk-show ever. It was performed as a part of the annually held entertainment festival Špancirfest and it lasted 35 hours and 16 minutes. At present he is working as a radio presenter of a morning programme on Narodni radio radio station.

In the 2020 Croatian parliamentary election, he was elected to the Croatian Parliament representing the Homeland Movement.

== Filmography ==
=== Television appearances ===
- "Stipe u gostima" as Klempi / štef
- "Bitange i princeze" as Drele (2007)
- "Zauvijek susjedi" as Joža Bednjanec

=== Television and radio presenter ===
- "Narodni radio"
- "Farma" as presenter (2008–2010)
- "Zvijezde pjevaju" as competitor (2009)
- "Genijalci" as competitor
