= Sram season 1 =

Sram
- Season 1
- Promotional image for the first season, depicting Nora (Gita Haydar), Tina (Laura Barbić), Eva (Lucija Stanković), Vanessa (Severina Lajtman), and Nika (Stela Korman)
- Starring: Lucija Stanković; Jagor Katičić; Gita Haydar; Stela Korman; Laura Barbić; Severina Lajtman; Borna Šimunek; Tin Lekić; Roan Vižintin; Karla Šunjić
- No. of episodes: 10

Release
- Original network: HRT 1 / HRTi / YouTube
- Original release: 27 October – 28 December 2024

Season chronology
- Next → Season 2

The first season of the Croatian teen drama television and web series Sram aired from 27 October to 28 December 2024 on HRT 1, HRTi and YouTube. The season was released in real time through short clips posted on Instagram, TikTok and YouTube, with HRT 1 airing full episodes on Sundays.

Based on the first season of the Norwegian Skam, the season features Eva Šilović (Lucija Stanković) as the central character. The season follows Eva as she adjusts to a new school, while meeting new friends and handling her relationship with Jakov (Jagor Katičić).

The season was met with positive response from the audience and the media and was a ratings success for HRT. It accumulated 64 million views across Instagram, TikTok and YouTube. On 28 October 2024, following the premiere episode, Miach and Hiljson Mandela released "Anđeo," the official soundtrack for the series, which achieved great commercial success and was the most played radio song in Croatia in 2025.

== Cast and characters ==
=== Main cast ===
- Lucija Stanković as Eva Šilović
- Jagor Katičić as Jakov
- Gita Haydar as Nora Klarić Selem
- Laura Barbić as Tina
- Stela Korman as Nika "Nix"
- Severina Lajtman as Vanessa
- Borna Šimunek as Lovro Dević

=== Recurring cast ===
- Karla Šunjić as Sara Noršić
- Tin Lekić as Roko Marić
- Roan Vižintin as Nikola "Nix"
- Mirej Đurović as Ines

=== Guest cast ===
- Luka Vuković as the boy at the cafeteria
- Ružica Butorac as the waitress at the cafeteria
- Kristian Bonačić as Žac
- Dijana Vidušin as Eva's mother
- Pere Cukrov as the conductor
- Barbara Prpić as the German teacher
- Olivera Baljak as Dr. Šustić
- Adrijana Prugovečki as the nurse
- Larisa Jukić as Marica
- Lucija Milojčić as Maja
- Viktoria Knezić as Jakov's sister

== Production ==
The making of the series was first confirmed on 9 April 2024 in an article by Variety. The teaser trailer for the season was released on 15 October 2024.

== Episodes ==
No. overall	No. in season	Title	Duration	Original release date
1	1	"Izgledaš kao drolja" "You Look Like a Slut"	22 min	27 October 2024
After her boyfriend Jakov and her friend Lovro declined to attend a party, Eva decides to go alone. At the party, she confronts her former friend Sara, who acts rudely towards her. After failed attempt to reconcile her friendship with Sara, Eva is approached by Nora. In the bathroom, Eva meets Nika and her friend Tina, who is in trouble because she needs to find a way to get home.
2	2	"Vikendica" "Cottage"	21 min	3 November 2024
Eva and Jakov spend the weekend at a vacation house, but Eva is unhappy that Jakov invited Lovro to join them. After Jakov's older friend Žac joins the three unannounced, Eva snaps at Jakov during the dinner.
3	3	"Trebaš naći ekipu" "You Need to Find a Squad"	20 min	10 November 2024
Jakov tells Eva that she needs to meet new friends, so she messages Nora and later sits with her in their German class at school. She later re-encounters Tina and Nika as well and is introduced to Vanessa during recess. Eva invites all of the girls to a party at her house.
4	4	"Ostavi dečka" "Leave Your Boyfriend"	20 min	17 November 2024
The girls go to Nikola's birthday party in order to attempt to get close to the popular boys at the school. Vanessa tells Eva to break up with Jakov and hook up with Nikola, given that Nikola seem to be interested in her.
5	5	"Što te pali?" "What Turns You On?"	22 min	24 November 2024
The girls visit a gynecologist to get information on safe sex because Tina wants to have sex with Roko. Eva arranges a dinner to introduce Jakov to her mom, but he does not show up. When she calls him, she hears Sara's voice in the background.
6	6	"Znaš kad ti dečko laže" "You Know When Your Boyfriend's Lying to You"	20 min	1 December 2024
Eva is suspecting that Jakov is seeing Sara again, which he denies. Eva and Jakov have a fight, whereas Tina is disappointed that Roko does not notice her after they had sex. She wants to win his attention back by sending him nude pictures, which is disapproved by the rest of the girls. Later at a party, Sara tells Eva that she met with Jakov. Disappointed by her discovery, Eva wants to leave the party, but Nikola tries to make her feel better, and the two end up kissing. After the kiss, Eva finds out that Nikola is in a relationship with Ines.
7	7	"Otkud tebi da ja tebe volim?" "Where Did You Get the Idea That I Love You?"	20 min	8 December 2024
Eva and Jakov reconcile. In the school, Tina confronts Roko about him ignoring her, and Nora stands in Tina's defense. Ines finds out about Eva and Nikola kissing, and initiates a catfight between her and Eva's respective friend groups in the school yard.
8	8	"Cijela škola te mrzi" "The Entire School Hates You"	20 min	15 December 2024
Jakov breaks up with Eva, and she unsuccessfully keeps trying to reconcile with him. Eva is bullied and slut-shamed by other students, which leads to her quarrels with her mom and Tina. She, however, reconciles with Sara. Meanwhile, Roko keeps hitting on Nora, who is uninterested.
9	9	"Zašto si mi uništio vezu?" "Why Did You Ruin My Relationship?"	19 min	22 December 2024
Jakov and Eva are on friendly terms, as they're trying to help Lovro whose parents are divorcing. Tina is still alienated from Eva and the rest of the group. Ines, having broken up with Nikola, invites Eva to a Christmas party, as she wants to apologize for her actions. At the party, Eva confronts Lovro who tells her it was him who told Ines about her and Nikola's kiss. Eva and the group help Tina after finding her unconscious in front of Ines' place.
10	10	"Je li ovo closure?" "Is This Closure?"	24 min	28 December 2024 (Note: Due to the 2024–25 Croatian presidential election taking place on Sunday, 29 December, the episode was broadcast a day earlier, on Saturday, 28 December.)
The girls visit the gynecologist again after Tina has a pregnancy scare, and the gynecologist warns her about her unhealthy diet. Roko continues to hit on the uninterested Nora. Eva interrogates Lovro about why he betrayed her trust. She meets up with Jakov at her place to break up with him for good, but only after losing her virginity to him. At a Christmas market, Roko awkwardly apologizes to Tina, while Nora discovers a gay dating app on Lovro's phone.

== Music ==
=== Tracklist ===
You Look Like a Slut
"Prelude" (Carmen) – Georges Bizet
"Ima nema nas" – Pocket Palma
"Zauvijek" – Z++
"Klizim po mahali" – Cunami Flo
"Better Than Ever" – Yarin Primak and Mkada
"Ave Maria" (cello version) – Johann Sebastian Bach
"Tik tak" – Mimi Mercedez and Mili
"Elevate!" – Frank Bentley
"Anđeo" – Hiljson Mandela and Miach
"Mangio Pasta" – Peki and Grše
"Mamma Mia" – Grše

Cottage
"Tonem u noć" – Jymenik featuring Summer Deaths
"Blank Face" – Luzeri
"Dolje na koljena" – Vesna Pisarović
"Gangsta" – KUKU$

You Need to Find a Squad
"Slipping" – Jane & The Boy
"Skarabej" – Miach
"Tempo" – Miach
"333" – Neya

Leave Your Boyfriend
"Dreaming" – Stanley Gurvich
"Trendsetter" – Frank Bentley and Ziso
"Move" – Jane & The Boy
"Sram Original #2 Facetime" – Mihovil Šoštarić
"Sram Original #3" – Mihovil Šoštarić
"Ankaran" (instrumental) – Hiljson Mandela and Biba
"Gram" – Baks featuring Miach
"Fresh mala" – Špiro and Bejbe
"30CC" – 30zona and Crni Cerak
"Ankaran" – Hiljson Mandela and Biba

What Turns You On?
"Someday Soon" (instrumental version) – Jackson Rau
"Like the Old Days" – Warmkeys
"Tokyo Drift" – Grše and Mimi Mercedez
"Nemoš to" – Tej and Špiro
"Dark Forest" – John Dada & the Weatherman
"Timeless" – Ann Paris
"Purify" – Roniit
"30CC" – 30zona and Crni Cerak
"Blossom" – Žena

You Know When Your Boyfriend's Lying to You
"I'm Not There" – Stephen-Ross McGruther
"Someday Soon" (instrumental version) – Jackson Rau
"Tuc tuc" – Senna M
"Ja sam vlak" – Emilija Kokić and Nina Badrić
"Šumica" – I Bee

Where Did You Get the Idea That I Love You?
"Like the Old Days" – Warmkeys
"Interpretation" – Jozeque
"Sedmo nebo" – Z++
"Udari" – Triestri

The Entire School Hates You
"Someday Soon" (instrumental version) – Jackson Rau
"Život nije siv" – Mia Dimšić
"Fall" – Stanley Gurvich
"My Love" – AJ
"Dreaming" – Stanley Gurvich
"Ad infinitum" – Theatre of Delays

Why Did You Ruin My Relationship?
"Someday Soon" (instrumental version) – Jackson Rau
"Bunga Party" – Vojko V
"I Don't Mind the Cold" – Orkas
"Getting Ready for Christmas" – Francesco D'Andrea
"The Day of the Dead" – Randy Sharp and Jones 2.0
"U to vrijeme godišta" – Zbor mladih Preslavnoga Imena Marijina
"Djevojke" – Remi

Is This Closure?
"Summers Come Early" – Sean Williams
"Trebaš li me" – Eni Jurišić and Matija Cvek
"Dijamanti" – Z++
"Tiha noć" – Zbor Prirodoslovne škole Vladimira Preloga, Zagreb
"Anđeo" – Hiljson Mandela and Miach
