= Sram season 3 =

Sram
- Season 3
- Promotional image for the third season, depicting Lovro (Borna Šimunek) and Maša (Vesna Tomić)
- Starring: Borna Šimunek; Fran Rabuzin; Jagor Katičić; Jana Jakopović; Boromir Kovačević; Špiro Filip Lasić; Adrian Pezdirc; Lucija Stanković; Severina Lajtman; Gita Haydar; Laura Barbić; Stela Korman
- No. of episodes: 10

Release
- Original network: HRT 1 / HRTi / YouTube
- Original release: 10 January – 14 March 2026

Season chronology
- ← Previous; Season 2 Next → Season 4

The third season of the Croatian teen drama television and web series Sram premiered on 10 January 2026. Based on the third season of the Norwegian Skam, the season focuses on Lovro, portrayed by Borna Šimunek. The season's full episodes air on HRT 1, HRTi, and YouTube, with short clips also released on Instagram and TikTok.

The season was confirmed by Croatian Radiotelevision (HRT) on 19 September 2025, with the official teaser trailer released on 15 December of the same year. The season is notable for being among the rare Croatian original television productions to engage in depth with LGBTQ+ themes, including questions of sexual identity and same-sex relationships.

The plot synopsis released for the season follows Lovro, torn between other people's expectations and his own dilemmas, as he develops a relationship that forces him to question who he is and how much he is willing to be honest with himself and those around him.

== Cast and characters ==
The list of characters on the official website sram.hr was updated in December 2025, following the release of the trailer.

=== Main cast ===
- Borna Šimunek as Lovro Dević
- Fran Rabuzin as Ivan Kovačić
- Jagor Katičić as Jakov
- Jana Jakopović as Ema Sertić
- Boromir Kovačević as Mario
- Špiro Filip Lasić as Filip Gudelj
- Lucija Stanković as Eva Šilović
- Adrian Pezdirc as Vito
- Severina Lajtman as Vanessa
- Gita Haydar as Nora Klarić Selem
- Laura Barbić as Tina
- Stela Korman as Nika "Nix"

=== Recurring cast ===
- Vesna Tomić as Maša Batalić
- Tin Lekić as Roko Marić
- Roan Vižintin as Nikola "Nix"
- Ana Magud as Ana, Lovro's mother
- Rok Juričić as Karlo, Vito's boyfriend
- Nikolina Prkačin as Sonja Nikolić, Ivan's girlfriend

=== Guest cast ===
- Karla Šunjić as Sara Noršić
- Ignor as the band in the first episode
- Ivan Zelić as the police officer in the first episode
- Luzeri as the band in the fourth episode
- Naomi Diamond as the dancer in the seventh episode
- Ana Sikavica as the professor in the eighth episode
- Ema Kelava Vrdoljak as the receptionist in the eighth episode
- Krešimir Turk as the man in the sauna in the eighth episode

== Season overview ==
=== Background ===
The plot of the season is told from the perspective of Lovro, portrayed by Borna Šimunek, who is based on the character of Isak Valtersen from Skam. The original third season of Skam was released in 2016.

Lovro was first introduced in the first season of the series, as the best friend of Jakov, who was in a relationship with Eva Šilović, the central character of the season. In the final episode of the first season, Nora discovers a gay dating app on Lovro's phone, which led Nora and Eva to question his sexuality. Lovro assumed a minor role in the second season.

== Production ==
Following the conclusion of the second season in June 2025, the producers of Sram, Ivan Lovreček and Bruno Mustić, gave an interview for N1 in July 2025, outlining their plans for upcoming seasons. Although the season had not been officially confirmed at that time, Lovreček noted that it is going to be "specific," given that it plans to focus on a male character who is "coming to terms with his sexuality."

In an article from 19 September 2025, HRT confirmed that Sram is set to enter its third season. On 16 October, HRT and the show's official Instagram accounts posted a 26-second-long reel that showcased a montage of clips of Lovro from previous seasons, alluding to his role as the central character of the third season. On 4 November, HRT revealed that the filming of the season had begun, confirming Lovro's central role for the season. The season was written by Sandra Pašić and Boris Grgurević. Jelena Gavrilović returned as director, having also directed the previous two seasons, while Tomislav Sutlar joined the team as director of photography.

The official teaser trailer for the season was released online on 15 December 2025, featuring the song "Božić dolazi" (Croatian for 'Christmas Is Coming') by Diletanti. The trailer introduced two new characters, Mario and Filip, with previous season's principal cast members reprising their roles.

== Release ==
The season premiered on 10 January 2026. It consisted of 10 episodes. The first clip was released online on 1 January 2026 at midnight.

== Episodes ==
No. overall	No. in season	Title	Duration	Original release date
21	1	"Tko je taj tip?" "Who's That Guy?"	28 min	10 January 2026
Lovro and Jakov are getting ready to meet up with Filip and Mario to celebrate New Year. In the club, Lovro meets Ema and asks her for her phone number. Meanwhile, Eva, Tina, Vanessa and Nika are preparing a surprise party for Nora and Roko's arrival from Amsterdam; Lovro invites Ema. The day before the party, Lovro and Ema attempt to have sex, but he becomes nervous, and she respects his hesitation. She leaves before he wakes up the next morning. Right before Nora and Roko arrive, Eva tells Lovro that she uses Nora's bedroom while Nora is in Amsterdam and that she would ask Nora if he can do the same. A boy named Ivan crashes the party. After the police break up the party, the crossfaded Lovro asks Ivan to give him a ride home on his Tomos.
22	2	"Lik s više dimenzija" "Multi-faceted Guy"	26 min	17 January 2026
The hungover Lovro calls Eva and tells her he left his weed at the party venue. That evening Lovro, Eva and Jakov meet with Nora who is packing to leave, and Lovro decides to move into her bedroom. In the schoolyard, Tina invites Ivan to a karaoke party she is organizing, while the infatuated Mario watches her from a distance. Tina tells Lovro she has his weed, and playfully blackmails him to come with his friends to the karaoke party, where they have to sing if they want it back. Ema wants to slow down with Lovro and doesn't come to the karaoke party. At the party, while Nika is giving Lovro the weed back in the bathroom, he briefly meets with and greets Ivan. Ivan invites Lovro to smoke at his place. There he tells Lovro about his love for Josipa Lisac, failed basketball career and painting hobby. When Ivan's girlfriend Sonja comes over, Lovro leaves.
23	3	"Ne mogu plesat" "I Can't Dance"	26 min	24 January 2026
During a basketball game in PE class, Lovro is called a faggot by one of Ivan's classmates. Now living at Nora's, Lovro overhears Vito quarreling with his boyfriend. Lovro and Ema pick up the earrings she forgot at the surprise party venue, and they talk about their relationship. He invites her to a party he's organizing at Nora's. While listening to the Dnevnik jedne ljubavi vinyl, Lovro reminisces about the motorcycle ride with Ivan; he asks an AI chatbot if he's gay. At the party, Lovro introduces Ema to Ivan and Sonja. The couples dance while Lovro and Ivan exchange looks. After the party, in the street, Lovro and Ivan decorate a discarded Christmas tree; Ivan attempts to kiss Lovro but Lovro pushes him away and leaves.
24	4	"Šta radimo ovdje?" "What Are We Doing Here?"	27 min	31 January 2026
Maša tells Vito and Lovro about Nora and Roko's quarrels in Amsterdam. Lovro texts Ivan about meeting him, but Ivan avoids him. Ivan and Sonja visit the escape room Ema works at, and play the game with Lovro. At the end, Sonja invites Ema and Lovro on a double date at Ivan's place. A drunk Lovro gets into a bar fight, which worries Jakov, Mario, and Filip. The next day, Lovro introduces Ema to his mum, and they like each other. On the double date, Sonja reveals that it's Ivan's birthday, so he and Lovro go on his Tomos to get alcohol. Instead, they break into the city pool and share two pecks on the lips underwater.
25	5	"2026." "2026"	26 min	7 February 2026
While ignoring Ema's texts since he left the double date with Ivan, Lovro meets him at a playground, where Ivan draws him and tells him that he doesn't mind a person's gender when it comes to dating. Lovro asks Ivan if he would leave Sonja for another guy; he says he maybe would. While Lovro daydreams about Ivan and the pool, Jakov calls and tells Lovro that he can always confide in him. Ivan's drawing is delivered to Nora's place, where Vito interrogates Lovro about who drew it. While Jakov, Mario and Filip discuss the mandatory military service, Ivan invites Lovro behind the school cafeteria where they share a kiss, twice. The next day, Ivan tells Lovro that he likes him. Lovro doesn't respond, but continues to ignore Ema's texts. The next day, Lovro tells Vito about Ivan, but due to his internalized homophobia offends Vito. That evening, Lovro is stood up by Ivan, and the next day Ema reveals to him that Sonja discovered his and Ivan's messages, and breaks up with him.
26	6	"Jesi li se ikad zaljubio u curu?" "Have You Ever Been in Love with a Girl?"	24 min	14 February 2026
Ivan tells Lovro that he had to tell Sonja, as there was no point in lying. Lovro, however, gives him the cold treatment. While Lovro, Vito and Maša are having breakfast, both Ivan and Sonja try to contact Lovro; simultaneously, Nora arrives unannounced from Amsterdam. Lovro and Eva decide to visit Nora, and they find her and Roko arguing. When Nora refuses to return to Amsterdam, he throws her suitcase across the room and leaves. Eva, Lovro and Maša remain consoling Nora. Ema visits Lovro at his mom's urging; she doesn't tell her about the breakup. She consoles Lovro, and promises she and Sonja will tell nobody about his sexuality. The next day, after Ema's suggestion, Lovro tells Jakov about Ivan, and he's supportive.
27	7	"Jesi ti ozbiljan?" "Are You Serious?"	27 min	21 February 2026
Ivan and Sonja both want to talk to Lovro; his mother questions him about what is bothering him, but he rebuffs her. Lovro apologizes to Vito, who then tells him about his experiences as a gay man, and takes him to a ballroom night. Tina tells Lovro there are rumors about him and Ivan being together; Lovro receives a voice note from Sonja who says Ivan is unwell. Ivan tells Lovro he broke up with Sonja. Jakov, Eva and Nora visit Lovro to cheer him up; Eva and Nora tell him about the dating app they saw on his phone. Jakov tells Mario and Filip about Lovro's sexuality; Mario is supportive but Filip quietly leaves. Lovro, Mario and Jakov encourage each other to text Ivan, Tina and Eva, respectively. Ivan arrives and leaves with Lovro on his Tomos.
28	8	"Zadržati nekoga zauvijek" "To Keep Someone Forever"	28 min	28 February 2026
Lovro wakes up at Ivan's place the next day and finds him painting self-portraits. Ivan mentions he has not slept. They kiss and cuddle on the floor. Filip ends his friendship with Lovro because of his homophobia. Vanessa tries to comfort Lovro, linking their respective experiences with Romaphobia and homophobia, but he rebuffs her. Later that day, he comes out to him mum; she is simultaneously supportive and overwhelmed. Lovro finds a cucumber in a condom in his backpack and asks Filip if he put it there; Filip threatens to beat him up. Jakov is furious and wants to beat Filip up, but Mario and Lovro calm him down. Lovro answers Sonja's call while on a date with Ivan, which he leaves after he gets uncomfortable with Ivan's touches in public. While talking with Jakov and Mario about the cucumber incident, Lovro sees Ivan in the schoolyard stacking chairs in a pile. Lovro and Ivan go to the pool and sauna, where they once again have an argument about touching in public, prompting Ivan to streak through the streets.
29	9	"Minutu po minutu" "Minute By Minute"	26 min	7 March 2026
At Ivan's place, Sonja tells Lovro that the doctors suspect Ivan to have bipolar disorder, and that he has been unmedicated for around two months. Lovro sleeps over at Nora's place, and she comforts him. Vito takes Lovro and Nora out, and Lovro tells them about Ivan's diagnosis. He also tells Mario and Jakov; Mario mentions Filip's mom being bipolar and suggests Lovro should talk to him. The apathetic Filip says that his mother would stop taking her medication when she felt good. Sonja calls Lovro over to Ivan's place, where she tells him that he has gone missing. Lovro finds drawings of himself in Ivan's room. An animated sequence depicts Lovro searching for Ivan all around Zagreb. Ivan finds Lovro instead, and Lovro takes him to his place for the first time. There, Lovro defies Ivan's pleas to "not do that to himself", referring to his diagnosis, and convinces him that he will try to always be there for him because he is in love with him. Reassured, Ivan embraces him.
30	10	""Zamisli najbolju stvar"" "Imagine the Best Thing"	26 min	14 March 2026
Next morning, Lovro and Ivan wake up in Lovro's room. Lovro's mum comes in with a cake, revealing that it's Lovro's birthday, and invites Ivan to stay. Lovro visits Sonja at work and she tells him her experiences dealing with Ivan's diagnosis while in a relationship. Lovro tells Ivan about the conversation. In the school cafeteria, the two fantasize about kissing in public with the entire cafeteria cheering them on. Lovro introduces Ivan to Jakov and Vito, and the three talk about Matura and college options. When left alone, Lovro and Ivan kiss in public for the first time. Ema is holding an exhibition of her photos; there, Mario finally talks to Tina, Jakov gives Eva his camera after losing a bet, and Vanessa reads Lovro's and Ivan's palms. Eva hands the camera to Vanessa for keeping overnight, and Vanessa goes home.

== Music ==
=== Tracklist ===
Who's That Guy?
"Božić dolazi" – Diletanti
"Rac" – Ignor
"Druga strana" – Luzeri
"Relaps" – Ružno Pače
"Terra magica" – Nemanja
"Anđeo" – Hiljson Mandela and Miach
"Druga cura" – Baks
"AMGVSQ7Audi" – Rasta
"Faza" – Miach
"Snijeg" – Detour

Multi-faceted Guy
"Dela blues" – KUKU$
"Nije u šoldima sve" – Mladen Grdović and Bepo Matešić
"Prava ljubav" – Lana Jurčević and Luka Nižetić
"Lutka" – S.A.R.S.
"O jednoj mladosti" – Josipa Lisac
"Korzika" – Nemanja
"Duh u ormaru" – Ki Klop

I Can't Dance
"Zva' ću te" – RØLØ
"Posebna" – Špiro and Tej
"Venera" – Luzeri and Miach
"Spajdermen" – Špiro and Tej
"O jednoj mladosti" – Josipa Lisac
"Jeftino" – Špiro and Tej featuring Hiljson Mandela
"Onaj osjećaj" – Kids from the Sky
"Tajna" – Nipplepeople

What Are We Doing Here?
"Highschool Crush" – Luzeri
"Oh Shit" – Luzeri
"No One But You" – Stray Dogg

2026
"Što sam želio sa 16" – Suze od Luka
"Deluzija" – Guzo
"Telo" – Jymenik
"Ruke" – Bejbe
"Hideaway" – Neon Lies
"Moj dečko je gay" – Lezbor

Have You Ever Been in Love with a Girl?
"Rijetko te viđam sa djevojkama" – Luzeri
"Uhvati ritam" – Parni Valjak

Are You Serious?
"Prava fem queen" – Mimi Mercedez
"Uzmi ili ostavi" – Z++
"Potopi ovaj brod" – IDEM
"Dan D" – Prazna Lepinja featuring Hiljson Mandela
"S prozora" – Ki Klop
"Dok razmišljam o nama" – Josipa Lisac

To Keep Someone Forever
"U svađi sa celim svetom" – Proto Tip
"Ja te vodim do dna" – Svemirko

Minute by Minute
"In Time" – Lovely Quinces
"Zavičaj" – Klinika Denisa Kataneca
