= List of number-one singles of 2026 (Croatia) =

This is a list of the Croatian number-one singles of 2026 as compiled by Croatia Songs, part of Hits of the World Billboard chart series, provided by Billboard.

Number-one singles, showing issue date, song and artist names
No.	Issue date	Song	Artist(s)	Ref.
49	3 January 2026	"Last Christmas"	Wham!	
re	10 January 2026	"Terca na tišinu"	Silente	
re	17 January 2026	"Terca na tišinu"	Silente	
50	24 January 2026	"Betmen"	Baka Prase and Choda	
51	31 January 2026	"Sante"	Grše and Miach	
re	7 February 2026	"TEC-9"	Jala Brat and Buba Corelli	
52	14 February 2026	"Mirjana"	Coby	
53	21 February 2026	"Ja volim"	Jakov Jozinović	
53	28 February 2026	"Ja volim"	Jakov Jozinović	
53	7 March 2026	"Ja volim"	Jakov Jozinović	
54	14 March 2026	"Envolver"	Anitta	
re	21 March 2026	"Ja volim"	Jakov Jozinović	
re	28 March 2026	"TEC-9"	Jala Brat and Buba Corelli	
55	4 April 2026	"Intercontinental"	Relja	
55	11 April 2026	"Intercontinental"	Relja	
55	18 April 2026	"Intercontinental"	Relja	
55	25 April 2026	"Intercontinental"	Relja	
56	2 May 2026	"Topovska"	Buba Corelli	
56	9 May 2026	"Topovska"	Buba Corelli	
56	16 May 2026	"Topovska"	Buba Corelli	
56	23 May 2026	"Topovska"	Buba Corelli	
56	30 May 2026	"Topovska"	Buba Corelli	
57	6 June 2026	"Bass & Rave"	Jala Brat and Buba Corelli	
57	13 June 2026	"Bass & Rave"	Jala Brat and Buba Corelli	
57	20 June 2026	"Bass & Rave"	Jala Brat and Buba Corelli	
57	27 June 2026	"Bass & Rave"	Jala Brat and Buba Corelli	
58	4 July 2026	"Raj"	Jakov Jozinović	
re	11 July 2026	"Topovska"	Buba Corelli	
re	18 July 2026	"Bass & Rave"	Jala Brat and Buba Corelli	
59	25 July 2026	"RocknRolla"	Devito	
59	1 August 2026	"RocknRolla"	Devito	
59	8 August 2026	"RocknRolla"	Devito	
59	15 August 2026	"RocknRolla"	Devito	
59	22 August 2026	"RocknRolla"	Devito	
59	29 August 2026	"RocknRolla"	Devito	
59	5 September 2026	"RocknRolla"	Devito	
59	12 September 2026	"RocknRolla"	Devito	
59	19 September 2026	"RocknRolla"	Devito	
59	26 September 2026	"RocknRolla"	Devito	
60	3 October 2026	"Ljubav"	Mina Kostić	
60	10 October 2026	"Ljubav"	Mina Kostić	
60	17 October 2026	"Ljubav"	Mina Kostić	
60	24 October 2026	"Ljubav"	Mina Kostić	
61	31 October 2026	"Barcelona"	Jala Brat and Buba Corelli	
62	7 November 2026	"Shalala"	Jala Brat, Buba Corelli and Elena	
62	14 November 2026	"Shalala"	Jala Brat, Buba Corelli and Elena	
62	21 November 2026	"Shalala"	Jala Brat, Buba Corelli and Elena	

== Number-one artists of 2026 ==
List of number-one artists by total weeks at number one
Position	Artist	Weeks at No. 1
1	Buba Corelli	17
2	Jala Brat	11
3	Devito	10
4	Jakov Jozinović	5
5	Mina Kostić	4
5	Relja	4
7	Elena	3
8	Silente	2
9	Anitta	1
9	Baka Prase	1
9	Choda	1
9	Coby	1
9	Grše	1
9	Miach	1
9	Wham!	1

== See also ==
- List of Croatian airplay number-one songs of 2026
- List of number-one albums of 2026 (Croatia)
