= Sram season 2 =

Sram
- Season 2
- Promotional image for the second season, depicting Nora (Gita Haydar) and Roko (Tin Lekić)
- Starring: Gita Haydar
- No. of episodes: 10

Release
- Original network: HRT 1 / HRTi / YouTube
- Original release: 26 April – 28 June 2025

Season chronology
- ← Previous; Season 1 Next → Season 3

The second season of the Croatian teen drama television series Sram aired from 26 April to 28 June 2025 on HRT 1, HRTi and YouTube.

Season 2 follows Nora, a fiercely independent feminist, as she develops a romantic relationship with Roko, whose reputation and lifestyle initially place him at odds with her values and expectations. The season also focuses on the impact and aftermath of sexual assault. Themes of love, trust, vulnerability, trauma, resilience, and personal growth are explored, as Nora reassesses many of her assumptions about relationships and those around her.

This season became the most successful season of Sram to date, surpassing the viewership and engagement figures achieved by the first season. Compared with Season 1, viewership doubled to 143 million views, while online engagement nearly tripled compared to the debut season. Across its digital platforms, the series and its characters attracted a combined following of more than 700,000 users. The season's popularity established Sram as one of the most prominent youth-oriented digital productions in the region and contributed significantly to the series' growing cultural impact.

For her portrayal of Nora in the second season, Gita Haydar was nominated for Best Actress in a Leading Role in a TV Series at the Adriatic Film Awards. Season 2 received a special mention in the Best TV Series (CEE) category at the NEM Awards 2025 in Zagreb on 11 December. The season also won the Zlatni Studio Award for Television Series of the Year.

Throughout the run of the series, Nora Klarić (Gita Haydar), the central character of the second season, maintained the largest social media following among the series' characters, with over 100,000 followers on Instagram and 71,000 on TikTok. She was followed by Roko Marić (Tin Lekić), the season's male lead, who amassed over 50,000 Instagram followers and 31,000 TikTok followers. Based on the reported figures, Nora and Roko were the two most-followed characters across the series' social media platforms during the broadcast of the series. The season also produced the most-viewed clip on the Sram HR YouTube channel, with the Season 2, Episode 10, Clip 7, titled "Forever, She Said", accumulating more than 12 million views.

== Cast and characters ==
=== Main cast ===
- Gita Haydar as Nora Klarić Selem
- Tin Lekić as Roko Marić
- Lucija Stanković as Eva Šilović
- Laura Barbić as Tina
- Stela Korman as Nika "Nix"
- Severina Lajtman as Vanessa
- Adrian Pezdirc as Vito

=== Recurring cast ===
- Vesna Tomić as Maša Batalić
- Patricia Bušić as Petra
- Toni Kukuljica as Sven Marić
- Roan Vižintin as Nikola "Nix"
- Borna Šimunek as Lovro Dević
- Jagor Katičić as Jakov
- Mirej Đurović as Ines
- Karla Šunjić as Sara Noršić

=== Guest cast ===
- Patrik Kovačić as Mirek
- Paula Bušelić as Tena
- Ian Mikulec as the record salesman
- Mirjana Mikota as Nora's neighbour
- Patricia Bušić as Petra
- Igor Jadan as the drunk boy
- Ivan Lovreček and Bruno Mustić as the policemen
- Filip Božinović as Antonio
- Marino Okanović as Noa
- Lovro Marušić as Toma
- Toni Kukuljica as Sven Marić
- Roko Jurić as Hrc
- Maja Fišter as Nora's mother
- Jasna Rosandić as the nurse
- Adrijana Prugovečki as Nora's doctor
- Roman Fraj Sladoljev as the angry driver

== Episodes ==
No. overall	No. in season	Title	Duration	Original release date
11	1	"A naš dogovor?" "What About Our Deal?"	25 min	26 April 2025
While attending the opening of a new bar in the city, Nora, Eva, Nika, and Vanessa discover that Roko helped Tina land a job as the bar's hostess. Nora confronts Roko, arguing that the job is demeaning, but Roko remains insistent on pursuing a date with Nora. While the girls are hanging out at Nora's place, Tina wants to leave for Roko's party. Nora texts Roko asking him to stop contacting Tina, and hints that she might agree to a date with him after he complies and cancels the party altogether.
12	2	"Što ćemo nas dvoje?" "What Are the Two of Us Gonna Do?"	26 min	3 May 2025
Vanessa, Tina, Nora and Nika sit in the school yard and watch Jakov making out with his new girlfriend. Tina tells Eva the gossip that third-graders like Jakov because he's good at oral. Eva is inspired to revive her dating life, and Nora tells her about her date, but doesn't reveal it is with Roko. Tina wonders if Nora is a lesbian because of her perceived misandry and feminism. Eva has cold feet about her date, and Nora lies to Tina that she can't go with Eva because she has to tutor a younger student. Vito figures out that she has a date; Roko picks her up but the atmosphere between the two is cold. Nora blames him for manipulating and taking advantage of Tina; Roko retorts that he only apologized to Tina because Nora asked him to, and not to give Tina hope that they will reconcile, and also that he found a hosting job for her purely because she needed a job. Nora refuses Roko's ride home and arrives to her place where she finds the drunken Vito, Tina and Eva, whose date fell through. Tina notices that Nora wore perfume to her tutoring class, which Vito points out was held on Friday night.
13	3	"Nisam ja kriv što lažeš frendici" "It's Not My Fault You're Lying to Your Friend"	27 min	10 May 2025
Nora meets with the girls in the school yard, where they are gossiping about Roko's friend group ending up in a fight on Friday night. Eva tells Tina that she heard from Sara about Roko not being with them because he was on a date with an unknown girl; Nora remains silent. In private, Eva figures out that Nora was the one he was on a date with, which Nora confirms and asks her to keep it a secret. Despite initially not wanting to go to Roko's Friday party, Nora ends up going after Eva sends a video of Tina embarrassing herself by hitting on Roko. When Nora arrives, Tina has gone home in tears because Roko had rejected her for good. After the police shuts down the party, Nora is stuck at Roko's place as one of the departing guests took her jacket, which had her phone and keys. After Nora texts Vito via Roko's Instagram account, she and Roko play Roko's synthesizer before going to bed. Roko lets Nora sleep in his bed and goes to sleep on the couch, but after discovering that one of the party guests spilled beer on it, Nora lets him join her in bed.
14	4	"Nitko te ne tjera da budeš tu" "Nobody's Forcing You to Be Here"	24 min	16 May 2025 (Note: Due to the Eurovision Song Contest 2025 Grand Final taking place on Saturday, 17 May, the episode was broadcast a day earlier, on Friday, 16 May.)
While digging through Eva's closet to donate clothes to orphans on Vito's initiative, Eva and Nora receive a DM from Tina inviting them to a party organized by Roko's friend group. Nora is hesitant because an entrance fee is paid so that they can raise money to pay for the school microscope which, as Roko tells her, Nikola broke and they all took the blame. To convince Nora to come, Roko persuades Nikola to donate a percentage of the raised money to orphans. At the party, Nora doesn't want to admit to Roko that she likes him and lies that she only came over to take care of Eva. He points out that she failed; Eva gets drunk early, awkwardly introduces herself to Jakov's new girlfriend Tena and kisses Tina in front of Nikola. Roko tells Nora to look him in the eyes and tell him she doesn't like him; she does so and rants about how shallow all men are. Roko leaves, which makes Nora regret what she said. She runs after him and they kiss, as Tina holds a drunk Eva's head while Eva vomits from an overpass above Nora and Roko.
15	5	"Ovo je Nora i upravo odlazi" "This Is Nora and She Was Just Leaving"	25 min	24 May 2025
Nora and Roko are spending the morning after the party in his bedroom, although Nora refuses to have sex with him before marriage. Roko's brother Sven shows up unannounced, annoying Roko who gives Nora a hint to leave. She feels humiliated, which prompts Roko to apologize the following week. Even though she accepts the apology, Nora is hesitant to call themselves boyfriend and girlfriend. During brunch, Vito reveals to Nika and Tina that his mother hasn't spoken to him since he came out to her; Tina still struggles with her eating disorder. On the day of Norijada, Tina gossips with the girls that Roko will hook up with a lot of girls, and tells them that her cousin told her that Sven had been even more promiscuous when he went to college with her cousin. Initially having been falling for Roko, Nora is left subdued, especially after receiving a drunk text from him that he had a dream of them having sex. Nora wants to start over with Roko; she confesses that she feels like her parents don't love her, and he confesses that the death of his sister destroyed his family. They share a tearful kiss, before seeing Nikola and Lovro walk by together.
16	6	"Nora, opusti se" "Nora, Relax"	24 min	31 May 2025
Nora and Roko start following each other on Instagram. Nora and Eva want Vito to investigate if Nikola is gay; Vito agrees. With Eva's assistance, Nora and Roko continue to hide their situationship from Tina. Vito interrupts Nora and Roko's make-out session to tell Nora that Nikola is not gay. Nora is mustering the courage to tell Tina about Roko and herself, before going official. She unsuccessfully tries to do it before and during the seniors' coupe pre-party, during which a fight breaks out between Roko, Nikola, Lovro and their friend group, and an unknown group of guys crashing the party. Roko smashes a glass bottle over one of the guys' heads during the fight.
17	7	"Samo misliš na Roka" "You Only Think About Roko"	28 min	7 June 2025
Nora confronts Roko about the bottle smashing from the party. He justifies his actions, saying that he would go to any lengths to protect those he cares about. Nora asks for space, needing time to process his unexpected violent nature. At school, Nora and Vanessa discuss the fight. Vanessa discloses she figured out Nora and Roko by herself; she defends Roko by pointing out the party crashers' racism, and questions why Nora and Roko's differences are an issue. Eva reveals the fight was about molly. By Vanessa's encouragement, Nora finally talks to Tina about Roko. To Nora's surprise, Tina reveals she has known about them since their first kiss and asks Nora if she is in love with Roko. Nora professes she is; Tina gives them her blessing. Encouraged by Maša, Nora calls Roko who does not answer. She visits his house where she does not find Roko, but rather Sven, who is throwing a party. He convinces her to stay to wait for Roko. During her stay, Sven slanders Roko, implying he is hooking up with another girl, and flirts with her. With Roko still being absent for hours, she gets drunk on a cocktail Sven makes. When she is about to leave, Sven gets her some water, which is implied to be spiked. Nora loses consciousness as she promiscuously parties with Petra and Sven, eventually passing out on the floor.
18	8	"Obriši te fotke" "Delete Those Pics"	27 min	14 June 2025
Nora wakes up in her own bed next to Roko; he says he waited for her in front of her place. Vito tells her that Roko held her hair while she was vomiting. She calls Petra, who tells her that she drank too much at Sven's party so Petra called a taxi for her. She lies to Roko that she was with the girls the previous night; Roko tells her that he wasn't answering her calls because he lost his phone. He divulges that he goes to his moms' whenever Sven is at his dad's place throwing parties, and apologizes for the fight from the other night. He proceeds to take care of her while she is hungover. At school, Nora continues to dissociate. Roko takes Nora to Mount Sljeme where they meet Sven, who Roko reveals insisted on joining them. When Roko leaves to get their food and drinks, Nora asks Sven if someone spiked her drink at the party. Sven denies and gaslights her that she only got drunk; he shows her photos that he took of her half-naked and does not delete them when she asks. Excusing herself to the toilet, Nora runs into the forest where she has a panic attack. At home, she spirals further and exhibits an urge to self-harm; she gets a blood test at the doctors' the next day. Nora opens up to Eva who encourages her to tell Roko; both Eva and the doctor suspect Nora was drugged with GHB. The doctor educates and advises Nora, and insists that "it is not [her] fault".
19	9	"Fakat se ničeg ne sjećam" "I Deadass Don't Remember Anything"	26 min	21 June 2025
Still in distress, Nora lies about having contracted COVID-19 when Roko attempts to visit her. He drops off his grandfather's record player as a gift outside her bedroom door and leaves. She further isolates herself: rejecting calls from Roko and her mom, and refusing to open up to Vito. Tina tells Nika about Nora and Roko, she is upset that she is the last to find out. When Eva tries to get Nora to open up, Nora snaps at her and leaves in frustration. Roko catches Nora in front of her building and stops her elevator to beg her to talk to him. She insists he did nothing wrong and shuts him down, telling him he is scaring her. Hurt, Roko leaves. Nora invites the girls over for dinner, and tells them, Vito and Maša about everything that happened with Sven. Vito and Maša feel guilty, Vanessa is angry, and Nika is distressed. Tina is worried about the possibility of Sven having raped Nora, but Nora does not believe so. Nora asks Sven out for a drink where they continue the conversation they started on Sljeme. She manages to send the semi-nude pictures that he took of her at the party from his phone to her own. She then admits that she knows about GHB and threatens him with police. He drops the act, and threatens her back with his father, which prompts her to reveal she was recording the conversation, spill her drink in his face, and run away from the café. Nora and the girls go straight to the police station where Nora asks whom she is supposed to speak to in order to report an attempted rape. Offscreen, Sven posts one of the pictures on his Instagram, which makes Roko believe Nora cheated on him with Sven. Roko decides to leave Zagreb and study in Amsterdam. In tears, Nora tries to stop him. She tells him about the boy whom she lost her virginity with at thirteen; the boy would ghost her afterwards and spread a rumour that she was a "whore". Upon learning Sven drugged Nora with GHB, Roko drives away as Nora runs after the car.
20	10	"Sve ću ti objasniti" "I'll Explain Everything to You"	29 min	28 June 2025
The next morning, a panicked Petra calls Nora. Sven was at her place when Roko showed up and beat him up. When Nora arrives, both are already arrested. A distressed Petra asks if Roko's claims about GHB are true. Upon Nora's confirmation, Petra asks her for forgiveness in tears for not helping her that night, as Petra believed Nora was only drunk. Nora forgives her and they hug. She then meets Roko as he leaves the police station. He encourages her to stay away from his dysfunctional family for her own good, and asks her not to call him. Offscreen, Roko ignores Nora's texts and calls. Nora and Tina go through Nora's childhood photos, during which Nora reveals to Tina that she too had an eating disorder when she was 14. Tina tells Nora that she has not vomited in two weeks. She also advises Nora to fight for Roko. Vito and Maša hear Nora struggling while composing new songs. They take her music book and discover ten love songs she has written. After recapping all the ways Roko has showed his affection towards her, they push her to go talk to him. Nora manages to catch Roko as he is leaving for Amsterdam. Despite her attempts to change his mind, Roko hugs her farewell and says they'll keep in touch to her dismay. However, while Nora is crying at the bus station, Roko returns to reveal he is staying while the two kiss. At a Friday party, all main and recurring characters play "never have I ever", whilst alluding to the plot points of seasons 1 and 2. Vito is suspicious of Lovro's sexuality. Nora and Roko sneak out of the party, go to Nora's place, and have sex. The next morning, they rush to the coupe party but arrive when the train has already departed. Roko invites Nora to go to Amsterdam with him, and she agrees. On the train, Tina is sick, Eva finally meets Tena while sober, and Lovro follows Vito on Instagram before going to make out with Anđela.

== Awards and nominations ==
Year	Award	Category	Recipient(s)	Result	Ref.
Golden Studio [hr]	2026 [hr]	TV Series of the Year	Sram	Won	
Večernjak's Rose [hr]	2025	Digital Rose	Sram	Nominated	
Adriatic Film & TV Awards [hr]	2025	Best TV Series	Sram	Nominated	
Adriatic Film & TV Awards [hr]	2025	Best Actress in a Leading Role in a TV Series	Gita Haydar	Nominated	

== Music ==
The series' soundtrack also achieved significant popularity on Spotify, with music featured in the second season recording a 430% increase in downloads compared to the first season.

=== Tracklist ===
What About Our Deal?
"Pjesnik" – Nora / Dukat
"Vanilla Sky" – Tam and Miach
"Kabriolet" – Z++
"New Horizon" – Dyook, El Maar and Fynolla
"Do Tell" – LiL MC
"Nespokoj" – Jymenik
"Takvi kao ti" – Nina Badrić

What Are the Two of Us Gonna Do?
"Dangerous Waters" – J. R. August
"Womanizer" – J. R. August
"Gaber" – Krankšvester
"Tužne ljubavi" – Buč Kesidi
"Geto" – 30zona
"Ako me ostaviš" – Mišo Kovač

It's Not My Fault You're Lying to Your Friend
"Sa bandom" – KUKU$ featuring High5
"Pjesnik" – Nora / Dukat
"Omađijala" – Devito and Relja
"Ego" – Devito
"Balotelli" – Peki
"Anđeo" – Hiljson Mandela and Miach
"Mama, zaljubio sam se u njene ožiljke" – Baks
"Nocturne Op. 9, No. 2" – Frédéric Chopin

Nobody's Forcing You to Be Here
"Ele Ele" – Elena
"Hoodie Season" – Neeman
"Cura s kvarta" – Hiljson Mandela
"Bajadeira" – Peki featuring Hiljson Mandela
"Još ovu noć" – Hiljson Mandela featuring Z++
"Mamacita" – Vojko V
"Casablanca" – 30zona
"Mama, zaljubio sam se u njene ožiljke" – Baks

This Is Nora and She Was Just Leaving
"Ima jedan svijet" – Stijene
"She Said" – Stray Dogg
"05:28" – Salva

Nora, Relax
"Ni ti, ni ja" – Gabi Novak
"Oko za oko" – Lil Zoo
"Bottega Veneta" – Juki featuring Baks
"Sama" – Špiro and Tej
"Ovo nije ljubav" – Špiro and Tej featuring Goca R.I.P.
"Zovi advokata" – Đorđe

You Only Think About Roko
"Claret's Wish" – Zach Drory
"Pjesnik" – Nora / Dukat
"Good for Me" (instrumental version) – Ateller
"Waiting for the Sunshine" – Yarin Primak
"Keep On Bounce" – Peter Spacey
"Takata" – R-CHY
"Sijam" – Oxajo

Delete Those Pics
"Bunny" – Baks
"Na pola puta" – Skywalkeri
"Suze u očima" – Buč Kesidi
"Panorama" – Josh McCausland

I Really Don't Remember Anything
"Believe" – DaniHaDani
"Pjesnik" – Nora / Dukat
"Turn It Up" – The Rallies

I'll Explain Everything to You
"Klaviri" – Faberge featuring Klinac
"Pjesnik" – Nora / Dukat
"Mama, zaljubio sam se u njene ožiljke" – Baks
"Lanterna" – Kids from the Sky
"Romantika" – 30zona, Merula, Iggy Biznis and Džoni Paranoja
"She Said" – Stray Dogg
"Ganga i rera" – Peki featuring Vojko V
"Popstar" – Buntai and KUKU$
