= Sram (Croatian TV series) =

2024 Croatian television and web series

- Also known as: Skam Croatia
- Genre: Teen drama; Slice of life
- Created by: Julie Andem
- Based on: Skam by Julie Andem
- Written by: Hana Jušić (s. 1); Nikica Zdunić (s. 1); Kristina Kumrić (s. 2); Sandra Pašić (s. 3); Boris Grgurević (s. 3)
- Directed by: Jelena Gavrilović
- Starring: Lucija Stanković; Gita Haydar; Borna Šimunek; Severina Lajtman; Jagor Katičić; Stela Korman; Laura Barbić
- Composer: Mihovil Šoštarić
- Country of origin: Croatia
- Original language: Croatian
- No. of seasons: 4
- No. of episodes: 32 (list of episodes)

Production
- Producers: Bruno Mustić; Ivan Lovreček
- Production locations: Zagreb, Croatia
- Cinematography: Frane Pamić (s. 1–2) Tomislav Sutlar (s. 3)
- Editor: Tomislav Stojanović
- Running time: 20–25 min
- Production company: CGM Films

Original release
- Network: HRT 1; HRTi; YouTube
- Release: 27 October 2024 – present

Related
- Skam

Sram (Croatian for 'Shame'), also known as Skam Croatia, is a Croatian teen drama television and web series, and a remake of the Norwegian series Skam. Produced by CGM Films for Croatian Radiotelevision (HRT), the series consists of clips released in real time via Instagram, TikTok, and YouTube, with full episodes later broadcast on HRT 1 and released on both HRTi and YouTube, the latter featuring English subtitles. It premiered on 27 October 2024. (Note: The first clip from the first episode was released online on 22 October 2024, whereas the first full episode was broadcast on 27 October 2024 on HRT 1.)

Set in Zagreb, Sram follows the lives of a group of high school students as they navigate their social lives. The story of each season is told from the perspective of a different central character; the first season centers on Eva Šilović (Lucija Stanković), the second season follows Nora Klarić Selem (Gita Haydar), and the third season focuses on Lovro Dević (Borna Šimunek). The ongoing fourth season centers on Vanessa (Severina Lajtman).

The series was renewed for a second season, which premiered on 26 April 2025. The third season, which premiered on 10 January 2026, was confirmed by HRT on 19 September 2025. The fourth season was confirmed on 27 July 2026. Sram is the eighth international adaptation of Skam, following the French-Walloon, German, Italian, American, Spanish, Dutch, and Flemish adaptations.

At the NEM Awards 2025 in Zagreb, on 11 December, the season season received a special mention in the Best TV Series in the CEE category. Gita Haydar was nominated for Best Actress in a Leading Role in a TV Series for her performance in the second season at the Adriatic Film Awards. Season 2 also won the Zlatni Studio award for TV Series of the Year.

== Plot ==
Following the lives of a group of high schoolers, Sram explores everyday issues of teenage life, such as friendships, romantic relationships, and mental health. The series takes place in Zagreb, with the main characters attending Prirodoslovna škola Vladimira Preloga ("Vladimir Prelog Science School").

The first season centers on 16-year-old Eva, her boyfriend Jakov, and their friends. Eva is a new student at the school, and she recently broke off her friendship with Sara, whom she confronts at a party in the first episode. She shifted schools to be closer to Sara and Jakov. However, her fallout with Sara leaves her lonely and dependent on Jakov. After Jakov tells her to find new friends of her own, Eva befriends Nora, Tina, Nika, and Vanessa, with whom she forms the "Mrcine" squad. In an effort to improve their reputation, the girls attempt to get closer to the most popular boys in school while navigating their own romantic and friendship issues. Tina develops feelings for Roko, a playboy and the most popular student at school, and they have a one-night stand. However, he doesn't reciprocate her feelings and pursues Nora instead. Eva and Jakov's relationship is increasingly tested by his substance use, secrecy, and friendship with Sara, along with Eva's growing insecurities. These tensions eventually lead Eva to kiss Nix, Roko's best friend, resulting in their breakup. The season focuses on Eva's self-discovery, as she learns to define herself beyond her relationship, understand her own values and desires, and figure out who she truly is.

The second season centers on Nora, who is Eva's best friend. Noora is a fiercely independent feminist with strong convictions about relationships and self-respect. The season continues the storyline between Nora and Roko. Roko's persistent pursuit of Nora eventually leads to her developing feelings for him despite her initial rejections. However, she struggles to reconcile these feelings with her own values, as Roko's reputation and lifestyle conflict with her principles. As their relationship develops, Roko challenges her perspective and pushes her to expand her outlook, leading her to re-evaluate her beliefs about love, trust, and vulnerability. At the same time, she grapples with the guilt of keeping the relationship a secret from Tina. The second half of the season deals with Nora's experience with sexual violence at the hands of Roko's brother, Sven, and her trauma. The season focuses on Nora as she learns to trust others, embrace vulnerability, and open herself up to love while reclaiming her sense of agency in the aftermath of trauma.

The third season centers on Lovro, who is introduced in the first season as Jakov's best friend. Lovro is torn between other people’s expectations and his own inner conflicts regarding his sexuality. He meets Ivan at a party and develops a deep attraction to him. As their relationship grows, Lovro is forced to face his internalized homophobia and gradually comes to accept himself, eventually opening up to his friends about his sexuality. At the same time, he learns about Ivan's struggles with mental illness and navigates the challenges of supporting someone he deeply cares about. Through their relationship, the season explores themes of pride and self-acceptance, and the core message is how love can overcome fear, shame, and prejudice.

The fourth season is set to center on Vanessa, a girl of Romani descent.

== Characters ==
Sram cast and characters
Actor	Character	Based on	Instagram	Season			
Actor	Character	Based on	Instagram	1	2	3	4
Lucija Stanković	Eva Šilović	Eva Kviig Mohn	evaa_2008_	Central	Main	Main	Main
Gita Haydar	Nora Klarić Selem	Noora Amalie Sætre	nora.klaric.selem	Main	Central	Recurring	Main
Borna Šimunek	Lovro Dević	Isak Valtersen	lovro360_	Main	Recurring	Central	Recurring
Severina Lajtman	Vanessa Muranović	Sana Bakkoush	vanessa_secret_beautyy	Main	Main	Recurring	Central
Stela Korman	Nika "Nix"	Christina "Chris" Berg	nixotin_	Main	Main	Recurring	Main
Laura Barbić	Tina	Vilde Hellerud Lien	tra_tincicaaa	Main	Main	Recurring	Main
Jagor Katičić	Jakov	Jonas Noah Vasquez	veoma.yaki	Main	Recurring	Main	Recurring
Tin Lekić	Roko Marić	William Magnusson	roko.maric1	Recurring	Main	Recurring	Recurring
Adrian Pezdirc	Vito	Eskild Tryggvasson	vitovdje		Main	Main	Recurring
Fran Rabuzin	Ivan Kovačić	Even Bech Næsheim	ivan_kovacic01			Main	Recurring
Boromir Kovačević	Mario	Magnus Fossbakken	super.mario2607			Main	Recurring
Špiro Filip Lasić	Filip Gudelj	Mahdi Disi	filipgudelj10000			Main	
Jan Rajšel	Juraj Novosel	Yousef Acar	jura.jnovosel				Main
Ramadan Sadikov	Elvis Muranović	Elias Bakkoush	ellviiis.07				Main
Recurring cast members
Roan Vižintin	Nikola "Nix"	Christoffer "Penetrator-Chris" Schistad	nixola33	Recurring	Recurring	Recurring	Recurring
Karla Šunjić	Sara Noršić	Ingrid Theis Gaupseth	saranorsic1	Recurring	Recurring	Recurring	Recurring
Vesna Tomić	Maša Batalić	Linn Larsen Hansen	masabatalic		Recurring	Recurring	Recurring
Nikolina Prkačin	Sonja Nikolić	Sonja	sonj.anikolic			Recurring	
Jana Jakopović	Ema Sertić	Emma Larzen	emasertic13			Recurring	
Rikardo Osmanović	Sale	Mikael Boukhal	autosale.zg				Recurring
Emanuel Šarić	Idris Muranović	Elias Bakkoush	idris.muranovic				Recurring

=== Central cast ===
- Lucija Stanković as Eva Šilović (born 1 June 2008), the central character in the first season. She is dating Jakov, and she used to be friends with Sara. Feeling lonely and disconnected after drifting apart from her former best friend, Sara, she becomes reliant on her relationship with Jonas for stability and belonging. In the first episode, Eva meets Nora, Tina, Nikola and Nika at a party. Jakov advises her to find new friends, so she invites Nora, Tina, and Nika, as well as Vanessa to her house, and they form a girl gang. Season 1 follows her journey towards finding her own identity, forming new relationships, and making amends with her past.
- Gita Haydar as Nora Klarić Selem (born 26 March 2008), a girl Eva met at the party in the first episode of Season 1. She is a vocal feminist, and is extremely righteous. She supports and befriends Eva during her conflict with Sara and they become best friends. Nora is also a new student at the school; she used to live in Vienna, Austria. In season 2, Nora falls for Roko, a playboy, whose reputation and lifestyle initially seem at odds with her beliefs, leading her to re-examine some of her assumptions about people, relationships, trust, and vulnerability. The season also follows her struggle to regain a sense of control and self-worth after being sexually harassed.
- Borna Šimunek as Lovro Dević (born 8 March 2007), the central character of the third season. He is introduced in the first season as Jakov's best friend and Eva's friend. He is a skateboarder and is always seen hanging out with Jakov. At the end of the first season, Nora finds a gay dating app on his phone. He pursues relationships with girls in an attempt to hide his struggles surrounding his sexuality. In Season 3, Lovro struggles to accept his sexuality and initially tries to hide it by dating girls. When he falls for Ivan, he is forced to confront his fears and internalized homophobia.
- Severina Lajtman as Vanessa (born 7 February 2008), a Romani girl and the central character of the fourth season. She is introduced in the third episode; she studies cosmetology and attends the same class as Tina. She is open about her ethnicity and notices that Tina does not want to be associated with her because of it, given that the two reside in the same neighborhood. Vanessa in an aspiring makeup artist and has her own Instagram business account dedicated to makeup.

=== Main cast ===
- Jagor Katičić as Jakov (born 18 March 2007), Eva's boyfriend. He is best friends with Lovro and is seen spending most of time with him, which sometimes bothers Eva. Jakov advises her to find friends of her own. Jakov's friendship with Sara causes friction in his relationship with Eva as she suspects he is seeing Sara again.
- Laura Barbić as Tina (born 8 May 2008), another girl Eva met at a party. She studies cosmetology and is best friends with Nika. She wants to improve her reputation and comes up with the plan to get close to Nikola and Roko, the most popular boys at school. She ends up having sex with Roko, but he ignores her afterwards. She develops Bulimia nervosa and struggles with Body image issues after being rejected by Roko. She gets help with the support of Nora, and begins dating Mario, Jakov and Lovro's friend.
- Stela Korman as Nika (born 21 August 2008), Tina's best friend. In the first episode, she meets Eva at a party. She is best friends with Tina and she expresses interest in Lovro, whom she finds handsome.
- Roan Vižintin as Nikola (born 15 November 2006), a boy Eva met at the party in the first episode. He seems to be romantically interested in Eva, although he is in a relationship with Ines. Eva suspects that Jakov cheated on her with Sara and so she kisses Nikola at a party.
- Tin Lekić as Roko Marić (born 21 July 2006), described as the most popular boy in school and a playboy; he is Nikola's best friend and Nora's boyfriend. In the first season, he sleeps with Tina as she attempts to pursue him, and ignores her later. He begins falling for Nora after she tells him off for ghosting and humiliating Tina. He pursues Nora, and eventually becomes her boyfriend.
- Adrian Pezdirc as Vito (born 2 December 1999), Nora's cousin and roommate, introduced in the second season. He is openly gay, but Nora asks him to pretend to be straight in order to seduce Tina, hoping this will distract her from Roko.
- Vesna Tomić as Maša Batalić (born 21 October 2004), Nora's roommate. She studies pharmacy.
- Fran Rabuzin as Ivan Kovačić (born 31 January 2007), a boy Lovro meets at a party in the first episode of the third season. He has Bipolar disorder and worries that his disorder will affect his relationship with Lovro.
- Boromir Kovačević as Mario (born 26 July 2007), introduced in the third season as Jakov and Lovro's friend. In season 3, he begins dating Tina.
- Špiro Filip Lasić as Filip Gudelj (born 14 May 2007), introduced in the third season as Jakov and Lovro's friend.

=== Recurring cast ===
- Karla Šunjić as Sara Noršić (born 7 July 2007), Eva's former friend. She used to be in a relationship with Jakov. However, Eva and Jakov develop feelings for each other, and therefore, Jakov breaks up with Sara. This leads to a fallout between Sara and Eva. Sara gets in the way of Eva and Jakov's relationship by convincing Eva that she has been spending time with him.
- Mirej Đurović as Ines (born 7 January 2007), a third grade student and Nikola's girlfriend. She comforts Eva at a party not knowing that she kissed Nikola.

== Episodes ==
Season	Episodes	Originally released	
Season	Episodes	First released	Last released
1	10	27 October 2024	28 December 2024
2	10	26 April 2025	28 June 2025
3	10	10 January 2026	14 March 2026
4	10	7 November 2026	TBA

== Production and development ==
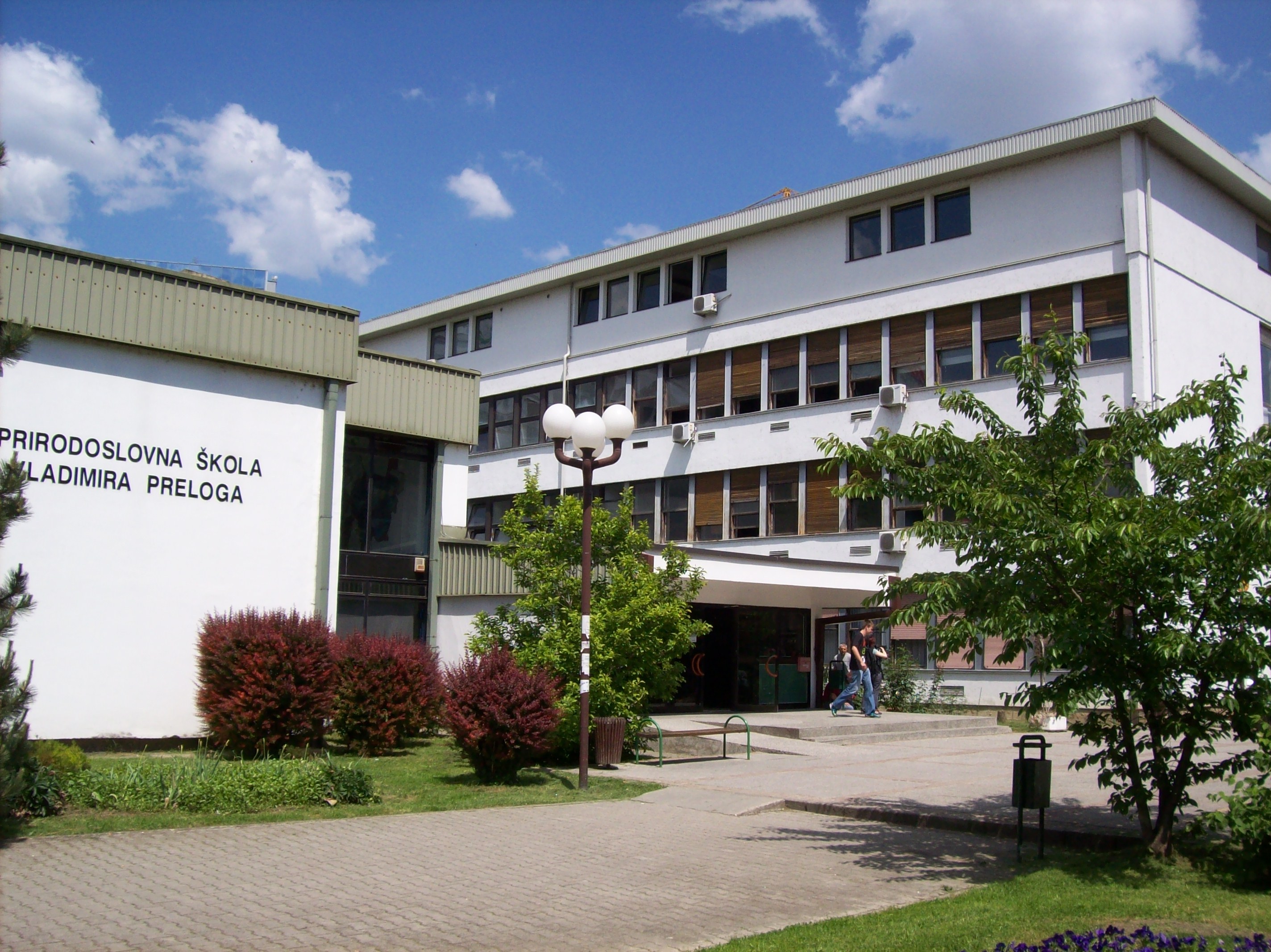
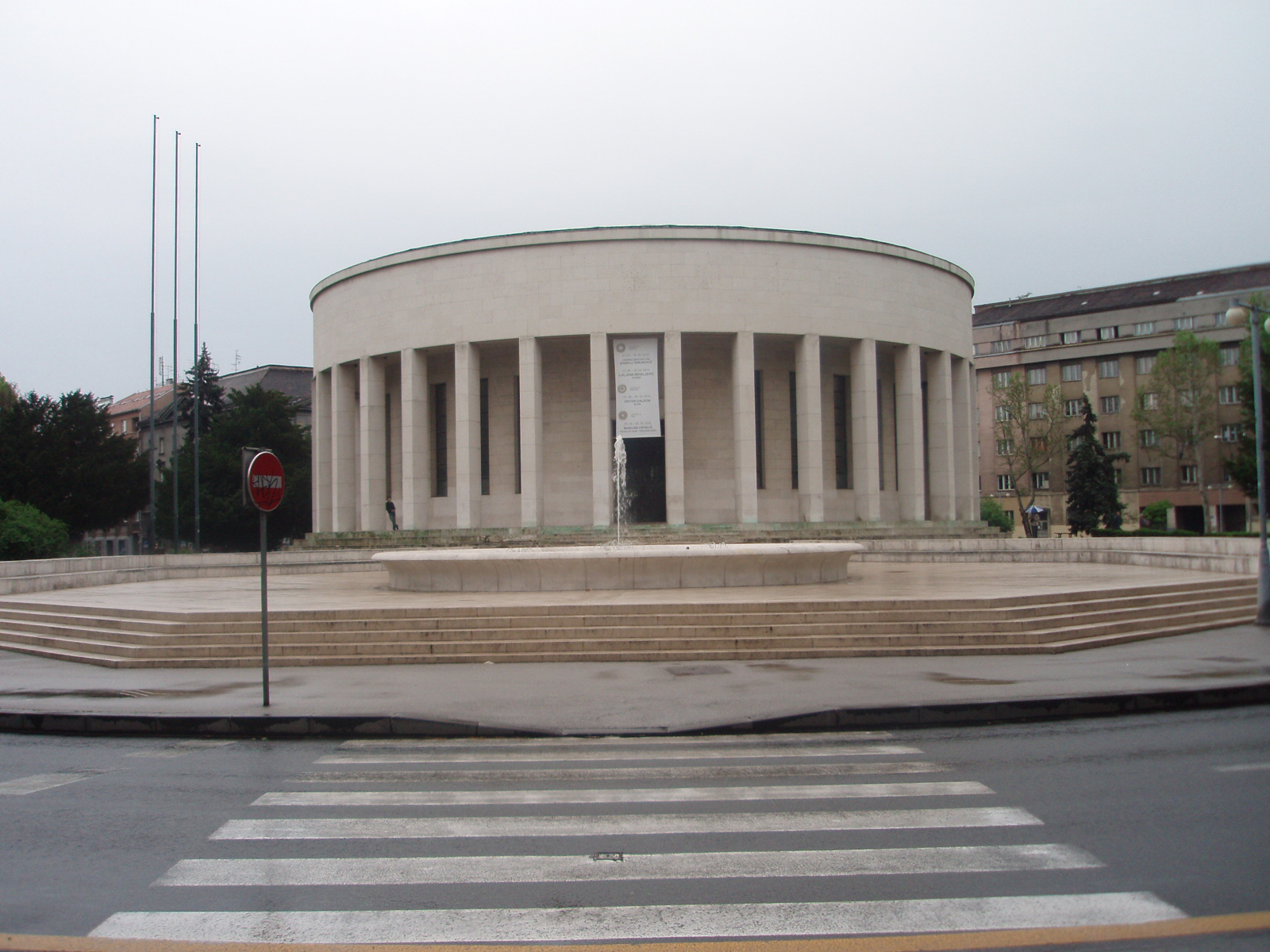
Left: The exterior of Prirodoslovna škola Vladimira Preloga, the high school the characters attend; right: the Meštrović Pavilion, located at the Square of the Victims of Fascism and popularly referred to as the Mosque, a prominent hang out spot for the characters in the series. Various scenes were shot on both of these locations.

The making of the series was first confirmed on 9 April 2024 in an article by Variety. Sram is produced by CGM Films, which obtained the license rights for Skam in early 2022. The company had previously produced The Outsiders, a Croatian-English teen drama that was released on YouTube in 2022 and received Večernjak's Rose Award for best digital content.

The series is directed by Jelena Gavrilović and written by Hana Jušić and Nikica Zdunić. The producers of the show are Bruno Mustić and Ivan Lovreček. According to Lovreček, Sram was created so that "Croatian teenagers finally get a show of their own," criticizing the lack of local television content aimed at younger audiences. Interviews with young people and expert research on their habits and mental health were conducted prior to writing the script for the series. Moreover, the producers of the original series oversaw the production of Sram; a "Skam Academy" workshop was held in Zagreb for the producers to get introduced to all of the key elements for successfully adapting the Norwegian format. The Croatian production team was also helped by the producers of Skam France and Skam Italia.

A casting call for actors aged 15 to 19 was posted by CGM Films via their social media profiles on 26 March 2024. Over 600 people participated in the casting process, and the selected actors attended workshops with the show's director Jelena Gavrilović. According to Mustić, the production also looked for potential actors directly, by visiting places young people hang out at, as well as by contacting local dance and sports clubs in order to seek out talent. "Chemistry casting" was also conducted in order to ensure that characters function well together on-screen. The Variety article from 9 April also confirmed the series will feature a character from the Romani community. In September 2024, the Croatian newspaper portal La Voce del Popolo revealed that the character was created specifically to dispel stereotypes about Romani people; it was also revealed the character's name is Vanessa. The cast was also joined by Gita Haydar, the granddaughter of Izet Hajdarhodžić.

In April 2024, it was announced that the filming of the series would take place in the Croatian capital of Zagreb. On 23 September 2024, HRT announced that the filming of the first season had been finished. Croatian web portal Dnevno reports that the total expenses for the production of the first season, which consists of ten episodes, amounted to €915,793.25.

On 19 February 2025, HRT announced that the series has been renewed for a second season. The season, which consisted of ten episodes, started filming on 25 February 2025 on various locations in Zagreb. The second season is written by Kristina Kumrić.

In a July 2025 interview for N1, producers Ivan Lovreček and Bruno Mustić outlined their plans for the upcoming third and fourth seasons of the series. Lovreček noted that the next season is "specific", given that it focuses on a male character who is "coming to terms with his sexuality." On 19 September 2025, HRT confirmed that the series is set to enter its third season. On 16 October, HRT and the show's official Instagram accounts posted a 26 second-long reel that showcased a montage of clips of Lovro from previous seasons, alluding to his role as the central character of the third season. On 4 November, HRT revealed that the filming of the season had begun, while also confirming Lovro's role as its central character. The third season is written by Sandra Pašić and Boris Grgurević. The season premiered on 10 January 2026. The teaser trailer for the season was released on 15 December 2025.

On 30 January 2026, the Romani Youth Organization of Croatia posted a casting call for exclusively Romani younger men, and an adult Romani man and woman, seemingly confirming the production of the fourth season focusing on Vanessa. The season was officially confirmed on 27 July 2026. The teaser trailer for the season was released on 20 October 2026.

== Broadcast and release ==
=== Television and social media ===
The teaser trailer for the series was released on 15 October 2024. On 7 October, Jutarnji list confirmed that each episode of the first season consists of at least five clips, i.e. sequences. The clips are released throughout the week in real time on the official YouTube and Instagram accounts, as well as on the website sram.hr. The first clip was released on 22 October at 13:43 CEST. Each main character from the series has official Instagram and TikTok accounts, where additional content is released to accompany television broadcast.

The full episodes, which consist of previously released clips, were broadcast on HRT 1 every Sunday at 21:10 CET, starting from 27 October 2024. Shortly after their television broadcast, the full episodes are released globally through the official YouTube channel of the series. Due to the 2024–25 Croatian presidential election taking place on Sunday, 29 December, the final episode of the first season was broadcast a day earlier, on Saturday, 28 December at 22:00 CET.

The second season premiered on 26 April 2025. HRT 1 moved the series from its previous Sunday 21:10 CEST time slot to a new Saturday 22:00 CEST time slot. The first clip of the season was released on 21 April 2025.

The third season premiered on 10 January 2026. The first clip of the third season was released on 1 January 2026.

=== Theatrical release ===
The complete first season was screened at the Forum movie theater in Zagreb on 28 May 2025. The season was also screened in Ivanec.

== Reception ==
=== Critical response ===
Following the show's premiere episode, film critic Igor Tomljanović, writing for Index.hr, praised Lucija Stanković's performance as Eva, and noted that the narrative structure employed in Sram is an innovation in Croatian filmmaking. Tomljanović praised the work of the show's director Gavrilović, as well as the writers Jušić and Zdunić for securing "authenticity and spontaneity of the language, [which] in turn made it easier for young actors without experience to give an uninhibited, natural performance and speech." Elle's Mia Rendić praised the show's authentic portrayal of teenagers in Croatia and their struggles, saying: "Not only does [Eva] face the problem of a new school, but she also acts like a normal teenager, bringing a boyfriend home when there is 'no one there', going to Medika and helping a girl she meets in the club's bathroom, which will definitely remind you of your own experiences."

Lucija Tunković of Telegram also praised the authentic portrayal of Croatian teenagers and made a pun that Sram is one of rare Croatian shows that don't make her feel shame: "I would much rather praise an original concept, but I hope that the experience of working on this project will be the first in a series of dominoes that will ultimately change the Croatian television landscape for the better." Writing for Tportal.hr, Bojan Stilin wrote that, "at a time when, in terms of drama series [...], domestic TV channels have no other content than marathon soap operas, it is very refreshing to see something that communicates with global reality of TV. The fact that it was made under license is not crucial in this case – if we are not already able to produce something of our own, it is better to buy it and adapt it properly." Stilin also praised the language of the show and its choice to eschew HRT's linguistic purism.

On the other hand, Josip Bošnjak, also writing for Index.hr, was far more critical of the show and HRT. He criticized the price paid for obtaining the adaptation licence, and claimed that the original series' plot isn't faithful to Croatian culture: "Is the public service, responsible for promotion and maintenance of Croatian culture, trying to convince us that... there isn't any interest for serious depictions of Croatian culture? Like, yikes! Norwegianly yikes, at that. Paid 915,793.25 euros." Tomislav Čadež of Jutarnji list criticized the series' focus on Zagreb, asking: "Do they watch this in Dalmatia too?"

Writing for Vogue Adria ahead of the show's second season, Sonja Knežević drew comparisons between the show's aesthetic and that of Euphoria, curating a gallery that showcased the most notable outfits from the first season. Knežević noted that the characters' fashion choices evoke stylistic elements reminiscent of Sex and the City.

In a June 2025 review of the second season's eighth episode, Knežević described it as one of the most powerful and important in the series, praising its raw and empathetic portrayal of Nora's trauma. She commended the show for moving beyond teen drama clichés to responsibly depict serious issues like drink spiking, emotional aftermath, and the importance of support and communication. Writing for Novosti, Boris Rašeta admitted his initial skepticism around the series' good reviews. He, however, realized that the series was of high quality after watching the second season's second episode. He praised the young actors as "surprisingly good, not suffering from stiffness or overacting", singling out Tin Lekić's "convincing" portrayal of Roko.

=== Audience ===
==== Television ====
On HRT, the first season of Sram drew up to 324,487 viewers for its most-watched episode. On the HRTi platform, the first season recorded more than 236,000 video-on-demand streams. With a reach of 9.01% and an average rating of 4.56%, the first season ranked as the third most-watched original drama or comedy series on HRT at the time.

Season 2, Nora's season, represented a significant milestone for the series. Viewership doubled, reaching 143 million views, while online engagement saw nearly a threefold rise.

==== Social media ====
According to HRT, the series' premiere episode accumulated a total of 2.5 million views across social media during the first week after its release. In the first two weeks after the premiere, the number of views on all digital platforms had risen to 11 million. By 10 December 2024, following the release of the seventh episode, the series drew an audience of 3.8 million unique viewers across YouTube, Instagram, and TikTok. The positive response the series received online after the release of the first episode made headlines in Jutarnji list, Slobodna Dalmacija, and Index.hr. By 30 December 2024, upon the conclusion of the first season, Sram accumulated 64 million views, 2 million interactions, and a combined reach of 6 million unique viewers across YouTube, Instagram and TikTok.

Season 2 proved to be a record-breaking success for the series, significantly surpassing the performance of its debut season. For the release period of the second season, CGM Films monitored social media views and user engagement during the airing of Nora's season, from 12 April to 1 July 2025. During this period, the series garnered 140 million views on YouTube, Instagram and TikTok combined, reflecting a 101% increase compared to the data published for the first season. On YouTube, 85% of the audience were women, while 44% of total viewers were aged between 18 and 24. On TikTok, the show reached nearly 7 million unique viewers, with 32.6% of the audience from Croatia, 22% from Serbia, 11.7% from Bosnia and Herzegovina, and 2% from Germany.

The official Instagram profile for the character of Nora Klarić Selem, the central character of the second season, reached 100,000 followers by the season's conclusion. The most viewed and widely watched clip from the series on the Sram HR YouTube channel is Season 2, Episode 10, Clip 7, titled "Forever, She Said", which has amassed more than 12 million views, making it the most popular clip of the series.

=== Accolades ===
Year	Award	Category	Recipient(s)	Result	Ref.
Golden Studio	2025	TV Series of the Year	Sram	Nominated	
Golden Studio	2026	TV Series of the Year	Sram	Won	
Večernjak's Rose	2025	Digital Rose	Sram	Nominated	
Adriatic Film & TV Awards	2025	Best TV Series	Sram	Nominated	
Adriatic Film & TV Awards	2025	Best Actress in a Leading Role in a TV Series	Gita Haydar	Nominated	
Adriatic Film & TV Awards	2026	Best TV Series	Sram	Pending	
Adriatic Film & TV Awards	2026	Best Actress in a Leading Role in a TV Series	Jana Jakopović	Pending	
Adriatic Film & TV Awards	2026	Best Actor in a Leading Role in a TV Series	Borna Šimunek	Pending	

== Music ==
The song "Anđeo" (Croatian for 'Angel'), performed by Hiljson Mandela and Miach, was released on 28 October 2024, a day after the first episode premiered, as the official soundtrack for the series. "Anđeo" debuted at numbers 13 and 3 on HR Top 40 and Billboard Croatia Songs, respectively. In its second week, the song reached number one on both charts. Another track, "Venera" (Croatian for 'Venus') by Miach and Luzeri, was released on 21 January 2026 to lackluster commercial success. Luzeri also released the Idoli cover "Rijetko te viđam s djevojkama" (Croatian for 'I Rarely See You with Girls') on 24 March 2026 exclusively on YouTube, after it previously appeared in the sixth episode of the third season.

Mihovil Šoštarić's curation of the show's soundtrack was praised by Tportal.hr's Bojan Stilin. He called the song selection a "somewhat realistic teen playlist of early 2020s", and said that "it would be a great shame and a killing of the show's regional potential to clinically remove, say, Serbian trap cajke from it." Index.hr called the second season's soundtrack "a musical diary of a generation". Renato Samardžić of CroL also highlighted the use of Josipa Lisac's music in the third season, noting her status as a gay icon, as well as feminist lesbian choir Le Zbor's cover of Lollobrigida's song "Moj dečko je gej" (Croatian for 'My Boyfriend Is Gay'), a Croatian LGBT anthem.

The second season's music had 430% more downloads on Spotify than the first season's.
