= Sram season 4 =

Sram
- Season 4
- Promotional image for the fourth season, depicting Vanessa (Severina Lajtman)
- Starring: Severina Lajtman; Lucija Stanković; Gita Haydar; Laura Barbić; Stela Korman
- No. of episodes: 3

Release
- Original network: HRT 1; HRTi; YouTube
- Original release: 7 November 2026 – present

Season chronology
- ← Previous; Season 3

The fourth and final season of the Croatian teen drama television and web series Sram premiered on 7 November 2026 on HRT 1, HRTi, and YouTube. Based on the fourth season of the Norwegian Skam, the season features Vanessa, portrayed by Severina Lajtman, as the central character.

Croatian Radiotelevision (HRT) announced the season on 27 July 2026. Lajtman's central role was confirmed on the same day, and filming took place between August and October 2026. On 7 October, HRT stated that the season would mark "the end of the series." The teaser trailer for the season was released on 20 October 2026.

== Cast and characters ==
=== Main cast ===
- Severina Lajtman as Vanessa Muranović
- Jan Rajšel as Juraj
- Gita Haydar as Nora Klarić Selem
- Lucija Stanković as Eva Šilović
- Laura Barbić as Tina
- Stela Korman as Nika "Nix"

== Episodes ==
No. overall	No. in season	Title	Duration	Original release date
31	1	"Sjećaš se?" "You Remember?"	28 min	7 November 2026
Vanessa goes out with her brother Elvis. While she's changing into her Halloween costume in her garage, Elvis tells her about his friend Juraj coming back from Germany. They split up; Elvis goes to meet Juraj and Vanessa goes to meet Tina. Vanessa and Tina meet Eva, Nora and Nika in a club, where they bump into Roko, now Nora's ex, and Nikola. After Vanessa asks them to go to a different club, she receives a text from Juraj. When she hears Juraj with Elvis at her place, she hurries to dress up, but they leave before she's done; she spies on them from the balcony as they leave. The next day, she experiences microaggressions from an elderly lady on the tram, after the lady hears her recording a voice note in Romani. After Eva breaks down Tina's car, Vanessa takes the girls to the car repair shop where Elvis works. While the girls meet Vanessa's brothers Elvis and Idris, Vanessa finally meets the apologetic Juraj. However, she is hostile. On Saturday, the girls return to the shop for a get-together, where Nora gifts Juraj a toy car at Tina's initiative. While everyone's attention is distracted by Elvis and the shop manager Sale drifting in their BMW, Juraj gives Vanessa a piece of paper asking her if she remembers.
32	2	"Kaj ti imaš protiv njega?" "What Do You Have Against Him?"	27 min	14 November 2026
On Sunday, Vanessa jogs past Juraj. He introduces her to Spark, a stray dog from around the shop that he adopted. Vanessa points out that a dog is an obligation, and remarks that he can't leave it. Eva reconnects with Sara, and Sara arranges an internship for Vanessa with her mum. The next day, Juraj tries to teach Vanessa how to julienne carrots. While doing so, Vanessa takes a jab at him for leaving her for Germany and cutting off contact with her; her mum tells her off for letting Juraj do the kitchen work. On Wednesday, Vanessa visits her underage cousin Jasmina who tells her she's getting married and wants Vanessa to be her maid of honour, but Vanessa is displeased by the news. At Nora's place, all the girls encourage Nora to text Juraj, except for Vanessa. When Nora doesn't know what to say, Vanessa texts him from Nora's phone, but Juraj rejects Nora. Lovro finds out from Juraj's Instagram that Ivan used to hang out with Elvis and Sale. At Sara's mom's salon, Vanessa suffers numerous microaggressions and stereotyping from her first customer. That weekend, the girls go out to a club with Juraj, Elvis and Sale. Vanessa gets upset after some guy doesn't accept her rejections; the boys, including Roko, who is at the same club, get into a fight with the guy after he calls them slurs. Vanessa, still upset, goes home on her own. When Juraj tries going after her, she chases him away. She then receives a text from Roko on her walk home.
33	3	"Ja sam kriv" "It's my fault"	28 min	21 November 2026
The next day, while jogging, Vanessa sees Elvis and Sale playing basketball without Juraj. She learns from the girls' group chat that Juraj spent the night at Nora's. Meeting up with Roko, she discovers he only contacted her to reconnect with Nora, as he wants to testify against Sven in her favour, and Vanessa was the only girl who replied. Nora tells Vanessa that Juraj rejected her because he likes someone else. On her way to the grocery store, Juraj explains to Vanessa that he only slept at Nora's and that nothing happened between them. He reveals that he ghosted her after leaving for Germany because Elvis persuaded him to, and that she is why he returned. At Ivan's place, Ivan tells Vanessa that he always thought Juraj liked her. She apologizes for telling Lovro that they knew each other before Ivan had revealed it, and Ivan admits he stopped hanging out with Elvis and Sale after crashing a motorcycle from Sale's shop during a manic episode. When Lovro, Eva, Jakov, Tina and Mario join them, they gossip about Filip and Roko. Jakov and Ivan reveal they have no other friends. The girls visit Vanessa's Jelkovec apartment for the first time. Anxious, Vanessa tries to keep them quiet, but the gathering turns into a party. After neighbours call the police, Elvis and Juraj arrive because Vanessa's mother could not reach her. The girls leave, and Juraj helps Vanessa clean up. When her parents interrupt them, he takes responsibility for the noise, claiming Vanessa was studying. After being sent home, he communicates with Vanessa through bedroom light signals, and she thanks him for taking the blame.
34	4	TBA	TBA	28 November 2026
35	5	TBA	TBA	5 December 2026

== Music ==
=== Tracklist ===
You Remember?
"Jala Brat Interlude" – Elena featuring Jala Brat
"Aman taman" – 30zona, Cunami Flo and Neloe
"Tigidi" – Baks
"Dilema" – Jac
"Zagrljaj" – Vizelj and Dzipsii
"Za moje kučkice" – 2soma
"Romali" – 30zona
"Čaje šukarije" – Esma Redžepova

What Do You Have Against Him?
"Predaleko" – Jymenik
"Sve što treba znat' o ženi" – Silente
"Jorgan" – Bofl
"Svete birtije" – Bofl
"Bolje i da ne znaš" – Samanta Malkoč
"Sranje od života" – Coby
"Omen" – Senidah

It's My Fault
"Tipi so pičke" – Smrt Boga in Otrok
"Gde ljubav putuje" – Tanja Savić
"Ako te pitaju" – Petar Grašo
"Dani su bez broja" – Magazin featuring Esma Redžepova
