= Pušćine =

- Village
- Location within Croatia
- Coordinates: 46°21′11″N 16°22′16″E
- Country: Croatia
- County: Međimurje County
- Municipality: Nedelišće

Area
  - Total: 5.8 km^{2} (2.2 sq mi)

Population (2021)
  - Total: 1,089
  - Density: 190/km^{2} (490/sq mi)
- Time zone: UTC+1 (CET)
  - Summer (DST): UTC+2 (CEST)
- Postal code: 40305 Nedelišće

Pušćine (Hungarian: Pusztafa) is a village in Međimurje County, Croatia. In the 2011 census, the village had a population of 1,289 and was the second most populated place in the municipality of Nedelišće.

Pušćine is situated between the villages of Nedelišće and Gornji Kuršanec. An important section of the D3 state road goes through the village, providing the main traffic connection between the cities of Čakovec and Varaždin. It also places the village in a very favourable geographical location between two county seats. The centre of Čakovec is located around 9 kilometres and the centre of Varaždin around 6 kilometres from the village.

The area around Pušćine is mostly used in agriculture. There are fields of maize and cereals around the village, as well as a large apple orchard between Pušćine and Nedelišće.

== Notable people ==
- Zsa Zsa, musician, grew up in Pušćine.
