= Insomnia (Miach album) =

Studio album by Miach
- Released: 21 November 2023
- Genre: Alternative R&B; pop; house; trap
- Length: 28:28
- Language: Croatian
- Label: Yem
- Producer: Lockroom; Ediba; Jan Jakovljev

Miach chronology
| Između nas (2022) | Insomnia (2023) | F4ZE (2025) |

Singles from Insomnia
- 1. "Led" Released: 21 November 2023; 2. "Tempo" Released: 11 February 2024

Insomnia is a debut studio album by Croatian singer-songwriter Miach. It was released on 21 November 2023 by Yem. It features guest appearances from Grše, Jymenik, Baks and Peki. Primarily a pop and R&B record, it also incorporates elements of trap, house, eurodance and electronic music.

== Release and promotion ==
The lead single, "Led" featuring rapper Grše, was released on the same day, accompanied by a music video. In Croatia, "Led" made its debut in the top 10 on the charts, peaking at number two the following week, marking the highest peak for both artists in their respective careers at the time. It debuted at number 21 on the Billboard's Croatia Songs chart, while it reached its peak at number 8, over a year after release. The single scored Miach her first Porin award, winning Best Pop Collaboration.

On 11 February 2024, a music video was released for the track "Tempo", serving as the second single. Miach revealed to Journal.hr that it was the last song made for the album. The video features Miach showcasing her taekwando skills. On March 8, she held her first big solo concert at the sold out Tvornica kulture in Zagreb, to promote the album.

== Critical reception ==
It was listed among the best regional albums of 2023 on the list of the music media outlet Muzika.hr, whose Klaudio Krstić praised its originality and potential, as well as collaboration between Miach and the producer Lockroom. For Jutarnji list, Aleksandar Dragaš praised the album, calling it "refreshing" and comparing Miach to Ariana Grande, in contrast to dominating turbo-folk artists like Aleksandra Prijović.

== Track list ==
| No. | Title | Length |
|---|---|---|
| 1. | "Tempo" | 2:35 |
| 2. | "Led" (featuring Grše) | 3:30 |
| 3. | "Tume" (featuring Jymenik) | 2:37 |
| 4. | "Skarabej" | 3:10 |
| 5. | "Rendezvous" | 2:40 |
| 6. | "Dance" (featuring Baks and Peki) | 3:04 |
| 7. | "Insomnia" | 2:57 |
| 8. | "Tvoje je" | 2:26 |
| 9. | "I dalje..." | 2:07 |
| 10. | "Kao ti" | 3:19 |
| Total length: | | 28:28 |
