= List of Sram episodes =

Sram is a Croatian teen drama television and web series based on the Norwegian Skam. The series is released online via short clips published in real time on Instagram, TikTok and YouTube. Full episodes, consisting of the clips released throughout the week, air on HRT 1, as well as on YouTube, the latter featuring English subtitles.

The series premiered on 27 October 2024, and featured Eva Šilović (Lucija Stanković) as the central character. The second season, focusing on Nora Klarić Selem (Gita Haydar), premiered on 26 April 2025. The third season, with Lovro (Borna Šimunek) as the central character, premiered on 10 January 2026.

== Episodes ==
Season	Episodes	Originally released	
Season	Episodes	First released	Last released
1	10	27 October 2024	28 December 2024
2	10	26 April 2025	28 June 2025
3	10	10 January 2026	14 March 2026
4	10	7 November 2026	TBA

=== Season 1 (2024) ===
No. overall	No. in season	Title	Duration	Original release date
1	1	"Izgledaš kao drolja" "You Look Like a Slut"	22 min	27 October 2024
2	2	"Vikendica" "Cottage"	21 min	3 November 2024
3	3	"Trebaš naći ekipu" "You Need to Find a Squad"	20 min	10 November 2024
4	4	"Ostavi dečka" "Leave Your Boyfriend"	20 min	17 November 2024
5	5	"Što te pali?" "What Turns You On?"	22 min	24 November 2024
6	6	"Znaš kad ti dečko laže" "You Know When Your Boyfriend's Lying to You"	20 min	1 December 2024
7	7	"Otkud tebi da ja tebe volim?" "Where Did You Get the Idea That I Love You?"	20 min	8 December 2024
8	8	"Cijela škola te mrzi" "The Entire School Hates You"	20 min	15 December 2024
9	9	"Zašto si mi uništio vezu?" "Why Did You Ruin My Relationship?"	19 min	22 December 2024
10	10	"Je li ovo closure?" "Is This Closure?"	24 min	28 December 2024 (Note: Due to the 2024–25 Croatian presidential election taking place on Sunday, 29 December, the episode was broadcast a day earlier, on Saturday, 28 December.)

=== Season 2 (2025) ===
No. overall	No. in season	Title	Duration	Original release date
11	1	"A naš dogovor?" "What About Our Deal?"	25 min	26 April 2025
12	2	"Što ćemo nas dvoje?" "What Are the Two of Us Gonna Do?"	26 min	3 May 2025
13	3	"Nisam ja kriv što lažeš frendici" "It's Not My Fault You're Lying to Your Friend"	27 min	10 May 2025
14	4	"Nitko te ne tjera da budeš tu" "Nobody's Forcing You to Be Here"	24 min	16 May 2025 (Note: Due to the Eurovision Song Contest 2025 Grand Final taking place on Saturday, 17 May, the episode was broadcast a day earlier, on Friday, 16 May.)
15	5	"Ovo je Nora i upravo odlazi" "This Is Nora and She Was Just Leaving"	25 min	24 May 2025
16	6	"Nora, opusti se" "Nora, Relax"	24 min	31 May 2025
17	7	"Samo misliš na Roka" "You Only Think About Roko"	28 min	7 June 2025
18	8	"Obriši te fotke" "Delete Those Pics"	27 min	14 June 2025
19	9	"Fakat se ničeg ne sjećam" "I Deadass Don't Remember Anything"	26 min	21 June 2025
20	10	"Sve ću ti objasniti" "I'll Explain Everything to You"	29 min	28 June 2025

=== Season 3 (2026) ===
No. overall	No. in season	Title	Duration	Original release date
21	1	"Tko je taj tip?" "Who's That Guy?"	28 min	10 January 2026
22	2	"Lik s više dimenzija" "Multi-faceted Guy"	26 min	17 January 2026
23	3	"Ne mogu plesat" "I Can't Dance"	26 min	24 January 2026
24	4	"Šta radimo ovdje?" "What Are We Doing Here?"	27 min	31 January 2026
25	5	"2026." "2026"	26 min	7 February 2026
26	6	"Jesi li se ikad zaljubio u curu?" "Have You Ever Been in Love with a Girl?"	24 min	14 February 2026
27	7	"Jesi ti ozbiljan?" "Are You Serious?"	27 min	21 February 2026
28	8	"Zadržati nekoga zauvijek" "To Keep Someone Forever"	28 min	28 February 2026
29	9	"Minutu po minutu" "Minute By Minute"	26 min	7 March 2026
30	10	""Zamisli najbolju stvar"" "Imagine the Best Thing"	26 min	14 March 2026

=== Season 4 (2026) ===
No. overall	No. in season	Title	Duration	Original release date
31	1	TBA	TBA	7 November 2026
