= Zsa Zsa (singer) =

- Also known as: Zsa Zsa
- Born: Jelena Žnidarić; 9 June 1994 (age 32)
- Origin: Pušćine, Croatia
- Genres: Pop, R&B
- Occupation: Singer
- Instruments: Vocals, piano, violin
- Years active: 2015–present
- Labels: Croatia Records, Rubikon Sound Factory

Jelena Žnidarić (born 9 June 1994), known professionally as Zsa Zsa, is a Croatian singer. She rose to fame by participating in the second season of X Factor Adria. Zsa Zsa is most known for her collaboration with Damir Kedžo on the song "Sve u meni se budi".

== Life and career ==
Jelena Žnidarić was born in Pušćine, Croatia. Žnidarić began singing at an early age. At age five her parents enrolled her in singing lessons.

In 2015 Žnidarić released her first single "Živa sam". "Sve u meni se budi", a collaboration with Croatian singer Damir Kedžo was released as Žnidarić's second single. Žnidarić and Kedžo took part with the song at the 54th edition of Zagrebački festival and won the contest with 144 points. Commercially, the song was a success in Croatia. On the HR Top 40 Year-end Chart of 2017, the song was declared the number one song, a career first for both Žnidarić and Kedžo.

On 15 December 2023, Zsa Zsa was announced among the participants of Dora 2024, the Croatian selection for the Eurovision Song Contest 2024, with the song "Probudi usne moje"; however, in early January she announced her withdrawal from the competition.

== Discography ==
=== Singles ===
Title	Year	Peak chart positions	Album
Title	Year	CRO Dom. Air.	Album
"Živa sam"	2015	—	Non-album singles
"Sve u meni se budi" (with Damir Kedžo)	2017	1	Non-album singles
"Kada budemo sami"	2017	4	Non-album singles
"Tragom tvojih tragova" (with Vanna)	2017	3	Non-album singles
"Pruži mi ruku"	2018	5	Non-album singles
"Božić je!" (with Stoka and LayZ)	2018	4	Non-album singles
"Sve što hoću"	2019	4	Non-album singles
"Zarobljena"	2019	5	Non-album singles
"Ova ljubav" (with Hiljson Mandela)	2020	2	Non-album singles
"Volim što te ne volim"	2021	4	Non-album singles
"—" denotes releases that did not chart or were not released in that territory.
