= Pocket Palma =

Croatian synthwave duo

- Also known as: Side Project
- Origin: Zagreb, Croatia
- Genres: Synthwave; Pop
- Years active: 2012–present
- Label: Aquarius Records
- Members: Anja Papa; Luka Vidović
- Past members: Bruno Žabek

Pocket Palma (sometimes stylized in all lowercase or sentence case) is a Croatian synthwave duo formed in Zagreb in 2012 by Anja Papa and Luka Vidović. Until 2019, they were known under the name Side Project. As Side Project, they have released two albums, Things Which No One Else Should Know About (2015) and Lonely Boys (2017).

In 2018, Papa and Vidović decided to rebrand, replacing dark pop sound with nostalgic synthwave sound of the '80s and starting to make music in their native Croatian. Under the new name Pocket Palma, they released an EP Godišnji in summer 2019. During the same year, they signed a contract with Croatian label Aquarius Records and released their self-titled debut album in Croatian. Between 2019 and 2025, the band worked as a trio, when Papa and Vidović were joined by guitarist Bruno Žabek.

== Early beginnings ==
Papa and Vidović met in high school in 2012 and, started making covers of songs by Arctic Monkeys and Guns N' Roses "for fun". They both attended elementary music school, where Papa played the flute and Vidović played the piano. Following their graduation from high school, they enrolled in the Faculty of Philosophy at the University of Zagreb.

In 2013, they released their debut single "Things Which No One Else Should Know About" under the name Side Project, after which they began working on their debut album. In March 2015, they released a music video for their new single "Glitter", directed by Filip "Philatz" Filković. On 4 September the same year, they released their debut studio album Things Which No One Else Should Know About. They promoted the album by holding a concert in Tvornica Kulture, Zagreb on 5 December.

In 2016, they released singles "Guns" and "Giving Souls Away". In June 2017, they released their new single "Second Skin", inspired by Zagreb Pride 2017. In September the same year, they released the lead single off their sophomore album of the same name, "Lonely Boys". During the same year, they recorded official soundtrack for Filip Filković's short dystopian film The Last Well, which was released in November. In December, Lonely Boys was released.

In 2018, Papa revealed they had dropped out of university.

== Career ==
Papa and Vidović stated that they had spent most of 2018 separated, consequently not knowing how to make music for Side Project together as they both had headed in different directions. They simply "were not inspired to make new Side Project material". During one of their sessions, they decided to translate one of the songs they had written to Croatian and thought it "sounded cool". In spring 2018, they composed new music and wrote lyrics about going to the seaside, going out of the city, and summer love in English to it. They said they had decided to try themselves out in synth pop "after Vidović had wandered to Yugoslav synth pop playlists on YouTube". In the beginning of 2019, they decided to write about the same topics, but in Croatian instead. They released their debut single in Croatian, titled "Godišnji", under the new name Pocket Palma. In May 2019, they released a mini-album of the same name. Until the autumn, they scored a radio hit "Ono što nam inače nedostaje".

After Pocket Palma's music had been taken down from online platforms, Papa and Vidović announced in October they had signed a contract with Croatian label Aquarius Records. In December, they released their debut self-titled album in Croatian for Aquarius. It consisted of all songs from Godišnji, as well as four new songs. The album was met with universal acclaim by the critics, who compared it with Croatian bands Nipplepeople and Denis & Denis.

On 31 January 2020, Aquarius Records rereleased the duo's Side Project works. On 29 February, they held a concert in Tvornica Kulture, Zagreb. In March, they released two collaborations, "Voli me" with ManGroove and "Minuta (PP Version)" with Ida Prester.

On 2 June 2023, Pocket Palma have released their latest song - "Ne mogu biti kao oni" as an announcement of their upcoming, third album. The musical group released their third studio album, "III", on 22 September 2023. This album achieved a significant milestone by securing the number one spot on the Croatian Albums Chart, marking the band's inaugural chart-topping album in their career.

== Discography ==
=== Albums ===
As Side Project

- Things Which No One Else Should Know About (2015)
- Lonely Boys (2017)

As Pocket Palma

Title	Details	Peak chart positions
Title	Details	CRO
Pocket Palma	Released: 6 December 2019; Label: Aquarius Records; Formats: CD, digital download, streaming	12
Atomi	Released: 1 October 2021; Label: Aquarius Records; Formats: CD, digital download, streaming	6
III	Released: 22 September 2023; Label: Aquarius Records; Formats: LP, CD, digital download, streaming	1

=== EPs ===
- Godišnji (2019)

=== Singles ===
Title	Year	Peak chart positions	Album
Title	Year	CRO	Album
"Daleki poljupci"	2021	25	Atomi
"Zauvijek"	2021	—	Atomi
"More"	2021	—	Atomi
"Pogled"	2021	22	Atomi
"Mene nema"	2022	36	Atomi
"—" denotes releases that did not chart or were not released in that territory.
