= Illyricvm =

2022 European film

- Directed by: Simon Bogojević-Narath
- Written by: Simon Bogojević-Narath; Saša Podgorelec
- Produced by: Ankica Jurić Tilić
- Starring: Filip Križan; Ylber Bardhi; Robert Prebil; Adrian Pezdirc
- Cinematography: Aleksandar Kavić; Jasenko Rasol
- Edited by: Damir Čučić
- Music by: Mirko Jankov
- Production company: Kinorama
- Release date: 21 July 2022 (Croatia)
- Running time: 95 minutes
- Countries: Croatia; Slovenia; Italy; Kosovo; Bosnia and Herzegovina
- Languages: Illyrian; Latin

Illyricvm is a 2022 European historical-adventure film, co-written and directed by Simon Bogojević-Narath.

== Plot ==
The film is set in 37 BC, when Liburnian shepard Volsus is taken by a Roman army unit, trying to collect taxes from seemingly conquered Illyrian tribes. Their task soon turns into a confrontation with the Illyrians.

== Cast ==
- Filip Križan as Volsus
- Labeat Bytyçi as Curtius
- Ylber Bardhi as Darmocus
- Robert Prebil as Centurion Decimus Fabius
- Franjo Dijak as Lucius
- Adrian Pezdirc as Publican Marcus Plautius
- Ilir Prapashtica as Bato
- Edi Čelić as Leonidas
- Alan Katić as Quintus
- Elvis Bošnjak as Optio
- Dukagjin Podrimaj as Dazas
- Kushtrim Hoxha as Domator
- Armend Smajli as Andes

== Production ==
The movie was filmed in Croatia, Italy and Bosnia and Herzegovina. Its production was preceded by a historical research as film director Simon Bogojević-Narath wanted to make a movie in Illyrian and Latin language which are nowadays extinct. In order to reconstruct the Illyrian language, professor Ranko Matasović of Faculty of Humanities and Social Sciences in Zagreb collaborated with the film authors. The authors also attempted to reconstruct the Illyrian clothes, weapons and culture as best as they could based on available scientific resources and in collaboration with Archaeological Museum in Zagreb.

== Accolades ==
The film won several awards:

- Pula film festival 2022 - Golden Arena for costumes
- Bahia Independent Cinema Festival 2022 - best feature film
- Sevilla Indie Film Festival 2023 - honourable mention for best feature film
- Brussels International Film Festival 2023 - best debut film
- Harlem International Film Festival 2023 - Best World Film
