= Adrian Pezdirc =

Croatian actor (born 1990)

- Born: 18 November 1990 (age 35); Zagreb, SR Croatia, SFR Yugoslavia
- Occupation: Actor
- Years active: 2011–present
- Television: Sram

Adrian Pezdirc (born 18 November 1990) is a Croatian actor.

== Early life and education ==
Born in Zagreb on 18 November 1990, Adrian Pezdirc completed his master's degree in acting at the Academy of Dramatic Art in 2014, earning recognition for his performance in Tartuffe, which won him the Croatian Actor Award for Outstanding Achievement by Young Artists. He joined the drama and dance program at the Zagreb Youth Theater at the age of 13.

== Career ==
Pezdirc has appeared in a wide range of productions at the Zagreb Youth Theater. His performances include Čarobni brijeg, (Pred)posljednja panda ili statika, Sherlock Holmes, Črna mati zemla, and Ono što nedostaje. His portrayal of David in Ono što nedostaje earned him the Rejhan Demirdžić Award for Best Young Actor at the 2018 MESS International Theatre Festival in Sarajevo.

In 2022, Pezdirc portrayed the character Sebastian in the Netflix film The Weekend Away, directed by Kim Farrant.

In 2025, Pezdirc joined the cast of Sram, a Croatian teen drama television series based on the Norwegian series Skam. He portrays the role of Vito, an openly gay man who is also a cousin to Nora, the central character of the series' second season.

== Other projects ==
In 2018, Pezdirc acted as a guide in the project Usmeni spomenik ("Oral Monument"), a performance-style walking tour through Zagreb that highlighted queer history sites. The project was based on the book Usmena povijest homoseksualnosti u Hrvatskoj ("Oral History of Homosexuality in Croatia"), and it dramatized stories from that book into short sketches.

== Filmography ==
=== Television ===
Year	Title	Role	Notes
2015	Crno-bijeli svijet	Miha	Guest role
2023	Kumovi	Šima's assistant	Guest role
2024	Mrkomir Prvi	Žutimir	Guest role
2025–present	Sram	Vito	Seasons 2–3

=== Film ===
Year	Title	Role	Notes
2019	The Diary of Diana B.	Assistant	
2022	The Weekend Away	Sebastian	A Netflix film
2022	Illyricvm	Publican Marcus Plautius	
2023	Sedmo nebo	Doctor	
