= Top lista =

Music charts in Croatia

- Founded: 9 July 2015; 10 years ago
- Headquarters: Zagreb, Croatia
- Key people: Želimir Babogredac
- Website: Top lista

The Top lista are the official music charts in Croatia and are gathered and published by Hrvatska Diskografska Udruga – HDU (Croatian Phonographic Association). Top lista is the provider of weekly single and album charts, as well as some other chart formats.

Dissemination of the charts is conducted by various media outlets such as Croatian Radiotelevision and RTL Televizija. Furthermore, Top lista also runs a dedicated website providing chart-related news and access to most of the charts.

== History ==
The Croatian Phonographic Association was founded in June 1995. During the 90's they only issued certifications based on sold albums. Their first chart wouldn't be published until January 2006 when the first issue of the Top of the Shops albums chart was announced. Seven years later, in January 2013 the first issue of the HR Top 40 airplay based singles chart was published. At that time both charts functioned as separate projects by the Croatian Phonographic Association; on 9 July 2015 they were combined into one project and grouped together as the official Croatian charts with the title Top lista. The same day, six regional sub-charts of the HR Top 40 were published. Furthermore, the combined albums chart with both international and domestic artists went defunct, while both separate charts continued to be published. In September 2018, a monthly chart with the 10 best selling domestic and international vinyl editions has been set up.

The Croatian Airplay Chart is a foreign based airplay chart published and issued weekly by the Croatian national broadcaster Croatian Radiotelevision (HRT). Since 2002 it has been publishing weekly updates of the hundred most played international songs in Croatia. In May 2017, HRT and the Croatian Phonographic Association reached an agreement where the Croatian Airplay Chart was included as one of the charts of the Top lista project. The full list of hundred songs continued to be published on HRT's website, while a shortened list with forty spots started to be updated on Top lista's website.

From September 2017 until March 2020, Top lista published a monthly top 20 streaming chart based on data from Deezer.

== Charts ==
This is the list of categories, for each of which charts are provided by Top lista.

- HR Top 100, domestic airplay based singles chart
- Croatian Airplay Chart, foreign airplay based singles chart
- Top of the Shops, domestic and foreign albums chart
- Monthly vinyl chart
- Monthly Deezer streaming chart (defunct since 2020)
