= Kod nas doma =

- Genre: Lifestyle; Chat show
- Created by: Elizabeta Biočina
- Country of origin: Croatia
- Original language: Croatian
- No. of seasons: 10

Production
- Executive producer: Denis Škorput
- Producer: Damir Hanžek

Original release
- Network: HRT 1
- Release: 18 September 2017 – present

Kod nas doma ("At Our Home") is a Croatian lifestyle and chat show television series produced by Hrvatska radiotelevizija (HRT). The series consists of lifestyle segments on home design, gardening, crafts, psychology, fashion, relationships, pets, music, and cooking, as well as interviews with various notable people.

Kod nas doma premiered on 18 September 2017 on HRT 1. The series airs on weekdays around 17:20 and usually runs from September to June. The eighth season premiered on 16 September 2024. The ninth season premiered on 15 September 2025. The tenth season premiered on 14 September 2026.

== Hosts ==
=== Current ===
- Barbara Kolar (2017–present)
- Iva Šulentić (2017–present)
- Jelena Pajić Ćulibrk (2023–present)
- Ivan Dorian Molnar (2024–present)

=== Former ===
- Uršula Tolj (2017–2022)
- Danijel Despot (2022–2024)
- Dorijan Klarić (2023–2024)
- Martina Validžić (2022–2023)
