= Aquarius Records (Croatia) =

Croatian record label

Aquarius Music Publishing
- Parent company: Universal Music Publishing Group
- Founded: November 1995
- Country of origin: Croatia
- Location: Zagreb, Petrova 138
- Official website: www.aquarius-records.com

Aquarius Records is a Croatian record label established in 1995 in Zagreb.

In addition to Record Label, Aquarius Music Publishing is a licensee of the world’s biggest foreign authors’ catalogue for Croatia and Albania, with Universal Music Publishing Group which protects and represents some of the most popular world’s bands (U2, Metallica, ABBA, The Killers, Beastie Boys, Franz Ferdinand, The Cure, Royksopp…), artists (Mary J.Blige, 50 Cent, Dave Grohl, Mariah Carey, Bon Jovi, Diana Krall, Prince, Paul Simon, Van Morrisson, Mark Knopfler, Morrissey, Bjork…) and film composers & producers (Henry Mancini, Angelo Badalamenti, David Lynch, Mark Batson, Dre & Vidal, Sturken & Rogers…). Key to a long lasting partnership between Universal Group and Aquarius is based on:– proven partnership trust – top results within the field of copyright – achieved goals in pitching music for the clients.

Aquarius Music Publishing represents the second largest household catalogue for Croatia and the world (after Croatia Records) Our household catalogue includes eminent performers and authors such as: Vjekoslava Huljić, Goran Bregović, Tonči Huljić, Kornelija Kovač, Zoran Predin, Sara Renar, Nina Badrić, Krešimir Tomac, Shorty, Robert Mareković, Sett, 3Ki, Stampeda, Afion, Kaliopi Bukle, Mandrill, Kopito, Suzana Horvat, Kristijan Beluhan, Ivana and Marija Husar, Šaban Bajramović, Haris Džinović, Željko Banić, Ljubo Kuntarić, Alfons Vučer, Hrvoje Rupčić, Barbara Munjas, Boris Štok, Eni Jurišić, General Woo, Kinoklub, Kraljevi ulice, Miach, Massimo Savić, Nola, Tony Cetinski, Šajeta, Viktor Vidović, Tamara Obrovac, Songkillers, Stoka, Lea Dekleva, Damir Urban, Cubismo and Silente, Luka Zima and many others. They license catalogues and choose music backgrounds for: TV, marketing agencies, production houses, radio stations and .authors on individual projects.
