= Silente =

Croatian rock band

- Origin: Dubrovnik, Croatia
- Genres: Pop music, Pop
- Years active: 2006–2016, 2018–present
- Label: Aquarius
- Members: Sanin Karamehmedović; Tibor Karamehmedović; Ivuša Gojan; Ivana Čuljak; Luka Softić; Lara Viktorija Ilić
- Past members: Miro Ćuzulan; Davor Čupić; Ana Vlainić; Lorena Milina; Šimun Končić; Doris Kosović
- Website: http://silente.hr

Silente is a Croatian band, based in Dubrovnik.

== Band members ==
Current members

- Sanin Karamehmedović - bass guitar (2006–present)
- Tibor Karamehmedović - lead vocals, guitar (2006–present)
- Ivuša Gojan - drums (2009–present)
- Ivana Čuljak - violin, backing vocals (2018–present)
- Luka Softić - synthesizer, backing vocals (2018–present)
- Lara Viktorija Ilić – lead vocals (2023–present)

Past members

- Miro Ćuzulan - drums (2006–2009)
- Davor Čupić - rhythm guitar, backing vocals (2006–2010)
- Ana Vlainić - violin, backing vocals (2013–2014)
- Lorena Milina - violin, backing vocals (2006–2016)
- Šimun Končić - synthesizer, backing vocals (2013–2016)
- Doris Kosović - lead vocals (2012–2022)

== Discography ==
Studio albums

- Lovac na čudesa (2013)
- Neće rijeka zrakom teći (2015)
- Malo magle, malo mjesečine (2018)
- IV (2022)

=== Lovac na čudesa ===
The cover art of Lovac na čudesa

Lovac na čudesa is the band's first studio album. It was released on 28 October 2013 through Aquarius Records, making it their major label debut.

==== Track listing ====
All lyrics are written by Sanin Karamehmedović; all music is composed by Tibor Karamehmedović.

No.	Title	Length
1.	"Na istom mjestu"	3:21
2.	"Morski ljudi, morske žene"	4:09
3.	"Zaboravi nas"	3:49
4.	"Svila"	4:02
5.	"I ovaj put"	4:37
6.	"Ne gledaj me kao da sam"	3:30
7.	"Terca na tišinu"	4:12
8.	"Molim te, zapiši"	4:04
9.	"Dragi vjerujem u sve"	3:31
10.	"Lovac na čudesa"	3:15
11.	"Još jednom"	4:13
12.	"Zimzelen"	3:09
13.	"Noćas ona nije ona"	6:15
Total length:		52:07

=== Neće rijeka zrakom teći ===
The cover art of Neće rijeka zrakom teći

Neće rijeka zrakom teći is the band's second studio album. It was released on 4 May 2015 through Aquarius Records.

==== Track listing ====
All lyrics are written by Sanin Karamehmedović; all music is composed by Tibor Karamehmedović.

No.	Title	Length
1.	"Kako misliš"	4:21
2.	"Sinoć su vatre bile jake"	3:38
3.	"I u mojoj i u tvojoj sobi"	3:46
4.	"Koliko toliko"	3:45
5.	"Rekla si da nikad nisi voljela ovako"	4:06
6.	"Pjesma koja samu sebe mrzi"	4:16
7.	"Jer te imam da me boliš"	4:19
8.	"Čudna ili čudesna"	4:15
9.	"Neće rijeka zrakom teći"	3:09
10.	"Neobranjivo"	5:00
Total length:		40:35

=== Malo magle, malo mjesečine ===
The cover art of Malo magle, malo mjesečine

Malo magle, malo mjesečine is the band's third studio album. It was released on 5 June 2018 through Aquarius Records.

==== Track listing ====
No.	Title	Length
1.	"Sve su moje pjesme iste"	5:15
2.	"Krvoloci"	3:16
3.	"Nije išla u detalje"	4:10
4.	"Kao i toliko puta prije"	2:25
5.	"Kao nekakvi stražari"	2:50
6.	"Nađi nekog poput njega"	4:06
7.	"Ti sebe ne znaš"	3:31
8.	"Dvije riječi"	3:55
9.	"Ako te ikada sretnem"	3:32
10.	"Voda ispod mosta"	3:14
11.	"Falange"	4:30
12.	"Kao i toliko puta prije (akustična verzija)"	1:58
13.	"Malo magle, malo mjesečine"	3:34
Total length:		46:09

=== IV ===
IV is the band's fourth studio album. It was released on 10 June 2022.

==== Track listing ====
All lyrics are written by Sanin Karamehmedović; all music is composed by Tibor Karamehmedović.

No.	Title	Length
1.	"Gubitnik prve klase"	4:49
2.	"Pitanje je ljubavi"	3:23
3.	"Mene moje uši lažu"	4:20
4.	"Podjela"	3:36
5.	"Molim te, izbriši"	3:21
6.	"Nikada ovako"	3:42
7.	"Idi"	4:07
8.	"Navečer se srca lome"	3:29
9.	"Milijun malih laži"	3:57
10.	"Poljubi me za kraj"	3:40
Total length:		38:24

=== Singles ===
Title	Year	Peak chart positions	Album
Title	Year	CRO	Album
"Mene moje uši lažu"	2020	5	Non-album singles
"Nikada ovako"	2021	1	Non-album singles
"Poljubi me za kraj"	2021	1	Non-album singles
"Sve što treba znat' o ženi"	2023	4	Non-album singles
"Sve da ima neki način"	2024	3	Non-album singles
"Voli me dok đavo spava"	2024	4	Non-album singles
"Onaj isti"	2025	2	Non-album singles
"Bog kakvog trebam"	2025	5	Non-album singles
"Ništa drugo"	2026	5	Non-album singles
"Prije ili kasnije"	2026	—	Non-album singles
"—" denotes releases that did not chart or were not released in that territory.

== Awards and nominations ==
Year	Award	Category	Nominated work	Result	Ref
2014	Porin	Hit song of the year	"Terca na tišinu"	Nominated	
2014	Porin	Best pop album	Lovac na čudesa	Nominated	
2014	Porin	Best new artist	—N/a	Won	
2016	Porin	Best pop album	Neće rijeka zrakom teći	Nominated	
2016	Porin	Best production	Neće rijeka zrakom teći	Nominated	
2022	Porin	Song of the year	"Poljubi me za kraj"	Nominated	
2022	Porin	Best group performance	"Poljubi me za kraj"	Nominated	
2023	Porin	Album of the year	IV	Nominated	
2023	Porin	Best pop album	IV	Nominated	
