= Grše =

Croatian rapper (born 1995)

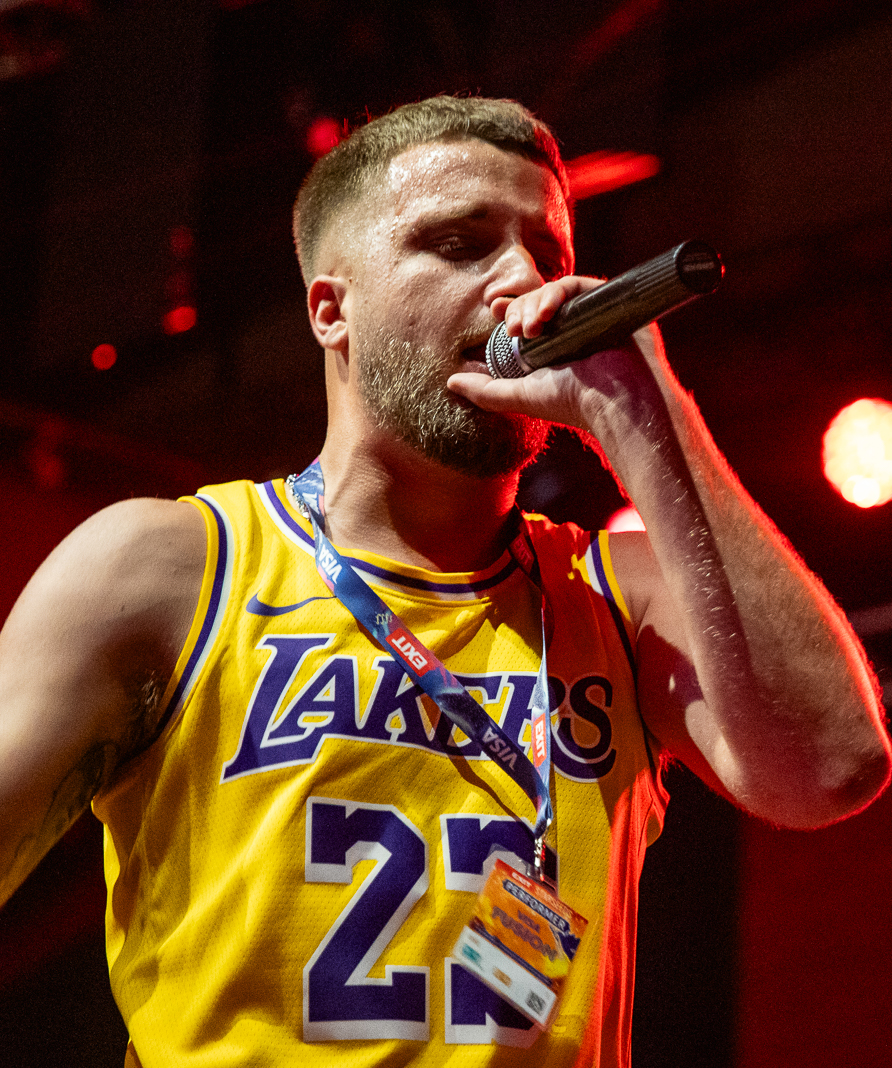
- Grše at the Exit festival in 2024

Background information
- Born: Grgo Šipek; 22 November 1995 (age 30)
- Origin: Trilj, Croatia
- Genres: trap; hardcore hip hop; croatian hip hop
- Occupation: Musician
- Instrument: Vocals
- Years active: 2014–present
- Labels: Blockstar Digital, yem

Grgo Šipek (born on 22 November 1995), known professionally as Grše, is a Croatian musician and rapper.

== Early life ==
Šipek was born and raised in Trilj where he spent most of his life. He currently resides in Split. He started engaging with music at the end of his high school education by founding the music group III. Čin with his friend Mateo Đonlić, better known as Đona. In 2016, he went to work in Germany and at the same time joined the group 6wild, where he spent a short period of time. In 2018, he started his solo career and the following year he founded the record label Blockstar Digital.

== Career ==
In 2019, Šipek released his first official single "Badr Hari" which was accompanied by the release of his debut studio album Tilurium a few months later. His second studio album, Platinum was released on 7 March 2021. The album's lead single "Highlife" peaked at number fifteen on the Croatia Songs chart, becoming his first charting song. In early 2023, the single "Mamma Mia" was released through Yem. The song debuted atop the Croatia Songs chart, becoming the first song by a Croatian artist to top the chart. It is currently the longest charting number-one song on Croatia Songs - Billboard.

== Discography ==
=== Studio albums ===
Title	Details	Peak chart positions
Title	Details	CRO
Tilurium	Released: 21 October 2019; Formats: Digital download, streaming; Label: Blockstar Digital	—
Platinum	Released: 7 March 2021; Formats: Digital download, streaming; Label: Yem	—
Dalmatino	Formats: Digital download, streaming; Label: Yem	To be released

=== Singles ===
==== As lead artist ====
Title	Year	Peak chart positions		Album
Title	Year	CRO Billb.	CRO Top 100	Album
"Badr Hari"	2019	(Note: Croatia Songs was launched on 15 February 2022.)	—	Tilurium
"Glas ulice"	2019	(Note: Croatia Songs was launched on 15 February 2022.)	—	Tilurium
"Ti si mrtav"	2019	(Note: Croatia Songs was launched on 15 February 2022.)	—	Non-album single
"Kavez"	2019	(Note: Croatia Songs was launched on 15 February 2022.)	—	Platinum
"Prvak" (featuring 30zona)	2020	(Note: Croatia Songs was launched on 15 February 2022.)	—	Platinum
"Pun kurac para" (with Bore Balboa)	2021	(Note: Croatia Songs was launched on 15 February 2022.)	—	Non-album singles
"Mamići" (with Vojko V)	2021	(Note: Croatia Songs was launched on 15 February 2022.)	—	Non-album singles
"Gangland"	2021	(Note: Croatia Songs was launched on 15 February 2022.)	—	Platinum
"Zenit"	2021	(Note: Croatia Songs was launched on 15 February 2022.)	—	Platinum
"Highlife"	2021	15	—	Platinum
"Mamba"	2022	8	—	Non-album singles
"Božji dar"	2022	—	—	Non-album singles
"Sve za gang"	2022	—	—	Non-album singles
"Sin City"	2022	—	—	Non-album singles
"Sip"	2022	3	—	Non-album singles
"Mamma Mia"	2023	1	11	Non-album singles
"Fantazija" (featuring Miach)	2024	1	15	Non-album singles
"Tokyo Drift" (featuring Mimi Mercedez)	2024	2	—	Non-album singles
"Dalmatino"	2024	3	—	Non-album singles
"Forza"	2024	1	3	Non-album singles
"Abu Dhabi"	2025	1	15	Non-album singles
"Balalajka" (with Peki)	2025	19	—	Non-album singles
"Sante" (with Miach)	2026	1	1	Non-album singles
"Lollipop"	2026	—	—	Non-album singles
"Bella"	2026	—	—	Non-album singles
"Rio"	2026	12	—	Non-album singles
"—" denotes a single that did not chart or was not released in that territory.

==== As featured artist ====
Title	Year	Peak chart positions		Album
Title	Year	CRO Billb.	CRO Top 100	Album
"Padovi" (Tibor and Flowdeep featuring Grše and Jopa)	2020		—	Pacino 3
"Bura i nevera" (Bore Balboa featuring Grše)	2020		—	Mercedes City
"Boli me kurac" (Massimo Savage featuring Grše and Đi)	2021		—	Gas Slavonije
"Šampion" (30Zona featuring Grše)	2022		—	300
"Neće k***c" (Hiljson Mandela featuring Grše)	2022	24	—	Mandela Effect
"Led" (Miach featuring Grše)	2023	8	2	Insomnia
"Mangio Pasta" (Peki featuring Grše)	2024	4	34	Fortuna
"Kamagra" (Sajfer featuring Grše)	2024	—	—	Anima (Part One)
"—" denotes a single that did not chart or was not released in that territory.

== Awards and nominations ==
Year	Association	Category	Nominee / work	Result	Ref.
2023	Cesarica	Best Song of May	"Mamma Mia"	Won	
2024	Cesarica	Best Song of December	"Led" (with Miach)	Won	
2024	Zlatni studio	Best New Face	Grše	Won	
2024	Zlatni studio	Song of the Year	"Mamma Mia"	Nominated	
2024	Večernjakova ruža	Artist of the Year	Grše	Nominated	
2024	Cesarica	Best Song of February	"Fantazija"	Won	
2024	Cesarica	Best Song of June	"Forza"	Won	
2024	Porin	Best Vocal Collab	"Led" (with Miach)	Won	
