= Piškorovec =

Village in Maia Subotica, Croatia

Coordinates: 46°25′08″N 16°34′36″E

- Interactive map of Piškorovec

Piškorovec is a village in the municipality of Mala Subotica, Croatia. In the 2011 census, it had 672 inhabitants.
