= Miach (singer) =

Croatian singer

- Born: Mia Čičak; 25 May 1997 (age 29); Zagreb, Croatia
- Genres: R&B, pop, trap
- Occupations: Singer, songwriter
- Instrument: Vocals
- Years active: 2021–present
- Labels: Yem; Aquarius Records

Mia Čičak (pronounced [ˈmi.aː t͡ʃǐːt͡ʃak]; born in 1997), known professionally as Miach (pronounced ['mi.ˈɑt͡ʃ]), is a Croatian singer and songwriter. She is most known for her collaborations with Hiljson Mandela on "NLO" (2022) and "Anđeo" (2024), and with Grše on "Fantazija" (2024). "Fantazija" peaked at number one on Billboard's Croatia Songs chart for fourteen weeks. In September 2022, Miach released her debut EP Između nas through Aquarius Records. A year later, in November 2023, she released her debut studio album, Insomnia which included the single "Led". In late March 2025, Miach released her second EP F4ZE through Yem with single "Faza" releasing day before, on 28 March 2025, on her YouTube channel.

== Early life ==
Mia Čičak was born and raised in Zagreb, Croatia. During elementary school she started training taekwondo in which she earned a black belt over the years.

She completed her undergraduate university study in International Relations and is currently finishing her graduate studies in Business Economics and Globalization at the Libertas Business College in Zagreb.

== Career ==
=== 2021–2023: Early career and breakthrough to music scene ===
In February 2021, she started her own YouTube channel, entitled Mia Čičak, posting acoustic covers. In 2021, Čičak teamed up with Croatian songwriters and producers Vlaho Arbulić and Mihovil Šoštarić and started working on her first songs in their Republika recording studio. Their first project was her debut single "23 32" which was released independently in late 2021. In early 2022, she signed a record deal with Aquarius Records and shortly after released her second single "Budi tu". "Trnci", her third single, was released in July 2022. Continuing her collaboration with songwriter and producer Mihovil Šoštarić, Čičak began working on her debut EP in 2022. Čičak's debut EP titled Između nas was released on 19 September 2022. The EP's lead single "NLO" is a collaboration with Croatian rapper Hiljson Mandela. Debuting at number 28 "NLO" became Čičak's first single to chart on the HR Top 40 chart. On 30 September 2022, Čičak held her first concert as a part of the Lil Drito Festival schedule at the Tvornica kulture in Zagreb. On 5 December 2022, she released the Između nas (Live Session) EP which includes live and acounstic versions of songs from her debut EP.

At the 2023 edition of the Cesarica Awards, Čičak was nominated in the category the Song of the Year with her song "NLO" but lost the award to Eni Jurišić and Matija Cvek's "Trebaš li me". On 8 February 2023, Čičak received a nomination for the 30th Annual Porin Awards in the category Best New Artist. The song "SMS" was released in March 2023 as a single from her yet-untitled debut studio album. Following the song's release, Čičak was announced as a performer at the 2023 Sea Star Festival in Umag on 20 May 2023. On 24 March 2023, Croatian musician Baks released "Gram" with Čičak, a new track on his third studio album Dopamin. She was the opening performer of the Telekom Electronic Beats festival organized by Hrvatski Telekom in Zagreb on 26 June 2023. On 23 June 2023, she was announced as one of the performers of the Rock&Off Festival Tour which will be held in six different Croatian cities during July, August and September. Additionally, on 28 June 2023, it was announced that Miach would be one of the performers at the Graffiti na Gradele festival in Bol, Croatia which was held on 30 July 2023. On 9 October 2023, she collaborated with Croatian rapper Goca R.I.P. to release a track titled "Navike", which was featured on his extended play Besmrtni 2.

=== 2024—present: First studio album Insomnia ===
Miach released her first studio album, Insomnia, on 21 November 2023, via Yem. The album's lead single, "Led", featuring Croatian rapper Grše, was released on the same day. In Croatia, "Led" made its debut at the second position on the charts, marking the highest peak for both artists in their respective careers. They collaborated once more in February 2024 when the song "Fantazija" was released as the lead single for Grše's upcoming third studio album Dalmatino. On the chart issue of 17 February 2024, the song debuted at number one on the Billboard's Croatia Songs chart, becoming Čičak's first chart entry and first number one single. On 11 February 2024, "Tempo" was released as the second single from Insomnia, accompanied by a music video. To promote her first studio album, Miach held her first solo concert on 8 March 2024 at the Tvornica Kulture in Zagreb.

In June 2024, Čičak was announced as the voice actress for Valentina Ortiz, originally voiced by Lilimar, in the Croatian dub of Inside Out 2. Miach performed as the opening act for Jason Derulo at his concert in the Pula Arena on 7 August.

On 25 August 2024, Miach released her new single "Iluzija". On 28 October 2024, Miach and Hiljson Mandela collaborated once again on "Anđeo", which served as the official soundtrack for Sram, the Croatian remake of the Norwegian television series Skam. In its second week, the single reached the number one position on HR Top 40, Billboard Croatia Songs and Shazam Top 200 charts. On 29 October 2024, Miach was presented with My First Music Pub award by Croatian journalist Zlatko Turkalj as part of his show Music Pub on Croatian Radio, which has been awarded since 1992 to musicians for their musical work in the current year. Miach, together with Hiljson Mandela, Grše, Josipa Lisac and Baby Lasagna, performed at the Ban Jelačić Square on New Year's Eve 2024.

In January 2025, Miach was anoncued as one of the headliners of Forestland, set to be held on 18 and 19 July 2025, together with Hiljson Mandela, Z++ and Baby Lasagna. On 28 January 2025, Miach announced her second solo concert planned for 5 April 2025 at the Tvornica Kulture in Zagreb. Her concert at Tvornica currently holds the record as Yem's fastest selling concert, selling out within a few hours. On the next day, it was announced that due to high demand, the concert will be moved to the Boćarski Dom hall with the same date. On 29 March 2025, Miach released her second EP F4ZE containing four songs, dominated by the EDM sound: "Faza", "Honolulu", "Eksplozija", and "Zadnji put". "Faza" was accompanied by a music video, released the day before on Miach's YouTube channel. On 11 July 2025, Miach released official video for her second song "Honolulu" from EP F4ZE.

== Artistry ==
=== Influences ===
Čičak cites Snoh Aalegra, Jhené Aiko, Drake, Nicki Minaj, Lil Wayne and Summer Walker as her musical influences.

=== Musical style and songwriting ===
Čičak describes her first self-written songs as a mixture of modern R&B and pop sounds. She uses her life experiences as an inspiration in her work but stated that some lyrics are totally a product of her imagination and not autobiographical. In an interview with Glazba.hr she noted how writing a song comes easy to her as she "wrote poems as a child and at one point even a book".

== Discography ==
=== Studio albums ===
Title	Details
Insomnia	Released: 21 November 2023; Formats: Digital download, streaming; Label: Yem

=== Extended plays ===
Title	Details
Između nas	Released: 19 September 2022; Formats: Digital download, streaming; Label: Aquarius Records
Između nas (Live Session)	Released: 5 December 2022; Formats: Digital download, streaming; Label: Aquarius Records
F4ze	Released: 29 March 2025; Formats: Digital download, streaming; Label: Yem

=== Singles ===
==== As lead artist ====
Title	Year	Peak chart positions		Album
Title	Year	CRO Dom. Air.	CRO Billb.	Album
"23 32"	2021	—	—	Non-album singles
"Budi tu"	2022	—	—	Non-album singles
"Trnci"	2022	—	—	Non-album singles
"NLO" (featuring Hiljson Mandela)	2022	6	—	Između nas
"SMS"	2023	19	—	Non-album single
"Led" (featuring Grše)	2023	2	7	Insomnia
"Tempo"	2024	12	—	Insomnia
"Vanilla Sky" (with Tam)	2024	—	—	Non-album singles
"Iluzija"	2024	9	—	Non-album singles
"Anđeo" (from Sram) (with Hiljson Mandela)	2024	1	1	Non-album singles
"Faza"	2025	2	8	F4ZE
"Honolulu"	2025	3	—	F4ZE
"Sante" (with Grše)	2026	1	1	Dalmatino
"Venera" (from Sram) (with Luzeri)	2026	22	—	Non-album single
"—" denotes a single that did not chart or was not released in that territory.

==== As featured artist ====
Title	Year	Peak chart positions		Album
Title	Year	CRO Dom. Air.	CRO Billb.	Album
"Gram" (Baks featuring Miach)	2023	—	—	Dopamin
"Navike" (Goca R.I.P. featuring Miach)	2023	—	—	Besmrtni 2
"Fantazija" (Grše featuring Miach)	2024	15	1	Dalmatino
"Vatra" (Bejbe featuring Miach)	2024	—	—	Glasne tišine
"Tika taka" (Peki featuring Miach)	2025	38	24	Fortuna Deluxe
"—" denotes a single that did not chart or was not released in that territory.

== Awards and nominations ==
Year	Association	Category	Nominee / work	Result	Ref.
2022	Cesarica	Best Song of October	"NLO"	Won	
2023	Cesarica	Song of the Year	"NLO"	Nominated	
2023	Porin	Best New Artist	Miach	Nominated	
2024	Cesarica	Best Song of December	"Led"	Won	
2024	Zlatni studio	Best New Singer	Miach	Nominated	
2024	Večernjakova ruža	Breakout Artist of the Year	Miach	Won	
2024	Cesarica	Best Song of February	"Fantazija"	Won	
2024	Porin	Best Vocal Collab	"Led"	Won	
2024	Cesarica	Best Song of March	"Tempo"	Nominated	
2024	Cesarica	Best Song of September	"Iluzija"	Nominated	
2024	Moj prvi Music Pub	Editor's Award	Miach	Won	
2024	Cesarica	Best Song of November	"Anđeo"	Won	
2024	Cesarica	Song of the Year	"Anđeo"	Nominated	
2024	Cesarica	Song of the Year	"Fantazija"	Nominated	
2025	Zlatni studio	Best female singer	Miach	Won	
2025	Zlatni studio	Best song	"Fantazija"	Nominated	
2025	Cesarica	Best Song of March	"Tika Taka"	Nominated	
2025	Cesarica	Best Song of April	"Faza"	Won	
2025	Story Hall of Fame	Song of the Year	"Anđeo"	Won	
2025	Cesarica	Best Song of July	"Honolulu"	Nominated	
2025	Music Pub Zlatko Turkalj	Song of the Year Award	"Anđeo"	Won	
2025	Music Pub Zlatko Turkalj	Hit of the Year Award	"Anđeo"	Won	
2026	Zlatni studio	Best Artist	Miach	Nominated	
2026	Večernjakova ruža	Artist of the Year	Miach (with Hiljson Mandela)	Nominated	
