= Trebaš li me =

Single by Matija Cvek featuring Eni Jurišić
- Released: 25 January 2022
- Recorded: 2020–2022
- Genre: Pop
- Length: 3:47
- Label: Aquarius Records/Menart
- Songwriter: Matija Cvek
- Producers: Cvek; Z++

Matija Cvek singles chronology
| "Zar je ljubav spala na to" (2022) | "Trebaš li me" (2022) |

Music video
- "Zar je ljubav spala na to" on YouTube

"Trebaš li me" is a song by Croatian singer-songwriter Matija Cvek in collaboration with Croatian singer Eni Jurišić. It was released as a single in early 2022. The song achieved high popularity in Croatia, peaking at number one on the HR Top 40 singles chart. With that achievement, it became the first chart-topper of both artists in their homecountry. It was also popular in Serbia, Bosnia and Herzegovina, Slovenia and Montenegro.

To further promote the song, Cvek and Jurišiċ filmed a music video together, directed by Benjamin Strike. It shows the duo singing the song separately on a bed mattress, in a car and in a lit room. To further promote the song, the duo performed it live during several televised appearances and many of their collaborative and separate concerts and gigs. "Trebaš li me" was very well received by listeners and critics, receiving the awards for Song of the Year at the Cesarica Awards, Zlatni Studio and Top.HR Music Awards.

== Background ==
In early 2022, a collaboration with Croatian singer Eni Jurišić titled "Trebaš li me" was released. Croatian artist Z++ wrote half of the song's music before collaborating with Cvek on the rest. The song's lyrics were written completely by Cvek.

== Promotion ==
On 29 April 2022, Cvek appeared together with at Antena Zagreb where he sang the song. The duo also performed the song live during their appearance at the 2022 Cesarica award on 13 February 2023. Cvek performed the song live at Kec na jedanaest on K1 Televizija in Belgrade on 7 April 2023. On 16 February, the duo performed the song at the Zlatni Studio 2023 Awards. Additionally, both artists performed the song live during their separate concerts and gigs given in Croatia and the wider Ex-Yu region.

== Reception ==
The track reached number one on the HR Top 40 becoming Cvek's first chart topper. At the 2023 edition of the Cesarica Awards, Cvek won the Song of The Year award with "Trebaš li me". The song received two additional Songs of The Year awards at the 2023 editions of Zlatni Studio and Top.HR Music Awards, respectively. The song achieved high popularity in Serbia as well.
