= Severina Lajtman =

Croatian actress

- Born: 2003 (age 22–23); Piškorovec, Croatia
- Occupation: Actress
- Years active: 2016–present
- Television: Sram

Severina Lajtman is a Croatian actress. She is notable for her portrayal of Vanessa in the Croatian TV series Sram.

== Early life and education ==
Of Romani descent, Severina Lajtman was born and raised in Piškorovec, Međimurje County, and has 12 half-siblings. She was named after the Croatian pop singer Severina Vučković. She attended a Romani elementary school in Mala Subotica, repeating the first grade due to her initial lack of proficiency in the Croatian language. At the age of 14, she moved to Držimurec, and later to Zagreb, where she studied Romanian and Ukrainian at the Faculty of Humanities and Social Sciences, University of Zagreb.

In 2016, while Lajtman was in the seventh grade, a short biographical documentary film titled Naša Seve (Croatian for 'Our Seve') was released, depicting her upbringing in a Romani settlement. In the film, she expressed her aspiration to become an actress, with the goal of challenging stereotypes about the lives of Romani women and emphasizing the importance of education.

== Career ==
Lajtman began her acting career as a theatre actress, starring in Pogledajme (Croatian for 'Lookatme'), a play about the life of young Romani people and the discrimination they face; the play was staged in thirteen cities across Croatia.

In 2023, Lajtman attracted media attention as the first Romani woman to appear on the cover of the Croatian edition of Elle, under the editorial leadership of Jelena Veljača. Following this milestone, both Veljača and Lajtman appeared as guests on Kod nas doma to discuss the significance of the achievement, after which Lajtman was also featured as a guest on RTL Direkt.

In 2024, Lajtman landed her first major television role in HRT's teen drama television series Sram, the Croatian remake of the Norwegian series Skam. She portrays Vanessa, a Romani girl studying cosmetology, who befriends Eva and Nora, the central characters of the series. Vanessa also serves as the counterpart to Sana Bakkoush from the original Norwegian series.

In 2025, Lajtman starred as Bogdana in Kismet, a short film about an 11-year-old Romani girl navigating cultural expectations within her community.

== Filmography ==
=== Television ===
Year	Title	Role	Notes
2023	Dobro jutro, Hrvatska	Herself (Guest)	Talk show
2023	Kod nas doma	Herself (Guest)	Talk show
2023	RTL Direkt	Herself (Guest)	Talk show
2024–present	Sram	Vanessa Muranović	Main role

=== Film ===
Year	Title	Role	Notes
2016	Naša Seve	Herself	Short documentary film
2025	Kismet	Bogdana	Short film
