= Hiljson Mandela =

Croatian rapper

- Born: Ivan Hilje; September 15, 1992 (age 33); Zagreb, Croatia
- Genres: Hip hop; trap; pop; alternative rock
- Occupations: Rapper; singer-songwriter
- Years active: 2008–present
- Label: yem
- Member of: KUKU$; Prazna Lepinja

Ivan Hilje (born 15 September 1992), better known under his stage name Hiljson Mandela, is a Croatian rapper and singer-songwriter, and also a member of a hip hop trio KUKU$.

He is the son of Croatian opera singer Diana Hilje and showed his interest in music at an early age. In 2008, aged 16, he founded an alternative-rock band called Prazna Lepinja, sang and played saxophone. In 2013, the band released their first studio album Danasutra.

Alongside his two friends from childhood – Ivan Godina (better known as Goca R.I.P.), Mislav Kljenak (Iso Miki) and three others, who later left – he founded the trap-based band KUKU$, which made them pioneers of that genre in Croatia.

In May 2022, he released his first solo studio album – Mandela Effect, which soon gained popularity in Croatia and regionally, especially because of viral songs such as "Cura S Kvarta" (translated as "Girl From the Block"), "Mbappé", "McLaren" (recorded in collaboration with Serbian rapper and singer Rasta), "Neće K***c" (with Croatian rapper Grše), "Lova" (translated as "Cash") and others.

He won his first Cesarica award for collaboration with Croatian singer Zsa Zsa for their single "Ova Ljubav" ("This Love") for 2020. In 2022, he got a nomination for collaboration with Miach on her single "NLO", which became his second nomination for that award. In February 2023, he got the prize Zlatni Studio as "one of the best new names on the Croatian music scene".

== Discography ==
=== Singles ===
Title	Year	Peak chart positions		Album
Title	Year	CRO Billb.	CRO Dom. Air.	Album
„Dona flores” (featuring Tone Tuoro)	2015	(Note: Billboard chart Croatia Songs was launched on 15 February 2022.)	—	Non-album singles
„Žene gazele” (High5 featuring Hiljson Mandela)	2015	(Note: Billboard chart Croatia Songs was launched on 15 February 2022.)	—	Non-album singles
„Katy Perry” (High5 featuring Hiljson Mandela)	2015	(Note: Billboard chart Croatia Songs was launched on 15 February 2022.)	—	Non-album singles
„95” (featuring Klinac)	2019	(Note: Billboard chart Croatia Songs was launched on 15 February 2022.)	—	Non-album singles
„Tu sam” (featuring Vekac)	2019	(Note: Billboard chart Croatia Songs was launched on 15 February 2022.)	—	Non-album singles
„Zvijezde” (Zembo Latifa featuring Hiljson Mandela)	2020	(Note: Billboard chart Croatia Songs was launched on 15 February 2022.)	—	Non-album singles
„Bebica”	2020	(Note: Billboard chart Croatia Songs was launched on 15 February 2022.)	—	Non-album singles
„Ova ljubav” (Zsa Zsa featuring Hiljson Mandela)	2020	(Note: Billboard chart Croatia Songs was launched on 15 February 2022.)	2	Non-album singles
„Bog zna” (with Stoka)	2021	(Note: Billboard chart Croatia Songs was launched on 15 February 2022.)	—	Non-album singles
„NLO” (Miach featuring Hiljson Mandela)	2022	—	6	Između nas
„Cura s kvarta”	2022	21	19	Mandela Effect
„Ankaran” (featuring Biba)	2024	1	37	Non-album singles
„7 Ujutro”	2024	18	10	Non-album singles
„Bajadeira” (with Peki)	2024	5	—	Fortuna
"Anđeo" (from Sram) (with Miach)	2024	1	1	Non-album singles
"Tu" (Porto Morto featuring Hiljson Mandela)	2025	—	12	Non-album singles
"Pa Pa Pa"	2025	—	14	Non-album singles
"—" indicates that a single didn't enter the chart

=== Other charted songs ===
Title	Year	Peak chart positions	Album
Title	Year	HR Billboard	Album
„McLaren” (featuring Rasta)	2022	13	Mandela Effect
„Gori sve” (featuring Palac)	2022	14	Mandela Effect
„Lova”	2022	23	Mandela Effect
„Još ovu noć” (featuring z++)	2022	20	Mandela Effect
„Neće K***c” (featuring Grše)	2022	24	Mandela Effect
"—" indicates that a single didn't enter the chart
