= Croatia Songs =

Croatian music chart

- Website type: Billboard's Hits of the World record chart
- Available in: English
- Owner: Billboard
- Website: www.billboard.com/charts/croatia-songs-hotw/
- Launched: 15 February 2022; 4 years ago
- Current status: Active

Croatia Songs is a record chart in Croatia for songs, compiled by Billboard since February 2022. The chart is updated every Tuesday on Billboard's website.

== History ==
The chart was announced on 14 February 2022 as part of Billboard's Hits of the World chart collection. The first number-one song on the chart was "Behute" by Senidah on the issue dated 19 February 2022. The longest charting number-one song is currently "TEC-9" by Jala Brat and Buba Corelli, having spent 20 weeks at the top of the chart.

== Methodology ==
The chart tracks songs' performance from Friday to Thursday. Chart rankings are based on a weighted formula incorporating official-only streams on both subscription and ad-supported tiers of leading audio and video music services, plus download sales from top music retailers within the territory. All data are provided by MRC Data.

== Reception ==
All the songs that appeared on the first issue of the chart were released by the former Yugoslav non-Croatian musicians, apart from "Trebaš li me" by Eni Jurišić and Matija Cvek, "Debili" by 30zona and Kuku$ Klan, "Ti i ja" by Jelena Rozga (in collaboration with Serbian singer Saša Matić), and "Highlife" by Grše, alongside "Heat Waves" by Glass Animals and "Black Summer" by Red Hot Chili Peppers. Hrvoje Marjanović of Index.hr criticized the Croatian media for trying to censor mainstream music from other former Yugoslav republics due to its alleged lack of quality, and praised the chart for showcasing what people of Croatia actually listen to. He further praised the death of genre boundaries, claiming that, "on the same IG story of the same person, probably in the same day, you will come across songs by Arctic Monkeys, Drake and Senidah", as well as the death of the "cajka problem". However, in the meantime, multiple other Croatian artists appeared on the chart, such as Hiljson Mandela who debuted with three songs in 2022, Baks, Let 3, and the most frequent Billboard dweller, Grše, whose song "Sip" is one of the longest charting songs on the chart, surpassing the majority of his former Yugoslav non-Croatian colleagues. Grše would go on to become the first Croatian artist to top the chart, doing so with his single "Mamma Mia" in the week of 29 May 2023, and stay at the number one spot for 17 weeks, becoming the longest charting number-one song since the release of the list.

Croatian music journalists generally reacted positively to the introduction of such a music chart but criticized the local music industry managers for trying to cover up the popularity of trap music. Tena Šarčević of Jutarnji list explained how the lack of Croatian artists might shock some people, but that the Balkan trap genre has dominated the on-demand streaming for quite some time. She further noted how there's a big difference between the Croatian airplay-based HR Top 40 chart, and the Billboard chart. Ravno Do Dna's Zoran Stajčić commented how the newly introduced Billboard chart is "real" and how it gives real insight into popularity of a song, comparing it to "waking up from the matrix". Goran Komerički, one of the Croatian Airplay Radio Chart editors, reacted positively to the introduction of the chart and compared the situation with Balkan artists not getting airplay with the song "We Don't Talk About Bruno" not being fully embraced by US radio. Boris Dežulović satirized the censorship that the music from the chart is facing on the Croatian radio by drawing comparisons between it and Croatian nationalism, linguistic purism, and Independence War propaganda.

Croatian music managers did not comment on the small amount of Croatian acts charting on the Croatia Songs chart and explained how the chart will help with promoting local music to foreign markets. The CEO of the Croatian Discography Association (HDU), Dario Draštata noted how the HDU is "extremely glad that Croatia has been recognized by Billboard as an important market on the global music map". The president of the Regional Association of Independent Discographers (RUNDA) explained how the chart "is great for business development and allows our performers and their publishers an easier way to recognition of their work outside of Croatia and the [Balkan] region".
