= HR Top 100 =

Croatian airplay chart

- Industry: Music
- Founded: January 2013
- Founder: Croatian Music Institute
- Headquarters: Croatia
- Website: www.top-lista.hr/www/

The HR Top 100 is the main Croatian domestic singles airplay chart, issued weekly by the Croatian Music Institute (Institut Hrvatske Glazbe) and the Croatian Phonographic Association (Hrvatska Diskografska Udruga) through Top lista. The charts are a record of the most played domestic songs in various genres in Croatia. Formerly known as the HR Top 40, it became the official Croatian airplay chart in December 2012. As of 13 January 2025, the chart was expanded to include 100 entries and has been titled the HR Top 100 since then.

== History ==
The first logo of the HR Top 40 chart, used from its launch in 2013 until 2015.

The chart launched on 24 January 2013 with the data collected from the 14th of January to the 20th of January being published in the first issue of the chart. Originally, the data from 80 radio stations was collected to form a list of the 40 most played domestic songs in Croatia. The airplay chart contained data generated by the Playkontrol system according to any song played during the period starting the previous Monday at time 00:00:00 and ending Sunday night at 23:59:59. Once a week, every Monday, the chart was published via the Croatian Music Institute's (IHG) official web page. The first number song was "Neopisivo" by Nina Badrić. Since July 2015 the chart is being is being published once a week, every Monday, through its official website. Two days prior, every Saturday, the chart is also being aired on its own show on the television channel RTL 2. Since 2015 the data from more than 140 radio stations across the country is being collected to form the chart. In July 2015 6 regional charts started being published on a weekly basis with the main chart.

With the chart issue of 13 January 2025, the chart was expanded to include 100 entries and is now known under its new name, HR Top 100. Additionally, the number of radio stations being tracked increased to 160, further broadening the chart's coverage.

== Compilation ==
There are five criteria points which are taken into consideration when forming the chart:

- Only broadcasts from 6:00 in the morning to 01:00 after midnight are considered
- When forming the chart, only broadcasts of entire recordings lasting longer than 2 and a half minutes are taken into account
- All broadcasts from Monday to Sunday of each week are included
- Only current singles are allowed to chart and a song can stay a maximum of 52 weeks (one year) on the chart
- When generating the chart, the number of broadcasts (spins) are taken into account

== Records ==
Current recorders of the chart are Vatra with song "Tango", which spent 25 consecutive weeks at number one, while Massimo Savić's song "Mali krug velikih ljudi" holds the record for most non-consecutive weeks at number one with a total of 30 weeks. Psihomodo Pop's "Donna" was the first song to which spend the maximum of 52 consecutive weeks on the chart. Savić's "Mali krug velikih ljudi" was the first song to spend a total of 30 weeks atop the chart and holds the record for most weeks at number one. Kornelija Petak was the youngest person to ever chart on the HR Top 100 chart, at the time when "Ja sam takva kava sam" debuted she was only 16 years old. Igor Delač holds the record for most consecutive number one singles; from Budan in 2018 to his latest single "Ne zaboravi" in 2022, a total of eight singles reached the top spot.

=== Song of the Year ===
Since 2014 at the end of the calendar year an award to the artist(s) of the most played song is being given out.

Year	Title	Artist(s)	Ref.
2014	"Tango"	Vatra	
2015	"Jedan dan ljubavi"	Massimo	
2016	"Zaljubila sam se"	Detour	
2017	"Sve u meni se budi"	Damir Kedžo and Zsa Zsa	
2018	"Ako te pitaju"	Petar Grašo	
2019	"Rekao si"	Nina Badrić	
2020	"Mali krug velikih ljudi"	Massimo	
2021	"Kiša (Z'naab)"	Gibonni	
2022	"Trebaš li me"	Eni Jurišić and Matija Cvek	
2024	"Rim Tim Tagi Dim"	Baby Lasagna	
2025	"Anđeo"	Hiljson Mandela and Miach	

== List of number-one songs ==
- List of Croatian airplay number-one songs of 2025
