= Love Island (franchise) =

Reality dating show franchise

- Created by: ITV Studios
- Original work: Love Island (2005 TV series); Love Island (2015 TV series)
- Owners: ITV Studios (2005–); GroupM Motion Entertainment (2015–)
- Years: 2005–present

Films and television
- Television series: Love Island (independent international versions, see below)

Games
- Video game: Love Island: The Game

Miscellaneous
- Genre: Dating; Reality

Love Island is a dating reality show that originated in the United Kingdom in 2005 as Celebrity Love Island. Created by ITV Studios, it has spawned a second British version in 2015 as well as several international versions.

The show features a group of single contestants, known as "islanders" who are sourced from agencies, and live together in a specially constructed villa that is isolated from the outside world. All of this is in an attempt to find love. The islanders are constantly monitored during their stay in the house by live television cameras as well as personal audio microphones. The Islanders will also compete in different challenges throughout the series which allows them to gain insight on the public's opinion on them and gain insight on what the islanders have been saying about each other. Throughout the series, the contestants "couple up" to avoid being dumped from the villa. Additionally, the public will vote for their favourite islanders to stay in the villa at points in the series. As old islanders are dumped, new islanders enter the villa. At the end of the season, the public vote one final time to determine the winning couple.

== International versions ==
Legend:

Currently airing franchise
Franchise with an upcoming season
Franchise no longer airing
Upcoming franchise
Status unknown

Country/Region	Title	Network	Seasons and winners	Presenter(s)	Narrator(s)
Albania	Love Island Albania	TV Klan	Season 1, 2023: Arlind Gashi & Ueda Ndrecaj	Luana Vjollca	Genti Deçka
Australia	Love Island Australia	Current; 9Now (4-); Former; 9Go! (1); Nine Network (2–3)	Season 1, 2018: Grant Crapp & Tayla Damir; Season 2, 2019: Josh Packham & Anna McEvoy; Season 3, 2021: Mitch Hibberd & Tina Provis; Season 4, 2022: Austen Bugeja & Claudia Bonifazio; Season 5, 2023: Kale Roberts & Tyra Johannes; Season 6, 2024: Em Miguel Leigh & Mercedes Knox; Season 7, 2025: Kye Lambert & Yana Marks; Season 8, 2026: Current season	Sophie Monk	Current; Eoghan McDermott (1–2, 4–); Former; Stephen Mullan (3)
Canada (Quebec)	L'île de l'amour	TVA	Season 1, 2021: Arielle Salvaje & Benjamin Fabre; Season 2, 2022: Amanda Boily Paleovrahas & Mathieu Dufresne; Season 3, 2023: Lorie Boucher & Hugo Brochu	Naadei Lyonnais (1- 2); Olivier Dion (3)	Mehdi Bousaidan (1–2); Geneviève Schmidt (3)
Croatia; Serbia; Slovenia	Love Island Adria	Voyo; RTL; Pop TV; Prva	Season 1, 2026: Teodora "Drina" Jevđović & Valentin Stets	Dragana Mićalović	Saša Lozar; Filip Ugrenović
Czech Republic; Slovakia	Love Island Česko & Slovensko	(Czech Republic) TV Nova; (Slovakia) TV Markíza	Season 1, 2021: Martin Kulhánek & Laura Chrebetová; Season 2, 2022: Denisa Valová & Kryštof Novák; Season 3, 2023: Mária Glatzová & Christopher Jirout; Season 4, 2024: Kristína Víglaská & Michal Trabalík; Season 5, 2025: Honzi Michálek & Patricie Herlíková; Season 6, 2026: Current season	Current; Zorka Hejdová (2-); Former; Nikol Moravcová (1)	Václav Matějovský
Denmark	Love Island	Current; Viaplay (2-); Former; TV3 (1)	Season 1, 2018: Julie Melsen & Oliver Erngart; Season 2, 2025: Dina Mary & Oliver Wollenberg	Current; Carla Mickelborg (2-); Former; Lisbeth Østergaard (1)	Current; TBA (2-); Former; Dan Anderson (1)
Finland	Love Island Suomi	Current; MTV3 (4-); MTV Katsomo (4-); Former; Sub (1-2); AVA (3)	Season 1, 2018: Aura Lampi & Jeffrey Lawman; Season 2, 2019: Eetu Tanskanen & Sofia Näveri; Season 3, 2021: Eeli Ylilehto & Salli Leppäkoski; Season 4, 2023: Elviira Fält & Paulus Pitkälä; Season 5, 2025: Henri Niironen & Julia Matilainen; Season 6, 2026: Ilmari Lehtinen & Jenni Seppä; Season 7, 2027: Upcoming season	Current; Niko Saarinen (5–); Former; Veronica Verho (3–4); Shirly Karvinen (1–2)	Current; Tomi Haustola (4-); Former; Riku Sottinen (1–3)
France	Love Island France	Prime Video France (1); RTL-TVI (1); W9 (2)	Season 1, 2020: Angele Salentino & Tristan Mrs; Season 2, 2023: Cindy Miranda & Edgar Ulrich	Nabilla Benattia (1); Delphine Wespiser (2)	Quentin Thebault (1); Dycosh (2)
Germany	Love Island – Heiße Flirts & wahre Liebe	RTL Zwei	Season 1, 2017: Elena Miras & Jan Sokolowsky; Season 2, 2018: Marcellino "Lino" Kremers & Tracy Candela; Season 3, 2019: Sidney Wolf & Vivien Michalla; Season 4, 2020: Melina Hoch & Tim Kuehnel; Season 5, Spring 2021: Bianca Jule & Paco Harb; Season 6, Fall 2021: Isabell Kremer & Robin Wii; Season 7, 2022: Nico Einfech & Jennifer Iglesias; Season 8, 2023: Jenny Grassl & Luca Müller	Jana Ina (1–5); Sylvie Meis (6–8); Oliver Petszokat (8)	Christoph Kröger (1–2); Simon Beeck (3–8)
Germany	Love Island VIP	RTL Zwei	Season 1, 2024: Chiara Frohlich & Patrick Fabian; Season 2, 2025: Stella Stegmann & Josh Stanley; Season 3, 2026: Upcoming season	Sylvie Meis	Simon Beeck
Greece	Love Island	Skai TV	Season 1, 2022: Argiris Fragkos & Maria Astoglou	Iliana Papageorgiou	Vangelis Giannopoulos
Hungary	Love Island Hungary	RTL Klub	Season 1, 2019: Tícián Lakatos & Zsófia "Zsófi" Németh	Norbert Kamarás (Lajos Bíró)	Ádám Gacsal
Israel	Love Island	Free TV	Season 1, 2024: David Schraer & Kim Vinakor	Eden Fines	TBA
Italy	Love Island Italia	Discovery+	Season 1, 2021: Rebeca Di Filippo & Wolf Yevhen	Giulia De Lellis	
Malta	Love Island Malta	TVM	Season 1, 2023: Allen Piscopo & Chelsea Bagnall-Falzon; Season 2, 2024: Clinton King & Tamika Ross; Season 3, 2025: Evelyn & Matthew Micallef; Season 4, 2026: Anna Paola & Luke Grima	Current; Giselle Spiteri (3-); Former; Yazmin Helledie (1-2)	Chucky Bartolo
Netherlands	Love Island Nederland & België (with Belgium)	Current; Videoland (3–); Streamz (3–); Former; RTL 5 (1–2); VIER (1–2)	Season 1, 2019: Alexandra Jakobczyk & Denzel Slager; Season 2, 2020: Joan Pronk & Mert O'Katann; Season 3, 2022: Cas Hooijer & Jotti Verbruggen; Season 4, 2023: Kengi Meert & Kimmy de Weerd	Holly Mae Brood; Viktor Verhulst	Current; Jeroen Verdick; Sander Lantinga (2-); Former; Kaj van der Ree (1)
Netherlands	Love Island Nederland	Videoland	Season 1, 2019: Daniel van Pienbroek & Floor Masselink; Season 2, 2021: Esmee Cox & Job Stevens	Monica Geuze (1) Holly Mae Brood (2)	Kaj van der Ree (1) Sander Lantinga (2)
New Zealand	Love Island NZ	Three	Season 1, TBA: New Series	TBA	TBA
Nigeria	Love Island Nigeria	ONTV Soundcity Spice	Season 1, TBA: New Series	TBA	TBA
Norway	Love Island Norway	Current; VGTV (5–); Former; TV3 (1); TV 2 (2–4)	Season 1, 2018: Andrea Sveinsdottir & Morten Dalhaug; Season 2, 2020: Johannes Klemp & Nora Haukland; Season 3, 2024: Elisabeth Henriksen Reither & Henrik Fossedal; Season 4, 2025: Camilla De Souza Devik & Nicklas Sundsvåg; Season 5, 2027: Upcoming season	Current; Sophie Elise Isachsen (5–); Former; Tone Damli (1); Morten Hegseth (2); Alexandra Joner (3–4)	Current; TBA (5–); Former; Rasmus Wold (1); Egil Skurdal (2–4)
Poland	Love Island. Wyspa miłości	Current; TV4 (7-); Former; Polsat (1–6)	Season 1, 2019: Mikołaj Jędruszczak & Sylwia Madeńska; Season 2, 2020: Dominik Grot & Julia Nowakowska; Season 3, 2021: Caroline Juchniewicz & Mateusz Zacharczuk; Season 4, 2021: Magdalena Lichota & Wiktor Biernacki; Season 5, 2022: Jakub Galica & Josie Kwaśniewska; Season 6, 2022: Aleksandr Muzheiko & Angelina Zaichenko; Season 7, 2023: Agata Paź & Hubert Wicher; Season 8, 2023: Armin Pawlak & Laura Gołaszewska; Season 9, 2024: Jarek Mrozowski & Zuzanna Maciejewska	Karolina Gilon	Current; Maciej Kasprzyk (2–); Former; Krzysztof Unrug (1)
Romania	Love Island România	Pro TV, Voyo	Season 1, 2023: Adrian Butușină & Anne-Marie Dan	Alina Ceușan	Dragoș Răduță
Spain	Love Island España	Neox	Season 1, 2021: Celia Zanón & Miguel López; Season 2, 2022: Luis Titans & Yaiza Caballot	Cristina Pedroche	
South Africa	Love Island South Africa	M-Net	Season 1, 2021: Libho Geza & Thimna Shooto	Leandie du Randt	
Sweden	Love Island Sweden	TV4	Season 1, 2018: Jacob Olsson & Victoria Eklund Gustafsson; Season 2, 2019: Simon Dannert & Sofia Jenks; Season 3, 2023: Adrian Podde & Celine Axman; Season 4, 2025: Emil Renmarker & Olivia Svensson; Season 5, 2026: Charlie Wågberg & Elin Kihl; Season 6, 2027: Upcoming season	Current; Oscar Zia (6–); Former; Malin Stenbäck (1–2); Julia Franzén (3); Johanna Nordström (4–5)	Current; Torbjörn Averås Skorup (4-); Former
United Kingdom	Celebrity Love Island	ITV	Season 1, 2005: Fran Cosgrave & Jayne Middlemiss; Season 2, 2006: Bianca Gascoigne & Calum Best	Patrick Kielty (1–2); Kelly Brook (1); Fearne Cotton (2)	
United Kingdom	Love Island	ITV2	Season 1, 2015: Jess Hayes & Max Morley; Season 2, 2016: Cara de la Hoyde & Nathan Massey; Season 3, 2017: Amber Davies & Kem Cetinay; Season 4, 2018: Dani Dyer & Jack Fincham; Season 5, 2019: Amber Gill & Greg O'Shea; Season 6, 2020: Finn Tapp & Paige Turley; Season 7, 2021: Millie Court & Liam Reardon; Season 8, 2022: Davide Sanclimenti & Ekin-Su Cülcüloğlu; Season 9, Winter 2023: Kai Fagan & Sanam Harrinanan; Season 10, Summer 2023: Jess Harding & Sammy Root; Season 11, 2024: Josh Oyinsan & Mimii Ngulube; Season 12, 2025: Cach Mercer & Toni Laites; Season 13, 2026: Julia Majchrzak & Lorenzo Alessi	Current; Maya Jama (9–) Former; Caroline Flack (1–5); Laura Whitmore (6–8)	Iain Stirling
United Kingdom	Love Island: All Stars	ITV2	Season 1, 2024: Molly Smith & Tom Clare; Season 2, 2025: Casey O'Gorman & Gabby Allen; Season 3, 2026: Ciaran Davies & Samie Elishi	Maya Jama	Iain Stirling
United States	Love Island USA	Current Peacock (4–) Crave (4–) Former CBS (1–3) CTV (1–3)	Season 1, 2019: Elizabeth Weber & Zac Mirabelli; Season 2, 2020: Caleb Corprew & Justine Ndiba; Season 3, 2021: Korey Gandy & Olivia Kaiser; Season 4, 2022: Timmy Pandolfi & Zeta Morrison; Season 5, 2023: Hannah Wright & Marco Donatelli; Season 6, 2024: Kordell Beckham & Serena Page; Season 7, 2025: Amaya Espinal & Bryan Arenales; Season 8, 2026: Bryce Alakai & Trinity Tatum; Season 9, 2027: Upcoming season	Current; Ariana Madix (6–) Former; Arielle Vandenberg (1–3); Sarah Hyland (4–5)	Current; Iain Stirling (4–) Former; Matthew Hoffman (1–3)
United States	Love Island Games	Peacock	Season 1, 2023: Jack Fowler & Justine Ndiba; Season 2, 2025: Isaiah "Zay" Campbell & Lucinda Strafford; Season 3, 2027: Upcoming season	Current; Ariana Madix (2—); Former; Maya Jama (1)	Iain Stirling

On 11 September 2017, a German version of Love Island premiered on RTL II. An Australian version was commissioned by the Nine Network for its secondary channel 9Go! and internationally it airs on ITVBe and 3e with international streaming available on Hulu and ITVX. On 8 August 2018, CBS ordered an American version of the show.

The Dutch-Flemish version was cancelled after one season in 2019, alongside Temptation Island and Free Love Paradise, as a result of a sexual assault scandal in one of RTL's other reality series De Villa.

On 21 September 2020, it was announced by ITV Studios that a Spanish version of the show and a Nigerian version of the show were both in pre-production. The Nigerian version was commissioned by Digital Play Networks and will air on TVC and 9 Vision Media in Nigeria. The Spanish version was commissioned by Atresmedia and will air on Neox in Spain.

On 6 November 2020, South African TV Network M-Net ordered a South African version of the show, which premiered on 28 February 2021.

November 1, 2023, the first episode of Love Island Games was released. Consisting of all prior Love Island contestants, giving them a second chance at love and winning a $100,000 prize.

== Locations ==
All versions of Love Island have been shot in villas located around the world.

Table key
Current location
Former location

Location		(Albania)	(Australia)	(Canada) (FR)	(Croatia) (Serbia) (Slovenia)	(Czech Republic) (Slovakia)	(Denmark)	(Finland)	(France) (Wallonia)	(Germany)	(Greece)	(Hungary)	(Israel)	(Italy)	(Netherlands) (Flanders)	(Netherlands)	(Nigeria)	(Norway)	(Poland)	(Romania)	(South Africa)	(Spain)	(Sweden)	(United Kingdom) (Republic of Ireland) (2005)	(United Kingdom) (Republic of Ireland) (2015)	(United States) (EN) (Canada) (EN)
Albania	Palasë	Yes																								
Argentina	Buenos Aires																	No (Note: Former location)								
Australia	Byron Bay		No																							
Cyprus	Paphos											Yes											Yes (Note: Current location)			
Fiji			Yes																					Yes		Yes
Greece	Corfu									Yes			Yes										No			
Mexico	Los Cabos			Yes																			No			
South Africa	Cape Town								Yes												Yes				Yes (Note: Winter series)	
Spain	Estepona							Yes																		
Spain	Gran Canaria					No	Yes							Yes	Yes	No		Yes				Yes				
Spain	Mallorca		No							No															Yes (Note: Summer series)	
Spain	Marbella							No								Yes			Yes							
Spain	Tenerife				Yes	Yes					Yes									Yes						
United States	Las Vegas																									No
United States	Nīnole																									No
United States	Santa Barbara																									No

== See also ==
- Love Island: Beyond the Villa
- MTV Splitsvilla, similar 2008 Indian show
- The Real Love Boat, similar American and Australian show
- My Mum, Your Dad, British show for mid-life/middle-aged parents, British version of the American show of a similar name, but loosely inspired by Love Island
