= Shadow Ridge High School (Nevada) =

Location
- 5050 Brent Lane; Las Vegas, Nevada 89131; United States; 36.31884°N 115.21024°W

Information
- Type: Public
- Motto: First in Spirit, First in Pride
- Established: 2002
- Principal: Traci Kannon
- Teaching staff: 127.00 (on an FTE basis)
- Enrollment: 3,119 (2023-2024)
- Student to teacher ratio: 25.56
- Colors: Navy, Gray
- Team name: Mustangs
- Rivals: Arbor View High School
- Website: www.srhsmustangs.com

Shadow Ridge High School is a public high school in Las Vegas, Nevada, United States. It was established in 2002 and opened in August 2003. The first graduating class in the high school graduated in June 2005. The school is a part of Clark County School District.

== Academics and accomplishments ==
- In the 2009-2010 school year, twenty-nine students received the Presidential Award of Academic Excellence
- In the 2008-2009 school year, $1,560,000.00 in Governor Guinn Millennium Scholarships were awarded
- In the 2009-2010 school year, SRHS Air Force ROTC was designated as "Distinguished Unit."
- In the 2010-2011 school year, Shadow Ridge Science Bowl Team placed 7th out of 32 teams at the Nevada Regional Science Bowl Competition and received a prize check of $300.00.

== Advanced Placement classes ==
- Students have the opportunity to take Advanced Placement courses sponsored by College Board to gain college credit before graduation. Classes offered include: Biology, Chemistry, U.S. Government, World History, U.S. History, Psychology, English Literature, English Language, Studio Art, Calculus, and Spanish Language. However, due to Clark County's budget cuts and financial difficulties, AP classes have been largely limited due to the quota of 25 students needed to pilot each AP class. With the average class size being 30 students, it is nearly unfeasible to garner enough students for an AP class. Participation in the AP program is largely voluntary and so AP class size turnouts tend to be low.
- Through the Jumpstart Dual Credit High School Program, students may also take dual-enrollment courses which grant both graduation credits and CSN credits.

== Notable alumni ==
- Bryce Alakai, winner of the eighth season of Love Island USA
- Dia Frampton, singer-songwriter of band Meg & Dia
- Damian Jackson, Canadian Football League, fullback for the Winnipeg Blue Bombers
- Korey Toomer, National Football League, linebacker
- Ryan Van Bergen, defensive lineman, University of Michigan and NFL's Carolina Panthers
