= Cal Grant =

California financial student aid program

Cal Grant is a financial aid program administrated by the California Student Aid Commission (CSAC) providing aid to California undergraduates, vocational training students, and those in teacher certification programs. Cal Grants are the largest source of California state funded student financial aid.

== Description ==
Cal Grant gives funds to students who meet grade point average and parent income requirements. Up to $12,630 a year is available to qualifying students which can be applied to tuition, room and board, or books and other supplies. Cal Grant applicants must file FAFSA or California Dream Application between October 1 and March 2 each year, along with the Cal Grant GPA verification Form. Students that do not have a high school GPA to submit (such as students that were homeschooling, attended charter school or have a GED) may substitute their GED, ACT, or SAT scores.

== Requirements ==
- Submit the FAFSA or California Dream Application and your verified Cal Grant GPA by the deadline
- Be a U.S. citizen or eligible non-citizen (your parents don’t need to be citizens or eligible noncitizens)
- Be a California resident when you graduated from high school or exempt from non-resident tuition (AB 540)
- Attend a qualifying California college
- Not have a bachelor’s or professional degree (except for Cal Grant A and B extended awards for a teaching credential program)
- Have financial need based on your college costs
- Have family income and assets below the established ceilings
- Meet any minimum GPA requirements
- Be in a program leading to an undergraduate degree or certificate
- Be enrolled at least half time
- Have registered with U.S. Selective Service (most males)
- Not owe a refund on a state or federal grant, or be in default on a student loan

== Types of Cal Grants ==
=== Cal Grant A ===
This award may be applied to tuition and other fees at public or private colleges for students working towards an associate's or bachelor's degree. In the 2018-19 school year, the grant covers $5,742 at California State Universities and $12,570 at University of California schools. Up to $9,084 is given to students attending a private school.

=== Cal Grant B ===
This award is given to low income students as a living allowance and partial tuition assistance. First year students are given up to $1,672 for books and living expenses; after that the awards are the same as Cal Grant A. As of 2019 the grant increased up to 6,000 a year due to a new bill passed July 2019. Beginning in 2019‑20, Cal Grant recipients with dependent children qualify for larger access awards (of up to about $6,000 per year) at the public segments (UC, CSU, and CCC). Cal Grant recipients enrolling full time at CCC also qualify for additional aid (of up to $4,000 per year) through the Student Success Completion Grant. To be eligible for this grant the student must be engaging in at least one academic year of courses.

=== Cal Grant C ===
This award provides assistance for tuition at occupational or career colleges. $547 is available for books and equipment and is available at any California Community College. The vocational program must be at least four months in length but not more than two years.

=== Cal Grant A Competitive Award ===
For students that did not qualify for the regular Cal Grant A, this award is available, but not guaranteed, to all that meet the minimum eligibility requirements. The student must have a minimum GPA of 3.0 and be from a low to middle income family. This award helps with tuition and fees at qualifying schools with programs of more than two years.

=== Cal Grant B Competitive Award ===
Students must have a minimum GPA of 2.0 and are from a disadvantaged or low income family. The money may be used for tuition and access costs at eligible schools with programs of more than one year in length. The first year, this grant can only be used for access costs like living expenses, transportation, supplies and books. Starting with the second year, this award may also be applied to tuition.

== See also ==
- Other state-sponsored scholarship in the U.S.
- Bright Futures Scholarship Program in Florida
- HOPE Scholarship in Georgia
- Nevada Millennium Scholarship in Nevada
