= Love Island România season 1 =

Love Island România
- Season 1

Release
- Original network: Pro TV; Voyo
- Original release: 1 October – 10 November 2023

The first series of Love Island România is set to begin broadcasting on 1 October 2023 on Pro TV and Voyo. Alina Ceușan hosted the series while Dragoș Răduță provided voice-over narration.

On 10 November 2023 the series was won by Adrian Butușină and Anne-Marie Dan, with Călin Băcănici and Denisa as runners-up

== Format ==
Love Island is a reality television program in which a group of contestants, who are referred to as "Islanders", are living in a villa in Tenerife. The Islanders are cut off from the outside world and are under constant video surveillance. To survive in the villa, the Islanders must be in a relationship with another Islander. The Islanders couple up for the first time on first impressions but they are later forced to "re-couple" at special ceremonies in which they can choose to remain with their current partners or to switch partners. At the villa, the couples must share a bed for sleeping and are permitted to talk with other Islanders at any time, allowing them to get to know everyone.

The Islanders are presented with many games and challenges that are designed to test their physical and mental abilities, after which the winners are sometimes presented with special prizes, such as a night at the Hideaway or a special date.

Islanders can be eliminated, or "dumped", for several reasons; these include remaining single after a re-coupling and by public vote through the Love Island mobile app. During the show's final week, members of the public vote to decide which couple should win the series; the couple who receive the most votes win.

At the envelope ceremony on finale night, the couple who received the highest number of votes from the public receive two envelopes, one for each partner. One envelope contains €50,000 and the other contains nothing. The partner with the envelope may choose whether to share the money with his or her partner as a test of trust and commitment.

== Islanders ==
On 28 August 2023, it was announced on social media, that on the first day 10 single Islanders will enter the villa. The original Islanders for the tenth series were announced on 24 September 2023, one week before the series launch.

| Islander | Age | Hometown | Occupation | Entered | Exit | Status | Ref |
|---|---|---|---|---|---|---|---|
| Adrian Butușină | 29 | Tulcea, Tulcea | Personal trainer | Day 1 | | Winner | |
| Anne-Marie Dan | 23 | Giurgiu, Giurgiu | Law student | Day 4 | | Winner | |
| Călin Bocănici | 29 | Cluj-Napoca, Cluj | Dermopigmentist | Day 4 | | Runner-up | |
| Denisa Pop | 25 | Cluj-Napoca, Cluj | Model | Day 28 | | Runner-up | |
| Alexia Filip | 20 | Bolintin-Vale, Giurgiu | Model | Day 26 | | Third place | |
| Denis Iuga | 21 | Bistrița, Bistrița-Năsăud | Video creator | Day 1 | | Third place | |
| Luis Giurcă | 24 | Cernavodă, Constanța | Nuclear engineer | Day 17 | | Dumped | |
| Nargi Gaidarovna | 23 | Chișinău, Moldova | Business owner | Day 1 | | Dumped | |
| Diana Simota | 22 | Iași, Iași | Model | Day 10 | | Dumped | |
| Răzvan Popa | 24 | Râmnicu Vâlcea, Vâlcea | Brazilian jiu-jitsu instructor | Day 26 | | Dumped | |
| Andrei Bordeianu | 26 | Bucharest | Civil engineer | Day 1 | | Dumped | |
| Alexandra Ebru | 26 | Ploiești, Prahova | Make-up artist | Day | | Dumped | |
| Ada Ileana | 26 | Bucharest | English teacher | Day 1 | | Dumped | |
| Kiprianos Cimuca | 22 | Tripolitza, Greece / Cluj-Napoca, Cluj | Fitness model | Day 12 | Day 30 | Dumped | |
| Josefinka Szmolena | 21 | Oradea, Bihor | Flight attendant | Day 1 | Day 28 | Dumped | |
| Alexandra Balea | 23 | Cluj-Napoca, Cluj | Medical student | Day 1 | Day 25 | Walked | |
| Vlad | 20 | Bucharest | Influencer | Day 16 | Day 24 | Dumped | |
| Cerasela | 25 | Călărași, Călărași | Make-up artist | Day 7 | Day 21 | Dumped | |
| Eduard Caba | 24 | Brașov, Brașov | Legal assistant | Day 1 | Day 21 | Dumped | |
| Mădălina Rancea | 26 | Bârlad, Vaslui | Sales consultant | Day 1 | Day 14 | Dumped | |
| Roxana Dancof | 24 | Craiova, Dolj | Hostess | Day 7 | Day 7 | Dumped | |
| Valentin Popescu | 27 | Bucharest | Content creator | Day 1 | Day 6 | Walked | |
| Gabriela Ilișiu | 23 | Cluj-Napoca, Cluj | Singer | Day 1 | Day 5 | Dumped | |

== Production ==
=== Development and filming ===
In spring 2023, it was announced by ITV Studios that a Romanian version of Love Island was in pre-production. The series was officially announced by Pro TV on May 12, 2023, with the applications being open immediately for all singles men and women, all around Romania. The first teaser trailer, featuring islanders from British version of the show in a 30s airline themed promo, was released also on 12 May. With the second teaser trailer released on 29 June, the prize of €50.000 was revealed. On 5 August 2023, Pro TV released the third trailer for the series, a thirty-second teaser featuring a group of young people running on the beach to get a place in the villa, as narrator exclaims "In the game of love, only the fittest succeed".

On 21 August 2023, it was announced that Alina Ceușan would be hosting the show. Following the announcement, Ceușan said on her Instagram account: "We've kept this secret from you for a while, but now it's time: I'm thrilled to let you know I'll be your host on Love Island Romania this fall. The very first season of the original show that wowed the world will be a challenge for all of us and I'm proud to be part of this huge project that celebrates couples and the love that brings them together. Embark on this journey with us this fall on Voyo and Pro TV. I'll see you there."

=== Casting ===
Auditions for the first season of the show were officially announced on May 12, 2023, with the show looking to make use of their social media accounts to start their audition drive for the new season. To do this, they made use of promotional ads using footage taken from the show's intro theme, as well as using persuasive captions surrounding the ideals of finding love. The producers as usual were looking for young and attractive single boys and girls between the ages 18 and 35, looking to get potential applicants to fill out an extensive application form through the use of their website. This application form would detail general personal details, such as name, gender and age, as well as asking potential islanders questions surrounding their suitability for the show. According to Pro TV, in the first days of casting, thousands single people interested in the official application link of Love Island România.

=== Villa ===
Villa location in Tenerife

The islanders live together in the villa, where 24 hours a day their every word and every action is recorded by cameras and microphones in all the rooms in the villa. The location for the series was not initially confirmed, but it was teased as "an exotic location". On 21 August, following the announcement of the host, Alina Ceușan, announced on her Facebook page that the villa vill be in Tenerife.

On 23 August 2023, on official website, it were published some photos from inside the villa. The villa has a variety of luxury features, such as a large outside pool and kitchen area, day-beds, the iconic beach-hut, lounge and bedrooms.

=== Broadcast ===
The series is scheduled to premiere on October 1, 2023, on Voyo and the day before on Pro TV and will air from Sunday to Friday at 11:30 p.m.

== Coupling and elimination history ==
| Week & Day → Islander ↓ | Week 1 | | | Week 2 | | | Week 3 | | | Week 4 | | | Week 5 | | | Week 6 | | | |
| Week & Day → Islander ↓ | Day 1 | Day 2 | Day 5 | Day 7 | Day 12 | Day 14 | Day 17 | | Day 21 | Day 24 | Day 26 | Day 28 | Day 30 | Day 35 | Day 38 | Day | | Day | |
|---|---|---|---|---|---|---|---|---|---|---|---|---|---|---|---|---|---|---|---|
| Adrian | Josefinka | | Anne-Marie | Diana to save | Anne-Marie | N/A | Anne-Marie | | Safe | Anne-Marie | | N/A | Anne-Marie | | Safe | Anne-Marie | Răzvan & Diana to dump | Safe | Winner (Day ) |
| Anne-Marie | Not in Villa | | Adrian | N/A | Adrian | Vulnerable | Adrian | | Safe | Adrian | | Vulnerable | Adrian | | Safe | Adrian | Răzvan & Diana to dump | Safe | Winner (Day ) |
| Călin | Not in Villa | | Nargi | Diana to save | Single | N/A | Diana | | Vulnerable | Josefinka | | N/A | Alexia | | Safe | Denisa | Adrian & Anne-Maria to dump | Safe | Runner-up (Day ) |
| Denisa | Not in Villa | | | | | | | | | | | Immune | Denis | | Safe | Călin | Răzvan & Diana to dump | Safe | Runner-up (Day ) |
| Alexia | Not in Villa | | | | | | | | | | Denis | Vulnerable | Călin | | Safe | Denis | Răzvan & Diana to dump | Safe | Third place (Day ) |
| Denis | Ada | Nargi | Mădălina | Diana to save | Mădălina | N/A | Alexandra B. | | Safe | Alexandra B. | Alexia | N/A | Denisa | | Safe | Alexia | Răzvan & Diana to dump | Safe | Third place (Day ) |
| Nargi | Single | Denis | Călin | N/A | Kiprianos | Vulnerable | Kiprianos | | Vulnerable | Kiprianos | Răzvan | Vulnerable | Răzvan | | Safe | Luis | Călin & Denisa to dump | Eliminated | Dumped (Day ) |
| Luis | Not in Villa | | | | | | | | Immune | Diana | | N/A | Diana | | Safe | Nargi | Răzvan & Diana to dump | Eliminated | Dumped (Day ) |
| Diana | Not in Villa | | | Vulnerable | Single | Vulnerable | Călin | | Vulnerable | Luis | | Vulnerable | Luis | | Safe | Răzvan | Călin & Denisa to dump | Dumped (Day ) | |
| Răzvan | Not in Villa | | | | | | | | | | Nargi | N/A | Nargi | | Safe | Diana | Luis & Nargi to dump | Dumped (Day ) | |
| Alexandra E. | Not in Villa | | | | | | | | | | | | | Andrei | Eliminated | Dumped (Day 38) | | | |
| Andrei | Gabriela | | Ada | Diana to save | Ada | Mădălina to dump | Ada | | Safe | Ada | | N/A | Ada | Alexandra E. | Eliminated | Dumped (Day 38) | | | |
| Ada | Denis | Single | Andrei | N/A | Andrei | Vulnerable | Andrei | | Safe | Andrei | | Vulnerable | Andrei | Single | Dumped (Day 35) | | | | |
| Kiprianos | Not in Villa | | | | Nargi | N/A | Nargi | | Vulnerable | Nargi | Single | N/A | Single | Dumped (Day 30) | | | | | |
| Josefinka | Adrian | | Eduard | N/A | Eduard | Vulnerable | Single | Vlad | Safe | Călin | | Vulnerable | Dumped (Day 28) | | | | | | |
| Alexandra B. | Valentin | | Valentin | N/A | Single | Vulnerable | Denis | | Safe | Denis | Walked (Day 25) | | | | | | | | |
| Vlad | Not in Villa | | | | | | | Josefinka | Safe | Single | Dumped (Day 24) | | | | | | | | |
| Cerasela | Not in Villa | | | Vulnerable | Single | Vulnerable | Eduard | | Vulnerable | Dumped (Day 21) | | | | | | | | | |
| Eduard | Mădălina | | Josefinka | Diana to save | Josefinka | N/A | Cerasela | | Vulnerable | Dumped (Day 21) | | | | | | | | | |
| Mădălina | Eduard | | Denis | N/A | Denis | Vulnerable | Dumped (Day 14) | | | | | | | | | | | | |
| Roxana | Not in Villa | | | Vulnerable | Dumped (Day 7) | | | | | | | | | | | | | | |
| Valentin | Alexandra B. | | Alexandra B. | Walked (Day 6) | | | | | | | | | | | | | | | |
| Gabriela | Andrei | | Single | Dumped (Day 5) | | | | | | | | | | | | | | | |
| Notes | 1 | | 2 | 3 | 4 | 5 | 6 | | 7 | None | 8 | | | | | | | | |
| Walked | None | | | Valentin | None | | | | | Alexandra B. | None | | | | | | | | |
| Dumped | No; Dumping | | Gabriela; Failed to couple up | Roxana; Boy's choice to dump | No; Dumping | Mădălina; Andrei's choice to dump | No; Dumping | | Eduard; Girl's choice to dump | Vlad; Failed to couple up | No; Dumping | Josefinka; Boy's choice to dump | Kiprianos; Failed to couple up | Ada; Andrei's choice to dump | Andrei & Alexandra E. Romania's choice to dump | Răzvan & Diana; 6 of 10 votes to dump | | Luis & Nargi; Romania's choice to dump | Denis & Alexia; Third–most votes to win |
| Dumped | No; Dumping | | Gabriela; Failed to couple up | Roxana; Boy's choice to dump | No; Dumping | Mădălina; Andrei's choice to dump | No; Dumping | | Cerasela; Boy's choice to dump | Vlad; Failed to couple up | No; Dumping | Josefinka; Boy's choice to dump | Kiprianos; Failed to couple up | Ada; Andrei's choice to dump | Andrei & Alexandra E. Romania's choice to dump | Răzvan & Diana; 6 of 10 votes to dump | | Luis & Nargi; Romania's choice to dump | Călin & Denisa; Second–most votes to win |
| Dumped | No; Dumping | | Gabriela; Failed to couple up | Roxana; Boy's choice to dump | No; Dumping | Mădălina; Andrei's choice to dump | No; Dumping | | Cerasela; Boy's choice to dump | Vlad; Failed to couple up | No; Dumping | Josefinka; Boy's choice to dump | Kiprianos; Failed to couple up | Ada; Andrei's choice to dump | Andrei & Alexandra E. Romania's choice to dump | Răzvan & Diana; 6 of 10 votes to dump | | Luis & Nargi; Romania's choice to dump | Adrian & Anne-Marie; Most votes to win |

=== Notes ===
- ^Note 1 : Nargi entered after the first coupling and was told that after twenty-four hours she would be allowed to steal a boy from another girl. On Day 2, Nargi chose to couple up with Denis, leaving Ada single. All other Day 1 couples remained the same.
- ^Note 2 : Romania voted for their favorite girl to save from dumping. The girl who received the most votes were granted safety. Romania saved Ada.
- ^Note 3 : Romania voted for their favorite new girl to save from dumping. Romania saved Cerasela, leaving Diana and Roxana vulnerable to being dumped. Then, the guys had to collectively choose to save either Diana or Roxana. Diana was saved, meaning that Roxana was dumped from Love Island.
- ^Note 4 : Kiprianos entered after the initial re-coupling and was told that after twenty-four hours he would be allowed to steal a girl from another guy. Later, Kiprianos chose to couple up with Nargi, leaving Călin single. All other Day 5 couples remained the same.
- ^Note 5 : Romania voted for their favorite boys. The favourite boy who received the most votes was granted safety and then had to decide which girl to dump. Andrei received the most votes and then he choose Mădălina to dump.
- ^Note 6 : Josefinka failed to couple up at the re-coupling ceremony. Later, a new bombshell, Vlad arrived, but was told he would be able to save Josefinka or enter in the villa single. He choose to save her and they were automatically coupled up.
- ^Note 7 : Romania voted for their favorite couple, with the four couples with the most votes being safe. Since Luis was single, he was granted immunity from the vote. The four saved girls then had to decide which vulnerable man to dump, choosing Eduard, and the four saved boys had to decide which vulnerable woman to dump, choosing Cerasela.
- ^Note 8 : Alexia and Răzvan entered after the initial re-coupling and were told that after twenty-four hours they would be allowed to steal a girl/boy from another girl/guy. Later, Alexia chose to couple up with Denis and Răzvan chose to couple up with Nargi leaving Kiprianos single. All other couples remained the same.
