= Love Island România =

- Genre: Reality
- Created by: ITV Studios
- Based on: Love Island by Richard Cowles
- Presented by: Alina Ceușan
- Narrated by: Dragoș Răduță
- Country of origin: Romania
- Original language: Romanian
- No. of seasons: 1

Production
- Executive producer: Antonii Mangov
- Production location: Tenerife
- Camera setup: Multiple-camera setup
- Running time: 100-110 minutes
- Production companies: ITV Studios; Atresmedia

Original release
- Network: Pro TV; Voyo
- Release: 1 October – 10 November 2023

Related
- Love Island franchise

Love Island România is a Romanian dating reality show based on the international Love Island franchise. The show is presented by Alina Ceușan while Dragoș Răduță provided voice-over narration.

Following the premise of other versions of the Love Island format, the show features a group of single contestants, known as "islanders" who live together in a specially constructed villa that is isolated from the outside world, in an attempt to find love. The islanders are continuously monitored during their stay in the house by live television cameras as well as personal audio microphones. Throughout the series, the contestants "couple up" to avoid being dumped from the villa. Additionally, Romania will vote for their favourite islanders to stay in the villa at points in the series. As old islanders are dumped, new islanders will enter the villa. At the end of the season, Romania will vote one final time to determine the winning couple.

== Format ==
Love Island involves a group of contestants, referred to as Islanders, living in isolation from the outside world in a villa, constantly under video surveillance. To survive in the villa the Islanders must be coupled up with another Islander, whether it be for love, friendship or survival, as the overall winning couple receives €50,000. On the first day, the Islanders couple up for the first time based on first impressions, but over the duration of the series, they are forced to "re-couple" where they can choose (or be chosen) to remain in their current couple or swap and change.

Any Islander who remains single, after the coupling, is eliminated and "dumped" from the island. Islanders can also be eliminated via a public vote during the series. The public can vote for their favorite couple or who they think is the most compatible through the Love Island app available on smartphones. Couples who receive the fewest votes risk being eliminated. Occasionally, twists may occur where the islanders must eliminate each other. During the final week, the public vote for which couple they want to win the series and take home the prize.

Whilst in the villa, each Islander has their own phone with which they can only contact other Islanders via text – or receive texts informing them of the latest challenges, dumping, or re-coupling. Islanders and couples must typically take part in many games and challenges designed to test their physical and mental abilities, with the winners receiving special prizes afterward. Some Islanders are also sent on dates outside the villa or can win dates by winning challenges.

== Production ==
=== Development ===
On spring 2023, it was announced by ITV Studios that a Romanian version of Love Island was in pre-production. The format was also acquired by Antena 1 in February 2020, but it was no longer produced.

The series was officially announced by Pro TV on 12 May 2023, with the applications being open immediately for all singles men and women, all around Romania. The first teaser trailer, featuring islanders from British version of the show in a 30s airline themed promo, was released also on 12 May 2023. Following the announcement of the series, Antonii Mangov, the Programming Director Pro TV said: "We are very excited to finally bring Love Island to Romania. The show is one of the hottest formats in the world at the moment, and it fits perfectly with VOYO and Pro TV's strategy of having quality entertainment for diverse audiences. Love Island already has very many fans in Romania, who have seen the international version of the show and I am sure they will appreciate the Romanian version that will be produced under the quality signature of Pro TV."

=== Broadcast ===
The first season of Love Island România is set to begin on October 1, 2023 on Voyo and the day before on Pro TV.

== Series overview ==
Series	Islanders	Days	Location	Episodes	Originally released		Winners	Runners-up	Average viewers (millions)
Series	Islanders	Days	Location	Episodes	First released	Last released	Winners	Runners-up	Average viewers (millions)
1	23	44	Tenerife	36	1 & 2 October 2023	10 November 2023	Adrian Butușină & Anne-Marie Dan	Călin Bocănici & Denisa	TBA
