= Damian Jackson =

Damian Jackson may refer to:

- Damian Jackson (baseball) (born 1973), American baseball player
- Damian Jackson (gridiron football) (born 1992), American gridiron football player
