= Cocktail Master =

- The title card for the series
- Genre: Reality competition
- Judges: Tijana Klajn; Filip Lipnik; Mario Majcen
- Country of origin: Croatia
- Original language: Croatian
- No. of seasons: 1
- No. of episodes: 11

Production
- Executive producer: Sabina Krešić
- Producer: Danilo Caković
- Running time: 40 minutes
- Production companies: Vid Film; RTL

Original release
- Network: Voyo
- Release: 24 March – 20 April 2025

Cocktail Master is a Croatian reality competition streaming television series that premiered on 24 March 2025 on Voyo. The series follows bartenders who vie to earn a cash prize for preparing the best cocktails.

== Production ==
RTL announced the series on 17 March 2025. On the same day, a premiere date of 24 March 2024 was confirmed. The series released on RTL's streaming service Voyo in Croatia and Serbia, as well as on the Slovene iteration of the platform. The series is set to consist of eleven 40-minute episodes, with the final episode scheduled to release on 19 April 2025.

The competition took place in five cities: Zagreb, Ljubljana, Belgrade, Skopje and Sarajevo. The grand finale took place in Zagreb.

=== Format ===
A total of 100 bartenders enter the competition in order to win a cash prize of 30,000€. The contestant are challenged to prepare cocktails, which are judged by three professional bartenders – Tijana Klajn, Filip Lipnik, and Mario Majcen.

In the first round of the competition, the jury selects top five contestants in each of the five competing countries. Among the top five, three contestants are declared automatic qualifiers, whereas the remaining two contestants enter an elimination round where they are prompted to prepare another cocktail; the contestant with the better drink advances in the competition. After a top four is selected from each country, a total of twenty contestants participate in the grand final in Zagreb.

== Contestants ==
The following is a list of contestants that qualified into the Top 5 from their respective country.

Contestants of Cocktail Master and their backgrounds
Top 5 qualifiers from	Contestant	Age	Residence	Outcome
North Macedonia	David Davidovikj	30	Skopje	Winner (ep. 11)
Croatia	Tomislav Stančić	35	Šibenik	Runner-up (ep. 11)
North Macedonia	Vanja Golovski	29	Skopje	Eliminated at Top 3 (ep. 11)
Slovenia	Benjamin Škafer	32	Ljubljana	Eliminated at Top 4 (ep. 11)
Montenegro	Krsto Vukanić	31	Podgorica	Eliminated at Top 5 (ep. 10)
Serbia	Boban Lazarević	52	Kragujevac	Eliminated at Top 6 (ep. 9)
Bosnia and Herzegovina	Dalibor Kapetanovic	36	Sarajevo	TBA
Bosnia and Herzegovina	Josip Ružić	29	Vitez	TBA
Croatia	Leon Švec	18	Zagreb	TBA
Slovenia	Lovro	25	Zreče	TBA (Note: The contestant was originally eliminated at the local Qualification Rounds, but returned to the competition due to another contestant withdrawing.)
Eliminated at Top 20
Slovenia	Aleksandar	21	Koper	Eliminated at Top 20 (ep. 6)
North Macedonia	Darko Jovancevski	31	Skopje	Eliminated at Top 20 (ep. 6)
Croatia	Hrvoje Rihtaric	31	Zagreb	Eliminated at Top 20 (ep. 6)
Bosnia and Herzegovina	Ivan Brkić	33	Ljubuški	Eliminated at Top 20 (ep. 6)
North Macedonia	Ljupčo Jakovleski	33	Skopje	Eliminated at Top 20 (ep. 6)
Serbia	Nikola	31	Belgrade	Eliminated at Top 20 (ep. 6)
Croatia	Svjetlana	47	Strmec Samoborski	Eliminated at Top 20 (ep. 6)
Serbia	Todor	22	Kragujevac	Eliminated at Top 20 (ep. 6)
Slovenia	Žan	26	Ljubljana	Eliminated at Top 20 (ep. 6)
Bosnia and Herzegovina	Žarko Zekić	34	Sarajevo	Eliminated at Top 20 (ep. 6)
Slovenia	Gal	26	Ljubljana	Withdrew at Top 20 (ep. 6)
Eliminated at the local Qualification Rounds
North Macedonia	Vančo Stojanov	41	Skopje	Eliminated at the Qualifications (ep. 5)
Montenegro	Rajko	40	Podgorica	Eliminated at the Qualifications(ep. 4)
Bosnia and Herzegovina	Edis Duvnjak	39	Sarajevo	Eliminated at the Qualifications (ep. 2)
Croatia	Andrija Kulušić	29	Split	Eliminated at the Qualifications (ep. 1)

== Episodes ==
No.	Title	Original release date
1	"Episode 1"	24 March 2025
A group of contestants form Croatia enter the competition in Zagreb. They were prompted to prepare a cocktail with a maximum of five ingredients. After tasting all of the cocktails, the judges selected a Top 5. Among the top 5, Hrvoje, Leon and Tomislav were declared automatic qualifiers, whereas Svjetlana and Andrija had to take a part in an elimination round, where they had to prepare an additional cocktail.: Top 5: Andrija, Hrvoje, Leon, Svjetlana and Tomislav; Elimination round: Andrija and Svjetlana; Eliminated: Andrija
2	"Episode 2"	25 March 2025
The second episode takes place in Sarajevo. Josip, Ivan and Žarko were selected as the automatic qualifiers, whereas Edis and Dalibor entered the elimination round. In the elimination round, the contestants had to implement rakia in their cocktails.: Top 5: Edis, Dalibor, Josip, Ivan and Žarko; Elimination round: Edis and Dalibor; Eliminated: Edis
3	"Episode 3"	26 March 2025
The third episode took place in Ljubljana. The jury selected Benjamin, Aleksandar and Žan as the automatic qualifiers, whereas Lovro and Gal entered the elimination round, at which the secret ingredient was the egg. Lovro was eliminated.: Top 5: Aleksandar, Benjamin, Žan, Lovro, Gal; Elimination round: Gal and Lovro; Eliminated: Lovro
4	"Episode 4"	27 March 2025
The fourth episode took place in Belgrade, with contestants from Serbia and Montenegro participating. Boban, Kristo, Todor, Nikola and Rajko were selected as the Top 5, with Nikola and Rajko entering the elimination round. They had to prepare an additional coktali, using raspberries, which were introduced as the secret ingredient. After th elimination round, the jury voted Rajko out.: Top 5: Boban, Krsto, Todor, Nikola, Rajko; Elimination round: Nikola and Rajko; Eliminated: Rajko
5	"Episode 5"	28 March 2025
The fifth and the final episode of qualification rounds took place in Skopje. At the elimination round, the secret ingredients were the grapes.: Top 5: Ljupči, Darko, Vančo, David, Vanja; Elimination round: Darko and Vančo; Eliminated: Vančo
6	"Episode 6"	4 April 2025
The Top 20 contestants, four from the each of five countries, entered the final of the competition that takes place in Zagreb. The judges announced that Gal from Slovenia has withdrawn from the competition and has been replaced with Lovro, who originally made it to Top 5 in Slovenia, but was eliminated at the elimination round. All 20 contestants prepare one cocktail. The judges announced that only 10 out of 20 will advance in the competition.: Eliminated: Aleksandar, Nikola, Ivan, Žarko, Darko, Todor, Hrvoje, Svjetlana, Ljupči, Žan
7	"Episode 7"	5 April 2025
8	"Episode 8"	11 April 2025
9	"Episode 9"	12 April 2025
10	"Episode 10"	18 April 2025
11	"Episode 11"	19 April 2025
