= Gumy =

- Genre: Comedy
- Written by: Michal Samir
- Directed by: Karin Krajčo Babinská
- Starring: Richard Krajčo; David Švehlík
- Country of origin: Czech Republic
- Original language: Czech
- No. of seasons: 1
- No. of episodes: 10

Production
- Running time: 30 minutes

Original release
- Network: Voyo
- Release: October 28 – November 25, 2022

Gumy is a comedy television series created for Voyo. The series was directed by Karin Krajčo Babinská, the screenplay was written by Michal Samir.

Richard Krajčo, David Švehlík, Patricie Pagáčová, Dana Batulková, Pavel Šimčík, Robert Nebřenský, Sandra Pogodová and others appeared in main roles.

The series premiered on Voyo on October 28, 2022 and ended on November 25, 2022, with a total of 10 episodes over the course of 1 season.

== Plot ==
The plot of the series revolves around a pair of quirky car mechanics, Mára and Lukyn, who have been inseparable friends since childhood. Mára is rough, direct, but stubborn while Lukyn is kind, smart, and a bit of a child. They both own a car workshop, but would like to expand their business. They lack funds for that, which they try to get through absurd and ill-conceived plans that often land them in even more absurd situations. They live on the outskirts of a big city, among other characters from the community "beyond the wall". In the former factory area, where, in addition to their car workshop, there is also a pub, newsagent, boutique or even a pet store.

== Cast ==
- Richard Krajčo as Mára
- David Švehlík as Lukyn
- Patricie Pagáčová as Maruška
- Dana Batulková as Dagmar
- Pavel Šimčík as Dušan
- Robert Nebřenský as Láďa
- Andrej Polák as Pepík
- Roman Mrázik as Béďa

== Episodes ==
No.	Title	Directed by	Written by	Original release date
1	"Pohřeb"	Karin Krajčo Babinská	Michal Samir	October 28, 2022
2	"Koupaliště"	Karin Krajčo Babinská	Michal Samir	October 28, 2022
3	"Trafika"	Karin Krajčo Babinská	Michal Samir	November 4, 2022
4	"Zásilka"	Karin Krajčo Babinská	Michal Samir	November 4, 2022
5	"Kasino"	Karin Krajčo Babinská	Michal Samir	November 11, 2022
6	"Svatba"	Karin Krajčo Babinská	Michal Samir	November 11, 2022
7	"Pojistka"	Karin Krajčo Babinská	Michal Samir	November 18, 2022
8	"Erotická linka"	Karin Krajčo Babinská	Michal Samir	November 18, 2022
9	"Mašina"	Karin Krajčo Babinská	Michal Samir	November 25, 2022
10	"Kalif"	Karin Krajčo Babinská	Michal Samir	November 25, 2022
