= Případ Stodolovi =

- Genre: Crime, documentary
- Written by: Mirek Vaňura; Dana Vaňurová
- Directed by: Mirek Vaňura; Dana Vaňurová
- Starring: Mirek Vaňura
- Music by: Miroslav Vobořil
- Country of origin: Czech Republic
- Original language: Czech
- No. of seasons: 1
- No. of episodes: 5

Production
- Running time: 40 minutes

Original release
- Network: Voyo
- Release: 15 March 2024

Případ Stodolovi (Stodola Case) is a 2024 Czech documentary series about serial killers Jaroslav and Dana Stodolovi who were responsible for 8 murders, 2 attempted murders and 2 robberies. The series was a project by Mirek Vaňura.

The series provides reconstruction of police work and the detailed view on case of murders committed by Stodolas. The series shows never-before-seen police footage, behind-the-scenes photos of the investigation and all-new testimonies. Vaňura worked on the project with his wife Dana.

== Episodes ==
| No. | Title | Directed by | Written by | Original release date |
|---|---|---|---|---|
| 1 | "První nález těl" | Mirek Vaňura; Dana Vaňurová | Mirek Vaňura; Dana Vaňurová | 15 March 2024 |
| 2 | "Identikit" | Mirek Vaňura; Dana Vaňurová | Mirek Vaňura; Dana Vaňurová | 15 March 2024 |
| 3 | "Pochybení" | Mirek Vaňura; Dana Vaňurová | Mirek Vaňura; Dana Vaňurová | 15 March 2024 |
| 4 | "Stodolová vs. Stodola" | Mirek Vaňura; Dana Vaňurová | Mirek Vaňura; Dana Vaňurová | 15 March 2024 |
| 5 | "Spravedlnost" | Mirek Vaňura; Dana Vaňurová | Mirek Vaňura; Dana Vaňurová | 15 March 2024 |
