= Love Island South Africa =

South African dating reality series

- Genre: Reality
- Created by: ITV Studios
- Based on: Love Island by Richard Cowles
- Presented by: Leandie du Randt
- Country of origin: South Africa
- Original language: English
- No. of seasons: 1

Production
- Executive producer: Maarten Meijs (ITV Studios)
- Production locations: Cape Town, South Africa
- Running time: 60 minutes
- Production companies: ITV Studios; Rapid Blue

Original release
- Network: M-Net
- Release: 28 February 2021 – present

Love Island South Africa is a South African dating reality show based on the international Love Island franchise.

Following the premise of other versions of the Love Island format, the show features a group of single contestants, known as "islanders" who live together in a specially constructed villa that is isolated from the outside world, in an attempt to find love. The islanders are continuously monitored during their stay in the house by live television cameras as well as personal audio microphones. Throughout the series, the contestants "couple up" to avoid being dumped from the villa. Additionally, South Africa will vote for their favourite islanders to stay in the villa at points in the series. As old islanders are dumped, new islanders will enter the villa. At the end of the season, South Africa will vote one final time to determine the winning couple.

== Format ==
Love Island involves a group of contestants, referred to as Islanders, living in isolation from the outside world in a villa in Cape Town, constantly under video surveillance. To survive in the villa the Islanders must be coupled up with another Islander, whether it be for love, friendship or survival, as the overall winning couple receives R500,000. On the first day, the Islanders couple up for the first time based on first impressions, but over the duration of the series, they are forced to "re-couple" where they can choose (or be chosen) to remain in their current couple or swap and change.

Any Islander who remains single, after the coupling, is eliminated and "dumped" from the island. Islanders can also be eliminated via a public vote during the series. The public can vote for their favorite couple or who they think is the most compatible through the Love Island app available on smartphones. Couples who receive the fewest votes risk being eliminated. Occasionally, twists may occur where the islanders must eliminate each other. During the final week, the public vote for which couple they want to win the series and take home the prize.

Whilst in the villa, each Islander has their own phone with which they can only contact other Islanders via text – or receive texts informing them of the latest challenges, dumping, or re-coupling. Islanders and couples must typically take part in many games and challenges designed to test their physical and mental abilities, with the winners receiving special prizes afterward. Some Islanders are also sent on dates outside the villa or can win dates by winning challenges.

== Production ==
=== Development ===
On 6 November 2020, South African TV Network M-Net ordered the show to be produced in a villa in Cape Town. The series made its debut on 28 February 2021.

On 29 January 2021, Leandie du Randt was announced as the host for the series.

== Episodes ==
Series	Days	Islanders	Winner	Runner-up	Prize Money	Location	Episodes	Originally released	
Series	Days	Islanders	Winner	Runner-up	Prize Money	Location	Episodes	First released	Last released
1	32	26	Libho Geza & Thimna Shooto	Asad Boomgaard & Millie Terblanche	R1,000,000	Cape Town	36	28 February 2021	11 April 2021

== Reception ==
=== Criticism ===
==== Lack of diversity ====
After the cast was announced the show received criticism and backlash over the initial cast and the fact that it was "too white" and complained that not enough black people were cast as part of the initial cast. The production team promised more diversity later on in the show.

==== Poor production quality ====
Further criticism emerged after the premiere of the show due to its poor production quality and editing. The network later apologised and promised to fix the issues with the production and editing quality.
