= Love Island (Greek TV series) =

- Genre: Reality
- Based on: Love Island by Richard Cowles
- Presented by: Iliana Papageorgiou
- Narrated by: Vangelis Giannopoulos
- Country of origin: Greece
- Original language: Greek
- No. of series: 1
- No. of episodes: 28

Production
- Executive producer: Anna Arvaniti
- Producer: Nikos Kalis
- Production location: Tenerife
- Running time: 105 minutes (incl. adverts)
- Production companies: ITV Studios; Silverline Media Productions

Original release
- Network: Skai TV
- Release: 29 September – 5 November 2022

Related
- Love Island franchise Celebrity Love Island; Love Island

Love Island is a Greek dating reality show based on the British series Love Island. Following the premise of other versions of the Love Island format, the show features a group of single contestants, known as "islanders" who live together in a luxury villa that is isolated from the outside world, in an attempt to find love. Throughout the series, the contestants "couple up" to avoid being dumped from the villa. As old islanders are dumped, new islanders will enter the villa. At the end, Greece will vote one final time to determine the winning couple. It premiered on 29 September 2022, on Skai TV. The show was hosted by Iliana Papageorgiou and narrated by Vangelis Giannopoulos.

The final aired on 5 November 2022, with Argiris Fragkos and Maria Astoglou winning and sharing the €50,000 prize money. Anastasia Sidiropoulou and Giorgos Georgiou finished as runners up.

== History ==
In April 2022, Skai TV announced that will air the show on 2022-2023 television season. On 8 August 2022, it was announced that Iliana Papageorgiou will be the host of the show. The first season was filmed in Tenerife. The launch show was originally scheduled to be broadcast on 27 September, but was postponed out due to extreme weather conditions in Tenerife.

== Islanders ==
The Islanders for the first series were released on 23 September 2022, just one week before the launch.

Islander	Age	Hometown	Entered	Status
Argiris Fragkos	22	Samos	Day 6	Winner (Day 39)
Maria Astoglou	22	Thessaloniki	Day 1	Winner (Day 39)
Anastasia Sidiropoulou	23	Athens	Day 1	Runner-up (Day 39)
Giorgos Georgiou	21	Athens	Day 1	Runner-up (Day 39)
Fanis Papadopoulos	31	Rhodes	Day 22	Third place (Day 39)
Niki Iliopoulou	33	Athens	Day 1	Dumped (Day 17)
Niki Iliopoulou	33	Athens	Day 27	Third place (Day 39)
Alexandros Kotsis	34	Athens	Day 1	Fourth place (Day 39)
Christina Mitsakou	29	Athens	Day 1	Fourth place (Day 39)
Alexandros Lushaj	25	Athens	Day 1	Dumped (Day 36)
Claudia Penca	24	Dubai	Day 1	Dumped (Day 36)
Katerina Vagancia	25	Athens	Day 17	Dumped (Day 35)
Panagiotis Avramopoulos	30	Athens	Day 10	Dumped (Day 35)
Christos Souzos	28	Corfu	Day 21	Dumped (Day 28)
George Sotiriou	24	Athens	Day 13	Dumped (Day 20)
Julia Karagianni	26	Athens	Day 15	Dumped (Day 20)
Vasilis Dafos	24	Piraeus	Day 1	Dumped (Day 16)
George Korkas	29	Corinth	Day 1	Walked (Day 14)
Ionna Tzani	27	Gytheio	Day 3	Walked (Day 14)
Thodoris Kontoleon	21	Athens	Day 1	Dumped (Day 9)

== Coupling ==
The couples were chosen shortly after the islanders enter the villa.

	Day 1	Day 9	Day 16	Day 24	Day 29	Day 31	Final
Argiris	Not in Villa	Maria	Maria	Maria	Anastasia	Maria	Winner (Day 39)
Maria	Thodoris	Argiris	Argiris	Argiris	Alexandros L.	Argiris	Winner (Day 39)
Anastasia	George K.	Vasilis	Giorgos	Giorgos	Argiris	Giorgos	Runner-up (Day 39)
Giorgos	Christina	Ioanna	Anastasia	Anastasia	Claudia	Anastasia	Runner-up (Day 39)
Fanis	Not in Villa			Katerina	Christina	Niki	Third place (Day 39)
Niki	Alexandros L.	Alexandros L.	George S.	Dumped; Day 17	Panagiotis	Fanis	Third place (Day 39)
Alexandros K.	—N/a	Christina	Christina	Christina	Katerina	Christina	Fourth place (Day 39)
Christina	Giorgos	Alexandros K.	Alexandros K.	Alexandros K.	Fanis	Alexandros K.	Fourth place (Day 39)
Alexandros L.	Niki	Niki	Claudia	Claudia	Maria	Claudia	Dumped (Day 36)
Claudia	Vasilis	George K.	Alexandros L.	Alexandros L.	Giorgos	Alexandros L.	Dumped (Day 36)
Katerina	Not in Villa			Fanis	Alexandros K.	Panagiotis	Dumped (Day 35)
Panagiotis	Not in Villa		Julia	—N/a	Niki	Katerina	Dumped (Day 35)
Christos	Not in Villa			—N/a	Dumped (Day 28)		
George S.	Not in Villa		Nikki	Dumped (Day 20)			
Julia	Not in Villa		Panagiotis	Dumped (Day 20)			
Vasilis	Claudia	Anastasia	Dumped (Day 16)				
George K.	Anastasia	Claudia	Walked (Day 14)				
Ioanna	Not in Villa	Giorgos	Walked (Day 14)				
Thodoris	Maria	Dumped (Day 9)					
Notes	1	none			2	none	

=== Notes ===
- ^Note 1: Alexandros K. arrived after the coupling on Day 1, but was told he would be able to steal a girl for himself on Day 2. He picked Christina, leaving Giorgos single.
- ^Note 2: After the initial recoupling, host Iliana revealed that there would be a twist. The girls were presented with envelopes, with each containing the name of a male Islander. The name written inside of the envelope determined who their partner would be.
