= Love Island Adria =

2026 Croatian-Serbian-Slovenian reality show

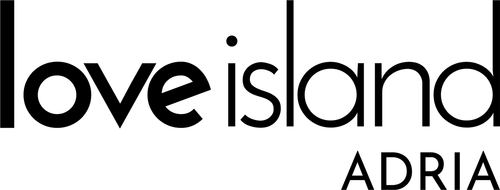
- The official logo for the series on Voyo
- Genre: Dating reality show
- Based on: Love Island by ITV Studios
- Presented by: Dragana Mićalović; Andrija Jović (digital host)
- Starring: List of Islanders
- Narrated by: Saša Lozar (Croatia); Filip Ugrenović (Serbia)
- Music by: Andrei Basirov; Toby Jarvis
- Countries of origin: Croatia; Serbia; Slovenia
- Original languages: Croatian; Serbian
- No. of seasons: 1
- No. of episodes: 48

Production
- Executive producers: Richard Cowles; Tom Gould; Sarah Tyekiff; Ali Hill; Martin Oxley
- Producers: Vanja Meandžija; Kateřina Pavlík
- Production locations: Tenerife, Canary Islands, Spain
- Running time: 46–76 minutes
- Production companies: ITV Studios; RTL Hrvatska; GAL Media

Original release
- Network: Voyo
- Release: 13 September 2026 – present

Related
- Love Island (franchise); Bombshell

Love Island Adria is an international reality television show. Based on the Love Island franchise, the show features contestants from Croatia, Serbia, Slovenia and the rest of the region as they enter a luxurious island villa in order to find love and compete in various challenges.

The show is hosted by Dragana Mićalović, while Andrija Jović serves as the digital host. Saša Lozar and Filip Ugrenović serve as the Croatian and Serbian narrator, respectively. It premiered on 13 September 2026 on Voyo. The Tenerife island serves as the show's main location.

The second season was confirmed in the finale of the first on 6 November 2026.

== Production and release ==
On 9 February 2026, an article by C21Media announced that the Croatian television network RTL has ordered a local version of Love Island. RTL confirmed the series in April 2026. Auditions were opened the same month with the deadline of 1 September 2026. Contestants were required to be at least 18 years of age and speak either Croatian or Serbian, with Slovene welcomed as long as it is "comprehensible to the rest of the in the villa." The island of Tenerife was confirmed as the show's filming location.

On 17 August 2026, Serbian actress Dragana Mićalović was confirmed to host the series. On 27 August 2026, a premiere date of 13 September 2026 was announced. Aside from online release on Voyo, the show is also broadcast by RTL in Croatia, Prva in Serbia and Pop in Slovenia.. Filip Ugrenović writes all of the commentaries and narrates the Serbian version while Saša Lozar is the narrator for the Croatian version .

== Islanders ==
Ten Islanders entered the villa on the first day. The first "bombshell" entered later on the same day.

Stefan Dražić was removed from the villa on Day 24 after an unspecified production rulebreak.

Islander	Age	Hometown	Entered	Exited	Status
Teodora "Drina" Jevđović	22	Čačak, Serbia (Note: Originally from Arilje, Serbia)	Day 1	Day 48	Winner
Valentin Stets	24	Novi Sad, Serbia (Note: Originally from Belarus)	Day 1	Day 48	Winner
Gašper Širovnik	28	Ljubljana, Slovenia	Day 1	Day 48	Runner-up
Anja Širovnik	27	Velenje, Slovenia	Day 10	Day 48	Runner-up
Milica "Mili" Pržić	26	Smederevo, Serbia	Day 1	Day 48	Third place
Luka Vrbanić	28	Pula, Croatia (Note: Originally from Zagreb, Croatia)	Day 7	Day 48	Third place
Anthony Atakpu	22	London, England (Note: Originally from Užice, Serbia)	Day 1	Day 48	Fourth place
Alja Šlebnik	25	Radlje ob Dravi, Slovenia	Day 3	Day 48	Fourth place
Leonarda Car	27	Samobor, Croatia	Day 37	Day 45	Dumped
Matija Grujić	25	Novi Sad, Serbia	Day 37	Day 45	Dumped
Lidia Trifunović	30	Belgrade, Serbia	Day 29	Day 43	Dumped
Stefan Vortić	24	Belgrade, Serbia	Day 29	Day 43	Dumped
Lara Maksimović	19	Belgrade, Serbia	Day 1	Day 39	Dumped
Nikola Denković	27	Sokobanja, Serbia (Note: Grew up in Italy)	Day 20	Day 34	Dumped
Toni Geršić	19	Pula, Croatia	Day 20	Day 20	Dumped
Toni Geršić	19	Pula, Croatia	Day 23 (Note: Dumped Islander Toni re-entered the villa after being voted to re-enter by the audience.)	Day 33	Re-dumped
Anamarija Kastelic	26	Ljubljana, Slovenia	Day 26	Day 33	Dumped
Alisa Šahinović	23	Doboj, Bosnia and Herzegovina (Note: Grew up in Sacramento, California, U.S.)	Day 14	Day 29	Dumped
Stefan Dražić	22	Novi Sad, Serbia	Day 13	Day 24	Removed
Luka Joka	25	Zagreb, Croatia	Day 20	Day 20	Dumped
Luka Ivić	22	Klagenfurt, Austria	Day 7	Day 19	Dumped
Loren Zubonja	28	Sydney, Australia (Note: Originally from Croatia)	Day 1	Day 19	Dumped
Roberto Vucić	26	Zaprešić, Croatia	Day 1	Day 19	Dumped
Mijo Mioč	29	Frankfurt, Germany (Note: Originally from Šuica, Bosnia and Herzegovina)	Day 14	Day 16	Dumped
Tara Vera Jotanović	23	Montreal, Canada (Note: Originally from Teslić, Bosnia and Herzegovina)	Day 1	Day 11	Dumped
Jovan Nikolić	23	Bor, Serbia	Day 1	Day 10	Dumped
Marija Tereza Murina	28	Pelješac, Croatia	Day 3	Day 10	Dumped
Vukašin Nikolin	24	Zrenjanin, Serbia	Day 1	Day 7	Dumped

== Coupling and elimination history ==
	Week 1			Week 2			Week 3		Week 4		Week 5			Week 6		Week 7		Week 8			Final
	Day 1		Day 5	Day 7	Day 10	Day 11	Day 16	Day 19	Day 20	Day 22	Day 25	Day 28	Day 29	Day 33	Day 34	Day 37	Day 39	Day 43	Day 45	Day 46	Final
Drina	Valentin		Valentin	Safe		Valentin	Luka V.	Mili	Luka J.	Valentin	Valentin	Safe	Valentin	Nikola	Safe	Immune	Valentin	Lidia & Stefan V.	Alja & Anthony	Finalists	Winners (Day 48)
Valentin	Drina		Drina	Safe		Drina	Alisa	Mili	Immune	Drina	Drina	Safe	Drina	Lara	Safe	Immune	Drina	Lidia & Stefan V.	Alja & Anthony	Finalists	Winners (Day 48)
Anja	Not in Villa				Safe	Luka I.	Stefan D.	Mili	Nikola	Stefan D.	Nikola	Single	Gašper	Toni	Safe	Immune	Gašper	Lidia & Stefan V.	Alja & Anthony	Finalists	Runners-up (Day 48)
Gašper	Mili		Mili	Safe		Mili	Mili	Mili	Immune	Mili	Mili	Single	Anja	Lara	Safe	Immune	Anja	Lidia & Stefan V.	Alja & Anthony	Finalists	Runners-up (Day 48)
Luka V.	Not in Villa			Alja	Safe	Alja	Drina	Mili	Immune	Lara	Alisa	Single	Lidia	Lara	Safe	Immune	Mili	Leonarda & Matija	Alja & Anthony	Finalists	Third place (Day 48)
Mili	Gašper		Gašper	Safe		Gašper	Gašper	Vulnerable	Nikola	Gašper	Gašper	Single	Stefan V.	Nikola	Vulnerable	Immune	Luka V.	Leonarda & Matija	Alja & Anthony	Finalists	Third place (Day 48)
Alja	Not in Villa		Single	Luka V.	Safe	Luka V.	Luka I.	Luka I.	Toni	Nikola	Anthony	Safe	Anthony	Toni	Safe	Immune	Anthony	Leonarda & Matija	Vulnerable	Finalists	Fourth place (Day 48)
Anthony	Lara	Single	Lara	Safe		Lara	Lara	Mili	Immune	Alisa	Alja	Safe	Alja	Lara	Safe	Immune	Alja	Leonarda & Matija	Vulnerable	Finalists	Fourth place (Day 48)
Leonarda	Not in Villa																Matija	Lidia & Stefan V.	Vulnerable	Dumped (Day 45)	
Matija	Not in Villa																Leonarda	Lidia & Stefan V.	Vulnerable	Dumped (Day 45)	
Lidia	Not in Villa												Luka V.	Nikola	Safe	Immune	Stefan V.	Leonarda & Matija	Dumped (Day 43)		
Stefan V.	Not in Villa												Mili	Lara	Vulnerable	Immune	Lidia	Leonarda & Matija	Dumped (Day 43)		
Lara	Anthony	Jovan	Anthony	Safe		Anthony	Anthony	Mili	Toni	Luka V.	Toni	Safe	Toni	Single	Safe	Vulnerable	Single	Dumped (Day 39)			
Nikola	Not in Villa								Vulnerable	Alja	Anja	Single	Anamarija	Single	Vulnerable	Dumped (Day 34)					
Toni	Not in Villa								Vulnerable	Dumped (Day 20)	Lara	Safe	Lara	Single	Re-dumped (Day 33)						
Anamarija	Not in Villa											Single	Nikola	Single	Dumped (Day 33)						
Alisa	Not in Villa						Valentin	Mili	Nikola	Anthony	Luka V.	Single		Dumped (Day 29)							
Stefan D.	Not in Villa						Anja	Luka I.	Immune	Anja	Removed (Day 24)										
Luka J.	Not in Villa								Vulnerable	Dumped (Day 20)											
Luka I.	Not in Villa			Tara	Safe	Anja	Alja	Vulnerable	Dumped (Day 19)												
Loren	Roberto		Roberto	Safe		Roberto	Roberto	Vulnerable	Dumped (Day 19)												
Roberto	Loren		Loren	Safe		Loren	Loren	Vulnerable	Dumped (Day 19)												
Mijo	Not in Villa						Single	Dumped (Day 16)													
Tara	Vukašin		Vukašin	Luka I.	Safe	Single	Dumped (Day 11)														
Jovan	Not in Villa	Lara	Marija Tereza	Safe	Vulnerable	Dumped (Day 10)															
Marija Tereza	Not in Villa		Jovan	Safe	Vulnerable	Dumped (Day 10)															
Vukašin	Tara		Tara	Single	Dumped (Day 7)																
Notes	(Note: On Day 1, the Islanders entered the villa. After the Islanders initially coupled up, bombshell Jovan entered with the choice to steal one islander. Jovan chose Lara, leaving Anthony single.)		N/A	(Note: On Day 7, bombshells Luka I. and Luka V. were given the chance to steal a girl to couple up with. Luka V. chose Alja, while Luka I. stole Tara from Vukašin, who therefore remained single and was dumped from the island.)	(Note: On Day 10, after an audience vote for which couple is their favorite, Jovan and Marija Tereza were dumped from the island after receiving the least votes.)	N/A		(Note: On Day 19, it was revealed that the audience had been voting for which Islanders they wanted to remain in the villa. As Roberto and Loren received the fewest votes, they were automatically dumped. It was then up to the safe Islanders to decide which islander would be dumped out of Luka I. and Mili, who received the second fewest votes. As the Islanders chose to save Mili, Luka I. was dumped from the island.)	(Note: On Day 20, the girls had to vote for which bombshell they wanted to remain in the villa. As Nikola received the most votes, Luka J. and Toni were dumped from the island.)	N/A	(Note: On Day 24, Stefan D. was removed from the villa for violating unspecified production rules, leaving Anja single.)	(Note: On Day 28, after the audience voted for the couples with the most potential, Mili and Gašper, Alisa and Luka V., and Anja and Nikola received the fewest votes and were automatically uncoupled.)	(Note: On Day 29, Valentin was given first pick at the recoupling after being voted by the audience as the islander who was most in love with their partner. He was followed by Lidia, Stefan V. and Anamarija, who were given priority as bombshells. Finally, the remaining boys chose from the remaining girls, excluding the partners they had been uncoupled from the previous day.)	(Note: On Day 33, after Lara and Toni had slept separately two nights in a row, they were automatically uncoupled. Later that day, Anamarija and Nikola won the fewest votes in the audience vote for the most exciting couple in the villa, and were automatically uncoupled. It was then up to the safe guys to choose between Lara and Anamarija, and the safe girls to choose between Toni and Nikola, who to keep in the villa. The boys unanimously chose Lara, while the girls chose Nikola.)	(Note: On Day 34, the boys answered questions about each other's qualities, based on which a ranking list was created by the production. As Nikola and Stefan V. placed lowest on the ranking list, Nikola was dumped because he was single, while Stefan V. was given time until the next Hotlist episode to work on his relationship with Mili.)	(Note: On Day 35, due to the time Lara had spent single, the audience got to vote whether or not she should remain in the villa. On Day 37, it was revealed that the audience voted for her to stay.)	N/A	(Note: Islanders in couples voted for the least compatible couple. As Leonarda and Matija, and Lidia and Stefan V. received the most votes, the audience voted for the couple they wanted to remain in the villa. On Day 43, Leonarda and Matija were revealed to have won the vote, meaning that Lidia and Stefan V. were dumped.)	(Note: On Day 45, it was revealed that the audience voted for the couples they wanted to make it to the final. As Alja and Anthony, and Leonarda and Matija received the fewest audience votes, it was up to the safe couples to decide who they wanted to keep in the villa. Alja and Anthony won the vote unanimously, meaning that Leonarda and Matija were dumped.)	(Note: On Day 46, the four final couples were formally notified of their status as finalists, which had been revealed to the audience the previous day.)	
Removed	None										Stefan D.	None									
Dumped	No; Dumping			Vukašin; Failed to couple up	Jovan & Marija Tereza; Fans’ choice to dump	Tara; Failed to couple up	Mijo; Failed to couple up	Roberto & Loren Fans’ choice to dump	Luka J. & Toni; Girls’ choice to dump	No; Dumping			Alisa; Failed to couple up	Anamarija; Boys’ choice to dump	Nikola; Boys’ choice to dump	No; Dumping	Lara; Failed to couple up	Lidia & Stefan V. Fans’ choice to dump	Leonarda & Matija Islanders’ choice to dump	No; Dumping	
Dumped	No; Dumping			Vukašin; Failed to couple up	Jovan & Marija Tereza; Fans’ choice to dump	Tara; Failed to couple up	Mijo; Failed to couple up	Luka I. Islanders’ choice to dump	Luka J. & Toni; Girls’ choice to dump	No; Dumping			Alisa; Failed to couple up	Toni; Girls’ choice to dump	Nikola; Boys’ choice to dump	No; Dumping	Lara; Failed to couple up	Lidia & Stefan V. Fans’ choice to dump	Leonarda & Matija Islanders’ choice to dump	No; Dumping	
Ref																					

== Episodes ==
No.	Title	Day(s)	Original release date
Week 1
1	"Episode 1"	Day 1	13 September 2026
2	"Episode 2"	Day 2	14 September 2026
3	"Episode 3"	Day 3	15 September 2026
4	"Episode 4"	Day 4	16 September 2026
5	"Episode 5"	Day 5	17 September 2026
6	"Episode 6: Hotlist"	Day 6	18 September 2026
Week 2
7	"Episode 7"	TBA	20 September 2026
8	"Episode 8"	TBA	21 September 2026
9	"Episode 9"	TBA	22 September 2026
10	"Episode 10"	TBA	23 September 2026
11	"Episode 11"	TBA	24 September 2026
12	"Episode 12: Hotlist"	TBA	25 September 2026
Week 3
13	"Episode 13"	TBA	27 September 2026
14	"Episode 14"	TBA	28 September 2026
15	"Episode 15"	TBA	29 September 2026
16	"Episode 16"	TBA	30 September 2026
17	"Episode 17"	TBA	1 October 2026
18	"Episode 18: Hotlist"	TBA	2 October 2026
Week 4
19	"Episode 19"	TBA	4 October 2026
20	"Episode 20"	TBA	5 October 2026
21	"Episode 21"	TBA	6 October 2026
22	"Episode 22"	TBA	7 October 2026
23	"Episode 23"	TBA	8 October 2026
24	"Episode 24: Hotlist"	TBA	9 October 2026
Week 5
25	"Episode 25"	TBA	11 October 2026
26	"Episode 26"	TBA	12 October 2026
27	"Episode 27"	TBA	13 October 2026
28	"Episode 28"	TBA	14 October 2026
29	"Episode 29"	TBA	15 October 2026
30	"Episode 30: Hotlist"	TBA	16 October 2026
Week 6
31	"Episode 31"	TBA	18 October 2026
32	"Episode 32"	TBA	19 October 2026
33	"Episode 33"	TBA	20 October 2026
34	"Episode 34"	TBA	21 October 2026
35	"Episode 35"	TBA	22 October 2026
36	"Episode 36: Hotlist"	TBA	23 October 2026
Week 7
37	"Episode 37"	TBA	25 October 2026
38	"Episode 38"	TBA	26 October 2026
39	"Episode 39"	TBA	27 October 2026
40	"Episode 40"	TBA	28 October 2026
41	"Episode 41"	TBA	29 October 2026
42	"Episode 42: Hotlist"	TBA	30 October 2026
Week 8
43	"Episode 43"	TBA	1 November 2026
44	"Episode 44"	TBA	2 November 2026
45	"Episode 45"	TBA	3 November 2026
46	"Episode 46"	TBA	4 November 2026
47	"Episode 47"	TBA	5 November 2026
48	"Episode 48"	TBA	6 November 2026

== Weekly summary ==
The main events in the Love Island Adria villa are summarised in the table below.

Week 1	Entrances	On Day 1, Mili, Loren, Tara, Lara, Drina, Vukašin, Anthony, Roberto, Valentin and Gašper entered the villa. Jovan entered the same day after the initial coupling.; On Day 3, Marija Tereza and Alja entered the villa.
Week 1	Coupling	On Day 1, the Islanders coupled up for the first time. As each of the boys entered, they were asked to choose a girl to pair up with. Vukašin chose Lara, but Anthony immediately "stole" her. Roberto chose Loren. Valentin chose Mili, but Gašper immediately "stole" her. The boys who remained single were given another pick; Vukašin chose Tara, leaving Valentin with Drina. At the end of the day, Jovan, who entered after the coupling, had to steal one girl for himself. He chose Lara, leaving Anthony single.; On Day 5, the Islanders recoupled, with the boys picking which girl they'd like to be with. Gašper and Mili, Roberto and Loren, Valentin and Drina, and Vukašin and Tara remained together, meanwhile Jovan chose Marija Tereza. Anthony chose to couple with Lara again, leaving Alja single. His choice was only shown in episode 7.
Week 1	Challenges	On Day 2, the Islanders participated in "Icebreaker" where they would draw questions from a tank filled with ice, and asked either the boys or the girls to raise their hand if the question applies to them.; On Day 3, the Islanders participated in a game where they were all blindfolded, then raised their hand if they wanted to continue. Those who raised their hand would, one by one, take off their blindfold and kiss anyone they wished to - they were allowed to kiss multiple people. After all of them did so, the two new bombshells were also allowed to have a turn.; On Day 4, the bombshells who entered the previous day got to choose three boys each to make them lunch - one for the entrée, one for the main course and one for the dessert. If they both picked the same boy for the same course, he would choose one of them, and the other had to repick.; On Day 4 as well, the Islanders competed in "Coconut" where couples had to move a coconut from their stomach to their lips and hold it together, while their hands are tied behind their back.; On Day 5, the Islanders participated in a challenge in which the girls would slide down a rubber water slide, then each would get two questions where they had to spill a water bucket on the girl (for the first question) and the boy (for the second question) which they felt it described the most. Afterwards, each girl threw a pitchfork onto a target with the pictures of all the boys, and had to kiss whichever one they hit.
Week 1	Dates	On Day 3, Lara and Anthony went on a date outside the villa.; On Day 3 as well, new Islanders Alja and Marija Tereza had to pick an islander each to take on a date. They chose Anthony and Roberto respectively.
Week 1	Exits	None.
Week 2	Entrances	On Day 7, Luka V. and Luka I. entered the villa.; On Day 10, Anja entered the villa.
Week 2	Coupling	On Day 7, new Islanders Luka and Luka I. each had to couple up with an islander. Luka V. coupled with Alja, while Luka I. stole Tara, leaving Vukašin single.; On Day 11, the Islanders recoupled, with the boys picking which girl they'd like to be with. Gašper and Mili, Anthony and Lara, Luka V. and Alja, Roberto and Loren, and Valentin and Drina remained together, while Luka I. chose to couple up with Anja, leaving Tara single.
Week 2	Challenges	On Day 7, the boys had to dress up as different professions and perform striptease for the girls. After they all had a go, the two new bombshells were also given a turn.; On Day 8, the Islanders participated in "And That's Me". Valentin and Drina had to order the Islanders based on how many times they did a certain thing in a relationship. The other Islanders were allowed to give their input.; On Day 9, the Islanders had to each say two lies and one truth about themselves. Whoever guessed each islander's truth was allowed to kiss them.; On Day 10, the Islanders participated in "Ice Ice Baby". The girls had to pick up an ice cube with their mouth and drag it across the body of their partner, who wasn't allowed to move.; On Day 11, the girls had to slide to four "home-run" bases, each containing a different boy of their choice. At the first base, the two had to find a baseball, hold it together with their lips and get it into a baseball glove. At the second base, the girl had to take of the boy's clothes and squirt him with mustard, while he's squirting her with ketchup. At the third base, the two had to share a gum candy like spaghetti, and at the fourth base the two had to kiss.
Week 2	Dates	On Day 9, Valentin and Drina went on a date outside the villa, following the Islanders' vote on which couple should get to.; On Day 10, new islander Anja had to choose a boy to take on a date. She chose Roberto.
Week 2	Exits	On Day 7, following the new bombshell stealing his current couple, Vukašin was single and dumped from the villa.; On Day 10, Jovan and Marija Tereza were dumped from the villa after getting the least votes from the audience on which couple is their favorite.; On Day 11, Tara was dumped from the villa after remaining single following the recoupling.
Week 3	Entrances	On Day 13, Stefan D. entered the villa.; On Day 14, Alisa and Mijo entered the villa.
Week 3	Coupling	On Day 16, the Islanders recoupled, with the girls picking which boy they'd like to be with. Before their choice, Alisa was voted by the audience to pick first; she chose Valentin. Loren and Roberto, Mili and Gašper, and Lara and Anthony remained together, while Anja chose Stefan D. and Drina, having had her couple stolen, chose Luka V. Alja chose Luka I., leaving Mijo single.
Week 3	Challenges	On Day 13, all Islanders had to get blindfolded and feel the body of all the Islanders of the opposite gender to guess who they were.; On Day 14, Lara, Anthony, Alja and Valentin were voted by the audience to each do a secret task - respectively, to tell all Islanders of the opposite gender they are sexy, to smell the hair of each islander of the opposite gender, to hug an islander of the opposite gender (who is not their partner) and not let go until it becomes awkward, and to let an islander of the opposite gender (who is not their partner) massage their legs while they let out questionable sounds.; On Day 14 as well, the Islanders played "The Tower of Truth" where thezy had to pull a tile from a wooden tower game and ask their partner the question that was under that number on the board. The single Islanders had to give their question to another islander.; On Day 15, all the boys had to do yoga, coached by Alja.; On Day 16, the Islanders participated in "Booty Fight". Pairs of the same gender had to enter a slime pool filled with balloons and pop them using their butts. One balloon in each round contained a token; whoever found it got to pick one islander to have a secret of theirs revealed. Because there was an odd number of girls, Alja played twice.; On Day 17, the couples had to grab a floaty and swim as fast as they could to the end of the pool to ring a bell. Anthony and Lara did not compete as they hosted.
Week 3	Dates	On Day 13, Stefan D. took Loren and Drina out for breakfast.; On Day 13 as well, Stefan D. had to choose one girl to take on a date by the pool. He chose Anja.; On Day 14, Alisa was voted by the previous Islanders out of the three newest bombshells to choose a boy to take on a date outside the villa the following day. She chose Valentin.
Week 3	Exits	On Day 16, Mijo was dumped from the villa after failing to couple up. This was only revealed in episode 17.
Week 4	Entrances	On Day 20, Toni, Luka J. and Nikola entered the villa.; On Day 23, Toni re-entered the villa after winning the audience vote between himself and Luka J. This was only shown in episode 24.
Week 4	Coupling	On Day 22, the Islanders recoupled, with the girls choosing the boy they'd like to be with. This was only shown in episode 23. Mili and Gašper, and Anja and Stefan D. remained together, while Drina coupled back up with Valentin, Alja chose Nikola, and Alisa chose Anthony, leaving Lara with Luka V.
Week 4	Challenges	On Day 19, the Islanders competed in a three-round race. The team captains were Gašper and Mili.; On Day 21, the Islanders had to pass a piece of paper to each other with their lips. Whoever dropped it had to do a challenge. Alja and Nikola did not participate as they were on a date.; On Day 22, the Islanders participated in "Crazy Ride". Couples (or singles in the case of Nikola and Alja) had to get into a toy car and read two social media comments, then guess which Islanders they were about. Those Islanders had to go into a "car wash" and be splashed with slime. It was then revealed which Islanders the comments were about.; On Day 23, Drina got a secret assignment to convince the Islanders to do things and record them with her phone. She had to make 2 couples kiss, make one girl show a seductive look, and make all Islanders pose for a group photo where they are kissing the person next to them. The prize was earphones for all the girls.
Week 4	Dates	On Day 20, while the boys went outside the villa to play golf, the three new bombshells took part in speed dates with each of the girls.; On Day 21, Nikola got to pick one girl to take on a date outside the villa. He chose Alja.; On Day 22, after Drina won the audience vote for the favorite islander, she and Valentin got to go to the hideaway. This was only revealed in episode 23.
Week 4	Exits	On Day 19, Roberto and Loren were dumped from the villa after getting the least audience votes on which Islanders should stay in the villa. Luka I. and Mili got the next lowest number of votes, and their fate was to be decided by the Islanders. They chose to keep Mili in the villa, leaving Luka I. dumped. His elimination was only revealed in episode 20.; On Day 20, Luka J. and Toni were dumped from the villa right after their entry after not receiving enough votes from the girls.; On Day 24, Stefan D. was removed from the villa due to violating unspecified production rules. This was only revealed in episode 25.
Week 5	Entrances	On Day 26, Anamarija entered the villa.; On Day 29, Stefan V. and Lidia entered the villa.
Week 5	Coupling	On Day 25, the Islanders recoupled, with the girls choosing the boy they'd like to be with. Drina and Valentin, and Mili and Gašper remained together, while Lara chose Toni, Alja chose Anthony, Anja chose Nikola and Alisa was left with Luka V.; On Day 28, Mili and Gašper, Anja and Nikola, and Alisa and Luka V. were uncoupled and banned from recoupling with their previous partners at the next ceremony, after receiving the least audience votes on which couple has the most potential.; On Day 29, the Islanders recoupled. After winning the audience vote on who's the most in love with their partner, Valentin was chosen to go first; he chose to stay with Drina. The bombshells then had their turn; respectively, Lidia chose Luka V., Stefan V. chose Mili, and Anamarija chose Nikola. The remaining boys then chose the girl they wanted to be with; Anthony stayed with Alja, Toni stayed with Lara, and Gašper chose Anja, leaving Alisa single.
Week 5	Challenges	On Day 26, the girls got to do a catwalk for the boys.; On Day 27, the boys had to get blindfolded and each of the girls would kiss with them. The boys then had to rate the kisses.; On Day 28, Anamarija had to rank all the other Islanders in 4 categories: female body, male body, character, and honesty.; On Day 29, the Islanders participated in a game where the girls had to get over a seesaw to reach a sandpit from which they would dig up a snake plush and put it around the neck of the girl they thought was the biggest snake. Then they had to open a chest with a touchy question they needed to answer, and a diamond to give to one of the boys. The boy they chose would then have to pass through a slime pool with them, and lastly they would kiss under a waterfall.
Week 5	Dates	On Day 25, Toni got to choose a girl to take on a morning date outside the villa. He chose Lara.
Week 5	Exits	On Day 29, Alisa was dumped from the villa after failing to couple up.
Week 6	Entrances	None.
Week 6	Coupling	On Day 33, Lara and Toni were uncoupled after not sharing their bed for two days in a row. Later the same day, Anamarija and Nikola were uncoupled after receiving the least audience votes on who is the most exciting couple.
Week 6	Challenges	On Day 31, the girls had to perform striptease for the boys while their heart rate was measured.; On Day 32, the Islanders played "Kiss Marry Pie". The girls had to choose one boy to kiss, one whom they would be happiest to marry (by putting a fake ring on their finger), and one to throw a pie in his face.; On Day 33, after the audience voted to decide whether Valentin's hair would be buzzed off, cut with scissors or left uncut, the option to buzz it off received the most votes, and Luka V. subsequently buzzed off his hair.; On Day 33, Luka V. and Lidia each had a secret mission. Luka had to get a girl to come with him to 3 different rooms in the villa, tell him he's crazy, and exercise with him for 5 minutes, while Lidia had to get a boy to come with her to 3 different areas of the complex, say the word "genius" and spend 5 minutes with her in the pool; they did not have to choose the same islander for all their tasks. As Lidia completed her mission first, she won a trip outside the villa for all the girls the following day.; On Day 35, the boys had to pass a "flex polygon" which included lifting rubber weights, sliding down a firefighter pole, oiling his body, mixing a cereal meal while on a balance beam, answering one question about another boy, entering an ice bath, and taking a girl of his choice into a sauna.
Week 6	Dates	On Day 31, as Lidia raised Luka's heartbeat the highest in that day's challenge, they got to go to the hideaway. This was only shown in episode 32.; On Day 35, Drina and Valentin made their relationship official.
Week 6	Exits	On Day 33, Anamarija was dumped from the villa after the boys chose Lara to remain over her, and Toni was dumped from the villa after the girls chose Nikola to stay over him. His elimination was only shown in episode 34.; On Day 34, Nikola was dumped from the villa after being ranked lowest on a list based on the other boys' responses about each other's qualities. This was only shown in episode 35.
Week 7	Entrances	On Day 37, Matija entered the villa. Leonarda entered the villa later the same day; she was only revealed in episode 38.
Week 7	Coupling	
Week 7	Challenges	
Week 7	Dates	On Day 37, Lara and Alja were sent on a date with the new bombshell outside the villa. He then had to choose one of them to continue the date with; he chose Lara.; On Day 37 as well, whoever found the new bombshell first would get to go on a date with her; it was Stefan V. She was later allowed to choose one more boy to talk to; she chose Luka V.
Week 7	Exits	

== Bombshell ==
Bombshell
- Serbo-Croatian: Bombaškoljka
- Genre: Talk show
- Presented by: Nikola Grgić
- Country of origin: Croatia
- Original languages: Croatian; Serbian
- No. of seasons: 1
- No. of episodes: 6

Production
- Running time: 29–57 minutes

Original release
- Network: Voyo
- Release: 10 October 2026 – present

A companion show, Bombshell (Serbo-Croatian: Bombaškoljka / Бомбашкољка), premiered on Voyo on 10 October 2026. Hosted by Voyo editor Nikola Grgić, the series features interviews with contestants after their departure from the Love Island Adria villa, discussing their experiences on the show, relationships, future plans and opinions of other contestants.

=== Episodes ===
No.	Title	Original release date
1	"Loren and Roberto"	10 October 2026
2	"Tara and Vukašin"	17 October 2026
3	"Lara"	5 November 2026
4	"Nikola and Anamarija"	8 November 2026
5	"Drina and Valentin"	14 November 2026
6	"Anja and Gašper"	17 November 2026
7	"Mili and Luka"	19 November 2026
8	"Anthony and Alja"	21 November 2026
