= Národní házená =

2022 Czech sport comedy TV series

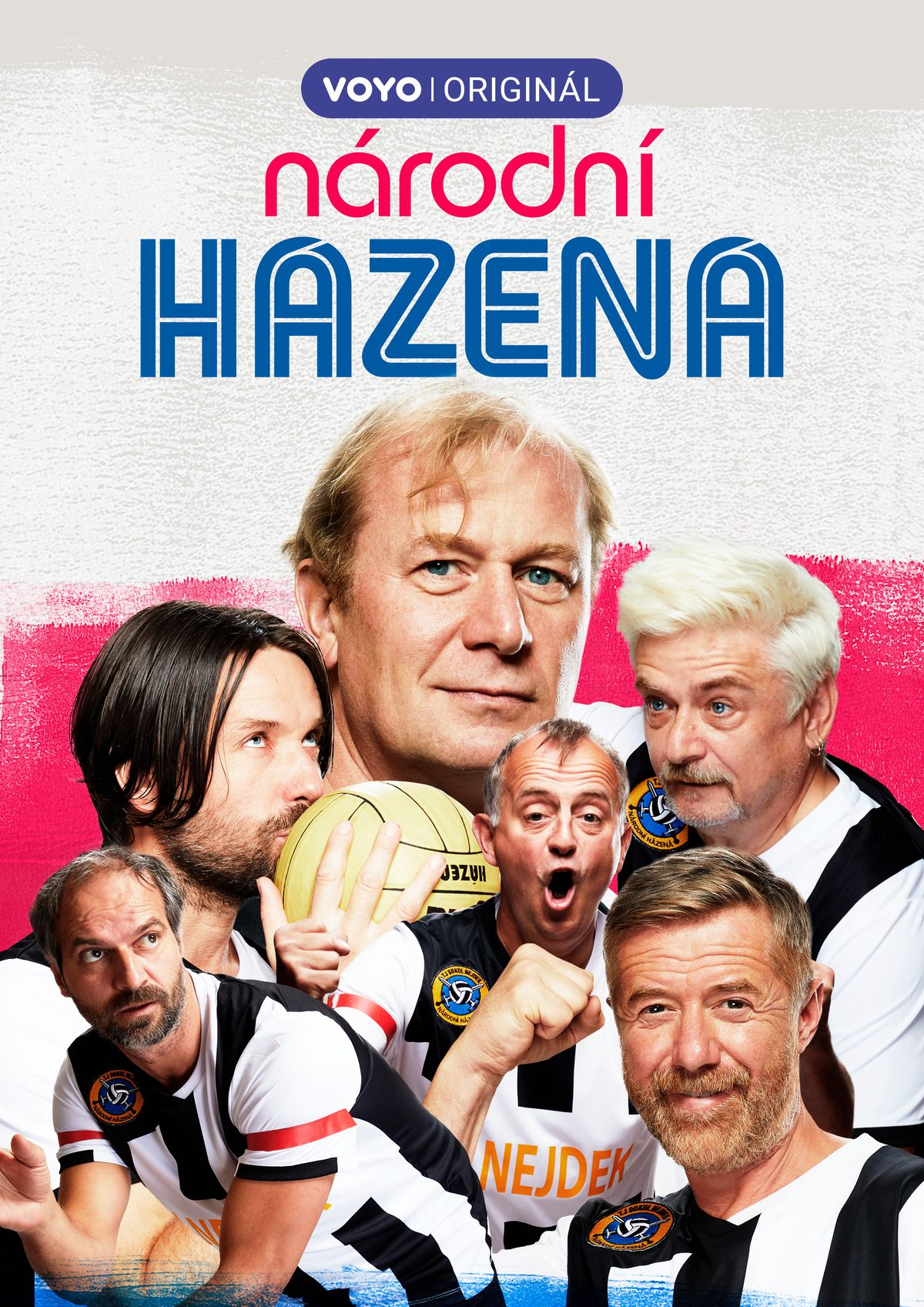
- Genre: Sport comedy
- Written by: Michal Suchánek
- Directed by: Vladimír Skórka; Michal Suchánek
- Starring: Michal Suchánek; Martin Pechlát; Jiří Langmajer; Václav Neužil; Jakub Špalek
- Country of origin: Czech Republic
- Original language: Czech
- No. of seasons: 1
- No. of episodes: 8

Production
- Running time: 30 minutes

Original release
- Network: Voyo
- Release: March 25 – April 15, 2022

Národní házená (National handball) is a 2022 sport comedy television series directed by Vladimír Skórka and Michal Suchánek, who is also the author of the screenplay based on the theme of Daniel Strejc. The series was made under brand Voyo Original and was broadcast on Voyo. It is the third series filmed under the banner Voyo Original.

The series starred Michal Suchánek, Martin Pechlát, Jiří Langmajer, Václav Neužil, Jakub Špalek, Petr Vršek, Sára Rychlíková, Veronika Žilková, Berenika Suchánková, Hana Igonda Ševčíková, Jitka Sedláčková, Filip František Červenka, Jitka Schneiderová, Linda Rybová, Filip Kaňkovský. The first two episodes appeared on Voyo on 25 March 2022. Last two episodes were broadcast on 15 April 2022.

The series was filmed in Říčany, Řevnice, Velvary and Bakov nad Jizerou.

== Cast ==
- Michal Suchánek as Horst Janatka
- Martin Pechlát as Antonín Haas
- Jiří Langmajer as JUDr. Miroslav Sirný
- Václav Neužil as Pavel Zedníček
- Jakub Špalek as František Rejsek
- Petr Vršek as Vladimír Krupička
- Sára Rychlíková as Petra Křížová, Horst's girlfriend
- Veronika Žilková as Marie Haasová, Antonín's wife
- Berenika Suchánková as Mirka Sirná, Miroslav's daughter
- Hana Igonda Ševčíková as Monika Sirná, Miroslav's wife
- Jitka Sedláčková as Helena Zedníčková, Pavel's mother
- Filip František Červenka as Jiří Krupička, Vladěna's son
- Jitka Schneiderová as Vilma Krupičková, Vladěna's ex-wife
- Linda Rybová as Libuše Rejsková, František's wife
- Filip Kaňkovský as football player Ladislav Šebesta
- Lukáš Bech as Ing. Viktor Bílek
- Josef Kaluža as Zdeněk Paděra
- Marek Taclík as taxikář Milan Halbich
- Petr Kolečko as Vojtěch Kříž
- Kateřina Janečková as Iva Křížová
- Luboš Veselý as Bc. Josef Kábrt
- Vladislav Georgiev as Josef Šiferle
- Richard Němec as Mgr. Inkognito Fekete
- Marek Holý as Luděk Staněk
- František Večeřa as Jaroslav Sádlo
- Michaela Sejnová as Karla Sádlová

== Episodes ==
No.	Title	Directed by	Written by	Original release date	Czech viewers (millions)
1	"Dopis"	Vladimír Skórka, Michal Suchánek	Michal Suchánek	March 25, 2022	N/A
2	"Trénink"	Vladimír Skórka, Michal Suchánek	Michal Suchánek	March 25, 2022	N/A
3	"Semafor"	Vladimír Skórka, Michal Suchánek	Michal Suchánek	April 1, 2022	N/A
4	"Hřiště"	Vladimír Skórka, Michal Suchánek	Michal Suchánek	April 1, 2022	N/A
5	"Gólman"	Vladimír Skórka, Michal Suchánek	Michal Suchánek	April 8, 2022	N/A
6	"Kraj"	Vladimír Skórka, Michal Suchánek	Michal Suchánek	April 8, 2022	N/A
7	"Příprava"	Vladimír Skórka, Michal Suchánek	Michal Suchánek	April 15, 2022	N/A
8	"Na Sereď!"	Vladimír Skórka, Michal Suchánek	Michal Suchánek	April 15, 2022	N/A
