= Dragana Mićalović =

Serbian actress

- Драгана Мићаловић
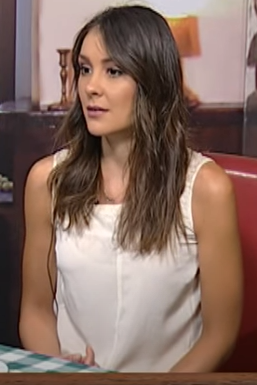
- Born: 3 March 1991 (age 35); Leskovac, SR Serbia, SFR Yugoslavia
- Occupations: Actress; TV host
- Years active: 2010–present
- Relatives: Sloboda Mićalović (sister)

Dragana Mićalović (Serbian Cyrillic: Драгана Мићаловић; born 3 March 1991) is a Serbian actress and TV host. Born in a family in which acting remains a strong tradition, Mićalović in her early youth pursued an acting career, portraying teenager Jelena in the Serbian show Priđi bliže. In early 2015, she gained notoriety in Serbia as Kasija Trkulja, a main character in the popular Serbian TV drama Sinđelići. She gained further regional notoriety by hosting Love Island Adria.

== Early life ==
Mićalović was born in Leskovac, to in a family of five. Her mother, Milica, is a hairdresser, and her father Dragan Mićalović was a prominent Serbian actor. She has two sisters, Mirjana Mićalović, who is a hotel manager, and Sloboda Mićalović, is also a successful actress. She moved to Belgrade at age 15 with her family, where she pursued acting. Initially, she rose to prominence with a lead role in Sinđelići.

== Filmography ==
=== Film ===
Year	Title	Role	Notes
2015	Marko Kraljević: Fantastična avantura	Verica	
2015	Nadja		Short film
2017	Zona Zamfirova 2	Dika	
2023	Dead or Alive	Ket	
2027	Povratak Žikine dinastije 2 †	Lela	Post-production

=== Television ===
Year	Title	Role	Notes
2010	Priđi bliže	Jelena	10 episodes
2011–2012	Nepobedivo srce	Anđa Simić	9 episodes
2013–2015	Zvezdara	Danica "Dana"	12 episodes
2015	Ko je kod Koje	Dragana	Mini-series; 9 episodes
2016–2019	Sinđelići	Kasija Trkulja	190 episodes
2017	Santa Maria della Salute	Princess Natalie	Mini-series; Episode 1.3
2017–2020	Ja volim Srbiju	Herself (contestant)	Game show; 4 episodes
2017	Tvoje lice zvuči poznato	Herself (contestant)	Season 4; 4th place
2018	Istine i laži	Viktorija	11 episodes
2018–2019	Urgentni centar	Petra	25 episodes
2019	Ekipizza	Minja	Mini-series; 3 episodes
2020–2025	Igra sudbine	Una Hristić	1,175 episodes (credited)
2022	Tajne vinove loze	Vera's mum	11 episodes
2022	Od jutra do sutra	Snežana "Žana"	70 episodes
2024	Radio Mileva	Jovana	Episode 4.35
2026–present	Love Island Adria	Herself (host)	Season 1
