= Damian Jackson (gridiron football) =

American gridiron football player (born 1997)

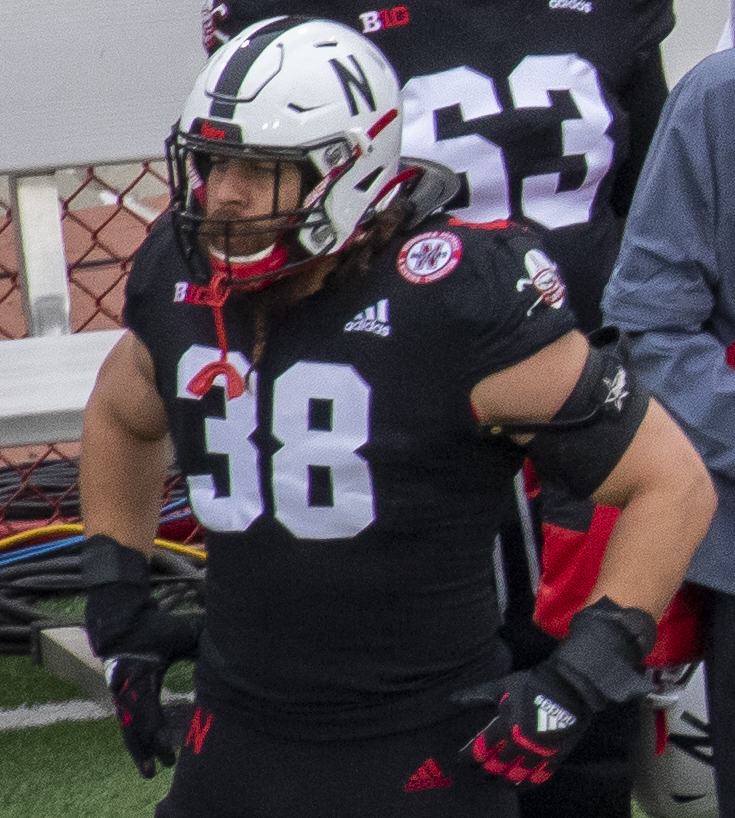
- Jackson with Nebraska in 2020

Profile
- Position: Fullback

Personal information
- Born: July 22, 1992 (age 34); Las Vegas, Nevada, U.S.
- Listed height: 6 ft 1 in (1.85 m)
- Listed weight: 251 lb (114 kg)

Career information
- High school: Shadow Ridge (Las Vegas, Nevada)
- College: Nebraska (2017–2021); Buffalo (2022)

Career history
- 2023: Winnipeg Blue Bombers

Awards and highlights
- Armed Forces Merit Award (2021)

Career CFL statistics
- Games played: 15
- Receptions: 3
- Receiving yards: 21
- Stats at CFL.ca

Damian Jackson (born July 22, 1992) is a retired American Navy SEAL and retired professional football fullback. Jackson played college football for Nebraska and Buffalo. He now works for 23XI Racing on the pit crew for Riley Herbst's No. 35 car in the NASCAR Cup Series.

== Early life ==
Damian Jackson was born on July 7, 1992, in Las Vegas, Nevada to Bridgette Saenz. Jackson attended Shadow Ridge High School, where he played baseball and soccer. After graduating high school, Jackson joined the Navy SEALs for four years.

== College career ==
After spending four years in the Navy, Jackson attended the University of Nebraska–Lincoln and played football there. In 2017, Jackson redshirted and thus did not play. The next year, Jackson played in his first and only game of the season. Jackson played in two games as a sophomore and was a finalist for the Armed Forces Award. In the shortened 2020 season, Jackson earned a scholarship and played in the last six games of the season. In his senior year, Jackson played in eleven games of the season and received the Armed Forces Merit Award. For his extra season given by the NCAA to all players who played in the shortened 2020 season, Jackson chose to transfer to and play football at the University at Buffalo. During his lone season at Buffalo, Jackson played in thirteen games and started nine as a defensive end.

== Professional career ==
After going undrafted in the 2023 NFL draft, Jackson was signed by the Winnipeg Blue Bombers before the season. Jackson made the final roster and was on the team during its run to the 2023 Grey Cup, which Winnipeg lost. He was released on February 16, 2024.

== See also ==
- List of United States Navy SEALs
