= Love Island USA season 8 =

2026 season of American reality television series

Love Island USA
- Season 8
- Promotional poster for the season
- Hosted by: Ariana Madix
- No. of contestants: 34
- Winners: Bryce Alakai Dettloff; Trinity Tatum
- Runners-up: Aniya Harvey; Carl Lee Schmidt
- No. of episodes: 36

Release
- Original network: Peacock
- Original release: June 2 – August 31, 2026

Season chronology
- ← Previous; Season 7

The eighth season of the American version of the television reality program Love Island premiered on June 2, 2026. The season is hosted by Ariana Madix.

== Format ==
Love Island is a reality television program where a group of contestants, who are referred to as "Islanders," are living in a villa in Fiji. The Islanders are cut off from the outside world and are under constant video surveillance. To survive in the villa, the islanders must be in a relationship with another islander. The Islanders couple up for the first time on first impressions but will later "re-couple" at special ceremonies where they can choose to remain with their current partners or to switch partners. At the villa, the couples must share a bed for sleeping and are permitted to talk with other Islanders at any time, allowing them to get to know everyone. While in the villa, each Islander has his or her own telephone, with which they can contact other Islanders via text and can receive text messages informing them of the latest challenges, dumpings, and re-couplings. The Islanders are limited in their communication with the outside world.

The Islanders are presented with many games and challenges that are designed to test their physical and mental abilities, after which the winners are sometimes presented with special prizes, such as a night at the Hideaway or a special date.

Islanders can be eliminated, or "dumped," for several reasons; these include remaining single after a re-coupling and by public vote through the Love Island mobile app. During the show's final week, members of the public vote to decide which couple should win the series; the couple who receive the most votes win.

== Islanders ==
The original islanders of the eighth season of Love Island USA. Top: Beatriz, Gabriel, Trinity, KC, Kenzie, Sincere and Aniya Bottom row: Zach, Melanie, Sean and Bryce

The original islanders were announced on May 28, 2026.

Islanders include Zach Georgiou, the brother of season 7 islander Charlie Georgiou, Aniya Harvey, the daughter of retired NBA player Donnell Harvey, Corey Sawyer Jr., the son of retired NFL player Corey Sawyer and cousin of season 6 islander Daniela Ortiz-Rivera, and Beatriz Hatz, a bronze medalist for Team USA's Paralympic track and field team.

Vasana Montgomery, a 25-year-old business owner from Beaverton, Oregon was originally announced as a contestant, however was removed from the series prior to entering the villa after several videos surfaced of her using racist language. As a result, Gabriel Vasconcelos entered on Day 2 as a bombshell due to an odd amount of islanders. Alannah Keyser was removed from the villa on Day 19 due to a video surfacing of her using racist language, as well as screenshots of her using the same language.

Islander	Age	Hometown	Entered	Exited	Status	Ref
Bryce Alakai	29	Honolulu, Hawaii	Day 1	Day 32	Winner	
Trinity Tatum	22	Newport News, Virginia	Day 1	Day 32	Winner	
Aniya Harvey	23	Tyrone, Georgia	Day 1	Day 32	Runner-up	
Carl Schmidt	28	Denver, Colorado	Day 21 (Note: Dumped Islanders Amora and Carl re-entered the villa after being voted to re-enter by America.)	Day 32	Runner-up	
Carl Schmidt	28	Denver, Colorado	Day 17	Day 20	Dumped	
Melanie Moreno	24	North Philadelphia, Pennsylvania	Day 1	Day 32	Third place	
Sincere Rhea	25	Cape May, New Jersey	Day 1	Day 32	Third place	
Kayda Bosse	22	Manchester, New Hampshire	Day 2	Day 32	Fourth place	
Zach Georgiou	26	Birmingham, United Kingdom	Day 1	Day 32	Fourth place	
Dylan Wrona	24	Naperville, Illinois	Day 17	Day 30	Dumped	
Kenzie Annis	24	Kennesaw, Georgia	Day 1	Day 30	Dumped	
KC Chandler	23	Fresno, California	Day 1	Day 30	Dumped	
Tierra Davis	25	Inglewood, California	Day 16	Day 30	Dumped	
Corbin Mims	22	Miami, Florida	Day 5	Day 26	Dumped	
Parmida Keshani	27	Isfahan, Iran (Note: Parmida Keshani is originally from Isfahan, Iran, but was residing in San Antonio, Texas at the time of casting and filming.)	Day 16	Day 26	Dumped	
Caleb McDaniel	21	Asheboro, North Carolina	Day 7	Day 25	Dumped	
Jaiden Bacciocco	22	Newbury Park, California	Day 16	Day 25	Dumped	
Amora Robinson	21	Atlanta, Georgia	Day 21	Day 25	Re-dumped	
Amora Robinson	21	Atlanta, Georgia	Day 16	Day 20	Dumped	
Gal Tshnieder	29	Houston, Texas	Day 17	Day 25	Dumped	
Jen Terry	23	Melbourne, Florida	Day 7	Day 25	Dumped	
Chay Nehra	27	San Diego, California	Day 17	Day 20	Dumped	
Corey Sawyer Jr.	24	Longwood, Florida	Day 17	Day 20	Dumped	
Ronnie Gunter	25	Shakopee, Minnesota	Day 17	Day 20	Dumped	
Sydney Eugene	25	Naples, Florida	Day 16	Day 20	Dumped	
Alannah Keyser	21	Miami, Florida	Day 16	Day 19	Removed	
Chandlar Wilson	26	Oklahoma City, Oklahoma	Day 17	Day 17	Dumped	
Keyon Harry	24	North Babylon, New York	Day 17	Day 17	Dumped	
Kyle Greene	26	Tampa, Florida	Day 17	Day 17	Dumped	
Ryan Ten Hulscher	27	Silver City, New Mexico	Day 17	Day 17	Dumped	
Tino Ellis	28	Queens, New York	Day 17	Day 17	Dumped	
Trae Taylor	23	Missoula, Montana	Day 17	Day 17	Dumped	
Gabriel Vasconcelos	26	Rio de Janeiro, Brazil (Note: Gabriel Vasconcelos is originally from Rio de Janeiro, Brazil, but was residing in Miami, Florida at the time of casting and filming.)	Day 2	Day 14	Dumped	
Sol Dean	24	Orange, California	Day 7	Day 14	Dumped	
Beatriz Hatz	25	Lakewood, Colorado	Day 1	Day 10	Dumped	
Sean Reifel	29	Easton, Pennsylvania	Day 1	Day 6	Dumped	

== Production ==
On March 13, 2026, Peacock renewed Love Island: USA for season eight with a premiere date of June 2, 2026. Ariana Madix returned as host for her third season with Iain Stirling once again providing narration. On May 9, 2026, it was announced that Maura Higgins would not return to the series to host Love Island: Aftersun this season. On May 11, 2026, it was announced that Summer House star Ciara Miller and Tefi Pessoa would be co-hosting Aftersun this season. On July 12, 2026, it was announced that there would be a reunion to air on August 31, 2026 on Peacock hosted by Ariana Madix and Andy Cohen.

== Coupling and elimination history ==
	Week 1			Week 2			Week 3		Week 4			Week 5	Final
	Day 1	Day 3	Day 6	Day 10	Day 13	Day 14	Day 17	Day 20	Day 25		Day 26	Day 30	Final
Bryce	Trinity		Trinity	Safe	Trinity	Safe	Safe	Trinity	Trinity	Amora & Gal; Caleb & Jaiden to dump	Kayda & Zach to save	Finalist	Winner (Day 32)
Trinity	Bryce		Bryce	Safe	Bryce	Safe	Safe	Bryce	Bryce	Amora & Gal; Caleb & Jaiden to dump	Kayda & Zach to save	Finalist	Winner (Day 32)
Aniya	KC		KC	Safe	KC	Safe	Safe	Single	Carl	Amora & Gal; Caleb & Jaiden to dump	Kayda & Zach to save	Finalist	Runner-up (Day 32)
Carl	Not in Villa						Vulnerable	Dumped (Day 20)	Aniya	Amora & Gal; Caleb & Jaiden to dump	Kayda & Zach to save	Finalist	Runner-up (Day 32)
Melanie	Sincere		Sincere	Vulnerable	Sincere	Safe	Safe	Sincere	Sincere	Amora & Gal; Dylan & Kenzie to dump	Kayda & Zach to save	Finalist	Third place (Day 32)
Sincere	Melanie		Melanie	Sol	Melanie	Safe	Safe	Melanie	Melanie	Amora & Gal; Dylan & Kenzie to dump	Kayda & Zach to save	Finalist	Third place (Day 32)
Kayda	Not in Villa	Zach	Zach	Safe	Zach	Safe	Safe	Zach	Zach	Amora & Gal; Caleb & Jaiden to dump	Vulnerable	Finalist	Fourth place (Day 32)
Zach	Kenzie	Kayda	Kayda	Safe	Kayda	Safe	Safe	Kayda	Kayda	Amora & Gal; Caleb & Jaiden to dump	Vulnerable	Finalist	Fourth place (Day 32)
Dylan	Not in Villa						Vulnerable	Kenzie	Kenzie	Amora & Gal; Parmida & Corbin to dump	Kayda & Zach to save	Eliminated	Dumped (Day 30)
Kenzie	Zach	Single	Corbin	Caleb	Corbin	Vulnerable	Safe	Dylan	Dylan	Amora & Gal; Parmida & Corbin to dump	Kayda & Zach to save	Eliminated	Dumped (Day 30)
KC	Aniya		Aniya	Safe	Aniya	Safe	Safe	Tierra	Tierra	Amora & Gal; Dylan & Kenzie to dump	Parmida & Corbin to save	Eliminated	Dumped (Day 30)
Tierra	Not in Villa						Safe	KC	KC	Amora & Gal; Dylan & Kenzie to dump	Parmida & Corbin to save	Eliminated	Dumped (Day 30)
Corbin	Not in Villa		Kenzie	Melanie to save	Kenzie	Vulnerable	Safe	Parmida	Parmida	Amora & Gal; Melanie & Sincere to dump	Vulnerable	Dumped (Day 26)	
Parmida	Not in Villa						Safe	Corbin	Corbin	Amora & Gal; Melanie & Sincere to dump	Vulnerable	Dumped (Day 26)	
Caleb	Not in Villa			Kenzie	Sol	Vulnerable	Safe	Jaiden	Jaiden	Amora & Gal; Dylan & Kenzie to dump	Dumped (Day 25)		
Jaiden	Not in Villa						Safe	Caleb	Caleb	Amora & Gal; Dylan & Kenzie to dump	Dumped (Day 25)		
Amora	Not in Villa						Safe	Dumped (Day 20)	Gal	Caleb & Jaiden; Melanie & Sincere to dump	Re-dumped (Day 25)		
Gal	Not in Villa						Vulnerable	Jen	Amora	Caleb & Jaiden; Melanie & Sincere to dump	Dumped (Day 25)		
Jen	Not in Villa			Gabriel	Gabriel	Vulnerable	Safe	Gal	Single	Dumped (Day 25)			
Chay	Not in Villa						Vulnerable	Single	Dumped (Day 20)				
Corey	Not in Villa						Vulnerable	Single	Dumped (Day 20)				
Ronnie	Not in Villa						Vulnerable	Single	Dumped (Day 20)				
Sydney	Not in Villa						Safe	Single	Dumped (Day 20)				
Alannah	Not in Villa						Safe	Removed (Day 19)					
Chandlar	Not in Villa						Vulnerable	Dumped (Day 17)					
Keyon	Not in Villa						Vulnerable	Dumped (Day 17)					
Kyle	Not in Villa						Vulnerable	Dumped (Day 17)					
Ryan	Not in Villa						Vulnerable	Dumped (Day 17)					
Tino	Not in Villa						Vulnerable	Dumped (Day 17)					
Trae	Not in Villa						Vulnerable	Dumped (Day 17)					
Gabriel	Not in Villa	Beatriz	Beatriz	Jen	Jen	Vulnerable	Dumped (Day 14)						
Sol	Not in Villa			Sincere	Caleb	Vulnerable	Dumped (Day 14)						
Beatriz	Sean	Gabriel	Gabriel	Vulnerable	Dumped (Day 10)								
Sean	Beatriz	Single		Dumped (Day 6)									
Notes	none	1	none	2	3	4	5	6	none	8	9	10	11
Removed	none							Alannah	none				
Dumped	No; Dumping		Sean; Failed to couple up	Beatriz; Corbin's choice to dump	No; Dumping	Gabriel; Girls' choice to dump	Chandlar, Keyon, Kyle, Ryan, Tino, Trae; Girls' choice to dump	Amora, Carl, Chay, Corey, Ronnie, Sydney; Failed to couple up	Jen; Failed to couple up	Amora & Gal; 8 of 9 votes to dump	Corbin & Parmida; 1 of 5 votes to save	Dylan & Kenzie, KC & Tierra; America's choice to dump	Kayda & Zach; Fewest votes to win
Dumped	No; Dumping		Sean; Failed to couple up	Beatriz; Corbin's choice to dump	No; Dumping	Gabriel; Girls' choice to dump	Chandlar, Keyon, Kyle, Ryan, Tino, Trae; Girls' choice to dump	Amora, Carl, Chay, Corey, Ronnie, Sydney; Failed to couple up	Jen; Failed to couple up	Amora & Gal; 8 of 9 votes to dump	Corbin & Parmida; 1 of 5 votes to save	Dylan & Kenzie, KC & Tierra; America's choice to dump	Melanie & Sincere; Third–most votes to win
Dumped	No; Dumping		Sean; Failed to couple up	Beatriz; Corbin's choice to dump	No; Dumping	Sol; Boys' choice to dump	Chandlar, Keyon, Kyle, Ryan, Tino, Trae; Girls' choice to dump	Amora, Carl, Chay, Corey, Ronnie, Sydney; Failed to couple up	Jen; Failed to couple up	Caleb & Jaiden; 4 of 9 votes to dump	Corbin & Parmida; 1 of 5 votes to save	Dylan & Kenzie, KC & Tierra; America's choice to dump	Aniya & Carl; Second–most votes to win
Dumped	No; Dumping		Sean; Failed to couple up	Beatriz; Corbin's choice to dump	No; Dumping	Sol; Boys' choice to dump	Chandlar, Keyon, Kyle, Ryan, Tino, Trae; Girls' choice to dump	Amora, Carl, Chay, Corey, Ronnie, Sydney; Failed to couple up	Jen; Failed to couple up	Caleb & Jaiden; 4 of 9 votes to dump	Corbin & Parmida; 1 of 5 votes to save	Dylan & Kenzie, KC & Tierra; America's choice to dump	Bryce & Trinity; Most votes to win

=== Notes ===
- ^Note 1: Gabriel and Kayda entered the Villa after the initial coupling and had to recouple with one of the islanders who offered to be their partner. Gabriel decided to steal Beatriz and Kayda decided to steal Zach, leaving Sean and Kenzie single and vulnerable. As Trinity and Bryce were not chosen, they remained a couple.
- ^Note 2: America voted for which Islanders the new bombshells should couple up with. America chose Caleb to couple up with Kenzie, Sol to couple up with Sincere and Jen to couple up with Gabriel. This left Beatriz, Corbin and Melanie single and vulnerable. Corbin then had to choose a girl islander to couple up with. He chose Melanie, leaving Beatriz dumped from the villa.
- ^Note 3: On Day 13, Islanders recoupled by writing letters to who they wanted to couple up with. After not receiving a letter, Caleb and Sol were left single and vulnerable. However, they were given a second chance by recoupling together.
- ^Note 4: America voted for their favorite couple. The top four couples who received the most votes from America were granted safety. The four safe girls then had to decide which vulnerable boy to dump, choosing Gabriel, and the four safe boys had to decide which vulnerable girl to dump, choosing Sol.
- ^Note 5: On Day 17, the original girl islanders had to decided which six Casa Amor boys they wanted to stay in the main villa, while the other six Casa Amor boys would be dumped from the island. The original girls decided to dump Chandlar, Keyon, Kyle, Ryan, Tino and Trae.
- ^Note 6: As the final part for the Casa Amor twist in week 3, Casa Amor and the villa held two separate re-coupling ceremonies for the original islanders to choose whether to return to their previous partner or pick any new partner. Any of the 11 new islanders that remained single by the end of either ceremony was dumped from the villa. However, if one of the 12 original islanders remained single at the end of both ceremonies, they would still remain in the villa, but as a single islander. Amora, Carl, Chay, Corey, Ronnie, and Sydney remained single at the end the night, and were all dumped from the villa. Following the Casa Amor dumping, America was then given the chance to vote one girl islander and one boy islander back into the villa. As Amora and Carl received the most votes, they re-entered the villa.
- ^Note 8: On Day 25, the new couples voted for the two couples they thought were the least compatible. Amora and Gal, and Caleb and Jaiden received the most votes and were dumped from the villa.
- ^Note 9: America voted for their most compatible couple. As a result, the three couples with the fewest votes, Corbin and Parmida, Dylan and Kenzie, and Kayda and Zach, were all vulnerable. For winning the karaoke challenge, Dylan and Kenzie earned safety from the vote. The now five safe couples had to vote for who they wanted to save. As they received only one vote, Corbin and Parmida were dumped from the island.
- ^Note 10: America voted for the couples they wanted to see in the finale. The four couples who received the most votes were granted a spot in the final. Kenzie & Dylan and KC & Tierra received the fewest votes and were dumped from the villa.
- ^Note 11: America voted for which couple they think should win Love Island. The couple with the most votes were declared the winners of Love Island and received the grand prize money.

== Weekly summary ==
The main events in the Love Island USA villa are summarized in the table below.

Week 1	Entrances	On Day 1, Aniya, Beatriz, Bryce, KC, Kenzie, Melanie, Sean, Sincere, Trinity, and Zach entered the villa.; On Day 2, Gabriel and Kayda entered the villa.; On Day 5, Corbin entered the villa.; On Day 7, Caleb, Jen, and Sol entered the villa.
Week 1	Coupling	On Day 1, the islanders coupled up for the first time with the girls standing behind the door of the boy they would like to couple up with. Trinity chose Bryce, Beatriz chose Sean and Kenzie chose Zach. Melanie and Aniya both chose Sincere, leaving him to choose Melanie. This left Aniya and KC to couple up.; On Day 3, Gabriel and Kayda had to couple up with one of the islanders who offered to be their partner. Gabriel decided to steal Beatriz and Kayda decided to steal Zach, leaving Sean and Kenzie single. As Trinity and Bryce were not chosen, they remained a couple.; On Day 6, the islanders recoupled for the first time with the girls choosing who they would like to couple up with. However, as the newest islander, Corbin chose first. He chose to couple up with Kenzie. Aniya and KC, Melanie and Sincere, Trinity and Bryce, Beatriz and Gabriel, and Kayda and Zach all remained together. Sean was left single and dumped from the villa.
Week 1	Challenges	On Day 1, the islanders took part in a game in which Ariana asked them questions where they would stand in front of a door to lock in an answer. If any other gender was on the other side of the door, they would get to kiss one another.; On Day 4, the islanders took part in a game in which they had to answer a series of facts relating to their fellow islanders. The islander the thought the question related to would be pushed into the pool.; On Day 5, the islanders took part in a office style challenge where the girl islanders were tasked with selecting a boy not in their couple to kiss and then answer a question. The islander they chose would be thrown into a slime pit. The girl islanders would then go into a secret room and kiss the new bombshell, Corbin.
Week 1	Dates	On Day 3, bombshells Gabriel and Kayda got to take Beatriz and Zach on a date.
Week 1	Exits	On Day 6, following a recoupling, Sean was left single and was dumped from the island.
Week 2	Coupling	On Day 10, America voted for which Islanders the new bombshells should couple up with. America chose Caleb to couple up with Kenzie, Sol to couple up with Sincere and Jen to couple up with Gabriel. This left Corbin, Melanie, and Beatriz single and vulnerable. Corbin then had to choose a girl islander to couple up with. He chose Melanie leaving Beatriz dumped from the villa.; On Day 13, islanders recoupled by writing love letters to who they wanted to couple up with. Trinity and Bryce, Aniya and KC, Jen and Gabriel and Kayda and Zach mutually wrote letters to one another and remained in their couples. Corbin and Caleb each wrote letters to Kenzie while Kenzie only wrote a letter for Corbin and they recoupled. Sol and Melanie each wrote letters to Sincere while Sincere only wrote a letter to Melanie and they recoupled. As the only two islanders to not receive love letters, Sol and Caleb became the final couple.
Week 2	Challenges	On Day 10, the boy and girl islanders competed against each other in "Sweet as Pie" where they had to answer a series of questions about islanders of the opposite gender. If it was a "nice" round, they would lock in their answers with a kiss. However, if it was a "naughty" round, they would lock in their answers with a pie to the face.; On Day 11, the couples competed in a soccer style team challenge involving moving a soccer ball without their hands, eating a hot dog controlled by their legs, collecting slime from an inflatable pool, and dumping it on an islander who the couple thought fit the description of the "Red Card" question.
Week 2	Dates	On Day 11, Kayda and Zach were selected by their fellow islanders spend the night in the hideaway.
Week 2	Exits	On Day 10, Corbin chose to couple up with Melanie, leaving Beatriz single and dumped from the villa.; On Day 14, the top four couples who received the most votes from America were granted safety. The four safe girls then had to decide which vulnerable boy to dump, choosing Gabriel, and the four safe boys had to decide which vulnerable girl to dump, choosing Sol.
Week 3	Entrances	On Day 16, Alannah, Amora, Jaiden, Parmida, Sydney, and Tierra entered Casa Amor.; On Day 17, Carl, Chandlar, Chay, Corey, Dylan, Gal, Keyon, Kyle, Ronnie, Ryan, Tino and Trae entered the main villa.; On Day 21, Amora and Carl re-entered the villa after the public voted them back in.
Week 3	Coupling	On Day 20, as the final part for the Casa Amor twist, Casa Amor and the villa held two separate re-coupling ceremonies for the original islanders to choose whether to return to their previous partner or pick any new partner. Kayda and Zach, Melanie and Sincere and Trinity and Bryce all remained loyal to one another. Jen chose to recouple with Gal and Kenzie chose Dylan. Caleb brought Jaiden to the main villa, Corbin brought Parmida and KC brought Tierra.
Week 3	Challenges	On Day 21, Megan Thee Stallion hosted a girls vs boys challenge. In the first round, as they music play and once it stops, the islanders must sit on a cake. The girls won the first round. In the second round each team got to throw a cake at the opposing team members. The girls won the second round as well. In the final round, each team had to have a representative eat a cake to find a heart in the middle. The boys won the round.
Week 3	Exits	On Day 17, the original girl islanders had to decided which six Casa Amor boys they wanted to stay in the villa. The original girls chose Carl, Chay, Corey, Dylan, Gal and Ronnie to remain in the villa. This meant that Chandlar, Keyon, Kyle, Ryan, Tino and Trae were dumped from the villa.; On Day 19, Alannah was removed from the villa due to a resurfaced video of her using racist language.; On Day 20, Casa Amor islanders, Amora, Carl, Chay, Corey, Ronnie, and Sydney, remained single at the end the night, and were all dumped from the villa.
Week 4	Coupling	On Day 25, the islanders recoupled with the boys choosing which girl they wanted to couple up with. Kayda and Zach, Kenzie and Dylan, Melanie and Sincere, Jaiden and Caleb, Parmida and Corbin, Tierra and KC and Trinity and Bryce remained together. Carl chose to couple up with Aniya, whilst Gal chose to recouple with Amora.
Week 4	Challenges	On Day 26, the couples took part in a Karaoke Night Challenge. For winning, Kenzie & Dylan won safety from the nights vote.
Week 4	Dates	On Day 22, Trinity and Bryce left the villa to go on their first date.
Week 4	Exits	On Day 25, following a recoupling, Jen was left single and was dumped from the island.; On Day 25, following a vote for least compatible couple, Amora and Gal and Jaiden and Caleb were dumped from the island.; On Day 26, as they received only one vote for save from their fellow islanders, Parmida and Corbin were dumped from the villa.
Week 5	Dates	On Day 31, the four remaining couples went on their final dates.
Week 5	Exits	On Day 30, America voted for the four couples they would like to see in the finale. Kenzie & Dylan and KC & Tierra received the fewest amount of votes and therefore were dumped from the island.; On Day 32, Kayda and Zach finished in fourth place and Melanie and Sincere finished third. Bryce and Trinity were then announced as the winners, leaving Aniya and Carl as runners-up.

== Episodes ==
No. overall	No. in season	Title	Day(s)	Original release date	Prod. code
Week 1
235	1	"Episode 1"	Days 1–2	June 2, 2026	801
236	2	"Episode 2"	Days 2–3	June 3, 2026	802
237	3	"Episode 3"	Days 3–4	June 4, 2026	803
238	4	"Episode 4"	Days 4–5	June 5, 2026	804
239	5	"Episode 5"	Days 5–6	June 7, 2026	805
240	6	"Episode 6"	Days 6–7	June 8, 2026	806
Week 2
241	7	"Episode 7"	Days 7–8	June 9, 2026	807
242	8	"Episode 8"	Days 8–9	June 11, 2026	808
243	9	"Episode 9"	Days 9–10	June 12, 2026	809
244	10	"Episode 10: Aftersun"	N/A (Note: This episode showcased events from the previous days in the week. No new or present days were featured.)	June 13, 2026	810
245	11	"Episode 11"	Days 10–11	June 14, 2026	811
246	12	"Episode 12"	Days 11–12	June 15, 2026	812
247	13	"Episode 13"	Days 12–13	June 16, 2026	813
248	14	"Episode 14"	Days 13–14	June 18, 2026	814
Week 3
249	15	"Episode 15"	Days 14–15	June 19, 2026	815
250	16	"Episode 16: Aftersun"	N/A	June 20, 2026	816
251	17	"Episode 17"	Days 15–16	June 21, 2026	817
252	18	"Episode 18"	Days 16–17	June 22, 2026	818
253	19	"Episode 19"	Days 17–18	June 23, 2026	819
254	20	"Episode 20"	Days 18–19	June 25, 2026	820
255	21	"Episode 21"	Days 19–20	June 26, 2026	821
256	22	"Episode 22: Aftersun"	N/A	June 27, 2026	822
257	23	"Episode 23"	Days 20–21	June 28, 2026	823
Week 4
258	24	"Episode 24"	Days 21–22	June 29, 2026	824
259	25	"Episode 25"	Days 22–23	June 30, 2026	825
260	26	"Episode 26"	Days 23–24	July 2, 2026	826
261	27	"Episode 27"	Days 24–25	July 3, 2026	827
262	28	"Episode 28: Aftersun"	N/A	July 4, 2026	828
263	29	"Episode 29"	Days 25–26	July 5, 2026	829
264	30	"Episode 30"	Days 26–27	July 6, 2026	830
265	31	"Episode 31"	Days 27–28	July 7, 2026	831
Week 5
266	32	"Episode 32"	Days 28–29	July 9, 2026	832
267	33	"Episode 33"	Days 29–30	July 10, 2026	833
268	34	"Episode 34: Aftersun"	N/A	July 11, 2026	834
269	35	"Episode 35"	Days 30–32	July 12, 2026	835
Special
270	36	"Episode 36: Reunion"	N/A	August 31, 2026	836

== After filming ==
After winning the series, Trinity Tatum signed with the WME Group. She participated in campaigns for Maybelline and Verizon, and done pictorials for Interview magazines. In October, she was announced as an ambassador for Michelle Obama's "When We All Vote" organization.
