= Bryce Alakai =

American DJ (born 1996)

- Born: Bryce Alakai Dettloff; June 29, 1996 (age 30); Honolulu, Hawaii, U.S.
- Occupations: DJ; record producer; model; television personality
- Musical career
- Genres: House; EDM; deep house; melodic house; UKG; tech house
- Instruments: Keyboards; synthesizer; CDJ; digital audio workstation; sampler; drum machine
- Years active: 2014–present (model); 2022–present (DJ)
- Website: brycealakai.com

Bryce Alakai (born Bryce Alakai Dettloff; June 29, 1996) is an American DJ, music producer, model and television personality, known for winning the eighth season of the Peacock dating show Love Island USA in 2026.

== Early life and career ==
Bryce Alakai Dettloff was born on June 29, 1996, in Honolulu, Hawaii. He was raised in Las Vegas, Nevada after his family relocated when he was a child. Dettloff was raised primarily by his mother, Keri Becker, and his grandmother, Anne; he also has a brother, Mason. He graduated from Shadow Ridge High School in 2014. Prior to appearing on television, Dettloff worked as a handyman, construction worker, and electrician while also pursuing a career as a DJ and music producer.

Dettloff first began modeling at the age of eighteen after being signed with Wilhelmina Models in New York City and Los Angeles. Throughout his modeling career, he appeared in several editorial and commercial campaigns for fashion houses including Calvin Klein, DKNY, and Stuart Weitzman and brands such as Guess and Zara. In the mid–2010s, Dettloff's modeling portfolio gained prominent attention on sites like Tumblr and Wattpad. In 2022, Dettloff began releasing music as a professional DJ and music producer under the stage name Bryce Alakai. As a multi-instrumentalist, he began releasing his work through Spotify, fusing elements of house music, EDM and UK garage into his sound; he credits artists such as Skrillex, Fred again.. and Nu Aspect as inspiration. He has also performed alongside artists such as Don Toliver, Carlita and John Summit. In August 2026, he announced his first DJ tour, marking his debut North American headline run from August to December.

In May 2026, he was announced as one of the original islanders on the eighth season of the Peacock dating series Love Island USA. Upon leaving the villa, he was signed with United Talent Agency.

=== Love Island USA ===
In June 2026, Dettloff entered the Love Island USA villa as an original islander, coupling up with Trinity Tatum on Day 1. On Day 2, they agreed to explore other connections due to doubts regarding their age gap. After failing to connect with other islanders, they chose to recouple once again. Eventually, the two would grow to develop romantic feelings for one another; dubbed “Brinity” by viewers, the pairing became one of the season’s most popular couples. The couple received further praise during the Casa Amor segment when Dettloff and Tatum repeatedly expressed their desire to return to each other. Sally Darr Griffin of Today highlighted it as one of the season's most memorable moments, stating, "The best moment was hands down Trinity and Bryce both talking about how much they miss each other. Trinity was really vulnerable and talked about her fears of Bryce coupling up with someone new." On Day 19, Dettloff asked Tatum to be his girlfriend. Following the family day visits, the pair emerged as frontrunners. Dettloff’s grandmother, Anne, was also named as one of the highlights of the family visits due to her unfiltered personality. Morgan Pryor of TV Insider praised Anne's commentary, writing, "naturally, she stole the show." On Day 32, Dettloff and Tatum were crowned the winners of the eighth season.

== Personal life ==
Dettloff has been in a relationship with Trinity Tatum since June 2026, after meeting on the eighth season of Love Island USA.

== Discography ==
=== Singles ===
List of singles, showing year released, and originating album
Title	Year	Album	Label	Ref.
"Lucid"	2022	Non-album single	Alakai Records	
"Something More"	2023	Non-album single	Alakai Records	
"Blur"	2023	Non-album single	Alakai Records	
"Hold Me"	2023	Non-album single	Alakai Records	
"Coast"	2024	Non-album single	Get The Sound	
"Nothing Ever Changes"	2024	Non-album single	Get The Sound	
"Change Me"	2024	Non-album single	Lenient Tales	
"Lose My Mind"	2024	Non-album single	Get The Sound	
"In My Head"	2024	Non-album single	Alakai Records	
"Feels"	2025	Non-album single	Mutineer Music Group	
"Loving You"	2025	Non-album single	Alakai Records	
"Falling Back"	2025	Non-album single	Alakai Records	
"This Time"	2026	Non-album single	Alakai Records	

=== Remixes ===
Title	Year	Artist(s)	Label	Ref.
Blasé (Bryce Alakai Remix)	2026	Ty Dolla Sign	Atlantic Records	

== Filmography ==
=== Film ===
Film roles
Year	Title	Role	Notes	Ref.
2022	Alabama Rose	Henry		

=== Television ===
Year	Title	Role	Notes	Ref.
2019	The Other Two	Guy	Guest role	
2024–2026	The Third Eye: Major Arcana	The Stranger	Recurring role	
2026	Love Island USA	Contestant	Winner; season 8	
2026	Watch What Happens Live with Andy Cohen	Himself	Guest; 1 episode	
