= Nevada Millennium Scholarship =

U.S. state scholarship for Nevada in-state colleges

The Nevada Millennium Scholarship, also known as the Governor Guinn Millennium Scholarship, offers Nevada high school graduates free or reduced tuition to in-state universities and colleges like the University of Nevada, Reno and University of Nevada, Las Vegas.

In 1999, Governor Kenny Guinn’s Millennium Scholarship initiative was enacted into law by the Nevada Legislature; the legislation (NRS 396.911) created the Millennium Scholarship trust fund to be administered by the State Treasurer. In October 1999, the Board of Regents adopted policy guidelines for the administration of the scholarship.

To qualify for the scholarship:

1. You must graduate with a diploma from a Nevada class of the year 2000 or later;
2. You must earn at least a 3.25 GPA (weighted or unweighted) OR a qualifying test score of 1070 on the SAT or 21 on the ACT
3. Complete while in high school, 4 years of English, 4 years of Math (including Algebra II or higher), 3 years of science, and 3 years of history.
4. Be a resident of Nevada for at least two years.

The scholarship was created using the money that Nevada received from the Tobacco Master Settlement Agreement. Currently, the scholarship allows up to $80 per credit hour for eligible students with a total lifetime value of $10,000. It faces a projected funding shortfall by 2027 due to decreasing revenue from tobacco sales. State Treasurer Zach Conine has stated that the program's survival will require the legislature to either increase general fund appropriations or reduce the scholarship's overall costs.
