= Voyo =

Czech subscription video on demand service

- Website type: OTT streaming platform
- Country of origin: Czech Republic
- Area served: Bosnia and Herzegovina; Bulgaria; Croatia; Romania; Serbia; Slovakia; Slovenia
- Products: Streaming media; video on demand; digital distribution
- Parent: CME
- Website: Bosnia and Herzegovina Bulgaria; Croatia; Romania; Serbia; Slovakia; Slovenia
- Registration: Required
- Launched: August 1, 2011
- Current status: Active

Voyo is a Czech subscription video on demand service owned by Central European Media Enterprises (CME). Originally launched in the Czech Republic on 1 August 2011 as a free archive of programs produced by every national television channel owned by CME and a platform for live broadcasting of original programming and sports broadcasts, the service expanded through Bosnia and Herzegovina, Bulgaria, Croatia, Romania, Serbia, Slovakia, and Slovenia.

The service gradually transformed into a paid service modeled after the American Netflix. The range of available programs is regularly changed; according to the operator, there are more than 2,000 movies and series. The service also provides live broadcasts of sports channels. On the portal, it is also possible to watch films, series and programs a day or a week earlier than their television broadcast.

== In Czech Republic ==
From 2021, original series and feature films are released on Voyo under the label Voyo Originals, which are exclusively available only on this platform.

On 10 March 2025 the service was closed down and replaced by new service Oneplay which absorbed O2 Czech Republic's O2 TV as well as Voyo's previous content.

Voyo original programmingVoyo original programming produced in Czech Republic
Title	Genre	Premiere	Notes
Ordinace v růžové zahradě 2	Soap Opera	2 September 2019	Since season 17
The Roubal Case	Crime drama	26 November 2021	Based on case of serial killer Ivan Roubal.
Guru	Drama	14 January 2022	Based on case of Jaroslav Dobeš (known as Guru Jara).
Národní házená	Comedy	25 March 2022	
Iveta	Biographical drama	6 May 2022	Based on life of Iveta Bartošová. Renewed for season 3.
Jitřní záře	Drama	19 June 2022	
Gumy	Comedy	28 September 2022	
The King of Šumava: The Phantom of the Dark Land	Adventure Crime thriller	8 December 2022	Renewed for season 2 and 3.
Sex O´Clock	Comedy	10 March 2023	Renewed for season 2.
Vědma	Fantasy	16 June 2023	
Ondřej Sokol: Celebrity	Stand-up comedy	22 July 2023	
Matematika zločinu	Crime	28 July 2023	
Extraktoři	Action thriller	27 October 2023	
Metoda Markovič: Hojer	Crime	26 January 2024	
Policie Hvar	Crime	4 February 2024	
Případ Stodolovi	Documentary	15 March 2024	
Málo mě znáš	Documentary	7 April 2024	
Mozaika	Comedy	11 June 2024	
Kauza Kramný	Documentary	19 July 2024	
Záhadné případy	Mystery	27 October 2024	
Studna	Crime drama	20 January 2025	

== In Croatia and Serbia ==
In Croatia, the service was originally launched by Nova TV as OYO in 2011. OYO was closed down and replaced by Nova Plus in 2019.

In July 2023, the Croatian television network RTL announced that RTL Play is getting replaced with Voyo. Voyo launched in Croatia on 27 August 2023, with most of RTL's original television series (such as Sjene prošlosti, Život na vagi, and Ljubav je na selu) released on the service 24 hours before their television broadcast on RTL. The service offers a livestream of RTL's channels, as well as numerous foreign television series. RTL also broadcasts To je Voyo (English: This is Voyo), a short television programme that advertises new content available on Voyo.

RTL also launched the service in Serbia in November 2024. The Serbian iteration of Voyo offers the similar catalogue as the one in Croatia.

Voyo original programmingVoyo original programming produced in Croatia
Title	Genre	Premiere	Notes
Fight of Nations: Put do pobjede	Reality	27 July 2024	No RTL broadcast.
Dosje Jarak	Documentary	28 October 2024 (s. 2)	Seasons 2 and 3 released as Voyo exclusives.
Gospodin Savršeni	Reality	27 January 2025 (s. 4)	Seasons 4 and 5 released a week ahead of RTL premiere.
Cocktail Master	Reality	24 March 2025	No RTL broadcast.
Farma	Reality	19 May 2025 (s. 8)	Released ahead of RTL broadcast.
IQ 160	Crime comedy	24 July 2026	Branded as the first Croatian Voyo original.
Love Island Adria	Reality	13 September 2026	A multi-national reality show.
Bombshell	Talk show	10 October 2026	A companion show to Love Island Adria.

== In Slovenia ==
In Slovenia, the following television series are branded as Voyo originals:

- Alfa Mikić
- Gospod profesor
- Hiša ljubezni
- Ja, Chef!
- Lajf je tekma
- Lp, Lena
- Skečoholiki
- Telenovela: Patriot TV
- Telenovela: Superk***e
- Truplo
- V dvoje
- Vse punce mojga brata
- Za hribom
