= List of Love Island Australia contestants =

The following is a list of contestants that have appeared on the 9Go!, Nine Network, and 9Now reality series Love Island Australia. The youngest Islanders are Cartier Surjan and Angel Ellis-Holley, who were both 19 years old when they participated in the second season, whereas the oldest Islander is John James Parton who was 32 when he entered season one.

The youngest winners are Grant Crapp, Austen Bugeja, and Kye Lambert, who were all 22 years old when they won the first, fourth, and seventh seasons, respectively, and Tayla Damir and Yana Marks who were both 21 years old when they won the first and seventh seasons, respectively. The oldest winners are Mercedes Knox who was 28 years old when he won the sixth season, and Anna McEvoy and Em Miguel Leigh were 27 years old when they won the second and sixth seasons, respectively.

== Key legend ==
Key

Winner
Runner-up
Third place
Dumped
Walked
Contestant entered for the second time
Contestant previously appeared or played on another version of the show

== Islanders ==
Name	Age	Hometown	Occupation	Season	Status	Ref.
Grant Crapp	22	Canberra	Electrician	1	Winner	
Tayla Damir	21	Perth	Beauty Queen	1	Winner	
Eden Dally	25	Sydney	Prison Officer	1	Runner-up	
Erin Barnett	23	Melbourne	Nurse	1	Runner-up	
Amelia Plummer	23	Sydney	Nutrition Student	1	Third place	
Josh Moss	25	Sydney	Sports Administrator	1	Third place	
Dom Thomas	26	Sydney	Project Manager	1	Dumped	
Shelby Bilby	25	Gold Coast	Event Management Student	1	Dumped	
Mark O'Dare	26	Sydney	Model	1	Dumped	
Millie Fuller	24	Sydney	Doggy Daycare Worker	1	Dumped	
Edyn "Mac" Mackney	22	Gold Coast	Social Media Manager	1	Dumped	
Teddy Briggs	25	Adelaide	Model	1	Dumped	
Kory Grant	28	Melbourne	Concreter	1	Dumped	
Jaxon Human	24	Melbourne	Stripper/Tennis Coach	1	Dumped	
Françoise Draschler	28	Melbourne	Marketing Executive	1	Dumped	
Cassidy McGill	24	Melbourne	Barmaid	1	Dumped	
Elias Chigros	27	Melbourne	Personal Trainer	1	Dumped	
Justin Lacko	27	Melbourne	International Model	1	Dumped	
Natasha Cherie	24	Perth	Beauty Salon Owner	1	Dumped	
John James Parton	32	Melbourne	DJ	1	Walked	
Kim Hartnett	21	Brisbane	Hairdresser/Bikini Model	1	Dumped	
Charlie Taylor	22	Sydney	International Rugby Player	1	Dumped	
Anna McEvoy	27	Melbourne	Model	2	Winner	
Josh Packham	25	Northern Beaches	Mortgage Broker	2	Winner	
Cartier Surjan	19	Sydney	Lifeguard	2	Runner-up	
Matthew Zukowski	23	Melbourne	Wrestler/Model	2	Runner-up	
Aaron Deacon Shaw	27	Gold Coast	Model/Former Soldier	2	Third place	
Cynthia Taylu	23	Brisbane	Model	2	Third place	
Jessie Wynter	23	Hobart	Waitress	2	Dumped	
Todd Elton	26	Melbourne	Former Australian Football League Player	2	Dumped	
Blake Williamson	28	Gold Coast	Plumber/Personal Trainer	2	Dumped	
Margarita Smith	26	Melbourne	Aged Care Worker	2	Dumped	
Adam Farrugia	27	Gold Coast	Plasterer	2	Dumped	
Isabelle Green	27	Brisbane	Home Carer	2	Dumped	
Luke Packham	25	Northern Beaches	Synthetic Grass Installer	2	Dumped	
Cassie Lansdell	26	Sydney	Executive Assistant	2	Dumped	
Gerard Majda	23	Perth	Personal Trainer	2	Walked	
Biannca Furchtman	25	Sydney	Sales Executive	2	Dumped	
Jordan Cayless	28	Perth	Hairdresser	2	Dumped	
Eoghan Murphy	24	Gold Coast	Real Estate Agent	2	Dumped	
Angel Ellis-Holley	19	Brisbane	Model	2	Dumped	
Tea Frazer	20	Perth	Retail Assistant	2	Dumped	
Maurice Salib	27	Sydney	Media Executive	2	Dumped	
Vanessa Joli	24	Sydney	Business Woman	2	Dumped	
Phoebe Thompson	28	Sydney	Credit Analyst	2	Dumped	
Sam Withers	28	Melbourne	International DJ	2	Dumped	
Mitch Hibberd	25	Melbourne	Footballer	3	Winner	
Tina Provis	25	Sydney	PR Consultant	3	Winner	
Aaron Waters	24	Perth	Model	3	Runner-up	
Jess Velkovski	23	Cronulla	The Intimidator	3	Runner-up	
Chris Graudins	25	Gold Coast	Riot Squad	3	Runner-up	
Zoe Clish	25	Gold Coast	Warehouse Worker	3	Runner-up	
Courtney Stubbs	23	Gold Coast	Nursing Student	3	Dumped	
Noah Hura	23	Perth	Emergency Responder	3	Dumped	
Taku Chimwaza	24	Wollongong	Rugby Player	3	Dumped	
Michela Louis	25	Sydney	Model	3	Dumped	
Hugh Yates	24	Northern Beaches	Carpenter	3	Dumped	
Eliza Kennedy	26	Brisbane	Personal Assistant	3	Dumped	
Jade Ashelford	21	Sunshine Coast	Pharmacy Assistant	3	Dumped	
Lexy Thornberry	20	Brisbane	Bartender and Student	3	Dumped	
Ryan Reid	25	Terrigal	Carpenter	3	Dumped	
Tayla Mellington	26	Gold Coast	Customer Service Representative	3	Dumped	
Ben Giobbi	25	Melbourne	Plumber	3	Dumped	
Aisha Campbell	23	Perth	Nursing Student	3	Dumped	
Audrey Kanongara	21	Brisbane	Model	3	Dumped	
Brent Crapp	25	Central Coast	Recruitment Consultant	3	Dumped	
Brianna Marchant	20	Brisbane	Unknown	3	Dumped	
Nicolas Love	22	Sydney	Luxury Yacht Director	3	Dumped	
Ruby Ennor	25	Gold Coast	Unknown	3	Dumped	
Sadee Sub Luban	22	Sydney	Law Students and Rugby League Player	3	Dumped	
Shayne Tino	27	Melbourne	Fashion Designer	3	Dumped	
Emily Ward	24	Melbourne	Social Media Content Creator	3	Dumped	
Ari Kumar	25	Gold Coast	Web Content Publisher	3	Dumped	
Ronni Krongold	21	Sydney	Personal Trainer	3	Dumped	
Rachael Evren	21	Gold Coast	Pilates Instructor & Social Media Creator	3	Dumped	
Jordan Tilli	28	Melbourne	Business Development Manager	3	Dumped	
Austen Bugeja	22	Sydney	Spray Painter	4	Winner	
Claudia Bonifazio	23	Adelaide	Medical Secretary	4	Winner	
Callum Hole	24	Brisbane	Personal Trainer	4	Runner-up	
Madeline Wilcox	25	Melbourne	Makeup Artist	4	Runner-up	
Mitchell Eliot	25	Sydney	Personal Trainer	4	Runner-up	
Phoebe Spiller	22	Sydney	Fashion Student	4	Runner-up	
Al Perkins	26	Sydney	Influencer	4	Dumped	
Jessica Losurdo	26	Sydney	Risk Analyst	4	Dumped	
Mitch Hibberd	25	Melbourne	Footballer	4	Dumped	
Tina Provis	26	Sydney	Influencer	4	Dumped	
Hugh Wilcox	25	Melbourne	Business Owner	4	Dumped	
Stella Hutcheon	24	Brisbane	Radio Media Coordinator	4	Dumped	
Jordan Dowsett	25	Gold Coast	FIFO Electrician	4	Dumped	
Phoebe Han	22	Brisbane	Deli Worker	4	Dumped	
Tak Chipangura	23	Brisbane	Security Guard	4	Dumped	
Maddy Gillbanks	26	Perth	HR Advisor	4	Dumped	
Jason Shtjefni	25	Adelaide	Day Trader	4	Walked	
Vakoo Kauapirua	27	Sydney	Model	4	Dumped	
Ben Gleeson	25	Sydney	Personal Trainer	4	Dumped	
Layla John	20	Melbourne	Student	4	Dumped	
Conor Howard	26	Sydney	Real Estate Agent	4	Dumped	
Holly Oakes-Ferguson	25	Brisbane	Customer Service Representative	4	Dumped	
Andre Coutinho	24	Perth	Mental Health Support Worker	4	Dumped	
Kale Roberts	25	Gold Coast	Sales	5	Winner	
Kale Roberts	25	Gold Coast	Sales	5	Dumped	
Tyra Johannes	23	Sunshine Coast	Accountant	5	Winner	
Clint Posselt	28	Sunshine Coast	Engineer	5	Runner-up	
Savannah Badger	26	Adelaide	Law Graduate	5	Runner-up	
Lucinda Strafford	23	Brighton, UK	Influencer	5	Runner-up	
Zac Nunns	25	Melbourne	Student	5	Runner-up	
Chloe Jackson	23	Sydney	Fitness Instructor	5	Dumped	
Reid Polak	26	Gold Coast	Personal Trainer and Model	5	Dumped	
Georgia Murray	21	Penrith	Journalist	5	Dumped	
Nate Page	24	Sydney	Personal Trainer	5	Dumped	
Andy Cosgrove	27	Seattle, U.S.	International Baseball Player	5	Dumped	
Harmony Johnson	23	Sydney	Yoga Instructor	5	Dumped	
Nakia Pires	21	Adelaide	Store Worker	5	Dumped	
Trent Woolman	25	Melbourne	Tower Crane Operator	5	Dumped	
Tasia Hafenstein	24	Brisbane	Club Host	5	Dumped	
Abby Miller	23	Sydney	Makeup Artist	5	Dumped	
Seb Williams	24	Melbourne	Entrepreneur	5	Dumped	
Aidan Knox	29	Sydney	Construction Worker and Model	5	Dumped	
Ryan Craig-Turner	28	Wollongong	Fitter	5	Dumped	
Tia Gregory	24	Canberra	Real Estate	5	Dumped	
Ben Richardson	22	Sydney	Videographer & Content Creator	5	Dumped	
Kirra Schofield	26	Perth	Educator	5	Dumped	
Ollie Lawson	24	Perth	FIFO Mining Electrician	5	Dumped	
Em Miguel Leigh	27	Sydney	Model and Content Creator	6	Winner	
Mercedes Knox	28	Dallas, U.S.	Human Resources	6	Winner	
Eric Gracia	26	Sydney	Personal Trainer	6	Runner-up	
Kaylah Holmes	22	Manly	Bikini Athlete and Online Fitness Coach	6	Runner-up	
Mia Dalkos	23	Adelaide	Dress Hire Business Owner	6	Runner-up	
Niko Fotopoulos	28	Sydney	Builder	6	Runner-up	
Dylan Towolawi	25	Galway	Construction Worker	6	Dumped	
Sophie Mills	22	Queensland	Enrolled Nurse	6	Dumped	
Hannah Steinfeld	24	Melbourne	Nursing Student	6	Re-dumped	
Hannah Steinfeld	24	Melbourne	Nursing Student	6	Dumped	
Taylor Reid	28	Melbourne	Stevedore	6	Dumped	
Mimi Paranihi	25	Sydney	Creative Model	6	Dumped	
Stephane "Steph" Blackos	25	Paris, France	Stevedore	6	Dumped	
Jade Phalen	21	Brisbane	Store Manager	6	Dumped	
Zane Prophet	24	Gold Coast	Civil Construction Worker	6	Dumped	
Krissy Bertone	25	Perth	Makeup Artist	6	Dumped	
Tommy Armour	24	Gold Coast	Electrician	6	Walked	
Sydney Paight	25	Los Angeles, U.S.	Operations Manager	6	Dumped	
Xanthe Wessen	21	Sydney	Property Stylist	6	Dumped	
Indigo Carthew	23	Cairns	Sales Manager	6	Dumped	
Eilisha Purcell	25	Brisbane	Support Worker	6	Dumped	
Kane Godlevsky	23	Gold Coast	Carpenter	6	Dumped	
Kye Lambert	22	Northern Beaches	Carpenter	7	Winner	
Yana Marks	21	Sydney	Plumber	7	Winner	
Jaide Dixon	23	Cromwell, New Zealand	Digital marketing assistant	7	Runner-up	
Jotham Russell	22	Gold Coast	American football player	7	Runner-up	
Ross Weightman	28	Byron Bay	Events and marketing specialist	7	Runner-up	
Sharn O'Brien	26	Adelaide	Dermal therapist	7	Runner-up	
Emma Drake	26	Waiuku, New Zealand	Lash technician	7	Dumped	
Mick Maio	27	Melbourne	Creative director	7	Dumped	
Kodi Jordan	24	Sunshine Coast	Salon manager	7	Dumped	
Dylan Towolawi	26	Galway, Ireland	Construction worker	7	Bribed	
Josh Molloy	24	Ireland	American football player	7	Dumped	
Gabby McCarthy	21	Gold Coast	Influencer and content creator	7	Walked	
Mateo Francisco	26	Sydney	Tradie	7	Dumped	
Tamara Goggin	28	Ballyduff, Ireland	Model	7	Dumped	
Alex Haye	27	Wellington, New Zealand	FIFO electrician	7	Dumped	
Bailey McAsey	29	Gold Coast	Work execution officer – FIFO	7	Dumped	
Boston McCathrion	26	Melbourne	Model	7	Dumped	
Mia Torres	22	Gold Coast	Electrician	7	Dumped	
Connor Deighton	25	Gold Coast	Nurse	7	Walked	
Isabel Vella	26	Sydney	Hair salon owner	7	Dumped	
Lacey Butlin	20	Sydney	Model	7	Dumped	
Cooper Benson	23	Brisbane	Salesman	7	Dumped	
Bailey McGarrell	27	Toronto, Canada	Model	7	Dumped	
Zac Incerti	29	Gold Coast	Olympic swimmer	7	Dumped	
Adonijah Allen	26	Perth	Eletrical trade assistant	8	Participating	
Alyssa Grech	24	Gold Coast	Nurse	8	Participating	
Amanda Boue	26	Sydney	Jeweller and model	8	Participating	
Ava Toulson	24	Perth	Traffic controller	8	Participating	
Heidi Mitchell	24	Windsor	Influencer and media personality	8	Participating	
Jack Wheldon	24	Gold Coast	Tradie trainer	8	Participating	
Jai Rawling	23	Perth	Football coach	8	Participating	
Jared Elbonray	25	Perth	Clothing brand owner	8	Participating	
Jordan Kaho	24	Canberra	Airbnb owner	8	Participating	
Keanu Wainohu	25	Sydney	Tradie	8	Participating	
Kylie Garbourg	22	Sydney	Content creator	8	Participating	
Lachlan "Lachie" Cubis	26	Sydney	Chiropractor	8	Participating	
Mackaela Zipf	25	Gold Coast	Model and influencer	8	Participating	
Natalie "Nat" Maree	23	Gold Coast	Airline ground crew	8	Participating	
Oliver "Oli" Spitteler	26	Perth	Personal trainer	8	Participating	
Phoebe Jamieson	23	Adelaide/London, UK	Funemployed	8	Participating	
Reiss McMahon	27	Glasgow, UK	Model and builder	8	Participating	
Samantha "Sammi" Poole	23	Whangārei, New Zealand	Model and content creator	8	Participating	
Layla Wilson	22	Canberra	Pilates instructor	8	Dumped	
Merizel "Zel" dos Santos	28	Gold Coast	Model	8	Dumped	
Shawnee Schien	27	Gold Coast	Online fitness coach	8	Dumped	
Jarrar Haidar	22	Wollongong	Diesel fitter	8	Dumped	

== Post filming ==
Islanders	Season	Still together?	Status	Ref
Grant Crapp; Tayla Damir	1	No	Crapp and Damir split shortly after leaving the villa in 2018.	
Eden Dally; Erin Barnett	1	No	Dally and Barnett split in September 2018.	
Amelia Plummer; Josh Moss	1	No	Plummer and Moss split in May 2022.	
Dom Thomas; Shelby Bilby	1	No	Thomas and Bilby split in August 2018.	
Mark O'Dare; Millie Fuller	1	No	O'Dare and Fuller split in March 2019.	
Dom Thomas; Tayla Damir	1	No	Thomas and Dami begin dating after their respective splits from Bilby and Crapp, but split in June 2019.	
Anna McEvoy; Josh Packham	2	No	McEvoy and Packham split in November 2020.	
Cartier Surjan; Matthew Zukowski	2	No	Surjan and Zukowski split in November 2019.	
Aaron Deacon Shaw; Cynthia Taylu	2	No	Deacon Shaw and Taylu split shortly after leaving the villa in 2019.	
Jessie Wynter; Todd Elton	2	No	Wynter and Elton split in February 2020.	
Blake Williamson; Margarita Smith	2	No	Williamson and Smith split shortly after leaving the villa in 2019.	
Mitch Hibberd; Tina Provis	3	No	Hibberd and Provis split in March 2022 before getting back together on season four. They split for good shortly after leaving the villa.	
Aaron Waters; Jess Velkovski	3	No	Waters and Velkovski split shortly after leaving the villa in 2021.	
Chris Graudins; Zoe Clish	3	No	Graudins and Clish split in December 2021.	
Courtney Stubbs; Noah Hura	3	No	Stubbs and Hura split shortly after leaving the villa in 2021.	
Taku Chimwaza; Michela Louis	3	No	Chimwaza and Louis split shortly after leaving the villa in 2021.	
Ryan Reid; Tayla Mellington	3	No	Reid and Mellington split shortly after leaving the villa in 2021.	
Chris Graudins; Lexy Thornberry	3	No	Graudins began dating Thornberry after his split from Clish, but they split in May 2022.	
Austen Bugeja; Claudia Bonifazio	4	Yes	Bugeja and Bonifazio are still together as of July 2026.	
Callum Hole; Madeline Wilcox	4	No	Hole and Wilcox split shortly after leaving the villa in 2022.	
Mitchell Eliot; Phoebe Spiller	4	No	Eliot and Spiller split in July 2024.	
Al Perkins; Jessica Losurdo	4	No	Perkins and Losurdo split shortly after leaving the villa in 2022.	
Kale Roberts; Tyra Johannes	5	Yes	Roberts and Johannes are still together as of November 2026. Their first child was born in September 2026.	
Clint Posselt; Savannah Badger	5	No	Posselt and Badger split in 2023.	
Lucinda Strafford; Zac Nunns	5	No	Strafford and Nunns split in February 2024.	
Chloe Jackson; Reid Polak	5	No	Jackson and Polak split in 2023.	
Georgia Murray; Nate Page	5	Yes	Murray and Page split in 2024, but eventually got back together. They are still dating as of November 2026.	
Em Miguel Leigh; Mercedes Knox	6	No	Miguel Leigh and Knox split shortly after leaving the villa in 2024.	
Eric Gracia; Kaylah Holmes	6	Yes	Garcia and Holmes are still together as of November 2026.	
Mia Dalkos; Niko Fotopoulos	6	No	Dalkos and Fotopoulos split shortly after leaving the villa in 2024.	
Dylan Towolawi; Sophie Mills	6	No	Towolawi and Mills split shortly after leaving the villa in 2024.	
Hannah Steinfeld; Taylor Reid	6	No	Steinfeld and Reid split shortly after leaving the villa in 2024.	
Mimi Paranihi; Steph Blackos	6	No	Paranihi and Blackos split after leaving the villa in 2024.	
Kye Lambert; Yana Marks	7	Yes	Lambert and Marks are still together as of November 2026.	
Ross Weightman; Sharn O'Brien	7	No	Weightman and O'Brien are split in February 2026.	
Jaide Dixon; Jotham Russell	7	No	Dixon and Russell split shortly after leaving the villa in 2025.	
Emma Drake; Mick Maio	7	No	Drake and Maio split shortly after leaving the villa in 2025.	
Connor Deighton; Isabel Vella	7	Yes	Deighton and Vella got engaged in November 2026.	
