= Love Island Australia season 8 =

2026 season of Australian reality television series

Love Island Australia
- Season 8
- Presented by: Sophie Monk
- No. of episodes: 12

Release
- Original network: 9Now
- Original release: 26 October 2026 – present

Season chronology
- ← Previous; Season 7

The eighth season of Love Island Australia is set to premiere on 9Now on 26 October 2026 and be presented by Sophie Monk and narrated by Eoghan McDermott.

== Format ==
Love Island Australia involves a group of contestants, known as "Islanders", living in a villa in Fiji looking to find love. To remain in the competition, the Islanders must be coupled up with another Islander, as the winning couple wins $50,000. On the first day, the Islanders couple up for the first time based on first impressions. However, throughout the series they may choose to "re-couple" and couple up with another Islander instead. Islanders may join the villa at several stages throughout the season.

Islanders who are single after each re-coupling risk being eliminated and "dumped" from the island. Islanders can also be eliminated via public vote, or through other means such as deciding among themselves who to vote off the island. During the finale, the public vote for a couple they want to win the series and the $50,000 prize. One person from the winning couple can then either split the money with their partner or keep it for themselves.

== Contestants ==
The first 14 islanders were announced on 8 October 2026. This season features Samantha "Sammi" Poole, who represented Miss New Zealand International 2024 and competed on series 16 of Celebrity Treasure Island and Jordan Kaho who is the son of the former Prime Minister of Tonga, Sialeʻataongo Tuʻivakanō.

Name	Age	Hometown	Occupation	Entered	Exited	Status	Ref
Adonijah Allen	26	Perth	Eletrical trade assistant		TBA	Participating	
Alyssa Grech	24	Gold Coast	Nurse	Day 10	TBA	Participating	
Amanda Boue	26	Sydney	Jeweller and model	Day 1	TBA	Participating	
Ava Toulson	24	Perth	Traffic controller	Day 1	TBA	Participating	
Heidi Mitchell	24	Windsor	Influencer and media personality		TBA	Participating	
Jack Wheldon	24	Gold Coast	Tradie trainer	Day 1	TBA	Participating	
Jai Rawling	23	Perth	Football coach		TBA	Participating	
Jared Elbonray	25	Perth	Clothing brand owner	Day 8	TBA	Participating	
Jordan Kaho	24	Canberra	Airbnb owner	Day 3	TBA	Participating	
Keanu Wainohu	25	Sydney	Tradie	Day 1	TBA	Participating	
Kylie Garbourg	22	Sydney	Content creator	Day 10	TBA	Participating	
Lachlan "Lachie" Cubis	26	Sydney	Chiropractor	Day 1	TBA	Participating	
Mackaela Zipf	25	Gold Coast	Model and influencer		TBA	Participating	
Natalie "Nat" Maree	23	Gold Coast	Airline ground crew	Day 1	TBA	Participating	
Oliver "Oli" Spitteler	26	Perth	Personal trainer	Day 1	TBA	Participating	
Phoebe Jamieson	23	Adelaide/London, UK	Unemployed	Day 1	TBA	Participating	
Reiss McMahon	27	Glasgow, UK	Model and builder	Day 11	TBA	Participating	
Samantha "Sammi" Poole	23	Whangārei, New Zealand	Model and content creator	Day 5	TBA	Participating	
Layla Wilson	22	Canberra	Pilates instructor	Day 1	Day 11	Dumped	
Merizel "Zel" dos Santos	28	Gold Coast	Model	Day 3	Day 9	Dumped	
Shawnee Schein	27	Gold Coast	Online fitness coach	Day 1	Day 6	Dumped	
Jarrar Haidar	22	Wollongong	Diesel fitter	Day 1	Day 3	Dumped	

== Coupling and elimination history ==
	Week 1				Week 2			Week 3	Week 4
	Day 1	Day 2	Day 3	Day 6	Day 9		Day 11		
Adonijah	Not in Villa								
Alyssa	Not in Villa						Jared		
Amanda	Keanu	Single	Oli	Jordan		Safe	Jordan		
Ava	Not in Villa	Keanu				Jordan to save	Keanu		
Heidi	Not in Villa								
Jack	Nat			Nat		Safe	Sammi		
Jai	Not in Villa								
Jared	Not in Villa				Layla	Safe	Alyssa		
Jordan	Not in Villa		Layla	Amanda		Vulnerable	Amanda		
Keanu	Amanda	Ava				Safe	Ava		
Kylie	Not in Villa						Lachie		
Lachie	Shawnee			Sammi		Safe	Kylie		
Mackaela	Not in Villa								
Nat	Jack			Jack		Jordan to save	Reiss		
Oli	Layla		Amanda	Phoebe		Jordan to dump	Phoebe		
Phoebe	Jarrar		Zel	Oli		Jordan to dump	Oli		
Reiss	Not in Villa						Nat		
Sammi	Not in Villa			Lachie		Jordan to save	Jack		
Layla	Oli		Jordan	Zel	Jared	Safe	Single	Dumped (Day 11)	
Zel	Not in Villa		Phoebe	Layla	Single	Vulnerable	Dumped (Day 9)		
Shawnee	Lachie			Single	Dumped (Day 6)				
Jarrar	Phoebe		Single	Dumped (Day 3)					
Notes	(Note: On Day 1, after the girls entered the villa, Sophie Monk revealed that the girls could kiss the boys and the boy choose one girl to couple up with.)	(Note: On Day 2, bombshell Ava had to couple up. She chose Keanu, leaving Amanda single.)	(Note: On Day 3, bombshells Jordan and Zel had to couple up. Jordan chose Layla, leaving Oli single and Zel chose Phoebe, leaving Jarrar single. However, Amanda, the only single girl, received the first Power Move, allowing her to couple up from the single boys. She chose Oli.)	(Note: On Day 6, bombshell Sammi had to couple up. She chose Lachie. Then the boys were the ones to pick to couple up.)	(Note: On Day 9, bombshell Jared had to couple up. He chose Layla. Phoebe & Oli received a Power Move to choose a boy who is least likely to find love in the villa. They chose Jordan. Jordan and Zel were vulnerable. Ava, Nat and Sammi had to decide which of the vulnerable boys to save.)				
Dumped	No; Dumping		Jarrar; Failed to couple up	Shawnee; Failed to couple up	Zel; Ava, Nat and Sammi's choice to dump		Layla; Failed to couple up		
Ref									

== Weekly summary ==
The main events in the Love Island AUS villa are summarized in the table below.

Week 1	Entrances	On Day 1, Amanda, Jack, Jarrar, Keanu, Lachie, Layla, Nat, Oli, Phoebe, and Shawnee entered the villa. Ava entered the villa as a bombshell later than evening.; On Day 3, Jordan and Zel entered the villa.; On Day 5, Sammi entered the villa.
Week 1	Coupling	On Day 1, the islanders coupled up for the first time with the boys choosing which girl they would like to couple up with. Jack chose Nat, Keanu chose Shawnee before Lachie stole her from him, Jarrar picked Phoebe, and Oli picked Layla. As Keanu and Amanda were the only single islanders remaining, this left them in a couple.; On Day 2, Ava had to choose one boy to couple up with. She picked Keanu, leaving Amanda single.; On Day 3, Jordan and Zel had to couple up with a girl. Jordan picked Layla, leaving Oli single, while Zel chose Phoebe, leaving Jarrar single. Since Amanda was the only single girl, she received the first Power Move from Yana and Kye. She chose Oli, leaving Jarrar single and dumped.; On Day 6, the islanders recoupled for the first time. As the newest arrival, Sammi was got to choose first. She chose Lachie. Ava and Keanu, and Jack and Nat remained together, whilst Jordan chose Amanda, Zel coupled up with Layla, and Oli picked Phoebe. As Shawnee was not picked, she was left single and dumped from the island.
Week 1	Challenges	On Day 1, the islanders took part in a game in which Sophie asked the girls to hold up a kiss or a clock paddle for each of the guys. Each guy would get to kiss the girl who held up the kiss paddle for them.; On Day 2, the islanders took part in a challenge where they would read a fact off that belonged to one of the islanders of the opposite gender. They would then have to pick which islander the fact belonged to and lock in their answer by kissing them.; On Day 4, the islanders had to pick out a paper from a bowl, read out the task on it, and complete what it said.; On Day 5, all the boys had the choice to kiss Sammi while they were blindfolded and had headphones on. All of the boys chose to do so.; On Day 7, the islanders took part in "Power Trip" where each couple shared a joke before individually carrying a meal tray down a slip-and-slide. At the end, they collected their baggage which had a question about their couple, and had to guess how many of the Power Couples agreed with the question.
Week 1	Dates	On Day 1, Ava went on dates with Jack and Lachie after entering the villa.; On Day 4, Jordan and Zel were giving a Power Move from Austen and Claudia to go on two dates each. Jordan went on a date with Layla and Shawnee, while Zel went on a date with Phoebe and Amanda.; On Day 5, Sammi got to choose one of the boys to take on a date. She chose Jack.
Week 1	Exits	On Day 3, Jarrar was dumped from the island after failing to couple up.; On Day 6, Shawnee was dumped from the villa after failing to couple up.
Week 2	Entrances	On Day 8, Jared entered the villa.; On Day 10, Alyssa and Kylie entered the villa.; On Day 11, Reiss entered the villa.
Week 2	Coupling	On Day 9, Jared got to choose which girl he would like to couple up with. He chose Layla, leaving Zel single. While on their date, Oli and Phoebe received a Power Move from Kaylah and Eric and had to choose which boy was least likely to find love in villa. They chose Jordan, leaving him and Zel vulnerable. Ava, Nat, and Sammi had to choose which boy to save. All three of them chose to save Jordan, leaving Zel dumped.; On Day 11, Alyssa and Kylie got to couple up. Kylie chose Lachie, and Alyssa picked Jared, leaving Sammi and Layla single and vulnerable. The boys not picked were then given the opportunity to couple up with either of them and leave their current couple. Jack stood up for Sammi, leaving them to couple up, resulting in Nat being single and vulnerable. No other boy chose to couple up with Layla or Nat, leaving Reiss to pick one of them. After five minute speed dates with both, Reiss coupled up with Nat, leaving Layla dumped.
Week 2	Challenges	On Day 8, all of the girls got to kiss Jared before he decided who was the best kisser. He picked Layla as the third best, Phoebe in second place, and Ava as the "Kissing Queen".; On Day 10, Alyssa and Kylie got to ask the boys a question and whichever boy they thought gave the best answer, they would kiss them. While doing this, the rest of the girls were in another villa watching this happen on a screen.
Week 2	Dates	On Day 8, Amanda and Nat received a Power Move from Isabel and Connor where they each got to go on a date with Jared.; On Day 9, the Power Couples chose Oli and Phoebe to go on a date.; On Day 11, Reiss went on five minute speed dates with Layla and Nat.
Week 2	Exits	On Day 9, Zel was dumped from the villa after Ava, Nat, and Sammi chose to dump him.; On Day 11, Layla was dumped from the villa after failing to couple up.

== Power couples ==
Unlike previous seasons, "Power Couples" replaced the "Superfans" to influence the results in the villa. The six power couples are season four winners Austen Bugeja and Claudia Bonifazio, season five winners Kale Roberts and Tyra Johannes, season five couple Georgia Murray and Nate Page, season six runner-up Eric Gracia & Kaylah Holmes, season seven winners Kye Lambert & Yana Marks, and season seven couple Connor Deighton and Isabel Vella.

== Episodes ==
Week	Episode	Original release date		Day(s)
1	1	26 October 2026	Monday	Day 1
1	2	27 October 2026	Tuesday	Days 1–2
1	3	28 October 2026	Wednesday	Days 2–3
1	4	29 October 2026	Thursday	Day 3
2	5	2 November 2026	Monday	Days 3–4
2	6	3 November 2026	Tuesday	Days 4–5
2	7	4 November 2026	Wednesday	Day 5
2	8	5 November 2026	Thursday	Days 5–6
3	9	9 November 2026	Monday	Day 6
3	10	10 November 2026	Tuesday	Days 7–8
3	11	11 November 2026	Wednesday	Day 8
3	12	12 November 2026	Thursday	Day 9
4	13	16 November 2026	Monday	Days 9–10
4	14	17 November 2026	Tuesday	Days 10–11
4	15	18 November 2026	Wednesday	Day 11
4	16	19 November 2026	Thursday	Days 11–12
5	17	23 November 2026	Monday	
5	18	24 November 2026	Tuesday	
5	19	25 November 2026	Wednesday	
5	20	26 November 2026	Thursday	
6	21	30 November 2026	Monday	
6	22	1 December 2026	Tuesday	
6	23	2 December 2026	Wednesday	
6	24	3 December 2026	Thursday	
7	25	7 December 2026	Monday	
7	26	8 December 2026	Tuesday	
7	27	9 December 2026	Wednesday	
7	28	10 December 2026	Thursday	
8	29	14 December 2026	Monday	
