= Love Island Australia season 7 =

2025 season of Australian reality television series

Love Island Australia
- Season 7
- Hosted by: Sophie Monk
- No. of days: 25
- No. of contestants: 24
- Winners: Kye Lambert & Yana Marks
- Runners-up: Jaide Dixon & Jotham Russell; Ross Weightman & Sharn O'Brien
- Companion show: Love Island Australia: Officially Unpacked
- No. of episodes: 29

Release
- Original network: 9Now
- Original release: 27 October – 15 December 2025

Season chronology
- ← Previous; Season 6 Next → Season 8

The seventh season of Love Island Australia premiered on 9Now, 27 October 2025 presented by Sophie Monk and narrated by Eoghan McDermott.

== Format ==
Love Island Australia involves a group of contestants, known as "Islanders", living in a villa in Mallorca looking to find love. To remain in the competition, the Islanders must be coupled up with another Islander, as the winning couple wins $50,000. On the first day, the Islanders couple up for the first time based on first impressions. However, throughout the series they may choose to "re-couple" and couple up with another Islander instead. Islanders may join the villa at several stages throughout the season.

Islanders who are single after each re-coupling risk being eliminated and "dumped" from the island. Islanders can also be eliminated via public vote, or through other means such as deciding among themselves who to vote off the island. During the finale, the public vote for a couple they want to win the series and the $50,000 prize. One person from the winning couple can then either split the money with their partner or keep it for themselves.

== Contestants ==
The first 12 islanders were announced on 13 October 2025, two weeks before the premiere. The season featured returning contestant Dylan Towolawi, who previously appeared in the sixth season.

Name	Age	Hometown	Occupation	Entered	Exited	Status	Ref
Kye Lambert	22	Northern Beaches	Carpenter	Day 4	Day 25	Winner	
Yana Marks	21	Sydney	Plumber	Day 1	Day 25	Winner	
Jaide Dixon	23	Cromwell, New Zealand	Digital marketing assistant	Day 15	Day 25	Runner-up	
Jotham Russell	22	Gold Coast	American football player	Day 1	Day 25	Runner-up	
Ross Weightman	28	Byron Bay	Events and marketing specialist	Day 1	Day 25	Runner-up	
Sharn O'Brien	26	Adelaide	Dermal therapist	Day 1	Day 25	Runner-up	
Emma Drake	26	Waiuku, New Zealand	Lash technician	Day 15	Day 23	Dumped	
Mick Maio	27	Melbourne	Creative director	Day 2	Day 23	Dumped	
Kodi Jordan	24	Sunshine Coast	Salon manager	Day 20	Day 23	Dumped	
Dylan Towolawi	26	Galway, Ireland	Construction worker	Day 16	Day 23	Bribed	
Josh Molloy	24	Ireland	American football player	Day 20	Day 22	Dumped	
Gabby McCarthy	21	Gold Coast	Influencer and content creator	Day 1	Day 22	Walked	
Mateo Francisco	26	Sydney	Tradie	Day 6	Day 21	Dumped	
Tamara Goggin	28	Ballyduff, Ireland	Model	Day 6	Day 21	Dumped	
Alex Haye	27	Wellington, New Zealand	FIFO electrician	Day 10	Day 18	Dumped	
Bailey McAsey	29	Gold Coast	Work execution officer – FIFO	Day 16	Day 18	Dumped	
Boston McCathrion	26	Melbourne	Model	Day 10	Day 18	Dumped	
Mia Torres	22	Gold Coast	Electrician	Day 10	Day 18	Dumped	
Connor Deighton	25	Gold Coast	Nurse	Day 1	Day 14	Walked	
Isabel Vella	26	Sydney	Hair salon owner	Day 1	Day 14	Dumped	
Lacey Butlin	20	Sydney	Model	Day 1	Day 9	Dumped	
Cooper Benson	23	Brisbane	Salesman	Day 1	Day 7	Dumped	
Bailey McGarrell	27	Toronto, Canada	Model	Day 1	Day 3	Dumped	
Zac Incerti	29	Gold Coast	Olympic swimmer	Day 1	Day 3	Dumped	

== Coupling and elimination history ==
	Week 1					Week 2			Week 3			Week 4		Final
	Day 1	Day 3		Day 5	Day 7	Day 9	Day 12	Day 14	Day 17	Day 18	Day 21	Day 22	Day 23	Day 25
Kye	Not in Villa			Lacey	Yana	Safe	Yana	Safe	Yana	Yana			Safe	Winners (Day 25)
Yana	Cooper	Mick	Immune	Mick	Kye	Vulnerable	Kye	Safe	Kye	Kye			Safe	Winners (Day 25)
Jaide	Not in Villa								Jotham	Jotham			Safe	Runners-up (Day 25)
Jotham	Lacey	Gabby	Immune	Gabby	Gabby	Yana to dump	Gabby	Safe	Jaide	Jaide			Safe	Runners-up (Day 25)
Ross	Sharn		Vulnerable	Sharn	Sharn	Lacey to dump	Boston	Safe	Boston	Sharn			Safe	Runners-up (Day 25)
Sharn	Ross		Vulnerable	Ross	Ross	Safe	Alex	Safe	Alex	Ross			Safe	Runners-up (Day 25)
Emma	Not in Villa								Single	Mick			Vulnerable	Dumped (Day 23)
Mick	Not in Villa	Yana	Immune	Yana	Tamara	Safe	Mia	Safe	Single	Emma			Vulnerable	Dumped (Day 23)
Kodi	Not in Villa										Dylan		Single	Dumped (Day 23)
Dylan	Not in Villa								Single	Gabby	Kodi		Bribed (Day 23)	
Josh	Not in Villa										Gabby	Single	Dumped (Day 22)	
Gabby	Not in Villa	Jotham	Immune	Jotham	Jotham	Vulnerable	Jotham	Safe	Single	Dylan	Josh	Walked (Day 22)		
Mateo	Not in Villa				Lacey	Lacey to dump	Tamara	Safe	Tamara	Tamara		Dumped (Day 21)		
Tamara	Not in Villa				Mick	Safe	Mateo	Safe	Mateo	Mateo		Dumped (Day 21)		
Alex	Not in Villa						Sharn	Safe	Sharn	Single	Dumped (Day 18)			
Bailey McA.	Not in Villa								Mia	Single	Dumped (Day 18)			
Boston	Not in Villa						Ross	Safe	Ross	Single	Dumped (Day 18)			
Mia	Not in Villa						Mick	Safe	Bailey McA.	Single	Dumped (Day 18)			
Connor	Isabel		Vulnerable	Isabel	Isabel	Safe	Isabel	Safe	Walked (Day 14)					
Isabel	Connor		Vulnerable	Connor	Connor	Safe	Connor	Vulnerable	Dumped (Day 14)					
Lacey	Jotham	Single	Vulnerable	Kye	Mateo	Vulnerable	Dumped (Day 9)							
Cooper	Yana	Single	Vulnerable	Single		Dumped (Day 7)								
Bailey McG.	Zac		Vulnerable	Dumped (Day 3)										
Zac	Bailey McG.		Vulnerable	Dumped (Day 3)										
Notes	(Note: On Day 1, after all the islanders entered the villa, Sophie Monk revealed that the sin of Greed would give the girls the power to kiss the boys and choose one boy to couple up with.)	(Note: On Day 3, bombshells Gabby and Mick had to couple up. Gabby chose Jotham, leaving Lacey single and Mick chose Yana, leaving Cooper single.)	(Note: On Day 3, islanders who were not chosen by the bombshells were declared vulnerable. The vulnerable girls then had to pick one of the vulnerable boys they believed was least likely to find love in the villa, and the vulnerable boys had to do the same for one girl. Zac and Bailey McG were chosen respectively.)	(Note: On Day 5, Kye chose a girl to couple up with. He chose to couple up with Lacey, leaving Cooper single.)	(Note: On Day 7, bombshells Mateo and Tamara had to couple up. Then the girls were the ones to pick to couple up.)	(Note: On Day 9, the Superfans voted for the boy most likely to find love. Jotham, Mateo, and Ross received the most votes and had to decide which of the vulnerable girls to dump. Meanwhile, the Superfans also voted for the girl most likely to find love, and Gabby, Lacey, and Yana received the fewest votes and were vulnerable.)	(Note: On Day 12, bombshells Alex, Boston and Mia had to couple up. Singles Mateo and Tamara chose to couple up with each other.)	(Note: On Day 14, the Superfans voted for their favorite boy and girl. Isabel received the least votes and was dumped.) (Note: Connor decided to voluntarily leave with Isabel.)	(Note: Jotham, Kye, Mia, and Yana checked into Hotel Amor with the new bombshells, where they had to decide whether to stick with their current partners or switch.)	(Note: On Day 18, villa veterans Gabby, Jotham, Mick, Ross, Sharn and Yana had the first opportunity to couple up. Then the villa veterans had to save a bombshell to give them the opportunity to couple up. They chose Tamara.)	(Note: Mateo and Tamara failed to build a connection and were not chosen by the final two bombshells. Therefore, they were dumped from the villa.)	(Note: On Day 22, the Islanders had to vote for the couple they believed had the least chance of continuing their connection outside the villa. However, Gabby chose to leave voluntarily, and with Gabby gone, Josh was left single and was subsequently dumped from the villa.)	(Note: On Day 23, Dylan chose money over love and left with $20,000, which was taken from the Prize Fund. Kodi was left single and was dumped from the villa.) (Note: The couple with the least votes from the Superfans were dumped from the villa.)	(Note: Unlike previous votes, which were decided by the Superfans, Australia voted for the winner.)
Walked	none							Connor	none			Gabby	Dylan; Bribed ($20,000)	none
Dumped	No; Dumping		Zac; Girls' choice to dump	No; Dumping	Cooper; Failed to couple up	Lacey; Jotham, Mateo, and Ross' choice to dump	No; Dumping	Isabel; Superfans' choice to dump	No; Dumping	Alex; Bailey McA. Boston; Mia; Failed to couple up	Mateo; Tamara; Failed to build a connection	Josh; Left single	Kodi; Left single	Jaide & Jotham; Ross & Sharn; Least votes to win
Dumped	No; Dumping		Bailey McG. Boys' choice to dump	No; Dumping	Cooper; Failed to couple up	Lacey; Jotham, Mateo, and Ross' choice to dump	No; Dumping	Isabel; Superfans' choice to dump	No; Dumping	Alex; Bailey McA. Boston; Mia; Failed to couple up	Mateo; Tamara; Failed to build a connection	Josh; Left single	Emma & Mick; Superfans' choice to dump	Kye & Yana; Most votes to win
Ref	none			none			none		none					

== Weekly summary ==
The main events in the Love Island AUS villa are summarized in the table below.

Week 1	Entrances	On Day 1, Bailey McG., Connor, Cooper, Isabel, Jotham, Lacey, Ross, Sharn, Yana, and Zac entered the villa. Gabby entered as a bombshell that night.; On Day 2, Mick entered the villa.; On Day 4, Kye entered the villa.; On Day 6, Mateo and Tamara entered the villa.
Week 1	Coupling	On Day 1, the girls got to choose which boy they would like to couple up with. Bailey McG. coupled up with Zac, Isabel coupled up with Connor, Lacey chose Jotham, Sharn picked Ross, and Yana went with Cooper.; On Day 3, new islanders Gabby and Mick had the chance to couple up with one of the islanders. Gabby picked Jotham, and Mick picked Yana, leaving Lacey and Cooper single and vulnerable. All other islanders were also declared vulnerable.; On Day 5, Kye got to choose one girl to couple up with. He picked Lacey.; On Day 7, Mateo and Tamara got to choose who to couple up with. Mateo picked Lacey, while Tamara picked Mick. The girls then got to choose who they would like to couple up with. Isabel and Connor, Jotham and Gabby, and Sharn and Ross all remained together, whilst Yana chose to couple up with Kye, leaving Cooper single and dumped from the villa.
Week 1	Challenges	On Day 1, Sophie Monk gave the girls the opportunity to kiss any of the boys they wanted to before coupling up.; On Day 3, the boys and girls competed in teams in the "Ghosted" challenge where the teams took turns digging up a skeleton from a make-shift grave, which would contain a statement about an islander on the opposite team. To make their guess, they had to kiss the islander they thought the statement belonged to. The girls scored the most points and were winners of the challenge.
Week 1	Dates	On Day 2, Mick chose to take Lacey and Yana on dates.; On Day 4, Kye chose to go on a date with Gabby.; On Day 5, Connor and Isabel left the villa to go on their first date.
Week 1	Exits	On Day 3, the islanders not chosen by the bombshells became vulnerable. The vulnerable boys had to pick a vulnerable girl to dump, and the vulnerable girls had to pick a vulnerable girl to dump. They picked Bailey McG. and Zac respectively, leaving them dumped from the island.; On Day 7, Cooper was dumped from the island after failing to couple up.
Week 2	Entrances	On Day 10, Alex, Boston, and Mia entered the villa.
Week 2	Coupling	On Day 12, Alex, Boston, and Mia got to choose an islander to couple up with. Alex picked Sharn, Boston chose Ross, and Mia picked Mick. This left Mateo and Tamara single, and they chose to couple up with each other.
Week 2	Challenges	On Day 8, the boys and girls competed against each other in "Forbidden Fruit" where the couples had to give a seductive performance using props, before guessing what percentage of the Superfans agreed to a specific question. The islander with the closest answer would score a point for their team. The girls scored the most points and were winners of the challenge.; On Day 11, the girls competed against each other in the "Big Lick Energy" kissing challenge where boys were blindfolded and each girl kissed every boy. The boys had to rate the kiss out of ten. Yana received the highest score and was the winner of the challenge.; On Day 13, the boys competed in the "Heart Strips a Beat" challenge where they had to raise the girls' heart rates.
Week 2	Dates	On Day 9, Mick and Tamara left the villa to go on their first date.; On Day 10, the boys got to go on speed dates with Boston and Mia, while the girls went on speed dates with Alex.; On Day 12, Alex, Boston, and Mis were given the opportunity to take two islanders of their choice on a date. Alex picked Gabby and Sharn, Boston chose Mick and Ross, while Mia picked Mick and Jotham.
Week 2	Exits	On Day 9, the Superfans voted for which islanders were more likely to find love. Jotham, Mateo, and Ross received the most votes and had to dump one of the vulnerable girls. As Gabby, Lacey, and Yana received the least amount of votes on the girls’ side. Jotham voted to dump Yana, while Mateo and Ross voted to dump Lacey. Since Lacey received the most votes, she was dumped from the island.; On Day 14, the Superfans had to vote for their favorite boy and girl. As Isabel received the least amount of votes, she was dumped from the villa, causing Connor to voluntarily left the villa.
Week 3	Entrances	On Day 15, Emma and Jaide entered Hotel Amor.; On Day 16, Bailey McA. and Dylan entered Hotel Amor.; On Day 20, Josh and Kodi entered the villa.
Week 3	Coupling	On Day 17, Jotham, Kye, Mia, and Yana were given the choice to either stay with their current partner, or couple up with the bombshell that invited them to Hotel Amor. Kye and Yana both chose to stay together, while Jotham decided to couple up with Jaide, and Mia coupled up with Bailey McA., which left Dylan, Emma, Gabby, and Mick single.; On Day 18, Gabby, Jotham, Mick, Ross, Sharn, and Yana were given priority to recouple due to being in the villa the longest. Jotham and Jaide, and Yana and Kye remained together, whilst Gabby chose Dylan, Mick picked Emma, and Ross and Sharn reunited. The islanders then had to choose one of the islanders to save and give them the chance to couple up. They chose Tamara, who chose to stay coupled up with Mateo. As Alex, Bailey McA., Boston, and Mia failed to couple up, they were dumped from the villa.
Week 3	Challenges	On Day 19, the boys went head-to-head in the "Mr SUBLime" challenge where the boys took turns walking down a runway, before demonstrating a talent. It was then up to the girls to decide on the winner, to which they chose Ross.
Week 3	Dates	On Day 15, the boys went on speed dates with Emma and Jaide. Following the dates, Emma and Jaide got to choose one boy to join them in Hotel Amor. Emma picked Kye, while Jaide chose Jotham.; On Day 16, the girls went on speed dates with Bailey McA. and Dylan. Following the dates, Bailey McA. and Dylan got to choose one boy to join them in Hotel Amor. Bailey McA. picked Mia while Dylan chose Yana.; On Day 20, Josh and Kodi had the opportunity to pick one islander to take on a date. Josh chose Sharn, and Kodi chose Dylan.
Week 3	Exits	On Day 18, Alex, Bailey McA., Boston, and Mia were dumped from the villa after failing to couple up.; On Day 21, Mateo and Tamara failed to build a connection with the new bombshells and were not chosen to couple up with them. As a result, they were dumped from the villa.
Week 4	Dates	On Day 21, Kye and Yana left the villa to go on their first date.
Week 4	Exits	On Day 22, Gabby voluntarily left the villa. As Josh was left single after this, he was dumped; On Day 23, Dylan chose money over love and left the villa with $20,000. Kodi was then dumped upon his leaving. Emma and Mick were also dumped from the villa as they received the least amount of votes from the Superfans.; On Day 25, Kye and Yana were announced as the winners after receiving the most votes, leaving Jaide and Jotham, and Ross and Sharn as the runners-up.

== Episodes ==
Week	Episode	Original release date		Day(s)
1	1	27 October 2025	Monday	Day 1
1	2	28 October 2025	Tuesday	Days 1–2
1	3	29 October 2025	Wednesday	Days 2–3
1	4	30 October 2025	Thursday	Day 3
2	5	3 November 2025	Monday	Day 4
2	6	4 November 2025	Tuesday	Day 4
2	7	5 November 2025	Wednesday	Days 4–5
2	8	6 November 2025	Thursday	Days 5–6
3	9	10 November 2025	Monday	Day 7
3	10	11 November 2025	Tuesday	Days 7–8
3	11	12 November 2025	Wednesday	Days 8–9
3	12	13 November 2025	Thursday	Days 9–10
4	13	17 November 2025	Monday	Day 10
4	14	18 November 2025	Tuesday	Day 11
4	15	19 November 2025	Wednesday	Days 11–12
4	16	20 November 2025	Thursday	Days 12–13
5	17	24 November 2025	Monday	Days 13–14
5	18	25 November 2025	Tuesday	Days 14–15
5	19	26 November 2025	Wednesday	Days 15–16
5	20	27 November 2025	Thursday	Days 16–17
6	21	1 December 2025	Monday	Day 17
6	22	2 December 2025	Tuesday	Day 18
6	23	3 December 2025	Wednesday	Days 18–19
6	24	4 December 2025	Thursday	Day 19
7	25	8 December 2025	Monday	Days 19–20
7	26	9 December 2025	Tuesday	Days 20–21
7	27	10 December 2025	Wednesday	Days 21–22
7	28	11 December 2025	Thursday	Day 23
8	29	15 December 2025	Monday	Days 24–25

== Love Island Australia: Officially Unpacked ==
Love Island Australia: Officially Unpacked is the official podcast that spills every secret, replays every jaw-drop, and rehashes every moment that’s got the group chat absolutely buzzing. Hosted by Eoghan McDermott, the voice of Love Island Australia, each episode dives deep into the drama, the romance, the recouplings (and the recouplings after that one), and features catch-ups with Islanders and surprise guests who’ve lived and loved it all.

Week	Episode	Original release date		Guest(s)	Islander(s)
1	1	30 October 2025	Thursday	Sophie Monk; Em Miguel Leigh (season 6)	Bailey McGarrell
2	Bonus	3 November 2025	Monday	—N/a	Zac Incerti
2	2	6 November 2025	Thursday	Austen Bugeja & Claudia Bonifazio (season 4); Alex Mavroidakis (Creative Director) & Josie Steele (Executive Producer)	—N/a
3	3	13 November 2025	Thursday	Callum Hole (season 4)	Lacey Butlin
4	4	20 November 2025	Thursday	—N/a	Mick Maio and Yana Marks
5	5	24 November 2025	Monday	—N/a	Connor Deighton and Isabel Vella
5	6	27 November 2025	Thursday	Caroline Johnson (Executive Producer)	Emma Drake and Jotham Russell
6	7	1 December 2025	Monday	—N/a	Gabby McCarthy, Yana Marks and Jaide Dixon
6	8	4 December 2025	Thursday	—N/a	Ross Weightman, Sharn O'Brien and Boston McCathrion
7	9	11 December 2025	Thursday	—N/a	Mick Maio, Tamara Goggin and Mateo Francisco
8	10	17 December 2025	Wednesday	Jaide Dixon, Kye Lambert, Ross Weightman, Sharn O'Brien and Yana Marks	
