= Love Island Australia =

Australian dating reality series

- Genre: Reality
- Created by: ITV Studios
- Based on: Love Island
- Presented by: Sophie Monk
- Starring: Love Island Australia contestants
- Narrated by: Eoghan McDermott; Stephen Mullan
- Country of origin: Australia
- Original language: English
- No. of seasons: 8
- No. of episodes: 203

Production
- Executive producers: Alex Mavroidakis (ITV Studios); Tina Diaz (Nine Network); Majella Wiemers (ITV Studios); Jaala Webster (ITV Studios)
- Production locations: Mallorca, Spain (2018, 2022–2025); Fiji (2019, 2026-); Byron Bay (2021)
- Running time: 60 minutes
- Production company: ITV Studios Australia

Original release
- Network: 9Go!
- Release: 27 May – 5 July 2018
- Network: Nine Network
- Release: 7 October 2019 – 14 November 2021
- Network: 9Now
- Release: 31 October 2022 – present

Related
- Love Island franchise

Love Island Australia is an Australian dating reality show based on the international Love Island franchise. Following the premise of other versions of the Love Island format, the show features a group of single contestants, known as "islanders" who live together in a luxury villa that is isolated from the outside world, in an attempt to find love.

The show was created by ITV Studios and produced by ITV Studios Australia. The series is presented by Sophie Monk with Eoghan McDermott narrating every season except season 3. Stephen Mullan filled in for Eoghan in 2021.

== Format ==
Love Island involves a group of contestants, referred to as Islanders, living in isolation from the outside world in a villa, and constantly under video surveillance. They are allowed to use phones provided by the producers for the sole reason of receiving texts from producers, alerting them of upcoming dates and activities, and taking pictures.

On the first day, the Islanders couple up for the first time based on first impressions, but over the duration of the series, they are forced to "re-couple" where they can choose to remain in their current couple or swap and change. It is common for Islanders to strategically choose their partner not based on love but as a pact for the two to stay on the island as long as possible, waiting for their ideal match. Islanders recouple at multiple points of the show, and any Islander who remains single after the coupling is eliminated and dumped from the island. Islanders can also be eliminated via public vote, as during the series the Australian public will be instructed to vote through the Love Island app available on smartphones for their favorite islanders, or who they think is the most compatible. Couples who receive the fewest votes risk being eliminated. Additionally, at points in the series, the dumpings (where islanders are forced to leave the island) will be determined by the Islanders, as they are forced to vote one of their own off the island. To survive in the villa the Islanders must be coupled up with another Islander, whether it be for love, friendship, survival or money. During the final week, the public vote for which couple they want to win the series and therefore take home $50,000.

== Production ==
=== Broadcast ===
Love Island Australia averaged around 200,000 viewers for its linear broadcasts in overnight OzTAM ratings, increasing to an average of 511,000 when adding viewers from Nine's streaming service, 9Now. The series performed strongest in the youngest key demographic band (16 to 39 year olds), but ranked low amongst total viewers.

=== Mallorca, Spain ===
Like the UK version, during season one, the Islanders lived in a villa located in Mallorca, Spain. It includes open-plan living, with one large bedroom for the Islanders to sleep. However, there are also day beds outside if un-coupled partners chose to sleep together, and also a Hideaway bedroom for couples to spend the night away from the others as a reward. The villa also comes with a pool, hot tub and all important fire pit. Every moment is captured by one of the 65 cameras and 55 microphones. For season 4, production returned to this villa after a two season break shot at different locations and has stayed there since.

=== Fiji ===
Season two was filmed in Fiji, which is closer to Australia. It is reported that the move was made so new cast members could be added at short notice, meaning plenty of twists and turns for fans.

=== Byron Bay ===
Season three was initially to be filmed in Port Douglas, in Far North Queensland. However, due to border restrictions during the COVID-19 pandemic in Australia, filming was relocated to Northern New South Wales in late-August 2021.

== Series overview ==
Season	Islanders	Days	Location	Host	Episodes	Originally released			Winners	Runner-up(s)	Average viewers (millions)
Season	Islanders	Days	Location	Host	Episodes	First released	Last released	Network	Winners	Runner-up(s)	Average viewers (millions)
1	22	39	Mallorca, Spain	Sophie Monk	30	27 May 2018	5 July 2018	9Go!	Grant Crapp & Tayla Damir	Eden Dally & Erin Barnett	0.17
2	24	36	Fiji	Sophie Monk	29	7 October 2019	14 November 2019	Nine Network	Anna McEvoy & Josh Packham	Cartier Surjan & Matthew Zukowski	0.28
3	30	45	Byron Bay	Sophie Monk	27	11 October 2021	24 November 2021	Nine Network	Mitch Hibberd & Tina Provis	Aaron Waters & Jess Velkovski; Chris Graudins & Zoe Clish	—N/a
4	23	30	Mallorca, Spain	Sophie Monk	29	31 October 2022	20 December 2022	9Now	Austen Bugeja & Claudia Bonifazio	Mitchell Elliot & Phoebe Spiller; Callum Hole & Madeline Wilcox	—N/a
5	23	29	Mallorca, Spain	Sophie Monk	29	30 October 2023	18 December 2023	9Now	Kale Roberts & Tyra Johannes	Clint Posselt & Savannah Badger; Lucinda Strafford & Zac Nunns	—N/a
6	21	25	Mallorca, Spain	Sophie Monk	29	28 October 2024	16 December 2024	9Now	Em Miguel Leigh & Mercedes Knox	Eric Gracia & Kaylah Holmes; Mia Dalkos & Niko Fotopoulos	—N/a
7	24	25	Mallorca, Spain	Sophie Monk	29	27 October 2025	15 December 2025	9Now	Kye Lambert & Yana Marks	Jaide Dixon & Jotham Russell; Ross Weightman & Sharn O'Brien	—N/a
8	TBA	TBA	Fiji	Sophie Monk	TBA	26 October 2026	TBA	9Now	TBA	TBA	—N/a

== See also ==
- Big Brother
- I'm a Celebrity...Get Me Out of Here!
- Love Island (franchise)
