= Love Island Australia season 2 =

2019 season of the reality television series

Love Island Australia
- Season 2
- Hosted by: Sophie Monk
- No. of days: 36
- No. of contestants: 24
- Winners: Anna McEvoy; Josh Packham
- Runners-up: Cartier Surjan; Matthew Zukowski
- No. of episodes: 29

Release
- Original network: Nine Network
- Original release: 7 October – 14 November 2019

Season chronology
- ← Previous; Season 1 Next → Season 3

The second season of Love Island Australia premiered on the Nine Network and 9Now on Monday, 7 October 2019 presented by Sophie Monk and narrated by Eoghan McDermott.

== Format ==
Love Island involves a group of contestants, referred to as Islanders (in the show) living in isolation from the outside world in a villa in Fiji, constantly under video surveillance. To survive in the villa the Islanders must be coupled up with another Islander, whether it be for love, friendship or money, as the overall winning couple receives $50,000. On the first day, the Islanders couple up for the first time based on first impressions, but over the duration of the series, they are forced to "re-couple" where they can choose to remain in their current couple or swap and change.

Any Islander who remains single after the coupling is eliminated and dumped from the island. Islanders can also be eliminated via public vote, as during the series the public vote through the Love Island app available on smartphones for their favourite couple, or who they think is the most compatible. Couples who receive the fewest votes risk being eliminated. Often a twist has occurred where it has been up to the Islanders to vote one of their own off the island. During the final week, the public vote for which couple they want to win the series and therefore take home $50,000. The winners can pick between share the money ($25,000 each) or take it all depending on an envelope they open as seen in love island Australia series 1.

== Islanders ==
The first Islanders were announced on 29 September 2019, one week before the premiere episode.

Name	Age	Hometown	Occupation	Entered	Exited	Status
Anna McEvoy	27	Melbourne	Model	Day 4	Day 36	Winner
Josh Packham	25	Northern Beaches	Mortgage Broker	Day 8	Day 36	Winner
Cartier Surjan	19	Sydney	Lifeguard	Day 1	Day 36	Runner-up
Matthew Zukowski	23	Melbourne	Wrestler/Model	Day 1	Day 36	Runner-up
Aaron Deacon Shaw	27	Gold Coast	Model/Former Soldier	Day 17	Day 36	Third place
Cynthia Taylu	23	Brisbane	Model	Day 1	Day 36	Third place
Jessie Wynter	23	Hobart	Waitress	Day 1	Day 30	Dumped
Todd Elton	26	Melbourne	Former Australian Football League Player	Day 21	Day 30	Dumped
Blake Williamson	28	Gold Coast	Plumber/Personal Trainer	Day 21	Day 29	Dumped
Margarita Smith	26	Melbourne	Aged Care Worker	Day 25	Day 29	Dumped
Adam Farrugia	27	Gold Coast	Plasterer	Day 1	Day 27	Dumped
Isabelle Green	27	Brisbane	Home Carer	Day 15	Day 26	Dumped
Luke Packham	25	Northern Beaches	Synthetic Grass Installer	Day 8	Day 26	Dumped
Cassie Lansdell	26	Sydney	Executive Assistant	Day 1	Day 26	Dumped
Gerard Majda	23	Perth	Personal Trainer	Day 1	Day 22	Walked
Biannca Furchtman	25	Sydney	Sales Executive	Day 15	Day 20	Dumped
Jordan Cayless	28	Perth	Hairdresser	Day 15	Day 20	Dumped
Eoghan Murphy	24	Gold Coast	Real Estate Agent	Day 2	Day 19	Dumped
Angel Ellis-Holley	19	Brisbane	Model	Day 15	Day 17	Dumped
Tea Frazer	20	Perth	Retail Assistant	Day 15	Day 17	Dumped
Maurice Salib	27	Sydney	Media Executive	Day 1	Day 14	Dumped
Vanessa Joli	24	Sydney	Business Woman	Day 1	Day 14	Dumped
Phoebe Thompson	28	Sydney	Credit Analyst	Day 4	Day 11	Dumped
Sam Withers	28	Melbourne	International DJ	Day 1	Day 7	Dumped

== Coupling and elimination history ==
	Week 1		Week 2		Week 3						Week 4			Week 5			
	Day 1	Day 3	Day 7	Day 11	Day 14	Day 17		Day 19	Day 20	Day 22	Day 26			Day 27	Day 29	Day 30	Day 36
Anna	Not in Villa		Gerard	Josh	Immune	Josh	Immune	Josh	Immune	Josh		Safe	Immune	Josh	Blake & Margarita to dump	Safe	Winners (Day 36)
Josh	Not in Villa			Anna	Immune	Anna	Immune	Anna	Immune	Anna		Safe	Immune	Anna	Blake & Margarita to dump	Safe	Winners (Day 36)
Cartier	Gerard		Adam		Immune	Adam	Immune	Adam	Immune	Adam		Safe	Immune	Matthew	Blake & Margarita to dump	Safe	Runners-up (Day 36)
Matthew	Vanessa		Vanessa		Single	Isabelle	Immune	Single	Isabelle to couple up	Single		Immune	Vulnerable	Cartier	Blake & Margarita to dump	Safe	Runners-up (Day 36)
Aaron	Not in Villa						Biannca & Jessie to save	Cynthia	Immune	Cynthia		Safe	Immune	Cynthia	Blake & Margarita to dump	Safe	Third Place (Day 36)
Cynthia	Sam		Maurice		Gerard	Gerard	Immune	Aaron	Immune	Aaron		Safe	Immune	Aaron	Blake & Margarita to dump	Safe	Third Place (Day 36)
Jessie	Maurice	Eoghan	Eoghan		Vulnerable	Single	Vulnerable	Gerard	Immune	Todd		Safe	Immune	Todd	Vulnerable	Eliminated	Dumped (Day 30)
Todd	Not in Villa									Jessie		Safe	Immune	Jessie	Vulnerable	Eliminated	Dumped (Day 30)
Blake	Not in Villa									Isabelle	Margarita	Immune	Immune	Margarita	Vulnerable	Dumped (Day 29)	
Margarita	Not in Villa										Blake	Immune	Immune	Blake	Vulnerable	Dumped (Day 29)	
Adam	Cassie		Cartier		Immune	Cartier	Immune	Cartier	Immune	Cartier		Safe	Immune	Single	Dumped (Day 27)		
Isabelle	Not in Villa					Matthew	Immune	Eoghan to dump	Vulnerable	Blake	Single	Immune	Vulnerable	Dumped (Day 26)			
Cassie	Adam		Phoebe	Luke	Immune	Luke	Immune	Luke	Immune	Luke		Eliminated	Dumped (Day 26)				
Luke	Not in Villa			Cassie	Immune	Cassie	Immune	Cassie	Immune	Cassie		Eliminated	Dumped (Day 26)				
Gerard	Cartier		Anna	Single	Cynthia	Cynthia	Immune	Jessie	Immune	Single	Walked (Day 22)						
Biannca	Not in Villa					Single	Vulnerable	Eoghan to dump	Vulnerable	Dumped (Day 20)							
Jordan	Not in Villa					Eoghan	Immune	Eoghan to dump	Vulnerable	Dumped (Day 20)							
Eoghan	Not in Villa	Jessie	Jessie		Vulnerable	Jordan	Immune	Single	Dumped (Day 19)								
Angel	Not in Villa					Single	Vulnerable	Dumped (Day 17)									
Tea	Not in Villa					Single	Vulnerable	Dumped (Day 17)									
Maurice	Jessie	Single	Cynthia		Vulnerable	Dumped (Day 14)											
Vanessa	Matthew		Matthew		Vulnerable	Dumped (Day 14)											
Phoebe	Not in Villa		Cassie	Single	Dumped (Day 11)												
Sam	Cynthia		Single	Dumped (Day 7)													
Notes	1		2	none							3			none			
Walked	none									Gerard	none						
Dumped	No; Dumping		Sam; Failed to couple up	Phoebe; Islander's choice to dump	Maurice; Girl's choice to dump	No; Dumping	Angel; Tea; Aaron's choice to dump	Eoghan; Bombsquad's choice to dump	Biannca; Jordan; Matthew's choice to dump	No; Dumping		Cassie & Luke; Australia's choice to dump	Isabelle; 1 of 3 votes to dump	Adam; Failed to couple up	Blake & Margarita; 3 of 3 votes to dump	Jessie & Todd; Australia's choice to dump	Aaron & Cynthia; Third–most votes to win
Dumped	No; Dumping		Sam; Failed to couple up	Phoebe; Islander's choice to dump	Maurice; Girl's choice to dump	No; Dumping	Angel; Tea; Aaron's choice to dump	Eoghan; Bombsquad's choice to dump	Biannca; Jordan; Matthew's choice to dump	No; Dumping		Cassie & Luke; Australia's choice to dump	Isabelle; 1 of 3 votes to dump	Adam; Failed to couple up	Blake & Margarita; 3 of 3 votes to dump	Jessie & Todd; Australia's choice to dump	Matthew & Cartier; Second–most votes to win
Dumped	No; Dumping		Sam; Failed to couple up	Phoebe; Islander's choice to dump	Vanessa; Boy's choice to dump	No; Dumping	Angel; Tea; Aaron's choice to dump	Eoghan; Bombsquad's choice to dump	Biannca; Jordan; Matthew's choice to dump	No; Dumping		Cassie & Luke; Australia's choice to dump	Isabelle; 1 of 3 votes to dump	Adam; Failed to couple up	Blake & Margarita; 3 of 3 votes to dump	Jessie & Todd; Australia's choice to dump	Matthew & Cartier; Second–most votes to win
Dumped	No; Dumping		Sam; Failed to couple up	Phoebe; Islander's choice to dump	Vanessa; Boy's choice to dump	No; Dumping	Angel; Tea; Aaron's choice to dump	Eoghan; Bombsquad's choice to dump	Biannca; Jordan; Matthew's choice to dump	No; Dumping		Cassie & Luke; Australia's choice to dump	Isabelle; 1 of 3 votes to dump	Adam; Failed to couple up	Blake & Margarita; 3 of 3 votes to dump	Jessie & Todd; Australia's choice to dump	Anna & Josh; Most votes to win

Notes

- ^Note 1: Eoghan arrived after the first coupling, and was told he would be able to steal a girl for himself on Day-3. Eoghan chose to couple up with Jessie, leaving Maurice single. All other Day-1 couples remained the same.
- ^Note 2: On Day-7, there was a recoupling ceremony. As new Islanders, Anna and Phoebe got to pick their partner first, with a boy's choice recoupling intended to follow. As Phoebe chose Cassie, there were then more single guys than single girls. Hence the planned boy's recoupling was replaced with a girl's choice recoupling.
- ^Note 3: On Day-26 a Triple Dumping occurred. Firstly, as new Islander Margarita was able steal a boy for herself. She coupled up with Blake, making Isabelle single. Then, one couple was dumped from the island based on Australia's vote. As a newly formed couple, Margirita and Blake were immune to being dumped. Cassie and Luke received the fewest votes from Australia and were dumped. Then, Sophie revealed that one single islander (Isabelle or Matthew) will be dumped by an Islander vote. Each couple cast one vote and voting would be by open vote. The couples voted to save Matthew and dump Isabelle.
- ^Note 4: Day-31's recoupling ceremony was the final recoupling. From this point forward, the couples are set and one of the final five couples will win Love Island.

== Series details ==
=== Weekly summary ===
The main events in the Love Island villa are summarised in the table below.

Week 1	Entrances	On Day 1, Adam, Cartier, Cassie, Cynthia, Gerard, Jessie, Matthew, Maurice, Sam and Vanessa entered the villa.; On Day 2, Eoghan entered the villa.; On Day 4, Anna and Phoebe entered the villa.
Week 1	Coupling	On Day 1, the Islanders couple up for the first time. After all of the girls entered, the boys were asked to choose a girl to pair up with. Jessie coupled up with Maurice. Cartier paired up with Gerard, Vanessa with Matthew, Cassie and Adam coupled up, whilst Cynthia coupled with Sam.; On Day 3, Eoghan chose to couple up with Jessie, leaving Maurice single.
Week 1	Dates	On Day 3, Eoghan went on dates with Jessie and Cartier prior to the coupling ceremony.; On Day 4, Eoghan went on dates with Anna and Phoebe, and Adam went on dates with Anna and Phoebe.

== Australia’s Vote ==
Throughout the series, Australia was given the opportunity to vote to affect the islanders. This included voting for islanders to go on a date, voting to save or dump islanders from the island, and ultimately for the winner of Love Island Australia.

Ep.	Date given	Question	Options	Australia's Decision	Result
2	8 October 2019	Which guy would you like to date Anna?	Adam, Eoghan, Gerard, Matthew, Maurice, Sam	Australia voted Adam on a date with Anna. After the date, Anna had the choice of another boy for a date.	Her choice was Eoghan.
2	8 October 2019	Which guy would you like to date Phoebe?	Adam, Eoghan, Gerard, Matthew, Maurice, Sam	Australia voted Adam on a date with Phoebe. After the date, Phoebe had the choice of another boy for a date.	Her choice was Eoghan.

== Ratings ==
=== Ratings ===
Week	Episode	Air date	Timeslot	Overnight ratings		Consolidated ratings		Total ratings		Source
Week	Episode	Air date	Timeslot	Viewers	Rank	Viewers	Rank	Viewers	Rank	Source
1	1	7 October 2019	Monday 8:45pm	456,000	20	62,000	6	518,000	18	
1	2	8 October 2019	Tuesday 8:40pm	355,000	19	63,000	5	417,000	19	
1	3	9 October 2019	Wednesday 8:40pm	285,000	20	80,000	5	365,000	18	
1	4	10 October 2019	Thursday 8:40pm	237,000	19	76,000	5	313,000	16f	
1	5	11 October 2019	Friday 8:40pm	Outside the top 20	–	–	–	–	–	
2	6	14 October 2019	Monday	348,000	–	70,000	–	418,000	20	
2	7	15 October 2019	Tuesday	287,000	–	62,000	–	349,000	20	
2	8	16 October 2019	Wednesday	299,000	–	75,000	–	374,000	19	
2	9	17 October 2019	Thursday	225,000	–	89,000	–	314,000	19	
2	10	18 October 2019	Friday	179,000	–	100,000	–	278,000	19	
3	11	21 October 2019	Monday	Outside the top 20	–	–	–	–	–	
3	12	22 October 2019	Tuesday	328,000	17	55,000	–	376,000	17	
3	13	23 October 2019	Wednesday	288,000	–	70,000	–	358,000	20	
3	14	24 October 2019	Thursday	298,000	19	67,000	–	364,000	17	
3	15	27 October 2019	Sunday (9GO!)	161,000	2	–	–	–	–	
4	16	28 October 2019	Monday	327,000	–	43,000	–	370,000	20	
4	17	29 October 2019	Tuesday	309,000	19	55,000	–	356,000	17	
4	18	30 October 2019	Wednesday	320,000	19	55,000	–	360,000	20	
4	19	31 October 2019	Thursday	281,000	20	60,000	–	343,000	17	
4	20	3 November 2019	Sunday (9GO!)	171,000	2	–	–	–	–	
5	21	4 November 2019	Monday	353,000	20	65,000	–	400,000	20	
5	22	5 November 2019	Tuesday	Outside the top 20	–	–	–	–	–	
5	23	6 November 2019	Wednesday	Outside the top 20	–	–	–	–	–	
5	24	7 November 2019	Thursday	223,000	–	57,000	–	280,000	20	
5	25	10 November 2019	Sunday (9GO!)	129,000	10	–	–	–	–	
6	26	11 November 2019	Monday	Outside the top 20	–	–	–	–	–	
6	27	12 November 2019	Tuesday	Outside the top 20	–	–	–	–	–	
6	28	13 November 2019	Wednesday	Outside the top 20	–	–	–	–	–	
6	29	14 November 2019	Thursday	302,000	20	–	–	–	–	
