= Love Island Australia season 3 =

2021 season of the reality television series

Love Island Australia
- Season 3
- Hosted by: Sophie Monk
- No. of days: 45
- No. of contestants: 30
- Winners: Mitch Hibberd & Tina Provis
- Runners-up: Aaron Waters & Jess Velkovski; Chris Graudins & Zoe Clish
- No. of episodes: 27

Release
- Original network: Nine Network
- Original release: 11 October – 24 November 2021

Season chronology
- ← Previous; Season 2 Next → Season 4

The third season of Love Island Australia premiered on the Nine Network and 9Now on Monday, 11 October 2021 presented by Sophie Monk and narrated by Stephen Mullan.

== Format ==
Love Island involves a group of contestants, referred to as Islanders (in the show) living in isolation from the outside world in a villa in Byron Bay, constantly under video surveillance. To survive in the villa the Islanders must be coupled up with another Islander, whether it be for love, friendship or money, as the overall winning couple receives $50,000. On the first day, the Islanders couple up for the first time based on first impressions, but over the duration of the series, they are forced to "re-couple" where they can choose to remain in their current couple or swap and change.

Any Islander who remains single after the coupling is eliminated and dumped from the island. Islanders can also be eliminated via public vote, as during the series the public vote through the Love Island app available on smartphones for their favourite islanders (as singles or couples), or who they think is the most compatible. Those with the fewest votes risk being eliminated. Occasionally, Islanders themselves will vote off each other off the island. During the final week, the public vote for which couple they want to win the series and therefore take home $50,000. The winners can pick between share the money ($25,000 each) or take it all depending on an envelope they open as seen in previous seasons.

== Islanders ==
The first Islanders were announced on the socials, one week before the premiere episode.

Name	Age	Hometown	Occupation	Entered	Exited	Status
Mitch Hibberd	25	Melbourne	Footballer	Day 3	Day 45	Winner
Tina Provis	25	Sydney	PR Consultant	Day 1	Day 45	Winner
Aaron Waters	24	Perth	Model	Day 1	Day 45	Runner-up
Jess Velkovski	23	Cronulla	The intimidator	Day 1	Day 45	Runner-up
Chris Graudins	25	Gold Coast	Riot squad	Day 3	Day 45	Runner-up
Zoe Clish	25	Gold Coast	Warehouse Worker	Day 14	Day 45	Runner-up
Courtney Stubbs	23	Gold Coast	Nursing student	Day 1	Day 43	Dumped
Noah Hura	23	Perth	Emergency responder	Day 23	Day 43	Dumped
Taku Chimwaza	24	Wollongong	Rugby player	Day 1	Day 41	Dumped
Michela Louis	25	Sydney	Model	Day 21	Day 41	Dumped
Hugh Yates	24	Northern Beaches	Carpenter	Day 30	Day 41	Dumped
Eliza Kennedy	26	Brisbane	Personal Assistant	Day 35	Day 41	Dumped
Jade Ashelford	21	Sunshine Coast	Pharmacy Assistant	Day 35	Day 39	Dumped
Lexy Thornberry	20	Brisbane	Bartender / Student	Day 2	Day 39	Dumped
Ryan Reid	25	Terrigal	Carpenter	Day 1	Day 35	Dumped
Tayla Mellington	26	Gold Coast	Customer service representative	Day 21	Day 35	Dumped
Ben Giobbi	25	Melbourne	Plumber	Day 23	Day 30	Dumped
Aisha Campbell	23	Perth	Nursing student	Day 21	Day 26	Dumped
Audrey Kanongara	21	Brisbane	Model	Day 21	Day 26	Dumped
Brent Crapp	25	Central Coast	Recruitment consultant	Day 23	Day 26	Dumped
Brianna Marchant	20	Brisbane	N/A	Day 21	Day 26	Dumped
Nicolas Love	22	Sydney	Luxury Yacht Director	Day 14	Day 26	Dumped
Ruby Ennor	25	Gold Coast	N/A	Day 21	Day 26	Dumped
Sadee Sub Luban	22	Sydney	Law Student, Rugby league player	Day 23	Day 26	Dumped
Shayne Tino	27	Melbourne	Fashion designer	Day 23	Day 26	Dumped
Emily Ward	24	Melbourne	Social media content creator	Day 8	Day 17	Dumped
Ari Kumar	25	Gold Coast	Web content publisher	Day 1	Day 16	Dumped
Ronni Krongold	21	Sydney	Personal trainer	Day 1	Day 16	Dumped
Rachael Evren	21	Gold Coast	Pilates Instructor & Social Media Creator	Day 1	Day 10	Dumped
Jordan Tilli	28	Melbourne	Business development manager	Day 1	Day 5	Dumped

=== Future appearances ===
Mitch Hibberd and Tina Provis returned for season four.

Hibberd and Provis appeared on season one of Love Island Games.

In 2022, Audrey Kanongara competed on The Challenge: Australia.

== Coupling and elimination history ==
	Week 1			Week 2		Week 3				Week 4	Week 5		Week 6			Week 7	
	Day 1	Day 3	Day 5	Day 10		Day 15	Day 16	Day 17		Day 26	Day 30	Day 35	Day 36	Day 39	Day 41	Day 43	Finale
Mitch	Not in Villa		Tina	Emily	Safe	Emily	Safe	Tina	Immune	Tina		Taku & Michela to dump	Tina	Tina	Taku & Michela to dump	^{2} Chris & Zoe to stay^{1} Aaron & Jess to stay	Winners (Day 45)
Tina	Ronni		Mitch	Taku	Safe	Taku	Safe	Mitch	Safe	Mitch		Taku & Michela to dump	Mitch	Mitch	Taku & Michela to dump	^{2} Chris & Zoe to stay^{1} Aaron & Jess to stay	Winners (Day 45)
Aaron	Courtney		Ari	Jess	Rachael to dump	Jess	Safe	Jess	Immune	Jess		Noah & Courtney to dump	Eliza	Jess	Hugh & Eliza to dump	^{2} Mitch & Tina to stay^{1} Chris & Zoe to stay	Runners-up (Day 45)
Jess	Jordan		Taku	Aaron	Safe	Aaron	Safe	Aaron	Safe	Aaron		Noah & Courtney to dump	Single	Aaron	Hugh & Eliza to dump	^{2} Mitch & Tina to stay^{1} Chris & Zoe to stay	Runners-up (Day 45)
Chris	Not in Villa		Rachael	Rachael	Rachael to dump	Zoe	Immune	Zoe	Immune	Zoe		Ryan & Tayla to dump	Zoe	Zoe	Vulnerable	^{2} Mitch & Tina to stay^{1} Aaron & Jess to stay	Runners-up (Day 45)
Zoe	Not in Villa					Chris	Immune	Chris	Safe	Chris		Ryan & Tayla to dump	Chris	Chris	Vulnerable	^{2} Mitch & Tina to stay^{1} Aaron & Jess to stay	Runners-up (Day 45)
Courtney	Aaron		Ronni	Single	Immune	Nicolas	Immune	Nicolas	Safe	Noah		Taku & Michela to dump	Single	Noah	Vulnerable	^{2} Mitch & Tina to stay^{1} Chris & Zoe to stay	Dumped (Day 43)
Noah	Not in Villa									Courtney		Taku & Michela to dump	Jade	Courtney	Vulnerable	^{2} Mitch & Tina to stay^{1} Chris & Zoe to stay	Dumped (Day 43)
Taku	Rachael		Jess	Tina	Rachael to dump	Tina	Safe	Emily	Immune	Michela		Ryan & Tayla to dump	Michela	Michela	Vulnerable	Dumped (Day 41)	
Michela	Not in Villa									Taku		Ryan & Tayla to dump	Taku	Taku	Vulnerable	Dumped (Day 41)	
Hugh	Not in Villa										Lexy	Ryan & Tayla to dump	Lexy	Eliza	Vulnerable	Dumped (Day 41)	
Eliza	Not in Villa											Immune	Aaron	Hugh	Vulnerable	Dumped (Day 41)	
Jade	Not in Villa											Immune	Noah	Single	Dumped (Day 39)		
Lexy	Not in Villa	Ryan	Ryan	Ryan	Vulnerable	Ryan	Safe	Ryan	Safe	Ben	Hugh	Ryan & Tayla to dump	Hugh	Single	Dumped (Day 39)		
Ryan	Ari	Lexy	Lexy	Lexy	Safe	Lexy	Safe	Lexy	Immune	Tayla		Hugh & Lexy to dump	Dumped (Day 35)				
Tayla	Not in Villa									Ryan		Hugh & Lexy to dump	Dumped (Day 35)				
Ben	Not in Villa									Lexy	Single	Dumped (Day 30)					
Aisha	Not in Villa									Single	Dumped (Day 26)						
Audrey	Not in Villa									Single	Dumped (Day 26)						
Brent	Not in Villa									Single	Dumped (Day 26)						
Brianna	Not in Villa									Single	Dumped (Day 26)						
Nicolas	Not in Villa					Courtney	Immune	Courtney	Immune	Single	Dumped (Day 26)						
Ruby	Not in Villa									Single	Dumped (Day 26)						
Sadee	Not in Villa									Single	Dumped (Day 26)						
Shayne	Not in Villa									Single	Dumped (Day 26)						
Emily	Not in Villa			Mitch	Safe	Mitch	Safe	Taku	Eliminated	Dumped (Day 17)							
Ari	Ryan	Single	Aaron	Ronni	Safe	Ronni	Eliminated	Dumped (Day 16)									
Ronni	Tina		Courtney	Ari	Safe	Ari	Eliminated	Dumped (Day 16)									
Rachael	Taku		Chris	Chris	Vulnerable	Dumped (Day 10)											
Jordan	Jess		Single	Dumped (Day 5)													
Notes	1		none	2		3	none				4	none					
Walked	none										Aaron	none					
Dumped	No; Dumping		Jordan; Failed to couple up	No; Dumping	Rachael; Aaron, Chris & Taku's choice to dump	No; Dumping	Ari; Boy's choice to dump	No; Dumping	Emily; Australia's choice to dump	Aisha; Audrey; Brianna; Ruby; Failed to couple up	Ben; Failed to couple up	Ryan & Tayla; Islanders' choice to dump	No; Dumping	Jade; Lexy; Failed to couple up	Hugh & Eliza; Taku & Michela; Aaron & Jess, Mitch & Tina's choice to dump	Noah & Courtney; 0 of 12 votes to stay	Aaron & Jess; Chris & Zoe; Least votes to win
Dumped	No; Dumping		Jordan; Failed to couple up	No; Dumping	Rachael; Aaron, Chris & Taku's choice to dump	No; Dumping	Ronni; Girl's choice to dump	No; Dumping	Emily; Australia's choice to dump	Brent; Nicolas; Sadee; Shayne; Failed to couple up	Ben; Failed to couple up	Ryan & Tayla; Islanders' choice to dump	No; Dumping	Jade; Lexy; Failed to couple up	Hugh & Eliza; Taku & Michela; Aaron & Jess, Mitch & Tina's choice to dump	Noah & Courtney; 0 of 12 votes to stay	Mitch & Tina; Most votes to win

- ^Note 1: Lexy arrived after the first coupling, and was told she would be able to steal a boy for herself on Day 3. Lexy chose to couple up with Ryan, leaving Ari single. All other Day 1 couples remained the same.
- ^Note 2: After the re-coupling, Courtney was left single. Based on Australia's vote Aaron, Chris and Taku had the power to dump either Lexy or Rachael. They chose Rachael to dump.
- ^Note 3: As new arrivals, Nicolas and Zoe were able steal a partner for themselves on Day 15. Nicolas chose Courtney, and Zoe chose Chris. All other couples from Day 10's recoupling remained set.
- ^Note 4: Aaron declared that he was leaving the show. The next day he decided to stay.

== Ratings ==
Week	Episode	Air date	Timeslot	Overnight ratings		Source
Week	Episode	Air date	Timeslot	Viewers	Rank	Source
1	1	11 October 2021	Monday	311,000	-	
1	2	12 October 2021	Tuesday	279,000	20	
1	3	13 October 2021	Wednesday	292,000	19	
1	4	14 October 2021	Thursday	173,000	-	
2	5	18 October 2021	Monday	265,000	-	
2	6	19 October 2021	Tuesday	295,000	20	
2	7	20 October 2021	Wednesday	217,000	-	
2	8	21 October 2021	Thursday	168,000	-	
3	9	25 October 2021	Monday	285,000	-	
3	10	26 October 2021	Tuesday	239,000	-	
3	11	27 October 2021	Wednesday	252,000	-	
3	12	28 October 2021	Thursday	133,000	-	
4	13	1 November 2021	Monday	204,000	-	
4	14	2 November 2021	Tuesday	191,000	-	
4	15	3 November 2021	Wednesday	203,000	-	
4	16	4 November 2021	Thursday	148,000	-	
5	17	8 November 2021	Monday	263,000	-	
5	18	9 November 2021	Tuesday	186,000	-	
5	19	10 November 2021	Wednesday	145,000	-	
5	20	11 November 2021	Thursday	152,000	-	
6	21	15 November 2021	Monday	201,000	-	
6	22	16 November 2021	Tuesday	180,000	-	
6	23	17 November 2021	Wednesday	150,000	-	
6	24	18 November 2021	Thursday	164,000	-	
7	25	22 November 2021	Monday	176,000	-	
7	26	23 November 2021	Tuesday	162,000	-	
7	27	24 November 2021	Wednesday	141,000	-	
