= Love Island Australia season 1 =

2018 season of the reality television series

Love Island Australia
- Season 1
- Hosted by: Sophie Monk
- No. of days: 39
- No. of contestants: 22
- Winners: Grant Crapp; Tayla Damir
- Runners-up: Eden Dally; Erin Barnett
- No. of episodes: 30

Release
- Original network: 9Go!
- Original release: 27 May – 5 July 2018

Season chronology
- Next → Season 2

The first season of Love Island Australia began airing on 27 May 2018 9Go! and 9Now presented by Sophie Monk and narrated by Eoghan McDermott. The final aired on 5 July 2018, with Grant Crapp and Tayla Damir winning and sharing the $50,000 prize money. Eden Dally and Erin Barnett finished as runners up.

== Format ==
Love Island involves a group of contestants, referred to as Islanders, living in isolation from the outside world in a villa in Mallorca, Spain, constantly under video surveillance. To survive in the villa the Islanders must be coupled up with another Islander, whether it be for love, friendship or money, as the overall winning couple receives a combined $50,000. On the first day, the Islanders couple up for the first time based on first impressions, but over the duration of the series they are forced to "re-couple" where they can choose to remain in their current couple or swap partners.

Any Islander who remains single after the coupling is eliminated and dumped from the island. Islanders can also be eliminated via public vote, as during the series the public vote through the Love Island app available on smartphones for their favourite couple or prospective couple. Pairs who receive the fewest votes risk being eliminated. Often a twist has occurred where it has been up to the Islanders to vote one of their own off the island. During the final week, the public vote towards which couple they want to win the series and therefore take home $50,000.

== Islanders ==
The Islanders for the first series were released by Nine on 21 May 2018, just one week before the premiere episode.

Islander	Age	Hometown	Occupation	Entered	Exited	Status
Grant Crapp	22	Canberra	Electrician	Day 1	Day 39	Winner
Tayla Damir	21	Perth	Beauty Queen	Day 1	Day 39	Winner
Eden Dally	25	Sydney	Prison Officer	Day 1	Day 39	Runner-up
Erin Barnett	23	Melbourne	Nurse	Day 1	Day 39	Runner-up
Amelia Plummer	23	Sydney	Nutrition Student	Day 23	Day 39	Third place
Josh Moss	25	Sydney	Sports Administrator	Day 1	Day 39	Third place
Dom Thomas	26	Sydney	Project Manager	Day 16	Day 38	Dumped
Shelby Bilby	25	Gold Coast	Event Management Student	Day 23	Day 38	Dumped
Mark O'Dare	26	Sydney	Model	Day 31	Day 37	Dumped
Millie Fuller	24	Sydney	Doggy Daycare Worker	Day 1	Day 37	Dumped
Edyn "Mac" Mackney	22	Gold Coast	Social Media Manager	Day 14	Day 36	Dumped
Teddy Briggs	25	Adelaide	Model	Day 21	Day 36	Dumped
Kory Grant	28	Melbourne	Concreter	Day 31	Day 35	Dumped
Jaxon Human	24	Melbourne	Stripper/Tennis Coach	Day 11	Day 30	Dumped
Françoise Draschler	28	Melbourne	Marketing Executive	Day 8	Day 26	Dumped
Cassidy McGill	24	Melbourne	Barmaid	Day 1	Day 25	Dumped
Elias Chigros	27	Melbourne	Personal Trainer	Day 4	Day 18	Dumped
Justin Lacko	27	Melbourne	International Model	Day 1	Day 18	Dumped
Natasha Cherie	24	Perth	Beauty Salon Owner	Day 1	Day 15	Dumped
John James Parton	32	Melbourne	DJ	Day 4	Day 11	Walked
Kim Hartnett	21	Brisbane	Hairdresser/Bikini Model	Day 2	Day 9	Dumped
Charlie Taylor	22	Sydney	International Rugby Player	Day 1	Day 7	Dumped

=== Future appearances ===
In 2019, Justin Lacko competed on season 5 of I'm a Celebrity...Get Me Out of Here! Kory Grant appeared on season two of True Love Or True Lies?

In 2020, Erin Barnett competed on season 6 of I'm a Celebrity...Get Me Out of Here!

In 2022, Grant Crapp competed on The Challenge: Australia and The Challenge: World Championship.

In 2023, Teddy Briggs competed on season 7 of The Amazing Race Australia.

== Coupling and elimination history ==
	Week 1		Week 2			Week 3			Week 4			Week 5			Week 6				Final
	Day 1	Day 3	Day 7	Day 9	Day 10	Day 15	Day 17	Day 18	Day 22	Day 24	Day 25	Day 26	Day 30	Day 31	Day 35	Day 36	Day 37	Day 38	Final
Grant	Cassidy		Tayla	Immune	Tayla	Tayla		Safe	Cassidy	Tayla	Immune	Tayla	Vulnerable	Tayla	Tayla	Mac & Teddy to dump	Safe	Finalist	Winner (Day 39)
Tayla	Josh	Single	Grant	Vulnerable	Grant	Grant		Immune	Jaxon	Grant	Immune	Grant	Immune	Grant	Grant	Mac & Teddy to dump	Safe	Finalist	Winner (Day 39)
Eden	Erin		Erin	Immune	Erin	Erin		Justin to dump	Erin	Erin	Immune	Erin	Vulnerable	Erin	Erin	Mark & Millie to dump	Safe	Finalist	Runner-up (Day 39)
Erin	Eden		Eden	Vulnerable	Eden	Eden		Justin to dump	Eden	Eden	Immune	Eden	Immune	Eden	Eden	Mark & Millie to dump	Safe	Finalist	Runner-up (Day 39)
Amelia	Not in Villa									Josh	Immune	Josh	Immune	Josh	Josh	Mac & Teddy to dump	Vulnerable	Finalist	Third place (Day 39)
Josh	Tayla	Kim	Natasha	Immune	Natasha	Cassidy	Single	Safe	Françoise	Amelia	Immune	Amelia	Vulnerable	Amelia	Amelia	Mac & Teddy to dump	Vulnerable	Finalist	Third place (Day 39)
Dom	Not in Villa						Cassidy	Immune	Millie	Millie	Immune	Mac	Vulnerable	Single	Shelby	Mark & Millie to dump	Safe	Eliminated	Dumped (Day 38)
Shelby	Not in Villa									Jaxon	Immune	Jaxon	Immune	Single	Dom	Mark & Millie to dump	Safe	Eliminated	Dumped (Day 38)
Mark	Not in Villa													Mac	Millie	Vulnerable	Vulnerable	Dumped (Day 37)	
Millie	Justin		Justin	Vulnerable	Justin	Justin		Immune	Dom	Dom	Immune	Teddy	Immune	Kory	Mark	Vulnerable	Vulnerable	Dumped (Day 37)	
Mac	Not in Villa					Jaxon		Immune	Teddy	Single	Vulnerable	Dom	Immune	Mark	Teddy	Vulnerable	Dumped (Day 36)		
Teddy	Not in Villa								Mac	Françoise	Immune	Millie	Vulnerable	Single	Mac	Vulnerable	Dumped (Day 36)		
Kory	Not in Villa													Millie	Single	Dumped (Day 35)			
Jaxon	Not in Villa					Mac		Vulnerable	Tayla	Shelby	Immune	Shelby	Vulnerable	Dumped (Day 30)					
Françoise	Not in Villa			Immune	Elias	Elias		Immune	Josh	Teddy	Immune	Single	Dumped (Day 26)						
Cassidy	Grant		Elias	Vulnerable	Single	Josh	Dom	Immune	Grant	Single	Vulnerable	Dumped (Day 25)							
Justin	Millie		Millie	Immune	Millie	Millie		Vulnerable	Dumped (Day 18)										
Elias	Not in Villa		Cassidy	Immune	Françoise	Françoise		Eliminated	Dumped (Day 18)										
Natasha	Charlie		Josh	Vulnerable	Josh	Single	Dumped (Day 15)												
John James	Not in Villa		Kim	Immune	Single	Walked (Day 11)													
Kim	Single	Josh	John James	Vulnerable	Dumped (Day 9)														
Charlie	Natasha		Single	Dumped (Day 7)															
Notes	1		none	2	3	none	4	5	none	6		none	7	8	9	10	11	12	13
Walked	none				John James	none													
Dumped	No; Dumping		Charlie; Failed to couple up	Kim; Australia's choice to dump	No; Dumping	Natasha; Failed to couple up	No; Dumping	Elias; Australia's choice to dump	No; Dumping		Cassidy; Australia's choice to dump	Françoise; Failed to couple up	Jaxon; Girls' choice to dump	No; Dumping	Kory; Failed to couple up	Mac & Teddy; Vulnerable Couple's choice to dump	Mark & Millie; Islanders's choice to dump	Dom & Shelby; Australia's choice to dump	Amelia & Josh; Third–most votes to win
Dumped	No; Dumping		Charlie; Failed to couple up	Kim; Australia's choice to dump	No; Dumping	Natasha; Failed to couple up	No; Dumping	Elias; Australia's choice to dump	No; Dumping		Cassidy; Australia's choice to dump	Françoise; Failed to couple up	Jaxon; Girls' choice to dump	No; Dumping	Kory; Failed to couple up	Mac & Teddy; Vulnerable Couple's choice to dump	Mark & Millie; Islanders's choice to dump	Dom & Shelby; Australia's choice to dump	Eden & Erin; Second–most votes to win
Dumped	No; Dumping		Charlie; Failed to couple up	Kim; Australia's choice to dump	No; Dumping	Natasha; Failed to couple up	No; Dumping	Justin; Eden & Erin's choice to dump	No; Dumping		Cassidy; Australia's choice to dump	Françoise; Failed to couple up	Jaxon; Girls' choice to dump	No; Dumping	Kory; Failed to couple up	Mac & Teddy; Vulnerable Couple's choice to dump	Mark & Millie; Islanders's choice to dump	Dom & Shelby; Australia's choice to dump	Eden & Erin; Second–most votes to win
Dumped	No; Dumping		Charlie; Failed to couple up	Kim; Australia's choice to dump	No; Dumping	Natasha; Failed to couple up	No; Dumping	Justin; Eden & Erin's choice to dump	No; Dumping		Cassidy; Australia's choice to dump	Françoise; Failed to couple up	Jaxon; Girls' choice to dump	No; Dumping	Kory; Failed to couple up	Mac & Teddy; Vulnerable Couple's choice to dump	Mark & Millie; Islanders's choice to dump	Dom & Shelby; Australia's choice to dump	Grant & Tayla; Most votes to win

Notes

- ^Note 1: Kim arrived after the first coupling, but was told she would be able to steal a boy for herself on Day 2. She chose Josh, leaving Tayla. All other couples from Day 1's coupling remained set.
- ^Note 2: Australia voted for the girl they hope finds true love in the villa. As a new islander, Françoise was immune from the vote. Kim received the fewest votes and was dumped from the island, leaving John James single.
- ^Note 3: As a new arrival, Françoise was able steal a boy for herself on Day 10. She chose Elias. This left Cassidy single. All other couples from Day 7's recoupling remained set.
- ^Note 4: Dom arrived after the re-coupling ceremony, but was told he would be able to steal a girl for himself on Day 17. He chose Cassidy, leaving Josh single. All other couples from Day 15's recoupling remained set.
- ^Note 5: Australia voted for the boy they believe would leave the villa with a girlfriend. As a new islander, Dom was immune from the vote. Elias received the fewest votes and was dumped from the island, leaving Françoise single. Then Jaxon & Justin were revealed to have the next fewest votes and were vulnerable to be dumped. The power as who between Justin & Jaxon would be dump was held by Eden & Erin - as Eden received the most votes, and Erin was his couple. Erin & Eden chose to dump Justin, leaving Millie single.
- ^Note 6: Amelia and Shelby arrived after the re-coupling on Day 22 and were told they would be able to steal a boy each. Amelia chose Josh and Shelby chose Jaxon. A full re-coupling followed, with Cassidy and Mac left single. Australia voted to save one of the two girls, with Cassidy being dumped after receiving the fewest votes.
- ^Note 7: On Day 30, the Girls were tasked to collectively decide to dump one boy from the island. They dumped Jaxon, leaving Shelby single.
- ^Note 8: Kory and Mark arrived on Day 31, with both being told they can steal one girl each. Kory chose Millie and Mark chose Mac. This left Teddy and Dom single. All other couples from Day 26's recoupling remained set.
- ^Note 9: The Day 35 recoupling ceremony was the final recoupling. From this point forward, the couples are set and one of the final 6 couples will be dumped every night until finale night.
- ^Note 10: Australia voted for their favorite couples. Teddy & Mac and Mark & Millie received the fewest votes and were up for the dump. The saved islanders had to publicly vote to dump one of the vulnerable couples, with each saved couple casting one vote. As the vote resulted in 2–2 tie, with the saved couples were then forced to reach a consensus decision. As a consensus could not be reached, vulnerable couples then had to choose between themselves as to who would be dumped. Mac & Teddy elected to be dumped to save Mark & Millie.
- ^Note 11: Australia voted for their least favorite couples. Amelia & Josh and Mark & Millie received the fewest votes and were vulnerable to be dumped. The safe islanders had to reach a consensus decision to dump either Amelia & Josh and Mark & Millie. The safe couples chose to dump Mark & Millie.
- ^Note 12: Australia voted for the couple they wanted in the Finale of Love Island Australia. Dom & Shelby had the fewest votes and were the final couple dumped from Love Island.
- ^Note 13: Australia voted for which of the final three couples they want to win Love Island Australia. Grant & Tayla received the most votes, were declared the winners of Love Island Australia and forget in the final dilemma - Both received an envelope; one contained $50,000 and the other had nothing. Tayla received the $50,000 and had to decide whether to share the money with Grant or to keep the money for herself. She chose to share the money, so both Grant and Tayla received $25,000.

== Reception ==
Love Island Australia averaged around 200,000 viewers for its linear broadcasts in overnight OzTAM ratings, increasing to an average of 511,000 when adding viewers from Nine's streaming service, 9Now. The series performed strongest in the youngest key demographic band (16 to 39 year olds), but ranked low amongst total viewers. The series generated in excess of 150 million views through its official YouTube channel, however 85% were viewers from outside Australia, and YouTube viewers cannot be monetised.

=== Viewership ===
No.	Title	Air date	Overnight ratings	Ref(s)
No.	Title	Air date	Viewers	Ref(s)
1	Episode 1	27 May 2018	155,000	
2	Episode 2	28 May 2018	184,000	
3	Episode 3	29 May 2018	136,000	
4	Episode 4	30 May 2018	134,000	
5	Episode 5	31 May 2018	154,000	
6	Episode 6	3 June 2018	121,000	
7	Episode 7	4 June 2018	162,000	
8	Episode 8	5 June 2018	157,000	
9	Episode 9	6 June 2018	160,000	
10	Episode 10	7 June 2018	170,000	
11	Episode 11	10 June 2018	164,000	
12	Episode 12	11 June 2018	190,000	
13	Episode 13	12 June 2018	200,000	
14	Episode 14	13 June 2018	214,000	
15	Episode 15	14 June 2018	181,000	
16	Episode 16	17 June 2018	145,000	
17	Episode 17	18 June 2018	195,000	
18	Episode 18	19 June 2018	204,000	
19	Episode 19	20 June 2018	188,000	
20	Episode 20	21 June 2018	194,000	
21	Episode 21	24 June 2018	138,000	
22	Episode 22	25 June 2018	174,000	
23	Episode 23	26 June 2018	185,000	
24	Episode 24	27 June 2018	195,000	
25	Episode 25	28 June 2018	156,000	
26	Episode 26	1 July 2018	151,000	
27	Episode 27	2 July 2018	174,000	
28	Episode 28	3 July 2018	201,000	
29	Episode 29	4 July 2018	185,000	
30	Final	5 July 2018	197,000	
30	Winner Announced	5 July 2018	198,000	
