= Jotham Russell =

Australian American football player (born 2003)

Profile
- Position: Defensive end

Personal information
- Born: 8 June 2003 (age 23); Canberra, Australian Capital Territory, Australia
- Listed height: 6 ft 4 in (1.93 m)
- Listed weight: 239 lb (108 kg)

Career information
- High school: Palm Beach Currumbin (Currumbin, Queensland, Australia)
- NFL draft: 2024: undrafted

Career history
- New England Patriots (2024)*
- * Offseason or practice squad member only
- Stats at Pro Football Reference

Jotham Russell (born 8 June 2003) is an Australian professional American football defensive end. Previously a rugby league player for the Brisbane Broncos, he joined the NFL through the International Player Pathway Program (IPPP) in 2024.

== Early life and rugby career ==
Russell was born on 8 June 2003 in Canberra, Australia. He is of Nigerian descent. He grew up playing multiple sports, including gymnastics, soccer and Little Athletics. At age 10, he moved to the Gold Coast, Queensland and began playing rugby league, after a coach noticed his size and suggested he try out the sport. Playing as a front-rower, he joined the academy for the National Rugby League's Brisbane Broncos as a teenager and later switched to playing wing.

Following two years in the Broncos academy, Russell played for the Currumbin Eagles and later with the Tweed Heads Seagulls U21 squad. He was noted by ZeroTackle.com as having "impressed plenty" with the Seagulls and being able to play both prop and in the backline out wide, where he "regularly found the tryline doing so." He was prepared to sign a contract with the Canberra Raiders in 2023 before receiving an opportunity to play American football.

== Football career ==
Russell had sent National Football League (NFL) scouts film of his rugby highlights while the league was scouting Australia for potential players. Noted for his size, 6 feet 4 inches (1.93 m) and 240 pounds (110 kg), he was considered as having the potential to be a talented pass rusher and received comparisons to players such as Von Miller and Fred Warner. He was invited to tryout for the NFL Australia camp, and after success there, was chosen in January 2024 as one of 16 players for the 2024 International Player Pathway Program (IPPP) class, designed to give foreign players opportunities in the NFL. He was one of two Australians chosen, along with Patrick Murtagh. Russell spent 10 weeks training with other IPPP prospects at IMG Academy in Florida, describing learning American football as being "like learning a new language." To help learn the sport, he brought a PlayStation and downloaded Madden NFL.

Russell was eligible for the 2024 NFL draft along with two other IPPP prospects, but was not selected. Afterwards, he was signed by the New England Patriots on 13 May 2024 as an undrafted free agent, following a successful tryout at the team's rookie minicamp, to play defensive end. He was waived on August 27, and re-signed to the practice squad.

== Personal life ==
On 13 October 2025, Russell was announced as a contestant on the seventh season of Love Island Australia.

== See also ==
- List of players who have converted from one football code to another
