= Love Island Australia season 5 =

2023 season of Australian reality television series

Love Island Australia
- Season 5
- Hosted by: Sophie Monk
- No. of days: 29
- No. of contestants: 23
- Winners: Kale Roberts & Tyra Johannes
- Runners-up: Clint Posselt & Savannah Badger; Lucinda Strafford & Zac Nunns
- No. of episodes: 29

Release
- Original network: 9Now
- Original release: 30 October – 18 December 2023

Season chronology
- ← Previous; Season 4 Next → Season 6

The fifth season of Love Island Australia premiered on 9Now on Monday, 30 October 2023 presented by Sophie Monk and narrated by Eoghan McDermott.

== Format ==
Love Island Australia involves a group of contestants, known as "Islanders", living in a villa in Mallorca looking to find love. To remain in the competition, the Islanders must be coupled up with another Islander, as the winning couple wins $50,000. On the first day, the Islanders couple up for the first time based on first impressions. However, throughout the series they may choose to "re-couple" and couple up with another Islander instead. Islanders may join the villa at several stages throughout the season.

Islanders who are single after each re-coupling risk being eliminated and "dumped" from the island. Islanders can also be eliminated via public vote, or through other means such as deciding among themselves who to vote off the island. During the finale, the public vote for a couple they want to win the series and the $50,000 prize. One person from the winning couple can then either split the money with their partner or keep it for themselves.

Season 5 was pre-recorded in August–September 2023. All previous seasons of the show across the franchise have aired on a short delay, but while filming was still taking place to allow for public votes. An ITV Studios executive producer stated the change in format was so that the season would air during late spring and early summer in the Southern Hemisphere, but be filmed in the Mediterranean when the weather was still warm. A select group of "Love Island Superfans" were given access to live video feeds from the villa to participate in elimination votes, challenge polls, and date selections.

== Islanders ==
The first Islanders were announced on social media, one week before the premiere episode. Of the islanders, Abby Miller has participated on tenth season of The Bachelors, whilst Lucinda Strafford was a contestant on the seventh series of the British version of the show.

Name	Age	Hometown	Occupation	Entered	Exited	Status
Kale Roberts	25	Gold Coast	Sales	Day 16^{1}	Day 29	Winner
Kale Roberts	25	Gold Coast	Sales	Day 4	Day 13	Dumped
Tyra Johannes	23	Sunshine Coast	Accountant	Day 1	Day 29	Winner
Clint Posselt	28	Sunshine Coast	Engineer	Day 21	Day 29	Runner-up
Savannah Badger	26	Adelaide	Law Graduate	Day 1	Day 29	Runner-up
Lucinda Strafford	23	Brighton, United Kingdom	Influencer	Day 2	Day 29	Runner-up
Zac Nunns	25	Melbourne	Student	Day 1	Day 29	Runner-up
Chloe Jackson	23	Sydney	Fitness Instructor	Day 17	Day 28	Dumped
Reid Polak	26	Gold Coast	Personal trainer/Model	Day 3	Day 28	Dumped
Georgia Murray	21	Penrith	Journalist	Day 11	Day 27	Dumped
Nate Page	24	Sydney	Personal Trainer	Day 1	Day 27	Dumped
Andy Cosgrove	27	Seattle, United States	International Baseball Player	Day 13	Day 25	Dumped
Harmony Johnson	23	Sydney	Yoga Instructor	Day 21	Day 25	Dumped
Nakia Pires	21	Adelaide	Store Worker	Day 1	Day 25	Dumped
Trent Woolman	25	Melbourne	Tower Crane Operator	Day 1	Day 22	Dumped
Tasia Hafenstein	24	Brisbane	Club Host	Day 15	Day 19	Dumped
Abby Miller	23	Sydney	Makeup Artist	Day 7	Day 18	Dumped
Seb Williams	24	Melbourne	Entrepreneur	Day 15	Day 18	Dumped
Aidan Knox	29	Sydney	Construction Worker and Model	Day 10	Day 16	Dumped
Ryan Craig-Turner	28	Wollongong	Fitter	Day 10	Day 12	Dumped
Tia Gregory	24	Canberra	Real Estate	Day 1	Day 12	Dumped
Ben Richardson	22	Sydney	Videographer & Content Creator	Day 1	Day 11	Dumped
Kirra Schofield	26	Perth	Educator	Day 1	Day 9	Dumped
Ollie Lawson	24	Perth	FIFO Mining Electrician	Day 1	Day 6	Dumped

- ^Note 1: Dumped Islander Kale re-entered the villa on Day 16.

=== Future appearances ===
Lucinda Strafford competed on season two of Love Island Games. She later returned for series three of Love Island: All Stars.

== Coupling and elimination history ==
	Spicy Era				Vibe Era	Villain Era						Make or Break Era		Loved-up Era			
	Week 1			Week 2					Week 3			Week 4					Final
	Day 1	Day 3	Day 6	Day 9	Day 11	Day 12	Day 13		Day 16	Day 18	Day 19	Day 22		Day 25	Day 27	Day 28	Day 29
Kale	Not in Villa		Nakia	Nakia	Nakia	Tia & Ryan to dump	Single	Dumped (Day 13)	Tyra	Abby to dump	Tyra		Trent to dump	Tyra	Nate & Georgia to dump	Safe	Winners (Day 29)
Tyra	Ben		Ben	Ben	Aidan	Tia & Ryan to dump	Aidan		Kale	Seb to dump	Kale		Trent to dump	Kale	Nate & Georgia to dump	Safe	Winners (Day 29)
Clint	Not in Villa											Savannah	Trent to dump	Savannah	Nate & Georgia to dump	Safe	Runners-up (Day 29)
Savannah	Zac		Trent	Trent	Trent	Safe	Trent		Seb	Vulnerable	Trent	Clint	Trent to dump	Clint	Nate & Georgia to dump	Safe	Runners-up (Day 29)
Lucinda	Not in Villa	Nate	Zac	Zac	Ryan	Vulnerable	Zac		Zac	Seb to dump	Zac		Nakia to dump	Zac	Nate & Georgia to dump	Safe	Runners-up (Day 29)
Zac	Savannah		Lucinda	Lucinda	Tia	Vulnerable	Lucinda		Lucinda	Vulnerable	Lucinda		Nakia to dump	Lucinda	Nate & Georgia to dump	Safe	Runners-up (Day 29)
Chloe	Not in Villa									Reid	Reid		Trent to dump	Reid	Clint & Savannah to dump	Vulnerable	Dumped (Day 28)
Reid	Not in Villa	Tia	Kirra	Abby	Abby	Safe	Abby		Tasia	Immune	Chloe		Trent to dump	Chloe	Clint & Savannah to dump	Vulnerable	Dumped (Day 28)
Georgia	Not in Villa				Nate	Safe	Nate		Nate	Vulnerable	Nate		Trent to dump	Nate	Clint & Savannah to dump	Dumped (Day 27)	
Nate	Nakia	Lucinda	Tia	Tia	Georgia	Safe	Georgia		Georgia	Abby to dump	Georgia		Trent to dump	Georgia	Clint & Savannah to dump	Dumped (Day 27)	
Andy	Not in Villa						Nakia		Nakia	Abby to dump	Nakia	Harmony	Nakia to dump	Single	Dumped (Day 25)		
Harmony	Not in Villa											Andy	Nakia to dump	Single	Dumped (Day 25)		
Nakia	Nate	Waiting; Room	Kale	Kale	Kale	Tia & Ryan to dump	Andy		Andy	Seb to dump	Andy	Single	Vulnerable	Single	Dumped (Day 25)		
Trent	Tia	Waiting; Room	Savannah	Savannah	Savannah	Safe	Savannah		Abby	Vulnerable	Savannah	Single	Vulnerable	Dumped (Day 22)			
Tasia	Not in Villa								Reid	Safe	Single	Dumped (Day 19)					
Abby	Not in Villa			Reid	Reid	Safe	Reid		Trent	Vulnerable	Dumped (Day 18)						
Seb	Not in Villa								Savannah	Vulnerable	Dumped (Day 18)						
Aidan	Not in Villa				Tyra	Tia & Ryan to dump	Tyra		Single	Dumped (Day 16)							
Ryan	Not in Villa				Lucinda	Vulnerable	Dumped (Day 12)										
Tia	Trent	Reid	Nate	Nate	Zac	Vulnerable	Dumped (Day 12)										
Ben	Tyra		Tyra	Tyra	Single	Dumped (Day 11)											
Kirra	Ollie		Reid	Single	Dumped (Day 9)												
Ollie	Kirra		Single	Dumped (Day 6)													
Notes	1	2	none		3	4	5		6, 7	8, 9	10	11		12	13, 14	15	16
Dumped	No; Dumping	Nakia; Trent; Failed to couple up	Ollie; Failed to couple up	Kirra; Failed to couple up	Ben; Failed to couple up	Tia; Ryan; Islanders' choice to dump	Kale; Failed to couple up		Aidan; Failed to couple up	Seb; Girls' choice to dump	Tasia; Failed to couple up	No; Dumping	Trent; Islanders' choice to dump	Harmony; Nakia; Failed to couple up	Nate & Georgia; Islanders' choice to dump	Chloe & Reid; Least votes	Clint & Savannah; Lucinda & Zac; Least votes to win
Dumped	No; Dumping	Nakia; Trent; Failed to couple up	Ollie; Failed to couple up	Kirra; Failed to couple up	Ben; Failed to couple up	Tia; Ryan; Islanders' choice to dump	Kale; Failed to couple up		Aidan; Failed to couple up	Abby; Boys' choice to dump	Tasia; Failed to couple up	No; Dumping	Trent; Islanders' choice to dump	Andy; Andy's choice to remain single	Nate & Georgia; Islanders' choice to dump	Chloe & Reid; Least votes	Kale & Tyra; Most votes to win

=== Notes ===
- ^Note 1: On Day 1, the girls had the power to choose at the first Coupling.
- ^Note 2: On Day 3, Lucinda chose to couple up with Nate, leaving Nakia single. Reid entered the villa and chose to couple up with Tia, leaving Trent single. Nakia and Trent were moved to the Waiting Room. All other Day 1 couples remained the same.
- ^Note 3: On Day 12, Georgia entered the villa after the Re-Coupling, and she was given the opportunity to “speed-date” Nate and Ben. She then made the decision to couple up with Nate, therefore leaving Ben single and dumping him from the villa.
- ^Note 4: The two couples with the least votes from the Superfans were vulnerable and the couples with the most votes had the responsibility to dump one of the vulnerable couples.
- ^Note 5: On Day 13, Andy chose to couple up with Nakia, leaving Kale single and therefore dumped from the villa. All other Day 11 couples remained the same.
- ^Note 6: On Day 16, Kale coupled-up with Tyra during their date and returned to the villa.
- ^Note 7: For this re-coupling, the bombshells, Seb & Tasia, had the first choice.
- ^Note 8: On Day 18, Chloe chose to couple up with Reid, leaving Tasia single.
- ^Note 9: The three boys and three girls with the least votes from the Superfans were Vulnerable, and the three boys and three girls with the most votes had to dump one boy and one girl out of those who were vulnerable.
- ^Note 10: On Day 19, as the only single boy, Trent chose to couple up with Savannah, leaving Tasia single and therefore dumped from the villa. All other Day 16 couples remained the same.
- ^Note 11: On Day 22, Clint chose to couple up with Savannah and Harmony chose to couple up with Andy, leaving Nakia and Trent single and vulnerable. The other couples had to vote to dump either Nakia or Trent.
- ^Note 12: On Day 25, in the final re-coupling, Andy decided not to couple-up and remain single. He, along with Harmony and Nakia who were not chosen by any of the other boys, were dumped as a result.
- ^Note 13: On Day 27, the remaining couples had to choose the least compatible couple to be dumped from the villa.
- ^Note 14: On Day 27, the final four couples had to choose between love or money. If they chose to take the money, they would immediately leave the villa with $20,000, and their partner would be dumped. Nobody took the offer.
- ^Note 15: The couple with the least votes from the Superfans were dumped from the villa.
- ^Note 16: Unlike previous votes, which were decided by the Superfans, Australia voted for the winner.
