= Love Island Australia season 6 =

2024 season of Australian reality television series

Love Island Australia
- Season 6
- Promotional poster for the season
- Hosted by: Sophie Monk
- No. of days: 25
- No. of contestants: 21
- Winners: Em Miguel Leigh & Mercedes Knox
- Runners-up: Eric Gracia & Kaylah Holmes; Mia Dalkos & Niko Fotopoulos
- No. of episodes: 29

Release
- Original network: 9Now
- Original release: 28 October – 16 December 2024

Season chronology
- ← Previous; Season 5 Next → Season 7

The sixth season of Love Island Australia premiered on 9Now, 28 October 2024 presented by Sophie Monk and narrated by Eoghan McDermott.

== Format ==
Love Island Australia involves a group of contestants, known as "Islanders", living in a villa in Mallorca looking to find love. To remain in the competition, the Islanders must be coupled up with another Islander, as the winning couple wins $50,000. On the first day, the Islanders couple up for the first time based on first impressions. However, throughout the series they may choose to "re-couple" and couple up with another Islander instead. Islanders may join the villa at several stages throughout the season.

Islanders who are single after each re-coupling risk being eliminated and "dumped" from the island. Islanders can also be eliminated via public vote, or through other means such as deciding among themselves who to vote off the island. During the finale, the public vote for a couple they want to win the series and the $50,000 prize. One person from the winning couple can then either split the money with their partner or keep it for themselves.

== Islanders ==
The first Islanders were announced on social media on 9 October 2024. This season featured Love Island Gods, which were announced the same day, and were two contestants from previous seasons. The Gods were revealed to be Sydney Paight, who was the runner-up on the fourth series of the American version of the show, and Steph Blackos, who was a contestant on the second series of the French version of the show and spin-off Love Island Games. The Gods were given special powers where they could couple up with whoever they wanted, whenever they wanted without needed a recoupling ceremony. This season also featured Mercedes Knox, who previously won the second and third season of FBoy Island.

Name	Age	Hometown	Occupation	Entered	Exited	Status	Ref
Em Miguel Leigh	27	Sydney	Model and content creator	Day 1	Day 25	Winner	
Mercedes Knox	28	Dallas, United States	Model	Day 10	Day 25	Winner	
Eric Garcia	26	Sydney	Personal trainer	Day 18	Day 25	Runner-up	
Kaylah Holmes	22	Manly	Bikini athlete and online fitness coach	Day 9	Day 25	Runner-up	
Mia Dalkos	23	Adelaide	Dress hire business owner	Day 13	Day 25	Runner-up	
Niko Fotopoulos	28	Sydney	Builder	Day 1	Day 25	Runner-up	
Dylan Towolawi	25	Galway, Ireland	Construction worker	Day 1	Day 24	Dumped	
Sophie Mills	22	Queensland	Enrolled nurse	Day 4	Day 24	Dumped	
Hannah Steinfeld	24	Melbourne	Nursing student	Day 16^{1}	Day 24	Re-dumped	
Hannah Steinfeld	24	Melbourne	Nursing student	Day 1	Day 14	Dumped	
Taylor Reid	28	Melbourne	Stevedore	Day 1	Day 24	Dumped	
Mimi Paranihi	25	Sydney	Creative model	Day 1	Day 23	Dumped	
Stephane "Steph" Blackos	25	Paris, France	Model	Day 6	Day 23	Dumped	
Jade Phalen	21	Brisbane	Store manager	Day 18	Day 21	Dumped	
Zane Prophet	24	Gold Coast	Civil construction worker	Day 1	Day 21	Dumped	
Krissy Bertone	25	Perth	Makeup artist	Day 9	Day 16	Dumped	
Tommy Armour	24	Gold Coast	Electrician	Day 8	Day 12	Walked	
Sydney Paight	25	Los Angeles, United States	Influencer and model	Day 6	Day 11	Dumped	
Xanthe Wessen	21	Sydney	Property stylist	Day 1	Day 10	Dumped	
Indigo Carthew	23	Cairns	Sales manager	Day 1	Day 8	Dumped	
Eilisha Purcell	25	Brisbane	Support worker	Day 1	Day 5	Dumped	
Kane Godlevsky	23	Gold Coast	Carpenter	Day 1	Day 3	Dumped	

- ^Note 1: Dumped Islander Hannah re-entered the villa on Day 16.

=== Future appearances ===
Sydney Paight competed on season two of Love Island Games.

Dylan Towolawi returned for season seven.

== Coupling and elimination history ==
	Week 1							Week 2				Week 3				Week 4			Final
	Day 1	Day 2	Day 3	Day 5	Day 6		Day 7	Day 8	Day 10	Day 11	Day 14	Day 15	Day 16	Day 19	Day 21	Day 23		Day 24	Day 25
Em	Indigo		Indigo	Taylor				Taylor		Vulnerable	Taylor	Mercedes	Mercedes		Not eligible	Mercedes	Hannah & Taylor to dump	Safe	Winners (Day 25)
Mercedes	Not in Villa								Sophie	Immune	Sophie	Em	Em		Not eligible	Em	Hannah & Taylor to dump	Safe	Winners (Day 25
Eric	Not in Villa													Kaylah	Jade & Zane to dump	Kaylah	Mimi & Steph to dump	Safe	Runners-up (Day 25)
Kaylah	Not in Villa								Zane	Vulnerable	Zane	Steph	Zane	Eric	Jade & Zane to dump	Eric	Mimi & Steph to dump	Safe	Runners-up (Day 25)
Mia	Not in Villa										Niko	Niko	Niko		Jade & Zane to dump	Niko	Mimi & Steph to dump	Safe	Runners-up (Day 25)
Niko	Hannah		Hannah	Hannah				Hannah		Sydney to dump	Mia	Mia	Mia		Jade & Zane to dump	Mia	Mimi & Steph to dump	Safe	Runners-up (Day 25)
Dylan	Eilisha	Single	Mimi	Mimi		Single		Sophie	Krissy	Safe	Krissy	Mimi	Sophie		Vulnerable	Sophie	Hannah & Taylor to dump	Vulnerable	Dumped (Day 24)
Sophie	Not in Villa			Indigo	Steph	Indigo		Dylan	Mercedes	Vulnerable	Mercedes	Zane	Dylan		Vulnerable	Dylan	Hannah & Taylor to dump	Vulnerable	Dumped (Day 24)
Hannah	Niko		Niko	Niko				Niko		Vulnerable	Single	Dumped (Day 14)	Taylor		Jade & Zane to dump	Taylor	Mimi & Steph to dump	Vulnerable	Dumped (Day 24)
Taylor	Not in Villa	Eilisha	Eilisha	Em				Em		Safe	Em	Krissy	Hannah		Jade & Zane to dump	Hannah	Mimi & Steph to dump	Vulnerable	Dumped (Day 24)
Mimi	Zane		Dylan	Dylan		Steph		Steph		Vulnerable	Steph	Dylan	Steph		Not eligible	Steph	Eric & Kaylah to dump	Dumped (Day 23)	
Steph	Not in Villa				Sophie	Mimi		Mimi		Safe	Mimi	Kaylah	Mimi		Not eligible	Mimi	Eric & Kaylah to dump	Dumped (Day 23)	
Jade	Not in Villa													Zane	Vulnerable	Dumped (Day 21)			
Zane	Mimi		Xanthe	Xanthe		Sydney	Xanthe	Xanthe	Kaylah	Sydney to dump	Kaylah	Sophie	Kaylah	Jade	Vulnerable	Dumped (Day 21)			
Krissy	Not in Villa								Dylan	Vulnerable	Dylan	Taylor	Single	Dumped (Day 16)					
Tommy	Not in Villa							Sydney		Safe	Walked (Day 12)								
Sydney	Not in Villa				Single	Zane	Single	Tommy		Vulnerable	Dumped (Day 11)								
Xanthe	Kane		Zane	Zane		Single	Zane	Zane	Single	Dumped (Day 10)									
Indigo	Em		Em	Sophie	Single	Sophie		Single	Dumped (Day 8)										
Eilisha	Dylan	Taylor	Taylor	Single	Dumped (Day 5)														
Kane	Xanthe		Single	Dumped (Day 3)															
Notes	(Note: On Day 1, after all the islanders entered the villa, Sophie Monk revealed that the girls would run to the boy they liked the most, based on first impressions to couple up.)	(Note: On Day 2, Taylor chose a girl to couple up with. He chose to couple up with Eilisha, leaving Dylan single.)	(Note: On Day 3, the girls had to choose either to stick with their currently coupled up boy or twist with any other boy.)	none	(Note: Love Island Gods, Steph and Sydney could couple up with whoever they wanted, whenever they wanted.)		(Note: Love Island God Sydney decided to stay single.)	(Note: On Day 8, Love Island Gods' power to couple up with whoever they wanted, whenever they wanted ended.)	(Note: On Day 10, the bombshells Kaylah and Krissy stole a boy of their choice, leaving Sophie and Xanthe single and vulnerable. They both then went on speed dates with new bombshell Mercedes, who chose to couple up with Sophie.)	(Note: On Day 11, the Superfans voted for the boy most likely to find love. Niko & Zane received the most votes and had to decide to dump one girl.)	(Note: On Day 12, Tommy decided to voluntarily leave.) (Note: On Day 14, the new bombshell Mia stole Niko, leaving Hannah single and dumped.)	(Note: The Superfans coupled-up the islanders who should explore their connection in a Private retreat Hotel Amor.)	(Note: On Day 16, the islanders had to choose either to stick with their current couple or twist with any other islander.)	(Note: On Day 19, the bombshells Eric and Jade chose to couple up.)	(Note: On Day 21, the Superfans voted for the couple most loved-up. Dylan & Sophie and Jade & Zane received the least votes and were vulnerable. The rest of the couples had to decide to dump one couple.) (Note: Jade & Zane received three votes to dump, therefore, Em & Mercedes and Mimi & Steph were not eligible to vote.)	(Note: On Day 23, islanders had to couple up and lock in their couples..) (Note: On Day 23, the final six couples had to choose between love or money. If they chose to take the money, they would immediately leave the villa with $20,000, and their partner would be dumped. Nobody took the offer.)	(Note: On Day 23, the couples had to vote for the least real couple most to dump.)	(Note: The two couples with the least votes from the Superfans were dumped from the villa.)	(Note: Unlike previous votes, which were decided by the Superfans, Australia voted for the winner.)
Walked	none										Tommy	none							
Dumped	No; Dumping		Kane; Failed to couple up	Eilisha; Failed to couple up	No; Dumping			Indigo; Failed to couple up	Xanthe; Failed to couple up	Sydney; Niko's & Zane's choice to dump	Hannah; Failed to couple up	No; Dumping	Krissy; Failed to couple up	No; Dumping	Jade & Zane; Islanders' choice to dump	No; Dumping	Mimi & Steph; Islanders' choice to dump	Dylan & Sophie; Superfans' choice to dump	Eric & Kaylah; Mia & Niko; Least votes to win
Dumped	No; Dumping		Kane; Failed to couple up	Eilisha; Failed to couple up	No; Dumping			Indigo; Failed to couple up	Xanthe; Failed to couple up	Sydney; Niko's & Zane's choice to dump	Hannah; Failed to couple up	No; Dumping	Krissy; Failed to couple up	No; Dumping	Jade & Zane; Islanders' choice to dump	No; Dumping	Mimi & Steph; Islanders' choice to dump	Hannah & Taylor; Superfans' choice to dump	Em & Mercedes; Most votes to win
Ref	none				none							none		none		none			

== Weekly summary ==
The main events in the Love Island AUS villa are summarized in the table below.

Week 1	Entrances	On Day 1, Dylan, Eilisha, Em, Hannah, Indigo, Kane, Mimi, Niko, Xanthe, and Zane entered the villa. Taylor entered as a bombshell that night.; On Day 4, Sophie entered the villa.; On Day 6, Steph and Sydney entered the villa as Love Island Gods.
Week 1	Coupling	On Day 1, the islanders coupled up for the first time. The first couples were Eilisha and Dylan, Em and Indigo, Hannah and Niko, Mimi and Zane, and Xanthe and Kane.; On Day 2, Taylor got to choose one girl to couple up with. He picked Eilisha, leaving Dylan single.; On Day 3, the girls were able to choose if they wanted to stick in their current couple, or couple up with a new boy. Eilisha and Taylor, Em and Indigo, and Hannah and Niko stayed together, whilst Mimi coupled up with Dylan, and Xanthe picked Zane. Kane was left single and dumped from the island.; On Day 5, the islanders recoupled. Hannah and Niko, Mimi and Dylan, and Xanthe and Zane stayed together, whilst Em and Taylor coupled up, and Sophie and Indigo got together, leaving Eilisha dumped.; On Day 6, Steph and Sydney could couple up with whoever they wanted, whenever they wanted as the Love Island Gods. Steph chose to couple up with Sophie, leaving Indigo single. Sydney originally chose to stay single, but later chose Zane, leaving Xanthe single.; On Day 7, Steph chose to recouple with Mimi, leaving Dylan single. Sophie returned to her couple with Indigo. Sydney chose to stay single, so Zane returned to his couple with Xanthe.
Week 1	Challenges	On Day 1, Sophie Monk revealed that the girls would run to the boy they liked the most, based on first impressions to couple up.
Week 1	Exits	On Day 3, Kane was dumped from the villa after failing to couple up.; On Day 5, Eilisha was dumped from the villa after failing to couple up.
Week 2	Entrances	On Day 8, Tommy entered the villa.; On Day 9, Kaylah and Krissy entered the villa.; On Day 10, Mercedes entered the villa.; On Day 13, Mia entered the villa.
Week 2	Coupling	On Day 8, the islanders coupled up again. Em and Taylor, Hannah and Niko, Mimi and Steph, and Xanthe and Zane stayed together, while Sydney and Tommy coupled up, and Sophie and Dylan got together.; On Day 10, Kaylah and Krissy stole a boy of their choice. Kaylah picked Zane, and Krissy picked Dylan, leaving Sophie and Xanthe single and vulnerable. After going on speed dates with new bombshell Mercedes, he could choose which girl to couple up with. He chose Sophie, leaving Xanthe dumped from the villa.; On Day 14, Mia got to choose one boy to couple up with. She chose Niko, leaving Hannah single and dumped.
Week 2	Dates	On Day 10, after Sophie and Xanthe were left single and vulnerable, they got to go on speed dates with Mercedes.
Week 2	Exits	On Day 8, Indigo was dumped from the villa after failing to couple up.; On Day 10, Xanthe was dumped from the villa after failing to couple up.; On Day 11, the Superfans voted for which boy they thought was most likely to find love. Niko and Zane received the most votes and got to choose which girl to dump. They both chose Sydney, leaving her dumped from the island.; On Day 12, Tommy voluntarily left the villa.; On Day 14, Mia coupled up with Niko, leaving Hannah single and dumped.
Week 3	Entrances	On Day 16, Hannah re-entered the villa.; On Day 18, Eric and Jade entered the villa.
Week 3	Coupling	On Day 15, the Superfans coupled-up the islanders who should explore their connection in Hotel Amor. They chose Em and Mercedes, Kaylah and Steph, Krissy and Taylor, Mia and Niko, Mimi and Dylan, and Sophie and Zane.; On Day 16, the islanders had to choose either to stick with their current couple or twist with any other islander. Em and Mercedes, and Mia and Niko stayed together, while Kaylah and Zane, Mimi and Steph, and Sophie and Dylan all got back together. As Hannah re-entered the villa for Taylor, he had the choice to stay with Krissy or twist with Hannah. He chose Hannah, leaving Krissy dumped.; On Day 19, Eric and Jade were given the opportunity to couple up. Eric picked Kaylah, while Jade chose Zane.
Week 3	Dates	On Day 15, Em and Mercedes, Kaylah and Steph, Krissy and Taylor, Mia and Niko, Mimi and Dylan, and Sophie and Zane all entered Hotel Amor.
Week 3	Exits	On Day 16, Krissy was dumped from the island after failing to couple up.; On Day 21, the Superfans voted for the couple that was the most loved-up. Dylan and Sophie, and Jade and Zane received the least votes and were vulnerable. The rest of the couples had to decide to dump one couple. Eric and Kaylah, Hannah and Taylor, and Mia and Niko all voted to dump Jade and Zane, giving them the most votes and therefore dumped from the island.
Week 4	Coupling	On Day 23, the islanders had to recouple for the final time. Dylan and Sophie, Em and Mercedes, Eric and Kaylah, Hannah and Taylor, Mia and Niko, and Mimi and Steph all stayed together in their couples.
Week 4	Exits	On Day 23, the final six couples had to vote for the couple that was the least real couple to dump. Mimi and Steph voted for Eric and Kaylah, Em and Mercedes, and Dylan and Sophie voted for Hannah and Taylor. Eric and Kaylah, Hannah and Taylor, and Mia and Niko all voted for Mimi and Steph, leaving them dumped from the villa.; On Day 24, the Superfans voted for their favorite couples. After receiving the least amount of votes, Dylan and Sophie, and Hannah and Taylor were dumped.; On Day 25, Em and Mercedes received the most votes to win, leaving Eric and Kaylah, and Mia and Niko as the runners-up.
