= Lucinda Strafford =

English television personality (born 1999)

- Born: Lucinda Frances Roy Strafford; 4 November 1999 (age 27); Brighton, East Sussex, England
- Occupation: Television personality
- Years active: 2021–present
- Known for: Love Island; Love Island Australia; Love Island Games (Winner); Love Island: All Stars

Lucinda Frances Roy Strafford (born 4 November 1999) is an English television personality and social media influencer. She was a contestant on the seventh series of Love Island (2021) and the runner-up of the fifth series of Love Island Australia (2023), before winning the second series of Love Island Games (2025) and finishing fourth on the third series of Love Island: All Stars (2026).

== Life and career ==
Lucinda Frances Roy Strafford was born on 4 November 1999 in Brighton, England. Prior to appearing on television, she worked as cabin crew for British Airways and owned an online fashion boutique The Luxe Range. In June 2021, she became a contestant on the seventh series of the ITV2 reality dating show Love Island. She entered as a "bombshell" on Day 9, alongside Millie Court. She coupled up with Brad McClelland and Aaron Francis, before being dumped alongside the latter on Day 28 of the series after receiving the fewest votes. In October 2023, Strafford joined the fifth series of Love Island Australia, entering as a bombshell on Day 2. She ultimately finished as joint runner-up of the series with Zac Nunns, alongside Clint Posselt and Savannah Badger.

In September 2025, Strafford became a contestant on the second series of Love Island Games. She ultimately won the series alongside Isaiah Campbell from Love Island USA. In January 2026, it was announced that Strafford would return to Love Island to appear as a contestant on the third series of Love Island: All Stars. As in her original series, she entered as a "bombshell" on Day 9, alongside Curtis Pritchard and ultimately finished in fourth place alongside Sean Stone. Having appeared on four versions of the Love Island franchise, she is the most frequently appeared female contestant.

== Filmography ==
As herself
Year	Title	Notes	Ref.
2021	Love Island	Contestant; series 7	
2023	Love Island Australia	Runner-up; series 5	
2025	Love Island Games	Winner; series 2	
2026	Love Island: All Stars	Fourth Place; series 3	
