= Love Island Australia season 4 =

2022 season of the reality television series

Love Island Australia
- Season 4
- Hosted by: Sophie Monk
- No. of days: 30
- No. of contestants: 23
- Winners: Austen Bugeja & Claudia Bonifazio
- Runners-up: Mitchell Elliot & Phoebe Spiller; Callum Hole & Madeline Wilcox
- No. of episodes: 29

Release
- Original network: 9Now
- Original release: 31 October – 20 December 2022

Season chronology
- ← Previous; Season 3 Next → Season 5

The fourth season of Love Island Australia premiered on 9Now on Monday, 31 October 2022 presented by Sophie Monk and narrated by Eoghan McDermott.

== Format ==
Love Island Australia involves a group of contestants, known as "Islanders", living in a villa in Mallorca looking to find love. To remain in the competition, the Islanders must be coupled up with another Islander, as the winning couple wins $50,000. On the first day, the Islanders couple up for the first time based on first impressions. However, throughout the series they may choose to "re-couple" and couple up with another Islander instead. Islanders may join the villa at several stages throughout the season.

Islanders who are single after each re-coupling risk being eliminated and "dumped" from the island. Islanders can also be eliminated via public vote, or through other means such as deciding among themselves who to vote off the island. During the finale, the public vote for a couple they want to win the series and the $50,000 prize. One person from the winning couple can then either split the money with their partner or keep it for themselves.

Season 4 was pre-recorded in August 2022. All previous seasons of the show across the franchise have aired on a short delay, but while filming was still taking place to allow for public votes. An ITV Studios executive producer stated the change in format was so that the season would air during late spring and early summer in the Southern Hemisphere, but be filmed in the Mediterranean when the weather was still warm. A select group of "Love Island Superfans" were given access to live video feeds from the villa to participate in elimination votes, challenge polls, and date selections.

== Islanders ==
The first Islanders were announced on social media, one week before the premiere episode. Of the islanders who have participated on Love Island Australia 4 include Love Island Australia 3 winners Mitch Hibberd and Tina Provis (separated since winning their show).

Name	Age	Hometown	Occupation	Entered	Exited	Status
Austen Bugeja	22	Sydney	Spray Painter	Day 1	Day 30	Winner
Claudia Bonifazio	23	Adelaide	Medical Secretary	Day 1	Day 30	Winner
Callum Hole	24	Brisbane (Note: Callum Hole is originally from Wales in the United Kingdom but was residing in Brisbane at the time of casting and filming.)	Personal Trainer	Day 2	Day 30	Runner-up
Madeline Wilcox (Note: Hugh and Madeline are twins.)	25	Melbourne	Makeup Artist	Day 23	Day 30	Runner-up
Mitchell Eliot	25	Sydney	Personal Trainer	Day 1	Day 30	Runner-up
Phoebe Spiller	22	Sydney	Fashion Student	Day 1	Day 30	Runner-up
Al Perkins	26	Sydney	Influencer	Day 8	Day 29	Dumped
Jessica Losurdo	26	Sydney	Risk Analyst	Day 1	Day 29	Dumped
Mitch Hibberd	25	Melbourne	Footballer	Day 19	Day 28	Dumped
Tina Provis	26	Sydney	Influencer	Day 20	Day 28	Dumped
Hugh Wilcox	25	Melbourne	Business Owner	Day 23	Day 27	Dumped
Stella Hutcheon	24	Brisbane	Radio Media Coordinator	Day 1	Day 27	Dumped
Jordan Dowsett	25	Gold Coast	FIFO Electrician	Day 1	Day 26	Dumped
Phoebe Han	22	Brisbane	Deli Worker	Day 12	Day 24	Dumped
Tak Chipangura	23	Brisbane	Security Guard	Day 2	Day 22	Dumped
Maddy Gillbanks	26	Perth	HR advisor	Day 6	Day 21	Dumped
Jason Shtjefni	25	Adelaide (Note: Jason Shtjefni is originally from Florida in the United States but was residing in Adelaide at the time of casting and filming.)	Day Trader	Day 18	Day 19	Walked
Vakoo Kauapirua	27	Sydney	Model	Day 12	Day 17	Dumped
Ben Gleeson	25	Sydney	Personal Trainer	Day 14	Day 16	Dumped
Layla John	20	Melbourne	Student	Day 1	Day 14	Dumped
Conor Howard	26	Sydney	Real Estate Agent	Day 1	Day 10	Dumped
Holly Oakes-Ferguson	25	Brisbane	Customer Service Representative	Day 1	Day 10	Dumped
Andre Coutinho	24	Perth	Mental Health Support Worker	Day 1	Day 5	Dumped

=== Future appearances ===
Mitch Hibberd, Callum Hole, Jessica Losurdo, and Tina Provis appeared on season one of Love Island Games.

== Coupling and elimination history ==
	Week 1				Week 2			Week 3			Week 4						Week 5	Final
	Day 1	Day 2	Day 5	Day 7	Day 9	Day 10	Day 14	Day 16	Day 17	Day 21	Day 22	Day 24		Day 26	Day 27	Day 28	Day 29	Day 30
Austen	Layla		Claudia		Claudia	Holly to dump	Claudia	Safe	Claudia	Immune	Claudia		Safe	Claudia	Vulnerable	Mitch & Tina to dump	Safe	Winners (Day 30)
Claudia	Jordan	Single	Austen		Austen	Conor to dump	Austen	Safe	Austen	Safe	Austen		Safe	Austen	Vulnerable	Mitch & Tina to dump	Safe	Winners (Day 30)
Callum	Not in Villa		Layla		Layla	Safe	Vakoo	Safe	Maddy	Maddy to dump	Tina	Madeline	Immune	Madeline	Vulnerable	Mitch & Tina to dump	Safe	Runners-up (Day 30)
Madeline	Not in Villa											Callum	Immune	Callum	Vulnerable	Mitch & Tina to dump	Safe	Runners-up (Day 30)
Mitchell	Phoebe S.		Phoebe S.	Maddy	Phoebe S.	Safe	Phoebe S.	Safe	Phoebe S.	Immune	Phoebe S.		Vulnerable	Phoebe S.	Safe	Mitch & Tina to dump	Safe	Runners-up (Day 30)
Phoebe S.	Mitchell		Mitchell	Single	Mitchell	Safe	Mitchell	Safe	Mitchell	Safe	Mitchell		Safe	Mitchell	Hugh & Stella to dump	Mitch & Tina to dump	Safe	Runners-up (Day 30)
Al	Not in Villa				Jessica	Safe	Jessica	Ben & Stella; Vulnerable	Jessica	Maddy to dump	Jessica		Safe	Jessica	Hugh & Stella to dump	Callum & Madeline to dump	Vulnerable	Dumped (Day 29)
Jessica	Conor		Conor		Al	Safe	Al	Ben & Stella; Vulnerable	Al	Vulnerable	Al		Safe	Al	Safe	Callum & Madeline to dump	Vulnerable	Dumped (Day 29)
Mitch	Not in Villa									Immune	Stella	Single	Safe	Tina	Safe	Callum & Madeline to dump	Dumped (Day 28)	
Tina	Not in Villa									Safe	Callum	Single	Safe	Mitch	Hugh & Stella to dump	Callum & Madeline to dump	Dumped (Day 28)	
Hugh	Not in Villa											Stella	Immune	Stella	Vulnerable	Dumped (Day 27)		
Stella	Andre		Jordan		Jordan	Conor to dump	Ben	Vulnerable	Tak	Safe	Mitch	Hugh	Immune	Hugh	Vulnerable	Dumped (Day 27)		
Jordan	Claudia	Holly	Stella		Stella	Holly to dump	Phoebe H.	Safe	Phoebe H.	Maddy to dump	Phoebe H.		Vulnerable	Single	Dumped (Day 26)			
Phoebe H.	Not in Villa						Jordan	Safe	Jordan	Vulnerable	Jordan		Vulnerable	Dumped (Day 24)				
Tak	Not in Villa		Holly		Maddy	Vulnerable	Maddy	Safe	Stella	Immune	Single	Dumped (Day 22)						
Maddy	Not in Villa			Mitchell	Tak	Vulnerable	Tak	Safe	Callum	Vulnerable	Dumped (Day 21)							
Jason	Not in Villa									Walked (Day 19)								
Vakoo	Not in Villa						Callum	Safe	Single	Dumped (Day 17)								
Ben	Not in Villa						Stella	Vulnerable	Dumped (Day 16)									
Layla	Austen		Callum		Callum	Safe	Single	Dumped (Day 14)										
Conor	Jessica		Jessica		Holly	Vulnerable	Dumped (Day 10)											
Holly	Single	Jordan	Tak		Conor	Vulnerable	Dumped (Day 10)											
Andre	Stella		Single	Dumped (Day 5)														
Notes	1		2	3	-	4	5	6	none	7	none							
Walked	none									Jason	none							
Dumped	No; Dumping	~~Claudia~~; ~~Failed to~~ ~~couple up~~	Andre; Failed to couple up	No; Dumping		Conor; Claudia & Stella's choice to dump	Layla; Failed to couple up	Ben; Ben & Stella's choice to dump	Vakoo; Failed to couple up	Maddy; Al, Callum & Jordan choice to dump	Tak; Failed to couple up	No; Dumping	Phoebe H. Australia’s choice to dump	Jordan; Failed to couple up	Hugh & Stella; Al, Phoebe S. & Tina's choice to dump	Mitch & Tina; Islanders' choice to dump	Al & Jessica; Australia’s choice to dump	Callum & Madeline; Mitchell & Phoebe S. Fewest votes to win
Dumped	No; Dumping	~~Claudia~~; ~~Failed to~~ ~~couple up~~	Andre; Failed to couple up	No; Dumping		Holly; Jordan & Austen's choice to dump	Layla; Failed to couple up	Ben; Ben & Stella's choice to dump	Vakoo; Failed to couple up	Maddy; Al, Callum & Jordan choice to dump	Tak; Failed to couple up	No; Dumping	Phoebe H. Australia’s choice to dump	Jordan; Failed to couple up	Hugh & Stella; Al, Phoebe S. & Tina's choice to dump	Mitch & Tina; Islanders' choice to dump	Al & Jessica; Australia’s choice to dump	Austen & Claudia; Most votes to win

- ^Note 1: Holly was single after the first coupling. On Day 2, Holly chose to couple up with Jordan, leaving Claudia single. All other Day 1 couples remained the same. Claudia was fake dumped and returned to the villa with two new boys, Callum and Tak.
- ^Note 2: As new arrivals, Callum and Tak were able to steal a partner for themselves on Day 5. Tak chose Holly and Callum chose Layla. All other remaining girls recoupled with the boys.
- ^Note 3: As new arrival, Maddy was able steal a partner for herself. She chose Mitchell.
- ^Note 4: The two couples with the fewest votes were Vulnerable and the power to dump was with the two couples with the most votes.
- ^Note 5: As new arrivals, Phoebe H and Vakoo were able to steal a partner for themselves on Day 14. Phoebe H chose Jordan and Vakoo chose Callum. Then Ben the new bomb had a 5-minute date with single girls Layla and Stella. And immediately Ben had to couple-up with one of them. He chose Stella.
- ^Note 6: Al and Jessica went on a date and received a text to choose one couple to be Vulnerable. They chose Ben & Stella. Ben & Stella had to mutually decide who to be dumped.
- ^Note 7: Al, Callum and Jordan had to decide to dump one of the bottom three girls.
