= 9Now =

Australian video on demand service

- Website type: Video on demand, OTT, Catch up, live streaming
- Available in: English
- Predecessor: 9Jumpin (2014–16)
- Headquarters: North Sydney, New South Wales, Australia
- Area served: Australia
- Owner: Nine Entertainment Co.
- CEO: Mike Sneesby
- Services: streaming service
- Website: 9now.com.au
- Commercial: Yes
- Registration: Free
- Launched: 27 January 2016; 10 years ago
- Current status: Active

9Now is a live stream, video on demand, and catch-up TV service run by the Nine Network in Australia. The service launched on 27 January 2016, replacing Nine's previous service 9Jumpin. 9Now offers online live streaming of Channel 9, 9Gem, 9Go!, 9Life and 9Rush, as well as live news via nine.com.au.

In 2016, 9Now was at the centre of a legal challenge by then Nine regional television partner WIN Television, which helped contribute to an affiliation swaps for Nine and competitor Network 10.

As of January 2019, Nine claims to have more than 7m signups to its platform.

== History ==
=== 2010–2013: FIXPlay ===
On 12 April 2010, as a part of its online entertainment brand TheFIX, the Ninemsn Company released FIXPlay, an online video on demand catch-up TV service for the Nine Network, incorporating locally produced programs from Nine and GO! along with back-catalogue content from local and international distributors. FIXPlay became the second catch-up TV service released by a commercial Australian network, the first being PLUS7 from Yahoo7 and the Seven Network.

=== 2012–2013: Jump-in ===
On 26 July 2012, Nine released Jump-in, a trial social television app on iPhone and iPad for its coverage of the 2012 Summer Olympic Games. The app allowed users to view information on the television broadcast, set reminders and comment on events, view the full Olympic schedule, latest medal tally, event results, news coverage and other video highlights. After its success throughout the Olympics, Jump-in was commercially launched on 4 February 2013 as an interactive television app that allowed viewers a behind-the-scenes insight into select television series, voting and posting live comments on select television series (that would appear on-screen), and entering competitions.

=== 2013–2016: 9Jumpin ===
On 8 November 2013, FIXPlay was merged into Jump-in, later renamed to 9Jumpin in May 2014, integrating catch-up TV with interactive social media. The app's original interactive TV features were integrated into its new website, while new catch-up content was now available on mobile devices. The 9Jumpin website was closed on 28 January 2016, one day after the silent launch of 9Now.

=== 2016–present: 9Now ===
In October 2015, with the upcoming launch of 9Life and relaunch of 9HD and looming network-wide rebrand, Nine announced that 9Jumpin would be replaced with an entirely new service called 9Now. Pete Wiltshire, chief revenue officer of Nine Entertainment Co., stated that "[9Jumpin] was never designed to be streaming product and it isn't" and announced that the purpose-built 9Now service will replace 9Jumpin as Nine's on-demand catch-up TV service with a wider range of content, while also delivering live streaming of Channel 9, 9Gem, 9Go! and 9Life. 9Now was described as "a premium destination for live streaming, catch-up and on-demand content for all of the Nine Network's linear channels". The 9Now website and app were launched on 27 January 2016 along with live streaming for Nine, with live streaming for the multichannels to launch on a later date. However, unlike competitors 7plus, ABC iview, SBS on Demand, and 10Play, 9Now requires users to create an account before allowing access to catch-up content and live streaming. Livestreams for 9Go!, 9Gem and 9Life were launched on 17 May 2016.

Following the launch of 9Now, Nine's main regional affiliate WIN Television sued Nine Entertainment Co., alleging that the service violated its program supply agreement by broadcasting Nine programming into territories where it held exclusive rights. Justice Hammerschlag of the NSW Supreme Court dismissed the case on 28 April 2016, ruling that Nine had the right to stream its programming nationally because the affiliation agreement's definition of "broadcasting" did not cover live internet streaming. Nine's victory prompted network executives to revoke WIN's affiliation with the network beyond June 2016, and enter into a new regional affiliation with Southern Cross Austereo (WIN would concurrently switch to Network 10).

On 4 August 2017, 9Now received a new logo, further confirming the service's relationship with the Nine Network, as the platform received 4 million signups.

On 30 June 2022, 9Now was discontinued for the PlayStation 4.

On 14 September 2022, at Nine Entertainment's 2022 upfront, Nine announced some changes to the platform, including Full HD channels, FAST channels, and an innovative new homepage that allows users to dive straight into the live content stream. On 6 December 2022, 9Now added a start over feature that will go back to the very beginning of a show. The Start Over feature was meant to be launched in October 2022. The new homepage of the platform was launched in August 2023. On 25 October 2023, Pedestrian TV a dedicated FAST channels launched on 9Now.

== Content and programming ==
9Now provides on-demand access to almost all the TV programs that are broadcast on the Nine Network linear broadcast channels (Channel 9, 9Gem, 9Go!, 9Life and 9Rush).

Programs are categorised by these genres:

- Comedy
- Documentary
- Drama
- Entertainment
- Family
- Kids
- Lifestyle
- News & Current Affairs
- Podcast
- Reality
- Sci-Fi & Fantasy
- Special Events
- Special Interest
- Sport
- True Crime

=== Live Sports ===
- Australian Swimming Championships (2023–present)
- Women's National Basketball League (2022–present)

== Availability ==
Through the streaming platform, 9Now provides access to the whole Nine Network suite of channels, including the main and multi-channels.

As of April 2024, the following online only 24/7 channels are also available:

- BBC TopGear
- BBC COMEDY
- BBC FOOD
- BBC EARTH
- BBC ANTIQUES ROADSHOW
- BBC HOME & GARDEN
- 9Crime
- LMN
- Seinfeld
- 60 Minutes Australia
- The Block
- Married at First Sight
- Dance Moms
- Pedestrian TV
- H2

== Logos and screenshots ==
=== Logos ===
9jumpin logo (2014 – 27 January 2016)

9Now logo (27 January 2016 – 28 July 2017)

9Now logo (28 July 2017 – present)

=== Screenshot ===
2016 screenshot of 9Now

== See also ==
- Stan
- Internet television in Australia
