= Tyrique Hyde =

TV personality and footballer (born 1999)

Personal information
- Birth name: Tyrique Micah Hyde
- Date of birth: 8 April 1999 (age 27)
- Place of birth: Essex
- Height: 1.79 m (5 ft 10 in)
- Position: Central midfielder

Youth career
- Dagenham & Redbridge
- Colchester United

Senior career*
Years	Team	Apps	(Gls)
2019	Maldon & Tiptree	3	(0)
2020 -2021	Dulwich Hamlet	14	(1)
2021-2022	Dartford	19	(3)
2021	Hemel Hempstead (loan)	7	(0)
2022	Welling United	9	(2)
2022-2023	Lewes F.C	1	(0)
- * Club domestic league appearances and goals

Tyrique Micah Hyde (born 8 April 1999) is an English television personality and former semi-professional footballer, most recently playing as a midfielder for Lewes FC in the Isthmian League. In 2023, he finished in third place on the tenth series of Love Island, later appearing on the second series of the international spin-off Love Island Games.

== Club Career ==
=== Youth Career ===
==== Dagenham & Redbridge ====
Hyde joined the Daggers youth system when he was young under his father Micah Hyde who was academy Head Coach. He made his debut in an FA Cup replay against Halifax Town FC.

==== Colchester United ====
At the age of 19 Hyde was signed from Dagenham & Redbridge joining after a two week trial to Colchester's U23 team on a contract until 2020.

=== Senior Career ===
==== Dulwich Hamlet ====
At the age of 21 he signed for Dulwich Hamlet.

==== Lewes F.C ====
After stints in the Isthmian League as well as the National League South, Hyde signed for Lewes F.C. He played for the club until he was announced for Love island series 10.

== Television ==
In 2023, Hyde was announced as a contestant on the ITV2 dating series Love Island, entering the villa as an original islander on Day 1. Whilst the show he spoke about his struggles with being deaf in one ear, and having coupled up with Ella Thomas from Day 1, went on to finish third alongside her on the show. In 2025, he took part in the second series of Love Island Games, ultimately finishing as runner-up. In 2026, he appeared as a regular panellist on Love Island: Aftersun. He is set to compete on Celebrity SAS: Who Dares Wins in 2027.

== Personal life ==
Hyde is the son of former Premier league player Micah Hyde. Hyde is deaf in one ear and has a lightning tattoo beneath his earlobe to signify it. Hyde and Ella Thomas who he met on Love island were in a relationship until they announced their breakup in 2024. As of May 2026 he is in a relationship with fellow former Love Islander Samie Eilishi. In October 2026, Hyde and Elishi confirmed they were expecting their first child.

== Controversies ==
In November 2024 Hyde was caught behind the wheel of an uninsured Mercedes in Grays, Essex. He was subsequently fined and his license was suspended for 6 months.
