= Love Island USA season 2 =

2020 season of Love Island USA

Love Island USA
- Season 2
- Promotional poster for the season
- Hosted by: Arielle Vandenberg
- No. of days: 40
- No. of contestants: 31
- Winners: Caleb Corprew; Justine Ndiba
- Runners-up: Johnny Middlebrooks; Cely Vazquez
- No. of episodes: 34

Release
- Original network: CBS
- Original release: August 24 – September 30, 2020

Season chronology
- ← Previous; Season 1 Next → Season 3

The second season of Love Island premiered August 24, 2020 on CBS. This season was originally scheduled to premiere on May 21, 2020 and was to be taking place in Fiji for second consecutive season; however, when the COVID-19 pandemic in Fiji forced production to postpone indefinitely. CBS later announced that Love Island would be relocated to film on the roof of Las Vegas, Nevada, The Cromwell — a casino hotel on the Las Vegas Strip. Matthew Hoffman provided voice-over narration.

== Format ==
Love Island is a reality television program in which a group of contestants, who are referred to as "Islanders", are living in a villa in Las Vegas. The Islanders are cut off from the outside world and are under constant video surveillance. To survive in the villa, the Islanders must be in a relationship with another Islander. The Islanders couple up for the first time on first impressions but they are later forced to "re-couple" at special ceremonies in which they can choose to remain with their current partners or to switch partners. At the villa, the couples must share a bed for sleeping and are permitted to talk with other Islanders at any time, allowing them to get to know everyone. While in the villa, each Islander has his or her own telephone, with which they can contact other Islanders via text and can receive text messages informing them of the latest challenges, dumpings, and re-couplings. The Islanders are presented with many games and challenges that are designed to test their physical and mental abilities, after which the winners are sometimes presented with special prizes, such as a night at the Hideaway or a special date.

Islanders can be eliminated, or "dumped", for several reasons; these include remaining single after a re-coupling and by public vote through the Love Island mobile app. During the show's final week, members of the public vote to decide which couple should win the series; the couple who receive the most votes win.

At the envelope ceremony on finale night, the couple who received the highest number of votes from the public receive two envelopes, one for each partner. One envelope contains $100,000 and the other contains nothing. The partner with the $100,000 envelope may choose whether to share the money with his or her partner as a test of trust and commitment.

== Islanders ==
The original islanders of the second season of Love Island USA. Top: Mackenzie, Kaitlynn, Cely, Justine and Moira Bottom row: Jeremiah, James, Tre, Carrington, Connor and Johnny

On August 17, 2020, the initial islanders were revealed.

Noah Purvis was removed from the villa on Day 28 due to him having a pornographic career before appearing on the show.

Islander	Age	Residence	Entered	Exited	Status	Ref
Caleb Corprew	24	Oklahoma City, Oklahoma	Day 5	Day 40	Winner	
Justine Ndiba	27	Rockaway, New Jersey	Day 1	Day 40	Winner	
Cely Vazquez	24	Sacramento, California	Day 1	Day 40	Runner-up	
Johnny Middlebrooks	22	Chesapeake, Virginia	Day 1	Day 40	Runner-up	
Calvin Cobb	25	Houston, Texas	Day 5	Day 40	Third place	
Moira Tumas	28	Brielle, New Jersey	Day 1	Day 40	Third place	
Carrington Rodriguez	23	Salt Lake City, Utah	Day 1	Day 40	Fourth place	
Laurel Goldman	22	Auburn, Alabama	Day 16	Day 40	Fourth place	
Bennett Sipes	26	Baltimore, Maryland	Day 26	Day 37	Dumped	
Lakeyn Call	21	Yorktown, Virginia	Day 30	Day 37	Dumped	
Julia Hall	26	Fayetteville, North Carolina	Day 30	Day 33	Dumped	
Kierstan Saulter	23	Castroville, Texas	Day 2	Day 33	Dumped	
Bennie Bivens	24	Barnegat, New Jersey	Day 26	Day 29	Dumped	
Connor Trott	23	Pittsburgh, Pennsylvania	Day 1	Day 29	Dumped	
Noah Purvis	24	Imperial, Missouri	Day 26	Day 28	Removed	
Aaron Owen	26	Henderson, Nevada	Day 16	Day 25	Dumped	
Jalen Noble	27	Nashville, Tennessee	Day 16	Day 25	Dumped	
Mackenzie Dipman	24	Scottsdale, Arizona	Day 1	Day 25	Dumped	
Sheribel 'Sher' Suarez	22	Orlando, Florida	Day 16	Day 25	Dumped	
De'Andre Asbury-Heath	25	North Miami Beach, Florida	Day 16	Day 19	Dumped	
Mike Jenkerson	26	San Jose, California	Day 16	Day 19	Dumped	
Patrick 'Pat' Albasha	28	San Dimas, California	Day 16	Day 19	Dumped	
Faith Tyrell	26	Kansas City, Missouri	Day 16	Day 19	Dumped	
GiNiele 'Gigi' Reitzell	24	Paramount, California	Day 16	Day 19	Dumped	
Mercades Schell	26	Las Cruces, New Mexico	Day 16	Day 19	Dumped	
Trevon 'Tre' Forte	25	Boca Raton, Florida	Day 1	Day 14	Dumped	
Lauren Coogan	29	Oxford, United Kingdom (Note: Lauren Coogan is originally from Oxford, England in the United Kingdom but was residing in Los Angeles, California at the time of casting and filming.)	Day 10	Day 14	Dumped	
Rachel Lundell	21	Minneapolis, Minnesota	Day 2	Day 12	Dumped	
Jeremiah White	22	De Kalb, Mississippi	Day 1	Day 9	Dumped	
James McCool	27	Winchester, Virginia	Day 1	Day 9	Dumped	
Kaitlynn Anderson	27	Lapeer, Michigan	Day 1	Day 5	Dumped	

=== Future appearances ===
In 2021, Jeremiah White and Lauren Coogan competed on the thirty-seventh season of The Challenge. Coogan also appeared in episode 6 of HBO Max series FBOY Island.

In 2022, Mackenzie Dipman appeared in the sixth season of Summer House. Sher Suarez appeared on the fifth season of MTV's Ex on the Beach. Johnny Middlebrooks competed on Paramount+ original All Star Shore and competed on the thirty-eighth season of The Challenge. Dipman later returned as a bombshell for the fourth season of Love Island USA. Cely Vazquez and Justine Ndiba competed on The Challenge: USA.

In 2023, Ndiba returned to compete on The Challenge: World Championship. Carrington Rodriguez, Middlebrooks, Ndiba, and Vazquez all appeared on season one of Love Island Games.

In 2025, Ndiba and Rodriguez appeared on season three of Perfect Match. Kierstan Saulter and Vazquez made guest appearances on Love Island: Beyond the Villa. Ndiba and Middlebrooks returned for season 2 of Love Island Games.

In 2026, Rodriguez and Suarez appeared on series three of Love Island: All Stars. Middlebrooks appeared on season three of House of Villains.

== Production ==
CBS originally announced on February 14, 2020 the second season would premiere on May 21, 2020, scheduled to take place in Fiji, and was initially to end at the end of June before the Fourth of July holiday to avoid scheduling conflicts with the 2020 Summer Olympics in Tokyo, Japan. The second season was subsequently placed on hold with a new season premiere date to be determined after the network announced on April 7 they would launch CBS Sunday Movie for a five-week run starting on May 3 after television productions were shut down due to the ongoing COVID-19 pandemic. An article from The Hollywood Reporter on April 7, 2020 noted that CBS would be without new seasons of Big Brother and Love Island during the summer. Unnamed sources to the publication said the network would rely on repeats of their scripted shows that "have historically repeated well." Kelly Kahl, President of CBS Entertainment, said the network was "optimistic" about airing both shows during the summer "a little later than usual" in an interview with Deadline Hollywood on May 19, 2020.

CBS revealed on July 23, 2020 that the next season of Big Brother would premiere on August 5 with new protocols to protect the cast and crew from COVID-19. The day prior, Vulture reported that pre-production has started on the second season of Love Island. Filming for the second season took place at The Cromwell in Las Vegas on a bio-secure bubble zone instead of an international destination like with season one due to international travel restrictions related to COVID-19. The network and ITV required everyone involved with the show to undergo quarantine prior to the beginning of production.

== Coupling and elimination history ==
	Week 1			Week 2			Week 3	Week 4		Week 5		Week 6		
	Day 1	Day 2	Day 5	Day 9	Day 12	Day 14	Day 19	Day 23	Day 25	Day 29	Day 33	Day 37	Final	
Caleb	Not in Villa			Rachel	Justine	Safe	Justine	Justine	Safe	Justine	Justine	Bennett & Lakeyn to dump	Split the 100k	Winner (Day 40)
Justine	Jeremiah		Tre	Tre	Caleb	Safe	Caleb	Caleb	Safe	Caleb	Caleb	Bennett & Lakeyn to dump	Winner (Day 40)	
Cely	Tre	Johnny	Johnny	Johnny	Johnny	Safe	Johnny	Johnny	Safe	Johnny	Johnny	Carrington & Laurel to dump	Runner-up (Day 40)	
Johnny	Single	Cely	Cely	Cely	Cely	Safe	Cely	Cely	Safe	Cely	Cely	Carrington & Laurel to dump	Runner-up (Day 40)	
Calvin	Not in Villa			Moira	Moira	Safe	Sher	Kierstan	Safe	Moira	Moira	Bennett & Lakeyn to dump	Third place (Day 40)	
Moira	James		James	Calvin	Calvin	Safe	Aaron	Connor	Safe	Calvin	Calvin	Bennett & Lakeyn to dump	Third place (Day 40)	
Carrington	Kaitlynn		Kierstan	Kierstan	Kierstan	Vulnerable	Laurel	Laurel	Vulnerable	Laurel	Laurel	Bennett & Lakeyn to dump	Fourth place (Day 40)	
Laurel	Not in Villa						Carrington	Carrington	Vulnerable	Carrington	Carrington	Bennett & Lakeyn to dump	Fourth place (Day 40)	
Bennett	Not in Villa									Kierstan	Lakeyn	Carrington & Laurel to dump	Dumped (Day 37)	
Lakeyn	Not in Villa										Bennett	Carrington & Laurel to dump	Dumped (Day 37)	
Julia	Not in Villa										Single	Dumped (Day 33)		
Kierstan	Not in Villa		Carrington	Carrington	Carrington	Vulnerable	Single	Calvin	Safe	Bennett	Single	Dumped (Day 33)		
Bennie	Not in Villa									Single	Dumped (Day 29)			
Connor	Mackenzie		Mackenzie	Mackenzie	Mackenzie	Saved	Single	Moira	Safe	Single	Dumped (Day 29)			
Noah	Not in Villa									Removed (Day 28)				
Aaron	Not in Villa						Moira	Mackenzie	Vulnerable	Dumped (Day 25)				
Jalen	Not in Villa						Mackenzie	Sher	Vulnerable	Dumped (Day 25)				
Mackenzie	Connor		Connor	Connor	Connor	Saved	Jalen	Aaron	Vulnerable	Dumped (Day 25)				
Sher	Not in Villa						Calvin	Jalen	Vulnerable	Dumped (Day 25)				
De'Andre	Not in Villa						Single	Dumped (Day 19)						
Faith	Not in Villa						Single	Dumped (Day 19)						
GiNiele	Not in Villa						Single	Dumped (Day 19)						
Mercades	Not in Villa						Single	Dumped (Day 19)						
Mike	Not in Villa						Single	Dumped (Day 19)						
Pat	Not in Villa						Single	Dumped (Day 19)						
Tre	Cely	Single	Justine	Justine	Lauren	Vulnerable	Dumped (Day 14)							
Lauren	Not in Villa				Tre	Vulnerable	Dumped (Day 14)							
Rachel	Not in Villa		Jeremiah	Caleb	Single	Dumped (Day 12)								
James	Moira		Moira	Single	Dumped (Day 9)									
Jeremiah	Justine		Rachel	Single	Dumped (Day 9)									
Kaitlynn	Carrington		Single	Dumped (Day 5)										
Notes	1		none			2	3	none	4	none			5	
Removed	none									Noah	none			
Dumped	No; Dumping		Kaitlynn; Failed to couple up	James, Jeremiah; Failed to couple up	Rachel; Failed to couple up	Lauren; Boys' choice to dump	De'Andre, Faith, GiNiele, Mercades, Mike, Pat; Failed to couple up	No; Dumping	Mackenzie, Sher; Boys' choice to dump	Bennie, Connor; Failed to couple up	Julia, Kierstan; Failed to couple up	Bennett & Lakeyn; 3 of 5 votes to dump	Carrington & Laurel; Fewest votes to win	
Dumped	No; Dumping		Kaitlynn; Failed to couple up	James, Jeremiah; Failed to couple up	Rachel; Failed to couple up	Lauren; Boys' choice to dump	De'Andre, Faith, GiNiele, Mercades, Mike, Pat; Failed to couple up	No; Dumping	Mackenzie, Sher; Boys' choice to dump	Bennie, Connor; Failed to couple up	Julia, Kierstan; Failed to couple up	Bennett & Lakeyn; 3 of 5 votes to dump	Calvin & Moira; Third–most votes to win	
Dumped	No; Dumping		Kaitlynn; Failed to couple up	James, Jeremiah; Failed to couple up	Rachel; Failed to couple up	Tre; Girls' choice to dump	De'Andre, Faith, GiNiele, Mercades, Mike, Pat; Failed to couple up	No; Dumping	Aaron, Jalen; Girls' choice to dump	Bennie, Connor; Failed to couple up	Julia, Kierstan; Failed to couple up	Bennett & Lakeyn; 3 of 5 votes to dump	Cely & Johnny; Second–most votes to win	
Dumped	No; Dumping		Kaitlynn; Failed to couple up	James, Jeremiah; Failed to couple up	Rachel; Failed to couple up	Tre; Girls' choice to dump	De'Andre, Faith, GiNiele, Mercades, Mike, Pat; Failed to couple up	No; Dumping	Aaron, Jalen; Girls' choice to dump	Bennie, Connor; Failed to couple up	Julia, Kierstan; Failed to couple up	Bennett & Lakeyn; 3 of 5 votes to dump	Caleb & Justine; Most votes to win	

=== Notes ===
- ^Note 1: Johnny entered after the initial coupling and was told that after twenty-four hours he'd be allowed to steal a girl from another guy.
- ^Note 2: America voted for the most compatible couples, with the three couples with the most votes being safe. The 3 saved couples then had to collectively save one more couple. The saved couples saved Connor & Mackenzie, leaving Kierstan & Carrington, and Lauren & Tre vulnerable. The four saved boys then had to decide which vulnerable woman to dump from the villa, choosing Lauren, and the 4 saved girls had to decide which vulnerable man to dump from the villa, choosing Tre.
- ^Note 3: As the final part for the Casa Amor twist in week 3, Casa Amor and the villa held two separate re-coupling ceremonies for the original islanders to choose whether to return to their previous partner or pick any new partner. Any of the 10 new islanders that remained single by the end of either ceremony was dumped from the villa. However, if one of the 10 original islanders remained single at the end of both ceremonies, they would still remain in the villa, but as a single islander. De'Andre, GiNiele, Faith, Mercades, Mike, and Pat remained single at the end the night, and were all dumped from the villa.
- ^Note 4: America voted for the most compatible couples, with the four couples with the most votes being safe. The boys from the 4 saved couples then had to collectively save one more girl and the saved girls had to save one more boy. The boys saved Laurel and the girls saved Carrington.
- ^Note 5: America voted for which couple they think should win Love Island. The couple with the most votes were declared the winners of Love Island and received the grand prize money.

== Episodes ==
No. overall	No. in season	Title	Day(s)	Original release date	Prod. code	US viewers (millions)	Rating (18–49)
Week 1
23	1	"Episode 1"	Days 1–2	August 24, 2020	201	1.89	0.4
24	2	"Episode 2"	Days 2–3	August 25, 2020	202	1.48	
25	3	"Episode 3"	Days 4–5	August 27, 2020	203	1.47	0.4
26	4	"Episode 4"	Days 5–6	August 28, 2020	204	1.47	0.3
27	5	"Episode 5"	Days 6–7	August 29, 2020	205	0.70	0.1
Week 2
28	6	"Episode 6"	Days 7–8	August 30, 2020	206	1.39	0.2
29	7	"Episode 7"	Days 8–9	August 31, 2020	207	1.58	0.3
30	8	"Episode 8"	Days 9–10	September 1, 2020	208	1.70	0.4
31	9	"Episode 9"	Days 10–11	September 3, 2020	209	1.56	0.4
32	10	"Episode 10"	Days 11–12	September 4, 2020	210	1.58	0.3
33	11	"Episode 11"	Days 12–13	September 5, 2020	211	0.70	0.1
Week 3
34	12	"Episode 12"	Days 13–14	September 6, 2020	212	1.61	0.4
35	13	"Episode 13"	Days 14–15	September 7, 2020	213	1.63	0.3
36	14	"Episode 14"	Day 16	September 8, 2020	214	1.69	0.4
37	15	"Episode 15"	Days 16–17	September 9, 2020	215	1.66	0.4
38	16	"Episode 16"	Days 17–18	September 10, 2020	216	1.66	0.4
39	17	"Episode 17"	Days 18–19	September 11, 2020	217	1.81	0.5
40	18	"Episode 18"	Day 19	September 12, 2020	218	0.81	0.1
Week 4
41	19	"Episode 19"	Days 19–20	September 13, 2020	219	1.77	0.5
42	20	"Episode 20"	Days 21–22	September 14, 2020	220	1.66	0.4
43	21	"Episode 21"	Days 22–23	September 15, 2020	221	1.92	0.5
44	22	"Episode 22"	Days 23–26	September 17, 2020	222	1.78	0.4
45	23	"Episode 23"	Days 26–27	September 18, 2020	223	1.58	0.3
46	24	"Episode 24"	Day 27	September 19, 2020	224	0.90	0.1
Week 5
47	25	"Episode 25"	Days 27–29	September 20, 2020	225	1.91	0.5
48	26	"Episode 26"	Days 29–30	September 21, 2020	226	1.82	0.5
49	27	"Episode 27"	Days 30–31	September 22, 2020	227	1.85	0.5
50	28	"Episode 28"	Days 31–32	September 23, 2020	228	1.86	0.6
51	29	"Episode 29"	Days 32–33	September 24, 2020	229	1.87	0.7
52	30	"Episode 30"	Days 33–35	September 25, 2020	230	1.85	0.4
Week 6
53	31	"Episode 31"	Day 36	September 27, 2020	231	1.71	0.4
54	32	"Episode 32"	Days 36–37	September 28, 2020	232	1.77	0.4
55	33	"Episode 33"	Days 37–38	September 29, 2020	233	2.48	0.6
56	34	"Episode 34"	Day 38	September 30, 2020	234	2.03	0.5

== Viewing figures ==
Viewership and ratings per episode of Love Island USA season 2
No.	Title	Air date	Timeslot (ET)	Rating (18–49)	Viewers (millions)	DVR (18–49)	DVR viewers (millions)	Total (18–49)	Total viewers (millions)	Ref.
1	"Episode 1"	August 24, 2020	Monday 8:00 p.m.	0.4	1.89	TBD	TBD	TBD	TBD	
2	"Episode 2"	August 25, 2020	Tuesday 9:00 p.m.	0.3	1.48	TBD	TBD	TBD	TBD	
3	"Episode 3"	August 27, 2020	Thursday 9:00 p.m.	0.4	1.47	TBD	TBD	TBD	TBD	
4	"Episode 4"	August 28, 2020	Friday 9:00 p.m.	0.3	1.47	TBD	TBD	TBD	TBD	
5	"Episode 5"	August 29, 2020	Saturday 8:00 p.m.	0.1	0.70	TBD	TBD	TBD	TBD	
6	"Episode 6"	August 30, 2020	Sunday 9:00 p.m.	0.2	1.39	TBD	TBD	TBD	TBD	
7	"Episode 7"	August 31, 2020	Monday 9:00 p.m.	0.3	1.58	TBD	TBD	TBD	TBD	
8	"Episode 8"	September 1, 2020	Tuesday 9:00 p.m.	0.4	1.70	TBD	TBD	TBD	TBD	
9	"Episode 9"	September 3, 2020	Thursday 9:00 p.m.	0.4	1.56	TBD	TBD	TBD	TBD	
10	"Episode 10"	September 4, 2020	Friday 9:00 p.m.	0.3	1.58	TBD	TBD	TBD	TBD	
11	"Episode 11"	September 5, 2020	Saturday 8:00 p.m.	0.1	0.70	TBD	TBD	TBD	TBD	
12	"Episode 12"	September 6, 2020	Sunday 9:00 p.m.	0.4	1.61	TBD	TBD	TBD	TBD	
13	"Episode 13"	September 7, 2020	Monday 9:00 p.m.	0.3	1.63	TBD	TBD	TBD	TBD	
14	"Episode 14"	September 8, 2020	Tuesday 9:00 p.m.	0.4	1.69	TBD	TBD	TBD	TBD	
15	"Episode 15"	September 9, 2020	Wednesday 9:00 p.m.	0.4	1.66	TBD	TBD	TBD	TBD	
16	"Episode 16"	September 10, 2020	Thursday 9:00 p.m.	0.4	1.66	TBD	TBD	TBD	TBD	
17	"Episode 17"	September 11, 2020	Friday 9:00 p.m.	0.5	1.81	TBD	TBD	TBD	TBD	
18	"Episode 18"	September 12, 2020	Saturday 9:00 p.m.	0.1	0.81	TBD	TBD	TBD	TBD	
19	"Episode 19"	September 13, 2020	Sunday 9:00 p.m.	0.5	1.78	TBD	TBD	TBD	TBD	
20	"Episode 20"	September 14, 2020	Monday 9:00 p.m.	0.4	1.66	TBD	TBD	TBD	TBD	
21	"Episode 21"	September 15, 2020	Tuesday 9:00 p.m.	0.5	1.92	TBD	TBD	TBD	TBD	
22	"Episode 22"	September 17, 2020	Thursday 9:00 p.m.	0.4	1.77	TBD	TBD	TBD	TBD	
23	"Episode 23"	September 18, 2020	Friday 9:00 p.m.	0.3	1.58	TBD	TBD	TBD	TBD	
24	"Episode 24"	September 19, 2020	Saturday 9:00 p.m.	0.1	0.90	TBD	TBD	TBD	TBD	
25	"Episode 25"	September 20, 2020	Sunday 9:30 p.m.	0.5	1.91	TBD	TBD	TBD	TBD	
26	"Episode 26"	September 21, 2020	Monday 9:00 p.m.	0.5	1.82	0.2	0.50	0.7	2.32	
27	"Episode 27"	September 22, 2020	Tuesday 9:00 p.m.	0.5	1.85	0.2	0.50	0.7	2.37	
28	"Episode 28"	September 23, 2020	Wednesday 9:00 p.m.	0.6	1.86	0.2	0.58	0.8	2.45	
29	"Episode 29"	September 24, 2020	Thursday 9:00 p.m.	0.5	1.87	0.3	0.65	0.8	2.53	
30	"Episode 30"	September 25, 2020	Friday 9:00 p.m.	0.4	1.85	0.3	0.62	0.7	2.48	
31	"Episode 31"	September 27, 2020	Sunday 9:00 p.m.	0.4	1.71	0.2	0.56	0.6	2.29	
32	"Episode 32"	September 28, 2020	Monday 9:00 p.m.	0.4	1.77	0.2	0.52	0.6	2.30	
33	"Episode 33"	September 29, 2020	Tuesday 8:00 p.m.	0.6	2.48	0.2	0.43	0.8	2.92	
34	"Episode 34"	September 30, 2020	Wednesday 9:00 p.m.	0.5	2.03	0.2	0.50	0.7	2.53	
