= Toby Aromolaran =

English footballer and television personality (born 1999)

Personal information
- Full name: Tobias Ademide Aromolaran
- Date of birth: 3 March 1999 (age 27)
- Height: 5 ft 11 in (1.80 m)
- Position: Forward

Team information
- Current team: Aveley

Youth career
- –2016: Thurrock

Senior career*
| Years | Team | Apps | (Gls) |
| 2016–2018 | Tilbury | 82 | (15) |
| 2017–2018 | Loughborough University | 5 | (1) |
| 2018 | Basildon United | 2 | (0) |
| 2018 | Cheshunt | 3 | (0) |
| 2018–2019 | Witham Town | 16 | (3) |
| 2019 | Tilbury | 10 | (1) |
| 2019–2020 | Coalville Town | 2+ | (1) |
| 2020–2025 | Hashtag United | 126 | (24) |
| 2025– | Aveley | 22 | (7) |
- * Club domestic league appearances and goals as of 14:41, 4 May 2026 (UTC)

Tobias Ademide Aromolaran (born 3 March 1999) is an English television personality and semi-professional footballer, who plays as a forward for Isthmian League club Aveley. In 2021, he was runner-up on the seventh series of Love Island, and has since appeared on the spin-off versions; Love Island Games and Love Island: All-Stars, as well as the first series of Celeb Cooking School.

== Club career ==
=== Youth career ===
==== Thurrock ====
Aromolaran, having initially started playing football at the age of 6, is a product of the Thurrock youth ranks, where he played at U18 and U23 level.

=== Senior career ===
==== Tilbury ====
In mid-2016, Aromolaran moved into the senior set-up of Isthmian League - North Division side Tilbury. His competitive bow arrived on 13 August 2016 in a league match with former team Thurrock, as he made it a goalscoring debut after netting the opener in a 1–1 home draw. Further appearances came that month against Ware, his FA Cup debut against Brentwood Town, and then back in the league against Great Wakering Rovers. In mid-September, Aromolaran scored his second senior goal in a 3–2 Isthmian League win at home to Maldon & Tiptree. He ended the campaign with 40 appearances and 3 goals; the third came on 25 October versus future team Witham Town.

Aromolaran started his second season at Tilbury with 4 goals in 5 matches, as he got goals against Bury Town and Norwich United before notching a brace in a 6–4 win away to Mildenhall Town. After an 8th goal for Tilbury against AFC Sudbury on 11 November 2017, he netted braces in consecutive December appearances versus Potters Bar Town and Romford respectively; in the match with Potters Bar, he picked up his first career yellow card. Three more goals came in home encounters against Barking, Ware and Maldon & Tiptree. In 2018–19, Aromolaran featured five times before departing.

As a Tilbury player, Aromolaran featured at centre-back, for the Essex FA county team.

==== Loughborough University ====
Whilst with Tilbury, Aromolaran occasionally participated for Midland League team Loughborough University. He appeared in 5 total matches for The Scholars and scored 1 goal, which came in a fixture at home to Coleshill Town at the Loughborough University Stadium on 18 November 2017.

==== Basildon United ====
After leaving Tilbury, Aromolaran began playing for Basildon United of the Isthmian League - North Division in October 2018. His stay with the club would be short-lived, as he totalled around 63 minutes after coming off the bench in league defeats away to Aveley on 19 October and at home to Bowers & Pitsea on 3 November.

==== Cheshunt ====
Aromolaran switched Basildon United for Cheshunt in November 2018. Like with his former team, the player would struggle for consistency and would leave after just a few appearances. He made his debut in the Isthmian League - South Central Division on 10 November as a starter in their 3–1 defeat on the road to Hanwell Town. Aromolaran would leave after participating in the Alan Turvey Trophy against Whitstable Town on 13 November and in the league against Chipstead on 17 November.

==== Witham Town ====
On 11 December 2018, Witham Town announced the signing of Aromolaran. Four days later, the forward appeared for his debut in an Isthmian League - North Division victory away against Canvey Island; replacing Johnny Ashman after 74 minutes. His first goal for The Town came in a 2–1 win over Brentwood Town on 5 January 2019. A month later, on 5 February, Aromolaran scored twice in a 5–2 loss away to Bury Town at Ram Meadow. He'd participate in a total of 16 games for Witham.

==== Tilbury return ====
In mid-2019, Aromolaran re-joined Isthmian League - North Division club Tilbury. His second competitive debut for The Dockers came on 17 August during a home defeat to Cambridge City, as he came onto the pitch after 37 minutes to replace Jordan Cox. He netted his only Tilbury goal of his second stint in his penultimate appearance, as he notched the final goal of a three-goal win on the road against ex-team Basildon United. Aromolaran departed after a last showing in an FA Cup defeat away to Biggleswade F.C. on 7 September.

==== Coalville Town ====
A short spell with Coalville Town in the Southern League Premier Division Central followed Aromolaran's stint back with Tilbury. He scored his only goal for Coalville on 1 October in a first round Southern League Cup against Tamworth He made a few other appearances before departing at around the time of the start of the COVID-19 pandemic.

==== Hashtag United ====
===== 2020–21 =====
On 31 July 2020, Hashtag United F.C revealed the signing of Aromolaran. His first appearance came in a pre-season friendly win day later against Frenford, which preceded his first goal coming in an exhibition defeat a week later versus Bowers & Pitsea. Another friendly goal came against St Albans City, before the new signing netted his first competitive goal in his first competitive appearance for HTU as they won on their FA Cup bow versus Park View on 2 September. A first Essex Senior League goal arrived three days later versus Ilford on 5 September, a month that he ended by grabbing his first HTU assist in a loss at Wadham Lodge to Walthamstow on 29 September.

A fifth goal for The Tags came on 3 October in an FA Cup second qualifying round match with Braintree Town, as the forward netted from range to put HTU ahead in stoppage time. However, the club immediately conceded and were later eliminated via a penalty shoot-out. Soon after, the season was curtailed due to the COVID-19 pandemic; though this time, unlike in early 2020, HTU would end up claiming promotion to the Isthmian League - North Division.

===== 2021–22 =====
Aromolaran missed pre-season in 2021–22 due to his appearance on the seventh series of Love Island. Whilst away, Jay Devereux publicly left the door open for the player to return and continue with Hashtag United following the end of his stint on the show. Aromolaran returned to first-team action for an Isthmian League, North Division home defeat to Felixstowe & Walton United on 18 September, as he came off the bench to replace Kiernan Hughes-Mason with 17 minutes remaining. His opening 2021–22 goal arrived on 4 December 2021 against Great Wakering Rovers in the league, as he also grabbed an assist for Luke Hirst. He also notched versus Dereham Town and Romford in that December, which were his final competitive goals in that campaign.

===== 2022–23 =====
Having netted in pre-season friendlies against Cray Wanderers, Buckhurst Hill and Brightlingsea Regent, Aromolaran got his first official strike for HTU since December 2021 in an August 2022 cup win over Barton Rovers on 20 August. The forward scored his first of the Isthmian League, North Division campaign against Hullbridge Sports on 4 November, prior to netting 3 goals in December versus Great Wakering Rovers, Gorleston and Brentwood Town. Aromolaran opened 2023 with January goals at East Thurrock United and at home to Hullbridge Sports. He scored his 20th goal for HTU on 18 February as they beat New Salamis 2–1 on the road and his 21st goal four days later in a Coggeshall Town.

===== 2023–24 =====
On the opening day of the Isthmian League, Premier Division campaign in 2023–24, Aromolaran netted a 94th-minute leveller during a 2–2 home draw with Dulwich Hamlet. In his following appearance, on matchday 2, the forward converted again in a triumph at Concord Rangers. Aromolaran scored twice in a 7–0 victory away to a weakened Hornchurch side on 21 November in the 3rd round of the Essex Senior Cup. His 5th goal of the campaign was netted in a 3–1 league success over Canvey Island on 2 December.

===== 2025–26 =====
After 5 seasons at Hashtag United, having become one of their most prolific players, it was announced that Toby would leave for Aveley mid way through the season. He ended his stint at Hashtag with 37 goals and 47 assists. He saw 2 promotions with the Tags.

== Television ==
In 2021, Aromolaran was announced as a contestant on the seventh series of Love Island, entering the villa as an original islander on Day 1. He reached the final and alongside Chloe Burrows and the pair finished in second place. In 2022, Aromolaran was a contestant on the first series of the E4 reality series Celeb Cooking School in which he finished as the runner-up. He also took part in the Channel 4 series The Big Celebrity Detox. In 2023, he took part in season one of Love Island Games. In 2024, Aromolaran was announced to be returning for Love Island: All-Stars. In 2025, he returned for season two of Love Island Games. In 2026 he took part on the dating show Celebrity Ex on the Beach series 4.

== Personal life ==
Aromolaran is the son of a Nigerian father and Irish mother, who is originally from Crossmolina, County Mayo. He was in a relationship with Chloe Burrows, whom he met on Love Island until October 2022.
