= Love Island USA season 3 =

2021 season of Love Island USA

Love Island USA
- Season 3
- Promotional poster for the season
- Hosted by: Arielle Vandenberg
- No. of days: 40
- No. of contestants: 34
- Winners: Korey Gandy; Olivia Kaiser
- Runners-up: Kyra Lizama; Will Moncada
- Companion shows: Love Island: The Drop; Love Island: Laid Bare
- No. of episodes: 29

Release
- Original network: CBS
- Original release: July 7 – August 15, 2021

Season chronology
- ← Previous; Season 2 Next → Season 4

The third season of the American version of the television reality program Love Island premiered on CBS in the United States and CTV in Canada on July 7, 2021. Arielle Vandenberg returned to host the series while Matthew Hoffman provided voice-over narration. The season was filmed in a villa located in Nīnole, Hawaii.

It was the final season of Love Island to be aired on CBS before the series moved to Peacock in 2022.

== Format ==
Love Island is a reality television program in which a group of contestants, who are referred to as "Islanders", are living in a villa in Hawaii. The Islanders are cut off from the outside world and are under constant video surveillance. To survive in the villa, the Islanders must be in a relationship with another Islander. The Islanders couple up for the first time on first impressions but they are later forced to "re-couple" at special ceremonies in which they can choose to remain with their current partners or to switch partners. At the villa, the couples must share a bed for sleeping and are permitted to talk with other Islanders at any time, allowing them to get to know everyone. While in the villa, each Islander has his or her own telephone, with which they can contact other Islanders via text and can receive text messages informing them of the latest challenges, dumpings, and re-couplings. While the Islanders might appear to have unmediated access to the outside world, they are limited in both their alcohol consumption and communication with the outside world.

The Islanders are presented with many games and challenges that are designed to test their physical and mental abilities, after which the winners are sometimes presented with special prizes, such as a night at the Hideaway or a special date.

Islanders can be eliminated, or "dumped", for several reasons; these include remaining single after a re-coupling and by public vote through the Love Island mobile app. During the show's final week, members of the public vote to decide which couple should win the series; the couple who receive the most votes win.

At the envelope ceremony on finale night, the couple who received the highest number of votes from the public receive two envelopes, one for each partner. One envelope contains $100,000 and the other contains nothing. The partner with the $100,000 envelope may choose whether to share the money with his or her partner as a test of trust and commitment.

== Islanders ==
The initial Islanders were revealed June 29, 2021. Initially, Tony "Ballo" Caraballo was announced as part of the cast entering for the Casa Amor twist, but was replaced by Kamryn "Kam" Mickens-Bennett the next day.

Leslie Gordon was removed from the villa on Day 24 for breaking production guidelines.

Islander	Age	Residence	Entered	Exited	Status	Ref
Korey Gandy	28	Virginia Beach, Virginia	Day 1	Day 40	Winner	
Olivia Kaiser	28	Anchorage, Alaska	Day 1	Day 40	Winner	
Kyra Lizama	23	Honolulu, Hawaii	Day 1	Day 40	Runner-up	
Will Moncada	26	Medellín, Colombia (Note: Will Moncada is originally from Medellín in Colombia but was residing in the United States at the time of casting and filming.)	Day 1	Day 40	Runner-up	
Bailey Marshall	23	Portland, Oregon	Day 26	Day 40	Third place	
Jeremy Hershberg	27	New York, New York	Day 1	Day 40	Third place	
Alana Paolucci	28	Buffalo, New York / Manhattan, New York	Day 26	Day 40	Fourth place	
Charlie Lynch	30	Houston, Texas	Day 19	Day 40	Fourth place	
Andre Brunelli	28	Jacksonville, Florida	Day 30	Day 38	Dumped	
Trina Njoroge	25	Hacienda Heights, California	Day 1	Day 38	Dumped	
Elly Steffen	22	Chicago, Illinois	Day 26	Day 34	Dumped	
K-Ci Maultsby	27	Atlanta, Georgia	Day 30	Day 34	Dumped	
Cashay Proudfoot	25	Brooklyn, New York	Day 1	Day 32	Dumped	
Josh Goldstein	24	Haverhill, Massachusetts	Day 1	Day 31	Walked	
Shannon St. Clair	25	Warminster, Pennsylvania	Day 1	Day 31	Walked	
Genevieve Shawcross	22	West Chester, Pennsylvania	Day 19	Day 25	Dumped	
Melvin "Cinco" Holland, Jr.	25	Ashburn, Virginia	Day 1	Day 25	Dumped	
Leslie Golden	24	Redwater, Texas	Day 19	Day 24	Removed	
Florence "Flo" Mueller	26	Miami, Florida	Day 19	Day 22	Dumped	
Isabel Johnson	21	Minneapolis, Minnesota	Day 19	Day 22	Dumped	
Kay Taylor	24	Calabasas, California	Day 19	Day 22	Dumped	
Andrew John Phillips	28	Fort Lauderdale, Florida	Day 19	Day 22	Dumped	
Gabe Sadowsky	27	Nashua, New Hampshire	Day 19	Day 22	Dumped	
Kamryn "Kam" Mickens-Bennett	25	Summit, New Jersey	Day 19	Day 22	Dumped	
Raul Frias	24	Hialeah, Florida	Day 19	Day 22	Dumped	
Javonny Vega	26	Boca Raton, Florida	Day 1	Day 17	Dumped	
Wes Ogsbury	24	Denver, Colorado	Day 12	Day 17	Dumped	
Aimee Flores	26	Los Angeles, California	Day 3	Day 17	Dumped	
Florita Diaz	27	Miami, Florida	Day 8	Day 17	Dumped	
Isaiah Harmison	25	Appleton, Wisconsin	Day 6	Day 15	Dumped	
Slade Parker	27	Rome, Georgia	Day 12	Day 14	Walked	
Lei-Yen Rapp	28	Houston, Texas	Day 8	Day 11	Dumped	
Roxy Ahmad	24	Croydon, United Kingdom (Note: Roxy Ahmad is originally from Croydon, England in the United Kingdom but was residing in Scottsdale, Arizona at the time of casting and filming.)	Day 8	Day 11	Dumped	
Christian Longnecker	24	Oahu, Hawaii	Day 1	Day 5	Dumped	

=== Future appearances ===
Trina Njoroge competed on the Paramount+ original series All Star Shore. Cashay Proudfoot, Javonny Vega, Melvin "Cinco" Holland, Jr. and Shannon St. Clair competed on The Challenge: USA. Olivia Kaiser competed on seasons 38, 39, 40, and 41 of The Challenge.

In 2025, Josh Goldstein competed on season two of Love Island Games.

In 2026, Kyra Lizama appeared on series three of Love Island: All Stars. Goldstein will compete on season 42 of The Challenge.

== Coupling and elimination history ==
	Week 1			Week 2	Week 3		Week 4		Week 5		Week 6		
	Day 1	Day 2	Day 5	Day 11	Day 15	Day 17	Day 22	Day 25	Day 32	Day 34	Day 38	Final	
Korey	Kyra	Single	Trina	Florita	Cashay	Safe	Leslie	Safe	Olivia	Safe	Andre & Trina to dump	Split the 100k	Winner (Day 40)
Olivia	Javonny		Javonny	Javonny	Javonny	Vulnerable	Single	Safe	Korey	Safe	Andre & Trina to dump	Winner (Day 40)	
Kyra	Korey	Will	Will	Will	Will	Safe	Will	Vulnerable	Will	Safe	Andre & Trina to dump	Runner-up (Day 40)	
Will	Single	Kyra	Kyra	Kyra	Kyra	Safe	Kyra	Vulnerable	Kyra	Safe	Andre & Trina to dump	Runner-up (Day 40)	
Bailey	Not in Villa								Jeremy	Saved	Andre & Trina to dump	Third place (Day 40)	
Jeremy	Trina		Aimee	Aimee	Florita	Vulnerable	Genevieve	Saved	Bailey	Saved	Andre & Trina to dump	Third place (Day 40)	
Alana	Not in Villa								Charlie	Vulnerable	Andre & Trina to dump	Fourth place (Day 40)	
Charlie	Not in Villa						Cashay	Safe	Alana	Vulnerable	Andre & Trina to dump	Fourth place (Day 40)	
Andre	Not in Villa								Trina	Safe	Alana & Charlie to dump	Dumped (Day 38)	
Trina	Jeremy		Korey	Cinco	Cinco	Saved	Cinco	Saved	Andre	Safe	Alana & Charlie to dump	Dumped (Day 38)	
Elly	Not in Villa								K-Ci	Vulnerable	Dumped (Day 34)		
K-Ci	Not in Villa								Elly	Vulnerable	Dumped (Day 34)		
Cashay	Christian	Cinco	Cinco	Isaiah	Korey	Safe	Charlie	Safe	Single	Dumped (Day 32)			
Josh	Shannon		Shannon	Shannon	Shannon	Safe	Shannon	Safe	Walked (Day 31)				
Shannon	Josh		Josh	Josh	Josh	Safe	Josh	Safe	Walked (Day 31)				
Cinco	Single	Cashay	Cashay	Trina	Trina	Saved	Trina	Vulnerable	Dumped (Day 25)				
Genevieve	Not in Villa						Jeremy	Vulnerable	Dumped (Day 25)				
Leslie	Not in Villa						Korey	Removed (Day 24)					
Andrew	Not in Villa						Single	Dumped (Day 22)					
Flo	Not in Villa						Single	Dumped (Day 22)					
Gabe	Not in Villa						Single	Dumped (Day 22)					
Isabel	Not in Villa						Single	Dumped (Day 22)					
Kam	Not in Villa						Single	Dumped (Day 22)					
Kay	Not in Villa						Single	Dumped (Day 22)					
Raul	Not in Villa						Single	Dumped (Day 22)					
Aimee	Not in Villa		Jeremy	Jeremy	Wes	Vulnerable	Dumped (Day 17)						
Florita	Not in Villa			Korey	Jeremy	Vulnerable	Dumped (Day 17)						
Javonny	Olivia		Olivia	Olivia	Olivia	Vulnerable	Dumped (Day 17)						
Wes	Not in Villa				Aimee	Vulnerable	Dumped (Day 17)						
Isaiah	Not in Villa			Cashay	Single	Dumped (Day 15)							
Slade	Not in Villa				Walked (Day 14)								
Lei-Yen	Not in Villa			Single	Dumped (Day 11)								
Roxy	Not in Villa			Single	Dumped (Day 11)								
Christian	Cashay	Single		Dumped (Day 5)									
Notes	1		none			2	3	4	none	5	none	6	
Walked	none				Slade	none			Josh, Shannon	none			
Removed	none							Leslie	none				
Dumped	No; Dumping		Christian; Failed to couple up	Lei-Yen, Roxy; Failed to couple up	Isaiah; Failed to couple up	Aimee, Florita; Boys' choice to dump	Andrew, Flo, Gabe, Isabel, Kam, Kay, Raul; Failed to couple up	Cinco; Girls' choice to dump	Cashay; Failed to couple up	Elly & K-Ci; Islanders’ choice to dump	Andre & Trina; 4 of 5 votes to dump	Alana & Charlie; Fewest votes to win	
Dumped	No; Dumping		Christian; Failed to couple up	Lei-Yen, Roxy; Failed to couple up	Isaiah; Failed to couple up	Aimee, Florita; Boys' choice to dump	Andrew, Flo, Gabe, Isabel, Kam, Kay, Raul; Failed to couple up	Cinco; Girls' choice to dump	Cashay; Failed to couple up	Elly & K-Ci; Islanders’ choice to dump	Andre & Trina; 4 of 5 votes to dump	Bailey & Jeremy; Third–most votes to win	
Dumped	No; Dumping		Christian; Failed to couple up	Lei-Yen, Roxy; Failed to couple up	Isaiah; Failed to couple up	Javonny, Wes; Girls' choice to dump	Andrew, Flo, Gabe, Isabel, Kam, Kay, Raul; Failed to couple up	Genevieve; Boys' choice to dump	Cashay; Failed to couple up	Elly & K-Ci; Islanders’ choice to dump	Andre & Trina; 4 of 5 votes to dump	Kyra & Will; Second–most votes to win	
Dumped	No; Dumping		Christian; Failed to couple up	Lei-Yen, Roxy; Failed to couple up	Isaiah; Failed to couple up	Javonny, Wes; Girls' choice to dump	Andrew, Flo, Gabe, Isabel, Kam, Kay, Raul; Failed to couple up	Genevieve; Boys' choice to dump	Cashay; Failed to couple up	Elly & K-Ci; Islanders’ choice to dump	Andre & Trina; 4 of 5 votes to dump	Korey & Olivia; Most votes to win	

=== Notes ===
- ^Note 1: Cinco and Will entered after the initial coupling and were told that after twenty-four hours they'd be allowed to steal a girl from another guy.
- ^Note 2: America voted for the most compatible couples, with the three couples with the most votes being safe. The 3 saved couples then had to collectively save one more couple. The saved couples saved Cinco & Trina, leaving Aimee & Wes, Florita & Jeremy, and Olivia & Javonny vulnerable. The four saved boys then had to decide which vulnerable woman to save, choosing Olivia, and the 4 saved girls had to decide which vulnerable man to save, choosing Jeremy.
- ^Note 3: As the final part for the Casa Amor twist in week 4, Casa Amor and the villa held two separate re-coupling ceremonies for the original islanders to choose whether to return to their previous partner or pick any new partner. Any of the 10 new islanders that remained single by the end of either ceremony was dumped from the villa. However, if one of the 10 original islanders remained single at the end of both ceremonies, they would still remain in the villa, but as a single islander. Andrew, Flo, Gabe, Isabel, Kam, Kay, and Raul remained single at the end the night, and were all dumped from the villa.
- ^Note 4: America voted for their favorite girl and boy islanders, with the three girls and three boys with the most votes being safe. The 6 saved islanders then had to collectively save one more girl and boy islander. The saved girls saved Trina, while the saved boys saved Jeremy, leaving Cinco, Genevieve, Kyra, and Will vulnerable. The four saved girls then had to decide which vulnerable man to save, choosing Will, and the 4 saved boys had to decide which vulnerable woman to save, choosing Kyra.
- ^Note 5: America voted for the couple with most potential, with the three couples with the most votes being safe. The 3 safe couples then had to collectively save one more couple. The safe couples saved Bailey & Jeremy, leaving Alana & Charlie and Elly & K-Ci vulnerable. The four safe couples then had to decide which vulnerable couple to save, choosing Alana & Charlie.
- ^Note 6: America voted for which couple they think should win Love Island. The couple with the most votes were declared the winners of Love Island and received the grand prize money.

== Episodes ==
No. overall	No. in season	Title	Day(s)	Original release date	Prod. code	US viewers (millions)	Rating (18–49)
Week 1
57	1	"Episode 1"	Day 1	July 7, 2021	301	1.86	0.5
58	2	"Episode 2"	Days 1–2	July 8, 2021	302	1.71	0.4
59	3	"Episode 3"	Days 2–3	July 9, 2021	303	1.53	0.3
60	4	"Episode 4"	Days 3–5	July 11, 2021	304	1.38	0.3
Week 2
61	5	"Episode 5"	Days 5–7	July 13, 2021	305	1.72	0.3
62	6	"Episode 6"	Days 7–8	July 14, 2021	306	1.69	0.3
63	7	"Episode 7"	Days 8–9	July 15, 2021	307	1.71	0.4
64	8	"Episode 8"	Days 9–11	July 16, 2021	308	1.66	0.3
65	9	"Episode 9"	Days 11–13	July 18, 2021	309	1.47	0.4
Week 3
66	10	"Episode 10"	Days 13–15	July 20, 2021	310	1.66	0.3
67	11	"Episode 11"	Days 15–16	July 21, 2021	311	1.64	0.4
68	12	"Episode 12"	Days 16–17	July 22, 2021	312	1.86	0.4
69	13	"Episode 13"	Days 17–18	July 23, 2021	313	1.47	0.3
Week 4
70	14	"Episode 14"	Days 18–19	July 25, 2021	314	1.34	0.3
71	15	"Episode 15"	Days 20–21	July 27, 2021	315	1.66	0.4
72	16	"Episode 16"	Days 21–22	July 28, 2021	316	1.89	0.5
73	17	"Episode 17"	Days 22–24	July 29, 2021	317	1.78	0.4
74	18	"Episode 18"	Day 24	July 30, 2021	318	1.54	0.3
Week 5
75	19	"Episode 19"	Days 24–26	August 1, 2021	319	1.57	0.4
76	20	"Episode 20"	Days 26–27	August 3, 2021	320	1.82	0.4
77	21	"Episode 21"	Days 27–29	August 4, 2021	321	1.72	0.4
78	22	"Episode 22"	Days 30–31	August 5, 2021	322	1.78	0.4
79	23	"Episode 23"	Days 31–32	August 6, 2021	323	1.60	0.3
Week 6
80	24	"Episode 24"	Days 32–34	August 8, 2021	324	1.67	0.4
81	25	"Episode 25"	Day 35	August 10, 2021	325	1.66	0.3
82	26	"Episode 26"	Day 36	August 11, 2021	326	1.73	0.4
83	27	"Episode 27"	Days 36–38	August 12, 2021	327	1.86	0.4
84	28	"Episode 28"	Day 39	August 13, 2021	328	1.43	0.3
85	29	"Episode 29"	Day 40	August 15, 2021	329	1.64	0.4

== Production ==
=== Development ===
CBS announced that Love Island had been renewed for a third season on January 27, 2021, with Vandenberg confirmed to return as host on the same day. On May 13, 2021, it was announced that the season would be premiering on July 7, 2021, after the premiere of the twenty-third season of Big Brother.

=== Casting ===
In an effort to promote diversity, CBS announced a new rule for Love Island and other non-scripted reality television shows on the network, that 50% of all contestants must be a Person of Color or an Indigenous person for the 2021–2022 broadcast season. Along with Big Brother, Kassting, Inc. will no longer be providing casting services for the upcoming third season. Ally Capriotti Grant, an Emmy Award-winning casting director responsible for casting Queer Eye and previous Hell's Kitchen seasons, led the casting efforts for Love Island 3.
