= Love Island Games season 2 =

2025 season of Love Island Games

Love Island Games
- Season 2
- Promotional poster
- Presented by: Ariana Madix
- Winners: Isaiah Campbell; Lucinda Strafford
- Runners-up: Justine Ndiba; Tyrique Hyde
- No. of episodes: 18

Release
- Original network: Peacock
- Original release: September 16 – October 5, 2025

Season chronology
- ← Previous; Season 1

The second season of the television reality program Love Island Games premiered on September 16, 2025. The season is hosted by Ariana Madix.

== Production ==
Following the conclusion of the sixth season of the American version, it was announced in August 2024 that the series had been renewed for a second season. It was announced on the season seven finale that the season would air on September 16, 2025. The season was filmed at the villa from the sixth and seventh season of Love Island USA in Fiji.

== Format ==
Love Island Games sees former islanders from across the globe return to the villa, ready for "another shot at love". They will meet new bombshells, recouple and face elimination, while also facing new twists that will give a competitive spin to their time in the villa - including team and couples challenges.

Unlike the first season of the Games and like the regular edition of Love Island, this season was produced live and featured America voting throughout the show to impact the game.

== Contestants ==
The original cast of islanders was announced on September 9, 2025.

Solène Favreau appeared on Bravo's Below Deck. Toby Aromolaran, Justine Ndiba and Johnny Middlebrooks were on season one of Love Island Games. Aromolaran and Casey O'Gorman were on series one of Love Island: All Stars. O'Gorman and Gabby Allen were on series two of Love Island: All Stars. Marvin Anthony was on season two of Too Hot to Handle.

Islander	Age	Original franchise	Season/Series	Entered	Exited	Status
Isaiah Campbell	24	Love Island USA	Season 4	Day 1	Day 15	Winner
Lucinda Strafford	25	Love Island UK	Series 7	Day 1	Day 15	Winner
Justine Ndiba	32	Love Island USA	Season 2	Day 3	Day 15	Runner-up
Tyrique Hyde	26	Love Island UK	Series 10	Day 1	Day 15	Runner-up
Sydney Paight	25	Love Island USA	Season 4	Day 6	Day 15	Third place
Toby Aromolaran	26	Love Island UK	Series 7	Day 4	Day 15	Third place
Johnny Middlebrooks	27	Love Island USA	Season 2	Day 3	Day 15	Dumped
Gabby Allen	33	Love Island UK	Series 3	Day 9	Day 15	Dumped
Andrea Carmona	27	Love Island USA	Season 6	Day 1	Day 14	Dumped
Josh Goldstein	28	Love Island USA	Season 3	Day 1	Day 14	Dumped
Casey O'Gorman	28	Love Island UK	Series 9	Day 9	Day 13	Dumped
Garbi Denteh	22	Love Island Nederland & België	Season 4	Day 1	Day 13	Dumped
Kendall Washington	29	Love Island USA	Season 6	Day 1	Day 12	Dumped
Nicola Gauci Borda-Warr	23	Love Island Malta	Season 1	Day 1	Day 12	Dumped
Andreina Santos-Marte	24	Love Island USA	Season 7	Day 1	Day 10	Dumped
Marvin Anthony	30	Love Island France	Season 1	Day 6	Day 10	Dumped
Christopher "Chris" Seeley	27	Love Island USA	Season 7	Day 1	Day 7	Dumped
Vickala "Kay Kay" Gray	26	Love Island USA	Season 5	Day 1	Day 7	Dumped
Mert Okatan	25	Love Island Nederland & België	Season 2/Season 3	Day 1	Day 5	Dumped
Solène Favreau	26	Love Island France	Season 2	Day 1	Day 5	Dumped
Charlie Georgiou	27	Love Island USA	Season 7	Day 1	Day 3	Dumped

=== Future appearances ===
In 2026, Lucinda Strafford appeared in the third series of Love Island: All Stars. Johnny Middlebrooks appeared on season three of House of Villains. Andreina Santos-Marte and Chris Seeley appeared on season two of Love Island: Beyond the Villa. Toby Aromolaran competed on the fourth series of Celebrity Ex on the Beach. Josh Goldstein will compete on season 42 of The Challenge.

== Coupling and elimination history ==
	Week 1								Week 2							Week 3		
	Day 1		Day 2	Day 3		Day 4	Day 5	Day 7	Day 8	Day 9	Day 10	Day 12	Day 13		Day 14	Day 15	Final	
Isaiah	Nicola			Selected	Kendall to save	Nicola	Vulnerable	Andreina and Toby to save	Lucinda	Vulnerable	Safe	Power; Squad	Lucinda	Safe	Finalist		Split the 250k	Winner (Day 15)
Lucinda	Mert	Single	Tyrique		Kendall to save	Tyrique	Vulnerable / Safe	Safe	Isaiah	Saved by Toby	Safe	Power; Squad	Isaiah	Safe	Finalist		Winner (Day 15)	
Justine	Not in Villa			Immune	Charlie to save	Josh	Safe	Safe	Tyrique	Vulnerable	Safe	Saved by Power Squad	Tyrique	Safe	Vulnerable	Finalist	Runner-up (Day 15)	
Tyrique	Andreina		Lucinda		Charlie to save	Lucinda	Vulnerable / Safe	Safe	Justine	Saved by Sydney	Safe	Power; Squad	Justine	Safe	Vulnerable	Finalist	Runner-up (Day 15)	
Sydney	Not in Villa							Safe	Toby	Tyrique to save	Safe	Saved by Power Squad	Toby	Safe	Vulnerable	Finalist	Third place (Day 15)	
Toby	Not in Villa					Andrea	Vulnerable	Saved by Isaiah & Nicola	Sydney	Lucinda to save	Safe	Power; Squad	Sydney	Safe	Vulnerable	Finalist	Third place (Day 15)	
Gabby	Not in Villa									Johnny	Safe	Power; Squad	Johnny	Vulnerable	Vulnerable	Eliminated	Dumped (Day 15)	
Johnny	Not in Villa			Immune	Kendall to save	Andreina	Vulnerable / Safe	Vulnerable	Andreina	Safe		Power; Squad	Gabby	Vulnerable	Vulnerable	Eliminated	Dumped (Day 15)	
Andrea	Josh	Charlie	Josh		Kendall to save	Toby	Vulnerable	Vulnerable	Josh	Vulnerable	Safe	Power; Squad	Josh	Vulnerable	Eliminated	Dumped (Day 14)		
Josh	Andrea	Single	Andrea		Kendall to save	Justine	Safe	Safe	Andrea	Vulnerable	Safe	Vulnerable	Andrea	Vulnerable	Eliminated	Dumped (Day 14)		
Casey	Not in Villa									Nicola	Safe	Saved by Power Squad	Garbi	Eliminated	Dumped (Day 13)			
Garbi	Kendall			Selected	Kendall to save	Kendall	Safe	Safe	Kendall	Vulnerable		Vulnerable	Casey	Eliminated	Dumped (Day 13)			
Kendall	Garbi			Selected	Vulnerable	Garbi	Safe	Safe	Garbi	Vulnerable		Vulnerable	Dumped (Day 12)					
Nicola	Isaiah			Selected	Kendall to save	Isaiah	Vulnerable	Andreina and Toby to save	Marvin	Saved by Casey	Safe	Vulnerable	Dumped (Day 12)					
Andreina	Tyrique		Single	Vulnerable	Charlie to save	Johnny	Vulnerable / Safe	Saved by Isaiah & Nicola	Johnny	Safe / Vulnerable	Vulnerable	Dumped (Day 10)						
Marvin	Not in Villa							Safe	Nicola	Vulnerable		Dumped (Day 10)						
Chris	Kay Kay				Charlie to save	Kay Kay	Mert & Solène; Vulnerable	Vulnerable	Dumped (Day 7)									
Kay Kay	Chris				Kendall to save	Chris	Mert & Solène; Vulnerable	Vulnerable	Dumped (Day 7)									
Mert	Lucinda	Solène			Kendall to save	Solène	Safe / Vulnerable	Dumped (Day 5)										
Solène	Not in Villa	Mert			Charlie to save	Mert	Safe / Vulnerable	Dumped (Day 5)										
Charlie	Not in Villa	Andrea	Single	Vulnerable		Dumped (Day 3)												
Notes	1	2	3	4	5	none	6	7	8	9	10	11	none	12	13	14	15	
Dumped	No; Dumping				Charlie; 5 of 14 votes to save	No; Dumping	Mert & Solène; America's choice to dump	Chris, Kay Kay; Lost duel	No; Dumping		Andreina, Marvin; Lost duel	Kendall, Nicola; Lost duel	No; Dumping	Casey & Garbi; Lost challenge	Andrea & Josh; Lost challenge	Gabby & Johnny; America's choice to dump	Sydney & Toby; Lost mega duel	
Dumped	No; Dumping				Charlie; 5 of 14 votes to save	No; Dumping	Mert & Solène; America's choice to dump	Chris, Kay Kay; Lost duel	No; Dumping		Andreina, Marvin; Lost duel	Kendall, Nicola; Lost duel	No; Dumping	Casey & Garbi; Lost challenge	Andrea & Josh; Lost challenge	Gabby & Johnny; America's choice to dump	Justine & Tyrique; Lost final duel	
Dumped	No; Dumping				Charlie; 5 of 14 votes to save	No; Dumping	Mert & Solène; America's choice to dump	Chris, Kay Kay; Lost duel	No; Dumping		Andreina, Marvin; Lost duel	Kendall, Nicola; Lost duel	No; Dumping	Casey & Garbi; Lost challenge	Andrea & Josh; Lost challenge	Gabby & Johnny; America's choice to dump	Isaiah & Lucinda; Won final duel	

=== Notes ===
- ^Note 1: On Day 1, the islanders competed in a challenge and based on their times in the challenge, the islanders determined the order in which they chose to couple up.
- ^Note 2: On Day 1, Charlie and Solène each kissed the islanders. They then chose to couple up with Andrea and Mert. The remaining islanders, Josh and Lucinda, became single and vulnerable.
- ^Note 3: On Day 2, Josh & Lucinda chose to duel Charlie & Andreina for their partners, Andrea and Tyrique. They were both successful with Charlie and Andreina both becoming single and vulnerable.
- ^Note 4: On Day 3, single islanders Andreina and Charlie coupled with new bombshells Johnny and Justine. Andreina & Johnny chose Garbi & Kendall to duel while Charlie & Justine chose Isaiah & Nicola. Charlie & Justine lost their duel, leaving Charlie vulnerable. Andreina & Johnny won their duel. Andreina chose Kendall to be vulnerable.
- ^Note 5: On Day 3, the safe islanders had to vote for a vulnerable islander they wanted to save. The islander who received the least votes would be dumped. Charlie received the least votes, dumping him from the Villa.
- ^Note 6: On Day 4, the four bottom couples from the challenge became vulnerable. The power couple, Kay Kay & Chris, had to decide on a safe couple to make vulnerable. They chose Solène & Mert. America voted for the couple they wanted to keep in the game. On Day 5, Andreina & Johnny and Lucinda & Tyrique were the top two vulnerable couples voted by America and were safe. The bottom three vulnerable couples each then chose a box, two with safe hearts and one with a dumped heart. They, however, faced a choice, rely on America for safety or what is in the boxes. They chose to go off America's vote. The couple who received the least votes, Solène & Mert, was dumped from the Villa.
- ^Note 7: On Day 7, the power couple, Nicola & Isaiah, had to decide on any two vulnerable girls and any two vulnerable boys to face off in the duel. They chose Chris and Johnny and Andrea and Kay Kay to duel. Chris had to forfeit the second round due to injury, so by default Johnny won the duel.
- ^Note 8: On Day 8, both islanders had to choose one another to officially become a couple. Justine and Tyrique were not mutually chosen to be in a couple and remained single. However, after all islanders were finished as the only single islanders they became the final couple.
- ^Note 9: On Day 9, the five bottom couples from the challenge became vulnerable. Vulnerable and safe islanders could choose to couple with new bombshells, Casey and Gabby. As only one girl to choose to leave her couple, Casey coupled up with Nicola. Gabby decided to couple up with Johnny, leaving Andreina now vulnerable. The power couple, Sydney & Toby, had to decide on a vulnerable islander to make safe. Toby chose the girl islander, Lucinda. Sydney chose the boy islander, Tyrique. Out of the vulnerable islanders, America votes which boys and girls they wanted to keep in the game.
- ^Note 10: On Day 10, America votes to keep Andrea, Justine, Josh and Isaiah safe. Garbi and Andreina faced off in a duel for the girls and Kendall and Marvin faced off in a duel for the boys. Andreina and Marvin lost their duels and were dumped from the Villa.
- ^Note 11: On Day 11, the losing team from the challenge, Casey, Garbi, Josh, Justine, Kendall, Nicola and Sydney, became vulnerable. The power squad, Andrea, Gabby, Isaiah, Johnny, Lucinda, Toby and Tyrique, had to decide on any two vulnerable girls and any two vulnerable boys to face off in the duel. Nicola had to forfeit the third round due to injury, by default Garbi won the duel because it was 1–0.
- ^Note 12: On Day 13, following a series of challenges, the bottom three couples became vulnerable. The bottom three vulnerable couples each chose a card. The couple with the lowest card, Garbi & Casey, faced a choice, rely on the safe islanders for safety or spin a wheel. If they spin the wheel and it lands on a red space they are safe. However, if it lands on a white space they will be immediately dumped from the Villa. They chose to spin the wheel. It landed on a white space and Garbi & Casey were dumped from the Villa.
- ^Note 13: On Day 14, Andrea & Josh held the white ball at the end of the challenge, and therefore were the losers and instantly dumped from the Villa. For holding the most balls at the end of the challenge Isaiah & Lucinda were awarded a spot into the finale, while the remaining couples remained vulnerable.
- ^Note 14: America voted for the couples they wanted to see in the Mega Duel. The couple who received the least votes, Gabby & Johnny, was dumped from the Villa.
- ^Note 15: On Day 15, the final three couples competed in two final duels to determine the winners of Love Island Games.

== Episodes ==
No. overall	No. in season	Title	Day(s)	Original release date	Prod. code
Week 1
20	1	"Episode 1"	Day 1	September 16, 2025	201
21	2	"Episode 2"	Days 1–2	September 17, 2025	202
22	3	"Episode 3"	Days 2–3	September 18, 2025	203
23	4	"Episode 4"	Days 3–4	September 19, 2025	204
24	5	"Episode 5: Aftersun"	N/A (Note: This episode showcased events from the previous days in the week. No new or present days were featured.)	September 20, 2025	205
25	6	"Episode 6"	Days 4–5	September 21, 2025	206
26	7	"Episode 7"	Days 5–6	September 22, 2025	207
27	8	"Episode 8"	Days 6–7	September 23, 2025	208
Week 2
28	9	"Episode 9"	Days 7–8	September 25, 2025	209
29	10	"Episode 10"	Days 8–9	September 26, 2025	210
30	11	"Episode 11: Aftersun"	N/A	September 27, 2025	211
31	12	"Episode 12"	Days 9–10	September 28, 2025	212
32	13	"Episode 13"	Days 10–11	September 29, 2025	213
33	14	"Episode 14"	Days 11–12	September 30, 2025	214
34	15	"Episode 15"	Days 12–13	October 2, 2025	215
35	16	"Episode 16"	Days 13–14	October 3, 2025	216
Week 3
36	17	"Episode 17: Aftersun"	N/A	October 4, 2025	217
37	18	"Episode 18"	Days 14–15	October 5, 2025	218
