= Love Island Games season 1 =

2023 season of Love Island Games

Love Island Games
- Season 1
- Promotional poster
- Presented by: Maya Jama
- No. of days: 17
- Winners: Jack Fowler; Justine Ndiba
- Runners-up: Aurelia Lamprecht; Johnny Middlebrooks
- No. of episodes: 19

Release
- Original network: Peacock
- Original release: November 1 – November 20, 2023

Season chronology
- Next → Season 2

The first season of the television reality program Love Island Games premiered on November 1, 2023. The season was hosted by Maya Jama.

== Production ==
In April 2023, it was reported that Love Island Games, a spin-off of the reality dating franchise Love Island had been commissioned by American streaming service Peacock. In August 2023, Maya Jama, who has presented the British version of the show since its ninth series, was announced as the show's host. Iain Stirling, who has narrated the British version since its inception and American version since its fourth season, was announced as narrator. The series began filming in Fiji in September 2023, and began broadcasting on November 1, 2023. Maura Higgins, who was a contestant on the fifth series of the British version, served as the show's social media ambassador. Higgins and Ariana Madix served as guest hosts for competitions.

== Format ==
Love Island Games sees former islanders from across the globe return to the villa, ready for "another shot at love". They will meet new bombshells, recouple and face elimination, while also facing new twists that will give a competitive spin to their time in the villa - including team and couples challenges.

== Location ==
The season was filmed at the villa from the fifth season of Love Island USA in Fiji.

== Contestants ==
The contestants competing in the first season were announced on October 4, 2023.

Islander	Age	Original franchise	Season/Series	Entered	Exited	Status
Justine Ndiba	30	Love Island USA	Season 2	Day 1	Day 17	Winner
Jack Fowler	27	Love Island UK	Series 4	Day 1	Day 17	Winner
Aurelia Lamprecht	25	Love Island Germany	Season 4	Day 12	Day 17	Runner-up
Johnny Middlebrooks	25	Love Island USA	Season 2	Day 2	Day 17	Runner-up
Callum Hole	25	Love Island Australia	Season 4	Day 1	Day 17	Third place
Deborah "Deb" Chubb	27	Love Island USA	Season 4	Day 12	Day 17	Third place
Cely Vazquez	27	Love Island USA	Season 2	Day 1	Day 16	Dumped
Eyal Booker	28	Love Island UK	Series 4	Day 6	Day 16	Dumped
Mitch Hibberd	26	Love Island Australia	Season 3	Day 12	Day 16	Dumped
Zeta Morrison	30	Love Island USA	Season 4	Day 12	Day 16	Dumped
Courtney Boerner	25	Love Island USA	Season 4	Day 9	Day 15	Dumped
Scott van-der-Sluis	22	Love Island UK	Series 10	Day 12	Day 15	Dumped
Imani Wheeler	22	Love Island USA	Season 5	Day 1	Day 15	Dumped
Raymond "Ray" Gantt	27	Love Island USA	Season 1	Day 1	Day 15	Dumped
Jessica Losurdo	27	Love Island Australia	Season 4	Day 1	Day 14	Dumped
Tina Provis	27	Love Island Australia	Season 3	Day 12	Day 14	Dumped
Mike Boateng	28	Love Island UK	Series 6	Day 9	Day 13	Dumped
Liberty Poole	24	Love Island UK	Series 7	Day 1	Day 13	Dumped
Kyra Green	26	Love Island USA	Season 1	Day 5	Day 11	Dumped
Carrington Rodriguez	26	Love Island USA	Season 2	Day 9	Day 11	Dumped
Megan Barton-Hanson	29	Love Island UK	Series 4	Day 2	Day 9	Walked
Georgia Steel	25	Love Island UK	Series 4	Day 6	Day 9	Dumped
Toby Aromolaran	24	Love Island UK	Series 7	Day 1	Day 9	Dumped
Curtis Pritchard	27	Love Island UK	Series 5	Day 1	Day 6	Dumped
Lisa Celander	28	Love Island Sweden	Season 3	Day 1	Day 6	Dumped
Stephane "Steph" Blackos	23	Love Island France	Season 2	Day 1	Day 4	Dumped

=== Future appearances ===
In 2024, Toby Aromolaran, Liberty Poole and Georgia Steel appeared in the first series of Love Island: All Stars.

In 2025, Curtis Pritchard appeared in the second series of Love Island: All Stars. Justine Ndiba, Ray Gantt, Scott van-der-Sluis, and Carrington Rodriguez appeared on season three of Perfect Match. Cely Vazquez made guest appearances on Love Island: Beyond the Villa. Ndiba, Aromolaran and Johnny Middlebrooks returned for season 2 of Love Island Games.

In 2026, Green, Pritchard, and van-der-Sluis appeared in the third series of Love Island: All Stars. Middlebrooks appeared on season three of House of Villains. Pritchard and Aromolaran competed on the fourth series of Celebrity Ex on the Beach.

== Coupling and elimination history ==
	Week 1								Week 2						Week 3				
	Day 1		Day 2	Day 4		Day 5	Day 6		Day 9	Day 10	Day 11	Day 12	Day 13	Day 14	Day 15	Day 16		Final	
Justine	Jack			Saved by Imani & Johnny	Steph to dump	Jack	Safe	Callum & Liberty to save	Safe	Jack	Vulnerable	Callum	Saved by safe islanders	Jack	Mitch & Zeta to save	Finalist		Split the 100k	Winner (Day 17)
Jack	Justine			Saved by Imani & Johnny	Steph to dump	Justine	Safe	Callum & Liberty to save	Safe	Justine	Vulnerable	Liberty	Vulnerable	Justine	Mitch & Zeta to save	Finalist		Winner (Day 17)	
Aurelia	Not in Villa													Johnny	Safe	Vulnerable	Finalist	Runner-up (Day 17)	
Johnny	Not in Villa		Imani	Jack & Justine to save	Lisa to dump	Jessica	Safe	Callum & Liberty to save	Saved by Imani & Ray	Courtney	Safe	Courtney	Safe	Aurelia	Safe	Vulnerable	Finalist	Runner-up (Day 17)	
Callum	Liberty	Selected	Liberty	Safe	Steph to dump	Liberty	Vulnerable		Vulnerable	Liberty	Power; Couple	Justine	Saved by safe islanders	Deb	Safe	Vulnerable	Finalist	Third place (Day 17)	
Deb	Not in Villa													Callum	Safe	Vulnerable	Finalist	Third place (Day 17)	
Cely	Toby	Selected	Toby	Safe	Steph to dump	Toby	Vulnerable	Eyal	Safe	Eyal	Safe	Ray	Safe	Eyal	Safe	Vulnerable	Eliminated	Dumped (Day 16)	
Eyal	Not in Villa							Cely	Safe	Cely	Safe	Imani	Safe	Cely	Safe	Vulnerable	Eliminated	Dumped (Day 16)	
Mitch	Not in Villa													Zeta	Saved by Jack & Justine	Eliminated	Callum & Deb to save	Dumped (Day 16)	
Zeta	Not in Villa													Mitch	Saved by Jack & Justine	Eliminated	Callum & Deb to save	Dumped (Day 16)	
Courtney	Not in Villa									Johnny	Safe	Johnny	Safe	Scott	Vulnerable	Dumped (Day 15)	Callum & Deb to save	Dumped (Day 15)	
Scott	Not in Villa													Courtney	Vulnerable	Dumped (Day 15)	Aurelia & Johnny to save	Dumped (Day 15)	
Imani	Ray	Selected	Johnny	Jack & Justine to save	Lisa to dump	Ray	Curtis & Lisa; Vulnerable	Safe	Georgia & Toby; Vulnerable	Mike	Safe	Eyal	Safe	Ray	Vulnerable	Dumped (Day 15)	Callum & Deb to save	Dumped (Day 15)	
Ray	Imani	Vulnerable	Jessica	Safe	Lisa to dump	Imani	Curtis & Lisa; Vulnerable	Safe	Georgia & Toby; Vulnerable	Jessica	Vulnerable	Cely	Safe	Imani	Vulnerable	Dumped (Day 15)	Aurelia & Johnny to save	Dumped (Day 15)	
Jessica	Steph	Vulnerable	Ray	Safe	Lisa to dump	Johnny	Safe	Callum & Liberty to save	Saved by Imani & Ray	Ray	Vulnerable	Mike	Vulnerable	Single	Dumped (Day 14)		Callum & Deb to save	Dumped (Day 14)	
Tina	Not in Villa													Single	Dumped (Day 14)		Callum & Deb to save	Dumped (Day 14)	
Liberty	Callum	Vulnerable	Callum	Safe	Steph to dump	Callum	Vulnerable		Vulnerable	Callum	Power; Couple	Jack	Vulnerable	Dumped (Day 13)			Callum & Deb to save	Dumped (Day 13)	
Mike	Not in Villa									Imani	Safe	Jessica	Vulnerable	Dumped (Day 13)			Aurelia & Johnny to save	Dumped (Day 13)	
Carrington	Not in Villa									Kyra	Vulnerable	Dumped (Day 11)					Aurelia & Johnny to save	Dumped (Day 11)	
Kyra	Not in Villa					Megan	Safe	Callum & Liberty to save	Safe	Carrington	Vulnerable	Dumped (Day 11)					Cely & Eyal to save	Dumped (Day 11)	
Megan	Not in Villa		Steph	Vulnerable		Kyra	Safe	Callum & Liberty to save	Safe	Walked (Day 9)									
Georgia	Not in Villa							Toby	Safe / Vulnerable	Dumped (Day 9)							Cely & Eyal to save	Dumped (Day 9)	
Toby	Cely	Vulnerable	Cely	Safe	Steph to dump	Cely	Vulnerable	Georgia	Safe / Vulnerable	Dumped (Day 9)							Callum & Deb to save	Dumped (Day 9)	
Curtis	Lisa			Vulnerable		Lisa	Safe / Vulnerable		Dumped (Day 6)								Callum & Deb to save	Dumped (Day 6)	
Lisa	Curtis			Vulnerable		Curtis	Safe / Vulnerable		Dumped (Day 6)								Aurelia & Johnny to save	Dumped (Day 6)	
Steph	Jessica	Selected	Megan	Vulnerable		Dumped (Day 4)											Aurelia & Johnny to save	Dumped (Day 4)	
Notes	1	2		3	4	none	5	6	7	8	9	10	11	none	12	13	14	15	
Walked	none									Megan	none								
Dumped	No; Dumping				Steph; 3 of 5 votes to dump	No; Dumping		Curtis & Lisa; 0 of 3 votes to save	Georgia & Toby; Lost duel	No; Dumping	Carrington; Boys' choice to dump	No; Dumping	Liberty, Mike; Lost duel	Jessica, Tina; Failed to couple up	Courtney & Scott, Imani & Ray; Jack & Justine's choice to dump	Mitch & Zeta; Lost challenge	Cely & Eyal; 2 of 17 votes to save	Callum & Deb; Lost mega duel	
Dumped	No; Dumping				Steph; 3 of 5 votes to dump	No; Dumping		Curtis & Lisa; 0 of 3 votes to save	Georgia & Toby; Lost duel	No; Dumping	Carrington; Boys' choice to dump	No; Dumping	Liberty, Mike; Lost duel	Jessica, Tina; Failed to couple up	Courtney & Scott, Imani & Ray; Jack & Justine's choice to dump	Mitch & Zeta; Lost challenge	Cely & Eyal; 2 of 17 votes to save	Aurelia & Johnny; Lost final duel	
Dumped	No; Dumping				Steph; 3 of 5 votes to dump	No; Dumping		Curtis & Lisa; 0 of 3 votes to save	Georgia & Toby; Lost duel	No; Dumping	Kyra; Girls' choice to dump	No; Dumping	Liberty, Mike; Lost duel	Jessica, Tina; Failed to couple up	Courtney & Scott, Imani & Ray; Jack & Justine's choice to dump	Mitch & Zeta; Lost challenge	Cely & Eyal; 2 of 17 votes to save	Jack & Justine; Won final duel	

=== Notes ===
- ^Note 1: On Day 1, the girls competed in a challenge and based on their times in the challenge, the girls determined the order in which they chose to couple up.
- ^Note 2: On Day 1, Johnny and Megan each anonymously kissed two islanders. On Day 2, the four islanders whose partners were chosen became vulnerable, and Johnny and Megan chose to duel Ray and Jessica for their partners, Imani and Steph.
- ^Note 3: On Day 4, the three bottom couples from the challenge became vulnerable. The power couple, Imani and Johnny, decided to save Jack and Justine, leaving the other bottom couples at risk.
- ^Note 4: On Day 4, the safe couples had to vote for a vulnerable islander they wanted to dump. The islander who received the most votes would be dumped. Steph received the most votes, dumping him from the Villa.
- ^Note 5: On Day 6, the two bottom couples from the challenge became vulnerable. The power couple, Imani and Ray, had to decide on a safe couple to make vulnerable. They chose Curtis and Lisa.
- ^Note 6: On Day 6, bombshells Eyal and Georgia chose to save and couple up with vulnerable islanders, Cely and Toby, leaving two couples vulnerable at the dumping. The safe couples had to vote for the vulnerable couple they wanted to save. The couple who received the fewest votes would be dumped. Curtis and Lisa received the fewest votes, dumping them from the Villa.
- ^Note 7: On Day 8, the islanders decided to award other couples coins earned from the challenge. The couple who received the fewest coins would become the new power couple. The two couples who received the most coins would become vulnerable. Imani and Ray became the new power couple while Callum & Liberty and Jessica & Johnny became vulnerable. On Day 9, the power couple, Imani and Ray, chose Jessica & Johnny to be saved from the duel and replaced them with Georgia & Toby, making them vulnerable.
- ^Note 8: On Day 9, Megan had to leave the game for undisclosed medical reasons.
- ^Note 9: On Day 11, the three bottom couples from the challenge became vulnerable. The safe boys then had to decide which vulnerable man to dump, choosing Carrington, and the safe girls had to decide which vulnerable woman to dump, choosing Kyra.
- ^Note 10: On Day 12, the power couple, Callum and Liberty, had the power to mix up all of the couples ahead of the next challenge.
- ^Note 11: On Day 12, the three bottom couples from the challenge became vulnerable. The safe couples were given a chance to save one of the vulnerable couples, saving Callum and Justine, leaving the other bottom couples at risk.
- ^Note 12: On Day 15, the three bottom couples from the challenge became vulnerable. The carnival then granted one couple the golden heart which would allow them to save one of the vulnerable couples. Jack and Justine received the golden heart, saving Mitch and Zeta, leaving Imani and Ray & Courtney and Scott to be dumped from the villa.
- ^Note 13: On Day 16, Mitch and Zeta held the red tire at the end of the challenge, and therefore were the losers and instantly dumped from the villa. For holding the most tires at the end of the challenge Justin and Jack were awarded a spot into the finale, while the remaining couples remained vulnerable.
- ^Note 14: On Day 16, previous dumped Islanders voted to send one couple into the finale. The one couple who received the fewest votes was dumped from the villa. Eyal and Cely received the fewest votes and was therefore dumped from the villa.
- ^Note 15: On Day 17, the final three couples competed in two final duels to determine the winners of Love Island Games.

== Episodes ==
No. overall	No. in season	Title	Day(s)	Original release date	Prod. code
Week 1
1	1	"Episode 1"	Day 1	November 1, 2023	101
2	2	"Episode 2"	Days 1–2	November 2, 2023	102
3	3	"Episode 3"	Days 2–3	November 3, 2023	103
4	4	"Episode 4"	Days 3–4	November 5, 2023	104
5	5	"Episode 5"	Days 4–5	November 6, 2023	105
6	6	"Episode 6"	Days 5–6	November 7, 2023	106
7	7	"Episode 7"	Days 6–7	November 8, 2023	107
Week 2
8	8	"Episode 8"	Days 7–8	November 9, 2023	108
9	9	"Episode 9"	Days 8–9	November 10, 2023	109
10	10	"Episode 10: Unseen Bits"	N/A (Note: This episode showcased events from the previous days in the week. No new or present days were featured.)	November 11, 2023	110
11	11	"Episode 11"	Days 9–10	November 12, 2023	111
12	12	"Episode 12"	Days 10–11	November 13, 2023	112
13	13	"Episode 13"	Days 11–12	November 14, 2023	113
14	14	"Episode 14"	Days 12–13	November 15, 2023	114
15	15	"Episode 15"	Days 13–14	November 16, 2023	115
Week 3
16	16	"Episode 16"	Days 14–15	November 17, 2023	116
17	17	"Episode 17: Unseen Bits"	N/A	November 18, 2023	117
18	18	"Episode 18"	Days 15–16	November 19, 2023	118
19	19	"Episode 19"	Days 16–17	November 20, 2023	119
