= Love Island USA season 4 =

2022 season of Love Island USA

Love Island USA
- Season 4
- Promotional poster for the season.
- Hosted by: Sarah Hyland
- No. of contestants: 34
- Winners: Zeta Morrison; Timmy Pandolfi
- Runners-up: Isaiah Campbell; Sydney Paight
- Companion show: Previous On...: The Official Love Island USA Podcast
- No. of episodes: 38

Release
- Original network: Peacock
- Original release: July 19 – September 1, 2022

Season chronology
- ← Previous; Season 3 Next → Season 5

The 4th season of the American version of the television reality program Love Island premiered on July 19, 2022. The fourth season is the first to be released on Peacock, after the series previously aired on CBS. Sarah Hyland takes over hosting duties from Arielle Vandenberg, who hosted the series for its first three seasons.

Matthew Hoffman, who provided voice-over narration for the first three seasons, also does not return for this season. Instead, the narrator of the original British version, Iain Stirling, takes over as narrator.

== Format ==
Love Island is a reality television program in which a group of contestants, who are referred to as "Islanders", are living in a villa in Santa Barbara, California. The Islanders are cut off from the outside world and are under constant video surveillance. To survive in the villa, the Islanders must be in a relationship with another Islander. The Islanders couple up for the first time on first impressions but they are later forced to "re-couple" at special ceremonies in which they can choose to remain with their current partners or to switch partners. At the villa, the couples must share a bed for sleeping and are permitted to talk with other Islanders at any time, allowing them to get to know everyone. While in the villa, each Islander has their own telephone, with which they can contact other Islanders via text and can receive text messages informing them of the latest challenges, dumpings, and re-couplings. While the Islanders might appear to have unmediated access to the outside world, they are limited in both their alcohol consumption and communication with the outside world.

The Islanders are presented with many games and challenges that are designed to test their physical and mental abilities, after which the winners are sometimes presented with special prizes, such as a night at the Hideaway or a special date.

Islanders can be eliminated, or "dumped", for several reasons; these include remaining single after a re-coupling and by public vote through the Love Island mobile app. During the show's final week, members of the public vote to decide which couple should win the series; the couple who receives the most votes win.

At the envelope ceremony on finale night, the couple who received the highest number of votes from the public receives two envelopes, one for each partner. One envelope contains $100,000 and the other contains nothing. The partner with the $100,000 envelope may choose whether to share the money with their partner as a test of trust and commitment.

== Islanders ==
The original islanders of the fourth season of Love Island USA. Left to right: Deb, Timmy, Sydney, Jesse, Zeta, Andy, Courtney, Felipe, Sereniti and Isaiah

The initial Islanders were revealed on July 11, 2022.

Bria and Chazz Bryant are the first set of siblings to compete on the show in the USA franchise.

For the first time in the show's history, the series featured a returning contestant, with Mackenzie Dipman having previously appeared in the second season.

Kyle Fraser was removed from the villa on Day 20 following a number of complaints made about his past actions towards women. This included harassment, verbal abuse, inappropriate behavior, and sexual assault.

Islander	Age	Hometown	Entered	Exited	Status	Ref
Timmy Pandolfi	29	New York City, New York	Day 1	Day 32	Winner	
Zeta Morrison	29	Surrey, United Kingdom (Note: Zeta Morrison is originally from Surrey in the United Kingdom but was residing in Los Angeles, California at the time of casting and filming.)	Day 1	Day 32	Winner	
Isaiah Campbell	21	Sioux Falls, South Dakota	Day 1	Day 32	Runner-up	
Sydney Paight	22	Houston, Texas	Day 1	Day 32	Runner-up	
Deb Chubb	26	Dallas, Texas	Day 1	Day 32	Third place	
Jesse Bray	27	Springfield, Ohio	Day 1	Day 32	Third place	
Jeff Christian	25	Cincinnati, Ohio	Day 8	Day 31	Walked	
Nadjha Day	23	Atlanta, Georgia	Day 12	Day 31	Walked	
Chad Robinson	23	Clarkston, Michigan	Day 16	Day 30	Dumped	
Phoebe Siegel	21	Bedford Hills, New York	Day 16	Day 30	Dumped	
Mackenzie Dipman	25	Scottsdale, Arizona	Day 23	Day 28	Walked	
Joel Bierwert	27	Northampton, Massachusetts	Day 21	Day 28	Dumped	
Courtney Boerner	24	Winter Park, Florida	Day 1	Day 24	Dumped	
Katherine "Kat" Gibson	21	Manassas, Virginia	Day 12	Day 22	Walked	
Chanse Corbi	21	Los Angeles, California	Day 16	Day 22	Dumped	
Jared Hassim	23	Los Angeles, California	Day 12	Day 22	Dumped	
Chazz Bryant	21	Clifton, New Jersey	Day 6	Day 22	Dumped	
Gabriella "Bella" Barbaro	22	Oakdale, New York	Day 16	Day 22	Dumped	
Nicholas "Nic" Birchall	22	Caracas, Venezuela (Note: Nicholas Birchall is originally from Caracas in Venezuela but was residing in San Diego, California at the time of casting and filming.)	Day 16	Day 21	Walked	
Kyle Fraser	29	Buffalo, New York	Day 16	Day 20	Removed	
Avery Grooms	24	Fresno, California	Day 16	Day 19	Dumped	
Gabby Kiszka	23	Westwood, New Jersey	Day 16	Day 19	Dumped	
Jordan Morello	28	Plantation, Florida	Day 16	Day 19	Dumped	
Sam Kornse	24	Phillipsburg, New Jersey	Day 16	Day 19	Dumped	
Tigerlily Cooley	24	Seattle, Washington	Day 16	Day 19	Dumped	
Tre Watson	26	Corona, California	Day 16	Day 19	Dumped	
Madison "Mady" McLanahan	26	Dallas, Texas	Day 1	Day 15	Walked	
Bryce Fins	30	San Diego, California	Day 8	Day 15	Dumped	
Sereniti Springs	28	Clovis, California	Day 1	Day 13	Dumped	
Bria Bryant	24	Clifton, New Jersey	Day 6	Day 11	Dumped	
Andy Voyen	23	Minneapolis, Minnesota	Day 1	Day 11	Dumped	
Felipe Gomes	32	São Paulo, Brazil (Note: Felipe Gomes is originally from São Paulo in Brazil but was residing in Dubai at the time of casting and filming.)	Day 1	Day 9	Dumped	
Tyler Radziszewski	23	Cleveland, Ohio	Day 4	Day 7	Dumped	
Valerie "Val" Bragg	23	San José, Costa Rica (Note: Valerie Bragg is originally from San José in Costa Rica but was residing in Orlando, Florida at the time of casting and filming.)	Day 1	Day 5	Dumped	

=== Future appearances ===
Courtney Boerner, Deb Chubb and Zeta Morrison all appeared on season one of Love Island Games.

Sydney Paight appeared as a bombshell on season six of Love Island Australia.

Boerner, Kat Gibson, and Paight made a guest appearance on Love Island: Beyond the Villa.

Isaiah Campbell and Paight competed on season two of Love Island Games.

Chubb will compete on season 42 of The Challenge.

== Production ==
=== Development ===
On February 23, 2022, it was announced that the series would no longer air on CBS, who aired the first three seasons. The series was picked up for two additional seasons, including the fourth season by Peacock. In addition, the series no longer aired on CTV in Canada, who simulcasted the first three seasons with CBS. Instead, the series streamed on the CTV website and app, and also aired on the Crave linear channels and streaming, with episodes being added in line with Peacock. Additionally, on June 30, 2022, it was revealed that host Arielle Vandenberg would not return for the fourth season. Instead, it was revealed that actress and Modern Family star Sarah Hyland would take over as host.

The season was filmed in Santa Barbara, California.

== Coupling and elimination history ==
	Week 1					Week 2			Week 3			Week 4			Week 5			
	Day 1	Day 2	Day 5	Day 7		Day 9	Day 11	Day 13	Day 15	Day 19	Day 21	Day 22	Day 24	Day 28	Day 30	Final		
Zeta	Timmy		Timmy	Single	Vulnerable	Jeff	Safe	Timmy	Safe	Timmy		Safe	Timmy	Safe	Chad & Phoebe to dump	Finalist	Split the 100k	Winner (Day 32)
Timmy	Zeta		Zeta	Bria	N/A	Bria	Vulnerable	Zeta	Safe	Zeta		Safe	Zeta	Safe	Chad & Phoebe to dump	Finalist	Winner (Day 32)	
Isaiah	Sydney		Mady		Zeta to save	Sydney	Safe	Sydney	Safe	Phoebe		Safe	Sydney	Safe	Chad & Phoebe to dump	Finalist	Runner-up (Day 32)	
Sydney	Isaiah		Andy		Zeta to save	Isaiah	Safe	Isaiah	Safe	Single		Immune	Isaiah	Safe	Chad & Phoebe to dump	Finalist	Runner-up (Day 32)	
Deb	Jesse	Single	Jesse		Zeta to save	Jesse	Safe	Jesse	Safe	Kyle	Jesse	Safe	Jesse	Safe	Chad & Phoebe to dump	Finalist	Third place (Day 32)	
Jesse	Deb	Val	Deb		Zeta to save	Deb	Safe	Deb	Vulnerable	Single	Deb	Safe	Deb	Safe	Chad & Phoebe to dump	Finalist	Third place (Day 32)	
Jeff	Not in Villa					Zeta	Safe	Nadjha	Safe	Single	Nadjha	Safe	Nadjha	Safe	Deb & Jesse to dump	Walked (Day 31)		
Nadjha	Not in Villa							Jeff	Vulnerable	Nic	Jeff	Safe	Jeff	Safe	Deb & Jesse to dump	Walked (Day 31)		
Chad	Not in Villa									Courtney		Vulnerable	Mackenzie	Vulnerable	Deb & Jesse to dump	Dumped (Day 30)		
Phoebe	Not in Villa									Isaiah		Safe	Joel	Vulnerable	Deb & Jesse to dump	Dumped (Day 30)		
Mackenzie	Not in Villa												Chad	Vulnerable	Walked (Day 28)			
Joel	Not in Villa											Immune	Phoebe	Vulnerable	Dumped (Day 28)			
Courtney	Andy	Single	Felipe		Zeta to save	Bryce	Safe	Bryce	Vulnerable	Chad		Vulnerable	Single	Dumped (Day 24)				
Kat	Not in Villa							Chazz	Vulnerable	Single		Immune	Walked (Day 22)					
Bella	Not in Villa									Chazz		Eliminated	Dumped (Day 22)					
Chazz	Not in Villa			Sereniti	N/A	Sereniti	Safe	Kat	Vulnerable	Bella		Eliminated	Dumped (Day 22)					
Chanse	Not in Villa									Jared		Eliminated	Dumped (Day 22)					
Jared	Not in Villa							Mady	Vulnerable	Chanse		Eliminated	Dumped (Day 22)					
Nic	Not in Villa									Nadjha	Walked (Day 21)							
Kyle	Not in Villa									Deb	Removed (Day 20)							
Avery	Not in Villa									Single	Dumped (Day 19)							
Gabby	Not in Villa									Single	Dumped (Day 19)							
Jordan	Not in Villa									Single	Dumped (Day 19)							
Sam	Not in Villa									Single	Dumped (Day 19)							
Tigerlily	Not in Villa									Single	Dumped (Day 19)							
Tre	Not in Villa									Single	Dumped (Day 19)							
Mady	Single	Andy	Isaiah		Zeta to save	Andy	Vulnerable	Jared	Vulnerable	Walked (Day 15)								
Bryce	Not in Villa					Courtney	Safe	Courtney	Vulnerable	Dumped (Day 15)								
Sereniti	Felipe		Tyler	Chazz	N/A	Chazz	Safe	Single	Dumped (Day 13)									
Andy	Courtney	Mady	Sydney		Zeta to save	Mady	Vulnerable	Dumped (Day 11)										
Bria	Not in Villa			Timmy	N/A	Timmy	Vulnerable	Dumped (Day 11)										
Felipe	Sereniti		Courtney		Zeta to save	Single	Dumped (Day 9)											
Tyler	Not in Villa		Sereniti	Single	Vulnerable	Dumped (Day 7)												
Val	Single	Jesse	Single	Dumped (Day 5)														
Notes	1		none	2		none	3	none	4	5	6	7	none	8	none	9		
Walked	none								Mady	Nic	none	Kat	none	Mackenzie	none	Jeff & Nadjha		
Removed	none									Kyle	none							
Dumped	No; Dumping		Val; Failed to couple up	Tyler; 0 of 4 votes to save		Felipe; Failed to couple up	Andy; Boys' choice to dump	Sereniti; Failed to couple up	Bryce; Girls’ choice to dump	Avery, Gabby, Jordan, Sam, Tigerlily, Tre; Failed to couple up	No; Dumping	Bella & Chazz, Chanse & Jared; America's choice to dump	Courtney; Failed to couple up	Joel; Girls' choice to dump	Chad & Phoebe; 3 of 5 votes to dump	Deb & Jesse; Fewest votes to win		
Dumped	No; Dumping		Val; Failed to couple up	Tyler; 0 of 4 votes to save		Felipe; Failed to couple up	Bria; Girls' choice to dump	Sereniti; Failed to couple up	Bryce; Girls’ choice to dump	Avery, Gabby, Jordan, Sam, Tigerlily, Tre; Failed to couple up	No; Dumping	Bella & Chazz, Chanse & Jared; America's choice to dump	Courtney; Failed to couple up	Joel; Girls' choice to dump	Chad & Phoebe; 3 of 5 votes to dump	Sydney & Isaiah; Second–most votes to win		
Dumped	No; Dumping		Val; Failed to couple up	Tyler; 0 of 4 votes to save		Felipe; Failed to couple up	Bria; Girls' choice to dump	Sereniti; Failed to couple up	Bryce; Girls’ choice to dump	Avery, Gabby, Jordan, Sam, Tigerlily, Tre; Failed to couple up	No; Dumping	Bella & Chazz, Chanse & Jared; America's choice to dump	Courtney; Failed to couple up	Joel; Girls' choice to dump	Chad & Phoebe; 3 of 5 votes to dump	Zeta & Timmy; Most votes to win		

=== Notes ===
- ^Note 1: Mady and Val entered the villa after the initial coupling and were told that after twenty-four hours they'd be allowed to steal a guy from another girl.
- ^Note 2: As siblings, Bria was told to pick a girl for Chazz, and Chazz was told to pick a boy for Bria. Afterwards, the islanders had to choose between Tyler or Zeta, who were now left single, to be saved. The islander with the fewest votes to save would be dumped from the island.
- ^Note 3: America voted for their favorite couple, with the five couples with the most votes being safe. The five saved boys then had to decide which vulnerable man to save, choosing Timmy, and the 5 saved girls had to decide which vulnerable woman to save, choosing Mady.
- ^Note 4: America voted for their favorite islanders. The top three boys and the top three girls who received the most votes were granted safety. The three safe girls then had to decide which vulnerable man to dump, choosing Bryce, and the three safe boys had to decide which vulnerable woman to dump, however Mady volunteered to leave the Villa instead.
- ^Note 5: As the final part for the Casa Amor twist in week 3, Casa Amor and the villa held two separate re-coupling ceremonies for the original islanders to choose whether to return to their previous partner or pick any new partner. Any of the 12 new islanders that remained single by the end of either ceremony was dumped from the villa. However, if one of the 12 original islanders remained single at the end of both ceremonies, they would still remain in the villa, but as a single islander. Avery, Gabby, Jordan, Sam, Tigerlily, and Tre remained single at the end the night, and were all dumped from the villa.
- ^Note 6: The two single boys, Jeff and Jesse, were allowed to couple up with any single girl. These girls included Nadja, Kat, Sydney and Deb. Jeff chose Nadja and Jesse chose Deb.
- ^Note 7: America voted for their favorite couples. Since Sydney, Kat, and Joel were single, they were granted immunity from the vote. The three couples who received the fewest votes were vulnerable. The two couples who received the fewest votes, Bella and Chazz, and Chanse and Jared were dumped from the Villa.
- ^Note 8: America voted for the most compatible couples. The top four couples who received the most votes were safe. The four safe girls then had to decide which vulnerable man to dump, choosing Joel, and the four safe boys had to decide which vulnerable woman to dump, however Mackenzie volunteered to leave the Villa instead.
- ^Note 9: Nadjha and Jeff volunteered to leave to the Villa, leaving three couples in the finale. America then voted for which couple they think should win Love Island. The couple with the most votes were declared the winners of Love Island and received the grand prize money.

== Episodes ==
No. overall	No. in season	Title	Day(s)	Original release date	Prod. code
Week 1
86	1	"Episode 1"	Day 1	July 19, 2022	401
87	2	"Episode 2"	Days 1–2	July 20, 2022	402
88	3	"Episode 3"	Days 2–3	July 21, 2022	403
89	4	"Episode 4"	Days 3–4	July 22, 2022	404
90	5	"Episode 5: Week 1 Recap"	N/A (Note: This episode showcased events from the previous days in the week. No new or present days were featured.)	July 23, 2022	405
91	6	"Episode 6"	Days 4–5	July 24, 2022	406
92	7	"Episode 7"	Days 5–6	July 26, 2022	407
93	8	"Episode 8"	Days 6–7	July 27, 2022	408
Week 2
94	9	"Episode 9"	Days 7–8	July 28, 2022	409
95	10	"Episode 10"	Days 8–9	July 29, 2022	410
96	11	"Episode 11: Unseen Bits"	N/A	July 30, 2022	411
97	12	"Episode 12"	Days 9–10	July 31, 2022	412
98	13	"Episode 13"	Days 10–11	August 2, 2022	413
99	14	"Episode 14"	Days 11–12	August 3, 2022	414
100	15	"Episode 15"	Days 12–13	August 4, 2022	415
101	16	"Episode 16"	Days 13–14	August 5, 2022	416
Week 3
102	17	"Episode 17: Unseen Bits"	N/A	August 6, 2022	417
103	18	"Episode 18"	Days 14–15	August 7, 2022	418
104	19	"Episode 19"	Days 15–16	August 8, 2022	419
105	20	"Episode 20"	Days 16–17	August 9, 2022	420
106	21	"Episode 21"	Days 17–18	August 10, 2022	421
107	22	"Episode 22"	Days 18–19	August 11, 2022	422
108	23	"Episode 23"	Days 19–20	August 12, 2022	423
109	24	"Episode 24: Unseen Bits"	N/A	August 13, 2022	424
110	25	"Episode 25"	Days 20–21	August 14, 2022	425
Week 4
111	26	"Episode 26"	Days 21–22	August 16, 2022	426
112	27	"Episode 27"	Days 22–23	August 17, 2022	427
113	28	"Episode 28"	Days 23–24	August 18, 2022	428
114	29	"Episode 29"	Days 24–25	August 19, 2022	429
115	30	"Episode 30: Unseen Bits"	N/A	August 20, 2022	430
116	31	"Episode 31"	Days 25–26	August 21, 2022	431
117	32	"Episode 32"	Days 26–27	August 23, 2022	432
118	33	"Episode 33"	Days 27–28	August 24, 2022	433
Week 5
119	34	"Episode 34"	Days 28–29	August 25, 2022	434
120	35	"Episode 35"	Days 30–31	August 26, 2022	435
121	36	"Episode 36: Unseen Bits"	N/A	August 27, 2022	436
122	37	"Episode 37"	Days 31–32	August 28, 2022	437
123	38	"Episode 38: Reunion"	N/A	September 1, 2022	438

== Release ==
The season premiered on July 19, 2022. One new episode of the season is released each day on Peacock until the season finale episode. Each new episode releases onto the platform at 9:00pm EST.
