= The Challenge: Vets & New Threats =

41st season of the reality television series

Vets & New Threats
- Season 41
- Presented by: T. J. Lavin
- No. of contestants: 33
- Winners: Olivia Kaiser; Yeremi Hykel
- Location: Santiago & Andes Mountains, Chile
- No. of episodes: 21 (including the two-part Reunion special)

Release
- Original network: MTV
- Original release: July 30 – December 17, 2025

Season chronology
- ← Previous; Battle of the Eras Next → Cutthroat

The Challenge: Vets & New Threats is the 41st season of the MTV reality competition series The Challenge, featuring alumni from Road Rules, The Real World, The Challenge, Are You the One?, Big Brother (U.S. and Australia), Survivor (U.S. and Turkey), Love Island (U.S. and UK), WWE, Too Hot to Handle, Cheer, Married at First Sight (UK), Canada's Ultimate Challenge, and boxing competing for a share of $500,000. A launch special titled "Day Zero" aired on July 23, 2025, followed by the season premiere on July 30, 2025.

== Format ==
Vets & New Threats features 16 "Vets" who have previously competed on The Challenge, and 16 "New Threats" making their debut on the series. The season has contestants competing in challenges as male-female pairs, each comprising one Vet and one New Threat (unless otherwise impossible). The initial pairs were determined by a draft after a special challenge during the "Day Zero" launch special.

From episodes 1–8, each episode is designated as either a male or female elimination cycle, with the first cycle determined by a coin toss:

- Daily challenges: Contestants compete in a challenge as male-female pairs. The winning team is immune and receives the power to either save another team from the elimination round (if contestant numbers are even) or nominate a team to potentially compete in the elimination round (if numbers are uneven). The last-place team is automatically sent to the elimination round, where the team member of the designated gender will compete.
- Nominations (The Judgement): Teams who did not win or place last in the daily challenge (collectively the "Jury") vote for a contestant of the designated gender to compete in the elimination round against the same-gender contestant from the last-place team.
  - For episodes where numbers are even, all non-immune contestants are eligible to be voted for.
  - For episodes where numbers are uneven, and as a result there is a Hangnail, the Jury vote between the Hangnail and the same-gender contestant from the team nominated by the daily challenge winners.
- Eliminations (The Arena): The contestant voted in by the Jury individually competes in an elimination round against the same-gender contestant from the last-place team. The winner remains in the competition while the defeated contestant is eliminated. Afterwards, new pairs are determined for the next cycle of the competition.

In episode 9, contestants competed in an individual challenge for a final chance to earn Performance Points, before choosing a partner for the rest of the season. From episodes 10–17, contestants compete in challenges and eliminations as pairs. The winners of daily challenges are immune while the last-place team is automatically sent to the Arena, where they compete against the team voted in at nominations. Afterwards, the final four teams compete in the Final Challenge to determine the champions of the season.

Twists

- The Selection: During the launch special, contestants had to race up and down a mountain to reach the cast accommodation for the season. Their placements determined the order they got to draft their initial partner ahead of the first daily challenge. Similarly, after each elimination in episode 1–7, contestants select a new partner for the next cycle in the order they placed in the daily challenge.
- Performance Points: From episodes 1–9, the top eight contestants/teams of daily challenges earn points based on their placements. Two points are also awarded to the winner of each elimination round, including wins by default. The points determined the order contestants select their teammate during the "Lock In", with ties broken based on who achieved higher placements.
  - The Lock In: At the end of episode 9, contestants select a partner for the "rest of the season," with the selection order determined by the amount of Performance Points they have.
- Hangnail: From episodes 1–8, a contestant whose partner was eliminated, and as a result there are uneven numbers for the next episode, is considered a "Hangnail". The Hangnail is not paired up for the next episode, does not compete in the daily challenge and automatically becomes the nominee for the Jury vote against the same-gender contestant nominated by the daily challenge winners.
- Stake a Claim: From episode 10, contestants have the chance to "claim" a new partner ahead of nominations, with only one claim available for each team. If a contestant uses the claim, they compete in a challenge against the current teammate of their desired partner. If they win, they form a new team with their desired partner, leaving the two former teammates to also form a new team. However, if the claimer loses, they and their original partner are automatically sent to the Arena in place of a nomination vote. The twist was also offered during the Final Challenge, albeit with no subsequent elimination round and teams were not beholden to one Vet and one New Threat.

== Contestants ==
Male contestants	Original season	Finish
Yeremi Hykel	The Amazing Race 35	Winner
Turabi "Turbo" Çamkıran	Survivor Turkey 8	Runner-up
Cedric Hodges	Big Brother 26	Third place
Theo Campbell	Love Island UK 3	Fourth place (Note: Adrienne & Theo were disqualified during the Final Challenge after falling significantly behind the other teams en route to the finish line.)
Justin Hinsley	Cheer	Episode 17
Will Gagnon	Are You the One? 9	Episode 16
Jake Cornish	Love Island UK 7	Episode 15
Leonardo "Leo" Dionicio	Love Island USA 5	Episode 14
Leroy Garrett	The Real World: Las Vegas (2011)	Episode 13
Derrick Kosinski	Road Rules: X-Treme	Episode 12
Gabe Wai	WWE	Episode 11
Chris "CT" Tamburello	The Real World: Paris	Episode 10
Derek Chavez	The Real World: Cancun	Episode 8
Ben Davis	Boxer and commentator	Episode 5
Johnny "Bananas" Devenanzio	The Real World: Key West	Episode 4
Rogan O'Connor	Ex on the Beach UK 2	Episode 1

Female contestants	Original season	Finish
Olivia Kaiser	Love Island USA 3	Winner
Sydney Segal	Survivor 41	Runner-up
Michaela Bradshaw	Survivor: Millennials vs. Gen X	Third place
Adrienne Naylor	Married at First Sight UK 8	Fourth place
Nany González	The Real World: Las Vegas (2011)	Episode 17
Aviv Melmed	Real World/Road Rules Challenge: Fresh Meat	Episode 16
Aneesa Ferreira	The Real World: Chicago	Episode 15
Ashley Mitchell	Real World: Ex-Plosion	Episode 14
America Lopez	Big Brother 25	Episode 13
Dee Valladares	Survivor 45	Episode 12
Jonna Mannion (Note: Prior to the "Dirtballer" challenge in episode 5, Cara Maria withdrew from the competition due to a family emergency. Jonna entered the competition as a replacement for Cara Maria.)	The Real World: Cancun	Episode 11
Tay Wilcoxson	Big Brother Australia 2023	Episode 10
Izzy Fairthorne	Too Hot to Handle 3	Episode 7
Ayoleka "Leka" Sodade	Canada's Ultimate Challenge 2	Episode 6
Cara Maria Sorbello	The Challenge: Fresh Meat II	Episode 5
Nia Moore	The Real World: Portland	Episode 3 (Note: In episode 3, because Nia had not yet received the results for an MRI scan for a knee injury, Gabe & Nia did not participate in the "Water Tower" challenge and were automatically declared the last-place team. Ahead of the Arena, Nia was medically removed from the competition. As a result, no Arena was held in this episode and America was declared the winner by default.)
Blue Kim	Big Brother 25	Episode 2

== Gameplay ==
=== Challenge games ===
- Mud Ball Madness: Twice during the challenge, a helicopter drops hundreds of colored balls into a mud pit. With both team members tethered together, teams must retrieve as many balls as they can and place them in their container outside the pit to score points. Different colored balls are worth different point values. The team that scores the most points wins while the team that scores the fewest points is automatically sent to the Arena.
  - Winners: Bananas & Dee
- Side by Side: Teams enter a giant pit which has side-by-side vehicles repeatedly speeding over the gap above. They must memorize a series of colored symbols located on the underside of the vehicles, which are only visible while the vehicles are mid-air, and replicate it using pieces at their station outside the pit. The first team to finish wins while the last-place team is automatically sent to the Arena.
  - Winners: Leka & Turbo
- Water Tower: One team member swims to a platform where they must solve a slide puzzle. Meanwhile, their partner must swim to a tall container with climbing holds on the outside, climb up to retrieve a flag, jump into the container and dive out the bottom before bringing the flag to the slide puzzle. Teams are disqualified from the challenge if the team member at the container falls off, or is unable to dive out. The team with the fastest time wins while the last-place team is automatically sent to the Arena.
  - Winners: Justin & Olivia
- Amazed: Held across two heats, teams must search a shipping container maze for a Sudoku puzzle, solve it, and return to the entrance. The further in a puzzle is, the easier it is to solve, and there is a 45-minute limit before teams time-out. The team with the fastest time wins while the last-place team is automatically sent to the Arena. If multiple teams time-out, last-place is determined by how many correct numbers teams placed on their puzzle.
  - Winners: Ben & Michaela
- Dirtballer: Inspired by the film Him, teams must dig up three goalposts, transport them across a 500-metre (547 yd) field and replant them in the ground to assemble a goal. Afterwards, one team member must kick a football and score a field goal. The first team to finish wins while the last-place team is automatically sent to the Arena.
  - Winners: Jake & Michaela
- Runes My Life: Teams must swim to a rope ladder, climb up to a structure and then climb down five connected pillars or nets to collect rune tiles. After collecting all five tiles, teams must solve a puzzle before swimming back to the start. Both team members must complete the challenge's components for a team's attempt to count, and teams time-out if they are unable to complete the challenge after a certain time. The team with the fastest time wins while the last-place team is automatically sent to the Arena. If multiple teams are unable to finish, last-place is determined by progress in the challenge made by both team members.
  - Winners: Leo & Sydney
- Drive Me Crazy: To begin, one team member drives a go-kart five laps around a racetrack. Once complete, their partner has five minutes to solve a puzzle. If they cannot solve the puzzle in this time, the driver must complete another five laps before they can continue solving for another five minutes. After solving a puzzle or timing out after 15 minutes, team members switch roles and repeat this process until they complete or time out all four puzzles. Afterwards, one team member must drive a final lap. The first team to finish wins while the last-place team is automatically sent to the Arena.
  - Winners: Leo & Nany
- Cyclone: Held across three heats, teams begin on a spinning container suspended above water, which has climbing holds mounted to the outside. Each team has five blocks which they attempt to transfer to a ledge at the top of the container. Once teams transfer all five blocks or have both team members fall into the water, they must swim to a platform to have their time stopped. The team with the most blocks transferred wins, with ties broken based on time to determine placements, while the last-place team is automatically sent to the Arena.
  - Winners: Sydney & Yeremi
- Broken Dreams: In a special challenge worth 1.5 times the usual Performance Points, contestants individually complete a "mini-final" up a six-mile (9.7 km) trail, which has five checkpoints along the way.
  - Checkpoint #1: Contestants must memorize symbols painted on rocks along the trail, match the symbols to numbers on a board then solve a math equation with the corresponding numbers.
  - Checkpoint #2: Contestants use the answer from the previous checkpoint to unlock a box containing an onion, garlic, ginger and a chilli pepper, which they must consume.
  - Checkpoint #3: Contestants must solve a puzzle tower by rotating a stack of puzzle pieces until they all line up.
  - Checkpoint #4: Contestants must hang sections of chain together to form ten chains of equal lengths.
  - Checkpoint #5: Contestants must solve a riddle and collect letters from half a mile (805 m) away, one at a time, to spell out the answer.
  - Winners: None (Note: In episode 9, the results of the "Broken Dreams" challenge were annulled and no Performance Points were awarded, as a result of several contestants cheating by discarding uneaten food during the second checkpoint.)
- Fast Thinking: Held across three heats, each team member begins on a stair climber machine over water, set to the lowest speed. In each heat, contestants are asked up to 18 multiple-choice trivia questions. If they answer a question incorrectly, the speed of their machine increases. Contestants are eliminated from the challenge and can no longer answer questions if they fall into the water or hold the machine to balance themselves. The team with the most correct answers wins, with ties broken based on time lasted on the machine, while the last-place team is automatically sent to the Arena.
  - Winners: Cedric & Michaela
- Band Together: Each team has a large pipe on a wooden structure. Teams race to a hill to collect items (such as barrels, tree stumps, and sandbags) with resistance bands attached to them, and use the bands to secure their pipe to the structure. Heavier items have bands with greater resistance. Once secured to support enough weight, one team member must walk across the pipe without falling to retrieve a flag at the other end. The first team to finish wins, while the last-place team is automatically sent to the Arena.
  - Winners: Dee & Derrick K.
- Running Man: Inspired by the film The Running Man. Teams collect a key and use it to unlock a shipping container wrapped in chains and ropes. They must then remove the chains and ropes to open the container and access a manual transmission car inside, before driving or pushing the car 200 yards (183 m) to a repair station. There, teams must use power tools to remove the hood of the car, collect a tracking device inside and deliver it to the finish line. The first team to finish wins while the last-place team is automatically sent the Arena.
  - Winners: Aviv & Yeremi
- Haystack Heist: With both team members tethered together, teams must collect hay bales and stack them to reach keys hanging from two 20-foot (6.1 m) poles at opposite ends of a field. After collecting both keys, teams must use them to unlock a chest located under a pile of hay bales. The first team to finish wins while the last-place team is automatically sent to the Arena.
  - Winners: Justin & Nany
- Rune Race: Teams must memorize a math equation written with rune symbols, run to a rune key and match the symbols with corresponding numbers in order to solve the equation. Teams then use their answer to unlock a cage of puzzle pieces submerged in a lake, return the pieces to their station and solve the puzzle. The first team to finish wins while the last-place team is automatically sent to the Arena.
  - Winners: Cedric & Michaela
- Dirty Drifter: One team member must unravel chains wrapped around a van and attach the van to a tow truck to stop their team's time. Teams are disqualified from the challenge if their partner helps. The tow truck then drives down a course and their partner attempts to steer the van around several obstacles. For each obstacle cleared, 30 seconds are deducted from team's time. The team with the fastest overall time wins while the last-place team is automatically sent to the Arena.
  - Winners: Olivia & Will
- Dark Mine: Teams follow a trail through a dark mine to their board listing thousands of numbers. There, teams must cross out numbers being announced from a speaker, using matches as their only light source. Teams can only take six matches at a time, but matches can be replenished at the entrance once depleted. Once teams believe they have finished, they must submit their board at the entrance. The team with the most correct numbers crossed out wins, with ties broken by submission order, while the last-place team is automatically sent to the Arena.
  - Winners: Sydney & Turbo
- Global Exchange: Each team has two halves of a world map located at opposite ends of a one-kilometre (0.62 mi) road. At each half are country names which teams attempt to label on the map. However, some of the countries must be transferred to the other half to correctly place. During each transfer, teams must ride BMX bikes while chained together, and teams can only take two countries at once. The team with the most correctly labelled countries wins while the last-place team is automatically sent to the Arena.
  - Winners: Sydney & Turbo

=== Arena games ===
- Inertia: Each contestant begins inside a giant wheel at the start of a track containing several humps. They must generate momentum to roll the wheel over the humps to reach the end of the track before returning to the start. The first contestant to finish wins.
  - Played by: Justin vs. Rogan
- Laser Focus: Played across three rounds, each round contestants play "offense" and "defense" once. Ten laser beams consecutively light up for a limited time within a circle. The offense contestant attempts to touch each beam before it turns off to earn a point, while the defense contestant attempts to block them. The contestant who scores the most points during their turn as offense wins the round. The first contestant to win two rounds wins the elimination.
  - Played by: Blue vs. Tay
- Hold 'Em Back: Contestants play as "offense" and "defense" once. The offense contestant must clip themself to one of three ropes, collect a token and deposit it into a container near the boundary of the Arena, repeating this process for each rope. Meanwhile, the defense player is located behind a wall at the ends of each rope, and attempts to pull the ropes back to prevent their opponent from depositing the tokens. Additionally, spectating contestants cannot give verbal assistance. The contestant who deposits all three tokens the fastest during their turn as offense wins.
  - Played by: Bananas vs. Gabe
- Him Collider: Inspired by the film Him. While holding a football, contestants must run through a circular hallway and pass through their opponent to deposit the ball in a container at the end. The first contestant to score in two out of three rounds wins, and also receives tickets to the world premiere of Him.
  - Played by: Ben vs. Derek C.
- Out of Time: Contestants must run up a ramp made of rollers, climb down a ladder and press a button at the end, before returning to press a button at the start to complete one lap. The contestant that completes the most laps in five minutes wins.
  - Played by: Leka vs. Olivia
- Pick It Up Again: Each contestant has five columns around the Arena. They must throw a ball into one of two chutes (at different heights) of a "gameboard", collect bricks and stack them on their columns while the ball rolls down the board, and catch the ball before it falls out the end. If contestants fail to catch the ball in time, the bricks they are carrying do not count. The first contestant to stack seven bricks on each of their columns wins.
  - Played by: Izzy vs. Tay
- Pole Wrestle: Contestants begin in the center of the Arena with both hands on a pole. The first contestant to wrestle the pole out of their opponent's hands twice wins.
  - Played by: CT vs. Derek C.
- Busting Balls: With each team given 50 balls, one team member is blindfolded and uses a ball launcher to fire the balls at 15 targets while their partner directs their aim. The team that hits the most targets wins, with ties broken based on time.
  - Played by: Adrienne & Theo vs. CT & Tay
- Pull It Together: One team member must climb up a cargo net to remove dozens of pegs from a climbing wall. Their partner must then place all the pegs into slots on another side of the wall, climb up and press a button at the top. The first team to finish wins.
  - Played by: Aviv & Yeremi vs. Gabe & Jonna
- Bad Dreams: Held across five rounds, contestants sit on a beam over a mud pit, facing the same-gender opponent from the opposing team. Each round, contestants use a pillow to try to knock their opponent into the mud or hit the pillow out of their opponent's hands. Teams win a round if both members win their matchup; the round ends a draw if both teams win one matchup, or no one wins a matchup after a prolonged time. The team that wins the most rounds wins the elimination. If the score is tied after five rounds, a coin toss is held to determine which gender competes in a tiebreaker round, where contestants stand on the beam instead of sitting.
  - Played by: Adrienne & Theo vs. Dee & Derrick K.
- Think Alike: Teams begin on a spinning platform and have two puzzles located off the side of the platform to solve as they briefly spin past. The first team to solve both puzzles wins. If neither team is able to finish after 45 minutes, the platform stops at the puzzles for one minute during the spins.
  - Played by: Adrienne & Theo vs. America & Leroy
- Weight Me Up: One team member must retrieve 35 cannonballs from outside the Arena, one at a time, and place them on a paddlewheel. With each deposit, the paddlewheel spins and raises their partner up a wall containing six discs with numbers on them. The first team to collect all six discs and correctly arrange them to form a magic triangle wins.
  - Played by: Ashley & Leo vs. Sydney & Turbo
- Loose Ends: Teams must unravel cable from a giant spool, loop the cable around a tree stump and plug the ends into three sockets at the other side of the Arena. The first team to finish wins.
  - Played by: Adrienne & Theo vs. Aneesa & Jake
- Tight Quarters: Each team enters an "airplane bathroom" where they must retrieve the pieces for two puzzles. The first team to solve both puzzles wins.
  - Played by: Aviv & Will vs. Cedric & Michaela
- Balls In 2.0: Each round, teams play both "offense" and "defense" once. Both members of the offense team have one attempt to deposit a ball into a goal (or enter the surrounding boundary) to score, while the same-gender opponent from the defense team attempts to block them and knock the ball out of bounds. The team that scores the most points wins the round. The first team to win two rounds wins.
  - Played by: Cedric & Michaela vs. Justin & Nany

=== Stake a Claim game ===
- Stake a Claim challenge: Contestants must run up a mountain and solve a three-dimensional puzzle before returning to the start. The first contestant to finish wins.
  - Played by: Gabe vs. Justin, Will vs. Yeremi

=== Final Challenge ===
For the Final Challenge, the final four teams undergo a race through the Andes Mountains with several checkpoints along the way. After completing each checkpoint, teams receive a key to unlock a chest at the finish line on the summit of a mountain. The first team to finish are declared the champions of Vets & New Threats and receives $425,000, second place receives $50,000, and third place receives $25,000.

Day one

Throughout the Final Challenge, team members must remain within a rope's length of each other (where applicable), and teams are penalized five minutes at the start of day two if they lose their rope.

- Checkpoint #1 (River Run): Teams kayak down a river and memorize seven relics placed along the riverbank. Once teams reach the end, they must arrange the names of the relics in the order they appeared. For each item in the wrong order, teams are imposed a two-minute penalty.
- Checkpoint #2 (Rune Memory): Teams must arrange ten rune symbols in order to match a hidden sequence. With each guess, teams are informed of how many of their symbols are in the correct position.
- Checkpoint #3 (Cube Alignment): Teams must arrange multicolored cubes in a grid to have each color appear once in each row and column. If teams are unable to finish after a certain time, they must carry two cubes with them to the next checkpoint.
- Checkpoint #4 (Stair Machine Joust): Once two teams arrive at the checkpoint, they compete to walk for the longest time on a stair climber machine. The team with at least one member still standing wins and boards a helicopter to the next checkpoint, while the losing team must compete against the next team to arrive. The team that loses the final matchup is imposed a 15-minute penalty.
- Checkpoint #5 (Strobe Pond): One team member must swim across a pond to collect a key located at a strobe light.
- Checkpoint #6 and Overnight Stage: Before the checkpoint, contestants are presented with the opportunity to Stake a Claim. Afterwards, one team member at a time may rest in a tent while their partner must stand on a log outside, and teams can switch places when desired. The team currently in first place must complete this for six hours before they can stop and spend the rest of the night at the campsite, second for seven hours, third for eight hours, and the fourth-place team must complete this for the entire night.

Day two

Continuing the Final Challenge, teams depart simultaneously unless if they have incurred a time penalty from losing their rope.

- Checkpoint #7: Team members must answer four biographical questions about their partner. The answers correspond to a four digit code which unlocks a box with their key. With each incorrect attempt, they must collect an envelope with the respective question (containing the correct answer) from the bottom of a crater before they can change an answer.
- Checkpoint #8: Once two teams arrive at the checkpoint, they alternate turns placing discs into a grid attempting to line up four in a row, much like Connect Four. The first team to line up four discs can continue to finish line while the losing team must compete against the next team to arrive. The team that loses the final matchup is imposed a 10-minute penalty.

Final results

- Winners: Olivia & Yeremi ($425,000)
- Runners-up: Sydney & Turbo ($50,000)
- Third place: Cedric & Michaela ($25,000)
- Fourth place: Adrienne & Theo (disqualified)

== Game summary ==
Episode		Gender	Winners	Saved	Hangnail	Winners' pick	Arena contestants		Arena game	Arena outcome	
#	Challenge	Gender	Winners	Saved	Hangnail	Winners' pick	Last-place	Voted in	Arena game	Winner	Eliminated
1	Mud Ball Madness	Male	Bananas & Dee	Izzy & Theo	—N/a		Adrienne & Rogan	Justin & Nia	Inertia	Justin	Rogan
2	Side by Side	Female	Leka & Turbo	—N/a	Adrienne	Derek C. & Tay	Blue & Derrick K.	Derek C. & Tay	Laser Focus	Tay	Blue
3	Water Tower	Female	Justin & Olivia	Izzy & Turbo	—N/a		Gabe & Nia	America & Bananas	—N/a		
4	Amazed	Male	Ben & Michaela	—N/a	Gabe	Derek C. & Izzy	Bananas & Leka	Gabe	Hold 'Em Back	Gabe	Bananas
5	Dirtballer	Male	Jake & Michaela	Jonna & Leo	—N/a		Dee & Derek C.	Ben & Olivia (Note: The episode 5, 14 and 16 nominations ended in a "stalemate" as the vote remained tied following a revote. As a result, a coin toss was held to determine which contestant/team would compete in the Arena.)	Him Collider	Derek C.	Ben
6	Runes My Life	Female	Leo & Sydney	—N/a	Olivia	Aneesa & Gabe	CT & Leka	Olivia	Out of Time	Olivia	Leka
7	Drive Me Crazy	Female	Leo & Nany	Ashley & Theo	—N/a		Tay & Yeremi	Izzy & Will	Pick It Up Again	Tay	Izzy
8	Cyclone	Male	Sydney & Yeremi	—N/a	Theo (Note: In episode 8, because Theo had not yet completed an MRI scan for a knee injury, he could not compete in the "Cyclone" challenge and was made the Hangnail by default. As a result, Will (the initial Hangnail for the episode) replaced Theo as Dee's partner.)	Aviv & Derek C.	CT & Michaela	Aviv & Derek C.	Pole Wrestle	CT	Derek C.
9	Broken Dreams	—N/a	—N/a	—N/a							
#	Challenge	—N/a	Winners	Stake a Claim			Arena contestants		Arena game	Arena outcome	
#	Challenge	—N/a	Winners	Claimer	Chosen	Winner	Last-place	Voted in	Arena game	Winners	Eliminated
10	Fast Thinking	—N/a	Cedric & Michaela	—N/a			CT & Tay	Adrienne & Theo	Busting Balls	Adrienne & Theo	CT & Tay
11	Band Together	—N/a	Dee & Derrick K.	Gabe & Jonna	Justin & Nany	Justin	Aviv & Yeremi	—N/a	Pull It Together	Aviv & Yeremi	Gabe & Jonna
12	Running Man	—N/a	Aviv & Yeremi	—N/a			Dee & Derrick K.	Adrienne & Theo	Bad Dreams	Adrienne & Theo	Dee & Derrick K.
13	Haystack Heist	—N/a	Justin & Nany	—N/a			America & Leroy	Adrienne & Theo	Think Alike	Adrienne & Theo	America & Leroy
14	Rune Race	—N/a	Cedric & Michaela	—N/a			Ashley & Leo	Sydney & Turbo	Weight Me Up	Sydney & Turbo	Ashley & Leo
15	Dirty Drifter	—N/a	Olivia & Will	—N/a			Adrienne & Theo	Aneesa & Jake	Loose Ends	Adrienne & Theo	Aneesa & Jake
16	Dark Mine	—N/a	Sydney & Turbo	Aviv & Yeremi	Olivia & Will	Yeremi	Cedric & Michaela	Aviv & Will	Tight Quarters	Cedric & Michaela	Aviv & Will
17	Global Exchange	—N/a	Sydney & Turbo	—N/a			Cedric & Michaela	Justin & Nany	Balls In 2.0	Cedric & Michaela	Justin & Nany
18/19	Final Challenge	—N/a	Olivia & Yeremi	2nd: Sydney & Turbo; 3rd: Cedric & Michaela; 4th: Adrienne & Theo							

=== Elimination progress ===
Contestants	Episodes																	
Contestants	1	2	3	4	5	6	7	8	9	10	11	12	13	14	15	16	17	Finale
Olivia	SAFE	SAFE	WIN	SAFE	SAFE	ELIM	SAFE	SAFE	SAFE	SAFE	SAFE	SAFE	SAFE	SAFE	WIN	SAFE	SAFE	WINNER
Yeremi	SAFE	SAFE	SAFE	SAFE	SAFE	SAFE	SAFE	WIN	SAFE	SAFE	ELIM	WIN	SAFE	SAFE	SAFE	WON	SAFE	WINNER
Sydney	SAFE	SAFE	SAFE	SAFE	SAFE	WIN	SAFE	WIN	SAFE	SAFE	SAFE	SAFE	SAFE	ELIM	SAFE	WIN	WIN	SECOND
Turbo	SAFE	WIN	SAVE	SAFE	SAFE	SAFE	SAFE	SAFE	SAFE	SAFE	SAFE	SAFE	SAFE	ELIM	SAFE	WIN	WIN	SECOND
Cedric	SAFE	SAFE	SAFE	SAFE	SAFE	SAFE	SAFE	SAFE	SAFE	WIN	SAFE	SAFE	SAFE	WIN	SAFE	ELIM	ELIM	THIRD
Michaela	SAFE	SAFE	SAFE	WIN	WIN	SAFE	SAFE	SAFE	SAFE	WIN	SAFE	SAFE	SAFE	WIN	SAFE	ELIM	ELIM	THIRD
Adrienne	SAFE	RISK	SAFE	SAFE	SAFE	SAFE	SAFE	SAFE	SAFE	ELIM	SAFE	ELIM	ELIM	SAFE	ELIM	SAFE	SAFE	FOURTH
Theo	SAVE	SAFE	SAFE	SAFE	SAFE	SAFE	SAVE	RISK	SAFE	ELIM	SAFE	ELIM	ELIM	SAFE	ELIM	SAFE	SAFE	FOURTH
Justin	ELIM	SAFE	WIN	SAFE	SAFE	SAFE	SAFE	SAFE	SAFE	SAFE	WON	SAFE	WIN	SAFE	SAFE	SAFE	OUT	
Nany	SAFE	SAFE	SAFE	SAFE	SAFE	SAFE	WIN	SAFE	SAFE	SAFE	SAFE	SAFE	WIN	SAFE	SAFE	SAFE	OUT	
Aviv	SAFE	SAFE	SAFE	SAFE	SAFE	SAFE	SAFE	SAFE	SAFE	SAFE	ELIM	WIN	SAFE	SAFE	SAFE	OUT		
Will	SAFE	SAFE	SAFE	SAFE	SAFE	SAFE	SAFE	SAFE	SAFE	SAFE	SAFE	SAFE	SAFE	SAFE	WIN	LOST		
Aneesa	SAFE	SAFE	SAFE	SAFE	SAFE	RISK	SAFE	SAFE	SAFE	SAFE	SAFE	SAFE	SAFE	SAFE	OUT			
Jake	SAFE	SAFE	SAFE	SAFE	WIN	SAFE	SAFE	SAFE	SAFE	SAFE	SAFE	SAFE	SAFE	SAFE	OUT			
Ashley	SAFE	SAFE	SAFE	SAFE	SAFE	SAFE	SAVE	SAFE	SAFE	SAFE	SAFE	SAFE	SAFE	OUT				
Leo	SAFE	SAFE	SAFE	SAFE	SAVE	WIN	WIN	SAFE	SAFE	SAFE	SAFE	SAFE	SAFE	OUT				
America	SAFE	SAFE	NOM	SAFE	SAFE	SAFE	SAFE	SAFE	SAFE	SAFE	SAFE	SAFE	OUT					
Leroy	SAFE	SAFE	SAFE	SAFE	SAFE	SAFE	SAFE	SAFE	SAFE	SAFE	SAFE	SAFE	OUT					
Dee	WIN	SAFE	SAFE	SAFE	SAFE	SAFE	SAFE	SAFE	SAFE	SAFE	WIN	OUT						
Derrick K.	SAFE	SAFE	SAFE	SAFE	SAFE	SAFE	SAFE	SAFE	SAFE	SAFE	WIN	OUT						
Gabe	SAFE	SAFE	SAFE	ELIM	SAFE	SAFE	SAFE	SAFE	SAFE	SAFE	LOST							
Jonna	—N/a				SAVE	SAFE	SAFE	SAFE	SAFE	SAFE	OUT							
CT	SAFE	SAFE	SAFE	SAFE	SAFE	SAFE	SAFE	ELIM	SAFE	OUT								
Tay	SAFE	ELIM	SAFE	SAFE	SAFE	SAFE	ELIM	SAFE	SAFE	OUT								
Derek C.	SAFE	SAFE	SAFE	RISK	ELIM	SAFE	SAFE	OUT										
Izzy	SAVE	SAFE	SAVE	SAFE	SAFE	SAFE	OUT											
Leka	SAFE	WIN	SAFE	SAFE	SAFE	OUT												
Ben	SAFE	SAFE	SAFE	WIN	OUT													
Cara Maria	SAFE	SAFE	SAFE	SAFE	QUIT													
Bananas	WIN	SAFE	SAFE	OUT														
Nia	SAFE	SAFE	MED															
Blue	SAFE	OUT																
Rogan	OUT																	

Color key
The contestant won the Final Challenge
The contestant lost the Final Challenge
The contestant was disqualified during the Final Challenge
The contestant won the daily challenge and was immune from elimination
The contestant was saved from elimination by the daily challenge winners
The contestant was not selected for the Arena
The contestant was either the Hangnail or was selected for the Arena by the daily challenge winners, but was ultimately not voted in
The contestant was nominated for the Arena, but did not have to compete
The contestant won the elimination round
The contestant lost the elimination round and was eliminated
The contestant lost the "Stake a Claim" challenge, subsequently lost in the elimination round and was eliminated
The contestant won the "Stake a Claim" challenge
The contestant was medically removed from the competition
The contestant withdrew from the competition

=== Performance Points progress ===
Contestant	Episodes									Total
Contestant	1	2	3	4	5	6	7	8	9	Total
Olivia	5	7	8	6	0	2	0	5	0	33
Yeremi	7	0	5	6	2	5	0	8	0	33
Sydney	2	0	6	5	1	8	2	8	0	32
Turbo	0	8	0	5	7	4	0	1	0	25
Cedric	5	3	7	0	4	6	1	4	0	30
Michaela	4	2	7	8	8	5	4	0	0	38
Adrienne	0	0	0	7	7	7	0	7	0	28
Theo	6	0	0	0	0	0	0	0	0	6
Justin	1	5	8	0	0	3	4	2	0	25
Nany	0	0	4	0	0	0	8	4	0	16
Aviv	7	0	0	0	6	6	3	0	0	22
Will	4	7	4	3	6	1	5	3	0	33
Aneesa	0	5	5	3	4	0	7	6	0	30
Jake	0	0	1	0	8	0	0	6	0	15
Ashley	3	3	1	1	2	1	0	2	0	13
Leo	0	2	0	1	0	8	8	5	0	24
America	0	6	5	0	3	2	6	0	0	22
Leroy	2	0	0	4	3	0	0	0	0	9
Dee	8	0	0	0	0	3	0	3	0	14
Derrick K.	0	0	2	0	0	2	2	7	0	13
Gabe	3	0	0	2	5	0	3	0	0	13
Jonna	—N/a				0	0	1	1	0	2
CT	0	6	0	7	1	0	7	2	0	23
Tay	0	2	2	4	0	4	2	0	0	14
Derek C.	0	0	6	2	2	7	6	0		23
Izzy	6	4	0	2	0	0	5			17
Leka	0	8	0	0	5	0				13
Ben	0	1	0	8	0					9
Cara Maria	0	0	0	0						0
Bananas	8	4	3	0						15
Nia	1	1	0							2
Blue	0	0								0
Rogan	0									0

== Team progress ==
After each elimination from episodes 1–8, contestants selected a new partner for the next episode. Each team had to comprise one Vet and one New Threat and contestants could not select a teammate they already partnered with, unless otherwise impossible due to uneven numbers or other restrictions. After a one-off individual challenge in episode 9, teams were "locked in" from episode 10, but could still change with the Stake a Claim twist.

Contestants	Episodes																
Contestants	1	2	3	4	5	6	7	8	10	11	12	13	14	15	16	17	18/19
Olivia	Cedric	Will	Justin	Yeremi	Ben	—N/a	Jake	Leo	Will						Yeremi		
Yeremi	Aviv	Nany	Aneesa	Olivia	Ashley	Michaela	Tay	Sydney	Aviv						Olivia		
Sydney	Leroy	Theo	Derek C.	Turbo	CT	Leo	Derrick K.	Yeremi	Turbo								
Turbo	America	Leka	Izzy	Sydney	Adrienne	Tay	Dee	Jonna	Sydney								
Cedric	Olivia	Ashley	Michaela	Cara Maria	Aneesa	Aviv	Jonna	Nany	Michaela								
Michaela	Will	Leo	Cedric	Ben	Jake	Yeremi	Justin	CT	Cedric								
Adrienne	Rogan	—N/a	Theo	CT	Turbo	Derek C.	Leroy	Derrick K.	Theo								
Theo	Izzy	Sydney	Adrienne	America	Tay	Nany	Ashley	~~Dee~~	Adrienne								
Justin	Nia	Aneesa	Olivia	Aviv	Nany	Dee	Michaela	Ashley	Nany								
Nany	Ben	Yeremi	Will	Jake	Justin	Theo	Leo	Cedric	Justin								
Aviv	Yeremi	Jake	Leo	Justin	Will	Cedric	Gabe	Derek C.	Yeremi						Will		
Will	Michaela	Olivia	Nany	Aneesa	Aviv	Ashley	Izzy	Dee	Olivia						Aviv		
Aneesa	Leo	Justin	Yeremi	Will	Cedric	Gabe	CT	Jake	Jake								
Jake	Cara Maria	Aviv	Ashley	Nany	Michaela	Jonna	Olivia	Aneesa	Aneesa								
Ashley	Gabe	Cedric	Jake	Leo	Yeremi	Will	Theo	Justin	Leo								
Leo	Aneesa	Michaela	Aviv	Ashley	Jonna	Sydney	Nany	Olivia	Ashley								
America	Turbo	CT	Bananas	Theo	Leroy	Derrick K.	Derek C.	Gabe	Leroy								
Leroy	Sydney	Dee	Leka	Tay	America	Izzy	Adrienne	Tay	America								
Dee	Bananas	Leroy	CT	Derrick K.	Derek C.	Justin	Turbo	Will	Derrick K.								
Derrick K.	Leka	Blue	Tay	Dee	Izzy	America	Sydney	Adrienne	Dee								
Gabe	Ashley	Cara Maria	Nia	—N/a	Leka	Aneesa	Aviv	America	Jonna								
Jonna	—N/a				Leo	Jake	Cedric	Turbo	Gabe								
CT	Tay	America	Dee	Adrienne	Sydney	Leka	Aneesa	Michaela	Tay								
Tay	CT	Derek C.	Derrick K.	Leroy	Theo	Turbo	Yeremi	Leroy	CT								
Derek C.	Blue	Tay	Sydney	Izzy	Dee	Adrienne	America	Aviv									
Izzy	Theo	Bananas	Turbo	Derek C.	Derrick K.	Leroy	Will										
Leka	Derrick K.	Turbo	Leroy	Bananas	Gabe	CT											
Ben	Nany	Nia	Cara Maria	Michaela	Olivia												
Cara Maria	Jake	Gabe	Ben	Cedric	~~Leo~~												
Bananas	Dee	Izzy	America	Leka													
Nia	Justin	Ben	Gabe														
Blue	Derek C.	Derrick K.															
Rogan	Adrienne																

Includes results from the Stake a Claim twist where used.

== Voting progress ==
Winners' vote	—N/a	**Derek C. & Tay**; 2 of 2 votes	—N/a	**Derek C. & Izzy**; 2 of 2 votes	—N/a		**Aneesa & Gabe**; 2 of 2 votes	—N/a	**Aviv & Derek C.** 2 of 2 votes	—N/a						
House vote	**Justin**; 8 of 14 votes	**Tay**; 11 of 12 votes	**America**; 9 of 13 votes	**Gabe**; 11 of 11 votes	Tie	**Ben**; Stalemate	**Olivia**; 6 of 10 votes	**Izzy**; 4 of 11 votes	**Derek C.** 8 of 9 votes	**Adrienne & Theo**; 5 of 10 votes	**Adrienne & Theo**; 5 of 8 votes	**Adrienne & Theo**; 4 of 7 votes	**Sydney & Turbo**; Stalemate	**Aneesa & Jake**; 4 of 5 votes	**Aviv & Will**; Stalemate	**Justin & Nany**; 3 of 3 votes
Voter	Episodes															
Voter	1	2	3	4	5		6	7	8	10	12	13	14	15	16	17
Olivia	Justin	Tay	—N/a	Gabe	Yeremi	Yeremi	—N/a	Sydney	Derek C.	Dee & Derrick K.	America & Leroy	Sydney & Turbo	Sydney & Turbo	—N/a	Justin & Nany	Justin & Nany
Yeremi	Jake	Tay	Tay	Gabe	Ben	Ben	Olivia	—N/a	**Aviv & Derek C.**	Adrienne & Theo	—N/a	Adrienne & Theo	Adrienne & Theo	Aneesa & Jake	Justin & Nany	Justin & Nany
Sydney	Jake	Tay	America	Gabe	Ben	Ben	**Aneesa & Gabe**	Izzy	**Aviv & Derek C.**	Gabe & Jonna	Adrienne & Theo	Adrienne & Theo	Adrienne & Theo	Aneesa & Jake	—N/a	
Turbo	Justin	**Derek C. & Tay**	America	Gabe	Yeremi	Yeremi	Aneesa	Izzy	Theo	Gabe & Jonna	Adrienne & Theo	Adrienne & Theo	Adrienne & Theo	Aneesa & Jake	—N/a	
Cedric	Justin	Tay	Tay	Gabe	Justin	Yeremi	Olivia	Izzy	Derek C.	—N/a	Adrienne & Theo	Adrienne & Theo	—N/a	Aneesa & Jake	—N/a	
Michaela	Jake	Tay	Tay	**Derek C. & Izzy**	—N/a		Olivia	Izzy	—N/a	—N/a	Adrienne & Theo	Adrienne & Theo	—N/a	Aneesa & Jake	—N/a	
Adrienne	—N/a		America	Gabe	Yeremi	Yeremi	Aneesa	Jonna	Derek C.	Dee & Derrick K.	America & Leroy	Sydney & Turbo	Sydney & Turbo	—N/a	Aviv & Will	Justin & Nany
Theo	Justin	Tay	America	Gabe	Yeremi	Yeremi	Aneesa	Aneesa	—N/a	Dee & Derrick K.	America & Leroy	Sydney & Turbo	Sydney & Turbo	—N/a	Aviv & Will	Justin & Nany
Justin	Jake	Tay	—N/a	Gabe	Ben	Ben	Olivia	Izzy	Derek C.	Adrienne & Theo	Adrienne & Theo	—N/a	Adrienne & Theo	Aneesa & Jake	Aviv & Will	Justin & Nany
Nany	Jake	Tay	America	Gabe	Ben	Ben	Aneesa	—N/a	Derek C.	Adrienne & Theo	Adrienne & Theo	—N/a	Adrienne & Theo	Aneesa & Jake	Aviv & Will	Justin & Nany
Aviv	Jake	Tay	America	Gabe	Ben	Ben	Olivia	Jonna	—N/a	Adrienne & Theo	—N/a	Adrienne & Theo	Adrienne & Theo	Aneesa & Jake	Justin & Nany	
Will	Jake	Tay	America	Gabe	Ben	Ben	Olivia	Jonna	Derek C.	Dee & Derrick K.	America & Leroy	Sydney & Turbo	Sydney & Turbo	—N/a	Justin & Nany	
Aneesa	Justin	Tay	Tay	Gabe	Justin	Yeremi	—N/a	Dee	Derek C.	Gabe & Jonna	America & Leroy	Sydney & Turbo	Sydney & Turbo	Sydney & Turbo		
Jake	Justin	Tay	America	Gabe	—N/a		Aneesa	Sydney	Derek C.	Gabe & Jonna	America & Leroy	Sydney & Turbo	Sydney & Turbo	Sydney & Turbo		
Ashley	Jake	Tay	America	Gabe	Ben	Ben	Olivia	Aneesa	Derek C.	Adrienne & Theo	Adrienne & Theo	Adrienne & Theo	—N/a			
Leo	Justin	Tay	America	Gabe	Yeremi	Yeremi	**Aneesa & Gabe**	—N/a	Derek C.	Adrienne & Theo	Adrienne & Theo	Adrienne & Theo	—N/a			
America	Justin	Adrienne	Tay	Gabe	Ben	Ben	Olivia	Dee	Derek C.	Adrienne & Theo	Adrienne & Theo	—N/a				
Leroy	Jake	Tay	Tay	Gabe	Ben	Ben	Olivia	Jonna	Derek C.	Adrienne & Theo	Adrienne & Theo	—N/a				
Dee	—N/a	Tay	America	Gabe	—N/a		Olivia	Izzy	Derek C.	Adrienne & Theo	—N/a					
Derrick K.	Justin	—N/a	America	Gabe	Yeremi	Yeremi	Olivia	Izzy	Derek C.	Adrienne & Theo	—N/a					
Gabe	Jake	Tay	—N/a		Gabe	Ben	—N/a	Jonna	Derek C.	Aneesa & Jake						
Jonna	—N/a				Yeremi	Yeremi	Aneesa	Izzy	Theo	Aneesa & Jake						
CT	Justin	Adrienne	America	Gabe	Ben	Ben	—N/a	Dee	—N/a	—N/a						
Tay	Justin	—N/a	America	Gabe	Yeremi	Yeremi	Aneesa	—N/a	Derek C.	—N/a						
Derek C.	Justin	—N/a	America	—N/a			Aneesa	Dee	—N/a							
Izzy	Justin	Tay	America	—N/a	Yeremi	Yeremi	Olivia	Jonna								
Leka	Justin	**Derek C. & Tay**	Tay	—N/a	Gabe	Ben	—N/a									
Ben	Jake	Tay	America	**Derek C. & Izzy**	Yeremi	Yeremi										
Cara Maria	Justin	Tay	America	Gabe												
Bananas	—N/a	Tay	Tay	—N/a												
Nia	Jake	Tay	—N/a													
Blue	Justin	—N/a														
Rogan	—N/a															

Bold indicates the winning team's vote

== Episodes ==
No. overall	No. in season	Title	Original release date	US viewers (millions)
565	1	"Welcome to The Challenge"	July 30, 2025	0.24
566	2	"We Used to Hook Up"	August 6, 2025	0.25
567	3	"I Am The Challenge"	August 13, 2025	0.32
568	4	"Wish I'd Been Practicing"	August 20, 2025	0.59
569	5	"Pride Comes Before the Fall"	August 27, 2025	0.30
570	6	"Is He Throwing It?"	September 3, 2025	0.36
571	7	"At Least Someone's Getting Laid!"	September 10, 2025	0.41
572	8	"Justice for Leka"	September 17, 2025	0.21
573	9	"Does Anyone Want to Confess?"	September 24, 2025	0.31
574	10	"A War Brewing"	October 1, 2025	0.31
575	11	"A King of Kamikaze"	October 8, 2025	0.24
576	12	"Punch You in Your Face"	October 15, 2025	0.24
577	13	"They Are Like Cockroaches"	October 22, 2025	0.24
578	14	"We Have to Boogie!"	October 29, 2025	0.27
579	15	"The Best Birthday Present"	November 5, 2025	0.30
580	16	"Am I Being Bamboozled?"	November 12, 2025	0.32
581	17	"Ten Toes Down"	November 19, 2025	0.32
582	18	"Finale Part I"	November 26, 2025	0.24
583	19	"Finale Part II"	December 3, 2025	0.35

=== Reunion special ===
The two-part reunion special aired on December 10 and December 17, 2025 and was hosted by The Real World: Brooklyn alumna Devyn Simone. The reunion was filmed in October 2025 in Amsterdam, Netherlands.
