= Love Island Games =

Reality competition series

- Genre: Reality
- Presented by: Maya Jama; Ariana Madix; Maura Higgins
- Narrated by: Iain Stirling
- Original language: English
- No. of seasons: 2
- No. of episodes: 37

Original release
- Network: Peacock
- Release: November 1, 2023 – present

Related
- Love Island franchise

Love Island Games is a spin-off of the reality dating series Love Island. It features previous Love Island contestants from various countries competing in challenges. The show premiered on November 1, 2023 and was released on Peacock in the United States. It is hosted by Ariana Madix and narrated by Iain Stirling. Season one was hosted by Maya Jama.

== Hosts ==
Color key

Host/Narrator
Guest/Guest Host

Hosts	Season		
Hosts	1	2	3
Maya Jama			
Ariana Madix			
Maura Higgins (Aftersun)			
Iain Stirling (Narrator)			

== Production ==
In April 2023, it was reported that Love Island Games, a spin-off of the reality dating franchise Love Island had been commissioned by American streaming service Peacock. The series was developed as an international all-stars edition, bringing together notable contestants from various global versions of the franchise, including the UK, USA, Australia, and other territories, marking the first time the format had united islanders across multiple countries in one competition. August 2023, Maya Jama, who has presented the British version of the show since its ninth series, was announced as the show's host. Iain Stirling who has narrated the British version since its inception and American version since its fourth season, was announced as narrator. The series began filming in Fiji in September 2023, with the villa specially adapted to accommodate both romantic and competitive elements, and began broadcasting on November 1, 2023. Episodes were released six days a week on Peacock, with a schedule similar to other Love Island editions, allowing for near real-time audience engagement. Maura Higgins, who was a contestant on the fifth series of the British version, served as the show's social media ambassador, providing exclusive behind-the-scenes content, interviews, and updates across digital platforms.

Following the conclusion of the sixth season of the American version, it was announced in August 2025 that the series had been renewed for a second season with Ariana Madix set to replace Jama, reflecting strong viewership and fan interest in the competitive spin-off format.

On May 11, 2026, it was announced that the series would return for a third season with Madix set to return as host.

== Format ==
Love Island Games will see former islanders from across the globe return to the villa, ready for "another shot at love". They will meet new bombshells, recouple and face elimination, while also facing new twists that will give a competitive spin to their time in the villa - including team challenges, couples challenges, and duels for their spot in the Villa. In addition to the traditional coupling format, contestants compete in physical and strategic games designed to test both their compatibility and competitiveness, with performance in challenges influencing their safety and power within the villa. Islanders may win immunity, advantages, or the ability to affect other couples’ standings, adding a strategic layer not present in the original series. Eliminations can occur through a combination of challenge results, recouplings, and decisions made by fellow contestants, increasing unpredictability. The season ultimately culminates in a final where one couple is crowned the winner of Love Island Games, often receiving a cash prize and the title as the strongest couple in both love and competition.

== Location ==
=== Fiji ===
The first season was filmed at the villa used in the fifth season of Love Island USA in Fiji. The second season was filmed at the same villa from the sixth and seventh season of Love Island USA.

== Series overview ==
Season	Islanders	Days	Location	Host	Episodes	Originally released			Winners	Runners-up
Season	Islanders	Days	Location	Host	Episodes	First released	Last released	Network	Winners	Runners-up
1	26	17	Fiji	Maya Jama	19	November 1, 2023	November 20, 2023	Peacock	Jack Fowler & Justine Ndiba	Aurelia Lamprecht & Johnny Middlebrooks
2	21	15	Fiji	Ariana Madix	18	September 16, 2025	October 5, 2025	Peacock	Isaiah Campbell & Lucinda Strafford	Justine Ndiba & Tyrique Hyde
