= Love Island USA season 6 =

2024 season of Love Island USA

Love Island USA
- Season 6
- Promotional poster for the season
- Hosted by: Ariana Madix
- No. of days: 32
- No. of contestants: 33
- Winners: Kordell Beckham; Serena Page
- Runners-up: Leah Kateb; Miguel Harichi
- No. of episodes: 37

Release
- Original network: Peacock
- Original release: June 11 – August 19, 2024

Season chronology
- ← Previous; Season 5 Next → Season 7

The sixth season of the American version of the television reality program Love Island premiered on June 11, 2024. The season was hosted by Ariana Madix; and for the first time in the American version of Love Island, there was an Aftersun, which was hosted by Maura Higgins.

== Format ==
Love Island is a reality television program in which a group of contestants, who are referred to as "Islanders", are living in a villa in Fiji. The Islanders are cut off from the outside world and are under constant video surveillance. To survive in the villa, the Islanders must be in a relationship with another Islander. The Islanders couple up for the first time on first impressions but they are later forced to "re-couple" at special ceremonies in which they can choose to remain with their current partners or to switch partners. At the villa, the couples must share a bed for sleeping and are permitted to talk with other Islanders at any time, allowing them to get to know everyone. While in the villa, each Islander has his or her own telephone, with which they can contact other Islanders via text and can receive text messages informing them of the latest challenges, dumpings, and re-couplings. While the Islanders might appear to have unmediated access to the outside world, they are limited in both their alcohol consumption and communication with the outside world.

The Islanders are presented with many games and challenges that are designed to test their physical and mental abilities, after which the winners are sometimes presented with special prizes, such as a night at the Hideaway or a special date.

Islanders can be eliminated, or "dumped", for several reasons; these include remaining single after a re-coupling and by public vote through the Love Island mobile app. During the show's final week, members of the public vote to decide which couple should win the series; the couple who receive the most votes win.

Often times, new contestants, called "bombshells" will enter the villa and are given the chance to "couple" with the current contestants, usually within a 24 hour time period. This is to create tension between islanders as there is a risk of becoming single and the chance of being dumped from the island.

At the envelope ceremony on finale night, the couple who received the highest number of votes from the public receive two envelopes, one for each partner. One envelope contains $100,000 and the other contains nothing. The partner with the $100,000 envelope may choose whether to share the money with his or her partner as a test of trust and commitment.

== Islanders ==
The original islanders of the sixth season of Love Island USA. Left to right: Serena, Kendall, Leah, Rob, JaNa, Coye, Kaylor, Aaron, Hannah and Kordell

The original islanders were announced on June 4, 2024.

Islanders include Rob Rausch, who previously appeared on the previous season as a Casa Amor bombshell, Aaron Evans, who won season 1 of The Traitors UK, and Kordell Beckham, who is the younger brother of Odell Beckham Jr.

Kassy Castillo and Harrison Luna, who were contestants on the previous season, returned as bombshells.

Islander	Age	Hometown	Entered	Exited	Status	Ref
Kordell Beckham	22	Dallas, Texas	Day 1	Day 32	Winner	
Serena Page	24	Houston, Texas	Day 1	Day 32	Winner	
Leah Kateb	25	Bell Canyon, California	Day 1	Day 32	Runner-up	
Miguel Harichi	27	Camden Town, United Kingdom	Day 9	Day 32	Runner-up	
JaNa Craig	27	Las Vegas, Nevada	Day 1	Day 32	Third place	
Kenneth "Kenny" Rodriguez	24	Bronx, New York	Day 13	Day 32	Third place	
Kendall Washington	27	San Diego, California	Day 1	Day 32	Fourth place	
Nicole Jacky	26	Reno, Nevada	Day 6	Day 32	Fourth place	
Kassandra "Kassy" Castillo	23	Fort Worth, Texas	Day 27	Day 30	Dumped	
Robert "Rob" Rausch	25	Florence, Alabama	Day 1	Day 30	Dumped	
Aaron Evans	26	North Devon, United Kingdom	Day 1	Day 30	Dumped	
Kaylor Martin	22	Connellsville, Pennsylvania	Day 1	Day 30	Dumped	
Daniela Ortiz-Rivera	22	Longwood, Florida	Day 17	Day 27	Dumped	
Harrison Luna	27	Adelaide, Australia	Day 24	Day 27	Dumped	
Sierra Mills	22	San Marcos, California	Day 17	Day 27	Dumped	
Caine Bacon	28	Norwich, United Kingdom	Day 17	Day 25	Dumped	
Catherine Marshall	24	Hillsboro, Oregon	Day 17	Day 24	Dumped	
Daia McGhee	27	Los Angeles, California	Day 17	Day 24	Dumped	
Olivia "Liv" Walker	21	Sydney, Australia	Day 2	Day 24	Dumped	
Destiny Herzog	22	Scottsdale, Arizona	Day 17	Day 20	Dumped	
George Vining	23	Athens, Georgia	Day 17	Day 20	Dumped	
Ignacio Ferrari	28	Buenos Aires, Argentina	Day 17	Day 20	Dumped	
Jacobi Graham	23	Gonzales, Louisiana	Day 17	Day 20	Dumped	
Jalen Oliver	24	Hagerstown, Indiana	Day 17	Day 20	Dumped	
Josiah Roebuck	25	Saint Thomas, U.S. Virgin Islands	Day 17	Day 20	Dumped	
Sydney Leighton	24	Rumson, New Jersey	Day 17	Day 20	Dumped	
Nigel Okafor	28	Ann Arbor, Michigan	Day 13	Day 16	Dumped	
Cassidy Laudano	27	Chicago, Illinois	Day 13	Day 16	Dumped	
Connor Newsum	28	Santa Monica, California	Day 2	Day 15	Dumped	
Andrea Carmona	25	Miami, Florida	Day 6	Day 11	Dumped	
Hakeem White	29	Miami, Florida	Day 2	Day 11	Dumped	
Hannah Smith	26	Concord, North Carolina	Day 1	Day 10	Dumped	
Coye Simmons	28	Winston-Salem, North Carolina	Day 1	Day 4	Dumped	

=== Future appearances ===
In 2025, Aaron Evans, Connor Newsum, JaNa Craig, Kaylor Martin, Kendall Washington, Kenny Rodriguez, Leah Kateb, Liv Walker, Miguel Harichi and Serena Page all starred in the spinoff Love Island: Beyond the Villa. Cassidy Laudano, Harrison Luna, Kordell Beckham, and Nicole Jacky all made guest appearances. Craig later competed on the first season of Destination X. Andrea Carmona and Washington competed on season two of Love Island Games.

In 2026, Rob Rausch won the fourth season of The Traitors US. Rodriguez competed on the sixth season of La casa de los famosos. Kassy Castillo appeared on season four of Perfect Match. Martin is set to compete on the second season of Destination X.

In 2027, Craig is set to compete in the sixth season of The Traitors US, notably competing alongside Love Island narrator Iain Stirling.

== Production ==
On November 16, 2023, Peacock renewed the series for a sixth and seventh season. Ariana Madix took over as host, replacing Sarah Hyland. Iain Stirling returns as the narrator, and Maura Higgins was announced as the host for Love Island USA Aftersun. Season 2 finalist Cely Vasquez joined as social media ambassador, bringing all the behind the scenes gossip and interviews.

== Coupling and elimination history ==
	Week 1			Week 2			Week 3			Week 4			Week 5		
	Day 1	Day 2	Day 4	Day 8	Day 10	Day 11	Day 15	Day 16	Day 20	Day 24	Day 25	Day 27	Day 30	Final	
Kordell	Serena		Serena		Serena	Safe	Serena	Rob to save	Daia	Serena		Safe	Finalist	Split the 100k	Winner (Day 32)
Serena	Kordell		Kordell		Kordell	Safe	Kordell	Liv to save	Single	Kordell		Safe	Finalist	Winner (Day 32)	
Leah	Rob	Single	Rob	Single	Connor	Safe	Miguel	Liv to save	Single	Miguel		Safe	Finalist	Runner-up (Day 32)	
Miguel	Not in Villa				Liv	Immune	Leah	Rob to save	Sierra	Leah		Safe	Finalist	Runner-up (Day 32)	
JaNa	Coye		Connor		Hakeem	Vulnerable	Kenny	Liv to save	Single	Kenny		Safe	Finalist	Third place (Day 32)	
Kenny	Not in Villa						JaNa	Nigel to save	Catherine	JaNa		Safe	Finalist	Third place (Day 32)	
Kendall	Hannah		Hannah	Nicole	Nicole	Vulnerable	Nicole	Rob to save	Nicole	Nicole		Safe	Finalist	Fourth place (Day 32)	
Nicole	Not in Villa			Kendall	Kendall	Vulnerable	Kendall	Liv to save	Kendall	Kendall		Safe	Finalist	Fourth place (Day 32)	
Aaron	Kaylor		Kaylor		Kaylor	Safe	Kaylor	Rob to save	Single	Kaylor		Vulnerable	Eliminated	Dumped (Day 30)	
Kaylor	Aaron		Aaron		Aaron	Safe	Aaron	Liv to save	Single	Aaron		Vulnerable	Eliminated	Dumped (Day 30)	
Kassy	Not in Villa											Rob to save	Eliminated	Dumped (Day 30)	
Rob	Leah	Liv	Leah	Andrea	Andrea	Vulnerable	Cassidy	Vulnerable	Daniela	Daniela		Vulnerable	Eliminated	Dumped (Day 30)	
Daniela	Not in Villa								Rob	Rob		Vulnerable	Dumped (Day 27)		
Harrison	Not in Villa										Sierra	Vulnerable	Dumped (Day 27)		
Sierra	Not in Villa								Miguel	Caine	Harrison	Vulnerable	Dumped (Day 27)		
Caine	Not in Villa								Liv	Sierra	Single	Dumped (Day 25)			
Catherine	Not in Villa								Kenny	Single	Dumped (Day 24)				
Daia	Not in Villa								Kordell	Single	Dumped (Day 24)				
Liv	Not in Villa	Rob	Hakeem		Miguel	Immune	Nigel	Vulnerable	Caine	Single	Dumped (Day 24)				
Destiny	Not in Villa								Single	Dumped (Day 20)					
George	Not in Villa								Single	Dumped (Day 20)					
Ignacio	Not in Villa								Single	Dumped (Day 20)					
Jacobi	Not in Villa								Single	Dumped (Day 20)					
Jalen	Not in Villa								Single	Dumped (Day 20)					
Josiah	Not in Villa								Single	Dumped (Day 20)					
Sydney	Not in Villa								Single	Dumped (Day 20)					
Cassidy	Not in Villa						Rob	Vulnerable	Dumped (Day 16)						
Nigel	Not in Villa						Liv	Vulnerable	Dumped (Day 16)						
Connor	Not in Villa		JaNa		Leah	Safe	Single	Dumped (Day 15)							
Andrea	Not in Villa			Rob	Rob	Vulnerable	Dumped (Day 11)								
Hakeem	Not in Villa		Liv		JaNa	Vulnerable	Dumped (Day 11)								
Hannah	Kendall		Kendall	Single		Dumped (Day 10)									
Coye	JaNa		Single	Dumped (Day 4)											
Notes	none	1	none	2	none	3	none	4	5	none	6	7	8	9	
Dumped	No; Dumping		Coye; Failed to couple up	No; Dumping	Hannah; Failed to couple up	Hakeem; Boys' choice to dump	Connor; Failed to couple up	Cassidy; 0 of 10 votes to save	Destiny, George, Ignacio, Jacobi, Jalen, Josiah, Sydney; Failed to couple up	Catherine, Daia, Liv; Failed to couple up	Caine; Failed to couple up	Daniela, Harrison, Sierra; Islanders’ choice to dump	Aaron & Kaylor, Kassy & Rob; America's choice to dump	Kendall & Nicole; Fewest votes to win	
Dumped	No; Dumping		Coye; Failed to couple up	No; Dumping	Hannah; Failed to couple up	Hakeem; Boys' choice to dump	Connor; Failed to couple up	Cassidy; 0 of 10 votes to save	Destiny, George, Ignacio, Jacobi, Jalen, Josiah, Sydney; Failed to couple up	Catherine, Daia, Liv; Failed to couple up	Caine; Failed to couple up	Daniela, Harrison, Sierra; Islanders’ choice to dump	Aaron & Kaylor, Kassy & Rob; America's choice to dump	JaNa & Kenny; Third–most votes to win	
Dumped	No; Dumping		Coye; Failed to couple up	No; Dumping	Hannah; Failed to couple up	Andrea; Girls’ choice to dump	Connor; Failed to couple up	Nigel; 1 of 10 votes to save	Destiny, George, Ignacio, Jacobi, Jalen, Josiah, Sydney; Failed to couple up	Catherine, Daia, Liv; Failed to couple up	Caine; Failed to couple up	Daniela, Harrison, Sierra; Islanders’ choice to dump	Aaron & Kaylor, Kassy & Rob; America's choice to dump	Leah & Miguel; Second–most votes to win	
Dumped	No; Dumping		Coye; Failed to couple up	No; Dumping	Hannah; Failed to couple up	Andrea; Girls’ choice to dump	Connor; Failed to couple up	Nigel; 1 of 10 votes to save	Destiny, George, Ignacio, Jacobi, Jalen, Josiah, Sydney; Failed to couple up	Catherine, Daia, Liv; Failed to couple up	Caine; Failed to couple up	Daniela, Harrison, Sierra; Islanders’ choice to dump	Aaron & Kaylor, Kassy & Rob; America's choice to dump	Kordell & Serena; Most votes to win	

=== Notes ===
- ^Note 1: Liv entered the villa after the initial coupling and was told that after twelve hours she would be allowed to steal a guy from another girl. Liv decided to steal Rob, leaving Leah single.
- ^Note 2: Andrea & Nicole had to recouple with one of the boys who offered to be their partner. Hakeem, Kendall, Kordell & Rob volunteered leaving them to be considered for the recoupling. Andrea & Nicole chose Rob & Kendall respectively, leaving Leah & Hannah single.
- ^Note 3: America voted for their favorite couples. For being the newest bombshell, Miguel earned immunity from the first public dumping. Liv was also granted immunity due to Miguel choosing her at the re-coupling ceremony. The four safe boys then had to decide which vulnerable boy to dump, choosing Hakeem, and the four safe girls had to decide which vulnerable girl to dump, choosing Andrea.
- ^Note 4: America voted for the couple they thought was most compatible. The five safe couples then had to stand behind the vulnerable islander they wanted to save. The two islanders who received the fewest votes would be dumped from the island. Cassidy & Nigel received the fewest votes, dumping them from the island.
- ^Note 5: As the final part for the Casa Amor twist in week 3, Casa Amor and the villa held two separate re-coupling ceremonies for the original islanders to choose whether to return to their previous partner or pick any new partner. Any of the 12 new islanders that remained single by the end of either ceremony was dumped from the villa. However, if one of the 12 original islanders remained single at the end of both ceremonies, they would still remain in the villa, but as a single islander. Destiny, George, Ignacio, Jacobi, Jalen, Josiah, and Sydney remained single at the end the night, and were all dumped from the villa.
- ^Note 6: Harrison entered the villa after the re-coupling and was told that after 24 hours he would be allowed to steal a girl from another guy. Harrison decided to steal Sierra, leaving Caine single and dumped from the villa.
- ^Note 7: America voted for their favorite couple. As a result, the three couples with the fewest votes were all vulnerable. The four safe couples had to vote for who was the most compatible. The safe couples chose Aaron & Kaylor as the most compatible couple. As a result, Daniela and Sierra were both dumped immediately, but being the newest bombshell, Kassy got to choose which of the remaining vulnerable boys she would like to couple up with. She ultimately chose to couple up with Rob, leaving Harrison dumped.
- ^Note 8: America voted for their favorite couple. The four couples who received the most votes were granted a spot in the final. The two vulnerable couples who received the fewest votes were dumped from the villa.
- ^Note 9: America voted for which couple they think should win Love Island. The couple with the most votes were declared the winners of Love Island and received the grand prize money.

== Episodes ==
No. overall	No. in season	Title	Day(s)	Original release date	Prod. code
Week 1
161	1	"Episode 1"	Days 1–2	June 11, 2024	601
162	2	"Episode 2"	Days 2–3	June 12, 2024	602
163	3	"Episode 3"	Days 3–4	June 13, 2024	603
164	4	"Episode 4"	Days 4–5	June 14, 2024	604
165	5	"Episode 5: Aftersun"	N/A (Note: This episode showcased events from the previous days in the week. No new or present days were featured.)	June 15, 2024	605
166	6	"Episode 6"	Days 5–6	June 16, 2024	606
167	7	"Episode 7"	Days 6–7	June 17, 2024	607
Week 2
168	8	"Episode 8"	Days 7–8	June 18, 2024	608
169	9	"Episode 9"	Days 8–9	June 20, 2024	609
170	10	"Episode 10"	Days 9–10	June 21, 2024	610
171	11	"Episode 11: Aftersun"	N/A	June 22, 2024	611
172	12	"Episode 12"	Days 10–11	June 23, 2024	612
173	13	"Episode 13"	Days 11–12	June 24, 2024	613
174	14	"Episode 14"	Days 12–13	June 25, 2024	614
175	15	"Episode 15"	Days 13–14	June 27, 2024	615
Week 3
176	16	"Episode 16"	Days 14–15	June 28, 2024	616
177	17	"Episode 17: Aftersun"	N/A	June 29, 2024	617
178	18	"Episode 18"	Days 15–16	June 30, 2024	618
179	19	"Episode 19"	Days 16–17	July 1, 2024	619
180	20	"Episode 20"	Days 17–18	July 2, 2024	620
181	21	"Episode 21"	Days 18–19	July 4, 2024	621
182	22	"Episode 22"	Days 19–20	July 5, 2024	622
183	23	"Episode 23: Aftersun"	N/A	July 6, 2024	623
184	24	"Episode 24"	Days 20–21	July 7, 2024	624
Week 4
185	25	"Episode 25"	Days 21–22	July 8, 2024	625
186	26	"Episode 26"	Days 22–23	July 9, 2024	626
187	27	"Episode 27"	Days 23–24	July 11, 2024	627
188	28	"Episode 28"	Days 24–25	July 12, 2024	628
189	29	"Episode 29: Aftersun"	N/A	July 13, 2024	629
190	30	"Episode 30"	Days 25–26	July 14, 2024	630
191	31	"Episode 31"	Days 26–27	July 15, 2024	631
192	32	"Episode 32"	Days 27–28	July 16, 2024	632
Week 5
193	33	"Episode 33"	Days 28–29	July 18, 2024	633
194	34	"Episode 34"	Days 29–30	July 19, 2024	634
195	35	"Episode 35: Aftersun"	N/A	July 20, 2024	635
196	36	"Episode 36"	Days 30–32	July 21, 2024	636
Special
197	37	"Episode 37: Reunion"	N/A	August 19, 2024	637
