= Love Island USA season 5 =

2023 season of Love Island USA

Love Island USA
- Season 5
- Promotional poster for the season
- Hosted by: Sarah Hyland
- No. of days: 32
- No. of contestants: 33
- Winners: Marco Donatelli; Hannah Wright
- Runners-up: Kassy Castillo; Leonardo Dionicio
- No. of episodes: 37

Release
- Original network: Peacock
- Original release: July 18 – August 27, 2023

Season chronology
- ← Previous; Season 4 Next → Season 6

The fifth season of the American version of the television reality program Love Island premiered on July 18, 2023.

== Format ==
Love Island is a reality television program in which a group of contestants, who are referred to as "Islanders", are living in a villa in Fiji. The Islanders are cut off from the outside world and are under constant video surveillance. To survive in the villa, the Islanders must be in a relationship with another Islander. The Islanders couple up for the first time on first impressions but they are later forced to "re-couple" at special ceremonies in which they can choose to remain with their current partners or to switch partners. At the villa, the couples must share a bed for sleeping and are permitted to talk with other Islanders at any time, allowing them to get to know everyone. While in the villa, each Islander has his or her own telephone, with which they can contact other Islanders via text and can receive text messages informing them of the latest challenges, dumpings, and re-couplings. While the Islanders might appear to have unmediated access to the outside world, they are limited in both their alcohol consumption and communication with the outside world.

The Islanders are presented with many games and challenges that are designed to test their physical and mental abilities, after which the winners are sometimes presented with special prizes, such as a night at the Hideaway or a special date.

Islanders can be eliminated, or "dumped", for several reasons; these include remaining single after a re-coupling and by public vote through the Love Island mobile app. During the show's final week, members of the public vote to decide which couple should win the series; the couple who receive the most votes win.

At the envelope ceremony on finale night, the couple who received the highest number of votes from the public receive two envelopes, one for each partner. One envelope contains $100,000 and the other contains nothing. The partner with the $100,000 envelope may choose whether to share the money with his or her partner as a test of trust and commitment.

== Islanders ==
The original islanders of the fifth season of Love Island USA. Left to right: Bergie, Jasmine, Keenan, Anna, Victor, Destiny, Marco, Kassy, Leo and Kay Kay

The original Islanders were revealed on July 11, 2023, one week before the series launch.

Matia Marcantuoni previously appeared as a contestant on the second season of Bachelor in Paradise Canada.

On Day 25, Scott van-der-Sluis entered the villa. He previously appeared as a contestant on the tenth series of Love Island in the United Kingdom just weeks before, and appeared on the first season of Love Island Games.

Islander	Age	Hometown	Entered	Exited	Status	Ref
Hannah Wright	24	Palm Springs, California	Day 2	Day 32	Winner	
Marco Donatelli	22	Girard, Ohio	Day 1	Day 32	Winner	
Kassandra "Kassy" Castillo	22	Fort Worth, Texas	Day 1	Day 32	Runner-up	
Leonardo Dionicio	21	West Hartford, Connecticut	Day 1	Day 32	Runner-up	
Carsten "Bergie" Bergersen	23	Cottage Grove, Minnesota	Day 1	Day 32	Third place	
Taylor Smith	24	Orange County, California	Day 17	Day 32	Third place	
Carmen Kocourek	22	Milwaukee, Wisconsin	Day 2	Day 32	Fourth place	
Kenzo Nudo	26	Phoenix, Arizona	Day 10	Day 32	Fourth place	
Johnnie Garcia	25	Whittier, California	Day 17	Day 30	Dumped	
Scott van-der-Sluis	22	Connah's Quay, Wales	Day 25	Day 30	Dumped	
Destiny Davis	27	Florissant, Missouri	Day 1	Day 30	Dumped	
Kyle Darden	24	Floral Park, New York	Day 16	Day 30	Dumped	
Imani Wheeler	22	Sacramento, California	Day 13	Day 28	Dumped	
Isiah "Zay" Harayda	23	Long Island, New York	Day 16	Day 28	Dumped	
Matia Marcantuoni	29	Toronto, Ontario, Canada	Day 16	Day 27	Dumped	
Jonah Allman	24	Rancho Murieta, California	Day 10	Day 24	Walked	
Vickala "Kay Kay" Gray	25	Palestine, Texas	Day 1	Day 24	Walked	
Mike Stark	22	Augusta, Georgia	Day 13	Day 24	Dumped	
Taylor Chmelka	23	San Diego, California	Day 17	Day 24	Dumped	
Keenan Anunay	23	Washington, D.C.	Day 1	Day 24	Dumped	
Hannah Ortega	22	Coral Springs, Florida	Day 18	Day 24	Dumped	
Allie Ryan	28	Madison, Wisconsin	Day 17	Day 21	Dumped	
Ashley Sims	23	Jefferson City, Missouri	Day 17	Day 21	Dumped	
Brandon Janse Van Vuuren	22	Johannesburg, Gauteng, South Africa	Day 16	Day 21	Dumped	
Dasja Johnson	27	Harrells, North Carolina	Day 17	Day 21	Dumped	
Eddie Brown	26	Lagos, Nigeria	Day 16	Day 21	Dumped	
Najah Fleary	25	Bladensburg, Maryland	Day 17	Day 21	Dumped	
Robert "Rob" Rausch	24	Florence, Alabama	Day 16	Day 21	Dumped	
Harrison Luna	26	Adelaide, South Australia, Australia	Day 4	Day 15	Dumped	
Emily Chavez	25	Houston, Texas	Day 10	Day 15	Dumped	
Anna Kurdys	22	Boca Raton, Florida	Day 1	Day 11	Walked	
Victor Gonzalez	28	Atlanta, Georgia	Day 1	Day 8	Dumped	
Jasmine Sklavanitis	24	Mount Morris, Illinois	Day 1	Day 5	Dumped	

=== Future appearances ===
In 2023, Scott van-der-Sluis and Imani Wheeler appeared on season one of Love Island Games.

In 2024, Carsten "Bergie" Bergersen competed on the second season of the Peacock reality TV series The Traitors. Rob Rausch returned as an original Islander, while Harrison Luna and Kassy Castillo returned as bombshells for the sixth season of Love Island USA.

In 2025, Van-der-Sluis appeared on season three of Perfect Match. Luna made a guest appearance on Love Island: Beyond the Villa. Kay Kay Gray competed on season two of Love Island Games.

In 2026, Rausch competed on the fourth season of The Traitors. Additionally, van-der-Sluis and Wheeler returned for the third series of Love Island: All Stars. Kenzo Nudo competed on the sixth season of La casa de los famosos. Castillo appeared on season four of Perfect Match. Leonardo Dionicio competed on season 42 of The Challenge.

== Production ==
=== Development ===
On February 23, 2022, it was announced that the series would no longer air on CBS, who aired the first three seasons. The series was picked up for two additional seasons, including the fifth season by Peacock, with Sarah Hyland as host. Iain Stirling as narrator and Maura Higgins as social media ambassador, bringing all the behind the scenes gossip and interviews.

The season was filmed in Fiji.

== Coupling and elimination history ==
	Week 1			Week 2		Week 3		Week 4			Week 5		
	Day 1	Day 3	Day 5	Day 8	Day 11	Day 15	Day 21	Day 24	Day 27	Day 28	Day 30	Final	
Marco	Destiny	Hannah W.	Hannah W.	Victor to save	Hannah W.	Safe	Hannah W.	Safe	Hannah W.	Destiny & Kyle to dump	Finalist	Split the 100k	Winner (Day 32)
Hannah W.	Not in Villa	Marco	Marco	Carmen to save	Marco	Safe	Marco	Safe	Marco	Destiny & Kyle to dump	Finalist	Winner (Day 32)	
Kassy	Leonardo		Bergie	Carmen to save	Leonardo	Vulnerable	Matia	Safe	Leonardo	Imani & Zay to dump	Finalist	Runner-up (Day 32)	
Leonardo	Kassy		Anna	Victor to save	Kassy	Vulnerable	Johnnie	Vulnerable	Kassy	Imani & Zay to dump	Finalist	Runner-up (Day 32)	
Bergie	Anna	Single	Kassy	Carmen to save	Single	Safe	Taylor S.	Safe	Taylor S.	Johnnie & Scott to dump	Finalist	Third place (Day 32)	
Taylor S.	Not in Villa						Bergie	Vulnerable	Bergie	Johnnie & Scott to dump	Finalist	Third place (Day 32)	
Carmen	Not in Villa	Victor	Victor	Vulnerable	Kenzo	Vulnerable	Kenzo	Safe	Kenzo	Imani & Zay to dump	Finalist	Fourth place (Day 32)	
Kenzo	Not in Villa				Carmen	Vulnerable	Carmen	Safe	Carmen	Imani & Zay to dump	Finalist	Fourth place (Day 32)	
Johnnie	Not in Villa						Leonardo	Vulnerable	Scott	Imani & Zay to dump	Eliminated	Dumped (Day 30)	
Scott	Not in Villa								Johnnie	Imani & Zay to dump	Eliminated	Dumped (Day 30)	
Destiny	Marco	Single	Harrison	Carmen to save	Jonah	Vulnerable	Zay	Safe	Kyle	Imani & Zay to dump	Eliminated	Dumped (Day 30)	
Kyle	Not in Villa						Imani	Safe	Destiny	Imani & Zay to dump	Eliminated	Dumped (Day 30)	
Imani	Not in Villa					Immune	Kyle	Safe	Zay	Destiny & Kyle to dump	Dumped (Day 28)		
Zay	Not in Villa						Destiny	Vulnerable	Imani	Destiny & Kyle to dump	Dumped (Day 28)		
Matia	Not in Villa						Kassy	Safe	Single	Dumped (Day 27)			
Jonah	Not in Villa				Destiny	Safe	Taylor C.	Safe	Walked (Day 24)				
Kay Kay	Keenan		Keenan	Carmen to save	Keenan	Safe	Single	Safe	Walked (Day 24)				
Hannah O.	Not in Villa						Mike	Eliminated	Dumped (Day 24)				
Keenan	Kay Kay		Kay Kay	Victor to save	Kay Kay	Vulnerable	Single	Eliminated	Dumped (Day 24)				
Mike	Not in Villa					Immune	Hannah O.	Eliminated	Dumped (Day 24)				
Taylor C.	Not in Villa						Jonah	Eliminated	Dumped (Day 24)				
Allie	Not in Villa						Single	Dumped (Day 21)					
Ashley	Not in Villa						Single	Dumped (Day 21)					
Brandon	Not in Villa						Single	Dumped (Day 21)					
Dasja	Not in Villa						Single	Dumped (Day 21)					
Eddie	Not in Villa						Single	Dumped (Day 21)					
Najah	Not in Villa						Single	Dumped (Day 21)					
Rob	Not in Villa						Single	Dumped (Day 21)					
Emily	Not in Villa				Harrison	Vulnerable	Dumped (Day 15)						
Harrison	Not in Villa		Destiny	Victor to save	Emily	Vulnerable	Dumped (Day 15)						
Anna	Bergie	Single	Leonardo	Carmen to save	Walked (Day 11)								
Victor	Jasmine	Carmen	Carmen	Vulnerable	Dumped (Day 8)								
Jasmine	Victor	Single		Dumped (Day 5)									
Notes	1	2	none	3	4	5	6	7	none		8	9	
Walked	none				Anna	none		Jonah, Kay Kay	none				
Dumped	No; Dumping		Jasmine; Failed to couple up	Victor; 4 of 10 votes to save	No; Dumping	Emily; Boys’ choice to dump	Allie, Ashley, Brandon, Dasja, Eddie, Najah, Rob; Failed to couple up	Hannah O., Taylor C. America's choice to dump	Matia; Failed to couple up	Imani & Zay; 4 of 7 votes to dump	Destiny & Kyle, Johnnie & Scott; America's choice to dump	Carmen & Kenzo; Fewest votes to win	
Dumped	No; Dumping		Jasmine; Failed to couple up	Victor; 4 of 10 votes to save	No; Dumping	Emily; Boys’ choice to dump	Allie, Ashley, Brandon, Dasja, Eddie, Najah, Rob; Failed to couple up	Hannah O., Taylor C. America's choice to dump	Matia; Failed to couple up	Imani & Zay; 4 of 7 votes to dump	Destiny & Kyle, Johnnie & Scott; America's choice to dump	Bergie & Taylor S. Third–most votes to win	
Dumped	No; Dumping		Jasmine; Failed to couple up	Victor; 4 of 10 votes to save	No; Dumping	Harrison; Girls’ choice to dump	Allie, Ashley, Brandon, Dasja, Eddie, Najah, Rob; Failed to couple up	Keenan, Mike; America's choice to dump	Matia; Failed to couple up	Imani & Zay; 4 of 7 votes to dump	Destiny & Kyle, Johnnie & Scott; America's choice to dump	Kassy & Leonardo; Second–most votes to win	
Dumped	No; Dumping		Jasmine; Failed to couple up	Victor; 4 of 10 votes to save	No; Dumping	Harrison; Girls’ choice to dump	Allie, Ashley, Brandon, Dasja, Eddie, Najah, Rob; Failed to couple up	Keenan, Mike; America's choice to dump	Matia; Failed to couple up	Imani & Zay; 4 of 7 votes to dump	Destiny & Kyle, Johnnie & Scott; America's choice to dump	Hannah W. & Marco; Most votes to win	

=== Notes ===
- ^Note 1: On Night 1, the islanders were told to vote for the least compatible couple. Anna & Bergie received 4 out of 5 votes. Afterwards, Anna & Bergie had to choose one of the two of them to dump from the villa. Bergie chose to dump himself from the villa, but returned the next day with new Islanders Carmen and Hannah.
- ^Note 2: Carmen and Hannah entered the villa after the initial coupling and were told that after twenty-four hours they'd be allowed to steal a guy from another girl.
- ^Note 3: For winning the "Mr. and Mrs." game, Hannah & Marco won immunity that kept them safe from being voted in the first public dumping. In addition, they also won the power to save another couple from the first public dumping. They chose Anna & Leonardo. America then voted for their favorite couples. Carmen & Victor received the fewest votes and were left vulnerable, as it was up to the other islanders to choose who would be dumped from the villa. The islanders chose to dump Victor.
- ^Note 4: On Day 11, it was revealed that the islanders would recouple, with the new bombshells (Emily, Jonah, & Kenzo) getting first pick. At the end of the recoupling, Bergie was left single as Anna decided to voluntarily leave the villa.
- ^Note 5: America voted for their favorite islanders. The top three boys and the top two girls who received the most votes were granted safety. As new islanders, Imani and Mike were immune from the vote. The three safe boys then had to decide which vulnerable girl to dump, choosing Emily, and the two safe girls had to decide which vulnerable boy to dump, choosing Harrison.
- ^Note 6: As the final part for the Casa Amor twist in week 3, Casa Amor and the villa held two separate re-coupling ceremonies for the original islanders to choose whether to return to their previous partner or pick any new partner. Any of the 14 new islanders that remained single by the end of either ceremony was dumped from the villa. However, if one of the 13 original islanders remained single at the end of both ceremonies, they would still remain in the villa, but as a single islander. Allie, Ashley, Brandon, Dasja, Eddie, Najah, and Rob remained single at the end the night, and were all dumped from the villa.
- ^Note 7: America voted for their favorite islanders. The top six boys and the top six girls who received the most votes were granted safety. The two vulnerable boys and two vulnerable girls who received the fewest votes were dumped from the villa.
- ^Note 8: America voted for their favorite couple. The top four couples who received the most votes were granted a spot in the final. The two vulnerable couples who received the fewest votes were dumped from the villa.
- ^Note 9: America voted for which couple they think should win Love Island. The couple with the most votes were declared the winners of Love Island and received the grand prize money.

== Episodes ==
No. overall	No. in season	Title	Day(s)	Original release date	Prod. code
Week 1
124	1	"Episode 1"	Day 1	July 18, 2023	501
125	2	"Episode 2"	Days 1–2	July 19, 2023	502
126	3	"Episode 3"	Days 2–3	July 20, 2023	503
127	4	"Episode 4"	Days 3–4	July 21, 2023	504
128	5	"Episode 5: Unseen Bits"	N/A (Note: This episode showcased events from the previous days in the week. No new or present days were featured.)	July 22, 2023	505
129	6	"Episode 6"	Days 4–5	July 23, 2023	506
130	7	"Episode 7"	Days 5–6	July 24, 2023	507
131	8	"Episode 8"	Days 6–7	July 25, 2023	508
Week 2
132	9	"Episode 9"	Days 7–8	July 27, 2023	509
133	10	"Episode 10"	Days 8–9	July 28, 2023	510
134	11	"Episode 11: Unseen Bits"	N/A	July 29, 2023	511
135	12	"Episode 12"	Days 9–10	July 30, 2023	512
136	13	"Episode 13"	Days 10–11	July 31, 2023	513
137	14	"Episode 14"	Days 11–12	August 1, 2023	514
138	15	"Episode 15"	Days 12–13	August 3, 2023	515
139	16	"Episode 16"	Days 13–14	August 4, 2023	516
140	17	"Episode 17: Unseen Bits"	N/A	August 5, 2023	517
Week 3
141	18	"Episode 18"	Days 14–15	August 6, 2023	518
142	19	"Episode 19"	Days 15–16	August 7, 2023	519
143	20	"Episode 20"	Days 16–17	August 8, 2023	520
144	21	"Episode 21"	Days 17–18	August 9, 2023	521
145	22	"Episode 22"	Days 18–19	August 10, 2023	522
146	23	"Episode 23"	Days 19–20	August 11, 2023	523
147	24	"Episode 24: Unseen Bits"	N/A	August 12, 2023	524
148	25	"Episode 25"	Days 20–21	August 13, 2023	525
Week 4
149	26	"Episode 26"	Days 21–22	August 14, 2023	526
150	27	"Episode 27"	Days 22–23	August 15, 2023	527
151	28	"Episode 28"	Days 23–24	August 17, 2023	528
152	29	"Episode 29"	Days 24–25	August 18, 2023	529
153	30	"Episode 30: Unseen Bits"	N/A	August 19, 2023	530
154	31	"Episode 31"	Days 25–26	August 20, 2023	531
155	32	"Episode 32"	Days 26–27	August 21, 2023	532
156	33	"Episode 33"	Days 27–28	August 22, 2023	533
Week 5
157	34	"Episode 34"	Days 28–29	August 24, 2023	534
158	35	"Episode 35"	Days 29–30	August 25, 2023	535
159	36	"Episode 36: Unseen Bits"	N/A	August 26, 2023	536
160	37	"Episode 37"	Days 30–32	August 27, 2023	537
