= Rob Rausch =

American snake wrangler and television personality (born 1998)

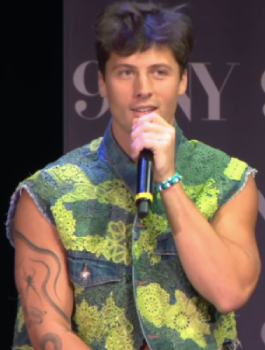
- Rausch in 2024
- Born: Robert Kelley Wilson Rausch; September 1, 1998 (age 28); Florence, Alabama, U.S.
- Education: University of North Alabama
- Occupation: Television personality
- Years active: 2023–present
- Known for: Love Island USA; The Traitors; Get Me Out of Here!

TikTok information
- Page: robert_kelley
- Followers: 2.3 M
- Last updated: March 5, 2026

Robert Kelley Wilson Rausch (born September 1, 1998) is an American snake wrangler and reality television personality. He gained prominence as a contestant on the fifth and sixth seasons of the reality dating show Love Island USA and later on the fourth season of the reality competition series The Traitors in 2026; both series aired on the streaming service Peacock. He's also set to co–host the upcoming reality competition series Get Me Out of Here!, scheduled to premiere in 2027.

== Early life and career ==
Robert Kelley Wilson Rausch was born in Florence, Alabama on September 1, 1998, to Robert and Jennifer Rausch. His father is a photographer and luxury designer. Rausch has two sisters and one brother. Raised on a 200–acre farm, Rausch has characterized his family's upbringing as "unorthodox," noting that he spent his childhood living in a three-bedroom trailer while also being homeschooled.

He graduated from Shoals Christian School in 2016 and later attended the University of North Alabama from 2017 to 2020, where he was a member of the Sigma Chi fraternity. An avid wildlife expert and snake wrangler, Rausch shares his experiences with reptiles and their habitats on social media, particularly TikTok, where he has garnered over two million followers. After his appearance on The Traitors, Rausch was signed to United Talent Agency. In 2026, Peacock announced Rausch as the new co-host of the I'm a Celebrity...Get Me Out of Here! reboot, retitled Get Me Out of Here!, alongside Maura Higgins.

Rausch is also the co-founder of Creek Rat, an independent clothing line he launched with his sister, Lily.

=== Love Island USA ===
In August 2023, he entered the Love Island USA villa as part of the series' Casa Amor twist on Day 16. He was one of six contestants competing for a spot in the main villa but was not selected and was subsequently eliminated on Day 21.

Rausch returned to the series in June 2024 for season 6 as part of the original lineup of contestants. He initially coupled up with Leah Kateb on Day 1, and their pairing quickly became popular among viewers. However, he ended his relationship with Kateb after bombshell Andrea Carmona entered the villa, which led to backlash from audiences and fans. Some media outlets labeled Rausch as a "villain" for this decision. After Carmona was eliminated from the villa, Rausch explored other connections, coupling up with Cassidy Laudano, Liv Walker, Daniela Ortiz-Rivera, and Kassy Castillo. After failing to find a meaningful connection, he was eliminated from the villa on Day 30 after receiving the fewest votes from the public. Although he formed a close connection with Carmona, Rausch decided not to pursue their relationship outside the villa.

=== The Traitors ===
In June 2025, Rausch was announced as a contestant on the fourth season of the reality competition series The Traitors. The season premiered in January 2026, and he was selected as a "Traitor" alongside Candiace Dillard Bassett and Lisa Rinna.

After banishing recruited Traitor Eric Nam at the Fire of Truth, he and Love Island co-star Maura Higgins, a "Faithful", decided to end the game, at which point Rausch revealed himself to be a Traitor, thereby winning the season. After the show, Rausch gifted Higgins a Birkin bag and presented it to her on Watch What Happens Live with Andy Cohen.

== Public image ==
=== Perception and reality television ===
Rausch's public image has undergone a significant shift across his career as a television personality. During his time on Love Island, media outlets characterized him as a polarizing figure, with Vice referring to him as having a "villain arc." He earned this reputation through his romantic pursuits and an episode that featured him jumping into a swimming pool to avoid confrontation—a moment that went viral online. In an interview with Alex Cooper, Rausch acknowledged that the public viewed him as a "toxic gaslighter" for this incident.

Following his victory on The Traitors in 2026, Rausch's image shifted positively, with Vulture labeling him a "strategic mastermind." Media analysis, including a feature with Interview Magazine, highlighted the effectiveness of his gameplay and noted the transformation from "heartthrob villain" to a legitimate competitor. Kelsey McKinney of Defector referred to Rausch as "the greatest Traitor of all time" for his ability to convince himself that he was a "Faithful" while avoiding detection. McKinney compared this strategy to that of Harry Clark, the winner of the second series of the show's British counterpart.

=== Personal style ===
Rausch is known for wearing denim overalls over his clothes and sometimes without a shirt. His look also includes his snake-themed tattoos on his arms, which Rausch has stated is reflective of his lifelong passion for wildlife. Since 2026, Rausch has appeared in high-fashion editorials and publications, such as GQ and The Cut. In March 2026, he was photographed wearing an "ICE Out" pin on a hoodie from his personal clothing brand. Rausch confirmed to GQ that the pin was a statement of support for immigrant communities, part of a broader movement against the Trump administration's mass deportation policies across the United States.

== Personal life ==
Rausch currently resides in his hometown of Florence, Alabama. His sister, Bella, who has Down syndrome, has been a major influence on his life and has spoken publicly about their close relationship. He's also close to his younger brother, Adam, who is gay and came out to him first. Rausch is also a multi-instrumentalist who plays the piano and guitar, and his hobbies include woodworking, motorcycle riding, and chess.

He is in a relationship as of February 2026.

== Filmography ==
=== Film ===
Film roles
Year	Title	Role	Notes
2025	Maintenance Required	Rob	Cameo

=== Television ===
As himself
Year	Title	Role	Notes	Ref.
2023	Love Island USA	Contestant	Season 5; Casa Amor, Dumped	
2024	Love Island USA	Contestant	Season 6; Dumped	
2026	The Traitors	Contestant	Season 4; Winner (11 episodes)	
2026	The Tonight Show Starring Jimmy Fallon	Himself	Guest; 1 episode	
2026	Watch What Happens Live with Andy Cohen	Himself	Guest; 1 episode	
2026	The Kelly Clarkson Show	Himself	Guest; 1 episode	
2027	Get Me Out of Here!	Host	Upcoming series	

=== Music videos ===
Year	Title	Artist(s)	Ref.
2022	"Let Me"	Ellie Laufer	
2024	"Passenger Princess"	Nessa Barrett	
2025	"Like It Like That"	Dasha	
2026	"How the Fire Started"	Eric Nam	

=== Audio ===
Year	Title	Role	Notes
2026	The Snake Handler	Alex	Main role

== Awards and nominations ==
Year	Award	Category	Work	Result	Refs.
2026	Critics' Choice Real TV Awards	Male Star of the Year	The Traitors	Won	
