= Aaron Evans (TV personality) =

English television personality (born 1997)

- Born: 5 June 1997 (age 29); Marbella, Spain
- Education: University of Portsmouth
- Occupation: Television personality
- Years active: 2022–present
- Known for: The Traitors; Love Island USA

Aaron Evans (born 5 June 1997) is an English television personality. He came to prominence for his appearances on the BBC One game show The Traitors (2022). He went on to appear on various reality television shows, including First Dates (2024), Celebrity Mastermind (2024), and Love Island USA (2024).

== Filmography ==
As himself
Year	Title	Notes	Ref.
2022	The Traitors	Joint winner; series 1	
2022	This Morning	Guest; 1 episode	
2024	First Dates	Himself; series 10	
2024	Celebrity Mastermind	Contestant; series 22	
2024	Love Island USA	Contestant; season 6	
2025	Love Island: Beyond the Villa	Himself; season 1	
