= The Traitors (American TV series) season 4 =

The Traitors
- Season 4
- Promotional poster
- Presented by: Alan Cumming
- No. of contestants: 23
- Winner: Rob Rausch
- Runner-up: Maura Higgins
- Location: Ardross Castle, Scottish Highlands
- No. of episodes: 12

Release
- Original network: Peacock
- Original release: January 8 – February 26, 2026

Season chronology
- ← Previous; Season 3 Next → Season 5

The fourth season of the American television series The Traitors was announced on August 14, 2024. The season premiered on January 8, 2026. The season concluded on February 26, 2026, where Rob Rausch won as a Traitor, while Maura Higgins placed as the runner-up, as a Faithful.

== Format ==
The show retained the same format and challenges as the The Traitors UK. The arrived contestants at the castle are referred to as the "Faithful," and among them are the "Traitors," a group of contestants secretly selected by the host, Alan Cumming. Each night, the Traitors would decide who to "murder," and that same contestant would leave the game. After the end of each day, where the contestants participated in various challenges to add money to the prize fund, they would participate in the Round Table, where they must decide who to banish from the game, trying to identify the Traitor.

If all the remaining players are Faithful, then the prize money is divided evenly among them. However, if any Traitors remain, they win the entire pot.

== Contestants ==
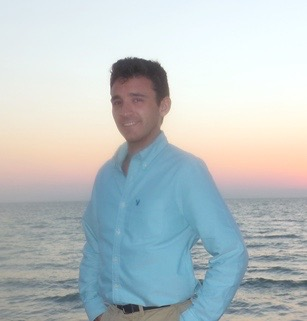
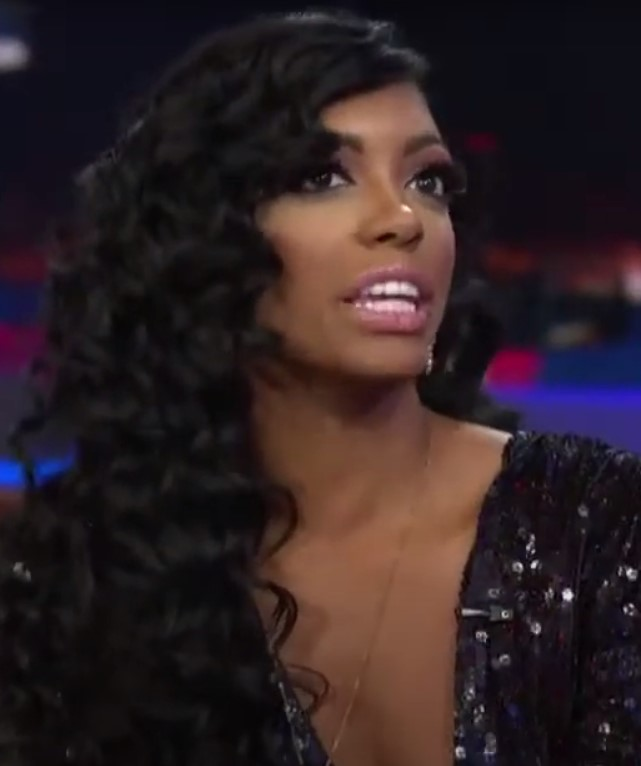
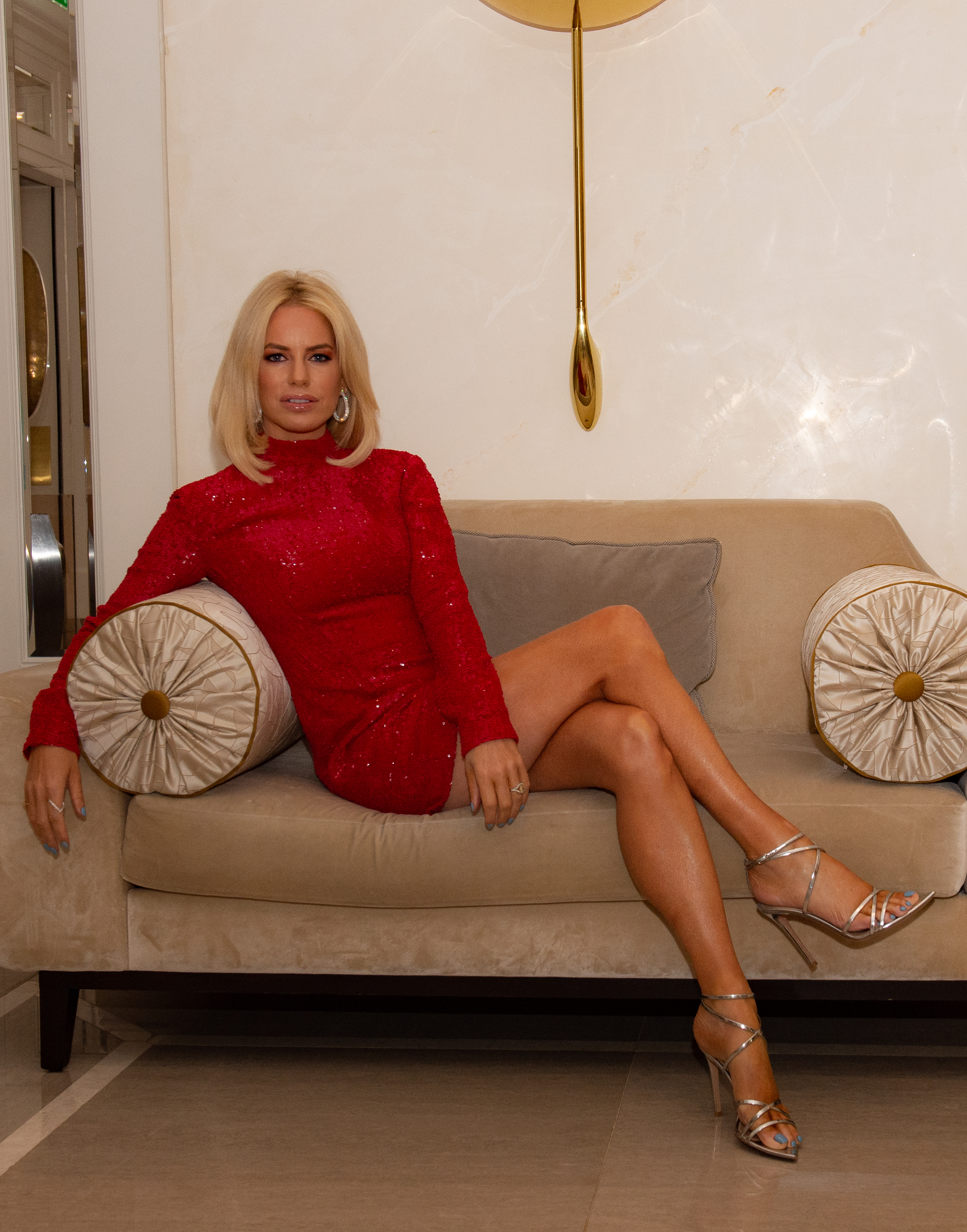
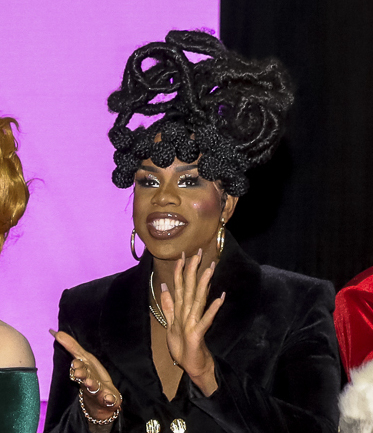
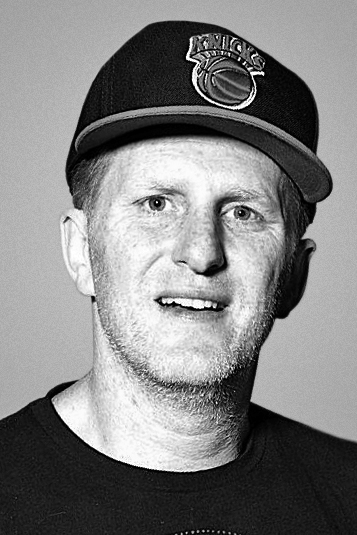
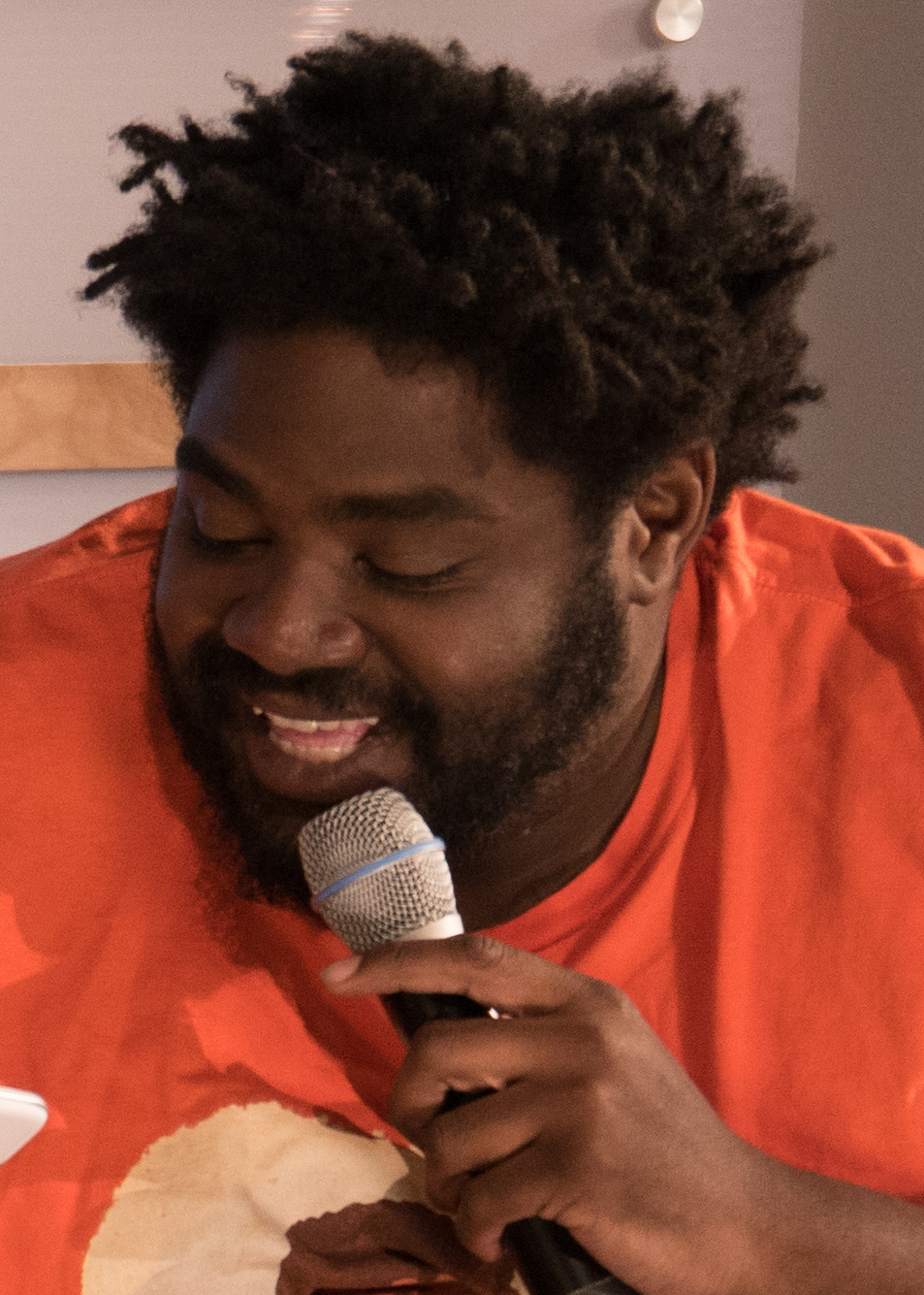
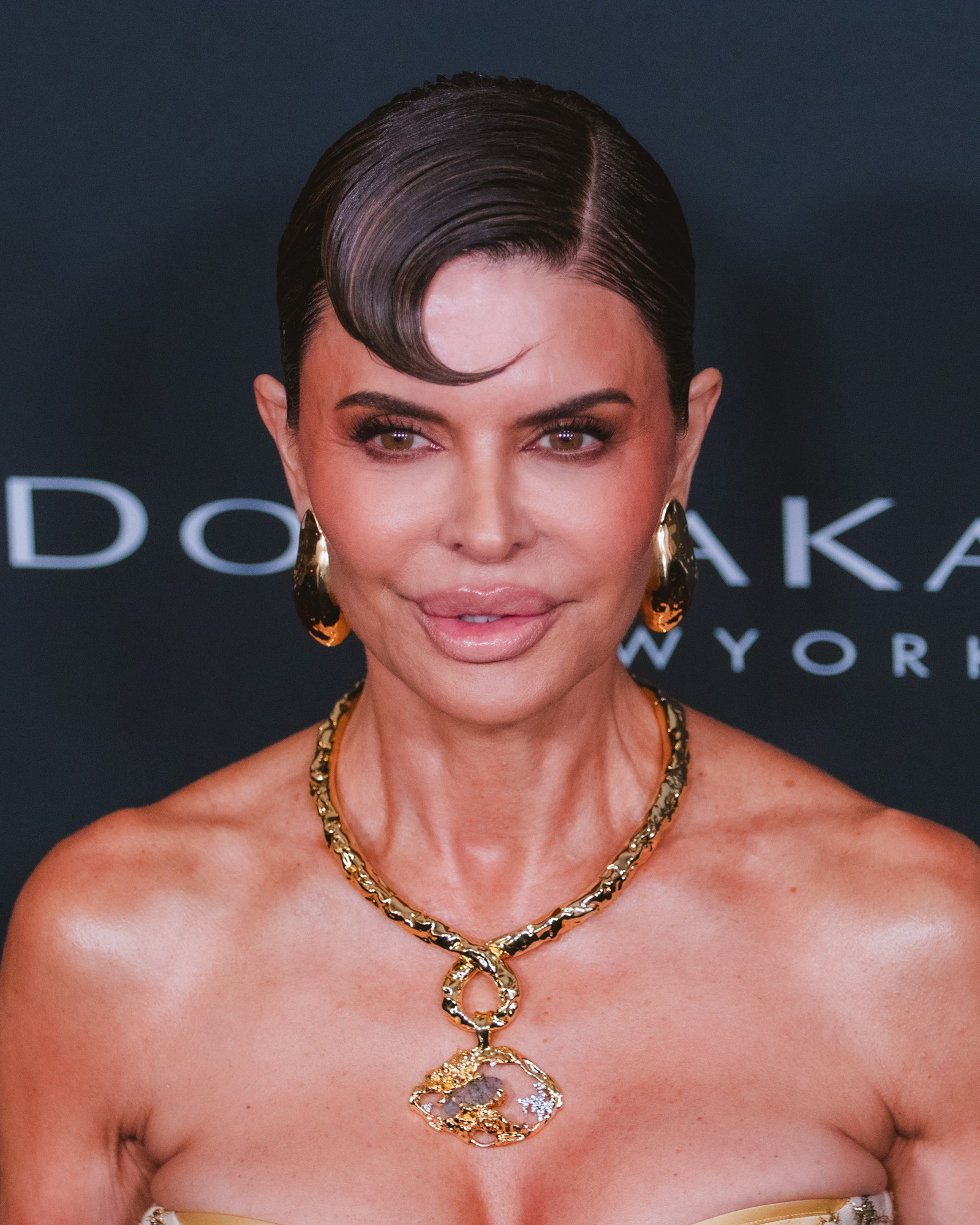
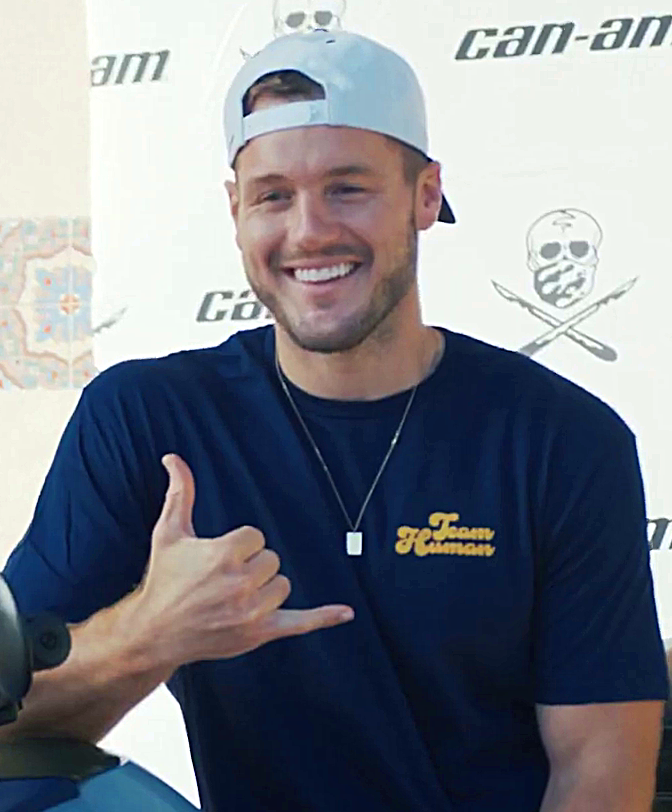
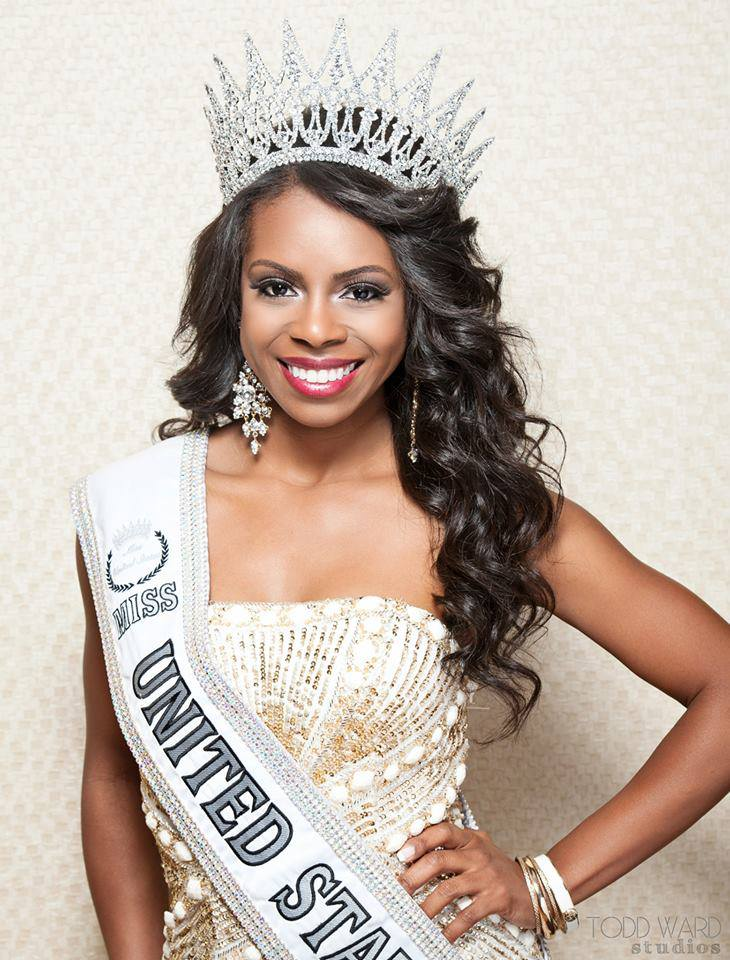
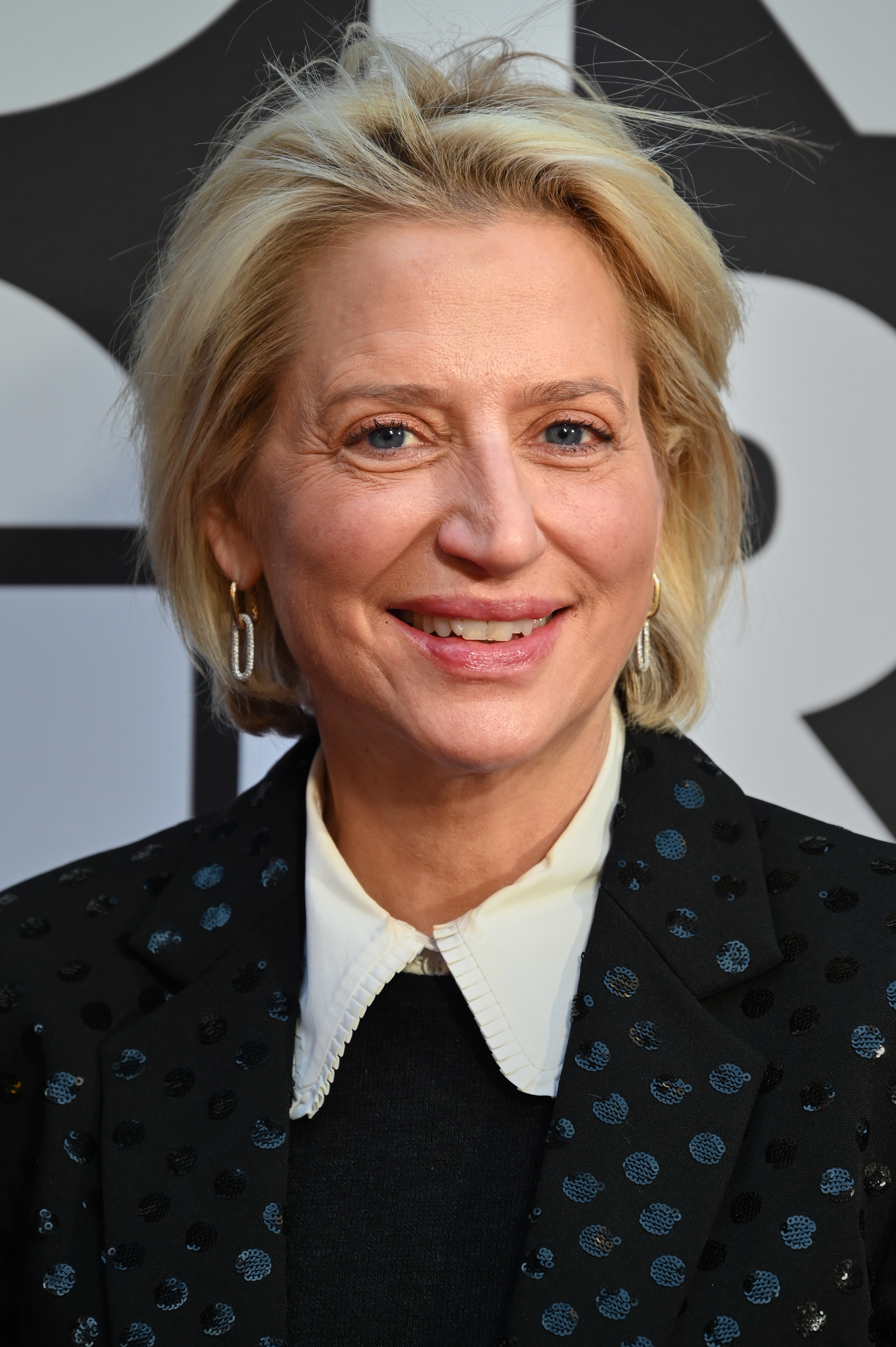
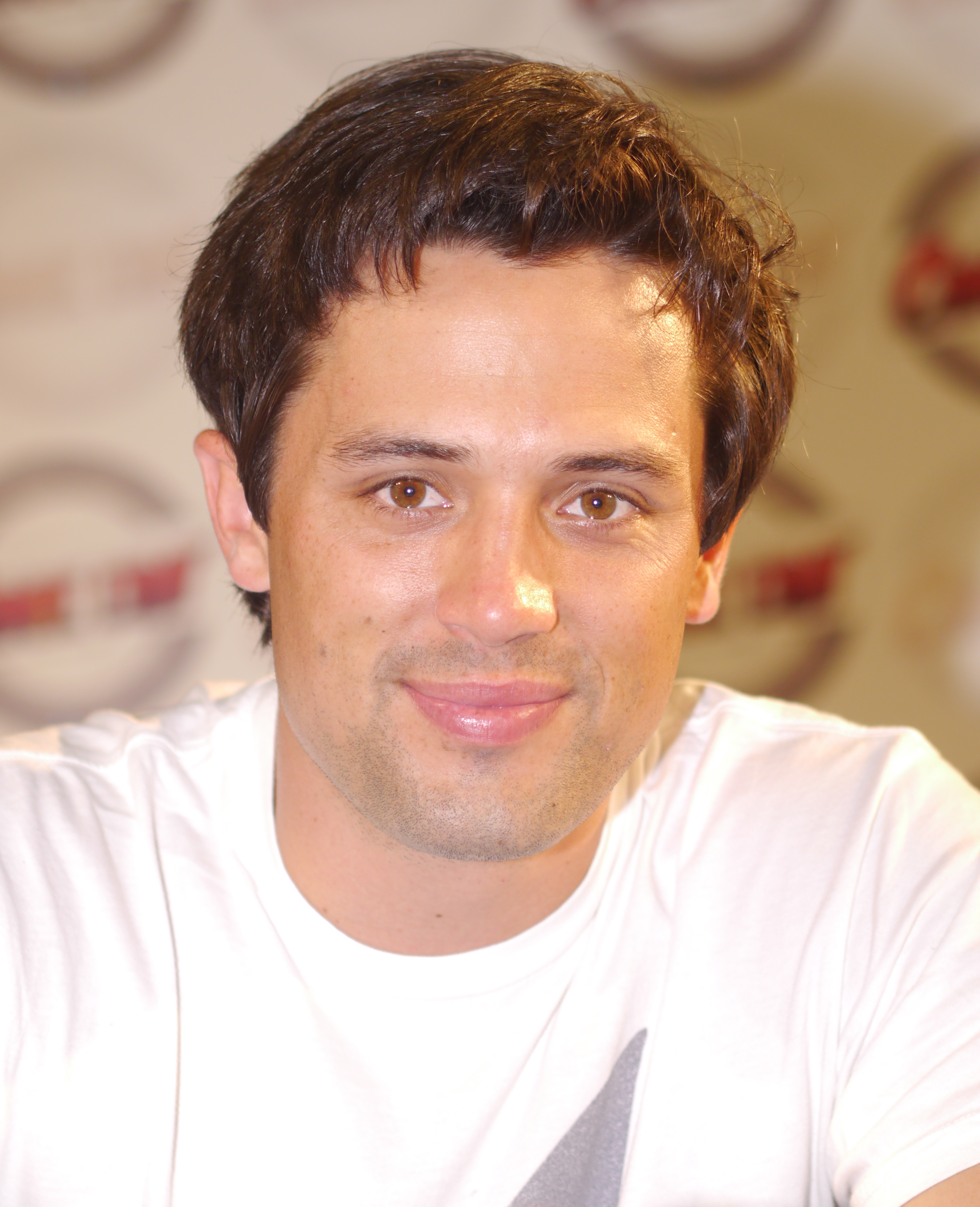
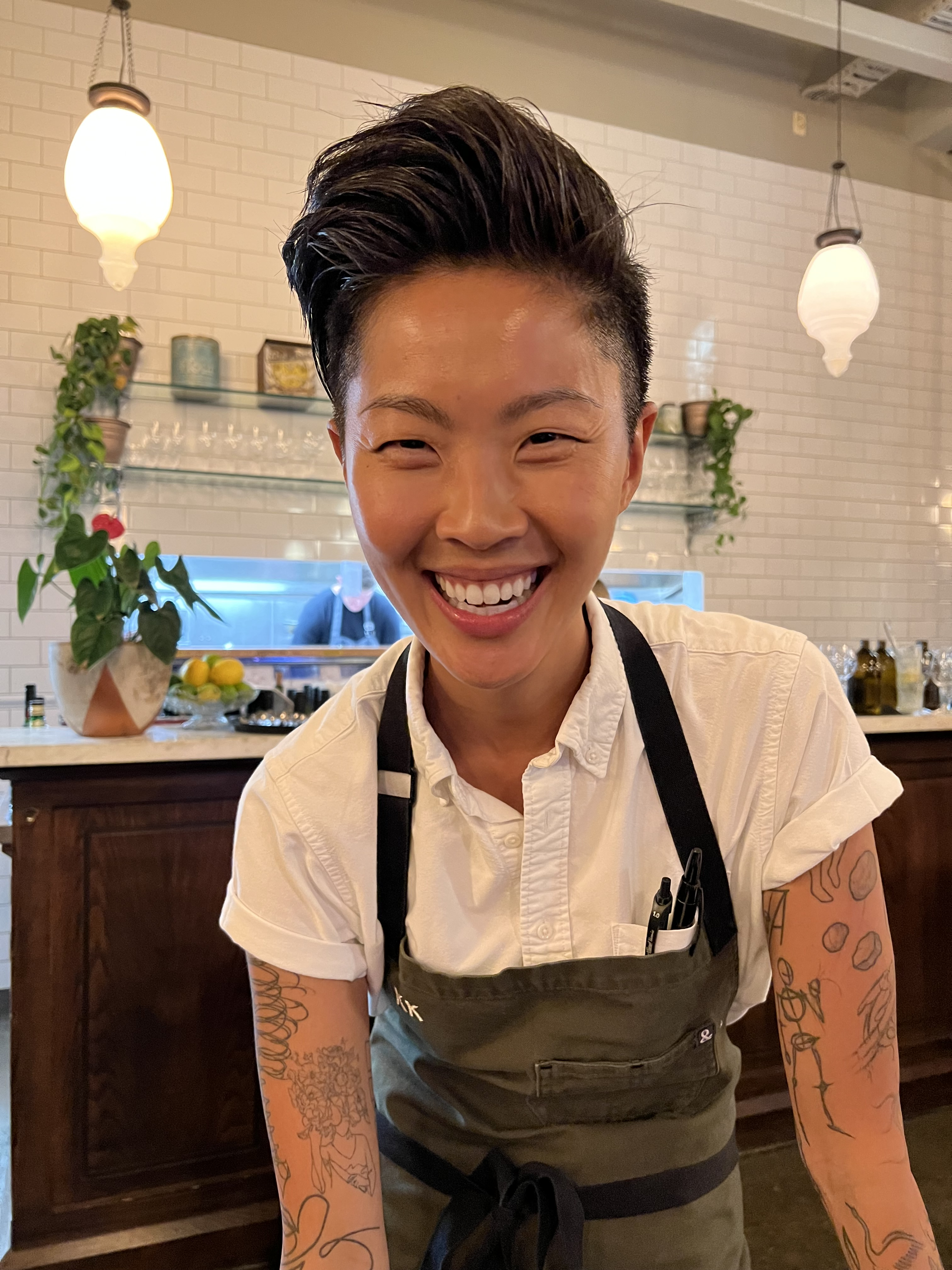
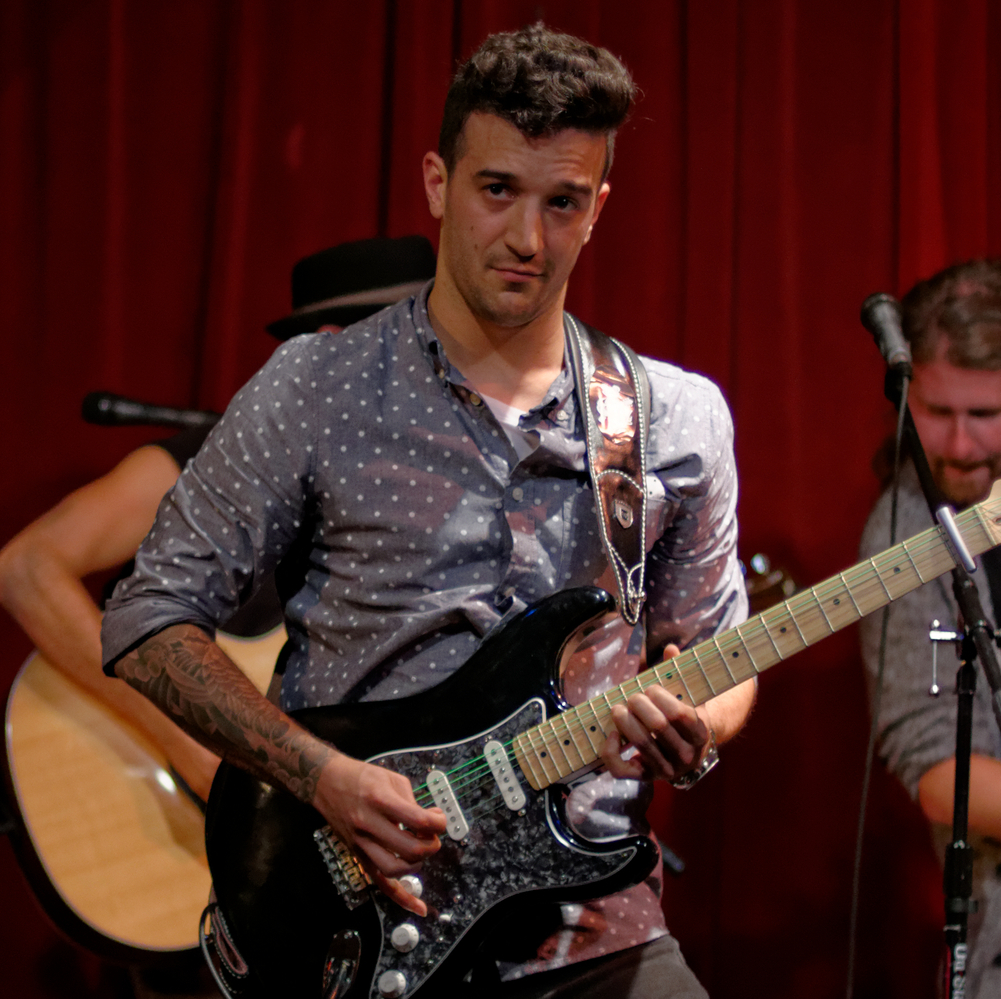
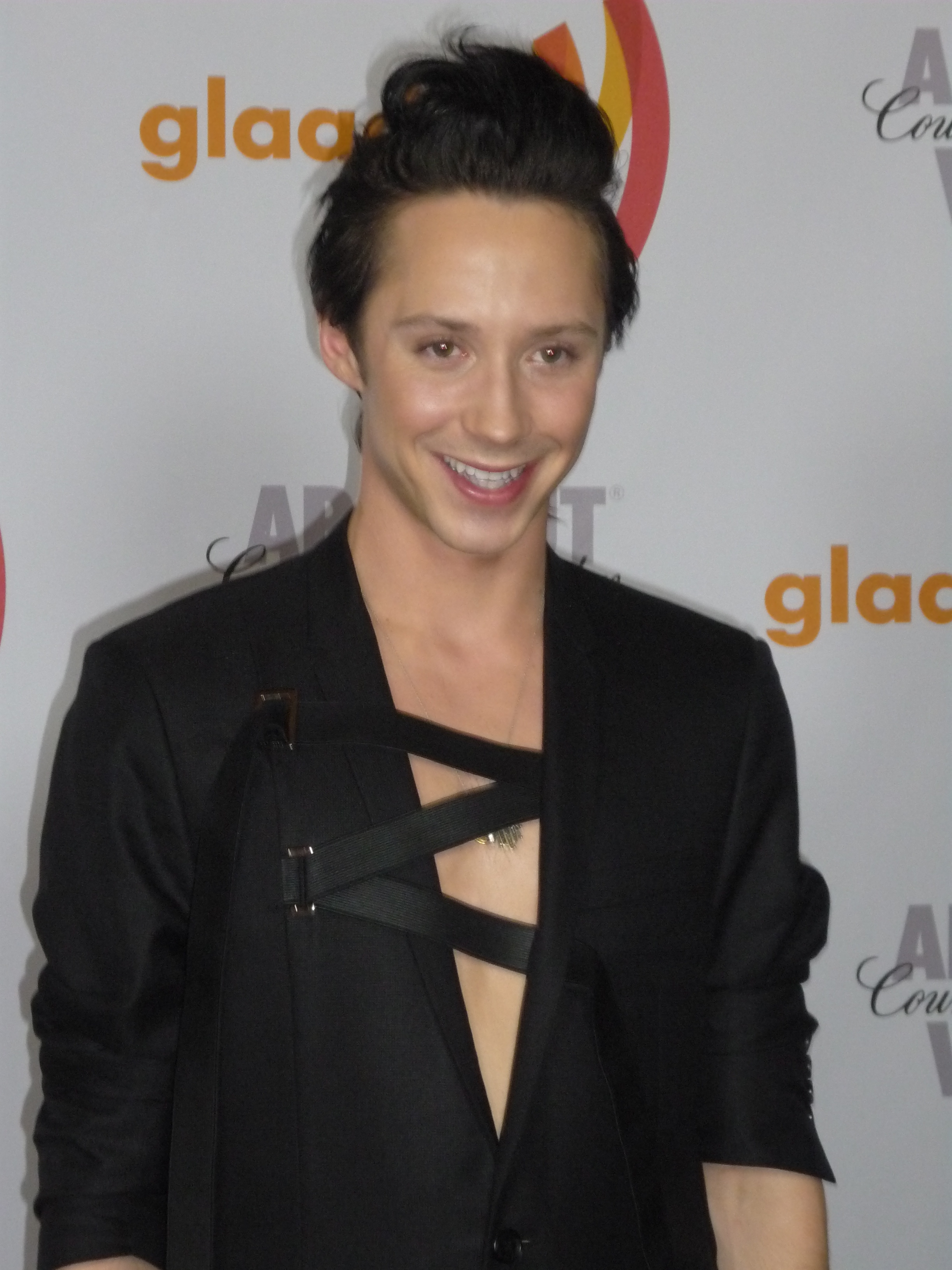
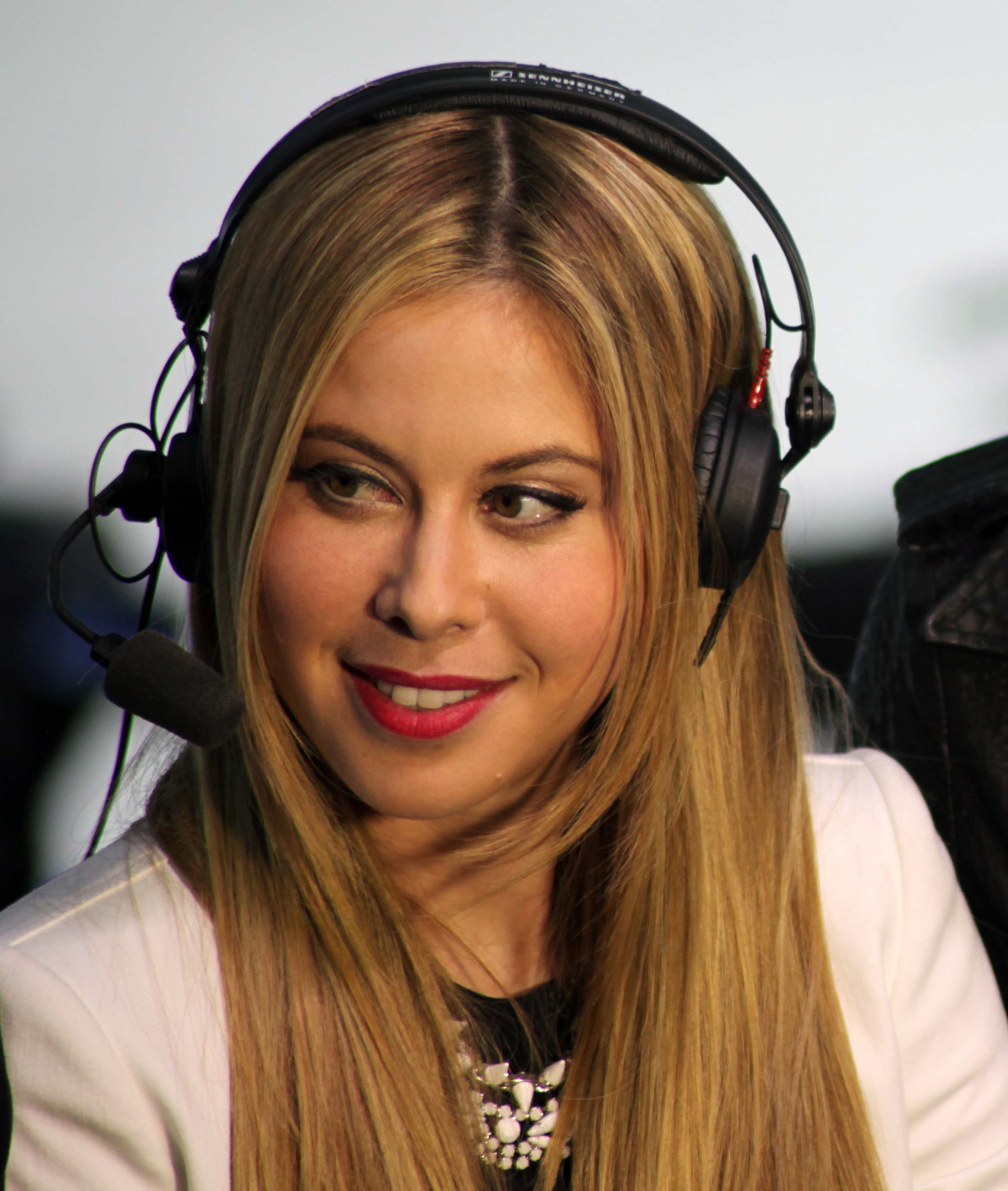
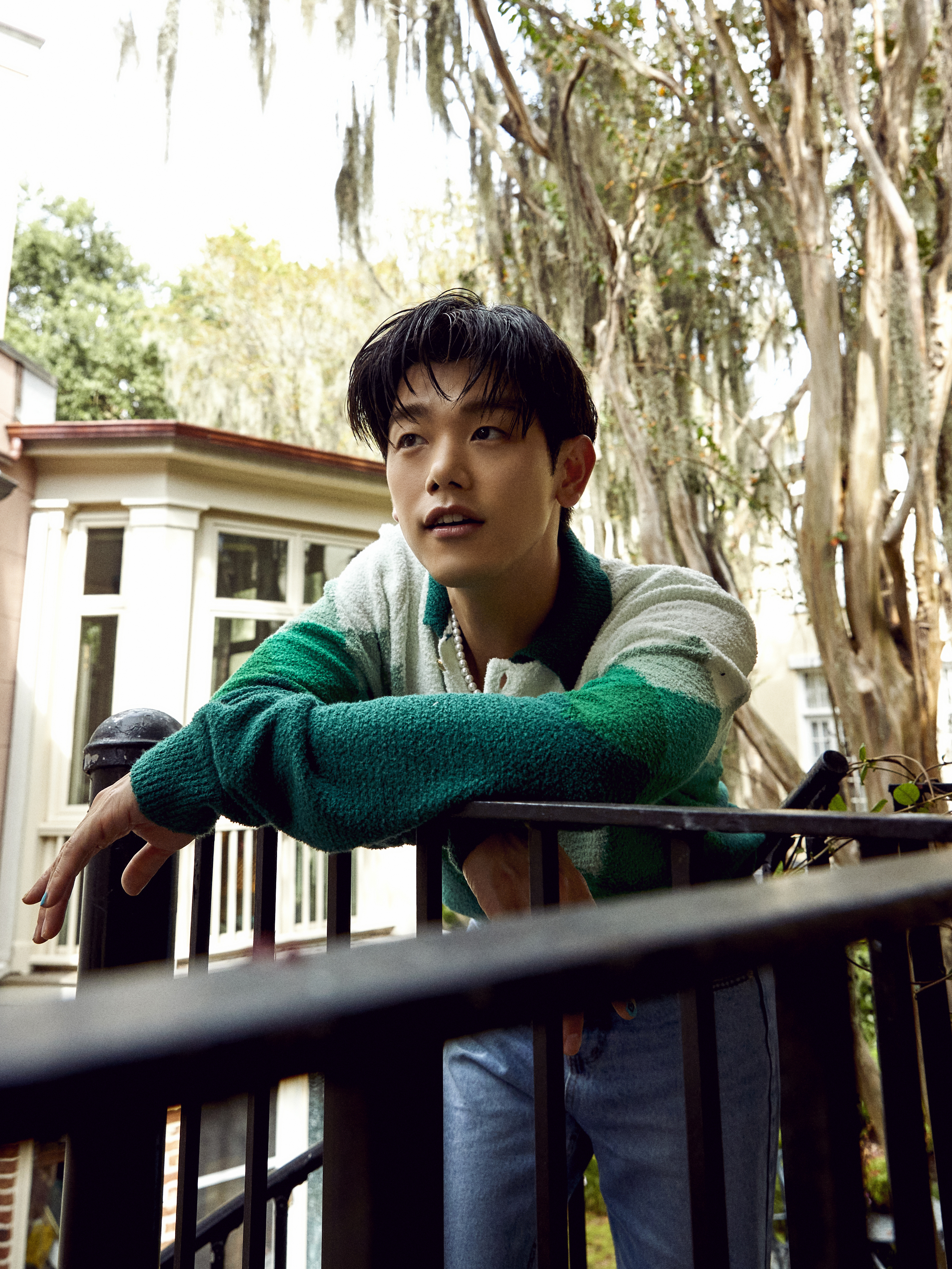
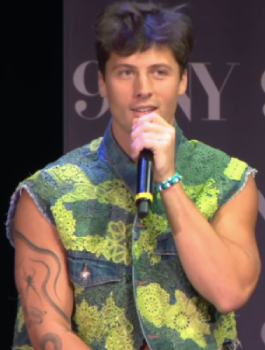
Top row (L-R): Ian Terry, Porsha Williams, Caroline Stanbury, Monét X Change, Michael Rapaport, Ron Funches, Lisa Rinna, Colton Underwood, and Candiace Dillard Bassett Bottom row (L-R): Dorinda Medley, Stephen Colletti, Kristen Kish, Mark Ballas, Johnny Weir, Tara Lipinski, Eric Nam, Maura Higgins, and Rob Rausch

Similar to the second and third seasons, this season's cast was composed entirely of reality show participants and public figures. Peacock announced the 23 cast members via social media on June 13, 2025.

In the first episode, Cumming revealed that one contestant would be selected as a "Secret Traitor", whose identity would be hidden from both the audience and the regular Traitors. Each night, they would provide the Traitors with a shortlist of Faithful to murder. Contestants were therefore only initially identified as Faithful by appearing on murder shortlists selected by the Secret Traitor, or after being banished.

List of The Traitors contestants
Contestant	Age	From	Notability/Debut series	Affiliation	Finish
Ian Terry	34	Houston, Texas	Big Brother 14	Faithful	Murdered (Episode 2)
Porsha Williams	43	Atlanta, Georgia	The Real Housewives of Atlanta	Faithful	Banished (Episode 2)
Rob Cesternino	46	Wake Forest, North Carolina	Survivor: The Amazon	Faithful	Murdered (Episode 3)
Donna Kelce	72	Orlando, Florida	Mother of Jason and Travis Kelce	Secret Traitor (Note: In Episode 1, Kelce was selected as the Secret Traitor. This was hidden from both the Traitors and the viewers until Episode 3, when she was banished.)	Banished (Episode 3)
Caroline Stanbury	49	Dubai, United Arab Emirates	The Real Housewives of Dubai / Ladies of London	Faithful	Murdered (Episode 4)
Tiffany Mitchell	44	Detroit, Michigan	Big Brother 23	Faithful	Banished (Episode 4)
Monét X Change	35	New York, New York	RuPaul's Drag Race 10	Faithful	Murdered (Episode 5)
Michael Rapaport	55	Los Angeles, California	Actor / Comedian	Faithful	Banished (Episode 5)
Ron Funches	42	Portland, Oregon	Actor / Comedian	Faithful	Banished (Episode 6)
Yamil "Yam Yam" Arocho	38	San Juan, Puerto Rico	Survivor 44	Faithful	Murdered (Episode 7)
Lisa Rinna	61	Beverly Hills, California	The Real Housewives of Beverly Hills	Traitor	Banished (Episode 7)
Colton Underwood	33	Sherman Oaks, California	The Bachelorette 14	Faithful	Murdered (Episode 8)
Candiace Dillard Bassett	38	Washington, D.C.	The Real Housewives of Potomac	Traitor	Banished (Episode 8)
Dorinda Medley The Traitors 3	60	New York, New York	The Real Housewives of New York City	Faithful	Murdered (Episode 9)
Stephen Colletti	39	Los Angeles, California	Laguna Beach: The Real Orange County	Faithful	Banished (Episode 9)
Kristen Kish	41	Austin, Texas	Top Chef: Seattle	Faithful	Murdered (Episode 10)
Natalie Anderson	39	Edgewater, New Jersey	The Amazing Race 21	Faithful	Banished (Episode 10)
Mark Ballas	39	Los Angeles, California	Dancing with the Stars	Faithful	Murdered (Episode 11)
Johnny Weir	40	Greenville, Delaware	Olympic figure skater	Faithful	Banished (Episode 11)
Tara Lipinski	43	Los Angeles, California	Olympic figure skater	Faithful	Banished (Episode 11)
Eric Nam	36	Atlanta, Georgia	Musician / Actor	Traitor (Note: Nam was recruited as a Traitor in Episode 9 following an ultimatum.)	Banished (Episode 11)
Maura Higgins	34	Longford, Ireland	Love Island UK 5	Faithful	Runner-up (Episode 11)
Rob Rausch	26	Florence, Alabama	Love Island USA 5	Traitor	Winner (Episode 11)

=== Future appearances ===
In 2026, Maura Higgins competed on season 35 of Dancing with the Stars. Later, it was revealed that Higgins would be paired with fellow faithful Mark Ballas.

== Episodes ==
The Traitors season 4 episodes
No. overall	No. in season	Title	Original release date
36	1	"Let the Cards Fall As They Will"	January 8, 2026
37	2	"The Death Conga"	January 8, 2026
38	3	"Show Me Your Faces"	January 8, 2026
39	4	"Cut the Head off the Snake"	January 15, 2026
40	5	"If You're Gonna Come for Me, I'll Finish You"	January 15, 2026
41	6	"Planning a Coup"	January 22, 2026
42	7	"The Black Banquet"	January 29, 2026
43	8	"A Queen Never Comes Off Her Throne"	February 5, 2026
44	9	"Think Outside the Box"	February 12, 2026
45	10	"Do You Know the Enemy?"	February 19, 2026
46	11	"Leap of Faith"	February 26, 2026
47	12	"Reunion"	February 26, 2026

== Voting history ==
Key
The contestant was a Faithful
The contestant was a Traitor

Episode	1	2	3	4	5	6	7	8	9		10	11
Murder Shortlist	None	Eric; Ian; Mark; Rob R. (Note: The Secret Traitor shortlisted these contestants for murder. The other Traitors could only choose a Faithful from this shortlist to be murdered that night.)	Kristen; Monét; Rob C.; Tara	Caroline; Eric; Kristen; Lisa; Ron (Note: In the daily mission, the contestants paired up and had to choose one to be caged while the other attempted to free them. Any remaining caged contestant was shortlisted for murder. As Ron did not have a partner, he was shortlisted by default.)	None						Johnny; Kristen; Natalie; Tara (Note: In the daily mission, the Traitors were tasked to shortlist four players for possible murder. At night, the shortlisted players were summoned to the dungeon where each were given a jack-in-a-box. The player who had a Traitor inside meant they were murdered by the Traitors.)	None
Traitors' Decision	None	Ian	Rob C. (Note: The Traitors were tasked to murder one of the Secret Traitor's shortlist in plain sight, by burning one of the faithful's cards in the fireplace inside the breakfast room. If successful, they would be able to meet the Secret Traitor face-to-face the following night. Although the Traitors were successful in their mission, Donna was banished and revealed as the Secret Traitor before their appointed meeting.)	Caroline	Monét	Lisa	Yam Yam (Note: The Traitors were tasked to murder in plain sight, by selecting a Traitor to wear a cursed amulet. At the banquet, the first faithful to touch the amulet would be murdered. Yam Yam was the first faithful to touch the amulet and was cursed for death. The players were presented with two antidotes to save the cursed player. As Kristen and Natalie were chosen, they were unsuccessful and Yam Yam was still murdered.)	Colton	Eric	Dorinda	Kristen	Mark
Traitors' Decision	None	Murder				Amulet	Murder		Ultimatum (Note: Following Candiace's banishment, Rob R. was offered the chance to meet a Faithful face-to-face and offer them an ultimatum: become a Traitor or be Murdered. He chose Eric, who accepted the offer.)	Murder		
Shield	Candiace; Caroline; Colton; Johnny; Kristen; Lisa; Maura; Monét; Natalie; Porsha; Stephen; Tara; Tiffany; Yam Yam	Caroline; Colton; Yam Yam	None	Candiace; Colton; Dorinda; Johnny; Mark; Natalie; Rob R.; Tiffany	All (Note: The players successfully completed the mission without obtaining a shield, preventing the Traitors from committing a murder. However, the Traitors still met to discuss who should wear a cursed amulet.)	Kristen; Natalie (Note: Kristen and Natalie received antidotes during the Banquet.)	None	Kristen	None		Eric	None
Banishment	None	Porsha	Donna	Tiffany	Michael	Ron	Lisa	Candiace	Stephen		Natalie	Johnny
Vote	None	10–8–4	18–1–1	15–2–1	11–5	6–5–4	9–2–1–1	9–1–1	5–2–2		7–1	3–2
Rob R.	No; Vote	Porsha	Donna	Tiffany	Michael	Lisa	Lisa	Candiace	Stephen		Natalie (2x) (Note: Rob R. won the Dagger in a daily challenge, making his vote count twice at one of the next four roundtables. He used it at the roundtable in Episode 10.)	Johnny
Maura	No; Vote	Porsha	Donna	Tiffany	Michael	Ron	Lisa	Candiace	Johnny		Natalie	Johnny
Eric	No; Vote	Porsha	Donna	Tiffany	Michael	Lisa	Lisa	Candiace	Stephen		Natalie	Johnny
Tara	No; Vote	Donna	Donna	Tiffany	Michael	Colton	Natalie	Candiace	Stephen		Natalie	Eric
Johnny	No; Vote	Donna	Donna	Tiffany	Michael	Colton	Lisa	Candiace	Stephen		Natalie	Eric
Mark	No; Vote	Porsha	Donna	Tiffany	Michael	Ron	Lisa	Candiace	Tara		Natalie	Murdered (Episode 11)
Natalie	No; Vote	Donna	Donna	Tiffany	Michael	Lisa	Lisa	Tara	Stephen		Tara	Banished (Episode 10)
Kristen	No; Vote	Donna	Donna	Tiffany	Michael	Colton	Lisa	Candiace	Tara		Murdered (Episode 10)	
Stephen	No; Vote	Porsha	Donna	Tiffany	Ron	Ron	Lisa	Candiace	Johnny		Banished (Episode 9)	
Dorinda	No; Vote	Donna	Donna	Tiffany	Ron	Ron	Maura	Candiace	Murdered (Episode 9)			
Candiace	No; Vote	Donna	Donna	Ron	Ron	Ron	Rob R.	Rob R.	Banished (Episode 8)			
Colton	No; Vote	Porsha	Donna	Tiffany	Michael	Lisa	Lisa	Murdered (Episode 8)				
Lisa	No; Vote	Porsha	Donna	Tiffany	Ron	Colton	Natalie	Banished (Episode 7)				
Yam Yam	No; Vote	Michael	Donna	Tiffany	Michael	Ron	Murdered (Episode 7)					
Ron	No; Vote	Porsha	Donna	Tiffany	Michael	Lisa	Banished (Episode 6)					
Michael	No; Vote	Porsha	Yam Yam	Ron	Ron	Banished (Episode 5)						
Monét	No; Vote	Michael	Donna	Tiffany	Murdered (Episode 5)							
Tiffany	No; Vote	Michael	Donna	Yam Yam	Banished (Episode 4)							
Caroline	No; Vote	Donna	Donna	Murdered (Episode 4)								
Donna	No; Vote	Porsha	Michael	Banished (Episode 3)								
Rob C.	No; Vote	Michael	Murdered (Episode 3)									
Porsha	No; Vote	Donna	Banished (Episode 2)									
Ian	No; Vote	Murdered (Episode 2)										

=== End game ===
Episode	11				
Decision	Banish	Tara	Banish	Eric	Game Over; Traitor Win
Vote	4–0	3–1	2–1	2–1	Game Over; Traitor Win
Rob R.	Banish	Tara	Banish	Eric	Winner
Maura	Banish	Tara	Banish	Eric	Runner-up
Eric	Banish	Tara	End Game	Rob R.	Banished
Tara	Banish	Eric	Banished		

== Missions ==
Episode	Title	Money available	Money earned	Total pot	Shield winner
1	"Let the Cards Fall As They Will"	$30,000	$22,500	$22,500	Candiace
1	"Let the Cards Fall As They Will"	$30,000	$22,500	$22,500	Caroline
1	"Let the Cards Fall As They Will"	$30,000	$22,500	$22,500	Colton
1	"Let the Cards Fall As They Will"	$30,000	$22,500	$22,500	Johnny
1	"Let the Cards Fall As They Will"	$30,000	$22,500	$22,500	Kristen
1	"Let the Cards Fall As They Will"	$30,000	$22,500	$22,500	Lisa
1	"Let the Cards Fall As They Will"	$30,000	$22,500	$22,500	Maura
1	"Let the Cards Fall As They Will"	$30,000	$22,500	$22,500	Monét
1	"Let the Cards Fall As They Will"	$30,000	$22,500	$22,500	Natalie
1	"Let the Cards Fall As They Will"	$30,000	$22,500	$22,500	Porsha
1	"Let the Cards Fall As They Will"	$30,000	$22,500	$22,500	Stephen
1	"Let the Cards Fall As They Will"	$30,000	$22,500	$22,500	Tara
1	"Let the Cards Fall As They Will"	$30,000	$22,500	$22,500	Tiffany
1	"Let the Cards Fall As They Will"	$30,000	$22,500	$22,500	Yam Yam
2	"The Death Conga"	$24,000	$22,500	$45,000	Caroline
2	"The Death Conga"	$24,000	$22,500	$45,000	Colton
2	"The Death Conga"	$24,000	$22,500	$45,000	Yam Yam
3	"Show Me Your Faces"	$45,000	$25,000	$70,000	—N/a
4	"Cut the Head off the Snake"	$20,000	$20,000	$90,000	Candiace
4	"Cut the Head off the Snake"	$20,000	$20,000	$90,000	Colton
4	"Cut the Head off the Snake"	$20,000	$20,000	$90,000	Dorinda
4	"Cut the Head off the Snake"	$20,000	$20,000	$90,000	Eric
4	"Cut the Head off the Snake"	$20,000	$20,000	$90,000	Kristen
4	"Cut the Head off the Snake"	$20,000	$20,000	$90,000	Mark
4	"Cut the Head off the Snake"	$20,000	$20,000	$90,000	Natalie
4	"Cut the Head off the Snake"	$20,000	$20,000	$90,000	Rob R
5	"If You're Gonna Come for Me, I'll Finish You"	$16,000	$16,000	$106,000	Candiace
5	"If You're Gonna Come for Me, I'll Finish You"	$16,000	$16,000	$106,000	Colton
5	"If You're Gonna Come for Me, I'll Finish You"	$16,000	$16,000	$106,000	Dorinda
5	"If You're Gonna Come for Me, I'll Finish You"	$16,000	$16,000	$106,000	Eric
5	"If You're Gonna Come for Me, I'll Finish You"	$16,000	$16,000	$106,000	Johnny
5	"If You're Gonna Come for Me, I'll Finish You"	$16,000	$16,000	$106,000	Kristen
5	"If You're Gonna Come for Me, I'll Finish You"	$16,000	$16,000	$106,000	Lisa
5	"If You're Gonna Come for Me, I'll Finish You"	$16,000	$16,000	$106,000	Mark
5	"If You're Gonna Come for Me, I'll Finish You"	$16,000	$16,000	$106,000	Maura
5	"If You're Gonna Come for Me, I'll Finish You"	$16,000	$16,000	$106,000	Natalie
5	"If You're Gonna Come for Me, I'll Finish You"	$16,000	$16,000	$106,000	Rob R.
5	"If You're Gonna Come for Me, I'll Finish You"	$16,000	$16,000	$106,000	Ron
5	"If You're Gonna Come for Me, I'll Finish You"	$16,000	$16,000	$106,000	Stephen
5	"If You're Gonna Come for Me, I'll Finish You"	$16,000	$16,000	$106,000	Tara
5	"If You're Gonna Come for Me, I'll Finish You"	$16,000	$16,000	$106,000	Yam Yam
6	"Planning a Coup"	$18,000	$15,000	$121,000	—N/a
7	"The Black Banquet"	$25,000	$17,800	$138,800	—N/a
8	"A Queen Never Comes Off Her Throne"	$18,000	$12,000	$150,800	Kristen
9	"Think Outside the Box"	$18,000	$5,500	$156,300	—N/a
10	"Do You Know the Enemy?"	$30,000	$24,500	$180,800	Eric
11	"Leap of Faith"	$40,000	$40,000	$220,800	—N/a

== Production ==
Similar to the previous seasons, this season was primary filmed in Ardross Castle in the Scottish Highlands.
