= The Traitors (British TV series) series 1 =

2022 series of The Traitors

The Traitors
- Series 1
- Promotional poster
- Presented by: Claudia Winkleman
- No. of contestants: 22
- Winners: Aaron Evans; Hannah Byczkowski; Meryl Williams
- Location: Ardross, Highland
- No. of episodes: 12

Release
- Original network: BBC One
- Original release: 29 November – 22 December 2022

Series chronology
- Next → Series 2

The first series of The Traitors was first broadcast on BBC One on 29 November 2022. The series concluded on 22 December 2022 where Hannah Byczkowski, Aaron Evans and Meryl Williams won as Faithfuls, while Wilfred "Wilf" Webster placed as a runner-up, as a Traitor.

== Contestants ==
22 contestants competed on the first series of The Traitors. In a minor twist, Alex and Tom had a pre-existing relationship as they were dating before competing in the series.

Amos and Kieran were apparently banished from the game on arrival at the castle, after placing themselves at the end of a line of most and least likely to win the show. However, they were both reintroduced to the show in a twist during episode 5.

List of The Traitors contestants
| Contestant | Age | Residence | Occupation | Affiliation | Finish |
|---|---|---|---|---|---|
| Aisha Birley | 23 | Manchester, England | Masters Graduate | Faithful | Murdered (Episode 2) |
| Nicky Wilding | 45 | South Croydon, England | Accounts supervisor | Faithful | Banished (Episode 2) |
| Claire Barratt | 43 | Hull, England | Ex-police officer & entrepreneur | Faithful | Murdered (Episode 3) |
| Imran Nasim | 23 | Burgess Hill, England | Scientist | Faithful | Banished (Episode 3) |
| Ivan Brett | 32 | Polruan, England | Author | Faithful | Banished (Episode 5) |
| John McManus | 49 | Edinburgh, Scotland | Spa therapist | Faithful | Murdered (Episode 5) |
| Tom Elderfield | 24 | Chesham, England | Magician | Faithful | Banished (Episode 5) |
| Matt Harris | 23 | Melbourn, England | BMX Athlete | Faithful | Murdered (Episode 6) |
| Alyssa Chan | 21 | Cork, Ireland | Business student | Traitor | Banished (Episode 6) |
| Rayan Rachedi | 25 | North London, England | Trainee lawyer | Faithful | Banished (Episode 7) |
| Alex Gray | 26 | London, England | Presenter & actress | Faithful | Murdered (Episode 8) |
| Amos Ogunkoya | 30 | North London, England | Doctor | Faithful | Murdered (Episode 9) |
| Theo Mayne | 26 | Leeds, England | Cheerleading coach | Faithful | Banished (Episode 9) |
| Fay Greaves | 59 | Bury St Edmunds, England | Head of School Welfare | Faithful | Murdered (Episode 10) |
| Amanda Lovett | 54 | Swansea, Wales | Estate agent | Traitor | Banished (Episode 10) |
| Andrea Addison | 72 | Brussels, Belgium | Retired | Faithful | Murdered (Episode 11) |
| Madelyn "Maddy" Smedley | 29 | Swanley, England | Receptionist & actress | Faithful | Banished (Episode 11) |
| Kieran Tompsett | 42 | Stevenage, England | Solutions consultant | Traitor (Note: Kieran started the game as a Faithful but became a Traitor in Episode 11 following an ultimatum.) | Banished (Episode 12) |
| Wilfred "Wilf" Webster | 28 | North London, England | Senior fundraiser | Traitor | Banished (Episode 12) |
| Aaron Evans | 24 | Portsmouth, England | Property agent | Faithful | Winner (Episode 12) |
| Hannah Byczkowski | 32 | London, England | Comedian | Faithful | Winner (Episode 12) |
| Meryl Williams | 25 | Edinburgh, Scotland | Call centre agent | Faithful | Winner (Episode 12) |

== Elimination history ==
Key

The contestant was a Faithful.
The contestant was a Traitor.
The contestant was murdered by the Traitors.
The contestant was banished at the round table.
The contestant was ineligible to vote.
The contestant was immune for the banishment and subsequent murder.

| Episode | 2 | 3 | 4 | 5 | 6 | 7 | 8 | 9 | 10 | | 11 | 12 |
|---|---|---|---|---|---|---|---|---|---|---|---|---|
| Traitors' Decision | Aisha | Claire | Alex; Ivan; John | John | Matt | Alex | Alex | Amos (Note: Amos was murdered during the Dinner Party on Episode 8 by a Traitor giving him a "Kiss of Death". This murder was only revealed to the viewers and the other players during Episode 9's Breakfast.) | Fay | Kieran | Andrea | None |
| Traitors' Decision | Murder | | On trial (Note: Alex, Ivan & John were put on Trial by the Traitors – they became the only people who could be Murdered the following night.) | Murder | | Seduce | Murder | | | Ultimatum | Murder | None |
| Immune | None | | | Amos; Kieran; Tom | Amanda | Fay | Maddy | Meryl | None | | | None |
| Banishment | Nicky | Imran | Ivan (Note: Although the roundtable started in Episode 4, Ivan was banished in Episode 5.) | Tom | Alyssa | Rayan | None (Note: There was no Banishment, as Claudia hosted a dinner party for the players. At the party, they played a "Party Game". Starting with Amanda (who volunteered), each player selected the player who they most trusted. This chain went on until Maddy was the only player left. She was offered the £3,000 from that day's Mission as a bribe to leave the game. She declined.) | Theo | Amanda | | Maddy | Kieran |
| Vote | 17–1–1 | 10–6–1 | 7–6–2–1 | 7–4–1– 1–1 | 6–5–2–1 | 7–3–2–1 | None | 6–2–2 | 4–2–1–1 | | 4–2 | 4–1 |
| Aaron | Imran | Imran | Alex | Tom | Rayan | Maddy | No vote | Theo | Maddy | | Maddy | Kieran |
| Hannah | Nicky | Imran | Alex | Alex | Alyssa | Rayan | No vote | Maddy | Amanda | | Maddy | Kieran |
| Meryl | Nicky | Imran | Ivan | Tom | Maddy | Rayan | No vote | Maddy | Amanda | | Maddy | Kieran |
| Wilfred | Nicky | Aaron | Ivan | Alex | Alyssa | Maddy | No vote | Theo | Amanda | | Maddy | Kieran |
| Kieran | Eliminated | | | No vote | Wilfred | Rayan | No vote | Theo | Amanda | | Meryl | Wilfred |
| Maddy | Nicky | Aaron | Wilfred | Wilfred | Wilfred | Meryl | No vote | Aaron | Aaron | | Meryl | Banished (Episode 11) |
| Andrea | Nicky | Aaron | Hannah | Tom | Alyssa | Rayan | No vote | Theo | Hannah | | Murdered (Episode 11) | |
| Amanda | Nicky | Imran | Ivan | Alex | Alyssa | Rayan | No vote | Theo | Maddy | | Banished (Episode 10) | |
| Fay | Nicky | Imran | Alex | Tom | Rayan | Maddy | No vote | Theo | Murdered (Episode 10) | | | |
| Theo | Nicky | Imran | Alex | Tom | Wilfred | Rayan | No vote | Aaron | Banished (Episode 9) | | | |
| Amos | Eliminated | | | No vote | Wilfred | Rayan | No vote | Murdered (Episode 9) | | | | |
| Alex | Nicky | Imran | Ivan | Rayan | Alyssa | Aaron | Murdered (Episode 8) | | | | | |
| Rayan | Nicky | Aaron | Alex | Tom | Alyssa | Aaron | Banished (Episode 7) | | | | | |
| Alyssa | Nicky | Aaron | Hannah | Alex | Wilfred | Banished (Episode 6) | | | | | | |
| Matt | Nicky | Imran | Ivan | Tom | Murdered (Episode 6) | | | | | | | |
| Tom | Nicky | Imran | Ivan | Alyssa | Banished (Episode 5) | | | | | | | |
| John | Nicky | Aaron | Ivan | Murdered (Episode 5) | | | | | | | | |
| Ivan | Nicky | Imran | Alex | Banished (Episode 4) | | | | | | | | |
| Imran | Nicky | Theo | Banished (Episode 3) | | | | | | | | | |
| Claire | Nicky | Murdered (Episode 3) | | | | | | | | | | |
| Nicky | Fay | Banished (Episode 2) | | | | | | | | | | |
| Aisha | Murdered (Episode 2) | | | | | | | | | | | |

=== End game ===
| Episode | 12 | | | |
|---|---|---|---|---|
| Decision | Banish | Wilfred | End Game | Game Over; Faithfuls Win |
| Vote | 2–2 | 3–1 | 3–0 | Game Over; Faithfuls Win |
| Aaron | Banish | Wilfred | End Game | Winners |
| Hannah | Banish | Wilfred | End Game | Winners |
| Meryl | End Game | Wilfred | End Game | Winners |
| Wilfred | End Game | Aaron | Banished | |

== Missions ==
| Episode | Task description | Time limit | Money earned | Money available | Running total | Shield winner |
|---|---|---|---|---|---|---|
| 1 | Split into two teams to build a fuse and set fire to a wicker man. While one half of each team was searching debris on the side of the lake for rope to create the fuse, the other half had to row back across the lake with a torch to light their fuse. The first fuse lit was worth £10,000 and the second £5,000. | 30 minutes | £15,000 | £15,000 | £15,000 | No Shield on offer |
| 2 | Eight of the contestants had to ring the bells of the nearby chapel to play a tune, while the remaining contestants searched the Castle for a music box that was playing the same tune. Each music box contained an item – a larger version of which was hidden in the Castle. Each correct item brought back was worth £2,000 for the prize fund. | —N/a | £8,000 | £10,000 | £23,000 (of £25,000) | No Shield on offer |
| 3 | Five contestants' names were randomly drawn from a tombola and they would be strapped to a revolving funfair wheel, while the remaining contestants answered Mr & Mrs-style questions. For each answer that matches with someone on the wheel, they would earn £100 for the prize fund – and they would also earn a £2,500 bonus if everyone stayed on the wheel for ten minutes. There are two rounds – each with a potential prize of £5,000 to be won. | —N/a | £8,700 | £10,000 | £31,700 (of £35,000) | No Shield on offer |
| 4 | Split into three teams – led by those on Trial. Each team sent one person into a pen full of sheep while their team described a photo of one of the sheep. The person in the pen had to work out which sheep was being described – and each sheep was wearing a coat with the name of a contestant on it. After each round, more sheep were added. Each correct sheep identified by a team would earn £1,000 for the prize fund and the fastest team would be given the chance to earn an extra £1,000 if they could round up all of the sheep within two minutes. | Unlimited; 2 minutes (final round) | £8,000 | £10,000 | £39,700 (of £45,000) | No Shield on offer |
| 5 | The contestants were split into two teams and one at a time went into the confessional booth to hear a page and paragraph reference from Claudia. They had to then bring that reference back to Claudia and use The Book of Traitors to find a riddle – leading to a clothing item worn by one member of the masked congregation. Only the first team to identify an item counted, and each correctly identified item earned £2,000 for the pot. The team who identifies the most correct items fastest would be given the first opportunity to visit the Armoury and potentially earn a Shield. In addition, Amos and Kieran were revealed after the challenge to be two of the masked congregation. After a fifth tiebreaker round, Alex, Amanda, Hannah, Meryl, Theo, Tom & Wilfred were sent to the Armoury. | —N/a | £8,000 | £8,000 | £47,700 (of £53,000) | Tom |
| 6 | Split into three teams, two members of each team were buried in underground graves and it was up to the remaining team members to uncover them within 45 minutes. Each person who escaped their grave was worth £1,500 for the prize fund and the fastest team to uncover their two teammates would win a trip to the Armoury. Aaron, Alex, Amanda, Hannah & Theo were the first team to be complete, and were sent to the Armoury. | 45 minutes | £9,000 | £9,000 | £56,700 (of £62,000) | Amanda |
| 7 | As a group, the contestants had 90 minutes to transport whisky barrels to an old distillery on the top of a nearby hill. Along the way, they would find more barrels of increasing size worth more money, as well as five barrels, which would allow contestants of their choice to enter the Armoury. In addition to £8,400 worth of barrels, three of the five Armoury barrels crossed the finish line – and Andrea, Fay & Theo were chosen to enter the Armoury. | 90 minutes | £8,400 | £10,000 | £65,100 (of £72,000) | Fay |
| 8 | Split into two teams, contestants had to escape a Fishing cabin-themed escape room. For each team who escaped, they would add £3,000 to the prize fund – and the fastest team to escape would be given the opportunity to enter the Armoury. Only the Green Team – Fay, Hannah, Kieran, Maddy, Meryl and Wilfred – escaped in the time limit, and they entered the Armoury. | 25 minutes | £3,000 | £6,000 | £68,100 (of £78,000) | Maddy |
| 9 | Split into three teams, contestants would drive a route and encounter True or False statements. If they pick the incorrect answer, they would hit a dead end. Teams had 45 minutes to complete their route, and each team who completed the route would earn £2,000 for the prize fund. The fastest team to complete the route would also be given the opportunity to enter the Armoury, where one of them would win the Shield. The Blue Team – Kieran, Meryl & Wilfred – were the first team back and won their tickets to the Armoury. | 45 minutes | £6,000 | £6,000 | £74,100 (of £84,000) | Meryl |
| 10 | The contestants were given twenty minutes to individually make their way through a room and steal artifacts which were protected by lasers. Each artifact was worth a set amount of money for the prize fund. Breaking a laser would cost the group one minute of time and any artifacts being carried would be lost. After all eight contestants have made an attempt, they are then given a second opportunity. On their first pass, only Wilfred (£2,000) and Aaron (£1,000) collected artifacts and on their second pass, Wilfred (£400) and Kieran (£300) collected artifacts. There was a shield among the artifacts which would keep them safe from murder, but no-one went for it. | 20 minutes | £3,700 | £7,000 | £77,800 (of £91,000) | Shield not picked |
| 11 | Suspended over a rickety bridge above a river are bags with different values – ranging from £500 to £2,000. One at a time, blindfolded contestants will go out onto the bridge and be guided by their teammates to collect bags. They have eight minutes each to get their money across the bridge – anyone who falls is out, alongside their money. Only Meryl (£500), Maddy (£750) and Aaron (£2,000) got across the bridge – adding £3,250 to the prize fund. | 8 minutes each | £3,250 | £7,000 | £81,050 (of £98,000) | No Shield on offer |
| 12 | Dotted around Loch Glass are moneybags totalling £20,000. The two strongest swimmers – Aaron & Hannah – had to jump out of a helicopter to swim to a pair of buoys to get the combination to find speedboat keys and a map in a box. The remaining three then had to collect the swimmers before they used the speedboat to find the moneybags in four separate locations over the ten miles of coastline within 30 minutes. | 30 minutes | £20,000 | £20,000 | £101,050 (of £118,000) | No Shield on offer |

== Reception ==
Series 1 of The Traitors received mixed-to-positive reception, with critics praising the work of host Claudia Winkleman, the season's atmosphere, and its entertaining moments. Primary criticisms were mainly aimed at the show's cast and struggle to choose an age demographic. On review aggregator website Rotten Tomatoes, it holds an approval rating of 67% based on 6 reviews, with an average rating of 8.00/10. Isobel Lewis of The Independent gave the show 3 out of 5 stars, embracing the show's entertainment factor, writing "The Traitors definitely isn’t a perfect reality show, or even the best in its genre right now, but it is pretty entertaining. Plus, there’s something incredibly satisfying about watching a contestant claim that their fellow player is “a really honest person”, while we sit at home smirking in the knowledge that they're really a traitor". Rating the series 5 stars out of 5, Michael Hogan of The Telegraph praised the show's finale, saying it was "dramatic, deliciously dark and just camp enough, this was old-fashioned event TV". Fiona Sturges of Financial Times praised the show for its twists and turns, writing "On paper, it might sound like a zhuzhed-up version of Cluedo or the children’s game wink murder. In practice, it is a brilliant recipe for multi-layered manoeuvring and top-tier bluffing."

Alison Rowat of The Herald was critical of the show's identity, stating the season was "safe, sanitised and deadly dull", adding that "[it is] too silly for older viewers, too bland for the younger streaming crowd, it would be a better fit for BBC3 but here it is, occupying a prime slot over three week nights. Now there's a mystery." Rachel Cooke of The New Statesman was critical of the show, calling it "complicated where it should be straightforward; which aspires to a vague cleverness where it should really aim only for rank stupidity".

== Episodes ==
| No. overall | No. in series | Title | Original release date | UK viewers (millions) |
|---|---|---|---|---|
| 1 | 1 | "Episode 1" | 29 November 2022 | 3.88 |
22 contestants arrived at a castle in Scotland to play the ultimate murder mystery. Upon arrival, Claudia greeted the contestants and asked them to form a line based on how likely they were to win the game. Kieran and Amos put themselves at the end of the line in a tactic to be underestimated but Claudia revealed that if they truly had so little confidence in their ability to win they might as well not play it. Kieran and Amos were immediately banished from the game shocking everyone. Alex formed a close bond with Matt but admitted in her confessional that she was secretly in a relationship with fellow contestant Tom. The pair had entered the game together and decided to keep their relationship a secret. Both Maddy and Alex decided to conceal part of their jobs - acting and psychology respectively - to secure their positions a bit more. The mechanics of the game were explained. Claudia would select traitors who would murder a player every night. Then, after the daily missions to fill the prize pot, players would vote to banish someone at the round table. If a traitor was banished they could choose to recruit someone from the remaining pool of faithfuls. At the round table, Claudia selected Wilf, Amanda and Alyssa to be the three traitors. After the blindfolds came off, Alyssa immediately directed suspicion onto Nicky with Maddy and John for not joining in a toast to the success of the faithful. Mission: The players were divided into two teams to build fuses to two giant wicker men. Half of each team would row across the loch to get a torch to light the fuse. The players successfully banked £15,000. Alyssa continued to push the fact Nicky hadn’t toasted the faithful. Meanwhile Matt admitted to liking Alex. The traitors were sworn in with the traitor’s oath and met each other in the turret for the first time to decide on who to murder.
| 2 | 2 | "Episode 2" | 30 November 2022 | 3.14 |
The next morning, Aisha was revealed as the first victim. Ivan wondered if Aaron, who had admitted to fancying Aisha, was potentially being set up. Matt admitted in his confessional that he fancied Alex while she was worried Tom had been murdered. Mission: The players were split into two teams. One team went to the church to play a tune on the bells which the Castle Team had to find a matching music box for. The music box had a matching object they had to bring to Claudia. The players banked £8000. At the round table: Players were initially hesitant to begin due to a lack of evidence. Hannah said she had an idea of someone who she thought perhaps didn’t want to be a traitor but did not say a name; Alyssa brought up how Nicky hadn’t joined in the toast. Nicky explained that because she didn’t have a right arm it wasn’t natural for her to reach for the glass. However it seemed with nothing else to go with, the group voted for Nicky banishing her with 17 votes. She revealed she was a faithful. Afterwards, Aaron pointed out that many players had different suspicions before but had instead chosen to jump on the bandwagon.
| 3 | 3 | "Episode 3" | 1 December 2022 | <2.71 (Note: This episode did not make it into the top 50 most viewed programmes of the week and therefore full figures are not available.) |
Claire was the next faithful to be murdered. Theo in particular was quite upset since they had grown quite close in the game. Wilf also seemed upset which caught the attention of Maddy who believed he was faking it. She also believed Aaron was a traitor because he had not joined the group and voted for Imran at the previous round table. She voiced these suspicions to several players including Alyssa and Amanda. Alyssa attempted to defend Wilf by saying to look for charismatic players but Maddy said Wilf fit that description. Mission: The players were split into groups with five strapped to a spinning wheel with the other players having to answer questions about them as a group answer. The five would also answer the questions and for every match money would be added. If the players stayed on the wheel the whole mission, money would also be added. Theo, Matt, John, Wilf and Fay were the first five on the wheel. John was voted most likely to be faithful, Fay was voted most ruthless and most two faced. In the second round, Alex, Meryl, Andrea, Maddy, and Rayan were on the wheel. Maddy was voted most gullible, Rayan most forgettable. The players banked £8700. In their confessionals, some players shared what they would do with the money. John seemed paranoid about Aaron asking him a lot of questions. He was convinced Amanda was faithful and wondered if Alex could be a traitor which Tom immediately shot down. Wilf was speculated to be a traitor by Tom, Andrea, and John for crying when Claire went. Alyssa promised that she and Amanda would defend Wilf after Maddy had brought his name up. At the round table: Maddy said she would vote for Aaron for voting against the group and that he and Wilf had been the only two to mention Imran’s name; Imran had come across as arrogant; Alyssa suggested Aaron as a suspect because he had been in the same group as Aisha and Claire and for being charismatic; John accused him of grilling him. When the vote seemed to be split between Aaron and Imran. Aaron left the table to calm down as Wilf voted for him with Wilf whispering that he’d messed up by doing so. Aaron returned to the table and Imran ended up being banished with 10 votes. He revealed himself as a faithful. Due to Aaron’s reaction, many players including Hannah believed he was faithful. Some other players thought he might have used it as a gameplay. Maddy thought that because Aaron had left during Wilf’s vote that they were both traitors and Wilf had betrayed him. Tom warned Wilf that a few players thought Wilf was suspicious for his emotional response to Claire leaving. Amanda and Alyssa warned him the same in the turret but said they had his back. Claudia entered and told the traitors instead of a murder they would put three players on trial and murder one of them the next night. They could also opt to put themselves in the mix. Wilf considered putting himself in but Amanda and Alyssa said it was a bad idea.
| 4 | 4 | "Episode 4" | 6 December 2022 | 3.33 |
The traitors decided to put Alex, John, and Ivan on trial. Tom and Alex were first in to breakfast and quickly discussed Ivan and Hannah as potential traitors. As Amanda was last in, some players thought she had murdered with Maddy speculating it was because she voted for Imran and they wanted to cover their backs with her main suspect being Wilf. Everyone was confused that no one had been murdered. Claudia explained the trial and who the three players were. The breakfast table ended up arguing with some players thinking a traitor could have put themselves up for trial and John storming out of the room. Tom panicked that Alex would either be banished or murdered and publicly announced that Alex wasn’t a traitor but his girlfriend shocking all of the other contestants (including Alex) particularly Matt. This led to another argument was Tom loudly insisting Ivan was a traitor with Maddy saying he was barking up the wrong tree and other players furious and distrustful that Tom and Alex had been lying to them for days. Tom also accused Hannah infuriating her and she accused him and Alex of lying and doing nothing for the past three days. Alex apologised for lying and defended the decision. Tom regretted the outburst fearing that he or Alex would be murdered or banished next. Others pointed out that Alex being Tom’s girlfriend didn’t absolve either of them since they could either be lying to or for each other. Matt was suspicious and upset with both of them for lying to him. Amanda publicly diffused the situation to encourage the team to work together while privately being gleeful of the chaos that had been caused. Hannah firmly believed either Tom or Alex were a traitor since they had shown ability to lie though Maddy thought she was only going after them for personal reasons. Alex told Tom she thought Alyssa was a traitor and he agreed due to how quiet but emotional she was. Tom confronted Alyssa about being a traitor. He also told Ivan he could read people and he was certain Hannah was a traitor. Ivan pointed out that Tom was reading him wrong as a traitor and was therefore unwilling to vote for Hannah. Tom saw it as Ivan defending Hannah. In the car to the mission, Tom shared a car with Andrea, Wilf and Alyssa loudly declaring that traitors should be mindful about defending each other because it would give them away and that he thought a traitor was in the car and they should backstab each other to go further. Mission: The contestants were split into teams led by those on trial. Each team sent one person into a pen full of sheep while their team described a photo of one of the sheep. The person in the pen had to work out which sheep was being described – and each sheep was wearing a coat with the name of a contestant on it. After each round, more sheep were added. Each correct sheep identified by a team would earn £1,000 for the prize fund and the fastest team would be given the chance to earn an extra £1,000 if they could round up all of the sheep within two minutes. The players banked £8000. Matt and Alex cleared the air between them. While Tom tried to convince people to vote for Ivan and Hannah. Though he believed Alyssa was also a traitor he decided not to tell anyone else. At the round table: Fay directed attention to the three trial as one or two traitors could be hiding amongst them; Ivan pointed out it would be too risky for two traitors to put themselves up in case the one faithful was banished. He believed that Alex was the single traitor among them as he and John had been open with their theories and she hadn’t; Tom called out Hannah and Ivan again believing that Ivan was defending Hannah and not backstabbing her like he had suggested; Maddy accused Wilf based on his vote causing Aaron to be upset with the theory that they were traitors with Wilf backstabbing Aaron; Alex called out Rayan and Alyssa as being quiet and flying under the radar; Tom asked if anyone thought Alyssa was a traitor with most players dismissing the idea (though he also believed she was a traitor he hoped to manipulate her to keep him in). Hannah told players to vote her out as she was sick of listening to Tom. Tom pushed for the players to banish Ivan and said if he revealed he was a faithful they could banish him tomorrow. The votes ended up tied with Alex and Ivan getting 6 votes each with Amanda’s deciding vote yet to be revealed.
| 5 | 5 | "Episode 5" | 7 December 2022 | 3.13 |
Though Amanda said she hated what Tom and Alex had done that day, ultimately she had voted for Ivan. Ivan was banished with 7 votes and revealed he was a faithful. Tom kicked himself for getting it wrong. Hannah was heavily suspicious of how much influence Tom had over the round table. The traitors met up to decide who to murder and went with John. Hannah was suspicious of how quiet Alyssa was and how she had voted for her at the previous round table with seemingly no reason. Rayan and Alex also told Wilf they were suspicious of her though Alex doubted her own judgement after being wrong about Ivan. Shield Mission: In the church, the contestants were split in two. Claudia would read a line to a member of each team who would run back and find it in a book. The line had a riddle where the answer matched an item of clothing worn by a group of masked churchgoers to earn gold. This was the first mission to introduce shields as the winning team would be able to visit the armory, find a shield and be protected from murder. At the end of the challenge, it was revealed that two of the masked figures were Kieran and Amos who returned to the game. Claudia warned that they could be entering as either faithful or traitors. Kieran and Amos were protected from banishment and murder and would observe the round table to get an understanding of what they had missed. Amos was shocked at how quickly players had become paranoid of each other. The audience was informed both he and Kieran were entering as faithful. In the armory, Tom found the shield. Beforehand, he had suggested they not reveal who got the shield to protect everyone on the team since the traitors would not want to risk missing a chance to murder. This, in effect, would protect Tom, Alex, Meryl, Hannah, Wilf, Amanda, and Theo from murder. At the round table: Tom apologised for his actions the previous day and to Hannah; Alex said that since there was little evidence she and Tom were just the easy targets; Matt called out how they had both lied to everyone; Maddy piped up causing everyone to laugh since most people did not think Wilf was a traitor. She loudly pointed at each player saying “faithful”, “traitor” or “not sure” to who she suspected. She accused Aaron and Wilf; many other theories were mentioned with Alex accusing Alyssa; Amanda pointed out how disorganized the table had become. She said Alyssa could be dramatic but she deflected attention away from her; Alex was also suspicious of Rayan for also being quiet; Fay believed Alex was Faithful but suspected Tom. Tom was banished with 7 votes and revealed he was a faithful. Alex in particular was upset at his banishment. The other players were disappointed they still hadn’t found a single traitor. The traitors met up to discuss who to murder. They discussed Fay, Andrea or Matt. Wilf and Amanda reassured Alyssa she had defended herself well and was likely off many people’s radar.
| 6 | 6 | "Episode 6" | 8 December 2022 | 3.37 |
The traitors decided to murder Matt. Amos and Kieran were convinced by Maddy’s arguments for Wilf. Alex and Hannah were still suspicious of Alyssa. Aaron was disappointed by Matt’s murder since they had been close friends in the castle. Alyssa tried to plant seeds about Alex being a traitor. Maddy and Amos tried to convince several other players that Wilf was a traitor. Aaron and Meryl remained unconvinced since Maddy was wrong about them and they were getting frustrated. Shield Misson: Split into three teams, two members of each team were buried in underground graves and it was up to the remaining team members to uncover them within 45 minutes. Each person who escaped their grave was worth £1,500 for the prize fund and the fastest team to uncover their two teammates would win a trip to the Armoury. The players banked £9000 with Aaron, Alex, Amanda, Hannah & Theo winning and being sent to the Armoury. Amanda got the shield. Meryl told Amos and Wilf she thought Maddy was clouding everyone’s judgement by continuously going after Wilf. Amos said though he didn’t think Maddy was right about everything she might be right one traitor. Wilf worried that with Kieran and Amos being less attached to the fellow players they were likely to be swayed by Maddy’s theory and as time went on more people would vote for him. Other players continued to suspect Alyssa. At the round table: Andrea accused Alyssa of being a traitor; Alyssa gave a very tactical accusation on Alex which was then seen as suspicious; Amos pointed out that Wilf seemed less paranoid compared to all the faithful and was caught off guard by how easily dismissed Maddy’s suggestions were; Theo pointed out how nervous Wilf looked as being suspicious; Wilf announced that they were constantly going for loud people and being wrong and stated he was going to vote for Alyssa catching both of his fellow traitors off guard. He accused her of acting and pointing fingers when she was accused; Alyssa told Maddy that Wilf had deflected it and was hurt that she had been backstabbed. Wilf knew that unless another traitor was found, he would never escape suspicion. In a very close vote, Wilf received 5 votes but Alyssa was banished with 6 with Amanda having the deciding vote. She believed Wilf was a stronger traitor over Alyssa and decided to save him. Alyssa revealed she was a traitor to the excitement and shock of the faithful. Amos and Kieran apologised to Wilf believing they had been wrong. On top of Alyssa’s reveal; Wilf’s evident relief at not being banished meant that though Maddy suggested Wilf could still be a traitor, no one was now willing to listen. Amanda was praised for the casting vote in getting rid of Alyssa. Though Maddy was still suspicious of Wilf, his name had seemingly been cleared for everyone else. In the turret, Amanda warned Wilf not to betray her in the future. Claudia entered and told them that since there were only two of them, instead of murdering they could instead recruit someone to join them. Wilf and Amanda decided to try and recruit Alex. However, she didn’t have to accept and the episode was left on a cliffhanger of her decision.
| 7 | 7 | "Episode 7" | 13 December 2022 | 3.76 |
Alex rejected the offer due to how emotional Alyssa had become when she revealed her identity thinking it would be too much pressure for her. This decision shocked the traitors. When everyone returned for breakfast, Amanda revealed she had the shield. The players wondered if they had tried to murder her and failed or if there had been a recruitment. Alex did not tell anyone about the recruitment fearing people wouldn’t believe that she declined it. Suspicion was put on Andrea though Amos said he would never vote for her. Maddy continued to believe that Aaron, Wilf and Meryl were traitors while Amanda put some suspicion on Maddy. Rayan worried he might be accused again. Alex told Amos about her attempted recruitment and asked his advice. He suggested she wait to bring it up at the round table. Shield Mission: As a group, the contestants had 90 minutes to transport whisky barrels to an old distillery on the top of a nearby hill. Along the way, they would find more barrels of increasing size worth more money, as well as five barrels, which would allow contestants of their choice to enter the Armoury. In addition to £8,400 worth of barrels, three of the five Armoury barrels crossed the finish line – and Andrea, Fay & Theo were chosen to enter the Armoury. Fay received the shield. Wilf suggested that since Amanda and Fay were unlikely to be banished, the traitors must have tried to murder Amanda the previous night. Fay questioned Rayan who was frustrated since he knew he would be under scrutiny again. At the round table; Alex told everyone about her recruitment with Amanda saying it was cheeky for the traitors to try and recruit her after everything Alex had been through. Wilf said it confirmed Alex was a faithful; Amos pointed out that Andrea had never been challenged at the table upsetting her since they were very close; Alex pointed out that Rayan and Maddy’s names had been brought up and wanted to hear what they had to say; Rayan said it was unfair that people said he hadn’t been speaking up or helping since he had been one of the first to mention Alyssa’s name and he had been making his own voting decisions and cases against the herd mentality of the group. Rayan was banished with 7 votes. The traitors met up and debated murdering Amos or Alex.
| 8 | 8 | "Episode 8" | 15 December 2022 (Note: This episode was originally scheduled for the night before, but was delayed due to coverage of the 2022 Qatar World Cup.) | 3.75 |
The traitors decided to murder Alex for rejecting their offer. Before this revelation, Maddy decided to be honest about her job and revealed to several players that she was an actress. Amanda immediately pounced on the information while she, Theo, and Meryl told the rest of the group. Many players wondered why she had kept quiet and if she could act she might be lying easily to them. Shield Mission: Set in a Claudia’s cabin, contestants were aplit into two teams and had to escape a Fishing-themed escape room. For each team who escaped, they would add £3,000 to the prize fund – and the fastest team to escape would be given the opportunity to enter the Armoury. Only the Green Team – Fay, Hannah, Kieran, Maddy, Meryl and Wilfred – escaped in the time limit banking £3000, and they entered the Armoury. Maddy received the shield. Claudia informed the players that instead of a round table they were all invited to a dinner party with a party game. Wilf and Amanda were secretly told that there we be no meeting in the turret and they would have to murder in plain sight by giving a ‘kiss-of-death’ to a player after dinner before midnight. Wilf considered murdering Andrea while Amanda struggled with the idea of taking her out of the game. At the dinner party, the players talked about how much they had enjoyed the experience and shared some personal stories. After hearing their stories, Wilf briefly reconsidered whether they should murder at all that night. Claudia entered to begin the party game. Starting with Amanda, players were asked who they trusted the most. After choosing, they would sit down, and the chosen player would then decide. In order: Amanda picked Theo; Theo picked Andrea; Andrea picked Amos; Amos picked Kieran; Kieran picked Wilf; Wilf picked Fay (over his three closest friends in the castle - Aaron, Meryl & Hannah to try and gain a new ally); Fay picked Aaron; Aaron picked Hannah; Hannah picked Meryl. This left Maddy as the last player standing. Claudia offered Maddy the £3000 earned in the mission and leave the game. Or add the money to the prize pot and continue. Most players thought she would take the money telling her she should. Maddy decided to remain in the game. Hannah was upset with Wilf for not choosing her since they had become good friends in the castle. Amanda and Wilf met up to discuss who to murder. The episode ended with Amanda confirming “the deal was sealed” with the audience left to wonder who was murdered.
| 9 | 9 | "Episode 9" | 16 December 2022 | 3.60 |
At breakfast, Kieran and Fay told Wilf they suspected Amanda. Theo trusted Amanda. It was revealed that Amos had been murdered which upset Andrea and Kieran in particular. Amanda had kissed Amos on the cheek as she left. Claudia revealed that he had been murdered in plain sight after dinner. Wilf and Hannah made up. Suspicions fell on several players with Maddy still suspecting Aaron and Wilf. Aaron called out Maddy for being an actor and that her ‘team player’ move could be suspicious. Andrea asked if she could think differently. Maddy said she couldn’t and said Aaron and Wilf hadn’t bothered to comfort Andrea or Kieran that morning (they had). To throw suspicion off of Wilf, Amanda said she had never questioned Theo. Wilf thought that be her abruptly turning on her ‘100%’ from the dinner party would make her seem suspicious. Shield Mission: Split into three teams, contestants would drive a route and encounter True or False statements. If they pick the incorrect answer, they would hit a dead end. Teams had 45 minutes to complete their route, and each team who completed the route would earn £2,000 for the prize fund. The fastest team to complete the route would also be given the opportunity to enter the Armoury, where one of them would win the Shield. Wilf was considered unlikely to cheat a lie detector test; Fay was voted most controlling. The Blue Team – Kieran, Meryl & Wilfred – were the first team back and won their tickets to the Armoury. The players banked £6000 and Meryl got the shield and told Wilf although Tom’s suggestion to not reveal who got it had been maintained since the first shield was introduced. Theo and Maddy thought that Aaron was a traitor, Theo’s theory was Amos had been killed because he was the player Aaron had the least connection with. Hannah trusted Aaron and pointed out that if people thought someone was a traitor then everything they did would become confirmation bias. Amanda continued to push suspicion on Theo saying she hadn’t really meant it when she picked him as 100% and he had been clinging to other players. Theo accused Aaron; Aaron pointed out Alyssa had fully trusted Theo and said that, like Alyssa, Theo’s energy had decreased suspecting that the weight of being a traitor was weighing him down; Hannah asked Maddy why she lied about the acting; Maddy accused Aaron believing she was being kept in because she was correct in her theory; frustrated, Aaron said that though he didn’t want to leave the game he wanted to be able to tell Maddy he was a faithful. Theo was banished with 6 votes and revealed he was faithful. Amanda voted for Theo surprising Hannah and Fay. Wilf became paranoid that if Amanda could throw Theo under the bus so quickly she could turn on him. In a confessional, he wondered if he should form a plan to banish her. The traitors debated between murdering Fay, Andrea, or Aaron.
| 10 | 10 | "Episode 10" | 20 December 2022 | 4.09 |
At breakfast, Maddy still suspected Wilf and Aaron. Meryl suspected Aaron and Fay and shared her theory with the group. However, it was revealed that Fay was the one who was murdered. Kieran told Hannah he suspected Amanda or Andrea. Aaron admitted to Amanda he had briefly suspected her while Wilf thought she would turn on him. Wilf told Meryl, Hannah, and Kieran he suspected Amanda because of how fast ahead had turned on Theo. Kieran thought her poker face was very good. The four formed a small voting alliance to potentially banish Amanda either that night or the next night. Shield Mission: The contestants were given twenty minutes to individually make their way through a room and steal artifacts which were protected by lasers. Each artifact was worth a set amount of money for the prize fund. Breaking a laser would cost the group one minute of time and any artifacts being carried would be lost. After all eight contestants have made an attempt, they are then given a second opportunity. On their first pass, only Wilfred (£2,000) and Aaron (£1,000) collected artifacts and on their second pass, Wilfred (£400) and Kieran (£300) collected artifacts. The players banked a total of £3,700. There was a shield among the artifacts which would keep them safe from murder, but no-one went for it. At the round table: Claudia told them all to look at each other and say “I am a Faithful” though pointed out the traitors would have lied; Kieran proposed a matriarch theory that either Andrea or Amanda was leading the traitors; Amanda suggested Hannah or Maddy because of the acting however Kieran shot this down; Wilf and Hannah questioned how Amanda had turned on Theo so quickly. Amanda was banished with 4 votes with Wilf voting for her. She revealed she was a traitor shocking the contestants. In the turret, Wilf did feel guilty for banishing Amanda. Claudia informed him that as the last traitor standing he would have to issue an ultimatum to another contestant. He would meet a player face to face and they would either join him as a traitor or immediately be murdered.
| 11 | 11 | "Episode 11" | 21 December 2022 | 4.32 |
Wilf decided to recruit Kieran who accepted the ultimatum and became a new traitor though he felt blindsided by the recruitment since he had been happy playing as a faithful. The traitors debated murdering Andrea, Maddy or Meryl. They decided to murder Andrea. Hannah theorised that since the previous two traitors had been women, there was probably a male traitor - either Aaron or Kieran. Wilf told Hannah he trusted her, Kieran, and Meryl. Maddy later told Aaron she no longer suspected him but still suspected Wilf. Hannah shot down the idea. Aaron decided to try and get three allies to vote for Kieran thinking that his takedown of Amanda showed he had insider knowledge. Hannah wondered if Kieran’s upset at Amos’ murder had been guilt. Wilf warned Kieran that a lot of contestants thought he was suspicious. Mission: Suspended over a rickety bridge above a river are bags with different values – ranging from £500 to £2,000. One at a time, blindfolded contestants will go out onto the bridge and be guided by their teammates to collect bags. They have eight minutes each to get their money across the bridge – anyone who falls is out, alongside their money. Only Meryl (£500), Maddy (£750) and Aaron (£2,000) got across the bridge – adding £3,250 to the prize fund. There was no shield on offer. In the car ride back, Wilf, Meryl, and Hannah decided to vote for Aaron. In the other car, Maddy told Kieran and Aaron that Meryl and Wilf had said their names. This caused Kieran to doubt his alliance with Wilf and he pushed the idea of him being a traitor to Aaron and Maddy. Maddy told Hannah and Meryl that they were going for Wilf which shocked them. Hannah warned Wilf wondering why Kieran was suddenly voting for him. Wilf (who had actually been defending Kieran) thought Kieran had turned on him. Kieran was still angry that his name had been mentioned and confronted Wilf. The players tried to clear up the confusion and believed that someone had been stirring the pot. Kieran still believed that Wilf would betray him to win alone and the pair got into an argument in the breakfast room. Aaron was annoyed by how everyone had turned on each other and warned Maddy that she looked suspicious. At the round table: Meryl was suggested as a traitor since she often followed the pack with her votes or her theories were wrong. Aaron asked her why she approached Maddy with only Aaron and Kieran as vote options; Hannah and Wilf asked why Maddy was challenging Meryl when she also had been certain on Aaron and Wilf. Wilf accused Maddy of having a tunnel vision. Hannah and Meryl expressed their frustrations with Maddy and believed she was trying to make Meryl look guilty. Maddy was banished with 4 votes and revealed she was a faithful. Claudia announced that there was no murder that night and they would all enter the final m. She also revealed that the players would decide when the game ended. With no murder, Wilf and Kieran did not meet in the turret and, having seen Kieran’s reactions that day, Wilf decided banishing Kieran would serve his endgame better.
| 12 | 12 | "Episode 12" | 22 December 2022 | 4.73 |
The final five met at breakfast. Kieran suggested Aaron and Meryl were likely the traitors to Hannah and Wilf. Wilf debated between winning with Kieran or betraying him as he was worried Kieran would out him. Aaron and Meryl were suspicious of Kieran. Final Mission: Dotted around Loch Glass are moneybags totalling £20,000. The two strongest swimmers – Aaron & Hannah – had to jump out of a helicopter to swim to a pair of buoys to get the combination to find speedboat keys and a map in a box. The remaining three then had to collect the swimmers before they used the speedboat to find the moneybags in four separate locations over the ten miles of coastline within 30 minutes. They banked the full £20,000 so the final prize pot was £101,050. Wilf, Hannah, and Meryl agreed that Aaron probably wasn’t a traitor and agreed not to banish each other to increase their own shares. Kieran recognised the numbers were against him and hoped Wilf would work with. Wilf told Kieran he would vote for Meryl who asked if Hannah would join their vote. Wilf went to the faithfuls and told them that Kieran was voting for Meryl. Hannah told Kieran she wasn’t sure who to vote for yet and he realised that he was likely going to be backstabbed and banished since Wilf was close friends with all three remaining faithful. At the round table: Hannah accused Kieran and he told her that he hoped she was one of the ones at the end. Meryl and Aaron also accused Kieran with him cryptically replying that someone was playing a very good game and they would find out very soon. His crypticness confused the faithful contestants and Kieran asked Claudia to end discussion early and get down to voting. All three faithful and Wilf voted for Kieran. Kieran told them he was giving them “a parting gift” and voted for Wilf before revealing he was a traitor since he wanted the faithful players to win over Wilf. Claudia informed them that they would soon enter endgame to decide whether they thought all traitors had been banished. Kieran’s ‘parting gift’ immediately caused Aaron and Hannah to suspect Wilf who tried to convince them he was a faithful. He emotionally told them that if they voted him out he wasn’t sure if he’d speak to them again. Hannah thought that this ultimatum was unlike Wilf and she didn’t know what to do. The contestants met at the fire pit. Players would first pick pouches that would be thrown in the fire and signal whether they wanted to end the game or banish again - green for end game, red for banish again. If just one player voted to banish again then another vote would be had with no discussion. Wilf and Meryl voted to end the game. Hannah and Aaron voted to banish again. Wilf voted for Aaron. Hannah, Aaron, and Meryl voted for Wilf. Wilf was banished and revealed he was a traitor to the shock and disbelief of the other three. He congratulated the other three and explained he had kept them in as his friends. Aaron, Meryl, and Hannah voted to end the game and became the first winners of the UK series splitting the prize pot and each receiving £33,683 each.

== Ratings ==
Weekly ratings for each show on BBC One. All ratings are provided by BARB.

| Episode | Date | Official rating (millions) | Weekly rank for BBC One | Weekly rank for all UK TV |
|---|---|---|---|---|
| Episode 1 | 29 November | 3.88 | 14 | 25 |
| Episode 2 | 30 November | 3.14 | 25 | 38 |
| Episode 3 | 1 December | <2.71 | —N/a | —N/a |
| Episode 4 | 6 December | 3.33 | 21 | 37 |
| Episode 5 | 7 December | 3.13 | 24 | 45 |
| Episode 6 | 8 December | 3.37 | 20 | 36 |
| Episode 7 | 13 December | 3.76 | 21 | 29 |
| Episode 8 | 15 December | 3.75 | 22 | 30 |
| Episode 9 | 16 December | 3.60 | 23 | 33 |
| Episode 10 | 20 December | 4.09 | 18 | 30 |
| Episode 11 | 21 December | 4.32 | 16 | 25 |
| Episode 12 | 22 December | 4.73 | 12 | 15 |
| Series average | 2022 | 3.74 (Note: This figure does not include Episode 3 as no viewing figure is available for that episode because it did not rank within the top 50 programmes of the week.) | —N/a | —N/a |

== See also ==
- The Traitors UK
