= List of Love Island USA episodes =

Love Island USA is an American dating reality show based on the British series of the same name.

As of June 29, 2026, 269 episodes of Love Island USA have aired. In February 2022, the series was picked up for its fourth and fifth seasons by Peacock. The sixth season premiered on June 11, 2024, while the seventh season premiered on June 3, 2025.

== Series overview ==
Season	Islanders	Days	Location	Host	Episodes	Originally released			Winners	Runners-up
Season	Islanders	Days	Location	Host	Episodes	First released	Last released	Network	Winners	Runners-up
1	25	30	Fiji	Arielle Vandenberg	22	July 9, 2019	August 7, 2019	CBS	Elizabeth Weber & Zac Mirabelli	Alexandra Stewart & Dylan Curry
2	31	40	Las Vegas, Nevada	Arielle Vandenberg	34	August 24, 2020	September 30, 2020	CBS	Caleb Corprew & Justine Ndiba	Cely Vazquez & Johnny Middlebrooks
3	34	40	Nīnole, Hawaii	Arielle Vandenberg	29	July 7, 2021	August 15, 2021	CBS	Korey Gandy & Olivia Kaiser	Kyra Lizama & Will Moncada
4	34	32	Santa Barbara, California	Sarah Hyland	38	July 19, 2022	September 1, 2022	Peacock	Timmy Pandolfi & Zeta Morrison	Isaiah Campbell & Sydney Paight
5	33	32	Viseisei, Fiji	Sarah Hyland	37	July 18, 2023	August 27, 2023	Peacock	Hannah Wright & Marco Donatelli	Kassy Castillo & Leonardo Dionicio
6	33	32	Viseisei, Fiji	Ariana Madix	37	June 11, 2024	August 19, 2024	Peacock	Kordell Beckham & Serena Page	Leah Kateb & Miguel Harichi
7	30	32	Viseisei, Fiji	Ariana Madix	37	June 3, 2025	August 25, 2025	Peacock	Amaya Espinal & Bryan Arenales	Nicolas Vansteenberghe & Olandria Carthen
8	34	32	Viseisei, Fiji	Ariana Madix	36	June 2, 2026	August 31, 2026	Peacock	Bryce Alakai & Trinity Tatum	Aniya Harvey & Carl Lee Schmidt

== Episodes ==
=== Season 1 (2019) ===
The series was announced and commissioned on August 8, 2018, by CBS. It premiered on July 9, 2019, on CBS.

No. overall	No. in season	Title	Day(s)	Original release date	Prod. code	US viewers (millions)	Rating/share (18–49)
Week 1
1	1	"Episode 1"	Days 1–2	July 9, 2019	101	2.61	0.6/3
2	2	"Episode 2"	Days 2–3	July 10, 2019	102	2.59	0.6/4
3	3	"Episode 3"	Days 3–5	July 11, 2019	103	2.51	0.6/4
4	4	"Episode 4"	Days 5–6	July 12, 2019	104	2.03	0.4/3
Week 2
5	5	"Episode 5"	Days 6–9	July 15, 2019	105	1.98	0.5/3
6	6	"Episode 6"	Days 9–10	July 16, 2019	106	2.25	0.5/3
7	7	"Episode 7"	Days 10–11	July 17, 2019	107	2.40	0.5/3
8	8	"Episode 8"	Days 11–12	July 18, 2019	108	2.25	0.5/3
9	9	"Episode 9"	Day 12–13	July 19, 2019	109	2.16	0.5/4
Week 3
10	10	"Episode 10"	Days 13–15	July 22, 2019	110	1.88	0.4/3
11	11	"Episode 11"	Day 15	July 23, 2019	111	2.14	0.4/3
12	12	"Episode 12"	Days 15–18	July 24, 2019	112	2.24	0.5/3
13	13	"Episode 13"	Day 18	July 25, 2019	113	2.18	0.5/3
14	14	"Episode 14"	Days 18–20	July 26, 2019	114	1.97	0.3/3
Week 4
15	15	"Episode 15"	Days 20–22	July 29, 2019	115	2.05	0.4/2
16	16	"Episode 16"	Days 22–24	July 30, 2019	116	1.91	0.4/2
17	17	"Episode 17"	Days 23–24	July 31, 2019	117	2.38	0.5/3
18	18	"Episode 18"	Days 24–25	August 1, 2019	118	2.26	0.5/3
19	19	"Episode 19"	Days 25–27	August 2, 2019	119	1.92	0.3/3
Week 5
20	20	"Episode 20"	Days 27–28	August 5, 2019	120	2.00	0.4/2
21	21	"Episode 21"	Days 28–29	August 6, 2019	121	1.95	0.4/3
22	22	"Episode 22"	Day 30	August 7, 2019	122	2.54	0.5/3

=== Season 2 (2020) ===
On August 1, 2019, the show was renewed for a second season and was originally scheduled to premiere on May 21, 2020. However, due to the ongoing COVID-19 pandemic in the United States, the production was postponed. The second season production moved to The Cromwell Las Vegas with strict quarantine measures in place. It premiered on August 24, 2020.

No. overall	No. in season	Title	Day(s)	Original release date	Prod. code	US viewers (millions)	Rating (18–49)
Week 1
23	1	"Episode 1"	Days 1–2	August 24, 2020	201	1.89	0.4
24	2	"Episode 2"	Days 2–3	August 25, 2020	202	1.48	
25	3	"Episode 3"	Days 4–5	August 27, 2020	203	1.47	0.4
26	4	"Episode 4"	Days 5–6	August 28, 2020	204	1.47	0.3
27	5	"Episode 5"	Days 6–7	August 29, 2020	205	0.70	0.1
Week 2
28	6	"Episode 6"	Days 7–8	August 30, 2020	206	1.39	0.2
29	7	"Episode 7"	Days 8–9	August 31, 2020	207	1.58	0.3
30	8	"Episode 8"	Days 9–10	September 1, 2020	208	1.70	0.4
31	9	"Episode 9"	Days 10–11	September 3, 2020	209	1.56	0.4
32	10	"Episode 10"	Days 11–12	September 4, 2020	210	1.58	0.3
33	11	"Episode 11"	Days 12–13	September 5, 2020	211	0.70	0.1
Week 3
34	12	"Episode 12"	Days 13–14	September 6, 2020	212	1.61	0.4
35	13	"Episode 13"	Days 14–15	September 7, 2020	213	1.63	0.3
36	14	"Episode 14"	Day 16	September 8, 2020	214	1.69	0.4
37	15	"Episode 15"	Days 16–17	September 9, 2020	215	1.66	0.4
38	16	"Episode 16"	Days 17–18	September 10, 2020	216	1.66	0.4
39	17	"Episode 17"	Days 18–19	September 11, 2020	217	1.81	0.5
40	18	"Episode 18"	Day 19	September 12, 2020	218	0.81	0.1
Week 4
41	19	"Episode 19"	Days 19–20	September 13, 2020	219	1.77	0.5
42	20	"Episode 20"	Days 21–22	September 14, 2020	220	1.66	0.4
43	21	"Episode 21"	Days 22–23	September 15, 2020	221	1.92	0.5
44	22	"Episode 22"	Days 23–26	September 17, 2020	222	1.78	0.4
45	23	"Episode 23"	Days 26–27	September 18, 2020	223	1.58	0.3
46	24	"Episode 24"	Day 27	September 19, 2020	224	0.90	0.1
Week 5
47	25	"Episode 25"	Days 27–29	September 20, 2020	225	1.91	0.5
48	26	"Episode 26"	Days 29–30	September 21, 2020	226	1.82	0.5
49	27	"Episode 27"	Days 30–31	September 22, 2020	227	1.85	0.5
50	28	"Episode 28"	Days 31–32	September 23, 2020	228	1.86	0.6
51	29	"Episode 29"	Days 32–33	September 24, 2020	229	1.87	0.7
52	30	"Episode 30"	Days 33–35	September 25, 2020	230	1.85	0.4
Week 6
53	31	"Episode 31"	Day 36	September 27, 2020	231	1.71	0.4
54	32	"Episode 32"	Days 36–37	September 28, 2020	232	1.77	0.4
55	33	"Episode 33"	Days 37–38	September 29, 2020	233	2.48	0.6
56	34	"Episode 34"	Day 38	September 30, 2020	234	2.03	0.5

=== Season 3 (2021) ===
On January 27, 2021, the series was renewed for a third season which was filmed in Hawaii. On May 13, 2021, it was announced that the third season would premiere on July 7, 2021.

No. overall	No. in season	Title	Day(s)	Original release date	Prod. code	US viewers (millions)	Rating (18–49)
Week 1
57	1	"Episode 1"	Day 1	July 7, 2021	301	1.86	0.5
58	2	"Episode 2"	Days 1–2	July 8, 2021	302	1.71	0.4
59	3	"Episode 3"	Days 2–3	July 9, 2021	303	1.53	0.3
60	4	"Episode 4"	Days 3–5	July 11, 2021	304	1.38	0.3
Week 2
61	5	"Episode 5"	Days 5–7	July 13, 2021	305	1.72	0.3
62	6	"Episode 6"	Days 7–8	July 14, 2021	306	1.69	0.3
63	7	"Episode 7"	Days 8–9	July 15, 2021	307	1.71	0.4
64	8	"Episode 8"	Days 9–11	July 16, 2021	308	1.66	0.3
65	9	"Episode 9"	Days 11–13	July 18, 2021	309	1.47	0.4
Week 3
66	10	"Episode 10"	Days 13–15	July 20, 2021	310	1.66	0.3
67	11	"Episode 11"	Days 15–16	July 21, 2021	311	1.64	0.4
68	12	"Episode 12"	Days 16–17	July 22, 2021	312	1.86	0.4
69	13	"Episode 13"	Days 17–18	July 23, 2021	313	1.47	0.3
Week 4
70	14	"Episode 14"	Days 18–19	July 25, 2021	314	1.34	0.3
71	15	"Episode 15"	Days 20–21	July 27, 2021	315	1.66	0.4
72	16	"Episode 16"	Days 21–22	July 28, 2021	316	1.89	0.5
73	17	"Episode 17"	Days 22–24	July 29, 2021	317	1.78	0.4
74	18	"Episode 18"	Day 24	July 30, 2021	318	1.54	0.3
Week 5
75	19	"Episode 19"	Days 24–26	August 1, 2021	319	1.57	0.4
76	20	"Episode 20"	Days 26–27	August 3, 2021	320	1.82	0.4
77	21	"Episode 21"	Days 27–29	August 4, 2021	321	1.72	0.4
78	22	"Episode 22"	Days 30–31	August 5, 2021	322	1.78	0.4
79	23	"Episode 23"	Days 31–32	August 6, 2021	323	1.60	0.3
Week 6
80	24	"Episode 24"	Days 32–34	August 8, 2021	324	1.67	0.4
81	25	"Episode 25"	Day 35	August 10, 2021	325	1.66	0.3
82	26	"Episode 26"	Day 36	August 11, 2021	326	1.73	0.4
83	27	"Episode 27"	Days 36–38	August 12, 2021	327	1.86	0.4
84	28	"Episode 28"	Day 39	August 13, 2021	328	1.43	0.3
85	29	"Episode 29"	Day 40	August 15, 2021	329	1.64	0.4

=== Season 4 (2022) ===
No. overall	No. in season	Title	Day(s)	Original release date	Prod. code
Week 1
86	1	"Episode 1"	Day 1	July 19, 2022	401
87	2	"Episode 2"	Days 1–2	July 20, 2022	402
88	3	"Episode 3"	Days 2–3	July 21, 2022	403
89	4	"Episode 4"	Days 3–4	July 22, 2022	404
90	5	"Episode 5: Week 1 Recap"	N/A (Note: This episode showcased events from the previous days in the week. No new or present days were featured.)	July 23, 2022	405
91	6	"Episode 6"	Days 4–5	July 24, 2022	406
92	7	"Episode 7"	Days 5–6	July 26, 2022	407
93	8	"Episode 8"	Days 6–7	July 27, 2022	408
Week 2
94	9	"Episode 9"	Days 7–8	July 28, 2022	409
95	10	"Episode 10"	Days 8–9	July 29, 2022	410
96	11	"Episode 11: Unseen Bits"	N/A	July 30, 2022	411
97	12	"Episode 12"	Days 9–10	July 31, 2022	412
98	13	"Episode 13"	Days 10–11	August 2, 2022	413
99	14	"Episode 14"	Days 11–12	August 3, 2022	414
100	15	"Episode 15"	Days 12–13	August 4, 2022	415
101	16	"Episode 16"	Days 13–14	August 5, 2022	416
Week 3
102	17	"Episode 17: Unseen Bits"	N/A	August 6, 2022	417
103	18	"Episode 18"	Days 14–15	August 7, 2022	418
104	19	"Episode 19"	Days 15–16	August 8, 2022	419
105	20	"Episode 20"	Days 16–17	August 9, 2022	420
106	21	"Episode 21"	Days 17–18	August 10, 2022	421
107	22	"Episode 22"	Days 18–19	August 11, 2022	422
108	23	"Episode 23"	Days 19–20	August 12, 2022	423
109	24	"Episode 24: Unseen Bits"	N/A	August 13, 2022	424
110	25	"Episode 25"	Days 20–21	August 14, 2022	425
Week 4
111	26	"Episode 26"	Days 21–22	August 16, 2022	426
112	27	"Episode 27"	Days 22–23	August 17, 2022	427
113	28	"Episode 28"	Days 23–24	August 18, 2022	428
114	29	"Episode 29"	Days 24–25	August 19, 2022	429
115	30	"Episode 30: Unseen Bits"	N/A	August 20, 2022	430
116	31	"Episode 31"	Days 25–26	August 21, 2022	431
117	32	"Episode 32"	Days 26–27	August 23, 2022	432
118	33	"Episode 33"	Days 27–28	August 24, 2022	433
Week 5
119	34	"Episode 34"	Days 28–29	August 25, 2022	434
120	35	"Episode 35"	Days 30–31	August 26, 2022	435
121	36	"Episode 36: Unseen Bits"	N/A	August 27, 2022	436
122	37	"Episode 37"	Days 31–32	August 28, 2022	437
123	38	"Episode 38: Reunion"	N/A	September 1, 2022	438

=== Season 5 (2023) ===
No. overall	No. in season	Title	Day(s)	Original release date	Prod. code
Week 1
124	1	"Episode 1"	Day 1	July 18, 2023	501
125	2	"Episode 2"	Days 1–2	July 19, 2023	502
126	3	"Episode 3"	Days 2–3	July 20, 2023	503
127	4	"Episode 4"	Days 3–4	July 21, 2023	504
128	5	"Episode 5: Unseen Bits"	N/A (Note: This episode showcased events from the previous days in the week. No new or present days were featured.)	July 22, 2023	505
129	6	"Episode 6"	Days 4–5	July 23, 2023	506
130	7	"Episode 7"	Days 5–6	July 24, 2023	507
131	8	"Episode 8"	Days 6–7	July 25, 2023	508
Week 2
132	9	"Episode 9"	Days 7–8	July 27, 2023	509
133	10	"Episode 10"	Days 8–9	July 28, 2023	510
134	11	"Episode 11: Unseen Bits"	N/A	July 29, 2023	511
135	12	"Episode 12"	Days 9–10	July 30, 2023	512
136	13	"Episode 13"	Days 10–11	July 31, 2023	513
137	14	"Episode 14"	Days 11–12	August 1, 2023	514
138	15	"Episode 15"	Days 12–13	August 3, 2023	515
139	16	"Episode 16"	Days 13–14	August 4, 2023	516
140	17	"Episode 17: Unseen Bits"	N/A	August 5, 2023	517
Week 3
141	18	"Episode 18"	Days 14–15	August 6, 2023	518
142	19	"Episode 19"	Days 15–16	August 7, 2023	519
143	20	"Episode 20"	Days 16–17	August 8, 2023	520
144	21	"Episode 21"	Days 17–18	August 9, 2023	521
145	22	"Episode 22"	Days 18–19	August 10, 2023	522
146	23	"Episode 23"	Days 19–20	August 11, 2023	523
147	24	"Episode 24: Unseen Bits"	N/A	August 12, 2023	524
148	25	"Episode 25"	Days 20–21	August 13, 2023	525
Week 4
149	26	"Episode 26"	Days 21–22	August 14, 2023	526
150	27	"Episode 27"	Days 22–23	August 15, 2023	527
151	28	"Episode 28"	Days 23–24	August 17, 2023	528
152	29	"Episode 29"	Days 24–25	August 18, 2023	529
153	30	"Episode 30: Unseen Bits"	N/A	August 19, 2023	530
154	31	"Episode 31"	Days 25–26	August 20, 2023	531
155	32	"Episode 32"	Days 26–27	August 21, 2023	532
156	33	"Episode 33"	Days 27–28	August 22, 2023	533
Week 5
157	34	"Episode 34"	Days 28–29	August 24, 2023	534
158	35	"Episode 35"	Days 29–30	August 25, 2023	535
159	36	"Episode 36: Unseen Bits"	N/A	August 26, 2023	536
160	37	"Episode 37"	Days 30–32	August 27, 2023	537

=== Season 6 (2024) ===
No. overall	No. in season	Title	Day(s)	Original release date	Prod. code
Week 1
161	1	"Episode 1"	Days 1–2	June 11, 2024	601
162	2	"Episode 2"	Days 2–3	June 12, 2024	602
163	3	"Episode 3"	Days 3–4	June 13, 2024	603
164	4	"Episode 4"	Days 4–5	June 14, 2024	604
165	5	"Episode 5: Aftersun"	N/A (Note: This episode showcased events from the previous days in the week. No new or present days were featured.)	June 15, 2024	605
166	6	"Episode 6"	Days 5–6	June 16, 2024	606
167	7	"Episode 7"	Days 6–7	June 17, 2024	607
Week 2
168	8	"Episode 8"	Days 7–8	June 18, 2024	608
169	9	"Episode 9"	Days 8–9	June 20, 2024	609
170	10	"Episode 10"	Days 9–10	June 21, 2024	610
171	11	"Episode 11: Aftersun"	N/A	June 22, 2024	611
172	12	"Episode 12"	Days 10–11	June 23, 2024	612
173	13	"Episode 13"	Days 11–12	June 24, 2024	613
174	14	"Episode 14"	Days 12–13	June 25, 2024	614
175	15	"Episode 15"	Days 13–14	June 27, 2024	615
Week 3
176	16	"Episode 16"	Days 14–15	June 28, 2024	616
177	17	"Episode 17: Aftersun"	N/A	June 29, 2024	617
178	18	"Episode 18"	Days 15–16	June 30, 2024	618
179	19	"Episode 19"	Days 16–17	July 1, 2024	619
180	20	"Episode 20"	Days 17–18	July 2, 2024	620
181	21	"Episode 21"	Days 18–19	July 4, 2024	621
182	22	"Episode 22"	Days 19–20	July 5, 2024	622
183	23	"Episode 23: Aftersun"	N/A	July 6, 2024	623
184	24	"Episode 24"	Days 20–21	July 7, 2024	624
Week 4
185	25	"Episode 25"	Days 21–22	July 8, 2024	625
186	26	"Episode 26"	Days 22–23	July 9, 2024	626
187	27	"Episode 27"	Days 23–24	July 11, 2024	627
188	28	"Episode 28"	Days 24–25	July 12, 2024	628
189	29	"Episode 29: Aftersun"	N/A	July 13, 2024	629
190	30	"Episode 30"	Days 25–26	July 14, 2024	630
191	31	"Episode 31"	Days 26–27	July 15, 2024	631
192	32	"Episode 32"	Days 27–28	July 16, 2024	632
Week 5
193	33	"Episode 33"	Days 28–29	July 18, 2024	633
194	34	"Episode 34"	Days 29–30	July 19, 2024	634
195	35	"Episode 35: Aftersun"	N/A	July 20, 2024	635
196	36	"Episode 36"	Days 30–32	July 21, 2024	636
Special
197	37	"Episode 37: Reunion"	N/A	August 19, 2024	637

=== Season 7 (2025) ===
No. overall	No. in season	Title	Day(s)	Original release date	Prod. code
Week 1
198	1	"Episode 1"	Days 1–2	June 3, 2025	701
199	2	"Episode 2"	Days 2–3	June 4, 2025	702
200	3	"Episode 3"	Days 3–4	June 5, 2025	703
201	4	"Episode 4"	Days 4–5	June 6, 2025	704
202	5	"Episode 5: Aftersun"	N/A (Note: This episode showcased events from the previous days in the week. No new or present days were featured.)	June 7, 2025	705
203	6	"Episode 6"	Days 5–6	June 8, 2025	706
204	7	"Episode 7"	Days 6–7	June 9, 2025	707
Week 2
205	8	"Episode 8"	Days 7–8	June 10, 2025	708
206	9	"Episode 9"	Days 8–9	June 12, 2025	709
207	10	"Episode 10"	Days 9–10	June 13, 2025	710
208	11	"Episode 11: Aftersun"	N/A	June 14, 2025	711
209	12	"Episode 12"	Days 10–11	June 15, 2025	712
210	13	"Episode 13"	Days 11–12	June 16, 2025	713
211	14	"Episode 14"	Days 12–13	June 17, 2025	714
212	15	"Episode 15"	Days 13–14	June 19, 2025	715
Week 3
213	16	"Episode 16"	Days 14–15	June 20, 2025	716
214	17	"Episode 17: Aftersun"	N/A	June 21, 2025	717
215	18	"Episode 18"	Days 15–16	June 22, 2025	718
216	19	"Episode 19"	Days 16–17	June 23, 2025	719
217	20	"Episode 20"	Days 17–18	June 24, 2025	720
218	21	"Episode 21"	Days 18–19	June 26, 2025	721
219	22	"Episode 22"	Days 19–20	June 27, 2025	722
220	23	"Episode 23: Aftersun"	N/A	June 28, 2025	723
221	24	"Episode 24"	Days 20–21	June 29, 2025	724
Week 4
222	25	"Episode 25"	Days 21–22	June 30, 2025	725
223	26	"Episode 26"	Days 22–23	July 1, 2025	726
224	27	"Episode 27"	Days 23–24	July 3, 2025	727
225	28	"Episode 28"	Days 24–25	July 4, 2025	728
226	29	"Episode 29: Aftersun"	N/A	July 5, 2025	729
227	30	"Episode 30"	Days 25–26	July 6, 2025	730
228	31	"Episode 31"	Days 26–27	July 7, 2025	731
229	32	"Episode 32"	Days 27–28	July 8, 2025	732
Week 5
230	33	"Episode 33"	Days 28–29	July 10, 2025	733
231	34	"Episode 34"	Days 29–30	July 11, 2025	734
232	35	"Episode 35: Aftersun"	N/A	July 12, 2025	735
233	36	"Episode 36"	Days 30–32	July 13, 2025	736
Special
234	37	"Episode 37: Reunion"	N/A	August 25, 2025	737

=== Season 8 (2026) ===
No. overall	No. in season	Title	Day(s)	Original release date	Prod. code
Week 1
235	1	"Episode 1"	Days 1–2	June 2, 2026	801
236	2	"Episode 2"	Days 2–3	June 3, 2026	802
237	3	"Episode 3"	Days 3–4	June 4, 2026	803
238	4	"Episode 4"	Days 4–5	June 5, 2026	804
239	5	"Episode 5"	Days 5–6	June 7, 2026	805
240	6	"Episode 6"	Days 6–7	June 8, 2026	806
Week 2
241	7	"Episode 7"	Days 7–8	June 9, 2026	807
242	8	"Episode 8"	Days 8–9	June 11, 2026	808
243	9	"Episode 9"	Days 9–10	June 12, 2026	809
244	10	"Episode 10: Aftersun"	N/A (Note: This episode showcased events from the previous days in the week. No new or present days were featured.)	June 13, 2026	810
245	11	"Episode 11"	Days 10–11	June 14, 2026	811
246	12	"Episode 12"	Days 11–12	June 15, 2026	812
246	13	"Episode 13"	Days 12–13	June 16, 2026	813
247	14	"Episode 14"	Days 13–14	June 18, 2026	814
Week 3
248	15	"Episode 15"	Days 14–15	June 19, 2026	815
249	16	"Episode 16: Aftersun"	N/A	June 20, 2026	816
250	17	"Episode 17"	Days 15–16	June 21, 2026	817
251	18	"Episode 18"	Days 16–17	June 22, 2026	818
252	19	"Episode 19"	Days 17–18	June 23, 2026	819
253	20	"Episode 20"	Days 18–19	June 25, 2026	820
254	21	"Episode 21"	Days 19–20	June 26, 2026	821
255	22	"Episode 22: Aftersun"	N/A	June 27, 2026	822
256	23	"Episode 23"	Days 20–21	June 28, 2026	823
Week 4
257	24	"Episode 24"	Days 21–22	June 29, 2026	824
258	25	"Episode 25"	Days 22–23	June 30, 2026	825
259	26	"Episode 26"	Days 23–24	July 2, 2026	826
260	27	"Episode 27"	Days 24–25	July 3, 2026	827
261	28	"Episode 28: Aftersun"	N/A	July 4, 2026	828
262	29	"Episode 29"	Days 25–26	July 5, 2026	829
263	30	"Episode 30"	Days 26–27	July 6, 2026	830
264	31	"Episode 31"	Days 27–28	July 7, 2026	831
Week 5
265	32	"Episode 32"	Days 28–29	July 9, 2026	832
266	33	"Episode 33"	Days 29–30	July 10, 2026	833
267	34	"Episode 34: Aftersun"	N/A	July 11, 2026	834
268	35	"Episode 35"	Days 30–32	July 12, 2026	835
Special
269	36	"Episode 36: Reunion"	N/A	August 31, 2026	836

== Ratings ==
Love Island : U.S. viewers per episode (millions)

Season	Episode number																																		Average
Season	1	2	3	4	5	6	7	8	9	10	11	12	13	14	15	16	17	18	19	20	21	22	23	24	25	26	27	28	29	30	31	32	33	34	Average
1	2.61	2.59	2.51	2.03	1.98	2.25	2.40	2.25	2.16	1.88	2.14	2.24	2.18	1.97	2.05	1.91	2.38	2.26	1.92	2.00	1.95	2.54	–												4.58
2	1.89	1.48	1.47	1.47	0.70	1.39	1.58	1.70	1.56	1.58	0.70	1.61	1.63	1.69	1.66	1.66	1.81	0.81	1.78	1.66	1.92	1.77	1.58	0.90	1.91	1.82	1.85	1.86	1.87	1.85	1.71	1.77	2.48	2.03	5.32
3	1.86	1.71	1.53	1.38	1.72	1.69	1.71	1.66	1.64	1.86	1.47	1.81	1.41	1.36	1.63	1.83	1.71	1.44	1.53	1.80	1.70	1.73	1.54	1.66	1.65	1.69	1.86	1.81	1.61	–					4.64

Audience measurement performed by Nielsen Media Research
