= Love Island: Beyond the Villa =

- Promotional poster
- Genre: Reality television
- Starring: Love Island USA contestants
- Country of origin: United States
- Original language: English
- No. of seasons: 2
- No. of episodes: 16

Production
- Executive producers: Richard Bye; Chet Fenster; Richard Foster; David George; Sarah Howell; Adam Sher
- Running time: 43–55 minutes
- Production company: ITV Entertainment

Original release
- Network: Peacock
- Release: July 13, 2025 – present

Related
- Love Island USA

Love Island: Beyond the Villa is an American reality television series that premiered on Peacock on July 13, 2025. The series is a spinoff show of Love Island USA. Season one of the series followed the lives of the Love Island USA season 6 contestants while the second season followed the cast of Love Island USA season 7. The show featured the contestants living their lives as they deal with new careers, changing friendships, and sudden fame.

== Production ==
In April 2025, it was announced that Peacock greenlit a new spinoff consisting of the season 6 islanders. The show premiered on July 13, 2025, and followed the islanders as they chase their dreams, explore new relationships, and face the realities of fame, without the villa walls. The cast included JaNa Craig, Aaron Evans, Miguel Harichi, Leah Kateb, Kaylor Martin, Connor Newsum, Serena Page, Kenny Rodriguez, Olivia Walker, and Kendall Washington with other former islanders making appearances.

In November 2025, the spinoff was renewed for a second season, this time consisting of the season 7 islanders. The show began production in late 2025.

In July 2026, following the season 8 finale, the show was renewed for a third season.

== Series overview ==
Season	Episodes	Originally released	
Season	Episodes	First released	Last released
1	8	July 13, 2025	August 28, 2025
2	8	April 15, 2026	May 6, 2026

== Season 1 ==
Promotional photo with the cast of season one.

The cast of season 1 was announced on April 17, 2025, with cast members from the sixth season of Love Island USA.

=== Main ===
- JaNa Craig
- Aaron Evans
- Miguel Harichi
- Leah Kateb
- Kaylor Martin
- Connor Newsum
- Serena Page
- Kenny Rodriguez
- Olivia Walker
- Kendall Washington

=== Recurring ===
- Kordell Beckham
- Torin Dunn
- Taylor Washington

=== Guest ===
- Courtney Boerner
- Katherine Gibson
- Kyra Green
- Nicole Jacky
- Emma Kenney
- Cassidy Laudano
- Harrison Luna
- Ariana Madix
- Megan Thee Stallion
- Sydney Paight
- Kierstan Saulter
- Cely Vazquez

=== Episodes ===
No. overall	No. in season	Title	Original release date
1	1	"You're So Last Summer"	July 13, 2025
2	2	"Porta-Potty Hottie"	July 17, 2025
3	3	"Under the Influence(r)"	July 24, 2025
4	4	"My Man, My Man, My Man -- Is Leaving!"	July 31, 2025
5	5	"Back in the Saddle, Baby!"	August 7, 2025
6	6	"A Bombshell Has Entered Los Angeles"	August 14, 2025
7	7	"Yatchty-atchty-atchty"	August 21, 2025
8	8	"Soul Tied with All the Feels"	August 28, 2025

== Season 2 ==
Promotional photo with the cast of season two.

The cast of season 2 was announced on November 7, 2025, with cast members from the seventh season of Love Island USA.

=== Main ===
- Bryan Arenales
- Gracyn Blackmore
- Jeremiah Brown
- Clarke Carraway
- Amaya Espinal
- Hannah Fields
- Jose "Pepe" Garcia-Gonzalez
- Iris Kendall
- TJ Palma
- Andreina Santos
- Chris Seeley
- Isabelle "Belle-A" Walker
- Courtney "CoCo" Watson
- Taylor Williams

=== Recurring ===
- Charlie Georgiou
- Kaylor Martin
- Sebastian Salcido

=== Guest ===
- Austin "AusGod" Ermes
- Jordan Carraway
- Johnny Middlebrooks
- Anthony Palma
- Lorraine Daniele Palma
- Steven Palma
- Austin Shepard
- Nicolas "Nic" Vansteenberghe

=== Episodes ===
No. overall	No. in season	Title	Original release date
9	1	"Exes and Woes"	April 15, 2026
10	2	"Friends-Not-Foes-giving"	April 15, 2026
11	3	"Bye Bye Bryan, Hello New York"	April 22, 2026
12	4	"The British Are Coming... to Palm Springs"	April 22, 2026
13	5	"Merry Ex-Mas"	April 29, 2026
14	6	"Oklahoma Club Flub"	April 29, 2026
15	7	"Ice-olated Islanders"	May 6, 2026
16	8	"The Can't-Be-Friends Zone"	May 6, 2026
