= List of Love Island USA contestants =

The following is a list of contestants that have appeared on the CBS and Peacock reality series Love Island USA. The youngest Islander is Marli Tyndall, who was 20 years old when she participated in the first season, whereas the oldest Islander is Felipe Gomes who was 32 when he entered season four.

The youngest winners are Zac Mirabelli, Marco Donatelli, and Kordell Beckham who were all 22 years old when they won the first, fifth and sixth seasons, respectively, and Trinity Tatum, who was 22 years old when she won the eighth season. The oldest winners are Bryce Alakai Dettloff, who was 30 years old when he won the eighth season, and Zeta Morrison, who was 29 years old when she won the fourth season.

== Key legend ==
Key

Winner
Runner-up
Third place
Fourth place
Dumped
Walked
Removed
Contestant entered for the second time
Contestant previously appeared or played on another version of the show

== Season 1–5 (2019–2023) ==
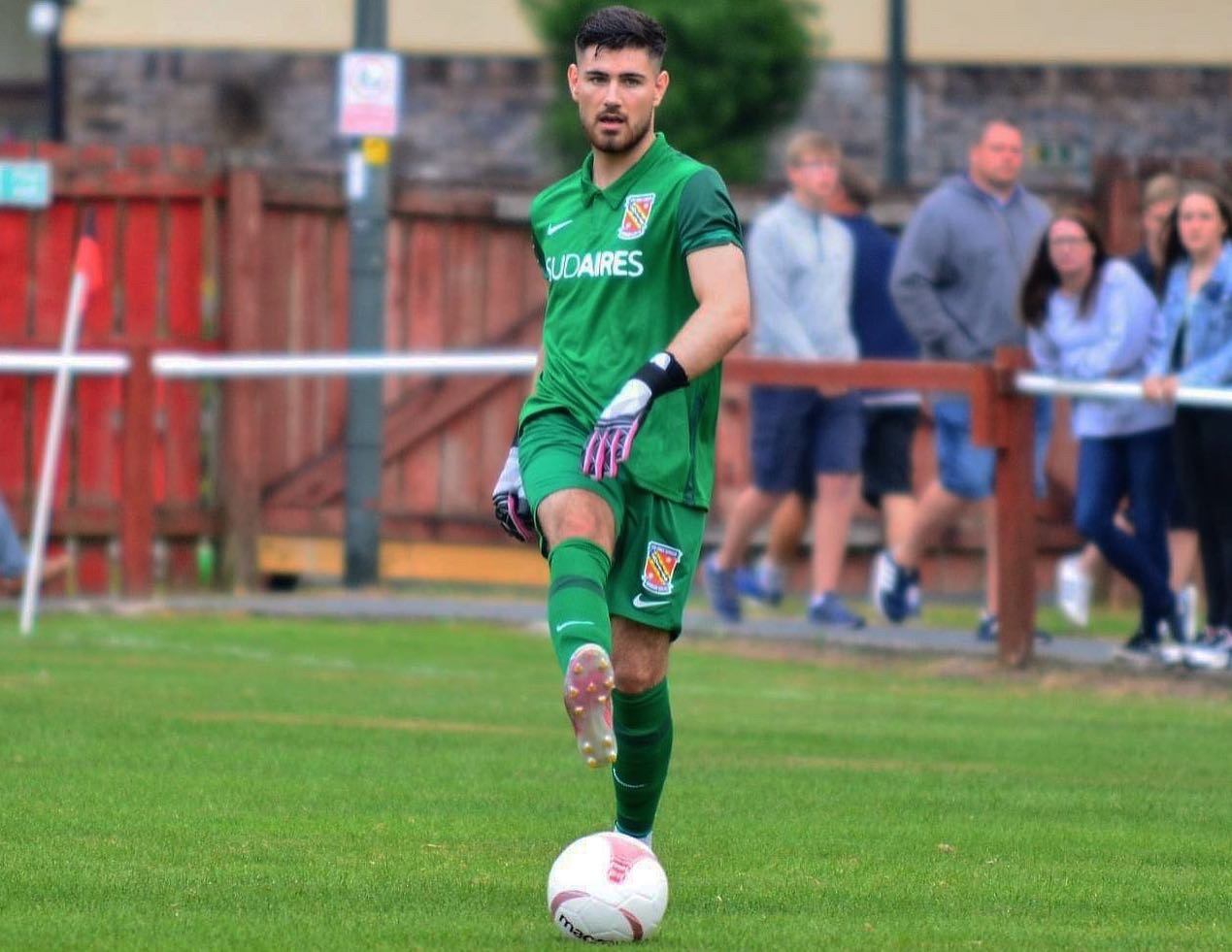
Scott van-der-Sluis, Season 5

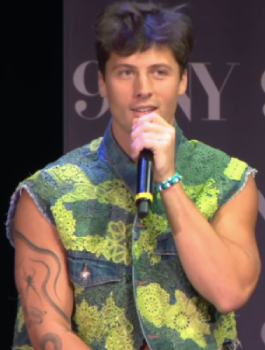
Rob Rausch, Season 5, Season 6

Name	Age	Hometown	Occupation	Season	Status	Ref.
Elizabeth Weber	24	New York City, New York	Advertising Executive	1	Winner	
Zac Mirabelli	22	Chicago, Illinois	Grocery Store Cashier	1	Winner	
Alexandra Stewart	26	Los Angeles, California	Publicist	1	Runner-up	
Dylan Curry	25	San Diego, California	Fitness and Lacrosse Coach	1	Runner-up	
Caroline "Caro" Viehweg	21	Los Angeles, California	Marketing Student	1	Third place	
Raymond "Ray" Gantt	23	Hillside, New Jersey	Student and Promoter	1	Third place	
Emily Salch	21	Groton, New York	Student and Bartender	1	Fourth place	
Weston Richey	25	Dallas, Texas	Photographer	1	Fourth place	
Kyra Green	22	Los Angeles, California	Musician	1	Dumped	
Jered Youngblood	27	Lakeland, Florida	Real Estate Agent	1	Dumped	
Yamen Sanders	24	Inglewood, California	Real Estate Agent	1	Dumped	
Aissata Diallo	25	Highbridge, New York	Model and Graduate Student	1	Dumped	
Eric Hall	27	Toronto, Ontario	Tattoo Shop Manager	1	Dumped	
Anton Morrow	23	Los Angeles, California	Personal Trainer	1	Dumped	
Kelsey Jurewicz	25	Newark, Delaware	Mortgage Marketing Manager	1	Walked	
Cashel Barnett	28	Sacramento, California	Musician	1	Dumped	
Katrina Dimaranan	26	San Francisco, California	College Student and Beauty Queen	1	Dumped	
Winston Hines	29	Lexington, Kentucky	Pharmaceutical Sales Representative	1	Dumped	
Marlisse "Marli" Tyndall	20	Miami, Florida	Bartender and Student	1	Dumped	
George Johnson	30	Beverly Hills, California	Interior Designer and Seller	1	Dumped	
Cormac Murphy	26	New York City, New York	Nightclub Promoter	1	Dumped	
Christen McAllister	24	Los Angeles, California	Sales and Business Development	1	Dumped	
Alana Morrison	21	New Haven, Connecticut	Student	1	Dumped	
Mallory Santic	26	Vancouver, Washington	Equity Analyst	1	Dumped	
Michael Yi	29	Miami, Florida	Model	1	Dumped	
Caleb Corprew	24	Oklahoma City, Oklahoma	IT Sales Consultant	2	Winner	
Justine Ndiba	27	Rockaway, New Jersey	Billing Coordinator and Go-Go Dancer	2	Winner	
Cely Vazquez	24	Sacramento, California	Legal Secretary	2	Runner-up	
Johnny Middlebrooks	22	Chesapeake, Virginia	Student	2	Runner-up	
Calvin Cobb	25	Houston, Texas	Sales Manager	2	Third place	
Moira Tumas	28	Brielle, New Jersey	Shopping Channel Model	2	Third place	
Carrington Rodriguez	23	Salt Lake City, Utah	Sales Manager	2	Fourth place	
Laurel Goldman	22	Auburn, Alabama	Eyelash Artist	2	Fourth place	
Bennett Sipes	26	Baltimore, Maryland	Executive Assistant	2	Dumped	
Lakeyn Call	21	Yorktown, Virginia	Marketing Student	2	Dumped	
Kierstan Saulter	23	Castroville, Texas	College Student and Bartender	2	Dumped	
Julia Hall	26	Fayetteville, North Carolina	Realtor	2	Dumped	
Connor Trott	23	Pittsburgh, Pennsylvania	Auditor	2	Dumped	
Bennie Bivens	24	Barnegat, New Jersey	Personal Trainer	2	Dumped	
Noah Purvis	24	Imperial, Missouri	Home Healthcare Provider	2	Removed	
Mackenzie Dipman	24	Scottsdale, Arizona	Student	2	Dumped	
Aaron Owen	26	Henderson, Nevada	Cake Decorator	2	Dumped	
Jalen Noble	27	Nashville, Tennessee	Account Executive	2	Dumped	
Sher Suarez	22	Miami, Florida	Hostess	2	Dumped	
De'Andre Heath	25	North Miami Beach, Florida	Pro-Baseball Player	2	Dumped	
Mike Jenkerson	26	San Jose, California	Sales Representative	2	Dumped	
Pat Albasha	28	San Dimas, California	Attorney	2	Dumped	
Faith Tyrell	26	Kansas City, Missouri	Pageant Coach	2	Dumped	
GiNiele Reitzell	24	Paramount, California	Sales Manager	2	Dumped	
Mercades Schell	26	Las Cruces, New Mexico	Nanny	2	Dumped	
Tre Forte	25	Boca Raton, Florida	Personal Trainer	2	Dumped	
Lauren Coogan	29	Oxford, United Kingdom	Family Assistant	2	Dumped	
Rachel Lundell	21	Minneapolis, Minnesota	Student	2	Dumped	
Jeremiah White	22	De Kalb, Mississippi	Store Sales Associate	2	Dumped	
James McCool	27	Winchester, Virginia	Personal Trainer	2	Dumped	
Kaitlynn Anderson	27	Lapeer, Michigan	Promotions	2	Dumped	
Korey Gandy	28	Virginia Beach, Virginia	Rental Car Agent	3	Winner	
Olivia Kaiser	28	Anchorage, Alaska	Business Owner	3	Winner	
Kyra Lizama	23	Honolulu, Hawaii	COVID-Relief Worker	3	Runner-up	
Will Moncada	26	Medellín, Colombia	Budtender	3	Runner-up	
Bailey Marshall	23	Portland, Oregon	Marketing Intern	3	Third place	
Jeremy Hershberg	27	New York City, New York	Personal Trainer	3	Third place	
Alana Paolucci	28	New York City, New York	Model	3	Fourth place	
Charlie Lynch	30	Houston, Texas	Trucking Company Owner	3	Fourth place	
Trina Njoroge	25	Hacienda Heights, California	Psychiatric Nurse	3	Dumped	
Andre Brunelli	28	Miami, Florida	Model	3	Dumped	
Elly Steffen	22	Chicago, Illinois	Neuroscience Graduate and Model	3	Dumped	
K-Ci Maultsby	27	Atlanta, Georgia	Barber and Personal Trainer	3	Dumped	
Cashay Proudfoot	25	Brooklyn, New York	Waitress	3	Dumped	
Josh Goldstein	24	Haverhill, Massachusetts	College Athlete	3	Walked	
Shannon St. Clair	25	Warminster, Pennsylvania	Controller at Construction Company	3	Walked	
Melvin "Cinco" Holland Jr.	25	Ashburn, Virginia	Delivery Driver	3	Dumped	
Genevieve Shawcross	22	West Chester, Pennsylvania	College Student	3	Dumped	
Leslie Golden	24	Redwater, Texas	Model	3	Removed	
Florence "Flo" Mueller	26	Miami, Florida	Model and Rapper	3	Dumped	
Isabel Johnson	21	Minneapolis, Minnesota	Beauty Advisor	3	Dumped	
Kay Taylor	24	Calabasas, California	Swimsuit Company Owner	3	Dumped	
Andrew John Phillips	28	Fort Lauderdale, Florida	Marketing Manager	3	Dumped	
Gabe Sadowsky	27	Nashua, New Hampshire	Personal Trainer	3	Dumped	
Kamryn "Kam" Mickens-Bennett	25	Summit, New Jersey	Student	3	Dumped	
Raul Frias	24	Hialeah, Florida	Athlete	3	Dumped	
Javonny Vega	26	Boca Raton, Florida	Real Estate Investor	3	Dumped	
Aimee Flores	26	Los Angeles, California	Private Chef	3	Dumped	
Florita Diaz	27	Miami, Florida	Model	3	Dumped	
Wes Ogsbury	24	Denver, Colorado	Entrepreneur	3	Dumped	
Isaiah Harmison	25	Houston, Texas	Personal Trainer	3	Dumped	
Slade Parker	27	Rome, Georgia	Printing and Advertising Business Owner	3	Walked	
Lei-Yen Rapp	28	Houston, Texas	Model	3	Dumped	
Roxy Ahmad	24	London, England	Account Manager	3	Dumped	
Christian Longnecker	24	Oahu, Hawaii	Coffee Company Owner	3	Dumped	
Timmy Pandolfi	29	New York City, New York	Trainer and Real Estate Agent	4	Winner	
Zeta Morrison	29	Surrey, United Kingdom	Babysitter and Model	4	Winner	
Isaiah Campbell	21	Sioux Falls, South Dakota	Waiter	4	Runner-up	
Sydney Paight	22	Houston, Texas	Tech Startup Manager	4	Runner-up	
Deborah "Deb" Chubb	26	Dallas, Texas	Assistant	4	Third place	
Jesse Bray	27	Springfield, Ohio	Courier	4	Third place	
Jeff Christian	25	Cincinnati, Ohio	Footballer	4	Walked	
Nadjha Day	23	Atlanta, Georgia	College Student	4	Walked	
Chad Robinson	23	Clarkston, Michigan	Personal Trainer and Bartender	4	Dumped	
Phoebe Siegel	21	Bedford Hills, New York	College Student	4	Dumped	
Mackenzie Dipman	25	Scottsdale, Arizona	Entrepreneur	4	Walked	
Joel Bierwert	27	Northampton, Massachusetts	Welder and Fabricator	4	Dumped	
Courtney Boerner	24	Winter Park, Florida	Stylist	4	Dumped	
Katherine "Kat" Gibson	22	Manassas, Virginia	Content Creator	4	Walked	
Chazz Bryant	21	Clifton, New Jersey	Athlete	4	Dumped	
Jared Hassim	23	Los Angeles, California	Dog Park Attendant	4	Dumped	
Chanse Corbi	21	Los Angeles, California	Medical Student	4	Dumped	
Gabriella "Bella" Barbaro	22	Long Island, New York	Client Specialist and Ad Sales	4	Dumped	
Nicholas "Nic" Birchall	22	Caracas, Venezuela	Real Estate Agent	4	Walked	
Kyle Fraser	29	Buffalo, New York	Full-Time Wedding Model	4	Removed	
Avery Grooms	24	Fresno, California	Restaurant Host	4	Dumped	
Gabby Kiszka	23	Westwood, New Jersey	Pharmaceutical Sales Representative	4	Dumped	
Jordan Morello	28	Plantation, Florida	Personal Trainer	4	Dumped	
Sam Kornse	24	Phillipsburg, New Jersey	Sales Representative	4	Dumped	
Tigerlily Cooley	24	Seattle, Washington	CEO of Tenth House Agency	4	Dumped	
Tre Watson	26	Corona, California	Youth Football Coach	4	Dumped	
Madison "Mady" McLanahan	26	Dallas, Texas	Social Media Marketing Manager	4	Walked	
Bryce Fins	30	San Diego, California	Financial Manager	4	Dumped	
Sereniti Springs	28	Clovis, California	Bartender	4	Dumped	
Andy Voyen	23	Minneapolis, Minnesota	Realtor	4	Dumped	
Bria Bryant	24	Clifton, New Jersey	Personal Shopper	4	Dumped	
Felipe Gomes	32	São Paulo, Brazil	International Model	4	Dumped	
Tyler Radziszewski	23	Cleveland, Ohio	Student	4	Dumped	
Valerie "Val" Bragg	23	San José, Costa Rica	Nutritional Consultant	4	Dumped	
Marco Donatelli	22	Girard, Ohio	Chiropractic Student	5	Winner	
Hannah Wright	24	Palm Springs, California	Teacher	5	Winner	
Kassandra "Kassy" Castillo	22	Fort Worth, Texas	Real Estate Student	5	Runner-up	
Leonardo Dionicio	21	West Hartford, Connecticut	Salesman	5	Runner-up	
Carsten "Bergie" Bergersen	23	Cottage Grove, Minnesota	Dairy Queen Manager	5	Third place	
Taylor Smith	24	Orange County, California	Hotel Manager	5	Third place	
Carmen Kocourek	22	Milwaukee, Wisconsin	Nanny	5	Fourth place	
Kenzo Nudo	26	Phoenix, Arizona	Travel Videographer and Photographer	5	Fourth place	
Destiny Davis	27	Florissant, Missouri	Microbiologist	5	Dumped	
Kyle Darden	24	Floral Park, New York	Soccer Coach	5	Dumped	
Johnnie Garcia	25	Whittier, California	Administrative Manager	5	Dumped	
Scott van-der-Sluis	22	Connah's Quay, United Kingdom	Footballer	5	Dumped	
Imani Wheeler	22	Sacramento, California	Direct Support Professional	5	Dumped	
Isiah "Zay" Harayda	23	Long Island, New York	Executive Sales Rep	5	Dumped	
Matia Marcantuoni	29	Toronto, Ontario	Clothing Brand Owner	5	Dumped	
Vickala "Kay Kay" Gray	25	Palestine, Texas	Travel Nurse	5	Walked	
Jonah Allman	24	Rancho Murieta, California	Rancher	5	Walked	
Keenan Anunay	23	Washington, D.C.	Student	5	Dumped	
Mike Stark	22	Augusta, Georgia	Car Salesman	5	Dumped	
Taylor Chmelka	23	San Diego, California	Advertising Account Manager	5	Dumped	
Hannah Ortega	22	Coral Springs, Florida	Influencer	5	Dumped	
Brandon Janse Van Vuuren	22	Johannesburg, South Africa	College Student and Behavioral Tech	5	Dumped	
Eddie Brown	26	Lagos, Nigeria	Bouncer & NFL Free Agent	5	Dumped	
Robert "Rob" Rausch	24	Florence, Alabama	Snake Wrangler	5	Dumped	
Allie Ryan	28	Madison, Wisconsin	Nursing Student	5	Dumped	
Ashley Sims	23	Jefferson City, Missouri	Beverage Cart Attendant and College Student	5	Dumped	
Dasja Johnson	27	Harrells, North Carolina	Data Processing Specialist	5	Dumped	
Najah Fleary	25	Bladensburg, Maryland	Nursing Student	5	Dumped	
Harrison Luna	26	Adelaide, Australia	Diamond Dealer	5	Dumped	
Emily Chavez	25	Houston, Texas	Hairdresser	5	Dumped	
Anna Kurdys	22	Boca Raton, Florida	Criminal Justice Student	5	Walked	
Victor Gonzalez	28	Atlanta, Georgia	Student and Wrestler	5	Dumped	
Jasmine Sklavanitis	24	Mount Morris, Illinois	Trauma Stepdown ICU Nurse	5	Dumped	

== Season 6–present (2024–present) ==
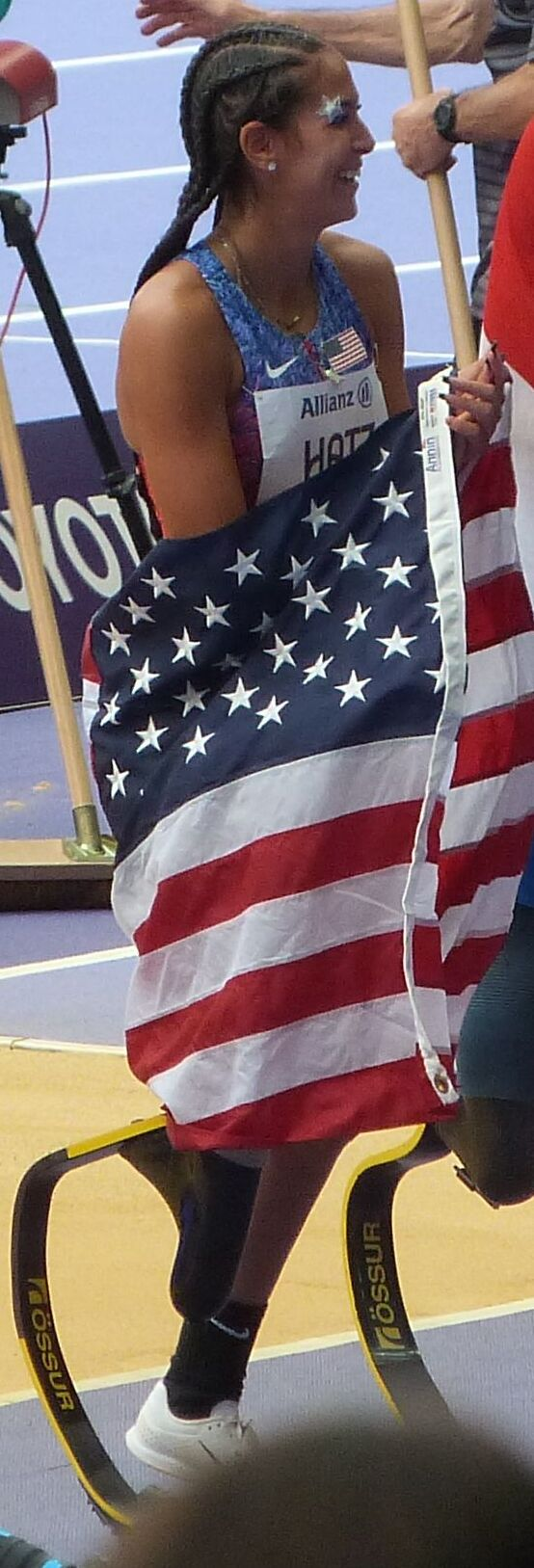
Beatriz Hatz, Season 8

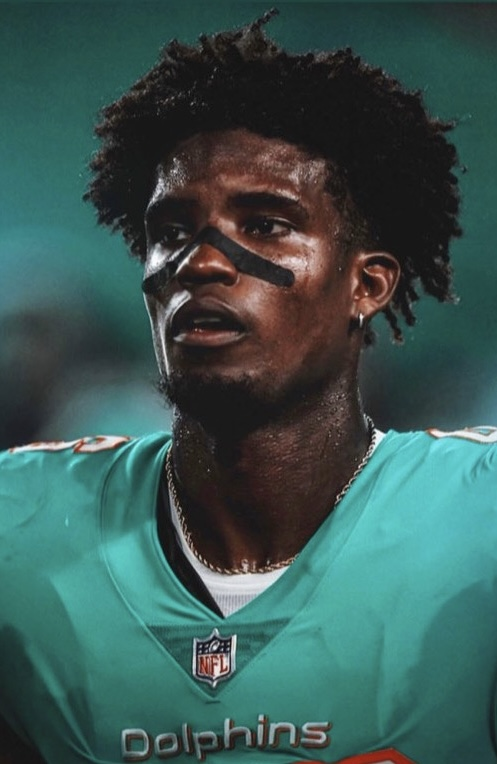
Tino Ellis, Season 8

Name	Age	Hometown	Occupation	Season	Status	Ref.
Kordell Beckham	22	Dallas, Texas	Aircraft Fueler and Model	6	Winner	
Serena Page	24	Houston, Texas	Media Planner	6	Winner	
Leah Kateb	24	Bell Canyon, California	College Student	6	Runner-up	
Miguel Harichi	27	London, England	Fitness Model	6	Runner-up	
JaNa Craig	27	Las Vegas, Nevada	Day Trader	6	Third place	
Kenneth "Kenny" Rodriguez	24	Dallas, Texas	Associate Account Manager	6	Third place	
Kendall Washington	27	Dallas, Texas	Medical Device Sales Territory Manager	6	Fourth place	
Nicole Jacky	26	Sacramento, California	Medical Sales	6	Fourth place	
Aaron Evans	26	North Devon, United Kingdom	Deck Hand	6	Dumped	
Kaylor Martin	22	Connellsville, Pennsylvania	Graduate College Student	6	Dumped	
Robert "Rob" Rausch	25	Florence, Alabama	Snake Wrangler	6	Dumped	
Kassandra "Kassy" Castillo	23	Fort Worth, Texas	Real Estate Student	6	Dumped	
Daniela Ortiz-Rivera	22	Longwood, Florida	College Student and Server	6	Dumped	
Sierra Mills	22	Los Angeles, California	Administrative Assistant and Bottle Waitress	6	Dumped	
Harrison Luna	27	Adelaide, Australia	Diamond Dealer	6	Dumped	
Caine Bacon	28	Norwich, United Kingdom	Security Guard and Personal Trainer	6	Dumped	
Olivia "Liv" Walker	21	Sydney, Australia	College Student	6	Dumped	
Catherine Marshall	24	Scottsdale, Arizona	Personal Assistant	6	Dumped	
Daia McGhee	27	Los Angeles, California	Photographer	6	Dumped	
Destiny Herzog	22	Scottsdale, Arizona	Model	6	Dumped	
George Vining	23	Athens, Georgia	Lab Research Assistant	6	Dumped	
Ignacio Ferrari	28	Buenos Aires, Argentina	International Model	6	Dumped	
Jacobi Graham	23	Houston, Texas	Personal Trainer	6	Dumped	
Jalen Oliver	24	Hagerstown, Indiana	College Student	6	Dumped	
Josiah Roebuck	25	Charlotte, North Carolina	Software Engineer	6	Dumped	
Sydney Leighton	24	New York City, New York	Unemployed	6	Dumped	
Cassidy Laudano	27	Miami, Florida	Influencer	6	Dumped	
Nigel Okafor	28	Houston, Texas	Bodybuilder	6	Dumped	
Connor Newsum	28	Santa Monica, California	PR Specialist	6	Dumped	
Hakeem White	29	Miami, Florida	Online Fitness and Business Coach	6	Dumped	
Andrea Carmona	25	Miami, Florida	Singer and Songwriter	6	Dumped	
Hannah Smith	26	Charlotte, North Carolina	Bottle Server	6	Dumped	
Coye Simmons	28	Winston-Salem, North Carolina	School District Unit Director	6	Dumped	
Amaya Espinal	25	New York City, New York	Registered Nurse	7	Winner	
Bryan Arenales	27	Boston, Massachusetts	Financial Accountant, Real Estate Agent, Bartender and Personal Trainer	7	Winner	
Nicolas "Nic" Vansteenberghe	24	Jacksonville, Florida	Registered Nurse and Model	7	Runner-up	
Olandria Carthen	27	Decatur, Alabama	Elevator Sales	7	Runner-up	
Chris Seeley	27	Fresno, California	Professional Basketball Player	7	Third place	
Huda Mustafa	24	Raleigh, North Carolina	Online Fitness Coach	7	Third place	
Iris Kendall	25	Los Angeles, California	Influencer	7	Fourth place	
Jose "Pepe" Garcia	27	Santa Ana, California	Trainer and Former Professional Basketball Player	7	Fourth place	
Ace Greene	22	Los Angeles, California	Content Creator	7	Dumped	
Michelle "Chelley" Bissainthe	27	Orlando, Florida	Day Trader	7	Dumped	
Clarke Carraway	24	Columbia, South Carolina	Behavioral Health Specialist	7	Dumped	
Taylor Williams	24	Oklahoma City, Oklahoma	Rodeo Cowboy	7	Dumped	
Elan Bibas	24	Richmond Hill, Ontario, Canada	Influencer, Data Engineer and Tech Consultant	7	Dumped	
Zak Srakaew	29	Roi Et, Thailand	International Model and Influencer	7	Dumped	
Cierra Ortega	25	Phoenix, Arizona	Digital Content Creator	7	Removed	
Andreina Santos	24	New York City, New York	Model	7	Dumped	
Austin Shepard	26	Northville, Michigan	Pool Cleaner	7	Dumped	
Gracyn Blackmore	25	Bristol, Virginia	Model	7	Dumped	
Jaden Duggar	25	Los Angeles, California	Corporate Investigator	7	Dumped	
Thomas "TJ" Palma	23	Westchester, New York	Baseball Player and Entrepreneur	7	Dumped	
Courtney "Coco" Watson	24	Los Angeles, California	Hair and Make-Up Artist	7	Dumped	
JD Dodard	23	Dallas, Texas	Fitness Coach	7	Dumped	
Savanna "Vanna" Einerson	21	Salt Lake City, Utah	Social Media and Brand Ambassador	7	Dumped	
Zac Woodworth	26	Portland, Oregon	Influencer	7	Dumped	
Jeremiah Brown	25	Los Angeles, California	Model	7	Dumped	
Hannah Fields	23	Tucson, Arizona	Fitness Content Creator	7	Dumped	
Jalen Brown	27	Sparta, Georgia	Trainer	7	Dumped	
Charlie Georgiou	27	Birmingham, United Kingdom	Model	7	Dumped	
Isabelle-Anne "Belle-A" Walker	22	Honolulu, Hawaii	Model and Coffee Shop Employee	7	Dumped	
Yulissa Escobar	27	Miami, Florida	Real Estate Agent	7	Removed	
Bryce Alakai Dettloff	29	Los Angeles, California	Model, DJ and Handyman	8	Winner	
Trinity Tatum	22	Newport News, Virginia	Model	8	Winner	
Aniya Harvey	23	Tyrone, Georgia	Nonprofit marketing director	8	Runner-up	
Carl Lee Schmidt	28	Denver, Colorado	Personal Trainer	8	Runner-up	
Melanie Moreno	24	North Philadelphia, Pennsylvania	Bikini Store Manager	8	Third place	
Sincere Rhea	25	Cape May, New Jersey	Track and Field Coach	8	Third place	
Kayda Bosse	22	Manchester, New Hampshire	Server	8	Fourth place	
Zach Georgiou	26	Birmingham, United Kingdom	Digital Creator	8	Fourth place	
Dylan Wrona	24	Chicago, Illinois	Model	8	Dumped	
Mackenzie "Kenzie" Annis	24	Kennesaw, Georgia	Nursing School Graduate	8	Dumped	
KC Chandler	23	Fresno, California	Nursing Assistant	8	Dumped	
Tierra Davis	25	Inglewood, California	Nanny and Model	8	Dumped	
Corbin Mims	22	Miami, Florida	Business Owner	8	Dumped	
Parmida Keshani	27	Isfahan, Iran (Note: Parmida Keshani is originally from Isfahan, Iran, but was residing in San Antonio, Texas at the time of casting and filming.)	Personal Trainer	8	Dumped	
Caleb McDaniel	21	Asheboro, North Carolina	Elevator Mechanic	8	Dumped	
Jaiden Bacciocco	22	Newbury Park, California	Recent College Graduate	8	Dumped	
Amora Cacheé Robinson	21	Atlanta, Georgia	Student	8	Re-dumped	
Gal Tshnieder	29	Los Angeles, California	Business Owner	8	Dumped	
Jennifer "Jen" Terry	23	Melbourne, Florida	Model	8	Dumped	
Chay Nehra	27	San Diego, California	Chiropractor	8	Dumped	
Corey Sawyer Jr.	24	Longwood, Florida	Former Basketball Player	8	Dumped	
Ronnie Gunter	25	Shakopee, Minnesota	Program Director	8	Dumped	
Sherleaz "Sydney" Eugene	25	Naples, Florida	Medical Assistant	8	Dumped	
Alannah Keyser	21	Miami, Florida	Film Student	8	Removed	
Chandlar Wilson	26	Oklahoma City, Oklahoma		8	Dumped	
Keyon Harry	24	North Babylon, New York	Professional Bodybuilder, Model, and Photographer	8	Dumped	
Kyle Greene	26	Tampa, Florida		8	Dumped	
Ryan Ten Hulscher	27	Silver City, New Mexico	Former Football Player	8	Dumped	
Tino Ellis	28	Queens, New York	Model and Former NFL Player	8	Dumped	
Trae Taylor	23	Missoula, Montana	Former Basketball Player	8	Dumped	
Gabriel Vasconcelos	26	Rio De Janeiro, Brazil (Note: Gabriel Vasconcelos is originally from Rio De Janeiro, Brazil, but was residing in Miami, Florida at the time of casting and filming.)	Model and DJ	8	Dumped	
Sol Dean	24	Orange, California	Model	8	Dumped	
Beatriz Hatz	25	San Diego, California	Paralympic Athlete	8	Dumped	
Sean Reifel	29	Easton, Pennsylvania	Police Officer	8	Dumped	

== Post filming ==
Islanders	Season	Still Together?	Status	Ref
Elizabeth Weber; Zac Mirabelli	1	No	Weber and Mirabelli split at the end of 2019.	
Alexandra Stewart; Dylan Curry	1	No	Stewart and Curry split in November 2019.	
Caro Viehweg; Ray Gantt	1	No	Viehweg and Gantt split in July 2020.	
Emily Salch; Weston Richey	1	No	Salch and Richey split in January 2020.	
Cashel Barnett; Kyra Green	1	No	Green and Barnett got back together after splitting on the show, but split in October 2019. They got back together a month later before breaking up again in February 2020.	
Caleb Corprew; Justine Ndiba	2	No	Corprew and Ndiba split in January 2021.	
Cely Vazquez; Johnny Middlebrooks	2	No	Vazquez and Middlebrooks split in January 2021.	
Calvin Cobb; Moira Tumas	2	No	Cobb and Tumas split in November 2020.	
Carrington Rodriguez; Laurel Goldman	2	No	Rodriguez and Goldman split in December 2020.	
Mackenzie Dipman; Connor Trott	2	No	Dipman and Trott split in March 2021.	
Korey Gandy; Olivia Kaiser	3	No	Gandy and Kaiser split in December 2021.	
Kyra Lizama; Will Moncada	3	No	Lizama and Moncada split shortly after leaving the villa but reconciled in June 2022. The couple split again in June 2025.	
Bailey Marshall; Jeremy Hershberg	3	No	Marshall and Hershberg split in August 2021.	
Alana Paolucci; Charlie Lynch	3	No	Paolucci and Lynch split in September 2021.	
Josh Goldstein; Shannon St. Clair	3	No	Goldstein and St. Clair left the villa together in a relationship, but split in June 2022 before getting back together four months later. They split for good in October 2023.	
Cinco Holland Jr. Cashay Proudfoot	3	No	Holland Jr. and Proudfoot split on the show, but got back together after they were both dumped from the villa. They split in January 2022.	
Aimee Flores; Wes Ogsbury	3	No	Flores and Ogsbury split in October 2021.	
Timmy Pandolfi; Zeta Morrison	4	No	Pandolfi and Morrison split in January 2023.	
Isaiah Campbell; Sydney Paight	4	No	Campbell and Paight split in December 2023.	
Deb Chubb; Jesse Bray	4	No	Chubb and Bray split in November 2022.	
Jeff Christian; Nadjha Day	4	No	Christian and Day split on the show, but got back together after leaving the villa. They broke up again in September 2022.	
Chad Robinson; Phoebe Siegel	4	No	Robinson and Siegel split in September 2022.	
Kat Gibson; Jared Hassim	4	No	Gibson and Hassim split in September 2022.	
Mady McLanahan; Andy Voyen	4	No	McLanahan left the villa to get back with Voyen, but they split in September 2022.	
Courtney Boerner; Bryce Fins	4	No	Boerner left the villa to get back with Fins, but split in September 2022.	
Hannah Wright; Marco Donatelli	5	Yes	Wright and Donatelli got engaged on May 28, 2025.	
Kassy Castillo; Leonardo Dionicio	5	No	Castillo and Dionicio split in October 2023.	
Carsten "Bergie" Bergersen; Taylor Smith	5	Yes	Bergersen and Smith got engaged on May 3, 2026	
Carmen Kocourek; Kenzo Nudo	5	No	Kocourek and Nudo split in July 2024.	
Kay Kay Gray; Keenan Anunay	5	No	Gray and Anunay split in December 2023.	
Jonah Allman; Taylor Chmelka	5	No	Allman and Chmelka split in September 2023.	
Kordell Beckham; Serena Page	6	Yes	Beckham and Page are still dating as of November 2026.	
Leah Kateb; Miguel Harichi	6	Yes	Kateb and Harichi are still dating as of November 2026.	
JaNa Craig; Kenny Rodriguez	6	No	Craig and Rodriguez split in July 2025.	
Kendall Washington; Nicole Jacky	6	No	Washington and Jacky split in August 2024.	
Aaron Evans; Kaylor Martin	6	No	Evans and Martin split in August 2024.	
Amaya Espinal; Bryan Arenales	7	No	Espinal and Arenales split in August 2025.	
Nic Vansteenberghe; Olandria Carthen	7	No	Vansteenberghe and Carthen split in July 2026.	
Iris Kendall; Pepe Garcia	7	No	Kendall and Garcia split in August 2025.	
Ace Greene; Chelley Bissainthe	7	No	Greene and Bissainthe split in December 2025.	
Clarke Carraway; Taylor Williams	7	No	Carraway and Williams split in July 2026.	
Iris Kendall; TJ Palma	7	Yes	Kendall and Palma split on the show following his dumping, but they got back together in September 2025, and are still together as of November 2026.	
Bryce Alakai Dettloff; Trinity Tatum	8	Yes	Dettloff and Tatum are still together as of November 2026.	
Aniya Harvey; Carl Lee Schmidt	8	No	Harvey and Schmidt split in October 2026.	
Melanie Moreno; Sincere Rhea	8	Yes	Moreno and Rhea are still together as of November 2026.	
Kayda Bosse; Zach Georgiou	8	Yes	Bosse and Georgiou are still together as of November 2026.	
Dylan Wrona; Kenzie Annis	8	Yes	Wrona and Annis are still together as of November 2026.	
KC Chandler; Tierra Davis	8	Yes	Chandler and Davis are still together as of November 2026.	
Corbin Mims; Parmida Keshani	8	No	Mims and Keshani split in August 2026.	
