= Matthew Hoffman (TV host) =

American TV host

- Born: Long Island, NY
- Occupation: TV host
- Years active: 1996 - present
- Known for: Narrator and co-writer of Love Island USA on CBS and Laid Bare on Paramount+.

Matthew Hoffman is an American television personality, TV host, narrator and Broadway investor. He is best known for being the narrator and co-writer of Love Island USA for over 125 episodes on CBS and Netflix and Laid Bare on Paramount+.

He has also served as an on-screen personality, correspondent, or host for television programs such as ABC News, Extra, and the 63rd Annual Grammy Awards. He is the creator and host of A-List Living on Hulu, and co-creator, series producer and host of Previously On; The Official Love Island USA Podcast With Matthew Hoffman produced by ITV America and Peacock. He was termed as the voice and soul of Love Island US. He is the co-creator and host of Fame To Table on Apple TV, as well as Love Notes, a weekly radio show for Amazon Radio. He also narrates the HGTV lifestyle television series Cheap A$$ Beach Houses.

== Early life and education ==
Hoffman was raised on Long Island, New York and graduated with a BFA in Musical Theatre from The Boston Conservatory.

== Career ==
=== Television hosting ===
==== Love Island USA/CBS ====
In 2019, Hoffman was chosen to be the official voice, narrator and co-writer of the inaugural season of the American version of Love Island.

Matthew Hoffman has voiced and co-written over 125 episodes of Love Island for CBS, with MUD referring to him as “the voice and soul” of Love Island. Buzzfeed wrote Hoffman was "the most iconic part of the show", Reality Blurred named Hoffman as all of the top three reasons why viewers should watch the reality TV show, while Vulture commented that Hoffman was one of the show's "biggest appeals.”

In addition to voicing all Love Island commercials from 2019 - 2022 Hoffman also wrote and voiced exclusive narration for The Bold and the Beautiful, The Young and the Restless, and Big Brother. The spots featured Hoffman's signature narration woven through previously filmed moments from all three shows.

It was announced he would return for the second season in August 2020.

On May 13, 2021, Hoffman hosted and moderated a live discussion regarding the CBS Reality Summer Slate. Hoffman interviewed Julie Chen Moonves, and Arielle Vandenberg, with the three announcing that both shows would premiere on July 7, exclusively on CBS. He returned for the show's third season in 2021.

He serves as a co-writer on the show. Hoffman also provided narration for the show's spinoffs on Paramount+. Hoffman made an appearance at an open casting call for Love Island hosted by the ECHL hockey team Orlando Solar Bears on March 4, 2020.

In 2020, Hoffman appeared as a special guest at the CBS Thanksgiving Day Celebration.

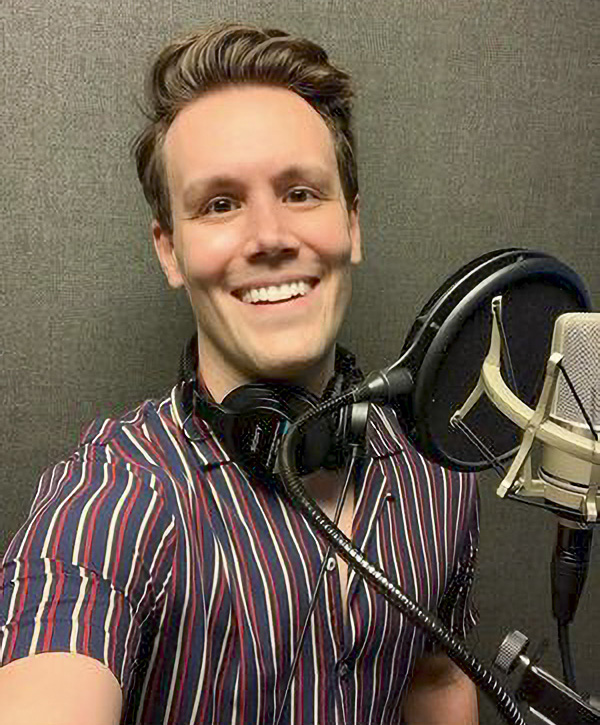
Matthew Hoffman records Love Island USA

==== ABC ====
In 2016, Hoffman hosted the segment "The Greatest Interview Ever with Matthew Hoffman" on ABC News’ People’s List, which starred Jerry O'Connell. Since 2019, Hoffman serves as a celebrity commentator for "The Year: with Robin Roberts" on ABC produced by ABC News, which airs on ABC and streams on Hulu. The 2024 season marked his fifth year with the show.

==== Award shows ====
Hoffman hosted the red carpet pre-show at the 34th Independent Spirit Awards in 2019.

In 2021, Matthew Hoffman announced the Billboard Music Awards’ off-air winners. Hoffman was the official host and of The 2021 Mastercard Grammy live preshow.

==== EXTRA ====
Since 2018, Hoffman has served as a special correspondent for Extra. In 2021, Hoffman interviewed Keanu Reeves live from the Castro Theater in San Francisco at the world premiere of The Matrix: Resurrections as a special correspondent for Extra.

In 2024, Hoffman interviewed Carol Burnett for Extra, with People Magazine running the exclusive.

==== FOX / Fran Drescher Talk Show ====
In 2010 Hoffman was the official correspondent on The Fran Drescher Tawk Show airing on Fox stations.

==== NBC Universal / E! ====
In 2009, Hoffman was a correspondent on That Morning Show for E!.

Hoffman was also one of the hosts of the digital series You Know That Scene for Focus Features.

Hoffman hosted Focus Features Trivia Night for NBC Universal. The 2021 season was recognized with a Clio shortlist award.

==== A- List Living / HULU ====
In 2023, Hoffman created the celebrity Real Estate show A- List Living for HULU and The Design Network. Hoffman serves as series creator, Executive Producer, and Host. The show has since been greenlit for Season 2.

==== Fame To Table with Matthew Hoffman ====
In 2025, Matthew Hoffman co-created, Executive Produced and hosted Fame To Table with Matthew Hoffman a celebrity culinary show, where he interviews famous chefs about the dish that made them famous. Fame To Table premiered on The Design Network and Apple TV.

==== HGTV / Warner Brothers ====
On December 10, 2025, it was announced that Hoffman would join HGTV as the narrator of the lifestyle television series Cheap A$$ Beach Houses. The series is produced by Warner Bros. Discovery and airs on HGTV and HBO Max. Hoffman confirmed the role in an in-studio interview with Derek Hough that aired nationally on Extra.

==== Other work ====
In 2021, Hoffman voiced promotions for Caesars Entertainment.

In 2016, Hoffman did an "interview" with Death Grips, however the interview was muted by music produced by the band. He is also featured on the cover of Interview 2016.

Hoffman also hosted the game show The Games We Play for Lionsgate. Hoffman was also the official voice of the TikTok special "Nostalgia". To mark the 25th Anniversary of “Friends” Hoffman hosted TBS PRESENTS: Friends 25th Anniversary Special LIVE for TBS.

In 1996 and 1997, Hoffman performed as Young Scrooge in A Christmas Carol at Madison Square Garden opposite Tony Randall and Ben Vereen. Jesse Eisenberg was his understudy.

== Theater investing ==
Hoffman is an investor in Magic Mike Live, as well as the Tony Award Winning Broadway shows Merrily We Roll Along, Sterophonic, Stranger Things, Life Of Pi, Prima Facie, A Strange Loop, Oh, Mary!, and the West End's A Little Life based on the best selling novel.

== In pop culture ==
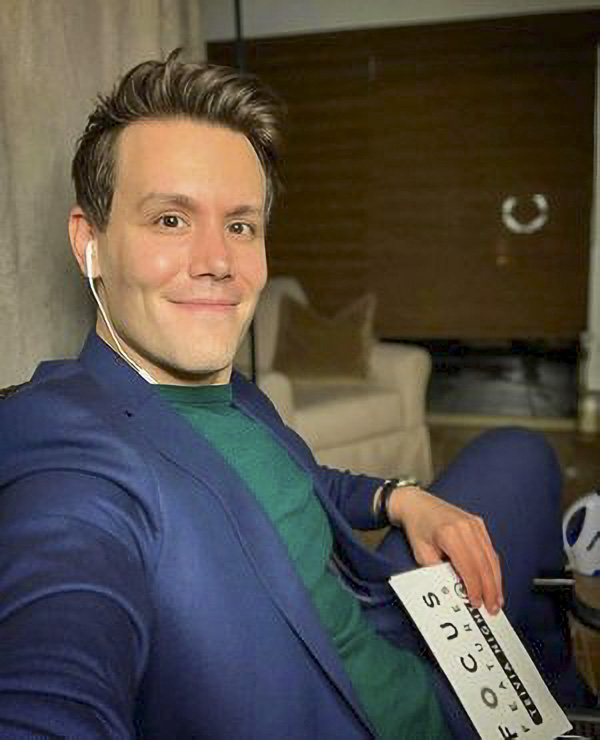
Matthew Hoffman hosts Focus Features Trivia Night

In her follow up to the "Fifty Shades Of Grey" series, Author E.L. James named a character after Hoffman in her romance novel "The Mister.”

Hoffman attended the Tony Awards as a guest of Vogue Editor Anna Wintour. Matthew was picked out of the audience by host Hugh Jackman and took to the stage of Radio City Music Hall, where the two had a musical encounter. That impromptu moment was reported in The New York Post with Liz Smith declaring "If Matthew Hoffman becomes a star it'll be the best up-from-nowhere tale since Shirley MacLaine." Hoffman and Wintour publicly reunited at the Tony Awards in 2016 where they spoke about the evening in an on camera interview for ABC.

== Philanthropy ==
Hoffman has been volunteering weekly since 2010 and his volunteer program "Tuesdays With Matthew" has raised thousands of meals for Meals On Wheels America. In March 2020, Hoffman raised over $12,000 for Meals On Wheels COVID outreach. His volunteer work was profiled on the cover of The New York Times "Sunday Styles" section.

== Filmography ==
=== Television ===
Year	Title	Role	Ref.
2009	That Morning Show on E!	Correspondent	
2010	The Fran Drescher Tawk Show	Correspondent	
2015–Present	Sit Down With The Stars	Host / Writer	
2016	Interview 2016	Interviewer	
2016	People's List / The Greatest Interview Ever With Matthew Hoffman	Correspondent	
2018–Present	Extra	Special Correspondent	
2018	The Games We Play	Game Show Host	
2018	Entertainment Weekly Presents	Red Carpet Host	
2019–Present	Love Island USA	Narrator / Co-Writer / VO Producer	
2019–Present	Laid Bare	Narrator / Co-Writer / VO Producer	
2019–Present	The Year With Robin Roberts	Celebrity Commentator	
2019	Independent Spirit Awards	Red Carpet Host	
2019	You Know That Scene	Host	
2019	Capitol Records Presents: NCT 127	Host	
2020	CBS Alone Together Campaign	Self	
2020	CBS Thanksgiving Day Celebration	Special Guest	
2020	The Young And The Restless	Narrator	
2020–Present	Focus Features Trivia Night LIVE	Host	
2020–Present	Downton Abbey Trivia Night	Host	
2020–Present	Focus Features x Syfy	Host	
2020–Present	Focus Features Cleo Awards	Host	
2021	Entertainment Tonight	Self	
2021	Let's Talk Big Brother and Love Island	Host	
2021	The Grammy Awards Pre Show	Red Carpet Host / Co-Writer	
2021	Billboard Music Awards	Off-air Host	
2022	Previously On; The Official Love Island USA Podcast With Matthew Hoffman	Host/Co-creator	
2023	Love Notes	Host / Co-Creator	
2023	A List Living	Executive Producer, Host	
2025	Fame To Table with Matthew Hoffman	Co-Creator, Executive Producer, Host	
2025	The Sabrina Soto Show	Self	
2025	Good Day LA	Self	
2025	CBS KCal News	Self	
2026	Cheap A$$ Beach Houses	Narrator	

=== Theater ===
Year	Title	Role	Ref.
1996-1997	A Christmas Carol	Young Scrooge	
