= LIU Brooklyn =

Private university in New York City, U.S.

Coordinates: 40.6911°N 73.9808°W

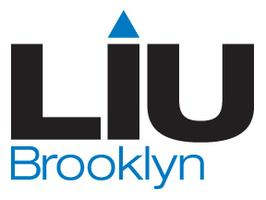
- Motto: Urbi et Orbi
- Type: Private university
- Established: 1926; 100 years ago
- Parent institution: Long Island University
- President: Kimberly R. Cline
- Students: 11,200
- Location: Brooklyn, New York, U.S.
- Campus: Urban
- Nickname: Sharks
- Sporting affiliations: NCAA Division I – NEC
- Mascot: Shark
- Website: liu.edu/Brooklyn.aspx

LIU Brooklyn is a private university in the borough of Brooklyn in New York City, New York, United States. It is the original unit and first of two main campuses of the private Long Island University system.

== Campus ==
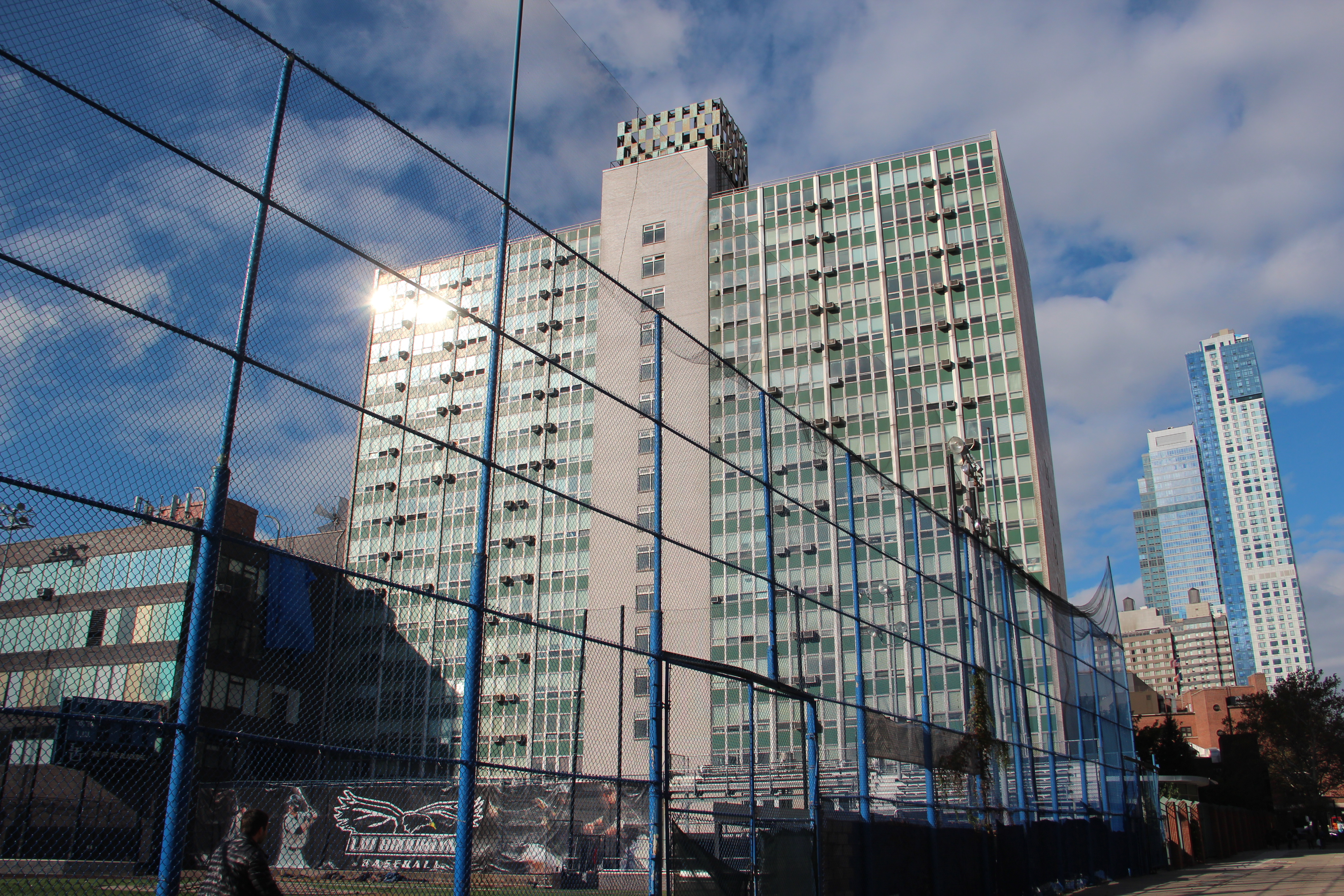
Conolly Residence Hall

LIU Brooklyn is located at the intersection of Flatbush and DeKalb Avenues (across the street from Junior's restaurant and City Point). The campus is served by the convergence of several New York City Subway services at DeKalb Avenue (B, D, N, Q, R, and W trains), Nevins Street (2, 3, 4, and 5 trains), and Jay Street–MetroTech (A, C, F, <F>, N, R, and W trains). The Long Island Rail Road's Atlantic Branch is also nearby, as the Atlantic Terminal is located three blocks from campus.

The former Brooklyn Paramount Theater was the world's first theater built specifically for talking pictures. The theater, which abuts the original core campus, was bought in 1960 by LIU and converted into a gymnasium in 1963.

== History ==
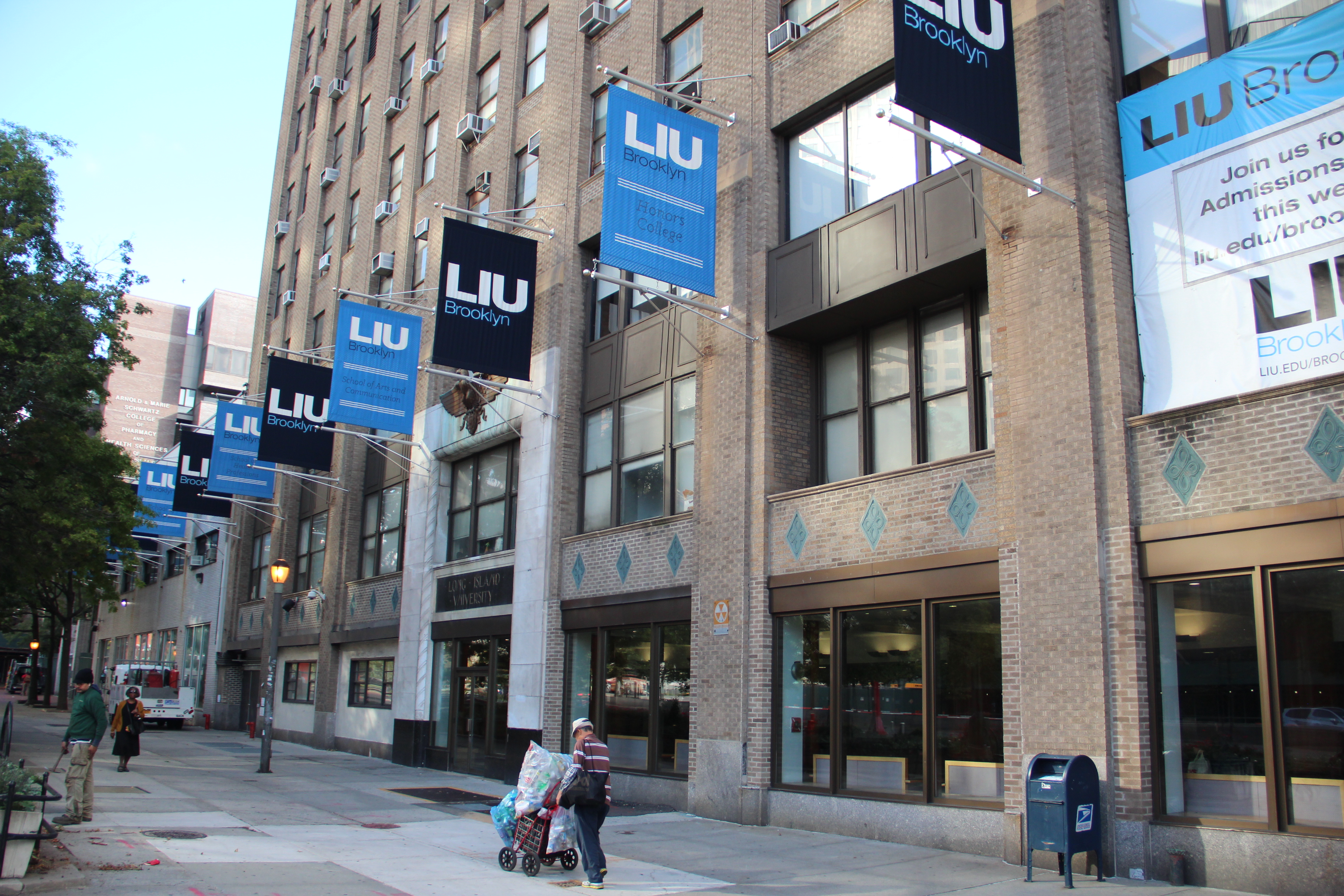
Student union building

The first class at the campus' original site, located at 300 Pearl Street, had 312 students from the surrounding neighborhoods. The majority of students were immigrants or the children of immigrants, many of whom were the first in their families to ever attend college or school in general.

In 1929, the university affiliated itself with the Brooklyn College of Pharmacy, now known as LIU Pharmacy (the Arnold and Marie Schwartz College of Pharmacy and Health Sciences). In the late 1960s, plans were proposed by several trustees to sell the Brooklyn Campus in order to finance a new graduate campus on Long Island. Students and faculty held demonstrations protesting those plans. In 1972, administrators and faculty members negotiated the first collectively bargained faculty agreement at a private university in the United States. In the fall of 2016, the university locked out its faculty union and assigned administrators and replacement hires to teach classes. The lockout resulted in a student walk out and protest and the loss of two weeks of semester time. The LIU faculty responded by voting for ouster of the president, Kimberly Cline.

== Athletics ==
Prior to the 2019–2020 school year, the Long Island University system unified its athletic programs and now all LIU athletic teams are referred to as the LIU Sharks and compete as a unified LIU athletic program.

Prior to 2019, LIU Brooklyn was the only unit of the LIU system to compete in Division I athletics and had 18 varsity teams. The school mascot was the Blackbirds.

In 1935–1936, the men's basketball team won all 25 of its games and was considered the top team in the country. With basketball becoming an Olympic sport, it seemed certain that the five starting players for the United States basketball team in the 1936 Summer Olympics in Berlin would be the five starters at LIU. However, because of the brutal anti-Jewish government in Germany, the team held a secret ballot and voted to not participate.

The men's basketball team won the National Invitation Tournament (NIT) in 1939 and 1941 under the guidance of Coach Clair Bee. However, in 1951, the Blackbirds basketball players were involved in what's referred to as the CCNY point-shaving scandal that resulted in five players receiving a suspended sentence, one player receiving a one-year prison sentence, and two former players receiving multi-year prison sentences for taking part in the scheme as fixers for the gamblers. The basketball team was suspended for six years from 1951 to 1957. Games were played at the Brooklyn Paramount Theater until recently.

In 1997, the Blackbirds were seeded 13th in the East Region of the NCAA men's basketball tournament. They lost in the first round to Villanova, 101–91. In 2011, LIU Brooklyn won both the Northeast Conference regular-season and tournament championship, winning 13 in a row at the end of the season. The Blackbirds were seeded 15th in the East Region of the 2011 NCAA Men's Division I Basketball Tournament losing in the first round to second-seeded University of North Carolina.

== Academics ==
- LIU Pharmacy (the Arnold and Marie Schwartz College of Pharmacy and Health Sciences), founded in 1886
- The Harriet Rothkopf Heilbrunn School of Nursing
- The Richard L. Conolly College of Liberal Arts and Sciences
- The School of Business, Public Administration, and Information Sciences
- School of Education
- School of Health Professions
- School of Continuing Education
- LIU Global
- Honors College
- The TV Writer's Studio: a 2-year MFA in Writing and Producing for Television, helmed by Norman Steinberg, cowriter of the film Blazing Saddles.

== Ranking ==
For 2026, U.S. News & World Report ranked LIU tied for #373 in National Universities.

== Notable alumni ==
- Amaya Espinal (born 1999), nurse, model and winner of Love Island USA.
- Farah Louis, (born 1983), member of the New York City Council
- Ossie Schectman (1919–2013), basketball player who scored the first basket in National Basketball Association history
- Bernice Rosenthal Walters Nordstrom, (1912-1975), physician, first female doctor to serve aboard a U.S. Navy ship during wartime.
