= Tefi Pessoa =

American influencer and host

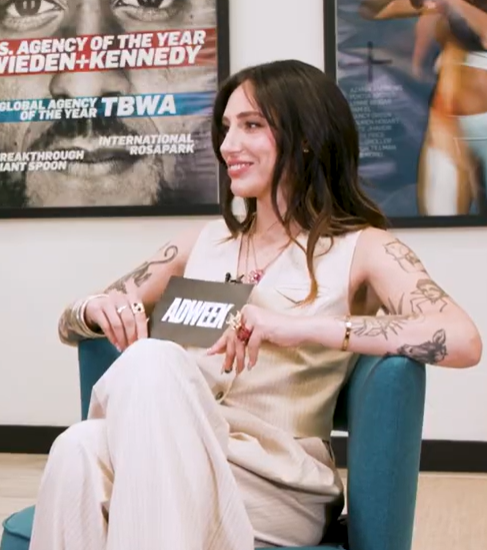
- Pessoa in 2024
- Born: Estefanía Vanegas Pessoa; 1990 or 1991 (age 35–36); Miami, Florida, U.S.
- Occupations: Influencer, host

Estefanía Vanegas Pessoa, known professionally as Tefi Pessoa (born 1990 or 1991), is an American influencer, advice columnist, and host. She is known for her content focusing on pop culture and her show, The Tefi Pessoa Show. She gained further attention after co-hosting Season 8 of Love Island USA: Aftersun, and has also co-hosted Influenced and worked as a digital correspondent for InStyle.

== Biography ==
Pessoa was born and raised in Miami to a Colombian mother and a Brazilian father who split when she was young. She dropped out of college. In 2012, when she was 22, she went to Bogotá to spend six months with family after what she had described as an "identity crisis". She subsequently moved to Brooklyn. Her first job there was as a "Head of Community", but her role was answering phones. She was subsequently hired after an audition to host a YouTube show which became the Tefi Pessoa Show.

She first gained viral attention after joining TikTok in 2020, where she began creating content focused on pop culture. She also created her own podcast, Tefi Talks and worked as a digital correspondent for InStyle. She runs an advice column, Ask Tefi, in The Cut.

In 2024, she co-hosted Influenced on Prime Video with other social media influencers including Cyrus Veyssi.

In 2026, she became co-host of Love Island USA: Aftersun for Season 8, working with Ciara Miller. This led to her going viral in her own right. She has stated that she wanted to "interfere with nature" when watching the Love Island episodes. During this time, she received internet criticism for her comments which were alternately called "man-haters" and "male-centered", which she responded to by stating that the show is necessarily trimmed. She has emphasized humanizing the contestants.

She has subsequently discussed her interest in completing a book she states she's been working on for two years, writing a book of poems, and writing short stories and short films.

She was listed on the Time100 Creators in 2025 and was named one of the top social media creators of 2025 by Rolling Stone. She was also named one of Mashable's top creators. As of 2026, she had over 2.3 million followers.

She is openly bisexual and has been dating content creator Shannon Beveridge since early 2025.
