= Love Island USA =

American dating reality series

- Also known as: Love Island
- Genre: Reality
- Based on: Love Island by Richard Cowles
- Presented by: Arielle Vandenberg; Sarah Hyland; Ariana Madix
- Starring: Love Island USA contestants
- Narrated by: Matthew Hoffman; Iain Stirling
- Country of origin: United States
- Original language: English
- No. of seasons: 8
- No. of episodes: 270 (list of episodes)

Production
- Executive producers: Mandy Morris; Simon Thomas (2019–2024); Ben Thursby-Palmer; David George; Adam Sher; David Eilenberg; Richard Foster (2019–2024); Chet Fenster (2019–2025); James Barker (2022–2026); Jordana Hochman; Bernie Schaeffer; Blake Garrett; Courtney Rosenthal; Sophie Brown; Richard Cowles; Mike Spencer; Tom Gould; Ali Hill; Martin Oxley
- Production locations: Fiji (season 1, seasons 5 – present); Las Vegas, Nevada (season 2); Hawaii (season 3); California (season 4)
- Cinematography: Quinn Jessop
- Production company: ITV Entertainment
- Budget: $30 million

Original release
- Network: CBS
- Release: July 9, 2019 – August 15, 2021
- Network: Peacock
- Release: July 19, 2022 – present

Related
- Love Island (franchise); Love Island Games; Love Island: Beyond the Villa; Love Island: All Stars

Love Island USA (also known as Love Island from seasons 1–3) is an American dating reality show based on the British series Love Island. The series was originally announced and commissioned in 2018, by CBS, and premiered on July 9, 2019, where it aired for its first three seasons. The series was then sold to Peacock, where it has aired since the fourth season. The show is presented by Ariana Madix and narrated by Iain Stirling. Arielle Vandenberg hosted the first three seasons, and Sarah Hyland hosted the fourth and fifth seasons.

The series has achieved greater success on Peacock. The show notably broke viewership records during its sixth and seventh seasons, becoming the #1 reality series in the U.S. across all streaming platforms, according to Nielsen data. Those records were then broken again with the eighth season achieving over 2.3 billion minutes streamed halfway through the season. The series is notable for strategically utilizing social media to promote the show, with clips often going viral across varied platforms, leading many critics to label it a "pop culture phenomenon." As a result of its success, Peacock green-lit the spin-offs Love Island Games and Love Island: Beyond the Villa.

The show has been renewed for a ninth season, set to premiere in summer 2027.

== Format ==
Love Island involves a group of contestants, referred to as Islanders, living in isolation from the outside world in a villa, constantly under video surveillance. To survive in the villa, the Islanders must be coupled up with another Islander, whether it be for love, friendship, or survival, as the overall winning couple receives $100,000. In past seasons, only one person in the couple would get the $100,000 and would have to determine whether or not they wanted to split the money. On the first day, the Islanders couple up based on first impressions, but over the duration of the series, they are forced to "re-couple" where they can choose (or be chosen) to remain in their current couple or swap and change. The initial couplings are determined by first impressions, either from the public or islanders themselves.

Any Islander who remains single after the coupling is at risk of being eliminated and "dumped" from the island. Islanders can also be eliminated via a public vote during the series. The public can vote for their favorite couple or who they think is the most compatible through the Love Island app available on smartphones. Couples who receive the fewest votes risk being eliminated. Occasionally, twists may occur where the islanders must eliminate each other. During the final week, the public votes for which couple they want to win the series and take home the prize.

While in the villa, each Islander has their own phone with which they can only take photos and contact other Islanders via text – or receive texts informing them of the latest challenges, dumping, or re-coupling. Islanders and couples take part in many games and challenges. Some Islanders are also sent on dates outside the villa or can win dates by winning challenges. Occasionally, a pair of islanders is chosen to go to the Hideaway, where they are able to spend one night together apart from the other couples.

== Hosts ==
Color key

Host/Narrator
Guest/Guest Host

Roles	Season							
Roles	1	2	3	4	5	6	7	8
Main Host
Arielle Vandenberg								
Sarah Hyland								
Ariana Madix								
Aftersun Host
Maura Higgins								
Sophie Monk								
Ciara Miller								
Tefi Pessoa								
Narrator
Matthew Hoffman								
Iain Stirling								

== Series overview ==
Season	Islanders	Days	Location	Host	Episodes	Originally released			Winners	Runners-up
Season	Islanders	Days	Location	Host	Episodes	First released	Last released	Network	Winners	Runners-up
1	25	30	Fiji	Arielle Vandenberg	22	July 9, 2019	August 7, 2019	CBS	Elizabeth Weber & Zac Mirabelli	Alexandra Stewart & Dylan Curry
2	31	40	Las Vegas, Nevada	Arielle Vandenberg	34	August 24, 2020	September 30, 2020	CBS	Caleb Corprew & Justine Ndiba	Cely Vazquez & Johnny Middlebrooks
3	34	40	Nīnole, Hawaii	Arielle Vandenberg	29	July 7, 2021	August 15, 2021	CBS	Korey Gandy & Olivia Kaiser	Kyra Lizama & Will Moncada
4	34	32	Santa Barbara, California	Sarah Hyland	38	July 19, 2022	September 1, 2022	Peacock	Timmy Pandolfi & Zeta Morrison	Isaiah Campbell & Sydney Paight
5	33	32	Viseisei, Fiji	Sarah Hyland	37	July 18, 2023	August 27, 2023	Peacock	Hannah Wright & Marco Donatelli	Kassy Castillo & Leonardo Dionicio
6	33	32	Viseisei, Fiji	Ariana Madix	37	June 11, 2024	August 19, 2024	Peacock	Kordell Beckham & Serena Page	Leah Kateb & Miguel Harichi
7	30	32	Viseisei, Fiji	Ariana Madix	37	June 3, 2025	August 25, 2025	Peacock	Amaya Espinal & Bryan Arenales	Nicolas Vansteenberghe & Olandria Carthen
8	34	32	Viseisei, Fiji	Ariana Madix	36	June 2, 2026	August 31, 2026	Peacock	Bryce Alakai & Trinity Tatum	Aniya Harvey & Carl Lee Schmidt

== Production ==
The title card from Seasons 1–3.

=== Development ===
On February 22, 2006, it was announced that an American version of Celebrity Love Island was in development at MyNetworkTV, but the show was not produced. On August 8, 2018, it was reported that CBS acquired the rights to an American non-celebrity version of the series from ITV Studios and Motion Content Group with David George, Adam Sher, and David Eilenberg serving as executive producers. Simon Thomas, Mandy Morris, Ben Thursby, Richard Foster, and Chet Fenster later joined the series as additional executive producers in addition to the original three. Arielle Vandenberg was later announced to be hosting the series.

The first season of Love Island ran from July 9, 2019, to August 7, 2019. It was filmed at Villa Takali, in Fiji. The show was renewed for a second season on August 1, 2019, while the first season was still being broadcast. On January 27, 2021, it was announced that the show was renewed for a third season, this time taking place in Hawaii. On May 13, 2021, it was announced that the third season would premiere on July 7, 2021. On February 23, 2022, the series was renewed for a fourth and fifth season and moved to Peacock in summer 2022. The fourth season took place in California. On November 16, 2023, Peacock renewed the series for a sixth and seventh season. With the sixth season premiere on June 11, 2024, there were new twists and turns, including a new host. Previously, Love Island USA was hosted by Sarah Hyland, whereas season six and seven were hosted by Ariana Madix in the all new villa located in Fiji. On March 13, 2026, Peacock renewed the series for season eight with a premiere date set for June 2, 2026.

Maura Higgins was announced as the host for the Love Island USA Aftersun in season six. Sophie Monk joined as the new host of Aftersun for season seven, though Higgins returned as host for the last episode. Eyal Booker filled in for Monk as the Aftersun host for a single episode during the season. On May 11, 2026, it was announced that Summer House star Ciara Miller and internet personality Tefi Pessoa would co-host Aftersun season eight.

=== Broadcast ===
Love Island opened with a 90-minute premiere on July 9, 2019, and aired every weeknight through August 7, 2019, for a total of 22 episodes in its first season. In addition to the CBS broadcasts, the series is simulcast on CTV in Canada, with the second season also airing in Australia on the 9Now streaming platform. In the United Kingdom, it also aired on ITVBe in 2019 then later ITV2 in 2020. ITVBe acquired its third season.

== Ratings ==
Viewership and ratings per season of Love Island USA
Season	Timeslot (ET)	Episodes	First aired		Last aired		TV season	Avg. viewers (millions)	Avg. 18–49 rating
Season	Timeslot (ET)	Episodes	Date	Viewers (millions)	Date	Viewers (millions)	TV season	Avg. viewers (millions)	Avg. 18–49 rating
1	Weeknights 8:00 p.m.	22	July 9, 2019	2.61	August 7, 2019	2.54	2018–19	2.19	0.47
2	Weeknights 9:00 p.m.	34	August 24, 2020	1.89	September 30, 2020	2.03	2019–20	1.82	0.41
3	Sundays, Tuesdays–Fridays 9:00 p.m.	29	July 7, 2021	1.86	August 15, 2021	1.64	2020–21	1.65	0.37

== Spin-offs ==
=== Love Island Games (2023–present) ===
A spin-off, Love Island Games, premiered on Peacock in November 2023. Following the conclusion of the sixth season of the American version, it was announced in August 2024 that the series had been renewed for a second season. On May 11, 2026, it was announced that the series would return for a third season.

=== Love Island USA: Aftersun (2024–present) ===
In June 2024, it was confirmed that a new spin-off show, Love Island: Aftersun, would air during the sixth season.

It airs live on Saturday and includes celebrity guests and former Islanders from Love Island USA and international seasons. The programme was originally hosted by former Love Island UK contestant Maura Higgins. It was reported that Love Island Australia host Sophie Monk would fill in for Higgins as host for season 7, though Higgins returned as host for the last episode. Eyal Booker took over for Monk as guest host for one episode. On May 11, 2026, it was announced that Summer House star Ciara Miller and influencer and advice columnist Tefi Pessoa would co-host Aftersun for season eight.

=== Love Island: Beyond the Villa (2025–present) ===
In April 2025, it was announced that Peacock greenlit a new spinoff consisting of the season 6 islanders. The show premiered on July 13, 2025 and followed the islanders as they chase their dreams, explore new relationships, and face the realities of fame, without the villa walls. The cast included JaNa Craig, Aaron Evans, Miguel Harichi, Leah Kateb, Kaylor Martin, Connor Newsum, Serena Page, Kenny Rodriguez, Olivia Walker, and Kendall Washington. Other former islanders made appearances as well.

In November 2025, the show was renewed for a second season featuring season 7 islanders. The cast included Amaya Espinal, Andreina Santos-Marte, Belle-A Walker, Bryan Arenales, Chris Seeley, Clarke Carraway, Coco Watson, Gracyn Blackmore, Hannah Fields, Iris Kendall, Jeremiah Brown, Pepe Garcia-Gonzalez, Taylor Williams, and TJ Palma.

== See also ==
- Big Brother (American TV series)
- The Challenge (TV series)
- Perfect Match (TV series)
