= Nicolas Vansteenberghe =

American DJ and television personality (born 2001)

Nic Vansteenberghe
- Born: Nicolas Marcel Vansteenberghe; March 20, 2001 (age 25)
- Education: Florida Atlantic University
- Occupations: DJ; Model; Influencer; Television personality
- Height: 6 ft 2.5 in (1.89 m)
- Website: nicvans.com

Nicolas "Nic" Marcel Vansteenberghe (born March 20, 2001) is an American DJ, model, influencer, and television personality. He appeared on the seventh season of Love Island USA in 2025, where he finished in second place.

== Early life and education ==
Nic Vansteenberghe is originally from Miami, Florida. He has a younger sister named Ella. He attended Bartram Trail High School, where he was a swimmer. He later attended Florida Atlantic University, where he earned a degree in nursing. After graduation, he worked as a registered nurse, caterer, and model.

== Career ==
In May 2025, Vansteenberghe was announced as a contestant on the seventh season of Love Island USA. He finished as the runner-up alongside Olandria Carthen. Vansteenberghe later made a guest appearance on the second season of Love Island: Beyond the Villa.

Following his Love Island USA appearance, Vansteenberghe modeled in multiple brand campaigns alongside Olandria, including Sweetgreen. He has also partnered with brands such as Celsius and Dove Men Care, starred in a fictional holiday rom-com for Google alongside Nicole Byer and Ciara Miller, Ad Age named him one of the top five breakout creators of 2025 and Cosmopolitan included him in their Z-Stars Class of 2025.

Prior to his reality television debut, Vansteenberghe was represented by Next Miami Management and DT Model Management, working in print and runway campaigns, and modeling for brands such as Kulani Kinis, Guess and Prada. In March 2023, he appeared on the cover of The Perfect Man magazine. In December 2025, Vansteenberghe appeared on Glamour's holiday cover with Olandria. He was featured on the cover of Folie Magazine's Spring 2026 issue, and was included in Vulture's inaugural class of "Reality TV Masterminds".

Vansteenberghe began a career as a professional DJ under the stage name "Nic Vans". In February 2026, he released his debut single - a remix of "3am" by Laszewo. In March, Vansteenberghe won the Off-Platform Buzz award at Snapchat's inaugural Snappy Awards. In June, Vansteenberghe was announced as a cast member on the second season of Destination X.

== Personal life ==
Nic Vansteenberghe and Olandria ended their relationship as of July 2026, a year after meeting on Love Island USA.

== Filmography ==
Television
Year	Title	Notes	Refs.
2025	Love Island USA	Season 7; runner-up	
2026	Love Island: Beyond the Villa	Season 2; guest	
2026	Destination X	Season 2	

== Awards ==
Awards
Year	Award	Category	Role	Result	Refs.
2026	Snapchat's Snappy Awards	Off-Platform Buzz Award	Himself	Won	
2026	Snapchat's Snappy Awards	Breakout Creator	Himself	Nominated	

Listicles
Year	Publisher	Listicle	Refs.
2025	Cosmopolitan	Z-Stars Class of 2025	
2025	Cosmopolitan	Best New Couple	
2025	Ad Age	Top 5 Breakout Creators of 2025	
2026	Vulture	The Masterminds of Reality TV	
