= Love Island USA season 7 =

2025 season of Love Island USA

Love Island USA
- Season 7
- Promotional poster for the season.
- Hosted by: Ariana Madix
- No. of days: 32
- No. of contestants: 30
- Winners: Bryan Arenales; Amaya Espinal
- Runners-up: Olandria Carthen; Nicolas "Nic" Vansteenberghe
- No. of episodes: 37

Release
- Original network: Peacock
- Original release: June 3 – August 25, 2025

Season chronology
- ← Previous; Season 6 Next → Season 8

The seventh season of the American version of the television reality program Love Island premiered on June 3, 2025. The season is hosted by Ariana Madix.

== Format ==
Love Island is a reality television program where a large group of contestants, who are referred to as "Islanders," are living in a villa in Fiji. The Islanders are cut off from the outside world and are under constant video surveillance. To survive in the villa, the islanders must be in a relationship with another islander. The Islanders couple up for the first time on first impressions but will later "re-couple" at special ceremonies where they can choose to remain with their current partners or to switch partners. At the villa, the couples must share a bed for sleeping and are permitted to talk with other Islanders at any time, allowing them to get to know everyone. While in the villa, each Islander has their own telephone, with which they can contact other Islanders via text and can receive text messages informing them of the latest challenges, dates, dumpings, and re-couplings. While the Islanders might appear to have unmediated access to the outside world, they are limited in both their alcohol consumption and communication with the outside world.

The Love Islanders are presented with many games and challenges that are designed to test their physical and mental abilities, after which the winners are sometimes presented with special prizes, such as a night at the Hideaway or a special date.

Islanders can be eliminated, or "dumped," for several reasons; these include remaining single after a re-coupling and by public vote through the Love Island mobile app. During the show's final week, members of the public vote to decide which couple should win the series; the couple who receive the most votes win.

At the envelope ceremony on finale night, the couple who received the highest number of votes from the public is given two envelopes: one for each partner. One envelope contains $100,000 while the other is empty. The partner with the $100,000 envelope may choose whether to share the money with his or her partner as a test of trust and commitment.

== Islanders ==
The original islanders of the seventh season of Love Island USA. Left to right: Taylor, Yulissa, Olandria, Nic, Chelley, Jeremiah, Belle-A, Ace, Huda and Austin

The original islanders were announced on May 29, 2025.

Yulissa Escobar was removed from the villa on Day 3 after videos surfaced online of her using racial slurs. Cierra Ortega was also removed from the villa on Day 26 after Instagram stories resurfaced online of her using racial slurs.

Zak Srakaew, a Casa Amor bombshell, previously appeared on season 20 of Big Brother UK.

Islander	Age	Hometown	Entered	Exited	Status	Ref
Amaya Espinal	25	New York City, New York	Day 5	Day 32	Winner	
Bryan Arenales	27	Boston, Massachusetts	Day 17	Day 32	Winner	
Nicolas “Nic” Vansteenberghe	24	Jacksonville, Florida	Day 1	Day 32	Runner-up	
Olandria Carthen	27	Decatur, Alabama	Day 1	Day 32	Runner-up	
Chris Seeley	27	Fresno, California	Day 17	Day 32	Third place	
Huda Mustafa	24	Raleigh, North Carolina	Day 1	Day 32	Third place	
Iris Kendall	25	Los Angeles, California	Day 9	Day 32	Fourth place	
Jose "Pepe" Garcia-Gonzalez	27	Santa Ana, California	Day 9	Day 32	Fourth place	
Allen "Ace" Greene	22	Los Angeles, California	Day 1	Day 30	Dumped	
Michelle "Chelley" Bissainthe	27	Orlando, Florida	Day 1	Day 30	Dumped	
Clarke Carraway	24	Charlotte, North Carolina	Day 17	Day 28	Dumped	
Taylor Williams	25	Oklahoma City, Oklahoma	Day 1	Day 28	Dumped	
Elan Bibas	24	Toronto, Ontario, Canada	Day 17	Day 26	Dumped	
Zak Srakaew	29	Roi Et, Thailand / Manchester, United Kingdom (Note: Zak Srakaew is originally from Roi Et, Thailand but was residing in New York City, New York at the time of casting and filming.)	Day 17	Day 26	Dumped	
Cierra Ortega	25	Phoenix, Arizona	Day 2	Day 26	Removed	
Andreina Santos-Marte	24	Jersey City, New Jersey	Day 14	Day 24	Dumped	
Austin Shepard	26	Northville, Michigan	Day 1	Day 24	Dumped	
Gracyn Blackmore	25	Bristol, Virginia	Day 17	Day 24	Dumped	
Jaden Duggar	25	Seattle, Washington	Day 17	Day 24	Dumped	
Thomas "TJ" Palma	23	Pleasantville, New York	Day 14	Day 24	Dumped	
Courtney "Coco" Watson	24	Los Angeles, California	Day 17	Day 20	Dumped	
JD Dodard	23	Dallas, Texas	Day 17	Day 20	Dumped	
Savanna "Vanna" Einerson	21	Salt Lake City, Utah	Day 17	Day 20	Dumped	
Zachary "Zac" Woodworth	26	Portland, Oregon	Day 17	Day 20	Dumped	
Jeremiah Brown	25	Seattle, Washington	Day 1	Day 16	Dumped	
Hannah Fields	23	Tucson, Arizona	Day 5	Day 16	Dumped	
Jalen Brown	27	Sparta, Georgia	Day 9	Day 13	Dumped	
Charlie Georgiou	27	Birmingham, England, United Kingdom	Day 2	Day 11	Dumped	
Isabelle-Anne "Belle-A" Walker	22	Gold Beach, Oregon	Day 1	Day 6	Dumped	
Yulissa Escobar	27	Miami, Florida	Day 1	Day 3	Removed	

=== Future appearances ===
In 2025, Andreina Santos-Marte, Charlie Georgiou and Chris Seeley all competed on season two of Love Island Games.

In 2026, Zac Woodworth returned for the third series of Love Island: All Stars. Santos-Marte, Georgiou and Seeley appeared on season two of Love Island: Beyond the Villa alongside Amaya Espinal, Belle-A Walker, Bryan Arenales, Clarke Carraway, Coco Watson, Gracyn Blackmore, Hannah Fields, Iris Kendall, Jeremiah Brown, Pepe Garcia-Gonzalez, Taylor Williams and TJ Palma Austin Shepard and Nic Vansteenberghe both made guest appearances. Vansteenberghe is set to compete on the second season of Destination X. Elan Bibas is set to compete on the fourth season of The Traitors Canada.

== Production ==
On November 23, 2023, Peacock renewed Love Island: USA for both season six and seven. Ariana Madix returned as host for her second season, with Iain Stirling once again providing narration. Love Island Australia host Sophie Monk joined as the new host of Love Island USA: Aftersun, though Maura Higgins returned as host for the last episode. Season two finalist Cely Vazquez returned as social media ambassador alongside Love Island Australia contestant Callum Hole, who brought all the behind-the-scenes gossip and interviews. Eyal Booker filled in as the Aftersun host for one episode, while Paige DeSorbo and Megan Thee Stallion made a special appearance in the villa to host a competition each. On June 13, 2025, it was announced that there would be a reunion which aired on August 25 and Love Island Games would air on September 16 on Peacock, hosted by Madix and Andy Cohen.

== Coupling and elimination history ==
	Week 1			Week 2			Week 3				Week 4			Week 5		
	Day 1	Day 3	Day 6	Day 11	Day 13		Day 16	Day 17	Day 18	Day 20	Day 24	Day 26	Day 28	Day 30	Final	
Bryan	Not in Villa							Andreina		Andreina	Jaden to save	Amaya	Safe	Finalist	Split the 100k	Winner (Day 32)
Amaya	Not in Villa		Ace	Charlie to dump	Austin	Huda to save	Vulnerable	Single	Zak	Zak	Andreina to save	Bryan	Safe	Finalist	Winner (Day 32)	
Nic	Belle-A	Cierra	Cierra	Huda to dump	Cierra	Jalen to save	Safe	Clarke	Olandria	Cierra	Taylor to save	Olandria	Safe	Finalist	Runner-up (Day 32)	
Olandria	Taylor		Taylor	Jalen	Taylor	Huda to save	Safe	Zak	Nic	Single	Austin to save	Nic	Safe	Finalist	Runner-up (Day 32)	
Chris	Not in Villa							Chelley		Huda	Jaden to save	Huda	Safe	Finalist	Third place (Day 32)	
Huda	Jeremiah		Jeremiah	Vulnerable	Single	Vulnerable	Safe	JD		Chris	Andreina to save	Chris	Safe	Finalist	Third place (Day 32)	
Iris	Not in Villa			Jeremiah	Jeremiah	Huda to save	Vulnerable	Zac		TJ	TJ to save	Pepe	Safe	Finalist	Fourth place (Day 32)	
Pepe	Not in Villa			Hannah	Hannah	Jalen to save	Vulnerable	Gracyn		Gracyn	Taylor to save	Iris	Safe	Finalist	Fourth place (Day 32)	
Ace	Yulissa	Single	Amaya	Huda to dump	Chelley	Huda to save	Safe	Vanna	Coco	Chelley	Taylor to save	Chelley	Safe	Eliminated	Dumped (Day 30)	
Chelley	Austin		Austin	Charlie to dump	Ace	Huda to save	Safe	Chris		Ace	Andreina to save	Ace	Safe	Eliminated	Dumped (Day 30)	
Clarke	Not in Villa							Nic	Taylor	Taylor	Taylor to save	Taylor	Eliminated	Dumped (Day 28)		
Taylor	Olandria		Olandria	Vulnerable	Olandria	Huda to save	Safe	Coco	Clarke	Clarke	Vulnerable	Clarke	Eliminated	Dumped (Day 28)		
Elan	Not in Villa							Cierra		Single	Gracyn to save	Single	Dumped (Day 26)			
Zak	Not in Villa							Olandria	Amaya	Amaya	TJ to save	Single	Dumped (Day 26)			
Cierra	Not in Villa	Nic	Nic	Charlie to dump	Nic	Huda to save	Safe	Elan		Nic	Taylor to save	Removed (Day 26)				
Andreina	Not in Villa						Immune	Bryan		Bryan	Vulnerable	Dumped (Day 24)				
Austin	Chelley		Chelley	Taylor to dump	Amaya	Jalen to save	Vulnerable	Jaden		Jaden	Vulnerable	Dumped (Day 24)				
Gracyn	Not in Villa							Pepe		Pepe	Vulnerable	Dumped (Day 24)				
Jaden	Not in Villa							Austin		Austin	Vulnerable	Dumped (Day 24)				
TJ	Not in Villa						Immune	Single	Vanna	Iris	Vulnerable	Dumped (Day 24)				
Coco	Not in Villa							Taylor	Ace	Single	Dumped (Day 20)					
JD	Not in Villa							Huda		Single	Dumped (Day 20)					
Vanna	Not in Villa							Ace	TJ	Single	Dumped (Day 20)					
Zac	Not in Villa							Iris		Single	Dumped (Day 20)					
Hannah	Not in Villa		Charlie	Pepe	Pepe	Huda to save	Vulnerable	Dumped (Day 16)								
Jeremiah	Huda		Huda	Iris	Iris	Jalen to save	Vulnerable	Dumped (Day 16)								
Jalen	Not in Villa			Olandria	Single	Vulnerable	Dumped (Day 13)									
Charlie	Not in Villa	Single	Hannah	Vulnerable	Dumped (Day 11)											
Belle-A	Nic	Single		Dumped (Day 6)												
Yulissa	Ace	Removed (Day 3)														
Notes	none	1	none	2	3	4	5	6		7	8	none	9	10	11	
Removed	none	Yulissa	none									Cierra	none			
Dumped	No; Dumping		Belle-A; Failed to couple up	Charlie; 3 of 6 votes to dump	No; Dumping	Jalen; 4 of 12 votes to save	Hannah; Girls' choice to dump	No; Dumping		Coco, JD, Vanna, Zac; Islanders’ choice to dump	Andreina, Austin, Gracyn, Jaden, TJ; Islanders’ choice to dump	Elan, Zak; Failed to couple up	Clarke & Taylor; America's choice to dump	Ace & Chelley; America's choice to dump	Iris & Pepe; Fewest votes to win	
Dumped	No; Dumping		Belle-A; Failed to couple up	Charlie; 3 of 6 votes to dump	No; Dumping	Jalen; 4 of 12 votes to save	Hannah; Girls' choice to dump	No; Dumping		Coco, JD, Vanna, Zac; Islanders’ choice to dump	Andreina, Austin, Gracyn, Jaden, TJ; Islanders’ choice to dump	Elan, Zak; Failed to couple up	Clarke & Taylor; America's choice to dump	Ace & Chelley; America's choice to dump	Chris & Huda; Third–most votes to win	
Dumped	No; Dumping		Belle-A; Failed to couple up	Charlie; 3 of 6 votes to dump	No; Dumping	Jalen; 4 of 12 votes to save	Jeremiah; Boys’ choice to dump	No; Dumping		Coco, JD, Vanna, Zac; Islanders’ choice to dump	Andreina, Austin, Gracyn, Jaden, TJ; Islanders’ choice to dump	Elan, Zak; Failed to couple up	Clarke & Taylor; America's choice to dump	Ace & Chelley; America's choice to dump	Nic & Olandria; Second–most votes to win	
Dumped	No; Dumping		Belle-A; Failed to couple up	Charlie; 3 of 6 votes to dump	No; Dumping	Jalen; 4 of 12 votes to save	Jeremiah; Boys’ choice to dump	No; Dumping		Coco, JD, Vanna, Zac; Islanders’ choice to dump	Andreina, Austin, Gracyn, Jaden, TJ; Islanders’ choice to dump	Elan, Zak; Failed to couple up	Clarke & Taylor; America's choice to dump	Ace & Chelley; America's choice to dump	Amaya & Bryan; Most votes to win	

=== Notes ===
- ^Note 1: Charlie and Cierra entered the Villa after the initial coupling and had to recouple with one of the islanders who offered to be their partner on Day 3. Yulissa was removed from the Villa, leaving Ace single. As no girl volunteered to recouple with Charlie, he remained single. Ace (by default), Austin, Nic & Taylor volunteered leaving their couple to be considered for the recoupling. Cierra decided to steal Nic, leaving Belle-A single.
- ^Note 2: America voted for which Islanders the new bombshells should couple up with. America chose Jalen to couple up with Olandria, Pepe to couple up with Hannah and Iris to couple up with Jeremiah. This left Taylor, Charlie, and Huda single and vulnerable. The non-recoupled Islanders then had to choose one of them to be dumped. Charlie received the most votes, dumping him from the Villa.
- ^Note 3: On Day 13, all the Islanders made their coupling decisions privately. The girls went behind a closed door, and afterward, the boys chose who they wanted to couple up with. Any girl who did not have her door opened, as well as any boy who was locked out, would remain single and vulnerable.
- ^Note 4: The safe couples had to stand behind the vulnerable islander they wanted to save. The islander who received the fewest votes would be dumped. Jalen received the fewest votes, dumping him from the Villa.
- ^Note 5: America voted for their favorite islanders. The top four girls and the top three boys who received the most votes were granted safety. As new islanders, Andreina and TJ were exempt from the vote. The four safe girls then had to decide which vulnerable girl to dump, choosing Hannah, and the three safe boys had to decide which vulnerable boy to dump, choosing Jeremiah.
- ^Note 6: As the first part for the Casa Amor twist in week 3, Casa Amor and the Villa held two separate initial coupling ceremonies with their new islanders. After the initial couplings, Amaya and TJ were single and vulnerable. On Day 18, any new islander could choose to recouple with an original islander. Zak volunteered leaving Olandria to couple up with Amaya, Vanna volunteered leaving Ace to couple up with TJ, Coco volunteered leaving Taylor to couple with Ace, and Clarke volunteered leaving Nic to couple up with Taylor, leaving Olandria and Nic single and vulnerable. Nic and Olandria were sent on a secret date where they faced a choice: they could either remain single and leave the island or couple up together and return to the main Villa. They decided to couple up and return to the main Villa.
- ^Note 7: As the final part for the Casa Amor twist in week 3, Casa Amor and the Villa held a joint re-coupling ceremony. Both islanders had to choose one another to officially become a couple. Coco, Elan, JD, Olandria, Vanna and Zac were not mutually chosen to be in a couple and remained single and vulnerable. The Casa Amor islanders then had to choose one boy to save and the main Villa islanders had to choose one girl to save. The islanders chose Elan and Olandria to save, leaving Coco, JD, Vanna and Zac dumped from the Villa.
- ^Note 8: America voted for their favorite islanders. The top girls and the top boys who received the most votes were granted safety, while the bottom girls and the bottom boys were vulnerable and at risk to be dumped. The safe islanders had to stand behind the islander they wanted to save. Taylor received the most votes to stay which meant Andreina, Austin, Gracyn, Jaden, and TJ were dumped from the Villa.
- ^Note 9: America voted for their favorite couples. The couple who received the least votes, Clarke and Taylor, was dumped from the Villa.
- ^Note 10: America voted for the couples they wanted to see in the finale. Each couple read from a notecard that confirmed their spot in the final round. Chelley and Ace received a notecard notifying them that their journey had come to an end, meaning they were dumped from the island.
- ^Note 11: America voted for which couple they think should win Love Island. The couple with the most votes, Amaya and Bryan, were declared the winner of 'Love Island' and received the grand prize money.

== Episodes ==
No. overall	No. in season	Title	Day(s)	Original release date	Prod. code
Week 1
198	1	"Episode 1"	Days 1–2	June 3, 2025	701
199	2	"Episode 2"	Days 2–3	June 4, 2025	702
200	3	"Episode 3"	Days 3–4	June 5, 2025	703
201	4	"Episode 4"	Days 4–5	June 6, 2025	704
202	5	"Episode 5: Aftersun"	N/A (Note: This episode showcased events from the previous days in the week. No new or present days were featured.)	June 7, 2025	705
203	6	"Episode 6"	Days 5–6	June 8, 2025	706
204	7	"Episode 7"	Days 6–7	June 9, 2025	707
Week 2
205	8	"Episode 8"	Days 7–8	June 10, 2025	708
206	9	"Episode 9"	Days 8–9	June 12, 2025	709
207	10	"Episode 10"	Days 9–10	June 13, 2025	710
208	11	"Episode 11: Aftersun"	N/A	June 14, 2025	711
209	12	"Episode 12"	Days 10–11	June 15, 2025	712
210	13	"Episode 13"	Days 11–12	June 16, 2025	713
211	14	"Episode 14"	Days 12–13	June 17, 2025	714
212	15	"Episode 15"	Days 13–14	June 19, 2025	715
Week 3
213	16	"Episode 16"	Days 14–15	June 20, 2025	716
214	17	"Episode 17: Aftersun"	N/A	June 21, 2025	717
215	18	"Episode 18"	Days 15–16	June 22, 2025	718
216	19	"Episode 19"	Days 16–17	June 23, 2025	719
217	20	"Episode 20"	Days 17–18	June 24, 2025	720
218	21	"Episode 21"	Days 18–19	June 26, 2025	721
219	22	"Episode 22"	Days 19–20	June 27, 2025	722
220	23	"Episode 23: Aftersun"	N/A	June 28, 2025	723
221	24	"Episode 24"	Days 20–21	June 29, 2025	724
Week 4
222	25	"Episode 25"	Days 21–22	June 30, 2025	725
223	26	"Episode 26"	Days 22–23	July 1, 2025	726
224	27	"Episode 27"	Days 23–24	July 3, 2025	727
225	28	"Episode 28"	Days 24–25	July 4, 2025	728
226	29	"Episode 29: Aftersun"	N/A	July 5, 2025	729
227	30	"Episode 30"	Days 25–26	July 6, 2025	730
228	31	"Episode 31"	Days 26–27	July 7, 2025	731
229	32	"Episode 32"	Days 27–28	July 8, 2025	732
Week 5
230	33	"Episode 33"	Days 28–29	July 10, 2025	733
231	34	"Episode 34"	Days 29–30	July 11, 2025	734
232	35	"Episode 35: Aftersun"	N/A	July 12, 2025	735
233	36	"Episode 36"	Days 30–32	July 13, 2025	736
Special
234	37	"Episode 37: Reunion"	N/A	August 25, 2025	737

== Reception ==
The seventh season of Love Island USA, which premiered on Peacock on June 3, 2025, achieved significant viewership success and generated considerable discussion, though its critical reception has been mixed. Early figures from Nielsen Media Research indicated that the season ranked as the No. 2 most-watched streaming original program and the No. 1 most-watched streaming reality series for the week of June 9, 2025. The premiere episode's average audience quadrupled since its debut, and the season's most-watched day occurred on June 23, 2025, with the introduction of the Casa Amor twist. Additionally, Luminate streaming data reported 1.2 billion minutes viewed across the first nine available episodes, making it the second most-watched streaming show on television. The season also demonstrated strong digital engagement, generating 54 million social interactions across platforms and over 623 million video views on TikTok, a 232% increase from the previous season. New viewers constituted 39% of the audience, and nearly 30% of all viewing occurred on mobile devices, making it Peacock's biggest mobile audience for an entertainment series to date.

Despite strong viewership, critical and audience reception has been mixed. While the premiere was noted for its "steamy new twists" and "bold choices," with some suggesting the show was "back, and better than ever," concerns were raised about the new cast living up to the previous season's success. As the season progressed, some critics described it as "turning into the worst yet," citing overt producer involvement in villa dumpings and recouplings, which led to suspicions of rigged fan votes to keep "drama-delivering" contestants over those forming genuine connections.
