= Olandria =

American model and television personality (born 1998)

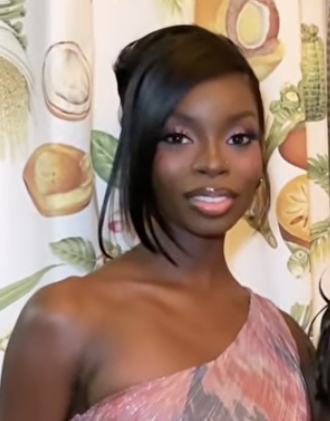
- Born: Olandria Lashae Carthen; May 29, 1998 (age 28); Decatur, Alabama
- Education: Tuskegee University
- Occupations: Model; influencer; television personality
- Years active: 2025–present

Olandria Lashae Carthen (born May 29, 1998) is an American model, influencer, and television personality. She appeared on the seventh season of Love Island USA in 2025, where she finished as a runner-up.

== Early life and education ==
Olandria was born on May 29, 1998, in Decatur, Alabama. She is the eldest sibling of two younger sisters and three younger brothers.

She attended Tuskegee University, initially studying computer science before graduating with a bachelor's degree in logistics, materials and supply chain management. Olandria later worked as an elevator saleswoman.

== Career ==
On May 29, 2025, Olandria was announced as a contestant on the seventh season of Love Island USA. She finished as the runner-up alongside Nic Vansteenberghe. The two were referred to by fans as "Nicolandria" and described by CNN as "a cultural phenomenon".

Following her appearance on Love Island USA, Olandria signed with United Talent Agency and gained millions of followers across social media platforms. She obtained partnerships with multiple brands, including NYX Cosmetics, and appeared in campaigns for Reebok and UGG. She also served as the face of Barbie's "You Can Be Any Barbie" campaign at Coachella and Poppi's 2026 summer campaign. Ad Age named her one of the top five breakout creators of 2025, and she was included in Cosmopolitan's Z-Stars Class of 2025.

In September 2025, Olandria made her runway debut at the Sergio Hudson Spring/Summer 2026 show during New York Fashion Week.

She partnered with Microsoft Copilot to highlight the history of historically Black colleges and universities (HBCUs).

In November 2025, Olandria won the EBONY People's Choice Award at the 2025 EBONY Power 100 Gala and appeared on the cover of the magazine's 2025 Power Issue. She was named to Time 100 Creators, The Root 100, Adweek's Creative 100, and included in the 2025 Revolt Power List.

In December 2025, Olandria was featured on Glamour's holiday cover alongside Vansteenberghe. She appeared on the digital cover of Harper's Bazaar Vietnam, marking her first solo magazine cover, and she made her Sports Illustrated Swimsuit debut in the magazine's 2026 issue.

In May 2026, Olandria collaborated with Brandon Blackwood on her first-ever fashion collection. The three designer bags, each inscribed with her signature, were launched on May 27.

In June 2026, Cosmopolitan published a profile on Olandria. She also appeared on the cover of Rolling Stone Africa's Afrodescendant Issue on Juneteenth 2026, and the cover story highlighted her philanthropic work with students in Nigeria.

In November 2026, Olandria appeared on the winter cover of FASHION and the digital cover of Byrdie.

== Personal life ==
Olandria is a first-generation college graduate of Tuskegee University.

Olandria and Nic Vansteenberghe ended their relationship as of July 2026, a year after meeting on Love Island USA.

== Filmography ==
Television
Year	Title	Notes	Refs.
2025	Love Island USA	Season 7; runner-up	

== Accolades ==
=== Awards and nominations ===
Year	Award	Category	Role	Result	Refs.
2025	EBONY Power 100	People's Choice Award	Herself	Won	
2025	Fortune & Forks	Visibility with Vision Award	Herself	Won	
2025	Femme it Forward	Give Her FlowHERS: Self-Love Award	Herself	Won	
2025	Harvard Undergraduate Women in Business	WIB Power and Purpose Award	Herself	Won	
2025	Model of the Year Awards	Content Creator of the Year (Reader's Choice)	Herself	Won	
2025	Hello Beautiful	2025 Beauty of the Year	Herself	Won	
2026	Las Culturistas Culture Awards	Yess!!! Award for Girl We Learned About This Year (And Loved)	Herself	Won	

=== Listicles ===
Year	Publisher	Listicle	Refs.
2025	Cosmopolitan	Z-Stars Class of 2025	
2025	Cosmopolitan	Best New Couple	
2025	The Root	The Root 100	
2025	EBONY	Top 25 Moments of 2025	
2025	Ad Age	Top 5 Breakout Creators of 2025	
2025	Vanity Fair	Best Performances of 2025	
2025	Revolt	26 Best-Dressed Celebrities of 2025	
2025	Revolt	2025 Power List	
2026	Adweek	2026 Creative 100	
2026	Create & Cultivate	2026 Create & Cultivate 100	
2026	Time	TIME100 Creators 2026	
