= Arielle Vandenberg =

American actress, television host and model

- Born: Los Angeles, California, U.S.
- Occupations: Actress; television presenter; model
- Height: 5 ft 9 in (175 cm)
- Spouse: Matt Cutshall (m. 2023)

Arielle Vandenberg is an American actress, television presenter, and model. She is best known for being one of Vine’s breakout stars, and for being original host of Love Island USA. She is the current host of HGTV’s House Shock.

Vandenberg is the founder of the cosmetics line Rel Beauty.

== Early life ==
Vandenberg is an only child who was born in Los Angeles. She was raised in Fallbrook, California, and graduated from Fallbrook Union High School. She studied ballet, tap, and jazz dancing at the age of 5, and later became involved in community theater.

== Career ==
=== Television and film ===
Vandenberg has starred in movies such as Nerve, The Ugly Truth, Spring Breakdown, Epic Movie, Dog Days and Airplane Mode.

Vandenberg had a recurring guest role in Greek as Lisa Lawson, and guest-starred in the first two seasons of Meet the Browns as London Sheraton. She has had guest-starring roles in other television series including How I Met Your Mother, Bones, CSI: Miami, NCIS: Los Angeles, Friends with Benefits, For Better or Worse, and Numbers.

In July 2019, Vandenberg was the host of the reality show Love Island USA on CBS. She hosted three seasons, until the show was acquired by Peacock and was restructured with actress Sarah Hyland as the new host.

Vandenberg has had various brand partnerships and starred in television commercials for brands including Mercedes-Benz, Coca-Cola Zero, State Farm Insurance, and Progressive Auto Insurance.

In September 2026, she was announced as the host of HGTV’s house renovation show House Shock.

=== Social media ===
Vandenberg shot to popularity on Twitter's video service Vine for her comedy sketches. She amassed a large following and transitioned her audience to other platforms after the app’s closure in 2017.

=== Business ventures ===
In 2022, Vandenberg launched Rel Beauty, a clean cosmetics line.

== Personal life ==
Vandenberg was linked to singer Adam Levine in 2010 and pro snowboarder Shaun White in 2011. From 2011 to 2014, Vandenberg was in a relationship with Arctic Monkeys frontman Alex Turner. She was starred in their "R U Mine?" music video. In 2015, Vandenberg dated actor Will Arnett.

In 2017, Vandenberg began a relationship with long-time friend and frequent Vine collaborator, Matt Cutshall, whom she had known since 2011. They became engaged in September 2019 and married in May 21, 2023, at their friend Jason Kennedy’s home. The couple reside in Los Angeles, California.

== Filmography ==
Television
| Year | Title | Role | Notes |
|---|---|---|---|
| 2006 | She Said/He Said | Gorgeous Girl | TV movie |
| 2006 | CSI: Crime Scene Investigation | Party Girl | Season 7, Episode 1: "Built to Kill: Part 1" |
| 2007 | CSI: Miami | Jessica Taylor | Season 6, Episode 4: "Bang, Bang, Your Debt" |
| 2007–2011 | Greek | Lisa Lawson/The Hot Girl | Season 1, Episode 1: "Pilot" (credited as The Hot Girl), Season 1, Episode 3: "The Rusty Nail" (credited as Lisa Lawson), Season 2, Episode 9: "Three's a Crowd" (credited as Lisa Lawson), & Season 4, Episode 10: "Legacy" (credited as Lisa Lawson) |
| 2008 | How I Met Your Mother | Mary | Season 3, Episode 12: "No Tomorrow" |
| 2009 | Bones | Model | Season 4, Episode 19: "The Science in the Physicist" |
| 2009 | Numbers | Lorrelle | Season 6, Episode 4: "Where Credit's Due" |
| 2009–2010 | Meet the Browns | London Sheraton | 20 episodes |
| 2011 | Friends with Benefits | Lana | Season 1, Episode 8: "The Benefit of Mentors" |
| 2012 | For Better or Worse | Candace | Season 2, Episode 30: "Who Gets the Friends" |
| 2012 | Go On | Female Jogger | Season 1, Episode 10: "Back, Back, Back... It's Gone" |
| 2013 | Date Night Fails | Date | TV miniseries |
| 2015 | Battle Creek | Milt's Assistant | Season 1, Episode 1: "The Battle Creek Way" |
| 2015 | 2015 MTV Video Music Awards | Herself | TV special |
| 2015 | The Honest Show | Ms. Bright | Season 1, Episode 5: "Honest History Report" |
| 2015 | Awkwardness | Herself/5 Year Old Arielle/Arielle's Mom | Writer of Season 1, Episode 1: "Arielle Vandenberg Blows Mom's Big Date" (with Chris from Bad Ads) |
| 2016 | Car Star | Herself | 10 minute Game show |
| 2016 | Hollywood Today Live | Herself | Season 3, Episode 30: "Guest Co-Hosts Ali Landry & Dondre Whitfield/Dr. Drew Pinsky/Arielle Vanderberg/Diana Nyad" |
| 2016 | The Earliest Show | Janice Crawl | Episode: "Anger" |
| 2016–2017 | @midnight | Herself | Episodes: 485; November 16, 2016: "James Davis/Arielle Vandenberg/Dan Levy" & 530; March 6, 2017 "Arielle Vandenberg/Flula Borg/Steve Agee/Justin Long" |
| 2017 | Good Mythical Morning | Herself | Episode: "Arielle Vandenberg, ASMR & More!" |
| 2017 | Ryan Hansen Solves Crimes on Television | Hostess (Jillian) | Episode: "Joel McHale Is: Ryan Hansen" |
| 2018 | Lonely and Horny | Charlotte | Episode: "A Tale of Two Evenings" |
| 2018 | MMI: Charity Celebrity Bowling Tournament | Herself | TV miniseries |
| 2019–2021 | Love Island | Host | 56 episodes |
| 2019 | Celebrity Page | Herself | Archive footage |
| 2019 | Inside Edition | Herself | Episode: "Actress Joins Army" |
| 2019 | NCIS: Los Angeles | Mara | Episode: "Answers" |
| 2019–present | The Talk | Herself | Episodes: "Howie Mandel/Arielle Vandenberg" & "Debbie Matenopoulos/Victor Cruz/Jamie Camil/Arielle Vandenberg" |
| 2020 | Lights Out with David Spade | Herself | 2 episodes |
| 2020 | Entertainment Tonight | Herself | 1 episode |
| 2022 | Nightly Pop | Herself | 2 episodes |
| TBD | Untitled Arielle Vandenberg/Cara Santana Project | Arielle | In Development |

Film
| Year | Film | Role | Notes |
|---|---|---|---|
| 2007 | Epic Movie | Cribs Faun | —N/a |
| 2009 | Spring Breakdown | Freshman Girl | —N/a |
| 2009 | The Ugly Truth | Candi | —N/a |
| 2009 | Dark Moon Rising | Nicole | —N/a |
| 2010 | Drop Dead Gorgeous | Sabrina | Direct-to-DVD |
| 2010 | The Extraordinary Fight of Atticus Walker and the Monster in His Mind | Rachel | Short film |
| 2012 | The Golden Age | Francesca | Short film |
| 2015 | Dole Garden Soup: Vine in the Aisle | Woman | Video short |
| 2015 | Bad Roomies | April | —N/a |
| 2016 | Nerve | Bergdorf Sales Lady | —N/a |
| 2018 | Dog Days | Kristen | —N/a |
| 2019 | Airplane Mode | Clarice | —N/a |
| 2023 | Young, Sexy & Dead | Sabrina | —N/a |
