= Amaya Espinal =

American television personality (born 1999)

- Born: Amaya Elizabeth Espinal; November 9, 1999 (age 26); New York City, New York
- Other name: Amaya Papaya
- Education: Midwood High School; LIU Brooklyn
- Occupation: Cardiac registered nurse
- Known for: Love Island USA

Amaya Elizabeth Espinal (born November 9, 1999), also known as Amaya Papaya, is an American reality television personality. She appeared on the Peacock reality show Love Island USA in 2025, winning the season alongside Bryan Arenales. They are the first Latino couple to win in the franchise's history.

== Early life and education ==
Espinal was born on November 9, 1999 in New York City. She is of Dominican descent, and is a first-generation American.

She became a licensed cardiac registered nurse in December 2021 and worked at a hospital in New York prior to her appearance on Love Island.

== Career ==
Espinal entered the Love Island villa in episode 4 of the seventh season. She became known for her "iconic quotes," and is regarded as a fan favorite.

Her impromptu singing became popular among fans. One song with the lyrics "I never said I was perfect, I never said I didn't have any flaws" was featured in over 22,000 TikTok videos as of June 2025. In July 2025, when users searched "Amaya Papaya" on Google, the lyrics appeared in an animated banner accompanied by papaya emojis.

Other remarks such as "God forbid I'm a sensitive gangsta" and "I’m just not your cup of tea to be drinkin', so don't f—ing drink it" were also widely quoted by fans.

She coupled up with Bryan Arenales and eventually won the seventh season. In August 2025, Espinal announced via social media that she and Arenales were no longer a couple.

In July 2025, Espinal signed with Gersh and Untitled Entertainment for representation in all areas.

== Credits ==
=== Television ===
Year	Title	Notes	Refs.
2025	Love Island USA	Winner; Season 7	

=== Podcast ===
Year	Title	Role	Notes	Refs.
2025	Call Her Daddy	Herself	Guest	
