= Harbin =

Capital of Heilongjiang, China

Harbin 哈尔滨市 Ha'erbin, Haerhpin
- Prefecture-level and sub-provincial city
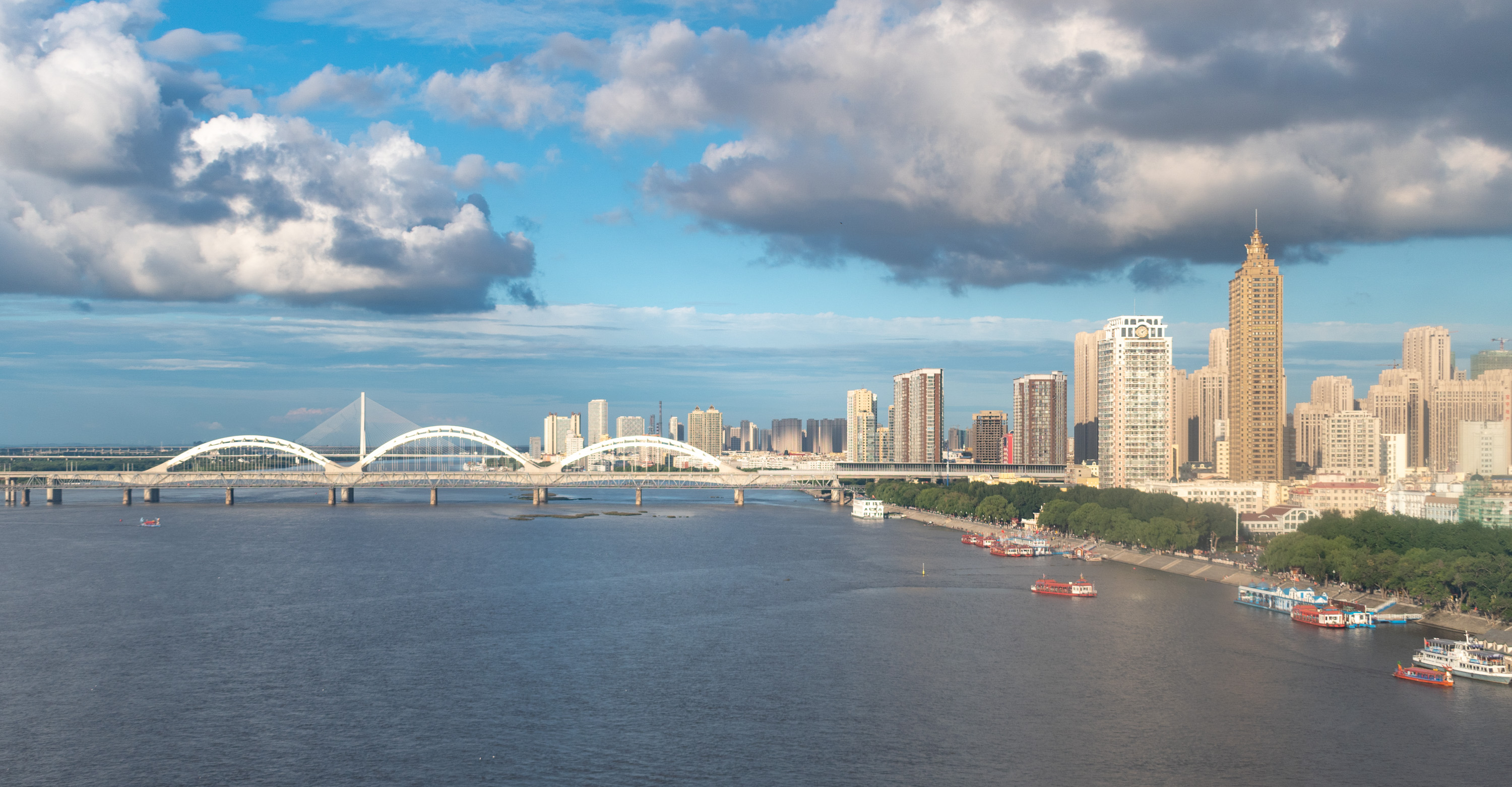
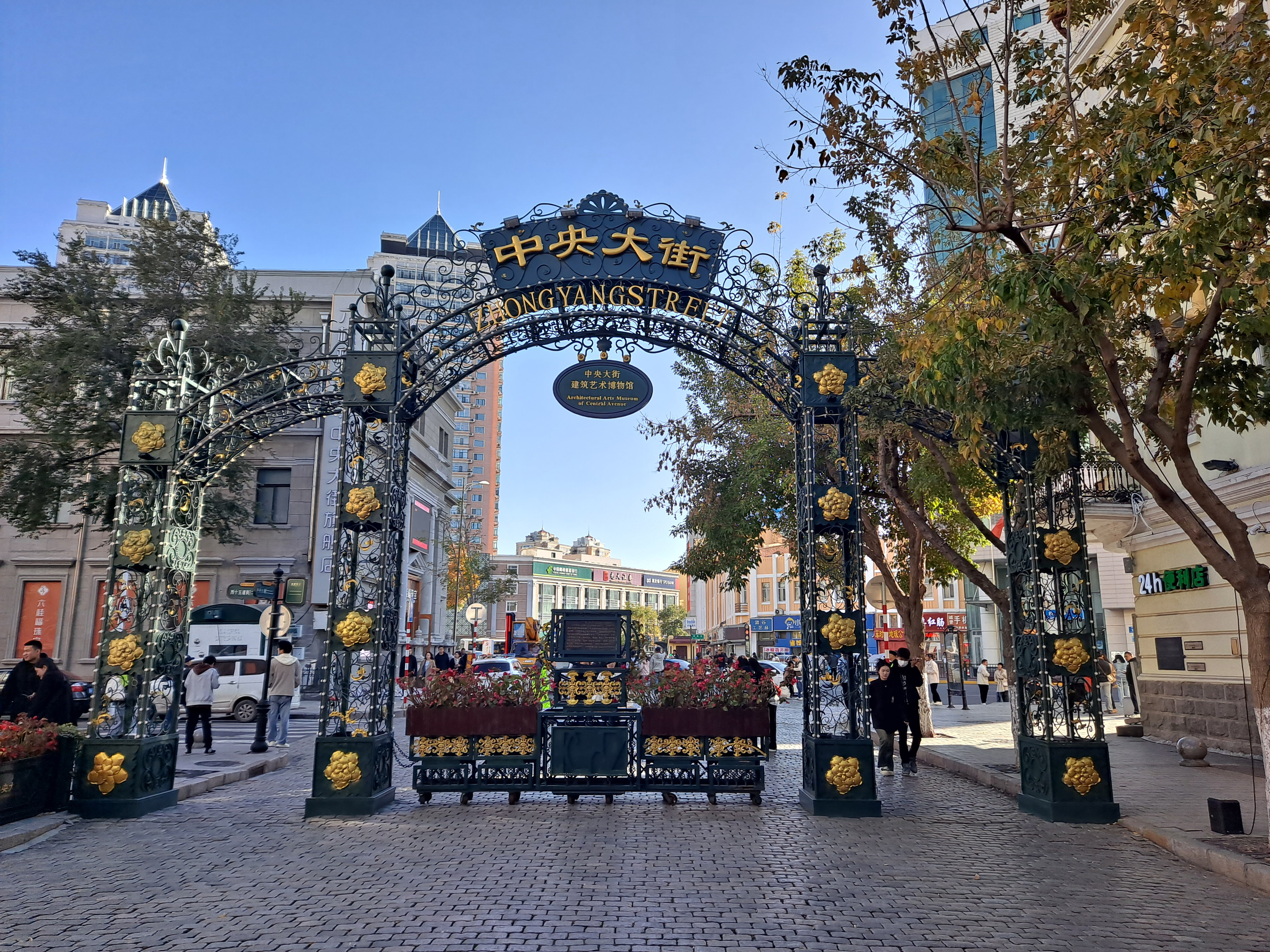
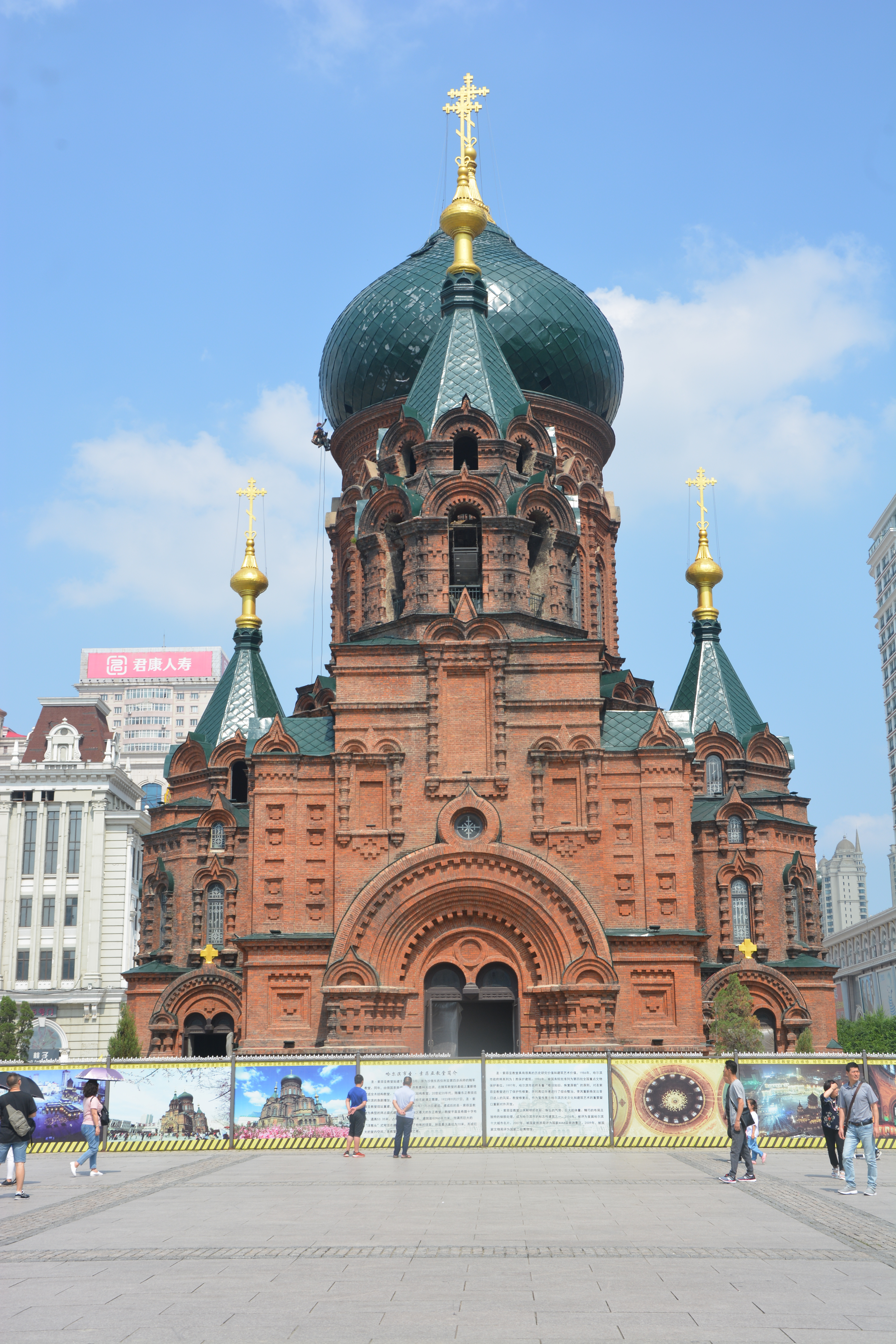
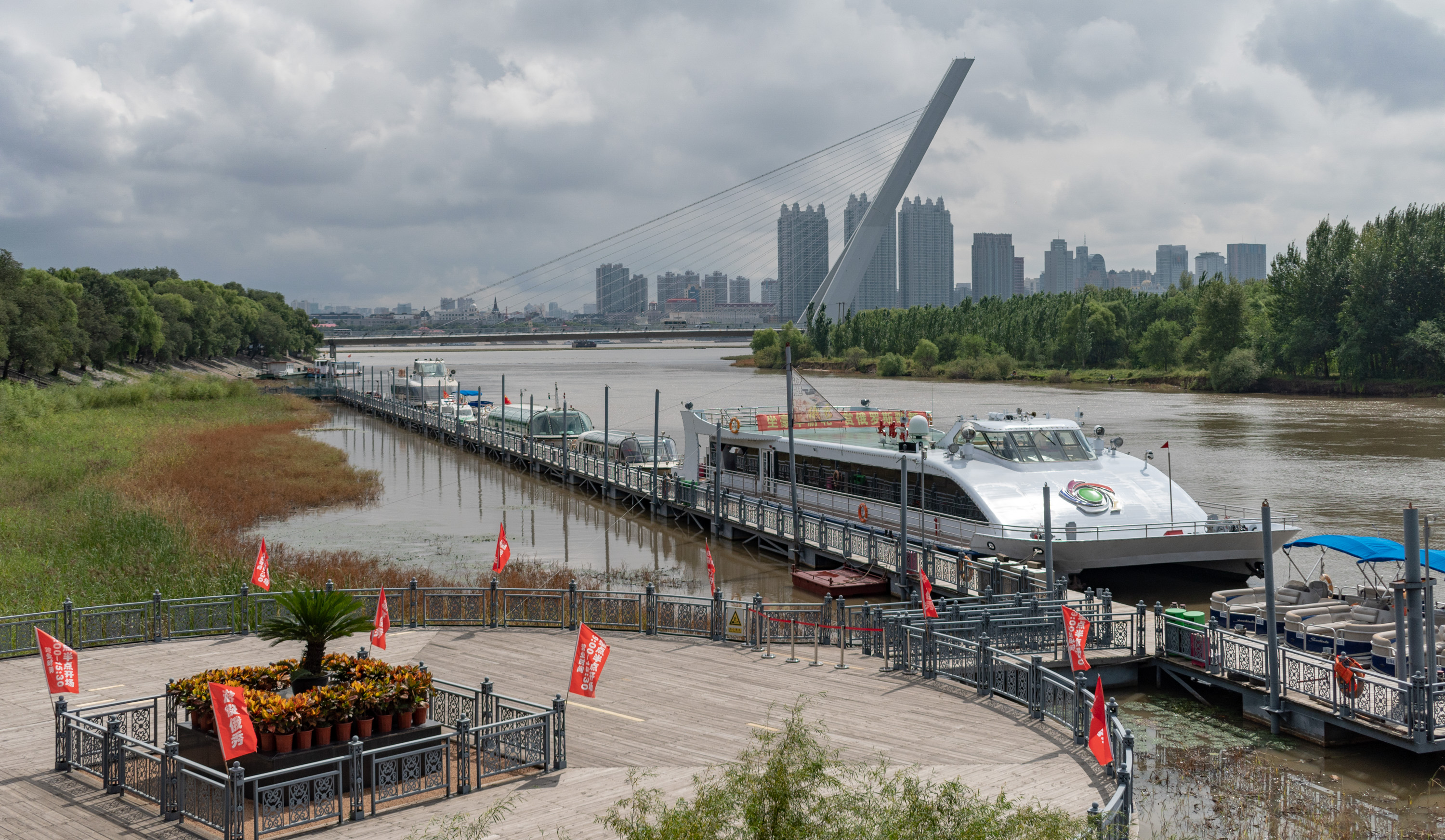
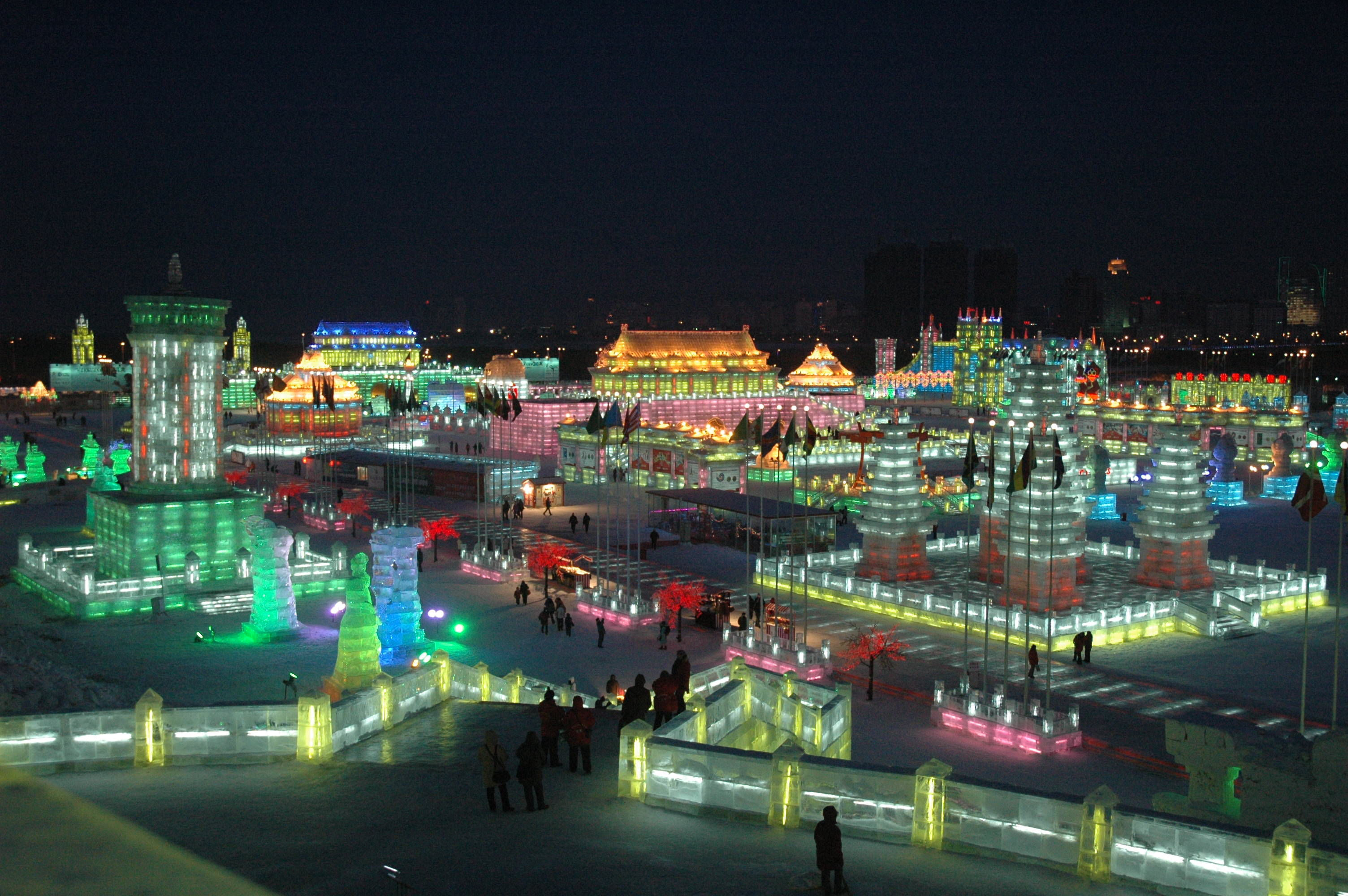
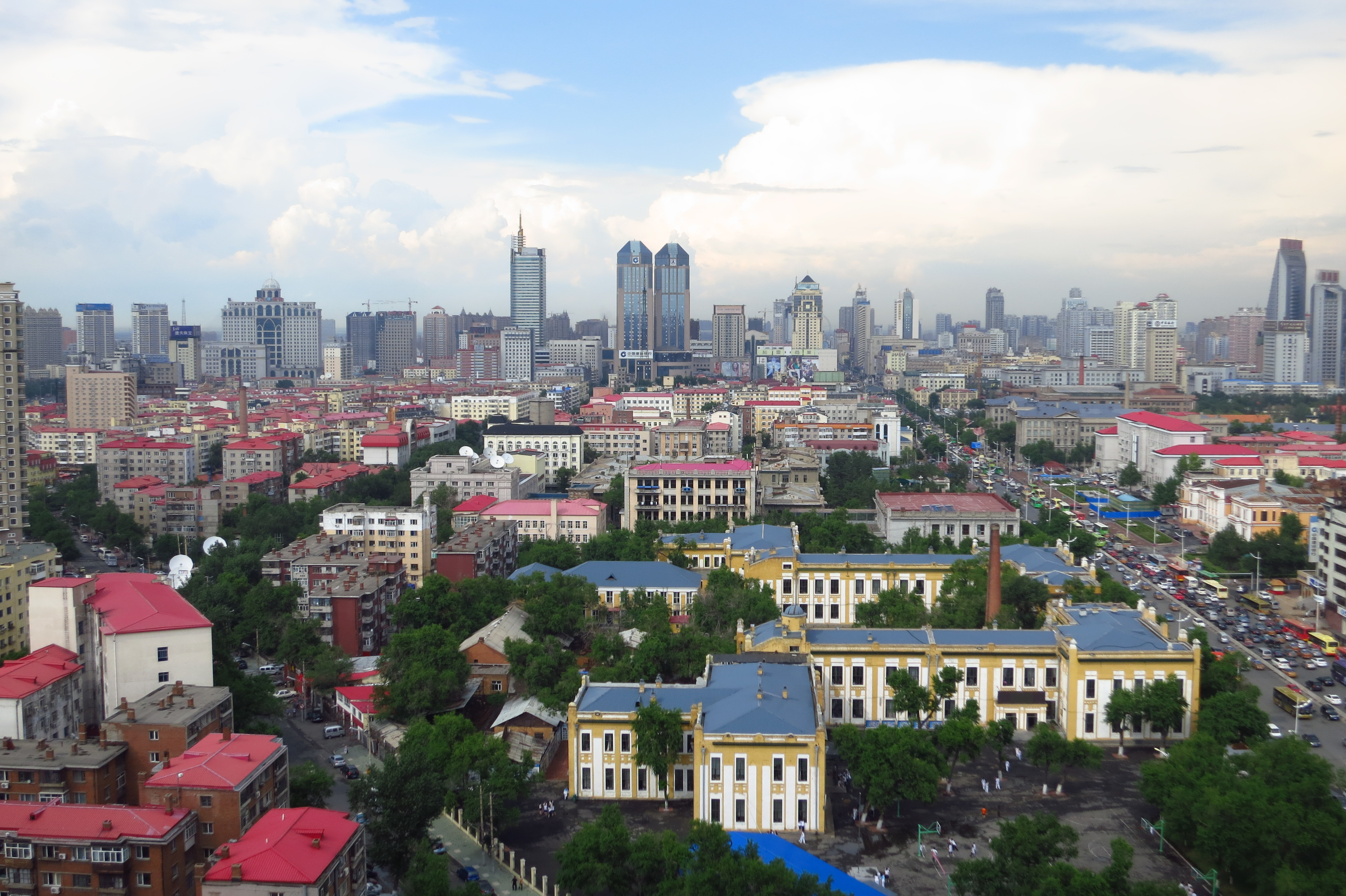
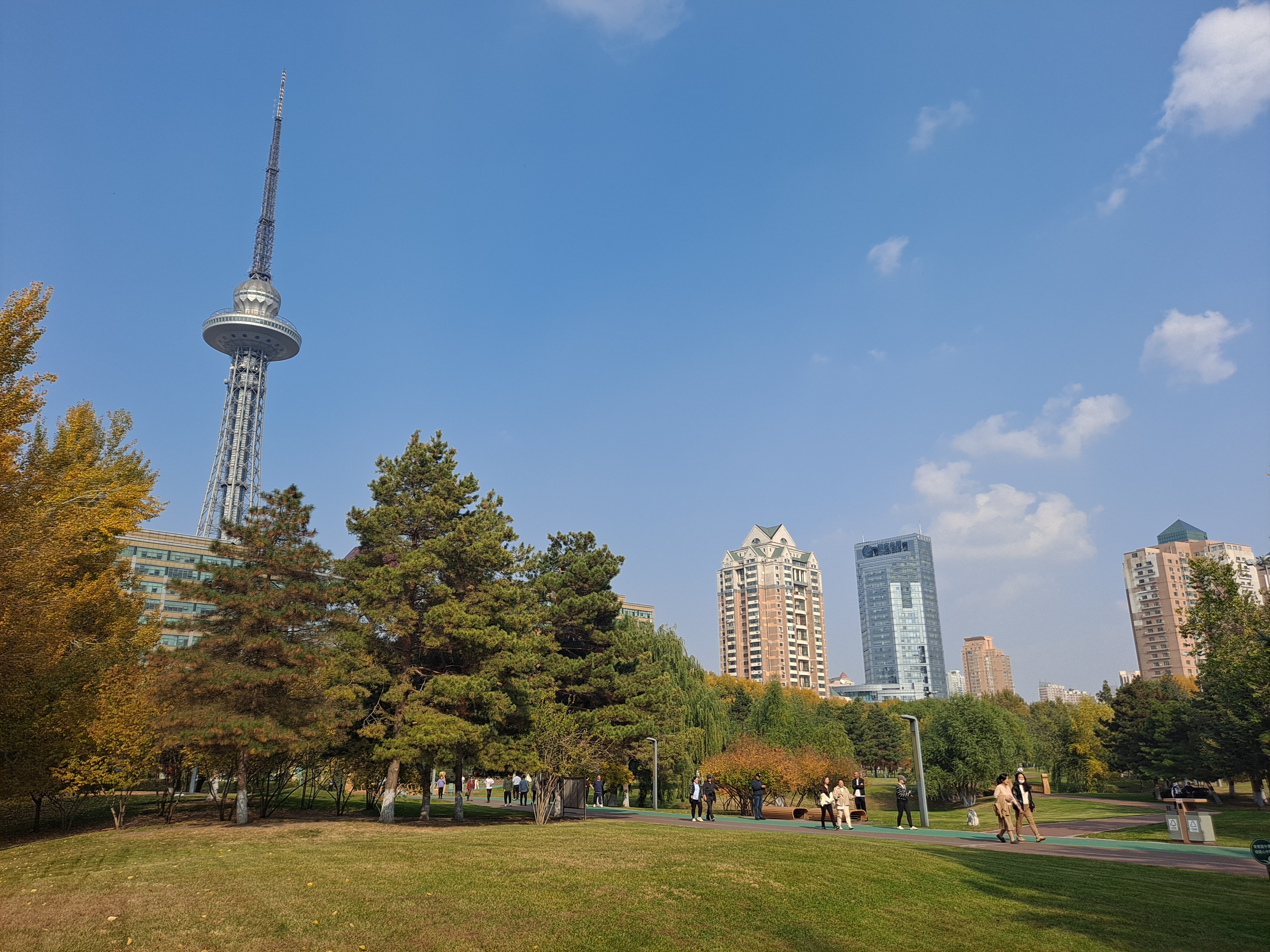
- Songhua River Central Street Saint Sophia Cathedral Sun Island Harbin Ice and Snow World Nan'gang District Dragon Tower
- Nicknames: Ice City, Oriental Paris, Oriental Moscow, The pearl on the swan's neck
- Interactive map of Harbin
- Location of the city center in Heilongjiang Harbin (China)
- Coordinates (Heilongjiang Provincial Museum): 45°45′27″N 126°38′27″E
- Country: China
- Province: Heilongjiang
- County-level divisions: 18 divisions, including 9 urban districts, 2 County-level cities, and 7 counties
- Settled: before 1115
- Incorporated: Town: 1898
- County: 31 October 1905
- Municipality: 5 February 1921
- Municipal seat: Songbei District

Government
  - Type: Sub-provincial city
  - Body: Harbin Municipal People's Congress
  - CCP Secretary: Yu Hongtao
  - Mayor: Wang Hesheng

Area
  - City: 53,068 km^{2} (20,490 sq mi)
  - Urban: 2,454.5 km^{2} (947.7 sq mi)
  - Metro: 10,204.8 km^{2} (3,940.1 sq mi)
- Elevation: 150 m (490 ft)

Population (2020 census)
  - City: 10,009,854
  - Density: 188.62/km^{2} (488.53/sq mi)
  - Urban: 6,976,136
  - Urban density: 2,842.2/km^{2} (7,361.2/sq mi)
  - Metro: 5,841,929
  - Metro density: 572.469/km^{2} (1,482.69/sq mi)
- Demonym(s): Harbinite, Harbinese

GDP
  - City: CN¥ 575.1 billion US$ 92.3 billion
  - Per capita: CN¥ 59,027; US$ 9,477
- Time zone: UTC+08:00 (China Standard)
- Postal code: 150000
- Area code: 451
- ISO 3166 code: CN-HL-01
- License plate prefixes: 黑A, 黑L
- Climate: Dwa
- City flowers: Lilac
- Website: harbin.gov.cn

Harbin
- "Harbin" in Simplified Chinese (top), Traditional Chinese (middle), and Manchu (bottom) characters

Chinese name
- Simplified Chinese: 哈尔滨
- Traditional Chinese: 哈爾濱
- Hanyu Pinyin: Hā'ěrbīn
- Literal meaning: (Manchu) "Place of drying fishnets" or (Jurchen language) "Swan"
Transcriptions
Standard Mandarin
- Hanyu Pinyin: Hā'ěrbīn
- Bopomofo: ㄏㄚ ㄦˇ ㄅㄧㄣ
- Gwoyeu Romatzyh: Ha'eelbin
- Wade–Giles: Ha^{1}-êrh^{3}-pin^{1}
- Yale Romanization: Hā-Ěr-Bīn
- IPA: [xá.àɚpín]
Yue: Cantonese
- Jyutping: Haa1ji5ban1

Manchu name
- Manchu script: ᡥᠠᠯᠪᡳᠨ
- Romanization: Halbin

Russian name
- Russian: Харби́н
- Romanization: Kharbin

Harbin (Note: /hɑːrˈbɪn, hɑːrˈbiːn/ har-BIN, har-BEEN; Manchu: ᡥᠠᠯᠪᡳᠨ, romanized: Halbin, IPA: [χalpin]; simplified Chinese: 哈尔滨; traditional Chinese: 哈爾濱; pinyin: Hā'ěrbīn; IPA: [xá.àɚpín].) or Hā'ěrbīn is the capital and largest city of Heilongjiang, China, and the second largest urban population (after Shenyang, Liaoning province) and the largest metropolitan population (urban and rural regions together) in Northeast China. Harbin has direct jurisdiction over nine metropolitan districts, two county-level cities, and seven counties. It is the eighth most populous Chinese city according to the 2020 census. The built-up area of Harbin (which consists of all districts except Shuangcheng and Acheng) has 5,841,929 inhabitants, while the total metropolitan population is 10,009,854, making it one of the 100 largest urban areas in the world. Harbin serves as a key political, economic, scientific, cultural, and communications hub in Northeast China, as well as an important industrial base of the nation.

Several different etymologies have been offered for the city's name. The city government says the name means "swan" in the Jurchen language, and other sources say that it comes from a Manchu word meaning "a place for drying fishing nets". The settlement grew from a small rural fishing village on the Songhua River to become one of the largest cities in Northeast China. Founded in 1898 with the coming of the Russian-built Chinese Eastern Railway, the city first prospered as a settlement inhabited by an overwhelming majority of immigrants from the Russian Empire. In the 1920s the city was considered China's fashion capital, since new designs from Paris and Moscow reached here first before arriving in Shanghai. From 1932 until 1945, Harbin was the largest city in the Japanese puppet state of Manchukuo. Well known for its historical Russian legacy and architecture, the city is famed for its European influence and serves as an important gateway in Sino-Russian trade today.

Harbin is one of the top 50 cities and metropolitan areas in the world by scientific research output. The city hosts several major universities in Northeast China, including Harbin Engineering University, Harbin Medical University, Northeast Agricultural University, Harbin University of Science and Technology, Harbin Normal University, Northeast Forestry University, and Heilongjiang University. Notably, Harbin Institute of Technology is consistently ranked as one of the best universities in the world for engineering.

Harbin was voted "China Top Tourist City" by the China National Tourism Administration in 2004. Though known for its bitterly cold seasons, Harbin is heralded as the Ice City (冰城) for its winter tourism and recreations, especially the ice sculpture festival. The city has hosted the 1996 Winter Asian Games, the 2009 Winter Universiade, and the 2025 Asian Winter Games.

== History ==
=== Early history ===
Human settlement in the Harbin area dates from at least 2200 BC during the late Stone Age. Wanyan Aguda, the founder and first emperor (reigned 1115–1123) of the Jin dynasty (1115–1234), was born of the Jurchen Wanyan tribes who resided near the Ashi River in this region. In AD 1115 Aguda established Jin's capital, Shangjing Huiningfu (Upper Capital, Huining Prefecture), in today's Acheng District of Harbin. After Aguda's death, the succeeding emperor Wanyang Sheng ordered the construction of a new city with a uniform plan. The planning and construction emulated major Chinese cities, in particular Bianjing (Kaifeng), although the Jin capital was smaller than its Northern Song prototype. Huining Prefecture served as the first superior capital of the Jin Empire until Wanyan Liang (the fourth emperor of the Jin Dynasty) moved the capital to Yanjing (now Beijing) in 1153. Liang even went to destroy all palaces in the former capital in 1157. Wanyan Liang's successor Wanyan Yong (Emperor Shizong) restored the city and established it as a secondary capital in 1173. Ruins of the Shangjing Huining Prefecture were discovered and excavated about 2 km (1.2 mi) from present-day Acheng's central urban area. The site of the old Jin capital ruins is a national historic reserve and includes the Jin Dynasty History Museum. The public museum was renovated in late 2005. Mounted statues of Aguda and of his chief commander Wanyan Zonghan (also Nianhan) stand on the grounds of the museum. Many of the artifacts found there are on display in nearby Harbin.

After the Mongol conquest of the Jin Empire (1211–1234), Huining Prefecture was abandoned. In the 17th century, the Manchus used building materials from Huining Prefecture to construct their new stronghold in Alchuka. The region of Harbin remained largely rural until the 19th century, by the end of which over ten villages and about 30,000 people arrived in the city's present-day urban districts.

=== International city ===
This small village in 1898 grew into the modern city of Harbin. Polish engineer Adam Szydłowski drew plans for the city following the construction of the Chinese Eastern Railway, which the Russian Empire had financed. The Russians selected Harbin as the base of their administration over this railway and the Chinese Eastern Railway Zone. The railways were largely constructed by Russian engineers and indentured workers. The Chinese Eastern Railway extended the Trans-Siberian Railway, substantially reducing the distance from Chita to Vladivostok and also linking the new port city of Dalny (Dalian) and the Russian naval base of Port Arthur (Lüshun). The settlement founded by the Russian-owned Chinese Eastern Railway quickly turned into a boomtown, growing into a city within five years. In addition to the Russians, other Russian-speaking settlers in Harbin came from all over the Russian Empire, including Ukrainians, Poles, Jews, Georgians, and Tatars, eventually making Harbin a Russian town, with the majority coming from the south of European Russia.

The city was intended as a showcase for Russian imperialism in Asia, and the American scholar Simon Karlinsky, who was born in Harbin in 1924 to a Russian-Jewish family, wrote that in Harbin "the buildings, boulevards, and parks were planned—well before the October Revolution—by distinguished Russian architects and also by Swiss and Italian town planners", giving the city a very European appearance. Starting in the late 19th century, a mass influx of Han Chinese arrived and, taking advantage of the rich soils, founded farms that soon turned Manchuria into the "breadbasket of China". Others went to work in the mines and factories, making the northeast one of the first regions of China to industrialize. Harbin became one of the main points from which food and industrial products were shipped out of Manchuria. A sign of Harbin's wealth was the theatre that was established during its first decade. In 1907 the play K zvezdam by Leonid Andreyev premiered there.

During the Russo-Japanese War (1904–05), Russia used Harbin as its base for military operations in Manchuria. Following Russia's defeat, its influence declined. Several thousand nationals from 33 countries, including the United States, Germany, and France, moved to Harbin. Sixteen countries established consulates to serve their nationals, who established several hundred industrial, commercial, and banking companies. Churches were rebuilt for Russian Orthodox, Lutheran/German Protestant, and Polish Catholic Christians. Chinese capitalists also established businesses, especially in brewing, food, and textiles, making Harbin the economic hub of northeastern China and an international metropolis.

The rapid growth of the city challenged the public healthcare system. The worst-ever recorded outbreak of pneumonic plague spread to Harbin through the Trans-Manchurian railway from the border trade port of Manzhouli. The plague lasted from late autumn of 1910 to spring 1911 and killed 1,500 Harbin residents (mostly ethnic Chinese), or about five percent of its population at the time. This turned out to be the beginning of the large so-called Manchurian plague epidemic, which ultimately claimed 60,000 victims. In the winter of 1910, Dr. Wu Lien-teh (later the founder of Harbin Medical University) was given instructions from the Foreign Office in Peking (Beijing) to travel to Harbin to investigate the plague. Dr. Wu asked for imperial sanction to cremate plague victims, which became the turning point for the epidemic. The suppression of this plague pandemic changed medical progress in China. Bronze statues of Dr. Wu Lien-teh were built at Harbin Medical University to commemorate his contributions in promoting public health, preventive medicine, and medical education.

The first generation of Harbin Russians was composed of the railroad builders and employees who had moved to Harbin to work for the Chinese Eastern Railway. At the time Harbin was not yet an established city, having been almost built from scratch by the early settlers. Houses were constructed, furniture and personal items were brought in from Russia. After the Manchurian plague epidemic, Harbin's population continued to increase sharply, especially within the Chinese Eastern Railway Zone. In 1913 the Chinese Eastern Railway census showed its ethnic composition as: Russians – 34,313, Chinese (including Hans, Manchus, etc.) – 23,537, Jews – 5,032, Poles – 2556, Japanese – 696, Germans – 564, Tatars – 234, Latvians – 218, Georgians – 183, Estonians – 172, Lithuanians – 142, Armenians – 124; there were also Karaims, Ukrainians, Bashkirs, and some Western Europeans. In total, there were 68,549 citizens of 53 nationalities, speaking 45 languages. Research shows that only 11.5 percent of all residents were born in Harbin. By 1917, Harbin's population exceeded 100,000, with over 40,000 of them being ethnic Russians.

Immediately after the February Revolution of 1917, the Harbin Soviet was organized. It sought to seize control over the Chinese Eastern Railway and to defend Russian citizens in Manchuria. The Bolshevik Martemyan Ryutin was the chairman of the Harbin Soviet.

After Russia's Great October Socialist Revolution in November 1917, the new Soviet government in Russia recognized the Harbin Soviet as its representation in Manchuria and placed Russian citizens in Manchuria under its protection. Subsequently, the Harbin Soviet requested recognition of the local taotai. On 12 December 1917, Bolsheviks seized control over the Harbin Soviet, pressuring Mensheviks and Socialist-Revolutionaries to leave the body. Through Golos Truda the Harbin Soviet declared itself as the government of the area. On 18 December 1917, the Harbin Soviet dismissed the Chinese Eastern Railway administrator Dmitry Horvat and directed its militia to seize control of the railway installations. The Bolshevik militia was soon confronted by Chinese troops and Horvat loyalists, who disarmed and deported some 1,560 Bolshevik fighters. Ryutin went underground.

In 1920 more than 100,000 defeated Russian White Guards and refugees retreated to Harbin, which became a major center of White Russian émigrés and the largest Russian community outside the Soviet Union. Karlinsky noted that a major difference with the Russian émigrés who arrived in Harbin was: "Unlike the Russian émigrés who went to Paris or Prague or even to Shanghai, the new residents of Harbin were not a minority surrounded by a foreign population. They found themselves instead in an almost totally Russian city, populated mainly by people with roots in the south of European Russia." The city had a Russian school system, as well as publishers of Russian-language newspapers and journals. The Russian Harbintsy (Note: "Harbintsy" is the Russian word for "people of Harbin", cf. Berliners, New Yorkers, Muscovites. It applies to any nationality, not just Russians. While the paper focuses on Russian Harbintsy, many of their experiences were shared by Russians living elsewhere in "Russian Manchuria".) community numbered around 120,000 at its peak in the early 1920s. Many of Harbin's Russians were wealthy, which sometimes confused foreign visitors who expected them to be poor, with for instance the American writer Harry A. Franck in his 1923 book, Wanderings in North China, writing the Russian "ladies as well gowned as at the Paris races [who] strolled with men faultlessly garbed by European standards", leading him to wonder how they had achieved this "deceptive appearance".

The Harbin Institute of Technology was established in 1920 as the Harbin Sino-Russian School for Industry to educate railway engineers via a Russian method of instruction. Students could select from two majors at the time: Railway Construction or Electric Mechanic Engineering. On 2 April 1922, the school was renamed the Sino-Russian Industrial University. The original two majors eventually developed into two major departments: the Railway Construction Department and the Electric Engineering Department. Between 1925 and 1928 the university's rector was Leonid Ustrugov, the Russian Deputy Minister of Railways under Nicholas II before the Russian Revolution. He served as the Minister of Railways under Admiral Kolchak's government and was a key figure in the development of the Chinese Eastern Railway.

The Russian community in Harbin made it their mission to preserve the pre-revolutionary culture of Russia. The city had numerous Russian language newspapers, journals, libraries, theatres, and two opera companies. One of the famous Russian poets in Harbin was Valery Pereleshin, who started publishing his intensely homoerotic poetry in 1937 and was also one of the few Russian writers in Harbin who learned Mandarin. The subject of Pereleshin's poetry caused problems with the Russian Fascist Party and led Pereleshin to leave for Shanghai, and ultimately to Brazil. Not all of the Russian newspapers were of high quality, with Karlinsky calling Nash put', the newspaper of the Russian Fascist Party, "the lowest example of gutter journalism that Harbin had ever seen". Nikolai Baikov, another Russian writer, was known for his novels of exiled life in Harbin together with his accounts of his travels across Manchuria and the folklore of its Manchu and Chinese population. Boris Yulsky, a young Russian who published his short stories in the newspaper Rubezh, was considered to be a promising writer whose career was cut short when he gave up literature for activism in the Russian Fascist Party and a cocaine addiction. Moya-tvoya (mine–yours), a pidgin language that was a combination of Russian and Mandarin Chinese that had developed in the 19th century when Chinese went to work in Siberia, was considered essential by the Chinese businesspeople of Harbin.

In the early 1920s, according to Chinese scholars' recent studies, over 20,000 Jews lived in Harbin. After 1919, Dr. Abraham Kaufman played a leading role in Harbin's large Russian Jewish community. The Republic of China discontinued diplomatic relations with the Russian Republic in 1920, leaving many Russians stateless. When the Chinese Eastern Railway and government in Beijing announced in 1924 that they agreed the railroad would employ only Russian or Chinese nationals, the émigrés were forced to declare their ethnic and political allegiances. Most accepted Soviet citizenship.

The Chinese warlord Zhang Xueliang, the "Young Marshal", seized the Chinese Eastern Railway in 1929. The Soviet military force quickly put an end to the crisis and forced the Nationalist Chinese to accept the restoration of joint Soviet-Chinese administration of the railway.

=== Japanese invasion period ===
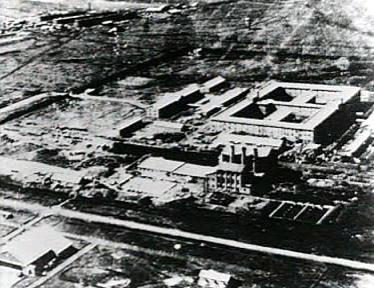
Headquarters of the Imperial Japanese Army's covert biological and chemical warfare research and development unit (Unit 731)

Japan invaded Manchuria outright after the Mukden Incident in September 1931. After the Japanese captured Qiqihar in the Jiangqiao Campaign, the Japanese 4th Mixed Brigade moved toward Harbin, closing in from the west and south. Bombing and strafing by Japanese aircraft forced the Chinese army to retreat, and within a few hours the Japanese occupation of Harbin was complete.

With the establishment of the puppet state of Manchukuo, the so-called "pacification of Manchukuo" began as volunteer armies continued to fight the Japanese. Harbin became a major operations base for the infamous medical experimenters of Unit 731, who killed people of all ages and ethnicities. These units were known collectively as the Epidemic Prevention and Water Purification Department of the Kwantung Army. The main facility of Unit 731 was built in 1935 at Pingfang District, approximately 24 km (15 mi) south of Harbin's urban area at that time. Between 3,000 and 12,000 citizens, including men, women, and children,—from which around 600 every year were provided by the Kempeitai—died during the human experiments conducted by Unit 731 at the camp based in Pingfang alone, which does not include victims from other medical experimentation sites. Almost 70 percent of the victims who died in the Pingfang camp were Chinese, including both civilians and military. Close to 30 percent of the victims were Russian. The Russian Fascist Party had the task of capturing "unreliable" Russians living in Harbin to hand over to Unit 731 to serve as the unwilling subjects of the gruesome experiments.

Some others were Southeast Asians and Pacific Islanders from the colonies of the Empire of Japan, and a small number were the prisoners of war from the Allies of World War II (although many more Allied POWs were victims at other unit sites). Prisoners of war were subjected to vivisection without anesthesia after being infected with various diseases. Other prisoners were inoculated with diseases, disguised as vaccinations, to study the effects. Unit 731 and its affiliated units (Unit 1644 and Unit 100 among others) were involved in research, development, and experimental deployment of epidemic-creating biowarfare weapons for assaults against the Chinese populace (both civilian and military) throughout World War II. Human targets were also used for testing flame throwers and grenades, placed at various distances and in different positions. Victims were also tied to stakes and used as targets to test germ-releasing bombs, chemical weapons, and explosive bombs.

Twelve Unit 731 members were found guilty in the Khabarovsk War Crime Trials but later repatriated. Others received secret immunity by the Supreme Commander of the Allied Powers, Douglas MacArthur, before the Tokyo War Crimes Tribunal in exchange for their biological warfare work in the Cold War for the American Forces.

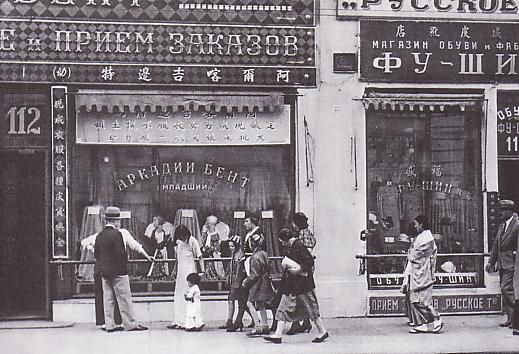
Three different nationalities – Chinese, Japanese and Russian – on Kitaiskaia Street

Chinese revolutionaries including Zhao Shangzhi, Yang Jingyu, Li Zhaolin, Zhao Yiman continued to struggle against the Japanese in Harbin and its administrative area, commanding the main anti-Japanese guerrilla army-Northeast Anti-Japanese United Army—which was originally organized by the Manchurian branch of the Chinese Communist Party (CCP). The army was supported by the Comintern after the CCP Manchurian Provincial Committee was dissolved in 1936.

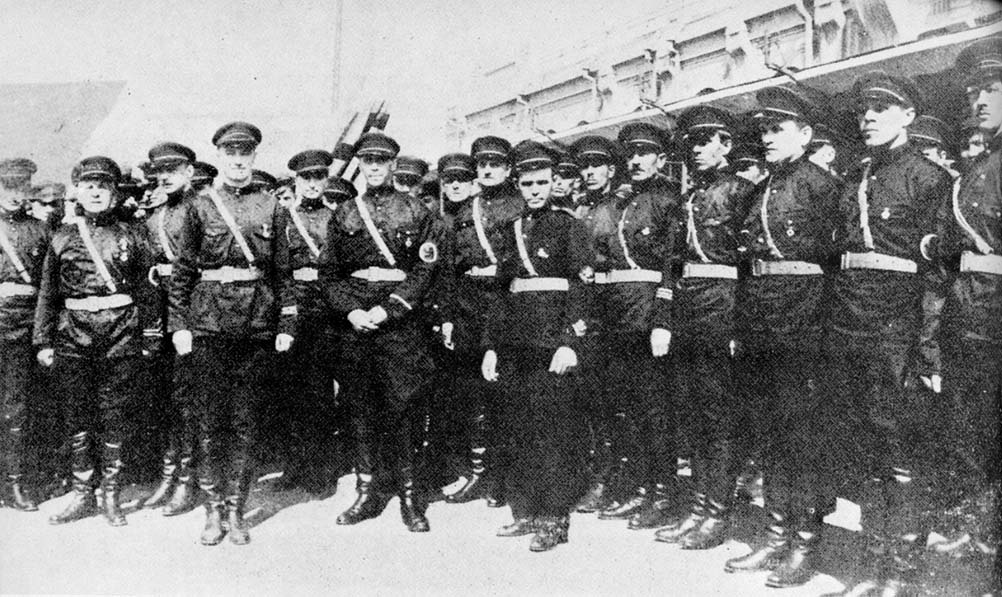
Anti–communist Russian Fascist Party Blackshirts, inspired by Italian Fascism, at Harbin Railway Station, 1934, waiting for arrival of their leader Konstantin Rodzaevsky

Under the Manchukuo régime and Japanese occupation, Harbin Russians had a difficult time. In 1935 the Soviet Union sold the Chinese Eastern Railway (KVZhD) to the Japanese, and many Russian émigrés left Harbin (48,133 of them were arrested during the Soviet Great Purge between 1936 and 1938 as "Japanese spies"). Most departing Russians returned to the Soviet Union, but a substantial number moved south to Shanghai or emigrated to the United States and Australia. By the end of the 1930s, the Russian population of Harbin had dropped to around 30,000.

Many of Harbin's Jews (13,000 in 1929) fled after the Japanese occupation, as the Japanese associated closely with militant anti-Soviet Russian Fascists, whose ideology of anti-Bolshevism and nationalism was laced with virulent anti-Semitism. The Kwantung Army-sponsored and financed the Russian Fascist Party, which after 1932 started to play an oversized role in Harbin's Russian community as its thugs began to harass and sometimes kill those opposed to it. Most Jews left for Shanghai, Tianjin, and the British Mandate of Palestine. In the late 1930s, some German Jews fleeing the Nazis moved to Harbin. Japanese officials later facilitated Jewish emigration to several cities in western Japan, notably Kobe, which came to have Japan's largest synagogue.

=== After World War II ===
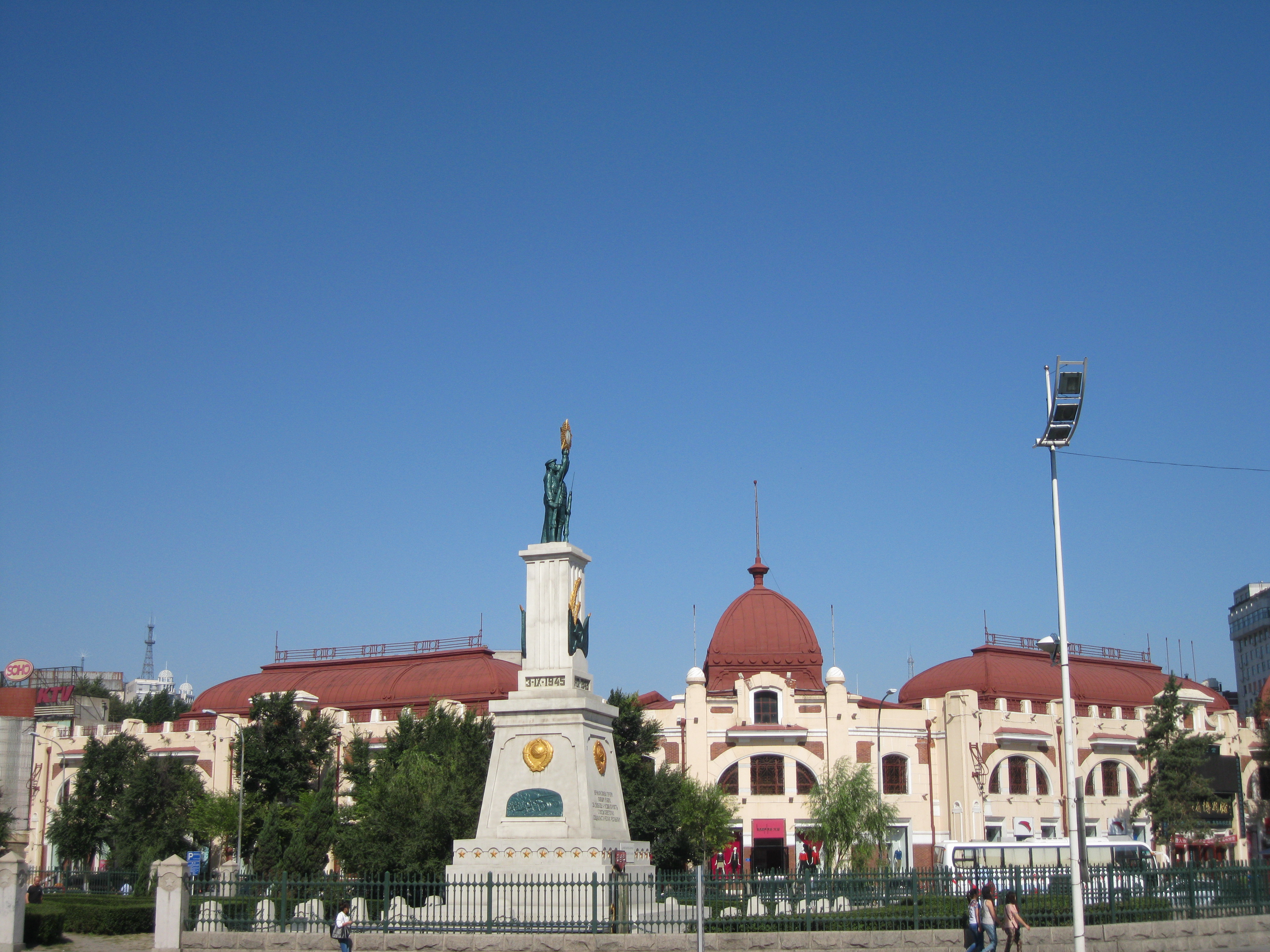
Monument to Soviet soldiers in Harbin's Nangang District, built by Soviet Red Army in 1945

The Soviet Army took the city on 20 August 1945 and Harbin never came under the control of the Nationalist Government, whose troops stopped 60 km (37 mi) short of the city. The city's administration was transferred by the departing Soviet Army to the Chinese People's Liberation Army in April 1946. On 28 April 1946, the communist government of Harbin was established, making the 700,000-citizen city the first large city governed by the communists. During the short occupation of Harbin by the Soviet Army (August 1945 to April 1946), thousands of Russian émigrés who had been identified as members of the Russian Fascist Party and had fled from communism after the Russian October Revolution were forcibly deported to the Soviet Union. After 1952, the Soviet Union launched a second wave of repatriation. By 1964, the Russian population in Harbin had been reduced to 450. The rest of the European community (Russians, Germans, Poles, Greeks, etc.) emigrated from 1950 to 1954 to Australia, Brazil, Canada, Israel, and the U.S. or were repatriated to their home countries. By 1988, the original Russian community numbered just thirty, all of them elderly. Modern Russians living in Harbin mostly moved there in the 1990s and 2000s and bear no relation to the previous generations.

Harbin was one of the key construction cities of China during the First Five-Year Plan period from 1951 to 1956. Thirteen of the 156 key construction projects were aid-constructed by the Soviet Union in Harbin. This project made Harbin an important industrial base of China. During the Great Leap Forward from 1958 to 1961, Harbin experienced a very tortuous development course as several Sino-Soviet contracts were cancelled by the Soviet Union. During the Cultural Revolution, many foreign and Christian architectures were demolished. On 23 August 1966, Red Guards stormed into St. Nicholas Cathedral and burned its icons on the streets while chanting xenophobic slogans before destroying the church. As the normal economic and social orders were seriously disrupted, Harbin's economy also suffered serious setbacks—the main reasons being the deteriorating Soviet ties and the escalation of the Vietnam War, which made China concerned of a possible nuclear attack. Mao Zedong ordered an evacuation of military and other key state enterprises from the northeastern frontier, with Harbin being the core zone of this region bordering the Soviet Union. During this Third Front Development era of China, several major factories of Harbin were relocated to southwestern provinces including Gansu, Sichuan, Hunan, and Guizhou, where they would be strategically secure in the event of a possible war. Some major universities of China were also moved out of Harbin, including Harbin Military Academy of Engineering (predecessor of Changsha's National University of Defense Technology) and Harbin Institute of Technology (moved to Chongqing in 1969 and relocated to Harbin in 1973).

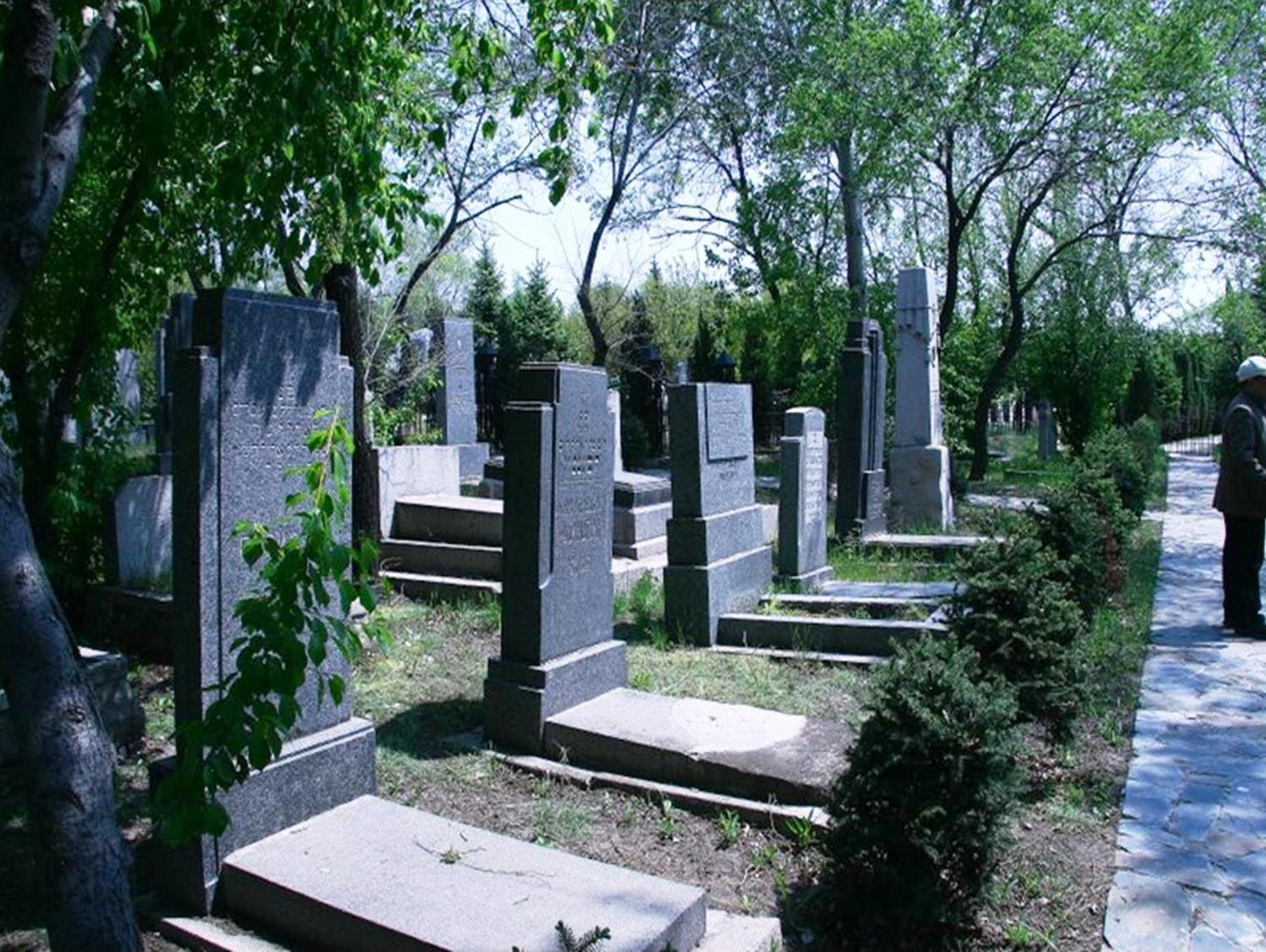
Huang Shan Jewish Cemetery of Harbin

National economy and social service have obtained significant achievements since the reform and opening up first introduced in 1979. Harbin holds the China Harbin International Economic and Trade Fair each year since 1990. Harbin once housed one of the largest Jewish communities in the Far East before World War II. It reached its peak in the mid-1920s when 25,000 European Jews lived in the city. Among them were the parents of Ehud Olmert, the former Prime Minister of Israel. In 2004, Olmert came to Harbin with an Israeli trade delegation to visit the grave of his grandfather in Huang Shan Jewish Cemetery, which had over 500 Jewish graves identified.

On 5 October 1984, Harbin was designated a sub-provincial city by the Organization Department of the CCP Central Committee. The eight counties of Harbin originally formed part of Songhuajiang Prefecture whose seat was practically located inside the urban area of Harbin since 1972. The prefecture was officially merged into Harbin city on 11 August 1996, increasing Harbin's total population to 9.47 million.

From late 1990s to early 2000s, Harbin, as a major industrial city with its high density of state-owned enterprises (SOEs), was disproportionately affected by the state government's push to close unprofitable industries. Mass layoffs from SOEs, widely known in China as Xiagang (下岗: step down from the post), had led to widespread unemployment, severe economic hardship and profound social disruption to the majority of city's residents.

Harbin hosted the third Asian Winter Games in 1996. In 2009, Harbin held the XXIV Winter Universiade.

A memorial hall honoring Korean nationalist and independence activist Ahn Jung-geun was unveiled at Harbin Railway Station on 19 January 2014. Ahn assassinated four-time Prime Minister of Japan and former Resident-General of Korea Itō Hirobumi at No.1 platform of Harbin Railway Station on 26 October 1909, as Korea on the verge of annexation by Japan after the signing of the Eulsa Treaty. South Korean President Park Geun-Hye raised an idea of erecting a monument for Ahn while meeting with Chinese Communist Party general secretary Xi Jinping during a visit to China in June 2013. After that China began to build a memorial hall honoring Ahn at Harbin Railway Station. As the hall was unveiled on 19 January 2014, the Japanese side soon lodged protest with China over the construction of Ahn's memorial hall.

== Geography ==
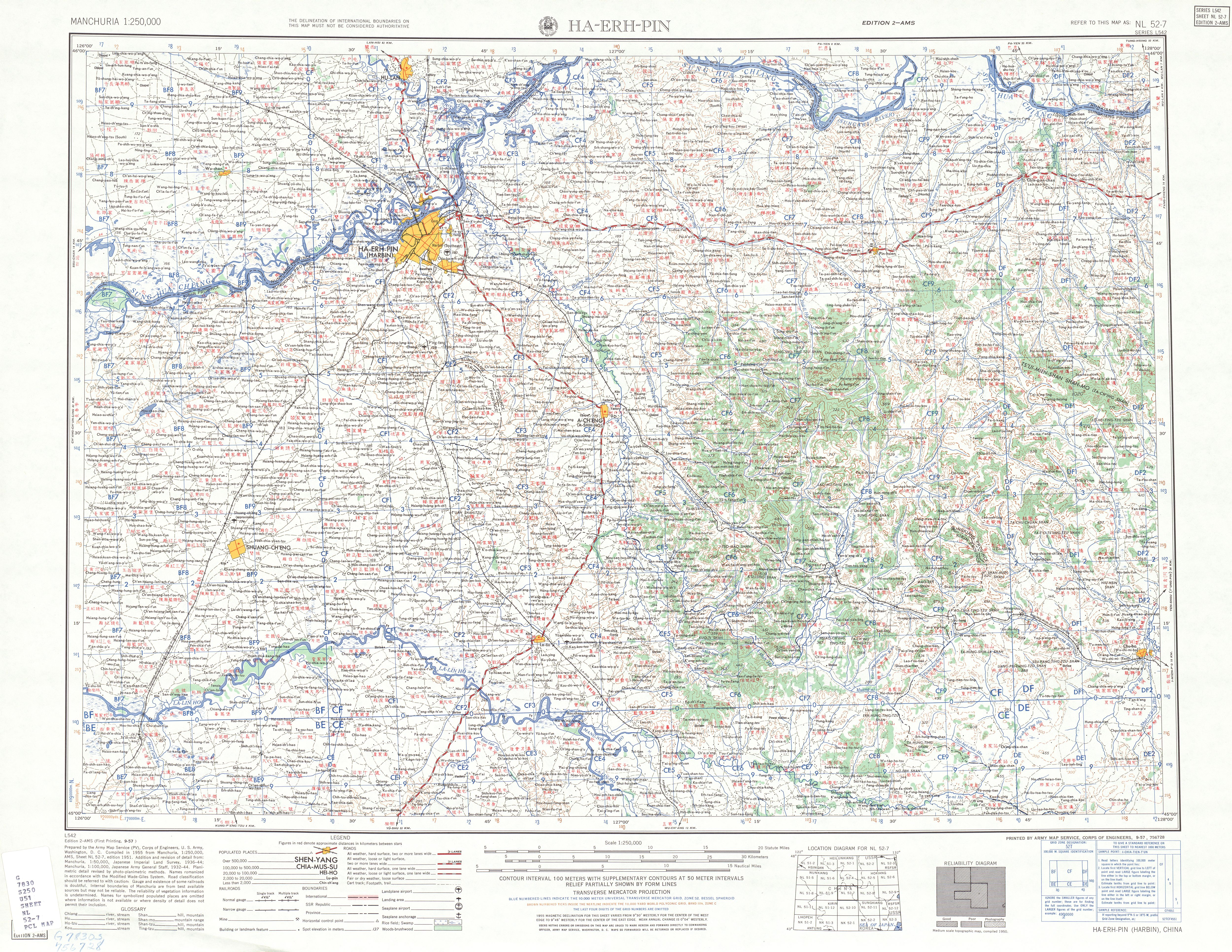
Map including Harbin (HA-ERH-PIN 哈爾濱) (AMS, 1955)

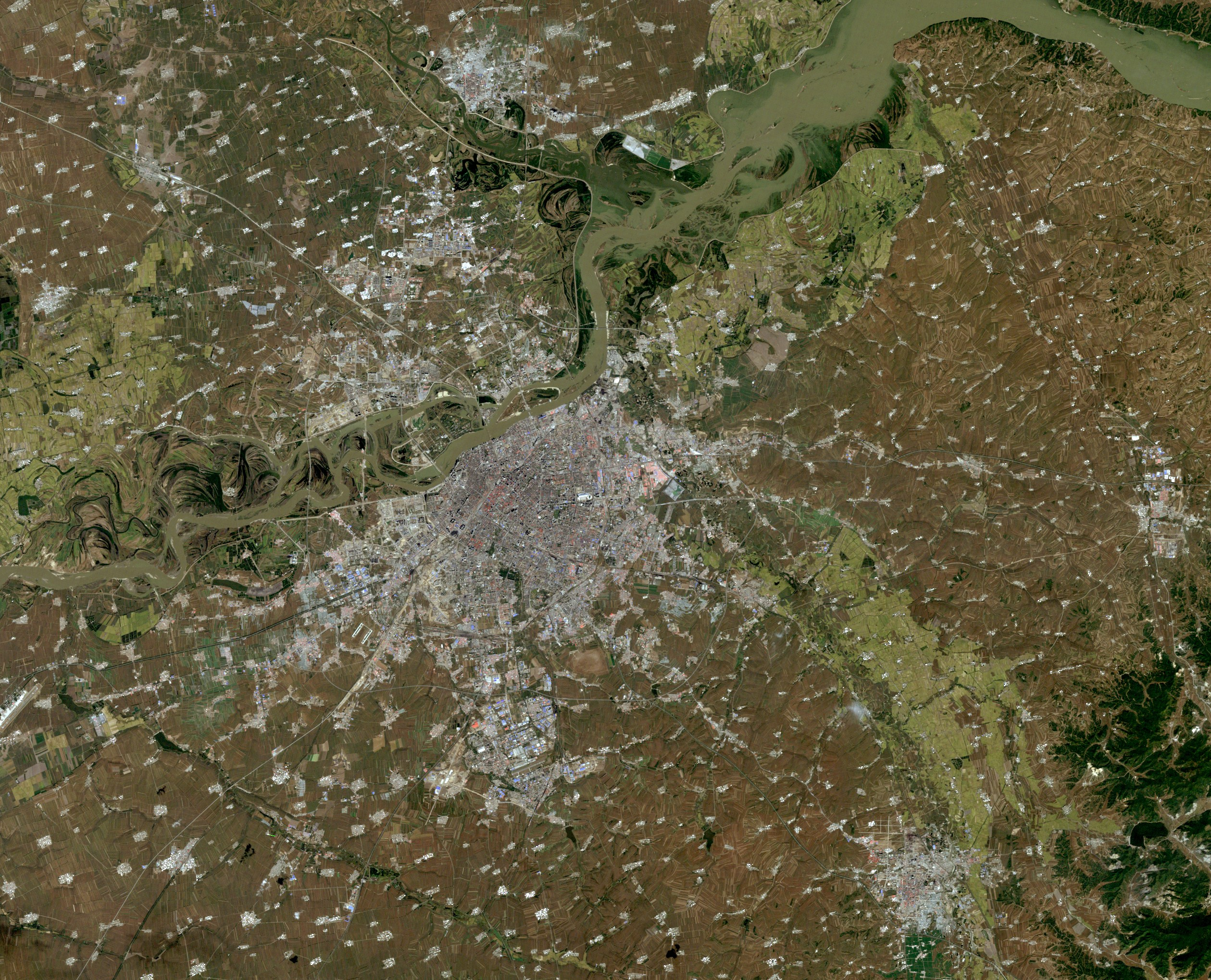
Harbin and vicinities, LandSat-5 satellite image, 2010-09-22

Harbin, with a total land area of 53,068 km^{2} (20,490 sq mi), is located in southern Heilongjiang province and is the provincial capital. The prefecture is also located at the southeastern edge of the Songnen Plain, a major part of China's Northeastern Plain. The city center also sits on the southern bank of the middle Songhua River. Harbin received its nickname The pearl on the swan's neck, since the shape of Heilongjiang resembles a swan. Its administrative area is rather large with latitude spanning 44° 04′−46° 40′ N, and longitude 125° 42′−130° 10' E. Neighbouring prefecture-level cities are Yichun to the north, Jiamusi and Qitaihe to the northeast, Mudanjiang to the southeast, Daqing to the west, and Suihua to the northwest. On its southwestern boundary is Jilin province. The main terrain of the city is generally flat and low lying, with an average elevation of around 150 metres (490 ft). The territory that comprises the 10 county-level divisions in the eastern part of the municipality consists of mountains and uplands. The easternmost part of Harbin prefecture also has extensive wetlands, mainly in Yilan County, which is located at the southwestern edge of the Sanjiang Plain.

=== Climate ===
Under the Köppen climate classification, Harbin features a monsoon-influenced humid continental climate (Dwa). Due to the Siberian high and its location above 45 degrees north latitude, the city is known for its cold weather and long winter. Its nickname Ice City is well-earned, as winters in the city are dry and freezing cold, with a 24-hour average in January of only −17.3 °C (0.9 °F), although the city sees little precipitation during the winter and is often sunny. Spring and autumn constitute brief transition periods with variable wind directions. Summers can be hot, with a July mean temperature of 23.7 °C (74.7 °F). Summer is also when most of the year's rainfall occurs, and more than half of the annual precipitation, at 539 millimetres (21.2 in), occurs in July and August alone. With monthly percent possible sunshine ranging from 45 percent in December to 60 percent in September, the city receives 2,340 hours of bright sunshine annually; on average precipitation falls 99 days out of the year. The annual mean temperature is 5.2 °C (41.4 °F), and extreme temperatures have ranged from −42.6 °C (−45 °F) or for the official weather station there, −41.1 °C (−42 °F) in January 1931 to 39.2 °C (103 °F) on which was hit most recently on 4 June 2001, though an unofficial record high temperature of 41.0 °C (105.8 °F) was recorded in July 1907.

To mitigate impacts of climate change, urban planning in Harbin has made use of sponge city concepts, including the Qunli stormwater park which collects, filters, and stores rainwater while conserving natural habitat.

Climate data for Harbin, elevation 118 m (387 ft), (1991–2020 normals, extremes 1951–present)
Month	Jan	Feb	Mar	Apr	May	Jun	Jul	Aug	Sep	Oct	Nov	Dec	Year
Record high °C (°F)	4.2 (39.6)	11.0 (51.8)	22.6 (72.7)	32.5 (90.5)	36.2 (97.2)	39.2 (102.6)	39.2 (102.6)	35.8 (96.4)	31.4 (88.5)	28.6 (83.5)	18.7 (65.7)	8.5 (47.3)	39.2 (102.6)
Mean maximum °C (°F)	−2.5 (27.5)	3.9 (39.0)	14.6 (58.3)	24.3 (75.7)	29.8 (85.6)	33.6 (92.5)	34.2 (93.6)	32.7 (90.9)	28.5 (83.3)	21.0 (69.8)	10.4 (50.7)	−0.8 (30.6)	35.1 (95.2)
Mean daily maximum °C (°F)	−11.8 (10.8)	−5.9 (21.4)	3.2 (37.8)	14.0 (57.2)	21.6 (70.9)	26.6 (79.9)	28.2 (82.8)	26.7 (80.1)	21.6 (70.9)	12.6 (54.7)	0.1 (32.2)	−9.8 (14.4)	10.6 (51.1)
Daily mean °C (°F)	−17.3 (0.9)	−11.9 (10.6)	−2.4 (27.7)	8.0 (46.4)	15.7 (60.3)	21.3 (70.3)	23.7 (74.7)	21.9 (71.4)	15.7 (60.3)	6.8 (44.2)	−4.6 (23.7)	−14.6 (5.7)	5.2 (41.3)
Mean daily minimum °C (°F)	−22.4 (−8.3)	−17.8 (0.0)	−8.2 (17.2)	1.9 (35.4)	9.6 (49.3)	16.0 (60.8)	19.3 (66.7)	17.4 (63.3)	10.2 (50.4)	1.6 (34.9)	−9 (16)	−19.1 (−2.4)	0.0 (31.9)
Mean minimum °C (°F)	−28.9 (−20.0)	−25.4 (−13.7)	−16.5 (2.3)	−4.2 (24.4)	3.5 (38.3)	10.4 (50.7)	15.6 (60.1)	14.2 (57.6)	5.4 (41.7)	−4.6 (23.7)	−15.7 (3.7)	−25.2 (−13.4)	−30.4 (−22.7)
Record low °C (°F)	−42.6 (−44.7)	−37.3 (−35.1)	−29 (−20)	−12.8 (9.0)	−3.8 (25.2)	4.6 (40.3)	9.5 (49.1)	5.5 (41.9)	−4.8 (23.4)	−16.2 (2.8)	−26.5 (−15.7)	−35.7 (−32.3)	−42.6 (−44.7)
Average precipitation mm (inches)	3.8 (0.15)	4.5 (0.18)	11.5 (0.45)	19.3 (0.76)	51.4 (2.02)	100.4 (3.95)	137.0 (5.39)	112.7 (4.44)	52.3 (2.06)	24.5 (0.96)	14.4 (0.57)	7.6 (0.30)	539.4 (21.23)
Average precipitation days (≥ 0.1 mm)	4.8	3.6	5.4	6.6	10.5	13.8	14.0	11.9	9.1	6.6	5.8	6.9	99
Average snowy days	8.2	6.6	7.0	2.5	0.1	0	0	0	0	2.2	8.3	10.1	45
Average relative humidity (%)	70	64	55	48	53	64	76	78	69	61	64	70	64
Mean monthly sunshine hours	129.7	171.7	215.3	215.7	237.0	240.2	222.6	220.4	224.1	191.9	148.9	122.1	2,339.6
Percentage possible sunshine	46	58	58	53	51	51	47	51	60	58	53	45	53
Average ultraviolet index	1	2	3	5	7	8	8	7	5	3	1	1	4
Source 1: Weather Atlas China Meteorological Administration
Source 2: China Meteorological Administration, Weather China extremes

Climate data for Harbin Taiping International Airport (2015–2024 normals)
Month	Jan	Feb	Mar	Apr	May	Jun	Jul	Aug	Sep	Oct	Nov	Dec	Year
Mean daily maximum °C (°F)	−11.8 (10.8)	−6.0 (21.2)	4.9 (40.8)	14.6 (58.3)	21.5 (70.7)	25.7 (78.3)	29.0 (84.2)	26.7 (80.1)	22.0 (71.6)	13.2 (55.8)	−0.2 (31.6)	−10.0 (14.0)	10.8 (51.5)
Daily mean °C (°F)	−17.7 (0.1)	−12.1 (10.2)	−0.8 (30.6)	8.5 (47.3)	15.7 (60.3)	20.6 (69.1)	24.3 (75.7)	22.0 (71.6)	16.1 (61.0)	6.8 (44.2)	−5.2 (22.6)	−14.9 (5.2)	5.3 (41.5)
Mean daily minimum °C (°F)	−22.3 (−8.1)	−17.5 (0.5)	−6.5 (20.3)	2.0 (35.6)	9.7 (49.5)	15.4 (59.7)	19.8 (67.6)	17.5 (63.5)	10.9 (51.6)	1.7 (35.1)	−8.7 (16.3)	−18.7 (−1.7)	0.3 (32.5)
Average relative humidity (%)	73	69	60	48	54	70	78	81	75	62	71	73	68

== Administrative divisions ==
The sub-provincial city of Harbin has direct jurisdiction over 9 districts, 2 county-level cities and 7 counties.

Map
Division code	Division	Area in km^{2}	Population(2010)	Seat	Postal code	Subdivisions					
Division code	Division	Area in km^{2}	Population(2010)	Seat	Postal code	Subdistricts	Towns	Townships	Ethnic townships	Residential communities	Villages
230100	Harbin	53,523.5	10,635,971	Songbei	150000	131	107	62	12	850	1879
City proper
230102	Daoli	479.2	923,762	Fushun Subdistrict	150000	20	3			116	37
230103	Nangang	182.9	1,343,857	Dacheng Subdistrict	150000	18	1	1	1	169	20
230104	Daowai	618.6	906,421	Daxing Subdistrict	150000	22	4			114	38
230108	Pingfang	98.0	190,253	Youxie Subdistrict	150000	6	2			25	11
230109	Songbei	736.3	236,848	Songbei Subdistrict	150000	7	2			33	48
230110	Xiangfang	339.5	916,408	Xiangfang Avenue Subdistrict	150000	20	4			117	46
Suburbs
230111	Hulan	2,185.9	764,534	Limin Subdistrict	150500	16	7	3		48	170
230112	Acheng	2,452.1	596,856	Jincheng Subdistrict	150300	12	7			76	108
230113	Shuangcheng	3,112.0	825,634	Xinxing Subdistrict	150100	10	6	11	5	18	246
Satellite cities
230183	Shangzhi Ct.	8,824.9	585,386	Shangzhi Town	150600		10	7	2	21	163
230184	Wuchang Ct.	7,502.0	881,224	Wuchang Town	150200		12	12	3	21	261
Rural
230123	Yilan Co.	4,616.0	388,319	Yilan Town	154800		6	3	1	12	132
230124	Fangzheng Co.	2,968.6	203,853	Fangzheng Town	150800		4	4		15	67
230125	Bin Co.	3,844.7	551,271	Binzhou Town	150400		12	5		5	143
230126	Bayan Co.	3,137.7	590,555	Bayan Town	151800		10	8		35	116
230127	Mulan Co.	3,600.0	277,685	Mulan Town	151900		6	2		7	86
230128	Tonghe Co.	5,675.5	210,650	Tonghe Town	150900		6	2		6	81
230129	Yanshou Co.	3,149.6	242,455	Yanshou Town	150700		5	4		12	106

== Economy ==
Harbin has the largest economy in Heilongjiang province. In 2013, Harbin's GDP totaled RMB501.08 billion, an increase of 8.9 percent over the previous year. The proportion of the three industries to the aggregate of GDP was 11.1:36.1:52.8 in 2012. The total value for imports and exports by the end of 2012 was US$5,330 million. In 2012, the working population reached 3.147 million. In 2015, Harbin had a GDP of RMB 575.12 billion.

The chernozem soil in Harbin is one of the most nutrient rich in all of China, making it valuable for cultivating food and textile-related crops. As a result, Harbin is China's base for the production of commodity grain and an ideal location for setting up agricultural businesses.

Harbin also has industries such as light industry, textile, medicine, food, aircraft, automobile, metallurgy, electronics, building materials, and chemicals that help to form a fairly comprehensive industrial system. Several major corporations are based in the city. Harbin Electric Company Limited, Harbin Aircraft Industry Group and Northeast Light Alloy Processing Factory are some of key enterprises. Power manufacturing is a main industry in Harbin; hydro and thermal power equipment manufactured here makes up one-third of the total installed capacity in China. According to Platts, in 2009–10 Harbin Electric was the second largest manufacturer of steam turbines by worldwide market share, tying Dongfang Electric and slightly behind Shanghai Electric. Harbin Pharmaceutical Group, which mainly focus on research, development, manufacture and sale of medical products, is China's second-biggest pharmaceutical company by market value.

Harbin International Trade and Economic Fair has been held annually since 1990. This investment and trade fair cumulatively attracting more than 1.9 million exhibitors and visitors from more than 80 countries and regions to attend, resulting over US$100 billion contract volume concluded according to the statistics of 2013. Harbin is among major destinations of FDI in Northeast China, with utilized FDI totaling US$980 million in 2013. After the 18th regular meeting between Sino-Russian Prime Ministers between Li Keqiang and Dmitry Anatolyevich Medvedev in October 2013, two sides come to make an agreement that the Harbin International Trade and Economic Fair will be renamed "China-Russia EXPO" and be co-sponsored by the Chinese Ministry of Commerce, Heilongjiang Provincial government, the Russian Ministry of Economic Development and Russia's Ministry of Trade and Industry.

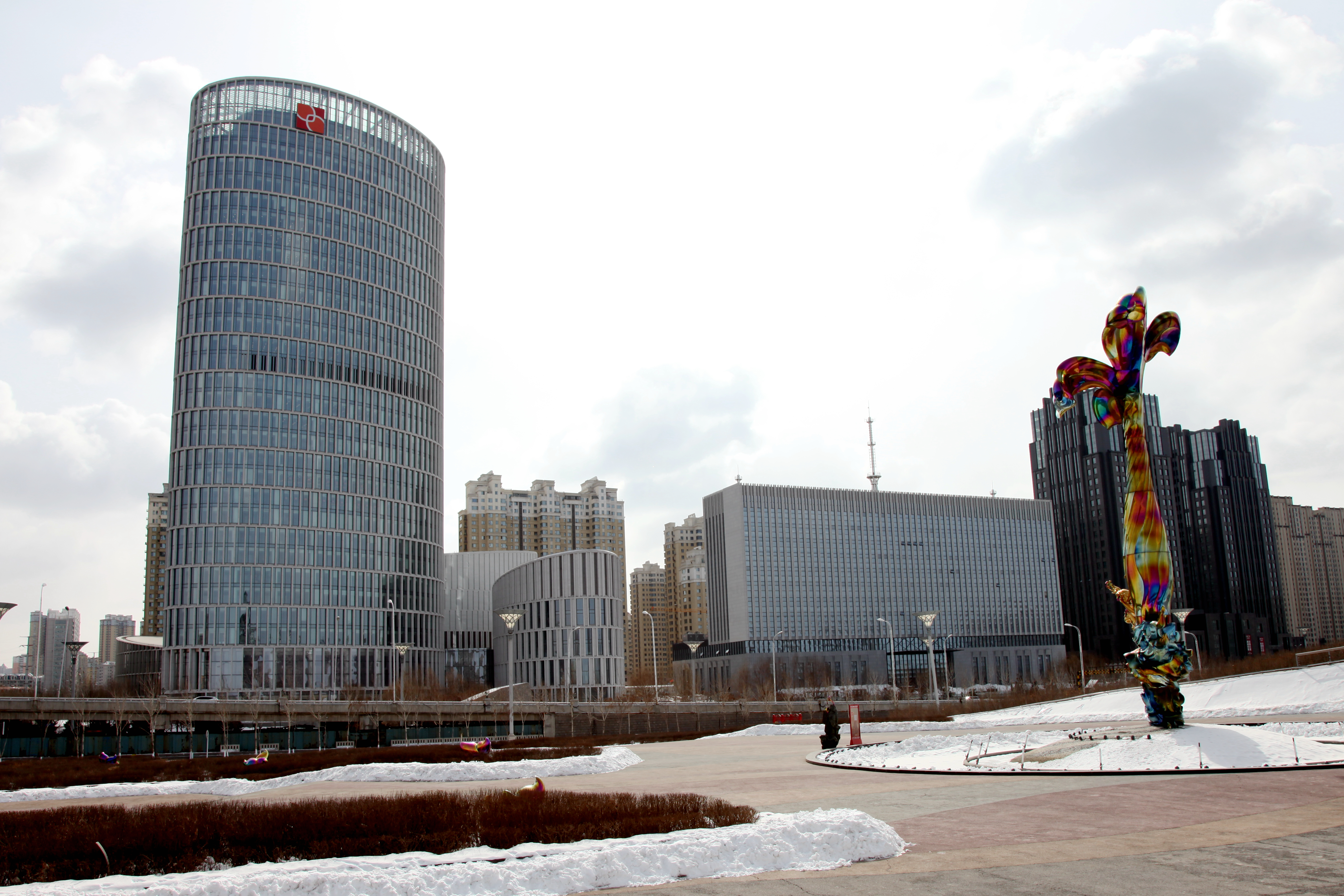
Headquarters of Harbin Bank

In the financial sector, Longjiang Bank and Harbin Bank are some of the largest banks in Northeast China, with headquarters in Harbin. The latter ranks fourth by competitiveness among Chinese city commercial banks in 2011.

In commerce, there is Qiulin Group, which owns Harbin's largest department store.

=== Economic development zones and ports ===
- Harbin Economic & Technology Development Zone (National), mainly focus on telecommunications equipment, chemicals production and processing, automobile production/assembly, electronics, textiles, medical equipment and supplies.
- Harbin High and New Technological Development Zone, focus on optical-mechanical-electrical integration, biology, medicine, electronics and information technology.
- Harbin Pingfang Automobile Industrial Zone (Provincial), mainly focus on automobile production/assembly, electronics assembly & manufacturing, heavy industry, instruments & industrial equipment production.
- Harbin Limin Economic Development Zone (Provincial), mainly focus on trading and distribution, food/beverage processing, medical equipment and supplies, shipping/warehousing/logistics.
- Harbin Port

Harbin Songbei Economic Development Zone

Songbei Economic Development Zone is located in Songbei District of Harbin. The zone has a planned area of 5.53 square kilometers. Electronics assembly & manufacturing, food and beverage processing are the encouraged industries in the zone. Many regional and provincial headquarters of large enterprises such as the China Datang Corporation, China Netcom and China Telecom have joined in this district, preliminary constituting the economy concentration zone of the local headquarters. Regional Scientific research centers including Harbin Science and Technology Innovation Center and Harbin International Agricultural Science and Technology Innovation Center are also located in this development zone. Profit from these major research institutes, Harbin ranked ninth among 50 major Chinese cities in scientific and technological innovation ability in scientific and technological competitiveness ranking in 2006, as well as ranking sixth among Chinese cities in the amount of scientific and technological achievements.

Harbin Economic and Technological Development Zone

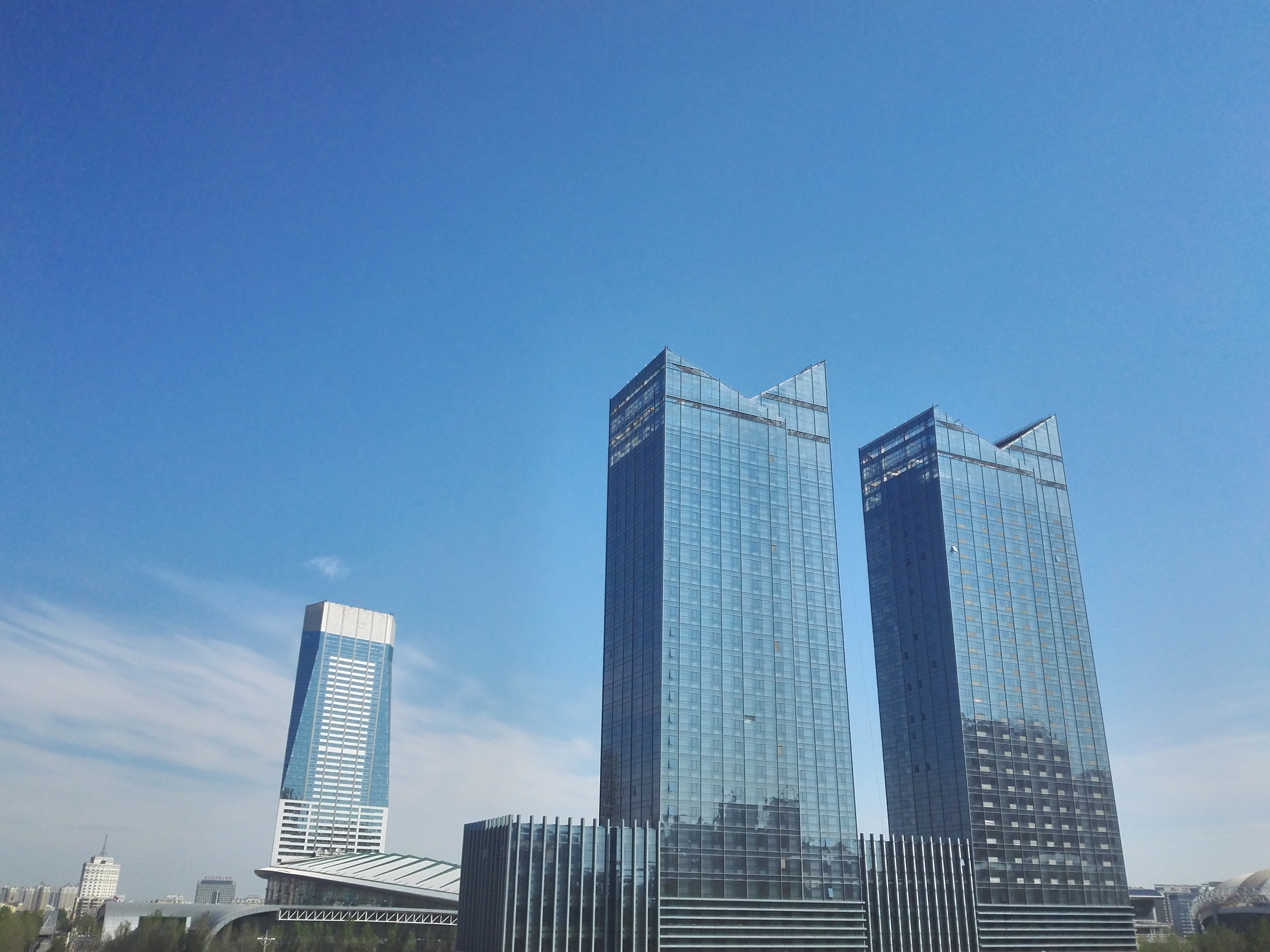
Office Buildings around Harbin ICE Center

Harbin Economic and Technological Development Zone (HETDZ) is one of the 90 national economical development zones of China. It was set up in June 1991, and was approved by the State Council as a national development zone in April 1993. In December 2012, Harbin High Technology Development Zone was merged into HETDZ. In 2009, the hi-tech zone was separated from HETDZ again. The area now has a total area of 18.5 square-kilometers in the centralized parks, subdivided into Nangang and Haping Road Centralized Parks. The 12.2 square-kilometers Yingbin Road Hi-tech Centralized Park, which was formerly part of HETDZ, is currently under the administration of Harbin High and New Technology Industry Development Zone since 2009.

- Nangang Centralized Park: designated for the incubation of high-tech projects and research and development base of enterprises as well as tertiary industries such as finance, insurance, services, catering, tourism, culture, recreation and entertainment, where the headquarters of large famous companies and their branches in Harbin are located.
- Yingbin Road Centralized Park: mainly focus on high-tech incubation projects, high-tech industrial development.
- Haping Road Centralized Park: designated for a comprehensive industrial basis for the investment projects of automobile and automobile parts manufacturing, medicines, foodstuffs, electronics, textile; Automobile production and assembly raw material processing are the encouraged industries in this region.

Harbin High and New Technology Industry Development Zone

Harbin High and New Technology Industry Development Zone is one of the 56 national High and New Technology Industry Development Zones of China. The zone was first set up as a provincial level development zone in 1988, and was approved by the State Council as a national development zone in 1991 respectively. It has 23.9 square-kilometers of built-area totally, and subdivided into two parts: Science and Technology Innovation Town and High-tech Industrial Development Zone.

== Demographics ==
=== Population ===
Historical population
Year	Pop.	±%
1934	500,526	—
1944	711,818	+42.2%
1953	1,162,962	+63.4%
1964	1,962,000	+68.7%
1982	2,542,832	+29.6%
1990	4,219,516	+65.9%
2000	9,413,359	+123.1%
2010	10,635,971	+13.0%
2020	10,009,854	−5.9%
Population size may be affected by changes on administrative divisions.

The 2020 census revealed total population in Harbin was 10,009,854, representing a 5.62 percent decrease over the previous decade. The built-up area, made up of all urban districts but Acheng and Shuangcheng not urbanized yet, had a population of 5,282,083 people. 70.61 percent lived in urban areas, while 29.39 lived in rural areas.

The demographic profile for the Harbin metropolitan area in general is relatively old: 10.46 percent are under the age of 14, while 14.65 percent are over 65. Harbin has a higher percentage of males (50.02 percent) than females (49.98 percent). Harbin currently has a lower birth rate than other parts of China, with 6.95 births per 1,000 inhabitants, compared to the Chinese average of 12.13 births.

=== Ethnic groups ===
Most of Harbin's residents belong to the Han Chinese majority (93% in 2000). Ethnic minorities include the Manchu, Hui, and Mongol. There is a minor community of Russians. The ethnic composition according to the 2020 census:

Ethnic groups in Harbin, 2020 census
Ethnicity	Han	Manchu	Korean	Hui	Mongol	Sibe	Duar	Uyghur	Zhuang	Tujia	Other
Population	9,550,738	296,221	91,706	29,435	18,707	3,418	2,763	2,317	2,124	1,939	10,486
%	95.41	2.96	0.92	0.29	0.19	0.03	0.03	0.02	0.02	0.02	0.10
% of ethnic minorities	–	64.52	19.97	6.41	4.07	0.74	0.60	0.50	0.46	0.42	2.28

=== Religion ===
The Catholic minority is pastorally served by the Apostolic Administration of Harbin, a missionary pre-diocesan jurisdiction. It also has the Eastern Catholic former cathedral of the Russian Catholic Apostolic Exarchate of Harbin. The badly damaged Church of the Iver Icon of the Mother of God was previously used by Russian soldiers of the Outer Amur Military Region, then garrisoned in Harbin. A small percentage (0.4% in 2000) of the city's population consists of Muslims. Daowai Mosque is located in Harbin and is the largest mosque in Heilongjiang province. Harbin had a small Jewish community centered on Zhongyang Main Street, which was home to many European Jewish refugees.

== Culture ==
The Harbin local culture is based on Han culture, combined with Manchu culture and Russian culture. This combination of cultures influences the local architecture style, food, music, and customs. The city of Harbin was appointed a UNESCO City of Music on 22 June 2010 as part of the Creative Cities Network.

=== Cuisine ===
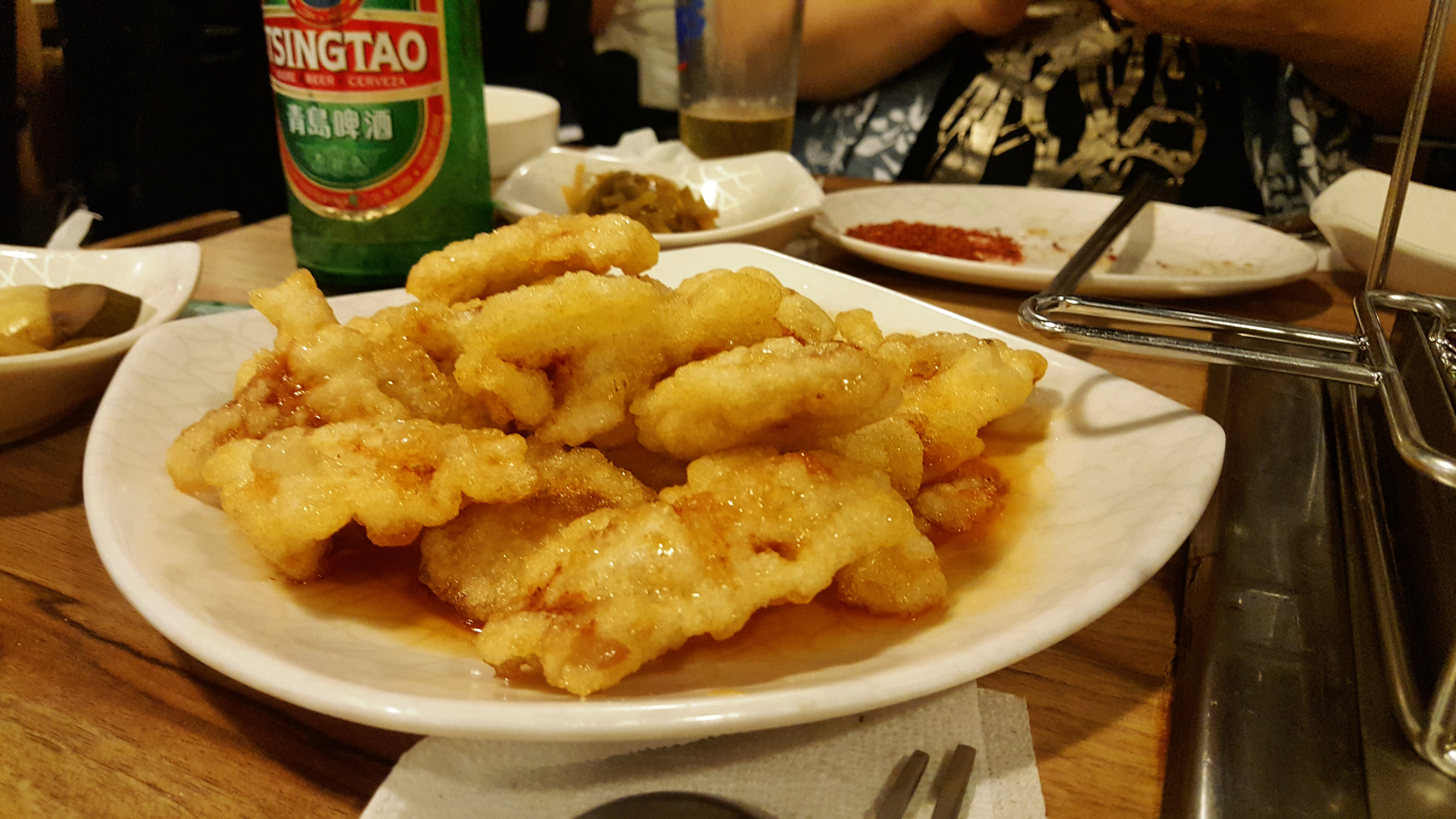
Traditional Guo Bao Rou

Harbin is renowned for its culinary tradition. The cuisine of Harbin consists of European dishes and Northern Chinese dishes mainly typified by heavy sauce and deep-frying.

One of the most famous dishes in Northeastern Chinese cuisine is Guo Bao Rou, a form of sweet and sour pork. It is a classic dish from Harbin that originated in the early 20th century in Daotai Fu (pinyin: Dàotái Fǔ). It consists of a bite-sized pieces of pork in a potato starch batter, deep-fried until crispy. They are then lightly coated in a variation of a sweet and sour sauce, made from freshly prepared syrup, rice vinegar, sugar, flavoured with ginger, cilantro, sliced carrot and garlic. The Harbin Guobaorou is distinct from that of other areas of China, such as Liaoning, where the sauce may be made using either tomato ketchup or orange juice. Rather the Harbin style is dominated by the honey and ginger flavours and has a clear or honey yellow colour. Originally the taste was fresh and salty. In order to fete foreign guests, Zheng Xingwen, the chef of Daotai Fu, altered the dish into a sweet and sour taste. Usually, people prefer to go to several small or middle size restaurants to enjoy this dish, because it is difficult to handle the frying process at home.

Demoli Stewed Live Fish is one among other notable dishes in Harbin, which is originated in a village named Demoli on the expressway from Harbin to Jiamusi. The village is now Demoli Service Area on Harbin-Tongjiang Expressway. Stewed Chicken with Mushrooms, Braised Pork with Vermicelli, and quick-boil pork with Chinese sauerkraut are also typical authentic local dishes.

Since Russia had a strong influence on Harbin's history, the local cuisine of Harbin also contains Russian-style dishes and flavor. There are several authentic Russian-style restaurants in Harbin, especially alongside the Zhongyang Street.

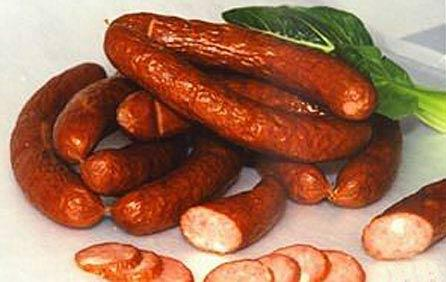
Harbin-style smoked sausage

A popular regional specialty is Harbin-style smoked savory red sausage. This product, which is similar to mild Lithuanian and German sausages, tend to be much more of European flavours than other Chinese sausages. In 1900, Russian merchant Ivan Yakovlevich Churin founded a branch in Harbin, which was named Churin Foreign trading company (pinyin: Qiulin Yanghang; Russian: Цюлинь Янхан) selling imported clothes, leather boots, canned foods, vodka, etc., and began to expand sales network in other cities in Manchuria. The influx of Europeans through the Trans-Siberian Railway and Chinese Eastern Railway, increased demand of European flavor food. In 1909, Churin's Sausage Factory was founded, and first produced European flavor sausage with the manufacturing process of Lithuanian staff. Since then, European style sausage has become a specialty of the city.

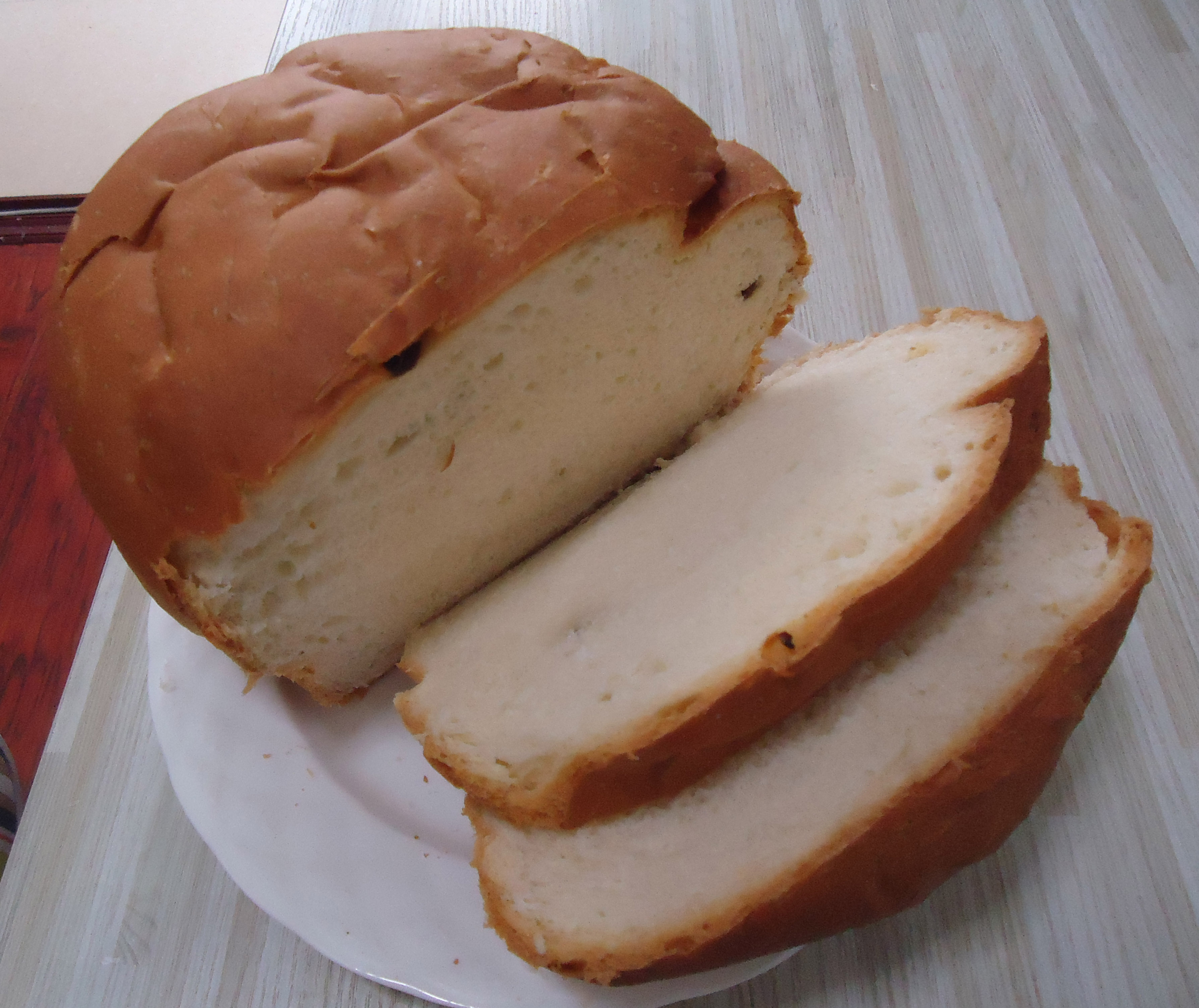
Dalieba bread sold at Dashang Group's gourmet corner in Dalian (2018)

A Russian style large round bread 大列巴 dà liě ba, derived from the Russian word khleb for "bread" is also produced in Harbin's bakeries. Dalieba is a miche like sourdough bread. First introduced to the locals by a Russian baker, it has been sold in bakeries in Harbin for over a hundred years. Dalieba's sour and chewy taste is different from other traditional soft and fluffy Asian style breads in other parts of China.

Kvass, a Russia-originated fermented beverage made from black or regular rye bread, is also popular in Harbin. Madier ("马迭尔", derived from "Modern") ice-cream provided in the Zhongyang Street is also well known in northern China. This ice cream is made from a specific traditional recipe and it tastes a little salty but more sweet and milky. Besides its headquarters in Harbin, it also has branches in other major Chinese cities including Beijing, Shanghai, etc.

=== Tourism ===
Harbin is a popular domestic tourist destination, particularly in the winter, when there are large-scale ice sculpture displays. Harbin also has a large indoor ski park, located inside the Wanda Harbin Mall (counting six ski slants up to 500 metres (1,600 ft) in length). During the 2023–2024 winter season, there were 87 million visitors, mostly coming from other parts of China.

Harbin is also known for its European-style structures and designs, such as the popular Saint Sophia Cathedral, Central Street, and the Baroque compositional complex in Lao Daowai (Old Town).

=== Winter culture ===
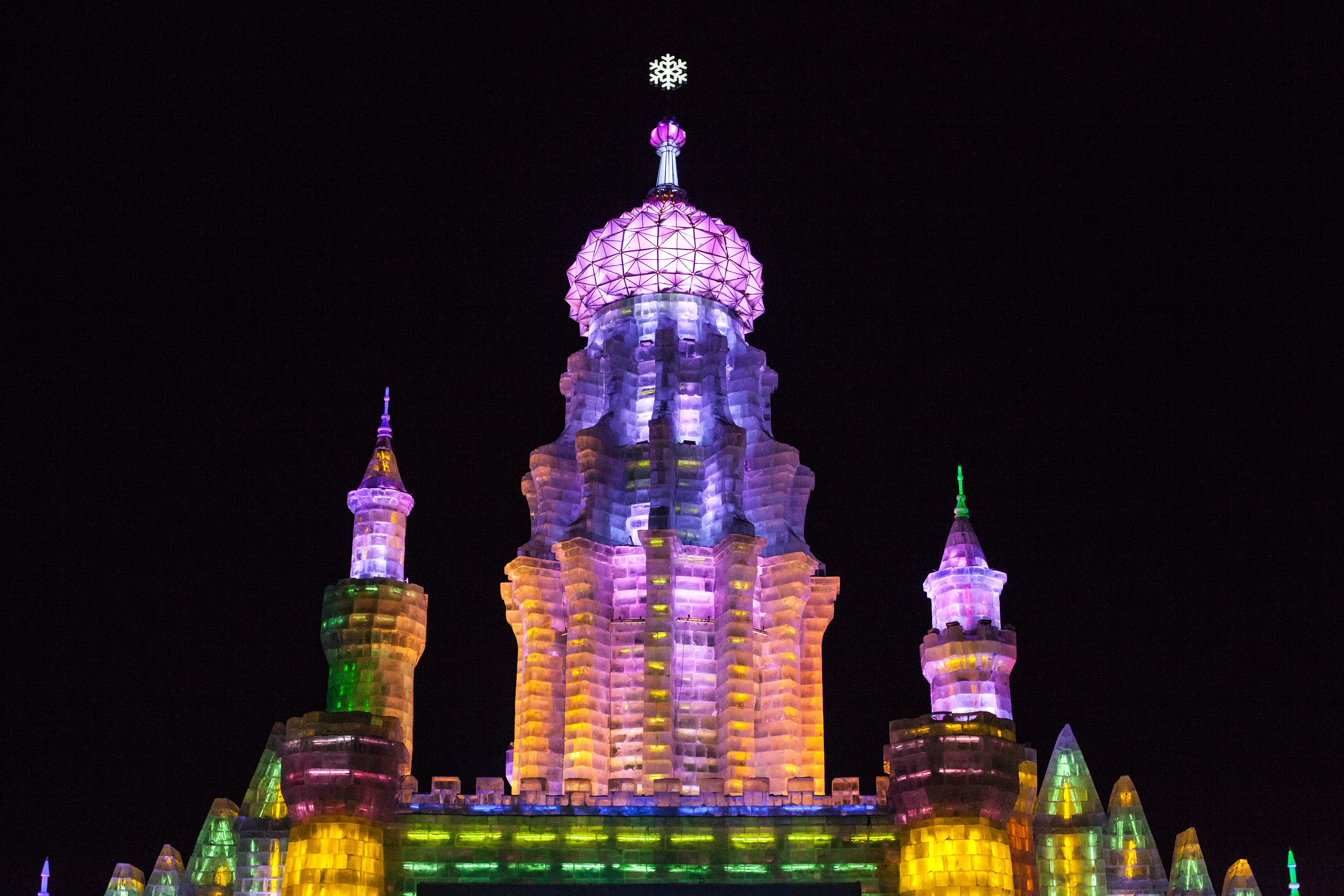
Tower at Harbin Ice and Snow Festival, 2013

Located in northern Northeast China, Harbin is the northernmost among major cities in China. Under the direct influence of the Siberian Anticyclone, the average daily temperature is −19.7 °C (−3.5 °F) in winter. Annual low temperatures below −25.0 °C (−13.0 °F) are not uncommon. Nicknamed "Ice City" due to its freezingly cold winter, Harbin is decorated by various styles of ice and snow sculptures from December to March every year.

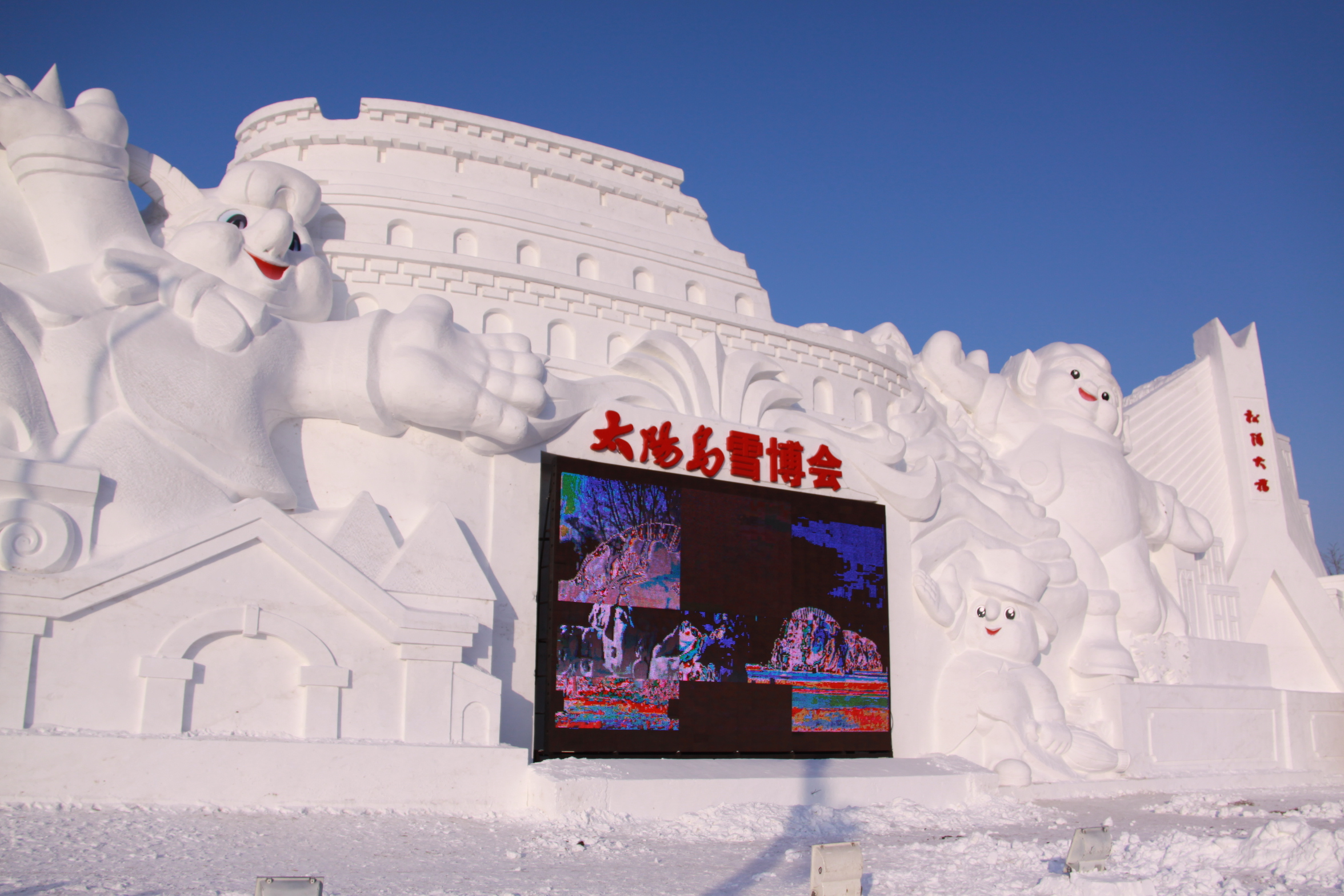
Snow Sculpture in Sun Island, 2011

The annual Harbin International Ice and Snow Sculpture Festival has been held since 1985. Although the official start date is 5 January each year, in practice, many of the sculptures can be seen before. While there are ice sculptures throughout the city, there are two main exhibition areas: enormous snow sculptures at Sun Island (Taiyang Dao, a AAAAA-rated recreational area on the opposite side of the Songhua River from the city) and the separate "Ice and Snow World" that operates each night with lights switched on, illuminating the sculptures from both inside and outside. Ice and Snow World features illuminated full-size buildings made from blocks of 2–3 feet thick crystal clear ice directly taken from the Songhua River, which passes through the city. The sculptures inside the exhibition ground takes 15,000 workers to work for 16 days. In early December, ice artisans cut 120,000 cubic metres (4.2 million cubic feet) of ice blocks from Songhua River's frozen surface as raw materials for the ice sculptures' show. Massive ice buildings, large-scale snow sculptures, ice slides, festival food and drinks can also be found in several parks and major avenues in the city. Winter activities in the festival include Yabuli Alpine Skiing, snow mobile driving, winter-swimming in Songhua River, and the traditional ice-lantern exhibition in Zhaolin Garden, which was first held in 1963. Snow carving and ice and snow recreations are famous nationwide, especially among Asian countries including Korea, Japan, Thailand and Singapore.

The "Harbin International Ice and Snow Festival" is one of the four largest ice and snow festivals in the world, along with Japan's Sapporo Snow Festival, Canada's Quebec City Winter Carnival, and Norway's Holmenkollen Ski Festival.

Every November, the city of Harbin sends teams of ice artisans to the United States to promote their unique art form. It takes more than 100 artisans to create ICE!, the annual display of indoor Christmas-themed ice carvings in National Harbor, Maryland; Nashville, Tennessee; Kissimmee, Florida; and Grapevine, Texas.

=== The Music City ===
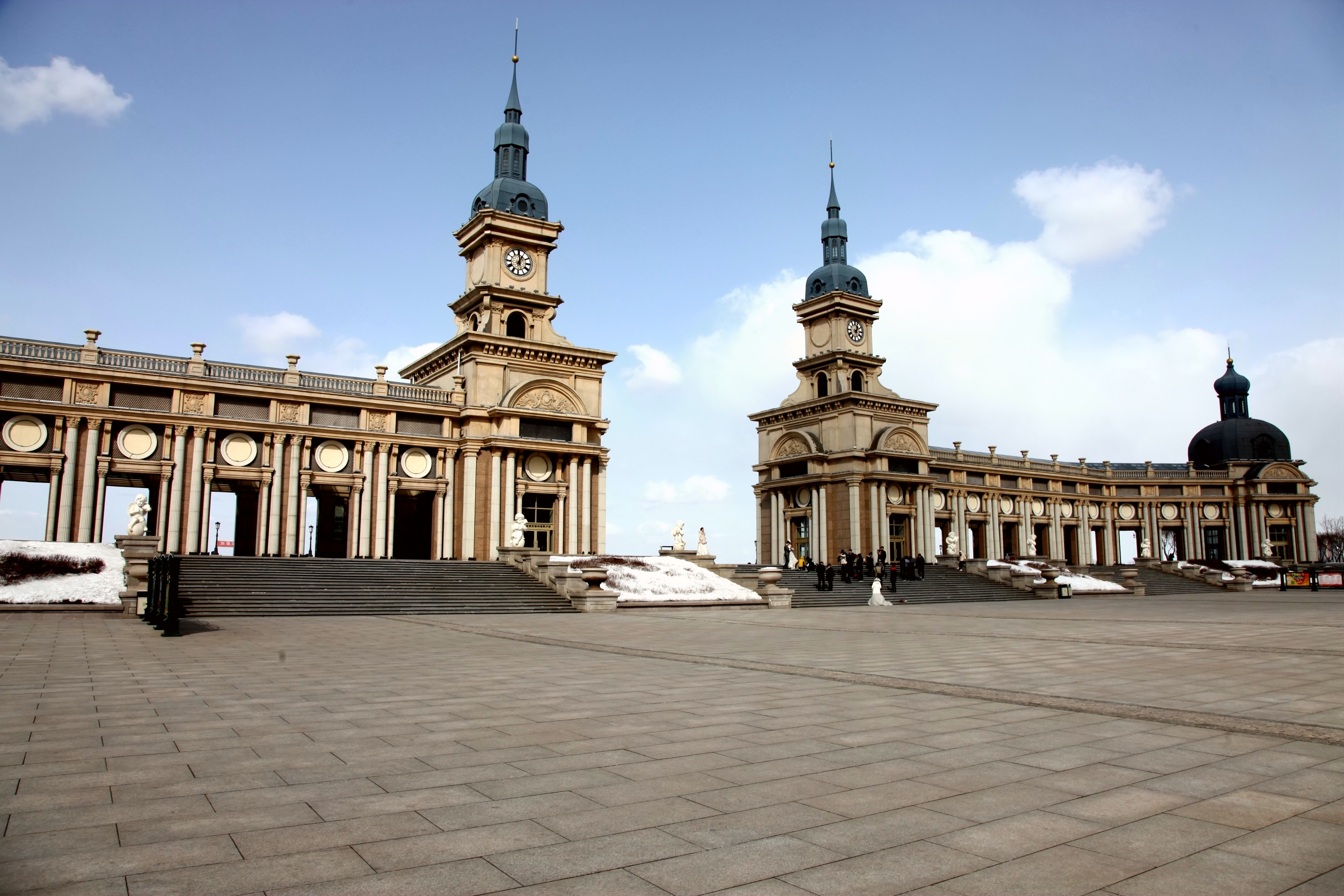
Harbin Music Park, located in Youyi West Road

Founded in 1908, the Harbin Symphony Orchestra was China's oldest symphony orchestra. Harbin No.1 Music School was also the first music school in China, which was founded in 1928. Nearly 100 famous musicians have studied at the school since its founding, said Liu Yantao, deputy chief of Harbin Cultural, Press and Publication Bureau. Every year, thousands of youngsters start their music dreams in this city, and the "Harbin Summer Music Concert" serial activities that always be held in the every year's summer present the music passion of the locals. UNESCO recognizes China's Harbin as "The Music City" as part of the Creative Cities Network in 2010.

==== Harbin Summer Music Concert ====
Harbin Summer Music Concert ('Concert' for short) is a national concert festival, which is held on 6 August every two years for a period of 10~11 days. During the concert, multiple evenings, concert, race and activities are held. The artists come from all over the world.

The 'Harbin Summer Music Month', which was then renamed as 'Harbin Summer Music Concert', was held in August 1958. The first formal Concert was held on 5 August 1961 in Harbin Youth Palace, and kept on every year until 1966 when the Cultural Revolution started in China. In 1979, the Concert was recovered and from 1994, it has been held every two years. As a part of 2006 Harbin Summer Music Concert's opening ceremony, a 1,001-piano concert was held in Harbin's Flood memorial square located at the north end of Central Street (Chinese: 中央大街; pinyin: Zhōngyāng Dàjiē) on 6 August 2006. Repertoires of the ensemble consisted of Triumphal March, Military March, Radetzky March and famous traditional local song On The Sun Island. This concert set a new Guinness World Record for largest piano ensemble, surpassing the previous record held by German artists in a 600-piano concert. In 2008, the 29th Harbin Summer Music Concert was held on 6 August.

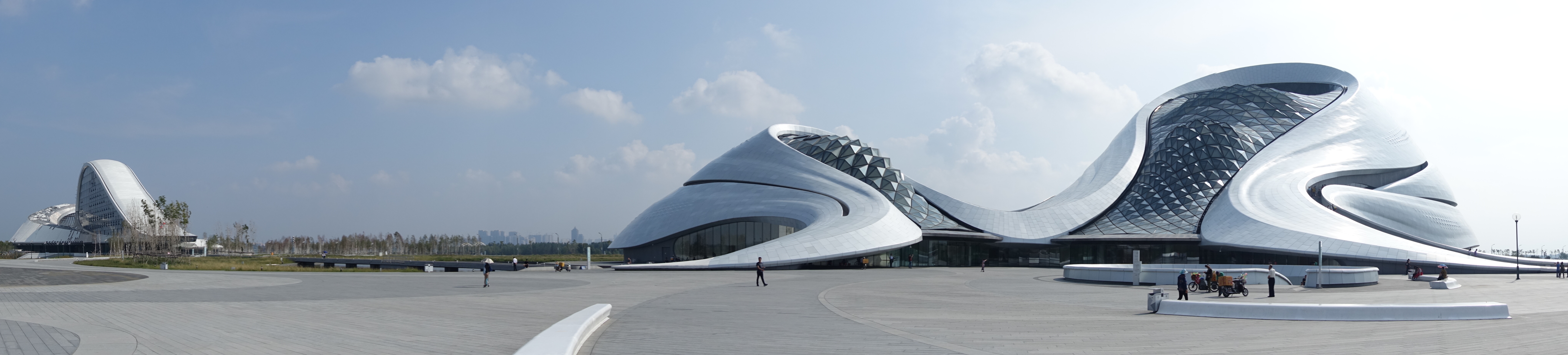
Harbin Grand Theatre, designed by MAD Studio. Located in Harbin's Songbei District, the opera house is surrounded by wetlands and waterways of Songhua River.

=== Media ===
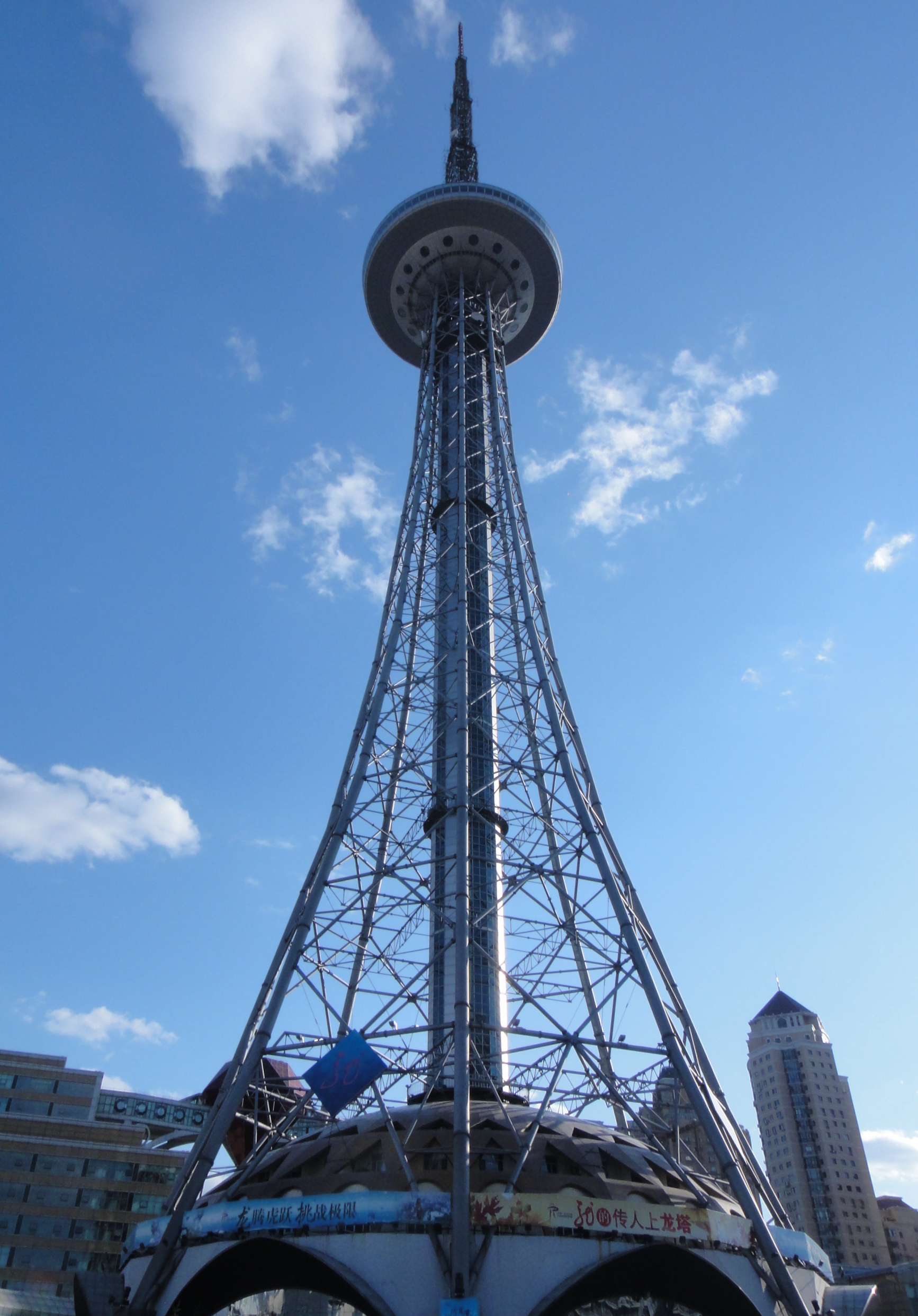
Dragon Tower (Long Ta), a 336-meter-tall freestanding lattice tower, serves as the headquarter of HLJTV.

=== Television and radio ===
- Heilongjiang Television (HLJTV) serves as the media outlets of this region, broadcasts on seven channels as well as a satellite channel for other provinces.
- Harbin Television (HRBTV) serves as a municipal station, which has five channels for specialized programming.
- Long Guang, Dragon Broadcast, formerly Heilongjiang People's Broadcasting Station, the radio station group that serves the whole Heilongjiang region, providing seven channels including a Korean language broadcast station.
- Harbin People's Broadcasting Station (HPBS), broadcasts music, news, traffic, economy and life in Harbin and adjacent areas including Daqing, Suihua and Fuyu.

== Architecture ==
Harbin is notable for its combination of Chinese and European architecture styles. Many Russian and other European style buildings are protected by the government. The architecture in Harbin gives it the nicknames of "Oriental Moscow" and "Oriental Paris" in China.

=== Historical architecture ===
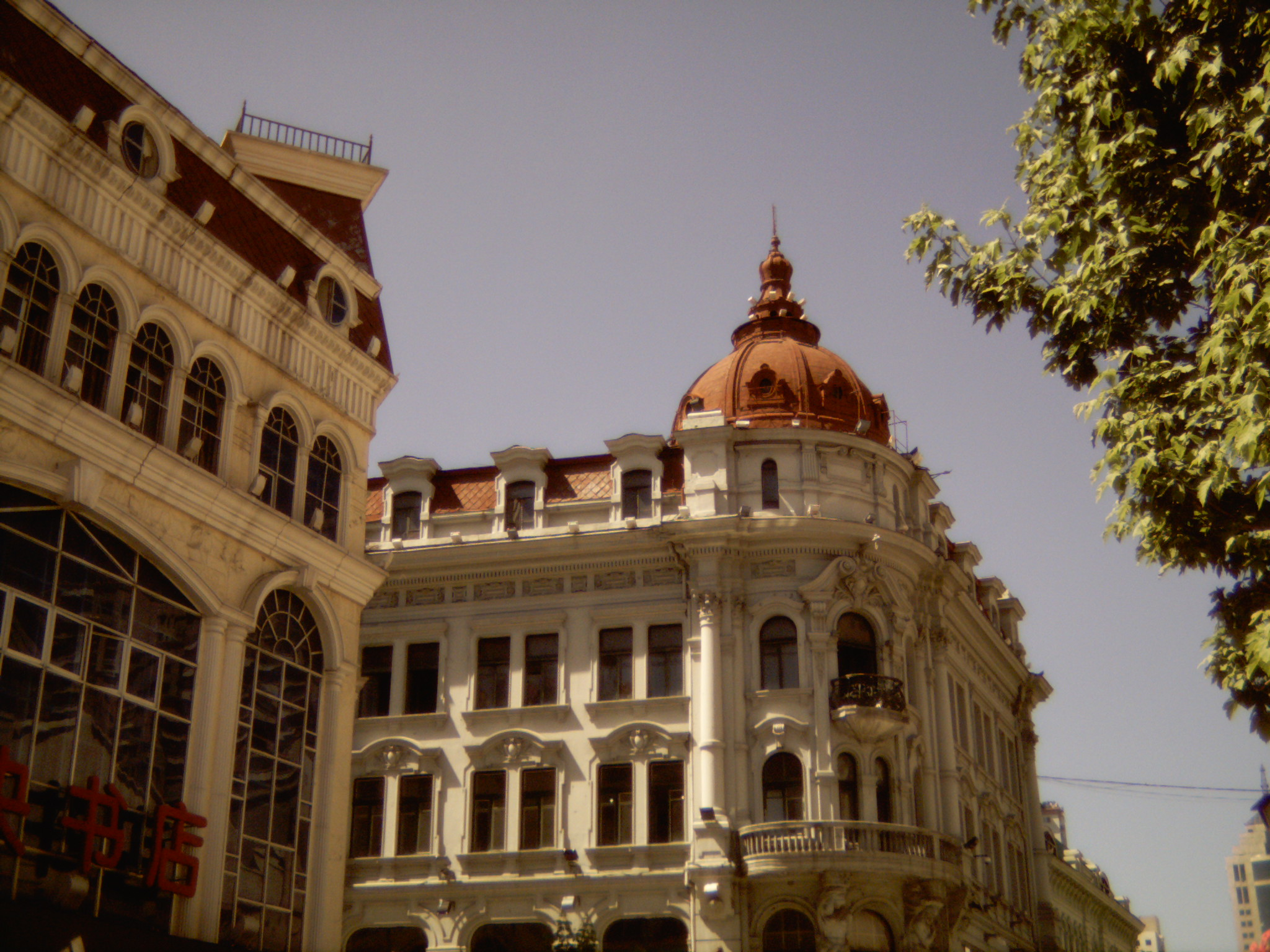
European-style building in Central Street

Central Street, one of the main business streets in Harbin, is a remnant of the bustling international business activities at the turn of the 20th century. First built in 1898, The 1.4 km (0.87 mi) long street is now a veritable museum of European architectural styles: Baroque and Byzantine façades, little Russian bakeries and French fashion houses, as well as non European architectural styles: American eateries, and Japanese restaurants.

The Russian Orthodox church, Saint Sophia Cathedral, is also located in the central district of Daoli. Built in 1907 and expanded from 1923 to 1932, it was closed during the Great Leap Forward and Cultural Revolution periods. Following its designation in 1996 as a national cultural heritage site (First class Preserved Building), it was turned into a museum as a showcase of the history of Harbin city in 1997. The 53.35 m (175.0 ft)-tall Church, which covers an area of 721 square meters, is a typical representative of Byzantine architecture.

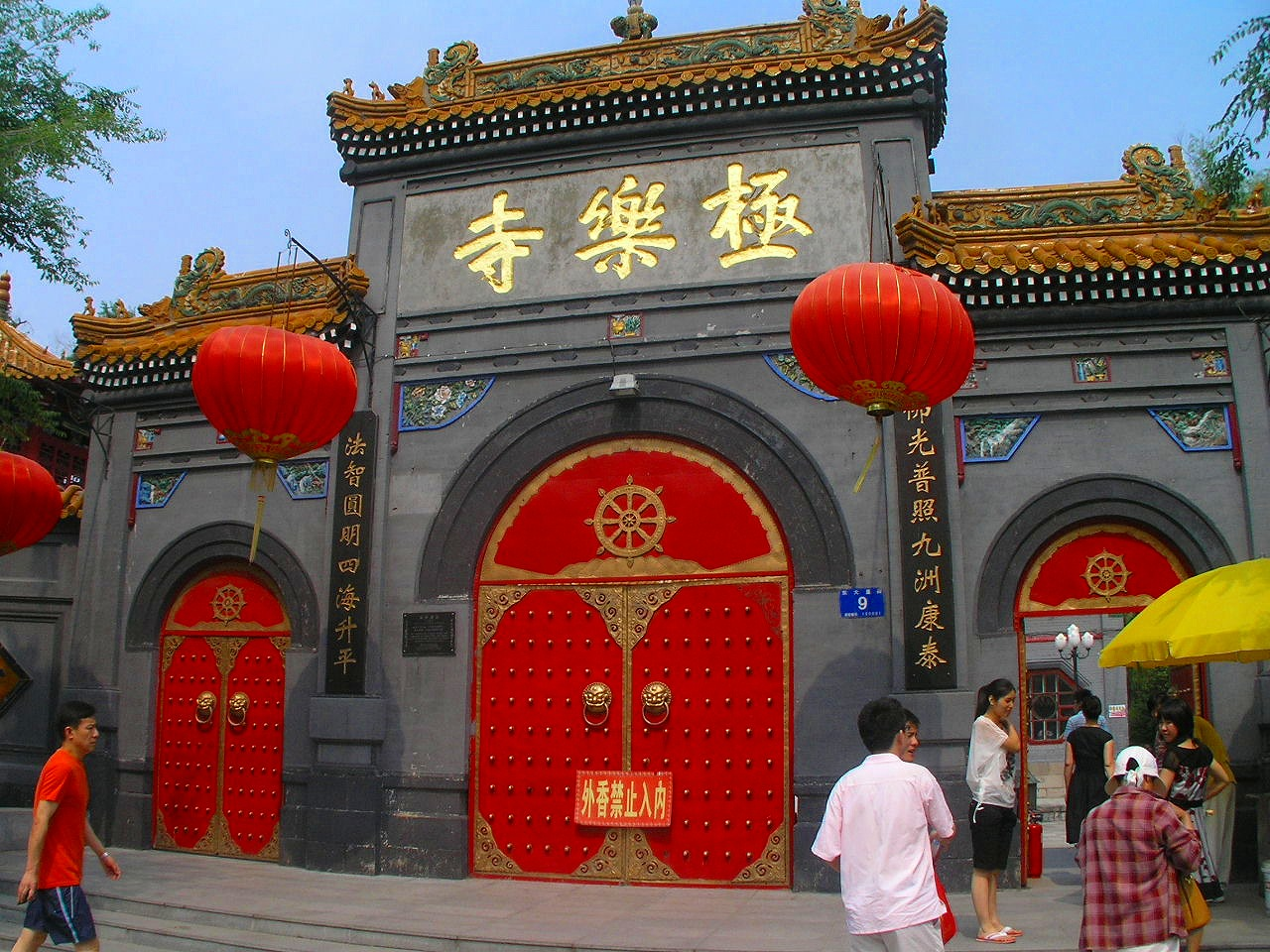
Ji Le Temple (Temple of Bliss), a Buddhist temple in Harbin

Many citizens believe that the Orthodox church damaged the local feng shui, so they donated money to build a Chinese Buddhist monastery in 1921, the Ji Le Temple. There were more than 15 Russian Orthodox churches and two cemeteries in Harbin until 1949. The Communist Revolution, and the subsequent Cultural Revolution, and the decrease in the ethnic Russian population, saw many of them abandoned or destroyed. Today, about 10 churches remain, while services are held only in the Church of the Intercession in Harbin.

The Harbin Railway Administration, formerly known as the Middle East Railway Administration, commonly known as the "big stone house", was built in 1902, destroyed twice and rebuilt in 1904 and 1906.

=== Modern architecture ===
Harbin Grand Theatre is located in the cultural center of Songbei District, Harbin. It provides 1600- and 400-seat venues. The architecture uses the external design of the heterogeneous hyperbolic surface.

The Harbin Grand Theatre is a landmark building in Harbin. It is built in accordance with the water and is consistent with the surrounding environment. It embodies the concept of the landscape and landscape of the north. As a public building facility, the theatre provides people and visitors with different spatial experiences from the theatre, landscape, square and stereoscopic platform. During the design process, architect Ma Yansong has set up a unique sightseeing corridor and viewing platform in the Grand Theatre. Visitors are able to overlook the surrounding wetland and enjoy the unique natural wetland scenery of Harbin.

After the completion of the Harbin Grand Theatre, the public can enjoy opera, symphony, ballet and drama performances in various function rooms.

== Sports ==
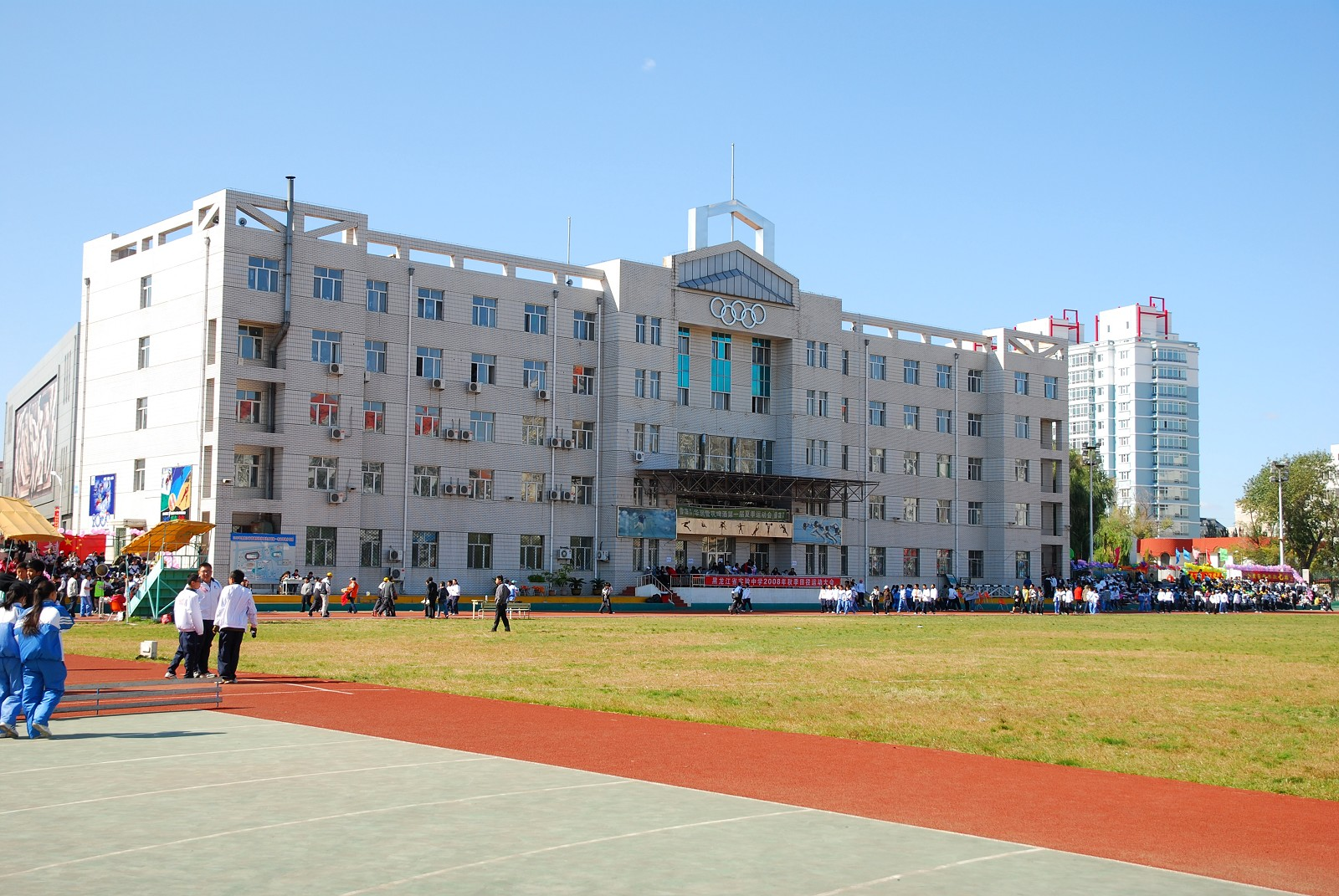
Division B of the 2018 Bandy World Championship was played at the Harbin Sport University Stadium.

As the center of winter sports in China, Harbin has hosted the 1996 Winter Asian Games, the 2009 Winter Universiade and the 2025 Asian Winter Games. Along these events, many famous winter sports athletes come from Harbin. Olympic medalists include short track star Wang Meng (six-time medalist); long track skater Zhang Hong (2014 Sochi, gold medal); and pairs figure skaters Shen Xue and Zhao Hongbo (2002 Salt Lake City, bronze medal; 2006 Turin, bronze medal; and 2010 Vancouver, gold medal), Zhang Dan and Zhang Hao (2006 Turin, silver medal), Pang Qing and Tong Jian (2010 Vancouver, silver medal), and Sui Wenjing and Han Cong (2022 Beijing, gold medal; 2018 Pyeongchang, silver medal).

Harbin has an indoor speed skating arena, the Heilongjiang Indoor Rink. Opened in 1995, it is the oldest one of seven in China.

Mutual cooperation of the Far Eastern State Academy of Physical Culture and the Harbin Institute of Physical Education started an exchange of sports and cultural delegations, holding of sports, training of Chinese students in Khabarovsk, Russia and Harbin. Russian side started to have plans to introduce bandy to China while Harbin has good preconditions to become one of the strong points of this sport in China. The national team is based in Harbin, and it was confirmed in advance that they would play in the 2015 Bandy World Championship. The Chinese team came 16th in a field of 17 teams, edging out Somalia. Mr Zhu, president of the sport university, is a member of the Federation of International Bandy council. In December 2017, an international student tournament will be played. While Chinese bandy is still in its initial stages, it is expected that Harbin even more will become the driving force behind the domestic development, for example via opening the Federation of International Bandy office for development and promotion in Asia.

Heilongjiang Ice City Football Club currently play their home soccer matches at Harbin International Conference Exhibition and Sports Center, a 50000-seater stadium. The team gained promotion to China's second tier for the 2018 season when they came first in the 2017 China League Two division.

KRS Heilongjiang are a professional ice hockey team based in the city. A member of the Russian-based Supreme Hockey League and one of two Chinese teams in the league. The team is affiliated with the Kontinental Hockey League side, also based in China, HC Kunlun Red Star.

An indoor ski resort opened in Harbin in 2017 and laid claim to be the world's largest of its kind, providing year round facility for downhill skiing.

=== Events ===
Videovisit to Harbin.

The 1996 Asian Winter Games were held in Harbin. While ice games were mainly held in Harbin city, the skiing events were held in Yabuli ski resort, Shangzhi City. In the frame of this campaign to assert its role on the world scene, Harbin hosted the 2009 Winter Universiade. Local Government spent 3.6 billion yuan for this event, with 2.63 billion used in construction and renovation of its sport infrastructure for this Universiade.

Harbin hosted the Asian Basketball Confederation Championship in 2003, in which China won the championship on their home court for the thirteenth time.

Harbin bid to host the 2010 Winter Olympics, which was ultimately awarded to Vancouver, Canada.

The second China-Russia University Winter Sports Carnival was inaugurated 12 December 2017. This marked the first international bandy in Harbin. The Russian participation came from DVGAFK in Khabarovsk among men and IrGTU in Irkutsk among women.

Being the national centre of bandy, Harbin organised Division B of the 2018 Bandy World Championship and China improved its placing to 12th from a total field of 16 teams.

== Transport ==
=== Railway ===
Railway system in Northeast China

Located at the junction of "T-style" mainline system, Harbin is an important railway hub of the Northeast China Region. Harbin Railway Bureau is the first Railway Bureau established by People's Republic of China Government, of which the railway density is the highest in China. Five conventional rail lines radiate from Harbin to: Beijing (Jingha Line), Suifenhe (Binsui Line), Manzhouli (Binzhou Line), Beian (Binbei Line) and Lalin (Labin Line). In addition, Harbin has a high-speed rail line linking Dalian, Northeast China's southernmost seaport. In 2009, construction began on the new Harbin West Railway Station with 18 platforms, located on the southwestern part of the city. In December 2012, the station was opened, as China unveiled its first high-speed rail running through regions with extremely low winter temperatures. with scheduled runs from Harbin to Dalian. The weather-proof CRH380B bullet trains serving the line can accommodate temperatures from minus 40 °C to 40 °C above zero. China's most northerly high-speed railway, Harbin–Qiqihar Intercity Railway, opened for revenue service on 17 August 2015. The rail links three largest principal cities in Heilongjiang including Harbin, Daqing and Qiqihar. Harbin–Jiamusi and Harbin–Mudanjiang Intercity railways both opened for public service in 2018, connecting the provincial capital to major prefectural level cities Mudanjiang and Jiamusi.

The city's main railway stations are the Harbin Railway Station, which was first built in 1899 and expanded in 1989. The main station is rebuilt in 2017, and now is still under construction; the Harbin East Railway Station, which opened in 1934; and the Harbin West Railway Station, which was built into the city's high-speed railway station in 2012. Another main station, Harbin North Railway Station, opened for public service in 2015, along with new built Harbin-Qiqihar Passenger Railway.

Direct passenger train service is available from Harbin Railway Station to large cities including Beijing, Shanghai, Tianjin, Guangzhou, Jinan, Nanjing and many other major cities in China. Direct high-speed railway service began operation between Harbin West and Shanghai Hongqiao stations on 28 December 2013, and shorten the journey time to 12 hours.

Harbin railway system

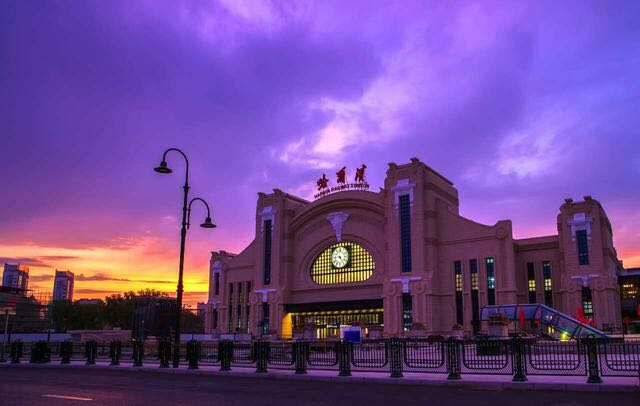
North terminal of Harbin Railway Station

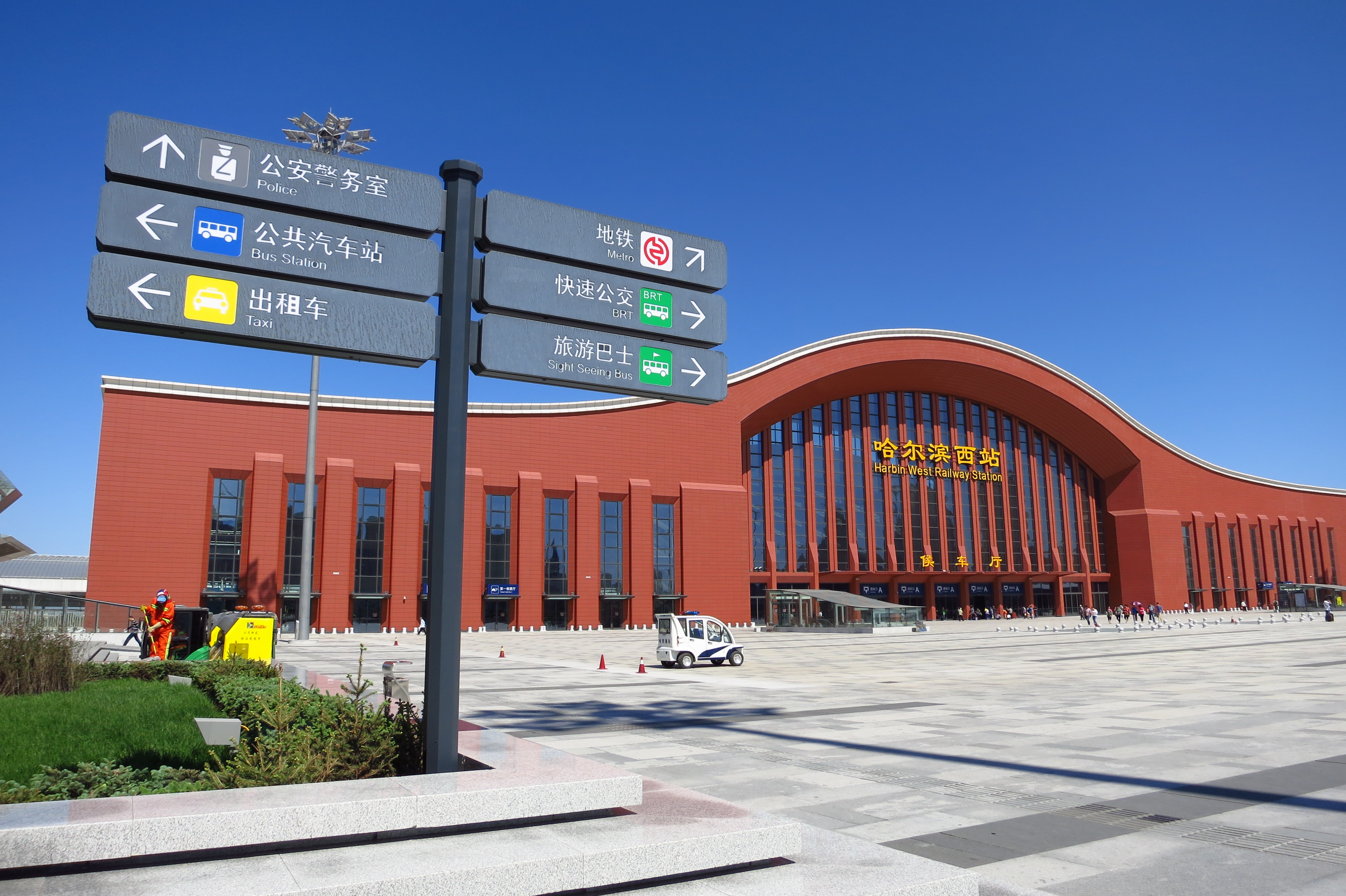
Harbin West Railway Station

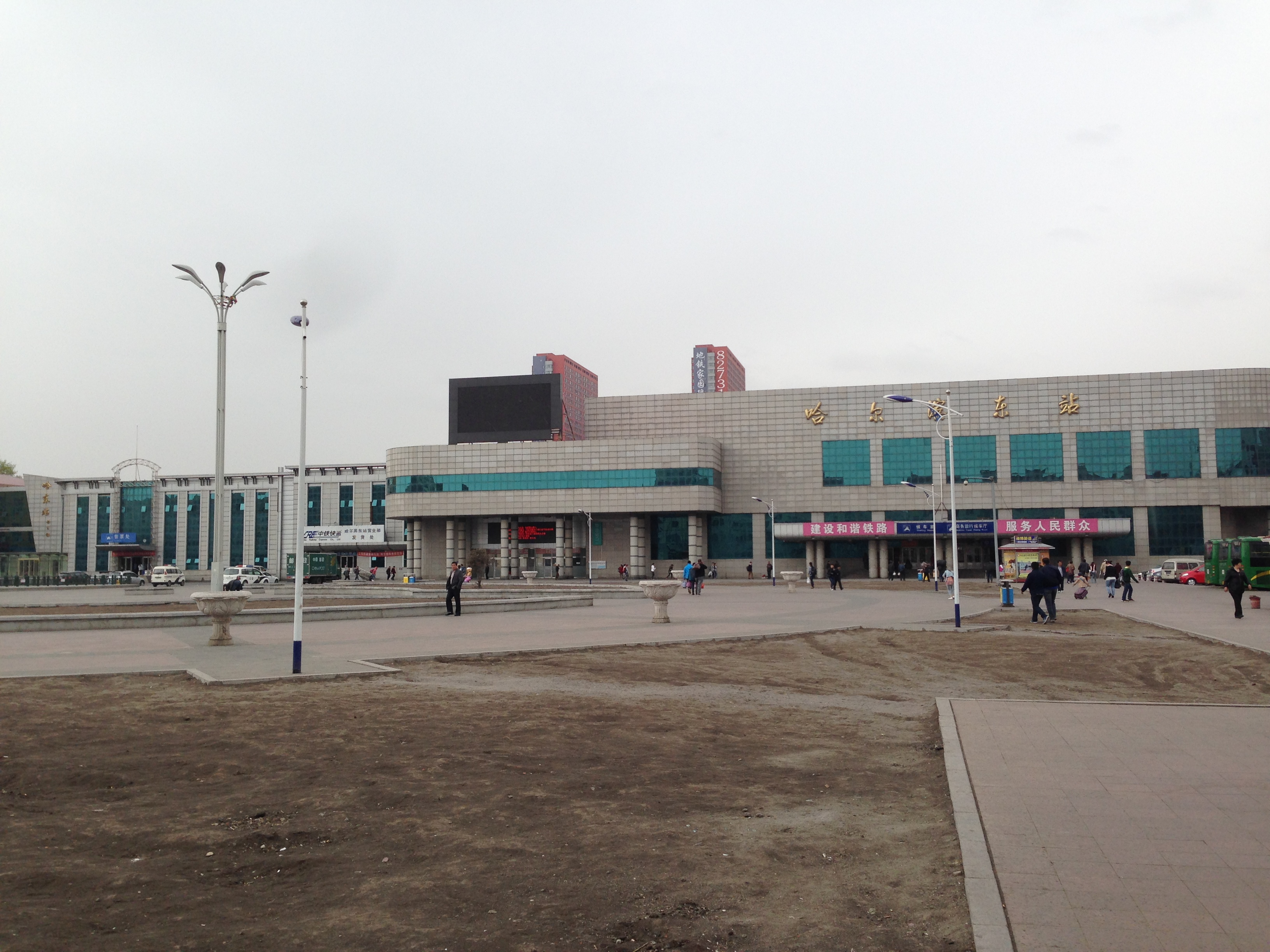
Harbin East Railway Station

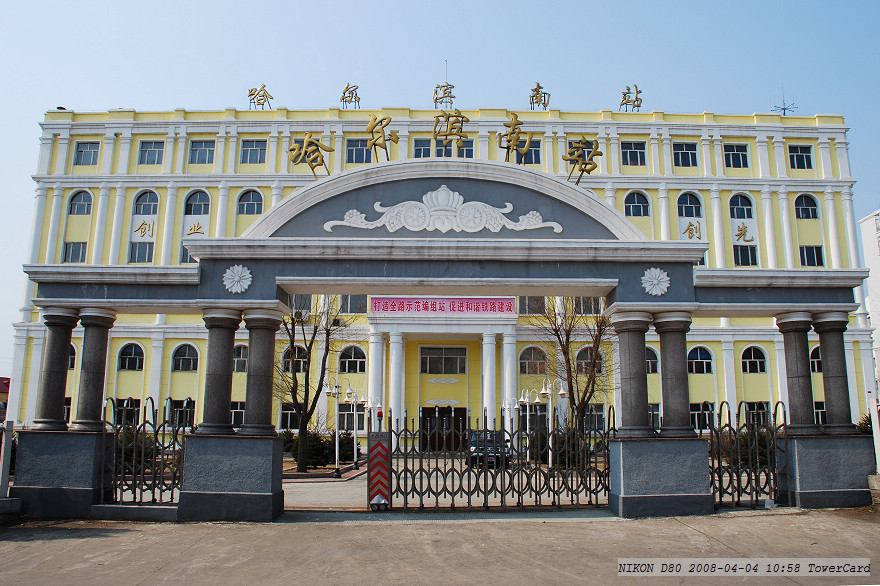
Harbin South Railway Station

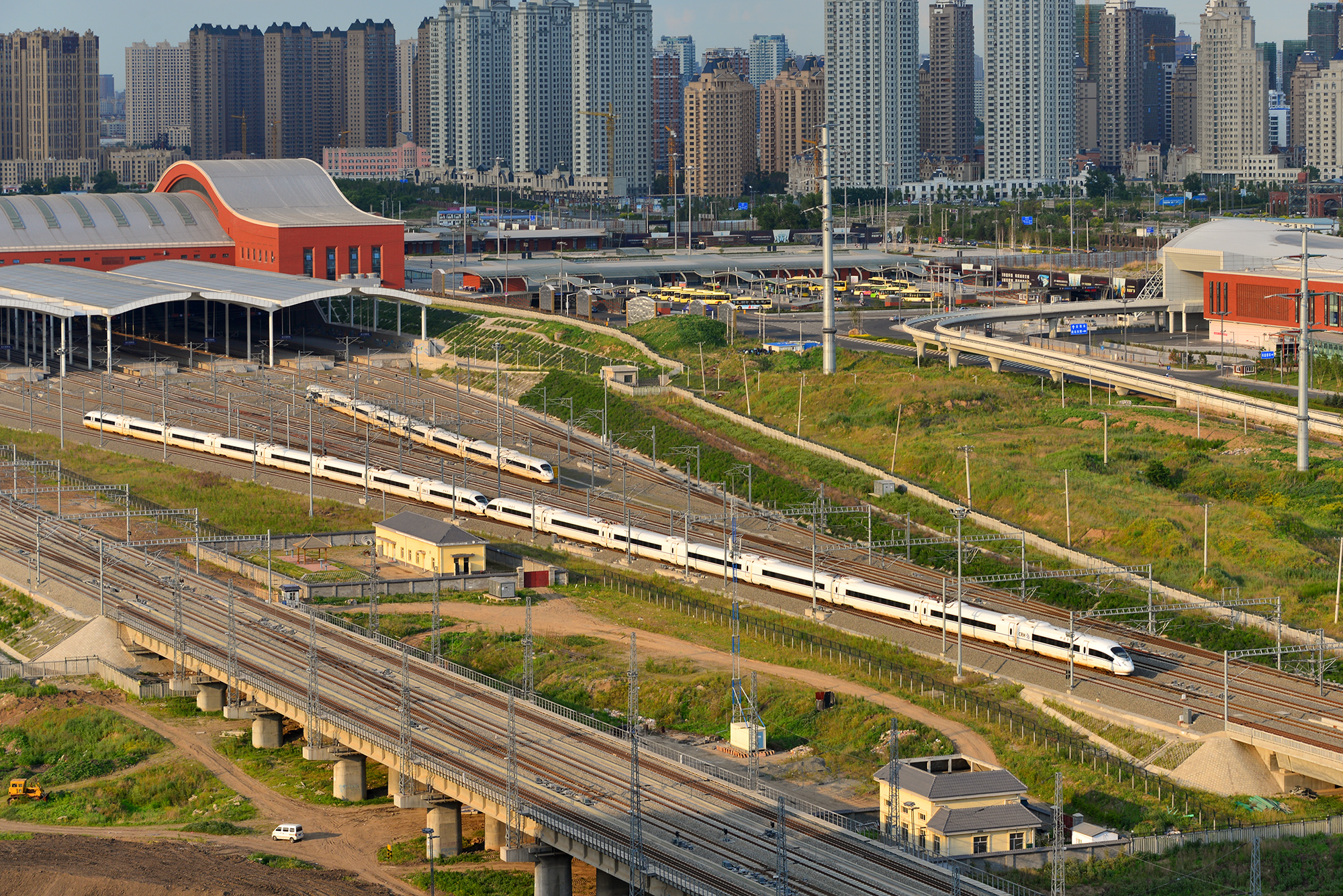
A CRH High-Speed train enters Harbin West railway station.

=== Road ===
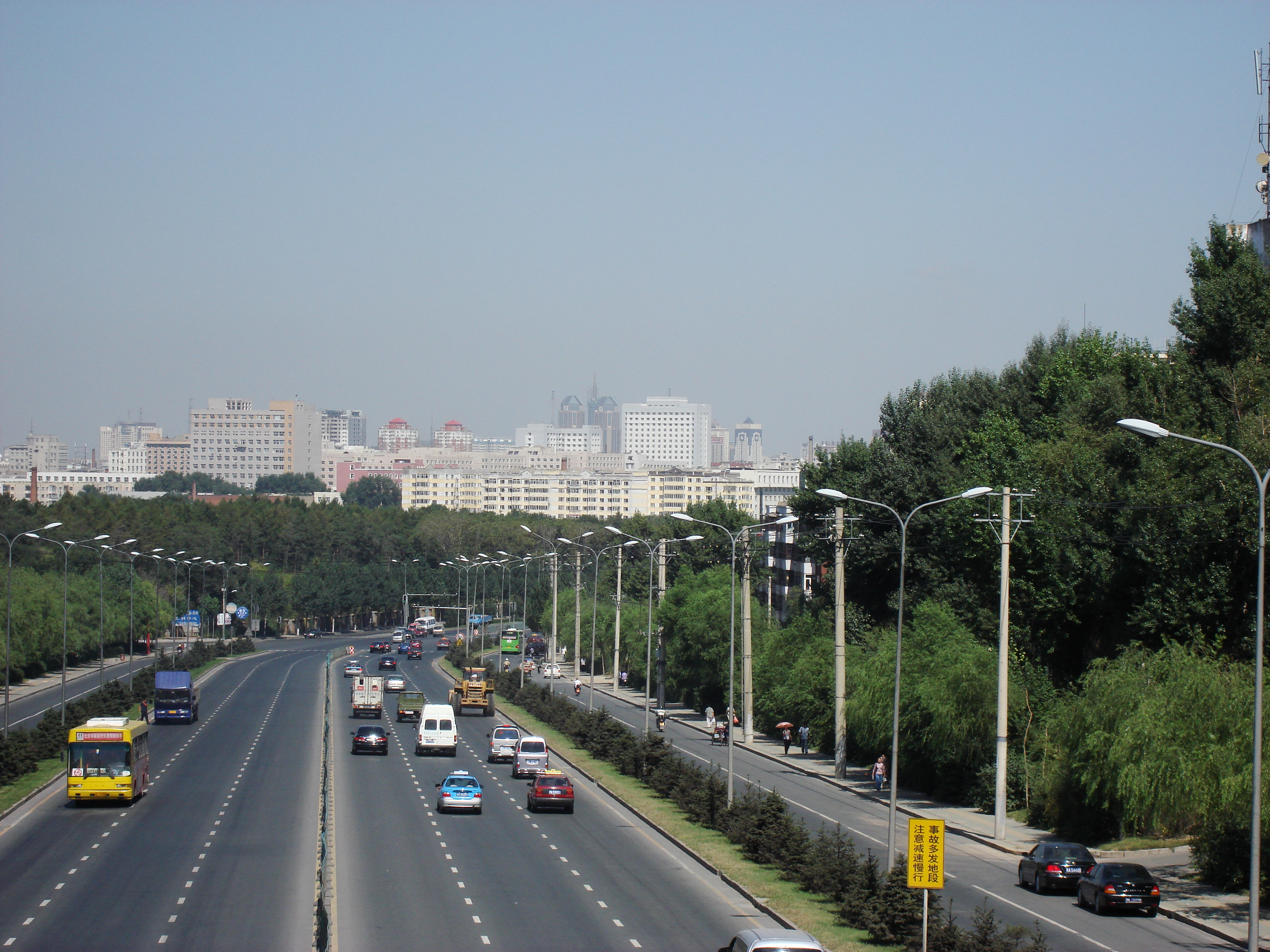
Haping road, one of the main municipal roads in the south of Harbin

As an important regional hub in Northeast China, Harbin has an advanced highway system. Major highways that pass through or terminate in Harbin include the Beijing–Harbin, Heihe–Dalian, Harbin–Tongjiang, Changchun–Harbin, and Manzhouli–Suifenhe highways.

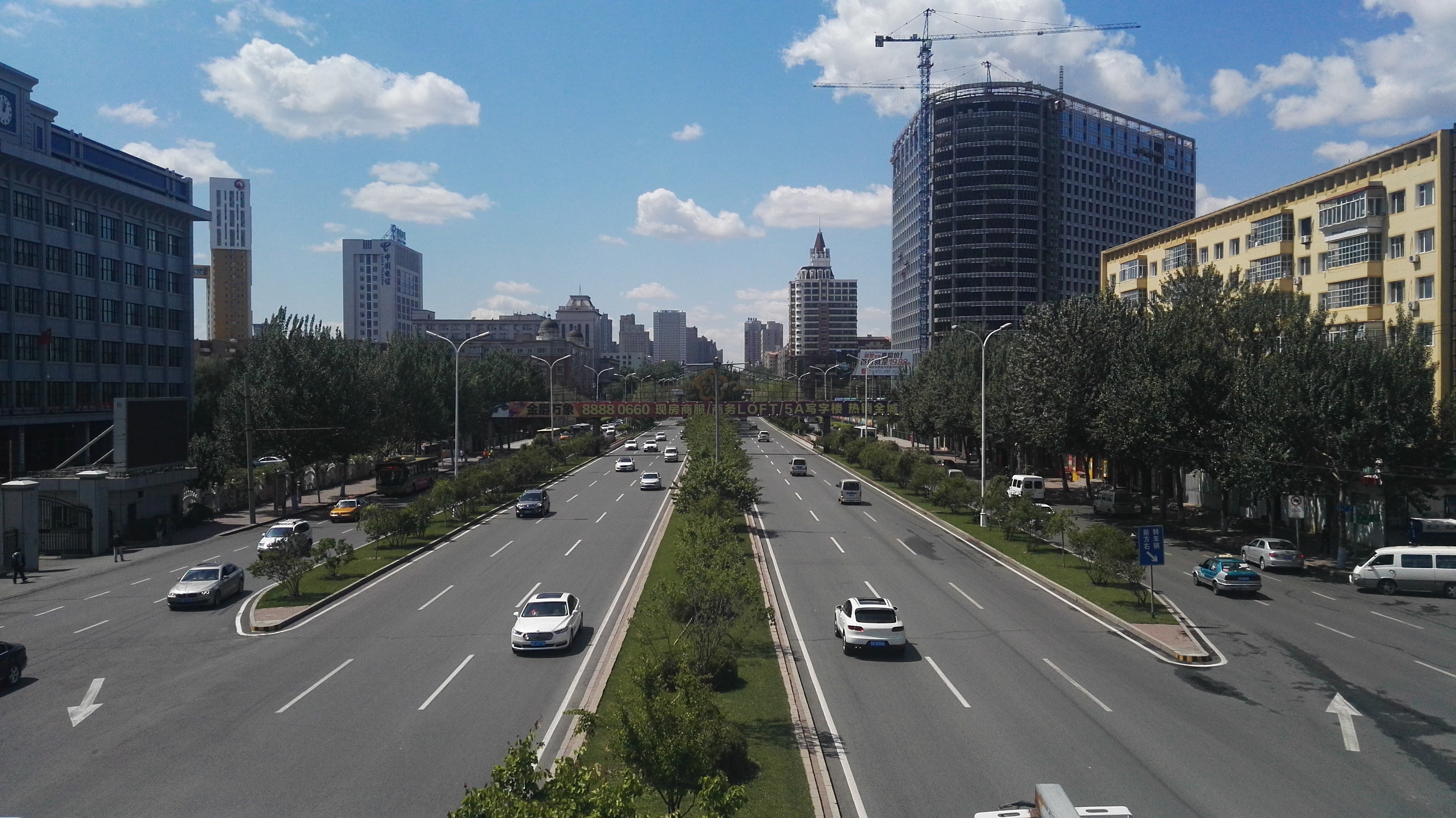
Hexing Road, western part of Harbin's 2nd ring road

- G1 Beijing–Harbin Expressway
- G10 Suifenhe–Manzhouli Expressway
- G1001 Harbin Ring Expressway
- G1011 Harbin–Tongjiang Expressway, a spur of G10 that extends west to Tongjiang, formerly part of China National Highway 010
- G1111 Hegang–Harbin Expressway, a spur of G11 Hegang–Dalian Expressway
- G1211 Jilin–Heihe Expressway, a spur of G12 Hunchun–Ulanhot Expressway that extends north to Heihe
- China National Highway 102
- China National Highway 202
- China National Highway 221
- China National Highway 222
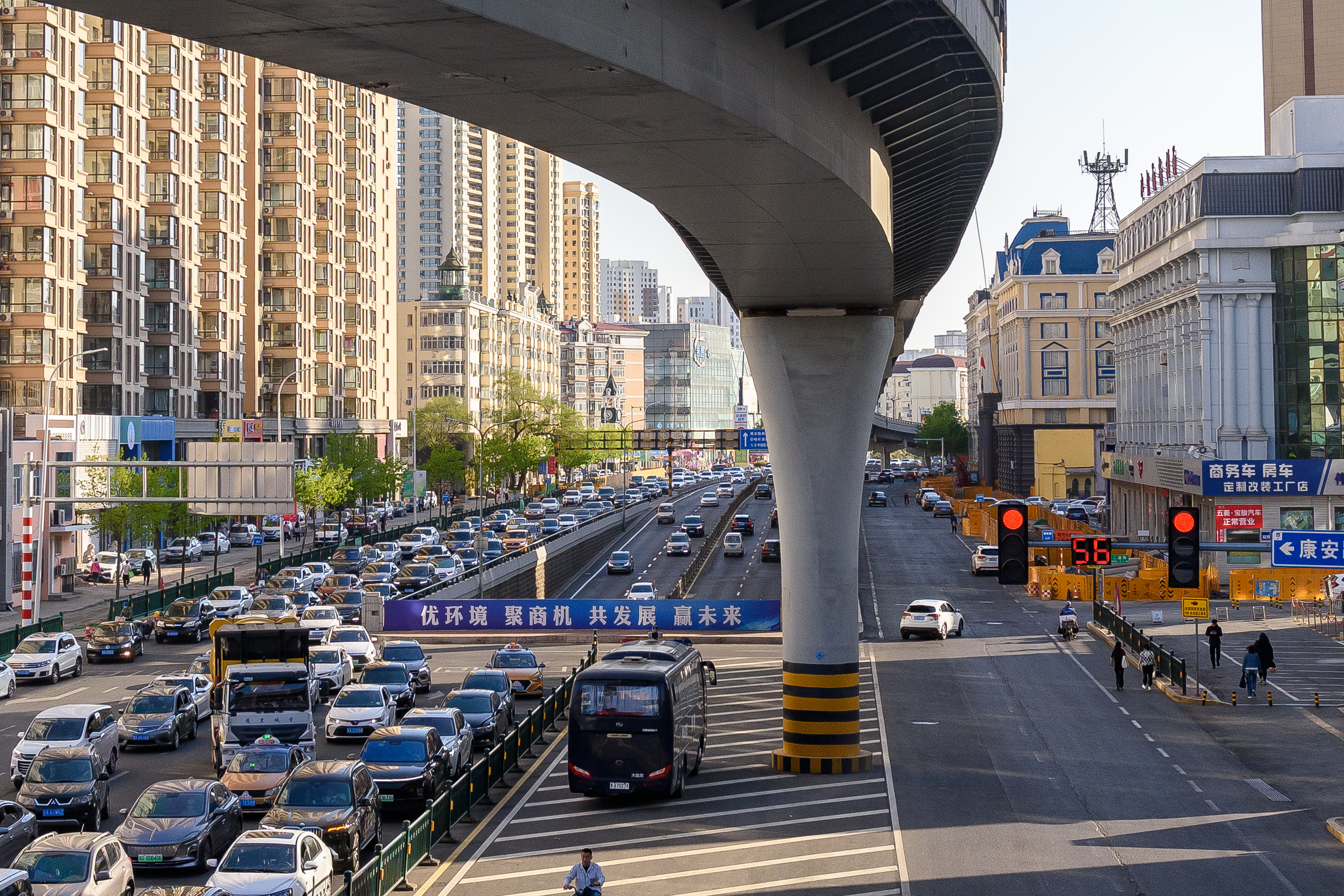
- Edmonton Rd at Kang'an Rd, Harbin 2024
  China National Highway 301

=== Air ===
Harbin Taiping International Airport, which is 35 kilometres (22 miles) away from the urban area of Harbin, is the second largest international airport in Northeast China. The technical level of flight district is 4E, which allows all kinds of large and medium civil aircraft. There are flights to over thirty large cities including Beijing, Tianjin, Shanghai, Nanjing, Qingdao, Wenzhou, Xiamen, Guangzhou, Shenzhen, Shenyang, Dalian, Xi'an and Hong Kong. In addition there are also scheduled international flights between Harbin and Russia, Singapore, Malaysia and South Korea. In June 2015, The first LCC international air routes to Japan, specifically the city of Nagoya was to begin. Because of the freight capability limitation, construction of the T2 Terminal began on 31 October 2014. The 160,000-square-meter T2 Terminal was scheduled to be finished in 2017, and will increase the freight capacity of the airport to three times of the previous. Harbin is also working on T3 which would be shaped like a snow flake, signifying Harbin as an ice city famous for their annual International Ice & Snow Sculpture Festival which places during the heavy winter season.

=== Metro ===
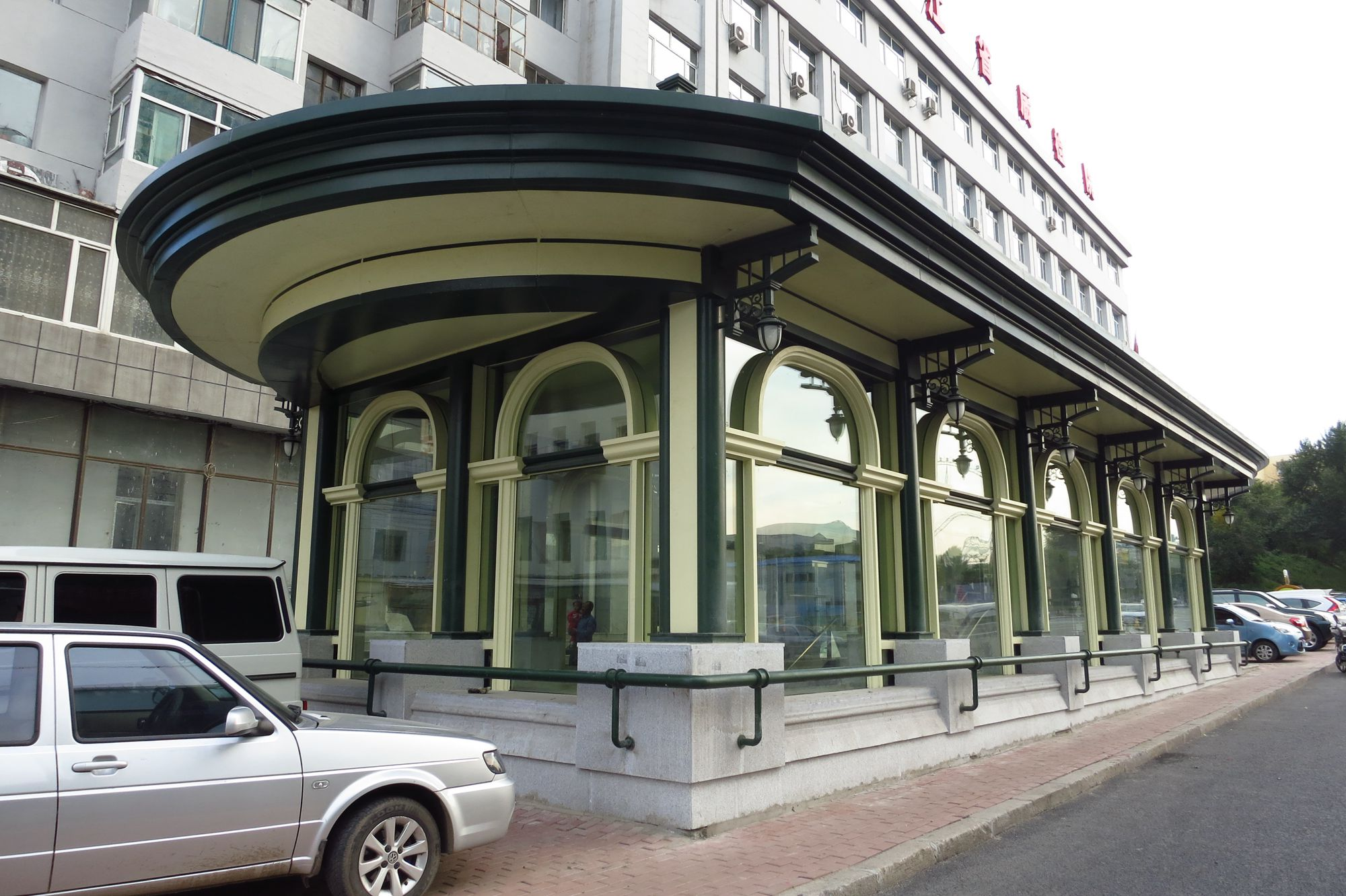
Entrance of Taipingqiao Station of Line 1, Harbin Metro

Construction of Harbin Metro started on 5 December 2006. The total investment for the first phase of Line 1 is RMB5.89 billion. Twenty stations were planned to be set on this 17.73 km (11.02 mi) long line starting from Harbin East Railway Station to the 2nd Affiliated Hospital of Harbin Medical University in the west of the city. A metro depot, a command centre and two transformer substations will be built along the line. Most of the line's route follows the air defence evacuation tunnel left from the "7381" Project, which started in 1973 and ended in 1979. The 7381 project was intended to protect Harbin from the former Soviet Union's possible invasion or nuclear attack.

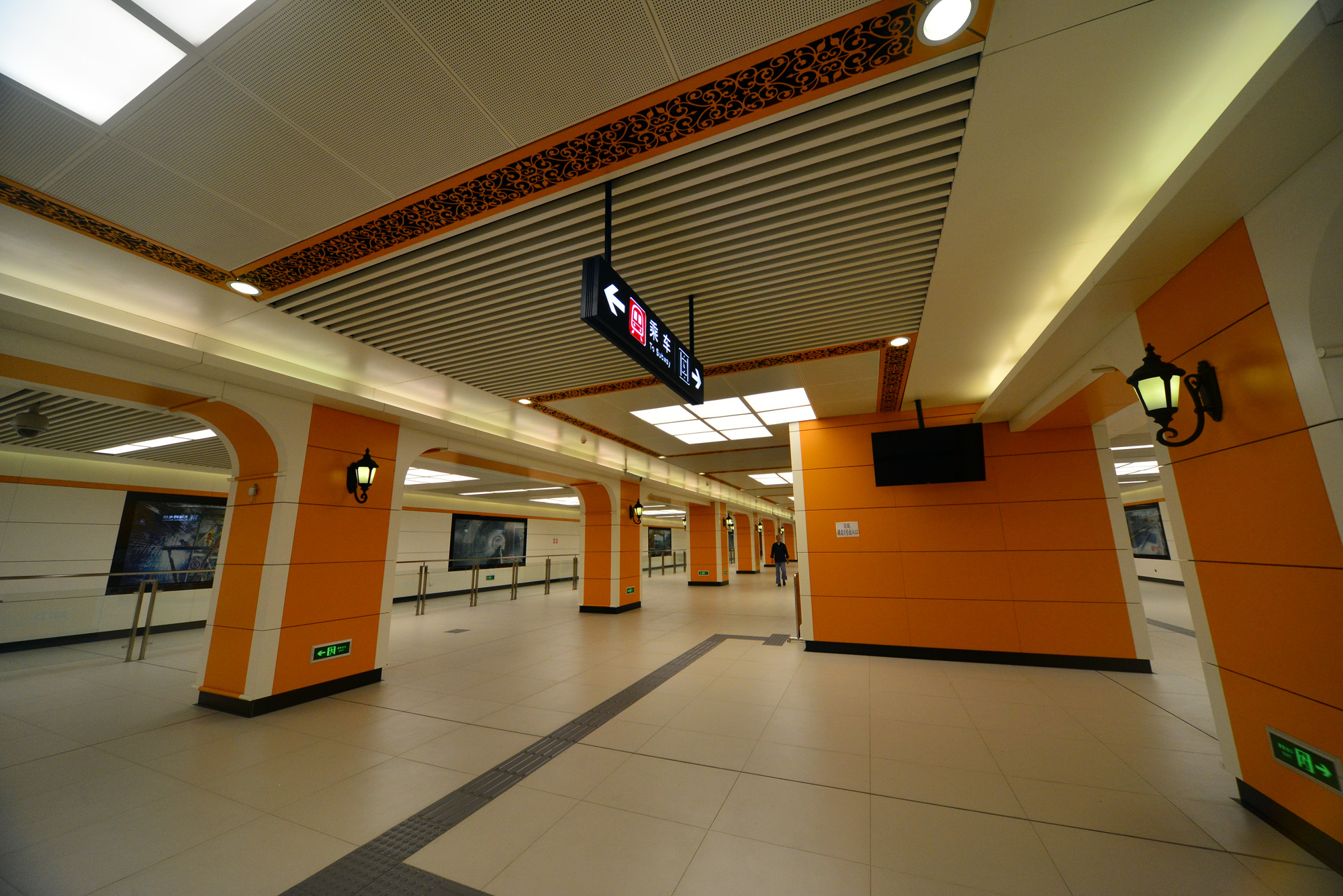
Yidaeryuan (2nd Affiliated Hospital of Harbin Medical University) Station, interchange station between Line 1 and Line 3

The Line 1 of Harbin Metro opened on 26 September 2013. It is oriented along the east–west axis of the urban area of Harbin: from north-east (Harbin East Railway Station) to south-west (2nd Affiliated Hospital of Harbin Medical University). Line 2 and Line 3 are under construction. Line 2 runs from Songbei District to Xiangfang District and ringlike Line 3 runs through Daoli, Daowai, Nangang and Xiangfang Districts of Harbin. On 26 January 2017, Phase I of Line 3 opened for public service. Line 3 links Harbin West Railway Station to Yidaeryuan Station, the transfer station between Line 1 and Line 3. In the long term, the city plans to build nine radiating metro lines and a circle line in downtown and some suburban districts, which account for 340 km (211.3 mi) by 2025.

Picture References:

- "7381" Project, a Civil Defense System in Harbin
- Harbin Metro Map, Line 1

=== Ports and waterways ===
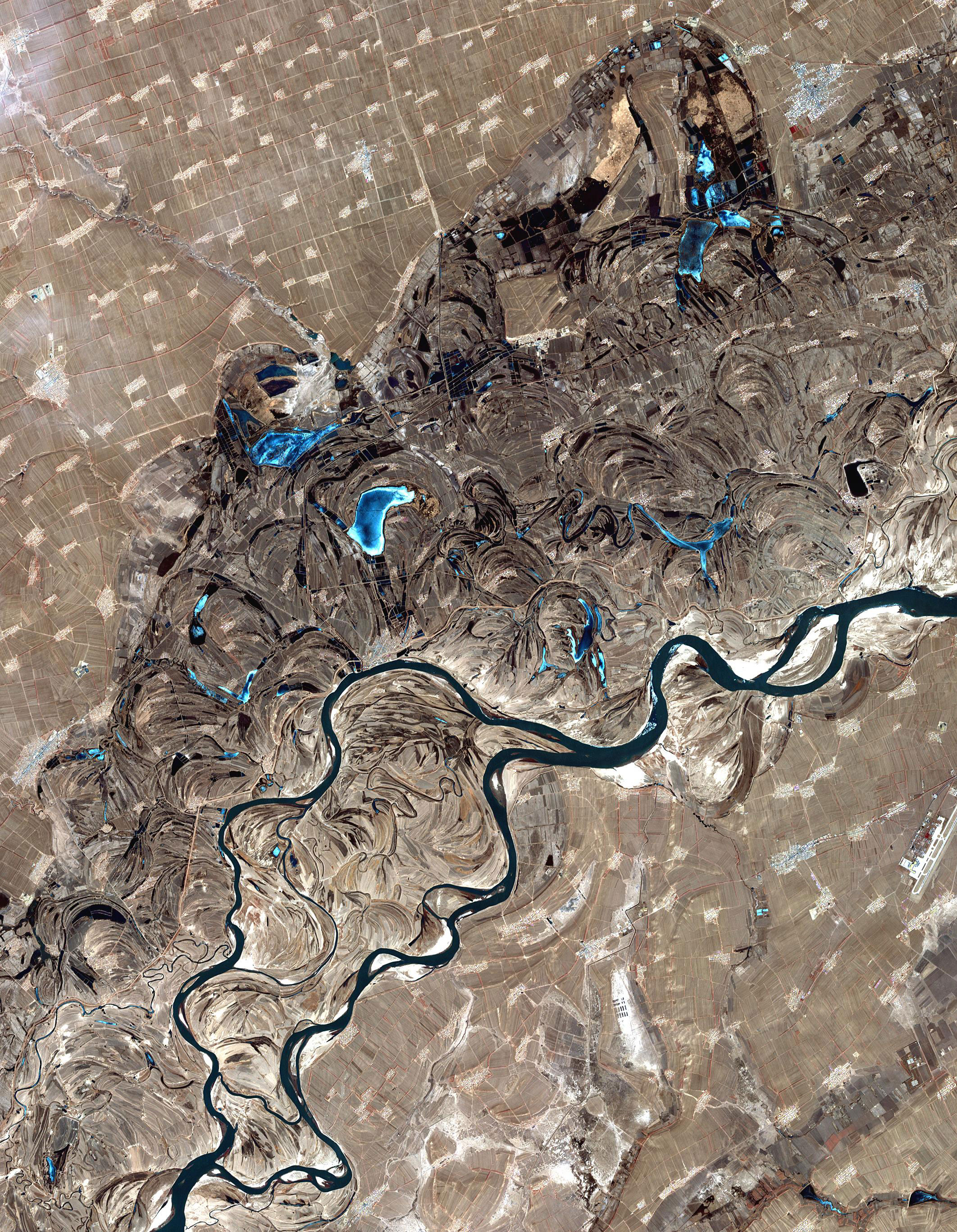
Songhua River

There are more than 1,900 rivers in Heilongjiang, including the Songhua River, Heilong River and Wusuli River, creating a convenient system of waterway transportation. Harbin harbor is one of eight inland ports in China and the largest of its type in Northeast China. Available from mid-April until the beginning of November, passenger ships sail from Harbin up the Songhua River to Qiqihar, or downstream to Jiamusi, Tongjiang, and Khabarovsk in Russia.

== Education and research ==
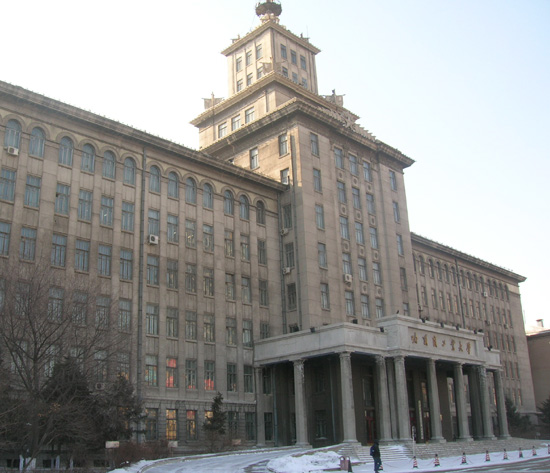
The main building of Harbin Institute of Technology. Note the Stalinist "tier-cake" façade, reminiscent of the "Seven Sisters" in Moscow.

Harbin is one of the top 50 cities and metropolitan areas in the world by scientific research output as tracked by the Nature Index. As of 2026, the QS Best Student Cities Rankings ranked Harbin as the best city in Northeast China and 129th globally, making it an important hub for international students.

As Harbin serves as an important military industrial base after PRC's foundation, it is home to several key universities mainly focused on the science and technology service of national military and aerospace industry. Soviet experts played an important role in many education projects in this period. Due to the threat of possible war with the Soviet Union, however, several colleges were moved southwards to Changsha, Chongqing, and several other southern cities in China in the 1960s. Some of these colleges were returned to Harbin in the 1970s.

The city hosts several major universities in Northeast China, including Harbin Institute of Technology, Harbin Engineering University, Harbin Medical University, Northeast Agricultural University, Harbin University of Science and Technology, Harbin Normal University, Northeast Forestry University, Harbin University, Heilongjiang University of Science and Technology, Heilongjiang University of Chinese Medicine, Harbin University of Commerce, Harbin Sport University, and Heilongjiang University.

Notably, Harbin Institute of Technology is consistently ranked as one of the best universities in the world for engineering. HIT was ranked fifth globally in the Best Global Universities for Engineering by U.S. News in 2022. Founded in 1920 with strong support by the Russian diaspora connected with the Chinese Eastern Railway, the university has developed into an important research university mainly focusing on engineering (e.g. in space science and defense-related technologies, welding technology and engineering), with supporting faculties in the sciences, management, humanities and social sciences. The institute's faculty and students contributed to and invented China's first analog computer, the first intelligent chess computer, and the first arc-welding robot. In 2010, research funding from the government, industry, and business sectors surpassed RMB1.13 billion, the second highest of any university in China.

== Military ==
Harbin is now headquarters of the 78th Group Army of the People's Liberation Army, one of the three group armies that comprise the Northern Theater Command responsible for defending China's northeastern borders with Russia, Mongolia and North Korea. 23rd Group Army of the PLA used to garrison in Harbin before it was disbanded in a cycle of reductions in 2003.

== International relations ==
Harbin has town twinning and similar arrangements with approximately 30 places around the world, as well as some other cities within China. For a list, see List of twin towns and sister cities in China → H.

In 2009 Harbin opened an International Sister Cities museum. It has 1,048 exhibits in 28 rooms, with a total area of 1,800 square metres (19,375 square feet).

On 3 September 2015, China and Russia signed an agreement to re-open the Russian consulate in Harbin, as the former Soviet consulate was closed in 1962 after the Sino-Soviet split. China will also establish a corresponding consulate in Vladivostok.

== Notable people ==
- Fu Tiegang (born 1953), Chinese former politician.
- Han Cong (born 1992), Chinese pair skater.
- He Xin (born 1996), Chinese ice hockey player and member of the China women's national ice hockey team.
- Jia Nailiang (born 1984), Chinese actor.
- Kang Wang (born 1988), opera singer, tenor.
- I. Michael Lerner (1910–1977), American geneticist, born in Harbin.
- Li Bingbing (born 1973), Chinese actress and singer.
- Li Haitao (politician) (born 1963), Chinese former politician.
- Lin Hu (1927–2018), Russian-Chinese aviator, fighter pilot and lieutenant general of the People's Liberation Army Air Force (PLAAF).
- Liu He (born 1961), highly accomplished Chinese engineer.
- Simu Liu (born 1989), Chinese-Canadian actor.
- Ma Fanshu (born 1993), Chinese television host.
- Ma Su (born 1981), Chinese actress.
- Ningning (born 2002), Chinese singer, member of the South Korean girl group Aespa.
- Qiao Jie (born 1964), Chinese obstetrician, reproductive physician and biologist, current president of Peking University Third Hospital.
- Ren Ziwei (born 1997), Chinese short track speed skater.
- Song Jia (born 1980), Chinese actress and singer.
- Song Xibin (born 1963), Chinese former politician.
- Song Yadong (born 1997), Chinese mixed martial artist who competes in the Bantamweight division of the UFC.
- Sui Wenjing (born 1995), Chinese pair skater.
- Sun Honglei (born 1970), Chinese actor.
- Sun Rui (born 1995), Chinese singer, dancer, and actress.
- Wang Bin (born 1958), Chinese former business executive and senior economist.
- Witold Gerutto (1912–1973), Polish athlete, born in Harbin.
- Wuheqilin (born 1988), Chinese illustrator and political cartoonist.
- Xu Binshi (1931–2023), Chinese engineer.
- Xu Dongdong (born 1990), Chinese actress, singer and model.
- Zhang Xiyan (born 1980), Chinese female boxer.

== See also ==
- Chinese Baroque Street
- Dragon man
- Harbin Ferris Wheel
- Harbin Siberian Tiger Park
- List of cities in the People's Republic of China by population
- List of colleges and universities in Harbin
- List of current and former capitals of subnational entities of China
- List of universities and colleges in Heilongjiang
