= List of colleges and universities in Harbin =

This is a list of current universities and colleges in Harbin, Heilongjiang, China.

#	Short	English name	Chinese name	Type	District of Harbin	Campus (OSM ID)	Year est.
	HLJU*	Heilongjiang University	黑龙江大学	Provincial	Nangang 150080	300642455	1941/58
02	HIT	Harbin Institute of Technology	哈尔滨工业大学	National (Other)	Hulan		1920
	HUST	Harbin University of Science and Technology	哈尔滨理工大学	Provincial	Nangang	9387134; Rongcheng	1950
04	HEU	Harbin Engineering University	哈尔滨工程大学	National (Other)	Nangang 150001	340788060	1953
	HLJUST*	Heilongjiang University of Science and Technology	黑龙江理工大学	Provincial			
	NEAU	Northeast Agricultural University	东北农业大学	Provincial	Xiangfang		1948
	NEFU	Northeast Forestry University	东北林业大学	National (Direct)	Xiangfang 150040	316890410	
	HMU*	Harbin Medical University	哈尔滨医科大学	Provincial			
09	HUCM*	Heilongjiang University of Chinese Medicine	黑龙江中医药大学	Provincial			
10	HNU*	Harbin Normal University	哈尔滨师范大学	Provincial	Hulan	385368829	1951
11	HU*	Harbin University	哈尔滨学院	Provincial			
12	HUC*	Harbin University of Commerce	哈尔滨商业大学	Provincial	Songbei; Daoli	North; South	1952
	HSU*	Harbin Sport University	哈尔滨体育学院	Provincial			
	HFU*	Harbin Finance University	哈尔滨金融学院	Provincial			
15	HLJIT*	Heilongjiang Institute of Technology	黑龙江工程学院	Provincial	Daowai 150050; Nangang150008	East; West	1952
16	HIU*	Heilongjiang International University	黑龙江外国语学院	Private	Hulan LDZ 150025	385368830	
17	HUFE*	Heilongjiang University of Finance and Economic	黑龙江财经学院	Private		642650791	2000
18	HIP*	Harbin Institute of Petroleum	哈尔滨石油学院	Provincial	Songbei 150028	385368831	
	HCU*	Harbin Cambridge University	哈尔滨剑桥学院	Private			
	KTC*	Kunlun Tourism College, Heilongjiang Institute of Technology	黑龙江工程学院昆仑旅游学院	Private			
21	HGC*	Harbin Guangsha College	哈尔滨广厦学院	Private	LDZ	385368828	
	HHU*	Harbin Huade University	哈尔滨华德学院	Private			
23	HCOM*	Harbin Conservatory of Music	哈尔滨音乐学院	Provincial	Songbei	675540778	
24	HICT*	Heilongjiang Institute of Construction Technology	黑龙江建筑职业技术学院			385366307	1948
25	HVIEE*	Heilongjiang Vocational Institute of Ecological Engineering	黑龙江生态工程职业学院		Hulan LDZ	385366305	2004
26	HIT*	Harbin Institute of Technology (Shenzhen)	哈尔滨工业大学深圳校区				

== See also ==
- List of universities and colleges in Heilongjiang
- List of universities in China
