= Heilongjiang (disambiguation) =

Heilongjiang may refer to:

- Dragon Tower, also known as Long Ta or Heilongjiang Tower
- Heilongjiang, a province in Northeast China
- Heilongjiang Dragons
- Heilongjiang hand cannon, a bronze hand cannon
- Heilongjiang Ice City F.C.
- Heilongjiang International University, a university located in Harbin, Heilongjiang Province
- Heilongjiang Morning Post
- Heilongjiang River, also known as Amur
- Heilongjiang Television Station
- Heilongjiang University, a national university in the city of Harbin, Heilongjiang Province
- Heilongjiang University of Science and Technology
- Heilongjiang University of Technology
