= List of universities and colleges in Heilongjiang =

The following is List of Universities and Colleges in Heilongjiang.

Name	Chinese name	Type	Location
Heilongjiang University	黑龙江大学	Provincial	Harbin
Harbin Institute of Technology	哈尔滨工业大学	National (Other)	Harbin
Harbin University of Science and Technology	哈尔滨理工大学	Provincial	Harbin
Harbin Engineering University	哈尔滨工程大学	National (Other)	Harbin
Heilongjiang University of Science and Technology	黑龙江理工大学	Provincial	Harbin
Northeast Petroleum University	东北石油大学	Provincial	Daqing
Jiamusi University	佳木斯大学	Provincial	Jiamusi
Heilongjiang Bayi Agricultural University	黑龙江八一农垦大学	Provincial	Daqing
Northeast Agricultural University	东北农业大学	Provincial	Harbin
Northeast Forestry University	东北林业大学	National (Direct)	Harbin
Harbin Medical University	哈尔滨医科大学	Provincial	Harbin
Heilongjiang University of Chinese Medicine	黑龙江中医药大学	Provincial	Harbin
Mudanjiang Medical University	牡丹江医学院	Provincial	Mudanjiang
Harbin Normal University	哈尔滨师范大学	Provincial	Harbin
Qiqihar University	齐齐哈尔大学	Provincial	Qiqihar
Mudanjiang Normal University	牡丹江师范学院	Provincial	Mudanjiang
Harbin University	哈尔滨学院	Provincial	Harbin
Daqing Normal University	大庆师范学院	Provincial	Daqing
Suihua University	绥化学院	Provincial	Suihua
Harbin University of Commerce	哈尔滨商业大学	Provincial	Harbin
Harbin Sport University	哈尔滨体育学院	Provincial	Harbin
Harbin Finance University	哈尔滨金融学院	Provincial	Harbin
Qiqihar Medical University	齐齐哈尔医学院	Provincial	Qiqihar
Heilongjiang University of Technology	黑龙江工业学院	Provincial	Jixi
East University of Heilongjiang	黑龙江东方学院	Private	Jixi
Heilongjiang Institute of Technology	黑龙江工程学院	Provincial	Harbin
Qiqihar Institute of Technology	齐齐哈尔工程学院	Private	Qiqihar
Heilongjiang International University	黑龙江外国语学院	Private	Harbin
Heilongjiang University of Finance and Economic	黑龙江财经学院	Private	Harbin
Harbin Institute of Petroleum	哈尔滨石油学院	Provincial	Harbin
Harbin Cambridge University	哈尔滨剑桥学院	Private	Harbin
Kunlun Tourism College, Heilongjiang Institute of Technology	黑龙江工程学院昆仑旅游学院	Private	Harbin
Harbin Guangsha College	哈尔滨广厦学院	Private	Harbin
Harbin Huade University	哈尔滨华德学院	Private	Harbin
Heihe University	黑河学院	Provincial	Heihe
Harbin Conservatory of Music	哈尔滨音乐学院	Provincial	Harbin
