= Xu Mengjia =

Chinese politician

- 徐孟加

Communist Party Secretary of Ya'an
- In office June 2006 – November 2013
- Preceded by: Hou Xiongfei (侯雄飞)
- Succeeded by: Ye Zhuang (叶壮)

Personal details
- Born: August 1957 (age 68) Yibin, Sichuan, China
- Party: Chinese Communist Party (1979–2013; expelled)
- Education: Qinghai University

Xu Mengjia (Chinese: 徐孟加; pinyin: Xú Mèngjiā; born August 1957) is a former Chinese politician who spent most of his career in Southwest China's Sichuan province. He was investigated by the Chinese Communist Party's anti-graft agency in December 2013. Previously he served as the Communist Party Secretary of Ya'an.

Xu was a member of the 17th and 18th National Congress of the Chinese Communist Party.

== Life and career ==
Xu was born and raised in Yibin, Sichuan.

During the Cultural Revolution, he became a sent-down youth in Qujing County and Gao County from June 1975 to August 1976.

In December 1976, he joined the People's Liberation Army, serving in 59035 Army.

He entered Qinghai University in September 1979, majoring in agriculture, where he graduated in July 1983. After college, he was assigned to 59076 Army, then worked in Quartermaster Department of the People's Liberation Army General Logistics Department.

He entered politics in January 1986, when he was transferred to Chengdu, capital of Sichuan province, and appointed as an official in Sichuan Provincial Office of Agriculture and Animal Husbandry and over a period of 11 years worked his way up to the position of Director of the Financial Department. From November 1994 to October 1996 he served as Deputy Communist Party Secretary of Jianyang. In January 1997 he was promoted to become the Director of Sichuan Provincial Aquatic Products Bureau, a position he held until December 2000.

In December 2000, he was transferred to Panzhihua, and served as the Deputy Communist Party Secretary. In July 2005, he was transferred again to Ya'an, he served as Deputy Communist Party Secretary of Ya'an from 2005 to 2006, and Communist Party Secretary, the top political position in the city, from June 2006 to November 2013.

In December 2013, state media announced that Xu would undergo investigation for "serious violations of law and discipline." Then he was dismissed from his post and expelled from the Chinese Communist Party. In January 2015, he was sentenced to 16 years in prison and confiscated his assets (200,000 yuan).

Party political offices
Preceded by Hou Xiongfei	Communist Party Secretary of Ya'an; 2006–2013	Succeeded by Ye Zhuang
