= List of universities and colleges in Qinghai =

The following is List of Universities and Colleges in Qinghai. As of 2012, there are 14 institutions of higher learning in the province, out of which 3 offer Bachelor's degree studies.

== Notation ==
The following notation is used:

- National (Direct): Directly administered by the Chinese Ministry of Education (MOE)
- National (Other): Administered by other ministries
- Ω (National Key Universities): Universities with high regards from the MOE and the Chinese government
- Provincial: Public university administered by the province (or the autonomous region)
- Municipal: Public university administered by the municipality
- Private: Privately owned and funded university, or independent institution
- Mainland-HMT: Mainland China-Hong Kong or Macao or Taiwan joint venture university
- Sino-foreign: Sino-foreign joint venture university

The default list should follow the neutral order provided by MOE, namely the numerical order of identification codes.

Note: The list is arranged in the default order followed the one provided by MOE

Name	Chinese name	Type	Location	Note
Qinghai University	青海大学	Provincial	Xining	Project 211 Ω
Qinghai Normal University	青海师范大学	Provincial	Xining	
Qinghai Nationalities University	青海民族大学	Provincial	Xining	
Kunlun College, Qinghai University	青海大学昆仑学院	Private	Xining	
