= SolSource =

Solar cooker brand

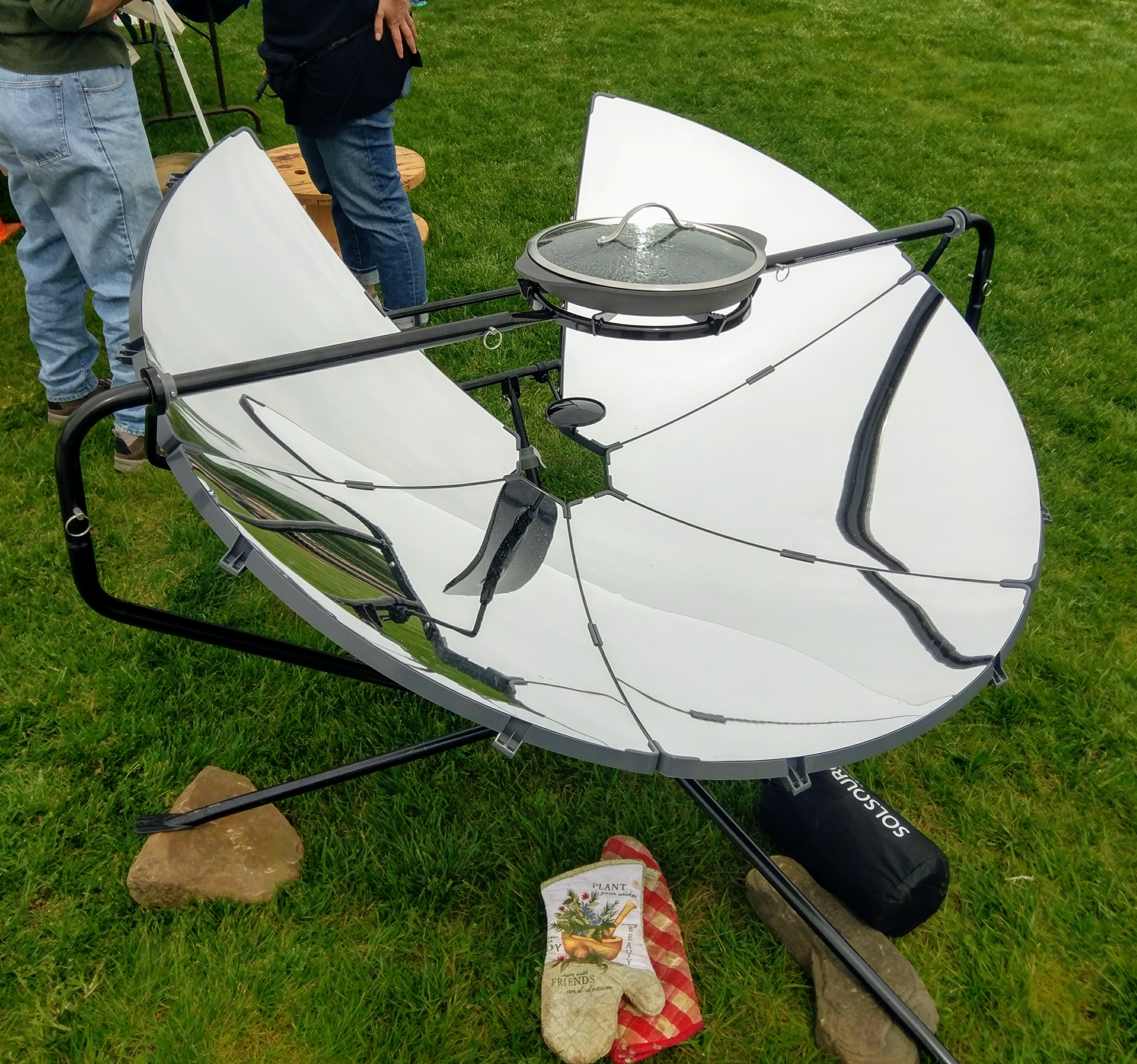
SolSource solar cooker

SolSource was a brand of solar cooker which used a parabolic mirror to concentrate solar energy onto the bottom of a cooking pot or pan. The cookers were manufactured by One Earth Designs. Initially marketed in rural China, the products were later sold worldwide.

== Research and development ==
The SolSource was originally developed by Scot Frank, a student at the Massachusetts Institute of Technology while studying household energy usage in remote parts of Tibet, Nepal, Bhutan and India, beginning in 2005. Original designs used indigenous materials such as fabric made of yak fur. By 2008, Frank had received a US $3000 grant from MIT to perfect his design. After graduation, Frank began teaching science at Qinghai University. He teamed up with Catlin Powers, a graduate of the Harvard School of Public Health to form One Earth Designs. Powers had done research on indoor air pollution on the Himalayan plateau caused by burning fuels for cooking and heating.

== Commercialization ==
In 2010, the project won an environmental prize of €500,000, equivalent to US $662,200, from the Nationale Postcode Loterij in the Netherlands. Prototypes of the SolSource could generate electricity at that time.

In 2011, US Ambassador to China Jon Huntsman Jr. said that the SolSource "could be significant to the U.S.-China relationship since clean energy will be a substantive aspect of our future bilateral priorities."

By 2012, the business was based in Hong Kong. Their business model included selling their products in remote western China, in cooperation with the Chinese government.

SolSource went into full production in 2012, initially distributed in the province of Qinghai on the Tibetan plateau. In 2013, the company began sales in the United States and other countries, following a successful Kickstarter campaign, focusing on the outdoor barbecue market.

In 2014, the company won a CleanEquity Monaco award, given by Albert II, Prince of Monaco to companies with "the greatest potential and most innovative technologies" in the clean energy field.

In 2017, the company introduced its second model, the smaller and less expensive SolSource Sport, again utilizing a Kickstarter campaign.

Powers became the company's CEO, and Scot Frank was an advisor.

The company secured $500,000 in funding from Mark Cuban in 2017 on season 9 of the Shark Tank reality TV show, but ceased commercial operations in 2019.

== Products ==
The original SolSource weighed 40 pounds (18 kilograms), and had a 51 inch (1.3 meter) diameter mirror. It was intended to be placed at ground level.

The SolSource Sport weighed 10 pounds (4.5 kilograms), and had a 30.5 inch diameter mirror. It was a tabletop unit.
