= Dongguan Mosque =

Mosque in Xining, Qinghai, China

- 东关清真大寺
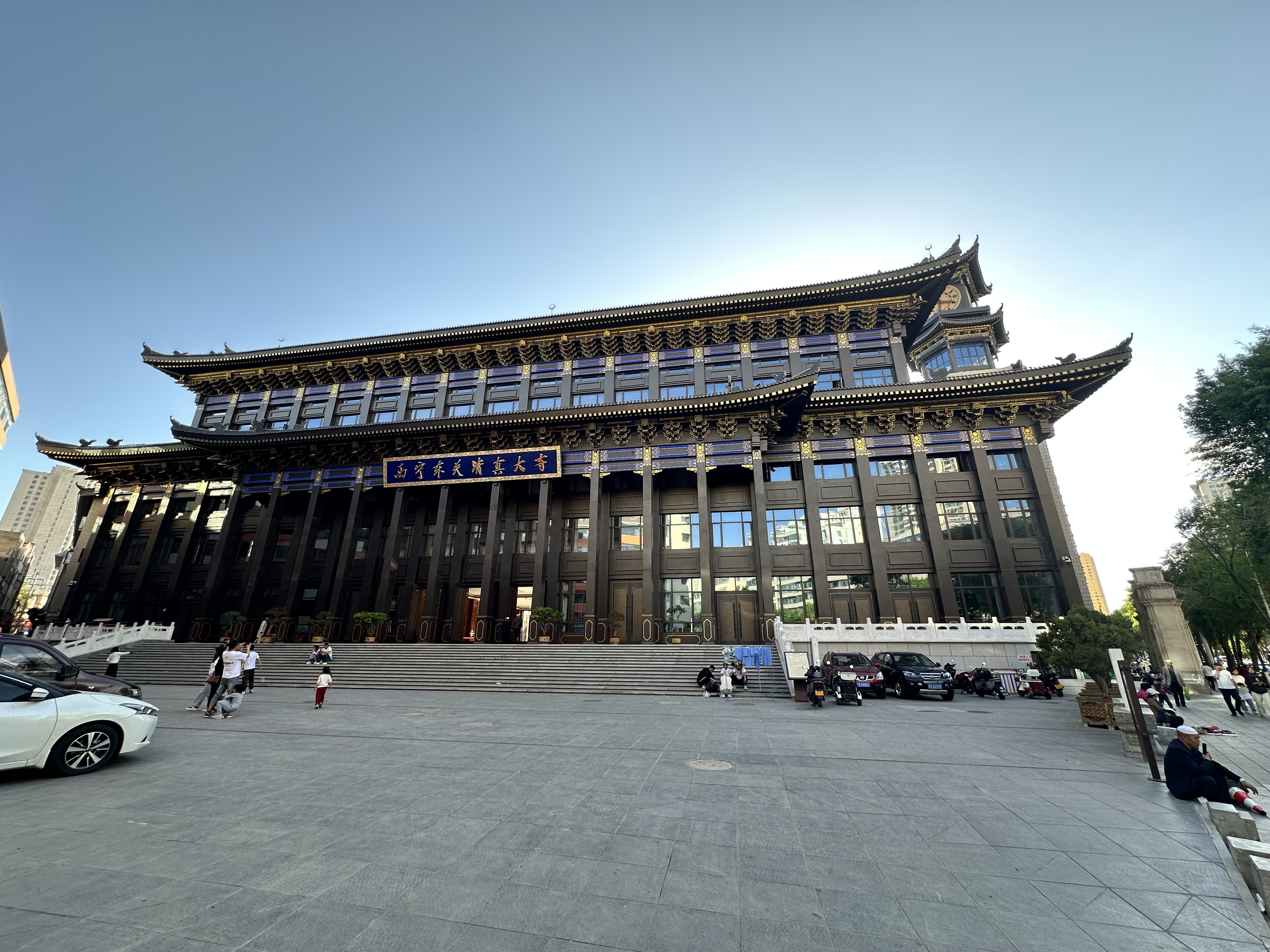
- The mosque in 2025

- Location of the mosque in Qinghai

Religion
- Affiliation: Sunni Islam
- Ecclesiastical or organizational status: Mosque
- Status: Active

Location
- Location: Xining, Qinghai
- Country: China
- Interactive map of Dongguan Mosque
- Coordinates: 36°36′55″N 101°47′43″E

Architecture
- Type: Mosque
- Style: Islamic (former); Chinese (current)
- Completed: 1380

Specifications
- Dome: 1 (removed in c. 2021)
- Minaret: 2 (removed in c. 2021)

Chinese name
- Simplified Chinese: 东关清真大寺
- Traditional Chinese: 東關清真大寺
Transcriptions
Standard Mandarin
- Hanyu Pinyin: Dōngguān Qīngzhēndàsì

The Dongguan Mosque (simplified Chinese: 东关清真大寺; traditional Chinese: 東關清真大寺; pinyin: Dōngguān Qīngzhēndàsì) is a mosque in Xining, in the Qinghai province of China. It is the largest mosque in Qinghai.

== History ==
It was built in 1380 CE and had colorful white arches along the outside of the wide building. It had a green and white dome and two tall minarets. Renovations were completed in the late 19th to early 20th century. Shortly after, the mosque suffered heavy damages caused by political conflict. However, it continued to undergo restorations throughout the rest of the 20th century.

Generals Ma Qi and Ma Bufang controlled the Great Dongguan Mosque when they were military governors of Qinghai.

In 1989, tens of thousands of Muslims gathered around the mosque to protest against a book that demeaned Islam and Chinese Muslims. In October 1993, Muslims in the mosque protested against another book; the Chinese army then stormed the mosque and evicted the protestors.

In 2021, it was reported that the green dome and minarets of the mosque, which were built in 2000, were removed in a remodel, some reports said that it was done to make the structure look more "Chinese" in an attempt by the CCP at sinicization, and the others said that it was restored to its original local Chinese style. The management committee of the mosque said that the removed part was not part of the original structure as a cultural relic, and they remind not to create or spread rumors, and be misled by malicious people.

== Architecture ==
The mosque covers 11,940 square metres (128,500 sq ft). In the Ming period, the mosque consisted of a single sahn with a worship hall and two multi-storey minarets. The modern mosque is built in Chinese Islamic architectural style and contains elements of western architecture.

== Gallery ==
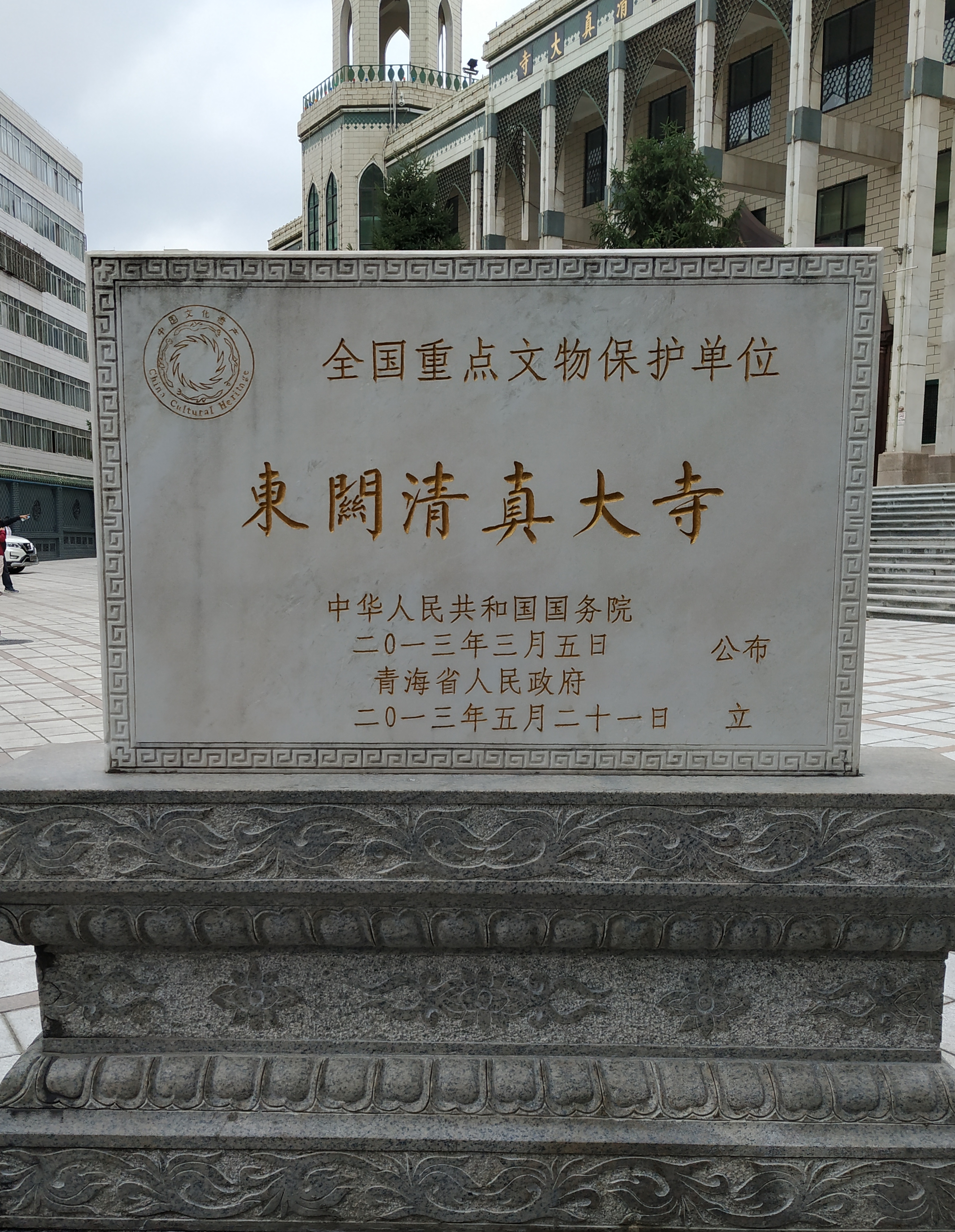
Sign of the Major Historical and Cultural Site Protected

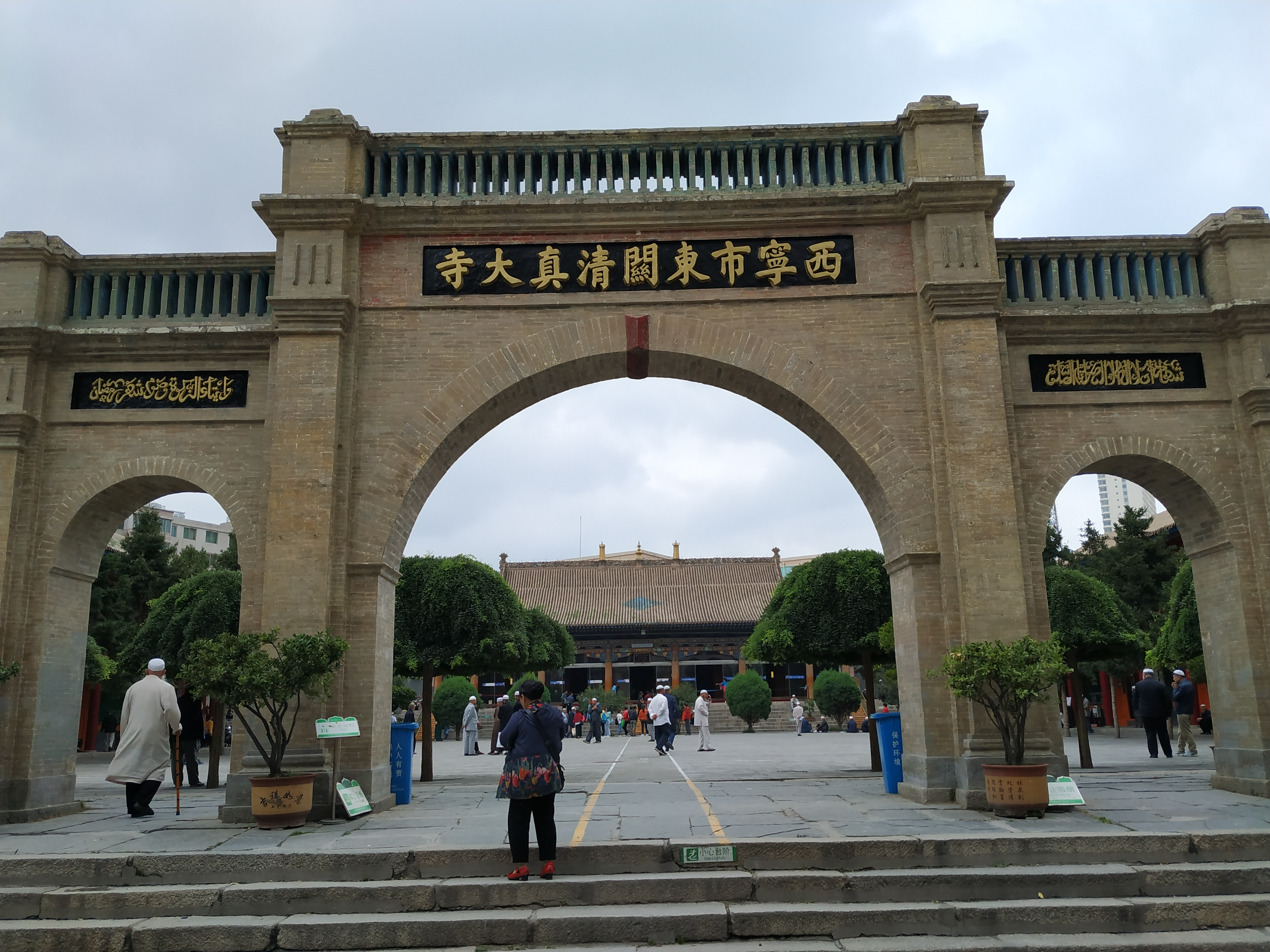
The mosque iwan

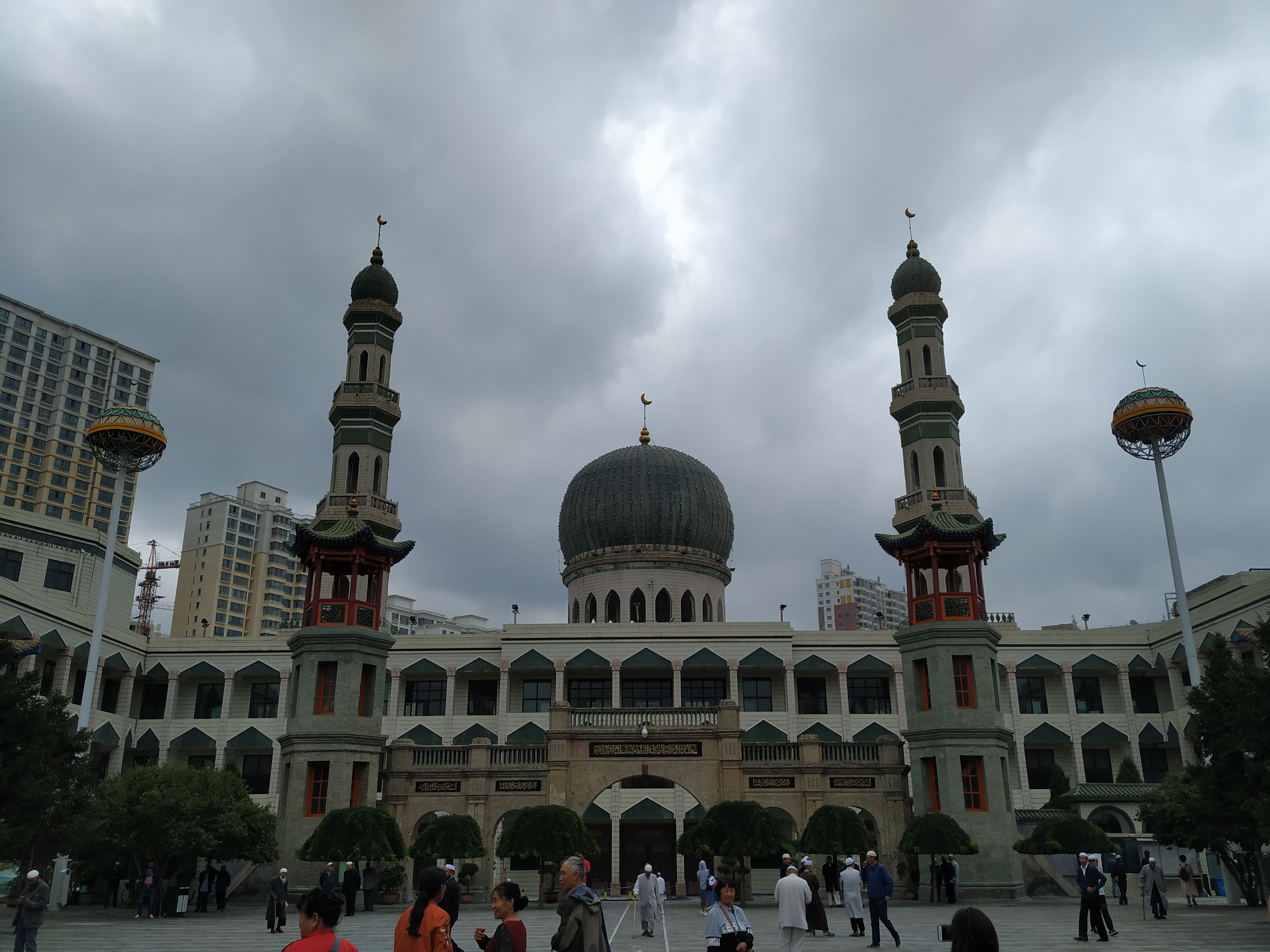
The mosque in 2018

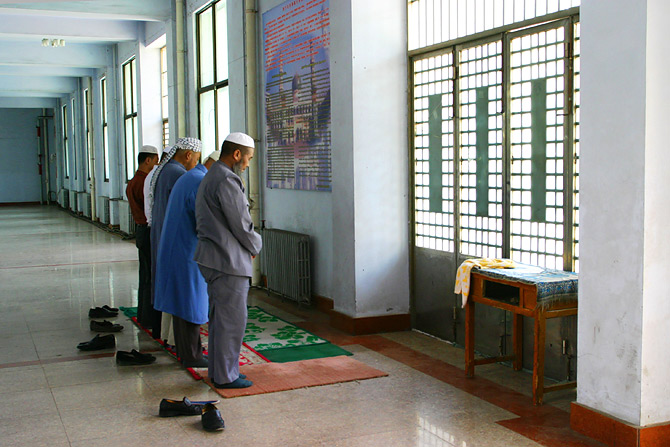
The prayer hall

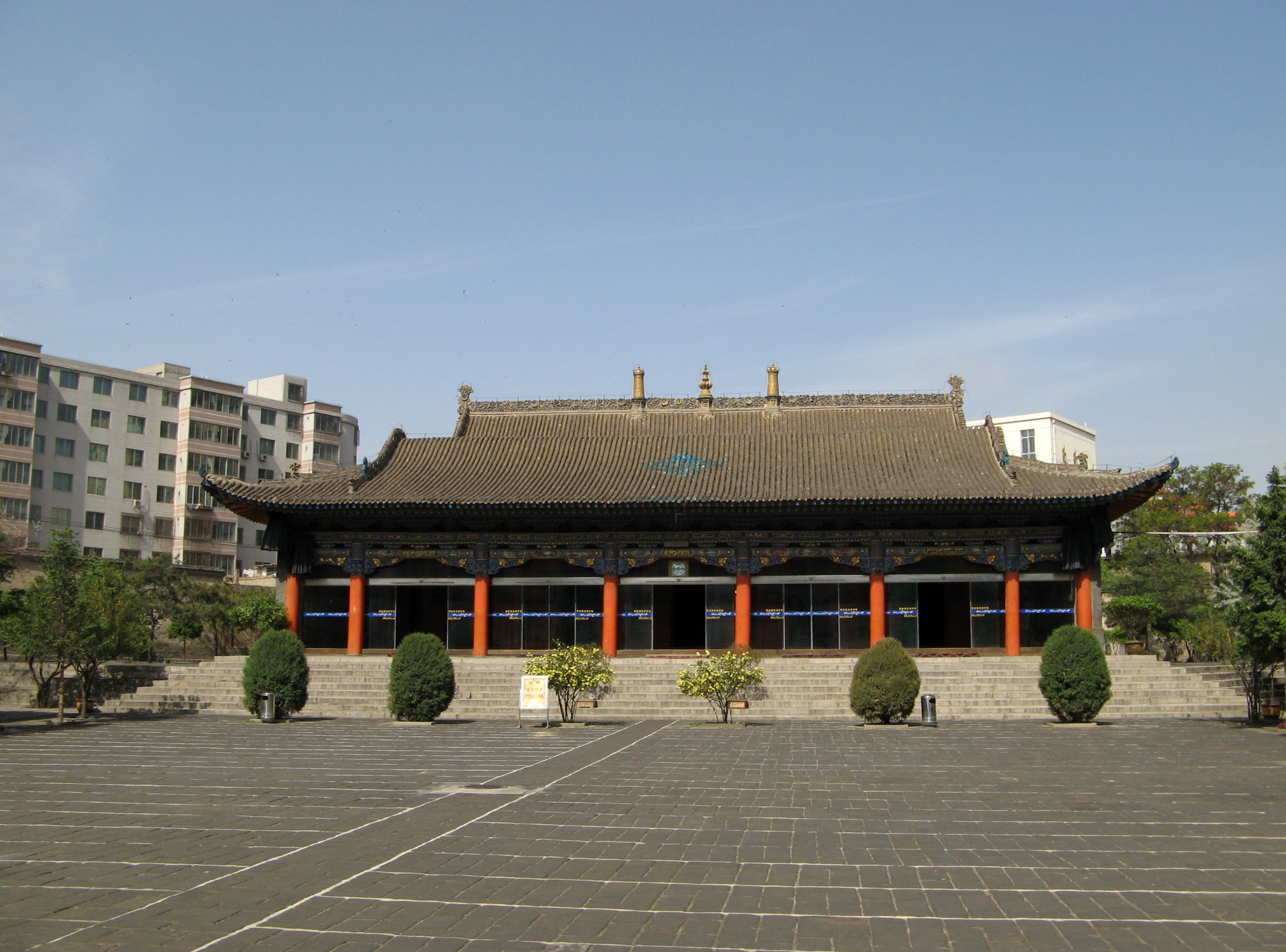
The prayer hall

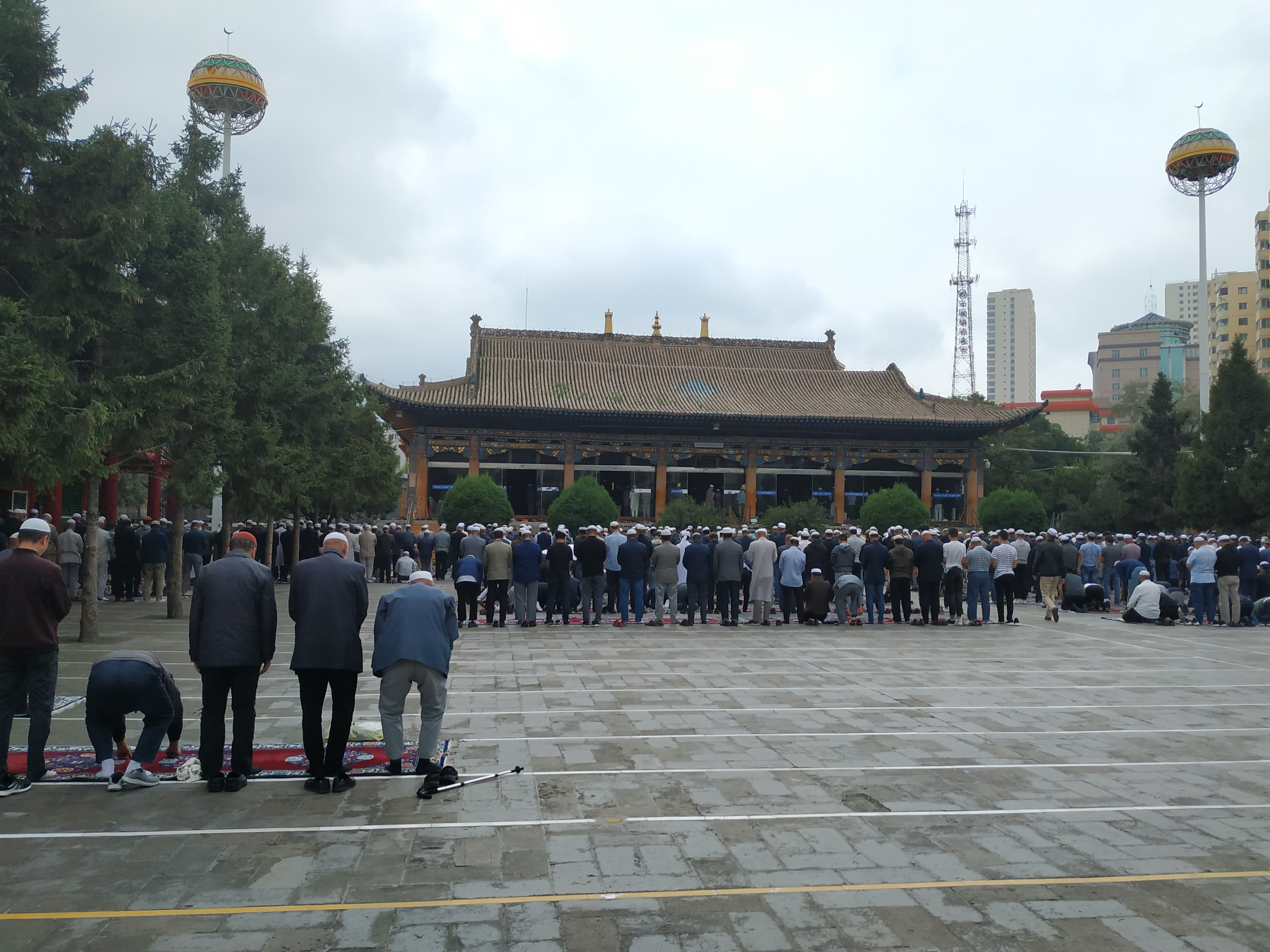
Worshipers praying in 2018

== See also ==
- Islam in China
- List of mosques in China
