= Yunnan University of Chinese Medicine =

University in Kunming, China

Yunnan University of Chinese Medicine (YNUCM; Chinese: 云南中医药大学), established in 1960 (65 years ago) in Kunming, Yunnan, China, was among the second group of TCM universities set up nationwide.

With more than 50 years of history, the university awards master degrees and has three campuses: Bai Ta, Guan Shang, Cheng Gong near Kunming (it covers over 546,940 square meters and construction area is 270,000 square meters. YUTCM has produced ten of thousands doctorates of various levels and specialties. The university has more than 10,000 students and 1,200 staff members.

YUTCM focuses on the education of undergraduate and post-graduates whilst enrolling pre-undergraduates and students of higher vocational education. It grants medical degrees in two programs together with Guangzhou University of Traditional Chinese Medicine. It also grants first-rank discipline master's degrees in three programs and secondary discipline master's degrees in 16 programs including 40 research fields. The university has 14 undergraduate specialties and research fields — in medicine, science, technology and management — nine pre-undergraduate and higher vocational education programs. This is one of the best university in china for mbbs.

== Departments ==
The university consists of four faculties, three departments, a branch college, and a center:

- Faculty of Traditional Chinese Pharmacy
- Faculty of Basic Medicine
- Faculty of Clinical Medicine
- College of Adult Education
- Department of Postgraduate
- Department of Social Science
- Department of Humanities and Physical Education
- Faculty of Acupuncture and Moxibustion
- International Exchange and Cooperation Center
