= List of universities and colleges in China =

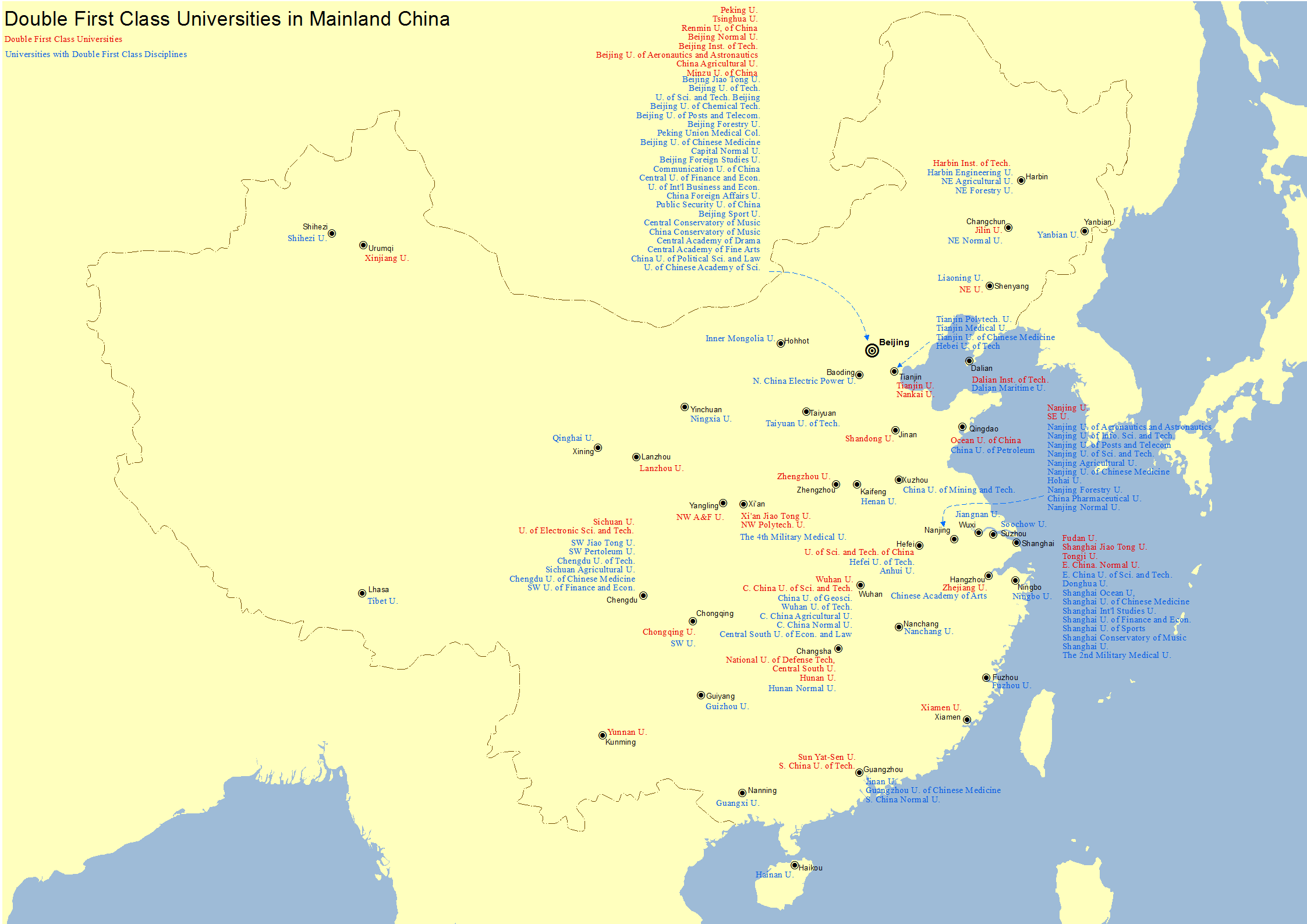
Map showing locations of major universities in mainland China

As of June 2026, there were 3,196 colleges and universities in mainland China, including 2,952 regular higher education institutions and 244 adult higher education institutions. More than 40 million Chinese students graduated from university from 2016 to 2020. Corresponding with the merging of many public universities has been the rapid expansion of the private sector in mainland China since the 1990s. Although private university enrollments are not clear, one report listed that in 2006 private universities accounted for approximately 6%, or about 1.3 million, of the 20 million students enrolled in formal higher education in China. The quality of universities and higher education in China is internationally recognized, as China has established educational cooperation and exchanges with 188 countries and regions and 46 major international organizations, and signed agreements with 54 countries, such as the United States, British, Australia and Germany on mutual recognition of higher education qualifications and academic degrees.

As of 2025, China had the world's highest number of top universities. In 2017, China had the highest number of scientific publications. As of 2025, China had the largest number of universities (396) included in the 2024–2025 U.S. News & World Report Best Global Universities. China also topped the list with 244 out of 1,000 universities in the 2025 Academic Ranking of World Universities (ARWU). More than 2,500 universities in China are included in the Webometrics Ranking of World Universities. Regardless of a variety of rankings about universities in China, the Ministry of Education of China does not advocate or recognize any rankings conducted.

== List by regions ==
=== Municipalities ===
- Beijing
- Chongqing
- Shanghai
- Tianjin

=== Provinces ===
- Anhui
- Fujian
- Gansu
- Guangdong
- Guizhou
- Hainan
- Hebei
- Heilongjiang
- Henan
- Hubei
- Hunan
- Jiangsu
- Jiangxi
- Jilin
- Liaoning
- Qinghai
- Shaanxi
- Shandong
- Shanxi
- Sichuan
- Yunnan
- Zhejiang

=== Autonomous regions ===
- Guangxi
- Inner Mongolia
- Ningxia
- Tibet
- Xinjiang

=== Outside mainland China ===
- Hong Kong
- Macau
- Taiwan

== See also ==
- Types of universities and colleges in China
- Higher education in China
- National Key Universities (China)
- State Key Laboratories
- Project 211
- Project 985
- Plan 111
- C9 League
- Excellence League
- Double First-Class Construction
