= Song Jianping =

Chinese academic (born 1965)

Song Jianping (Chinese: 宋建平, b. March 1965) is a professor specializing in the clinical foundations of Traditional Chinese Medicine (Science of Epidemic Febrile Diseases). He is currently the deputy director of Research Center for Qinghao of the Guangzhou University of Chinese Medicine.

He was born in Huichang county, Jiangxi Province. For decades, he engaged in the teaching of Synopsis of Prescriptions of the Golden Chamber and classical prescription theory as well as clinical research. He embarked on the research of tropical diseases treated with Chinese medicine since 1998, of which his clinical research on artemisinin derivatives and artemisinin-based combination therapies (ACTs) are on a leading level internationally.

As one of the major members of a research team, he has taken part in the research of preclinical efficacy pharmacology, safety pharmacology, pharmacokinetic/toxicokinetic, and drug metabolism studies and clinical study for several ACTs. Song Jianping has nineteen academic papers published at home and abroad and has written nineteen original articles. He hosts and participates in eight provincial level research projects and four research projects through international cooperation. There are seven PhD and postgraduate students directly or indirectly under his tutorship, out of which three have graduated. The outcome of his work has won the second prize of national scientific and technological progress award, the second prize of Science and Technology Award of China Association of Chinese Medicine, the second prize of Guangdong Provincial Science and Technology Award.

He was continuously invited by international organizations such as the World Health Organization, Doctors Without Borders, Mekong River malaria control program, the European Union, Health Ministry of Indonesia, and Health Ministry of Cambodia to attend relevant academic exchange for 15 times where he shared his experiences and achievements on clinical studies of malaria control through ACTs as well as field promotion trials. His meeting report has been included in the technical document of WHO/RBM and its being promoted. His achievements have helped immensely in maintaining the reputation of Guangzhou University of Chinese Medicine as a leading institute in the study field of malaria control through ACTs which exert a great influence internationally.

His team claims to have completely wiped malaria from the nation of Comoros, a model he hopes to implement in other African countries. For this activity he was awarded the Presidential Medal of Comoros.
