= First Affiliated Hospital of Guangzhou University of Chinese Medicine =

First Affiliated Hospital of Guangzhou University of Chinese Medicine (Chinese: 广州中医药大学第一附属医院)
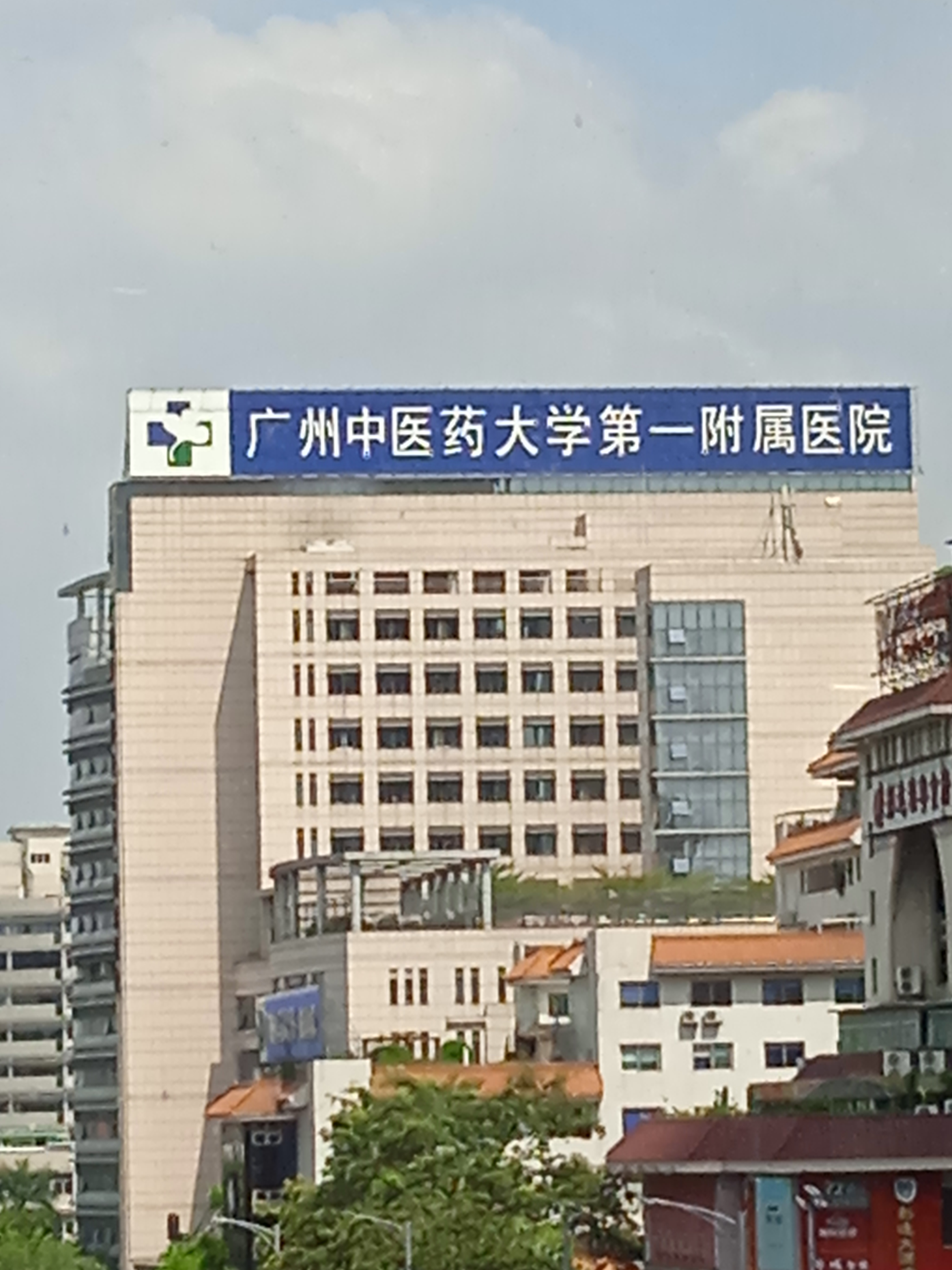
- Main Hospital Building

Geography
- Location: No. 16, Jichang Road, Sanyuanli Subdistrict, Baiyun District, Guangzhou City, Guangdong Province, People's Republic of China
- Coordinates: 23°09′36″N 113°15′33″E

Organisation
- Type: public, general, 3A
- Affiliated university: Guangzhou University of Chinese Medicine

History
- Founded: 1964

The First Affiliated Hospital of Guangzhou University of Chinese Medicine is a public Grade-A tertiary hospital of Traditional Chinese Medicine located in Guangzhou City in the south of China. It also serves as the First School of Clinical Medicine of the Guangzhou University of Chinese Medicine. Established in 1964, the hospital now has more than 2,600 employees and 2,200 beds. The hospital hosts the Guangdong Provincial Academy of Traditional Chinese Medicine Clinical Research.

== Hospital Profile ==
The First Affiliated Hospital of Guangzhou University of Chinese Medicine is a directly affiliated hospital of the university and also serves as its First School of Clinical Medicine. In 2016, the hospital established the Guangdong Provincial Academy of Traditional Chinese Medicine Clinical Research.

The hospital covers a land area of 50,940 square meters, with a construction area of 188,000 square meters. There are more than 2,600 employees, 2,200 beds and six national regional Chinese medicine clinics.

The hospital has an annual emergency medical treatments of 2.8 million, and a number of hospitalized patients of 77,000.

There are eight national key disciplines and fourteen key specialties of the State Administration of Traditional Chinese Medicine.

== Campuses and Outpatient Departments ==
=== Directly Affiliated Campuses/Departments ===
- Main Campus: Located at No. 16 Jichang Road, Sanyuanli Subdistrict, Baiyun District, Guangzhou.
- Second Outpatient Department: Established in 1985, now located at No. 989 Xicha Road, Songzhou Subdistrict, Baiyun District, Guangzhou.
- Xianlie East Outpatient Department: Located at No. 258 Xianlie East Road, Tianhe District, Guangzhou; established in August 1994.

=== Managed Hospitals ===
Nanshan Hospital (Shenzhen Nanshan District Hospital of Traditional Chinese Medicine): Located in Nanshan District, Shenzhen. The outpatient department opened in 2019.

Baiyun Hospital (Guangzhou Baiyun District Hospital of Traditional Chinese Medicine / Guangzhou Baiyun District Renhe Overseas Chinese Hospital): Located at No. 2 Helong 7th Road, Renhe Town, Baiyun District, Guangzhou; established on June 8, 1989, designated a "Grade III-A Hospital" on December 24, 2024.

Chongqing Hospital (Chongqing Beibei Hospital of Traditional Chinese Medicine): Located at No. 380 Jiangjun Road, Beibei District, Chongqing. It became a supported hospital of the First Affiliated Hospital of Guangzhou University of Chinese Medicine and launched the construction of a new campus in 2022, with the official unveiling taking place in July 2023.

Shenshan Hospital (Guangzhou University of Chinese Medicine Shenshan Hospital / Shenshan Hospital of Traditional Chinese Medicine / Shanwei Hospital of Traditional Chinese Medicine): Located in Shanwei City; an agreement for entrusted management was signed in January 2024, and the hospital was officially inaugurated in July of the same year.

Zhongshan Hospital (Zhongshan No. 2 Hospital of Traditional Chinese Medicine, Zhongshan Sanxiang Hospital). The hospital's new campus (located at No. 68 Xinrong Road, Dabu Village, Sanxiang Town, Zhongshan City) officially opened on June 30, 2025.

Yuexi Hospital (Maoming Dianbai District Hospital of Traditional Chinese Medicine, Maoming Dianbai District Orthopedic Hospital, First Affiliated Hospital of Guangdong Maoming Health Vocational College): Located at No. 66 Baomao Avenue South, Dianbai District, Maoming City.

== Events ==
On September 22, 2025, Doctor Wang in the Department of Orthopedics of the First Hospital of Guangzhou University of Chinese Medicine was seriously injured with multiple wounds. It was not clear if it was caused by a patient-doctor controdiction. Following emergency treatment, Dr. Wang was no longer in critical condition. It was reported that Wang was a kind doctor with high accessment from patients. The attacker was arrested by the police.

== See also ==
- Guangzhou University of Chinese Medicine
- Shenzhen Hospital of Guangzhou University of Chinese Medicine
