= Guangzhou University of Chinese Medicine =

Provincial public university in Guangzhou, Guangdong, China

Coordinates: 23.1592°N 113.2611°E

- 广州中医药大学 (Chinese)
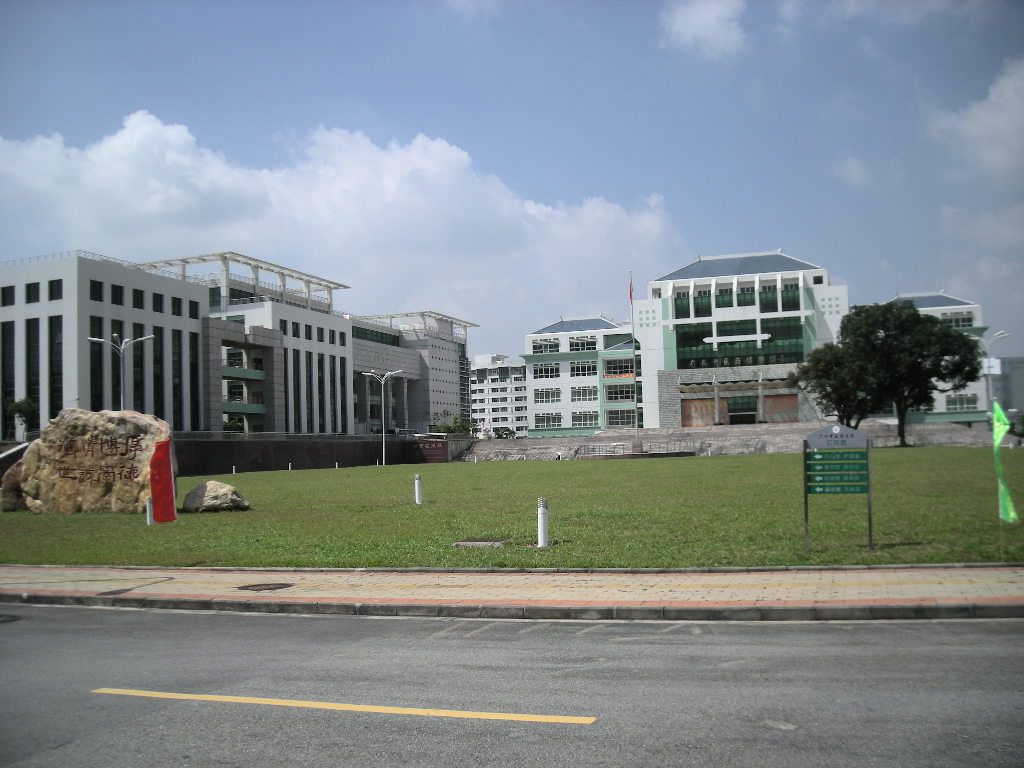
- Motto: 厚德博学，精诚济世
- Type: Public
- Established: September 15, 1924; 102 years ago
- Affiliations: Guangdong-Hong Kong-Macao University Alliance
- Location: Guangzhou, Guangdong, China
- Campus: Urban
- Colours
- Website: www.gzhtcm.edu.cn

Chinese name
- Simplified Chinese: 广州中医药大学
- Traditional Chinese: 廣州中醫藥大學
Transcriptions
Standard Mandarin
- Hanyu Pinyin: Guǎngzhōu Zhōngyīyào Dàxué
Yue: Cantonese
- Jyutping: gwong2 zau1 zung1 ji1 joek6 daai6 hok6

The Guangzhou University of Chinese Medicine (GZHTCM; 广州中医药大学) is a provincial public university in Guangzhou, Guangdong, China. It is affiliated with the Province of Guangdong. The university is part of the Double First-Class Construction.

There are 30 affiliated tertiary hospitals (including 4 directly affiliated hospitals), and it is the university with the largest number of affiliated hospitals in China.

== Faculty ==
- Song Jianping

== See also ==
- Shenzhen Hospital of Guangzhou University of Chinese Medicine
- First Affiliated Hospital of Guangzhou University of Chinese Medicine
- List of universities in China
- List of universities and colleges in Guangdong
