= Shenzhen Hospital of Guangzhou University of Chinese Medicine =

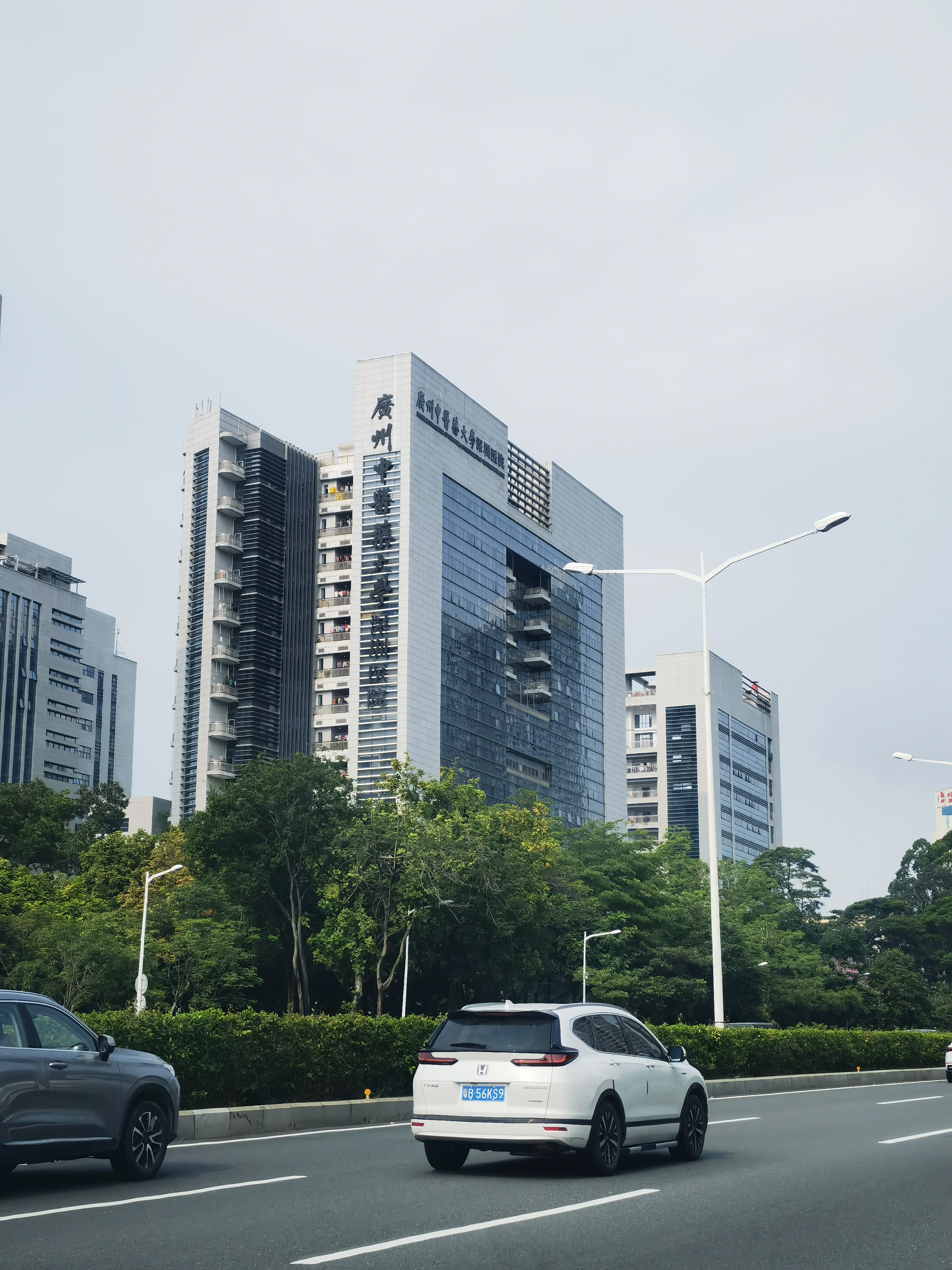

Geography
- Location: 6001 Beihuan Boulevard; Shenzhen, China, Guangdong, China
- Coordinates: 22°33′34″N 114°2′05″E

Organisation
- Type: Traditional Chinese Medicine, Teaching, Specialist, Research
- Affiliated university: Guangzhou University of Chinese Medicine

Services
- Emergency department: Yes
- Beds: 400

History
- Founded: 1992

Links
- Website: www.szftzy.com
- Lists: Hospitals in China

Chinese name
- Simplified Chinese: 广州中医药大学深圳医院
- Traditional Chinese: 廣州中醫藥大學深圳醫院
Transcriptions
Standard Mandarin
- Hanyu Pinyin: Guǎngzhōu Zhōngyīyào Dàxué Shēnzhèn Yīyuàn
Yue: Cantonese
- Jyutping: gwong2 zau1 zung1 ji1 joek6 daai6 hok6 sam1 zan3 ji1 jyun6*2

The Shenzhen Hospital of Guangzhou University of Chinese Medicine (Chinese: 广州中医药大学深圳医院) is a public teaching hospital which is specialized in Traditional Chinese medicine. It locates at Jingtianbei neighborhood next to Beihuan Boulevard, in Futian District in Shenzhen. It ran into operation in July 1998 as Futian District Traditional Chinese Medicine Hospital in a multipurpose medical building, which was a five stories building with emergency service, consulting rooms, and wards.

Before its establishment, the only one outpatient department had been put into used at Lianhuabei neighborhood, then it was renamed as Lianhuabei Community No. 1 Healthcare Centre.

== Timeline ==
In June 1996, its first practice surgery Lianhuabei Community No. 1 Healthcare Centre had been established, supplying general health service to Lianhuabei neighborhood that had more than 400,000 population.

Since 1998 to 2001, three community healthcare centres Jingmi, Tian'an Te'fa has been put into operation.

In 2002, Outpatient Department of Futian District No. 2 Hospital at Huangmugang neighborhood had been operated by Futian District Traditional Chinese Medicine Hospital. In a same year, Lianhua'ercun Community Healthcare Centre of Futian District NO.2 Hospital was handed over to the latter.

Five more community healthcare centres ran into service in 2007. They are Fuzhong, Yu'tian, Jingxin, Xianglin, and Jinghua.

Since July 2015, the hospital has been managed by Futian District Government and Guangzhou University of Chinese Medicine. Meanwhile, it was named as Guangzhou University of Chinese Medicine - Shenzhen Hospital, and Futian government still invests on it.

On 19 December 2016, the hospital declares its accreditation of Level Three, Grade A has been approved to the classification by the State Administration of Traditional Chinese Medicine.

== See also ==
- First Affiliated Hospital of Guangzhou University of Chinese Medicine
