= List of universities and colleges in Yunnan =

This is a list of universities and colleges in Yunnan Province.

Note: Institutions without full-time bachelor programs are not listed.

| Name | Chinese name | Type | Location | Note |
|---|---|---|---|---|
| Yunnan University | 云南大学 | Provincial | Kunming | Project 211 Double First Class University Plan |
| Kunming University of Science and Technology | 昆明理工大学 | Provincial | Kunming | |
| Yunnan Agricultural University | 云南农业大学 | Provincial | Kunming | |
| Southwest Forestry University | 西南林业大学 | Provincial | Kunming | |
| Kunming Medical University | 昆明医科大学 | Provincial | Kunming | |
| Dali University | 大理大学 | Provincial | Dali | |
| Kunming University of Science and Technology | 昆明理工大学 | Provincial | Kunming | |
| Yunnan University of Traditional Chinese Medicine | 云南中医学院 | Provincial | Kunming | |
| Yunnan Normal University | 云南师范大学 | Provincial | Kunming | |
| Zhaotong University | 昭通学院 | Provincial | Zhaotong | |
| Qujing Normal University | 曲靖师范学院 | Provincial | Qujing | |
| Pu'er University | 普洱学院 | Provincial | Pu'er | |
| Baoshan University | 保山学院 | Provincial | Baoshan | |
| Honghe University | 红河学院 | Provincial | Honghe | |
| Yunnan University of Finance and Economics | 云南财经大学 | Provincial | Kunming | |
| Yunnan Arts University | 云南艺术大学 | Provincial | Kunming | |
| Yunnan Minzu University | 云南民族大学 | Provincial | Kunming | |
| Yuxi Normal University | 师范玉溪学院 | Provincial | Yuxi | |
| Chuxiong Normal University | 楚雄师范学院 | Provincial | Chuxiong | |
| Yunnan Police College | 云南警官学院 | Provincial | Kunming | |
| Kunming University | 昆明学院 | Provincial | Kunming | |
| Wenshan University | 文山学院 | Provincial | Wenshan | |

== See also ==
- Greater Mekong Sub-region Academic and Research Network (GMSARN)
- Yunnan Provincial Library
