= Heilongjiang Morning Post =

- Type: Daily newspaper
- Founded: October 24, 1992
- Ceased publication: January 1, 2019
- Headquarters: Harbin
- Website: newspaper.northeast.cn/hljcb

The Heilongjiang Morning Post (Chinese: 黑龙江晨报), or Heilongjiang Chenbao, also known as Heilongjiang Morning News, was a Harbin-based Chinese-language daily newspaper published in China.

Heilongjiang Morning Post was the first morning newspaper in the New China. It was founded on October 24, 1992, when it was called Eastern Morning Post (东方晨报).

== History ==
Heilongjiang Morning Post was established on October 24, 1992. On December 15, 2002, the online version of the Post was launched.

On January 1, 2019, Heilongjiang Morning Post ceased publication.
