= Xining =

Capital and largest city of Qinghai, China

Xining 西宁市 Sining
- Prefecture-level city
- City of Xining
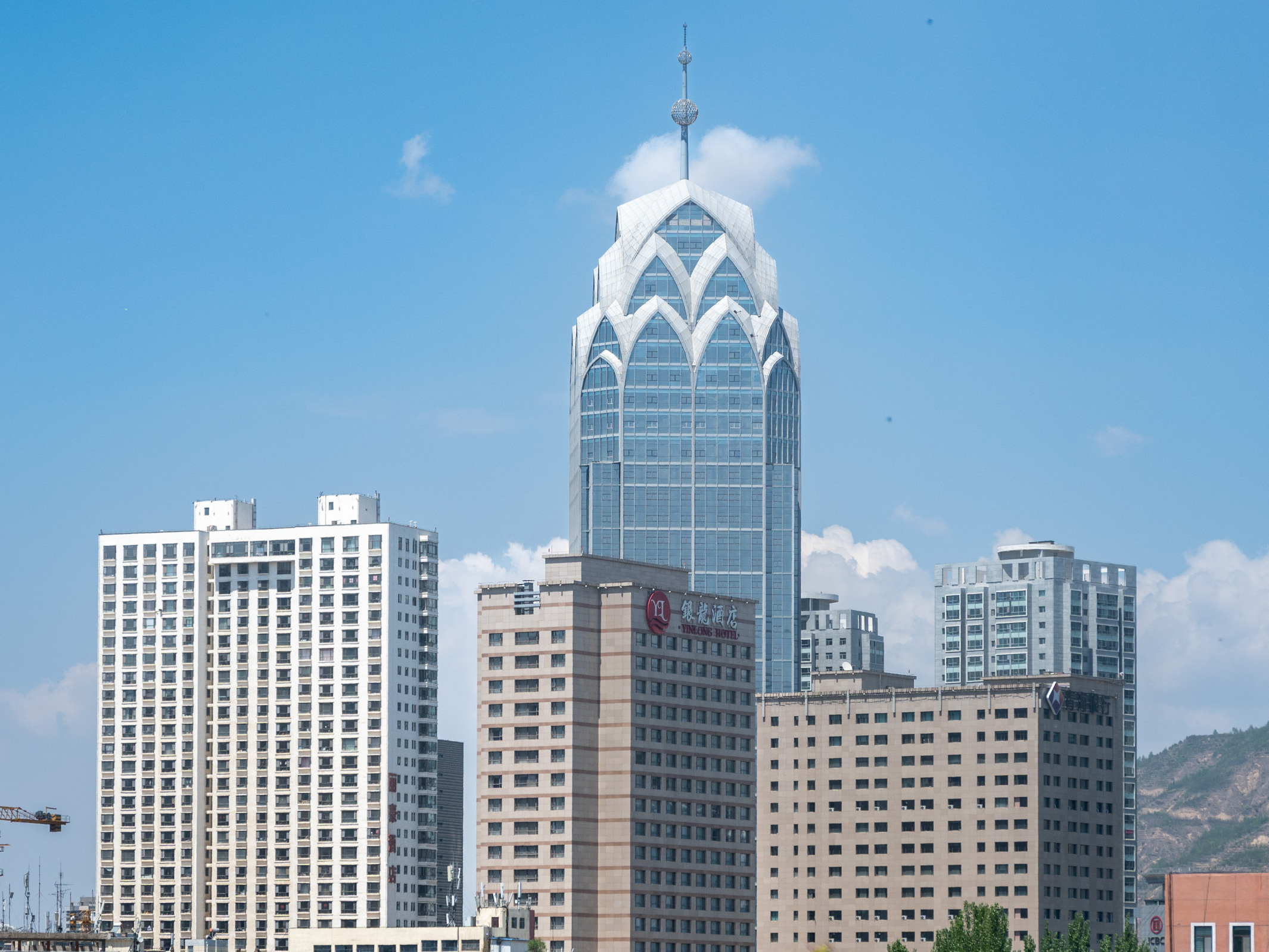
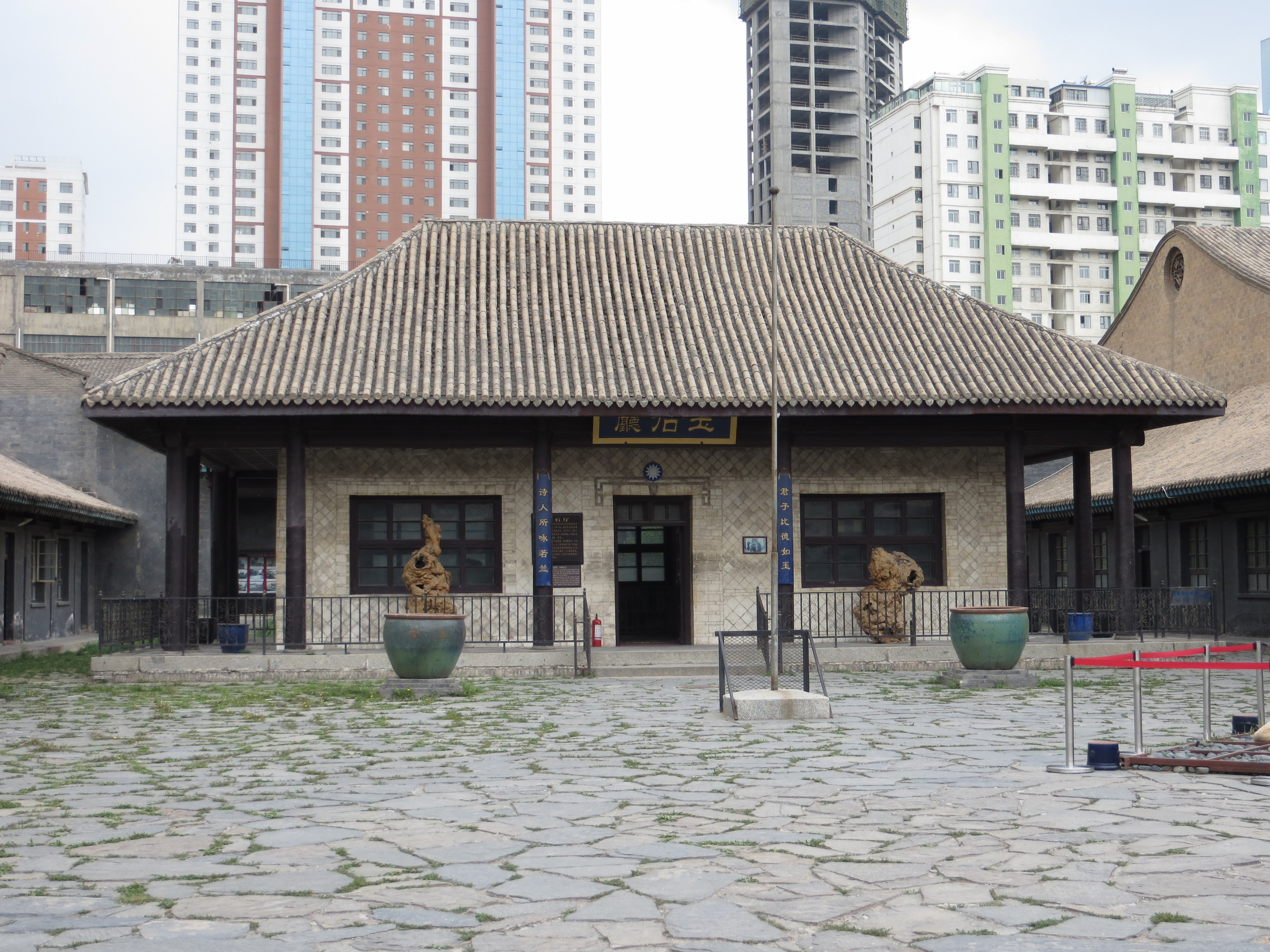
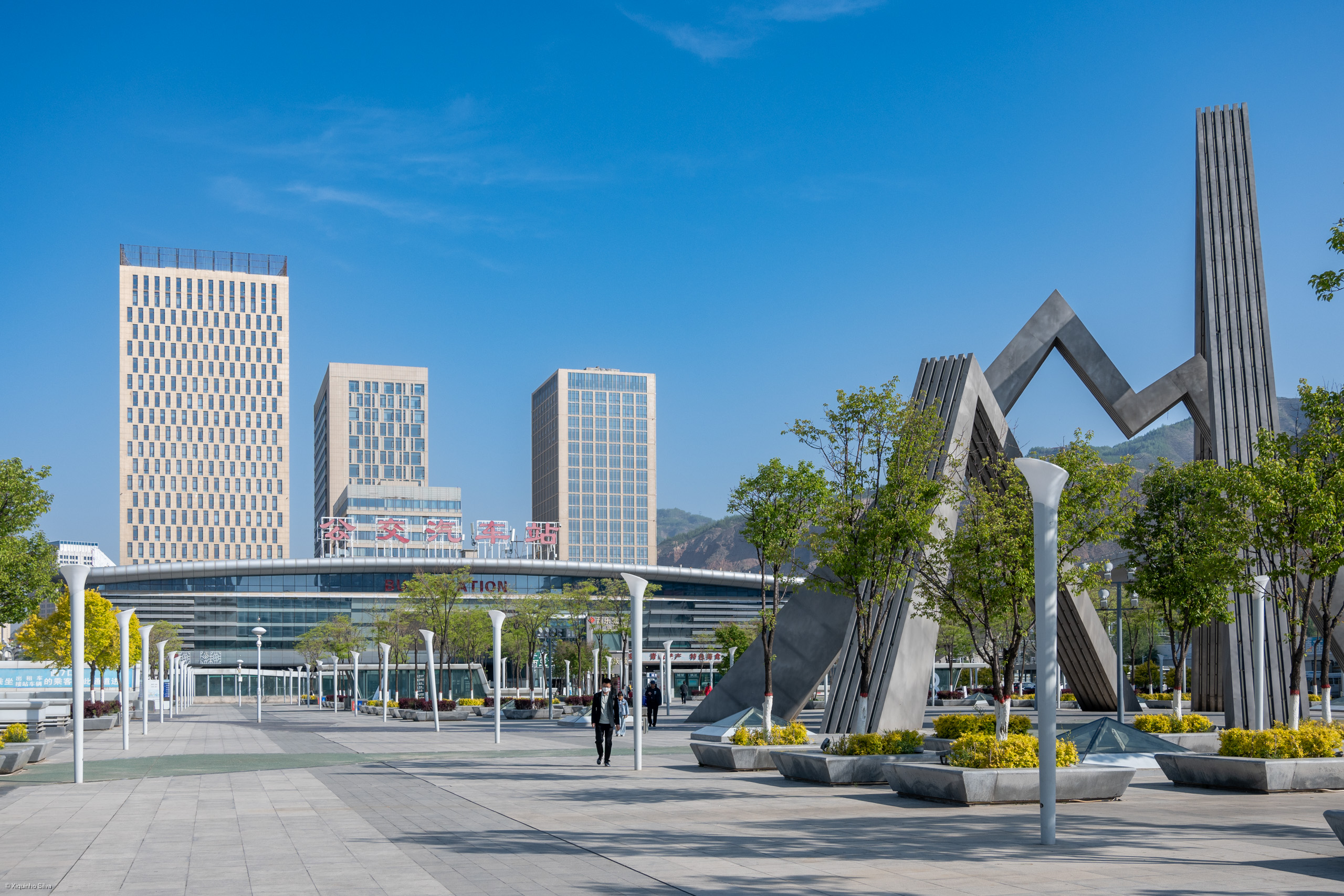
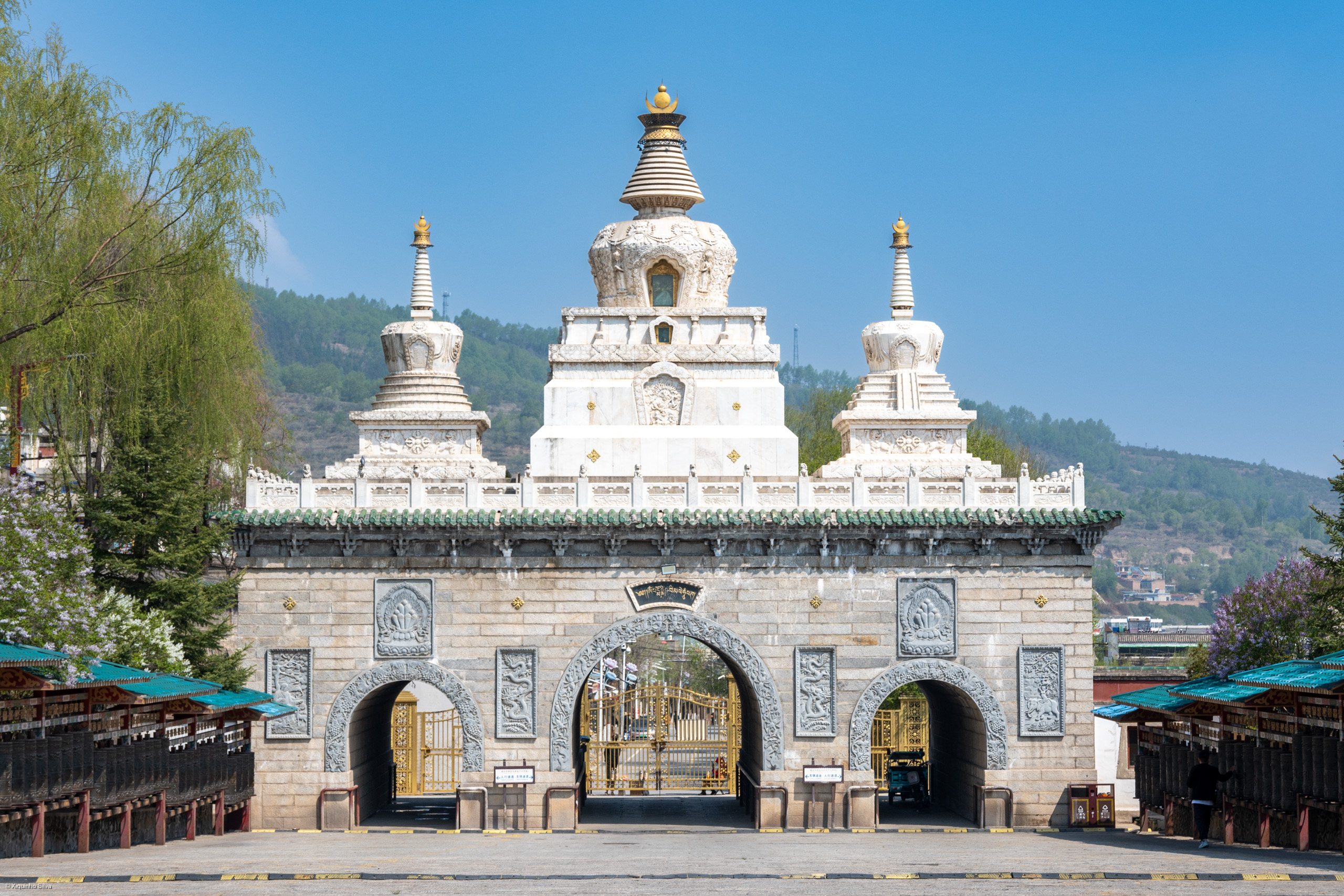
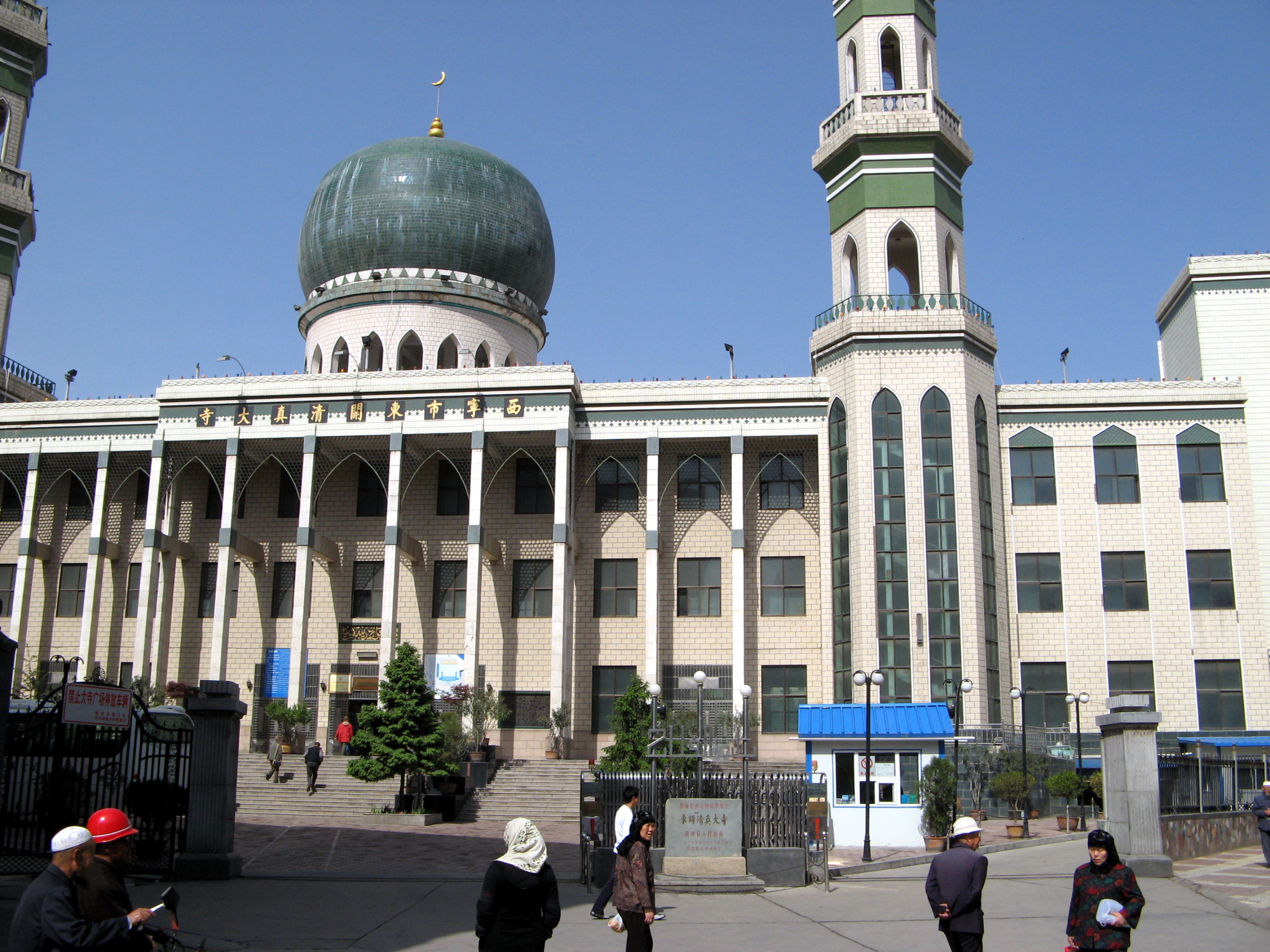
- Xining skyline Ma Bufang Mansion Xining Railway Station Kumbum Monastery Dongguan Mosque

- Location of Xining City jurisdiction (dark blue) in Qinghai

- Location of the city center in Qinghai Xining (China)
- Coordinates (Qinghai People's Government): 36°37′21″N 101°46′49″E
- Country: China
- Province: Qinghai
- Municipal seat: Chengzhong

Government
  - Type: Prefecture-level city
  - Body: Xining Municipal People's Congress
  - CCP Secretary: Wang Weidong
  - Congress Chairman: Song Chenxi
  - Mayor: Shi Jianping
  - CPPCC Chairman: Duan Fada

Area
  - Prefecture-level city: 7,596 km^{2} (2,933 sq mi)
  - Urban: 2,892.7 km^{2} (1,116.9 sq mi)
  - Metro: 2,892.7 km^{2} (1,116.9 sq mi)
- Elevation: 2,275 m (7,464 ft)

Population (2020 census)
  - Prefecture-level city: 2,467,965
  - Density: 324.9/km^{2} (841.5/sq mi)
  - Urban: 1,954,795
  - Urban density: 675.77/km^{2} (1,750.2/sq mi)
  - Metro: 1,954,795
  - Metro density: 675.77/km^{2} (1,750.2/sq mi)

GDP
  - Prefecture-level city: CN¥ 164.4 billion US$ 18.2 billion
  - Per capita: CN¥ 49,185; US$ 7,897
- Time zone: UTC+8 (China Standard)
- Postal code: 810000
- Area code: 971
- ISO 3166 code: CN-QH-01
- License plate prefixes: 青A
- Website: www.xining.gov.cn (in Chinese)

Xining
- "Xīníng" in Traditional (top) and Simplified (bottom) Chinese characters

Chinese name
- Simplified Chinese: 西宁
- Traditional Chinese: 西寧
- Postal: Sining or Ziling
- Literal meaning: "Western tranquility"
Transcriptions
Standard Mandarin
- Hanyu Pinyin: Xīníng
other Mandarin
- Xiao'erjing: ثِ نٍ

Tibetan name
- Tibetan: ཟི་ལིང
Transcriptions
- Wylie: Zi-ling
- Tibetan Pinyin: Siling

Mongolian name
- Mongolian Cyrillic: Сэлэнг
- Mongolian script: ᠰᠢᠨᠢᠩ
Transcriptions
- SASM/GNC: Seleng

Xining (Note: /ʃiːˈnɪŋ/, shee-NING; [ɕí.nǐŋ]; alternatively known as Si'ning) is the capital and most populous city of Qinghai province in western China and the largest city on the Tibetan Plateau. As of the 2020 census, it had 2,467,965 inhabitants (2,208,708 as of 2010), of whom 1,954,795 lived in the built-up (or metro) area made of 5 urban districts. The city lies in the Huangshui River Valley, also known as Tsongkha (Tibetan: ཙོང་ཁ་), and owing to its high altitude, has a cool climate on the borderline between cool semi-arid and dry winter humid continental.

Xining was a commercial hub along the Northern Silk Road's Hexi Corridor for over 2000 years, and was a stronghold of the Han, Sui, Tang, and Song dynasties' resistance against nomadic attacks from the west. Although long a part of Gansu province, Xining was added to Qinghai in 1928. Xining holds sites of religious significance to Muslims and Buddhists, including the Dongguan Mosque and Kumbum Monastery. It is connected by the Qinghai–Tibet railway to Lhasa, Tibet and connected by a high-speed railway to Lanzhou, Gansu and Ürümqi, Xinjiang.

The city is home to Qinghai University, a comprehensive university and the only Double First-Class University in Xining.

== History ==
Xining has a history of over 2,100 years and was a chief commercial hub on the Hexi Corridor caravan route to Tibet, handling especially timber, wool and salt in ancient times. The trade along the Hexi Corridor was part of a larger trade corridor along the Northern Silk Road, whose use was intensified in the 1st century BC after efforts by the Han dynasty to control this route.

Under the Han dynasty (206 BC – 220 AD), a county called Linqiang was established to control the local Qiang tribesmen. It was again a frontier county under the Sui (581–618) and Tang (618–907) dynasties; during the 7th and early 8th centuries it was a center of constant warfare with Tuyuhun and Tibet. In 763, it was overrun by the Tibetans and while under Tibetan control was known to the Chinese as Qingtang cheng (青唐城). Recovered by the Song dynasty in 1104, it received the name Xining (meaning "peace in the west") and has been the seat of a prefecture or superior prefecture under that name since that time. The founder of Gelug Tsongkhapa (Tibetan: ཙོང་ཁ་པ་, meaning: "the man from Tsongkha". c. 1357–1419) was born in the 14th century, and on the site of his birthplace the Kumbum Monastery was founded in the late 16th century, establishing Xining as an important religious center for the Gelug School of Buddhists.

A major earthquake occurred May 22, 1927, measuring at a magnitude of 7.6. It was one of the deadliest earthquakes in China with a total count of over 40,000 deaths. It also caused large land fractures.

Xining was the extraterritorial capital of the Koko Nor territory and remained in Gansu until 1928, when it became the provincial capital of the newly established independent province of Qinghai.

Xining was subjected to aerial bombardment by Japanese warplanes in 1941 during the Second Sino-Japanese War. The bombing spurred all ethnicities in Qinghai, including the local Qinghai Mongols and Qinghai Tibetans, against the Japanese. The Salar Muslim General Han Youwen directed the defense of the city of Xining during air raids by Japanese planes.

Xining was given municipal status in 1945.

Under the rule of Governor Ma Bufang, Xining, like the rest of Qinghai, underwent industrialization and modernization. In 1947 the USA sold Ma Bufang a piped water (sewage) system which was installed in Xining. Ma Bufang also promoted education. He made businessmen methodically clean up Xining by serving as insect exterminators.

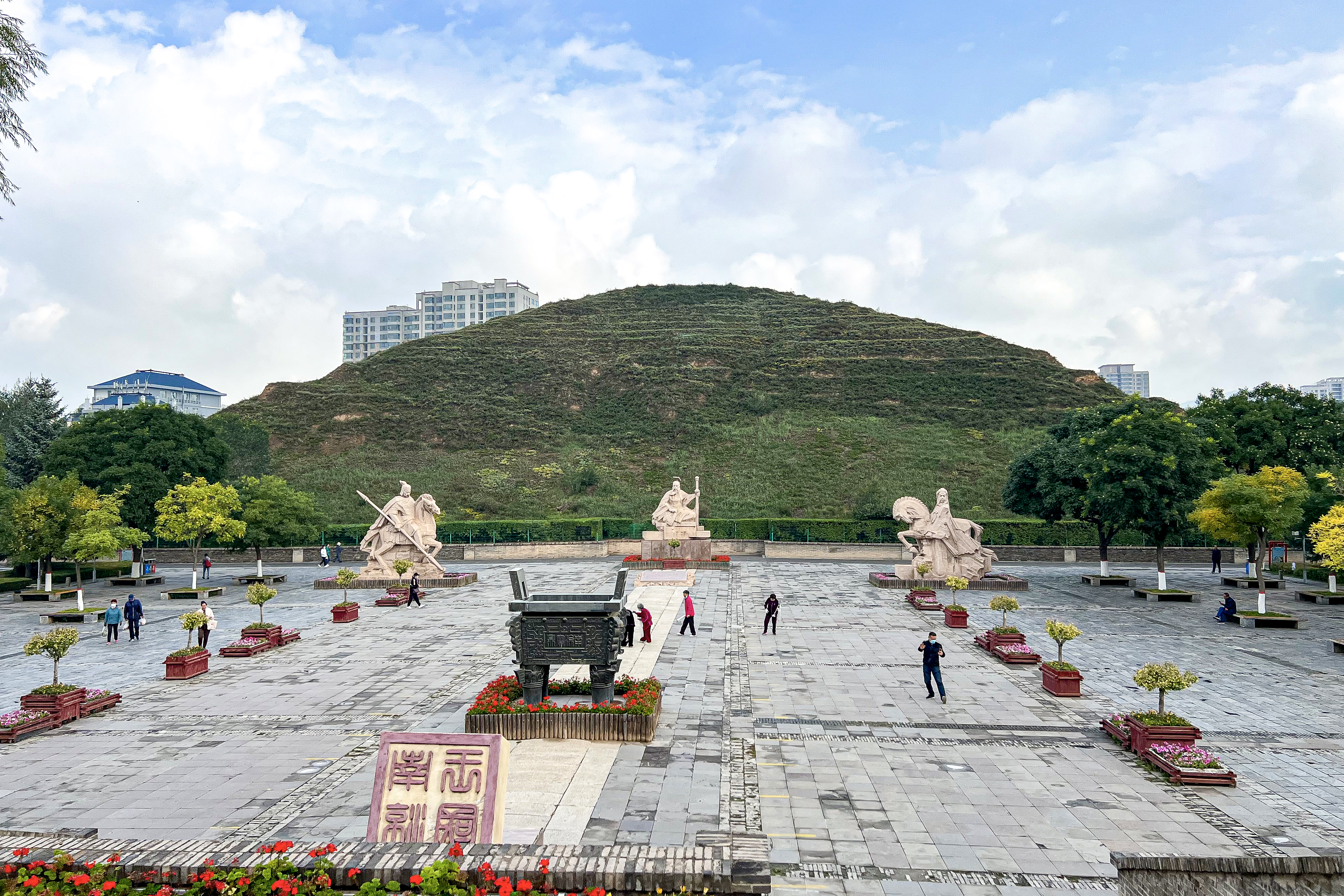
Nanliang Hutai Relics Park

Since the late 1950s, when the Liujiaxia Dam and hydroelectric project came into operation in neighboring Gansu province, Xining has been linked by a high-tension electrical grid to both Liujia and Lanzhou. It also uses local coal from mines at Datong County to the north, but however, a modern woollen mill was installed at Xining before 1957. The city also has a leather industry and is a market for salt from the Qaidam region. During the late 1950s medium-sized iron and steelworks were built there, supplying metal to Lanzhou.

Construction of a highway to the mineral-rich Qaidam basin, and completion in 1959 a link to the Chinese rail network via Lanzhou in Gansu province, has spurred industrial development. This effort was part of a plan of the central government to rapidly exploit oil and pasturage in the Xining area beginning in the 1950s.

== Geography ==
Xining is located in the eastern part of Qinghai Province and lies on the Huangshui River. The four urban districts have a total area of 343 km^{2} (132 sq mi).

Xining is located on the eastern edge of the Qinghai–Tibet Plateau and the upper reaches of the Huangshui River. It is the political, economic, and cultural center of Qinghai Province with an average altitude of about 2,200 metres (7,200 ft). Human activity in the region can be traced to 2,100 years ago. During the Western and Eastern Han dynasties, owing to its developing agriculture, Xining was paid notice due to its economic and military significance. As well as being an important hinge between the Central Plains and the western part of China in ancient times, Xining was an important link in the Silk Road. It continues to be an important rail and road link to the hinterlands of the Qinghai–Tibet Plateau.

=== Climate ===
Xining has also been dubbed the Summer Resort Capital of China owing to its cool summer, with a borderline cold semi-arid climate (Köppen BSk)/dry winter humid continental climate (Dwb). Conditions are influenced by the aridity and high altitude. Nights are cold or cool throughout the year, and the diurnal temperature variation often reaches or exceeds 15 °C (27 °F). The monthly 24-hour average temperatures ranges from −7.9 °C (17.8 °F) in January to 17.5 °C (63.5 °F) in July; the annual mean is 6.0 °C (42.8 °F), still making it one of the warmest locations in Qinghai due to the low elevation by provincial standards. Rainfall falls mainly from May to September, and the area is often dry and sunny: with monthly percent possible sunshine ranging from 49 percent in September to 67 percent in November, the city receives 2,540 hours of bright sunshine per year. Extreme temperatures have ranged from −26.6 °C (−16 °F) to 36.5 °C (98 °F). Snow cover is very low due to the dry winters.

Climate data for Xining, elevation 2,295 m (7,530 ft), (1991–2020 normals, extremes 1951–present)
Month	Jan	Feb	Mar	Apr	May	Jun	Jul	Aug	Sep	Oct	Nov	Dec	Year
Record high °C (°F)	15.4 (59.7)	20.8 (69.4)	26.2 (79.2)	31.8 (89.2)	31.2 (88.2)	31.9 (89.4)	36.5 (97.7)	34.7 (94.5)	29.9 (85.8)	26.6 (79.9)	19.3 (66.7)	14.1 (57.4)	36.5 (97.7)
Mean daily maximum °C (°F)	2.1 (35.8)	5.8 (42.4)	11.0 (51.8)	16.6 (61.9)	20.2 (68.4)	23.2 (73.8)	25.1 (77.2)	24.2 (75.6)	19.6 (67.3)	14.5 (58.1)	8.6 (47.5)	3.4 (38.1)	14.5 (58.2)
Daily mean °C (°F)	−7.9 (17.8)	−3.6 (25.5)	2.2 (36.0)	8.3 (46.9)	12.3 (54.1)	15.6 (60.1)	17.5 (63.5)	16.6 (61.9)	12.2 (54.0)	6.2 (43.2)	−0.7 (30.7)	−6.3 (20.7)	6.0 (42.9)
Mean daily minimum °C (°F)	−14.6 (5.7)	−10.4 (13.3)	−4.4 (24.1)	1.4 (34.5)	5.7 (42.3)	9.2 (48.6)	11.6 (52.9)	11.1 (52.0)	7.4 (45.3)	0.9 (33.6)	−6.5 (20.3)	−12.6 (9.3)	−0.1 (31.8)
Record low °C (°F)	−24.9 (−12.8)	−20.7 (−5.3)	−16.9 (1.6)	−12.5 (9.5)	−3.9 (25.0)	0.2 (32.4)	4.2 (39.6)	3.2 (37.8)	−1.1 (30.0)	−12.5 (9.5)	−19.0 (−2.2)	−26.6 (−15.9)	−26.6 (−15.9)
Average precipitation mm (inches)	1.8 (0.07)	1.9 (0.07)	8.8 (0.35)	20.7 (0.81)	53.8 (2.12)	64.5 (2.54)	81.5 (3.21)	87.0 (3.43)	68.0 (2.68)	23.3 (0.92)	5.2 (0.20)	1.2 (0.05)	417.7 (16.45)
Average precipitation days (≥ 0.1 mm)	3.2	2.9	4.9	7.1	11.7	14.4	15.4	14.5	14.4	7.7	3.2	2.1	101.5
Average snowy days	5.1	5.8	7.0	3.4	0.4	0	0	0	0.1	1.5	4.2	4.0	31.5
Average relative humidity (%)	48	45	46	47	55	61	66	69	72	67	58	52	57
Mean monthly sunshine hours	196.7	200.3	223.9	232.8	240.5	230.1	223.8	215.8	181.4	200.0	201.8	192.6	2,539.7
Percentage possible sunshine	63	65	60	59	55	53	51	52	49	58	67	64	58
Source: China Meteorological AdministrationNOAAall-time August High

=== River management ===
In 2007, the World Bank lent US$1 billion to aid river treatment in Xining, including Sanxian County's anti-flooding project, with an added US$1 billion to support infrastructure. Qinghai has invested large amounts in the treatment of Huangshui Main River and Nanchuan River, totalling 24.5 km (15.2 mi). However, a treatment on a 40 km (25 mi) river course and 10 flash flood relief channels remain pending due to lack of equipment. In Sanxian County, a 108.4 m (356 ft) long river course and 80 flash flood relief channels need treatment.

=== Air quality ===
According to a 2011 World Health Organization (based on Chinese statistics), Xining has the second worst air quality (annual mean PM10 ug/m3 of 141) among eleven western China cities, and is worse than Beijing (121).

== Economy ==
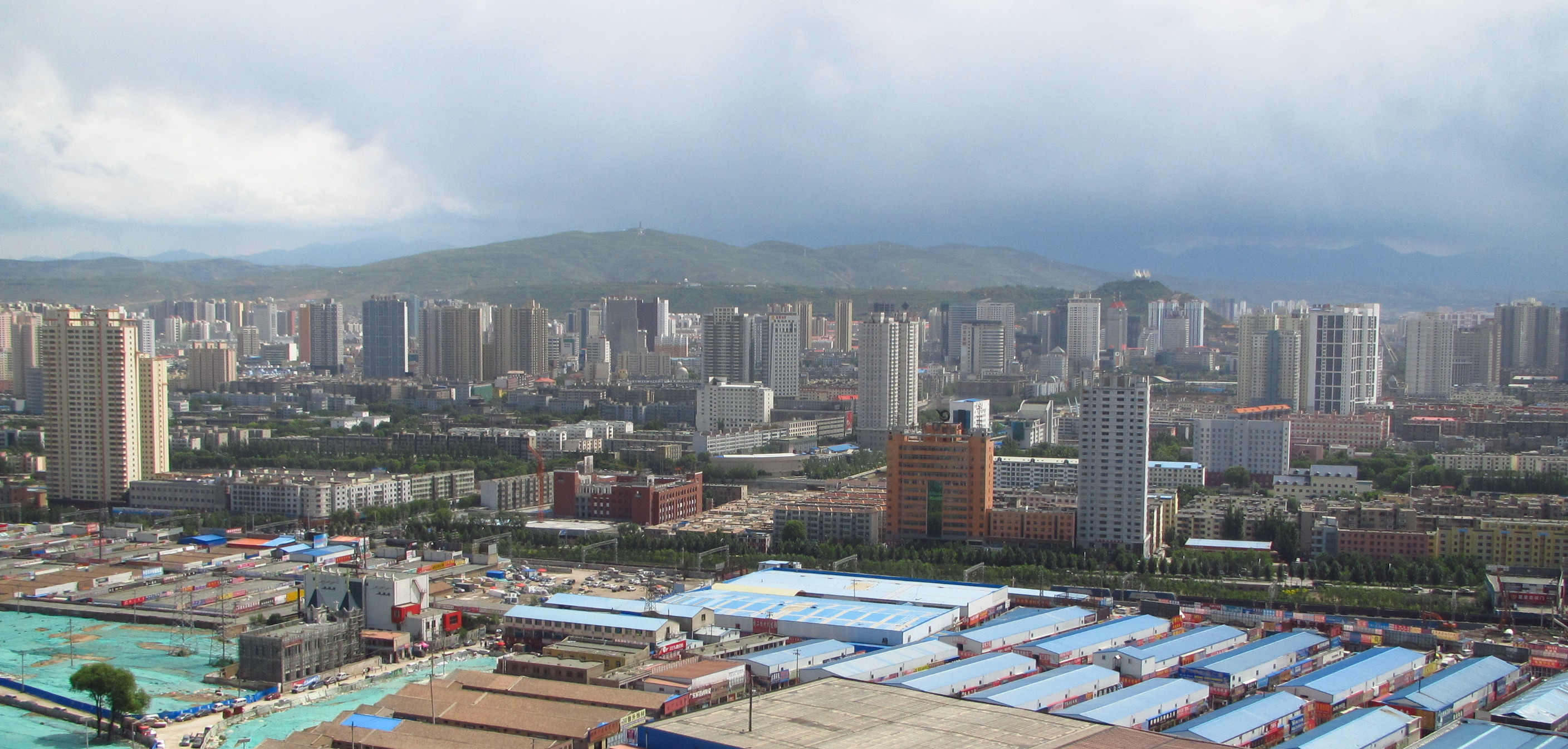
View of partial Xining skyline from the north

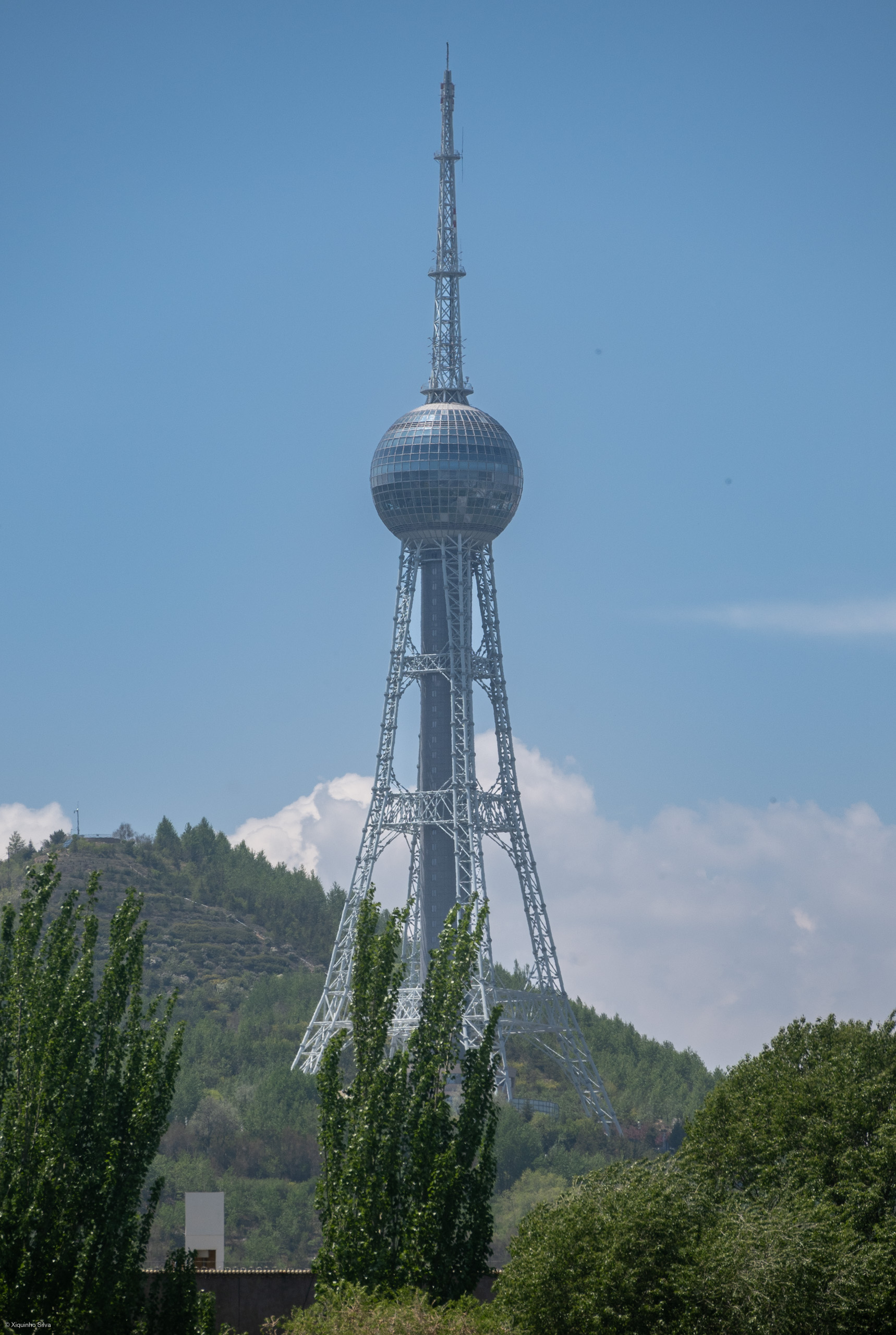
Plateau Pearl Sightseeing Tower

The GDP per capita was 49,200 RMB (US$7,897) in 2015. Its main industries are wool spinning and textiles, fur, meat, milk, salt, and light processing industries.

=== Economic and Technological Development Zones ===
- Xining Economic & Technological Development Zone

Xining Economic & Technological Development Zone XETDZ) was approved as state-level development zone in July 2000. It has a planned area of 4.4 km^{2} (1.7 sq mi). XETDZ lies in the east of Xining, 5 km (3.1 mi) away from downtown. The XETDZ is the first of its kind at the national level on the Qinghai-Tibet Plateau. It is established to fulfill the nation's strategy of developing the west.

XETDZ has a convenient transportation system, connected by the Xining–Lanzhou expressway and run through by two main roads, the broadest roads of the city. It is 4 km (2.5 mi) away from the railway station, 15 km (9.3 mi) from Xining Airport.

It focuses on the development of following industries: chemicals based on salt lake resources, nonferrous metals, and petroleum and natural gas processing; special medicine, foods and bio-chemicals using local plateau animals and plants; new products involving ecological and environmental protection, high technology, new materials as well as information technology; and services such as logistics, banking, real estate, tourism, hotel, catering, agency and international trade.

== Demographics ==
According to the 2020 Chinese census, the prefecture-level city of Xining has a population of 2,467,965 people (compared to 2,208,708 as of the 2010 Chinese census), of whom 1,954,795 lived in the built-up (or metro) area made of 5 urban districts.

At present, four districts, three counties and a national economic and technological development zone are under the administration of the local government. With a population of more than two million, Xining is the first city on the upper reaches of the Yellow River to achieve a population in the millions.

=== Ethnic diversity ===
There are about 37 nationalities living here, though only the Han, Hui, Monguor/Tu and Tibetans are numerically significant. Local traditions and customs are influenced by the Tibetans, Monguor, Muslims and Han. In the 2010 Census numbers, Han Chinese represent 74.04 percent of the total population of Xining, while Hui (16.26 percent), Tibetan (5.51 percent) and Tu (2.6 percent) are the main minority groups in the city.

=== Religion ===
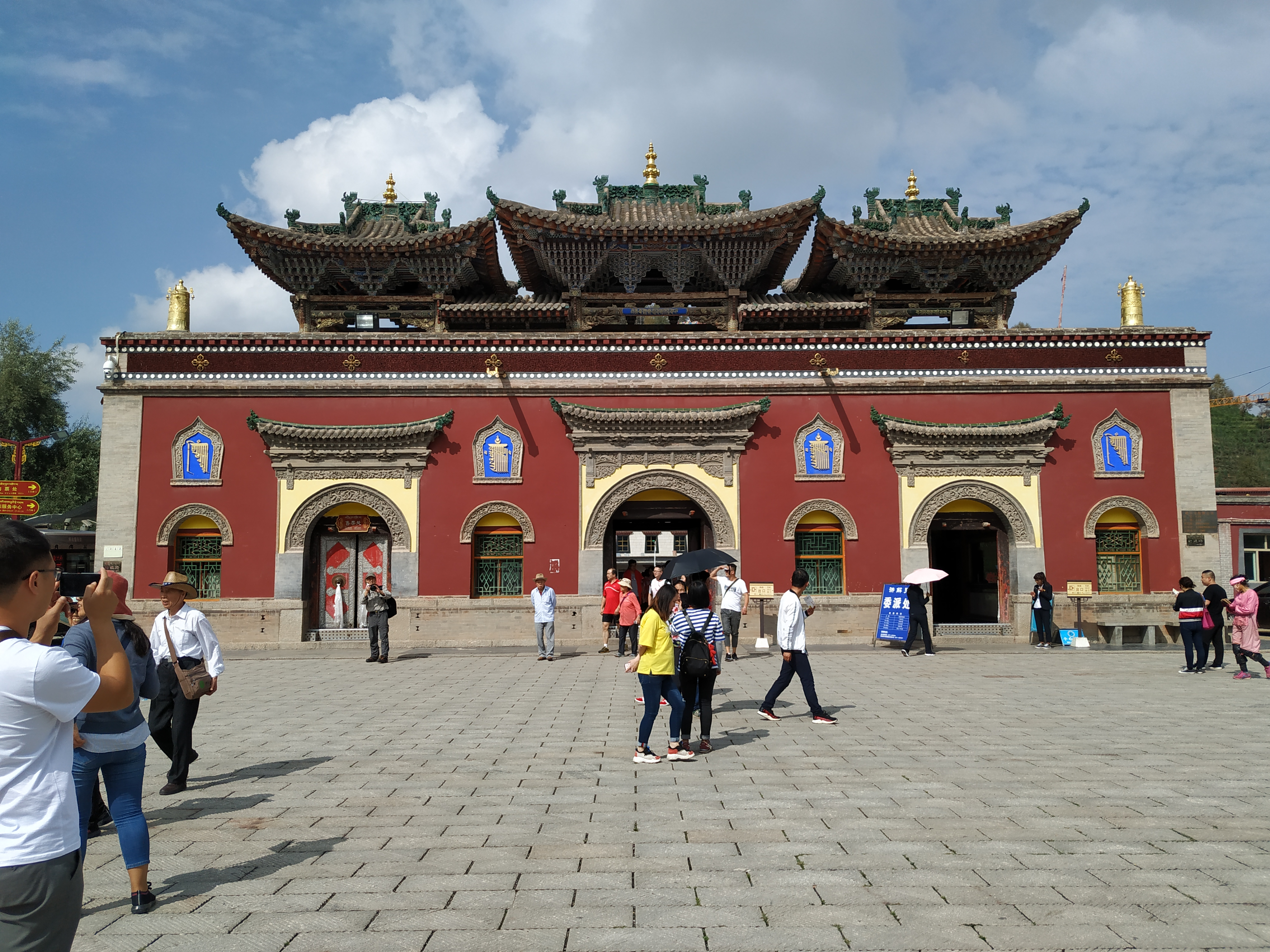
Kumbum Monastery

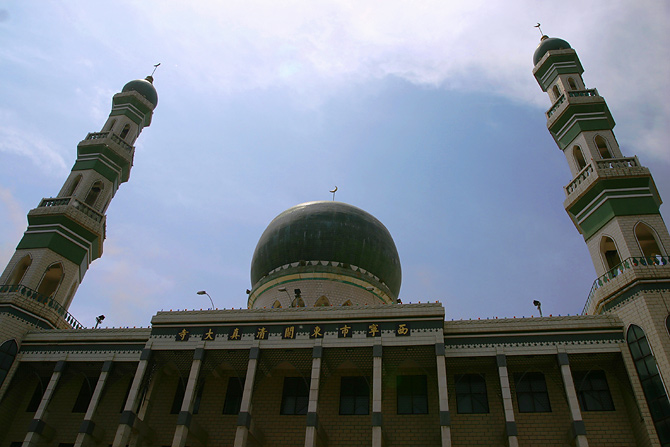
The Dongguan Mosque

Located in the southwest part of Xining City, the Kumbum Monastery or Ta'er Monastery is one of six famous monasteries in the Gelug (also called Yellow Hat Sect) of Tibetan Buddhism and has hundreds of monks.

Having a history of over 600 years, the Dongguan Mosque, located in the Xining City Zone, is one of the most famous mosques in the northwest region of China. It has diversiform towers, walls and halls in the mosque.

Another unique religious structure is the Beishan Si (North Mountain Temple), a Taoist facility.

There are more than 300 Christian meeting points in Xining.

The Catholic minority is pastorally served by the (pre-diocesan) Apostolic Prefecture of Xining.

== Administrative divisions ==
The municipality oversees seven districts and counties. The data here are presented in km^{2} and in population according to 2010 Census:

Map
Name	Simplified Chinese	Hanyu Pinyin	Area (km^{2})	Population (2010)	Density (/km^{2})
Urban
Chengzhong District	城中区	Chéngzhōng Qū	11	296,987	26,999
Chengdong District	城东区	Chéngdōng Qū	115	359,688	3,128
Chengxi District	城西区	Chéngxī Qū	79	242,627	3,071
Chengbei District	城北区	Chéngběi Qū	138	299,002	2,167
Suburban
Huangzhong District	湟中区	Huángzhōng Qū	2,430	437,835	180
Rural
Huangyuan County	湟源县	Huángyuán Xiàn	1,609	136,632	85
Datong Hui and Tu; Autonomous County	大通回族土族自治县	Dàtōng Huízú Tǔzú Zìzhìxiàn	3,090	435,937	139

== Education ==
=== Colleges and universities ===
- Qinghai University
- Qinghai Normal University
- Qinghai University for Nationalities

=== Private schools ===
Xining International Academy is an English-language international school.

== Transportation ==
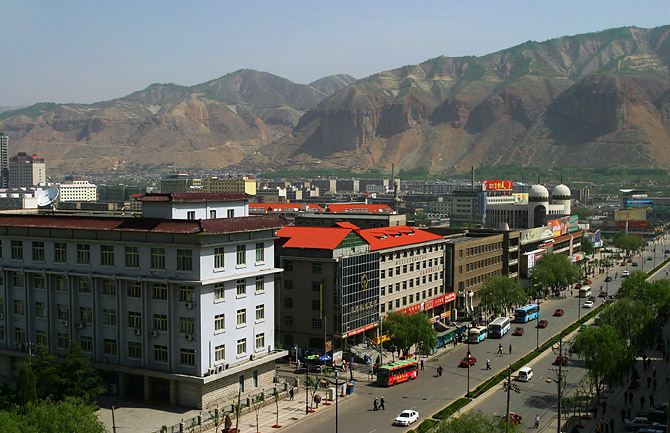
Jianguo Avenue in Xining, prior to 2013 reconstruction of the railway station

Xining is situated in a fertile mountain basin in the valley of the Huangshui (river), a tributary of the Yellow River, that acts as a river port. The city lies about 200 km (120 mi) west of Lanzhou, the capital of Gansu province, on what was traditionally the main trade route from northern China into Tibet and the Qaidam Basin. These routes are now followed by modern highways.

=== Railway ===
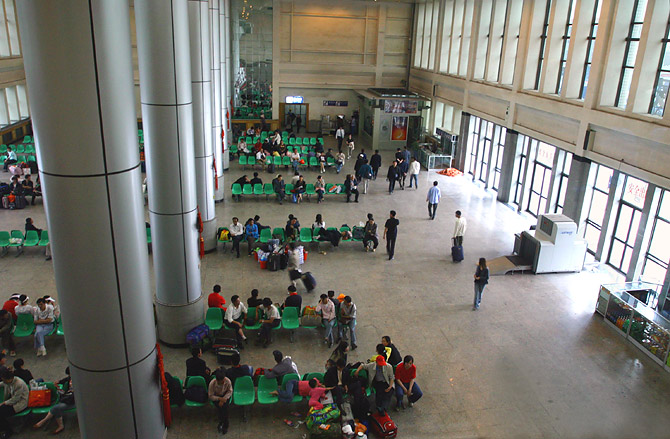
Inside the Xining railway station

Since 1959 Xining station has been connected by the Lanzhou–Qinghai Railway to China's railway network. Later, this railway was extended into the Qaidam area via Haiyan near Qinghai Lake to Golmud, and, since 2006, to Lhasa, Tibet. (See the Qinghai–Tibet Railway).

The second major railway serving Xining is the Lanzhou–Xinjiang High-Speed Railway, opened in December 2014. When first opened, it just provided high-speed train service to Lanzhou and Urumqi (and points in between). With the opening of the Baoji–Lanzhou high-speed railway on July 9, 2017, it has been connected to the rest of the nation's high-speed rail network.

Unlike many other Chinese cities, where the conventional and high-speed trains stop at different train stations, Xining railway station is served by both types of trains. Thus it can be used as a transfer point for e.g. a passenger traveling from Xinjiang to Tibet.

=== Air ===
Xining Caojiapu International Airport serves the area with regularly scheduled passenger flights to major Chinese cities including Beijing, Shanghai, Hong Kong, Chengdu, Kunming, Xi'an, and Wuhan.

=== Highway ===
- China National Highway 214
- China National Highway 227
- China National Highway 315
- G6 Beijing–Lhasa Expressway

== Food ==
Xining's cuisine is distinct from other Chinese cities and mainly uses food products native to the area.

Local specialties include: Feng'er Liji (a round lamb tenderloin), Danbai Chongcao Ji (a medicine cuisine made of chicken, Chinese caterpillar fungus and eggs), and Jinyu Facai (pork wrapped in flagelliform nostoc and shaped as a goldfish).

There are also many small restaurants offering noodles. Gan Ban is a very common noodle dish. Perhaps Mian Pian, which means "noodle leaves" is the most common noodle plate among the Qinghai people. On the streets, many Muslims sell spicy lamb brochettes. Due to the cold climate, residents of Xining are also fond of strong spirits; Xining has the reputation of being one of the regions of heaviest alcohol consumption in China.
