= Heilongjiang University of Technology =

University in Jixi, China

- Motto: 修德修能，成人成事
- Type: Provincial
- Established: 1958
- President: Yu Kaisheng
- Faculty: 495
- Students: 8,206
- Location: Jixi, China
- Website: Jxdx.edu.cn

Heilongjiang University of Technology (simplified Chinese: 黑龙江工业学院; traditional Chinese: 黑龍江工業學院; pinyin: Hēilóngjiāng Gōngyè Xuéyuàn), formerly named Jixi University (simplified Chinese: 鸡西大学; traditional Chinese: 雞西大學; pinyin: Jīxī Dàxué), is a provincial university in Jixi, Heilongjiang Province. It was founded in 1958.

== History ==
In 2013, Jixi University was renamed as Heilongjiang University of Technology.
