= Heilongjiang University of Chinese Medicine =

University in Harbin, China

Coordinates: 45.72508°N 126.64948°E

- 黑龙江中医药大学 (Chinese)
- Type: Public
- Established: 1959
- President: Guo Hong Wei
- Location: Harbin, Heilongjiang, China
- Campus: Urban
- Website: www.hljucm.edu.cn

Chinese name
- Simplified Chinese: 黑龙江中医药大学
- Traditional Chinese: 黑龍江中醫藥大學
Transcriptions
Standard Mandarin
- Hanyu Pinyin: Hēilóngjiāng Zhōngyīyào Dàxué

Heilongjiang University of Chinese Medicine (Chinese: 黑龙江中医药大学; pinyin: Hēilóngjiāng Zhōngyīyào Dàxué) is a public medical university in Harbin, China. It was founded in 1959.
