= Heilongjiang International University =

University in Harbin, China

- Type: Private
- President: Deng Zhongxing
- Students: 10,000
- Location: Harbin, China
- Campus: Suburban
- Website: www.hiu.edu.cn

Chinese name
- Simplified Chinese: 黑龙江外国语学院
- Traditional Chinese: 黑龍江外國語學院
Transcriptions
Standard Mandarin
- Hanyu Pinyin: Hēilóngjiāng Wàiguóyǔ Xuéyuàn

Heilongjiang International University (Chinese: 黑龙江外国语学院), formerly known as Star College of Harbin Normal University is a university located in Harbin, Heilongjiang, China.

Heilongjiang International University is situated in Jiangbei, north of the city centre. It developed from a small language college but now has expanded to close to 12,000 students. It offers a range of majors including Business, English, Chinese, Art and Modern Technology.

Heilongjiang International University has a special affiliation with the London Southbank University.

== See also ==
- List of universities in China
