= Harbin University of Commerce =

University in Harbin, China

Coordinates: 45.7375°N 126.605083°E

Harbin Commercial University (Chinese: 哈尔滨商业大学; pinyin: Hārbīn Shāngyè Dàxué), also known as Harbin University of Commerce, is a university in Harbin, China. It was the first multidisciplinary commercial university in China.

== Journals published ==
- Commercial Research
- Journal of Harbin Commercial University (Natural Science Edition)
- Journal of Harbin Commercial University (Social Science Edition)

== Achievements ==
Developed the China's first food machinery-type 406 dumpling-making machine in 1959.
