= Harbin University =

University in Harbin, China

- 哈尔滨学院
- Type: Public
- Established: 1999; 26 years ago
- President: HU BaoZhong (胡宝忠)
- Academic staff: 664
- Location: Harbin, Heilongjiang, China
- Campus: Urban
- Website: www.hrbu.edu.cn

Harbin University (HrbU; Chinese: 哈尔滨学院; pinyin: Hā'ěrbīn Xuéyuàn) is a comprehensive college located in Harbin, Heilongjiang Province, People's Republic of China. In 1999, the original four municipal schools and two colleges (Harbin Teachers College, Harbin University, Harbin Institute of Education, Harbin Adult Education College, Harbin Normal School, and Harbin School of Finance and Economics) were integrated to form Harbin University.
