= Heilongjiang University of Science and Technology =

University in China

Coordinates: 45.82055°N 126.65237°E

- 黑龙江科技大学
- Motto: 厚德博学、强吾兴邦
- Type: Public
- Established: 1947
- President: Junfeng Wu (武俊峰)
- Faculty: 1,229
- Students: 24,742
- Postgraduates: 832
- Location: Puyuan Road, Songbei District, Harbin, China
- Campus: Urban, 1.2883 square kilometres (0.4974 mi^{2})
- Website: www.usth.edu.cn

Heilongjiang University of Science and Technology (USTH; simplified Chinese: 黑龙江科技大学; traditional Chinese: 黑龍江科技大學; pinyin: Heilongjiang Keji Daxue), founded in 1947, used to be a specialist school on mining technology. After developments in decades, it is now a multi-disciplinary university with its main disciplines engineering, management, social science, and natural science.

== History ==
In 1947, a mining school was found in Jixi, which was the first mining school in northeast China. In 1954, the school was incorporated with Hegang Mineralogy School, and named as Jixi Mineralogy School. In 1958, Jixi Mineralogy College with Bachelor education was found based on Jixi Mineralogy School. The college was renamed as Heilongjiang Institute of Mineralogy in 1981, and Heilongjiang Institute of Science and Technology in 2000. In 2001, the institute starts a new campus in Harbin, and in 2003 the main campus moved from Jixi to Harbin. In 2013, the institute was renamed as Heilongjiang University of Science and Technology. In October 16, 2014, the Heilongjiang provincial people's Government and the State administration of work safety to build the Heilongjiang University of science and technology agreement signing ceremony was held in the University of science and technology in Heilongjiang.

== Colleges and departments ==
- School of Mining Engineering
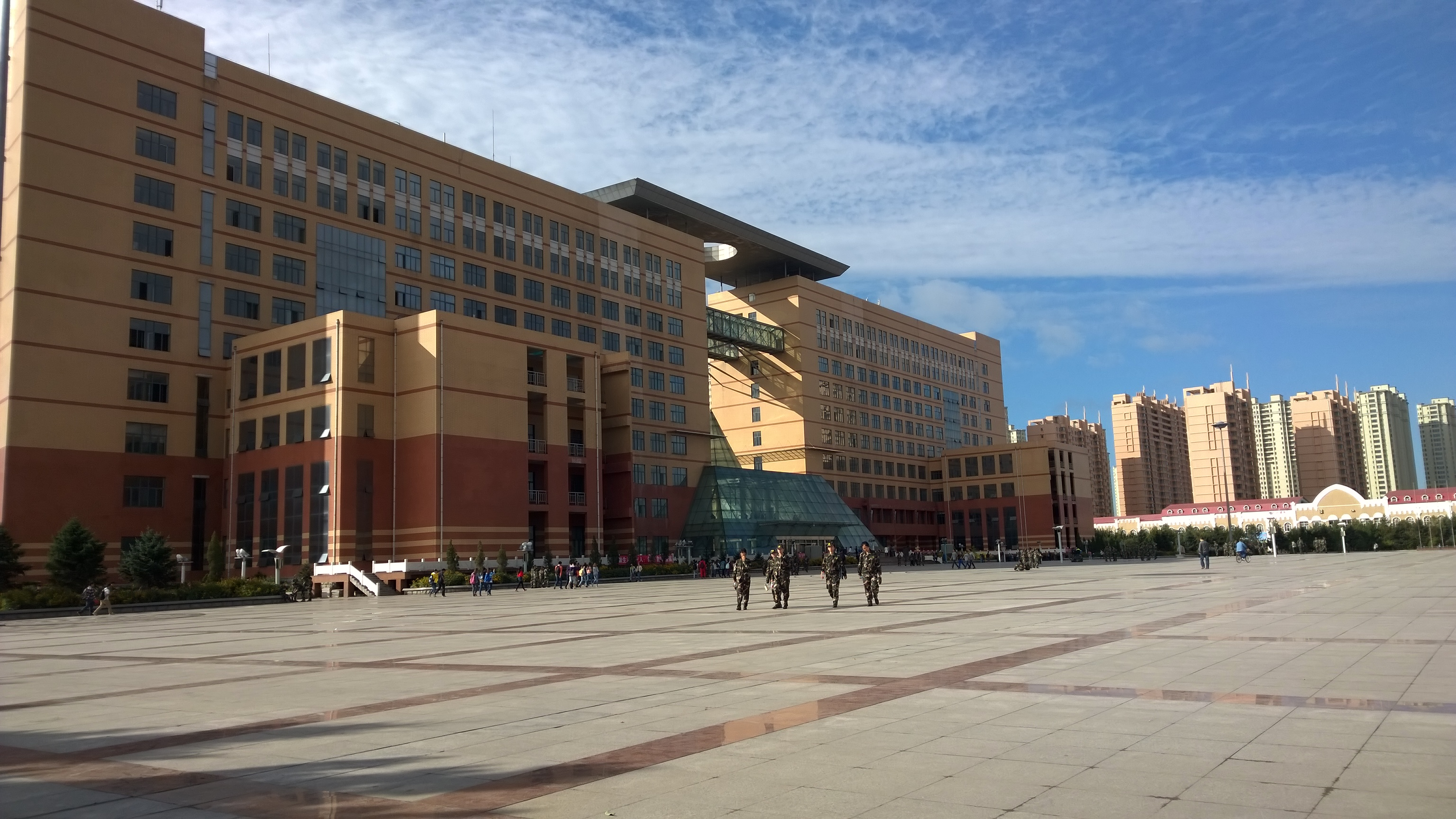
- School of Electrical Control Engineering
- School of Electrical Information Engineering
- School of Mechanical Engineering
- College of Environmental and Chemical Engineering
- School of Safety Engineering
- School of Material Science and Engineering]
- School of Civil Engineering
- School of Computer and Information Engineering
- School of Humanity and Social Science
- College of Science
- School of Management
- Economic College
- College of Foreign Languages

== Partnerships ==
Heilongjiang University of Science and Technology has established international partnerships with universities and colleges from Russia and Canada. Particularly close partnerships are maintained with the following universities

- (Russia) Far Eastern Federal University
- (Canada) Northern Alberta Institute of Technology
- (Canada) Douglas College
