= Qinghai University =

Provincial public university in Xining, Qinghai, China

- 青海大学
- Type: Public university
- Established: 1958; 68 years ago
- Students: 27,000
- Location: Xining, Qinghai, China
- Website: qhu.edu.cn

Qinghai University (QHU; Chinese: 青海大学; pinyin: Qīnghǎi Dàxué) is a provincial public university in Xining, Qinghai, China. It is affiliated with the Province of Qinghai, and co-sponsored by the Qinghai Provincial People's Government and the Ministry of Education of China. The university is part of Project 211 and the Double First-Class Construction.

It was established in 1958. As of July 2020, there are 67 undergraduate majors; 5 doctoral degree authorization points, 57 master's degree authorization points, 40 master's degree authorization fields, and 69 undergraduate majors; 15 colleges and 26 departments; there are 4,615 faculty members and more than 27,000 students.

== History ==
Qinghai University is one of the universities within Qinghai Province. It is situated in Xining in Tibet Plateau. Qinghai University was founded in 1958.

== Campus ==
The university campus covers an area of over 2,692 acres (10.89 km^{2}) divided into five districts.

As of April 2018, the school has 15 colleges, 26 departments (departments) and 14 professional research institutes, with 69 undergraduate majors.

As of April 2018, the school has 4,615 faculty members, including 2,565 medical and full-time scientific research personnel, 1,467 full-time teachers. Among the full-time teachers, there are 329 doctors and 87% of them have master's degrees or above. The school has 1 academician of the Chinese Academy of Sciences and 7 dual-employed academicians. 4 specially-appointed professors in the "Changjiang Scholars Award Program" of the Ministry of Education and 2 winners of the National "Outstanding Youth Fund" were selected into the national "Ten Thousand Talents Program", "National Hundreds and Thousand Talents Project", "New Century Excellent Talents Support Program" There are 20 talents at the national level, 31 people who enjoy the "Special Allowance from the State Council", won the National Innovation Award, the Hong Kong Ho Leung Ho Lee Foundation Science and Technology Innovation Award, the Fok Ying Tung Education Foundation Young Teacher Award, the Chinese Overseas Chinese Community (Innovative Talents) Contribution Award, Three World National Academy of Sciences, the world's only basic medicine award and other 11 people, more than 30 national and provincial teaching teachers, outstanding teachers, educators, more than 60 provincial outstanding experts, outstanding professional and technical personnel, 9 team projects, Qinghai Province "135" There are more than 160 high-level talents and provincial leaders in natural science and engineering technology. One team was selected as the "Innovative Team Development Plan of the Ministry of Education", one team was selected as the "National University Huang Danian Teacher Team", and 16 research teams were selected as the "Qinghai Province Talent Highland".

Academician of Chinese Academy of Sciences (1): Wang Guangqian (supported by Tsinghua University). Top Young Talent of the "Ten Thousand Talents Program" of the Organization Department of the Central Committee (1): Xiao Lu. Qinghai University Qinghai University Winners of the National Science Fund for Distinguished Young Scholars (2): Mei Shengwei, Chen Wenguang. State Council Special Allowance Experts (31): Ma Yushou, Ma Xiaogang, Mao Xuerong, Wang Jian, Wang Jianjun, Wang Chunying, Wen Shaodun, Deng Yong, Daga, Liu Shujie, Liu Hongxing, Liu Qingyuan, Xu Cunhe, Chi Dezhao, Li Lirong, Li Jie, Du Dezhi, Chen Gang, Zhang Caijun, Zhang Dengshan, Zhang Yongcheng, Zhou Qingping, Yu Hongxian, Gerili, Geng Paili, Tang Daocheng, Tie Shengnian, Wei Dengbang, etc. New Century Talent Project (2): Du Dezhi, Liu Yujiao. Innovative Talent Promotion Plan of the Ministry of Science and Technology (1 person): Qi Delin. National Outstanding Professional and Technical Talents (2): Du Dezhi, Gree Li. Hong Kong Ho Leung Ho Lee Foundation Science and Technology Innovation Award (2 winners): Du Dezhi, Greeley. Fok Yingdong Education Foundation Young Teacher Award (2 persons): Zhang Hongyan, Chen Yonghua.

As of July 2020, the school has 1 world-class construction discipline, 2 domestic first-class disciplines, 1 provincial first-class discipline, 2 national key disciplines, 16 provincial key disciplines, and 5 doctoral degree authorization points. There are 17 first-level discipline master's degree authorization points, 136 second-level master's degree authorization points, 9 professional master's degree authorization categories covering 50 fields, and 1 post-doctoral research mobile station. World-class discipline construction discipline: ecology National key disciplines (including cultivation): internal medicine (altitude medicine), crop genetics and breeding. Provincial key disciplines: agronomy, animal medicine, animal science, grassland science, water conservancy and hydropower engineering, mechanical manufacturing and automation, chemical engineering and technology, basic medicine, preventive medicine, Tibetan medicine, business administration, civil engineering, horticulture, Regional economics, etc. First-level discipline doctoral program: crop science. Second-level doctoral programs: crop cultivation and farming, crop genetics and breeding, pasture genetics and farming, internal medicine (high altitude medicine), ethnic medicine (Tibetan medicine). First-level master's programs: mechanical engineering, water conservancy engineering, chemical engineering and technology, geological resources and geological engineering, landscape architecture, crop science, forestry, grassland science, basic medicine, business administration.

As of July 2020, the school has 6 national characteristic professional construction sites, 4 national teaching teams, 1 national talent training model innovation experimental zone, 1 national experimental teaching demonstration center, and 1 national quality bilingual demonstration course. 3 national quality video open courses, 1 national quality online open course, 5 national first-class majors, 9 national excellence plan projects, 1 national off-campus practice education base for college students, national comprehensive professional reform projects 1 item. National specialties: chemical engineering technology, grassland science, Tibetan medicine, preventive medicine, resource exploration engineering, economics. National teaching team: Tibetan medicine teaching team, basic medicine teaching team. National Excellent Course: Tibetan Medicine and Pharmacology. National Experimental Teaching Demonstration Center: Tibetan Medicine Experimental Teaching Demonstration Center. National Bilingual Teaching Demonstration Course: Management. National Key Laboratory: Agricultural Products Quality and Safety Risk Assessment Laboratory (Xining) of the Ministry of Agriculture. National Education Reform System Pilot Project of the Ministry of Education: Innovating the training model of Tibetan medicine talents in Tibetan areas. Provincial Experimental Teaching Demonstration Center: Electrical and Electronic Experimental Teaching Demonstration Center, Chemistry and Chemical Engineering Experimental Teaching Demonstration Center, Biological Science Experimental Teaching Demonstration Center, Basic Medical Experimental Teaching Demonstration Center, Tibetan Medicine Experimental Teaching Demonstration Center, etc. Provincial quality courses: Basic Traditional Chinese Medicine, Tibetan Medicine Prescriptions, Immunology, Pathology, Epidemiology, Internal Medicine, College English, Computer Basics, Enterprise Strategic Management, Botany, Analytical Chemistry, Livestock Anatomy and Histology, Engineering Training, statistics, basic programming, soil mechanics and basic engineering, civil engineering materials, automatic control theory, etc.

While receiving counterpart support from universities such as Tsinghua University, Northwest A&F University, China University of Geosciences (Beijing), East China University of Science and Technology, the school has established successively with well-known foreign universities such as Massachusetts Institute of Technology, Kochi University in Japan, and Oakland University in New Zealand. Established a good inter-university collaboration relationship, and successively signed exchange and cooperation agreements with universities in more than 20 countries and regions including the United States, the United Kingdom, Australia, New Zealand, Japan, South Korea, Taiwan, etc. In 2014, it established Qinghai-Utah Plateau Medicine with the University of Utah The Joint Key Laboratory launched a new round of Tsinghua University-Auckland University-Qinghai University "Three Brothers" model cooperation project. The "Qinghai-Utah Technology Innovation Alliance" led by Qinghai University and the "Utah-Qinghai Industrial Technology Innovation Strategic Alliance" of Utah, the United States joined the Sino-US Green Partnership and were included in the 10-year framework of Sino-US energy and environmental cooperation. Cooperation in medicine, salt lake chemical industry and ecological environment. According to the school's official website in October 2017, Qinghai University has joined the 121 double degree program of the China Educational International Exchange Association (CEAIE) under the Ministry of Education and the China Education Exchange Center (CCIEE) "China Talent Training Program". The university signed cooperation agreements; and established channels for students to study abroad and exchange with universities in the United States, Britain, New Zealand, Turkmenistan, and Taiwan. Breakthroughs have been achieved in the joint training of students studying abroad, the high-level university graduate program of the China Scholarship Council, the qualification of the Chinese government scholarship institution, the acceptance of foreign students to study in the school, and the exchange of students to Taiwan.

== Library ==
As of the end of 2017, the total number of paper documents in the library collection of the school was 1.67 million, of which the total number of documents in the library collection of the school was 880,000, covering science, engineering, agriculture, literature, history, classics, philosophy, law, and education More than a dozen disciplines such as management, management and medicine. It has 77 well-known databases at home and abroad, 800,000 types of e-books, and nearly 48,000 types of e-journals.

The school publishes "Journal of Qinghai University", "Journal of Qinghai University Medical College", "Qinghai Journal of Animal Husbandry and Veterinary Medicine", "Qinghai Agriculture and Forestry Science and Technology" and other academic journals. Among them, "Journal of Qinghai University" is a comprehensive academic of natural sciences sponsored by Qinghai University. It was founded in January 1983 and was originally called "Journal of Qinghai Institute of Technology". In 1988, the name of the university was changed to "Journal of Qinghai University".

It is well equipped with first-class facilities, notably in the areas of science and technology.

According to the school's official website in June 2016, in recent years, the school has obtained 1,452 scientific research projects of various levels and received 470 million yuan in funding. Among them, there are 289 projects including the National Science and Technology Support Plan, the National Basic Research and Development Plan (973), the National High-Tech Research and Development Plan (863), the National Natural Science Foundation of China, and the National Philosophy and Social Science Foundation. Completed 790 various scientific research projects and obtained 488 achievements, including 10 internationally advanced, 32 internationally advanced, and 35 new varieties cultivated. Won 1 National Science and Technology Progress Award, 1 Second Prize, 2 National Teaching Achievement Awards, 2 First Prizes for Science and Technology Progress of the Ministry of Education, 2 Major Contribution Awards for Science and Technology in Qinghai Province, and Science and Technology Progress Award of Qinghai There are 35 awards and 13 awards for philosophy and social sciences of Qinghai Province. Published more than 7,900 academic papers in various domestic and foreign journals, and published 3 academic papers in top international academic journals "Science" and "Nature".

A building and developing plan geared to the needs of the 21st century has been made for the university and is being implemented.

== Rankings ==
Qinghai University is consistently ranked the best in Qinghai, China. Since 2019, it has been ranked among the top 300 nationwide by the Best Chinese Universities Ranking. As of 2023, the Best Chinese Universities Ranking, also known as the "Shanghai Ranking", placed the university 205th in China.

Globally, Qinghai University was ranked # 1373 by the University Rankings by Academic Performance 2023–2024.
