= Hristo =

Христо
- Romanisation: Hristo, Christo, Khristo
- Pronunciation: Bulgarian: [ˈxristo]
- Gender: Masculine
- Language: Bulgarian

Origin
- Language: Ancient Greek
- Origin: Χριστός
- Meaning: 'the anointed one'
- Region of origin: Bulgaria

Other names
- Short form: Itso
- Related names: Hristina

Hristo (Bulgarian: Христо), also transliterated Christo or Khristo, is a Bulgarian masculine given name, ultimately derived from "Christ". Notable people with the name include:

- Hristo Arangelov (born 1978), Bulgarian footballer
- Hristo Batandzhiev (died 1913), Bulgarian revolutionary
- Hristo Baykov- Bulgarian professional truck driver
- Hristo Bonev (born 1947), Bulgarian footballer
- Hristo Botev (1848–1876), Bulgarian poet and national revolutionary
- Hristo Chernopeev (1868–1915), Bulgarian revolutionary and member of the revolutionary movement in Macedonia
- Hristo Donchev (born 1928), Bulgarian cross country skier
- Khristo Furnigov (born 1966), retired boxer from Bulgaria
- Hristo Georgiev (canoeist), Bulgarian sprint canoeist
- Hristo Georgiev (patron) (1824–1872), Bulgarian entrepreneur and philanthropist
- Hristo Gospodinov (born 1979), Bulgarian football midfielder
- Hadzhi Hristo (1821–1829), Bulgarian revolutionary
- Hristo Iliev (volleyball player) (born 1951), Bulgarian volleyball player
- Hristo Koilov (born 1969), Bulgarian footballer
- Hristo Lukov (1887–1943), Bulgarian general who led the Union of Bulgarian National Legions (SBNL)
- Hristo Makedonski (1835–1916), Bulgarian hajduk voivode and revolutionary
- Khristo Markov (born 1965), triple jumper from Bulgaria
- Hristo Markov (footballer) (born 1985), Bulgarian footballer
- Hristo Mladenov (1928–1996), Bulgarian football player and manager
- Hristo Nikolov – Choko (born 1939), Bulgarian football player
- Hristo Prodanov (1943–1984), Bulgarian mountaineer
- Hristo Shopov (born 1964), Bulgarian actor
- Hristo Silyanov (1880–1939), Bulgarian revolutionary, historian and memoirist
- Hristo Smirnenski (1898–1923), Bulgarian poet and prose writer
- Hristo Stambolski (1843–1932), Bulgarian physician, revolutionary, statesman, and figure of the Bulgarian National Revival
- Hristo Stoichkov (born 1966), Bulgarian footballer and football manager
- Hristo Stoyanov (born 1953), Bulgarian volleyball player
- Hristo Tatarchev (1869–1952), Bulgarian revolutionary and leader of the revolutionary movement in Macedonia and Eastern Thrace
- Hristo Tsvetanov (born 1978), Bulgarian male volleyball player
- Hristo Turlakov (born 1979), Bulgarian figure skater
- Hristo Uzunov (1878–1905), Bulgarian revolutionary of the Internal Macedonian Revolutionary Organization
- Hristo Yanev (born 1979), Bulgarian football player
- Hristo Yasenov (1889–1925), Bulgarian poet and journalist
- Hristo Yovov (born 1977), Bulgarian footballer
- Hristo Zahariev, Bulgarian basketball player
- Hristo Zlatinski (born 1985), Bulgarian football player

== See also ==
- Christo (name)
- Hristov, the derived surname
