= Baykov =

Baykov, Baikov or Baikoff (Russian: Байков) is a Russian masculine surname, its feminine counterpart is Baykova or Baikova. It may refer to

- Alexander Baykov (1870–1946), Russian scientist
- Alina Baikova, Ukrainian fashion model and businesswoman
- Andrey Baykov (born 1984), Russian scholar in international relations
- Evgenia Baykova (1907–1997), Russian painter
- Fyodor Baykov (c. 1612–1663), the first Russian envoy to China
- Ilya Baykov, personal coachman of Tsar Alexander I of Russia
- Leonid Baykov (1919–1994), Russian painter
- Nikolai Baykov (1872–1958), officer of the imperial Russian army, and explorer, a naturalist and a hunter
- Peter Baykov (born 1998), Bulgarian actor
- Vadim Baykov (born 1965), Russian composer
- Viktor Baykov (born 1935), Soviet marathon runner

== See also ==
<!- extra interwiki to dab-->
