= 15th Operational Brigade =

15th Operational Assignment Kara Dag Brigade (2023–) 9th Special Purpose Regiment (1994–2023)
- 15-та бригада оперативного призначення НГ (Ukrainian)
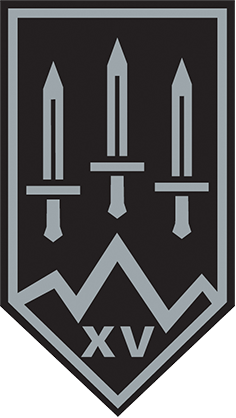
- Brigade Insignia
- Founded: 1994
- Country: Ukraine
- Branch: Internal Troops of Ukraine (1994-2014); National Guard of Ukraine
- Type: Brigade
- Part of: Offensive Guard; 1st Azov Corps
- Garrison/HQ: Zaporizhzhia
- Nickname: Kara Dag Brigade
- Patron: Lieutenant Bohdan Zavada
- Motto: "Raise the flag over Crimea."
- Anniversaries: 1 June
- Engagements: Russo-Ukrainian war: War in Donbas; Russian invasion of Ukraine
- Decorations: For Courage and Bravery

Commanders
- Current commander: Lt. Col. Oleksandr Bukatar

Insignia
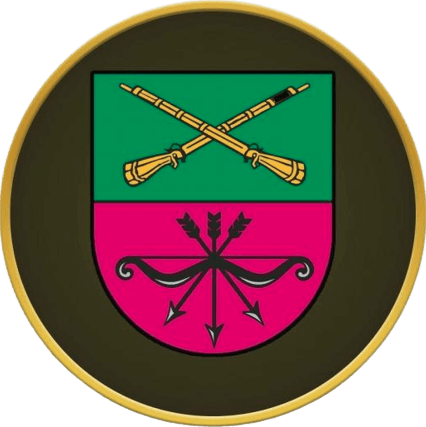
- Former Insignia (?-2023)

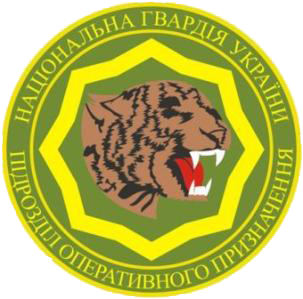
- Former Insignia (2014-?)

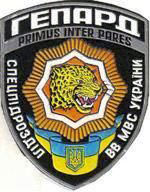
- Former Insignia (1994-2014)

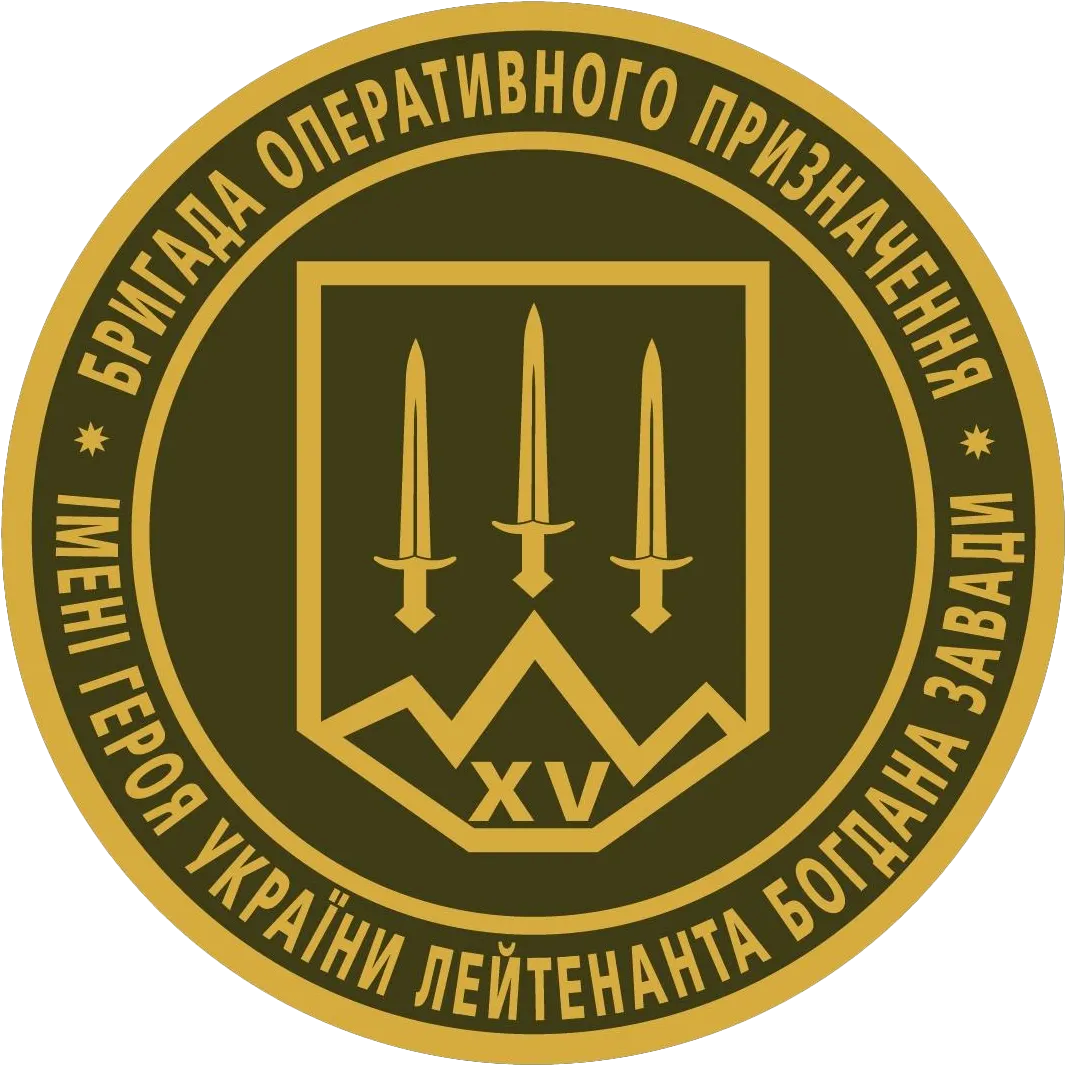
- Former Insignia (?-2025)

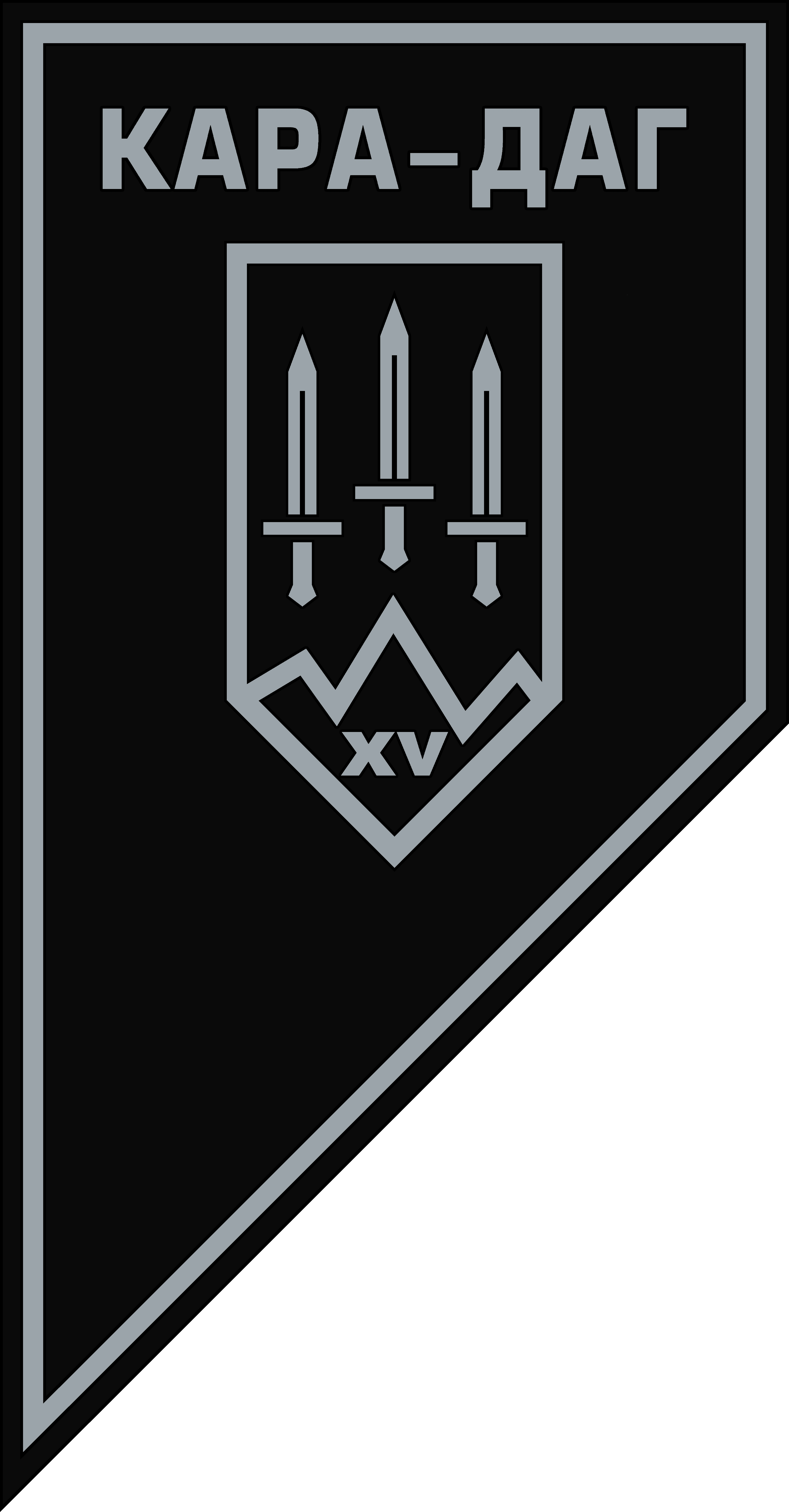
- Flag

The 15th Operational Assignment Kara Dag Brigade "Hero of Ukraine Lieutenant Bohdan Zavada" is a brigade of the National Guard of Ukraine. It is a part of the Ukrainian Offensive Guard and was established as the 9th Special Purpose Regiment in 1994 at the village of Shiroky in Zaporizhzhia Oblast. It has taken part in multiple engagements throughout the Russo-Ukrainian war and is currently deployed on the frontlines in Pokrovsk. It is currently headquartered in Zaporizhzhia City.

== History ==
The brigade was initially created as the 9th Special Purpose Regiment on 1 June 1994 at the village of Shiroky in Zaporizhzhia Oblast to protect public order as a part of the Internal Troops of Ukraine. It was tasked to ensure law and order in case of student uprising, football riots and other events. Its headquarters were then transferred to Zaporizhzhia.

The regiment saw combat on multiple occasions during the War in Donbas. On 16 July 2014, a checkpoint of the National Guard of Ukraine near the border village of Marynivka in Donetsk Oblast was attacked by about a hundred separatists and four armored vehicles, from the villages of Stepanivka and Tarana. They opened fire, prompting the Ukrainian military to retaliate by firing back. Suddenly, two separatist armored personnel carriers came out of the forest to attack the position. So a soldier of the regiment (Zavada Bohdan Oleksiyovych) launched an ATGM destroying a separatist APC, killing 12 separatists, allowing the NG troops to regroup but he himself was killed in action. For his heroic actions, Zavada Bohdan Oleksiyovych was awarded the Hero of Ukraine, the highest military award for Ukrainian personnel. An officer (Ivan Ivanovich Yakushyn) was killed the next day on 17 July 2014 as a result of the wounds sustained in the previous engagement. On 1 August 2014, after the restoration of the National Guard of Ukraine, the 9th Special Purpose Regiment of the Internal Troops "Cheetah", numbering around 1800 personnel was officially reorganized into the 9th Operational Regiment of the Southern Operational Territorial Unit of the National Guard of Ukraine. On 28 October, a checkpoint of MG near Mariupol was attacked by separatists, so an officer of the regiment (Ihor Mykolayovych Yukhymets) coordinated the withdrawal of all troops to safety but was himself killed by a Utyos tank machine gun.

On 19 February 2016, the regiment along with ten other units received permanent official assistance from the Zaporizhzhia Oblast administration. On 20 October 2016, the regiment opened a memorial for its fallen personnel.

On 31 October 2019, the regiment marked the 25th anniversary of its establishment.

On 25 March 2020, the regiment received the honorary name of "Hero of Ukraine Lieutenant Bohdan Zavada". (Note: A fallen soldier of the 9th Regiment and the Hero of Ukraine) On 23 August 2020, the regiment was presented with a Battle Flag and a ribbon. On 21 September 2020, a memorial plaque to the Hero of Ukraine Bohdan Zavada and a new church in honor of John the Warrior were inaugurated. Until 2020, the regiment celebrated the day of the regiment on 31 October, but it was changed to 1 June in 2020.

In August 2021, the regiment received a new Insignia.

The regiment saw combat on multiple occasions during the Russian invasion of Ukraine. On 24 February 2022, the regiment participated in the defense of the settlements of Melitopol, Molochansk, Tokmak, Kamianske, and Mala Tokmachka and stopped Russian forces in the directions of Vasylivka-Zaporizhzhia and Tokmak-Orihiv. On 25 February 2022, a soldier of the regiment (Dmytro Oleksandrovich Kypenko) was killed while operating in Melitopol. On 26 February 2022, the personnel of the regiment engaged Russian troops on the southern outskirts of the city of Molochansk destroying two Russian APCs with crews inside as well as the surrounding infantry, two Russian tanks were damaged and disabled and the Russians retreated the northern outskirts of the city. When Russians again attempted to invade the southwestern outskirts of the city of Tokmak, three Russian tanks were destroyed. The Anti-aircraft units of the brigade destroyed 4 Su-25s, 2 Ka-52s, 2 UAVs, 1 missile, in addition to ground armored vehicles. The regiment took part in defensive operations during the Siege of Mariupol. On 3 March 2022, a Russian column was spotted by Colonel Dmytro Oleksandrovich Apukhtin but one unit of Russian armored vehicles was destroyed before the arrival of the column. On 5 March 2022, in an engagement with a separate Russian group, two Russian armored vehicles and about 20 personnel were neutralized, two more BMP-2s and some personnel were killed on 20 March. On 12 March 2022, Colonel Apukhtin was himself killed in action while saving the lives of other personnel. Colonel Dmytro Oleksandrovich Apukhtin was posthumously awarded the Hero of Ukraine the highest military award for Ukrainian personnel. The brigade also took part in the defense of Zaporizhzhia International Airport to prevent a Russian Air Assault. It also saw action in Orikhiv where a soldier of the brigade (Serhii Volodymyrovych Titov) was killed on 10 May 2022. In May 2022, the brigade participated in the battles for Malinivka and Uspenivka. It also took part in combat in Kamianske during which a soldier of the regiment (Ishchenko Anton Viktorovych) was killed on 14 July 2022. On 6 November 2022, a soldier of the regiment (Stanislav Bloshchynskyi) was killed in Melitopol. On 19 November 2022, a soldier of the brigade (Mykola Vasyliovych Ternopilskyi) was killed in Zaporizhzhia Oblast.

On January 15, 2023, the 9th regiment was reorganized into the 15th Operational Brigade. In February 2023, the 15th Brigade of the Offensive Guard received the name "Kara-Dag after the Kara Dag Mountain. In 2023, it saw combat during the 2023 Ukrainian counteroffensive. On 14 July 2023, the 15th "Kara-Dag" Brigade in cooperation with units of the Armed Forces of Ukraine advanced in the Melitopol advancing 1700m. During the counteroffensive a soldier (Tarasov Ivan Oleksandrovych) was killed on 4 August between the villages of Verbove and Robotyne and another soldier (Roman Viktorovych Nepomyachchi) being killed on 7 August near the village of Mala Tokmachka, followed by one more (Serhii Fedorovych Svynarchuk) on 23 October and another (Prostyakov Radyslav Yakovych) on 26 October 2023.

On 22 February 2024, an officer of the brigade (Petro Mykolayovych Tataryn) was killed as a result of a UAV chemical attack on the brigade's positions on the frontlines. Another soldier of the brigade (Ihor Dubuk) was killed by Russian forces on 6 June 2024 and a third soldier of the brigade (Yuriy Shevchuk) on 18 August. On 30 August 2024, the brigade was sent from Zaporizhzhia Oblast to Donetsk Oblast to stop the Russian forces during the Pokrovsk offensive. On 6 October 2024, during the Battle of Selydove, four guardsmen of the Brigade were captured and executed by Russian forces.

== Structure ==
- 15th Operational Brigade
  - Management and Headquarters
  - 1st Operational Battalion "Citadel"
    - Fire Support Company
  - 2nd Operational Battalion "Amor Fati"
  - 3rd Operational Battalion "Arx Ferrum"
    - 1st Operational Company
  - 4th Operational Battalion "Alliance"
    - 1st Operational Company
    - 2nd Operational Company
    - Mortar Battery
    - Unmanned Systems Strike Company
  - Tank Company
  - Special Purpose Reconnaissance Company
  - "Ghost of Khortytsia" Battalion
    - Unmanned Ground Vehicles Company
    - Crow Company
  - 1st Artillery Battalion "Thunder of Victory"
  - 2nd Artillery Battalion "Stormborn"
  - Self-Propelled Artillery Battalion "Steel Characteristics"
  - Aerial Reconnaissance Battery
  - Anti-Aircraft Missile Battalion
  - Anti-Tank Company
  - Support Battalion
  - Logistics Battalion
  - Automobile Battalion
  - Electronic Warfare Company
  - Signals Company
  - Medical Company
  - Recruitment Service
  - Reserve Rifle Company
  - Special Intelligence and Reconnaissance Company
  - Anti-aircraft Missile Artillery Battery
  - Communications Company
  - Repair Company
  - Material, Logistical and Technical Support Company
  - Combat Support Company
  - Orchestra

== Commanders ==
- Colonel Oleksandr Khomenko (2014–2018)
- Colonel Belyaev Andriy Mykolayovych (2018–2021)
- Colonel Serdiuk Serhii Yuriyovych (2021–2023)
- Colonel Dmytro Vlasenko (2023–2024)
- Colonel Ivan Bondarenko (2024-)

== Sources ==
- "ВГО Спілка ветеранів та працівників силових структур України "Звитяга"". kyiv.osp-ua.info. 2004-11-22. Archived from the original on 2016-06-01.
- "У Київ стягують спецназ. Повний перелік та місця дислокації". Archived from the original on 14 May 2016.
- "В. Цушко. Спецпідрозділи МВС "Гепард" і "Ягуар" знаходяться в місцях дислокації". RBC-Ukraine. 2007-04-04. Archived from the original on 2014-02-21.
- "Куда ехали 150 сотрудников запорожского "Гепарда"?". Day of Zaporozhye. 2007-05-27. Archived from the original on 2014-02-21.
- ""Гепард" перекрив вул. Інститутську". TSN. 2013-12-10. Archived from the original on 2014-02-15.
- В «Гепарді» провели майстер-класи
- «Гепард» відчинив двері
- «Гепард» чистить автобуси від майданівської символіки (фото)
- В Одесу прибув «Гепард»
- «Гепард» перекрив вул. Інститутську
- О. Тягнибок: «Ми не дамо з України зробити колонію Москви»
- Рятувальники нагадали бійцям спецпідрозділу «Гепард» про заходи безпеки в позаслужбовий час (відео)
- МВС почало будувати власні барикади?
- Спецпідрозділи ВВ МВС — «Барс», «Ягуар», «Гепард», «Тигр»
- «Гепард», «Беркут», ВВ-ки і фани регіоналів оточили Раду
- За ночь в Киеве на углу Институтской вырос бетонный блокпост
- В бою на Донбассе, прикрывая личный состав, героически погиб сотрудник «Гепарда»
- Книга пам'яті співробітників запорізької міліції, які загинули при виконанні службових обов'язків
- Арсен Аваков вручив державні нагороди співробітникам МВС, волонтерам, лікарям (фото)
- Запорожский фельдшер, спасший в АТО сослуживца
- Героя Украины запорожца Богдана Заваду суд признал умершим
- Жена и родители погибшего нацгвардейца получили его награду
- Із зони АТО повернулись запорізькі бійці
- Командир запорожской части НГУ: Главный «дед» здесь Я
- Запорожские танки отправились на учения
- В Запорожье комбаты НГУ учились использовать танки и пушки
- В Запорожье гвардейцев оставят в резерве райотделов
- Запорізькі гвардійці влаштували «День відчинених дверей» для школярів (фото)
- Семья Героя Украины живет на улице, которую назовут в честь Богдана Завады
- Рішення Запорізької міської ради No. 51 від 19.02.2016 "Про перейменування вул. Мікояна в Запоріжжі на вул. Богдана Завади
- Женщин-военнослужащих запорожского полка НГУ к празднику обули
- Систему управления адаптируют к стандартам НАТО
- Запорожских гвардейцев поздравили с профессиональным праздником (фото)
- Часть запорожских гвардейцев праздник встретит рядом с зоной АТО — на боевом посту
- Запорожским гвардейцам создали условия, о которых можно только мечтать
- В полк для дальнейшего прохождения военной службы прибыли молодые офицеры — выпускники учебных заведений НГУ
- В полку НГУ очень ждут танкистов, артиллеристов
- В полку Нацгвардии мобилизованные поняли, что здесь нужно иметь трезвый ум
- Запорожский прапорщик обеспечивал гвардейцам связь на линии столкновения
- Запорожским гвардейцам будет на чем спать
- В Запорожье некоторые гвардейцы покидали часть с новенькими погонами
- В Запорожье 13-летний солдат Завада в части своего погибшего отца-героя ходил в строю и стрелял на полигоне
- Запорожские спецназовцы просят построить им баню
- Дети доставили запорожским гвардейцам массу положительных эмоций
- В запорожский полк НГУ гости приходят не с пустыми руками
- Младшие «спецы» артиллерии сразу отправляются на полигон
- В полк НГУ начали прибывать срочники
- Командование в/ч 3029 поздравило журналистов с их профессиональным праздником креативно
- В запорожской части НГУ девушки принимали присягу со слезами на глазах
- Запорожским гвардейцам обещают подарок ко Дню Независимости
- В запорожскую часть НГУ на присягу съехались дети со всей Украины
- Запорожские полицейские нашли табличку с именем Героя Украины, которую со стены дома сорвали негодяи
- Чтобы спасти жизнь раненым, запорожский офицер вывозил их в Россию
- В Запорожье открыли памятную доску герою АТО Богдану Заваде (фото)
- Нацгвардейцы присягнули на верность Украине
- В запорожской части скоро будет актуальной команда «В баню шагом марш!»
- Командир запорожской части: Мы ждем распоряжения об убытии в зону АТО
- Запорожский губернатор получил награду на плацу воинской части
- Командир 9 ПОП НГУ полковник Олександр Хоменко нагороджений орденом Богдана Хмельницького III ст.
- Начальник Південного ТрУ НГУ перевірив організацію внутрішньої служби військових частин 3026, 3029, 3033
- У центрі Запоріжжя нацгвардійці на бронетранспортері зазивали людей в армію (фото)
- У військовій частині 3042 пройшли тактико-спеціальні навчання
- Розпочався табірний збір артилерійських підрозділів військової частини 3029 НГУ
- Почесні найменування присвоєно 27 бригаді та 9 полку НГУ
