= Ristić =

Ristić (Serbian: Ристић) is a Serbian surname, a patronymic derived from Rista. Notable people with the surname include:

- Aleksandar Ristić (born 1944), Bosnian football manager
- Bratislav Ristić (born 1980), Serbian footballer
- Dragutin Ristić (born 1964), Croatian footballer
- Jovan Ristić (1831–1899), Serbian statesman
- Ljubomir Ristić (born 1990), Serbian basketball player
- Mihailo Ristić (disambiguation), multiple people
- Nevena Ristić (born 1990), Serbian actress
- Sreto Ristić (born 1976), Serbian footballer
- Stevica Ristić (born 1982), Macedonian footballer
- Svetlanka Ristic, fictional character in the Australian soap opera Neighbours
