= Kara Dag Mountain =

Mountain (volcanic rock formation) in Crimea, Ukraine

Coordinates: 44.9314°N 35.2228°E

Karadag
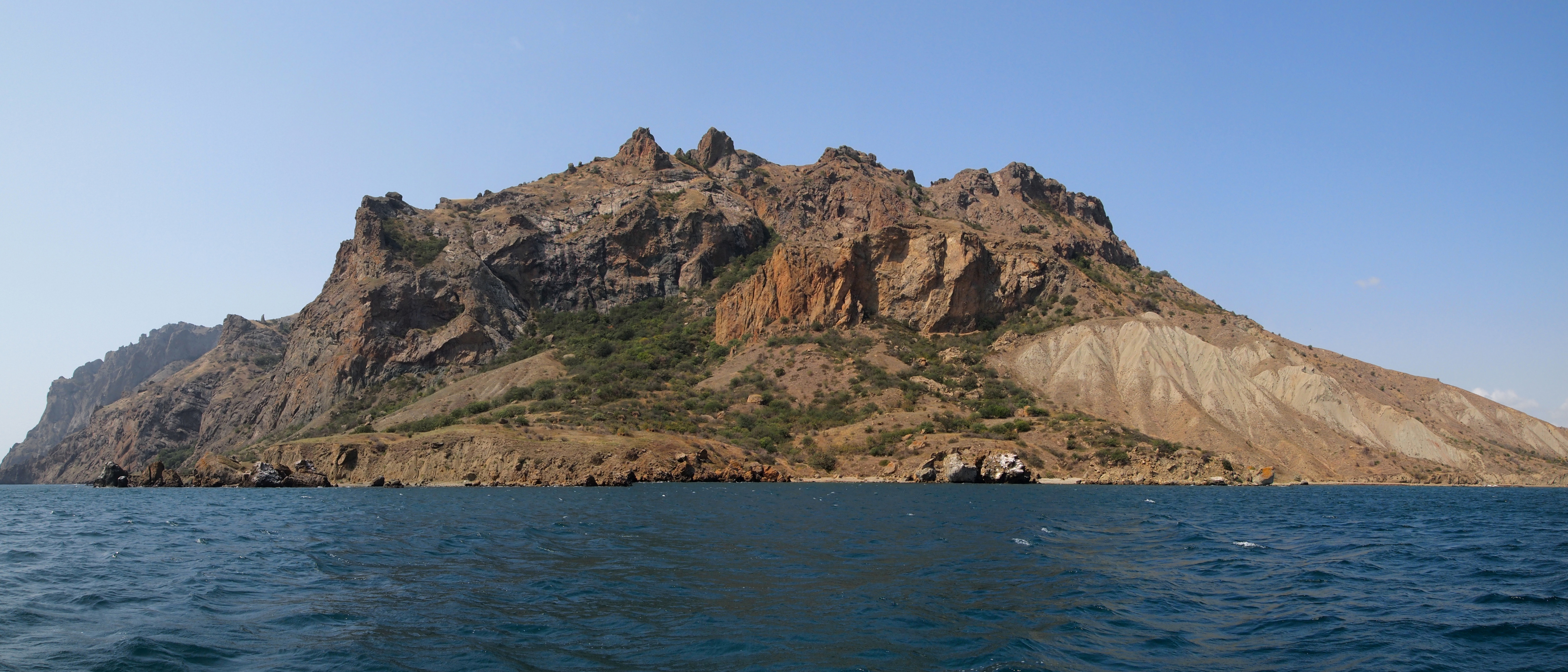

Highest point
- Elevation: 577 m (1,893 ft)

Naming
- Native name: Qaradağ, Qara dağ (Crimean Tatar); Карадаг, Кара-Даг (Ukrainian)

Geography
- Location within Crimea
- Location: Crimea, Ukraine
- Parent range: Crimean Mountains

Geology
- Rock age: 172.8 ± 4.5 Ma

The Karadag (Crimean Tatar: Qaradağ, Qara dağ; Ukrainian: Карадаг, Кара-Даг, lit. 'Black Mount') is a volcanic rock formation which rises to a height of 577 meters between the Crimean coastal town of Köktöbel and the Otuz river valley. It has been the site of a marine biological station since the early 20th century. Some 2874 ha of coastline and 809 ha of coastal waters have been protected as the Karadag Nature Reserve since 1979. The littoral is rich in picturesque cliffs such as the Devil's Gate. The best views of the Karadag are from Köktöbel and Kurortne. 15th Operational Brigade has received the honorary name in relation to the Mountain.

== Gallery ==
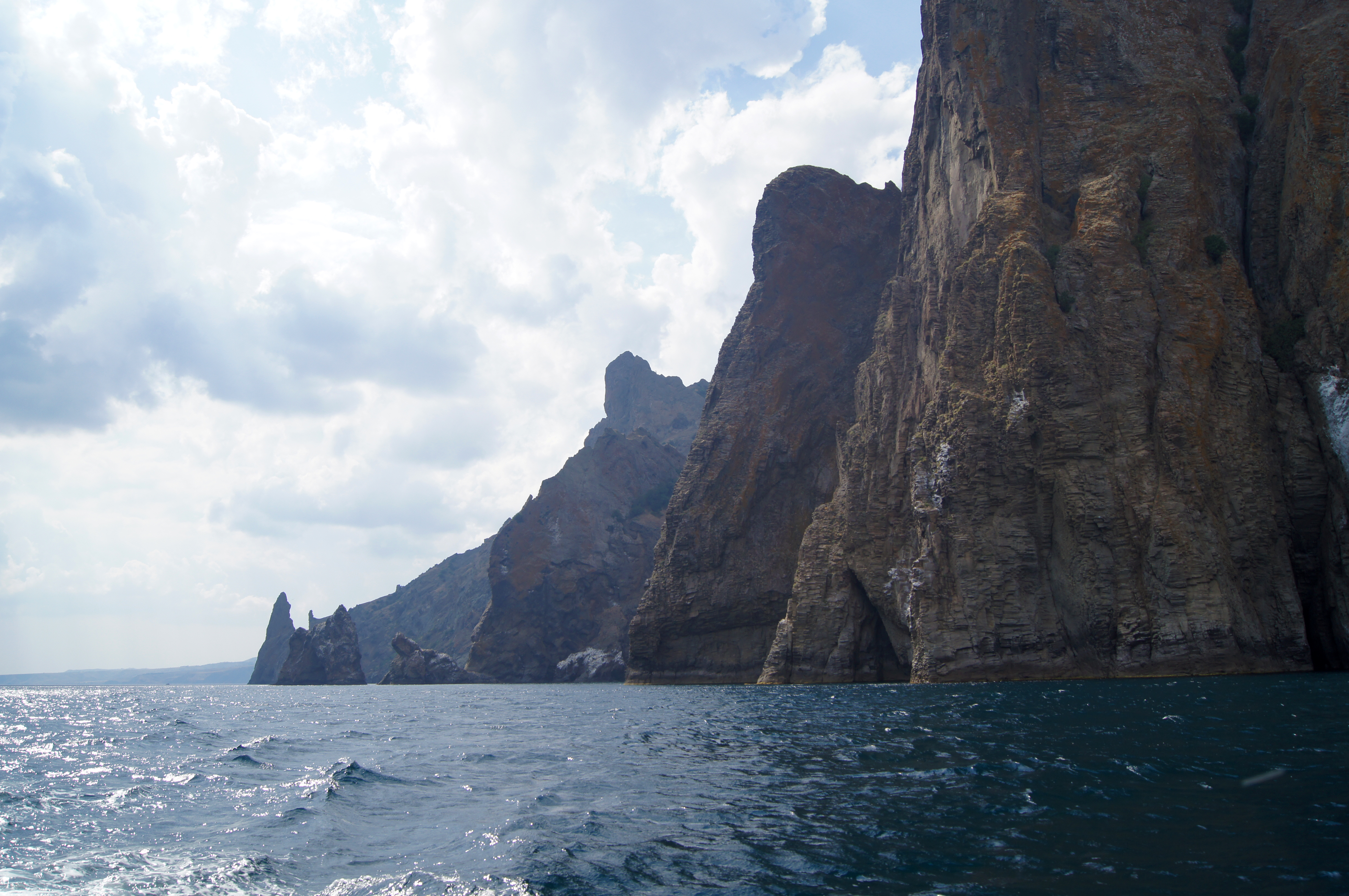
Karadag cliffs

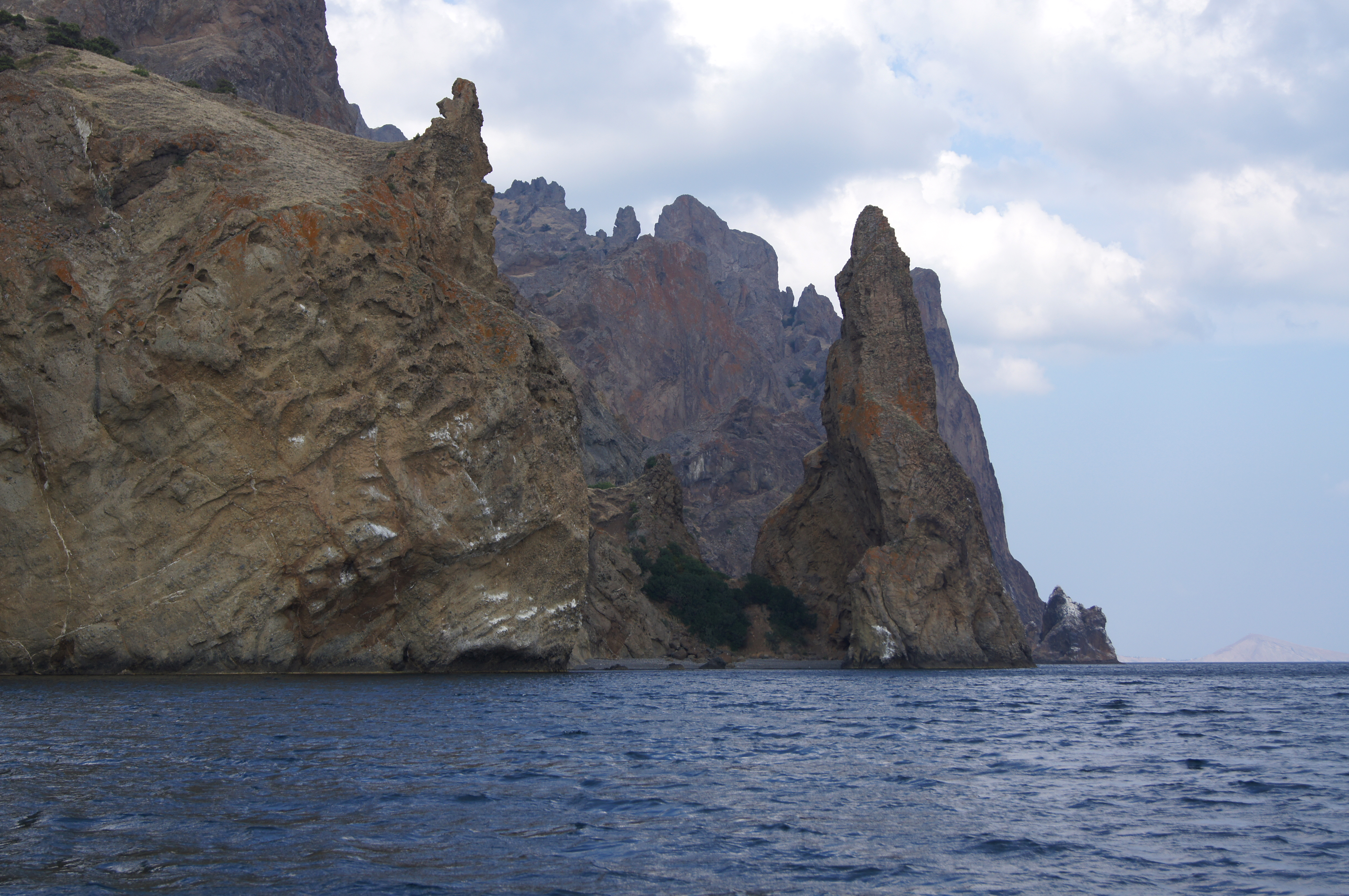
Karadag coastline

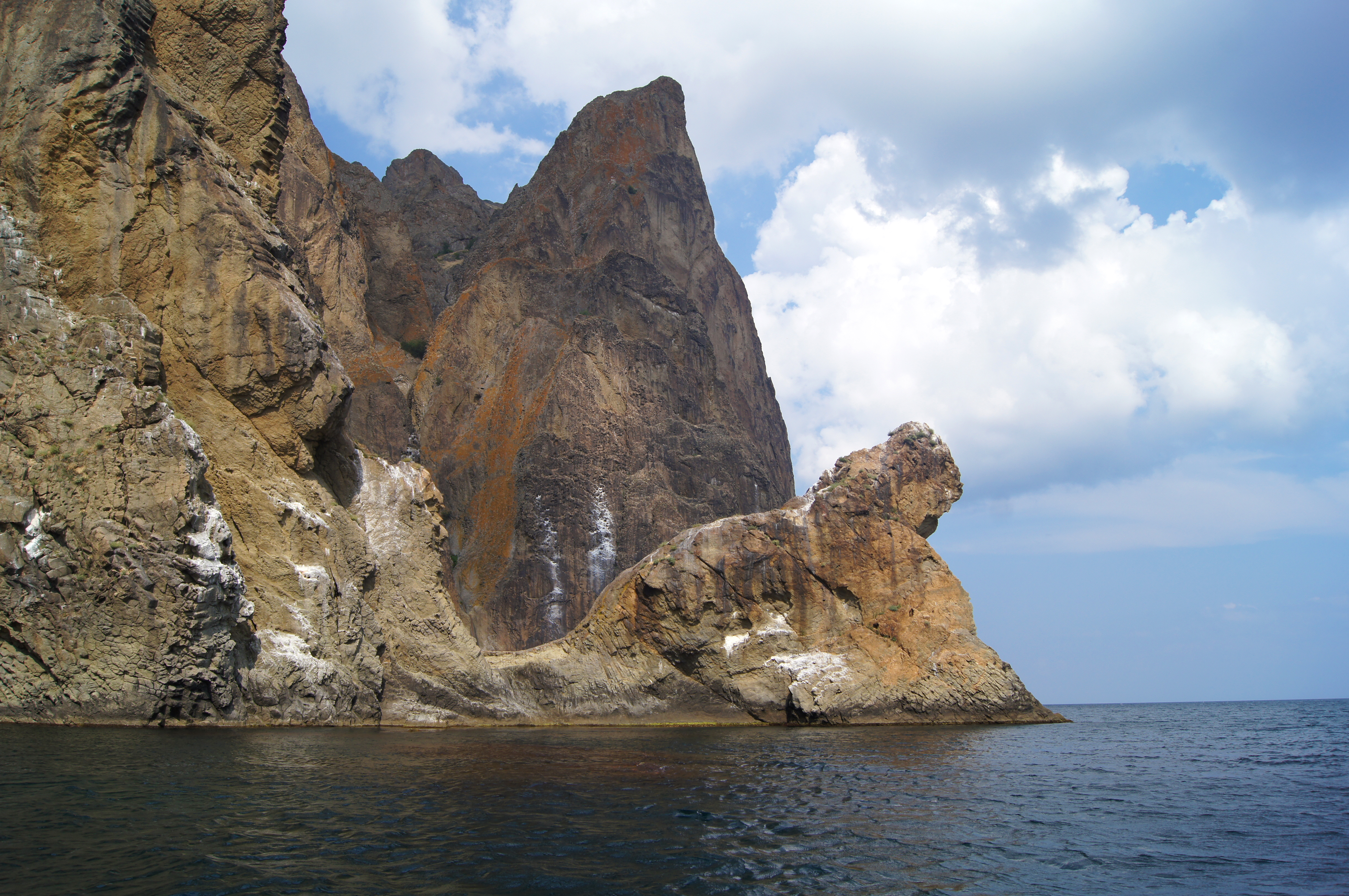
Karadag cliffs by the sea

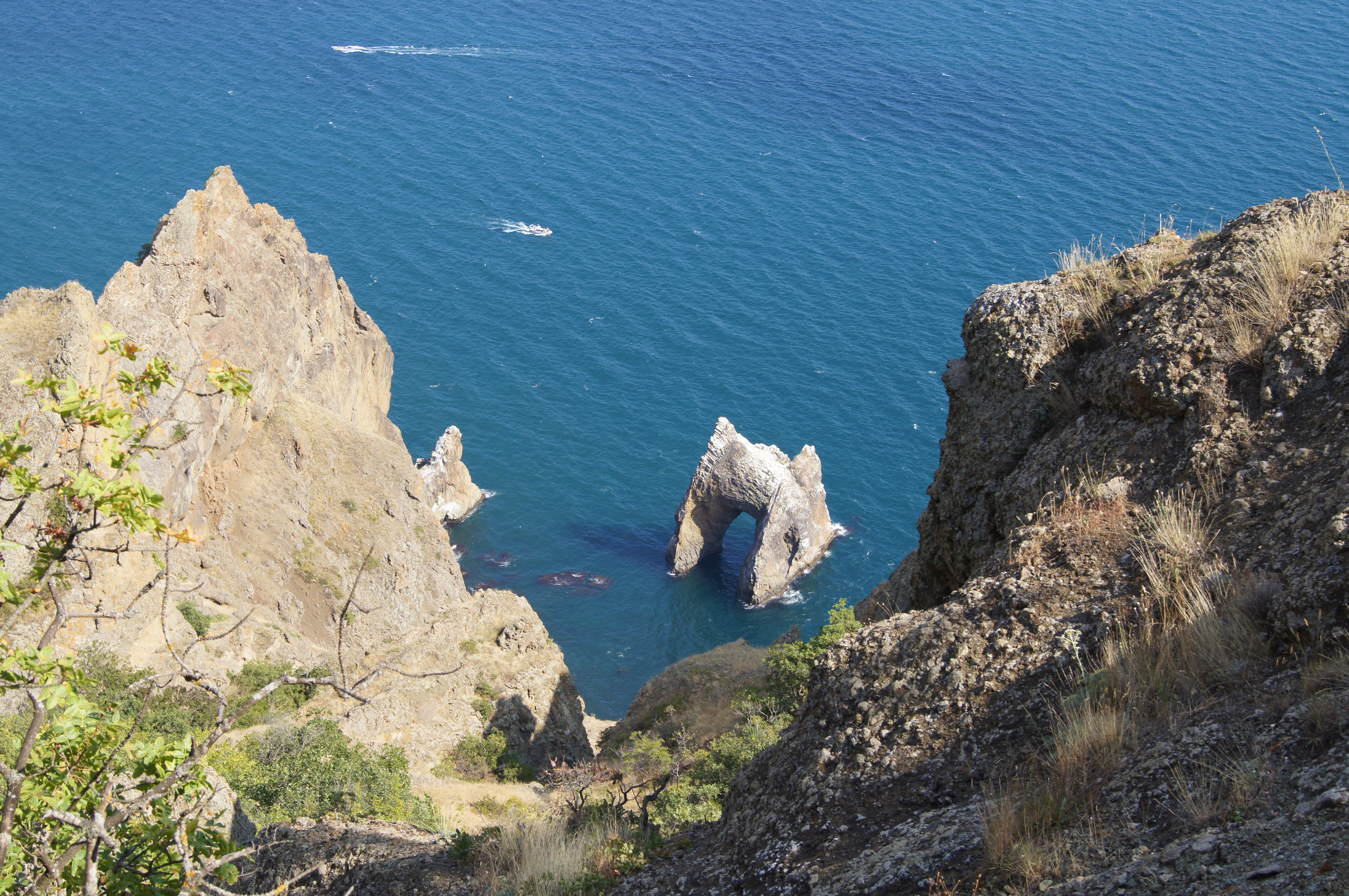
View from the top with Devil's Gate in view

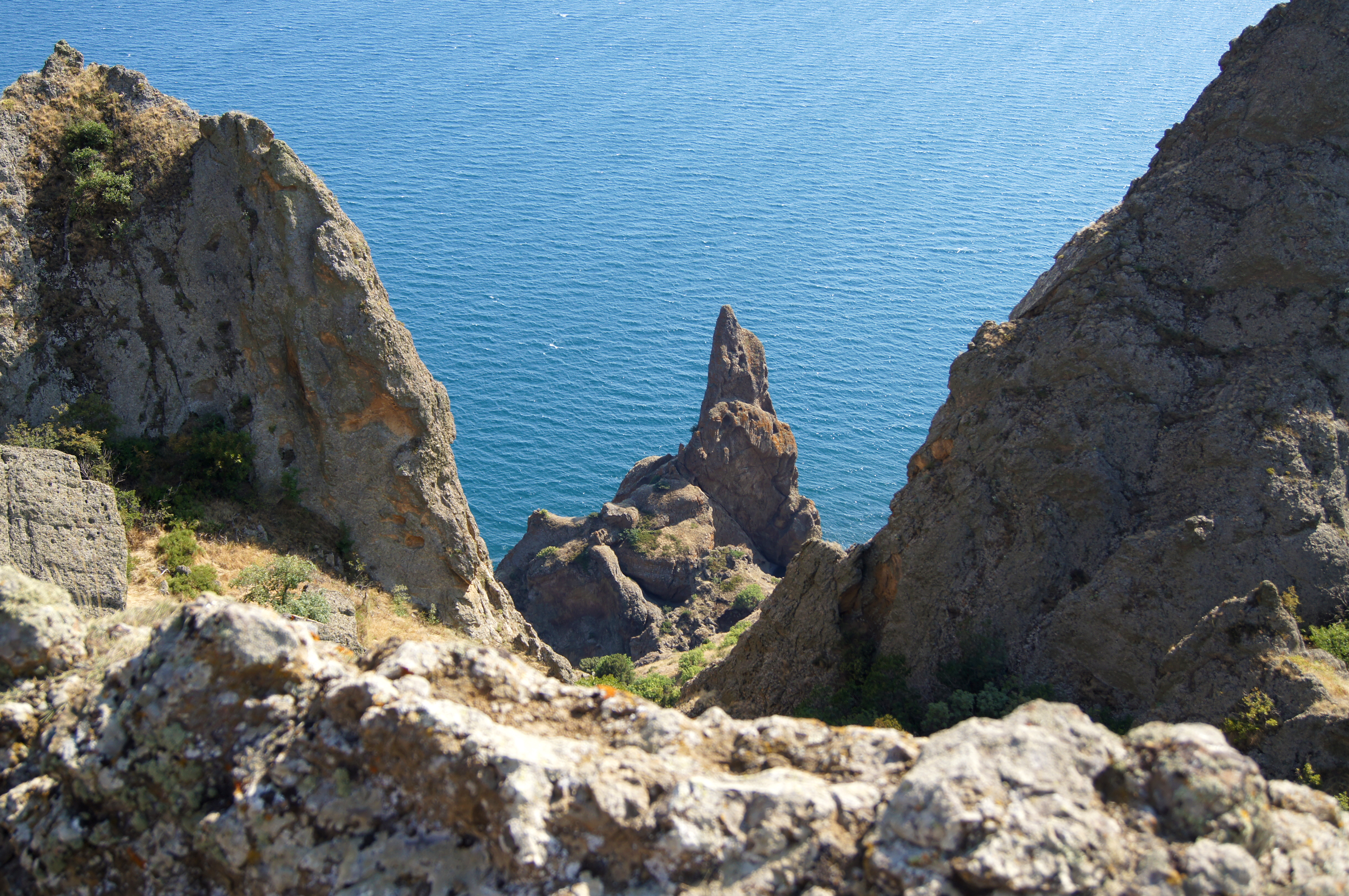
View from the top

== See also ==
- Crimean Mountains
- Chatyr-Dag
