= Macedonski (surname) =

Macedonski (rarely spelled Macedonschi or Macedonsky) is a toponymic surname, derived from Macedonia. It may refer to:

- Alexandru Macedonski, Romanian writer
- Dimitrie Macedonski, Wallachian revolutionary leader
- Hristo Makedonski, Bulgarian revolutionary leader
