= Rista (given name) =

- Gender: Masculine
- Language: Serbian

Origin
- Language: Ancient Greek
- Origin: Χριστός
- Meaning: 'the anointed one'
- Region of origin: Balkans

Other names
- Variant form: Risto
- Derivative: Ristić (surname)
- Related names: Hristo, Hristofor

Rista (Serbian: Риста) is a Serbian masculine given name, derived from Greek Christos. It may refer to:

- Rista Cvetković-Božinče (1845–1878), Serbian agent
- Rista Kostadinović (d. 1881), Serbian guerrilla commander
- Rista Marjanović (1885–1969), Serbian photographer
- Rista Ognjanović (1870–1941), Serbian educator
- Rista Starački (1870–1940), Serbian Chetnik guerrilla commander
- Rista Vukanović (1873–1918), Serbian painter
