= Omerta 6/12 =

2021 Finnish action thriller film

- International film poster
- Directed by: Aku Louhimies
- Screenplay by: Jari Olavi Rantala; Antti Jokinen; Mika Karttunen
- Based on: 6/12 by Ilkka Remes
- Produced by: Mikko Tenhunen; Antti Jokinen; Evelin Penttilä; Sirkka Rautiainen
- Starring: Jasper Pääkkönen; Nanna Blondell; Sverrir Gudnason; Cathy Belton
- Cinematography: Mika Orasmaa
- Edited by: Ben Mercer
- Music by: Lasse Enersen
- Production company: Cinematic
- Distributed by: SF Studios
- Release date: 19 November 2021
- Running time: 115 minutes
- Country: Finland
- Languages: Finnish; English; Swedish; Serbian; Russian; French
- Budget: $9–10 million
- Box office: $958,440

Omerta 6/12 (released in the US as Attack on Finland) is a 2021 Finnish action thriller film directed by Aku Louhimies, based on Ilkka Remes' 2006 novel, 6/12. It tells the story of an attack planned by Serbian terrorists on the presidential palace in Helsinki during the reception for Finland's Independence Day. The film was originally to be directed by Antti J. Jokinen, but having fallen ill, Jokinen was replaced by Louhimies. Omerta stars Jasper Pääkkönen as the main character, with a supporting cast of Nanna Blondell, Sverrir Gudnason, Cathy Belton, Juhan Ulfsak, Dragomir Mrsic, Slaven Spanovic, Märt and Priit Pius, and Mirtel Pohla.

== Synopsis ==
The reception for Finland's Independence Day in the capital city, Helsinki, is rudely interrupted when the presidential palace is attacked by Serbian terrorists, and the state leadership, including President Koskivuo, is taken hostage. Max Tanner of the Security Police is appointed as a negotiator in the hostage crisis that unfolds as part of a larger plan to undermine European security. Tanner must make bold and painful decisions to protect lives and the future of Europe.

== Cast ==
- Jasper Pääkkönen as Max Tanner
- Nanna Blondell as Sylvia Madsen
- Sverrir Gudnason as Vasa Jankovic
- Cathy Belton as Marie LeClair
- Nika Savolainen as Anya
- Pertti Sveholm as Peter Nylund
- Juhan Ulfsak as Leonid Titov
- Zijad Gracic as Jean Morel
- Miodrag Stojanovic as Borislav Jankovic
- Dragomir Mrsic as Zlatko
- Slaven Spanovic as Toma
- Märt Pius as Slobodan
- Priit Pius as Stanko
- Michael Yare as Jonesy
- Andrei Alén as Sinclair
- Robert Enckell as President Koskivuo
- Gaila Järvsalu as Mrs. Koskivuo
- Mirtel Pohla as Raisa

== Production ==
The film's production went through numerous issues, one being safety problems that led to then-director Jokinen not being allowed into the filming area. After Louhimies replaced Jokinen, the script was completely rewritten. The film was planned to be the first part of a series consisting of two films and a six-part TV series. Due to the troublesome production, however, the sequel was abandoned, and the series was reduced to four episodes.

== Release ==
The film had its international premiere on 19 November 2021. It was theatrically released in North America and on VOD by Samuel Goldwyn Films on 1 July 2022.

== Reception ==
=== Box office ===
Omerta 6/12 grossed $0 in North America and a worldwide total of $958,440.

=== Critical response ===
On review aggregator Rotten Tomatoes, the film holds an approval rating of 46% based on 13 reviews, with an average rating of 4.8/10. Metacritic, which uses a weighted average, assigned the film a score of 41 out of 100, based on 4 critics, indicating "mixed or average" reviews.
