= Vatre ivanjske =

- Genre: Telenovela; Romance; Drama
- Created by: Diana Pečkaj Vuković
- Starring: Nevena Ristić; Slaven Španović; Doris Pinčić; Filip Juričić; Ornela Vištica; Ksenija Pajić; Linda Begonja; Aleksandar Cvjetković
- Country of origin: Croatia
- Original language: Croatian
- No. of episodes: 140

Production
- Production location: Zagreb, Croatia
- Production company: RTL Televizija

Original release
- Network: RTL Televizija
- Release: August 25, 2014 – May 15, 2015

Vatre ivanjske (Midsummer Fires) is a Croatian telenovela produced by RTL Televizija. It is an original story, produced in 2014, and starring Nevena Ristić, Slaven Španović and Ksenija Pajić.

== Cast ==
Actor	Character
Nevena Ristić	Ana Kolar
Slaven Španović	Viktor Magdić
Ornela Vištica	Klara Župan †
Filip Juričić	Andrija Turina
Ksenija Pajić	Elena Župan Magdić
Aleksandar Cvjetković	Petar Kolar
Frane Perišin	Božo Magdić †
Linda Begonja	Dinka Vidan
Doris Pinčić Rogoznica	Magdalena Magdić
Lela Margitić	Tilda Kolar †
Ana Begić	Vera Lepen
Iva Mihalić	Tamara Lovrec
Barbara Nola	Marija Turina
Alen Liverić	Patrik Vidan
Marko Cindrić	Luka Župan
Jan Kerekeš	Tomo Magdić
Ema Ursula Stojković	Mia Magdić
Amar Bukvić	Leon †
