= Slaven Španović =

Croatian actor

- Born: 23 August 1988 (age 36); Sremska Mitrovica, SR Serbia, SFR Yugoslavia
- Occupation: Actor
- Years active: 2009–present
- Spouse: Gabriela Španović (m. 2019)

Slaven Španović (born 23 August 1988) is a Croatian actor.

== Filmography ==
=== Television roles ===
Film
Year	Title	Role	Notes
2009	Mamutica	Tiho	Guest star
2013	Počivali u miru	Mišo Šeper	Guest star
2014	Zora dubrovačka	Filip Vilim	Guest star
2014–2015	Vatre ivanjske	Viktor Magdić	Protagonist
2015	Crno bijeli svijet	Šuki	Guest star

=== Movie roles ===
Film
Year	Title	Role	Notes
2009	Zagrebačke priče	/	
2006	BloodRayne: The Third Reich	German Soldier	
2011	Blubberella	German Soldier	
2014	Broj 55	Marko	
2014	Takva su pravila	/	
2015	A Perfect Day	/	
2021	Omerta 6/12	Toma	Post-production
