= Ilkka Remes =

Finnish author (born 1962)

Petri Pykälä (born 13 December 1962), commonly known by his pseudonym Ilkka Remes, is a Finnish author of thrillers for adults and for young adults. Remes was born in Luumäki. He has stated he uses a pseudonym because he does not want to be considered only a thriller writer, and wants to be able to write other genres of books in the future.

Remes lives in Belgium with his wife and two children. He received the Kalevi Jäntti Literature Award in 1997, the Clue of the Year Award from the Finnish Detective Novel Society in 1999 and the Olvi Foundation Literature Award in 1999.

The Finnish Minister for Foreign Affairs Erkki Tuomioja commented on Remes' book Ruttokellot on his homepage in January 2001. His review on the book was rather negative and he found it troubling that so many of the antagonists in Remes' books were of Russian origin. (see Russophobia).

== Adult literature ==
Remes has written 29 thrillers which have enjoyed significant domestic popularity. The names in parentheses are direct translations.

- Pääkallokehrääjä (1997) ("Death's-head Moth")
- Karjalan lunnaat (1998) ("Ransom of Karelia")
- Pedon syleily (1999) ("The Beast's Embrace")
- Ruttokellot (2000) ("The Plague Bells")
- Uhrilento (2001) ("The Sacrificial Flight")
- Itäveri (2002) ("Eastern Blood")
- Ikiyö (2003) ("The Perpetual Night")
- Hiroshiman portti (2004) ("The Gate of Hiroshima")
- Nimessä ja veressä (2005) ("In the Name and Blood")
- 6/12 (2006) (referring to 6 December, the Independence Day of Finland)
- Pahan perimä ("The Genes of Evil") (2007)
- Pyörre ("Vortex") (2008)
- Isku Ytimeen ("A Strike to the Core") (2009)
- Shokkiaalto ("Shockwave") (2010)
- Teräsleijona ("Steel Lion") (2011)
- Ylösnousemus ("Resurrection") (2012)
- Omertan liitto ("The Union of Omerta") (2013)
- Horna ("Inferno") (2014)
- Jäätyvä Helvetti ("Freezing Hell")(2015)
- Kiirastuli ("Purgatory") (2016)
- Vapauden risti ("The Cross of Freedom") (2017)
- Perikato ("Destruction") (2018)
- Kremlin Nyrkki ("The Fist of Kremlin") (2019)
- Kotkanpesä ("The Eagle's Nest") (2020)
- Lohikäärmeen isku ("The Strike of a Dragon") (2021)
- Tornado (2022)
- Pimeyden sydän ("Heart of Darkness") (2023)
- Zeus (2024)
- Punarutto ("The Red Plague") (2025)
- Kaaos ("Chaos") (2026)

Of the above, Ruttokellot ("Blutglocke"), Ikiyö ("Ewige Nacht"), Hiroshiman portti ("Das Hiroshima-Tor"), Nimessä ja veressä ("Höllensturz"), 6/12 ("Die Geiseln") and Pahan perimä, ("Das Erbe des Bösen") have been translated into German.

== Young adult literature ==
Remes has written eight thrillers for young adults, some of which has been translated to English.

- Piraatit (2003) ("Pirates", released as "Operation Ocean Emerald")
- Musta Kobra (2004) ("Black Cobra", released as "Operation Black Cobra")
- Pimeän pyöveli (2005) ("Executioner of Darkness")
- Kirottu koodi (2006) ("Cursed Code", released as "Operation Code Breaker")
- Hermes (2007)
- Draculan Ratsu (2008) ("Dracula's Steed")
- Operaatio Solaris (2009) ("Operation Solaris")
- Riskiraja (2010) ("Risk Limit")

== See also ==
- Omerta 6/12
