= Devil's Gate (Crimea) =

Coordinates: 44°54′51″N 35°14′5″E

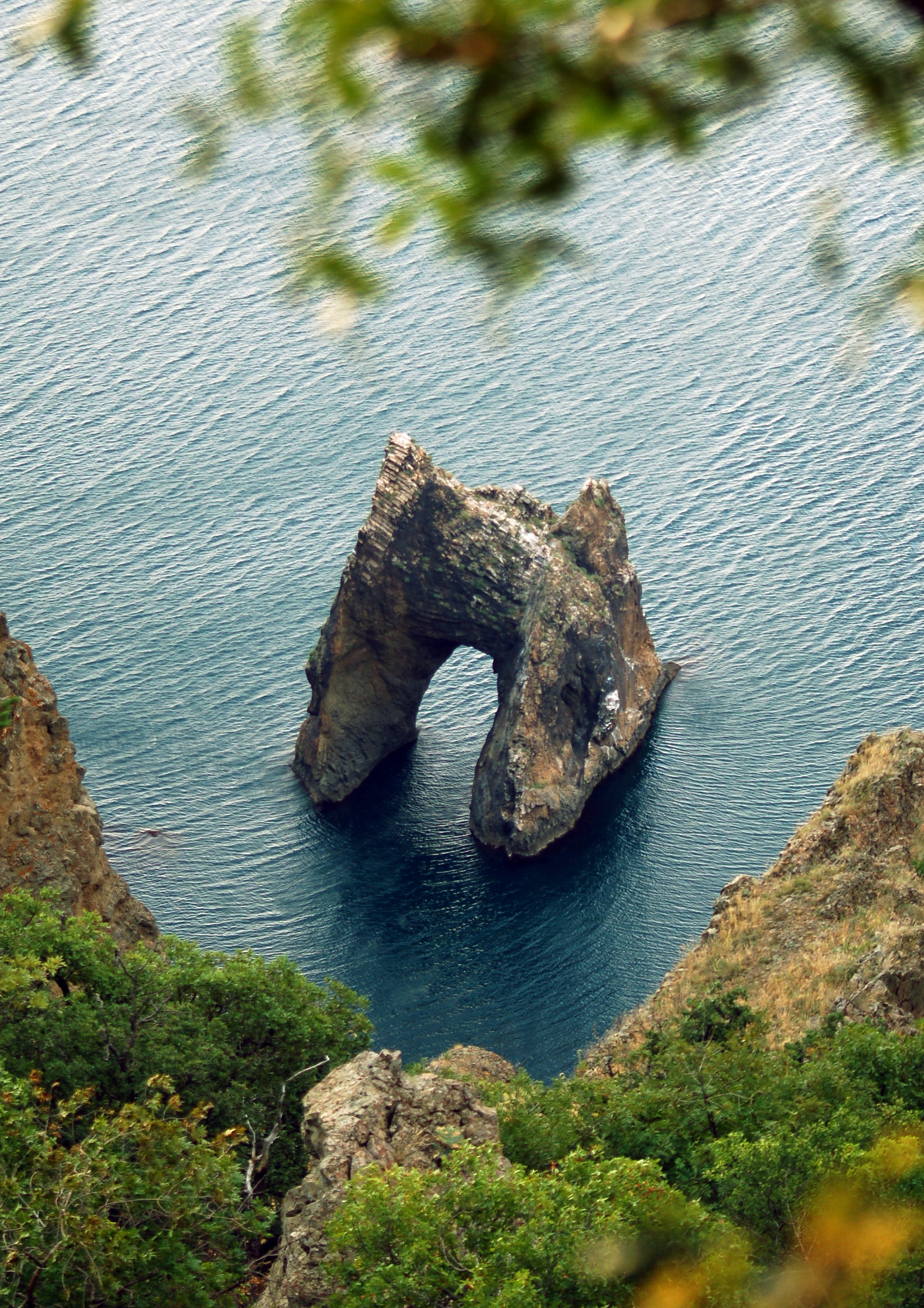
View from the Kara Dag

The Devil's Gate (Crimean Tatar: şeytan qapu) or Golden Gate (Altın Qapı) is an arch-like cliff near the Kara Dag Mountain in the Crimea. The cliff was supposed to have marked a gateway to hell. It is popular with tourists and carnelian hunters. Alexander Pushkin is thought to have been the first to depict the cliff, on the margins of his verse novel Eugene Onegin.

== See also ==
- Sail Rock
