= Alexander Baykov =

Russian metallurgist (1870–1946)

- Александр Байков
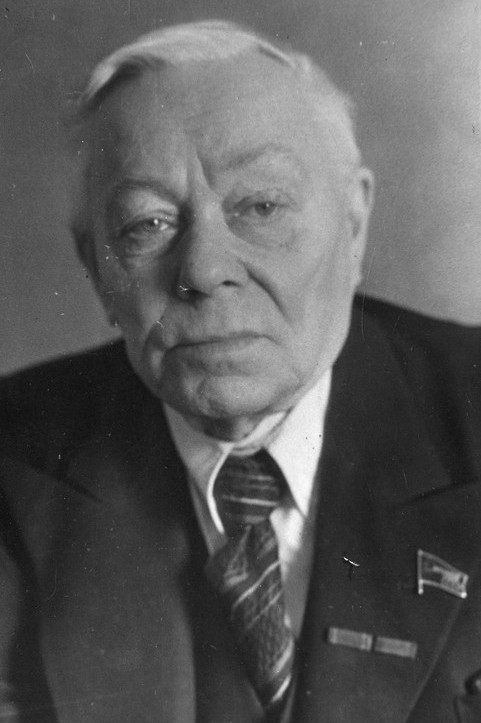
- Baykov in 1945
- Born: August 6, 1870; Fatezh, Kursk Oblast
- Died: April 6, 1946 (aged 75); Moscow, USSR
- Education: Saint Petersburg Imperial University
- Scientific career
- Fields: Chemistry, metallurgy

Signature
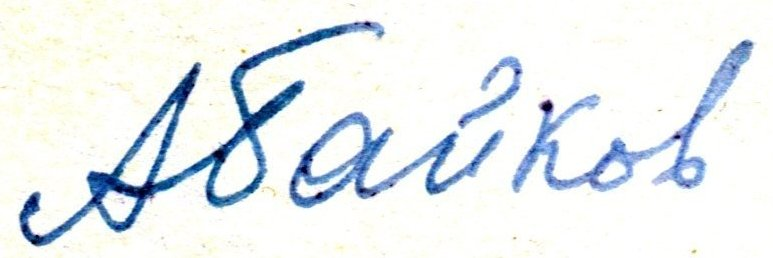

Alexander Alexandrovich Baykov (Russian: Александр Александрович Байков; August 6, 1870 – April 6, 1946) was a Soviet university professor, scientist specializing in the fields of metallurgy and chemistry and an academician of the USSR Academy of Sciences.

== Early life and education ==
Baykov was born on August 6, 1870, in the city of Fatezh of the Russian Empire. In 1889 he graduated from the Classical Gymnasium in Kursk and entered the Faculty of Physics and Mathematics in St. Petersburg University. He was left to work at the university at the Department of Physical Chemistry in 1894 and was appointed laboratory assistant in chemistry as assistant to DP Konovalov.

In 1895, he transferred to the Institute of Railway Engineers to the position of head of the chemical laboratory. In 1899, the board of the Institute of Communication was sent on a business trip to France, where he studied physical chemistry in the laboratory of Henri Louis Le Chatelier and crystallography and mineralogy in the laboratory of Grigory Vyrubov. After returning from France in late 1903, he authored his dissertation on "Study of copper and antimony alloys and the hardening phenomena observed in them."

== Career ==
In 1907-1916 he taught chemistry at the Bestuzhev Courses and in 1911-1917 he lectured at the courses of P. F. Lesgaft.

In the summer of 1918, in connection with the work on the study of the Karadag routes, he was in the Crimea. The events of the Russian Civil War prevented him from returning to Petrograd and remained in Simferopol until 1923. In October 1918 Baiyov was elected a professor at the Tauride University.

In 1923 he returned to Petrograd and retook his former department and resumed his teaching activities. In the same year, he was elected professor in the Department of Chemistry at Petrograd University, which was previously headed by his teachers, D. I. Mendeleev and D. P. Konovalov.

In 1927-1934 he took part in the compilation of the Technical Encyclopedia edited by Ludwig Martens and authored articles on the topics of chemistry and metallurgy.

In 1938, he was the first head of the science department of the newly created Institute of metallurgy of the USSR Academy of Sciences in Moscow. Subsequently, this institute was named after Alexander Baykov.

He was elected a corresponding member, then a full member presidium, and, finally, the first vice-president of the USSR Academy of Sciences.

== Death ==
Alexander Baykov died on April 6, 1946, and was buried in Moscow at the Novodevichy Cemetery.

== Honors ==
- Order of St. Vladimir 4th degree
- Order of St. Anne 2nd class
- Order of St. Anne 3rd class
- Hero of Socialist Labor (10 June 1945)
- Three Order of Lenin (10 October 1940, 10 June 1945, 5 August 1945)
- Order of the Red Banner of Labor (21 February 1944 and 29 May 1944)
- Stalin Prize 1st class (1943)
