= Karadag Nature Reserve =

Nature reserve in Crimea

- Ukrainian: Карадазький природний заповідник Russian: Карадагский природный заповедник
- IUCN category Ia (strict nature reserve)
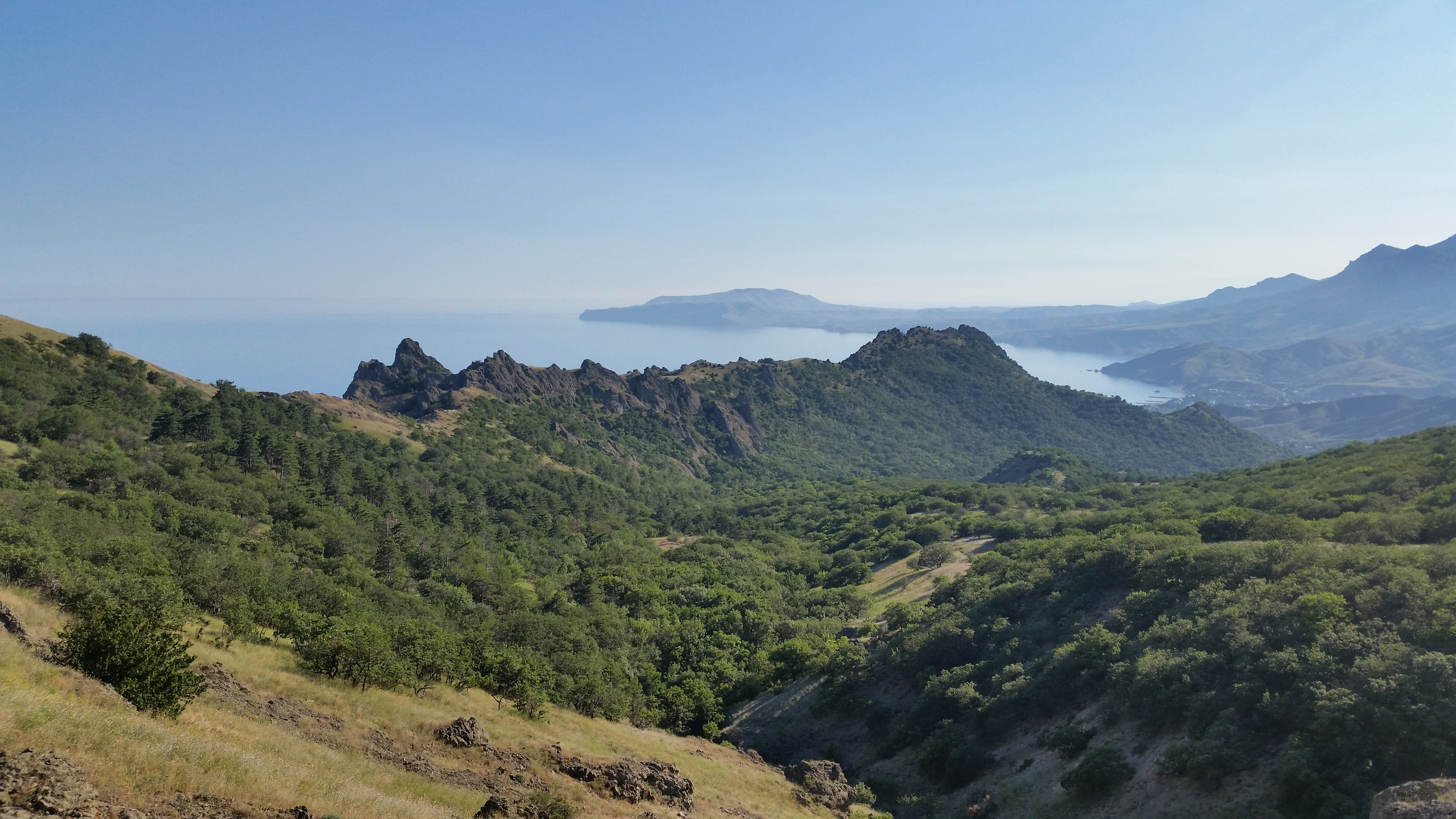
- Karadag Nature Reserve

- Location within Crimea
- Interactive map of Karadag Nature Reserve
- Location: Ukraine (de jure) / Russia (de facto)
- Nearest city: Feodosia
- Coordinates: 44°56′09″N 35°13′59″E
- Area: 2,874 hectares (7,102 acres; 29 km^{2}; 11 sq mi)
- Established: 1979
- Governing body: Ministry of Science and Higher Education / Russian Academy of Sciences
- Website: http://karadag.com.ru/

Ramsar Wetland
- Official name: Aquatic-cliff complex of Karadag
- Designated: 29 July 2004
- Reference no.: 1394

Karadag Nature Reserve (Ukrainian: Карадазький природний заповідник; Russian: Карадагский природный заповедник) is a protected nature reserve that covers a portion of the southeast coast of the Crimean peninsula. Encompassing mountains, forest-steppe, shoreline and marine areas, Karadag is an area of high biodiversity and the subject of much scientific study throughout the past 100 years. It supports a high number of Crimea's endemic species, and important bird colonies. The reserve is 36 km southwest of the city of Feodosia, and is currently administered by the Russian Academy of Sciences.

== Topography ==
The Karadag Reserve is located in on the southeast coast of the Crimean Peninsula, in the Black Sea, on the eastern tip of the Crimean Mountains. The site is on the Kara Dag Mountain, a volcanic massif that formed in the Jurassic. The southern shores of the mountains slope down to the sea, creating an 8 km shoreline of bays, beaches, and grottoes. 809 hectares of the site covers off-shore marine areas. The marine sector plus the pebble-boulder beach and the coastal cliffs up to 120 meters, are a Ramsar wetland of international importance. The reserve is bracketed by the coastal towns of Koktebel on the north, and Kurortne to the south.

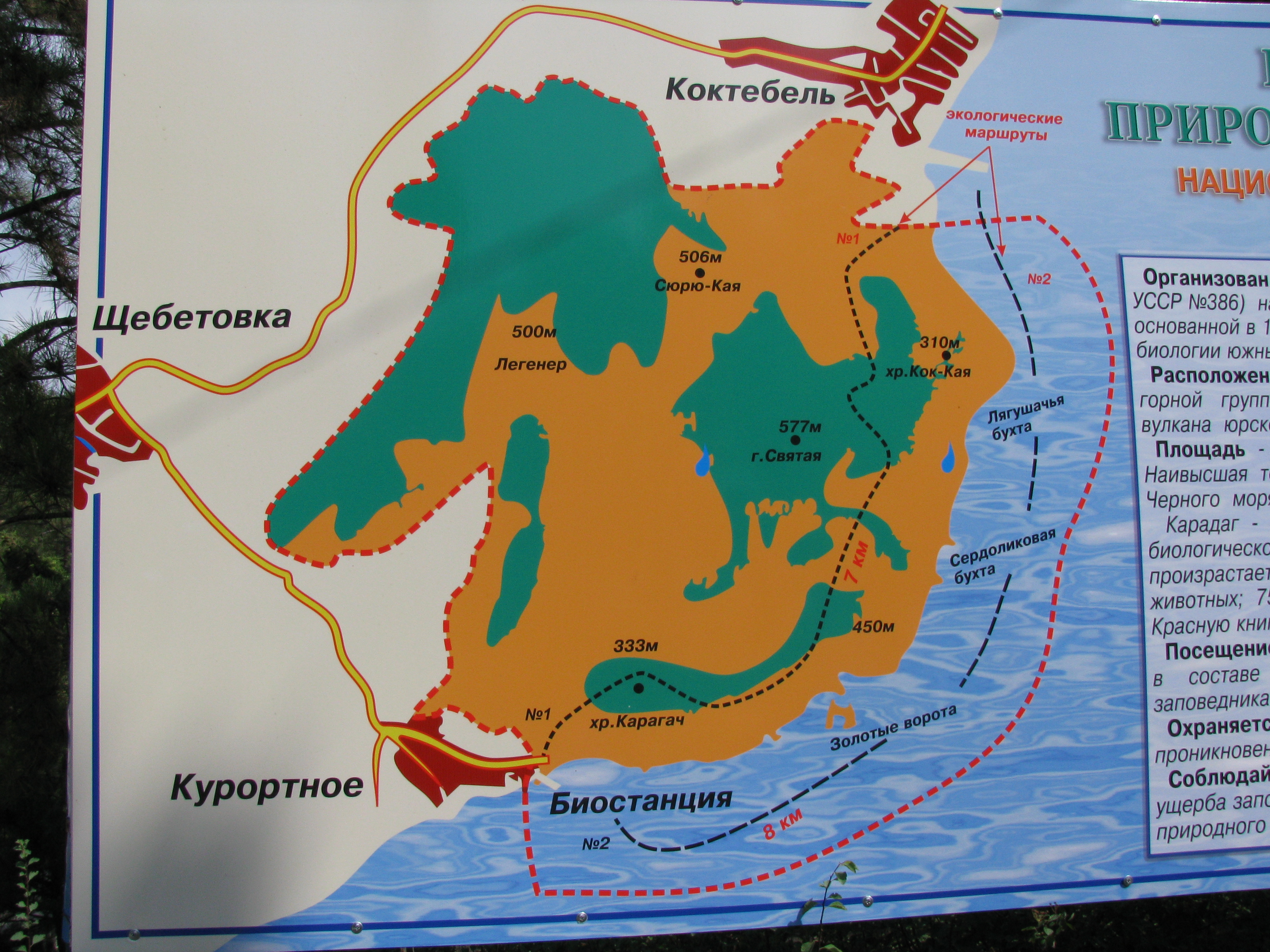
Map posted in the reserve

== Climate and ecoregion ==
The climate of Karadag is humid continental climate - hot summer sub-type (Köppen climate classification Dfa), with large seasonal temperature differentials and a hot summer (at least one month averaging over 22 °C (72 °F)) and mild winters. The average temperature in the reserve in February is 1.5 °C (34.7 °F), and 23.8 °C (74.8 °F) in July. The water temperature varies from 5 °C (41 °F) to 22 °C (72 °F). Annual sunshine averages 2,200-2,300 hours per year, and annual precipitation averages 300 mm.

The reserve is in the western extreme of the Crimean Submediterranean forest complex ecoregion, a small band of territory that stretches from the southern Crimean peninsula to the northern Caucasus Mountains.

== Flora and fauna ==
Because of its variety of habitat and position on both mountain and coast, the area is one of great biodiversity. Over half of the plant and animal species of Crimea are found in the Karadag Reserve, and one third of Crimea's endemic species. 40% of the reserve is forested, mostly with hornbeam, ash, pine and oak. Eight types of feather-grass steppe make up most of the rest. Scientists have recorded 1,154 species of vascular plants, 115 species of fish, 35 of mammals, and 236 species of birds. The area is particularly important for fish-eating birds, including a significant colony of European shag (a type of cormorant) on the cliffs.

== Public use ==
As a strict nature reserve, Kara-Dag's primary purpose is protection of nature and scientific study. Public access is limited: mass recreation and construction of facilities is prohibited as are hunting and fishing. There is an ecological trail (hiking) through the mountainous part of the reserve, recording over 15,000 users per year. In the nearby village of Kurortne the reserve administers an ecological visitors center with wildlife and plant exhibits, and a dolphinarium (aquarium and center for dolphin study). Reserve scientists and staff sponsor educational programs and publications. .

== Gallery ==
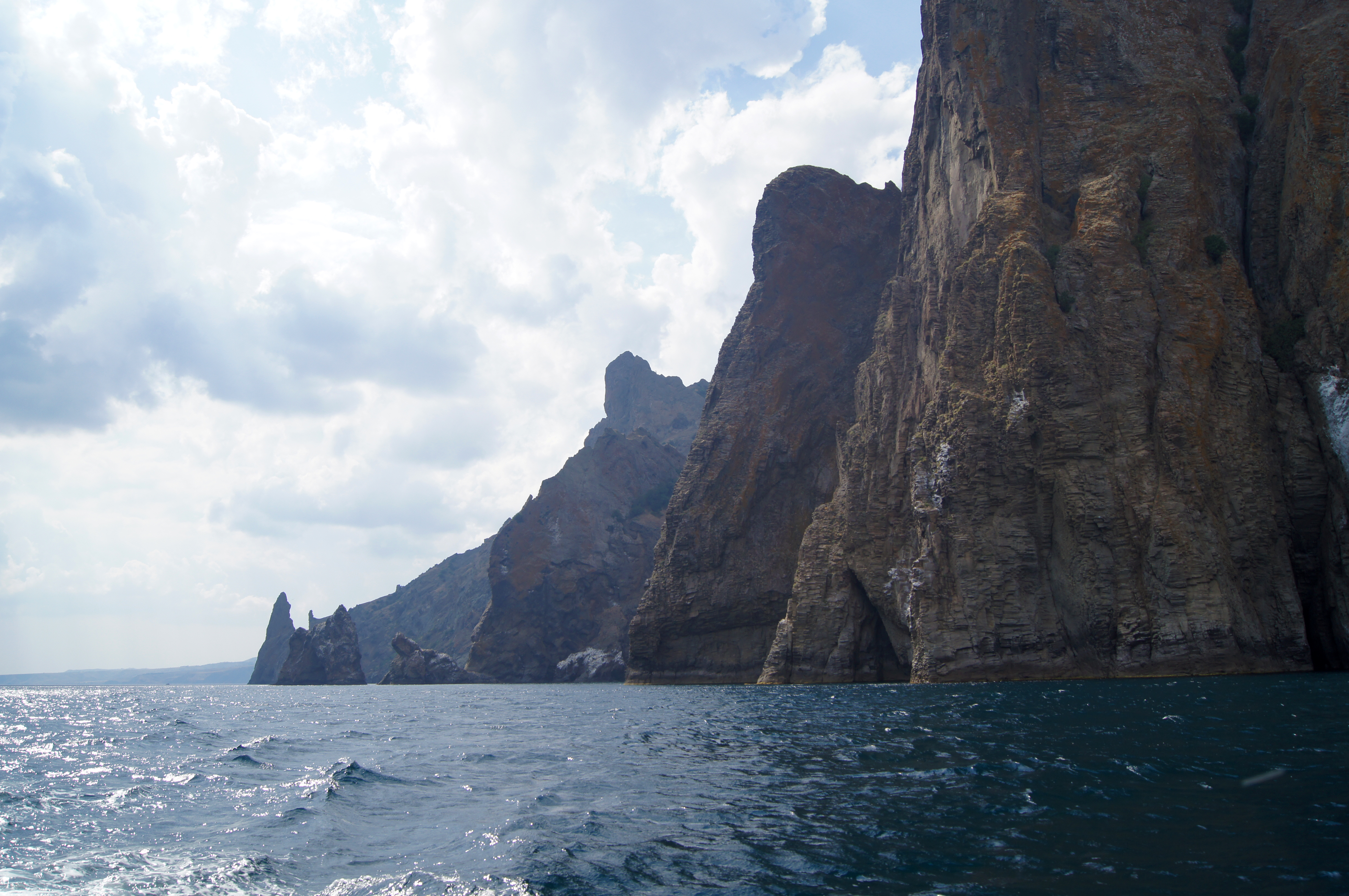
Karadag cliffs

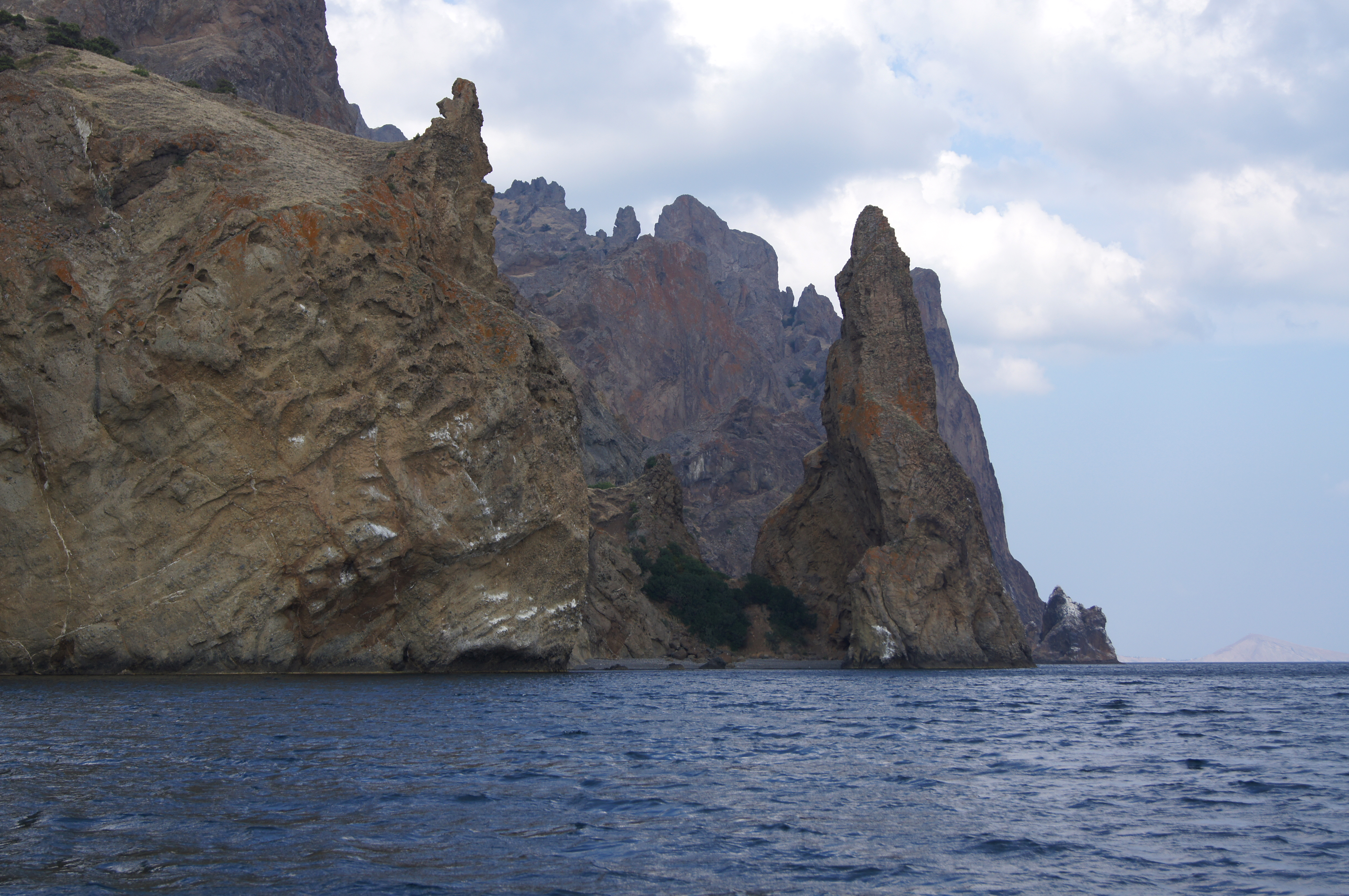
Karadag coastline

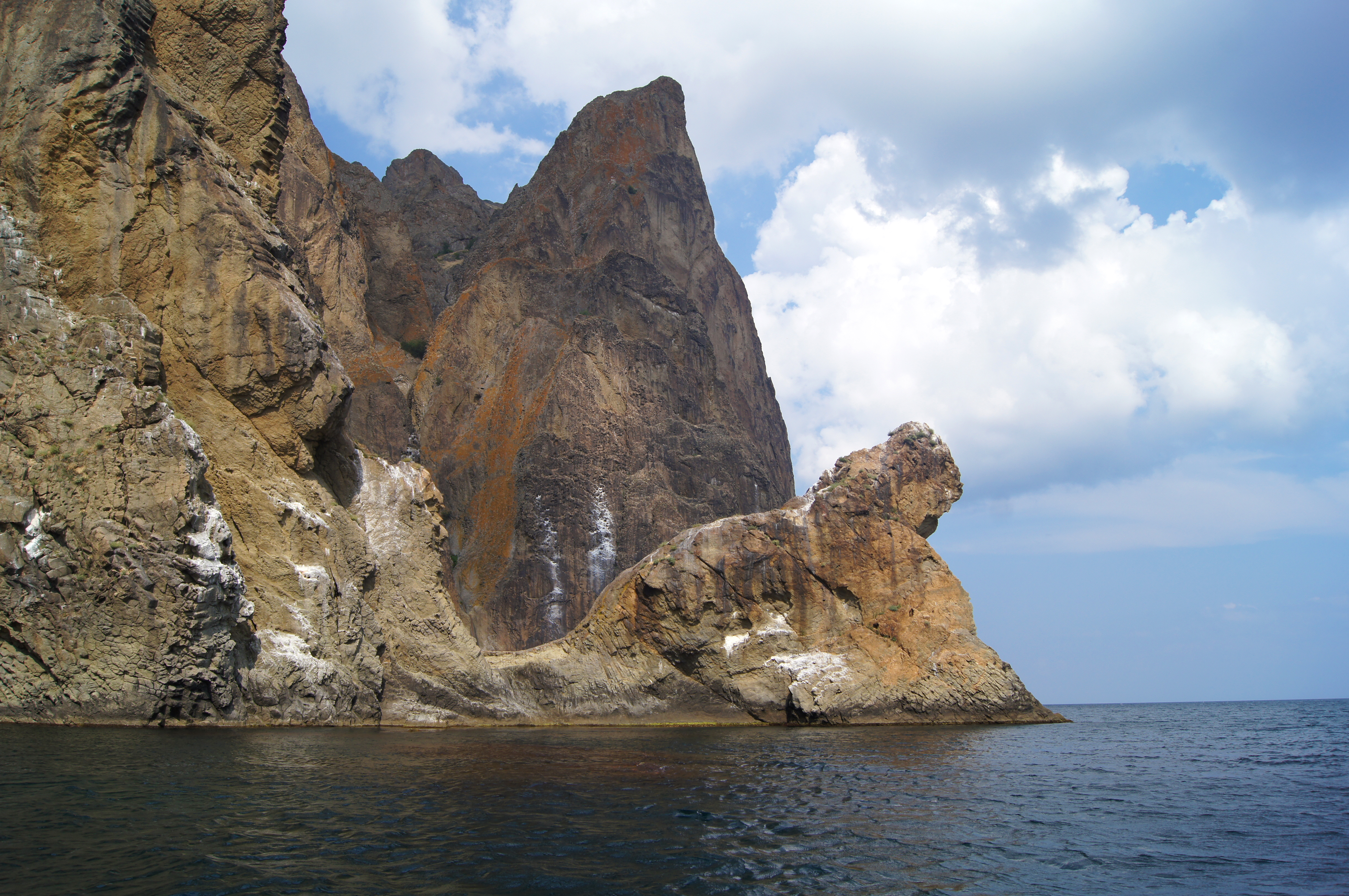
Karadag cliffs by the sea

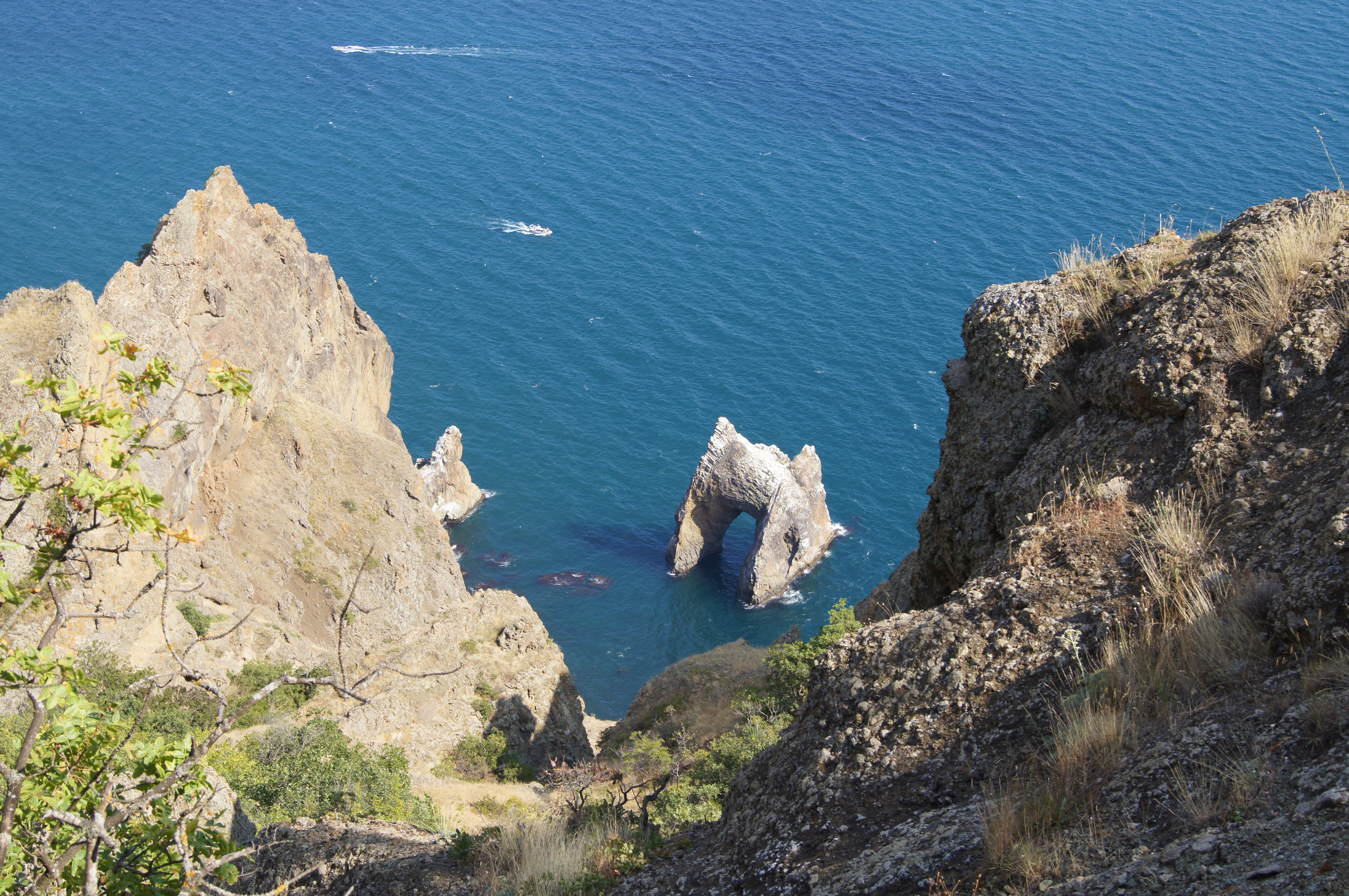
View from the top

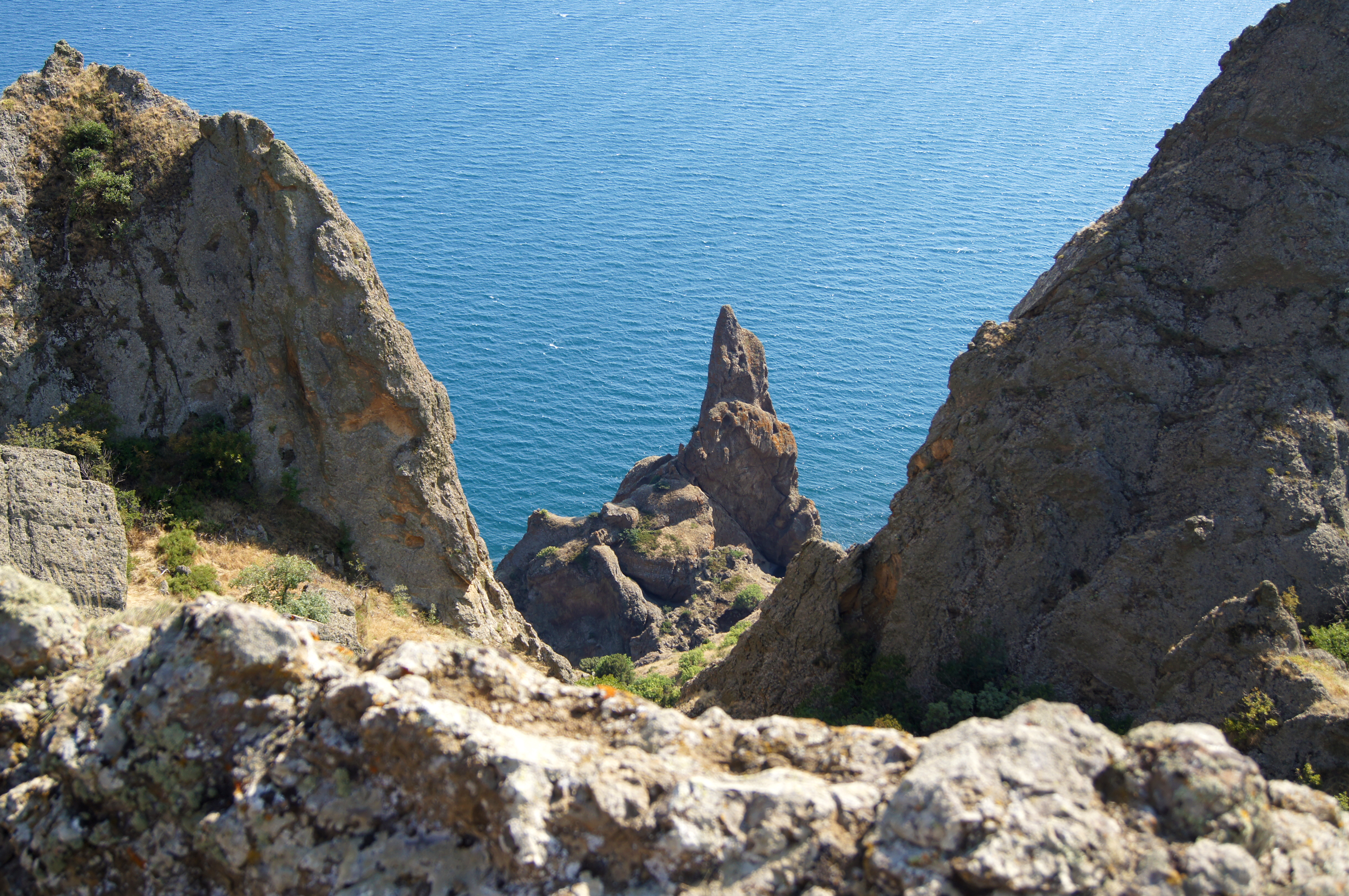
Jurassic cliffs, View from the top

== See also ==
- Lists of Nature Preserves of Ukraine (class Ia protected areas)
- National Parks of Ukraine (class II protected areas)
