= Doris Pinčić =

Croatian actress

- Born: 4 September 1988 (age 37); Zadar, SR Croatia, Yugoslavia
- Other names: Doris Pinčić Rogoznica; Doris Pinčić Guberović
- Occupation: Actress
- Years active: 2011–present
- Known for: Lara Božić-Zlatar in Larin izbor
- Spouses: Boris Rogoznica (m. 2013; div. 2020) Davor Guberović (m. 2022)
- Children: 2

Doris Pinčić Guberović (born 4 September 1988) is a Croatian actress and TV and radio presenter. She is known for her role as Lara Božić-Zlatar in the Nova TV series, Larin izbor.

== Biography ==
She graduated from Academy of acting and puppetry in Osijek. From 2011 to 2013, she was playing the protagonist in the series Larin izbor. Upon completion of the series, in 2013 she became a host at Narodni radio.

=== Personal life ===
On 6 September 2013, she married the musician Boris Rogoznica, and on 11 February 2014, she gave birth to a son Donat. On 27 June 2018, she gave birth to a daughter Gita. The two divorced in 2020.

In November 2022, she married Davor Guberović.

== Filmography ==
=== Television ===
Year	Title	Role	Notes
2011–2013	Larin izbor	Lara Božić-Zlatar	Main role; 344 episodes
2013; 2020; 2022; 2025	Volim Hrvatsku	Herself (contestant)	Game show; 4 episodes
2014–2015	Vatre ivanjske	Magdalena Magdić	Main role; 99 episodes
2014	Budi mi prijatelj	Herself	Charity special
2015	Pet na pet	Herself (contestant)	Game show; Vatre ivanjske special
2015–2019	3, 2, 1 – kuhaj!	Herself (host)	Cooking talent show
2015–2018	Zvjezdice	Herself (host)	Singing talent show
2015	Horvatovi	Violeta Kunić	Supporting role; 16 episodes
2020–2021	Dora	Herself (host)	Eurovision Song Contest selection
2020–present	Dobro jutro, Hrvatska	Herself (host)	Morning talk show
2020	Superpar	Herself (guest)	Reality TV show
2025–2026	Eurovision Song Contest 2025; Eurovision Song Contest 2026	Herself (Croatian spokesperson)	Grand Final

=== Film ===
Film
Year	Title	Role	Notes
2012	Larin izbor: Izgubljeni princ	Lara Božić-Zlatar / Sister Aurora	
2016	Because of You	Lara	
2017	Fuck Off I Love You	Ena	
2018	Happy End: Stupid and Stupider 3	Time traveler	
2022	The Conversation	Marija Horvat	
