= Ornela Vištica =

Herzegovinian Croat actress and model (born 1989)

- Born: 18 September 1989 (age 35); Mostar, SR Bosnia and Herzegovina, SFR Yugoslavia
- Citizenship: Bosnia and Herzegovina; Croatia
- Occupation: Actress
- Years active: 2011–present

Ornela Vištica (born 18 September 1989) is a Bosnian and Herzegovinian actress and model.

== Filmography ==
=== Television roles ===
Film
Year	Title	Role	Notes
2011	Špica	Fani	TV pilot
2011–2013	Larin izbor	Karmen Saga	Co-Protagonist
2014–2015	Vatre ivanjske	Klara Župan	Main antagonist
2015	Žene s Dedinja	Ivona Babić	Guest star
2018–2019	Pogrešan čovek	Aleksandra Vidović	Guest star
