= Stepanivka =

Village in Perevalsk Raion, Luhansk Oblast, Ukraine

Coordinates: 48°27′06″N 38°29′44″E

Stepanivka (Ukrainian: Степанівка), in Ukraine, is a village in Luhansk Oblast, known for being the site of an ancient settlement dating to 5000 - 4300 B.C. belonging to the Cucuteni-Trypillian culture.

The site is near the modern village of Stepanivka, Kadiivka urban hromada, Perevalskyi Raion in Luhansk Oblast. On 28 July 2014, Ukrainian forces reportedly secured this village from pro-Russian separatists. Starting in mid-April 2014, pro-Russian separatists captured several towns in Luhansk Oblast. On 14 August 2014 the Ukrainian military lost control of Stepanivka to the Luhansk People's Republic. According to a soldier of the Ukrainian 8th Army Corps the Luhansk People's Republic were able to do this assisted by armored units of the Russian Armed Forces.

== See also ==
- Cucuteni-Trypillian culture
