= Nevena Vukes =

Serbian actress (born 1990)

- Невена Вукес
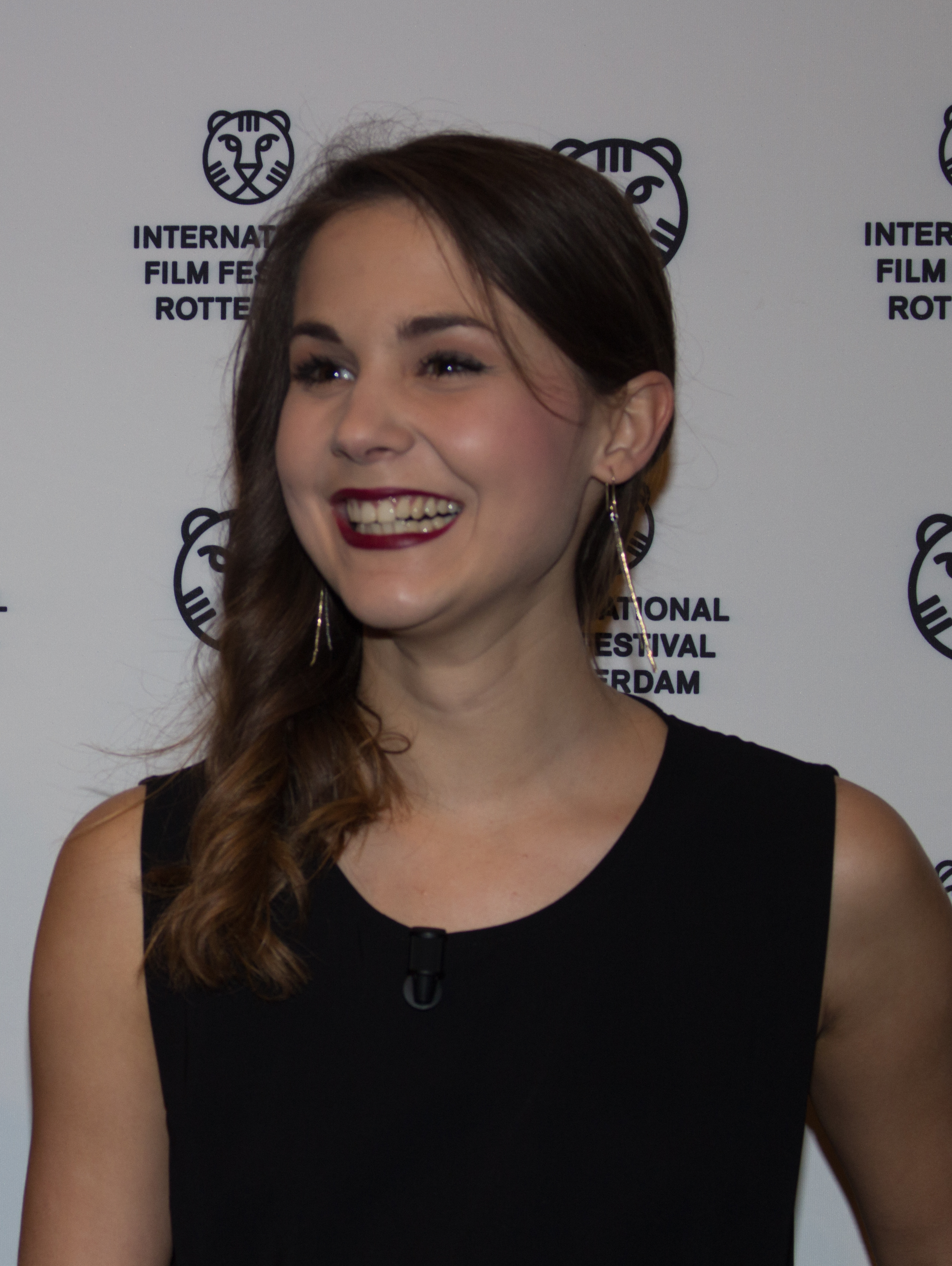
- Nevena Vukes at the premier of The Sky Above Us during the International Film Festival Rotterdam 2015
- Born: Nevena Ristić; 2 June 1990 (age 36); Kragujevac, SR Serbia, SFR Yugoslavia
- Occupation: Actress
- Years active: 2011–present
- Spouse: Marko Vukes (m. 2017)

Nevena Vukes (née Ristić; Serbian Cyrillic: Невена Вукес, née Ристић; born 2 June 1990) is a Serbian actress.

== Biography ==
Nevena Ristić was born on June 2, 1990, in Kragujevac, Serbia. She showed her love for acting as a girl, so she was part of a drama workshop in Kragujevac at the Elementary School, and later at the High School. In addition to acting, she also had interests in scouts and has been a part of the world scout organization since she was 10, with which she visited the beautiful forests and mountains of her country. Nevena often jokes that she spent more sleepless nights under a tent than in hotels.

As a young girl, during high school, she actively trained hip-hop dance, athletics and later swimming.

Before turning 18, Nevena moved from her hometown to study at the Faculty of Dramatic Arts in Belgrade. In 2011, while still a student, she secured her first leading role in the TV series Lime Blossom in the Balkans, which aired on the Serbian national broadcaster, RTS. This role introduced her to a wider audience and marked the beginning of her career in film and television.

Then began a series of film and television projects.

In 2013 she got a film role outside the borders of her country for the first time in the Macedonian film The Piano Room, and in 2014 he got a role in the Dutch film The Sky Above Us and in the short film Mary's Episode co-produced by Serbia and Canada, and film Lafty and the Man in Black, co-production of Saudi Arabia and Serbia.

In 2014, Nevena also completed a master's degree in acting at the Faculty of Dramatic Arts in Belgrade. As her master's thesis, she performed a project on the theme of the novel The Little Prince by Antoine de Saint-Exupéry. For this project, in which six dancers, a live orchestra and two actors participated, Nevena is signing dramatization, directing and acting. After the premiere of the play Little Prince, the renowned Boško Buha Children's Theater in Belgrade takes over this play and puts it on its official repertoire.

In the same year, Nevena got the main role in the Croatian TV series Vatre ivanjske. On that occasion, she moved to Zagreb for a year. After the broadcast of this series, Nevena became a recognizable face in the entire Balkans.

In 2015, she founded the traveling theater Teatar Vihor to gather her generation in one place and open a space for theatrical creation of young people. With this traveling theater, she has covered over 60,000 km and 70 cities in five years, and in 2019, the theater also performed in Australia.

Later, she acted in numerous film and television series, of which the drama series We Will Be the World Champions stands out, where she played the main role of a journalist alongside Rade Šerbedžija and Žarko Radić.

In 2017, Nevena married Croatian musician Marko Vukes and moved to Zagreb.

== Filmography ==
=== Television roles ===
Film
| Year | Title | Role | Notes |
|---|---|---|---|
| 2011-2012 | Cvat lipe na Balkanu | Vera Inda Korać | Main cast |
| 2012 | Prinudno sletanje | / | Failed TV pilot |
| 2012-2014 | Vojna akademija | Bisa Tomić | Main cast |
| 2014-2015 | Vatre ivanjske | Ana Kolar | Protagonist |
| 2016–present | Prvaci sveta | Nevena Vujosević | Main cast |

=== Movie roles ===
Film
| Year | Title | Role | Notes |
|---|---|---|---|
| 2011 | Oktobar | / | |
| 2012 | Made of Ashes | Ivana | |
| 2013 | Lefty and the Man in Black | Lefty | |
| 2013 | Gdje je Nađa? | Girl at the bridge | |
| 2013 | The Piano Room | Nina | |
| 2014 | Oproštaj anđela | Ana | |
| 2014 | Marijina epizoda | Marija | |
| 2015 | The Sky Above Us | Ivana | |
| 2015 | Mirroring | / | |
| 2015 | Drugi Hristov Dolazak | Alina | |
