= Hristina =

Hristina or Khrishina (Христина) is a South Slavic variant of Christina. Notable people with the name include:

- Hristina Arsova
- Khristina Boyanova
- Hristina Georgieva
- Hristina Hantzi-Neag
- Hristina Hristova
- Hristina Joshevska
- Khristina Kalcheva
- Hristina Popović
- Hristina Risteska
- Hristina Ruseva
- Hristina Vassileva
- Hristina Vuković
