= Nikolai Baykov =

Russian naturalist writer in Manchuria

Nikolai Apollonovich Baykov, also Nicholas Baikov (Russian: Никола́й Аполло́нович Байко́в; 29 November 1872 in Kiev – 6 March 1958 in Brisbane) was an officer of the imperial Russian army, explorer, and a naturalist. He spent many years in Manchuria and wrote numerous books on the region. Many of these have been translated into East Asian languages, but only Big Game Hunting in Manchuria was published in English.
