= Hristo Stambolski =

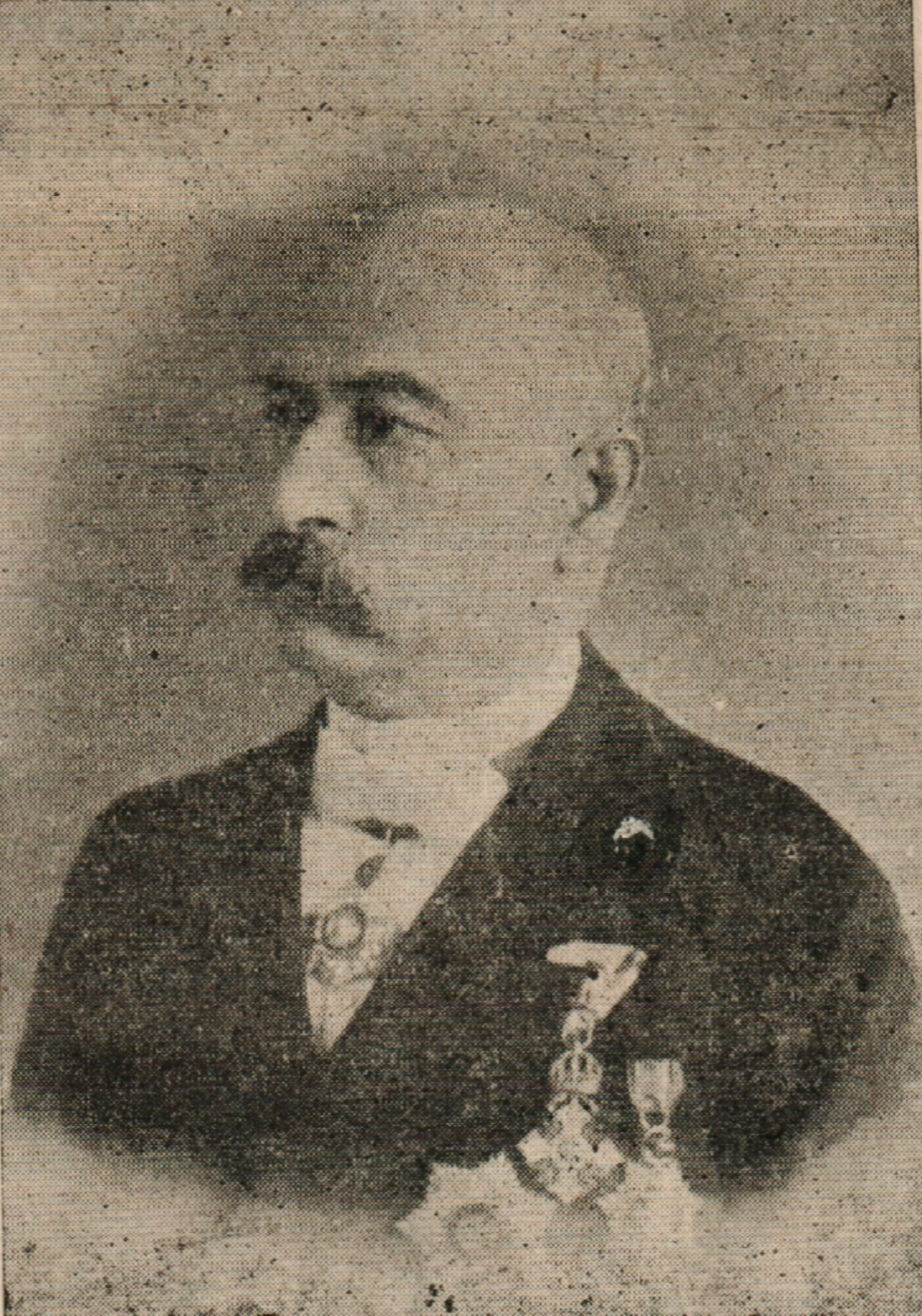
Christo Tanev Stambolski

Hristo Tanev Stambolski (1843 – 1932) was a Bulgarian physician, revolutionary, statesman, and an important figure of the Bulgarian National Revival. He was the first to translate medical terminology from Arabic to Turkish.

== Biography ==
Hristo (or Christo) Stambolski was born on August 8, 1843, in Kazanlak, Bulgaria, which was then a part of the Ottoman Empire. He was the first child of Stoencho Stambologlu, a teacher, and his wife, Dafina. On August 14, 1852, at the vigil of the Assumption of Mary, he was arrested because he helped the priest to use the new Semantron. At the request of influential Christians living in Kazanlak he was released. After this event he started thinking about a free Bulgaria.

He began his post-secondary education in Kazanlak and in 1858 transferred to the Imperial Medical School in Istanbul, which trained surgeons for the Ottoman army. It was during this time that his interest in infectious diseases began. While still a student he helped treat victims of the Istanbul cholera epidemic of 1865. In 1867 Istanbul saw an outbreak of typhus and for his work during this epidemic he was awarded the Turkish Medjidie-Medal.

He became well-known in Istanbul and knew many influential persons. He then used this as an opportunity to take a role in the struggle for an autonomous Bulgarian church. He was a member of the temporary counsel of the Bulgarian Exarchate and president of the Bulgarian chitalishte in Istanbul. He worked not only with the supporters of the church struggle, including Ilarion Makariopolski, but also with the revolutionaries Georgi Rakovski and Vassil Levski. In 1877 he was exiled to Yemen, where he described the disease Dracunculiasis (Guinea worm disease).

After the liberation of Bulgaria in 1878 he returned to Kazanlak and became a deputy in the parliament of East Rumelia. In 1881 he was minister of the postal services and road traffic. During Stefan Stambolov's rule he was placed under house arrest. Later he worked in the Aleksandrovska University Hospital and wrote the book Old Bulgarian History. In 1931 the last part of his autobiography was published. He died in 1932, aged 88.
