= Vadim Baykov =

Russian composer

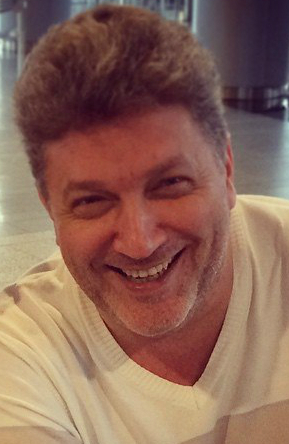
- Vadim Baykov in 2015
- Born: Vadim Gennadiyevich Baykov; 18 March 1965 (age 61); Volgograd, Soviet Union
- Occupations: singer, composer, music producer

Vadim Gennadiyevich Baykov (Baikov; Russian: Вадим Геннадиевич Байков; born 18 March 1965 in Volgograd, RSFSR, USSR) is a Soviet and Russian composer, singer, songwriter and producer.

== Biography ==
In 1970, Vadim Baykov and his mother moved from Volgograd to Klimovsk, Moscow Oblast. In 1972, he entered to the Moscow State Choir Specialized School.

Since 1978, Vadim Baykov participated in various VIA bands such as "Rhythm", "Impulse" etc., where he played on keyboards.

In 1985, Vadim Baykov finished 2nd Moscow Regional School of Music in piano and jazz. Has a second specialty – choir conductor. From 1982 to 1984, Vadim Baykov participated as a pianist in various jazz festivals.

From 1985 to 1987, Vadim Baykov worked in VIA bands such as "Marie", "August", "Leysya, Pesnya". In 1987, he became the lead singer of the band "Spectr" under the guidance of Lev Leshchenko. In 1990, when Lev Leshchenko created the theater "Music Agency", Vadim Baykov became a soloist of the theater. In 1993, he left the theater and began a solo career. From 1993 to 2000, Vadim Baykov released four solo albums: "Russian Roulette" (Russian: Русская рулетка; 1993), "Arithmetic of Love" (Russian: Арифметика любви; 1995), "Queen of My Dreams" (Russian: Царица моих сновидений; 1997), songs which were written specifically for Vadim Baykov by composer Igor Krutoy, "The Coin for Good Luck" (Russian: Монета на счастье; 2000).

From 1998 to 2006, Vadim Baykov was the artistic director of the collective of the singer Alsou. From 2004 to 2006, he also was her producer.

As a composer, wrote a number of songs for Alsou, such as:

- The Light in Your Window (Russian: Свет в твоём окне)
- Last Call (Russian: Последний звонок)
- First Time (Russian: Первый раз)

As a composer and producer, in 2002 Vadim Baykov released the album "Father's Daughter", in which all the songs sung by his daughter Tatyana Baykova.

In 2008, Vadim Baykov released an album of contemporary Orthodox music on poems nun Elizaveta (Koltsova), Abbess of Holy Martyrs Grand Duchess Elizabeth in Kaliningrad. The album was released with the blessing of Metropolitan Kirill of Smolensk and Kaliningrad (now Patriarch of Moscow and all Russia).

Vadim Baykov producing young artists, among them: the singer Alexander Yurpalov, VIA "VyNos MoZga" etc.

== Family ==
- wife Maria
  - daughter Tatyana (born 15 November 1985), ended a special school with advanced study of Chinese language and Philology PFUR.
  - son of Vadim (born 15 November 1987), musician, composer, arranger.
  - son Ivan (born 29 August 1998)
  - twin daughters, Anna and Maria (born 2 November 2004)
  - son Gleb (born 6 August 2019)

== Discography ==
- 1993 – Russian Roulette (Russian: Русская рулетка)
- 1995 – The Arithmetic of Love (Russian: Арифметика любви)
- 1997 – The Queen of My Dreams (Russian: Царица моих сновидений)
- 2000 – The Coin for Good Luck (Russian: Монета на счастье)
- 2002 – Daddy's Daughter (Russian: Папина дочка; solo album of Tatyana Baykova)
- 2008 – Heaven (Russian: Небо)

=== Famous songs ===
- I have no wife (Russian: У меня нет жены)
- Burning Bridges (Russian: Горят мосты)
- You – My Best Friend (Russian: Ты — мой лучший друг; a duet with daughter Tatyana Baykova)
- Illegal Wife (Russian: Незаконная жена)
- Goldfish (Russian: Золотая рыбка)
- At Ordynka Street (Russian: На Ордынке)
