= Hristo Makedonski =

Bulgarian revolutionary leader

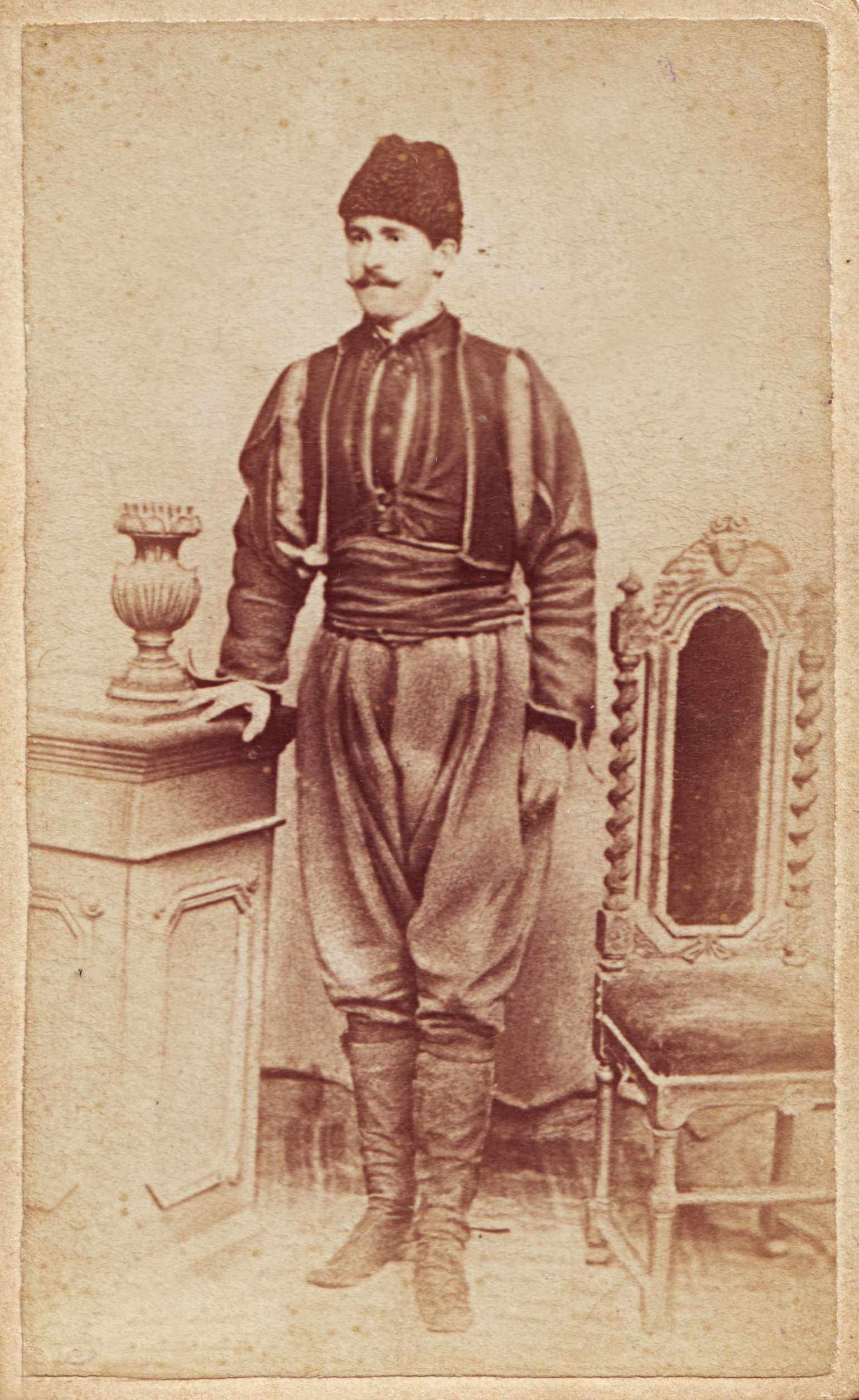
- Born: 1835; Gorni Todorak, present-day Greece
- Died: 5 July 1916 (aged 80–81); Ruse, Bulgaria
- Occupation: Bulgarian revolutionary

Hristo Nikolov Makedonski or Hristo Makedonski (Bulgarian: Христо Николов Македонски) (1835 in Gorni Todorak, today Greece – July 5, 1916 in Ruse, Bulgaria) was a Bulgarian hajduk voivode and revolutionary from Macedonia.

== Biography ==
Hristo Makedonski was born in 1835 in the village of Gorni Todorak in the region of Macedonia (today Ano Theodoraki in the Kroussa municipal unit, Kilkis municipality, Kilkis regional unit, Greece), at that time part of the Ottoman Empire. He studied at the Greek school in his village and has been engaged with trade. After permanent Turkish repressions he became haiduk in the band of Stoimen voivode acting in Maleshevo. In 1862 he joined the First Bulgarian Legion of Georgi Rakovski in Belgrade and fought against the Turks in Belgrade. After the dissolution of the legion he arrived in Romania. In 1864-1865 he led a small detachment, with which on the order of Rakovski made the round of western Bulgarian lands. Later, in the period 1867-1868 Makedonski took part in the Second Bulgarian Legion and after its disbanding in the spring of 1868, moved to Romania. In the same year he joined the band of Hadji Dimitar and Stefan Karadja. After the defeat of the band he escaped in Odessa and then again transferred to Romania.

Hristo Makedonski participated in the preparation of Stara Zagora and the April uprisings in 1875 and 1876. In Serbian-Turkish War of 1876 he was a commander of a detachment of Bulgarian volunteers and fought Turkish troops in the region of Visok and near Knjaževac.

He died in Ruse in 1916.

Hristo Makedonski was a prototype of Makedonski - the character of the Ivan Vazov's short novel "Nemili-nedragi" ("Outcasts").
