= Kurortne, Feodosia Municipality, Crimea =

Kurortne Курортне
- Urban-type settlement
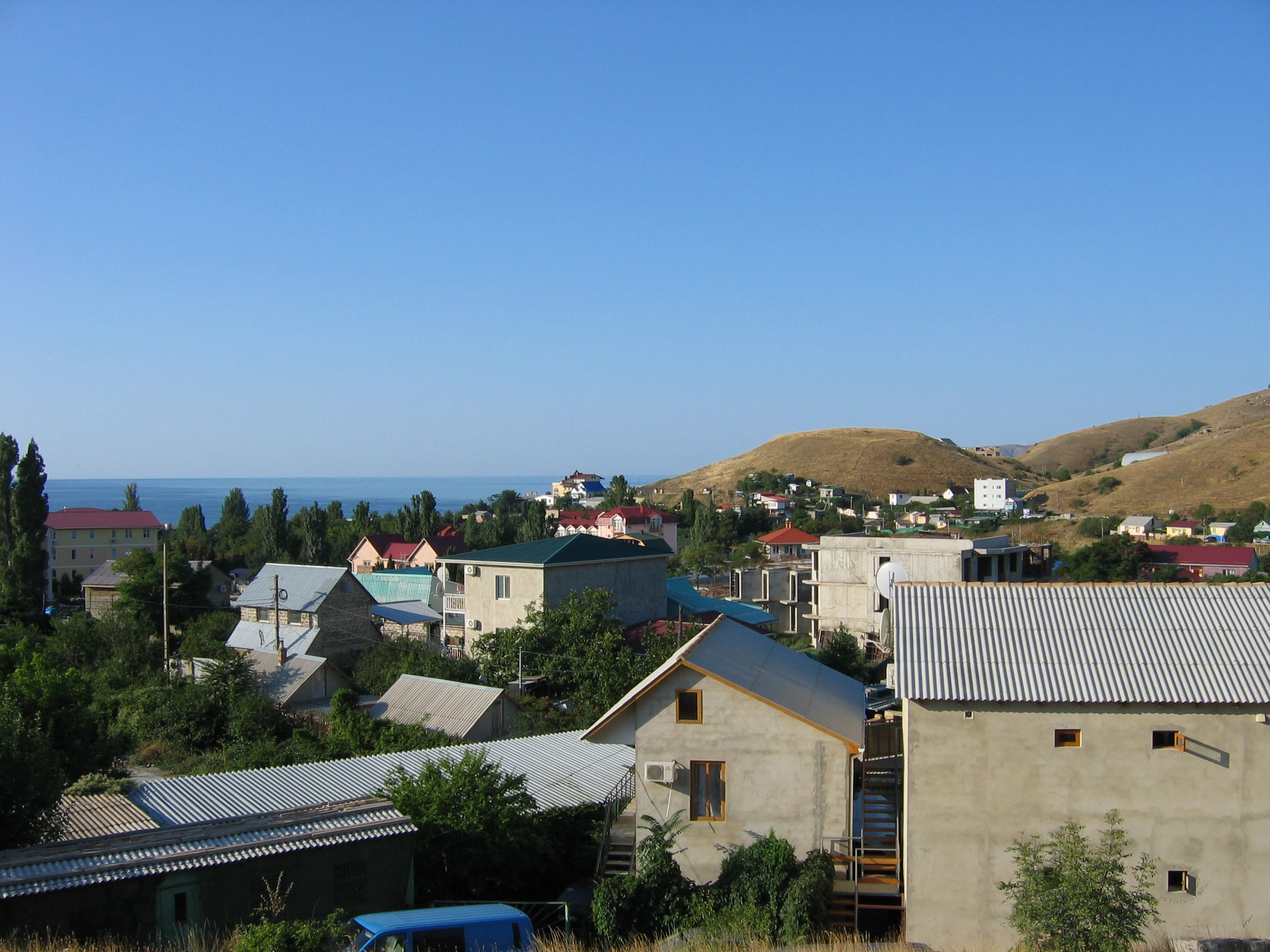

- Location of Kurortne in Crimea
- Coordinates: 44°54′45″N 35°11′30″E
- Country: Disputed; Russia, Ukraine
- Republic: Crimea
- Raion: Feodosia
- Elevation: 12 m (39 ft)

Population (2014)
  - Total: ▼327
- Time zone: UTC+4 (MSK)
- Postal code: 98184
- Area code: +380 6562

Kurortne (Ukrainian: Курортне; Russian: Курортное; Crimean Tatar: Aşağı Otuz) is an urban-type settlement in the Feodosia Municipality of Crimea. Population: 327 (2014 Census).
