= Dalieba =

Chinese bread similar to Russian rye bread

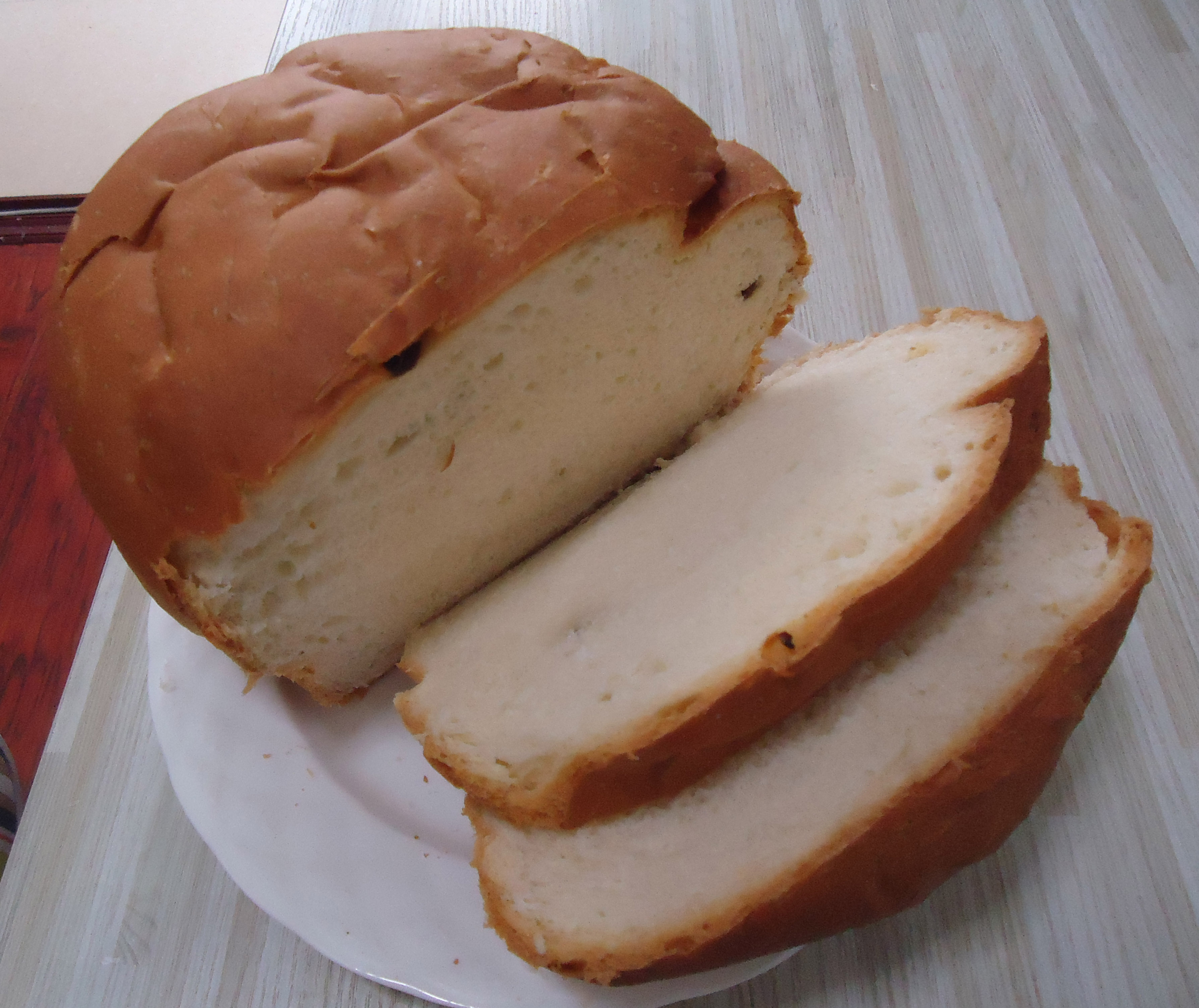
Dalieba bread sold at Dashang Group's gourmet corner in Dalian (2018)

Dalieba (Chinese: 大列巴; pinyin: Dà Liěba; Russian: Далеба; Dungan: Да леба) or Lieba is a Chinese bread similar to Russian rye bread available in Northeast China.

Literally “big lieba” (lieba from Russian khleb, meaning “bread”)—is a large, round sourdough-like bread developed in Harbin and other northeastern Chinese cities. Despite its name and Russian roots, it's made primarily with wheat flour, not rye.

The concept arrived in the early 1900s with Russian bakers who immigrated to work on the Chinese Eastern Railway. They introduced this dense, chewy, mildly sweet loaf, which became a local nostalgic favorite.

== Russian influence in Northeast China ==
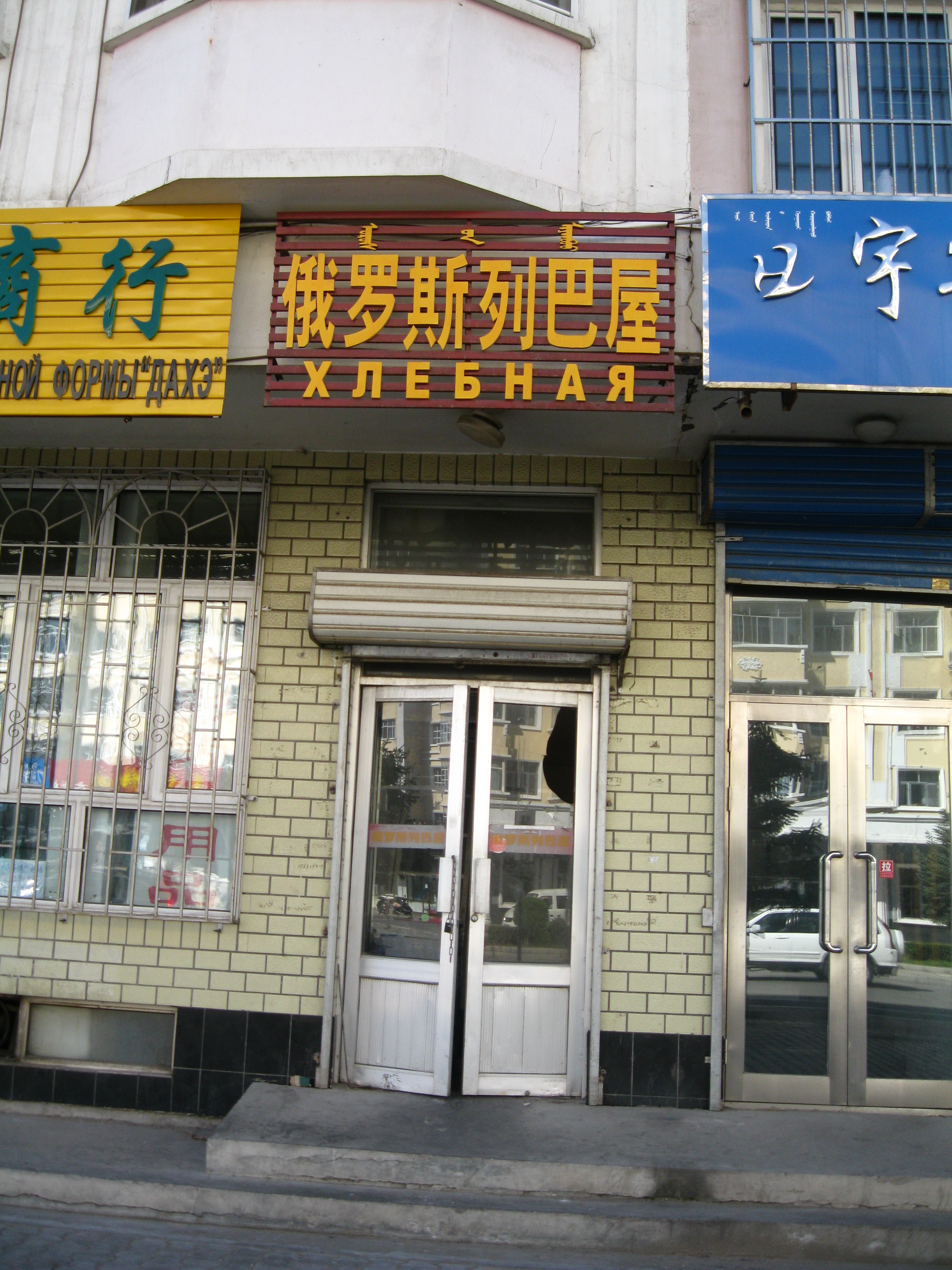
A bakery in Manzhouli, Inner Mongolia, China, showing "Russian Lieba"

Northeast China, at one time known as Manchuria, was considerably influenced by Russian culture, as Russians came there to build and manage East Chinese Railway in the 1890s, to work in the leased territory of Lushun and Dalian in 1898–1904, and to occupy that area at the end of the Second World War and in its aftermath.

The Russian influence on the cuisine of Northeast China may be observed in Dalieba bread and Hongchang sausage.

== Dalieba bread ==
Dalieba is Chinese bread that is made to resemble Russia's rye bread in theory, and is so named from Da which means "Big" in Chinese, and "lieba" is from Russian хлеб which means "Bread" in Russian. It is made from wheat flour, instead of rye flour. Its taste is somewhat sweet.

Dalieba is available in large cities of Northeast China, such as Harbin, Changchun, Shenyang and Dalian, as nostalgic food to some people. Dalieba made by Qiulin Group is considered "authentic", and is also shipped to other cities.

== See also ==
- Rye bread/Black bread
- Qiulin Group
- Northeast China
