= Huotuichang =

Chinese sausages made with starch and meat paste

- Type: sausage
- Place of origin: China
- Main ingredients: starch, meat paste, salt
- Variations: Plant-based alternatives

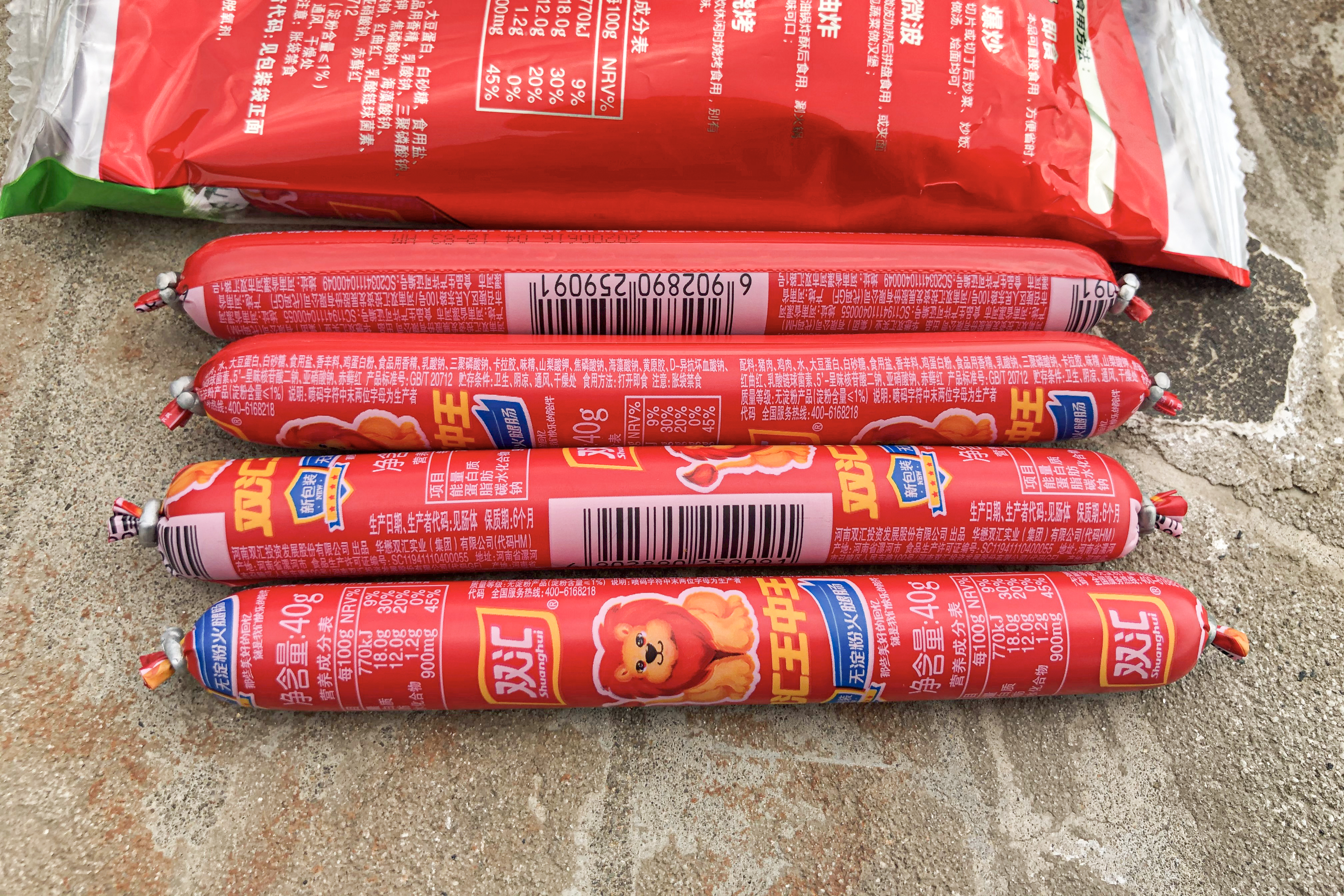
Shuanghui "King of Kings" Huotuichang

Huotuichang (Chinese: 火腿肠; pinyin: huǒtuǐcháng), is a processed sausage sold in China. It is generally made from starch and meat paste, with water, vegetable oil and salt. It is packed in a plastic casing. Plant-based alternatives are also made.

People eat it on its own, add it to dishes or serve it deep-fried on a stick.

== History ==
In 1986, Luoyang Meat Processing Plant (洛阳肉联厂) in Henan imported a sausage-filling machine from Japan. In August 1987, the plant produced a sausage under the Chundu (春都) brand. The product became popular, and the plant expanded production as other meat-processing enterprises entered the market.

In the early 1990s, producers in Henan introduced competing brands, including Zhengrong and Shuanghui (双汇). Competition grew as the industry expanded. By the late 1990s, manufacturers were reducing product sizes and prices. some also increased the proportion of starch. Although meat consumption rose in China, high starch content remained popular because of its soft texture.

== Composition and texture ==
Huotuichangs contain meat and starch, together with smaller amounts of other ingredients and additives. The composition varies between products. Some have a soft texture similar to lunch meat, although the texture varies with the product and its ingredients.

Plant-based alternatives include meat-free imitation ham sausages made with textured soy protein. A formulation studied by food scientists used soy protein in place of meat, together with water, corn starch, vegetable oil and other ingredients.

Huotuichang slices

== Serving ==
People eat huotuichang on its own or use it in cooked dishes. In China, people have eaten it with instant noodles and used it in stir-fries.

Street vendors remove the casing, make diagonal cuts and oil-fry the sausage. They serve it on a stick, sometimes with spices. The outside is crispy and the inside is soft.

== See also ==
- Chinese sausage
- Ham sausage
