= Teewurst =

German pork spread

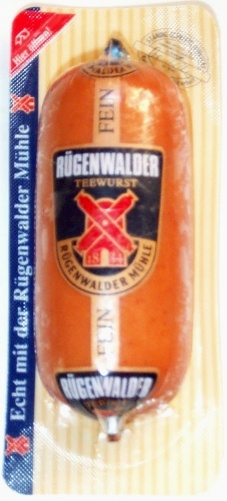
- A pack of Rügenwalder Teewurst
- Type: Sausage
- Place of origin: Germany, Poland
- Region or state: Rügenwalde
- Main ingredients: Pork and bacon

Teewurst (German: [ˈteːˌvʊʁst]) is a German sausage made from two parts raw pork (and sometimes beef) and one part bacon; they are minced, seasoned and packed in casings (mostly porous artificial casings) before being smoked over beech wood. The sausage then has to mature for seven to ten days in order to develop its typical taste. Teewurst contains 30 to 40 percent fat, which makes it particularly easy to spread.

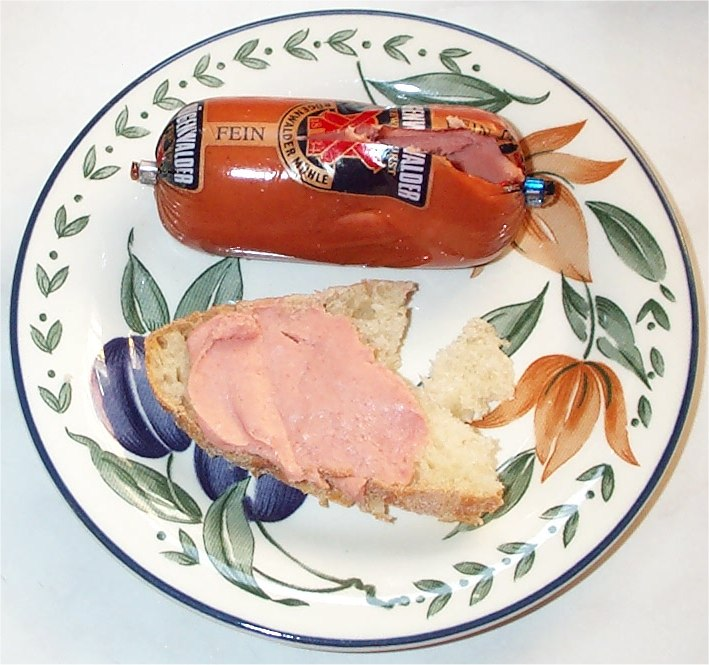
Fine Rügenwalder Teewurst and bread

Teewurst was invented in Pomerania, probably in the small Baltic town of Rügenwalde (now Darłowo, Poland), in the middle of the 19th century. The name, which means tea sausage, is said to derive from the habit of serving it in sandwiches at teatime.

Up to 1945, the sausage industry in Rügenwalde was well established, and Teewurst was its best-known product. In 1927, the term Rügenwalder Teewurst was declared a protected designation of origin. After World War II, sausage makers from Rügenwalde fled or were expelled to the Federal Republic of Germany, where they established new companies and resumed the production of Teewurst. They established an association of former Rügenwald sausage makers, which registered the trademark Rügenwalder Teewurst in 1957. Teewurst was also made in East Germany, but the brand Rügenwalder Teewurst was never used there. Today, only companies that once had their headquarters in Rügenwalde are allowed to use the term Rügenwalder Teewurst. All others use the terms "Teewurst" or Rügenwalde-style Teewurst.

== See also ==
- Ham sausage
- List of smoked foods

== Bibliography ==
- Green, Aliza (2005), Field guide to meat: how to identify, select, and prepare virtually every meat, poultry, and game cut, Quirk Books, ISBN 978-1-59474-017-6
