= Ham sausage =

Type of sausage prepared using ham

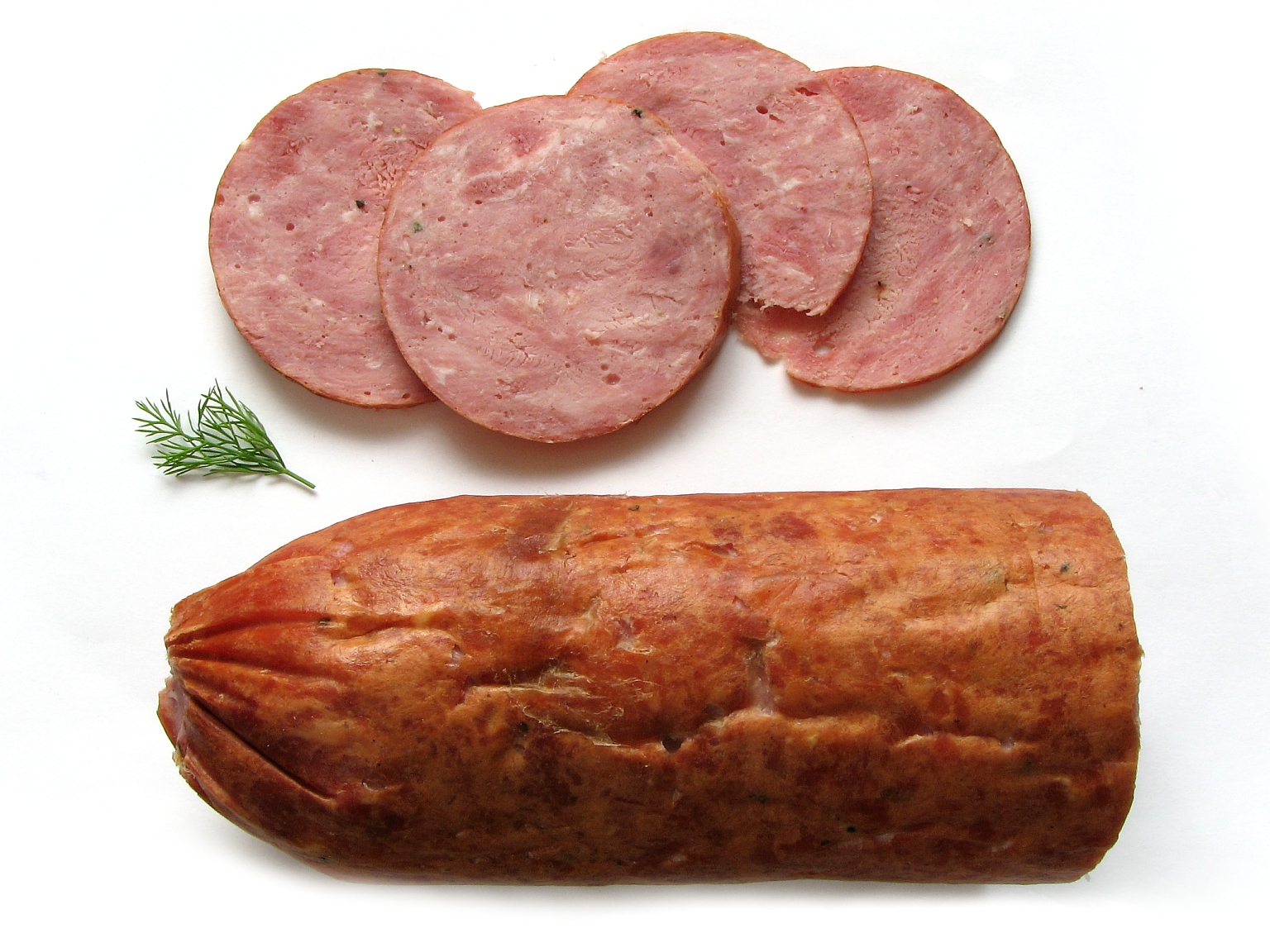
Kiełbasa szynkowa is a Polish ham sausage.

Ham sausage is a sausage prepared using ham and other ingredients, the latter varying by location. It is a part of the cuisines of China, Germany, Poland and the United States. Ham sausage is a mass-produced food product.

== By country ==
=== China ===
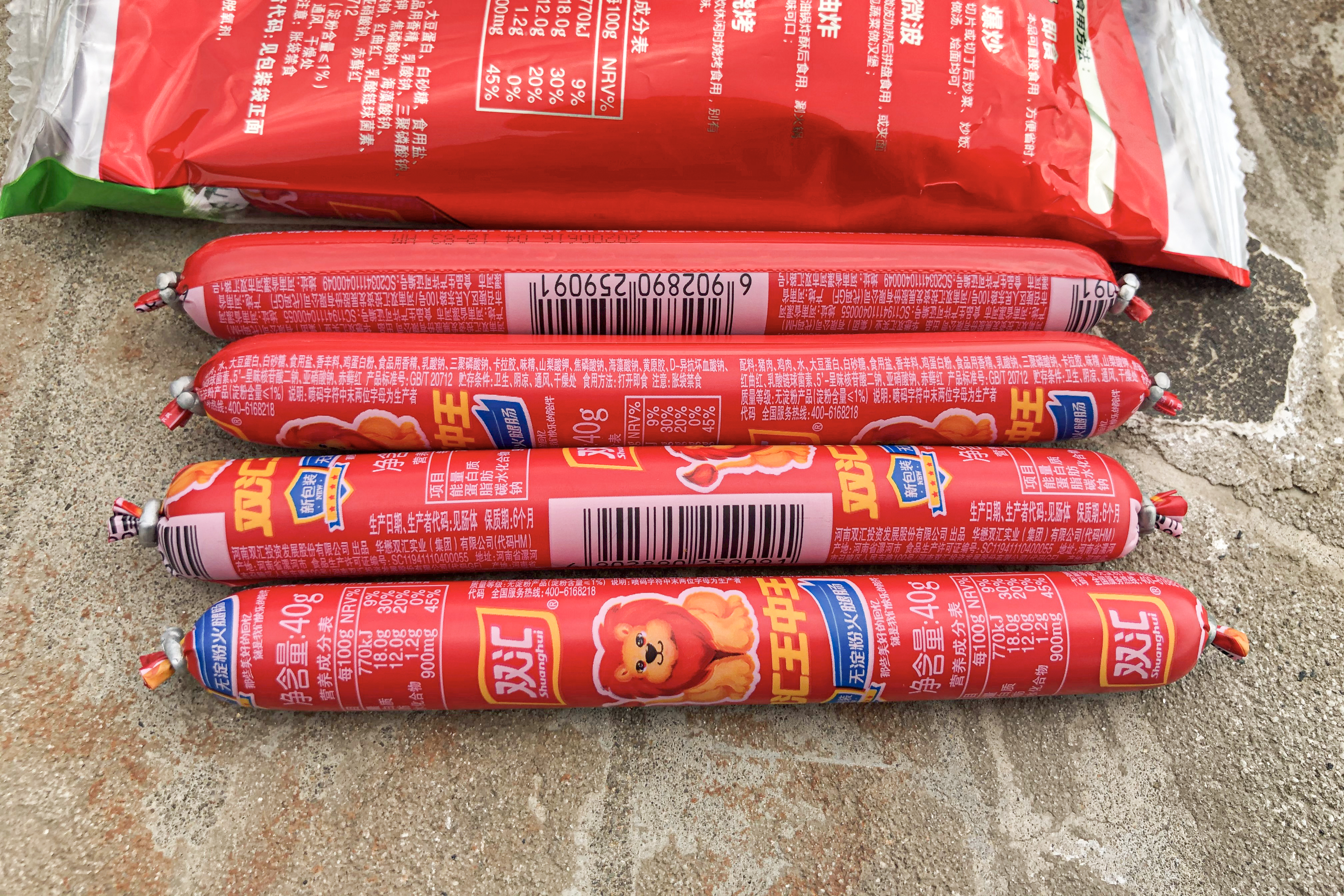
Huotuichang by Shuanghui Group in China

Autoclaved ham sausage is branded as "Huotuichang" in China. Ham sausage is mass-produced and consumed in China, and several varieties of the product exist in the country. The Chinese ham sausage is a mixture of meat and starch, as well as low concentrations of water, vegetable oil, salt, monosodium glutamate and other food additives. A very small amount of ham sausage produced in China is exported to Japan (around 0.02% in 2004). (Note: "According to statistics, China's ham sausage export to Japan stood at only 3 1 tons in 1996, accounting for a mere 0.2% of ...") The Chundu Group is an example of a Chinese company that produces ham sausage.

=== Germany ===
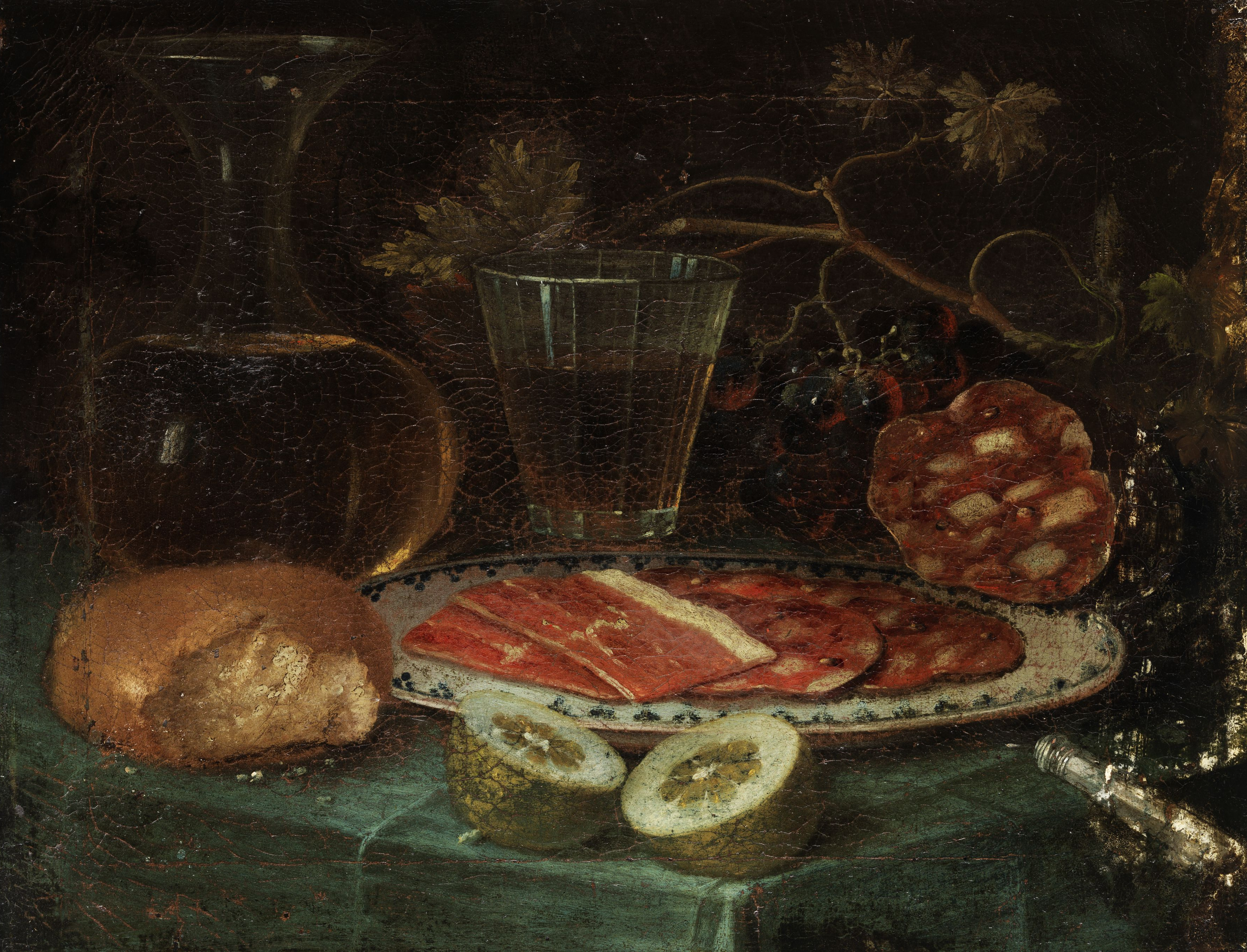
Still life with ham platter. Italo-Flemish, 17th century. Slices of ham sausage are on the right.

In German cuisine, ham sausage (Schinkenwurst) is made from ham mixed with varying amounts of bacon, ground pork, beef, meat trimmings, garlic, and spices. The mixture is stuffed into casings, can be smoked, and is cooked in scalding or boiling water. Ham sausage can be cured using a curing solution that is rubbed into the ham, and machines can perform this process. Ham sausage has a marbled appearance due to the ham and bacon pieces in it, which can be observed when the product is sliced. German ham sausage can be sliced and then grilled or fried, and is also used as an ingredient in soups and stews.

=== Italy ===
Soppressata is an Italian dry-cured salami that is sometimes prepared using ham.

=== Poland ===
Kielbasa szynkowa is a Polish ham sausage prepared using ham, pork shoulder, beef and spices. It can be prepared by hot smoking.

=== United States ===
The Christian Klinck Packing Company, established around 1868 in Buffalo, New York, by German immigrants, sold a ham sausage and other sausage products by 1905. During the 1910s the Edelweiss brand included ham sausage in its product line. In the late 1800s in the U.S., Parisian ham sausage was prepared using pork ham or shoulder, beef and spices. Parisian ham sausage at this time was smoked and then boiled.

Smithfield Foods, an American meat processing company, introduced ham sausage as part of its product line in the late 1970s. (Note: "Radcliffe says he expects Ham Sausage to catch on quickly in the South. By late this year, he says, Smithfield will push into the North, trying Philadelphia first and eventually New York City; he's hopeful Ham Sausage will catch on outside Dixie ...") Sales projections for Smithfield Foods ham sausage were estimated to be 12,000 pounds (5,400 kg) per month when the sausage was introduced, and average sales thereafter of 38,000 pounds (17,000 kg) per month exceeded the initial estimate.

New England ham sausage, also referred to as pressed ham, is prepared using ham or pork shoulder trimmings, and lean pork that is ground, smoked and then boiled. (Note: "New England Ham Sausage, or Pressed Ham: This sausage is very tasty. It is made of lean pork, ham, or shoulder trimmings. The meats are cut about the size of an egg and dry-cured with 3 pounds (1.4 kg) of salt, 3 ounces (85 g) saltpeter, and one pound (450 g) of sugar per 100 pounds (45 kg) of meat.")

== Mass production ==
Ham sausage is a mass-produced food. The Tai Foong Canned Goods Co. in Shanghai, China, produced and purveyed canned corned ham sausage and canned smoked ham sausage as early as 1915. The Tianjin Meat United Processing Factory in Tianjin, China, produces Yingbin brand ham sausage in contemporary times. G.A. Müller and Könecke are German companies that produce a ham sausage called Schinken Bockwurst (English: ham bockwurst) and other sausage products in contemporary times. Smithfield Foods of the U.S. has mass-produced ham sausage.

== See also ==
- List of sausages
- Teewurst – a German sausage prepared using pork, bacon and sometimes beef
