= Tongmo =

Traditional sausage in Vietnam and Cambodia

Tung lamaow
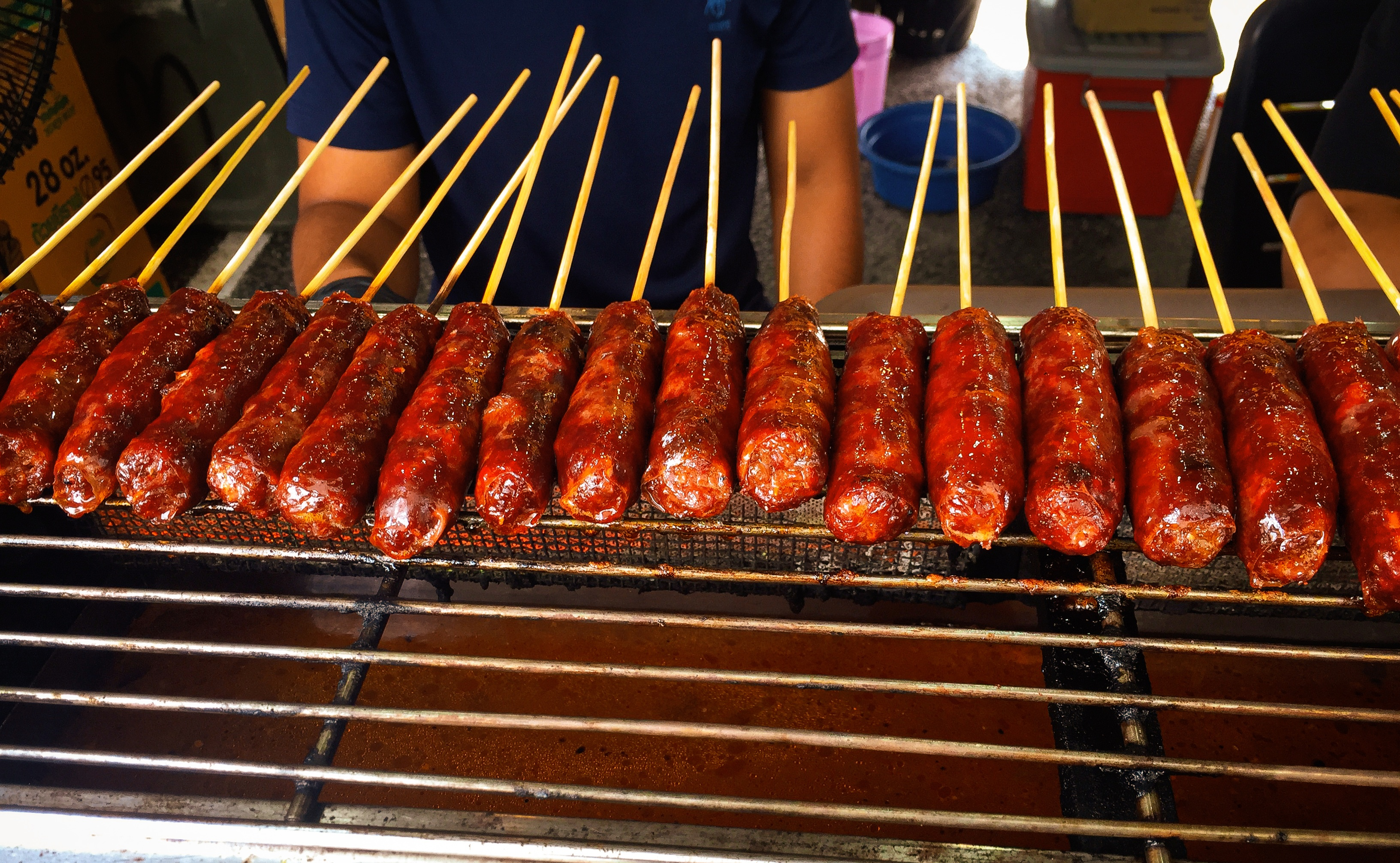
- Tongmo sausages being prepared on the grill in Malaysia
- Alternative names: tung lò mò, tongmo
- Course: Snack
- Place of origin: Vietnam and Cambodia
- Created by: Cham people
- Serving temperature: Hot or room temperature
- Main ingredients: Beef (thigh muscle), cow intestines, fat, ginger, chili, star anise, garlic, sticky rice
- Variations: Chinese sausages

Tung lamaow (Cham: ꨓꨭꩂ ꨤꨟꨯꨱꨥ, Vietnamese: tung lò mò) or tongmo is a type of beef sausage made by the Cham community in Vietnam and Cambodia, as well as by members of their diaspora in Malaysia and Thailand.

== Overview ==
The name of this dish combines the words ꨓꨭꩂ tung meaning "intestine" and ꨤꨟꨯꨱꨥ lamaow meaning "cow" or "beef".

This sausage was introduced to Malaysia and Southern Thailand by Cham refugees who migrated from conflict-stricken Indochina during the 1970s.

== Preparation and serving ==
Tung lamaow is made using specific cuts of beef, primarily the tougher thigh muscle, as well as fat from the cow's stomach lining and intestines. The beef is finely minced and marinated with ginger to neutralize any strong odors. This minced beef is then combined with fat in a 1:5 ratio, creating a rich mixture that is packed into cleaned cow intestines.

To enhance flavor, seasonings such as chili, star anise and garlic are incorporated, along with filler such as sticky rice. Once stuffed, the intestine casing is sectioned and pierced to allow excess moisture to escape, preventing bursting as it dries. The sausages are then sun-dried for 2–3 days to develop their texture and flavor.

After drying, tung lamaow is typically grilled and served with pickled papaya or soy sauce, though it can also be prepared by steaming, frying, or incorporating it into other dishes.

== See also ==
- Cham cuisine
- Chinese sausage
- List of sausages
