= Churin and Qiulin =

Successors of a defunct Harbin food & retail company

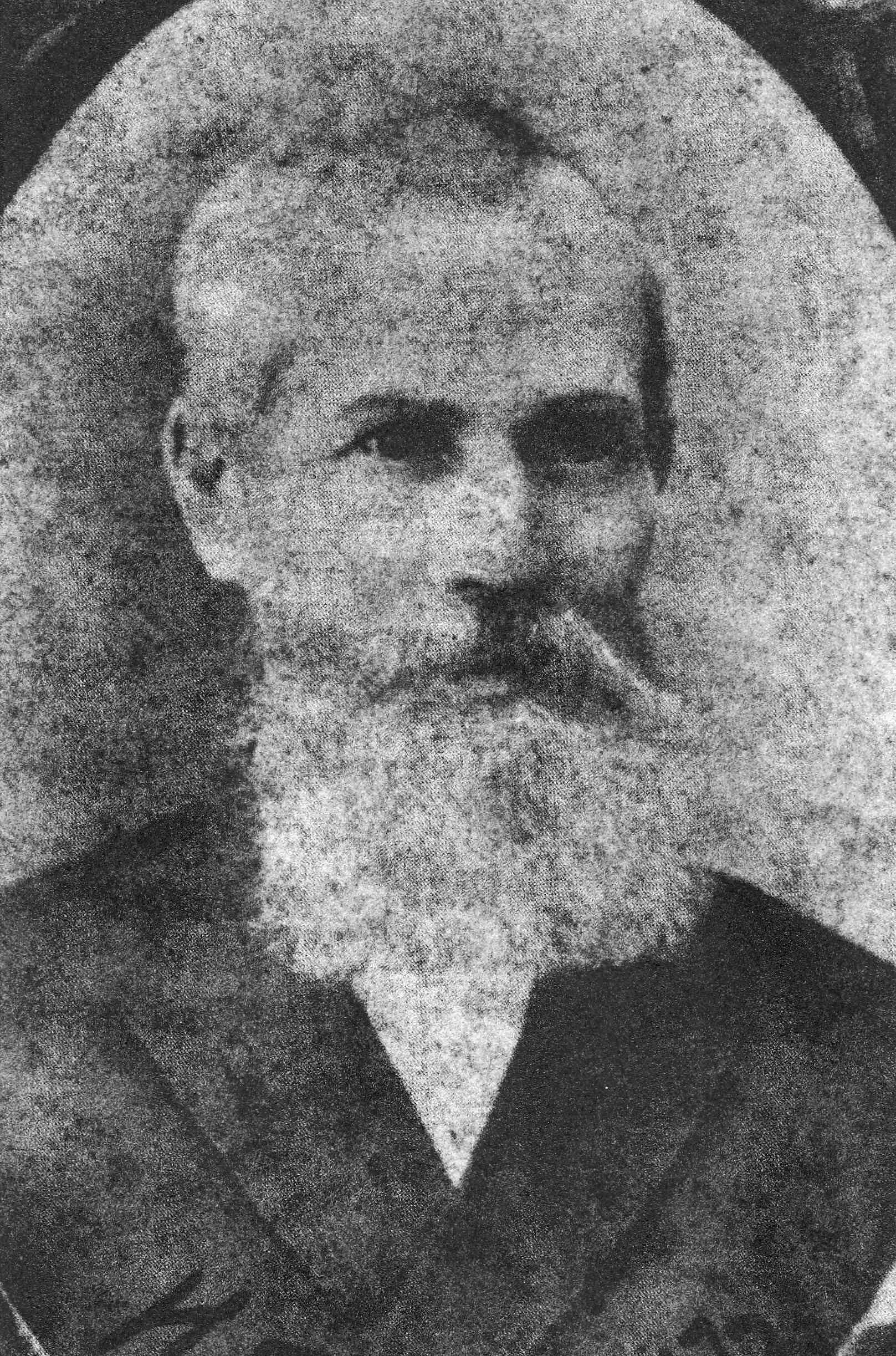
Ivan Yakovlevich Churin (1833–1895), the founder of Churin & Co.

Churin & Co. (SSE: 600891 [delisted]) is the largest department store in Harbin, the capital of Heilongjiang Province, China. Established in 1867, the company has a history of over 150 years. The company invented Hongchang sausages in 1909, a staple in the local Russian-influenced cuisine.

The then state-owned Churin was broken into two when the retail part (and the stock code) was privatized in 2004, forming the Churin Group (Chinese: 秋林集团; pinyin: Qiūlín Jítuán). The food industry part was subsequently privatized as Qiulin Lidaosi (Chinese: 秋林里道斯; pinyin: Qiūlín Lidaosi; more etymologically Churin-Litovsk) in 2007. The two descendants have been in conflict since 2011, when Churin Group expelled Qiulin Lidaosi products from its stores and formed its own food manufactory.

== History ==
=== Russian roots ===
Qiulin Group's history goes back to 1867, when Ivan Yakovlevich Churin (October 16, 1833 – April 30, 1895), a Russian who was born in Irkutsk, opened a store in Nikolayevsk-on-Amur. In 1882, he established Churin & Co. (Russian: Чурин и Ко) in Khabarovsk, with his business partners Касьяновы, Бабинцевы, Писаревы, and Мамонтовы.

As the Chinese Eastern Railway was completed in 1904, Churin expanded his business to Harbin with the same name (Chinese: 秋林洋行, "Churin foreign trading Co."). The current building of the company's department store is from 1904. Later his business further expanded to Lushun and Yingkou.

=== Move to China ===
After the Russian Revolution in 1917, Churin moved its headquarters to Harbin in 1923. During the 1930s, it established branches in Dalian, Mukden, Changchun, Siping, Jilin, Heihe and Hailar. It became controlled by Hong Kong and Shanghai Bank in 1937, and was under Japanese management in 1941.

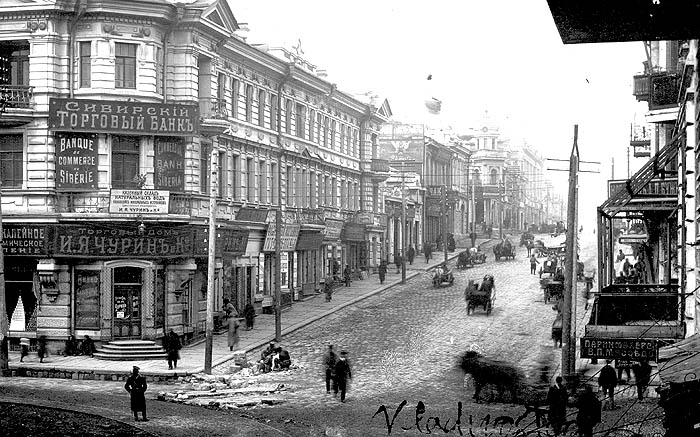
Vladivostok store, an old picture

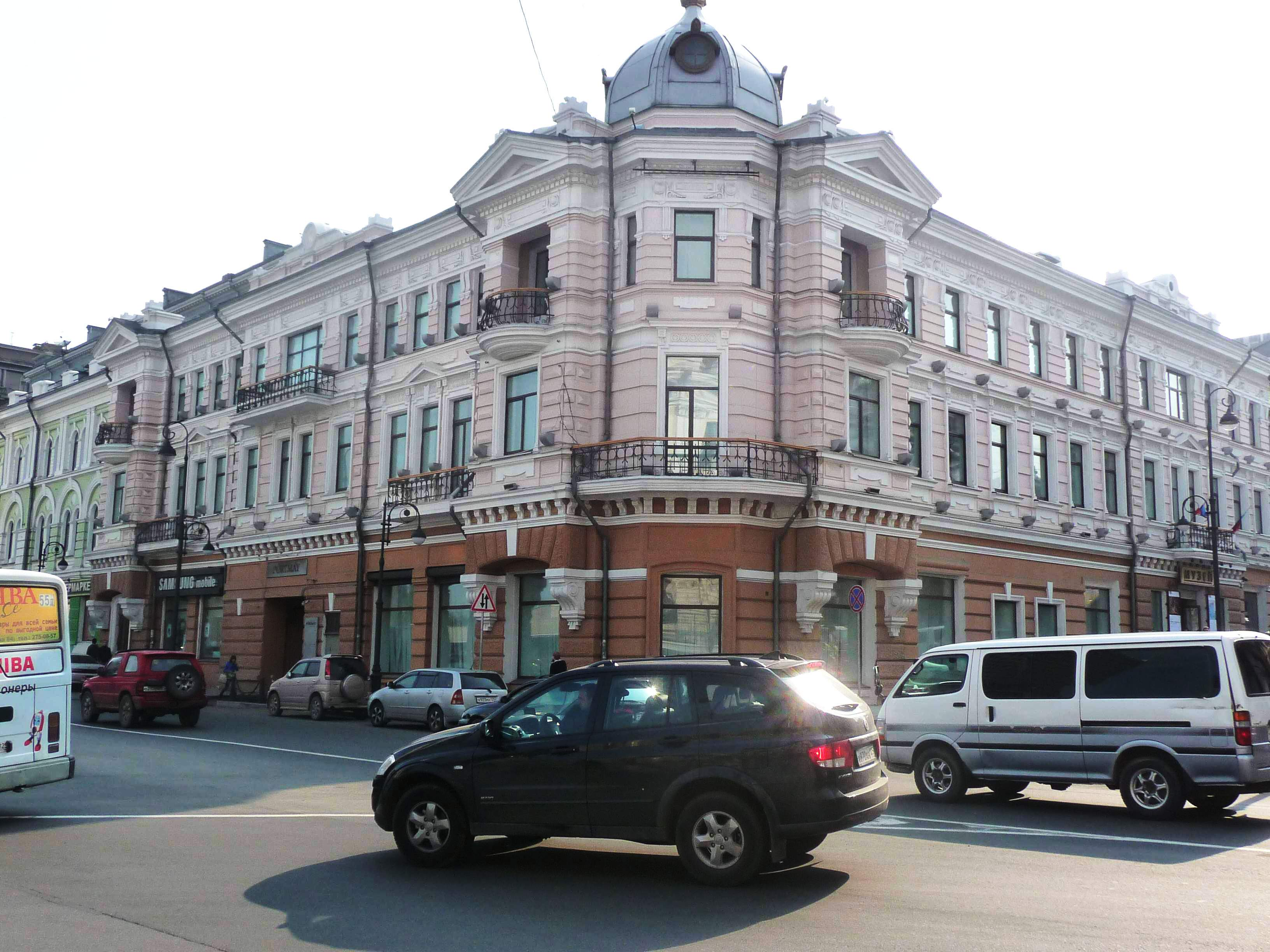
Vladivostok store, a recent picture

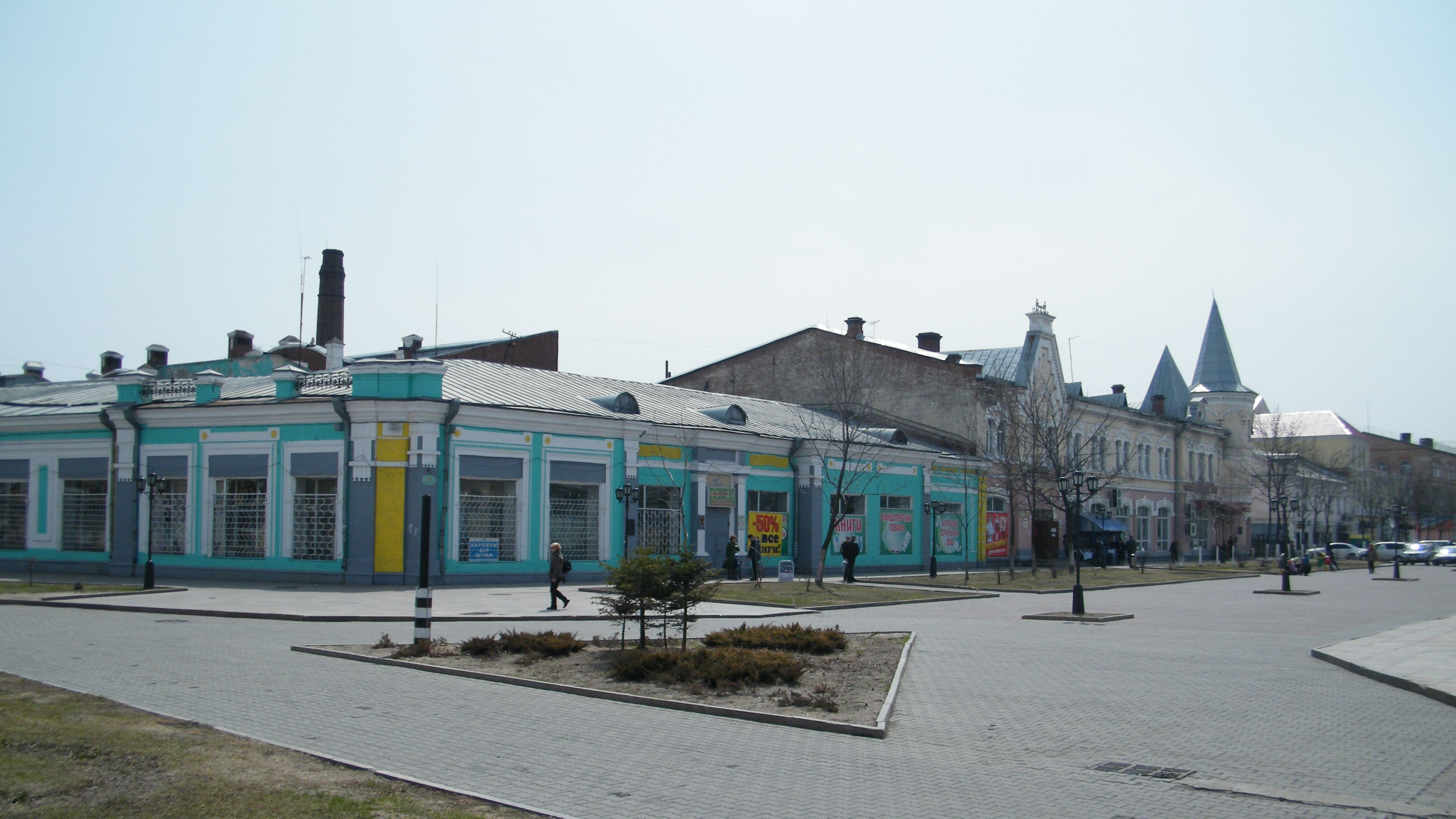
Ussuriysk store

After the Second World War, Churin was owned by the Soviet Union in 1947, and was returned to China under state ownership in 1953. During the Cultural Revolution its name was changed to "The East Is Red" Department Store, but was changed to its original name in 1984. Qiulin Group was registered in the Shanghai Stock Exchange in 1996, and was acquired by Dalian's Dashang Group in the same year.

=== Breakup and conflict ===
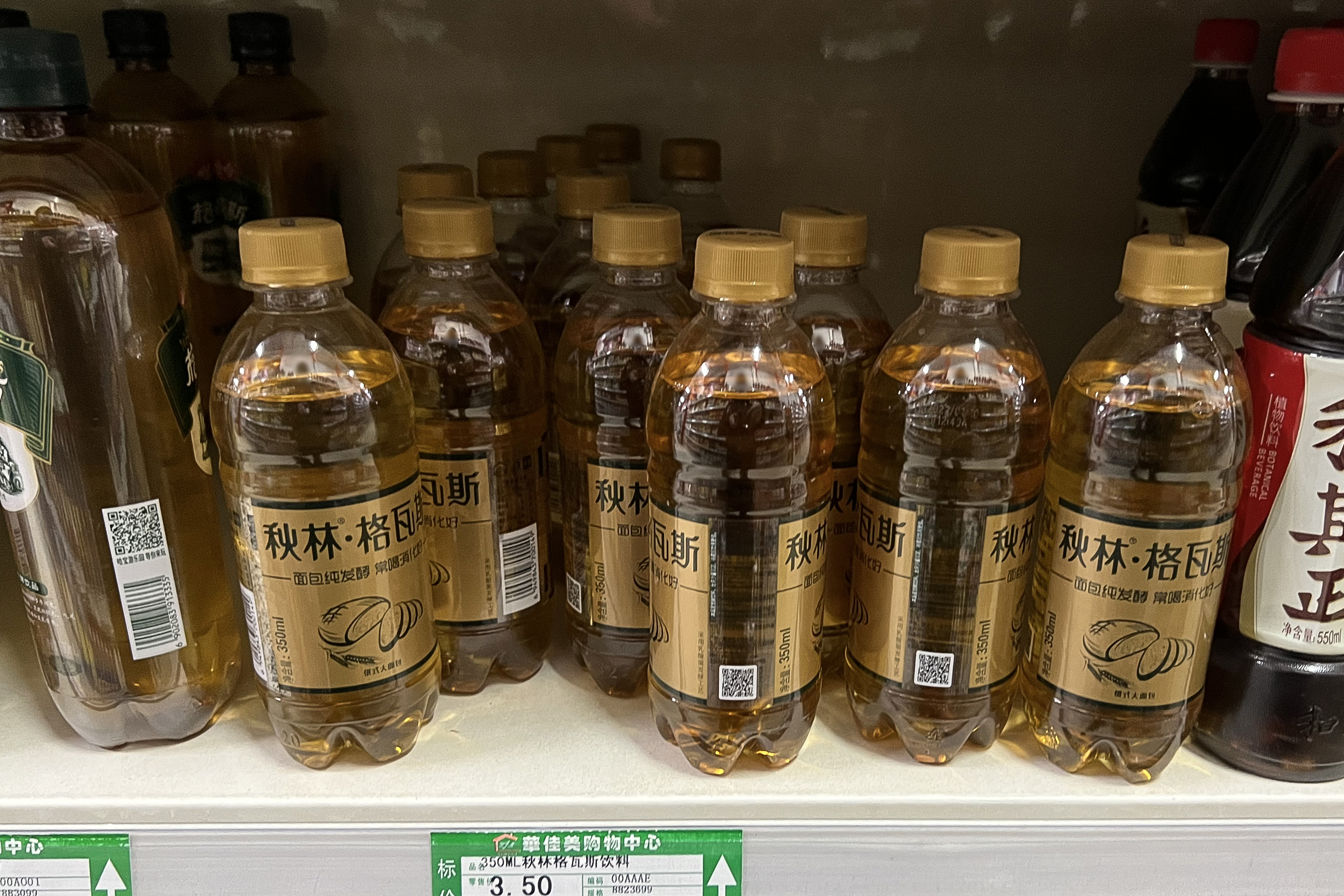
Kvass produced by Qiulin Lidaosi

Churin was broken apart during privatization, with the retail part going to "Churin Group" and the food industry part (meat processing and confectionery) going to "Qiulin Lidaosi". The two tolerated each other until 2011, when Churin Group founded a "Churin Food" to replace the products supplied by Qiulin Lidaosi, producing kvass and Hongchang. In the same year, Qiulin Lidaosi expanded its operations by producing kvass and dalieba.

Conflict between the two entities resurfaced in 2020, when Churin Group's trademark application "秋林集团 Churin Group" was rejected due to similarity with Qiulin Lidaosi's trademark "秋林 Qiulin". Around the same time, Churin Group came under investigation due to mismanagement, culminating in the termination of its SHSE ticker on March 26, 2021, for continued losses.

== Churin Group ==
=== Retail ===
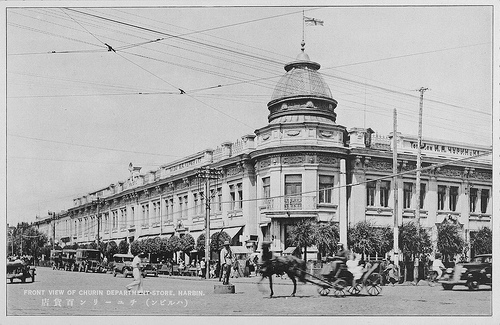
Churin Department Store in Harbin, an old picture

Churin Group owns the following retail locations:

- The original Harbin store, close to Museum of Heilongjiang Province Station (博物馆站) of Line 1
- A store in Jilin City

Churin Group's Department Store has a large food department, which is especially well known for its Russian-style bread, called Dalieba (大列巴) and sausage, Kielbasa called Hongchang, (红肠). Various other types food are sold in other cities within Northeast China.

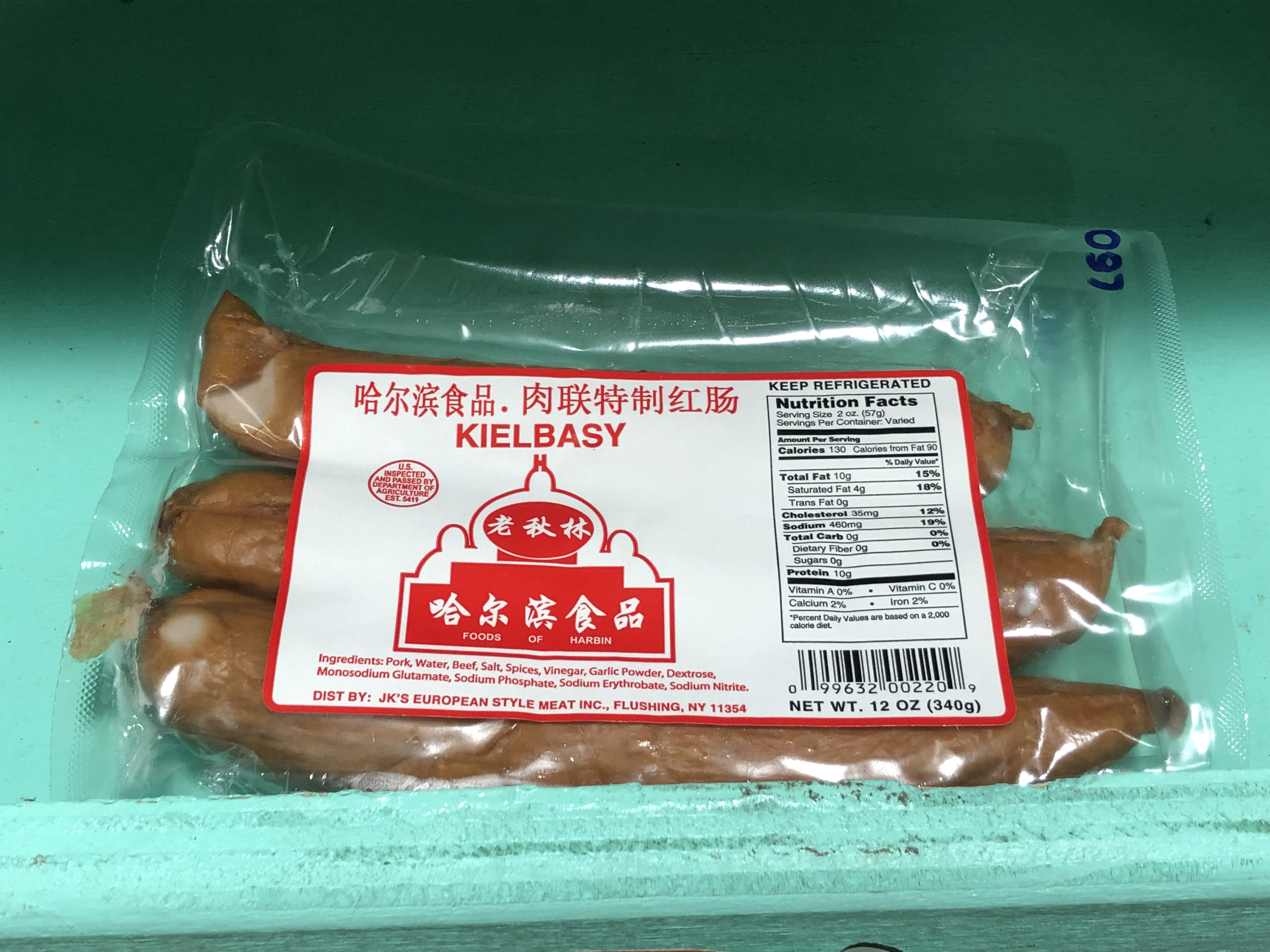
Russian style Kielbasa

== See also ==
- Harbin
