= Chinese sausage =

Various types of sausage from China

Dried Chinese sausages
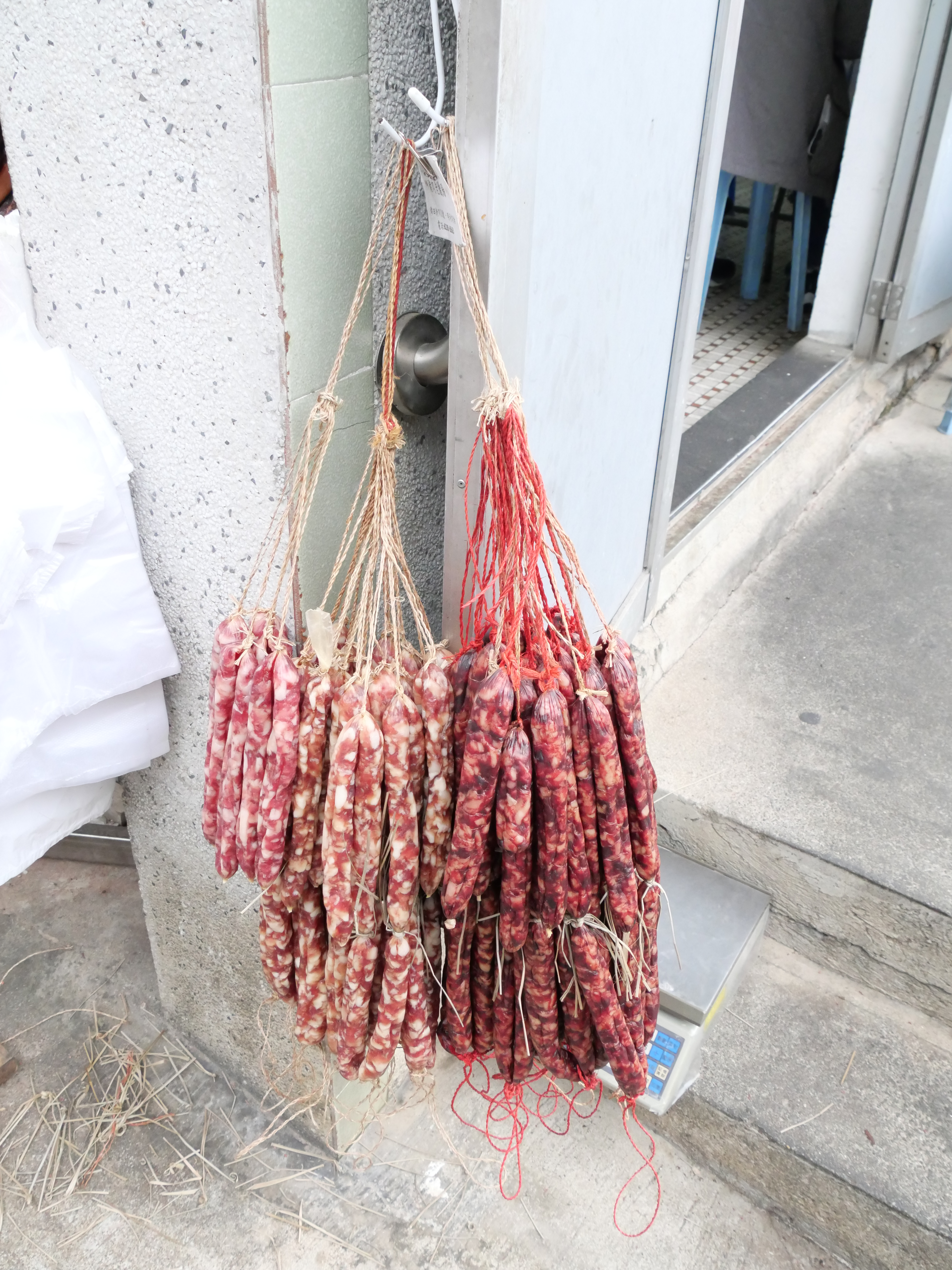
- Dried Chinese sausages
- Alternative names: lap cheong, lap chong
- Type: Sausage
- Place of origin: China
- Main ingredients: fresh pork or liver

Chinese sausage

preserved sausage
- Traditional Chinese: 臘腸
- Simplified Chinese: 腊肠
- Literal meaning: preserved sausage
Transcriptions
Standard Mandarin
- Hanyu Pinyin: làcháng
Hakka
- Romanization: lap cong
Yue: Cantonese
- Yale Romanization: laahp chéung
- Jyutping: laap6 coeng2
Southern Min
- Hokkien POJ: la̍h-chhiâng

liver sausage
- Traditional Chinese: 膶腸
- Simplified Chinese: 膶肠
- Literal meaning: liver sausage
Transcriptions
Standard Mandarin
- Hanyu Pinyin: rùncháng
Hakka
- Romanization: gon cong
Yue: Cantonese
- Yale Romanization: yeuhn chéung
- Jyutping: jeon2 coeng2
Southern Min
- Hokkien POJ: kan-chhiâng

Vietnamese name
- Vietnamese: lạp xưởng

Thai name
- Thai: กุนเชียง [kūn t͡ɕʰīa̯ŋ]
- RTGS: kun chiang

Khmer name
- Khmer: សាច់ក្រកចិន

Chinese sausages are the different types of sausages with ties to China, the Sinosphere or the Chinese diaspora.

== Varieties ==
There is a choice of fatty or lean sausages. There are different kinds ranging from those made using fresh pork to those made using pig livers, duck livers and even turkey livers. Usually a sausage made with liver will be darker in color than one made without liver. Recently, there have even been countries producing chicken Chinese sausages. Traditionally they are classified into two main types. It is sometimes rolled and steamed in dim sum.

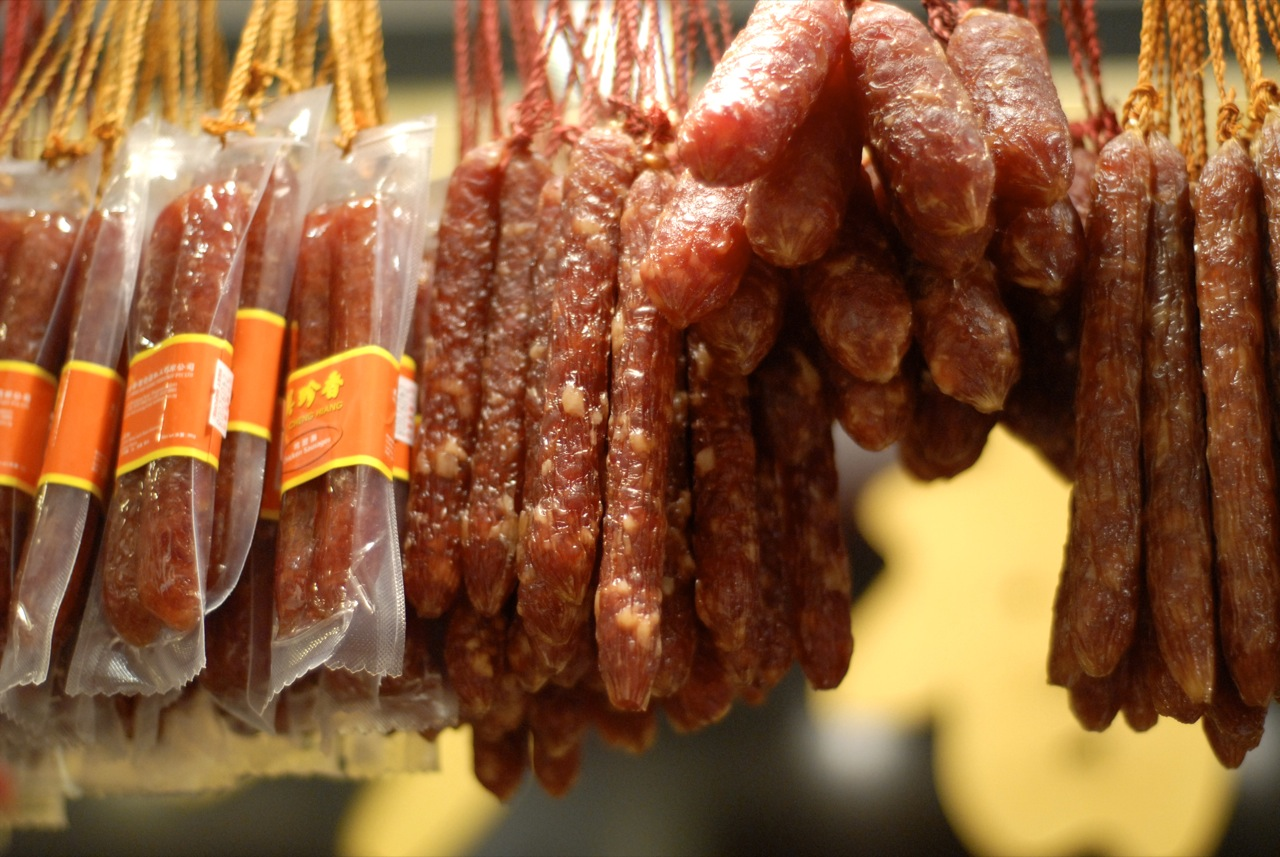
Chinese sausages drying

- Lap cheong (Cantonese, or simplified Chinese: 腊肠; traditional Chinese: 臘腸; pinyin: làcháng; Jyutping: laap6 coeng2; Cantonese Yale: laahp chéung; lit. 'preserved sausage') is a dried, hard sausage usually made from pork and pork fat. It is normally smoked, sweetened, and seasoned with rose water, rice wine and soy sauce.
- Yun chang (simplified Chinese: 膶肠; traditional Chinese: 膶腸; pinyin: rùn cháng; Jyutping: jeon2 coeng2; Cantonese Yale: yéun chéung; lit. 'liver sausage') is made using duck liver.
- Xiang chang (simplified Chinese: 香肠; traditional Chinese: 香腸; pinyin: xiāng cháng; Jyutping: hoeng1 coeng2; Cantonese Yale: hēung chéung; lit. 'aromatic sausage') is a fresh and plump sausage consisting of coarsely chopped pieces of pork and un-rendered pork fat. The sausage is rather sweet in taste.
- Nuomi chang (simplified Chinese: 糯米肠; traditional Chinese: 糯米腸; pinyin: nuòmǐ cháng; Jyutping: no6 mai5 coeng2; Cantonese Yale: noh máih chéung; lit. 'glutinous rice sausage') is a white-colored sausage consisting of glutinous rice and flavoring stuffed into a casing and then steamed or boiled until cooked. The nuomi chang of some Chinese cultures have blood as a binding agent similar to Korean sundae.
- Xue chang (simplified Chinese: 血肠; traditional Chinese: 血腸; pinyin: xuě cháng; Jyutping: hyut3 coeng2; Cantonese Yale: hyut chéung; lit. 'blood sausage') are Chinese sausages that have blood as the primary ingredient.
- Bairouxue chang (simplified Chinese: 白肉血肠; traditional Chinese: 白肉血腸; pinyin: báiròuxuě cháng; Jyutping: baak6 juk6 hyut3 coeng2; Cantonese Yale: baahk yuhk hyut chéung; lit. 'white meat blood sausage') is a type of sausage popular in northeast China that includes chopped meat in the blood mixture.
- Guan chang (Chinese: 贯肠; lit. 'through sausage') is a long, red sausage made of fresh meat.
- Huotuichang (simplified Chinese: 火腿肠; traditional Chinese: 火腿腸; pinyin: huǒtuǐcháng), is a sausage made from starch and meat paste, packed in a plastic casing.

== Regional ==
=== Lap cheong ===
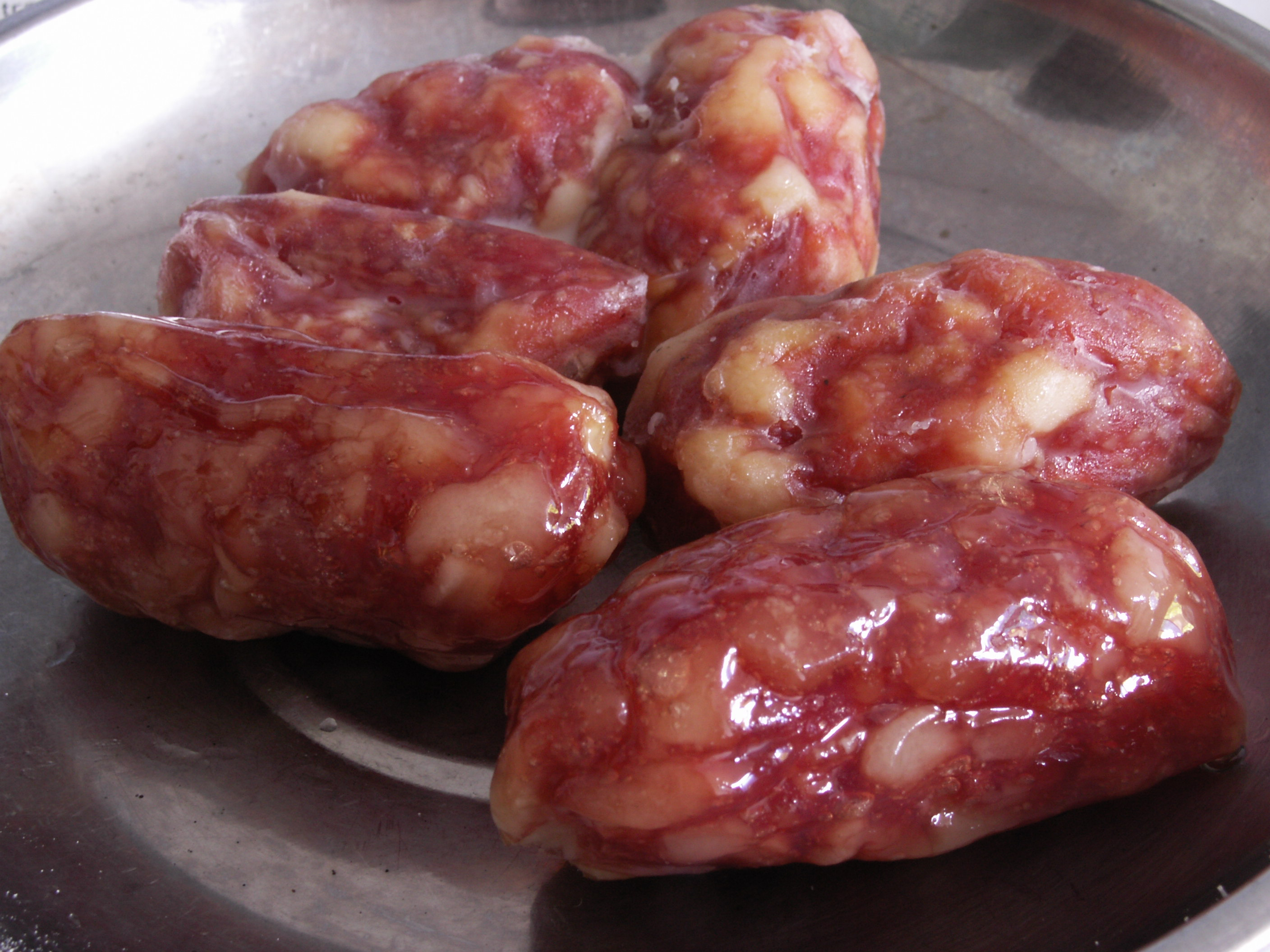
Short Cantonese dried sausages

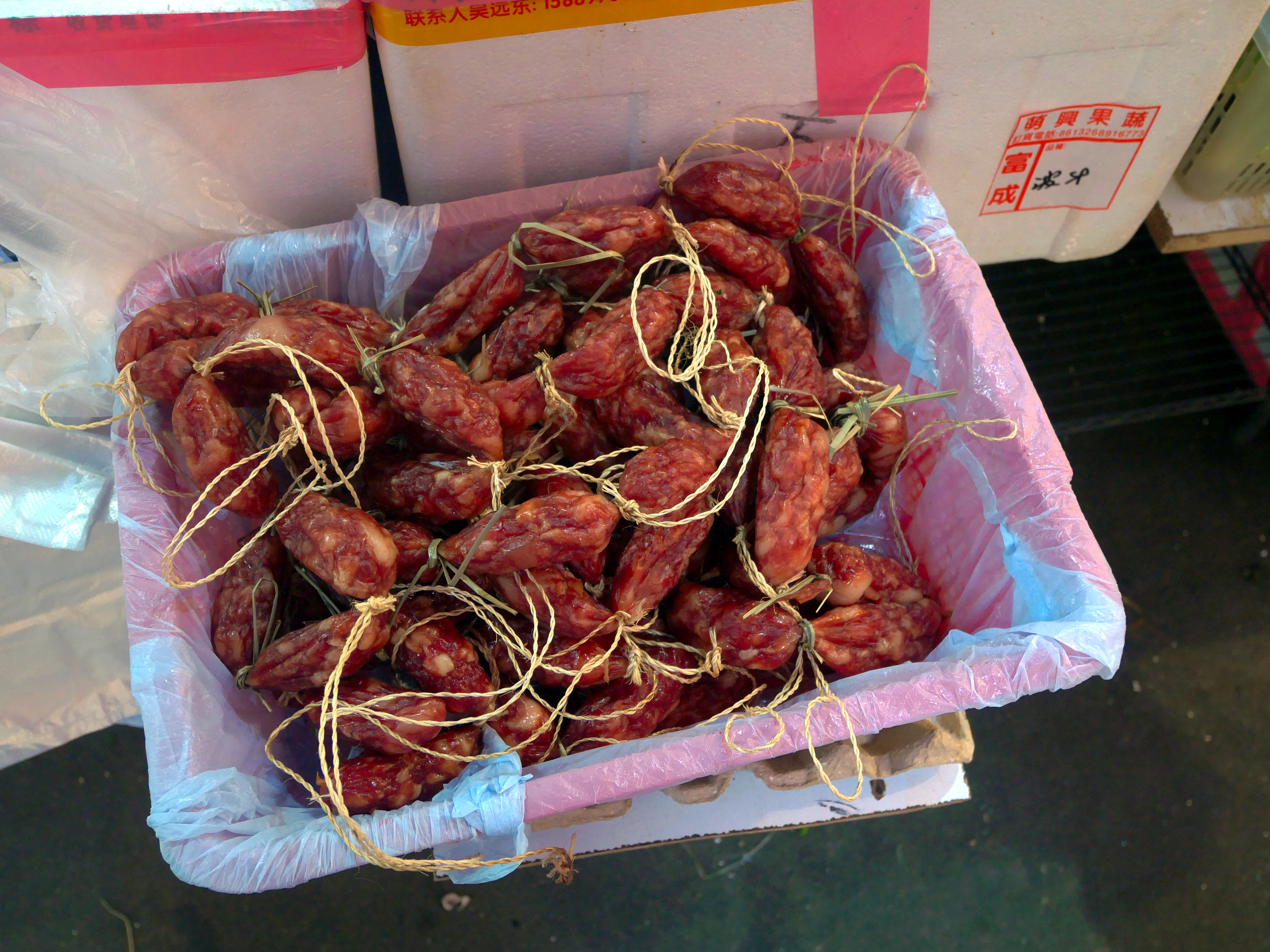
Cantonese Chinese sausages in Hong Kong grocery store

Lap cheong, or Chinese sausage, is a type of cured meat product commonly found in southern regions of China such as Jiangsu, Zhejiang, Sichuan, and Guangdong.

The southern flavor of Chinese sausage is commonly known by its Cantonese name lap cheong (or lap chong, simplified Chinese: 腊肠; traditional Chinese: 臘腸; pinyin: làcháng; Jyutping: laap6 coeng2; Cantonese Yale: laahp chéung). Chinese sausage is used as an ingredient in a number of dishes in the southern Chinese provinces of Guangdong, Fujian, Jiangxi, Sichuan, and Hunan, and also Hong Kong and Taiwan.

=== Sichuan sausage ===
Sichuan sausage contains and is flavored by red chili powder, Sichuan pepper powder, and Pixian bean sauce. Two common examples of such dishes include fried rice and lo mai gai. The traditional unpackaged forms are usually found in street markets or wet markets.

=== Harbin-style sausage ===
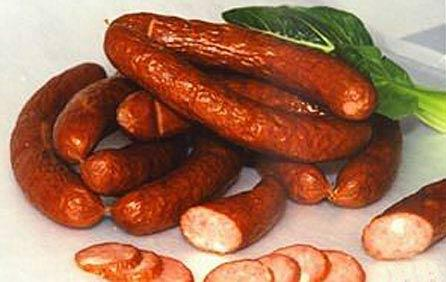
Smoked sausages from Harbin

In northeast China, especially Heilongjiang's largest city Harbin, Harbin-style sausage (simplified Chinese: 红肠; traditional Chinese: 紅腸; pinyin: hóngcháng; lit. 'red sausage'), a popular regional specialty, is a coarsely ground, smoked savory red sausage similar to Polish "country" kielbasa and Lithuanian skilandis. It was first manufactured in March 1909 by Lithuanian staff in a Russian-capitalized factory named Churin Sausage Factory, located in Harbin's Daoli District. An alternative name is lidaosi (Chinese: 里道斯), from Russian колбаса литовская (kolbasa litovskaya, "Lithuanian sausage"). Harbin-style sausage subsequently became popular in China, especially in northern regions. A sweeter dried version similar to southern Chinese sausages is also produced.

== Production ==
Traditional Chinese sausage is made by stuffing seasoned pork into natural casings made from animal intestines, then air-drying it naturally. However, in modern factory production, artificial casings are often used, and hot-air drying is employed to enhance production efficiency. Lap cheong can be eaten on its own and is also widely used as an ingredient in various Cantonese dishes.

Chinese sausage is believed to have originated during the Wei, Jin, and Northern and Southern Dynasties, or even earlier. Its earliest documented method appears in the *Qimin Yaoshu*, an agricultural text from the Northern Wei period.

The main ingredients for Chinese sausage are pork and sausage casings. First, the pork is finely chopped and mixed according to the desired ratio of fat to lean meat. Salt, sugar, rice wine, soy sauce, and other seasonings are added. The seasoned meat is then stuffed into casings, compressed, and segmented using string into desired lengths. One end is tied off, while the other end is fitted with a string for hanging. The sausages are then dehydrated using either natural air drying or hot-air drying, allowing for long-term preservation.

== Uses ==
Compared to other types of preserved meats, Chinese sausage retains its pork fat better due to the casing that encases the meat mixture. In Guangdong and Hong Kong, Chinese sausage is a key ingredient in making lap mei fan (claypot rice with preserved meats). Whole sausages are placed on top of uncooked rice and steamed together. Once cooked, the rich, flavorful oils from the Chinese sausage infuse the rice, giving it a distinctive aroma and taste.

Chinese sausage buns (lap cheong bao) are steamed buns made with whole sausages inside. Sliced Chinese sausage can also be stir-fried with vegetables or mixed into other dishes. It is a common ingredient in a variety of Cantonese foods, including stir-fried glutinous rice, lo mai gai (sticky rice in lotus leaf), and turnip cake.

== Health concerns ==
Because Chinese sausage is a processed food made from pork, it is often difficult for consumers to determine whether the source of the ingredients and the production methods meet hygiene standards. In the past, some producers were exposed for using pigs of unknown cause of death as raw material. Others added inedible dyes or excessive preservatives to make the sausages appear more visually appealing to consumers.

On September 14, 2006, Hong Kong’s Food and Environmental Hygiene Department released chemical and microbiological test results for seasonal festive foods. One sample of "Fengcheng Sliced Pork Sausage" produced in Macau was found to contain rhodamine B, a banned dye also known colloquially as “flower red powder.” This substance can cause chest discomfort, vomiting, and damage to the central nervous system.

In January 2013, a business in Zhejiang Province was exposed for using pigs of unknown cause of death to produce Chinese sausage. A total of 7,500 kilograms of the resulting “toxic sausage” was distributed to various nearby provinces and cities. The responsible party was sentenced on August 23 of that year.

== In other countries ==
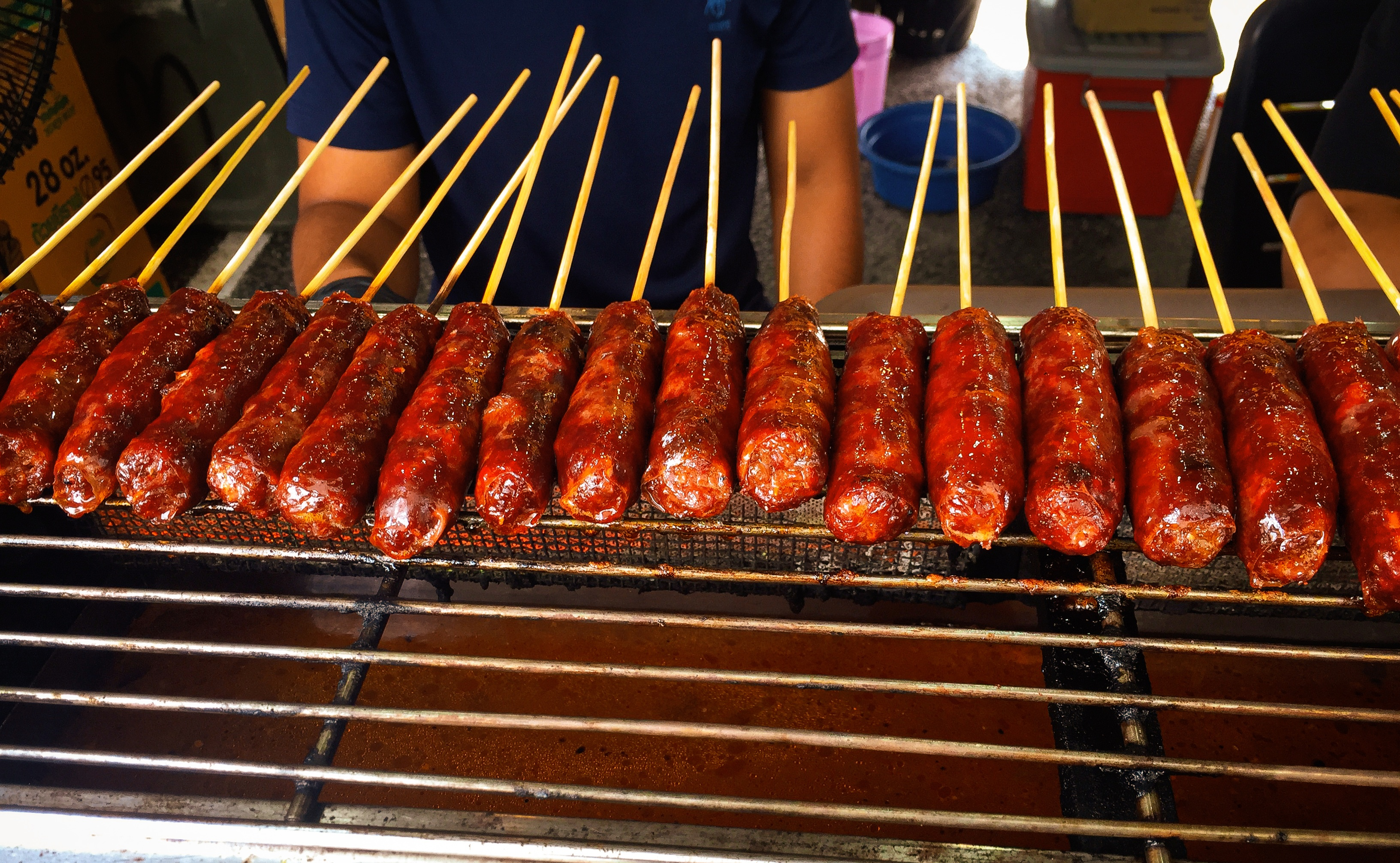
Tongmo sausages being prepared on the grill in Malaysia

=== Vietnam ===
In Vietnamese, Chinese sausage is called lạp xưởng or lạp xường. It has been incorporated into a variety of dishes from simple omelets to more complex main courses. Due to the salty taste of the sausages, they are used in moderation with other ingredients to balance the flavor. The sausages are made from pork (lạp xưởng heo) or chicken (lạp xưởng gà), the latter of which yields a leaner taste. Tung lò mò (Cham: ꨓꨭꩂ ꨤꨟꨯꨱꨥ tung lamaow) is a similar sausage made from beef by the Chams (who are Muslim) in southern Vietnam. The province of Sóc Trăng is the largest producer of these sausages, with other production areas including Cái Lậy District. In local cuisine, dried pork sausage is commonly used as a filling in dumplings, pillow cakes (bánh gối), wontons, spring rolls (bánh tráng cuốn), mooncakes, and sticky rice dumplings (bánh chưng or bánh tét).

=== Myanmar ===
In Burmese, the sausage is called either kyet u gyaung (chicken sausage; ကြက်အူချောင်း) or wet u gyaung (pork sausage; ဝက်အူချောင်း). The sausages made in Myanmar are more meaty and compact compared to those in Singapore or China. They are usually used in fried rice and along with fried vegetables, mostly cabbage.

=== Philippines ===
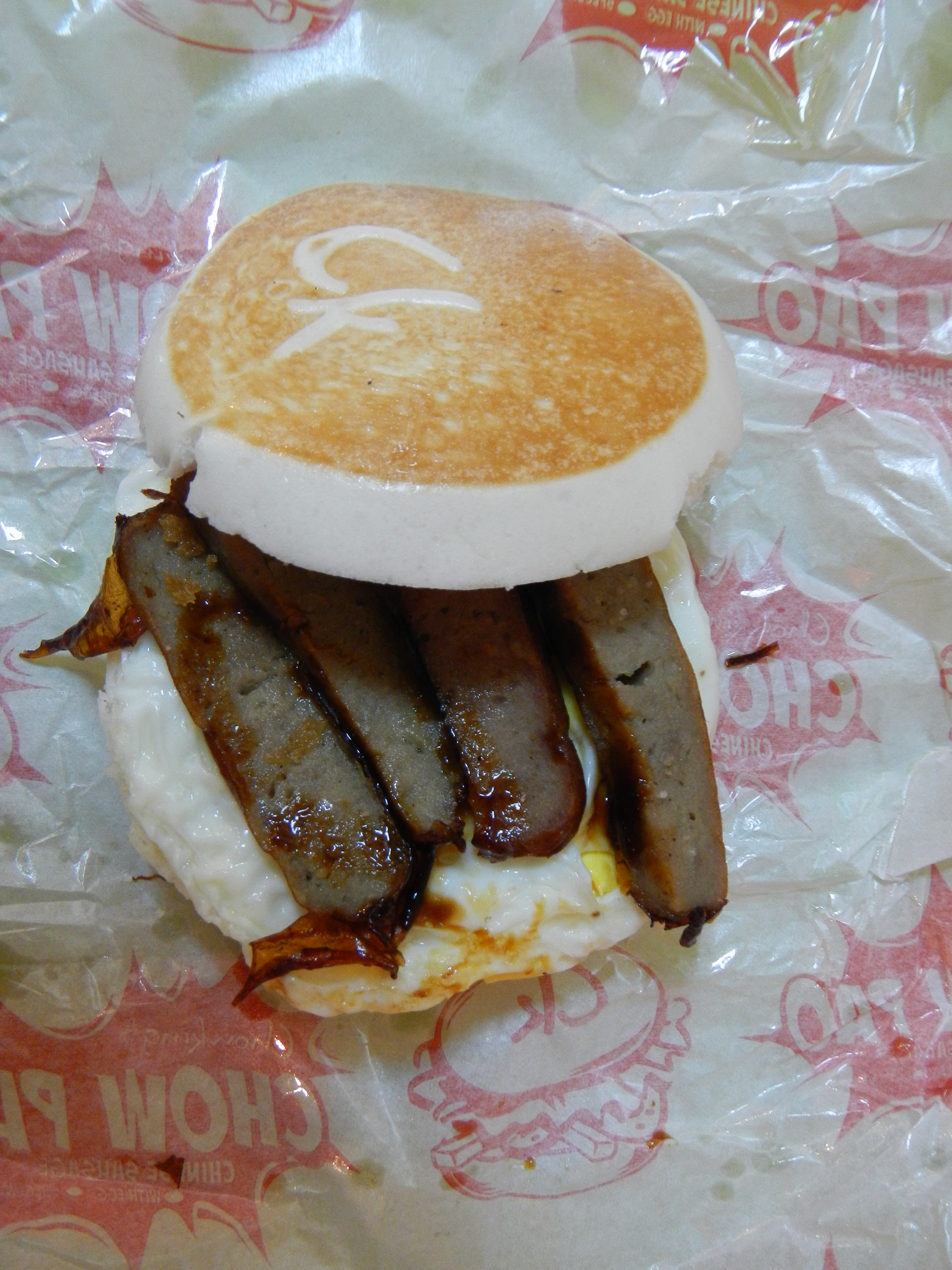
Chinese sausage chow pao with egg from Chowking in the Philippines

In the Philippines, Chinese sausage is an ingredient in some Chinese-Filipino dishes like siopao bola-bola. It is sometimes confused with and used in place of the native sausage chorizo de Macao (which is also sometimes known as "Chinese chorizo"). The latter is not derived from the Chinese sausage, but derives its name from the use of star anise, which is associated with Chinese cuisine in the Philippines.

=== Taiwan ===
Taiwan also produces a similar form of sausage; however, they are rarely dried in the manner of Cantonese sausages. The fat and meat may be emulsified, and a larger amount of sugar may be used, yielding a sweeter taste. These sausages are usually produced by local butchers and sold at markets or made at home. This variant of Chinese sausage is known as xiangchang (香腸) in Mandarin Chinese, literally meaning fragrant sausage. The literal meaning is also the same in Cantonese.

=== Singapore ===
Singapore produces innovative Chinese sausages that could be considered healthier than the traditional variety. Examples include low-fat, low-sodium, and high-fibre Chinese sausages.

=== Thailand ===
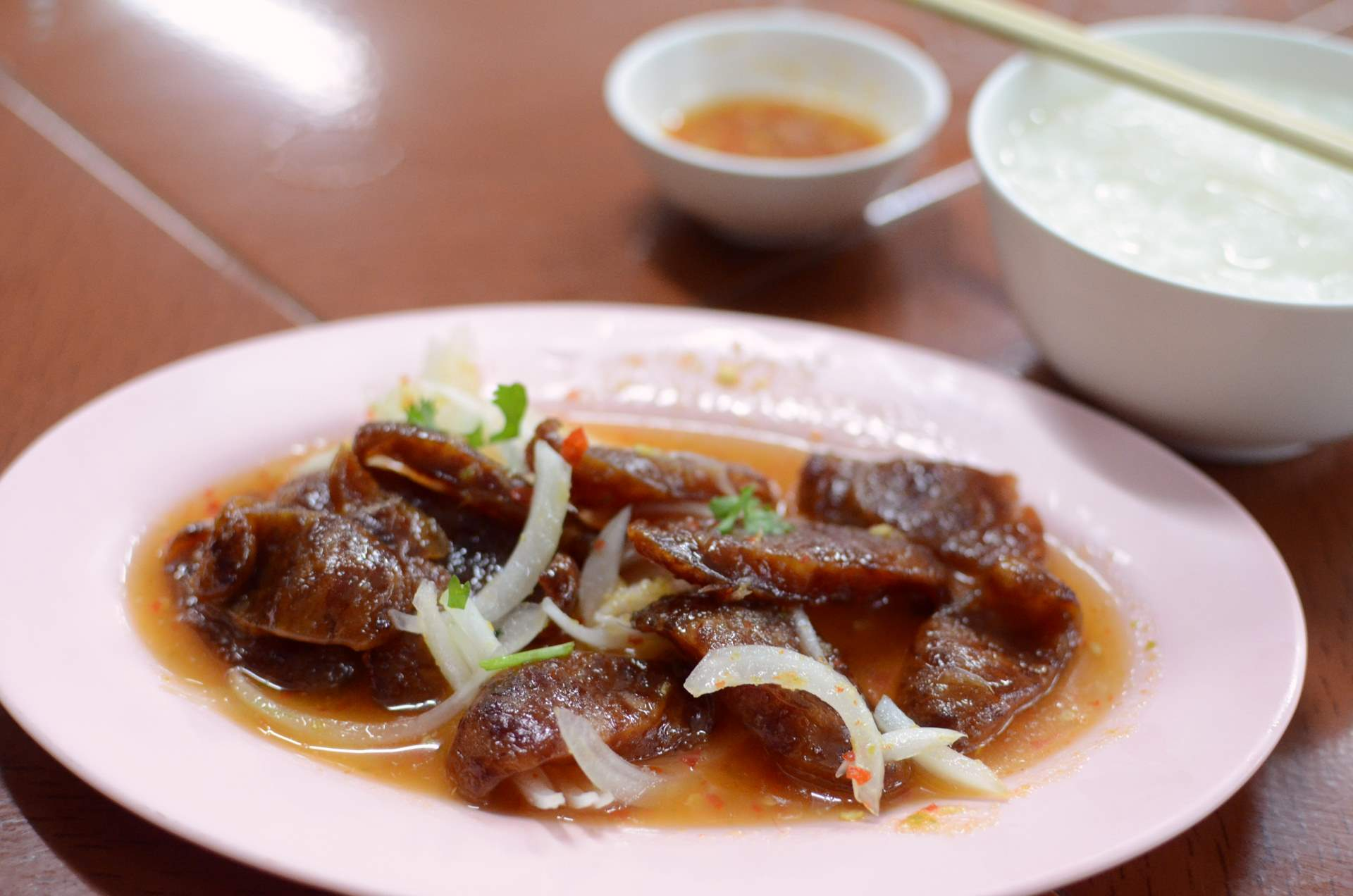
Yam kun chiang, a Thai salad made with la chang

In Thai, Chinese sausage is called kun chiang (Thai: กุนเชียง) after its name in the Teochew Min (贯肠, kwan chiang), the dominant Chinese language within the Thai Chinese community. It is used in several Chinese dishes by the sizeable Thai Chinese community, and also in some Thai dishes such as yam kun chiang, a Thai salad made with this sausage. There is also Chinese sausage made with snakehead fish (pla chon; Thai: ปลาช่อน).

=== Suriname ===
In Suriname, Chinese sausage is referred to by a Hakka Chinese word (花肠, fa1 cong3, 'mottled sausage') rendered as fatjong, fachong, fa-chong, fashong, or fasjong in colloquial spelling. It is part of the dish moksi meti tyawmin (mixed meat chow mein).

=== Other regions ===
Chinese sausages are generally available in Asian supermarkets outside Asia, mostly in a vacuum-packaged form, although some Chinese groceries sell the unpackaged varieties as well. These tend to be made domestically due to prohibitions on import of meat products from overseas. For example, many of the Chinese sausages sold in Canada are produced by a number of manufacturers based in Vancouver and Toronto. Lap cheong is also a very popular sausage in Hawaii due to large numbers of Chinese in Hawaii who have incorporated it into local cuisine.

== Images ==
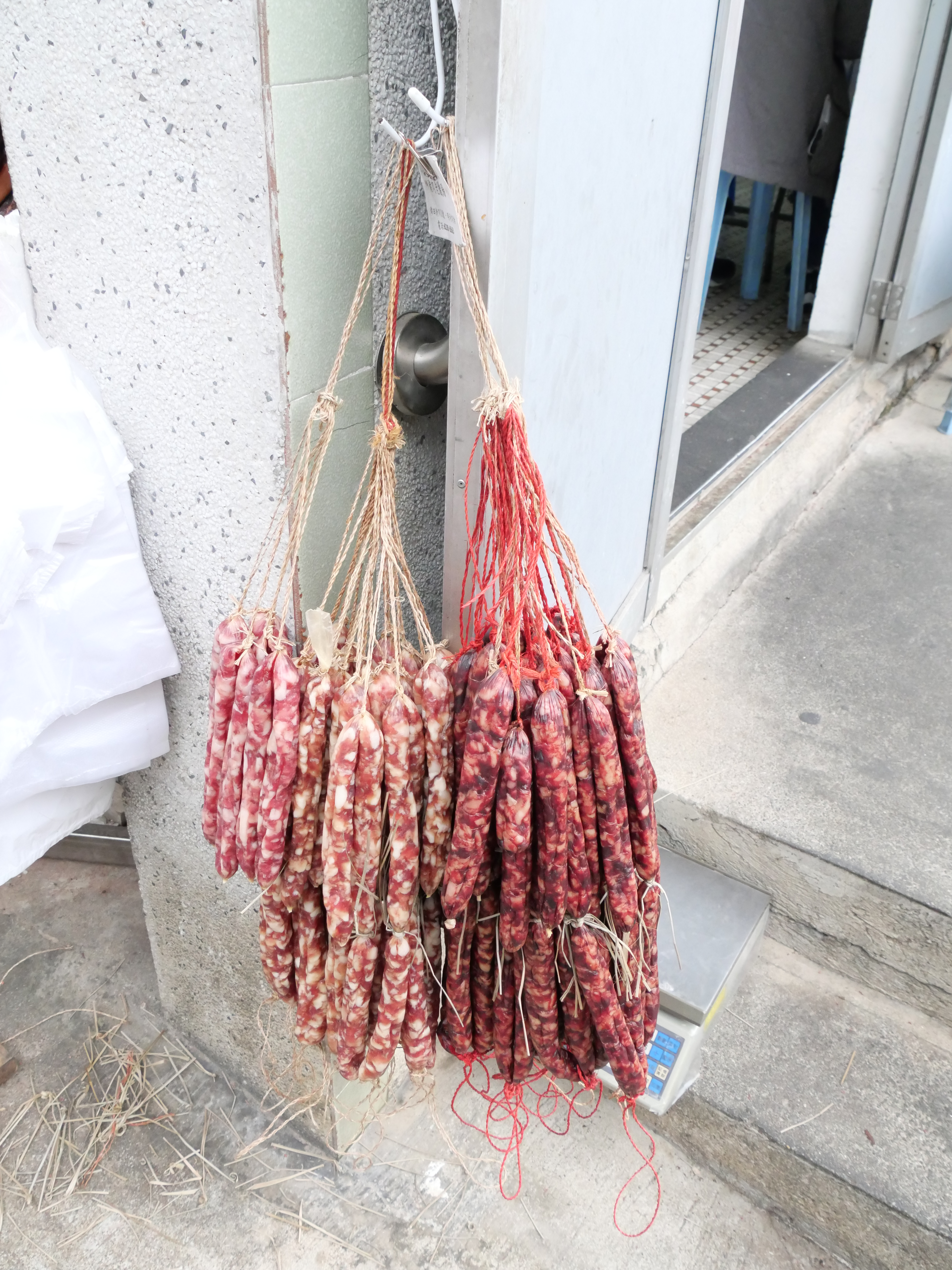
Chinese dried sausages from Hong Kong

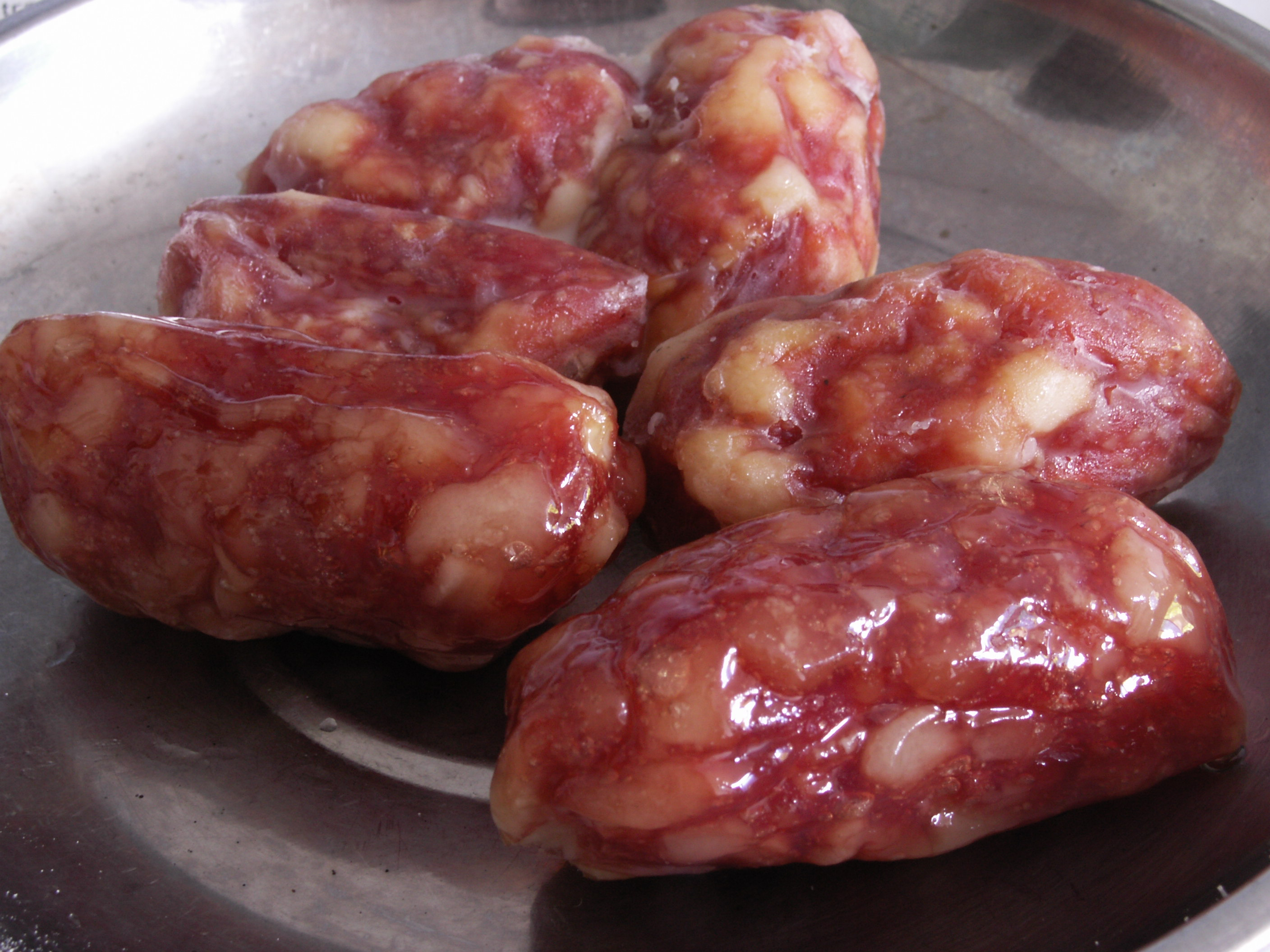
Short Cantonese Lachang

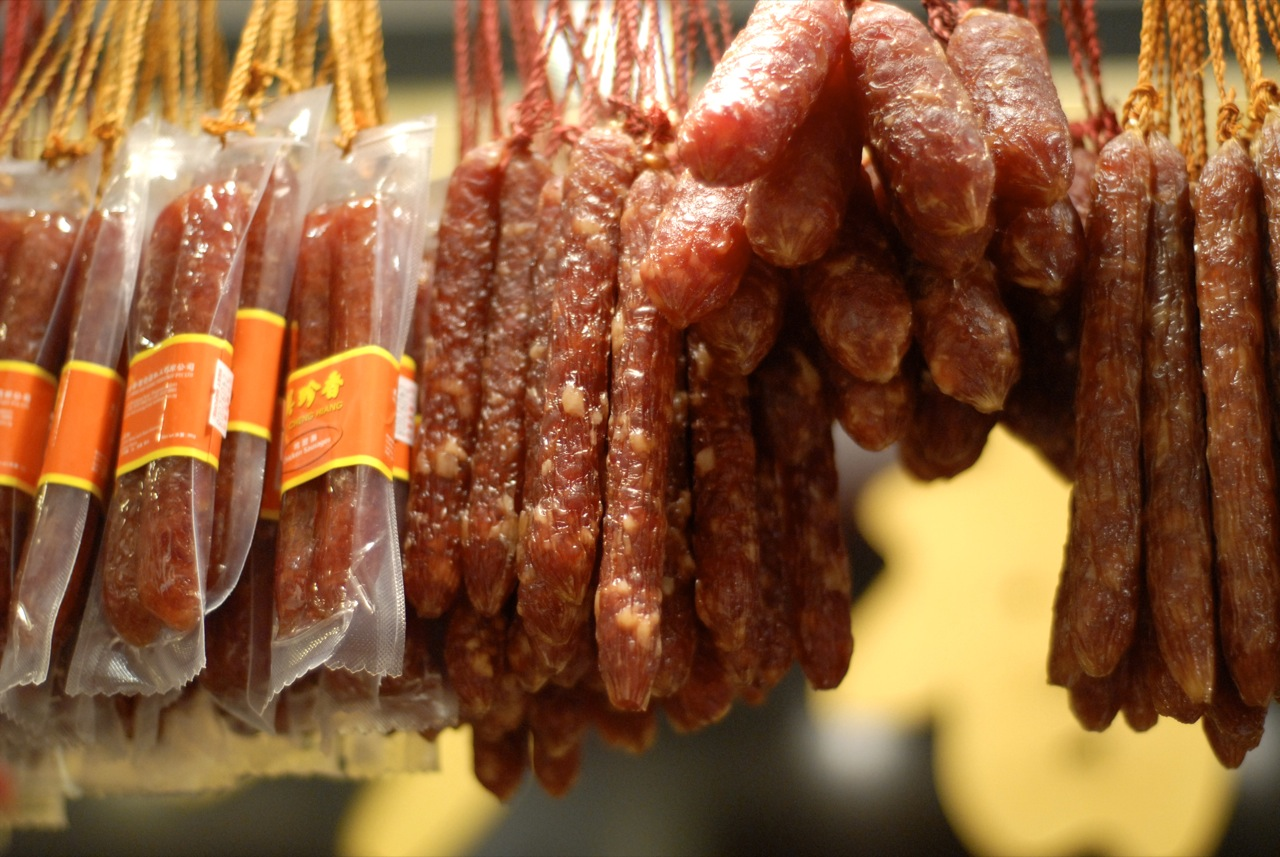
Chinese sausages drying

== See also ==
- Curing (food preservation)
- Huotuichang – a mass-produced sausage in China
- List of dried foods
- List of sausages
- List of sausage dishes
- List of smoked foods
