= 2012 in Croatian television =

List of years in Croatian television
- … 2002; 2003; 2004; 2005; 2006; 2007; 2008; 2009; 2010; 2011; 2012; 2013; 2014; 2015; 2016; 2017; 2018; 2019; 2020; 2021; 2022 …
- Art; Archaeology; Architecture; Literature; Music; Philosophy; Science; +...

This is a list of events taking place in 2012 related to Croatian television.

== Events ==
Date	Event
22 December	Video-kiosk host Barbara Radulović and her partner Robert Schubert win the seventh season of Ples sa zvijezdama.

== Debuts (including scheduled) ==
=== HRT ===
Date	Debut
2 January	In medias res on HRT 2
6 February	Rekonstrukcija Roberta Knjaza on HRT 1
7 February	Ružiona on HRT 1
2 April	Jugoslavenske tajne službe on HRT 1
3 September	Tema dana on HRT 1
5 September	Horizonti on HRT 1
10 September	Nulta točka on HRT 1
15 September	Okusi Hrvatske on Nova TV
16 September	Nedjeljom ujutro, subotom navečer on HRT 1
20 September	Spektar on HRT 1
23 September	Volim Hrvatsku on HRT 1
23 September	Damin gambit on HRT 1
2 October	Paravan on HRT 1

=== Nova TV ===
Date	Debut
27 May	Ah, taj Ivo!

=== RTL Televizija ===
Date	Debut
12 March	Survivor Srbija VIP: Costa Rica
2 April	Kuhar i pol
8 April	InDizajn s Mirjanom Mikulec on RTL 2

== Television shows ==
=== 1950s ===
Programme	Date
Plodovi zemlje	(1958–present)

=== 1960s ===
Programme	Date
Dnevnik HRT	(1968–present)

=== 1970s ===
Programme	Date
TV Kalendar	(1976–present)
Jadranske igre	(1978–1980; 2011–present)

=== 1980s ===
Programme	Date
Alpe Dunav Jadran	(1982–present)

=== 1990s ===
Programme	Date
Dobro jutro, Hrvatska	(1992–present)
Lijepom našom	(1992–present)
Mir i dobro	(1992–present)
Briljanteen	(1994–present)
Među nama	(1996–present)
More	(1997–present)
Ekumena	(1999–present)

=== 2000s ===
Programme	Date
2001
Globalno sijelo	(2001–present)
Nedjeljom u dva	(2001–present)
Normalan život	(2001–present)
2002
Na rubu znanosti	(2002–present)
Prizma	(2002–present)
Reporteri Mirjane Rakić	(2002–present)
2003
Kokice	(2003–present)
Pola ure kulture	(2003–present)
Red Carpet	(2003–2012)
2004
Otvoreno	(2004–present)
Znanstvena petica	(2010–present)
2005
Dnevnik Nove TV	(2005–present)
Trenutak spoznaje	(2005–present)
2006
Eko zona	(2006–present)
Hrvatska uživo	(2006–present)
Odmori se, zaslužio si	(2006–present)
Ples sa zvijezdama	(2006–present)
Potrošački kod	(2006–present)
2007
Drugo mišljenje	(2007–present)
Euromagazin	(2007–present)
Mijenjam svijet	(2007–2012)
Provjereno	(2007–present)
Riječ i život	(2007–present)
Večera za 5	(2007–present)
Zvijezde pjevaju	(2007–present)
2008
Astro Show	(2008–present)
Garaža	(2008–present)
Index	(2008–present)
Iza ekrana	(2008–present)
Paralele	(2008–present)
Stipe u gostima	(2008–present)
Veterani mira	(2008–present)
2009
In Magazin	(2009–present)

=== 2010s ===
Programme	Date
2010
8. kat	(2010–present)
Duhovni izazovi	(2010–present)
Exkluziv Tabloid	(2010–present)
Hrvatska kronika BiH	(2010–present)
Misija zajedno	(2010–present)
Moje rodno mjesto	(2010–present)
Ni da ni ne	(2010–present)
Peti dan	(2010–present)
RTL Danas	(2010–present)
Slika Hrvatske	(2010–present)
2011
Galileo	(2011–present)
Javne tajne	(2011–present)
Koktel	(2011–2012)
Krv nije voda	(2011–present)
Larin izbor	(2011–present)
Loza	(2011–2012)
Manjinski mozaik	(2011–present)
MasterChef Croatia	(2011–present)
Pjevaj moju pjesmu	(2011–present)
Provodi i sprovodi	(2011–2012)
Puls Hrvatske	(2011–2012)
RTL 5 do 5	(2011–present)
Ruža vjetrova	(2011–present)
Studio 45	(2011–present)
Sve u sedam	(2011–present)
Svijet profita	(2011–present)
To je Europa	(2011–2012)
U dobroj formi s Renatom Sopek	(2011–present)
Vrtlarica	(2011–present)
2012
20pet	(2012)
Ah, taj Ivo!	(2012–present)
InDizajn s Mirjanom Mikulec	(2012–present)
In medias res	(2012)
Jugoslavenske tajne službe	(2012)
Kuhar i pol	(2012)
Nedjeljom ujutro, subotom navečer	(2012–present)
Rekonstrukcija Roberta Knjaza	(2012–present)
Ružiona	(2012–present)
Survivor Srbija VIP: Costa Rica	(2012)

== Ending this year ==
Date	Programme	Channel(s)	Debut(s)
25 January	To je Europa	Croatian Radiotelevision	2011
28 January	Mijenjam svijet	Croatian Radiotelevision	2007
29 January	Loza	Croatian Radiotelevision	2011
30 January	Provodi i sprovodi	Croatian Radiotelevision	2011
1 April	Koktel	Doma TV	2011
2 June	Survivor Srbija VIP: Costa Rica	RTL Televizija	2012
4 June	Jugoslavenske tajne službe	Croatian Radiotelevision	2012
5 June	In medias res	Croatian Radiotelevision	2012
18 June	Puls Hrvatske	Croatian Radiotelevision	2011
31 August	20pet	Croatian Radiotelevision	2012
30 December	Red Carpet	Nova TV	2002

== Deaths ==
Date	Name	Age	Broadcast credibility
14 February	Zlatko Crnković	75	Actor
17 February	Milorad Bibić	59	Journalist, publicist, TV host, scriptwriter
27 February	Helga Vlahović	68	Television and radio journalist, producer
7 March	Tonka Štetić	89	Soprano singer and actress.
13 March	Josip Fišer	86	Opera singer and actor.
18 March	Ranko Mascarelli	67	Set and costume designer.
5 May	Živan Cvitković	87	Singer and movie songwriter
7 June	Slavica Radović Nadarević	47	Set and costume designer.
21 June	Bogumil Kleva	75	Actor.
23 June	Neda Bajsić	70	Actress.

== See also ==
- 2012 in Croatia
