= 2008 in Croatian television =

List of years in Croatian television
- … 1998; 1999; 2000; 2001; 2002; 2003; 2004; 2005; 2006; 2007; 2008; 2009; 2010; 2011; 2012; 2013; 2014; 2015; 2016; 2017; 2018 …
- Art; Archaeology; Architecture; Literature; Music; Philosophy; Science; +...

This is a list of Croatian television related events from 2008.

== Events ==
- 21 March - Danijela Dvornik is voted winner of Celebrity Big Brother.
- 29 September - Nova TV joined forces with TV In from Montenegro, FTV/RTRS from Bosnia and Herzegovina, A1 TV from Macedonia and B92 from Serbia to co-produce Operacija trijumf.
- 19 December - Krešimir Duvančić wins the fifth season of Big Brother.
- 20 December - The 2003 Mister Croatia Mario Valentić and his partner Ana Herceg win the third season of Ples sa zvijezdama.

== Debuts ==
- 29 September - Operacija trijumf (2008-2009)

== Television shows ==
=== 2000s ===
- Ples sa zvijezdama (2006-2013)

== Ending this year ==
- Big Brother (2004-2008, 2016–present)
- Zabranjena ljubav (2004-2008)
