= 1950s in Croatian television =

This is a list of Croatian television related events from the 1950s.

== Events ==
7 September 1956 – Public broadcaster Radiotelevizija Zagreb (RTZ)—later renamed Hrvatska radiotelevizija (HRT)—aired the gala opening of the Zagreb Fair under Television Zagreb. The opening was the first live TV broadcast of an event by RTZ.

12 May 1957 – Yugoslavia defeated Italy 6-1 in a soccer match for the 1955–1960 Central European International Cup at Stadion Maksimir, Zagreb. Broadcast at Maksimir Park, in Zagreb, Croatia, this match marked the first live television coverage of a sports event in Croatia.

== People in Croatian television ==
=== Births in the 1950s ===
- 19 July 1957 - Darko Janeš, actor.
- 7 March 1959 - Zijad Gračić, actor.

== See also ==
- Years in Croatia
- Television in Croatia: 1960s, 1970s, 1980s, 1990s
- Yugoslavia in the Eurovision Song Contest
- Independent State of Croatia (during WWII)
- List of television channels in Estonia
- 1950s in Irish television
