= Hrvatski Top Model =

- Logo for Hrvatski Top Model
- Genre: Reality television
- Created by: Tyra Banks
- Based on: America's Next Top Model by Tyra Banks
- Presented by: Tatjana Jurić (s. 1); Vanja Rupena (s. 2)
- Judges: Tatjana Jurić; Borut Mihalić; Boris Bašić; Damir Hoyka; Boris Cavlina
- Opening theme: "Get Sexy" (s. 2)
- Country of origin: Croatia
- Original language: Croatian
- No. of seasons: 2
- No. of episodes: 23

Production
- Running time: 90 minutes

Original release
- Network: RTL
- Release: 8 March 2008 – 28 November 2010

Hrvatski Top Model (English: Croatia's Top Model) is a Croatian reality television series based on Tyra Banks' America's Next Top Model. It premiered on RTL on 8 March 2008 and ran for two seasons. The show pits contestants against each other in a variety of competitions to determine the winner of the title of the new Croatian "Top Model", as well as a modelling contract with an agency in hopes of a promising career start in the modeling industry.

== Production ==
In its appearance, tasks, editing and elimination process, Hrvatski Top Model is much more similar to Germany's Next Topmodel rather than ANTM. This version has a runway walk in front of the judges, each contestant faces her verdict individually without any particular order, and its contestants travel to more than one international destination in one season. Also, a pre-recorded final show held in a TV studio where the ranking order between the final three contestants is decided, and every finalist is involved in a final runway.

=== Format ===
Croatian top model Tatjana Jurić fills the role of the host, which was performed by Tyra Banks in the original American series. She is the head of the search as well as a mentor for the 16 girls who have been chosen to live in a house together in Zagreb. Jurić and the panel of judges, which includes Borut Mihalić, Boris Bašić, Damir Hoyka, Boris Cavlina Jurić judge the girls each week. Usually one, but sometimes two girls are eliminated until only three girls are left. Croatian fashion designer Marco Grubnić had several appearances on the first season to introduce the girls to the fashion industry and give them constructive criticism.

== Cycles ==
Cycle	Premiere date	Winner	Runner-up	Other contestants in order of elimination	Number of contestants	International Destinations
1	8 March 2008	Sabina Behlić	Valentina Dropulić	Marija Šegota (quit) & Alin Horvat, Maja Majurec & Dea Frua, Neda Janus (quit), Monika Perić, Martina Bukovec, Nikolina Rešček, Julija Borovina & Kristina Šakić, Andrea Akmadžić, Marija Andrijašević, Tea Vukman, Marina Jerković	16	Paris; Milan; Innsbruck; Vienna; Munich
2	3 October 2010	Rafaela Franić	Nikolina Jurković	Ana Aračić, Monika Horvat, Deni Žižić, Kristina Petričević, Iva Pajković & Anita Vulin, Mada Peršić, Ela Arapović & Anđela Melvan, Andrea Katkić	12	Milan; Berlin; Potsdam

=== Season 1 (2008) ===
The series debuted on 8 March 2008 on RTL. After 14 weeks, Sabina Behlić was named the winner of the first season, beating Valentina Dropulić and Marina Jerković in the final.

=== Season 2 (2010) ===
Vanja Rupena was announced as the new host of the series in May 2010. The season featured twelve contestants. It premiered on 3 October 2010, and was won by Rafaela Franić.

== Reception ==
The second episode of the second season, broadcast on 10 October 2010, drew an audience of 470,000 viewers.
