= 1980s in Croatian television =

This is a list of Croatian television related events from the 1980s.

== Television shows ==
- Velo misto (1980–1981)

== New channels ==
- 1989 - HRT 3 (Z3)
- 25 May 1989 – Jabuka TV.

== Births ==
=== 1980 Births ===
- 14 March - Janko Popović Volarić, actor.
- 31 August - Mario Valentić, actor.
- 29 September - Marija Borić, actress.
- 28 December - Mislav Čavajda, actor.

=== 1981 Births ===
- 19 January - Jelena Perčin, actress.
- 18 February - Marijana Batinić, TV personality.
- 29 March - Dolores Lambaša, actress (d. 2013).
- 4 June - Mila Horvat, TV host.
- 27 June - Iva Jerković, model and TV host.
- 8 September - Ivan Vukušić, TV host.
- 27 November - Nataša Janjić, actress.
- 6 December - Marijana Mikulić, Bosnian-born actress.

=== 1982 Births ===
- 10 February - Tatjana Jurić, TV & radio host.
- 2 September - Barbara Radulović, TV host.
- 15 December - Mia Kovačić, TV host.

=== 1983 Births ===
- 21 January - Nera Stipičević, singer & actress.
- 15 May - Iva Šulentić, actress and TV & radio host.

=== 1984 births ===
- 6 march - Iva Visković, actress.
- 7 november - lana Jurčević, singer & tv host.

=== 1985 Births ===
- 13 April - Iva Mihalić, actress.
- 20 June - Mirna Medaković, actress.

=== 1989 Births ===
- 18 September - Ornela Vištica, Bosnian-born actress & model.

== See also ==
- Years in Croatia
- History of Croatia
- Television in Croatia
- 1970s in Croatian television
- 1990s in Croatian television
- List of Croatian films of the 1980s
- 1980s in Irish television
