= Franka Batelić discography =

Croatian singer discography

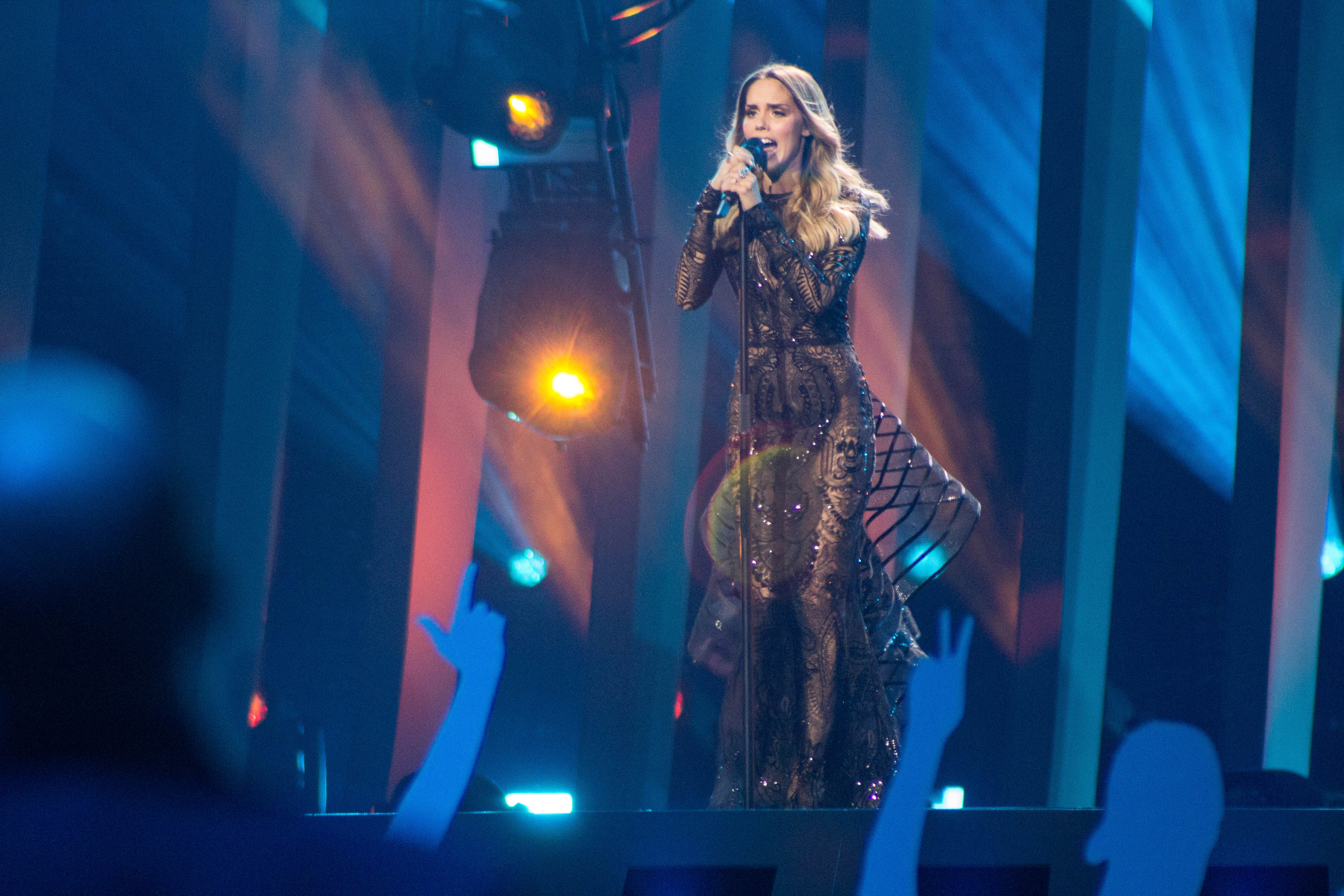
- Batelić in 2018
- Studio albums: 1
- Singles: 27
- Music videos: 20

Croatian singer Franka Batelić has released one studio album and 26 singles.

Batelić's debut studio album S tobom was released in December 2018 and peaked at number nineteen on the Top of the Shops chart in Croatia. The album's lead single "S tobom" peaked at number three on the Croatian HR Top 40 chart and spawned five additional top 10 singles. She released three stand-alone number one singles, "Sve dok sanjaš", "Samo s tobom meni Božić je" and "Bolji ljudi".

== Albums ==
=== Studio albums ===
Title	Details	Peak chart positions
Title	Details	CRO
S tobom	Released: 7 December 2018; Formats: Digital download, CD; Label: Karpo Media	19

== Singles ==
=== As lead artist ===
Title	Year	Peak chart positions	Album
Title	Year	CRO	Album
"Ovaj dan"	2007	—	Non-album single
"Ruža u kamenu"	2008	4	S tobom
"Pjesma za kraj"	2009	2	Non-album single
"Možda volim te"	2009	1	S tobom
"Moje najdraže"	2009	1	Non-album singles
"Na tvojim rukama"	2010	3	Non-album singles
"Crna duga"	2011		S tobom
"Ne!"	2011		Non-album singles
"San"	2012		Non-album singles
"Pred svima"	2012		S tobom
"Ljubav je..."	2013	19	S tobom
"S tobom"	2017	3	S tobom
"Crazy"	2018	2	S tobom
"Kao ti i ja"	2018	3	S tobom
"Ti mi nosiš sreću"	2018	2	S tobom
"Tajno"	2018	6	S tobom
"Ljubav, ništa više"	2019	2	Non-album singles
"Sve dok sanjaš"	2019	1	Non-album singles
"Samo s tobom meni Božić je" (with Igor Geržina)	2019	1	Non-album singles
"Nedodirljivi"	2020	5	S tobom
"Prvi osjećaj"	2020	2	Non-album singles
"Plan B"	2020	4	Non-album singles
"Bolji ljudi"	2021	1	Non-album singles
"Preživjet ću"	2021	6	Non-album singles
"Ova noć"	2021	9	Non-album singles
"On" (with Sara Jo)	2021	38	Non-album singles
"Zagrli me snažno"	2022	10	Non-album singles
"Priča o nama"	2022	13	Non-album singles
"Put sa poljupcima"	2023	10	Non-album singles
"Da opet nađem te" (with ToMa)	2024	5	Non-album singles
"—" denotes releases that did not chart or were not released in that territory.

=== As featured artist ===
Title	Year	Album
"Cijeli svijet" (with AliBi)	2010	Non-album single
"On Fire" (with Eric Destler)	2011	S tobom
"Run" (with Eric Destler)	2012	Non-album single

== Videography ==
=== Music videos ===
Title	Year	Director(s)	Ref.
As lead artist
"Možda volim te"	2009	Darko Drinovac	
"San"	2012	Danijel Tipura	
"Pred svima"	2012	Filip Dizdar	
"Ljubav je..."	2013	Filip Dizdar	
"S tobom"	2017	Sandra Mihaljević, Igor Ivanović	
"Crazy"	2018	Sandra Mihaljević, Igor Ivanović	
"Kao ti i ja"	2018	Sandra Mihaljević, Igor Ivanović	
"Ti mi nosiš sreću"	2018	Sandra Mihaljević, Igor Ivanović	
"Tajno"	2018	Sandra Mihaljević, Igor Ivanović	
"Ljubav, ništa više"	2019	Sandra Mihaljević, Igor Ivanović	
"Sve dok sanjaš"	2019	Sandra Mihaljević, Igor Ivanović	
"Samo s tobom meni Božić je"	2019	Sandra Mihaljević, Igor Ivanović	
"Nedodirljivi"	2020	Sandra Mihaljević, Igor Ivanović	
"Prvi osjećaj"	2020	Sandra Mihaljević, Igor Ivanović	
"Plan B"	2020	Dario Radusin	
"Bolji ljudi"	2021	Luka Sepčić	
"Preživjet ću"	2021	Nemanja Novaković	
"Ova noć"	2021	Luka Sepčić	
"On"	2021	Nemanja Novaković	
"Priča o nama"	2022	Ana Badurina, Luka Sepčić	
"Putuj sa poljupcima"	2023	Sandra Mihaljević	
"Da opet nađem te"	2024	Filip Gržinčić	
As featured artist
"Cijeli svijet"	2010	Darko Drinovac	
"On Fire"	2011	Danijel Tipura	
"Run"	2012	Danijel Tipura	
