= 1970s in Croatian television =

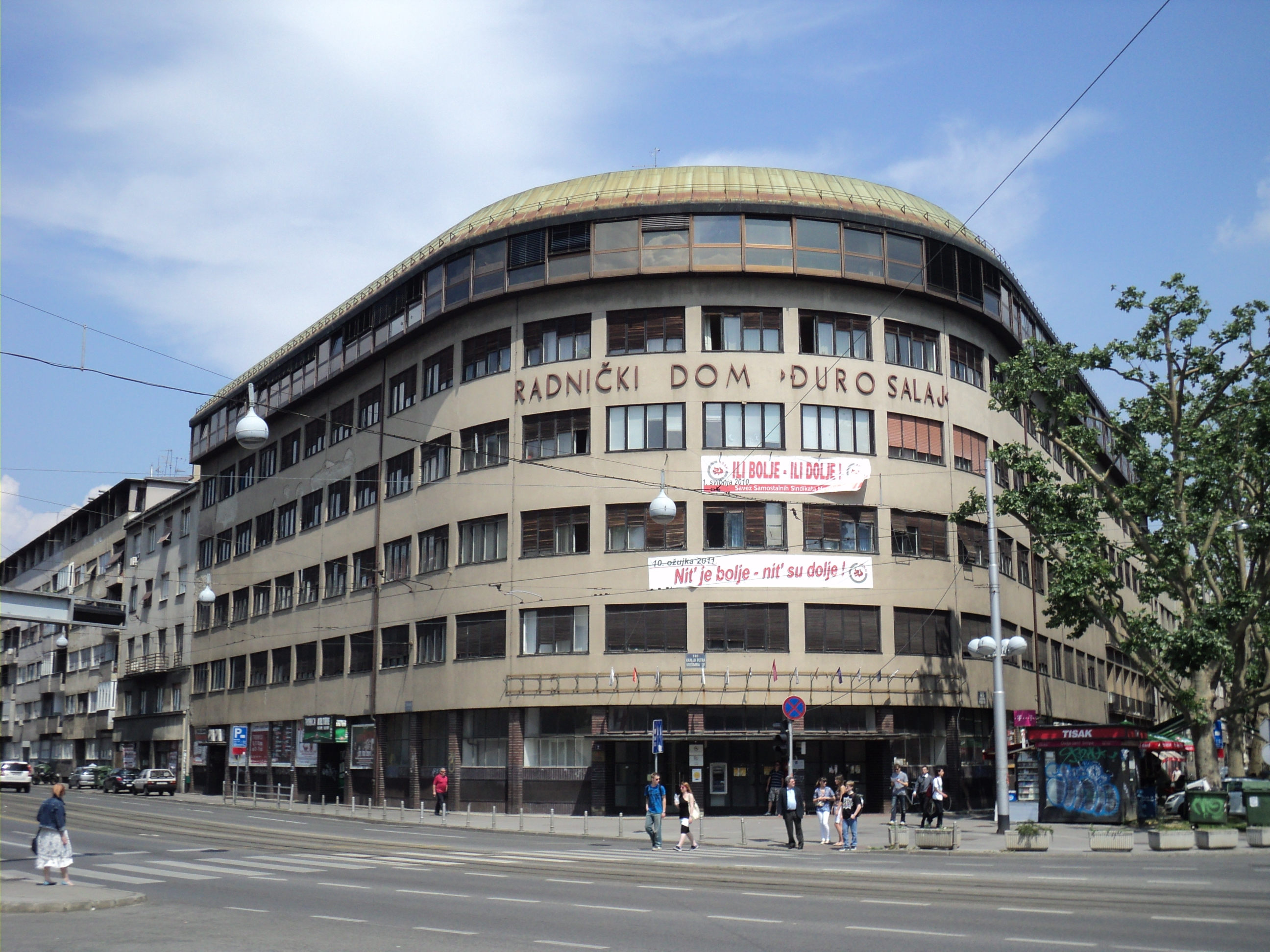
Television Zagreb set up its studio in Šubićeva Street in 1962.

This is a list of Croatian television related events from the 1970s.

== Networks and services ==
- 27 August 1972 – HRT 2 (Radiotelevizija Zagreb)

== Television shows ==
- 1975 – Gruntovčani

=== Debuts in the 1970s ===
- 3 January 1976 – TV kalendar

== 1970s births ==
=== 1970 births ===
- 22 March – Vlatka Pokos, Austrian-born television host and singer.
- 18 April – Barbara Kolar, television and radio host.
- 13 June – Mila Elegović, actress.
- 15 July – Dražen Čuček, actor.
- 26 August – Zoran Vakula, weatherman.
- 10 November – Goran Navojec, actor.

=== 1971 births ===
- 15 October – Nikša Kušelj, actor.

=== 1972 births ===
- 17 February – Bojana Gregorić, actress and television host.
- 2 March – Rene Bitorajac, actor and television host.

=== 1973 births ===
- 29 December – Damir Markovina, actor.

=== 1974 births ===
- 5 April – Sandra Bagarić, Bosnian-born opera singer and actress.

=== 1975 births ===
- 13 September – Ines Bojanić, actress.

=== 1976 births ===
- 8 April – Nikolina Pišek, actress and television host.
- 28 September – Dušan Bućan, actor and television host.

=== 1977 births ===
- 12 September – Daria Knez, actress.

=== 1978 births ===
- 9 April – Vesna Pisarović, singer and television host.
- 18 April – Vanja Rupena, model and television host.
- 16 July – Ana Vilenica, actress.

=== 1979 births ===
- 5 June – Antonija Šola, singer-songwriter and actress.
- 18 July – Zrinka Cvitešić, actress.
- 22 August – Leona Paraminski, actress and television host.
- 27 August – Ana Begić, actress.
- 4 September – Kristina Krepela, actress.
- 2 October – Antonija Blaće, television host.

== See also ==
- Years in Croatia
- Television in Croatia
- 1980s in Croatian television
- 1990s in Croatian television
- List of Croatian films of the 1970s
- 1970s in Irish television
