= Hrvatski Top Model season 1 =

Hrvatski Top Model
- Season 1

Release
- Original network: RTL
- Original release: March 3 – June 1, 2008

Season chronology
- Next → Season 2

Hrvatski Top Model Season 1 was the first Season of a reality documentary based on Tyra Banks' America's Next Top Model which pits contestants against each other in a variety of competitions to determine who will win title of the new Croatian Top Model as well as a modelling contract with an agency in hopes of a promising career start in the modeling industry.

The season was aired from April to June 2008 and hosted by Tatjana Jurić and featured sixteen contestants (originally fifteen with one being replaced by a semifinalist after she quit). Croatian Fashion Designer Marco Grubnic also had several appearances on the first Season to introduce the girls to the fashion industry and give them constructive criticism.

The winner will receive a 1-year contract with Major Model Management in Milan, a spread in the Croatian issue of Joy Magazine, a 5-day trip to New York City sponsored by Maybelline and a 2-week English course in London.

After thirteen weeks, Sabina Behlić was named the winner of the first Season beating Valentina Dropulić and Marina Jerković in the final. In 2010 the show was also shown in Slovenia on TV3 under the name Hrvaški Top Model.

== Contestants ==
(ages stated are at start of contest)

Semi-finalists

Name	Finish	Place
Antonija Skelin	Episode 1	26 (quit)
Vesna Maleš	Episode 1	25–17
Maja Marić	Episode 1	25–17
Magdalena Merdita	Episode 1	25–17
Ivona Majstorović	Episode 1	25–17
Dušanka Jančić	Episode 1	25–17
Ana Marija Doljanin	Episode 1	25–17
Ana Vinojčić	Episode 1	25–17
Aida Mešić	Episode 1	25–17

Finalists

Name	Age	Hometown	Finish	Place
Marija Šegota	17	Koprivnica	Episode 2	16 (quit)
Alin Horvat	20	Zagreb	Episode 2	15
Dea Frua	17	Split	Episode 3	14–13
Maja Majurec	22	Zagreb	Episode 3	14–13
Monika Perić	16	Zaprešić	Episode 4	12
Neda Janus	20	Virovitica	Episode 4	11 (quit)
Martina Bukovec	23	Zagreb	Episode 5	10
Nikolina Rešček	20	Zagreb	Episode 6	9
Kristina Šakić	21	Zagreb	Episode 8	8–7
Julija Borovina	18	Gornja Lomnica	Episode 8	8–7
Andrea Akmadžić	20	Osijek	Episode 10	6
Marija Andrijašević	22	Zagreb	Episode 11	5
Tea Vukman	15	Kaštel Stari	Episode 12	4
Marina Jerković	21	Trogir	Episode 13	3
Valentina Dropulić	16	Ploče	Episode 13	2
Sabina Behlić	19	Rijeka	Episode 13	1

== Summaries ==
=== Call-out order ===
Order	Episodes												
Order	1	2	3	4	5	6	8	9	10	11	12	13	
1	Marina	Julija	Monika	Kristina	Kristina	Sabina	Valentina	Marija A.	Sabina	Valentina	Sabina	Valentina	Sabina
2	Monika	Monika	Andrea	Tea	Nikolina	Valentina	Sabina	Tea	Tea	Tea	Valentina	Sabina	Valentina
3	Kristina	Sabina	Tea	Martina	Marija A.	Julija	Tea	Valentina	Valentina	Sabina	Marina	Marina	
4	Sabina	Maja	Maja	Nikolina	Andrea	Andrea	Marina	Sabina	Marina	Marina	Tea		
5	Valentina	Marija Š.	Nikolina	Marija A.	Valentina	Tea	Andrea	Andrea	Andrea	Marija A.			
6	Marija Š.	Valentina	Martina	Sabina	Sabina	Marina	Julija	Marina	Marija A.				
7	Neda	Kristina	Neda	Marina	Julija	Marija A.	Marija A.						
8	Maja	Neda	Marija A.	Monika	Marina	Kristina	Kristina						
9	Julija	Marina	Sabina	Julija	Tea	Nikolina							
10	Dea	Alin	Julija	Andrea	Martina								
11	Martina	Dea	Marina	Valentina									
12	Nikolina	Martina	Dea	Neda									
13	Marija A.	Marija A.	Valentina										
14	Tea	Tea	Kristina										
15	Alin	Nikolina											

The contestant quit the competition
The contestant was eliminated
The contestant was the original eliminee but was saved
The contestant won the competition

- In Episode 1, 24 semi-finalists were chosen out of 4,000 applicants the 24 semifinalists where chosen.
- In Episode 2, 15 girls that would move on in the main competition were chosen. Marija decided to quit the competition. She was replaced by Andrea the following episode.
- In Episode 4, Neda decided to quit the competition.
- Episode 7 was the recap Episode.
- The judging for episode 8 was prolonged into the beginning of the following episode. Kristina's exit was shown in episode 9.
- Nobody was eliminated in episode 9.

=== Photo shoot guide ===
- Episode 2 photo shoot: Wind tunnel
- Episode 3 photo shoot: Snow editorial for Joy
- Episode 4 photo shoot: Water photo shoot
- Episode 5 photo shoot: Summer and winter
- Episode 6 photo shoot: Vogue dance
- Episode 7 photo shoot: Auto show
- Episode 8 photo shoot: Posing with snakes
- Episode 9 photo shoot: Diamonds are a girl's best friend
- Episode 10 photo shoots: Wildlife; B&W lookbook
- Episode 11 photo shoot: Body painting
- Episode 12 photo shoot: Painter, cat woman and Dita Von Teese
