= Zakon ljubavi =

Croatian telenovela

- Created by: Roman Majetić; Nikola Ivanda
- Starring: Vanessa Radman; Lucija Šesto; Petar Ćiritović; Zijad Gračić; Ankica Dobrić; Massimo Dobrovic; Ivica Pucar; Marija Omaljev-Grbić; Filip Juričić; Helena Minić; Dolores Lambaša
- Country of origin: Croatia
- Original language: Croatian
- No. of episodes: 73 (filmed), 60 (screened)

Production
- Running time: 45 min
- Production company: AVA

Original release
- Network: Nova TV (Croatia only); FTV, RTRS (Bosnia and Herzegovina only); POP TV (Slovenia); RTV Pink (Serbia)
- Release: 22 September – 12 December 2008

Zakon ljubavi (translated to The law of love) is a Croatian telenovela that began airing on 22 September 2008 on Nova TV. The series was created by Roman Majetić and Nikola Ivanda, with the story written by Jelena Veljača and Nataša Antulov. It was the first telenovela produced by AVA Production to be broadcast on Nove TV.

== Story ==
The series follows two completely different parallel worlds. First, we are introduced to a group of young adults who share a villa owned by the Perković family. Eighteen-year-old Klara Bakić has just arrived in Zagreb to attend an audition for the Academy of Dramatic Arts. On her way to the faculty, she becomes involved in a car accident, which Ivor and Domagoj (part of Zagreb's elite youth) try to conceal. However, sparks immediately fly between Klara and Domagoj.

Zagreb's acting world is contrasted with its legal world, specifically the world of the law firm "Perković, Nardelli and Partners." The two main families are connected through the marriage of Petar Perković and Maja Lena Nardelli Perković. Maja Lena is an extremely successful young lawyer who became a partner at the law firm founded by Petar's father, Zvonimir, the most famous lawyer in Zagreb with political and social connections, though his morals are questionable. Petar and Maja Lena are successful in their respective fields of law, and their marriage appears perfect from the outside. However, in reality, Petar is hiding an affair with the acting diva Lucija Nardelli, who is married to Maja Lena's brother, theatre director Matej Nardelli.

Maja Lena quickly uncovers Petar's infidelity and throws him out of the family villa, renting it to a group of student-actors as an act of revenge. She bets on their frequent parties and anticipated financial problems, knowing that Petar is sensitive to such matters. In addition to the new flatmates Ivor, Kare, and Domagoj, the house is also home to Una Perković, Petar's younger sister, who is unhappy after failing her exams at the Academy of Dramatic Arts. She does everything in her power to make Klara's stay in the villa difficult. Furthermore, driven by her aspirations, Una enters into a relationship with Matej in order to use him. Stella, Maja Lena's young assistant at the Perković law firm, also lives in the villa. On the outside, she appears to be a calm young lady, but in reality, she is a skilled manipulator who, along with the mysterious Andrej, secretly investigates the Perković law firm.

== Characters ==
=== Perković Family ===
- Zvonimir Perković – A rich, ambitious, and controlling 50-year-old; father of Una and Petar.
- Neva Perković – A lonely, alcoholic mother who has been forgotten by everyone.
- Petar Perković – Zvonimir's son. A lazy womanizer who is cheating on his wife, Maja Lena, with Lucija.
- Una Perković – A rich and arrogant teenager; a former model and an aspiring successful actress.

=== Nardelli Family ===
- Ignjat Nardelli – A wealthy 50-year-old who is in a significant conflict with Zvonimir.
- Alma Sach Nardelli – Mother of Maja Lena and Matej; a successful architect.
- Maja Lena Nardelli – A good but deceitful woman; a successful lawyer at Zvonimir's law firm; has a brief romance with Ivor.
- Matej Nardelli – A lecturer at the Academy of Dramatic Arts; his wife, Lucija, is cheating on him with Petar.
- Lucija Nardelli – Matej's arrogant wife; untrustworthy and ungrateful; has been acting since her 20s.

=== Other characters ===
- Domagoj Rebac – A young man searching for a soulmate; in love with Klara and a former drug dealer.
- Ivor Vilić – A typical 20-year-old; loves gorgeous women, fun, and excitement; has a romance with Maja Lena.
- Klara Bakić – A good, young woman who strives to gain acceptance at the Academy of Dramatic Arts; her potential sparks jealousy in Una, who refuses Klara's attempts at friendship.
- Tonka – Zvonimir's law firm secretary and Maja Lena's best friend, who shares all her secrets.
- Stella – An employee at Zvonimir's firm; young and somewhat inexperienced; has a romance with Andrej.
- Andrej – Stella's boyfriend, who is determined to learn all about Maja Lena.
- Peter Tadic – From out of town and seems intent on causing trouble at Zvonimir's law firm.

== Trivia ==
- On the premiere day of the telenovela Zakon Ljubavi, the competing Channel HRT also launched another Croatian telenovela, Sve će biti dobro. Although both telenovelas maintained stable ratings from the start, after the first month of airing, viewers began to favor HRT's telenovela, according to viewer ratings published in Jutarnji list. Sve će biti dobro attracted 12% of viewers daily, while Zakon Ljubavi only garnered 6%.
- Marijana Mikulić, portraying the character Zrinka Kramarić, is a former singer who is in the process of divorcing her partner after he discovers her infidelity and throws her clothes out of their city apartment. This event in the series bears a striking resemblance to the real-life case of singer Vlatka Pokos. Although author Jelena Veljača denied that the events in the telenovela were inspired by Vlatka's divorce, Vlatka Pokos became quite upset with Jelena, convinced that her situation was portrayed in detail in the telenovela.
- In October 2008, Roman Majetić terminated one of the main writers, Jelenu Veljaču, citing a breach of contractual obligations. She was replaced by Serbian writer Nataša Drakulić.
- Nova TV (Croatia) decided to stop airing the telenovela Zakon Ljubavi after 60 episodes due to low ratings. The series was replaced by reruns of the comedy series Bumerang.

== Actors ==
=== Main cast ===
Actor	Character
Vanessa Radman	Maja Lena Nardelli
Petar Ćiritović	Matej Nardelli
Zijad Gračić	Zvonimir Perković
Lucija Šesto	Klara Bakić
Filip Juričić	Domagoj Rebac
Ankica Dobrić	Neva Perković
Ivica Pucar	Petar Perković
Marija Omaljev-Grbić	Una Perković
Slavko Juraga	Ignjat Nardelli
Massimo Dobrovic	Peter Tadic
Jasna Odorčić	Alma Sach Nardelli
Mario Mlinarić	Ivor Vilić
Dolores Lambaša	Lucija Nardelli
Helena Minić	Tonka Njavro
Danijela Stanić Sejdinović	Stella
Vladimir Tintor	Andrej Žerjavić
Maja Petrin	Korina
Bojana Ordinačev	Iris Vujičić
Ranko Zidarić	Fran Tadej
Ivana Bolanča	Olinka Tadej
