= Dojkić =

Dojkić is a South Slavic surname. Notable people with the surname include:

- Andrej Dojkić (born 1980), Croatian actor
- Bojan Dojkić (born 1984), Serbian footballer
- Ivana Dojkić (born 1997), Croatian basketball player
