= Tajne (TV series) =

- The title card for the series
- Genre: Telenovela
- Created by: Vlado Bulić; Morena Foretić
- Directed by: Tanja Golić; Dario Pleić; Goran Rukavina; Ivan Šarić
- Starring: Jelena Jovanova; Filip Juričić
- Country of origin: Croatia
- Original language: Croatian
- No. of seasons: 1
- No. of episodes: 140

Production
- Producers: Ana Balentović; Ana Habajec; David Kapac
- Production company: Fremantle Media Hrvatska

Original release
- Network: RTL
- Release: 16 September 2013 – 15 May 2014

Tajne ("Secrets") is a Croatian telenovela created by Vlado Bulić and Morena Foretić. The series sees lead roles portrayed by Jelena Jovanova and Filip Juričić, who play two young people that fall in love as they go through a series of intrigues and hidden secrets to find the truth about themselves and their families.

The series ran from 16 September 2013 to 15 May 2014 on RTL. A total of 140 episodes has been released. The series is produced by Fremantle Media Hrvatska.

== Plot ==
The orphanage where Marina Franić (Jelena Jovanova) grew up is currently in financial trouble, which is why she decides to return to her father's estate, which belongs to her by inheritance. She is forced to seek help from her uncle Ivan (Aleksandar Cvjetković), who has since bought the manor house with the Šeper family's stolen treasure and opened a hotel in it. Ivan is still tormented by remorse for the murder of Marina's father, but also for the fact that he allowed his wife Brigita (Ksenija Pajić) to send her niece to the orphanage. Therefore, she decides to help Marina and allow her to come live with the children from the orphanage to the manor house. Nikola (Filip Juričić), who has since become a police inspector, also visits the manor house, determined to find out the truth about his mother's death under a false identity. Over time, Nikola and Marina's life paths will intertwine again, and the secrets of the two families will begin to be revealed.

== Cast ==
=== Main cast ===
- Jelena Jovanova as Marina (Franić) Kovač
- Filip Juričić as Nikola (Šeper) Kovač
- Monika Mihajlović as Barbara Franić
- Ksenija Pajić as Brigita (Franić) Rosso
- Aleksandar Cvjetković as Ivan Franić
- Stjepan Perić as Filip Petrić
- Jasna Bilušić as Višnja Petrić
- Mladen Čutura as Miro Petrić
- Mladen Kovačić as Sebastijan
- Katarina Baban as Valentina
- Amar Selimović as Robert Tomić
- Mirta Zečević as Lada Franić

=== Supporting cast ===
- Vinko Kraljević as Jerko Kovač
- Iskra Jirsak as Nena
- Nada Gačešić-Livaković as Ankica Đurinec
- Vanja Čirjak as Josipa Tomić
- Leona Paraminski as Ana Jakelić
- Aleksandar Srećković as Damjan Rosso
