= Maja Petrin =

Croatian actress

- Born: 3 July 1972; Zagreb, SFR Yugoslavia
- Died: 4 March 2014 (aged 41); Zagreb, Croatia
- Occupation: Actress
- Years active: 1993–2014

Maja Petrin (3 July 1972 – 4 March 2014) was a Croatian actress.

== Death ==
Maja Petrin was born in Zagreb, and died suddenly at her home in Zagreb from heart failure on 4 March 2014, aged 41.

== Filmography ==
=== Television roles ===
- Stipe u gostima as Ivona (2012)
- Pod sretnom zvijezdom as Biba (2011)
- Zakon ljubavi as Korina Lovrić (2008)
- Zabranjena ljubav as Dunja Barišić (2006-2008)
- Hitna 94 as Sonja Šimić (2008)
- Ponos Ratkajevih as Irina Aleksandar (2007)
- Villa Maria as Zora Rački (2004-2005)
- Obiteljska stvar as Sanja (1998)
