= Jelena Jovanova =

Macedonian actress (born 1984)

Jelena Jovanova Perić
- Јелена Јованова Периќ
- Born: Jelena Jovanova; 21 October 1984 (age 41); Banja Luka, SR Bosnia and Herzegovina, Yugoslavia
- Citizenship: Macedonian; Croatian
- Education: Faculty of Dramatic Arts in Skopje
- Occupation: Actress
- Years active: 2004–present
- Spouse: Stjepan Perić (m. 2015)
- Children: 2

Jelena Jovanova Perić (Macedonian: Јелена Јованова Периќ; born 21 October 1984) is a Macedonian actress.

== Biography ==
Jelena Jovanova was born in SR Bosnia and Herzegovina to a Macedonian father from Štip and a Bosnian Serb mother from Prijedor. She was raised in North Macedonia and graduated from The Faculty of Dramatic Arts in Skopje. Member of Macedonian National Theater since 2006, she has featured in various large productions at the theater since.

== Career ==
Her big screen debut was in Juanita Wilson's As If I Am Not There, which has been selected as the Irish entry for the Best Foreign Language Film at the 84th Academy Awards.

In 2010, she was cast in Angelina Jolie's directorial debut In the Land of Blood and Honey, nominated for Best Foreign Language Film at the 69th Golden Globe Awards.

== Personal life ==
She is married to Stjepan Perić, and they have two children.

== Filmography ==
- As If I Am Not There (2010)
- In the Land of Blood and Honey (2011)
- The Third Half (2012)
- Skopje Remix (2012)
- Ckopa (2015)
- The Constitution (2016)
- Child (2016)
- Iron Story (2017)
- Hey! (2018)
- The Witch Hunters (2018)
- Black and White (2018)
- El Desentierro (2018)
- Willow (2019)
- Homo (2020)

== Television ==
- Tajne as Marina Franić (2013–2014)
- Whichever Way the Ball Bounces as Nadalija (2015)
- Prespav as Jelena (2016–2021)
- In Treatment (Na terapija) as Milena (2017)
- Insajder as Iskra (2017)
- Pagan Peak as Ivana (2019)

== Selected Stage Roles ==
- Chicago as Roxie Hart
- Who's Afraid of Virginia Woolf? as Honey
- Push Up 1-3 as Sabine
- Troilus and Cressida as Helen of Troy
- Twig in the Wind as Magda
- Hasanaginica as Hasanaginica
- Sexual Perversity in Chicago as Deborah
- A Clockwork Orange as Alex
- The Decameron as Filomena
- Dundo Maroje as Petrunjela
- Don Quixote as Dulcinea
- Class Enemy as Iron
- Miss Julie as Miss Julie
