= 1984 in Croatian television =

This is a list of Croatian television related events from 1984.

== Births ==
- 6 March - Iva Visković, actress
- 7 November - Lana Jurčević, singer & TV host
