= Možda volim te =

Single by Franka Batelić

from the album S tobom
- Released: March 9, 2009
- Recorded: 2009
- Genre: Pop
- Length: 3:02
- Label: Hit Records

Franka Batelić singles chronology
"Pjesma za kraj" (2009)	"Možda volim te" (2009)	"Moje najdraže" (2009)

Music video
- Možda volim te on YouTube

"Možda volim te" (English translation: Maybe I love you) is a pop song and the fourth single by the Croatian singer Franka Batelić, recorded for the Croatian selection for the Croatian Radio Festival.

== Music video and promotion ==
Batelić dancing in the video

The music video was directed by Darko Drinovac and was filmed on June 7, 2009. It premiered on Nova TV in the show Red Carpet on June 14, and on YouTube on June 15.

In the video Batelić is dancing with her friends and she's flirting with a guy.

Batelić performed the song and on an episode of the Croatian show Z1 on May 22, 2009.

== Chart performance ==
"Možda volim te" was her first number one single in Croatia, the song was on the top for eleven consecutive weeks.

== Track listing ==
Croatian Airplay Single

1. "Možda volim te" – 3:02

Croatian Maxi Promo Single

1. "Možda volim te (Radio Version)" – 3:02
2. "Možda volim te (Club remix)" – 3:32
3. "Možda volim te (Instrumental)" – 3:02
4. "Ruža u kamenu (Eric Destler club remix)" – 4:54

== See also ==
- Croatia in the Eurovision Song Contest
- Croatia in the Eurovision Song Contest 2009
- HRT Dora
