= Nada Rocco =

Croatian actress (born 1947)

- Born: September 15, 1947 (age 77); Zagreb, PR Croatia, FPR Yugoslavia
- Occupation: Actress
- Years active: 1961–present

Nada Rocco (born 15 September 1947) is a Croatian actress.

== Filmography ==
=== Television roles ===
Film
Year	Title	Role	Notes
1974	U registraturi	Barica	Main cast
1990-1991	The Little Flying Bears	Various characters	Main cast
2004-2008	Zabranjena ljubav	Nada Horvat Barić	Main cast
2010	Najbolje godine	Višnja	Guest star
2011-2012	Stipe u gostima	Uršula #2	Main cast (s4)
2012	Larin izbor	Alma	Guest star
2014	Zora dubrovačka	Midwife	Guest star
2014	Celebrity MasterChef Croatia	Herself	Season 1
2015–present	Nadine strasti	Herself	Web cooking show

=== Movie roles ===
Film
Year	Title	Role	Notes
1973	So	Duška	
1973	Diogeneš	/	TV film
1986	Čudesna šuma	Lija Lili	
1990	Čarobnjakov šešir	Kraljica Sunčica	
