= For Good Old Times =

2018 film

- Directed by: Eduard Galić
- Starring: Marko Petrić; Karlo Mrkša
- Release date: 18 July 2018 (PFF)
- Running time: 105 minutes
- Country: Croatia
- Language: Croatian

For Good Old Times (Croatian: Za ona dobra stara vremena) is a 2018 Croatian comedy film directed by Eduard Galić.

== Cast ==
- Marko Petrić - Hrvoje
- Karlo Mrkša - Borna
- Zijad Gračić - Mirko
- Ksenija Pajić - Milka
