= History of Dutch television =

The history of Dutch television is linked with Philips. The first Dutch experiments with television took place around the 1930s. Television pioneer Erik de Vries, employed by the scientific lab from Philips, built and experimented with the first transmitter. The first broadcast took place in 1930 from the little tower in the Amsterdam Carlton Hotel. The first person on television was the daughter of Koos Speenhoff. She worked at the Phillips administration office, but was chosen to act as a host for an experimental broadcast in 1935.

Philips built four vehicles in 1937–1938, two transmitting vehicles and two technical vehicles with film scanners and mobile TV cameras. The first caravan of vehicles was ready and showed at the Jaarbeurs Utrecht in 1938. After that, Erik de Vries gave demonstrations in several countries, including 1939 demonstration in Zagreb.

Between 1948 and 1951 Philips did 264 experimental broadcasts led by Erik de Vries. They were received by hundreds of receivers placed in Eindhoven mostly in possession of Philips employees.
