= Filip Juričić =

Croatian actor (born 1981)

- Born: 18 April 1981 (age 44); Zagreb, SR Croatia, SFR Yugoslavia
- Occupation: Actor
- Years active: 2003–present
- Height: 6 ft (183 cm)
- Children: 2

Filip Juričić (born April 18, 1981) is a Croatian actor.

== Career ==
Juričić graduated from the Academy of Dramatic Art, University of Zagreb. During his studies, he gave an award-winning performance in the cult classic Exit play Kako misliš mene nema? with Amar Bukvić. In 2004, he won a Croatian Actor Award for Best Actor Under 28 for his performance in the drama U noći.

In 2002, he starred in an adaptation of Don Juan at the Croatian National Theatre in Zagreb. He actively performed in plays produced by the Kufer Theatre, the Agram Theatre, the Žar Ptica Theatre, the Histrion Acting Troupe, the Kerempuh Satirical Theatre, the National Theatre in Rijeka, the Virovitica Theatre, the Knapp Acting House, the Velika Gorica Theatre and Teatar ITD.

Since April 2014, he is a permanent member of the Komedija Theatre in Zagreb. He appeared in over twenty productions, including Revizor, The Legend of Saint Muhle and Dangerous Relations. In a coproduction between Komedija and the Croatian National Theatre in Varaždin, he gave a critically acclaimed performance as William Shakespeare in the rendition of Shakespeare in Love. For his portrayal of Petruchio in the Komedija Theatre's adaptation of The Taming of the Shrew, Juričić won the 2014 Fabijan Šovagović Award for Best Actor in a Play.

On screen, he is known for his television career and his starring roles in In Silence (2006) and The Show Must Go On (2010). For his role in the latter, he was nominated for a Golden Arena for Best Supporting Actor. His other film roles include appearances in Here (2003) and Sex, Drink and Bloodshed (2004). On television, he was prominently featured in numerous ensemble casts as Marko Marušić in Ljubav u zaleđu (2005–2006), Domagoj Rebac in Zakon ljubavi (2008), Dinko Bilić in Larin izbor (2011–2013), Nikola Šeper in Tajne (2013–2014), which embarked commercial acclaim, making Filip Juričić a household name. He is currently starring in the televised comedies Na granici (2018–2019) as Marko Lasić and Tate (2020) as Petar Malbaša. His role in the latter made him a sex symbol in Serbia.

He also made guest and recurring appearances in Naša mala klinika, Zakon!, Kad zvoni?, Zauvijek susjedi and Čista ljubav. For his guest role in Zauvijek susjedi, he was nominated for a Poseidon Award at the Dalmatia Culture Festival for Outstanding Performance in a Television Comedy. He won the award in 2012 for his lead role in the television film based on Larin izbor, Larin izbor: Izgubljeni princ, co-starring with Doris Pinčić and Ivan Herceg.

His voice acting credits range from radio dramas to Croatian-language versions of animated feature films and motion pictures. His roles in the latter include Donatello in the Teenage Mutant Ninja Turtles (2007), Mayor Ned McDodd in Horton Hears a Who! (2008), Master Monkey in the Kung Fu Panda film series (2008–2016), Flint Lockwood in Cloudy with a Chance of Meatballs (2009) and Cloudy with a Chance of Meatballs 2 (2013), Pedro in Rio (2011) and Rio 2 (2014), Turley in Rango (2011) and the title character in Paddington (2014) and Paddington 2 (2017). Among his hundred characters, he cites his role as Bugsy from the 2005 feature Valiant (originally voiced by Ricky Gervais) as his favourite voice role.

== Filmography ==
=== Television roles ===
Film
Year	Title	Role	Notes
2005	Kad zvoni?	Dudo	Guest star
2005–2006	Ljubav u zaleđu	Marko Marušić	Main cast
2006	Naša mala klinika	Smerducci's lawyer	Guest star
2007	Zauvijek susjedi	Zoran	Guest star
2008	Zakon ljubavi	Domagoj Rebac	Main cast
2009	Baza Djeda Mraza	Ted Vraz	Christmas Television Special
2010	Stipe u gostima	Instructor	Guest star
2011–2013	Larin izbor	Dinko Bilić	Main cast
2013–2014	Tajne	Nikola Šeper	Main cast
2014–2015	Vatre ivanjske	Dr. Andrija Turina	Main cast
2016–2017	Prava žena	Nikola Bogdan	Main cast
2018	Čista ljubav	Markus Pašalić	Guest star
2018–2019	Na granici	Marko Lasić	Main cast
2019	Crno-bijeli svijet	Skeljo	Guest star
2018–2020	Novine	Karlo Mihalić	Guest star
2020	Der Kroatien Krimi	Ivica	Guest star
2020	Tate	Petar Malbaša #1	Main cast
2021	Bogu iza nogu	Đuro Janjić	Main cast

=== Movie roles ===
Film
Year	Title	Role	Notes
2003	Tu	Salesman	
2004	Sex, piće i krvoproliće	Bad Blue Boy	
2006	U tišini	Tomica	
2010	The Show Must Go On	Daniel	
2012	Umbrella	Ivan	
2012	Larin izbor:Izgubljeni princ	Dinko Bilić / Viktor Morlaci	

=== Croatian voice over dubs ===
Year	Film/Show	Role
2003	Spider-Man	Green Goblin
2004	Scooby-Doo	Colin Haggart
2004	Shark Tale	Giuseppe and Prawn Shop Owner
2005	Racing Stripes	Stripes
2005	Valiant	Bugsy
2005	A.T.O.M.	Ollie Herbert
2005-2018	Futurama	Bender
2007	Teenage Mutant Ninja Turtles	Donatello
2007	Bee Movie	Jackson
2008	Horton Hears a Who!	Mayor Nedd McDodd
2008	Kung Fu Panda	Master Monkey
2008	Bolt	White Cat
2009	Cloudy with a Chance of Meatballs	Flint Lockwood
2009	Johnny Test	Duky
2010	Toy Story 3	Buttercup
2010	MetaJets	Trey Jordan
2011	Rango	Turley
2011	Rio	Pedro
2011	Kung Fu Panda 2	Master Monkey
2011-2018	Adventure Time	Jake the Dog
2012	The Lorax	The Once-ler
2012	Zambezia	Ezee
2013	Cloudy with a Chance of Meatballs 2	Flint Lockwood
2013	Walking with Dinosaurs	Patchi
2013	Tarzan	William Clayton
2014	Rio 2	Pedro
2014	Paddington Bear	Paddington
2016	Norm of the North	Caribou
2016	Ratchet and Clank	Brax
2016	Kung Fu Panda 3	Master Monkey
2017	Paddington Bear 2	Paddington
2020	Soul	Joe Gardner
2021	Extinct	Ed
