= Katija Zubčić =

Croatian actress (born 1952)

- Born: 15 December 1952 (age 72); Ražanac, PR Croatia, FPR Yugoslavia
- Occupation: Actress
- Years active: 1978–present

Katija Zubčić (born 15 December 1952) is a Croatian actress.

== Filmography ==
=== Television roles ===
Film
Year	Title	Role	Notes
1982	Nepokoreni grad	/	Guest star
2004-2007	Zabranjena ljubav	Lidija Bauer-Novak	Main cast
2007	Obični ljudi	Marija	Guest star
2013	Počivali u miru	Marija Rukavina	Guest star

=== Movie roles ===
Film
Year	Title	Role	Notes
1983	Čovjek od riječi	/	TV film
1983	Hildegard	Ankica Vidaković	TV film
1985	Od petka do petka	/	
1995	Posebna vožnja	/	TV film
