= Vanessa Radman =

Croatian actress (born 1974)

- Born: 1974 (age 50–51); Križevci, SR Croatia, SFR Yugoslavia
- Occupation: Actress
- Years active: 2001–present
- Spouse: Tim Panne (divorced)

Vanessa Radman (born 1974) is a Croatian actress.

== Biography ==
Vanessa Radman was born in 1974 in Križevci. As a high school student she moved with her parents and sister Maša to the German city Wuppertal.

She is well known for her roles in Obični ljudi, Ponos Ratkajevih and Zora dubrovačka. Radman also had some appearances in German films and series. She is 5 ft 6 1/2 in (1.689 m) high. She speaks Croatian and German well.

She was married to Tim Panne, but they are divorced.

== Filmography ==
=== Movie roles ===
Year	Title	Role	Notes
2012	Kleine Morde	demonstrator	
2012	Die Braut im Schnee	Gabriele Hasler	
2010	Max Schmeling	Mrs. Damski	
2009	Wallace Line	supplier	
2007	Absolution	Lena	
2007	Gegenüber	Jessy	

=== Television roles ===
Year	Title	Role	Notes
2015	Verbotene Liebe	Alma Müller	Guest star
2013	Zora dubrovačka	Maris Menčetić-Knego	Main cast
2013	Leipzig Homicide	Ruslana Sadur	Guest star
2013	Sinđelići	Dobrila "Lila" Sinđelć	Main cast (only in pilot, role was recast)
2011	Pod sretnom zvijezdom	Sibila Vidić	Guest star
2010	Der letzte Bulle	Irina Nazaref	Guest star
2010	Šesto čulo	Lucija Skoko	Guest star
2009	Ples sa zvijezdama	Herself	Contestant - Celebrity
2008	Zakon Ljubavi	Maja Lena Nardelli	Main cast
2007–2008	Ponos Ratkajevih	Elisabeth "Lisa" Cohen	Main cast
2006–2007	Obični ljudi	Vanja Kincl	Main cast
2006	Cologne P.D.	Kerstin Reuter	Guest star
2005	Ein Fall für zwei	Boljana	Guest star
2005	Leipzig Homicide	Martina Scholz	Guest star
2001	Alarm für Cobra 11 – Die Autobahnpolizei	lover	Guest star
2001	Der Fahnder	Elena	Guest star
