= Pjesma za kraj =

Single by Franka Batelić

from the album Franka
- Released: 20 January 2009
- Recorded: 2009
- Genre: Pop
- Length: 3:15
- Label: Hit Records
- Songwriters: Boris Đurđević; Miro Buljan; Nenad Ninčević

Franka Batelić singles chronology
"Ruža u kamenu" (2009)	"Pjesma za kraj" (2009)	"Možda volim te" (2009)

"Pjesma za kraj" (English translation: Song for the end) is a pop song by the Croatian singer Franka Batelić, recorded for the Croatian selection for the Eurovision Song Contest 2009. It finished the 7th with a total of 18 points won.

== HRT Dora 2009 ==
With "Pjesma za kraj" Franka Batelić took part in the Croatian selection for the Eurovision Song Contest 2009, and she was qualified directly into the finals. The final event of Dora 2009 was held on 29 February 2009, and sixteen contestants took part in; Batelić performed the seventh. Her songs received only four points from the jury and 14 points from the votes, and finished the 7th with a total of 18 points.

== Track listing ==
Croatian Airplay Single

1. "Pjesma za kraj" – 3:15

== See also ==
- Croatia in the Eurovision Song Contest
- Croatia in the Eurovision Song Contest 2009
- HRT Dora
