= 2007 in Croatian television =

This is a list of Croatian television related events from 2007.

== Events ==
- 20 January - Konjanik actress Zrinka Cvitešić and her partner Nicolas Quesnoit win the first season of Ples sa zvijezdama.
- 21 December - Vedran Lovrenčić wins the fourth season of Big Brother.
- 22 December - Singer Luka Nižetić and his partner Mirjana Žutić win the second season of Ples sa zvijezdama.

== Television shows ==
=== 2000s ===
- Big Brother (2004-2008, 2016–present)
- Zabranjena ljubav (2004-2008)
- Ples sa zvijezdama (2006-2013)
