= Laudato TV =

Croatian TV station

Laudato TV is a Croatian local television station based in Zagreb (with studio in Split also). Television started its broadcasting at Christmas 2015. It was the most-viewed local television in Croatia in 2019.

It collaborates with EWTN and other Christian televisions.

== See also ==
- Catholic television
- Catholic television channels
- Catholic television networks
