= Croatian Regulatory Authority for Network Industries =

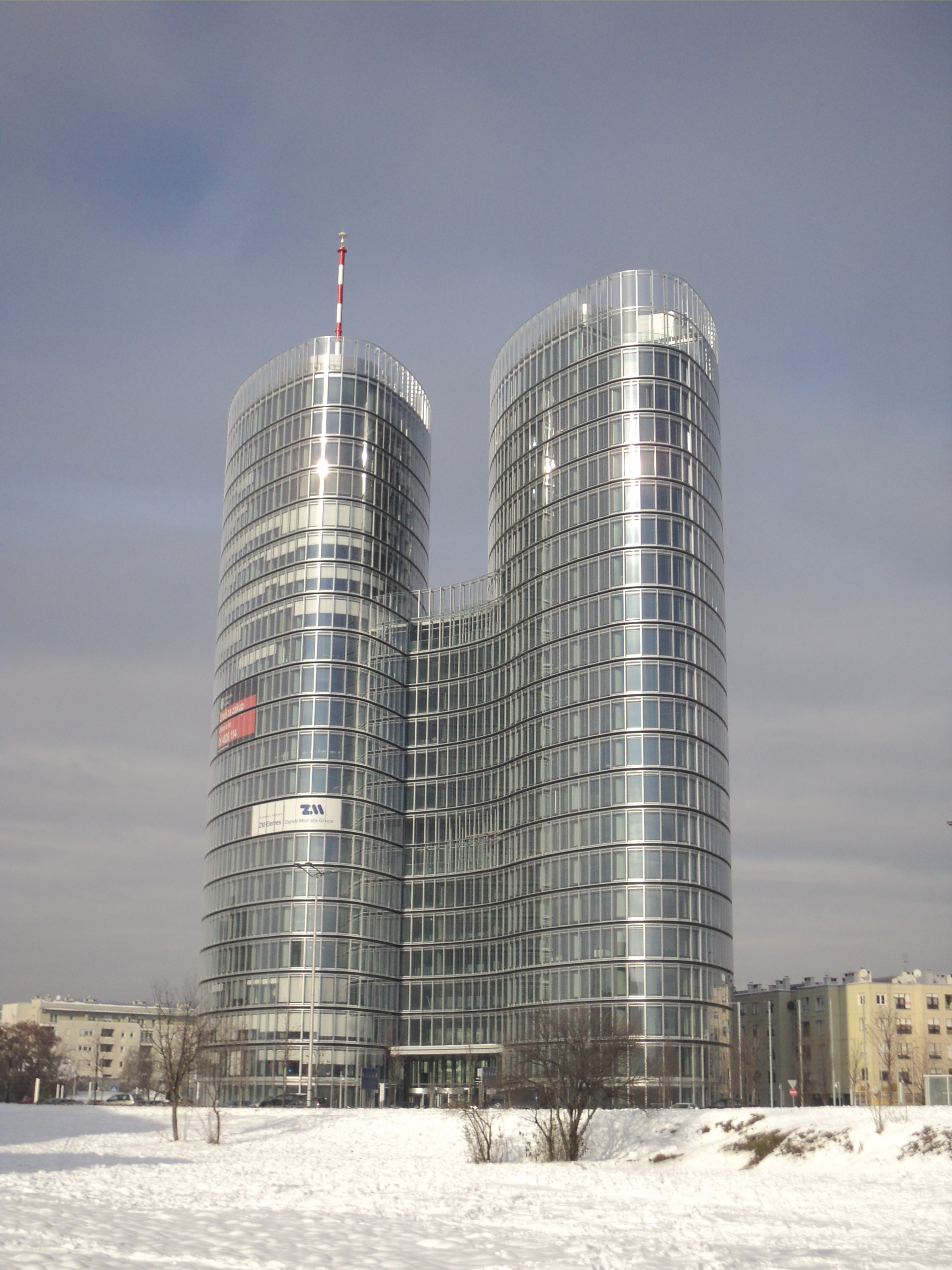
HAKOM is headquartered in Sky Office Tower in Zagreb.

Croatian Regulatory Authority for Network Industries (Croatian: Hrvatska regulatorna agencija za mrežne djelatnosti, commonly referred to as HAKOM), is Croatia's government regulatory agency tasked with regulating the telecommunications, postal, and rail industries.

In its present form, HAKOM was established in 2008 after the merger of two earlier regulatory agencies, the Croatian Telecommunications Agency (HAT) and the Postal Services Council (VPU). In 2014, the former Rail Market Regulatory Agency was also merged into HAKOM.

HAKOM is governed by its council, which includes five members, who are all appointed for five-year terms by the Croatian Parliament. They can also be dismissed by a vote in the Parliament upon proposal of the government. Decisions of the council are made by a majority vote of all of its members, i.e. any decision requires three council members to agree with.

The agency's executive director is in charge of HAKOM's staff, which performs expert, technical, and administrative roles.

HAKOM is Croatia's representative in a variety of multinational bodies:

- European Commission's Communications Committee (CoCom)
- European Regulators Group (ERG)
- Independent Regulators Group (IRG)
- Radio Spectrum Policy Group (RSPG)
- Radio Spectrum Committee (RSC)
- Body of European Regulators for Electronic Communications (BEREC)
- International Telecommunication Union (ITU)
- European Conference of Postal and Telecommunications Administrations (ECPTA)
- Universal Postal Union (UPU)
