= Andrej Dojkić =

Croatian film and television actor

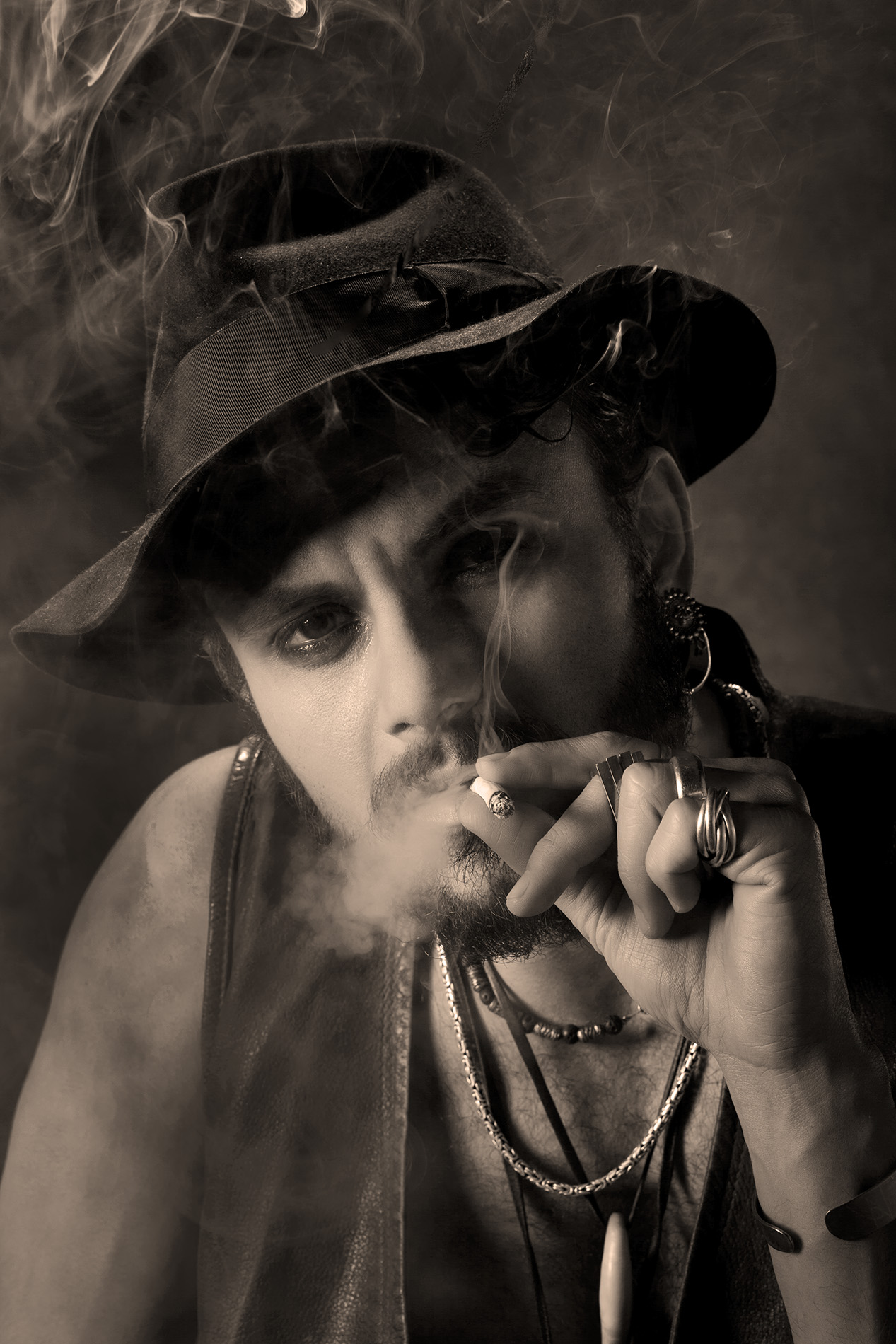
Andrej Dojkic

Andrej Dojkić (born 28 July 1980 in Osijek) is a Croatian actor. His first official screen part was in the 2005 TV series Forbidden Love followed by the 2007 TV series drama Dobre namjere (Good Intentions). He then went on to do a number of theater plays, movies and TV series. He received The Chancellors Award (Croatian: Rektorova nagrada) in 2007 for his interpretation of Orpheus in Eurydice during the Dubrovnik Summer Festival. His popularity further increased from his role as Andrija Golubić in Čista ljubav (Pure Love).

He has a daughter named Nicole with Ines Cvjetović, a woman from Dubrovnik.

== Filmography ==
=== Television ===
Year	Title	Role	Notes
2005–06	Forbidden Love	"Sasa"	
2007–08	Good intentions	"Petar"	
2011–12	Laras choice	"Maro"	
2014	Crime scene	"Andrija"	
2016	The Paper	"Ante"	
2017	The real woman	"Igor"	
2018	War before the war	"Mate"	
2017–18	Čista ljubav	"Andrija"	
2017–18	Club der singenden Metzger	"Vilhus"	

=== Film ===
Year	Title	Role	Notes
2011	Korak po korak	"Tattooed kid"	
2012	Captain and Audition	"Srdjan"	
2014	The Reaper	"Nikola"	
2014	Glembays	"Leone"	
2015	Wasn't Afraid to Die	"Anton"	
2016	American Renegades	"Guard"	
2017	The Egg	"Man"	
2017	Bellissima mai piu	"Fabijan"	
2018	For Good Old Times	"Goran"	
2021	The Match	"Laszlo Horvath"	
