= Hrvatski Top Model season 2 =

Hrvatski Top Model
- Season 2

Release
- Original network: RTL
- Original release: October 3 – November 28, 2010

Season chronology
- ← Previous; Season 1

Hrvatski Top Model Season 2 is the second Season of the reality documentary based on Tyra Banks' America's Next Top Model. After an absence of more than two years the show returned on October 3, 2010, with a completely new channel and Vanja Rupena as the new host. The winner will receive a contract with Talia Modelsas well as a spread in the Croatian issue of Elle Magazine.

The season was aired from October 3 to November 28, 2010. After 9 weeks, Rafaela Franić was named the winner of the second Season beating Nikolina Jurković and Andrea Katkić in the final.

== Contestants ==
(ages stated are at start of contest)

Name	Age	Hometown	Outcome	Place
Ana Aračić	19	Slavonski Brod	Episode 2	12
Monika Horvat	18	Crikvenica	Episode 3	11
Deni Žižić	20	Trogir	Episode 4	10
Kristina Petričević	18	Brač	Episode 5	9
Iva Pajković	20	Medulin	Episode 6	8–7
Anita Vulin	19	Biograd	Episode 6	8–7
Mada Peršić	22	Zagreb	Episode 7	6
Ela Arapović	18	Zagreb	Episode 8	5–4
Anđela Melvan	19	Kaštel	Episode 8	5–4
Andrea Katkić	20	Zagreb	Episode 9	3
Nikolina Jurković	21	Šibenik	Episode 9	2
Rafaela Franić	20	Trogir	Episode 9	1

== Summaries ==
=== Call-out order ===
Vanja's call-out order
Order	Episodes								
Order	1	2	3	4	5	6	7	8	9
1	Anita	Deni	Kristina	Anita	Anđela	Iva	Anđela	Rafaela	Rafaela
2	Deni	Mada	Rafaela	Iva	Ela	Nikolina	Ela	Ela	Nikolina
3	Kristina	Anita	Mada	Andrea	Iva	Mada	Nikolina	Nikolina	Andrea
4	Iva	Nikolina	Iva	Ela	Nikolina	Anđela	Rafaela	Andrea	
5	Nikolina	Andrea	Monika	Nikolina	Mada	Rafaela	Andrea	Anđela	
6	Rafaela	Anđela	Nikolina	Rafaela	Andrea	Ela	Mada		
7	Anđela	Rafaela	Andrea	Kristina	Rafaela	Andrea			
8	Monika	Iva	Deni	Mada	Anita	Anita			
9	Andrea	Ela	Ela	Anđela	Kristina				
10	Ela	Kristina	Anita	Deni					
11	Mada	Monika	Anđela						
12	Ana	Ana							

The contestant was eliminated
The contestant won the competition

- In Episode 1, Ana was called, but this was not shown.
- In Episode 2, Anđela was called, but this was not shown
- Rafaela won a trip to a Philipp Plein runway show in Milan at the end of episode 5. However, it was not announced until episode 6.

=== Photo shoot guide ===
- Episode 1 photo shoot: Pin up girls (casting)
- Episode 2 photo shoot: Makeovers
- Episode 3 photo shoot: Underwater sirens
- Episode 4 photo shoot: Moaning brides
- Episode 5 photo shoot: Seafood beauty shots
- Episode 6 photo shoot: Jumping high
- Episode 7 photo shoot: Romantic sensuality
- Episode 8 photo shoot: Gender swap
- Episode 9 photo shoot: Animal shoot

== Judges ==
- Vanja Rupena - famous Croatian model. She represented Croatia at Miss World 1996.
- Saša Joka - fashion editor of Croatian edition of Elle Magazine
- Tihana Harapin-Zalepugin - fashion manager, owner of Talia Model agency
