= Vanja Rupena =

Croatian model (born 1978)

- Born: 18 April 1978 (age 48); Koper, SR Slovenia, SFR Yugoslavia
- Occupation: Model
- Modeling information
- Height: 1.78 m (5 ft 10 in)
- Hair color: Brown
- Eye color: Green

Vanja Rupena (born 18 April 1978) is a Croatian model and beauty pageant titleholder. She won the 1996 Miss Croatia and represented Croatia in the Miss World 1996 pageant in Bangalore, India.

She appeared on the cover of the Croatian edition of Elle magazine in July 2006, July 2009 and November 2010.

In May 2010 she became host of RTL's reality documentary series Hrvatski Top Model, the Croatian edition of America's Next Top Model.
