= 2005 in Croatian television =

This is a list of Croatian television related events from 2005.

== Television shows ==
=== Starting in the 2000s ===
- Big Brother (2004-2008, 2016–present)
- Zabranjena ljubav (2004-2008)

=== Ending in 2005 ===
- Hrvatski Idol (2004-2005)

== Networks and services ==
=== New channels in 2005 ===
- 1 June – Croatian Music Channel

== See also ==
- 2005 in Croatia
