= 2006 in Croatian television =

This is a list of Croatian television related events from 2006.

== Events ==
- 15 December - Danijel Rimanić wins season 3 of Big Brother.

== Debuts ==
- 2 December - Ples sa zvijezdama (2006-2013)

== Television shows ==
=== 2000s ===
- Big Brother (2004-2008, 2016–present)
- Zabranjena ljubav (2004-2008)
