= 2004 in Croatian television =

This is a list of Croatian television related events from 2004.

== Events ==
- 28 March - HRT 3 shuts down for the first time.
- 24 April - The Croatian version of Pop Idol debuts on Nova TV.
- 30 April - RTL launches.
- 5 June - Žanamari Lalić wins the first season of Hrvatski Idol.
- 18 September - The Croatian version of Big Brother debuts on RTL.
- 26 September - The first season of Big Brother is won by Saša Tkalčević.

== Debuts ==
- 24 April - Hrvatski Idol (2004-2005)
- 18 September - Big Brother (2004-2008, 2016–present)
- 25 October - Zabranjena ljubav (2004-2008)

=== International debuts ===
- December - US 2 Stupid Dogs (1993-1995)
