= 2011 in Croatian television =

This is a list of Croatian television related events from 2011.

== Events ==
- 13 March – Croatia debuted on Veliki brat. It was aired on RTL.
- 17 June – Goran Kos wins the third and final season of Hrvatska traži zvijezdu.
- 27 June – Marijana Čvrljak wins the fourth and final season of Veliki brat for Croatia, becoming the show's first and only female winner.
- 17 December – Singer Marko Tolja and his partner Ana Herceg win the sixth season of Ples sa zvijezdama.
- 18 December – Shadow theatre company Promenada Klub win the third and final season of Supertalent.

== Debuts ==
- 13 March – Veliki brat (2011–2013, 2015–present)

== Television shows ==
=== 2000s ===
- Ples sa zvijezdama (2006–2013)

== Ending this year ==
- Hrvatska traži zvijezdu (2009–2011)
- Supertalent (2009–2011, 2016–present)

== Networks and services ==
=== Channels ===
==== New channels ====
- 2 January – Doma TV
- 11 April – GP1
- December – Nickelodeon

== See also ==
- 2011 in Croatia
