= 1970s in Irish television =

For articles on Irish television in the 1970s please see:

- 1970 in Irish television
- 1971 in Irish television
- 1972 in Irish television
- 1973 in Irish television
- 1974 in Irish television
- 1975 in Irish television
- 1976 in Irish television
- 1977 in Irish television
- 1978 in Irish television
- 1979 in Irish television
