= 2015 in Croatian television =

This is a list of Croatian television related events from 2015.

== Events ==
- 22 March – X Factor Adria debuts in Croatia, airing on RTL.
- 25 April - Nina Kraljić wins the first season of The Voice – Najljepši glas Hrvatske.
- 21 June - Amel Ćurić from Bosnia and Herzegovina wins the second season of X Factor Adria.
- 12 December - Darko Petkovski from Macedonia wins the fifth season of Veliki brat.

== Debuts ==
- 17 January – The Voice – Najljepši glas Hrvatske (2015–present)
- 22 March – X Factor Adria (2015–present)
- 4 September - Veliki brat (2011-2013, 2015–present)

== Networks and services ==
=== Channels ===
==== New channels ====
- 24 December – Laudato TV

== See also ==
- 2015 in Croatia
