= Barbara Radulović =

Croatian television host

Barbara Radulović (born 2 September 1982) is a Croatian TV host. She is perhaps best known as a participant in the Nova TV talent show Story Supernova Talents in 2003. After that appearance, Radulović soon had a chance to host the HRT music show Video-kiosk. In 2010, she was working as a host on the Croatian Music Channel, which started on November 5, 2007.

Born in Ogulin, Radulović has since lived in Zagreb, where she graduated at the Faculty of Economics.

Radulović shot an editorial for the Croatian men's magazine, Klik, in 2003.

She was chosen as the most beautiful Croatian woman on the Croatian portal Index.hr for the year 2007.
