= Red Carpet (Nova TV) =

- Genre: Television magazine
- Country of origin: Croatia
- Original language: Croatian

Production
- Production company: Nova TV

Original release
- Network: Nova TV
- Release: 8 June 2003 – 30 December 2012

Red Carpet is a showbiz television magazine produced by Nova TV. It was a popular programme in Croatia, with reporters and journalists that reported on and local showbiz information, as well as stories about famous people, fashion and various current events.

Red Carpet also aired sarcastic episodes about Croatian celebrities known as Bijele udovice (English: The White Widows).

The editor and host was Daniel Delale, and co-hosts were Ana Stunić and Ivana Nanut. In 2010, the show aired on Sundays at 11 pm.

The production ceased in 2012.
