= Nickelodeon (Croatian TV channel) =

- Logo used since 2023 (Note: The logo's wordmark has been in use since 2010. Additionally, there is a variant meant to be used for white backgrounds; the main variant has a white wordmark in conjunction with a fully orange splat.)
- Country: Croatia
- Broadcast area: Croatia; Bosnia and Herzegovina

Programming
- Language: Croatian
- Picture format: HDTV 1080i (downscaled to 576i for the SD feed)

Ownership
- Owner: Paramount Networks EMEAA
- Parent: Nickelodeon Group

History
- Launched: December 2011

Links
- Website: Official website

Nickelodeon is a Croatian cable and digital satellite television network dedicated to children. It was launched in December 2011. The channel broadcasts 24 hours a day. All animated and live-action shows are dubbed into Croatian. Dubs are made by NET studio. The channel is served by the Pan-European feed.

== Dubs ==
The channel is completely Animated series and films dubbed into Croatian. The dubs are made by NET studio after the studio shutdown after Croatian version delayed.

== Programming Blocks ==
=== Weekend Awesomeness ===
This programming block starts every Sunday at 5:00PM sati and airs special episodes and nickelodeon movies.

=== Saturday Marathons ===
This programming block starts every Saturday at 12:00PM and airs a marathon of a specific show until 3:00PM

=== Nick Jr ===
Nick Jr. is a programming block on Nickelodeon that airs pre school content.
