= Marijana Mikulić =

Croatian actress (born 1981)

Marijana Mikulić is a Croatian actress. She has appeared in numerous Croatian films and television series.

== Early life and education ==
Marijana Mikulić was born 6 December 1981 in Široki Brijeg, present-day Bosnia and Herzegovina. She enrolled in the Faculty of Law, University of Zagreb in 2000, but left in her fourth year without graduating. She graduated from the Academy of Dramatic Art, University of Zagreb in 2008.

== Acting career ==
Mikulić’s first role was in the stage play Dvije by Tena Štivičić, performed at the Croatian National Theatre in Mostar. Her first television role was in the series Obični ljudi (Ordinary people, 2006-2007). She made her breakthrough in the series Ponos Ratkajevih (The Pride of the Ratkajs, 2007-2008). She also had a supporting role in Zakon ljubavi (The Law of Love, 2008). After a four-year break due to pregnancy and caring for her child, she returned to television in Stipe u gostima (Stipe is a guest) in 2012. She appeared in a comedy series Glas naroda (Voice of the People), a political satire, from 2014-2015).

Mikulić had her first film role in Transmania by director Sara Hribar in 2013. In a 2019 film General, about a Croatian lieutenant general Ante Gotovina, she had a role of Gotovina's wife Dunja.

== Personal life ==
Mikulić is married to Josip Mikulić, a professor at Faculty of Economics and Business, University of Zagreb. They have three sons. One of her sons has autism spectrum disorder, which the actress often talks about on social media.

== Filmography ==
=== Film ===
| Year | Title | Role | Notes |
|---|---|---|---|
| 2013 | Transmania | nurse | |
| 2013 | Visoka modna napetost | Ina | |
| 2016 | Ne gledaj mi u pijat | Katarina | |
| 2017 | Mrtve ribe | Ranka | |
| 2019 | General | Dunja Zloić | |

=== Television ===
| Year | Title | Role | Notes |
|---|---|---|---|
| 2006-2007 | Obični ljudi | Iva Dragan | |
| 2007 | Ja Che Guevara | Gina | |
| 2007-2008 | Ponos Ratkajevih | Izabela 'Bela' pl. Ratkaj | |
| 2008 | Zakon ljubavi | Zrinka Kramarić | |
| 2012 | Počivali u miru | Ružica Rukavina | |
| 2012-2014 | Stipe u gostima | Stanka | |
| 2014-2015 | Kud puklo da puklo | Renata Kolarić | |
| 2015 | Lud, zbunjen, normalan | Sonja | |
| 2014-2015 | Glas naroda | Tereza | |
| 2016-2017 | Prava žena | Danijela Erceg | |
| 2018 | Čista ljubav | policewoman | |
| 2021 | Nestali | Ane | |
| 2021 | Blago nama | sister Karolina | |
| 2022 | Metropolitanci | veterinarian | |
| 2022 | Kumovi | Vera Leško | |
| 2023 | Gora | Marin's mother | |
