= Tatjana Jurić =

Croatian presenter and model

Tatjana Jurić (born February 10, 1982) is a Croatian television and radio presenter, and former model.

== Biography ==
Jurić was born in Zagreb and later moved to Milan to work as a model. In 2005, she joined the Exploziv television show on RTL Televizija. In 2008, she became the host of season one of Hrvatski Top Model, the Croatian version of America's Next Top Model. She has also hosted Exkluziv s Tatjanom Jurić (Exclusive with Tatjana Jurić), and radio programs. In 2011, she was a contestant on Season 6 of Ples sa zvijezdama (the Croatian Dancing with the Stars).

She studied political science at the University of Zagreb.
