= 2016 in Croatian television =

This is a list of Croatian television related events from 2016.

== Events ==
- 23 April - Ruža Janjiš wins the second season of The Voice – Najljepši glas Hrvatske.
- 3 June - Romano Obilinović wins the sixth season of Big Brother.
- 11 July - RTL Croatia World launches.

== Debuts ==
- 17 April - Big Brother (2004-2008, 2016–present)

== Television shows ==
=== 2010s ===
- The Voice – Najljepši glas Hrvatske (2015–present)
- X Factor Adria (2015–present)

== See also ==
- 2016 in Croatia
