= 2013 in Croatian television =

This is a list of Croatian television related events from 2013.

== Events ==
- 6 May - Žarko Stojanović from Serbia, a housemate on the fifth season of the French version of Big Brother Secret Story wins the fifth and final season of Veliki brat.
- 21 December - Mamutica actor Mislav Čavajda and his partner Petra Jeričević win the eighth and final season of Ples sa zvijezdama.

== Ending this year ==
- Ples sa zvijezdama (2006-2013)
- Veliki brat (2011-2013, 2015–present)

== Deaths ==
Date	Name	Age	Cinematic Credibility
23 October	Dolores Lambaša	32	Croatian actress

== See also ==
- 2013 in Croatia
