= 1990s in Croatian television =

This is a list of Croatian television related events from the 1990s.

== Events ==
=== 1993 Events ===
- 15 May - Croatia enters the Eurovision Song Contest for the first time with "Don't Ever Cry" performed by Put.

=== 1996 Events ===
- 3 March - Maja Blagdan is selected to represent Croatia at the 1996 Eurovision Song Contest with her song "Sveta ljubav". She is selected to be the fourth Croatian Eurovision entry during Dora held at the Crystal Ballroom of Hotel Kvarner in Opatija.

== Channels ==
=== New channels ===
- 1 December 1999 - CBS Reality

== Television shows ==
=== Debuts in the 1990s ===
==== International Debuts ====
- (United States) Friends

== Deaths ==
=== 1996 Deaths ===
- August 15 – Sven Lasta, actor.

== See also ==
- Years in Croatia
- History of Croatia
- Television in Croatia (1980s, 2000s)
- List of Croatian films of the 1950s, 1960s, 1970s, 1980s
- 1990s in Irish television
