= 2000s in Croatian television =

This is a list of Croatian television related events from 2009.

== Events ==
- 5 January - Adnan Babajić from Bosnia and Herzegovina wins the first season of Operacija Trijumf.
- 17 April - The new Croatian Idol, under the title of Hrvatska traži zvijezdu debuts on RTL.
- 19 June - Bojan Jambrošić wins the first season of Hrvatska traži zvijezdu.
- 18 December - 15-year-old baton twirler Tihomir Bendelja wins the first season of Supertalent.
- 19 December - Singer and winner of the first season of Showtime Franka Batelić and her partner Ištvan Varga win the fourth season of Ples sa zvijezdama.

== Debuts ==
- 17 April - Hrvatska traži zvijezdu (2009-2011)
- 25 September - Supertalent (2009-2011, 2016–present)

== Television shows ==
=== 2000s ===
- Ples sa zvijezdama (2006-2013)

== Ending this year ==
- Operacija Trijumf (2008-2009)

== See also ==
- 2009 in Croatia
