= Zabranjena ljubav =

Croatian television soap opera

- Genre: Soap opera
- Based on: Sons and Daughters by Reg Watson
- Written by: Steven Zanoški; Dorotea Vučić; Tomislav Štefanac; Tomislav Hrpka; Marijana Nola; Luka Rukavina; Matija Kluković; Nikolina Čuljak; Sanja Kovačević; Filipa Burn; Ivana Mišetić
- Directed by: Berislav Makarović; Ljubo Lasić; Jure Pervanje; Boštjan Vrhovec; Nikola Ivanda; Siniša Bajt; Milivoj Puhlovski; Mirna Miličić
- Opening theme: "Srce nije kamen" by Toše Proeski
- Ending theme: "Srce nije kamen (instrumental)"
- Country of origin: Croatia
- Original language: Croatian
- No. of seasons: 4
- No. of episodes: 805

Production
- Executive producers: Tomaž Lehpamer; Milo Grisogono; Sanja Tucman
- Producers: Sue Green; Andrej Kregar
- Production location: Zagreb
- Camera setup: Multi-camera
- Running time: 25 minutes
- Production company: Fremantle Media

Original release
- Network: RTL Televizija
- Release: 25 October 2004 – 3 November 2008

Zabranjena ljubav (lit. "Forbidden Love", commonly abbreviated to ZLJ) is a Croatian daytime soap opera about the lives and loves of both young and older characters, focused on Zagreb, capital city of Croatia. Actors Mario Valentić, Antonija Šola, Nada Rocco, Dejan Marcikić and Anita Berisha (last one with some months of break) were the only remaining original cast members until the final episode.

== About show ==
The soap tackles controversial issues, such as incest, rape, homosexuality, adultery, and deadly diseases. The viewers of this soap are varied, ranging from small children to senior citizens.

Zabranjena ljubav is a remake of Australian soap opera Sons and Daughters, initially based on that serial's original story and character outlines, before diverging as the new series progressed.

In April 2008, RTL Televizija announced that the highly popular soap opera would end its run after 4 years that fall in its time slot 7:30 PM. A total of 805 episodes were filmed, but on the 4 April 2008, channel RTL canceled broadcasting after 759 episodes. The rest of episodes were shown only in Autumn 2011, with the series finale aired on November 3, 2011.

Besides its native Croatia, Zabranjena ljubav was also broadcast in Bosnia and Herzegovina, North Macedonia and Serbia.

With 805 episodes, the series held the title of longest TV series ever filmed in former Yugoslavia for 18 years, until September 2023 when it was overtaken by Serbian soap opera Igra sudbine.

== History ==
The original story begins by introducing a handsome 22-year-old Danijel Lončar (Zoran Pribičević) coming home to Zagreb, on his 22nd birthday, after losing his job in Italy. At the railway station, he bumps into a beautiful girl. They both feel immediate attraction. Danijel doesn’t even get the chance to ask for her name as they are greeted by their friends and family.

The girl is Petra Novak (Anita Berisha) who also returned home, after studying photography in London, on a present-day she also celebrates her 22nd birthday.

It soon transpires that Danijel and Petra were twins separated at birth. Danijel had initially been raised by the wise Nada Horvat (Nada Rocco) before returning to his father Josip Lončar (Drazen Mikulić), and Petra raised by her mother Viktorija Novak (Sanja Vejnović) who had married into money to a rich aristocrate widower Stjepan Novak (Velimir Čokljat).

The parents of the twins had each married other people and raised families which had other adult children. The Lončar family comprised Danijel's father Josip Lončar, a construction worker; and Josip's wife Biserka Lončar (Vanja Matujec), a warm-hearted, down-to-earth housewife. Their children were Iva Lončar (Marija Kobić) and Matija (Filip Riđički), Iva had just started a romantic involvement with Igor Carević (Dejan Marcikić) and Matija started seeing his class member Lana Kos (Petra Kurtela). Petra had grown up with her mother Viktorija (Sanja Vejnović), Viktorija's husband Stjepan who was a successful wineyard owner and businessman, and Stjepan's son from an earlier marriage, the spiteful Borna Novak (Mario Valentić).

After Danijel's investigation into Petra's whereabouts, he slowly enters the world of the powerful Novak family by landing a job as a gardener, not knowing he is working for his biological mother, nor that he has fallen in love with his own sister.

Other major characters include Lidija Bauer (Katija Zubčić) who has always had strong feelings for Stjepan, but who stepped away out of respect towards the family and her children. Lidija has two children of her own: the spoiled and stubborn teenager Tina Bauer (Antonija Šola) and the good-natured medical student Leon Bauer (Mario Mohenski, later Marin Knežević), who was betrothed to Petra at Viktorija's instigation only for the wedding to be cancelled after a revelation about his homosexuality. Viktorija's best friend, the dizzy socialite Stela Vidak (Matija Prskalo), was introduced as a minor figure during the show's early days as someone to whom Viktorija could recite expository dialogue about her latest scheme to, but soon emerged as a key character.

== Series overview ==
Season	Episodes		Originally released	
Season	Episodes		First released	Last released
1	180		October 25, 2004	July 1, 2005
2	215		September 5, 2005	June 30, 2006
3	215		September 4, 2006	June 29, 2007
4	195	149	September 3, 2007	April 4, 2008
4	195	46	October 3, 2011	November 3, 2011

== Cast ==
=== 2008 Cast ===
Actor	Role	Status
Anita Berisha	Petra Lončar	2004–2008
Mario Valentić	Borna Novak	2004–2008
Antonija Šola	Tina Bauer	2004–2008
Dejan Marcikić	Igor Carević	2004–2008
Nada Rocco	Nada Barić	2004–2008
Vesna Tominac Matačić	Karolina Novak †	2005–2008
Zoran Gogić	Jure Šarić	2006–2008
Maja Petrin	Dunja Barišić	2006–2008
Vladimir Tintor	Franjo Barišić	2006–2008
Robert Plemić	Luka Laušić	2006–2008
Anđela Ramljak	Marijana Benčić	2006–2008
Frano Lasić	Marinko Ružić	2006–2008
Danira Gović	Angelina Kovač	2007–2008
Lorena Nosić	Mirna Šarić	2007–2008
Ozren Domiter	Ivica Šarić	2008
Sandra Bagarić	Eleonora Šarić	2008

=== Recurring cast members ===
Actor	Role
Mario Mlinarić	Jakov Barišić
Šime Zanze	waiter Robert
Danilo Vukčević	Mate Grom
Mario Lukajić	Tom Ružić #2 †
Luka Peroš	Arhitekt Juraga

=== Departed cast members ===
Actor	Role	Status	Fate
Mario Mohenski	Leon Bauer #1 †	2004	Actor left the series; replaced by Marin Knežević
Marin Knežević	Leon Bauer #2 †	2004–2005	Killed in a car accident
Sanja Vejnović	Viktorija Novak †	2004–2005	Killed by Nina Radić
Mirna Medaković	Maja Vuković	2004–2005	Goes to Knin
Marina Kostelac	Vesna Kos	2004–2005	Gets arrested
Andrej Dojkić	Aleksandar Barić	2005–2006	Goes to Italy
Ivan Martinec	Ljubo Carević	2004–2006	Goes to Split
Filip Riđički	Matija Lončar	2004–2006	Goes to Australia
Zoran Pribičević	Danijel Lončar †	2004–2006	Killed by drowning
Dražen Mikulić	Josip Lončar	2004–2005; guest in 2006.	Goes to Afghanistan
Petra Kurtela	Lana Kos	2004–2006	Ends up in rehabilitation centre
Velimir Čokljat	Stjepan Novak	2004–2006	Goes to Paris
Matija Prskalo	Stela Vidak	2004–2006	Goes to Los Angeles
Vanda Božić	Andrea Kirin	2006	Gets arrested
Katija Zubčić	Lidija Bauer-Novak	2004–2006; guest in 2007.	Goes to Paris
Mirsad Tuka	Zlatko Fijan †	2005–2007	Accidentally killed by Ana
Jelena Perčin	Ana Fijan-Benčić	2005–2007	Goes to Argentina
Marija Kobić	Iva Lončar	2004–2007	Goes to Australia
Vanja Matujec	Biserka Fijan (ex Lončar)	2004–2007	Goes to Australia
Marko Čabov	Nikola Benčić	2006–2007	Goes to Argentina
Jozo Šuker	Antun Benčić	2006–2008	Left Zagreb
