= Television in Croatia =

Television in Croatia was first introduced in 1956. As of 2012, there are 10 nationwide and 21 regional DVB-T (Digital Video Broadcasting – Terrestrial) television channels, and there are more than 30 other channels either produced in the Republic of Croatia or produced for the Croatian market and broadcast via IPTV (Internet Protocol television), cable, or satellite television. The electronic communications market in Croatia is regulated by the Croatian Regulatory Authority for Network Industries (HAKOM), which issues broadcast licenses and monitors the market. The DVB-T and satellite transmission infrastructure is developed and maintained by the state-owned company Odašiljači i veze (OiV).

The first television signal broadcast in Croatia occurred in 1939 during the Zagreb Fair, where Philips showcased its television system. The first regular broadcasts started in 1956, when Television Zagreb was established as the first TV station in the Yugoslav Radio Television system. Color broadcasts began in 1972. Coverage and the number of channels grew steadily, and by the 2000s there were four channels with nationwide coverage in Croatia. DVB-T signal broadcasts began in 2002, and in 2010 a full digital switchover was completed. During that period, the IPTV, cable, and satellite television markets grew considerably, and by 2011 only 60.7 percent of households received DVB-T television only; the remainder were subscribed to IPTV, cable, and satellite TV in addition or as the sole source of TV reception.

As of January 2012, DVB-T is broadcast in three multiplexes, while the territory of Croatia is divided into nine main allotment regions and smaller local allotments corresponding to major cities. High-definition television (HDTV) is broadcast only through IPTV, although HDTV DVB-T test programming was broadcast from 2007 to 2011. A DVB-T2 test broadcast was conducted in 2011.

As of November 2019, all national channels are transmitted via three DVB-T and one DVB-T2 (HEVC/H.265) MUXes. After June 2020, DVB-T MUXes will be switched off, and all channels will be distributed via two DVB-T2 (HEVC/H.265) MUXes.

Television in Croatia, as well as other media in the country, are criticised for lack of balance of global issues and trends on one hand and national topics covered on the other. All major television networks in Croatia are generally thought to be under excessive influence of commercialism. State-owned Croatian Radiotelevision is required to produce and broadcast educational programmes, documentaries, and programmes aimed at the diaspora and national minorities in Croatia. Television in Croatia is considered to be important in avenue for NGOs communicating their concerns to the public and to criticising the Croatian authorities. Television is the primary source of information for 57% of the Croatian population.

== Analog television ==
=== Introduction of television ===
Philips demonstrated television at the Zagreb Fair in 1939

Zagreb was one of the first European cities where television pictures were broadcast. Beginning on 26 August 1939, the Zagreb Fair featured a Philips television system, operated for short periods each day of the exhibition (until 4 September). The Philips television, consisting of a transmitter and several receivers, was operated by Eric Klaas de Vries in the Dutch pavilion at the fair. The fair newspaper announced the event as the first, after television broadcasts in London and Berlin. The programming consisted of comedy, opera, music performances, and the first TV news broadcast in Croatia.

The first TV broadcast after the 1939 Zagreb Fair was in 1956. A transmitter was set up on Sljeme in the Tomislavov Dom Hotel, and during the evening of 15 May 1956, Austrian and Italian channels were transmitted (including Rai 1). The first live broadcast produced locally was the transmission of the opening of the Zagreb Fair on 7 September 1956, and Television Zagreb began regular broadcasting on 29 November.

=== Development ===
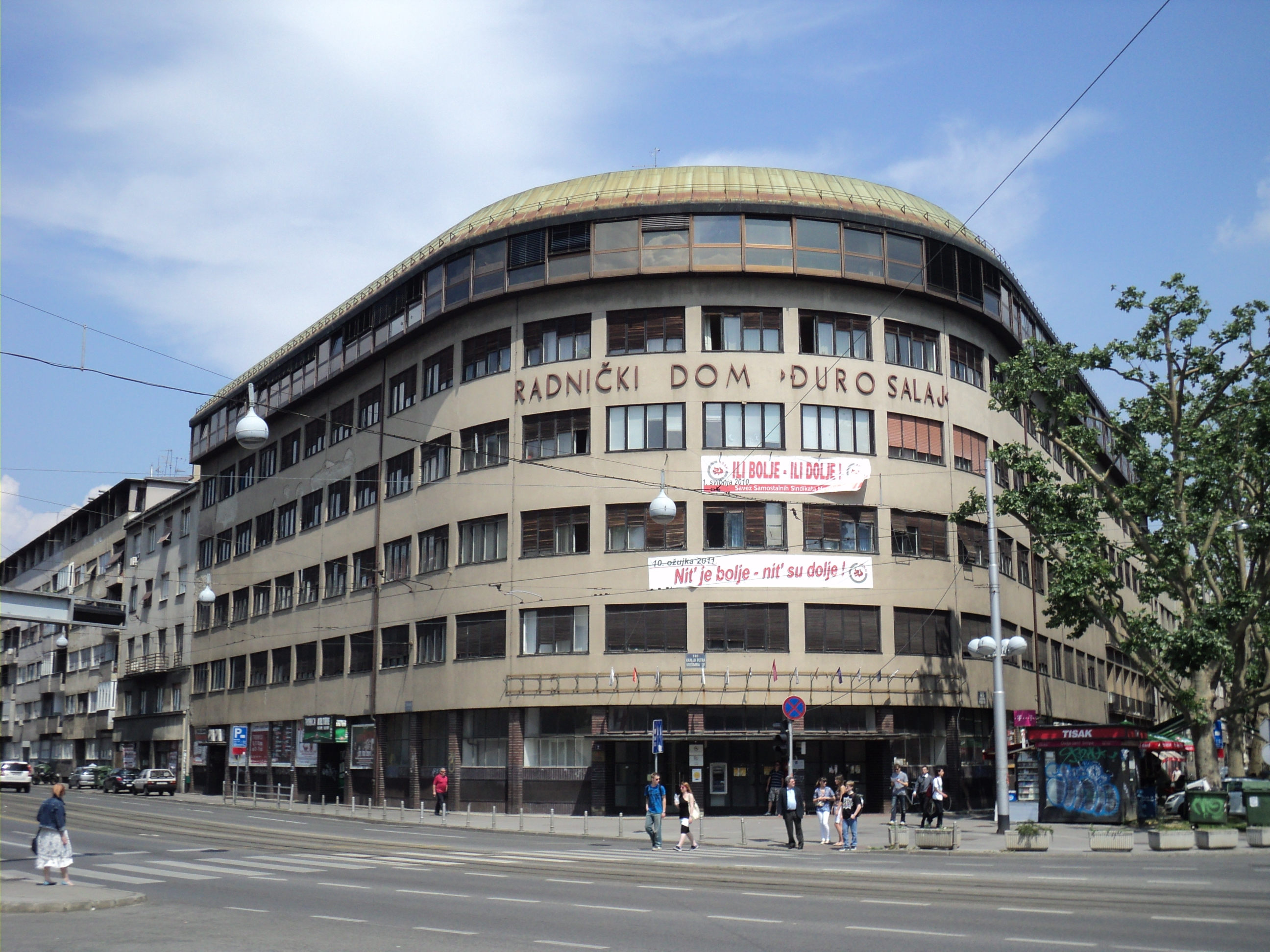
Television Zagreb set up its studio in Šubićeva Street in 1962

The Zagreb TV centre became a member of the Yugoslav Radio Television (JRT) (an umbrella organization of television stations in Yugoslavia), acting as Eurovision Technical Centre for the JRT. In 1972, Television Zagreb began broadcasting of its second channel, and switched to airing its programming in color in 1975. The third Television Zagreb channel was introduced in 1988, and teletext service was launched in 1990.

Following the breakup of Yugoslavia, Television Zagreb was renamed to Croatian Radiotelevision (HRT) and it became a member of the European Broadcasting Union; however, HRT suffered significant war damage to its infrastructure as 80 percent of its transmitters and 30 relay stations were damaged, destroyed or occupied.

In October 1999, all three nationwide HRT channels started broadcasting around the clock, but in 2002, HRT 3 ceased operations. Nova TV, the first privately owned television station in Croatia, began operating in 2000. It was followed by another privately owned broadcaster, RTL Televizija, on 30 April 2004. Both Nova TV and RTL Televizija aired a single analog TV channel each.

In 2002, Odašiljači i veze d.o.o. was set up as an independent company; it was previously a part of HRT and it was tasked with maintaining the television-transmission infrastructure in Croatia. In 2014, there were 26 television stations in Croatia, including the four nationwide channels.

=== End of analog broadcasting ===
The Government of Croatia decided that simulcast (simultaneous analog and digital DVB-T broadcasting of the main channels) was to cease in 2010. The territory of Croatia was split into nine digital-TV allotment regions. The analog broadcast network was switched off gradually (by the digital-TV allotment regions) beginning on 26 January 2010. The process was completed, achieving digital switchover on 5 October 2010, but geographically isolated areas were left with analog broadcasts. The last analog TV transmitter in Croatia was shut down on 30 September 2011, as DVB-T coverage was extended to 98.5 percent of households in Croatia and no less than 95 percent of households in each of the allotment regions. Approximately 6,000 households were left with no reception of DVB-T or analog TV broadcasts.

Allotment	Switchoff dates in 2010
D05	26 January
D03	3 March
D07	30 March
D09	27 April
D01	25 May
D02	29 June
D06	20 July
D08	7 September
D04	5 October

== DVB-T television ==
DVB-T regions of Croatia

The first trial broadcasts of DVB-T signals began in May 2002 in Zagreb, and in 2008, the government developed the Analogue to Digital Television Broadcasting Switchover Strategy for the Republic of Croatia. In July 2008, this Government of Croatia announced that 106 million kuna (c. 14.1 million euros) were earmarked for the purpose. The government-subsidized purchase of DVB-T receivers, distributing discount coupons worth 75 kuna (c. 10 euros) to subscribers of the HRT. The first two multiplexes (MUX A and MUX B) were introduced in April 2009, with the third (MUX D) introduced in July 2010.

On 5 October 2010, the switch to DVB-T was virtually complete, as all major analog TV transmitters were phased out. The DVB-T transmissions in Croatia are all standard-definition, MPEG-2. MUX A is available to more than 98.5 percent of the population of Croatia, and both MUX A and MUX B are available to more than 95 percent of population in each multiplex-allotment region. MUX D is available to approximately 90 percent of the population of Croatia, and at least 70 percent of the population in each of the allotment regions. There are 897,496 households (60.7 percent) in Croatia receiving DVB-T television only.

The terrestrial television infrastructure in Croatia is operated by Odašiljači i veze d.o.o. (OIV). The company was established as an independent entity in 2002, when a division developing and maintaining electronic communications infrastructure was removed from the HRT corporate system. As of January 2012, OIV operates and maintains 222 television transmitters and broadcast relay stations.

There are nine main regions of digital TV allotments (encompassing larger portions of Croatia) and additional, geographically small allotment areas designed for local broadcasters (typically covering a single city). The main DVB-T television allotment regions are assigned markings D1–D9. The D1 region encompasses Osijek-Baranja and Vukovar-Syrmia counties, as well as parts of Brod-Posavina County east of Oprisavci. The D2 region covers the rest of Brod-Posavina County, Požega-Slavonia and Virovitica-Podravina counties and nearly all of Bjelovar-Bilogora County, except for an area north of the city of Bjelovar and part of Sisak-Moslavina County around the town of Novska. The D3 region includes a part of Bjelovar-Bilogora County not encompassed by the D2 region, as well as the territories of Koprivnica-Križevci, Varaždin and Međimurje counties. The D4 region includes Sisak-Moslavina County (except the area around Novska), Krapina-Zagorje and Zagreb counties, the city of Zagreb and the northern part of Karlovac County (including Karlovac and Duga Resa).

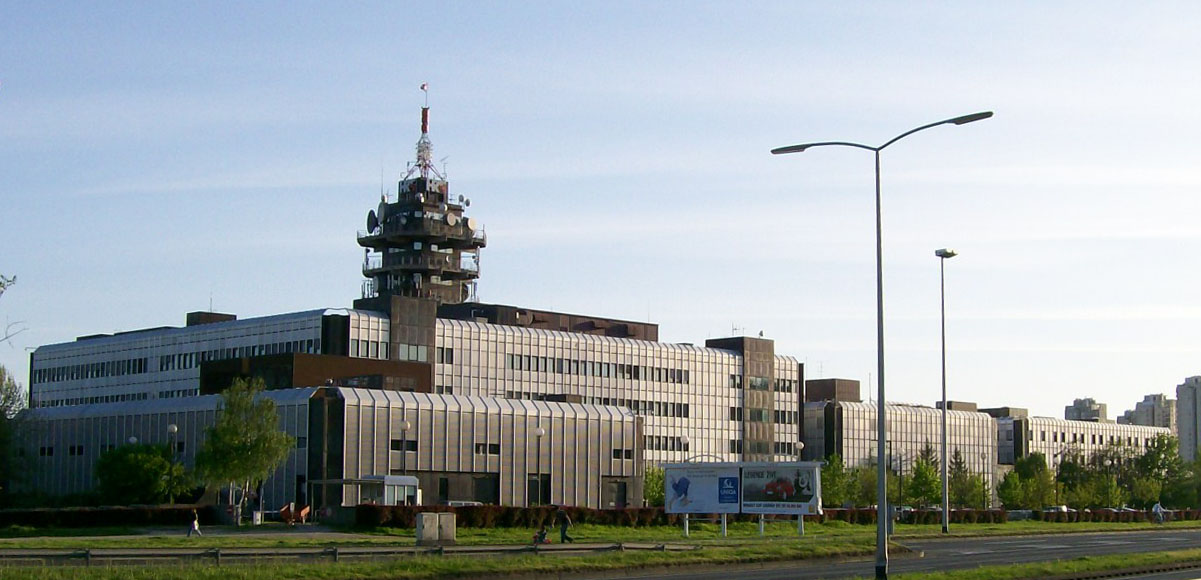
HRT headquarters in Zagreb

The D5 region covers Istria County and Primorje-Gorski Kotar County (except parts of the county east of Ravna Gora and the area around Novalja on the island of Pag), but it includes the coastal areas of Lika-Senj County opposite the islands of Krk and Rab. The D6 region encompasses parts of Primorje-Gorski Kotar and Lika-Senj counties outside the D4 and D5 regions, except for parts of the latter (south of Lovinac) and coastal parts of the same county opposite the island of Pag. Those two areas are a part of the D7 region, along with Zadar and Šibenik-Knin counties. The D8 region includes the entire Split-Dalmatia County as well as parts of Dubrovnik-Neretva County around Ploče and Metković, a part of Pelješac peninsula west of Dubrava and the islands of Korčula and Lastovo. The D9 region encompasses the rest of Dubrovnik-Neretva County.

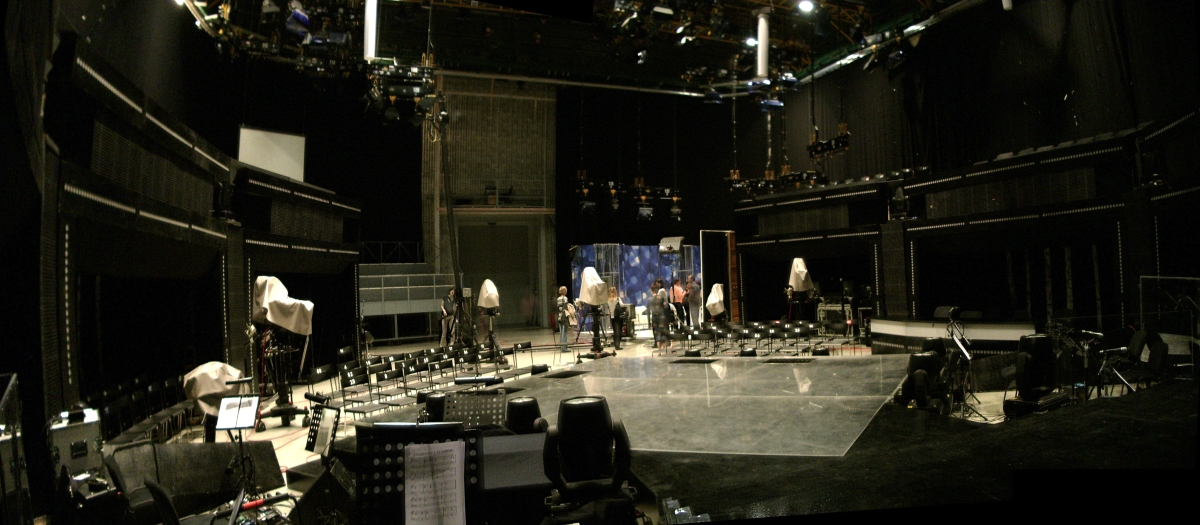
HRT's Anton Marti studio

There are also 12 local DVB-T television allotment regions, covering specific cities and their immediate surroundings. Those are d11 in Osijek, d21 in Slavonski Brod, d31 covering Varaždin and Čakovec, d44 encompassing Zagreb and Velika Gorica, d45 in Jastrebarsko, d46 covering Karlovac and Duga Resa, d53 encompassing Rijeka, Crikvenica, Novi Vinodolski and most of the island of Krk, d54 in Pula and Rovinj, d71 in Zadar, d72 in Šibenik, d82 covering Split, Trogir, Omiš, the island of Šolta and a large part of the island of Brač, and d91 in Dubrovnik. A local multiplex named "L-ZA" started in 2015 on UHF 41 in the town of Sveta Nedelja, transmitting local channel TV Zapad.

When DVB-T broadcasting started in Italy in December 2010, interference was observed in northwest parts of Istria, and later in areas around Zadar and Šibenik. The interference was caused by the use of frequencies assigned to Croatia by Italian transmitters and excessive transmitter power. A complaint was filed by the Croatian regulator of the DVB-T market, the Croatian Regulatory Authority for Network Industries (HAKOM), with the Italian authorities. OIV installed additional transmitters in the affected areas to strengthen its signal coverage and reduce interference by February 2011 at a cost of 1 million kuna (c. 133,000 euros). Although Italian Minister of Economic Development Paolo Romani announced in August 2011 that the problems should be resolved shortly (a transmitter causing interference was shut down and the power of several others was reduced), the situation was not completely resolved throughout 2011 and the International Telecommunication Union's Radio Regulations Board became involved in the process. In the meantime, other technical solutions were devised and implemented (in addition to the emergency transmitters) in order to improve digital-television-signal reception.

=== Nationwide channels ===
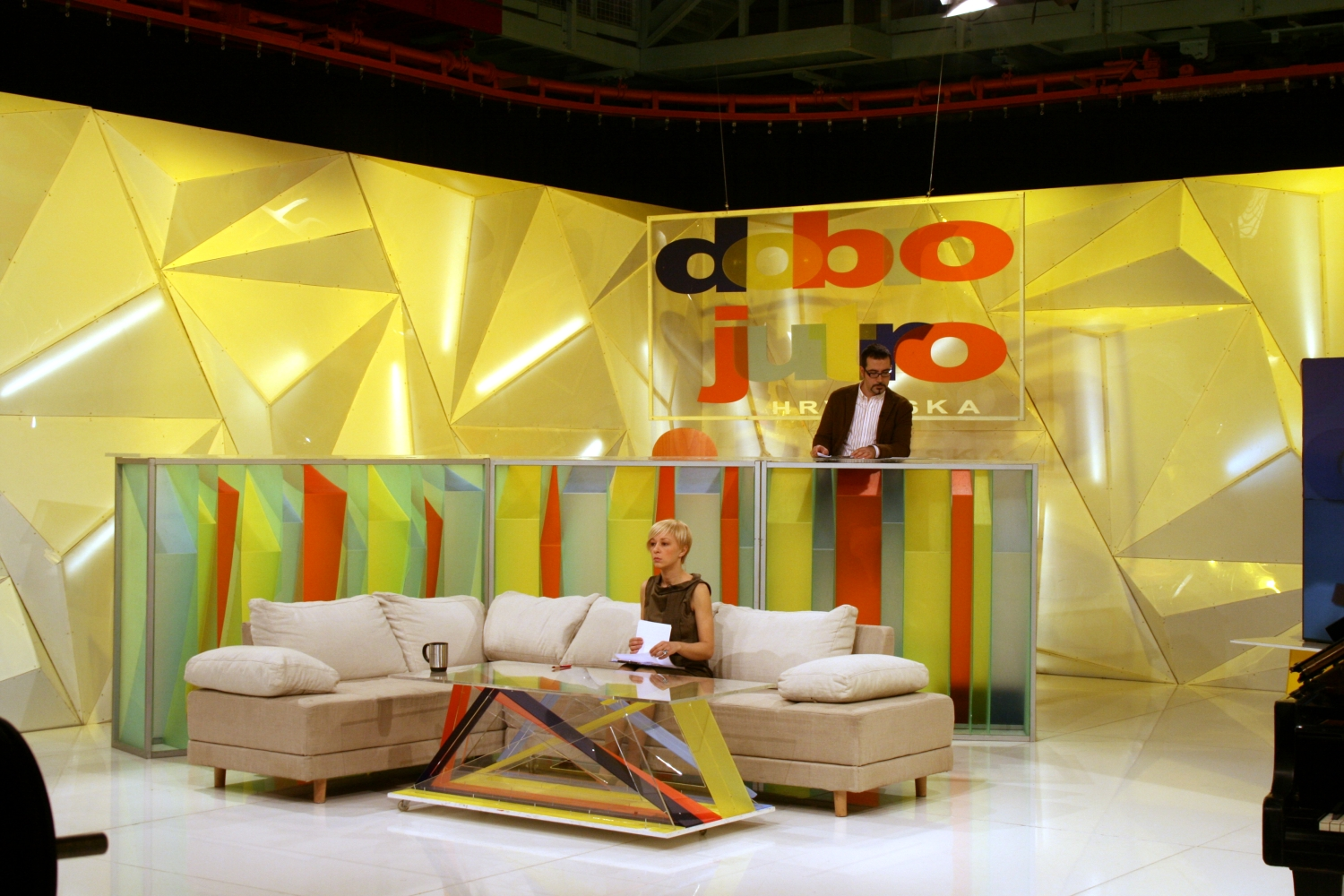
Studio set of HRT's morning show Dobro jutro Hrvatska in February 2008

As of May 2014, there are eleven nationwide free-to-air DVB-T television channels, with HRT's four channels, RTL Televizija operating three, Nova TV operating two and the remaining two operated by the Croatian Olympic Committee and Author d.o.o. companies and the government's Central State Administrative Office for e-Croatia. All ten DVB-T television channels are free-to-air and privately owned, except for HRT's channels and the Moja uprava channel (which are publicly owned broadcasters). Doma TV is part of the Nova TV group. Since 2007 television audience measurement is conducted by the Nielsen Company using 1,086 peoplemeters, and it is applied to terrestrial, cable and satellite TV. As of January 2012 HRT, RTL Televizija and Nova TV are using the service.

HRT 1, Nova TV and RTL Televizija channels' programmes are not specialized and comprise news, a variety of scripted and unscripted entertainment, as well as documentaries. HRT2, Doma TV and RTL 2 channels, carry similar type of programmes, except for absence of news. In addition, Croatian Radiotelevision is legally required to produce and broadcast programmes covering education of youths, aimed at the Croatian diaspora, national minorities in Croatia, preservation of cultural and natural heritage, protection of the environment, promotion of democracy and civil society, and support national production of films, television programme and music. Other nationwide channels are specialized providing informational programmes, covering sports or music.

Nationwide free-to-air DVB-T television channels in Croatia
Name	Owner	Programming	Type	Ratings (4+)	Year	MUX
HRT 1	Hrvatska radiotelevizija	General	Public broadcaster	17,83%	1956*	A
HRT 2	Hrvatska radiotelevizija	General	Public broadcaster	6,05%	1972*	A
HRT 3	Hrvatska radiotelevizija	Scientific Documentary Culture	Public broadcaster	1,78%	1988*	B
HRT 4	Hrvatska radiotelevizija	News	Public broadcaster	3,41%	2012*	B
Nova TV	Nova TV	General	Private channel	23,26%	2000	A
RTL	RTL Hrvatska	General	Private channel	13,40%	2004	A
Doma TV	Nova TV	Series	Private channel	5,48%	2011	B
RTL 2	RTL Hrvatska	Series	Private channel	4,29%	2011	B
SPTV	HOO TV	Sport	Private channel	0%	2011	D
RTL Kockica	RTL Hrvatska	Kids and Family	Private channel	2,70%	2014	D
CMC	Author	Music	Private channel	1,42%	2011	D
*Note: Until 1990 as JRT Television Zagreb

=== Regional and local channels ===
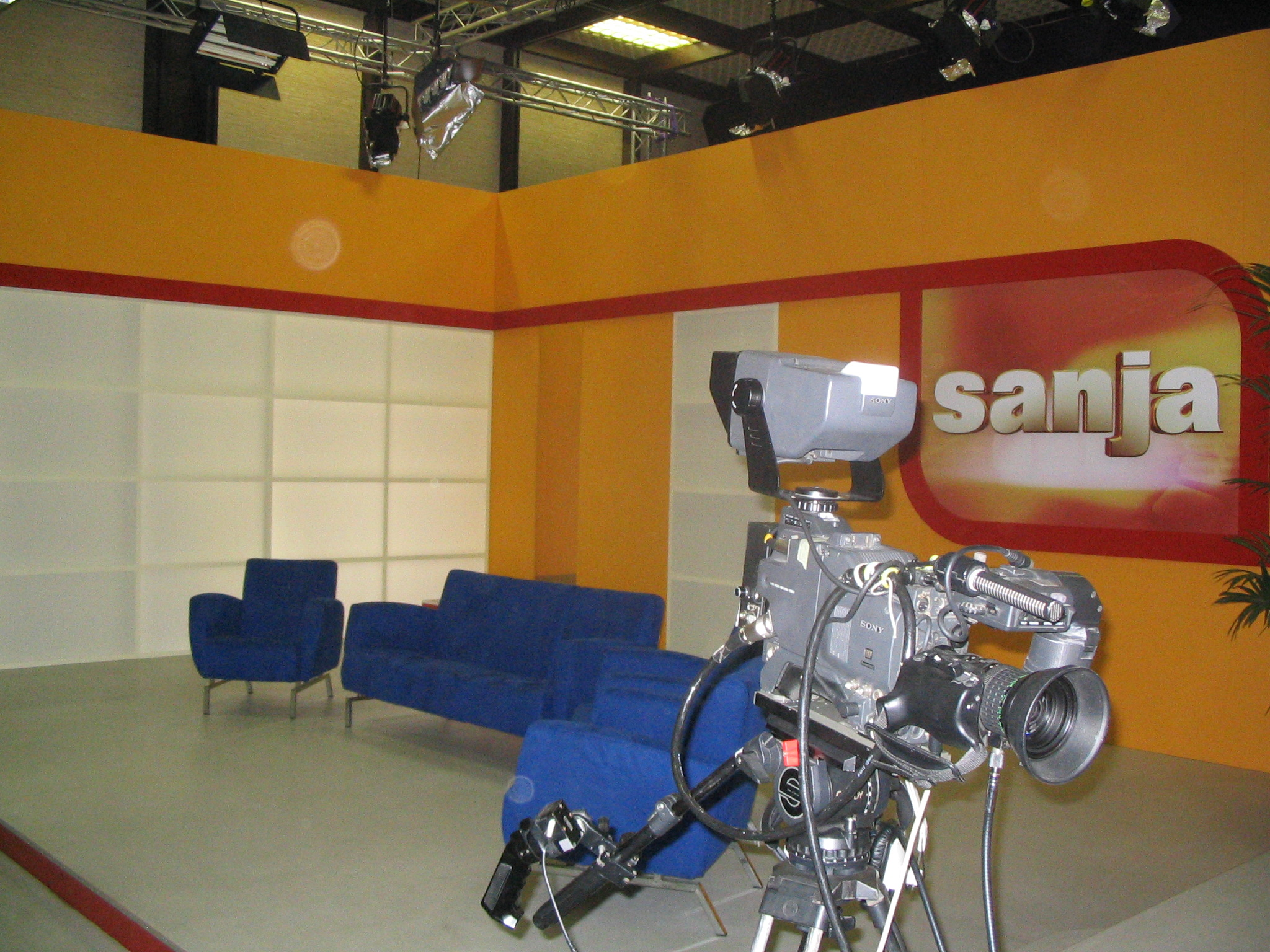
An RTL talk show studio

There are 21 regional (or local) DVB-T television channels operating in Croatia in MUX D. The number of channels broadcasting in individual regions varies from one to four, while some local DVB-T television local-allotment regions are vacant as of December 2011. Four regional (or local) television channels are broadcast in more than one allotment region. All regional and local channels are free-to-air. As of January 2012 Z1 televizija is measuring its audience with the Nielsen Company's peoplemeters for terrestrial, cable and satellite TV.

Regional and local free-to-air DVB-T television channels in Croatia
Name	Region	Programming	Type	Year
Plava Vinkovačka	D1	Regional	Private broadcaster	201?
Televizija Slavonije i Baranje (STV)	D1	Regional	Private broadcaster	1992
Osječka televizija	D1	Regional	Private broadcaster	2007
Slavonskobrodska televizija (SBTV)	D2	Regional	Private broadcaster	200?
Plava TV	D2	Regional	Private broadcaster	2017
Varaždinska televizija (VTV Varaždin)	D3	Regional	Private broadcaster	1999
OTV	D4	Regional	Private broadcaster	1989
BlueTV	D4	Regional	Private broadcaster	1996
Z1 Televizija (Z1)	D4	Regional	Private broadcaster	2002
Laudato TV	d44, d45, d46	Local	Private broadcaster	2015
Kanal RI	D5	Regional	Private broadcaster	1999
TV Nova Pula	D5	Regional	Private broadcaster	1996
Diadora TV	D7	Regional	Private broadcaster	2018
TV Jadran	D8	Regional	Private broadcaster	2001
Libertas TV	D9	Regional	Private broadcaster	2018
Televizija Zapad	L-ZA	Local	Private broadcaster	2009

=== HDTV and DVB-T2 ===
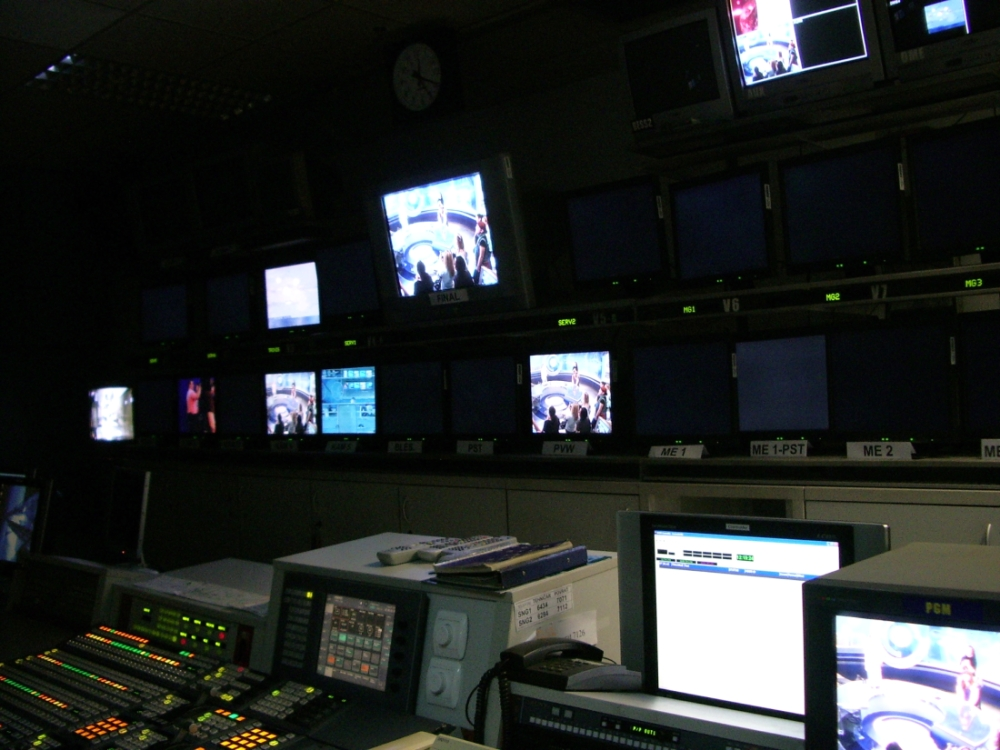
Television director's desk at HRT

Experimental high-definition television (HDTV) broadcasting began in Zagreb in March 2007; it was expanded to Split, Rijeka and Osijek in 2008. Experimental broadcasting in HD ended in February 2011. There were two experimental HDTV channels, operated by Croatian Radiotelevision and Nova TV. Pursuant to the digital television switchover developed by the Government of Croatia, broadcasting of DVB-T HDTV channels was conducted in MPEG-4. On 11 October 2011 experimental DVB-T2 broadcasting began in Zagreb, using H.264/MPEG-4 AVC coding and a conditional access system.

=== Multiplexes ===
There are three active multiplexes (MUX) in Croatia. MUX A and MUX B are reserved for nationwide channels, and MUX D is used for local and nationwide channels. MUX A broadcasts HRT 1, HRT 2, RTL and Nova TV channels. MUX B broadcasts HRT 3, HRT 4, RTL 2 and Doma TV. MUX D broadcasts three nationwide channels Sportska televizija (SPTV), RTL Kockica and Croatian Music Channel (CMC) in addition to local TV channels.

Competition for two channels in MUX B was announced in July 2010, and HAKOM received offers for the following channels: RTL 2, Doma TV, OBN and KN. Finally, licenses were given to RTL 2 and Doma TV. RTL2 and Doma TV began broadcasting on 2 January 2011. Licences for broadcasting in the national segment of Mux D were given to Croatian Music Channel (CMC), Sportska Televizija (owned by the Croatian Olympic Committee) and KN in December 2010. They started broadcasting in late March and early April 2011.

KN was originally broadcast in MUX B; as holder of a license for a testing period, they won an experimental 6-month period license (and later switched to MUX D, which carries both local and nationwide services simultaneously). MUX B also carries two new channels—HRT 3 and HRT 4. The two are expected to begin broadcasting by the end of 2012.

List of multiplexes
Allotment	Multiplex	Channel
D1	MUX M1 (channel 36)	HTV1 HD
D1	MUX M1 (channel 36)	HTV2 HD
D1	MUX M1 (channel 36)	RTL HD
D1	MUX M1 (channel 36)	NOVA TV HD
D1	MUX M1 (channel 36)	HRT3 HD
D1	MUX M1 (channel 36)	HRT4 HD
D1	MUX M1 (channel 36)	RTL 2 HD
D1	MUX M1 (channel 36)	Doma TV HD
D1	MUX M2 (channel 44)	Sportska televizija HD
D1	MUX M2 (channel 44)	RTL KOCKICA HD
D1	MUX M2 (channel 44)	CMC HD
D1	MUX M2 (channel 44)	Plava vinkovacka HD
D1	MUX M2 (channel 44)	STV HD
D1	MUX M2 (channel 44)	OSJECKA TV HD
D2	MUX M1 (channel 39)	HTV1 HD
D2	MUX M1 (channel 39)	HTV2 HD
D2	MUX M1 (channel 39)	RTL HD
D2	MUX M1 (channel 39)	NOVA TV HD
D2	MUX M1 (channel 39)	HRT3 HD
D2	MUX M1 (channel 39)	HRT4 HD
D2	MUX M1 (channel 39)	RTL 2 HD
D2	MUX M1 (channel 39)	Doma TV HD
D2	MUX M2 (channel 43)	Sportska televizija HD
D2	MUX M2 (channel 43)	RTL KOCKICA HD
D2	MUX M2 (channel 43)	CMC HD
D2	MUX M2 (channel 43)	SBTV HD
D2	MUX M2 (channel 43)	Plava TV HD
D3	MUX M1 (channel 25)	HTV1 HD
D3	MUX M1 (channel 25)	HTV2 HD
D3	MUX M1 (channel 25)	RTL HD
D3	MUX M1 (channel 25)	NOVA TV HD
D3	MUX M1 (channel 25)	HRT3 HD
D3	MUX M1 (channel 25)	HRT4 HD
D3	MUX M1 (channel 25)	RTL 2 HD
D3	MUX M1 (channel 25)	Doma TV HD
D3	MUX M2 (channel 34)	Sportska televizija HD
D3	MUX M2 (channel 34)	RTL KOCKICA HD
D3	MUX M2 (channel 34)	CMC HD
D3	MUX M2 (channel 34)	VTV VARAZDIN
D4	MUX M1 (channel 25)	HTV1 HD
D4	MUX M1 (channel 25)	HTV2 HD
D4	MUX M1 (channel 25)	RTL HD
D4	MUX M1 (channel 25)	NOVA TV HD
D4	MUX M1 (channel 25)	HRT3 HD
D4	MUX M1 (channel 25)	HRT4 HD
D4	MUX M1 (channel 25)	RTL 2 HD
D4	MUX M1 (channel 25)	Doma TV HD
D4	MUX M2 (channel 40)	Sportska televizija HD
D4	MUX M2 (channel 40)	RTL KOCKICA HD
D4	MUX M2 (channel 40)	CMC HD
D4	MUX M2 (channel 40)	OTV HD
D4	MUX M2 (channel 40)	MrezaZG HD
D4	MUX M2 (channel 40)	Z1 HD
d44-d45-d46	MUX L1 (channel 22)	Laudato TV HD
D5	MUX M1 (channel 28)	HTV1 HD
D5	MUX M1 (channel 28)	HTV2 HD
D5	MUX M1 (channel 28)	RTL HD
D5	MUX M1 (channel 28)	NOVA TV HD
D5	MUX M1 (channel 28)	HRT3 HD
D5	MUX M1 (channel 28)	HRT4 HD
D5	MUX M1 (channel 28)	RTL 2 HD
D5	MUX M1 (channel 28)	Doma TV HD
D5	MUX M2 (channel 23)	Sportska televizija HD
D5	MUX M2 (channel 23)	RTL KOCKICA HD
D5	MUX M2 (channel 23)	CMC HD
D5	MUX M2 (channel 23)	KANAL RI HD
D5	MUX M2 (channel 23)	TV NOVA HD
D6	MUX M1 (channel 30)	HTV1 HD
D6	MUX M1 (channel 30)	HTV2 HD
D6	MUX M1 (channel 30)	RTL HD
D6	MUX M1 (channel 30)	NOVA TV HD
D6	MUX M1 (channel 30)	HRT3 HD
D6	MUX M1 (channel 30)	HRT4 HD
D6	MUX M1 (channel 30)	RTL 2 HD
D6	MUX M1 (channel 30)	Doma TV HD
D6	MUX M2 (channel 46)	Sportska televizija HD
D6	MUX M2 (channel 46)	RTL KOCKICA HD
D6	MUX M2 (channel 46)	CMC HD
D7	MUX M1 (channel 51)	HTV1 HD
D7	MUX M1 (channel 51)	HTV2 HD
D7	MUX M1 (channel 51)	RTL HD
D7	MUX M1 (channel 51)	NOVA TV HD
D7	MUX M1 (channel 51)	HRT3 HD
D7	MUX M1 (channel 51)	HRT4 HD
D7	MUX M1 (channel 51)	RTL 2 HD
D7	MUX M1 (channel 51)	Doma TV HD
D7	MUX M2 (channel 22)	Sportska televizija HD
D7	MUX M2 (channel 22)	RTL KOCKICA HD
D7	MUX M2 (channel 22)	CMC HD
D7	MUX M2 (channel 22)	DIADORA TV HD
D8	MUX M1 (channel 33)	HTV1 HD
D8	MUX M1 (channel 33)	HTV2 HD
D8	MUX M1 (channel 33)	RTL HD
D8	MUX M1 (channel 33)	NOVA TV HD
D8	MUX M1 (channel 33)	HRT3 HD
D8	MUX M1 (channel 33)	HRT4 HD
D8	MUX M1 (channel 33)	RTL 2 HD
D8	MUX M1 (channel 33)	Doma TV HD
D8	MUX M2 (channel 53)	Sportska televizija HD
D8	MUX M2 (channel 53)	RTL KOCKICA HD
D8	MUX M2 (channel 53)	CMC HD
D8	MUX M2 (channel 53)	TV JADRAN HD
D8	MUX M2 (channel 53)	TELEVIZIJA DALMACIJA HD
D9	MUX M1 (channel 21)	HTV1 HD
D9	MUX M1 (channel 21)	HTV2 HD
D9	MUX M1 (channel 21)	RTL HD
D9	MUX M1 (channel 21)	NOVA TV HD
D9	MUX M1 (channel 21)	HRT3 HD
D9	MUX M1 (channel 21)	HRT4 HD
D9	MUX M1 (channel 21)	RTL 2 HD
D9	MUX M1 (channel 21)	Doma TV HD
D9	MUX M2 (channel 59)	Sportska televizija HD
D9	MUX M2 (channel 59)	RTL KOCKICA HD
D9	MUX M2 (channel 59)	CMC HD
D9	MUX M2 (channel 59)	Libertas TV HD
L-ZA	MUX L (channel 43)	TELEVIZIJA ZAPAD

== IPTV, cable and satellite television ==
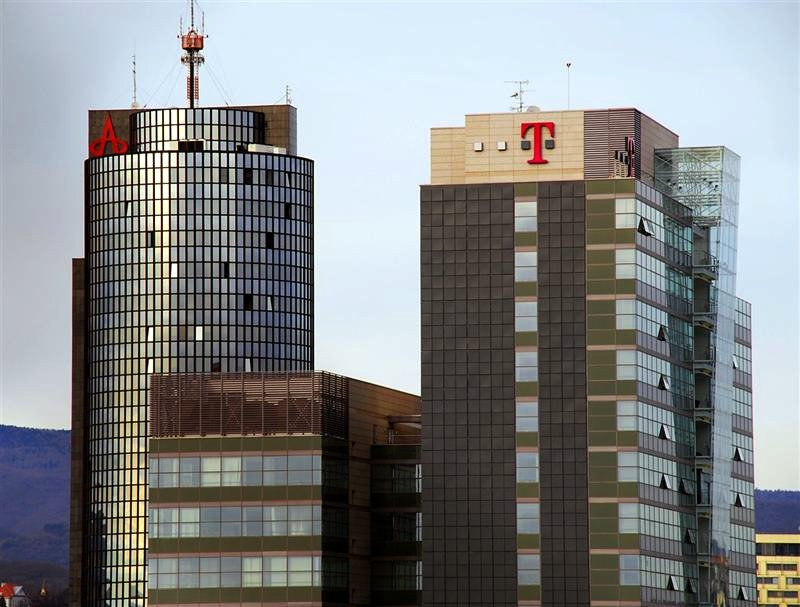
Headquarters of T-Hrvatski Telekom (T-HT), the largest IPTV provider in Croatia

IPTV is recording rapid market growth; between 2009 and 2010, the number of households subscribed to an IPTV service grew by 23 percent to nearly 300,000. In terms of IPTV density Croatia is the fifth-ranked market in the world, trailing only Singapore, Hong Kong, Cyprus and Estonia. The number rose further by the third quarter of 2011 to a total of 349,138 households, representing 23.6 percent of Croatian households. At the same time there were 144,439 households with cable television connections and 104,635 households with satellite television reception (representing 9.8 and 7.1 percent of households in Croatia, respectively). The leading IPTV provider in Croatia is T-Hrvatski Telekom (T-HT) with its MaxTV service, while A1 Hrvatska (until 1 October 2018 Vipnet)-owned B.net is the leading cable-television provider in the country (since 1 October 2018 B.net has become part of A1 IPTV). Since 2009, some providers offer HDTV reception of IPTV channels. Other IPTV providers include Optima, Iskon (owned by T-HT), Amis etc. The IPTV and satellite-TV (Maxtv SAT, A1 SAT, Total TV etc.) providers normally carry all channels otherwise available in DVB-T, with additional channels (produced in Croatia and abroad) available through various subscription plans. A significant proportion of the foreign channels are localized through dubbing (rarely) or subtitles. The two largest IPTV and cable TV providers offer 31 channels produced in Croatia (or specifically for Croatia), in addition to those broadcasting in DVB-T. Viewership of cable and satellite TV channels broadcast by HRT, RTL, Nova TV and Z1 Televizija is measured by Nielsen Company peoplemeters.

Croatian IPTV/cable/satellite TV only channels:
Name	Programming
Arena Sport 1	Sport
Arena Sport 2	Sport
Arena Sport 3	Sport
Arena Sport 4	Sport
Arena Sport 5	Sport
Arena Sport 6	Sport
Arena Sport 7	Sport
Arena Sport 8	Sport
Arena Sport 9	Sport
Arena Sport 10	Sport
GP1	Sport
Fight Channel	Sport
Jugoton TV	Music
DMC TV	Music
Kino TV	Movie
Cinestar Action and Thriller	Entertainment & Lifestyle
Cinestar Premiere 1 & 2	Movie
CineStar TV	Entertainment & Lifestyle
Full TV	Business
Hit TV	Music
Kanal 5	Regional
Klasik TV	Entertainment & Lifestyle
MediaTravel.tv	Documentary
Mini Nova	Children
Orlando TV	Children
Orlando Kids	Children
Narodna Televizija	Music
RTL Crime	Series
RTL Passion	Series
RTL Living	Series
Saborska televizija	Parliament TV
Top Shop TV	Infomercial
Večernji.hr	News
Zdrava TV-7	Entertainment & Lifestyle
Viasat History	Documentaries
N1	News
Viasat Explore	Documentaries
Viasat Nature	Documentaries
National Geographic	Documentaries
History 1 and 2	Documentaries
National Geographic Wild	Documentaries
Discovery Channel	Documentaries
TLC	Entertainment & Lifestyle
Animal Planet	Documentaries
RT	News
CNN	News
Klasik TV	Old Yugoslav Movies
TV 1000	Movies
Euronews	News
Star Channel	Movies
Star Crime	Movies
Star Life	Movies
HBO	Movies
Cinemax	Movies
AMC	Movies
Nickelodeon	Childrens
Cartoon Network	Childrens
Cartoonito	Childrens
MTV	Music

=== Dedicated satellite channels ===
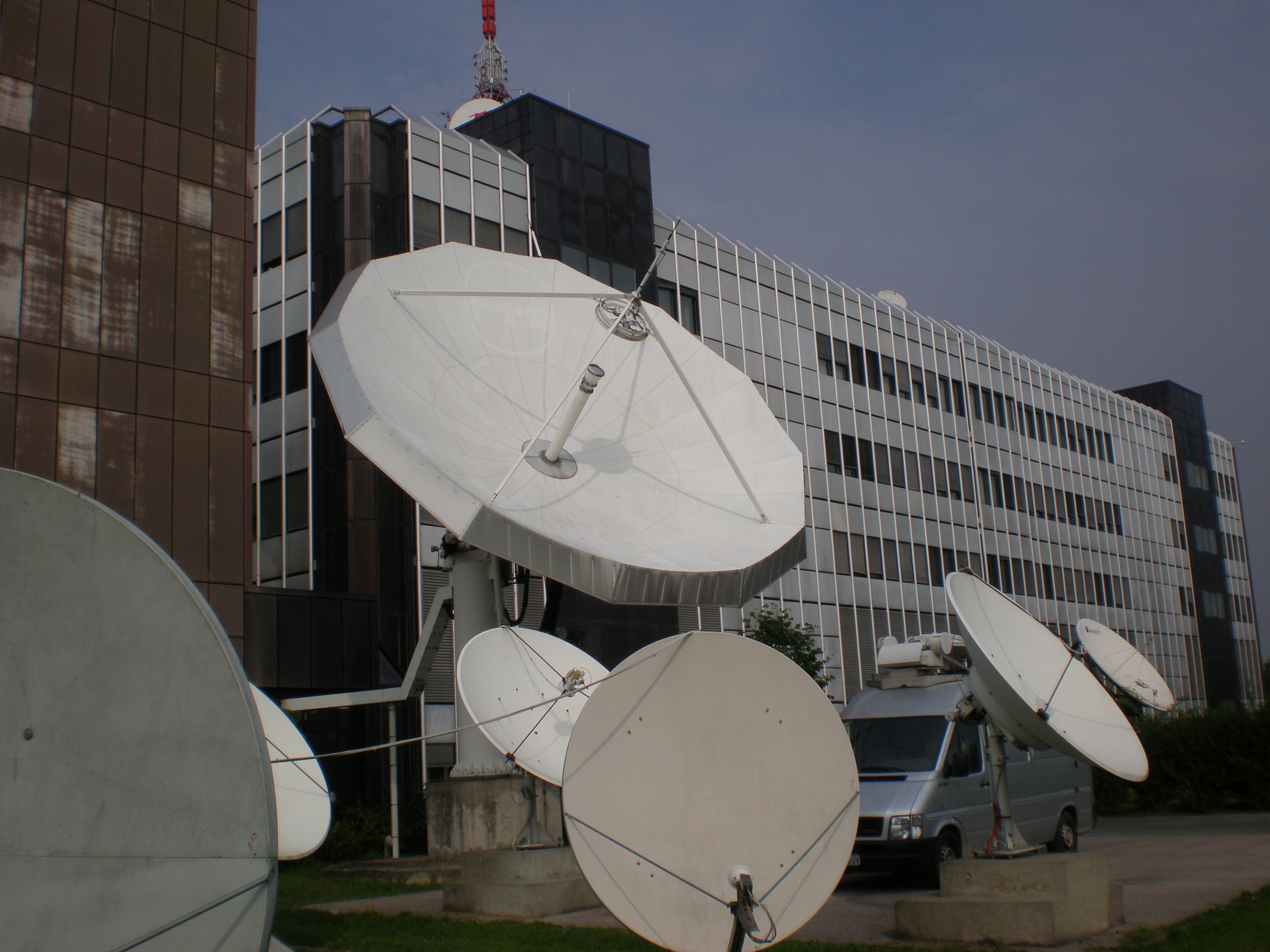
Satellite dishes at the HRT building in Zagreb

HRT broadcasts dedicated satellite channels for Europe and the Middle East, North and South America, Australia and New Zealand; viewing the channels requires a subscription. Channels broadcast to Europe and the Middle East via the Eutelsat 16A satellite (using Viaccess conditional access) are HRT 1, HRT 2, HRT 3 and HRT 4. The satellite channels are also used to transmit three free-to-air radio channels produced by HRT.

Croatian satellite channels:
Name		Programming	Area	Encryption	Satellite
HRT 1 (Hrvatska Radio TV 1)	Hrvatska TV1.png	General	Europe and Middle East	FTA/Viaccess 3.0	Eutelsat 16A
HRT 2 (Hrvatska Radio TV 2)	Hrvatska TV2.png	General	Europe and Middle East	Viaccess 3.0	Eutelsat 16A
HRT 3 (Hrvatska Radio TV 3)	Hrvatska TV3.png	Scientific Documentary Culture	Europe and Middle East	Viaccess 3.0	Eutelsat 16A
HRT 4 (Hrvatska Radio TV 4)		News	Europe and Middle East	FTA/Viaccess 3.0	Eutelsat 16A

== Market regulation ==
The television industry in Croatia is regulated by the Croatian Regulatory Authority for Network Industries (HAKOM). HAKOM was established by the Electronic Communications Act of 26 June 2008; pursuant to Article 5 of the act, HAKOM is tasked with promoting and safeguarding market competition and the interests of service users in the field of electronic communication services and infrastructure, while contributing to the development of the internal market of the European Union. HAKOM's goals include ensuring sustainable development of the electronic communications market at affordable prices for consumers, providing fair conditions for return on investment in the market and contributing to the quality of life in Croatia. Further regulation of the television is performed by the Electronic Media Council, which enacts mandatory regulation applying to both state-run and privately owned broadcasters based in Croatia. One such regulation, aimed at protection of minors, restricts depictions of violence, sexual intercourse, profanity, use of intoxicating substances and tobacco and other scenes which may be harmful to development of minors between seven in the morning and nine, ten or eleven in the evening, depending on rating of specific programme—advising that the programme is not suitable for persons under 12, 15 or 18 years of age respectively. The restriction does not apply to educational, documentary, science or news programming.

HAKOM grants, evaluates and revokes broadcast licenses for all forms of electronic communications in Croatia, approves mergers of communications-industry companies, imposes fines on those who are found to be in breach of applicable regulation and conducts constant supervision of the industry.

== Language localisation ==
National legislation requires that all television programmes broadcasts in Croatia are made in Croatian or with appropriate translations either using dubbing or subtitling. In general, all foreign programming is subtitled, except for cartoons and narrated parts of documentaries and similar programmes. An attempt to change this was made by Nova TV in 2006, when a soap opera was dubbed, but the move provoked negative response from viewers and critics, causing the experiment to be abandoned. The legislation does not provide for mutually intelligible languages. That led to formal requests made by the Electronic Media Council demanding language localisation of television programmes made in Serbian. Ultimately, that issue was resolved through subtitling using teletext service normally used for closed captioning.

== Social impact ==
Television in Croatia, as all other media in the country are criticized for lack of balance of global issues and trends on one hand and national topics covered on the other. All major television networks in Croatia are generally thought to be under excessive influence of commercialism. This is viewed through international ownership structures of the privately owned television broadcasters having little regard for promotion of national culture and social issues, as well as through efforts of the state-run HRT to attract advertisers through programming that is thought to appeal to the viewers the best in spite of regulation of programming content and restricted advertising at HRT. The HRT is limited by a special legislation regulating that broadcaster to four minutes of advertising in prime time period between 6 and 10 in the evening. On the other hand, HRT receives income from a fee charged to owners of television sets in Croatia in the amount of 1.5% of average monthly net wage in Croatia. In 2012, the fee charged is 80 kunas (c. 10.60 Euros). In 2010, annual income of HRT generated by the fee amounted to 1.2 billion kunas (c. 160 million Euros).

Even though social impact of television in Croatia is considered to be imperfect and that of variable quality, television is important in the society because it offers a way for non-governmental organizations to communicate their concerns to the public and to criticize the government and other aspects of politics of Croatia. Television is the most widespread source of information in Croatia—on average 57% of the population of Croatia uses television as their primary source of information. That percentage varies significantly by geographic region—from 43% in Zagreb and areas surrounding the capital to 79% in Slavonia—but in every region it surpasses all other sources of information, the second most widely used source of information being the Internet averaging at 19%. In 2014 there were 1.755 million registered television sets in the country.

Population using television as their primary source of information
Geographic region	Population percentage
Slavonia	79%
Lika, Kordun, Banovina	63%
Northern Croatia	61%
Northern Croatian Littoral	59%
Dalmatia	47%
Zagreb and surrounding areas	43%
Average	57%

== Former Channels ==
- Velebit TV - Gospić along from Čakovec
- TVI - Pazin
- K5 - Split
- CBS Reality
- HRT Plus
- Mreža
- Splitska Televizija
- TV Marjan

== See also ==
- List of Croatian language television channels
- Media of Croatia
