= List of Kud puklo da puklo (TV series) characters =

This is a list of characters from the television series Kud puklo da puklo (Whichever Way the Ball Bounces), a Croatian comedy telenovela produced by Nova TV.

== Main characters ==
Character	Actor	Seasons	
Character	Actor	1	2
Katarina Gavran	Mirna Medaković	Main	Main
Damir Gavran	Momčilo Otašević	Main	Main
Mile Gavran	Milan Štrljić	Main	Main
Stipe Žulj	Miodrag Krivokapić	Main	Main
LJubo Žulj	Stjepan Perić	Main	
Josip Tepavac	Asim Ugljen	Main	Main
Barbara Murgić	Ecija Ojdanić	Main	Main
Sveto Tepavac	Žarko Radić	Main	Main
Krešimir Kolarić	Janko Popović Volarić	Main	Main
Tomislav Mamić	Miran Kurspahić	Main	Main
Ane Jelaska	Barbara Vicković	Main	Main
Zdenka Gavran	Suzana Nikolić	Main	Main
Snježana Mamić	Jagoda Kumrić	Main	Main
Diana Tepavac	Tijana Pečenčić	Main	Main
Milica Mamić	Sanja Vejnović	Main	Main
Marko Došen	Željko Pervan	Main	Main
Don Mirko Komadina	Ivan Herceg	Main	
Višnja Došen	Vesna Tominac	Main	Main
Miranda Žeravica	Jelena Perčin		Main
Dario Žeravica	Vladimir Posavec-Tušek		Main
Sara Žeravica	Katja Rožmarić		Main
Tina Božić	Monika Mihajlović		Main
Mate Božić	Petar Burić		Main

== Recurring characters ==
Character	Actor	Seasons	
Character	Actor	1	2
Don Ante Rukavina	Slavko Juraga	Recurring	Recurring
Vjekoslav Bokarica	Robert Ugrina	Recurring	Recurring
Zlatko Bokarica	Igor Hamer	Recurring	Recurring
Srećko Vrbota	Saša Anočić	Recurring	Recurring
Ivka Crnjak-Baburić	LJubica Jović	Recurring	
dr. Denis Osvaldić	Mislav Čavajda	Recurring	
Old mrs. Milka	Edita Karađole	Recurring	
Old mrs. Ika	Asja Jovanović		Recurring
Stanislav Tokić	Ranko Zidarić		Recurring
Suzana Žeravica	Sandra Lončarić		Recurring
