= Kud puklo da puklo season 1 =

Kud puklo da puklo
- Season 1
- No. of episodes: 171

Release
- Original network: Nova TV
- Original release: 15 September 2014 – 7 June 2015

Season chronology
- Next → Season 2

The first season of Kud puklo da puklo premiered on 15 September 2014 and ended on 7 June 2015 on Nova TV.

== Overview ==
This season contains 171 episodes and stars Mirna Medaković, Momčilo Otašević, Milan Štrljić, Miodrag Krivokapić, Stjepan Perić, Asim Ugljen, Ecija Ojdanić, Žarko Radić, Janko Popović Volarić, Miran Kurspahić, Barbara Vicković, Suzana Nikolić, Jagoda Kumrić, Tijana Pečenčić, Sanja Vejnović, Željko Pervan, Ivan Herceg and Vesna Tominac who joined the cast. Stjepan Perić and Ivan Herceg departed the cast at the end of season.

== Cast ==
Character	Actor	Occurs
Katarina Došen	Mirna Medaković	Entire season
Damir Gavran	Momčilo Otašević	Entire season
Mile Gavran	Milan Štrljić	Entire season
Stipe Žilj	Miodrag Krivokapić	Entire season
LJubo Žulj	Stjepan Perić	Entire season
Josip Tepavac	Asim Ugljen	Entire season
Barbara Murgić	Ecija Ojdanić	Entire season
Sveto Tepavac	Žarko Radić	Entire season
Krešimir Kolarić	Janko Popović Volarić	Entire season
Tomislav Mamić	Miran Kurspahić	Entire season
Ane Jelaska	Barbara Vicković	Entire season
Zdenka Gavran	Suzana Nikolić	Entire season
Snježana Jelaska	Jagoda Kumrić	Entire season
Diana Murgić	Tijana Pečenčić	Entire season
Milica Mamić	Sanja Vejnović	Entire season
Marko Došen	Željko Pervan	Entire season
don Mirko Komadina	Ivan Herceg	Entire season
Višnja Došen	Vesna Tominac	Entire season

== Episodes ==
No. overall	No. in season	Title	Original release date
1	1	"Granpa's death"	15 September 2014
When old Đuro Došen died, his grandchildren, Katarina, Kreso and Tomislav, came to village on reading of a will. Lawyer informed them with the presence of Mile and reverend Mirko that Đuro left million euros, but on the condition that they be in village one year or the money goes to the village. First appearance of Katarina Došen, Damir Gavran, Mile Gavran, Stipe Žulj, Ljubo Žulj, Josip Tepavac, Barbara Murgić, Sveto Tepavac, Krešimir Kolarić, Tomislav Mamić, Ane Jelaska, Zdenka Gavran, Snježana Jelaska, Diana Murgić, Milica Mamić, Marko Došen, don Mirko Komadina and Višnja Došen.
2	2	"The Will"	16 September 2014
The villagers can't believe how Đuro got million euros. The grandchildren trying to fit in village, but the villagers aren't very friendly to them.
3	3	"In the race for inheritance"	17 September 2014
4	4	"The Video"	18 September 2014
5	5	"The Globe"	19 September 2014
6	6	"Spiritual Exercises"	22 September 2014
Barbara sends Diana, Snježana, Damir, Josip, and Ljubo on spiritual exercises with reverend Mirko, but the youth isn’t very enthusiastic about it. Meanwhile, Krešo’s wife Renata arrives in the village with their children.
7	7	"The Chase for Katarina"	23 September 2014
8	8	"The Tattoo"	24 September 2014
9	9	"The Birthrate"	25 September 2014
10	10	"The Set for the Dance"	26 September 2014
11	11	"The Dance and the Statue"	29 September 2014
12	12	"In the Chase for the Statue"	30 September 2014
13	13	"New Member in the Board"	1 October 2014
14	14	"The Proposal"	2 October 2014
15	15	"Hund"	3 October 2014
16	16	"The Wedding near the Globe"	6 October 2014
17	17	"In the Otter Hunt"	7 October 2014
18	18	"The Bride and the Groom"	8 October 2014
19	19	"The Poacher"	9 October 2014
20	20	"The Set for the Campaign"	10 October 2014
21	21	"Political Meeting"	13 October 2014
22	22	"The Confrontation - Part I -"	14 October 2014
23	23	"The Confrontation - Part II -"	15 October 2014
24	24	"Snježana's New Boyfriend"	16 October 2014
In the midst of the election for the president of the board, election silence takes place, and Mile and Barbara anxiously await the voting results.
25	25	"The Elections"	17 October 2014
When the votes are counted, everyone is shocked as Josip and Damir discover that Barbara has won. Mile is even more stunned when he realizes that he lost because of Zdenka’s vote.
26	26	"Barbara's Governance"	20 October 2014
27	27	"Sveta's Problem"	21 October 2014
28	28	"Stipe and Mile"	22 October 2014
29	29	"In the Jail"	23 October 2014
30	30	"Regulation"	24 October 2014
As her first move as president, Barbara implements a regulation requiring all houses to have well-maintained gardens, which displeases many villagers.
31	31	"For Mande"	27 October 2014
Reverend Mirko warns old Mrs. Mande that she should not be working so hard at her age. When she later dies while tending her garden, Mile and Sveto organize her funeral, during which they overthrow Barbara as president.
32	32	"The Return of the Statue"	28 October 2014
Reverend Ante blackmails Damir and Josip into retrieving "The Lady" statue in exchange for freeing Katarina from jail.
33	33	"The Place in the Board"	29 October 2014
34	34	"The Revenge"	30 October 2014
Damir, Josip i Ljubo odlučuju se osvetiti Tomislavu tako što ga vežu za drvo u šumi. No, Tomislav se uspije osloboditi i izgubi se.
35	35	"The Search"	31 October 2014
Milica se vraća u Oštrovac i pokreće potragu za Tomislavom, koji se izgubio u šumi. Damir, Josip i Ljubo priznaju Snježani što su učinili.
36	36	"Grandchildren vs. Village"	3 November 2014
Katarina, Krešo i Tomislav započinju rat protiv sela, posebno protiv stare gospođe Milke. Tijekom noći, provaljuju u njezinu kuću, a Tomislav zaboravlja zatvoriti vrata štale, pa krava pobjegne.
37	37	"Cow & Boar"	4 November 2014
Milka poziva Gogu iz Krasinca da provjeri njezinu kravu, koja se prejela djeteline. U međuvremenu, u selo dolazi divlja svinja, a Sveto alarmira sve mještane.
38	38	"War & Peace"	5 November 2014
39	39	"The Bullfight"	6 November 2014
Selo se natječe protiv Marka, Kreše i Katarine na koridi kako bi osvojili rogove jelena. Sveto prekida borbu upozoravajući na svinju u selu, ali Marko misli da to radi jer se boji poraza.
40	40	"The Celebration"	7 November 2014
41	41	"Goga's Intrigue"	10 November 2014
42	42	"The Chief Inspector and The Other Stories"	11 November 2014
Ljubo prima vijest iz Zagreba da je položio ispit za inspektora i obavještava Stipu da odlazi. Stipe je sretan, ali Mile je zabrinut jer će selo pasti pod nadležnost Krasinca.
43	43	"The Sign of Love"	12 November 2014
44	44	"Accident"	13 November 2014
45	45	"It Went Ljubo"	14 November 2014
Ljubo odlazi u Zagreb i oprašta se od svih. Damir i Josip istovremeno su sretni i tužni zbog njega.
46	46	"The Tax Inspection - Part I -"	17 November 2014
U Svetinu trgovinu dolazi inspekcija i izriče mu kaznu. Sveto doživljava srčani udar i završava u bolnici.
47	47	"The Tax Inspection - Part II -"	18 November 2014
Cijelo selo misli da je Mile pozvao inspekciju. On se kune da nije kriv, ali mu nitko ne vjeruje, pa čak ni Zdenka.
48	48	"The Tax Inspection - Part III -"	19 November 2014
Don Mirko saznaje tko je pozvao inspekciju i pokušava nagovoriti tu osobu da prizna, no ona odbija.
49	49	"The Tax Inspection - Part IV -"	20 November 2014
Sveto konačno otkriva da je Barbara ta koja je prijavila njegovu trgovinu i ne može se pomiriti s tim.
50	50	"Unmoral Acts"	24 November 2014
51	51	"The Letter"	25 November 2014
Damir's grandmother came to the village, but accidentally she came to Djura's house. Katarina helped her to go to Mile's house. Damir's grandmother Ivka said that she wants Damir to take her to her sweetheart from youth, the ship captain Šime.
52	52	"The Border - Part I -"	26 November 2014
Krešo found out that Djura's house is on the border between Oštrovac and Krasinac. Marko made a plan how to profit from that.
53	53	"The Border - Part II -"	27 November 2014
Marko negotiates with old Mrs. Milka from Oštrovac and Reverend Ante from Krasinac about where he is going to report the whereabouts. The plan later falls through.
54	54	"The Chase"	28 November 2014
55	55	"When Luck Turns You Back"	1 December 2014
56	56	"The Decision"	2 December 2014
Sveto called the inspection in the school to get revenge on Barbara for calling the inspection on his shop.
57	57	"The School"	3 December 2014
When old Mrs. Milka found out what Sveto did, she tells him to persuade Barbara and the inspector not to close the school, or the village will be subject to Krasinac.
58	58	"Bachelor Party"	4 December 2014
Goga tells Damir that she is pregnant, so he starts to arrange a wedding and goes with Stipe, Mile, and Josip on a bachelor party.
59	59	"The Hoax"	5 December 2014
Reverend Mirko found out that the baby isn't Damir's, but Nediljko's; he tries to persuade Goga to tell Damir, but she refuses.
60	60	"The Gifts for The Newlyweds"	8 December 2014
Goga's brothers, Vjeko and Mrki, and Mile negotiate about the dowry and agree that the dowry will be the money, not the presents.
61	61	"Goga and Nediljko - Part I -"	9 December 2014
Goga admitted to Damir that the baby isn't his, but Nediljko's. Damir and Goga make a plan to take her and Nediljko out of the village.
62	62	"Goga and Nediljko - Part II -"	10 December 2014
Mile found out about the plan, so he agrees with them. The false wedding is going to start, but Reverend Ante tells Vjeko and Mrki to stay with the bride all the time.
63	63	"Goga and Nediljko - Part III -"	11 December 2014
The false wedding is interrupted when Reverend Ante asks if anyone has something against the wedding. Mile and Nediljko answer that they do. Nediljko and Goga, with the help of Damir and Katarina, run away from the village.
64	64	"The Local Board"	12 December 2014
65	65	"The Above"	15 December 2014
66	66	"The Break"	16 December 2014
Katarina decides to break up with Denis, but he refuses to accept it.
67	67	"The Rivals"	17 December 2014
Denis and Milica come to the village to make Katarina change her mind, but soon Denis and Damir become rivals for Katarina's affection, and she doesn't know what to do.
68	68	"The Solution is Katarina"	18 December 2014
Katarina doesn't know what to do, so she asks Reverend Mirko for advice. He tells her that the answer is within herself. Katarina decides to return to Zagreb.
69	69	"Operation "Katarina""	23 December 2014
Damir, Denis, and Reverend Mirko go to Zagreb to bring Katarina back to the village. First, Denis tries to persuade her, but he fails. Later, Damir succeeds in returning Katarina to Oštrovac through deception.
70	70	"Oštrovac Resistance"	24 December 2014
71	71	"The Turnover of Situation"	25 December 2014
OCCOC comes to the village to find Krešo because of something he didn't do. He admits to Katarina about that.
72	72	"The Bishop"	26 December 2014
The Bishop comes to the village at Reverend Ante's request to check Reverend Mirko, so Mile, Josip, Stipe, and Diana make a plan to make Reverend Mirko appear to be a good priest.
73	73	"Mirko & His Lover - Part I -"	29 December 2014
Reverend Ante, with Barbara's help, brings "evidence" that Reverend Mirko has a lover, and the Bishop tells Mirko that he is being transferred to another village.
74	74	"Mirko & His Lover - Part II -"	30 December 2014
Katarina and Reverend Mirko tell the Bishop that Reverend Ante framed Mirko with false evidence of having a lover, so the Bishop removes Reverend Ante from the ranks of priests.
75	75	"The President of the Board"	31 December 2014
Mile organizes a selection for the new president of the board, but no one wants to be president due to OCCOC.
76	76	"The OCCOC -Part I-"	19 January 2015
The OCCOC returnes to Oštrovac to find Krešo, and he is going in hiding. Katarina fussing OCCOC in hiding him.
77	77	"The OCCOC -Part II-"	20 January 2015
The OCCOC is still in Oštrovac and they brought Renata to help in finding Krešo who is now hiding in the forest. She tells him all about the OCCOC.
78	78	"Krešal"	21 January 2015
Mile and Sveto blackmailed Krešo to cage Katarina and Tomislav on 24 hours somewhere so that the village gets the money. Damir free Katarina and Tomislav, and by accident, Krešo are arrested.
79	79	"Ane for the president"	22 January 2015
After the events with Krešo, Ane is selected for the new president of the Board.
80	80	"The Restaurant -Part I-"	26 January 2015
Katarina and Tomislav open a new restaurant in Oštrovac and Ane gets a competition.
81	81	"The Restaurant -Part II-"	27 January 2015
Snježana sets up frog's legs in Djura's house, so Damir built the ticket to Katarina in the presence of Ane. Sveto's sister Ruža came back in Oštrovac with her fourth husband Jakov "Jack" Prka and they go in hunt, and Jack is accidentally shot by Ruža.
82	82	"With Jack in the hunt"	28 January 2015
83	83	"Cook & Widow"	29 January 2015
Jack recovers and Sveto revealed Ruža's secret to him, and Jack worries about himself and leaves Ruža. Tomislav started his cooking business in restaurant.
84	84	"Doctor in the Park"	2 February 2015
Katarina gets the job in the park as a park doctor. Someone called inspection in Tomislav's restaurant.
85	85	"Who Called The Inspection?"	3 February 2015
In Ane's restaurant came the inspector Križanac and tell that the call for Ane's restaurant and Tomislav's restaurant came from the same phone. Marko got it that Tomislav called inspection.
86	86	"Ruža's Plan"	4 February 2015
Jack brought Ruža papers for the divorce. Later Ruža made a plan how to get the money. With Mile's and Ane's help she launched petition for closing a park.
87	87	"In The Eve of Beauty Contest"	5 February 2015
Duško Šimac returnes to village to photo some kuna's for the calendar, but Damir persuade him to devise a beauty contest. Katarina signed for the contest.
88	88	"Miss -Part I-"	9 February 2015
The Beauty contest started and in the jury entered Sveto, reverend Mirko and Josip.
89	89	"Miss -Part II-"	10 February 2015
Ane interrupted the beauty contest when she saw what Snježana is doing. Katarina win and told the reporters about the park.
90	90	"The Travel To the Ministry"	11 February 2015
Mile, Sveto and Ane go to ministry for the closing of the park and they made a scene there. Ljubo came to take them in the station.
91	91	"The Fall of The Park"	12 February 2015
The park fell down and Mile, Sveto and Ane celebrated at Marko's house. Damir and Katarina are in shocked when they found out that Marko joined them
92	92	"The Demotion"	16 February 2015
Ljubo returned in Oštrovac and revealed to Stipe that he is demoted because of what Mile, Sveto and Ane did in the ministry. Stipe go in board and punched Mile in the face.
93	93	"The Investors"	17 February 2015
Marko, Mile, Ane, Sveto and Barbara become the investors in the sawmill and put they homes in to the mortgage.
94	94	"The Sawmill"	18 February 2015
Mile opened the sawmill and the sawmill started to work, but it is not take long with that.
95	95	"The Fraud"	19 February 2015
Stipe found out that Ruža is going to rob the money and go to Rio, so he tells Ljubo, but he doesn't believe him.
96	96	"The Run"	23 February 2015
Sveto and Ruža go to the bank, but Ruža is manage to run away with the money. Sveto returned in the village and revealed the news.
97	97	"Suicide Situation"	24 February 2015
Marko try to kill himself because of what Ruža did. Milica made a plan how to get Katarina and Tomislav in the board.
98	98	"The Forest"	25 February 2015
Stipe and reverend Mirko launched a shift of the board, because the board gave the forest under the concession to Milica. Milica tried to bribe reverend Mirko, but he refused.
99	99	"Radio "Kuna" -Part I-"	26 February 2015
Josip starts the radio show about the elections and previous board in reverend Mirko's church office.
100	100	"Radio "Kuna" -Part II-"	2 March 2015
Milica try to stop Josip's show, but she failed. Josip continues to work on his show.
101	101	"Another Election Silence"	3 March 2015
Katarina and Damir have a confrontation on the radio, and Josip and Barbara are hosts. Later, Damir and Katarina had sex, but they turned air on accidentally and entire village heard them including Denis in local board.
102	102	"The Globe in Krasinac"	4 March 2015
Damir and Tomislav got drunk because of the radio situation and they went to the forest. Damir passed out and Tomislav moved the globe, which ended up on Krasinac side.
103	103	"The Real Guilt"	5 March 2015
Milica frames up Damir for moving the globe, but Katarina finds out that Tomislav is the real culprit. Damir and Josip try to get back the globe, but reverend Ante stops them.
104	104	"Brandy and The Other Things"	9 March 2015
Josip introduces Damir, Snježana, and Diana into the business with the brandy and they get the potatoes for him. At the same time, the potatoes are stolen from Ane's café, Sveto's shop, and Mile's garage. Tomislav becomes the new president of the board.
105	105	"The Potato -Part I-"	10 March 2015
Josip, Damir, Snježana, and Diana steal a truck with potatoes from Vjeko and Mrki and take it to Damir's log cabin. Vjeko and Mrki report it to Ljubo.
106	106	"The Potato -Part II-"	11 March 2015
Ljubo starts an investigation about who stole the potatoes, but when he, Vjeko, and Mrki return to the place where the truck was stolen, they see that the truck is there. Ljubo stops the investigation because he doesn't believe Vjeko and Mrki's story. Later, Josip's fellow Srećko arrives in Oštrovac.
107	107	"Ring, Wedding & Meet"	12 March 2015
Diana finds Srećko's ring and thinks it is for her to marry Josip. Srećko and Barbara meet on the street and end up in her bed. Josip makes a plan for his and Diana's wedding.
108	108	"Sex, Birth & Theft"	15 March 2015
Diana catches Barbara and Srećko in bed and is in shock. Meanwhile, Srećko plans how to rob brandy from Josip and the group with the help of Vjeko and Mrki.
109	109	"The Truth"	16 March 2015
Josip finds out who Diana's real father is and comforts Barbara about it. Barbara asks him not to tell Diana, but Josip reveals to Diana that Srećko is her real father. Meanwhile, Ljubo finds out everything about Josip's group and joins them.
110	110	"Paternity, Brandy & Supervisor"	17 March 2015
Srećko wants to be a good father to Diana, but Barbara blocks him. Vjeko and Mrki want to steal brandy from Josip and the group, and Sveto has been promoted to the new supervisor, replacing Mile in that position.
111	111	"In The Chase for The Still"	18 March 2015
Milica finds out about Josip's "resistance" group and orders Mile, Sveto, Ane, and Barbara to stop their children in their intents or she won't pay them the first installment of the loan. Meanwhile, Barbara thinks about how she'll kill herself.
112	112	"Real Drama"	19 March 2015
Barbara wants to kill herself, but Srećko saves her. Mile and Stipe find out that Milica wants to rob the village, so they make a pact with Ane to stop her. Damir, Kate, and Marko get back their brandy.
113	113	"Middleman in Jail"	22 March 2015
Milica forces Ljubo to arrest Srećko. When the group finds out what happened, Josip makes a plan to free Srećko from prison.
114	114	"Operation "Middleman""	23 March 2015
Josip, Damir, Mile, Barbara, and Diana begin to work on Srećko's escape. Mile calls Ljubo because "robbers broke into his house," and Ljubo leaves Srećko with Damir. Srećko escapes. Meanwhile, Marko locks Milica in a room with brandy, and there is an explosion.
115	115	"The Nastiness"	24 March 2015
Milica survives the explosion and tries to kill Marko. Meanwhile, Damir and Josip try to explain themselves to Ljubo, who becomes the subject of inspector Rakić's investigation due to Srećko's escape.
116	116	"Mr. & Mrs. Tepavac"	25 March 2015
Rakić arrests Josip and Diana for brandy theft. To stay together even in jail, Josip proposes to Diana, and they marry. Meanwhile, Damir, Kate, Mile, Barbara, and Stipe hunt Srećko around the village, pursued by Ljubo and Rakić for brandy-related crimes.
117	117	"It Went Srećko"	26 March 2015
Rakić arrests Srećko and leaves with him to Gospić, but Srećko escapes, leaving Rakić stranded in the woods. Ljubo later finds Rakić and persuades him to take his old job back. Srećko eventually surrenders to the police to save Josip and Diana.
118	118	"Death in the Family"	29 March 2015
Damir's grandmother Ivka dies of fright after being scared by a bear when she went to Katarina to get her pancakes. Damir is heartbroken when he hears the news from Katarina.
119	119	"Bear & Will"	30 March 2015
The attorney arrives at the Gavran's house with a new will written by Mile to be read. Meanwhile, Milica and Marko go into the forest to shoot the bear, but Marko gets scared and slips away back to Djura's house.
120	120	"Pregnant & Bear - Part I"	31 March 2015
Zdenka discovers that the will is a forgery and reveals it to Biserka and the attorney. The attorney tears the will apart. Meanwhile, everyone thinks Milica was killed by the bear, but it turns out the opposite. Snježana finds out she's pregnant with Tomislav's baby.
121	121	"Pregnant & Bear - Part II"	1 April 2015
Snježana struggles with her problem, and Diana helps her. Little boy Zoki overhears that Snježana is pregnant, so Diana and Snježana tell him about immaculate conception. Katarina and Damir make a plan to force Milica to admit her wrongdoings.
122	122	"Pregnant & Bear - Part III"	2 April 2015
Snježana and Diana bribe Zoki with candies to prevent him from telling anyone about Snježana's pregnancy. Meanwhile, Milica and Marko frame Mile for shooting the bear.
123	123	"The Bet"	5 April 2015
Reverend Ante bets with Oštrovac: if little boy Zoki wins the religious education competition, he will return the globe to Oštrovac, but if little girl Marija wins, reverend Mirko must leave Oštrovac.
124	124	"Another Truth"	6 April 2015
The truth about Reverend Ante's fraud comes to light. Little boy Zoki wins the competition, and Reverend Ante returns the globe to Oštrovac. However, he orders Vjeko to watch over the globe and return it to Krasinac at night. Meanwhile, Tomislav discovers Snježana's pregnancy and rushes to stop her from leaving Oštrovac.
125	125	"The Last Hope"	7 April 2015
Mile and Stipe blow up the globe, the last hope for the village. Just when Mile thinks things can't get worse, inspector Rakić arrives in the village to arrest him for killing a bear.
126	126	"Price To Be Paid"	8 April 2015
To pay off his debts, Sveto raises prices in his shop, and people can no longer afford the goods. Reverend Mirko buys them what they need from Krasinac. Meanwhile, inspector Rakić successfully arrests Mile at Ane's café.
127	127	"The Redemption"	9 April 2015
Sveto accidentally sells Barbara rotten eggs, causing her to get food poisoning. Sveto tries to redeem himself by offering Barbara goods from his shop for free. Meanwhile, Zdenka tries to persuade Marko to admit Milica's actions.
128	128	"Kreša's Return"	12 April 2015
Kreša is released from prison and returns to Zagreb. However, what he sees changes his mind, and he heads to Oštrovac. Meanwhile, Stipe makes a plan to remove Katarina and Tomislav from the village.
129	129	"When Grandchildren Aren't In The Village"	13 April 2015
Damir takes Katarina out of the village, while Snježana does the same with Tomislav. However, Damir confesses to Katarina, and she breaks up with him, heading to Oštrovac alone. Tomislav frees himself from handcuffs and returns to Oštrovac.
130	130	"The Distraught Milica"	14 April 2015
Milica becomes furious when Marko tells the truth and gets Mile out of jail.
131	131	"Hit-and-Run, Child & Painting"	15 April 2015
Milica hits Marko with her car, little boy Zoki wins a contest and notices that "The Lady" is crying. Reverend Mirko and bishop Andrija are shocked about that.
132	132	"Picture & Opportunity - Part I"	16 April 2015
Denis devises a plan with his lover to claim a portion of Đuro’s inheritance by sending his lover to Oštrovac to pose as Marko’s illegitimate daughter. Meanwhile, Sveto, Mile, and Stipe plan to replace the original "The Lady" painting in Reverend Mirko’s office and sell the replica.
133	133	"Picture & Opportunity - Part II"	19 April 2015
Denis' lover Doris comes to the village and starts the fraud, claiming to be Marko's daughter. Meanwhile, Josip and Damir discover Sveto, Mile, and Stipe's plan to sell the fake painting and stop them from going through with it.
134	134	"Picture & Opportunity - Part III"	20 April 2015
Milica forces Doris to take a DNA test to prove she’s Marko's daughter. Doris fakes the test results with Denis’s help. Meanwhile, Mile, Stipe, and Sveto admit their actions to Reverend Mirko, who tries to replace the fake painting with the original, but Reverend Ante catches him and blackmails him to give him "The Lady" and keep the secret.
135	135	"The Fourth Grandchild"	21 April 2015
The DNA test confirms that Doris is Marko’s biological daughter. Milica, Doris, and Marko return to the village with a lawyer, who informs the village board that Doris is now a contender for the inheritance.
136	136	"The Sisters"	22 April 2015
Marko learns about the relationship between Doris and Damir and orders Doris and Katarina not to speak to Damir anymore. Meanwhile, Sveto and Diana consider performing at Larissa’s wedding, and Tomislav wants a CD with Snježana's ultrasound results, but she refuses to give it to him.
137	137	"The Stranger"	23 April 2015
Mile and Stipe accidentally hit an unknown man while he was jogging. They take him to Mile’s home and call Katarina for help. Damir attempts to apologize to Katarina.
138	138	"The Fiance"	26 April 2015
Sveto discovers that Larissa’s fiancé Leo is the man Mile and Stipe hit with their car. Sveto takes Leo to Krasinac for Larissa’s wedding, but when Leo regains his memories, it leads to a major fight between Oštrovac and Krasinac.
139	139	"The Proposal"	27 April 2015
Tomislav proposes to Snježana, but Ane and Milica try to stop the wedding. Snježana asks Reverend Mirko for help, and he talks to Ane and Milica at Ane’s café. Meanwhile, Katarina celebrates her birthday.
140	140	"Birthday, Band & Lovers"	28 April 2015
Katarina celebrates her birthday. Sveto forms the "Tepevac band" with Diana, and Doris and Denis have a crisis in their secret relationship.
141	141	"Lovers Revealed"	29 April 2015
Damir reveals to Katarina what he overheard from Mile and Stipe about Denis and Doris.
142	142	"Wild Village"	30 April 2015
Katarina is furious with Doris and leaves Djura’s house, moving into Damir’s lodge. Mile is upset because Zdenka works as Reverend Ante’s maid. When Marko sees Denis and Doris talking on the road, he nearly shoots Denis with a double-barrel gun.
143	143	"Each Defending Its Interests"	3 May 2015
Mile pretends to be ill to stop Zdenka from working for Reverend Ante. Meanwhile, Tomislav’s friends from Zagreb make fun of Snježana, causing her to send them away along with Tomislav.
144	144	"The Problem That Must Be Solved"	4 May 2015
Damir and Josip investigate Doris and Denis, discovering the truth about Doris’s identity. They return to Oštrovac, but Denis follows them and tries to warn Doris. Damir and Josip catch them and force them to reveal the truth at Djura’s house.
145	145	"The Dog - Part I"	5 May 2015
Reverend Ante’s dog, Carica, gets lost in Oštrovac and bumps into Katarina’s dog. Stipe and Mile find Carica and return her to Reverend Ante, but Stipe mentions that Carica might be pregnant. Later, Reverend Ante shoots Katarina’s dog.
146	146	"The Dog -Part II-"	6 May 2015
Damir found wounded Hund and took him to Katarina. The vet said the best solution was to anesthetize the dog, but Katarina refused. Hund recovered the next morning. Katarina went to Reverend Ante's house, shot one of his garden gnomes, and threatened him with death.
147	147	"Attack Without Warning"	7 May 2015
Reverend Ante sent Vjeko and Mrki to kidnap Katarina as revenge for the garden gnome incident, but Katarina escaped to Damir's house. Meanwhile, little Zoki went to Vatican to meet the pope, and Damir and Josip worked on a movie about Reverend Ante's evil deeds.
148	148	"Movie, Proposal & Vatican"	10 May 2015
Reverend Ante took the movie shot by Josip and Damir. Barbara and little Zoki went to the Vatican to meet the pope. Tomislav finally proposed to Snježana properly.
149	149	"Marriage & Marriage"	11 May 2015
Tomislav and Snježana are preparing for their wedding and are happy, but their joy could be overshadowed by the news that the bank bailiffs are coming to the village to seize property.
150	150	"Mr. & Mrs. Mamić"	12 May 2015
Tomislav and Snježana got married, but their wedding night is interrupted by drunk Milica and Ane. Meanwhile, the bank bailiffs arrive in the village, and Mile, Zdenka, Josip, and Sveto hide their property while Stipe distracts the bailiffs.
151	151	"The Confiscation"	13 May 2015
The bank bailiffs arrive in the village and confiscate Barbara's property and part of Mile's. Sveto hides his property in Reverend Mirko's office. Meanwhile, Ane and Milica celebrate after Snježana and Tomislav's wedding, and Milica repays Ane's loan.
152	152	"The Donation"	14 May 2015
When Barbara returns from the Vatican, she finds her house empty. Sveto launches a charity campaign for her, but when Barbara finds out, she intentionally moves into Sveto's house.
153	153	"The Ring"	15 May 2015
Little Zoki steals the Pope's ring, and Barbara confiscates it to return it to the pope but changes her mind. Meanwhile, Damir and Josip get jobs at a club, and Stipe buys a TV for Mile to get him out of his house.
154	154	"On The Barricades"	17 May 2015
Vjeko and Mrki beat Damir as revenge for him and Josip beating them in front of the club. Meanwhile, Bishop Andrija, with the help of Reverend Mirko and little Zoki, set a trap for Reverend Ante.
155	155	"Mara's Pension -Part I-"	18 May 2015
When old Mrs. Mara, little Zoki's grandmother, falls and breaks her leg, Mile takes her into his house to care for her. When Sveto finds out why Mile took her, he spoils Mile's TV.
156	156	"Mara's Pension -Part II-"	19 May 2015
Mara moves into Sveto's house, but Mile finds out about Sveto's plan and goes to Sveto's house to reveal to Mara why Sveto broke his TV and what Sveto's real intentions are.
157	157	"The Supermarket -Part I-"	20 May 2015
Katarina's old school friend, Ivica Brkic, arrives in Oštrovac to open a supermarket but has no place to do it.
158	158	"The Supermarket -Part II-"	21 May 2015
Mile and Stipe suggest to Ivica that he open the supermarket in the school, but Barbara and Sveto oppose it. Sveto later finds out that Barbara is only against opening it in her school but not in his garage.
159	159	"The Kiss and the Blackmail"	24 May 2015
Ivica tries to kiss Katarina, but Sveto and Barbara take a photo of the situation. Katarina does not allow Ivica to kiss her, but Sveto and Barbara don't make the photo.
160	160	"The Jealousy"	25 May 2015
When Damir finds out about the incident between Katarina and Ivica, he gets furious. Katarina tries to explain that nothing happened, but Damir doesn't believe her.
161	161	"The Referendum"	26 May 2015
Villagers are called to vote for or against the new supermarket. Barbara discovers that Ivica Brkić has been faking votes and stealing the voting box. Barbara is hit by a car driven by Ivica's father, Nadan Brkić, but survives.
162	162	"Ring & Deceased"	27 May 2015
Damir, with Josip's help, buys a ring for Katarina from Vjeko and Mrki, but Zdenka thinks the ring is not beautiful and gives Damir another one. Meanwhile, Sveto informs Mile, Barbara, Ane, and Stipe that the police have caught Ruža, who was killed in an accident. Her coffin arrives in Oštrovac.
163	163	"One Meeting & One Funeral"	28 May 2015
Ruža is buried, and everyone attends her funeral. Meanwhile, Damir and Katarina plan their date.
164	164	"Decision"	31 May 2015
Damir decides to go work on a ship platform to pay off his credits. Meanwhile, Sveto, Barbara, Mile, and Zdenka are evicted by inspector Rakić and the bank officers. Mile and Zdenka stay at Stipe's house, and Sveto and Barbara move into Reverend Mirko's house.
165	165	"Battle for Inheritance -Part I-"	1 June 2015
Katarina suggests to Tomislav that they leave the village for 24 hours so Oštrovac can get the inheritance money. Meanwhile, Mile and Stipe plan to kidnap Tomislav, and Sveto locks Milica and Marko in Reverend Mirko's office.
166	166	"Battle for Inheritance - Part II"	2 June 2015
Zdenka unlocked Milica and Marko. Meanwhile, Katarina and Tomislav left Oštrovac. When Milica and Marko found out, they went searching for them and managed to track them down by tailing Damir. But will they get to Oštrovac in time?
167	167	"Battle for Inheritance - Part III"	3 June 2015
Milica and Marko found Tomislav and Katarina by tailing Damir. After a brief conflict, they went back to Oštrovac but were too late by one minute. The money went to Oštrovac, and later, Damir proposed to Katarina.
168	168	"Lawyer in The Run"	4 June 2015
The lawyer who stole the money is chased by Damir, Mile, Stipe, and Sveto from Oštrovac and by Vjeko and Mrki from Krasinac. But will they catch him and recover the stolen money?
169	169	"Who Stole The Money?"	5 June 2015
Rakić informs Damir, Mile, Stipe, and the others that the lawyer who stole the money had been arrested, but the money was not with him. Soon, they realize only one person could have taken the money from the lawyer.
170	170	"Covered Debts"	6 June 2015
The person who took the money from the lawyer returns it to the villagers. Mile and others who had the mortgage paid off their debts and can now go back to their old homes.
171	171	"Mr. & Mrs. Gavran"	7 June 2015
After everything returns to normal, Damir and Katarina begin preparing for their wedding. Ljubo returns to Oštrovac one last time for his best friend's wedding. Final appearance of Ljubo Žulj and don Mirko Komadina.
