= Kud puklo da puklo season 2 =

Kud puklo da puklo
- Season 2
- No. of episodes: 179

Release
- Original network: Nova TV
- Original release: 7 September 2015 – 9 June 2016

Season chronology
- ← Previous; Season 1

The second season of Kud puklo da puklo premiered on 7 September 2015 and ended on 9 June 2016 on Nova TV. The season lasted for 179 episodes.

== Overview ==
This season contains 179 episodes and Jelena Perčin, Vladimir Posavec Tušek, Katja Rožmarić, Monika Mihajlović and Petar Burić joined the cast. At the end of episode 107 Jelena Perčin, Vladimir Posavec Tušek, Jagoda Kumrić and Katja Rožmarić departed the cast. At the beginning of episode 108, Tomislav Krstanović joined the cast.

== Cast ==
=== Main ===
- Mirna Medaković Stepinac as Katarina Gavran
- Momčilo Otašević as Damir Gavran
- Milan Štrljić as Mile Gavran
- Miodrag Krivokapić as Stipe Žilj
- Tijana Pečenčić as Diana Tepavac
- Asim Ugljen as Josip Tepavac
- Ecija Ojdanić as Barbara Murgić
- Žarko Radić as Sveto Tepavac
- Barbara Vicković as Ane Jelaska
- Suzana Nikolić as Zdenka Gavran
- Jelena Perčin as Miranda Žeravica (Episodes 1-107)
- Vladimir Posavec Tušek as Dario Žeravica (Episodes 1-107)
- Jagoda Kumrić as Snježana Mamić (Episodes 6-107)
- Janko Popović Volarić as Krešimir Kolarić (Episodes 6-179)
- Miran Kurspahić as Tomislav Mamić (Episodes 6-179)
- Katja Rožmarić as Sara Žeravica (Episodes 1-107)
- Monika Mihajlović as Tina Božić
- Željko Pervan as Marko Došen
- Sanja Vejnović as Milica Mamić
- Petar Burić as Mate Božić
- Vesna Tominac Matačić as Višnja Došen
- Tomislav Krstanović as don Frajno Olić (Episodes 108-179)

=== Recurring ===
- Janko Popović Volarić as Krešimir Kolarić (Episode 5)
- Tomislav Krstanović as don Frajno Olić (Episodes 92-105, 107)

== Episodes ==
No. overall	No. in season	Title	Original release date
172	1	"The Hotel"	7 September 2015
Mile and Stipe, with Slave's help, are preparing opening of a new hotel in Oštrovac, "Đura's dream". Also, Sveto, who is new president of a local board, is trying to close the same. First appearance of Miranda Žeravica, Dario Žeravica, Sara Žeravica, Tina Žeravica and Mate Božić.
173	2	"The Deadman"	8 September 2014
The Opening of a hotel goes wrong when Mile, Stipe and Marko find their first hotel guest dead on the stairs and Sveto is locked in one of the rooms by Stipe. Mile suggests Stipe to move the body out of the hotel.
173	2	"The Deadman"	8 September 2015
The opening of the hotel goes wrong when Mile, Stipe, and Marko find their first hotel guest dead on the stairs. Meanwhile, Sveto is locked in one of the rooms by Stipe, and Mile suggests moving the body out of the hotel.
174	3	"In The Search for The Diamonds"	9 September 2015
Dario and Miranda start their search for late Stanislav's diamonds. In the meantime, Višnja goes to Zagreb to make papers for her divorce from Marko, and Dario and Miranda look for a hotel in the village.
175	4	"Funeral, Divorce and The Diamonds"	10 September 2015
Višnja becomes more determined about her decision to divorce Marko. Dario and Miranda bury Stanislav under a false name and continue their search for diamonds.
176	5	"Road Travel Marko Došen"	11 September 2015
Katarina forces Marko to go to Zagreb and apologize to Višnja. Miranda, thinking Marko has the diamonds in his bag, goes undercover and drives him to Zagreb.
177	6	"Return to Oštrovac"	14 September 2015
Marko returns to Oštrovac with Miranda. Later, Miranda tells Dario that the diamonds weren't in Marko's possession. Meanwhile, Tomislav and Snježana return to Oštrovac on an unexpected visit.
178	7	"The Internet"	15 September 2015
Marko decides to sell fish. Mile wants to import a transmitter for the internet so the hotel can have internet access, but Sveto is against it. Mile convenes a meeting of the local board, where, unfortunately for Sveto, the vote favors constructing the transmitter on local land.
179	8	"The Transmitter or The Agronomy"	16 September 2015
At the public hearing, both options have presentation issues, but Miranda eventually obtains the villagers' promise to employ them. However, in a repeat vote, the councilors stick to their original decision and vote for the transmitter, ignoring Sveto and the villagers' reactions.
180	9	"The Protest"	17 September 2015
When the hotel reach new guests, Mile can not risk a bad reputation with the protests so rages at the Council because of the evil acts of sabotage.
181	10	"In the Eve of Bullfighting - Part I"	18 September 2015
Mile and Sveto reach an agreement: Bullfighting on the day of St. Hubert will determine whether Mile gets the transmitter or Sveto sells the sacred land.
182	11	"In the Eye of Bullfighting - Part II"	21 September 2015
Preparations for the bullfighting. While Stipe tries to train Damir and Josip intensively with a healthy diet, Mile arranges official uniforms for the bullfighting.
183	12	"In the Eye of Bullfighting - Part III"	22 September 2015
Convinced that the glory and reverend Ante can't lose, Sveto prepares a celebration and orders cheap fireworks.
184	13	"The Second Bullfighting and the Concert"	23 September 2015
While drunken Slave falls and Mile's team gets an advantage, Miranda "saves" the day by showing Mile's team her breasts. Meanwhile, Sveto sings for the amused people of Oštrovac, but an angry Mile wants revenge and, with Stipe, fires Sveto's fireworks.
185	14	"Help for Sveto"	24 September 2015
Sveto is in shock due to the burned house. When Barbara organizes humanitarian action to help him, Sveto insults her, realizing it as charity.
186	15	"The Investigation"	25 September 2015
Policeman Mate arrives in Oštrovac, determined to solve the case of the arson.
187	16	"Dario's Daughters"	28 September 2015
188	17	"Infertility, Paintball, and the Hamster"	29 September 2015
189	18	"The Advertisement for the Hotel"	30 September 2015
190	19	"The Kiss and the Forced Labor"	1 October 2015
191	20	"The Agronomists and the Other Things"	2 October 2015
192	21	"In the Eye of the Christening - Part I"	5 October 2015
193	22	"In the Eye of the Christening - Part II"	6 October 2015
194	23	"The Christening"	7 October 2015
195	24	"Mile's Plan"	8 October 2015
196	25	"The Problem with Barbara"	9 October 2015
197	26	"The Opponent - Part I"	12 October 2015
198	27	"The Opponent - Part II"	13 October 2015
199	28	"Jeopardy, Hamster, and the Supply"	14 October 2015
200	29	"Oštrovac Elects"	15 October 2015
201	30	"President Žeravica"	16 October 2015
202	31	"The Sabotage"	19 October 2015
203	32	"The Bingo"	20 October 2015
204	33	"The Extraction"	21 October 2015
205	34	"The Role"	22 October 2015
206	35	"The Producer, Mate's Upbringing, and Slave's Turnout"	23 October 2015
207	36	"The Gay"	26 October 2015
208	37	"Danger Over the Village"	27 October 2015
209	38	"The Assyles - Part I"	28 October 2015
210	39	"The Assyles - Part II"	29 October 2015
211	40	"The Assyles - Part III"	30 October 2015
212	41	"The Prencipt Oštrovac"	2 November 2015
213	42	"The Robbers - Part I"	3 November 2015
214	43	"The Robbers - Part II"	4 November 2015
215	44	"Jela's Funeral"	5 November 2015
216	45	"The Undertaker, the Painters and Moving In"	6 November 2015
217	46	"Lidija Božić Cometh"	9 November 2015
218	47	"Pregnant Woman, Examination and Curling"	10 November 2015
219	48	"The Good News and the Bad News"	11 November 2015
220	49	"Only Bad News"	12 November 2015
221	50	"Neither Daughter-in-Law, Neither Grandchild"	13 November 2015
222	51	"Road Travel Zdenka Gavran"	16 November 2015
223	52	"Srećkohunt"	17 November 2015
224	53	"Mrs. Tepavac and Mrs. Gavran Regrets"	18 November 2015
225	54	"Marriage Whirlpool"	19 November 2015
226	55	"Jack's Return"	20 November 2015
227	56	"Help for Dario"	23 November 2015
228	57	"A Lot of Problems"	24 November 2015
229	58	"Family Meetings"	25 November 2015
230	59	"Family Problems"	26 November 2015
231	60	"The Road of the Hunting"	27 November 2015
232	61	"Cheating and the Other Things"	30 November 2015
233	62	"New President"	1 December 2015
234	63	"Mad Dario"	2 December 2015
235	64	"Gavran vs. Gavran"	3 December 2015
236	65	"President Is..."	4 December 2015
237	66	"First Meeting of the New Board"	7 December 2015
238	67	"The Concession"	8 December 2015
239	68	"In the Evening of the Bowling"	9 December 2015
240	69	"The Bowling"	10 December 2015
241	70	"Purchasing the Hotel - Part I"	11 December 2015
242	71	"Purchasing the Hotel - Part II"	14 December 2015
243	72	"Purchasing the Hotel - Part III"	15 December 2015
244	73	"Death of Mr. Prpa"	16 December 2015
245	74	"Who Is the Killer?"	17 December 2015
246	75	"Poor Jack"	18 December 2015
247	76	"Folklore and the Other Problems"	20 December 2015
248	77	"In the Evening of the Competition"	21 December 2015
249	78	"The Winners"	22 December 2015
250	79	"35 Years of Marriage"	23 December 2015
251	80	"The President in Oštrovac"	24 December 2015
252	81	"OCCOC"	25 December 2015
253	82	"The Guilt"	27 December 2015
254	83	"Operation "President""	28 December 2015
255	84	"The Curse Village"	30 January 2016
256	85	"Trolley, Baby, Trap, Plan"	31 January 2016
257	86	"Forest Ranger"	1 February 2016
258	87	"Downfall - Part I"	2 February 2016
259	88	"Downfall - Part II"	3 February 2016
260	89	"Stipe's Plan"	4 February 2016
261	90	"The Fair"	7 February 2016
262	91	"The Earthquake"	8 February 2016
263	92	"The Beautician and the CDs"	9 February 2016
264	93	"Jealousy, Interview and Miranda"	10 February 2016
265	94	"The Striptease"	11 February 2016
266	95	"The Priest and Expectant Mother - Part I"	14 February 2016
267	96	"The Priest and Expectant Mother - Part II"	15 February 2016
268	97	"The Priest and Expectant Mother - Part III"	16 February 2016
269	98	"The Expectant Mother and the Cook"	17 February 2016
270	99	"The Marital Counseling and the Internet"	18 February 2016
271	100	"In the Evening of the Nuptial"	21 February 2016
272	101	"The Nuptial - Part I"	22 February 2016
273	102	"The Nuptial - Part II"	23 February 2016
274	103	"A Cop Undercover"	24 February 2016
275	104	"The Secret Is Revealed"	25 February 2016
276	105	"The Arrest"	28 February 2016
277	106	"The Arrested"	29 February 2016
278	107	"The Case Is Closed"	1 March 2016
279	108	"The Sportsman"	2 March 2016
280	109	"The Gym and Jodi"	3 March 2016
281	110	"The Job"	6 March 2016
282	111	"In the Evening of the Match"	7 March 2016
283	112	"The Match"	8 March 2016
284	113	"Someone in the Dark, Someone in the Light"	9 March 2016
285	114	"About Franja"	10 March 2016
286	115	"The Priest Perversions"	13 March 2016
287	116	"In the Evening of the Celebration - Part I"	14 March 2016
288	117	"In the Evening of the Celebration - Part II"	15 March 2016
289	118	"In the Evening of the Celebration - Part III"	16 March 2016
290	119	"Chase, Adoption and Will"	17 March 2016
291	120	"Question of Honor"	18 March 2016
292	121	"Right Choice"	21 March 2016
293	122	"The Robbery"	22 March 2016
294	123	"Mr. and Mrs. Božić"	23 March 2016
295	124	"Different Roles"	24 March 2016
296	125	"All the Best"	25 March 2016
297	126	"Guests in Hotel"	28 March 2016
298	127	"The Swingers - Part I"	29 March 2016
299	128	"The Swingers - Part II"	30 March 2016
300	129	"Operation "Hotel""	31 March 2016
301	130	"Sodoma and Gomorrah"	1 April 2016
302	131	"Kidnapping, Parents and Camp"	4 April 2016
303	132	"Love and Polygon"	5 April 2016
304	133	"Status Quo"	6 April 2016
305	134	"A Few Good Men"	7 April 2016
306	135	"Film & Death"	8 April 2016
307	136	"Milica & Candidature"	11 April 2016
308	137	"Milica's Condition"	12 April 2016
309	138	"The Candidate"	13 April 2016
310	139	"Engagement & Birthday"	14 April 2016
311	140	"Operation "Candidate""	15 April 2016
312	141	"Oštrovac Chaos - Part I"	18 April 2016
313	142	"Oštrovac Chaos - Part II"	19 April 2016
314	143	"Taken"	20 April 2016
315	144	"Mysteries of Oštrovac"	21 April 2016
316	145	"Political Games"	22 April 2016
317	146	"The Boycott"	25 April 2016
318	147	"Right in Front of the Registrar"	26 April 2016
319	148	"Case of Missing Statue"	27 April 2016
320	149	"Home for Retirement and Orphans"	28 April 2016
321	150	"To Everyone Something Is Going"	29 April 2016
322	151	"Scandal in Retirement Home"	2 May 2016
323	152	"Crazy Excesses"	3 May 2016
324	153	"In Chase for Srećko"	4 May 2016
325	154	"On Sufferance"	5 May 2016
326	155	"Newcomers"	6 May 2016
327	156	"Kids - Part I"	9 May 2016
328	157	"Kids - Part II"	10 May 2016
329	158	"Happy Family"	11 May 2016
330	159	"The Cheese and the Grandson"	12 May 2016
331	160	"Grandfathers and Grandkids"	13 May 2016
332	161	"Godfathering - Part I"	16 May 2016
333	162	"Godfathering - Part II"	17 May 2016
334	163	"Unpopular Measures"	18 May 2016
335	164	"The Village Prior to Disappearance"	19 May 2016
336	165	"Collective - Part I"	20 May 2016
337	166	"Collective - Part II"	23 May 2016
338	167	"Serious Problems"	24 May 2016
339	168	"Krasinac Collective"	25 May 2016
340	169	"Rivals"	26 May 2016
341	170	"Roko"	27 May 2016
342	171	"Sadness and Despair"	30 May 2016
343	172	"Nadan is Back"	31 May 2016
344	173	"Suspicious Offer"	1 June 2016
345	174	"Evil Intents"	2 June 2016
346	175	"The Departures"	3 June 2016
347	176	"Sinking Ship - Part I"	6 June 2016
348	177	"Sinking Ship - Part II"	7 June 2016
349	178	"Reborn Village - Part I"	8 June 2016
350	179	"Reborn Village - Part II"	9 June 2016
