= List of Croatian telenovelas =

The first Croatian telenovela was Villa Maria, which was broadcast from 2004 to 2005 by the Croatian national broadcaster HRT. Aside from HRT, the commercial networks RTL and Nova TV have been airing various telenovelas since late 2000s.

== List ==
Year(s)	Title	Production company	No. of Episodes	Network	Ref.
2004–05	Villa Maria	AVA	160	HRT	
2005–06	Ljubav u zaleđu	AVA	175	HRT	
2006–07	Obični ljudi	AVA	170	HRT	
2007–08	Ponos Ratkajevih	AVA	180	HRT	
2007–08	Ne daj se, Nina	RTL	52	RTL	
2008	Zakon ljubavi	AVA	60	Nova TV	
2008–09	Sve će biti dobro	Ring Multimedia	180	Nova TV	
2009–10	Dolina sunca	Ring Multimedia	210	HRT	
2009–11	Najbolje godine	Ring Multimedia	318	Nova TV	
2011	Pod sretnom zvijezdom	Ring Multimedia	75	Nova TV	
2011–13	Larin izbor	Nova TV	347	Nova TV	
2011–13	Ruža vjetrova	RTL	340	RTL	
2013–14	Zora dubrovačka	Nova TV	161	Nova TV	
2013–14	Tajne	RTL	140	RTL	
2014–15	Vatre ivanjske	RTL	140	RTL	
2014–16	Kud puklo da puklo	Nova TV	350	Nova TV	
2016–17	Zlatni dvori	Nova TV	160	Nova TV	
2016–17	Prava žena	RTL	100	RTL	
2017–18	Čista ljubav	Nova TV	167	Nova TV	
2019–20	Drugo ime ljubavi	Nova TV	175	Nova TV	
2020–21	Dar mar	Nova TV	202	Nova TV	
