= Kumovi =

Croatian telenovela

- Starring: Momčilo Otašević; Ana Uršula Najev; Vedran Mlikota; Vladimir Tintor; Daria Lorenci Flatz
- Opening theme: "Ti budi ti"
- Country of origin: Croatia
- Original language: Croatian
- No. of seasons: 6
- No. of episodes: 650+

Production
- Running time: 45 minutes

Original release
- Network: Nova TV
- Release: February 7, 2022 – present

Related
- Najbolje godine; Kud puklo da puklo

Kumovi (English: Godfathers) is a Croatian soap opera created by Dea Matas. The series premiered on February 7, 2022 on Nova TV. Momčilo Otašević and Ana Uršula Najev are main protagonists.

== Synopsis ==
The central story revolves around the handsome Janko Gotovac (Momčilo Otašević) and beautiful Luce Akrap (Ana Uršula Najev). He is the best man, and she is the maid of honor at the wedding of their mutual friends. After a passionate night in Zagreb, they part ways, thinking they are not meant to be together. What they don’t know is that life will soon bring them together again, through warring family ties in a small village from which they cannot escape.

Janko’s father, Aljoša Gotovac (Vladimir Tintor), after a financial collapse and accusations from custody, is unexpectedly saved by his godfather Stipan Macan (Milan Štrljić) and brought back to his former hometown of Zaglave with his wife Vesna (Olga Pakalović), son Janko, and daughter Lara (Nika Barišić). The life of Gotovac family is turned upside down. They’ve come from Zagreb to a small village where a deep division exists over the construction of a road that could bring prosperity and money to an otherwise poor region. The sides in the village are split: Stipan Macan and his son Vinko (Vedran Mlikota) are on one side, and the others, led by the cunning Zvone Akrap (Stojan Matavulj), are on the other. The arrival of the Gotovac family stirs up even more trouble.

While Stipan has kept the secret his whole life that Aljoša is actually his biological son, the truth eventually comes to light. It will be up to brothers and rivals, Vinko and Aljoša, to either unite and save the village from what turns out to be Akrap’s fraud, or further wage war over Stipan’s inheritance and ultimately lose everything. Will the love between Janko and Luce be stronger than the family feud, and can they reconcile the warring sides?

Throughout the later seasons, new twists will emerge that change the course and plot of the series.

== Cast ==
=== Regular characters ===
Main cast members
Actor	Character	Duration
Momčilo Otašević	Janko Gotovac	2022–present
Ana Uršula Najev	Lucija 'Luce' Akrap Gotovac	2022–present
Vladimir Tintor	Aljoša Gotovac	2022–present
Vedran Mlikota	Vinko Macan	2022–present
Daria Lorenci Flatz	Jadranka 'Jadre' Macan	2022–present
Olga Pakalović	Vesna Gotovac	2022–present
Nika Barišić	Lara Gotovac Čukela	2022–present
Stojan Matavulj	Zvonimir 'Zvone' Akrap	2022–present
Barbara Vicković	Anđela Akrap	2022–present
Rada Mrkšić	Ivka Macan	2022–present
Mirna Mihelčić	Matija Macan	2022–present
Lovre Kondža	Martin Akrap	2022–present
Petra Kraljev	Milica Crljen Skelin	2022–present
Mijo Kevo	Marko 'Šank' Skelin	2022–present
Ecija Ojdanić	Mirjana Bogdan	2022–present
Žarko Radić	Stanislav 'Stanley' Čukela	2024–present
Matija Prskalo	Spomenka Crljen	2024–present
Zdravko Vukelić	Božo 'Braco' Zovko	2025–present
Andrija Tomić	Goran Aviani	2025–present
Hrvoje Barišić	Nediljko 'Nedo' Grabovac	2026–present
Lejla Hakalović	Iva Grabovac	2026–present

=== Recurring and guest characters ===
Recurring and guest cast members
Actor	Character	Duration
Domagoj Ivanković	Josip Kvasina	2022–present (Note: Domagoj Ivanković was member of the main cast in first two seasons, however from season 3 onwards, he reduced his involvement in the series, appearing only sporadically in the following episodes and subsequent seasons.)
Velimir Čokljat	Priest	2022–present
Dražen Mikulić	Inspector Darko Jurić	2022–present
Šime Zanze	Frane Peruša	2022–present
Irena Matas	Zdenka	2022–present
Anica Kontić	Katarina 'Kate' Bulj	2022–present
Slavko Juraga	Jadranko Zovko	2024–present
Karmen Sunčana Lovrić	Tonka	2024–present
Mara Brkić	Cvita Macan-Akrap	2024–present
Anica Kovačević	Hrvojka Runje Zovko	2024–present
Tonka Mršić	Tatjana Vuleta	2024–present
Igor Kovač	Kristijan 'Kiki' Mađarević	2026–present

=== Previous cast members ===
Previous cast members
Actor	Character	Duration
Ratko Glavina	Andrija Akrap (Dida)	2022–2023
Milan Štrljić	Stipan Macan	2022–2024
Lara Obad	Pere Macan #1	2022–2024
Stjepan Perić	Vice Vuletić	2024
Linda Begonja	Jasenka Runje	2024
Konstantin Haag	Zlatan Bogdan	2022-2025
Jagoda Kumrić Haag	Vedrana Crljen Bogdan	2022-2025
Marina Redžepović	Šima Mamić Macan	2023–2026
Fabijan Pavao Medvešek	Tomislav 'Tommy' Čukela	2024–2026
Tea Ljubešić	Pere Macan	2025–2026
