= Kud puklo da puklo (TV series) =

- Genre: Telenovela; Romance; Comedy
- Created by: Vlado Bulić
- Starring: Mirna Medaković; Momčilo Otašević; Milan Štrljić; Miodrag Krivokapić; Stjepan Perić; Asim Ugljen; Ecija Ojdanić; Žarko Radić; Janko Popović Volarić; Miran Kurspahić; Barbara Vicković; Suzana Nikolić; Jagoda Kumrić; Tijana Pečenčić; Sanja Vejnović; Željko Pervan; Ivan Herceg; Vesna Tominac; Jelena Perčin; Vladimir Posavec Tušek; Katja Rožmarić; Monika Mihajlović; Petar Burić; Tomislav Krstanović
- Opening theme: "Odo' ja" by Jelena Rozga
- Country of origin: Croatia
- Original language: Croatian
- No. of seasons: 2
- No. of episodes: 350 (list of episodes)

Production
- Production location: Zagreb, Croatia
- Production company: Nova TV

Original release
- Network: Nova TV
- Release: 15 September 2014 – 9 June 2016

Related
- Zora dubrovačka; Zlatni dvori

Kud puklo da puklo is a Croatian comedy telenovela produced by Nova TV. It is an original story starring Mirna Medaković, Momčilo Otašević, and Ivan Herceg. It is also broadcast in Bosnia-Herzegovina, Serbia, and Slovenia. The first season was aired from 15 September 2014 to 7 June 2015. The second season began airing on 7 September 2015 and ended on 9 June 2016. The cast also includes Luka Peroš best known for his role of Marseille in Money Heist. The series was adapted in Greece with the name Χαιρέτα μου τον Πλάτανο (Hereta mou to Platano) which means Greet the plan tree. This series started in october of 2020 and ended in May 2023 in the state channel ERT.

== Plot ==
Kud puklo da puklo takes place in Oštrovac, a village at the edge of the national park. The story follows Damir (Momčilo Otašević), a national park ranger, and Katarina (Mirna Medaković), a doctor, who move to Oštrovac as directed by Katarina's grandfather's will. Đuro (Mate Gulin), Katarina's grandfather, lived most of his life as a recluse but left a small fortune to his grandchildren Katarina, Tomislav (Miran Kurspahić), and Krešo (Janko Popović Volarić) provided they spend a year in his dilapidated house in Oštrovac. If they did not, the money would go to the village.

Since the village on the edge of collapse, this money could mean its salvation. Therefore, the village will, at least initially, to do everything to drive Đuro's grandchildren out and get the fortune. Damir's father Mile (Milan Štrljić) heads the local committee, but his adversary, Sveto (Žarko Radić), is doing everything to obtain his position. Many townspeople including a teacher, Barbara (Ecija Ojdanić); a priest, Mirko (Ivan Herceg); Mile's best friend, Stipe (Miodrag Krivokapić); and local tavern owner, Ane (Barbara Vicković), are also on the committee. Each of them, except the priest, agrees it would be a good idea to surreptitiously force Đuro's grandchildren of the village.

Since money is on the line, Đuro's grandchildren have to contend with the villagers regularly. Certain conditions in the home, such as no electricity or running water, also serve to make them more uncomfortable.

Damir quickly develops feelings for Katarina putting him at odds with the rest of the village. Katarina soon starts to feel something for Damir, but resists. In addition to external obstacles between them, Damir and Katarina have great personal differences too. Damir is very conservative and has ideas about where a woman's place is while Katarina has an emancipated and strong personality like her grandfather Đuro.

At the end of the first season, the grandchildren won inheritance and chose to save the village from foreclosure investing in the construction of the hotel "Đuro's Dream" on rural land where a strange man dies through a series of comic events.

Dario (Vladimir Posavec Tušek), the man's accountant, comes looking for him and the diamonds he supposedly left behind. Dario has no choice but to settle with his family at Oštrovac to search the treasure. After failed attempts discover the diamonds, Dario decides to disguise himself as a farmer. Over time, he is quite successful. He eventually brings his daughters Tina (Monika Mihajlović) and Sara (Katja Rožmarić) and searches less for the diamonds. Unsatisfied that her husband had given up the search for the treasure, Miranda (Jelena Perčin) leaves Dario. Miranda eventually returns determined to find the diamonds herself.

== Cast and characters ==
Character	Actor	Seasons	
Character	Actor	1	2
Katarina Gavran	Mirna Medaković	Main	Main
Damir Gavran	Momčilo Otašević	Main	Main
Mile Gavran	Milan Štrljić	Main	Main
Stipe Žulj	Miodrag Krivokapić	Main	Main
Ljubo Žulj	Stjepan Perić	Main	
Josip Tepavac	Asim Ugljen	Main	Main
Barbara Murgić	Ecija Ojdanić	Main	Main
Sveto Tepavac	Žarko Radić	Main	Main
Krešimir Kolarić	Janko Popović Volarić	Main	Main
Tomislav Mamić	Miran Kurspahić	Main	Main
Ane Jelaska	Barbara Vicković	Main	Main
Zdenka Gavran	Suzana Nikolić	Main	Main
Snježana Mamić	Jagoda Kumrić	Main	Main
Diana Tepavac	Tijana Pečenčić	Main	Main
Milica Mamić	Sanja Vejnović	Main	Main
Marko Došen	Željko Pervan	Main	Main
Don Mirko Komadina	Ivan Herceg	Main	
Višnja Došen	Vesna Tominac	Main	Main
Miranda Žeravica	Jelena Perčin		Main
Dario Žeravica	Vladimir Posavec-Tušek		Main
Sara Žeravica	Katja Rožmarić		Main
Tina Božić	Monika Mihajlović		Main
Mate Božić	Petar Burić		Main
Don Franjo Olić	Tomislav Krstanović		Main

=== End ===
The series ended after two seasons and its last episode was aired on 9 June 2016.

== Episodes ==
Season	Episodes	Originally released	
Season	Episodes	First released	Last released
1	171	15 September 2014	7 June 2015
2	179	7 September 2015	9 June 2016
