= Čista ljubav =

Croatian television drama

- Genre: Drama
- Created by: Nataša Buljan
- Directed by: Josip Žuvan
- Starring: Janko Popović Volarić; Tara Rosandić; Olga Pakalović; Momčilo Otašević; Nives Celzijus; Sanja Vejnović; Saša Anočić
- Music by: Tomislav Babić
- Opening theme: Čista ljubav - Boris Novković
- Country of origin: Croatia
- Original language: Croatian
- No. of episodes: 173

Production
- Producers: Josip Žuvan; Tanja Golić; David Kapac; Zoran Margetić
- Running time: 45 minutes

Original release
- Network: Nova TV
- Release: 10 September 2017 – 14 June 2018

Related
- Zlatni dvori; Na granici

Čista ljubav (transl. Pure Love) is a Croatian television drama. The show was created by Nataša Buljan and first broadcast on Nova TV on 10 September 2017.

== Cast ==
Actor	Character
Ivan Herceg, later Janko Popović Volarić	Tomo Vitez
Momčilo Otašević	Ranko Novak
Tara Rosandić	Sonja Vitez (ex-Lončar)
Martina Stjepanović	Gordana Goga Biskup
Dora Arar	Marija Maša Vitez
Nives Celzijus	Snježana Mamić †
Olga Pakalović	Branka Balog (ex-Vitez)
Ksenija Pajić	Edita Leskovar
Sanja Vejnović	Jasna Lončar
Csilla Barath Bastaić	Dina Barić
Saša Anočić	Milan Lončar †
Marko Petrić	Vlado Lončar
Sementa Rajhard	Emina Tabaković
Dado Ćosić	Blaženko Blaž Balog
Mladen Vulić	Mario - Rus †
Ljubomir Kerekeš	Zdenko Majdak - Profesor
Lana Gojak	Edita in young days
Slavko Sobin	Damir Vitez †
Sara Moser	Marija Vitez †
Krunoslav Klabučar	Štef Barić
Asja Jovanović	Blaženka Balog
Martina Čvek	Helena Vitez
Armin Omerović	Hrvoje Bulić
Sara Duvnjak	Asja Tabaković †
Dražen Mikulić	Grgić †
Jasna Palić-Picukarić	dr. Jurić
Mirjana Sinožić	Nada Tabaković
Josip Klobučar	doctor
Ivica Pucar	dr. Gordan Lalić
