= Ojdanić =

Ojdanić (Serbian Cyrillic: Ојданић) is a Serbian and Croatian surname. It may refer to:

- Era Ojdanić (born 1947), Serbian folk singer
- Dragoljub Ojdanić, FR Yugoslav general and former Defence minister
- Ecija Ojdanić (born 1974), Croatian actress
- Žan Ojdanić (1971–2016), leader of the supporters group Torcida Split
