= Karmen Sunčana Lovrić =

Croatian actress

- Born: March 24, 1986 (age 39); Zagreb, SR Croatia, SFR Yugoslavia
- Occupation: Actress
- Known for: Jelena in Ruža vjetrova

Karmen Sunčana Lovrić (born March 24, 1986, in Zagreb), is a Croatian actress.

== Filmography ==
Film
Year	Title	Role	Notes
2007-2008	Zabranjena ljubav	Monika	Guest Star
2008	Zakon Ljubavi	Sanja	Guest Star
2009	Sve će biti dobro	Barbara	Guest Star
2011	Larin izbor	Ana	Guest Star
2011	Loza	Prostitute	Guest Star
2011	Provodi i sprovodi	Zvjezdica	Guest Star
2012-2013	Ruža vjetrova	Jelena Čulo	Antagonist
2014	Zora dubrovačka	Željka	Supporting Role

=== Movie roles ===
Film
Year	Title	Role	Notes
2010	Zamka (za) snimatelja	Porno Actress	
2013	Kratki spojevi	Italian Girl	
2014	After the Dream	Pin-up Girl	
