= Miodrag Krivokapić =

Miodrag Krivokapić may refer to:

- Miodrag Krivokapić (actor) (born 1949), Serbian actor
- Miodrag Krivokapić (footballer) (born 1959), Montenegrin former footballer
