= Tamara Šoletić =

Croatian actress

- Born: 21 October 1965 (age 59); Zadar, SR Croatia, SFR Yugoslavia
- Occupation: Actress
- Years active: 1989–present

Tamara Šoletić (born 21 October 1965) is a Croatian actress.

== Early life ==
Tamara graduated from the University of Zadar, Department of Education at the Faculty of Arts. Then, she got a job as a music teacher in elementary school and was employed as an actress and puppet maker since 1989, in the Zadar Puppet Theater. In addition to regular jobs, she worked as head of the reciter on the promotion of books. For many years she sang in a Dalmatian female klapa "Viola" and worked as a manager and an associate at Omiš klapa festival. She has worked with NK Zadar, in "It was the fifth, was the ninth."

== Personal life ==
Tamara is the mother of two children.

== Filmography ==
Film
Year	Title	Role	Notes
2007-2008	Zauvijek susjedi	Ljiljana "Lili" Ferdić	
2008-2009	Sve će biti dobro	Doctor	
2009-2010	Dolina sunca	Loreta	
2011-2012	Ruža vjetrova	Adrijana Jelavić	
2013	Little Giant	TV-host	Drama film
2014	Tlo pod nogama	Mom	Short film
2016-2017	Zlatni dvori	Žana Zlokić	
