= Ksenija Pajić =

Croatian actress

- Born: 30 June 1961 (age 65); Rijeka, PR Croatia, FPR Yugoslavia
- Occupation: Actress
- Years active: 1985–present

Ksenija Pajić (born 30 June 1961) is a Croatian actress. She has appeared in more than fifty films since 1985.

== Selected filmography ==
Film
Year	Title	Role	Notes
1985	Three for Happiness	Jagoda	
1987	Officer with a Rose	Matilda Ivančić	
1988	The Glembays	Fanika Canjeg	
1990	Eagle		
1993	Countess Dora	Stefi Geyer	
1998	When the Dead Start Singing	Stana	
1999	Marshal Tito's Spirit	Danica Skulić	
2012	Vegetarian Cannibal	Patient Švarc	
2013	Hush	Jelena	
2018	For Good Old Times	Milka	
2025	The Pavilion		It will open 31st Sarajevo Film Festival

TV
Year	Title	Role	Notes
2010–2011	Najbolje godine	Suzana Gajs	Antagonist
2013–2014	Tajne	Brigita Franić	Main antagonist
2014–2015	Vatre ivanjske	Elena Župan Magdić	Antagonist
2016–2020	Novine	Julijana Tomašević	
2017–2018	Čista ljubav	Edita Leskovar	Co-Protagonist
2020–present	Dar mar	Co-Protagonist	Božena Bajić
