= List of Kud puklo da puklo episodes =

Kud puklo da puklo is a Croatian television series that aired on Nova TV. The series ran from 15 September 2014 to 9 June 2016 and has spawned 350 episodes over two seasons.

== Series overview ==
Season	Episodes	Originally released	
Season	Episodes	First released	Last released
1	171	15 September 2014	7 June 2015
2	179	7 September 2015	9 June 2016

== Episodes ==
=== Season 1 (2014–15) ===
No. overall	No. in season	Title	Original release date
1	1	"Granpa's death"	15 September 2014
2	2	"The Will"	16 September 2014
3	3	"In the race for inheritance"	17 September 2014
4	4	"The Video"	18 September 2014
5	5	"The Globe"	19 September 2014
6	6	"Spiritual Exercises"	22 September 2014
7	7	"The Chase for Katarina"	23 September 2014
8	8	"The Tattoo"	24 September 2014
9	9	"The Birthrate"	25 September 2014
10	10	"The Set for the Dance"	26 September 2014
11	11	"The Dance and the Statue"	29 September 2014
12	12	"In the Chase for the Statue"	30 September 2014
13	13	"New Member in the Board"	1 October 2014
14	14	"The Proposal"	2 October 2014
15	15	"Hund"	3 October 2014
16	16	"The Wedding near the Globe"	6 October 2014
17	17	"In the Otter Hunt"	7 October 2014
18	18	"The Bride and the Groom"	8 October 2014
19	19	"The Poacher"	9 October 2014
20	20	"The Set for the Campaign"	10 October 2014
21	21	"Political Meeting"	13 October 2014
22	22	"The Confrontation - Part I -"	14 October 2014
23	23	"The Confrontation - Part II -"	15 October 2014
24	24	"Snježana's New Boyfriend"	16 October 2014
25	25	"The Elections"	17 October 2014
26	26	"Barbara's Governance"	20 October 2014
27	27	"Sveta's Problem"	21 October 2014
28	28	"Stipe and Mile"	22 October 2014
29	29	"In the Jail"	23 October 2014
30	30	"Regulation"	24 October 2014
31	31	"For Mande"	27 October 2014
32	32	"The Return of the Statue"	28 October 2014
33	33	"The Place in the Board"	29 October 2014
34	34	"The Revenge"	30 October 2014
35	35	"The Search"	31 October 2014
36	36	"Grandchildren vs. Village"	3 November 2014
37	37	"Cow & Boar"	4 November 2014
38	38	"War & Peace"	5 November 2014
39	39	"The Bullfight"	6 November 2014
40	40	"The Celebration"	7 November 2014
41	41	"Goga's Intrigue"	10 November 2014
42	42	"The Chief Inspector and The Other Stories"	11 November 2014
43	43	"The Sign of Love"	12 November 2014
44	44	"Accident"	13 November 2014
45	45	"It Went Ljubo"	14 November 2014
46	46	"The Tax Inspection - Part I -"	17 November 2014
47	47	"The Tax Inspection - Part II -"	18 November 2014
48	48	"The Tax Inspection - Part III -"	19 November 2014
49	49	"The Tax Inspection - Part IV -"	20 November 2014
50	50	"Unmoral Acts"	24 November 2014
51	51	"The Letter"	25 November 2014
52	52	"The Border - Part I -"	26 November 2014
53	53	"The Border - Part II -"	27 November 2014
54	54	"The Chase"	28 November 2014
55	55	"When Luck Turns You Back"	1 December 2014
56	56	"The Decision"	2 December 2014
57	57	"The School"	3 December 2014
58	58	"Bachelor Party"	4 December 2014
59	59	"The Hoax"	5 December 2014
60	60	"The Gifts for The Newlyweds"	8 December 2014
61	61	"Goga and Nediljko - Part I -"	9 December 2014
62	62	"Goga and Nediljko - Part II -"	10 December 2014
63	63	"Goga and Nediljko - Part III -"	11 December 2014
64	64	"The Local Board"	12 December 2014
65	65	"The Above"	15 December 2014
66	66	"The Break"	16 December 2014
67	67	"The Rivals"	17 December 2014
68	68	"The Solution is Katarina"	18 December 2014
69	69	"Operation "Katarina""	23 December 2014
70	70	"Oštrovac Resistance"	24 December 2014
71	71	"The Turnover of Situation"	25 December 2014
72	72	"The Bishop"	26 December 2014
73	73	"Mirko & His Lover - Part I -"	29 December 2014
74	74	"Mirko & His Lover - Part II -"	30 December 2014
75	75	"The President of the Board"	31 December 2014
76	76	"The OCCOC -Part I-"	19 January 2015
77	77	"The OCCOC -Part II-"	20 January 2015
78	78	"Krešal"	21 January 2015
79	79	"Ane for the president"	22 January 2015
80	80	"The Restaurant -Part I-"	26 January 2015
81	81	"The Restaurant -Part II-"	27 January 2015
82	82	"With Jack in the hunt"	28 January 2015
83	83	"Cook & Widow"	29 January 2015
84	84	"Doctor in the Park"	2 February 2015
85	85	"Who Called The Inspection?"	3 February 2015
86	86	"Ruža's Plan"	4 February 2015
87	87	"In The Eve of Beauty Contest"	5 February 2015
88	88	"Miss -Part I-"	9 February 2015
89	89	"Miss -Part II-"	10 February 2015
90	90	"The Travel To the Ministry"	11 February 2015
91	91	"The Fall of The Park"	12 February 2015
92	92	"The Demotion"	16 February 2015
93	93	"The Investors"	17 February 2015
94	94	"The Sawmill"	18 February 2015
95	95	"The Fraud"	19 February 2015
96	96	"The Run"	23 February 2015
97	97	"Suicide Situation"	24 February 2015
98	98	"The Forest"	25 February 2015
99	99	"Radio "Kuna" -Part I-"	26 February 2015
100	100	"Radio "Kuna" -Part II-"	2 March 2015
101	101	"Another Election Silence"	3 March 2015
102	102	"The Globe in Krasinac"	4 March 2015
103	103	"The Real Guilt"	5 March 2015
104	104	"Brandy and The Other Things"	9 March 2015
105	105	"The Potato -Part I-"	10 March 2015
106	106	"The Potato -Part II-"	11 March 2015
107	107	"Ring, Wedding & Meet"	12 March 2015
108	108	"Sex, Birth & Theft"	15 March 2015
109	109	"The Truth"	16 March 2015
110	110	"Paternity, Brandy & Supervisor"	17 March 2015
111	111	"In The Chase for The Still"	18 March 2015
112	112	"Real Drama"	19 March 2015
113	113	"Middleman in Jail"	22 March 2015
114	114	"Operation "Middleman""	23 March 2015
115	115	"The Nastiness"	24 March 2015
116	116	"Mr. & Mrs. Tepavac"	25 March 2015
117	117	"It Went Srećko"	26 March 2015
118	118	"Death in the Family"	29 March 2015
119	119	"Bear & Will"	30 March 2015
120	120	"Pregnant & Bear - Part I"	31 March 2015
121	121	"Pregnant & Bear - Part II"	1 April 2015
122	122	"Pregnant & Bear - Part III"	2 April 2015
123	123	"The Bet"	5 April 2015
124	124	"Another Truth"	6 April 2015
125	125	"The Last Hope"	7 April 2015
126	126	"Price To Be Paid"	8 April 2015
127	127	"The Redemption"	9 April 2015
128	128	"Kreša's Return"	12 April 2015
129	129	"When Grandchildren Aren't In The Village"	13 April 2015
130	130	"The Distraught Milica"	14 April 2015
131	131	"Hit-and-Run, Child & Painting"	15 April 2015
132	132	"Picture & Opportunity - Part I"	16 April 2015
133	133	"Picture & Opportunity - Part II"	19 April 2015
134	134	"Picture & Opportunity - Part III"	20 April 2015
135	135	"The Fourth Grandchild"	21 April 2015
136	136	"The Sisters"	22 April 2015
137	137	"The Stranger"	23 April 2015
138	138	"The Fiance"	26 April 2015
139	139	"The Proposal"	27 April 2015
140	140	"Birthday, Band & Lovers"	28 April 2015
141	141	"Lovers Revealed"	29 April 2015
142	142	"Wild Village"	30 April 2015
143	143	"Each Defending Its Interests"	3 May 2015
144	144	"The Problem That Must Be Solved"	4 May 2015
145	145	"The Dog - Part I"	5 May 2015
146	146	"The Dog -Part II-"	6 May 2015
147	147	"Attack Without Warning"	7 May 2015
148	148	"Movie, Proposal & Vatican"	10 May 2015
149	149	"Marriage & Marriage"	11 May 2015
150	150	"Mr. & Mrs. Mamić"	12 May 2015
151	151	"The Confiscation"	13 May 2015
152	152	"The Donation"	14 May 2015
153	153	"The Ring"	15 May 2015
154	154	"On The Barricades"	17 May 2015
155	155	"Mara's Pension -Part I-"	18 May 2015
156	156	"Mara's Pension -Part II-"	19 May 2015
157	157	"The Supermarket -Part I-"	20 May 2015
158	158	"The Supermarket -Part II-"	21 May 2015
159	159	"The Kiss and the Blackmail"	24 May 2015
160	160	"The Jealousy"	25 May 2015
161	161	"The Referendum"	26 May 2015
162	162	"Ring & Deceased"	27 May 2015
163	163	"One Meeting & One Funeral"	28 May 2015
164	164	"Decision"	31 May 2015
165	165	"Battle for Inheritance -Part I-"	1 June 2015
166	166	"Battle for Inheritance - Part II"	2 June 2015
167	167	"Battle for Inheritance - Part III"	3 June 2015
168	168	"Lawyer in The Run"	4 June 2015
169	169	"Who Stole The Money?"	5 June 2015
170	170	"Covered Debts"	6 June 2015
171	171	"Mr. & Mrs. Gavran"	7 June 2015

=== Season 2 (2015–16) ===
No. overall	No. in season	Title	Original release date
172	1	"The Hotel"	7 September 2015
173	2	"The Deadman"	8 September 2014
173	2	"The Deadman"	8 September 2015
174	3	"In The Search for The Diamonds"	9 September 2015
175	4	"Funeral, Divorce and The Diamonds"	10 September 2015
176	5	"Road Travel Marko Došen"	11 September 2015
177	6	"Return to Oštrovac"	14 September 2015
178	7	"The Internet"	15 September 2015
179	8	"The Transmitter or The Agronomy"	16 September 2015
180	9	"The Protest"	17 September 2015
181	10	"In the Eve of Bullfighting - Part I"	18 September 2015
182	11	"In the Eye of Bullfighting - Part II"	21 September 2015
183	12	"In the Eye of Bullfighting - Part III"	22 September 2015
184	13	"The Second Bullfighting and the Concert"	23 September 2015
185	14	"Help for Sveto"	24 September 2015
186	15	"The Investigation"	25 September 2015
187	16	"Dario's Daughters"	28 September 2015
188	17	"Infertility, Paintball, and the Hamster"	29 September 2015
189	18	"The Advertisement for the Hotel"	30 September 2015
190	19	"The Kiss and the Forced Labor"	1 October 2015
191	20	"The Agronomists and the Other Things"	2 October 2015
192	21	"In the Eye of the Christening - Part I"	5 October 2015
193	22	"In the Eye of the Christening - Part II"	6 October 2015
194	23	"The Christening"	7 October 2015
195	24	"Mile's Plan"	8 October 2015
196	25	"The Problem with Barbara"	9 October 2015
197	26	"The Opponent - Part I"	12 October 2015
198	27	"The Opponent - Part II"	13 October 2015
199	28	"Jeopardy, Hamster, and the Supply"	14 October 2015
200	29	"Oštrovac Elects"	15 October 2015
201	30	"President Žeravica"	16 October 2015
202	31	"The Sabotage"	19 October 2015
203	32	"The Bingo"	20 October 2015
204	33	"The Extraction"	21 October 2015
205	34	"The Role"	22 October 2015
206	35	"The Producer, Mate's Upbringing, and Slave's Turnout"	23 October 2015
207	36	"The Gay"	26 October 2015
208	37	"Danger Over the Village"	27 October 2015
209	38	"The Assyles - Part I"	28 October 2015
210	39	"The Assyles - Part II"	29 October 2015
211	40	"The Assyles - Part III"	30 October 2015
212	41	"The Prencipt Oštrovac"	2 November 2015
213	42	"The Robbers - Part I"	3 November 2015
214	43	"The Robbers - Part II"	4 November 2015
215	44	"Jela's Funeral"	5 November 2015
216	45	"The Undertaker, the Painters and Moving In"	6 November 2015
217	46	"Lidija Božić Cometh"	9 November 2015
218	47	"Pregnant Woman, Examination and Curling"	10 November 2015
219	48	"The Good News and the Bad News"	11 November 2015
220	49	"Only Bad News"	12 November 2015
221	50	"Neither Daughter-in-Law, Neither Grandchild"	13 November 2015
222	51	"Road Travel Zdenka Gavran"	16 November 2015
223	52	"Srećkohunt"	17 November 2015
224	53	"Mrs. Tepavac and Mrs. Gavran Regrets"	18 November 2015
225	54	"Marriage Whirlpool"	19 November 2015
226	55	"Jack's Return"	20 November 2015
227	56	"Help for Dario"	23 November 2015
228	57	"A Lot of Problems"	24 November 2015
229	58	"Family Meetings"	25 November 2015
230	59	"Family Problems"	26 November 2015
231	60	"The Road of the Hunting"	27 November 2015
232	61	"Cheating and the Other Things"	30 November 2015
233	62	"New President"	1 December 2015
234	63	"Mad Dario"	2 December 2015
235	64	"Gavran vs. Gavran"	3 December 2015
236	65	"President Is..."	4 December 2015
237	66	"First Meeting of the New Board"	7 December 2015
238	67	"The Concession"	8 December 2015
239	68	"In the Evening of the Bowling"	9 December 2015
240	69	"The Bowling"	10 December 2015
241	70	"Purchasing the Hotel - Part I"	11 December 2015
242	71	"Purchasing the Hotel - Part II"	14 December 2015
243	72	"Purchasing the Hotel - Part III"	15 December 2015
244	73	"Death of Mr. Prpa"	16 December 2015
245	74	"Who Is the Killer?"	17 December 2015
246	75	"Poor Jack"	18 December 2015
247	76	"Folklore and the Other Problems"	20 December 2015
248	77	"In the Evening of the Competition"	21 December 2015
249	78	"The Winners"	22 December 2015
250	79	"35 Years of Marriage"	23 December 2015
251	80	"The President in Oštrovac"	24 December 2015
252	81	"OCCOC"	25 December 2015
253	82	"The Guilt"	27 December 2015
254	83	"Operation "President""	28 December 2015
255	84	"The Curse Village"	30 January 2016
256	85	"Trolley, Baby, Trap, Plan"	31 January 2016
257	86	"Forest Ranger"	1 February 2016
258	87	"Downfall - Part I"	2 February 2016
259	88	"Downfall - Part II"	3 February 2016
260	89	"Stipe's Plan"	4 February 2016
261	90	"The Fair"	7 February 2016
262	91	"The Earthquake"	8 February 2016
263	92	"The Beautician and the CDs"	9 February 2016
264	93	"Jealousy, Interview and Miranda"	10 February 2016
265	94	"The Striptease"	11 February 2016
266	95	"The Priest and Expectant Mother - Part I"	14 February 2016
267	96	"The Priest and Expectant Mother - Part II"	15 February 2016
268	97	"The Priest and Expectant Mother - Part III"	16 February 2016
269	98	"The Expectant Mother and the Cook"	17 February 2016
270	99	"The Marital Counseling and the Internet"	18 February 2016
271	100	"In the Evening of the Nuptial"	21 February 2016
272	101	"The Nuptial - Part I"	22 February 2016
273	102	"The Nuptial - Part II"	23 February 2016
274	103	"A Cop Undercover"	24 February 2016
275	104	"The Secret Is Revealed"	25 February 2016
276	105	"The Arrest"	28 February 2016
277	106	"The Arrested"	29 February 2016
278	107	"The Case Is Closed"	1 March 2016
279	108	"The Sportsman"	2 March 2016
280	109	"The Gym and Jodi"	3 March 2016
281	110	"The Job"	6 March 2016
282	111	"In the Evening of the Match"	7 March 2016
283	112	"The Match"	8 March 2016
284	113	"Someone in the Dark, Someone in the Light"	9 March 2016
285	114	"About Franja"	10 March 2016
286	115	"The Priest Perversions"	13 March 2016
287	116	"In the Evening of the Celebration - Part I"	14 March 2016
288	117	"In the Evening of the Celebration - Part II"	15 March 2016
289	118	"In the Evening of the Celebration - Part III"	16 March 2016
290	119	"Chase, Adoption and Will"	17 March 2016
291	120	"Question of Honor"	18 March 2016
292	121	"Right Choice"	21 March 2016
293	122	"The Robbery"	22 March 2016
294	123	"Mr. and Mrs. Božić"	23 March 2016
295	124	"Different Roles"	24 March 2016
296	125	"All the Best"	25 March 2016
297	126	"Guests in Hotel"	28 March 2016
298	127	"The Swingers - Part I"	29 March 2016
299	128	"The Swingers - Part II"	30 March 2016
300	129	"Operation "Hotel""	31 March 2016
301	130	"Sodoma and Gomorrah"	1 April 2016
302	131	"Kidnapping, Parents and Camp"	4 April 2016
303	132	"Love and Polygon"	5 April 2016
304	133	"Status Quo"	6 April 2016
305	134	"A Few Good Men"	7 April 2016
306	135	"Film & Death"	8 April 2016
307	136	"Milica & Candidature"	11 April 2016
308	137	"Milica's Condition"	12 April 2016
309	138	"The Candidate"	13 April 2016
310	139	"Engagement & Birthday"	14 April 2016
311	140	"Operation "Candidate""	15 April 2016
312	141	"Oštrovac Chaos - Part I"	18 April 2016
313	142	"Oštrovac Chaos - Part II"	19 April 2016
314	143	"Taken"	20 April 2016
315	144	"Mysteries of Oštrovac"	21 April 2016
316	145	"Political Games"	22 April 2016
317	146	"The Boycott"	25 April 2016
318	147	"Right in Front of the Registrar"	26 April 2016
319	148	"Case of Missing Statue"	27 April 2016
320	149	"Home for Retirement and Orphans"	28 April 2016
321	150	"To Everyone Something Is Going"	29 April 2016
322	151	"Scandal in Retirement Home"	2 May 2016
323	152	"Crazy Excesses"	3 May 2016
324	153	"In Chase for Srećko"	4 May 2016
325	154	"On Sufferance"	5 May 2016
326	155	"Newcomers"	6 May 2016
327	156	"Kids - Part I"	9 May 2016
328	157	"Kids - Part II"	10 May 2016
329	158	"Happy Family"	11 May 2016
330	159	"The Cheese and the Grandson"	12 May 2016
331	160	"Grandfathers and Grandkids"	13 May 2016
332	161	"Godfathering - Part I"	16 May 2016
333	162	"Godfathering - Part II"	17 May 2016
334	163	"Unpopular Measures"	18 May 2016
335	164	"The Village Prior to Disappearance"	19 May 2016
336	165	"Collective - Part I"	20 May 2016
337	166	"Collective - Part II"	23 May 2016
338	167	"Serious Problems"	24 May 2016
339	168	"Krasinac Collective"	25 May 2016
340	169	"Rivals"	26 May 2016
341	170	"Roko"	27 May 2016
342	171	"Sadness and Despair"	30 May 2016
343	172	"Nadan is Back"	31 May 2016
344	173	"Suspicious Offer"	1 June 2016
345	174	"Evil Intents"	2 June 2016
346	175	"The Departures"	3 June 2016
347	176	"Sinking Ship - Part I"	6 June 2016
348	177	"Sinking Ship - Part II"	7 June 2016
349	178	"Reborn Village - Part I"	8 June 2016
350	179	"Reborn Village - Part II"	9 June 2016
