= List of Kud puklo da puklo (TV series) recurring characters =

This is a list of recurring characters from the television series Kud puklo da puklo (Whichever Way the Ball Bounces), a Croatian comedy telenovela produced by Nova TV.

== Characters ==
=== Don Ante Rukavina ===
- First appearance: Episode 1.11
- Last appearance: Unknown
- Portrayed by: Slavko Juraga

Don Ante is a priest from Krasinac, a village near Oštrovac. He entered many times in conflict with people from Oštrovac. During season one, he tries to set up Don Mirko with false love letters from "Mistress". Later it is revealed that he and Barbara were set up. In season two, Don Ante became a priest for Oštrovac because Mirko became vicar in Vatican. But in episode 96 of season 2, Don Ante returned to Krasinac because Bishop Andrija hired a new priest for Oštrovac.

=== Vjekoslav "Vjeko" Bokarica ===
- First appearance: Episode 1.54
- Last appearance:
- Portrayed by: Robert Ugrina

Vjeko is a character from Krasinac. He has a brother his name is Mrki. They are always together. And they hate Damir and Josip. In season two of Krasinac Vjeko became a new ranger in the woods with the help of Don Ante, who set up Damir. It is revealed in season two, through the conversation between Milica and Undertaker Stojan, that his uncle's last name is Bokarica.

=== Zlatko "Mrki" Bokarica ===
- First appearance: Episode 1.54
- Last appearance:
- Portrayed by: Igor Hamer

Mrki is Vjeko's brother. In season two, it is revealed in a conversation between Vjeko, Mile, Stipe and him that his real name is Zlatko. It is revealed in season two through the conversation between Milica and Undertaker Stojan, his uncle, that his last name is Bokarica.

=== Srećko Vrbota ===
- First appearance: Episode 1.106
- Last appearance:
- Portrayed by: Saša Anočić

Srećko is Diana's real father. He came to Oštrovac to help Josip with brandy and met Barbara on the street. He followed her to her home and they had sex and Diana caught them. Josip later discovered that Srećko is Diana's father. Later in season one, Srećko is arrested, but in season two, he is released from jail and he returned to Oštrovac, where he found out that he is going to be a grandfather of twins.

=== Ivka Crnjak-Baburić ===
- First appearance: Episode 1.50
- Last appearance: Episode 1.118
- Portrayed by: LJubica Jović

Ivka is Zdenka's mother, Mile's mother-in-law and Damir's grandmother. She was some time in Oštrovac. When she wanted to return to her flat, she was scared by a bear on the street and had a heart attack and died.

=== Dr. Denis Osvaldić ===
- First appearance: Episode 1.1
- Last appearance: Episode 1.145
- Portrayed by: Mislav Čavajda

Denis was Katarina's boyfriend in season one. She broke up with him when she discovered that he faked his broken arm. Later he tried to steal a part of the inherited money with help of his new girlfriend who presented as Marko's second daughter. When that is discovered, they run to Zagreb. From then on, he was neither heard nor seen again.

=== Old Mrs. Milka ===
- First appearance: Episode 1.13
- Last appearance: Episode 1.63
- Portrayed by: Edita Karađole

Mrs. Milka is an old lady from Oštrovac. She was a temporary president of the board in season one. Later, Mile replaced her and became president for the second time. She died suddenly on Mile's lawnmower.

=== Old Mrs. Ika ===
- First appearance: Episode 2.26
- Last appearance:
- Portrayed by: Asja Jovanović

Mrs. Ika is an old lady from Oštrovac. She has many sheep, and each of the sheep has a name.

=== Stanislav Tokić ===
- First appearance: Episode 2.1
- Last appearance: Episode 2.88
- Portrayed by: Ranko Zidarić

Stanislav is a criminal who came to Oštrovac to dig up diamonds which he buried. He was the first guest of the hotel. When he was in the bathroom in his suit he was hit by electricity. He staggered to the stairs and fell down them. His body was found by Sveto. Dario and Miranda buried him under the name of Mladen Horvat in episode 2. In episode 88, when Dario tried to sell one diamond Zagreb it seemed to him that he saw late Stanislav. Later is revealed that he is Tina's real father. He wrote will in which Tina got some of his paintings, priced at 650000 kuna's, but she has to marry before 25th birthday, and if she marries before 25th she can't marry the policeman.

=== Suzana Žeravica ===
- First appearance: Episode 2.15
- Last appearance:
- Portrayed by: Sandra Lončarić

Suzana is Dario's ex-wife and mother of Sara and Tina. She hates Miranda. She came to Oštrovac to see what Dario is doing and later in season two, she joined in the search for diamonds. In episode 104, she, Miranda, and Dario were arrested by Stipe for selling stolen diamonds.
