= Will Not End Here =

- Directed by: Vinko Bresan
- Written by: Mate Matišić
- Starring: Ivan Herceg; Nada Šargin; Mladen Vulić; Leon Lučev; Ljubomir Kerekeš
- Release date: 27 May 2008
- Running time: 100 min
- Countries: Croatia; Serbia
- Language: Croatian

Will Not End Here (Nije kraj) is a 2008 Croatian / Serbian co-production directed by Vinko Brešan.

== Cast ==
The cast also includes Luka Peroš best known for his role of Marseille in Money Heist.

- Ivan Herceg - Martin
- Nada Šargin - Desa
- Predrag Vušović - Djuro
- Inge Appelt - Marija / Jacqueline
- Dražen Kühn - Kriminalac
- Mladen Vulić - Nikola
- Leon Lučev - Martinov kolega
- Damir Orlic - Martinov kolega II
- Ljubomir Kerekeš - Doktor
- Luka Peroš - Vojvoda
- Robert Ugrina - Border policeman
- Luka Juričić - Jacqueline's grandson
- Alen Šalinović - Gluhak
