= Frane Perišin =

Croatian actor

- Born: 13 July 1960 (age 64); Split, PR Croatia, FPR Yugoslavia
- Occupation: Actor
- Years active: 1980–present
- Spouse: Mirela Banić

Frane Perišin (born 13 July 1960) is a Croatian actor.

== Filmography ==
=== Television roles ===
Film
| Year | Title | Role | Notes |
|---|---|---|---|
| 1981 | Velo misto | Marinko | Guest star |
| 2009 | Stipe u gostima | Šunje | Guest star |
| 2012 | Nikol, povjerljivo | Tonči Zlatar | Guest star - web series |
| 2011–2013 | Larin izbor | Tonči Zlatar | Main cast |
| 2013–2014 | Zora dubrovačka | Lovro Kordić | Supporting role |
| 2014–2015 | Vatre ivanjske | Božo Magdić | Main cast |

=== Movie roles ===
Film
| Year | Title | Role | Notes |
|---|---|---|---|
| 2011 | Bella biondina | Frane | |
| 2009 | Ljubavni život domobrana | General | |
| 2009 | Vjerujem u anđele | Captain | |
| 2001 | Dubrovački škerac | / | TV film |
