= Larin izbor =

Croatian telenovela

- Starring: Ivan Herceg; Doris Pinčić; Filip Juričić; Frane Perišin; Ecija Ojdanić; Marija Kohn
- Music by: Tonči Huljić
- Opening theme: "Samo jubav ostaje" by Tonči Huljić and Marko Pecotić Peco
- Country of origin: Croatia
- Original language: Croatian
- No. of seasons: 2
- No. of episodes: 347

Production
- Running time: 45 minutes

Original release
- Network: Nova TV
- Release: September 4, 2011 – July 3, 2013

Related
- Najbolje godine; Zora dubrovačka

Larin izbor (Croatian for 'Lara's Choice') is a Croatian telenovela created by Jelena Veljača and written by Tomislav Hrpka. The series premiered on September 4, 2011 on Nova TV. Doris Pinčić and Ivan Herceg are main protagonists, while Ecija Ojdanić, Filip Juričić, Jagoda Kumrić, Sanja Popović and Janko Popović Volarić are villains/antagonists, with support cast of Marija Kohn and Frane Perišin. In Pakistan, the show was broadcast on Urdu 1 retitled Lara Ki Kahani.

== Synopsis ==
Lara Božić is a young and simple girl who lives and works in Split. Although an educated musician, she works as an assistant cook at a catering service. Owners of the catering service offer her a job as a waitress at a Zlatar family banquet. The Zlatar family is an aristocratic family. At the banquet, Lara meets Jakov Zlatar, a young, well-raised young man from a respectable family. Jakov returned to Split after several years and his mother Nela had prepared a party in his honor. Jakov is not interested in the world that his mother and father try to impose on him, with the young girl catching his eye. Jakov and Lara fall in love at first sight and spend the evening together. After a passionate night in the garden, Nela catches them and expels Lara from the Zlatar property. Because he failed to prevent his mother's act, Jakov feels embarrassed and asks Lara for forgiveness.

Nela Zlatar is a proud woman obsessed with the family's image and the continuation of the respected Zlatar bloodline. She is convinced that Lara approached Jakov only to enter their family and to destroy Jakov's career as a successful sea captain. Jakov needs to leave for work abroad but before his departure, he proposes to Lara. The two get married. Jakov brings Lara back into the Zlatar house and tells everyone that Lara is now his legal wife. Lara's world starts to change dramatically. She is left to the mercy of Nela and Jakov's younger sister Nikol.

== Seasons ==
Season	Number of episodes	Series Premiere	Series Finale
Season 1	182	September 4, 2011	June 20, 2012
Season 2	165	September 23, 2012	July 3, 2013

== Cast ==
=== Protagonists and supporting roles ===
Actor	Character	Duration
Doris Pinčić	Lara Zlatar (née Božić)	2011–2013
Ivan Herceg	Jakov "Jaša" Zlatar	2011–2013
Jana Milić	Leila Bilić (formerly Vidić)	2011–2013
Ecija Ojdanić	Antonela "Nela" Zlatar (née Radošić)	2011–2013
Mladen Vulić	Alen Dijak	2011–2013
Tamara Garbajs	Vjera Dijak	2011–2013
Ornela Vištica	Karmen Sita	2011–2013
Stefan Kapičić	Nikša Ivanov	2011–2013
Jagoda Kurmić	Nikolina "Nikol" Zlatar-Škopljanac	2011–2013
Dino Rogić	Mate Škopljanac	2011–2013
Sanja Vejnović	Mija Božić-Petrović	2011–2013
Marija Kohn	Anđela Zlatar	2011–2013
Frane Perišin	Tonči Zlatar	2011–2013
Edita Karađole	Cvitka Radošić	2011–2013
Vlasta Knezović	Kike	2011
Helena Buljan	Kike	2011–2013
Mark Urem	Jakov "Zlaja" Zlatar	2011–2012
David Šikić	Jakov "Zlaja" Zlatar	2012–2013

=== Villains ===
Actor	Character	Duration
Filip Juričić	Dinko Bilić	2011–2013
Sanja Popović	Dalia	2012–2013
Janko Popović Volarić	Lucijan Krstulović	2012–2013

=== Abandoned the series ===
Actor	Character	Duration
Branimir Popović	Šimun Santini †	2012–2013
Ana Maras	Anita	2011–2012
Andrej Dojkić	Maro	2011–2012
Marija Tadić	Lidija Bilić	2011–2012
Milan Štrljić	Vuksan Petrović †	2011–2012
Franko Jakovčević	Filip Kelava	2011–2012
Karlo Mrkša	Jure Šoštarić †	2011
Nada Rocco	Alma †	2012
Jasmin Mekić	Kris Vidić †	2011
Bruna Bebić-Tudor	Blanka Bilić †	2011–2012
Zoran Pribičević	Dorian Damjanović †	2012
Marija Karan	Anastasija Popović	2012
Miraj Grbić	Džin	2012
Luka Peroš	Crni	2012
Predrag Petrović	Branko †	2012
Željko Vukmirica	knez Nikola Popović †	2012

== Ratings ==
The show premiered on Sunday September 4, 2011 with domestic share of 11,9%. Its 50th episode was watched by a record-breaking 1,2 million viewers. It is the most-watched scripted show in Croatia, attracting more viewers that the national news, Dnevnik, which used to be an all-time ratings leader in Croatia. The title track translated into Arabic and has achieved success in Egypt and Dubai (Samo ljubav ostaje-https://www.youtube.com/watch?v=pld3D1xMRsw).

== Broadcasting ==
Country	TV network(s)	Series premiere	Series end	Time slot
Croatia	Nova TV	September 4, 2011	July 3, 2013	20:00
Bosnia and Herzegovina	RTRS; FTV; BN; OBN	September 5, 2011	July 3, 2013	17:05h 21:00
North Macedonia	Kanal 5	September 5, 2011		
Slovenia	POP TV	September 12, 2011	June 20, 2013	17:45
Bulgaria	bTV bTV Lady	March 28, 2012	July 12, 2015	17:30/13:30/12:00
Slovakia	TV Doma	May 28, 2012	July 21, 2013	16:30
Romania	Acasă	May 29, 2012		18:30
Iran	Farsi1	July 28, 2012		22:00
Montenegro	TV Vijesti	August 27, 2012		19:10
Greece	ANT 1	July 8, 2013		21:25
Egypt	CBC Egypt	February 2, 2013		18:00
Serbia	B92 (S1 E1-117)	March 18, 2013	December 12, 2013	19:00
Serbia	Prva TV (S2)	April 24, 2015	December 2, 2015	
Italy	RAI			
Ukraine				
Pakistan	Urdu 1			
Czech Republic	Telka	June 3, 2013		10:55
Romania	Acasă	May 12, 2014		18:30
Morocco	2M TV	September 23, 2014	July 2015	18:30
Vietnam	THVL 1	September 27, 2018	present	13:00
