= Večernja škola =

- Also known as: Večernja škola: Povratak upisanih (2005–06); Večernja škola: Praksa (2007); Večernja škola: EU (2007–08)
- Genre: Improvisational comedy
- Created by: Željko Pervan
- Country of origin: Croatia
- Original language: Croatian

Production
- Production location: Zagreb Puppet Theatre (2005–06)
- Running time: 30 min (2005–06); 40–50 min (2007–08)

Original release
- Network: OTV
- Release: 1995 – 1998
- Network: HRT 2
- Release: 11 March 2005 – 12 May 2006
- Network: Nova TV
- Release: 2007 – 2008

Večernja škola (English: The Evening School) is a Croatian improvisational comedy television series hosted by Željko Pervan. The series stars Pervan as a teacher of a night school class that discusses and learns about various political and social topics.

The series originally aired on OTV between 1995 and 1998. After achieving considerable popularity in the region, it moved to HRT 2 as Večernja škola: Povratak upisanih from 2005 to 2006. From 2007 to 2008, Nova TV aired the spin-offs Večernja škola: Praksa and Večernja škola: EU.

== Premise ==
The show is largely improvisational and spontaneous, with Pervan portraying a teacher who leads a group of students in satirical debates on various political and societal issues. The majority of comedy stems from the students' poor understanding of the topics that are discussed.

== Cast ==
=== Main cast ===
- Željko Pervan as Professor Maksimilijan Jure Kučina (all editions)
- Ahmed El Rahim as Antimon "Ante" Čulo (all editions)
- Mladen Horvat as Denis Krokanić (all editions)
- Đuro Utješanović as Tetak Krokanić (all editions)
- Zlatan Zuhrić-Zuhra as Aljoša Kapulica (original and Povratak upisanih)
- Damir Folnegović as Blaženko "Blaž" Sitz (since Povratak upisanih)
- Miroslav Škoro as Ferdo "Mićko" Smičiklas (since Povratak upisanih)
- Maja Kovač as Mojca Stojimirović (EU only)
- Boris Šiber as Marinko Mangacavallo (EU only)

=== Guest cast ===
Notable people that starred in series as guest include Severina, Danijela Martinović and Kemal Monteno.
