= The Border (1996 film) =

- Directed by: Franco Giraldi
- Starring: Raoul Bova; Marco Leonardi; Omero Antonutti
- Cinematography: Cristiano Pogany
- Edited by: Antonio Siciliano
- Music by: Luis Bacalov
- Release date: 1996
- Running time: 110 minutes
- Language: Italian

The Border (Italian: La frontiera) is a 1996 Italian war drama film directed by Franco Giraldi.

== Cast ==
- Raoul Bova as Emidio Orlich
- Marco Leonardi as Franco Velich
- Omero Antonutti as Simeone
- Vesna Tominac Matačić as Melania
- Claudia Pandolfi as Gabriella
- Giancarlo Giannini as Von Zirkenitz
