= Sementa Rajhard =

Croatian actress and singer (born 1991)

- Born: 4 January 1991 (age 35); Rijeka, Croatia, SFR Yugoslavia
- Occupations: Actress and singer
- Years active: 2009–present

Sementa Rajhard (born 4 January 1991) is a Croatian actress and singer.

== Biography ==
Rajhard was born in Rijeka to her father Ladislav and her mother Melita. She grew up in Oroslavje. She sang in church as a member of the choir.

In 2009 she participated in the show Star Search Croatia, and she made her first role in the television series Stella, where she embodied Jasmina Klarić. She also voiced Anna in the Croatian version of Frozen.

== Filmography ==
=== Movie roles ===
Film
Year	Title	Role	Notes
2016	Vrati se, Zone	Kalina	

=== Television roles ===
TV series
Year	Title	Role	Notes
2013	Stella	Jasmina	
2015	Vrati se, Zone	Kalina	
2018	Čista ljubav	Emina Tabaković	

=== Voice acting ===
Film
Year	Title	Role	Notes
2013	Frozen	Anna	Croatian version
