= Igor Kovac =

Igor Kovac may refer to:

- Igor Kováč, Slovak track and field athlete
- Igor Kovač (actor), Croatian actor
