= Mladen Vulić =

Croatian actor

- Born: 1 September 1969 (age 56); Vinkovci, SR Croatia, SFR Yugoslavia
- Occupation: Actor
- Years active: 1996-present

Mladen Vulić (born 1 September 1969) is a Croatian actor. He has appeared in more than thirty films since 1996.

== Selected filmography ==
Film
Year	Title	Role	Notes
2008	Will Not End Here		
2006	The Ghost in the Swamp		
2005	Pušća Bistra		
2005	First Class Thieves		
2004	A Wonderful Night in Split		
2003	Horseman		

TV
Year	Title	Role	Notes
2013	Zora dubrovačka		
2011	Larin izbor		
2006	Balkan Inc.		
