= Fabijan Pavao Medvešek =

- Born: 30 December 1992 (age 33); Zagreb
- Occupation: Actor
- Television: Supertalent
- Father: Rene Medvešek

Fabijan Pavao Medvešek is a Croatian actor. He is best known for his television roles in Dar mar, Na granici and Kumovi. He won the sixth season of Tvoje lice zvuči poznato in 2020. Since 2022, he has been a judge on Supertalent, the Croatian edition of Britain's Got Talent.

== Biography ==
Fabijan Pavao Medvešek was born on 30 December 1992 in Zagreb. He graduated from the Academy of Dramatic Art at the University of Zagreb. He is the son of the actor and director Rene Medvešek.

In 2018, he played Don Božo Dobroslavić in the comedy television series Na granici. In 2020, he won the sixth season of Tvoje lice zvuči poznato.

In 2022, he joined Maja Šuput, Davor Bilman and Martina Tomčić on the judging panel of the Croatian talent show series Supertalent, which airs on Nova TV. In 2024, he joined the cast of the comedy television series Kumovi as Tomislav Cukela.
