= Helena Buljan =

Croatian actress

- Born: 9 July 1941 (age 84); Đurđenovac, Independent State of Croatia
- Occupation: Actress
- Years active: 1964–present

Helena Buljan (born 9 July 1941) is a Croatian actress. She appeared in more than sixty films since 1964.

== Selected filmography ==
Year	Title	Role	Notes
1969	Accidental Life		
2003	Witnesses	Susjeda	
2007	Play Me a Love Song		
