= Ivan Herceg (actor) =

Croatian film and television actor

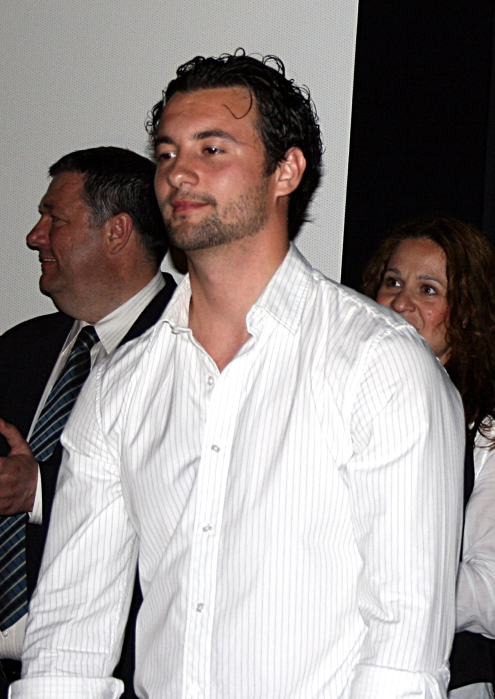
- Born: 2 November 1981 (age 44); Zagreb, SR Croatia, Yugoslavia
- Occupation: Actor
- Years active: 2003–2018
- Height: 6 ft 1 in (185 cm)

Ivan Herceg (born 2 November 1981) is a Croatian actor.

== Filmography ==
=== Television ===
Year	Title	Role	Notes
2005	Kad zvoni?	Zvonko	Guest; 5 episodes
2007	Cimmer fraj	Frenki	Guest; Episode: "Čajanka"
2009–2010	Dolina sunca	Kristijan Vitezović	Main role; 199 episodes
2010–2011	Najbolje godine	Dino Popović	Main role; 96 episodes
2011–2013	Larin izbor	Jakov "Jaša" Zlatar	Main role; 343 episodes
2014–2015	Kud puklo da puklo	Father Mirko Komadina	Supporting role; 171 episodes
2016–2017	Zlatni dvori	Mladen Kozarac	Supporting role; 81 episodes
2017	Čista ljubav	Tomo Vitez	Main role; 78 episodes

=== Film ===
Year	Title	Role	Notes
2003	Here	Karlo	
2007	Play Me a Love Song	Struja	
2007	Žena bez tijela	Martin	
2008	Will Not End Here	Martin	
2011	Lea and Darija	Lea's Principal	Deleted scenes
2012	Larin izbor: Izgubljeni princ	Jakov "Jaša" Zlatar	
