= Mirna Medaković =

Croatian actress (born 1985)

Mirna Medaković Stepinac
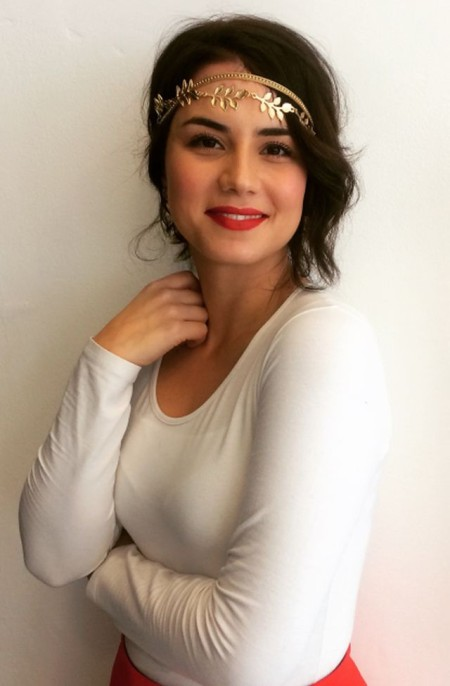
- Born: 20 June 1985 (age 40); Zagreb, SR Croatia, SFR Yugoslavia
- Occupation: Actress
- Years active: 2004–2005; 2008–present
- Spouse: Hrvoje Stepinac
- Children: 2

Mirna Medaković Stepinac (born 20 June 1985) is a Croatian actress.

== Filmography ==
=== Television roles ===
Film
Year	Title	Role	Notes
2004-2005	Zabranjena ljubav	Maja Vuković	Main cast
2008	Ponos Ratkajevih	Rajka	Guest star
2009	Zakon!	Girl in the car shop	Guest star
2008-2009	Sve će biti dobro	Andrijana Macanović	Main cast
2009-2010	Dolina sunca	Sonja Čavar	Main cast
2011	Pod sretnom zvijezdom	Tonka Herceg	Main cast
2011	Provodi i sprovodi	Tatjana	Guest star
2012	Stipe u gostima	Nurse	Guest star
2012	Nedjeljom ujutro, subotom navečer	Maja	Main cast
2012	Ples sa zvijezdama	Herself	Contestant
2013	Počivali u miru	Vanja Posavec	Main cast (s1)
2013	Larin izbor	Esma	Guest star
2013	Zora dubrovačka	Anica Prkačin	Main cast
2014	Budva na pjenu od mora	Ena	Guest star
2014-2016	Kud puklo da puklo	Katarina Došen	Main cast
2024-2025	U dobru i zlu	Marina Srića	Main cast

=== Movie roles ===
Film
Year	Title	Role	Notes
2008	Gdje pingvini lete	Iva	
2010	The Show Must Go On	Tina	
2010	Šuma summarum	Judita	
2012	Noćni brodovi	Tobacconist	
2015	Narodni heroj Ljiljan Vidić	Maša	
