= Suzana Nikolić =

Croatian actress

- Born: Suzana Nikolić; 22 June 1965 (age 60); Županja, SR Croatia, SFR Yugoslavia (now Croatia)
- Occupation: Actress
- Years active: 1979–present
- Spouse: Enes Midžić (m. 1995; div. 2015)

Suzana Nikolić (born 22 June 1965) is a Croatian film, theatre and television actress.

As of 2020, she is teaching acting at the Shanghai Theatre Academy.

== Filmography ==
=== Television roles ===
Film
Year	Title	Role	Notes
1990	Tuđinac	Young Woman	Guest star
2000	Novakovi	/	TV pilot
2004	Zlatni vrč	Marijana Hita	Main cast
2005	Duga mračna noć	Jelka	Guest star
2007	Naša mala klinika	Hloverka Lili	Guest star
2008	Lud, Zbunjen, Normalan	Helena	Guest star
2010	Tito	Marija Broz	Guest star
2013	Na terapiji	Marina	Guest star
2008-2014	Stipe u gostima	Lana Ivić	Main cast
2013-2014	Zora dubrovačka	Nada	Guest star
2014–2016	Kud puklo da puklo	Zdenka Gavran	Main cast

=== Movie roles ===
Film
Year	Title	Role	Notes
1979	Gersla	/	TV film
1980	Došlo doba da se ljubav proba	/	
1981	Ljubi, ljubi, al glavu ne gubi	/	
1988	Sokol ga nije volio	Margita	
1988	Tečaj plivanja	/	TV film
1989	Diploma za smrt	Vlasta	
1989	Leo i Brigita	Ljubica Ljubinović	TV film
1990	Razbijena vaza	Jelena	TV film
1990	Ljeto za sjećanje	Countess	
1990	Lude gljive	/	TV film
1991	Under Cover	Anna	TV film
1992	Papa Sixto V	/	
1992	Jaguar	/	
1994	Vukovar se vraća kući	/	
1995	Olovna pričest	/	TV film
1995	Posebna vožnja	/	TV film
1996	Sedma kronika	Vedrana	
1996	Prepoznavanje	Inspector's Wife	TV film
1998	Tri muškarca Melite Žganjer	Višnja	
1998	Zavaravanje	/	
2000	Pomor tuljana	/	
2001	Holding	Ksenija	
2002	Generalov carski osmijeh	M. Majić Tica	TV film
2004	Radio i ja	/	
2004	Duga mračna noć	Jelka	
2009	Zagrebačke priče	/	
2011	Kotlovina	Seka	
2012	Once Upon a Winter's Night	/	
2013	95 Decibels	Audiologist	
