= Zlatni dvori =

- Genre: Telenovela; Romance; Comedy
- Created by: Goran Rukavina
- Starring: Katarina Baban; Matko Knešaurek; Milan Štrljić; Ecija Ojdanić; Helena Buljan; Lana Ujević; Jan Kerekeš; Duško Valentić; Darko Milas; Sandra Lončarić; Petra Kraljev; Marko Torjanac; Lujo Kunčević; Tamara Šoletić; Robert Kurbaša; Dijana Vidušin; Mladen Kovačić; Danko Ljuština; Hrvoje Barišić; Tonka Kovačić; Martin Lugarić
- Opening theme: "Zlatni dvori" by Colonia i Slavonia band
- Country of origin: Croatia
- Original language: Croatian
- No. of seasons: 1
- No. of episodes: 147

Production
- Production location: Zagreb, Croatia
- Running time: 60 minutes (inc. commercials)
- Production company: Nova TV

Original release
- Network: Nova TV
- Release: September 6, 2016 – June 7, 2017

Zlatni dvori (Golden Palace) is a Croatian telenovela produced by Nova TV. It is an original story, produced in 2016, and starring Katarina Baban, Matko Knešaurek as main protagonists, Petra Kraljev and Ivan Herceg co-star, while Ana Majhenić star as main antagonists. It is also broadcast in Bosnia-Herzegovina and Republic of Macedonia. First season airs from September 6, 2016.

== Plot ==
Zlatni dvori is a story of romance between Ana (Katarina Baban), a village girl who takes care of horses on an estate in Slavonia, and Petar (Matko Knešaurek), a young, rich man, who is kind deep in his soul. Petar's father Vinko (Milan Štrljić), is a business partner with Nikola (Robert Kurbaša), master of estate Ana is working on, and Fedor (Marko Torjanac), father of Petar's fiancée, very spoiled rising singer Nera (Petra Kraljev).

Ana lives with father Antun (Darko Milas), and grandfather Joza (Duško Valentić). One day, there was a wedding in Nikola's and his sister's restaurant, and Petar was on it. Ana left the restaurant and went to see her mare, Plamenka, and Petar followed her. Ana accidentally pushed him in droppings, and he went to Joza to clean his trousers. But then, a fire broke out in the barn where Plamenka and Ana were. Luckily, Petar saved Ana. But then Nera came, and when she saw what's happening, she was very mad on Petar. Nera hates Ana from then, because she wants Petar only for herself: and what Nera wants, she will get it... Later she becomes good and helps Ana gets back to Petar and Nera falls in love with Mladen. Mladen's ex-wife Eva, played by Ana Majhenić, returns to get him back, she starts using tricks to get Mladen back for her. In meanwhile, Irena wants Vinko to sell the house, so they can get back to Zagreb. This makes problem because Petar doesn't want to leave Ana pregnant in village.

== Cast ==
Actor	Character
Katarina Baban	Ana Begovac (ex-Galović)
Matko Knešaurek	Petar Begovac
Petra Kraljev	Nera Vidić
Ecija Ojdanić	Irena Begovac
Milan Štrljić	Vinko Begovac
Lana Ujević	Martina Begovac
Helena Buljan	Helena Galović (ex-Vraz)
Darko Milas	Antun Galović
Sandra Lončarić	Vesna Galović
Duško Valentić	Joza Galović
Danko Ljuština	Veljko Holcer
Robert Kurbaša	Nikola Rakitić
Dijana Vidušin	Mara Veselica
Mladen Kovačić	Domagoj Veselica
Petra Dugandžić	Kata Blažević (ex-Kozarac)
Marko Torjanac	Fedor Vidić
Jan Kerekeš	Ivan Đurđević
Draško Zidar	Đuka Balenović
Tomislav Krstanović	Slavomir
Tamara Šoletić	Žana Zlokić
Lujo Kunčević	Jan Weltrusky
Hrvoje Barišić	Zvonko Blažević
Ivan Herceg	Mladen Kozarac
Martin Lugarić	Janko Veselica
Tonka Kovačić	Lola Veselica
Ana Majhenić	Eva
Zlatko Ožbolt	Goran
Hrvoje Klobučar	Dalibor
Anita Schmidt	Sonja
Robert Ugrina	Mislav
Vladimir Posavec Tušek	Željko
Sara Moser	Ivica
