= Dar mar =

- Created by: Luka Juričić
- Screenplay by: Goran Kulenović
- Directed by: Zoran Margetić; Tomislav Rukavina; Darko Drinovac; Danijel Kušan; Robert Orhel
- Starring: Ksenija Pajić; Roko Sikavica; Milan Štrljić; Siniša Ružić; Fabijan Pavao Medvešek
- Opening theme: Petar Grašo
- Composer: Tonči Huljić
- Country of origin: Croatia
- Original language: Croatian
- No. of seasons: 2
- No. of episodes: 204

Production
- Executive producer: Boris Pavelić
- Producer: Sanja Tucman
- Running time: 50 minutes

Original release
- Network: Nova TV
- Release: 10 May – 30 December 2020

Dar mar is a Croatian telenovela produced by Nova TV. Filming began in the summer of 2020, and screening on October 5, 2020. It runs Monday through Friday at 9:30 p.m. The show stars Ksenija Pajić, Roko Sikavica, Milan Štrljić, Siniša Ružić and Fabijan Pavao Medvešek. The score was composed by Tonči Huljić. The TV series is based on an idea by Luka Juričić.

== Synopsis ==
The series follows the adventures of an unusual chief of the smallest police station and her fellow officers, Branko and Željko, and retired police officer Milo, in a quiet and picturesque place where there is no signal, which seems to be stuck in the past. Božena (Ksenija Pajić), is a policewoman with a strong hand and a big heart. Božena is used to being the one issuing orders. She tolerates authority badly, especially if that authority is Chief Jure (Enes Vejzović), who is about as stubborn as her and with whom she used to be in a relationship a long time ago. Božena has a husband, Kruna (Siniša Ružić), who is the local dentist. Dizmovo is a place where there is no crime and where the heroes of the series lead a comfortable life: they get paid, and there is no work to do. Problems arise when the Management informs them that they plan to shut down their station precisely because of lack of work, and to send them on transfer. They don't like it because everyone is connected to the place in some way. Božena has a secret from the past that keeps her from moving out, Branko (Fabijan Pavao Medvešek) has a fiancée in the village and is about to get the apartment he has been waiting for a long time, and Željko (Roko Sikavica) has fallen fatally in love. They come up with a somewhat unconventional solution: to invent a crime that they will then solve on their own and thus "create" a job for themselves. However, over time and with the involvement of other locals, the "crime" outgrows their professional abilities and the whole plan gradually begins to fall apart with a series of fun incidents and accidents. Life without signal means a story full of life. In addition to "returning" to an innocent, simpler, more romantic world, it also offers a lot of humor in a time when people are addicted to cell phones (for example, the signal can come short and completely change place; and not for the better. The signal is very rare and it can be badly caught in strange places, the locals hardly try anymore, but the newcomers will struggle with it). Although the action takes place "today", in a small town everything is just as it used to be. Calm down, tucked away and safe. No signal, but no stress. People talk looking into each other's eyes, children play in the street, Sunday smells of soup and baking, and the nights are quiet and serene.

Former Croatian president Kolinda Grabar-Kitarović makes a cameo in the series, playing herself.

== Cast ==
=== Film roles ===
Actor	Role	Seasons
Ksenija Pajić	Božena Bajić	1-2
Fabijan Pavao Medvešek	Branko Tabak	1-2
Roko Sikavica	Željko Maher	1-2
Martina Stjepanović	Suzana Brkljača Knežić	1-2
Lucia Glavich Mandarić	Milena Brkljača	1-2
Milan Štrljić	Mile Ćuk	1-2
Meliha Fakić	Bernarda Zlonoga (baba Beba)	1
Enes Vejzović	Jure Brkljača	1-2
Stjepan Perić	Priest Srećko Zlonoga	1
Draško Zidar	Dalibor Grob	1-2
Katarina Madirazza	Daliborka Dada Grob	1-2
Ankica Dobrić	Violeta Antonini Grob	1-2
Mia Mikulec	Linda Grob	1-2
Siniša Ružić	Kruno Bajić	1-2
Jasna Odorčić	Ankica Maher	1-2
Mia Anočić Valentić	Sara Mikulić Seka	1-2
Barbara Nola	Spomenka Babić	1-2
Robert Ugrina	Petar Brkljača Pero	1-2
Ana Begić Tahiri	Jana Dobrila	1-2
Marko Braić	Zoran Mikulić Zoki	1-2
Jan Kerekeš	Ljubo Dobrila	1
Ivan Simon	Velimir Trkulja	1
