= Milan Štrljić =

Croatian actor and theatre director

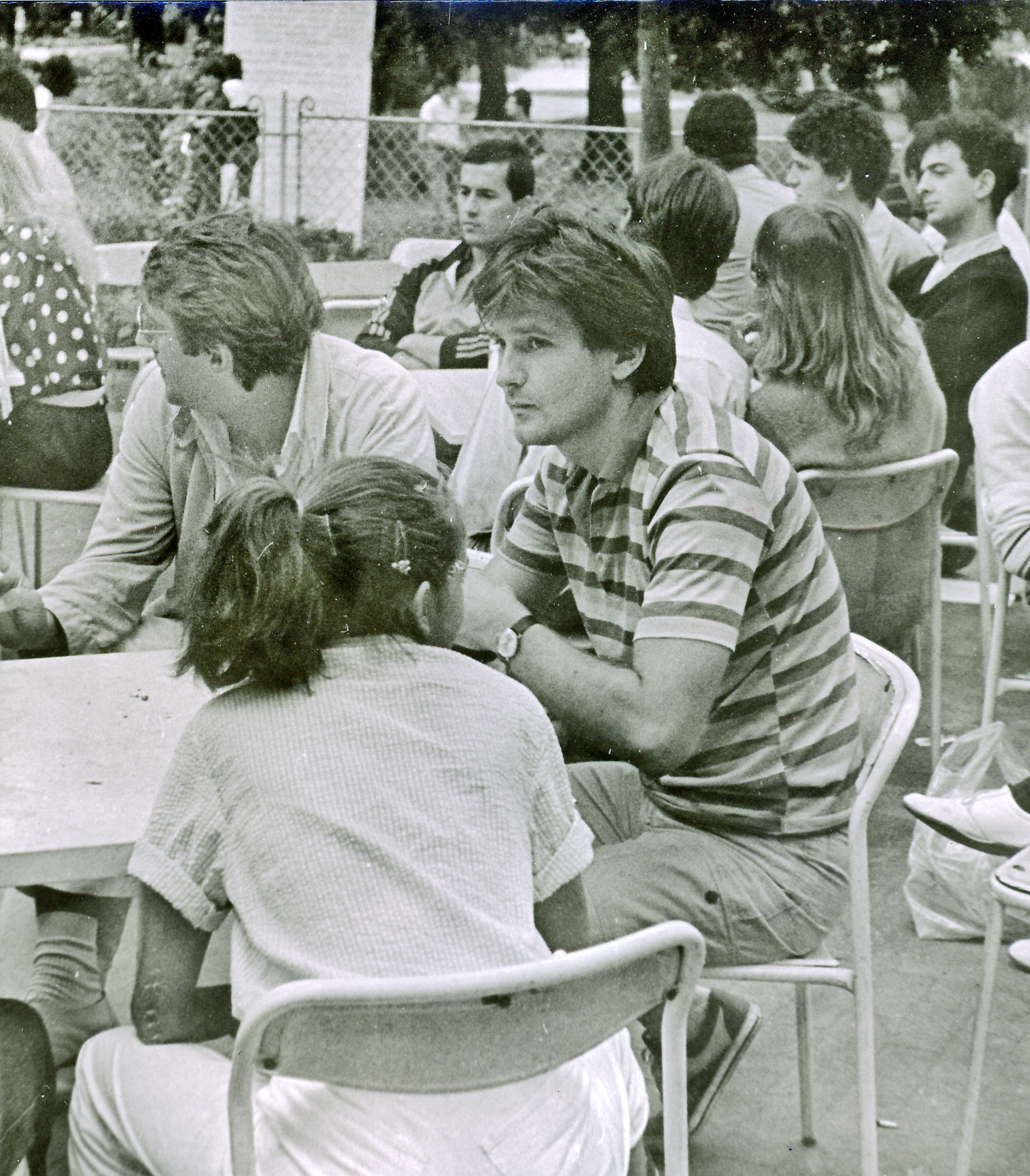
- Štrljić in Niš during the 1984 Filmski susreti festival.
- Born: 22 March 1952 (age 74); Tordinci, PR Croatia, FPR Yugoslavia
- Education: Faculty of Dramatic Arts
- Alma mater: University of Arts in Belgrade
- Occupation: Actor
- Years active: 1972–present
- Spouse(s): Slavica Štrljić (divorced); Daša Štrljić
- Children: 2

Milan Štrljić (born 22 March 1952) is a Croatian actor and theatre director. He appeared in more than ninety films since 1972.

== Personal life ==
He is married to Daša Štrljić, and together they have one child, Fran.

He was previously married to Slavica Štrljić, with whom he has a daughter, Iva, who is also an actress.

== Selected filmography ==
=== Film roles ===
Year	Title	Role	Notes
2011	Josef		
2010	Cirkus Columbia		
2004	Accidental Co-Traveller		
2003	The Doctor of Craziness		
2002	Fine Dead Girls		
1987–1990	Hajde da se volimo		
1987	Kraljeva završnica		
1986	Dancing in Water		
1984	Fever of Love		
1984	Balkan Spy		
1978	Occupation in 26 Pictures		
1977	Fliers of the Open Skies		

=== Television roles ===
Year	Title	Role	Notes
2022–2024	Kumovi	Stipan Macan	423 episodes
2020–2021	Dar mar	Mile Ćuk	204 episodes
2018–2019	Na granici	Andrija Masle	236 episodes
2016–2017	Zlatni dvori	Vinko Begovac	147 episodes
2014–2016	Kud puklo da puklo	Milan "Mile" Gavran	350 episodes
2012–2013	Ruža vjetrova	Mirko Rukavina	8 episodes
2011–2012	Larin izbor	Vuksan Petrović	50 episodes
2011–2012	Loza	Zvonimir Gamulin	16 episodes
1990–1991	Bolji život	Dejan Milićević	17 episodes
1987–1988	Vuk Karadžić	Dimitrije Davidović	5 episodes
