= Janko Popović Volarić =

Croatian film and television actor

- Born: 14 March 1980 (age 46); Zagreb, SR Croatia, SFR Yugoslavia
- Other name: Jane
- Occupation: Actor
- Years active: 2006–present
- Spouse: Jelena Veljača (m. 2009; div. 2012)
- Children: 2

Janko Popović Volarić (born 14 March 1980) is a Croatian actor.

== Filmography ==
=== TV series ===
Film
Year	Title	Role	Notes
2006	Balkan Inc.	Marko Prilika (young)	Guest star
2006–2007	Obični ljudi	Pavle Dragan	Main cast
2007	Kazalište u kući	Maniac	Guest star
2007–2008	Ponos Ratkajevih	Krsto pl. Ratkaj	Protagonist
2008–2009	Sve će biti dobro	Tomislav Šimunić	Antagonist
2009–2011	Najbolje godine	Ranko Hajduk	Protagonist
2011–2012	Loza	Krešo	Guest star
2012	Nedjeljom ujutro, subotom navečer	Irena's boyfriend	Guest star
2012–2013	Larin izbor	Lucijan Krstulović	Antagonist
2013	Počivali u miru	Predrag Bogojević	Guest star
2013	Ples sa zvijezdama	Himself	Contestant
2014–2016	Kud puklo da puklo	Krešo Kolarić	Main cast
2018	Čista ljubav	Tomo Vitez	Main cast

=== Films ===
Film
Year	Title	Role
2006	U tišini	Danijel
2007	Noćna vožnja	Detective
2010	Mother of Asphalt	Janko
2010	Duga	Father (voice)
2013	Vis-à-vis	Main Actor
2013	Kratki spojevi	Naser
2016	Goran	Niko
2018	Comic Sans	Alan
2023	Good Times, Bad Times	
