= Ecija Ojdanić =

Croatian actress

- Born: 26 June 1974 (age 51); Drniš, SR Croatia, SFR Yugoslavia
- Occupation: Actress
- Years active: 1995–present
- Known for: Larin izbor, Hitac
- Spouses: Ante Viljac (m. 2003; div. 2007) Robert Orhel (m. 2009)
- Children: Cvita Viljac; Jakov Orhel

Ecija Ojdanić (born 26 June 1974) is a Croatian theatre, film and television actress.

== Filmography ==
=== Television roles ===
Film
Year	Title	Role	Notes
2022–2024	Kumovi	Mirjana Bogdan	
2021	Dar mar	Ivanka Mikulić	
2020–present	Mrkomir Prvi	Anuša	Main role
2019–2020	Drugo ime ljubavi	Nada Prpić	
2016–2017	Zlatni dvori	Irena Begovac	
2014–2016	Kud puklo da puklo	Barbara Murgić	
2011–2013	Larin izbor	Antonela "Nela" Zlatar	
2008–2010	Mamutica	Jelena Kovačević	
2008–2009	Sve će biti dobro	Karla Radić	
2008	Zauvijek susjedi	Kristina	1 episode
2007	Operacija Kajman	Višnja	
2007	Odmori se, zaslužio si	Beti	
2006–2007	Kazalište u kući	Cica Maglić	
2006	Bibin svijet	Ilona Radić	1 episode
2006	Naša mala klinika	cirurg inspector	1 episode
2006	Bumerang	Olga	
2004	Zlatni vrč	Duda	
2002	Novo doba	Renči	
2001–2002	Naši i vaši	Lucija "Luce"	

=== Movie roles ===
Film
Year	Title	Role	Notes
2013	Hitac	Anita	
2011	Lea i Darija - Dječje carstvo	a woman	
2008	Iza stakla		
2008	Tri priče o nespavanju		
2007	Pravo čudo	Cvita	
2006	Libertas	vila #2	
2005	I galebovi su se smijali		
2004	Oprosti za kung fu	rodilja #2	
2002	Ne dao Bog većeg zla	a woman	
2001	Ante se vraća kući	TV-host	
2001	Starci	Zelga	
2000	Je li jasno, prijatelju?		
2000	Život sa žoharima	police officer	
1999	Da mi je biti morski pas	Miki	
1998	Tri muškarca Melite Žganjer		1 episode
1997	Territorio Comanche	Jasmina	
1997	Rusko meso		
1995	Isprani		
