= Momčilo Otašević =

Montenegrin actor (born 1990)

- Момчило Оташевић
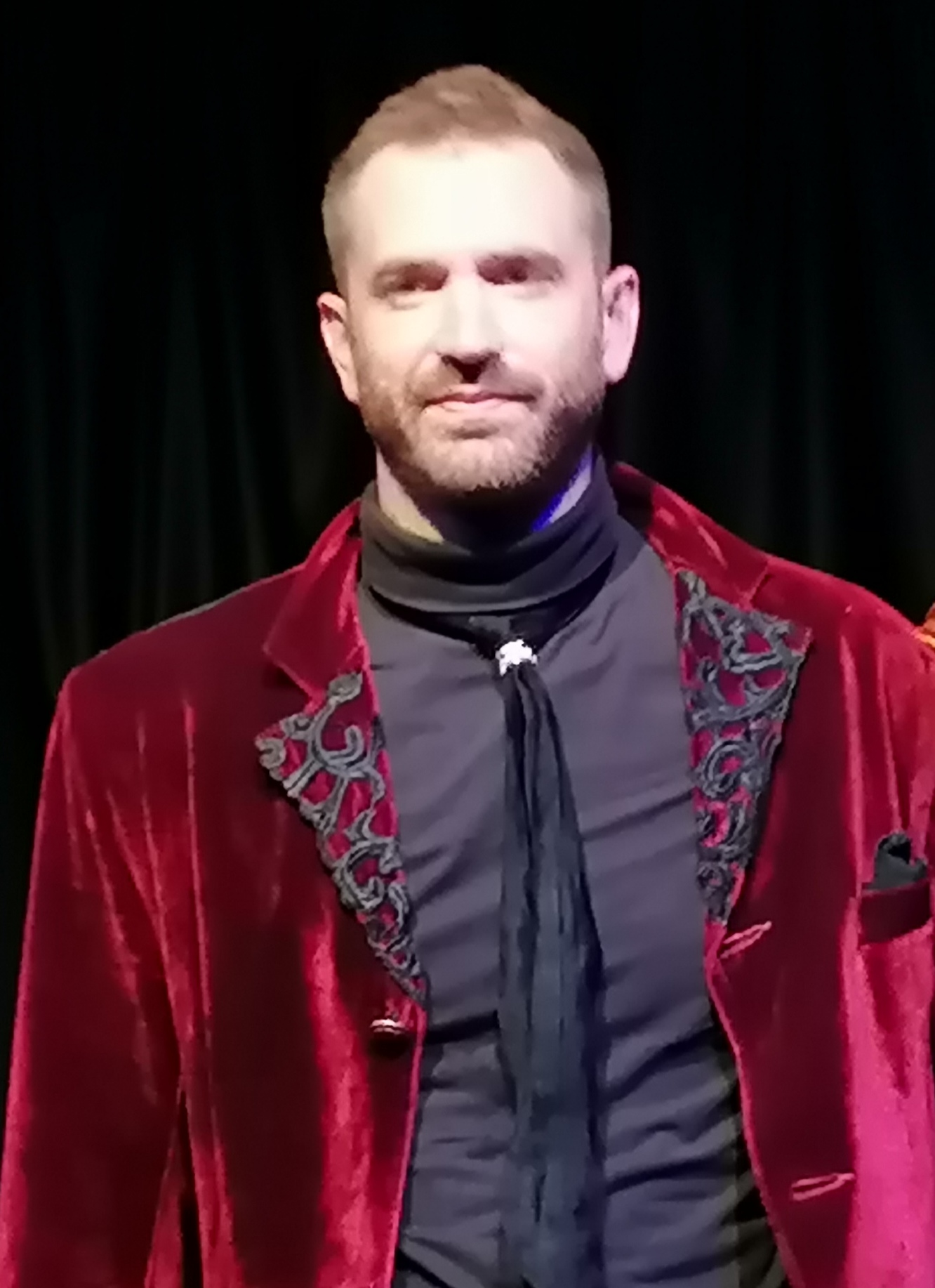
- Born: 20 February 1990 (age 36); Cetinje, SR Montenegro, SFR Yugoslavia
- Citizenship: Montenegro; Croatia
- Occupation: Actor
- Years active: 2010–present
- Height: 6 ft 2.5 in (189 cm)
- Spouse: Jelena Perčin (m. 2018; div. 2023)
- Children: 2

Momčilo Otašević (Montenegrin Cyrillic: Момчило Оташевић; born 20 February 1990) is a Montenegrin actor.

His native language is Montenegrin, while he is fluent in English and Italian and has basic knowledge of Russian.

== Filmography ==
=== Television roles ===
Film
Year	Title	Role	Notes
2013	Ravna Gora	Sergeant	Guest star
2012–2014	Budva na pjenu od mora	Luka Radmilović	Protagonist
2013–2014	Zora dubrovačka	Filip Marković	Co-Protagonist
2014–2016	Kud puklo da puklo	Damir Gavran	Protagonist
2017–2018	Čista ljubav	Ranko Novak	Main Antagonist
2018–2019	Na granici	Krešo Butigan	Co-Protagonist
2019–2020	Drugo ime ljubavi	Saša Krpan	Protagonist
2021	Dar mar	Nino Zečić	Guest star
2022–present	Kumovi	Janko Gotovac	Protagonist
2024–2026	U dobru i zlu	Zvonimir Crnogorac	Antagonist

=== Movie roles ===
Film
Year	Title	Role	Notes
2010	Malo para, puno želja	Batko	TV film
2011	Mali ljubavni bog	Father	
2012	As pik	/	
2012	Led	Milivoje	
2013	Jagode	Young Man	
2014	The Kids from the Marx and Engels Street	/	
