= Najbolje godine =

- Genre: Drama
- Directed by: Mladen Dizdar; Robert Orhel; Goran Rukavina; Kristijan Milić
- Starring: See Cast and characters
- Theme music composer: Miroslav Škoro
- Opening theme: Najbolje Godine, Miroslav Škoro
- Country of origin: Croatia
- Original language: Croatian
- No. of seasons: 2
- No. of episodes: 318

Production
- Running time: 40 minutes
- Production companies: Nova TV; Media Pro

Original release
- Network: Nova TV (Croatia); FTV / RTRS (Bosnia and Herzegovina); POP TV (Slovenia); FTV / TV B92 (Serbia)
- Release: 14 September 2009 – 3 June 2011

Najbolje godine (English: The Best Years) is a Croatian drama television series that aired for two seasons on Nova TV, from 14 September 2009 to 3 June 2011. The series follows everyday conflicts between inhabitants of Dragošje, a small fictional village in Slavonia.

== Premise ==
Lorena Levaj (Katarina Radivojević), a modern city girl, is sent to the countryside after a sequence of unforeseen and tragic events. The sale of the family estate she inherited from her late mother in her will marks the start of her journey to Dragošje, a small village in Slavonia. She initially planned to sell the house, but she ends up staying in the village.

== Series overview ==
Season	Episodes	Originally released	
Season	Episodes	First released	Last released
1	152	14 September 2009	3 June 2010
2	166	6 September 2010	3 June 2011

== Cast and characters ==
† indicates character dies during the series

Actor	Character	Duration
Janko Popović Volarić	Ranko Hajduk	2009–2011
Katarina Radivojević	Lorena Levaj	2009–2011
Karlo Ferenčak	Marko Lovrić	2009–2011
Svjetlana Magdić	Zvjezdana "Zveki" Rakan	2009–2011
Amar Bukvić	Tomo Hajduk	2009–2011
Asja Jovanović	Danica Hajduk-Lehner	2009–2011
Velimir Čokljat	Đuka Lotar	2009–2011
Luka Juričić	Young Đuka Lotar	2011 (1 episode)
Jasna Odorčić	Zlata Žunić	2009–2011
Robert Jozinović	Dr. Dražen Ricijaš	2009–2011
Duško Valentić	Don. Andrija Perkić	2009–2011
Mirta Zečević	Saška Jaklinac	2009–2011
Livia Drinovac	Ema Jaklinac	2009–2011
Marija Borić	Zrinka Lotar	2009–2011
Hrvoje Horvat	Sebastijan Lovrić	2009–2011
Petra Cicvarić	Korana Lotar	2009–2011
Žarko Potočnjak	Božo Hajduk	2009–2011
Leona Paraminski	Majda Botica	2009; guest in 2010
Ivana Bolanča	Jana Matišić	2009–2010
Barbara Rocco	Anka Lovrić	2009–2010
Biserka Ipša	Ruža Hajduk (u komi)	2009–2010
Mladen Čutura	Petar Lovrić	2009–2010
Mateja Kruhak	Mira Matišić	2009–2010
Stjepan Perić	Filip	2009–2010
Janko Rakoš	Damir Hajduk	2009–2010; guest in 2011
Ksenija Pajić	Suzana Gajs	2010–2011
Zrinka Kolak Fabijan	Spomenka Gajs	2010; guest in 2011
Mia Dejanović	Lena Gajs	2010–2011
Maša Dejanović	Tena Gajs	2010–2011
Ljubomir Kerekeš	Ante Lalić "Lale"	2010–2011
Ivica Pucar	Kruno Lalić	2010
Ljubica Jović	Jasenka Lovrić "Beba"	2010
Mira Furlan	Violeta	2010
Sonja Kovač	Dorotea	2010
Enes Vejzović	Antun "Tuna" Elezović	2010–2011
Iskra Jirsak	Marta Elezović	2010–2011
Tomislav Martić	Maks †	2010–2011
Lena Politeo	Katarina "Kata" Jurić †	2010–2011
Nikolina Pišek	Lucija Elezović	2010–2011
Jelena Perčin	Dunja Dizdar-Lehner	2010–2011
Ivan Herceg	Dino Popović	2010–2011
Ivan Pašalić	Goran "Gogo" Dizdar	2010–2011
Vesna Tominac Matačić	Dr. Melita Jurić	2011
Nebojša Borojević	Mišo Sekulić	2011
Antonio Franić	Don. Gabrijel Kos	2011

== Production and broadcast ==
The filming of the first season began in July 2009. Due to its very high ratings, filming continued for a second season. The series had a main cast of 20 actors. The story takes place in a fictional village called Dragošje, located in the Slavonia region of Croatia. Sixty percent of filming was exterior, in Eko Selo, Žumberak, Croatia. Nova TV also constructed a village set near the town of Samobor.

The main directors of the series were Mladen Dizdar, Robert Orhel, Goran Rukavina and Kristijan Milić. The series' creative producer was Milivoj Puhlovski.

The series aired from Mondays to Thursdays in the prime time slot (from 8 to 9 pm). It also aired in Bosnia and Hercegovina on Program Plus (shared channel by Kanal ATV and NTV HAYAT), in Slovenia on POP TV, and in Serbia on TV B92.
