= Vesna Tominac Matačić =

Croatian actress (born 1968)

- Born: Vesna Tominac; 25 October 1968 (age 57); Vinkovci, SR Croatia, SFR Yugoslavia
- Education: Academy of Dramatic Art, University of Zagreb
- Occupation: Actress
- Years active: 1995–present

Vesna Tominac Matačić (born 25 October 1968) is a Croatian actress.

== Filmography ==
=== Television roles ===
Film
Year	Title	Role	Notes
2004	Zabranjena ljubav	Barbara Sabljak	Guest star
2005-2008	Zabranjena ljubav	Karolina Novak	Main cast
2008	Hitna 94	Dr. Anita Matić	Main cast
2010	Bibin svijet	Doctor	Guest star
2011	Dnevnik plavuše	Morana's Mother	Guest star
2011	Najbolje godine	Dr. Melita Lalić	Main cast
2014-2016	Kud puklo da puklo	Višnja Došen	Main cast

=== Movie roles ===
Film
Year	Title	Role	Notes
1995	Posebna vožnja	Marijana	TV film
1996	La frontiera	Melania	
2003	Konjanik	Mother	
2006	Kravata	Grizzly's Wife	
2007	Zagorka	Sister Bernarda	
2007	Stvar ukusa	Woman at the office	
2013	Djeca jeseni	Vlasta Mamula	
2013	Most na kraju svijeta	Ljilja	
