= Željko Pervan =

Croatian comedian (born 1962)

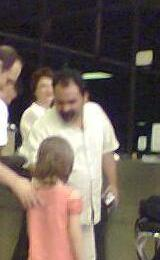
- Željko Pervan
- Born: 7 August 1962 (age 63); Zagreb, PR Croatia, Yugoslavia
- Occupation: Actor
- Years active: 1986 present

Željko Pervan (born 7 August 1962) is a Croatian comedian. He is best known as the creator and actor in the comedy show Evening School (Croatian: Večernja Škola)

== Life and career ==
Pervan was born in Zagreb, and started his career in Radio 101 in 1985. Together with Vinko Grubišić, Goran Pirš, Zlatan Zuhrić and Davor Pocrnić, he founded the comedy group Naughty Children (Croatian: Zločesta djeca) which was notorious for its dark uncensored humour. In 1995 Pervan, together with Mladen Horvat, Zlatan Zuhrić, Đuro Utješanović and Ahmed Al Rahim, started Večernja škola, a live comedy television show.

== Sources ==
- Robert Bajruši (25 April 2005). "Željko Pervan - Vrhunci televizijske karijere zagrebačkog komičara" [Željko Pervan - Pinnacles of television career of Zagreb comedian] (in Croatian). Nacional (weekly). Archived from the original on 31 May 2012.
