= Sanja Vejnović =

Croatian actress

- Born: 8 August 1961 (age 64); Zagreb, PR Croatia, FPR Yugoslavia
- Occupation: Actress
- Years active: 1978–present
- Spouse: Goran Mećava (m. 1984; div. 2015)
- Children: 2

Sanja Vejnović (born 8 August 1961) is a Croatian film and television actress.

== Career ==
Vejnović started her film career in 1978, with Branko Ivanda film Court Martial. She came under international spotlight in Vatroslav Mimica's 1981 epic The Falcon where she played Anđa, the wife of the Serbian hero Strahinja Banović. She starred in Croatian telenovela Lara's Choice, portraying protagonist's mother Mija (2011–13).

== Personal life ==
Vejnović married filmographer Goran Mećava in 1984, and the couple have one son and one daughter.

== Selected filmography ==
- Court Martial (1978)
- That's the Way the Cookie Crumbles (1979)
- High Voltage (1981)
- The Falcon (1981)
- The Elusive Summer of '68 (1984)
- The Three Men of Melita Žganjer (1998)
- 100 Minutes of Glory (2004)
- Blurs (2011)
- With Mum (2013)
