= Miodrag Krivokapić (actor) =

Serbian actor

- Миодраг Кривокапић
- Born: 22 April 1949 (age 76); Peć, PR Serbia, FPR Yugoslavia
- Education: Academy of Dramatic Art
- Alma mater: University of Zagreb
- Occupation: Actor
- Years active: 1975–present

Miodrag Krivokapić (Serbian Cyrillic: Миодраг Кривокапић, pronounced [mîodraɡ kriʋokapitɕ]; born 22 April 1949) is a Serbian actor. He completed the Zagreb Academy of Dramatic Art in 1975. He remained in Zagreb after graduation, becoming a member of the ensemble of the Gavella Drama Theatre, later moving to the Croatian National Theatre in Zagreb, where he remained until 1986. Upon the breakup of Yugoslavia he left Zagreb, and in 2005 joined the ensemble of the National Theatre in Belgrade. He has appeared in numerous theatre, film, and television productions in Yugoslavia and its successor states.

== Selected filmography ==
=== Film ===
Year	Title	Role	Notes
1981	The Fall of Italy	Andro	
1988	My Uncle's Legacy	Stjepan Kujundzic, stric	
1990	Stela	Mijo Loncar	
1991	Virdžina	Timotije	
2005	Bal-Can-Can	Veselin Kabadajic	
2015	Enklava	Otac Draza	
