= Zora dubrovačka =

Croatian telenovela

- Genre: Telenovela; Romance; Drama
- Created by: Jelena Veljača (writer)
- Starring: Barbara Bilić; Boris Ler; Vanessa Radman; Krunoslav Šarić; Alen Liverić; Vinko Kraljević
- Country of origin: Croatia
- Original language: Croatian

Production
- Production location: Dubrovnik, Croatia
- Production company: Nova TV

Original release
- Network: Nova TV
- Release: 15 September 2013 – 1 June 2014

Zora dubrovačka (Dawn of Dubrovnik) is a Croatian telenovela produced by Nova TV. It is an original story, produced in 2013, and starring Barbara Bilić, Boris Ler and Vanessa Radman.

The series, set during the 1991–92 Siege of Dubrovnik, was immediately met with negative reception in the city itself. Viewers called Zora dubrovačka a "disgraceful catastrophe", claiming that it inaccurately portrays Dubrovnik, its people and the local accent.

== Cast ==
| Actor | Character |
|---|---|
| Barbara Bilić | Judita Knego |
| Boris Ler | Maro Kesovija |
| Vanessa Radman | Maris Menčetić Knego |
| Alen Liverić | Dživo Knego |
| Dragan Despot | Šiško Kesovija |
| Ana Kvrgić | Dijana Kesovija |
| Jelena Perčin | Deša Šimunović |
| Ivana Horvat | Jana Leko |
| Jolanda Tudor | Magdalena Leko |
| Amar Bukvić | Boris Pavela |
| Mirna Medaković | Anica Prkačin |
| Ivo Gregurević | Tonko Šimunović |
| Stefan Kapicic | Roko Sorgo |
| Frane Perišin | Lovro Kordić |
| Robert Jozinović | Alex Vojković |
| Jasmin Mekić | Dino |
| Momčilo Otašević | Filip Marković |
| Mladen Vulić | Miho |
