= List of Ples sa zvijezdama episodes =

Ples sa zvijezdama (Croatian for 'Dancing with the Stars') is a Croatian dance competition reality television series based on Strictly Come Dancing. The series premiered on 2 December 2006 on HRT 1. Its original run on HRT consisted of eight seasons and eight episodes per season, which aired until 21 December 2013, after which the network has put the series on a hiatus.

During HRT's hiatus, Ples sa zvijezdama moved to Nova TV, which aired three seasons from 17 March 2019 to 21 May 2023. Nova TV produced 12 episodes per season.

In September 2026, HRT announced the continuation of the network's original run of the series. The ninth season premiered on 31 October 2026.

== HRT seasons ==
=== Series overview ===
Season	Episodes	Originally released		Winners
Season	Episodes	First released	Last released	Winners
1	8	2 December 2006	20 January 2007	Zrinka Cvitešić & Nicolas Quesnoit
2	8	3 November 2007	22 December 2007	Luka Nižetić & Mirjana Žutić
3	8	25 October 2008	20 December 2008	Mario Valentić & Ana Herceg
4	8	31 October 2009	19 December 2009	Franka Batelić & Ištvan Varga
5	8	30 October 2010	18 December 2010	Nera Stipičević & Damir Horvatinčić
6	8	29 October 2011	17 December 2011	Marko Tolja & Ana Herceg
7	8	3 November 2012	22 December 2012	Barbara Radulović & Robert Schubert
8	8	2 November 2013	21 December 2013	Mislav Čavajda & Petra Jeričević
9	8	31 October 2026	19 December 2026	TBA

=== Season 1 (2006–07) ===
No. overall	No. in season	Title	Original release date
1	1	"Episode 1"	2 December 2006
2	2	"Episode 2"	9 December 2006
3	3	"Episode 3"	16 December 2006
4	4	"Episode 4"	23 December 2006
5	5	"Episode 5"	30 December 2006
6	6	"Episode 6"	6 January 2007
7	7	"Episode 7"	13 January 2007
8	8	"Episode 8"	20 January 2007

=== Season 2 (2007) ===
No. overall	No. in season	Title	Original release date
9	1	"Episode 1"	3 November 2007
10	2	"Episode 2"	10 November 2007
11	3	"Episode 3"	17 November 2007
12	4	"Episode 4"	24 November 2007
13	5	"Episode 5"	1 December 2007
14	6	"Episode 6"	8 December 2007
15	7	"Episode 7"	15 December 2007
16	8	"Episode 8"	22 December 2007

=== Season 3 (2008) ===
No. overall	No. in season	Title	Original release date
17	1	"Episode 1"	25 October 2008
18	2	"Episode 2"	8 November 2008
19	3	"Episode 3"	15 November 2008
20	4	"Episode 4"	22 November 2008
21	5	"Episode 5"	29 November 2008
22	6	"Episode 6"	6 December 2008
23	7	"Episode 7"	13 December 2008
24	8	"Episode 8"	20 December 2008

=== Season 4 (2009) ===
No. overall	No. in season	Title	Original release date
25	1	"Episode 1"	31 October 2009
26	2	"Episode 2"	7 November 2009
27	3	"Episode 3"	14 November 2009
28	4	"Episode 4"	21 November 2009
29	5	"Episode 5"	28 November 2009
30	6	"Episode 6"	5 December 2009
31	7	"Episode 7"	12 December 2009
32	8	"Episode 8"	19 December 2009

=== Season 5 (2010) ===
No. overall	No. in season	Title	Original release date
33	1	"Episode 1"	30 October 2010
34	2	"Episode 2"	6 November 2010
35	3	"Episode 3"	13 November 2010
36	4	"Episode 4"	20 November 2010
37	5	"Episode 5"	27 November 2010
38	6	"Episode 6"	4 December 2010
39	7	"Episode 7"	11 December 2010
40	8	"Episode 8"	18 December 2010

=== Season 6 (2011) ===
No. overall	No. in season	Title	Original release date
41	1	"Episode 1"	29 October 2011
42	2	"Episode 2"	5 November 2011
43	3	"Episode 3"	12 November 2011
44	4	"Episode 4"	19 November 2011
45	5	"Episode 5"	26 November 2011
46	6	"Episode 6"	3 December 2011
47	7	"Episode 7"	10 December 2011
48	8	"Episode 8"	17 December 2011

=== Season 7 (2012) ===
No. overall	No. in season	Title	Original release date
49	1	"Episode 1"	3 November 2012
50	2	"Episode 2"	10 November 2012
51	3	"Episode 3"	17 November 2012
52	4	"Episode 4"	24 November 2012
53	5	"Episode 5"	1 December 2012
54	6	"Episode 6"	8 December 2012
55	7	"Episode 7"	15 December 2012
56	8	"Episode 8"	22 December 2012

=== Season 8 (2013) ===
No. overall	No. in season	Title	Original release date
57	1	"Episode 1"	2 November 2013
58	2	"Episode 2"	9 November 2013
59	3	"Episode 3"	16 November 2013
60	4	"Episode 4"	23 November 2013
61	5	"Episode 5"	30 November 2013
62	6	"Episode 6"	7 December 2013
63	7	"Episode 7"	14 December 2013
64	8	"Episode 8"	21 December 2013

=== Season 9 (2026) ===
No. overall	No. in season	Title	Original release date
65	1	"Episode 1"	31 October 2026
66	2	"Episode 2"	7 November 2026
67	3	"Episode 3"	14 November 2026
68	4	"Episode 4"	21 November 2026
69	5	"Episode 5"	28 November 2026
70	6	"Episode 6"	5 December 2026
71	7	"Episode 7"	12 December 2026
72	8	"Episode 8"	19 December 2026

== Nova TV seasons ==
=== Series overview ===
Season	Episodes	Originally released		Winners
Season	Episodes	First released	Last released	Winners
1	12	17 March 2019	2 June 2019	Slavko Sobin & Gabriela Pilić
2	12	6 March 2022	29 May 2022	Pedro Soltz & Valentina Walme
3	12	5 March 2023	21 May 2023	Marco Cuccurin & Paula Tonković

=== Season 1 (2019) ===
No. overall	No. in season	Title	Original release date
1	1	"Episode 1"	17 March 2019
2	2	"Episode 2"	24 March 2019
3	3	"Episode 3"	31 March 2019
4	4	"Episode 4"	7 April 2019
5	5	"Episode 5"	14 April 2019
6	6	"Episode 6"	21 April 2019
7	7	"Episode 7"	28 April 2019
8	8	"Episode 8"	5 May 2019
9	9	"Episode 9"	12 May 2019
10	10	"Episode 10"	19 May 2019
11	11	"Episode 11"	26 May 2019
12	12	"Episode 12"	2 June 2019

=== Season 2 (2022) ===
No. overall	No. in season	Title	Original release date
13	1	"Episode 1"	6 March 2022
14	2	"Episode 2"	13 March 2022
15	3	"Episode 3"	20 March 2022
16	4	"Episode 4"	3 April 2022
17	5	"Episode 5"	10 April 2022
18	6	"Episode 6"	17 April 2022
19	7	"Episode 7"	24 April 2022
20	8	"Episode 8"	1 May 2022
21	9	"Episode 9"	8 May 2022
22	10	"Episode 10"	15 May 2022
23	11	"Episode 11"	22 May 2022
24	12	"Episode 12"	29 May 2022

=== Season 3 (2023) ===
No. overall	No. in season	Title	Original release date
25	1	"Episode 1"	5 March 2023
26	2	"Episode 2"	12 March 2023
27	3	"Episode 3"	19 March 2023
28	4	"Episode 4"	26 March 2023
29	5	"Episode 5"	2 April 2023
30	6	"Episode 6"	9 April 2023
31	7	"Episode 7"	16 April 2023
32	8	"Episode 8"	23 April 2023
33	9	"Episode 9"	30 April 2023
34	10	"Episode 10"	7 May 2023
35	11	"Episode 11"	14 May 2023
36	12	"Episode 12"	21 May 2023
