= Volim Hrvatsku =

- The title card for the series
- Genre: Game show
- Based on: I Love My Country by John de Mol Jr.
- Presented by: Mirko Fodor
- Country of origin: Croatia
- Original language: Croatian
- No. of seasons: 12
- No. of episodes: 180 (list of episodes)

Production
- Camera setup: Multi-camera

Original release
- Network: HRT 1
- Release: 23 September 2012 – 1 March 2026

Volim Hrvatsku (English: I Love Croatia) is a Croatian game show television series based on the Dutch format of I Love My Country. The series sees two teams of celebrities, currently led by Goran Navojec and Dušan Bućan, playing various games that test their knowledge about Croatia. It is hosted by Mirko Fodor.

Volim Hrvatsku debuted on 23 September 2012 on HRT 1. The series usually airs on Sundays afternoons; so far, twelve seasons have been broadcast.

== Format ==
Each episode features six celebrity guests (such as singers, actors or sports people and television personalities) divided into two teams of three; each team is led by a team captain. The teams take part in various games that test their knowledge of various Croatia-related topics, such as Croatian popular culture, music, history, sports, literature, movies, television or notable people.

=== Team captains ===
Team captains on Volim Hrvatsku
Team captain	Season											
Team captain	1	2	3	4	5	6	7	8	9	10	11	12
Rene Bitorajac	Main											
Goran Navojec	Main			Main								
Frano Ridjan	Guest		Main		Guest							
Martina Validžić			Main		Guest			Guest				
Bojan Navojec				Main								
Dušan Bućan	Guest		Guest							Main		

== Series overview ==
Season	Episodes	Originally released	
Season	Episodes	First released	Last released
1	15	23 September 2012	30 December 2012
2	15	22 September 2013	29 December 2013
3	15	19 October 2014	25 January 2015
4	15	18 September 2016	25 December 2016
5	15	24 September 2017	31 December 2017
6	15	23 September 2018	30 December 2018
7	15	22 September 2019	29 December 2019
8	15	27 September 2020	3 January 2021
9	15	26 September 2021	2 January 2022
10	15	25 September 2022	1 January 2023
11	15	24 September 2023	24 March 2024
12	15	21 September 2025	1 March 2026

=== Season 1 (2012) ===
List of season 1 episodes
No. overall	No. in season	Guests	Original release date
1	1	Franka Batelić, Indira Levak, Tamara Loos, Vedran Mikota, Jelena Perčin and Mario Petreković	23 September 2012
2	2	Dušan Bućan, Zrinka Cvitešić, Ankica Dobrić, Jan Kerekeš, Mirna Medaković and Ranko Zidarić	30 September 2012
3	3	Ana Begić, Natko Zrnčić-Dim, Barbara Kolar, Zlata Mück Sušec, Žarko Radić and Ivan Vukusić	7 October 2012
4	4	Frano Domitrović, Sandra Križanec, Ivan Planinić, Dubravko Šimenc, Đani Stipeničev and Ana Vilenica	14 October 2012
5	5	Sandra Bagarić, Lana Banely, Luka Bulić, Lorena Nosić, Marko Tolja and Zoran Vakula	21 October 2012
6	6	Marija Borić, Davor Dretar Drele, Bojan Jambrošić, Adam Končić, Barbara Radulović and Zlatan Zuhrić-Zuhra	28 October 2012
7	7	Duško Čurlić, Tihana Devčić, Zijad Gračić, Gordan Kozulj, Luka Nižetić and Mirjana Zutić	4 November 2012
8	8	Dino Jelušić, Nela Kočiš, Emilija Kokić, Dunja Mutavelić, Nevena Randeli and Luka Vidović	11 November 2012
9	9	Jura Blažević, Mario Kovač, Mirjana Marujec, Antonija Šola, Iva Šuletić and Karmela Vukov-Colić	18 November 2012
10	10	Natali Dizdar, Mila Elegović, Aleksandar Kostadinov, Frano Ridjan, Srđana Šimunović and Maja Šuput	25 November 2012
11	11	Ivana Horvat, Slavica Knežević, Monika Lelas, Mara Modrić, Pamela Ramljak and Miroslav Škoro	2 December 2012
12	12	Dado Ćosić, Željka Fattorini, Ivana Kindl, Antonela Malis, Zoran Mišić and Ivana Popović	9 December 2012
13	13	Meltia Hrengek, Hrvoje Kečkeš, Lana Klingor, Lea Mijatović, Kristijan Rahimovski and Sonja Šarunić	16 December 2012
14	14	Anamarija Asanović, Darko Janeš, Neda Paramac, Uršula Tolj, Filip Ude and Ivica Zadro	23 December 2012
15	15	Jasna Bilušić, Tarik Filipović, Joško Čagalj Jole, Dalibor Matanić, Ištvan Varga and Vanda Winter	30 December 2012

=== Season 2 (2013) ===
List of season 2 episodes
No. overall	No. in season	Guests	Original release date
16	1	Larisa Lipovac, Mario Mirković, Tamara Curić, Boris Mirković, Ana Zaninović and Lucija Zaninović	22 September 2013
17	2	Tomislav Bralić, Ecija Ojdanić, Ivica Pucar, Ivan Šarić, Mihovil španja and Ljubo Zečević	29 September 2013
18	3	Robert Ferlin, Jerko Marić, Mario Možnik, Boris Novković, Doris Pinčić and Mirta Šurjak	6 October 2013
19	4	Amar Bukvić, Ella Dvornik, Matea Elezović, Zdenka Kovačiček, Robert Kurbaša and Jasna Palić-Picukarić	13 October 2013
20	5	Daria Knez, Mirna Maras, David Šain, Martin Sinković, Danijela Trbović and Kristijan Ugrina	20 October 2013
21	6	Mirna Dvorščak, Šime Fantela, Hana Hegedušić, Dražen Turina, Kim Verson and Jasna Zlokić	27 October 2013
22	7	Sandra Bosnar, Ronald Braus, Oliver Dragojević, Petra Kurtela, Hrvoje Rupčić and Petra Težak	3 November 2013
23	8	Natalija Đorđević, Ana Gruica, Mihovil Horvat, Goran Kulenović, Zdravko Šljivac, Luka Stepančić	10 November 2013
24	9	Sandi Cenov, Dunja Fajdić, Almira Osmanović, Amanda Prenkaj, Ana Rucner and Mario Rucner	17 November 2013
25	10	Snježana Abramović, Aljoša Čepl, Ivanka Mazurkijević, Andrea Mladinić, Martina Tomčić and Mario Valentić	25 November 2013
26	11	Zorica Kondža, Marinko Leš, Ivana Radovniković, Tara Rosandić and Duško Valentić	1 December 2013
27	12	Ivana Banfić, Mia Biondić, Saša Buneta, Duško Modrinić, Ivo Perkušić and Antonija Pintarić	8 December 2013
28	13	Jelena Bosančić, Giuliano, Lana Gojak, Josipa Lisac, Maja Vučić and Alka Vuica	15 December 2013
29	14	Katarina Baban, Ivana Soldo Čabraja, Sanja Doležal, Saša Lozar, Marijana Mikulić and Massimo Savić	22 December 2013
30	15	Ante Galić, Vlado Kalember, Ivana Kovač, Nikša Kušelj, Danijela Pintarić, Marko Škugor	29 December 2013

=== Season 3 (2014–15) ===
Daniela Trbović replaced Mirko Fodor as the host for the third season. Martina Validžić and Frano Ridjan debuted as team captains.

List of season 3 episodes
No. overall	No. in season	Guests	Original release date
31	1	Ivana Bilen, Vladimir Kočiš, Emilija Kokić, Kristina Krepela, Lorna Kunčić and Mara Modrić	19 October 2014
32	2	Kristijan Beluhan, Denis Dumančić, Tina Mihelić, Zoran Mišić, Kristijan Rahimovski and Sonja Sarunić	26 October 2014
33	3	Ankica Dobrić, Alan Hržica, Ivana Kindl, Petra Kurtela, Katja Kušec and Slaven Španović	2 November 2014
34	4	Damir Hoyka, Morena Makar, Duško Mucalo, Dunja Mutavelić, Andrija Škare and Anamarija Vrdoljak	9 November 2014
35	5	Luka Bulić, Blaženka Leib, Andreja Piskač, Amanda Prenkaj, Goran Šprem, Željko Vukmirica	16 November 2014
36	6	Ivan Buljubašić, Petra Dugandžić, Goran Grgić, Katarina Rautek and Ivan Vukušić	23 November 2014
37	7	Dino Jelusić, Jan Kerekeš, Tomislav Paškvalin, Jelena Percin, Ivana Plechinger and Bruno Šimleša	30 November 2014
38	8	Hrvoje Barišič, Frano Domitrović, Damir Markovina, Silvestar Dragoje Somi, Leonora Surian Popov and Martina Zubčić	7 December 2014
39	9	Petar Cvirn, Miljenko Cvitković, Vjeko Kobeščak, Aleksandar Kostadinov, Luka Nižetić and Tara Rosandić	14 December 2014
40	10	Maja Blagdan, Bojan Jambrošić, Damir Kedžo, Miran Kurspahić, Iva Šulentić and Zoran Vakula	21 December 2014
41	11	Dunja Fajdic, Melita Hrengek, Edvin Liverić-Bassani, Nevena Rendeli, Marko Tolja and Zlatan Zuhrić-Zuhra	28 December 2014
42	12	Duško Ćurlić, Krunoslav Klabučar, Ivan Planinić, Robert Seligman, Ivana Starčević and Nina Violić	4 January 2015
43	13	Marija Borić, Natali Dizdar, Jelena Pajić, Niko Pulić, Željko Tomač and Janko Popović Volarić	11 January 2015
44	14	Nika Fleiss, Jelena Kovačević, Ana Maras Harmander, Davor Meštrović, Marko Petrić and Ursula Tolj	18 January 2015
45	15	Sonja Basšić, Dušan Bućan, Luka Peroš, Mario Petreković, Dora Ruždjak and Ivan Šarić	25 January 2015

=== Season 4 (2016) ===
List of season 4 episodes
No. overall	No. in season	Guests	Original release date
46	1	Ivan Horvat, Mirna Maras, Sandi Cenov, Istok Rodeš, Jelena Glišić and Ankica Dobrić	18 September 2016
47	2	Vicko Dragojević, Mila Elegović, Hrvoje Kečkeš, Damir Kedžo, Danijela Pintarić and Marko Šapit	25 September 2016
48	3	Stjepan Božić, Mia Dimšić, Ivana Kindl, Daria Lorenci Flatz, Lara Živolić and Vedran Živolić	2 October 2016
49	4	Ervin Baučić, Lucija Ćustić, Mario Kovač, Robert Kurbaša, Petra Kurtela and Lucia Stefanija Glavich Mandarić	9 October 2016
50	5	Mia Anočić Valentić, Petar Atanasoski, Barbara Nola, Dubravko Šimenc, Ivica Skoko and Mirta Surjak	16 October 2016
51	6	Goran Karan, Zlata Mück Sušec, Stanko Šarić, Martin Sinković, Valent Sinković and Slavko Sobin	23 October 2016
52	7	Bojan Jambrošić, Marin Jurić Čivro, Barbara Kolar, Dora Lipovčan, Željko Pervan and Maja Posavec	30 October 2016
53	8	Jasna Bilušić, Dušan Bućan, Lea Mijatović, Mateo Resman, Božo Starčević and Kristijan Ugrina	6 November 2016
54	9	Goran Čolak, Goran Grgić, Damir Martin, Jelena Radan, Ivana Radovniković and Erna Rudnički	13 November 2016
55	10	Dado Ćosić, Dinko Glavaš, Tatjana Jurić, Ksenija Marinković, Pamela Ramljak and Đani Stipaničev	20 November 2016
56	11	Andrea Buča, Boris Đurđević, Robert Ferlin, Barbara Matić, Ivan Ožegović and Maja Šuput	27 November 2016
57	12	Anamarija Asanović, Giuliano Đanić, Emilija Kokić, Jelena Pajić, Nevena Rendeli and Gina Victoria Damjanović	4 December 2016
58	13	Marko Arapović, Hrvoje Hrengek, Ivanka Mazurkijević, Neda Parmać, Sanja Parmać, and Tara Rosandić	11 December 2016
59	14	Marija Borić, Tomislav Bralić, Zorica Kondža, Kristina Krepela, Ivan Dorian Molnar and Ana Šimić	18 December 2016
60	15	Ruža Janjiš, Jan Kerekeš, Danijela Martinović, Vedran Mlikota, Dean Pelić, Iva Šulentić	25 December 2016

=== Season 5 (2017) ===
List of season 5 episodes
No. overall	No. in season	Guests	Original release date
61	1	Marko Kutlić, Frano Ridjan, Tereza Kesovija, Matija Cvek, Ana Begić Tahiri and Duško Ćurlić	24 September 2017
62	2	Ivana Banfić, Mario Budišćak, Iva Ćurić, Iva Gortan, Sandra Paović and Uršula Tolj	1 October 2017
63	3	Vid Balog, Katarina Madirazza, Marko Makovičić, Nevio Marasović, Jelena Miholjević and Andrej Rašljanin	8 October 2017
64	4	Dominik Družeta, Anđa Marić, Jerko Marić, Ivan Planinić, Matija Prskalo and Dino Purić	15 October 2017
65	5	Tena Nemet Brankov, Sara Duvnjak, Monika Lelas, Krešimir Sučević Međeral, Antun Ponoš and Morana Zibar	22 October 2017
66	6	Petra Cicvarić, Edo Drakulić, Denis Dumančić, Kristina Salinović, Marko Tolja and Zora Vakula	29 October 2017
67	7	Adrijana Baković, Ivana Marić, Janko Rakoš, Martina Validžić, Ranko Zidarić, Zsa Zsa	5 November 2017
68	8	Valentina Fijačko, Ivan Jelić, Filip Juričić, Amanda Prenkaj, Hrvoje Rupčić and Mateo Videk	12 November 2017
69	9	Ksenija Erker, Ivana Habazin, Marko Hergešić, Ana Opačak, Kristijan Rahimovski and Maja Vučić	19 November 2017
70	10	Sandra Bosnar, Filip Detelić, Mladen Horvat, Brigita Matić-Ljuba, Zrinka Posavec and Zlatan Zuhrić	26 November 2017
71	11	Ana Gruica, Duško Modrinić, Tena Šikić, Ivica Zadro, Jasna Zlokić and Stipe Žunić	3 December 2017
72	12	Igor Barberić, Tomislava Gudelj, Saša Lozar, Mario Petreković, Iva Radoš and Katica Šubarić	10 December 2017
73	13	Mate Bulić, Ante Cash, Jakov Gavran, Vjeko Ključarić, Daria Hodnik and Žanamari Perčić	17 December 2017
74	14	Anđelo Kvesić, Ivan Kvesić, Barbara Rocco, Nada Rocco, Nenad Žugaj and Neven Žugaj	24 December 2017
75	15	Dora Fišter, Ana Maras, Martin Sinković, Valent Sinković, Daniela Trbović and Branko Uvodić	31 December 2017

=== Season 6 (2018) ===
List of season 6 episodes
No. overall	No. in season	Guests	Original release date
76	1	Ivana Lovrić, Lana Gojak, Siniša Ružić, Lucija Helena Kajić, Asim Ugljen and Sandra Bagarić	23 September 2018
77	2	Nikola Baće, Franka Batelić, Pero Galić, Anica Kovačević, Marko Petrić and Ivica Prtenjača	30 September 2018
78	3	Mirela Brekalo, Elizabeta Brodić, Natko Zrnčić-Dim, Nikša Kušelj, Lana Pavić and Marko Škugor	7 October 2018
79	4	Zlatko Kumrić, Davor Meštrović, Andrea Šušnjara, Barbara Vicković, Marko Vukes and Vanda Winter	14 October 2018
80	5	Marko Cindrić, Žan Jakopač, Tina Kresnik, Antonia Matković, Mada Peršić and Antonio Plazibat	21 October 2018
81	6	Petar Ćiritović, Eni Jurišić, Valentina Pereglin, Stjepan Perić, Mirela Priselec and Juraj Šebalj	28 October 2018
82	7	Minja Cvitković, Mia Dimšić, Enes Garibović, Stjepko Galović, Zlatko Pejaković and Jelena Perčin	4 November 2018
83	8	Saša Buneta, Ana Herceg, Nika Levak, Niko Pulić, Miki Solus and Željka Veverec	11 November 2018
84	9	Dajana Čuljak, Dubravka Lelas, Matej Meštrović, Maja Njirjak, Frano Ridjan and Dražen Turina	18 November 2018
85	10	Joško Čagalj Jole, Vlado Kalember, Ivana Lulić, Gordana Marković, Ivan Penezić and Ana Vilenica	25 November 2018
86	11	Petra Dugandžić, Lucija Šerbedžija, Ivana Starčević, Tara Thaller, Lukrecija Tudor and Ana Vučak Veljača	2 December 2018
87	12	Jure Brkljača, Ana Konjuh, Zdenka Kovačiček, Željko Königsknecht, Anja Matković and Luka Vidović	9 December 2018
88	13	Goran Bošković, Giuliano, Dino Jelusick, Iskra Jirsak, Mario Roth and Mirna Škrgatić	16 December 2018
89	14	Nikša Butijer, Antonela Đinđić, Domagoj Jakopović, Dean Kotiga, Marijana Mikulić and Sementa Rajhard	23 December 2018
90	15	Amar Bukvić, Mladen Burnać, Ana Đerek, Nela Kocsis, Tin Srbić and Mario Valentić	30 December 2018

=== Season 7 (2019) ===
List of season 6 episodes
No. overall	No. in season	Guests	Original release date
91	1	Maja Bajamić, Zlata Muck Sušec, Petar Dragojević, Zvonimir Ivašković, Ornela Vištica and Bruna Bebić	22 September 2019
92	2	Franjo Kuhar, Toma Medvešek, Jelena Miholjević, Ivan Dorian Molnar, Ivo Perkušić and Kristina Tomić	29 September 2019
93	3	Dora Dimić Rakar, Karlo Maloča, Damir Martinović, Ivanka Mazurkijević, Dino Rogić and Lara Živolić	6 October 2019
94	4	Mia Anočić Valentić, Lara Antić, Željko Krušlin, Nikola Nedić, Ivan Škunca and Sanja Vejnović	13 October 2019
95	5	Sabrina Hebiri, Bojan Jambrošić, Anastasija Jankovska, Lucia Stefanija Glavich Mandarić, Robert Mareković and Izabela Martinović	20 October 2019
96	6	Kristina Krepela, Karmen Sunčana Lovrić, Jakov Mađarić, Marija Vrajić, Lana Klingor and Linda Kliman	27 October 2019
97	7	Marko Braić, Matija Cvek, Natali Dizdar, Dora Fišter, Mia Krajcar and Daria Lorenci Flatz	3 November 2019
98	8	Ivan Đuričić, Ognjen Golubić, Nera Mamić, Lea Mijatović and Stefany Žužić	10 November 2019
99	9	Vanda Boban, Helena Gudelj, Ivana Kindl, Franka Klarić, Stjepan Lach and David Skoko	17 November 2019
100	10	Jan Kerekeš, Indira Levak, Sara Moser, Dunja Mutavelić, Hari Rončević and Manuela Svorcan	24 November 2019
101	11	Emina Arapović, Matea Elezović, Alen Marin, Gorana Marin, Filip Mayer and Romina Tonković	1 December 2019
102	12	Andrej Dojkic, Mila Elegović, Mladen Kovačić, Dina Levačić, Anita Matić Delić and Petra Svrtan	8 December 2019
103	13	Nika Turković, Kristijan Ugrina, Ana Marija Veselčić, Iva Visković, Mia Vladović and Jasna Zlokić	15 December 2019
104	14	Marija Borić, Nadia Cvitanović, Daria Knez, Đorđe Kukuljica, Fabijan Pavao Medvešek and Paško Vukasović	22 December 2019
105	15	Hrvoje Kečkeš, Vedran Mlikota, Maja Posavec, Tara Rosandić, Roko Sikavica and Zsa Zsa	29 December 2019

=== Season 8 (2020–21) ===
List of season 8 episodes
No. overall	No. in season	Guests	Original release date
106	1	Aklea Neon, Marko Cindrić, Martina Validžić, Sara Škrugor, Ana Gruica and Adam Končić	27 September 2020
107	2	Sandi Cenov, Antonela Đinđić, Petra Dugandžić, Lana Gojak, Marko Kutlić and Ana Vučak Veljača	4 October 2020
108	3	Domagoj Janković, Martin Kuhar, Lana Pavić, Luna Pilić, Anđela Ramljak and Boris Svrtan	11 October 2020
109	4	Jure Brkljača, Elizabeta Brodić, Marko Petrić, Dražen Turina, Iva Šulentić and Alka Vuica	18 October 2020
110	5	Lara Antić, Lana Barić, Saša Buneta, Bojan Jambrošić, Dubravka Lelas and Dino Petrić	25 October 2020
111	6	Katarina Baban, Mirela Brekalo, Amar Bukvić, Vjekoslav Ključarić, Mirela Priselec and Filip Rudan	2 November 2020
112	7	Tena Nemet Brankov, Gloria Dubelj, Matko Knešaurek, Zrinka Posavec, Barbara Prpić and Zlatan Zuhrić	8 November 2020
113	8	Dučan Bućan, Dino Jelusick, Martin Sinković, Valent Sinković, Adriana Vidović and Ana Vilenica	15 November 2020
114	9	Sara Duvnjak, Saša Lozar, Barbara Nola, Marina Redžepović, Arija Rizvić, Dunja Štokan	22 November 2020
115	10	Petar Atanasoski, Vedran Ljubenko, Katarina Madirazza, Ecija Ojdanić, Iva Jerković and Vlasta Ramljak	29 November 2020
116	11	Ana Begić Tahiri, Lidija Penić-Grgaš, Iskra Jirsak, Josipa Kusić, Mirna Maras and Tena Pataky	6 December 2020
117	12	Karla Brbić, Ksenija Erker, Ivana Krizmanić, Tomislav Krstanović, Jagoda Kumrić and Ana Ursula Najev	13 December 2020
118	13	Albina Grčić, Goran Karan, Stjepan Perić, Lucija Šerbedžija, Filip Vidović and Vanda Winter	20 December 2020
119	14	Duško Ćurlić, Mia Dimšić, Antonela Doko, Lela Kaplowitz, Iva Mihalić and Doris Pinčić	27 December 2020
120	15	Pero Galić, Josip Ledina, Ana Rucner, Marko Tolja, Daniela Trbović and Gina Viktorija	3 January 2021

=== Season 9 (2021–22) ===
List of season 9 episodes
No. overall	No. in season	Guests	Original release date
121	1	Patrik Lončarić, Mario Roth, Sandra Bagarić, Anton Lončarić, Erna Rudnički and Marijo Strahonja	26 September 2021
122	2	Miro Čabraja, Nika Fleiss, Damir Hoyka, Marin Klišmanić, Mario Kovač and Dunja Šaran	3 October 2021
123	3	Giuliano, Tesa Litvan, Ana Opačak, Maja Posavec, Matija Šakoronja and Davor Svedružić	10 October 2021
124	4	Damir Martin, Ognjen Milovanović, Izidor Pelajić, Antonia Dora Pleško, Toni Starešinić and Željka Veverec	17 October 2021
125	5	Lucija Ćustić, Karlo Cvetković, Filip Detelić, Dora Dimic Rakar, Alen Nižetić and Pamela Ramljak	24 October 2021
126	6	Hiljson Mandela, Ana Maras Harmander, Jerko Marić, Neda Parmać, Sanja Parmać and Eric Vidović	31 October 2021
127	7	Dino Antonić, Ivan Colarić, Jakša Jordes, Ana Majhenić, Pavle Matuško and Buga Marija Šimić Milošev	7 November 2021
128	8	Maruška Aras, Arijana Čulina, Goran Grgić, Igor Šeregi, Mirna Škrgatić and Fani Solomun	14 November 2021
129	9	Edita Lucić Jelić, Dora Lipovčan, Djordjija Palić, Ivan Penezić, Roko Sikavica and Ivana Starčević	21 November 2021
130	10	Vanja Matujec, Amanda Prenkaj, Ivica Pucar, Petra Svrtan, Romina Tonković and Asim Ugljen	28 November 2021
131	11	Goran Bošković, Petra Cicvarić, Dado Ćosić, Rok Juričić, Toni Kanaet and Indira Levak	5 December 2021
132	12	Ivo Amulić, Marko Hergešić, Damir Kedzo, Emilija Kokić, Antonija Mrkonjić and Zsa Zsa	12 December 2021
133	13	Edvard Abazi, Veronika Drljacic, Ella Dvornik, Mario Battifiaca, Mada Peršić and Mario Petreković	19 December 2021
134	14	Saša Antić, Antonia Ćosić, Ivana Jurković, Josipa Jurković, Andrej Rasljanin and Boris Štok	26 December 2021
135	15	Branimir Bubica, Natko Zrnčić-Dim, Domenica Žuvela, Ivana Kovač, Jurica Pađen and Marina Žužić	2 January 2022

=== Season 10 (2022–23) ===
The tenth season premiered on 25 September 2022. Dušan Bućan joined the series as the team captain, replacing Bojan Navojec from previous seasons.

List of season 10 episodes
No. overall	No. in season	Guests	Original release date
136	1	Mila Elegović, Nera Mamić, Dino Purić, Monica Jakšić, Lara Antić and Dubravko Šimenc	25 September 2022
137	2	Dea Presečki, Ivan Grgić, Daniela Trbović, Marino Jakobić, Sabrina Hebiri and Igor Delač	2 October 2022
138	3	Filip Rudan, Lovorka Sršen, Marijana Mikulić, Josip Palameta, Iva Visković and Ivana Kindl	9 October 2022
139	4	Arija Rizvić, Antonia Matković Šerić, Krešo Međeral, Mateo Videk, Zlata Muck Sušec and Morana Zibar	16 October 2022
140	5	Brigita Matić, Anđela Ramljak, Goran Šprem, Barbara Matić, Filip Vidović and Marina Orsag	23 October 2022
141	6	Antonela Đinđić, Jasna Zlokić, Filip Ude, Doris Pinčić, Domagoj Jakopović Ribafish and Ružica Maurus	30 October 2022
142	7	Tin Srbić, Romana Pavliša, Andrej Dojkić, Antonela Doko, Maja Bajamić and Hrvoje Rupčić	6 November 2022
143	8	Dino Petrić, Lea Mijatović, Davorin Bogović, Istok Rodeš, Ivana Lulić and Marin Ivanović	13 November 2022
144	9	Lorena Bućan, Nadia Cvitanović, Davor Meštrović, Stjepan Lach, Marko Petrić and Mia Krajcar	20 November 2022
145	10	Tea Harčević, Stjepko Galović Kandžija, Mirela Priselac Remi, Gordan Marijanović, Jagoda Kumrić and Matija Prskalo	27 November 2022
146	11	Elizabeta Brodić, Roko Vušković, Petar Dragojević, Gina Damjanović, Vanda Winter and Matej Meštrović	4 December 2022
147	12	Jure Brljača, Dino Antonić, Uršula Tolj, Buga Šimić, Mia Dimšić and Nikša Butijer	11 December 2022
148	13	Matija Cvek, Martin Sinković, Anđa Marić, Nika Turković, Valent Sinković and Jelena Miholjević	18 December 2022
149	14	Tara Thaller, Ornela Vištica, Tomislav Goluban, Marin Jurić Ćivro, Mirela Kardašević and Vedran Mlikota	25 December 2022
150	15	Jelena Žnidarić Zsa Zsa, Tin Sedlar, Ana Begić Tahiri, Nika Klepac, Iva Jerković and Zlatan Zuhrić Zuhra	8 January 2023

=== Season 11 (2023–24) ===
List of season 11 episodes
No. overall	No. in season	Guests	Original release date
151	1	Dina Levačić, Ana Vučak Veljača, Hrvoje Kečkeš, Mirna Mihelčić i Ecija Ojdanić and Paško Vukasović	24 September 2023
152	2	Marko Kutlić, Ivana Starčević, Jelena Perčin, Goran Orešković, Vjeko Ključarić and Lana Barić	1 October 2023
153	3	Lovre Kondža, Lucija Glavich Mandarich, Marko Alerić, Ana-Klaudija Štilinović, Katarina Madirazza and Ivo Amulić	8 October 2023
154	4	Anamarija Govorčinović, Mak Murtić, Marijana Perinić, Albina, Ivan Alduk and Dora Fišter	15 October 2023
155	5	Marco Cuccurin, Lucija Ćustić, Ognjen Golubić, Mia Negovetić, Barbara Suhodolčan and Duško Ćurlić	22 October 2023
156	6	Nika Barišić, Ana Radišić, Saša Lozar, Ana Uršula Najev, Zvonimir Radišić and Leonora Surian	29 October 2023
157	7	Anton Lončarić, Lana Gojak, Dražen Turina Šajeta, Patrik Lončarić, Ivan Penezić and Elis Lovrić	5 November 2023
158	8	Miro Čabraja, Monika Herceg, Lela Kaplowitz, Lucija Jelušić Šimatović, Vid Ćosić and Filip Juričić	4 February 2024
159	9	Ivana Jurković, Dorotea Zovko, Boško Picula, Josipa Jurković, Josip Brakus and Asim Ugljen	11 February 2024
160	10	Lana Ujević, Lucija Judnić, Damir Hoyka, Josip Ledina, Karlo Mlinar and Sandra Bagarić	18 February 2024
161	11	Lovro Juraga, Barbara Munjas, Lucija Šerbedžija, Stefany Žužić, Dorijan Klarić and Ivanka Mazurkijević	25 February 2024
162	12	Danijela Evđenić, Ivan Đuričić, Milan Majerović Stilinović, Gracija Filipović, Natko Zrnčić Dim and Tina Kresnik	3 March 2024
163	13	Marino Bloudek, Amanda Prenkaj, Mario Lipovšek Battifiaca, Jona Zupković, Jelena Pajić Ćulibrk and Davor Jurkotić	10 March 2024
164	14	Tesa Litvan, Filip Detelić, Sanja Doležal, Amanda Mlinarić, Tara Rosandić and Goran Grgić	17 March 2024
165	15	Dora Dimić Rakar, Bojan Jambrošić, Ivana Šilović, Rok Juričić, Andrea Andrassy and Barbara Nola	24 March 2024

=== Season 12 (2025–26) ===
List of season 12 episodes
No. overall	No. in season	Guests	Original release date
166	1	Ružica Maurus, Martin Sinković, Mila Elegović, Lana Ujević Talenta, Valent Sinković and Csilla Barath Bastaić	21 September 2025
167	2	Luka Novokmet, Jelena Žnidarić Zsa Zsa, Juraj Šebalj, Marina Ramljak, Filip Sertić, and Jurica Pađen	28 September 2025
168	3	Dora Dimić Rakar, Filip Detelić, Marina Orsag, Ananda Đuranović, Filip Vidović, and Asim Ugljen	5 October 2025
169	4	Lovro Juraga, Iva Šimić Šakoronja, Ivana Starčević, Natali Radovčić, Matija Šakoronja, and Mario Kovač	12 October 2025
170	5	Antonela Đinđić, Romina Tonković, Goran Grgić, Laura Sučec, Dino Antonić, and Jelena Perčin	19 October 2025
171	6	Kristijan Petelin, Mada Peršić, Vanda Winter, Hana Cvijanović, Roko Sikavica, and Jelena Miholjević	26 October 2025
172	7	Sergej Božić, Petar Cvirn, Jasna Zlokić, Domagoj Nižić, Domenika Žuvela, and Jelena Pajić Ćulibrk	2 November 2025
173	8	Jan Kovačić, Doris Pinčić Guberović, Damir Hoyka, Josip Palameta, Antonia Ćosić, and Vlado Šola	9 November 2025
174	9	Lara Nekić, Filip Ude, Ivana Kindl, Klara Fiolić, Lucija Ćustić, and Vedran Mlikota	16 November 2025
175	10	Pavle Matuško, Buga Marija Šimić-Milošev, Zrinka Posavec, Marko Kukurin, Barbara Munjas, and Filip Juričić	25 January 2026
176	11	Monica Jakšić, Andrea Šušnjara, Lana Barić, Dina Levačić, Antonia Matković Šerić, and Janko Popović Volarić	1 February 2026
177	12	Ana Širić, Damir Kedžo, Sandra Bagarić, Martin Kosovec, Elizabeta Brodić, and Dražen Turina Šajeta	8 February 2026
178	13	Matija Legović, Paško Vukasović, Matija Prskalo, Leona Popović, Sanja Milardović, and Miroslav Čabraja	15 February 2026
179	14	Tesa Litvan, Konstantin Haag, Marijana Perinić, Niko Čuturić, Jagoda Kumrić, and Luka Vidović	22 February 2026
180	15	Nika Barišić, Mia Dimšić, Niko Pulić, Dea Presečki, Miro Čabraja, and Sandi Cenov	1 March 2026
