= Ples sa zvijezdama =

- Title card used by Nova TV
- Genre: Dance talent show
- Based on: Strictly Come Dancing by: Fenia Vardanis; Richard Hopkins; Karen Smith
- Judges: Presenters and judges
- Country of origin: Croatia
- Original language: Croatian
- No. of seasons: 12 (Note: 9 seasons aired by HRT and 3 seasons aired by Nova TV)
- No. of episodes: 101 (Note: 65 episodes aired by HRT and 36 episodes aired by Nova TV) (list of episodes)

Production
- Running time: 90–130 minutes

Original release
- Network: HRT 1
- Release: 2 December 2006 – 21 December 2013
- Release: 31 October 2026 – present
- Network: Nova TV
- Release: 17 March 2019 – 21 May 2023

Ples sa zvijezdama (English: Dancing with the Stars) is a Croatian dance competition television series. It is the Croatian version of the British television series Strictly Come Dancing and a part of the global Dancing with the Stars television franchise. The series follows various Croatian celebrities paired up with professional dancers competing for the win an elimination-style format.

Originally produced and broadcast by HRT, Ples sa zvijezdama debuted on HRT 1 in December 2006 to a ratings success, becoming one of the most popular television series on the network during its run. After the eighth season concluded in 2013, the series went on a hiatus on HRT, until it was picked up by Nova TV, which aired three seasons from 2019 to 2023.

In November 2024, various Croatian news outlets reported that HRT had bought back the license for the series and was planning to air the ninth season, which is chronologically the twelfth season of the series to be produced in Croatia. The season premiered on 31 October 2026.

== Format ==
Various celebrities are paired up with professional dancers. Each week, the pair dances a certain style of dance, and their performance is scored by a panel of professional judges. Viewers can also cast their vote via televoting; the pair's final score is a combination of judge's and televote points. At the end of the episode, the weakest pair is eliminated. The highest-scoring pair wins at the end of the season.

== Cast ==
=== Presenters and judges ===
Color key

Host
Judge
Contestant
Professional dancer

| Cast member | HRT seasons | | | | | | | | Nova TV seasons | | |
| Cast member | 1 2006 | 2 2007 | 3 2008 | 4 2009 | 5 2010 | 6 2011 | 7 2012 | 8 2013 | 1 2019 | 2 2022 | 3 2023 |
|---|---|---|---|---|---|---|---|---|---|---|---|
| Barbara Kolar | ● | ● | ● | ● | ● | ● | ● | ● | | | |
| Duško Čurlić | ● | ● | ● | ● | ● | ● | ● | ● | | | |
| Janko Popović Volarić | | | | | | | | ● | ● | | |
| Mia Kovačić | | | | | | | | | ● | | |
| Maja Šuput | ● | | | | | | | | | ● | |
| Igor Mešin | | | | | | | | | | ● | ● |
| Tamara Loos | | | | | | | | | | | ● |
| Elio Bašan | ● | ● | ● | ● | ● | ● | ● | ● | | | |
| Milka Babović | ● | ● | ● | ● | ● | ● | ● | ● | | | |
| Davor Bilman | ● | ● | ● | ● | ● | ● | ● | ● | | | |
| Dinko Bogdanić | ● | ● | ● | ● | ● | ● | ● | ● | ● | | |
| Nicolas Quesnoit | ● | ● | ● | ● | | | | ● | ● | | |
| Tamara Despot | ● | ● | ● | | | | ● | | ● | | |
| Almira Osmanović | | | | | | | | | ● | | |
| Igor Barberić | | | | | | | | | | ● | ● |
| Franka Batelić | | | | ● | | | | | | ● | ● |
| Marko Ciboci | | | | | | | | | | ● | ● |
| Larisa Lipovac Navojec | | | | | | | | | | ● | ● |

=== Professional dancers ===
Color key

Won the season
Placed second in the season
Placed third in the season
Placed last in the season

| Professional dancer | HRT seasons | | | | | | | | Nova TV seasons | | |
| Professional dancer | 1 2006 | 2 2007 | 3 2008 | 4 2009 | 5 2010 | 6 2011 | 7 2012 | 8 2013 | 1 2019 | 2 2022 | 3 2023 |
|---|---|---|---|---|---|---|---|---|---|---|---|
| Nicolas Quenoist | Zrinka Cvitešić | Danijela Martinović | Daniela Trbović | Ana Ugarković | | | | Sanda Dubravčić | | | |
| Mirjana Žutić | Rene Bitorajac | Luka Nižetić | Luka Vidović | Frano Lasić | | Denis Ahmetašević | | | | | |
| Ištvan Varga | Maja Šuput | Nikolina Pišek | Zlata Muck | Franka Batelić | | | | | | | |
| Ivana Antinac | Žarko Radić | | | | | | | | | | |
| Ksenija Pluščec | Zoran Vakula | | | | | | | | | | |
| Leon Ajtlbez | Sandra Bagarić | | | | | | | | | | |
| Tamara Despot | Dubravko Šimenc | Davor Gobac | Nikša Kaleb | | | | Niko Pulić | | | | |
| Hrvoje Kraševac | Zdenka Kovačiček | Lana Jurčević | Antonija Šola | | Sanja Doležal | Jelena Perčin | Ana Begić Tahiri | | | | |
| Marko Herceg | | Iva Majoli | | | Ivana Brkljačić | Martina Tomčić | Nika Fleiss | Ornela Vištica | | | |
| Ana Herceg | | Damir Markovina | Mario Valentić | Gordan Kožulj | | Marko Tolja | Davor Radolfi | | | | |
| Žana Alerić | | Mirko Fodor | | | | | | | | | |
| Robert Schubert | | | Martina Zubčić | Vanessa Radman | Mila Horvat | Tatjana Jurić | Barbara Radulović | Iva Mihalić | | | |
| Sara Stojanović | | | Goran Grgić | | | | | | | | |
| Marija Šantek | | | | Vedran Mlikota | | | Saša Lozar | | | | |
| Damir Horvatinčić | | | | Iva Šulentić | Nera Stipičević | Lana Banely | Mirna Medaković | Žanamari Lalić | Josipa Pavičić Bernadini | | Petra Kurtela |
| Gabriela Pilić | | | | Sandi Cenov | | | | | Slavko Sobin | Marko Petrić | Frano Ridjan |
| Martina Bastić | | | | | Bojan Jambrošić | | | | | | |
| Ana Domišljanović | | | | | Petar Vlahov | | Frano Domitrović | Ronald Braus | | | |
| Tihana Devčić-Matijaščić | | | | | Zijad Gračić | | | Damir Hoyka | | | |
| Marija Stošić-Marinčić | | | | | Hrvoje Rupčić | Miro Ungar | Darko Janeš | Giuliano | | | |
| Lejla Bjedov | | | | | | Hrvoje Šalković | | | | | |
| Patrik Majcen | | | | | | | Blaženka Leib | Nevena Randeli | | | |
| Petra Jeričević | | | | | | | | Mislav Čavajda | | | |
| Valentina Walme | | | | | | | | Janko Popović Volarić | Davor Garić | Pedro Soltz | |
| Marko Mrkić | | | | | | | | | Viktorija Đonlić Rađa | Jelena Perić | Maja Drobnjaković |
| Paula Jeričević-Tonković | | | | | | | | | Ivan Šarić | Filip Vidović | Marco Cuccurin |
| Ela Vuković-Romanova | | | | | | | | | Marko Grubnić | | Alen Liverić |
| Gordon Vogleš | | | | | | | | | Sonja Kovač | Bojana Gregorić Vejzović | |
| Helena Janjušević | | | | | | | | | Damir Kedžo | Sandi Pego | Dario Zurovac |
| Marko Šapina | | | | | | | | | Ecija Ojdanić | Lucija Lugomer | |
| Mateo Cvenić | | | | | | | | | Nives Celzijus | Vlatka Pokos | Tara Thaller |
| Mario Ožbolt | | | | | | | | | Ana Vučak Veljača | Albina Grčić | Ana Zaninović |
| Alan Walme | | | | | | | | | | Domenica Žuvela | |
| Nika Jelić | | | | | | | | | | Asim Ugljen | |
| Ivan Jarnec | | | | | | | | | | Ivana Čuljak | Daria Lorenci Flatz |
| Helena Bradvica-Naletilić | | | | | | | | | | Matija Lovrec | Mario Mandarić |
| Patrik Seretin | | | | | | | | | | | Emilija Kokić |
| Rebecca Krajinović | | | | | | | | | | | Fran Lauš |
| Jakov Bjelac | | | | | | | | | | | Deniss Grgić |

== HRT seasons ==
| Season | Episodes | Originally released | | Winners |
| Season | Episodes | First released | Last released | Winners |
|---|---|---|---|---|
| 1 | 8 | 2 December 2006 | 20 January 2007 | Zrinka Cvitešić & Nicolas Quesnoit |
| 2 | 8 | 3 November 2007 | 22 December 2007 | Luka Nižetić & Mirjana Žutić |
| 3 | 8 | 25 October 2008 | 20 December 2008 | Mario Valentić & Ana Herceg |
| 4 | 8 | 31 October 2009 | 19 December 2009 | Franka Batelić & Ištvan Varga |
| 5 | 8 | 30 October 2010 | 18 December 2010 | Nera Stipičević & Damir Horvatinčić |
| 6 | 8 | 29 October 2011 | 17 December 2011 | Marko Tolja & Ana Herceg |
| 7 | 8 | 3 November 2012 | 22 December 2012 | Barbara Radulović & Robert Schubert |
| 8 | 8 | 2 November 2013 | 21 December 2013 | Mislav Čavajda & Petra Jeričević |
| 9 | 8 | 31 October 2026 | 19 December 2026 | TBA |

=== Season 1 (2006–2007) ===
The series premiered on 2 December 2006 on HRT 1. The first season was won by Zrinka Cvitešić and her partner Nicolas Quesnoit.

Cast of Ples sa zvijezdama season 1
| Celebrity | Notability | Professional partner | Result |
|---|---|---|---|
| Zdenka Kovačiček | Singer | Hrvoje Kraševac | Eliminated 1st |
| Dubravko Šimenc | Water polo player | Tamara Despot | Eliminated 2nd |
| Sandra Bagarić | Opera singer | Leon Ajtlbez | Eliminated 3rd |
| Zoran Vakula | Television meteorologist | Ksenija Pluščec | Eliminated 4th |
| Žarko Radić | Actor | Ivana Antinac | Eliminated 5th |
| Maja Šuput | Singer | Ištvan Varga | Eliminated 6th |
| Rene Bitorajac | Actor | Mirjana Žutić | Runners-up |
| Zrinka Cvitešić | Actress | Nicolas Quesnoit | Winners |

The highest scores of the season (40 points) were achieved by:

- Zrinka & Nicolas (Jive – 3rd episode)
- Zrinka & Nicolas (Slowfox – 4th episode)
- Maja & Ištvan (Paso Doble – 4th episode)
- Maja & Ištvan (English Waltz – 6th episode)
- Zrinka & Nicolas – total – 80 points (English Waltz & Paso Doble – 7th episode)
- Maja & Ištvan (Slowfox – 7th episode)
- Zrinka & Nicolas – total – 120 points (English Waltz, Samba & Freestyle – final episode)
- Rene & Mirjana (Freestyle – final episode)

The lowest score of the season was achieved by:

- Žarko & Ivana – 16 points (Samba – 5th episode)

=== Season 2 (2007) ===
The second season premiered on 3 November and concluded on 22 December 2007 on HRT 1. Luka Nižetić won with his professional partner Mirjana Žutić.

Cast of Ples sa zvijezdama season 2
| Celebrity | Notability | Professional partner | Result |
|---|---|---|---|
| Mirko Fodor | Television host | Žana Alerić | Eliminated 1st |
| Damir Markovina | Actor | Ana Herceg | Eliminated 2nd |
| Iva Majoli | Tennis player | Marko Herceg | Eliminated 3rd |
| Danijela Martinović | Singer | Nicolas Quesnoit | Eliminated 4th |
| Nikolina Pišek | Television hostess | Ištvan Varga | Eliminated 5th |
| Davor Gobac | Singer | Tamaea Despot | Eliminated 6th |
| Lana Jurčević | Singer | Hrvoje Kraševac | Runners-up |
| Luka Nižetić | Singer | Mirjana Žutić | Winners |

The highest scores of the season (40 points) were achieved by:

- Luka & Mirjana (Paso Doble – 6th episode)
- Lana & Hrvoje - total – 80 points (Quickstep & Paso Doble – 7th episode)
- Luka & Mirjana - total – 80 points (Tango & Cha-cha-cha – 7th episode)
- Luka & Mirjana (Paso Doble & Freestyle – final episode)

The lowest score of the season was achieved by:

- Davor & Tamara – 20 points (Samba – 5th episode)

=== Season 3 (2008) ===
The third season ran for eight episodes from 25 October to 20 December 2008 on HRT 1. The season was won by actor Mario Valentić and his professional partner Ana Herceg.

Cast of Ples sa zvijezdama season 3
| Celebrity | Notability | Professional partner | Result |
|---|---|---|---|
| Nikša Kaleb | Handball player | Tamara Despot | Eliminated 1st |
| Luka Vidović | Actor and magician | Mirjana Žutić | Eliminated 2nd |
| Goran Grgić | Actor | Sara Stojanović | Eliminated 3rd |
| Antonija Šola | Singer | Hrvoje Kraševac | Eliminated 4th |
| Martina Zubčić | Taekwondo athlete | Robert Schubert | Eliminated 5th |
| Daniela Trbović | TV host | Nicolas Quesnoit | Eliminated 6th |
| Zlata Mück | TV and radio host | Ištvan Varga | Runners-up |
| Mario Valentić | Actor and model | Ana Herceg | Winners |

=== Season 4 (2009) ===
The fourth season premiered on 31 October 2009 on HRT 1. The winning pair was Franka Batelić with her professional partner Ištvan Varga.

Cast of Ples sa zvijezdama season 4
| Celebrity | Notability | Professional partner | Result |
|---|---|---|---|
| Sandi Cenov | Singer | Gabriela Pilić | Eliminated 1st |
| Vanessa Radman | Actress | Robert Schubert | Eliminated 2nd |
| Frano Lasić | Actor and singer | Mirjana Žutić | Eliminated 3rd |
| Iva Šulentić | TV hostess | Damir Horvatinčić | Eliminated 4th |
| Vedran Mlikota | Actor | Marija Šantek | Eliminated 5th |
| Ana Ugarković | Chef | Nicolas Quesnoit | Eliminated 6th |
| Gordan Kožulj | Swimmer | Ana Herceg | Runners-up |
| Franka Batelić | Singer | Ištvan Varga | Winners |

=== Season 5 (2010) ===
The fifth season premiered on 30 October 2010 on HRT 1. The winner was Nera Stipičević with her professional partner Damir Horvatinčić.

Cast of Ples sa zvijezdama season 5
| Celebrity | Notability | Professional partner | Result |
|---|---|---|---|
| Hrvoje Rupčić | Musician | Marija Stošić | Eliminated 1st |
| Ivana Brkljačić | Athlete | Marko Herceg | Eliminated 2nd |
| Zijad Gračić | Actor | Tihana Devčić | Eliminated 3rd |
| Petar Vlahov | TV hostess | Ana Domišljanović | Eliminated 4th |
| Sanja Doležal | Singer | Hrvoje Kraševac | Eliminated 5th |
| Bojan Jambrošić | Singer | Martina Bastić | Eliminated 6th |
| Mila Horvat | TV hostess | Robert Schubert | Runners-up |
| Nera Stipičević | Singer and actress | Damir Horvatinčić | Winners |

=== Season 6 (2011) ===
The sixth season premiered 29 October 2011 on HRT 1. The season was won by Marko Tolja and his professional partner Ana Herceg.

Cast of Ples sa zvijezdama season 6
| Celebrity | Notability | Professional partner | Result |
|---|---|---|---|
| Tatjana Jurić | TV and radio hostess | Robert Schubert | Eliminated 1st |
| Miro Ungar | Actor and singer | Marija Stošić | Eliminated 2nd |
| Hrvoje Šalković | Writer | Lejla Bjedov | Eliminated 3rd |
| Denis Ahmetašević | Musician | Mirjana Žutić | Eliminated 4th |
| Jelena Perčin | Actress | Hrvoje Kraševac | Eliminated 5th |
| Martina Tomčić | Opera singer | Marko Herceg | Eliminated 6th |
| Lana Banely | TV sport journalist | Damir Horvatinčić | Runners-up |
| Marko Tolja | Singer | Ana Herceg | Winners |

=== Season 7 (2012) ===
The seventh season premiered on 3 November 2012 on HRT 1. The winners were Barbara Radulović and Robert Schubert.

Cast of Ples sa zvijezdama season 7
| Celebrity | Notability | Professional partner | Status |
|---|---|---|---|
| Nika Fleiss | Alpine skier | Marko Herceg | Eliminated 1st |
| Frano Domitrović | Actor | Ana Domišljanović | Eliminated 2nd |
| Davor Radolfi | Singer | Ana Herceg | Eliminated 3rd |
| Niko Pulić | Car racer | Tamara Despot | Eliminated 4th |
| Blaženka Leib | TV host | Patrik Majcen | Eliminated 5th |
| Darko Janeš | Actor | Marija Stošić | Eliminated 6th |
| Ana Begić | Actress | Hrvoje Kraševac | Eliminated 7th |
| Saša Lozar | Singer | Marija Šantek | Third place |
| Mirna Medaković | Actress | Damir Horvatinčić | Runner-up |
| Barbara Radulović | TV host | Robert Schubert | Winner |

=== Season 8 (2013) ===
The eighth season premiered on 2 November, and concluded on 21 December 2013 on HRT 1. The winner was Mislav Čavajda with his professional partner Petra Jeričević.

Cast of Ples sa zvijezdama season 8
| Celebrity | Notability | Professional partner | Status |
|---|---|---|---|
| Damir Hoyka | Photographer | Tihana Matijaščić | Eliminated 1st |
| Nevena Rendeli Vejzović | Journalist | Patrik Majcen | Eliminated 2nd |
| Janko Popović Volarić | Actor | Valentina Walme | Eliminated 3rd |
| Ronald Braus | Opera singer | Ana Domišljanović | Eliminated 4th |
| Žanamari Perčić | Recording artist | Damir Horvatinčić | Eliminated 5th |
| Iva Mihalić | Actress | Robert Schubert | Eliminated 6th |
| Giuliano | Singer | Marija Marinčić | Eliminated 7th |
| Sanda Dubravčić-Šimunjak | Ice skater | Nicolas Quesnoit | Third place |
| Ornela Vištica | Actress | Marko Herceg | Runner-up |
| Mislav Čavajda | Actor | Petra Jeričević | Winner |

=== Season 9 (2026) ===
In November 2024, various Croatian media news outlets reported that HRT is in the process of retrieving the license for the series. The ninth season, which would become the first season since 2013 to air on HRT 1, has been reported to most likely premiere in the Spring of 2025. HRT's 2025 financial plan also included provisions for a new season of the series, which was expected to air in 2025. However, despite these plans, the season was not produced in 2025 for unspecified reasons. The broadcaster's 2026 financial plan, published in December 2025, once again allocated funds for a new season, setting aside €1.2 million for its production. On 14 September 2026, HRT confirmed that the season is scheduled to air from 31 October to 19 December 2026, comprising eight episodes.

== Nova TV seasons ==
| Season | Episodes | Originally released | | Winners |
| Season | Episodes | First released | Last released | Winners |
|---|---|---|---|---|
| 1 | 12 | 17 March 2019 | 2 June 2019 | Slavko Sobin & Gabriela Pilić |
| 2 | 12 | 6 March 2022 | 29 May 2022 | Pedro Soltz & Valentina Walme |
| 3 | 12 | 5 March 2023 | 21 May 2023 | Marco Cuccurin & Paula Tonković |

=== Season 1 (2019) ===
In late 2018, various Croatian news outlets reported that the series is returning after the hiatus that followed the eighth season in 2013. The series was moved to Nova TV for a new season, which ran from 3 March to 2 June 2019. Slavko Sobin and his professional partner Gabriela Pilić won.

Cast of Nova TV's Ples sa zvijezdama season 1
| Celebrity | NotabilitY | Professional partner | Status |
|---|---|---|---|
| Ana Vučak Veljača | Actress | Mario Ožbolt | Eliminated 1st |
| Nives Celzijus | Singer, model, writer and actress | Mateo Cvenić | Eliminated 2nd |
| Ecija Ojdanić | Theater, television and movie actress | Marko Šapina | Eliminated 3rd |
| Davor Garić | Journalist | Valentina Walme | Eliminated 4th |
| Damir Kedžo | Singer | Helena Janjušević | Eliminated 5th |
| Josipa Pavičić Berardini | Model, singer, writer and journalist | Damir Horvatinčić | Eliminated 6th |
| Sonja Kovač | Actress and social media personality | Gordan Vogleš | Eliminated 7th |
| Marko Grubnić | Stylist | Ela Vuković | Eliminated 8th |
| Ivan Šarić | Stand-up comedian | Paula Jeričević | Third place |
| Viktorija Đonlić Rađa | Model and singer | Marko Mrkić | Runner-up |
| Slavko Sobin | Actor | Gabriela Pilić | Winner |

=== Season 2 (2022) ===
The second season premiered on 6 March, and concluded on 29 May 2022 on Nova TV. The season was won by Pedro Stolz and his professional partner Valentina Walme.

Cast of Nova TV's Ples sa zvijezdama season 2
| Celebrity | Notability | Professional partner | Status |
|---|---|---|---|
| Vlatka Pokos | Singer and TV host | Mateo Cvenić | Eliminated 1st |
| Lucija Lugomer | Model | Marko Šapina | Eliminated 2nd |
| Matija Lovrec | TV and radio host | Helena Bradvica | Eliminated 3rd |
| Ivana Čuljak | Baker | Ivan Jarnec | Eliminated 4th |
| Asim Ugljen | Actor | Nika Jelić | Eliminated 5th |
| Albina Grčić | Singer | Mario Ožbolt | Eliminated 6th |
| Bojana Gregorić Vejzović | Actress | Gordan Vogleš | Eliminated 7th |
| Domenica Žuvela | Singer | Alan Walme | Eliminated 8th |
| Marko Petrić | Actor | Gabriela Pilić | Eliminated 9th |
| Filip Vidović | Actor | Paula Jeričević | Fourth place |
| Jelena Perić | Vlogger and influencer | Marko Mrkić | Third place |
| Sandi Pego | Influencer | Helena Janjušević | Runners-up |
| Pedro Soltz | Model | Valentina Walme | Winners |

=== Season 3 (2023) ===
The third and the final season produced by Nova TV premiered on 5 March, and concluded on 21 May 2023. The season was won by social media influencer Marco Cuccurin and his professional partner Paula Tonković.

Cast of Nova TV's Ples sa zvijezdama season 3
| Celebrity | Notability | Professional partner | Result |
|---|---|---|---|
| Deniss Grgić | Influencer and artist | Jakov Bjelac | Eliminated 1st |
| Alen Liverić | Actor | Ela Romanova | Eliminated 2nd |
| Fran Lauš | Influencer | Rebecca Krajinović | Eliminated 3rd |
| Emilija Kokić | Singer | Patrik Seretin | Eliminated 4th |
| Petra Kurtela | Actress | Damir Horvatinčić | Eliminated 5th |
| Dario Zurovec | Politician | Helena Janjušević | Eliminated 6th |
| Ana Zaninović | Athlete | Mario Ožbolt | Eliminated 7th |
| Mario Mandarić | Chef | Helena Naletilić | Eliminated 8th |
| Tara Thaller | Actress | Mateo Cvenić | Eliminated 9th |
| Maja Drobnjaković | Para-athlete | Marko Mrkić | Eliminated 10th |
| Frano Ridjan | TV host | Gabriela Pilić | Third place |
| Daria Lorenci Flatz | Actress | Ivan Jarnec | Runners-up |
| Marco Cuccurin | Influencer | Paula Tonković | Winners |

== Reception ==
The series was a rating success for HRT, becoming one of the network's most popular shows over the years. The premiere episode of the fourth season, broadcast in 2009, drew an audience of almost million viewers.

The finale of the third season produced by Nova TV, broadcast on 21 May 2023 on, was watched by nearly 500,000 viewers which made up 38% of television viewers.
