= Ples sa zvijezdama season 6 =

Ples sa zvijezdama
- Season 6
- Hosted by: Duško Čurlić; Barbara Kolar
- Judges: Elio Bašan; Milka Babović; Davor Bilman; Dinko Bogdanić
- Celebrity winner: Marko Tolja
- Professional winner: Ana Herceg
- No. of episodes: 8

Release
- Original network: HRT 1
- Original release: 29 October – 17 December 2011

Season chronology
- ← Previous; Season 5 Next → Season 7

The sixth season of Ples sa zvijezdama, the Croatian dance competition television series based on Strictly Come Dancing, premiered 29 October 2011 on HRT 1. The season was won by Marko Tolja and his professional partner Ana Herceg.

== Cast ==
Cast of Ples sa zvijezdama (season 6)
Celebrity	Notability	Professional partner	Result
Tatjana Jurić	TV and radio hostess	Robert Schubert	Eliminated 1st
Miro Ungar	Actor and singer	Marija Stošić	Eliminated 2nd
Hrvoje Šalković	Writer	Lejla Bjedov	Eliminated 3rd
Denis Ahmetašević	Musician	Mirjana Žutić	Eliminated 4th
Jelena Perčin	Actress	Hrvoje Kraševac	Eliminated 5th
Martina Tomčić	Opera singer	Marko Herceg	Eliminated 6th
Lana Banely	TV sport journalist	Damir Horvatinčić	Runners-up
Marko Tolja	Singer	Ana Herceg	Winners

== Scoring chart ==
Color key:

indicates the couple that was eliminated
indicates the couple that finished in the bottom two

Bold numbers indicate the couples with the highest score for each week.
Italic numbers indicate the couples with the lowest score for each week.

Couple	Week							
Couple	1	2	3	4	5	6	7	8
★Marko & Ana★	**36**	31	**37**	**35**	**34**+8=**42**	35+**39**=**74**	**39**+35=74	39+**40**+**40**=**119**
Lana & Damir	25	28	25	34	29+**9**=38	**37**+37=**74**	36+**39**=75	**40**+**40**+34=114
Martina & Marko	29	**32**	24	**35**	30+7=37	**37**+30=67	**39**+**39**=**78**	
Jelena & Hrvoje	31	23	36	27	24+6=30	26+25=51		
Denis & Mirjana	26	**32**	24	30	24+5=29			
Hrvoje & Lejla	17	15	16	19				
Miro & Marija	25	22	28					
Tatjana & Robert	24	23						

The dances are color-coded as follows: Cha-cha-cha, Waltz, Rumba, Quickstep, Jive, Tango, Paso doble, Slowfox, Samba, Freestyle

== Episodes ==
No. overall	No. in season	Title	Original release date
41	1	"Episode 1"	29 October 2011
42	2	"Episode 2"	5 November 2011
43	3	"Episode 3"	12 November 2011
44	4	"Episode 4"	19 November 2011
45	5	"Episode 5"	26 November 2011
46	6	"Episode 6"	3 December 2011
47	7	"Episode 7"	10 December 2011
48	8	"Episode 8"	17 December 2011
