= Ples sa zvijezdama season 5 =

Ples sa zvijezdama
- Season 5
- Hosted by: Duško Čurlić; Barbara Kolar
- Judges: Elio Bašan; Milka Babović; Davor Bilman; Dinko Bogdanić
- Celebrity winner: Nera Stipičević
- Professional winner: Damir Horvatinčić
- No. of episodes: 8

Release
- Original network: HRT 1
- Original release: 30 October – 18 December 2010

Season chronology
- ← Previous; Season 4 Next → Season 6

The fifth season of Ples sa zvijezdama, the Croatian dance competition television series based on Strictly Come Dancing, premiered on 30 October 2010 on HRT 1. The winner of the season was Nera Stipičević with her professional partner Damir Horvatinčić.

== Cast ==
Cast of Ples sa zvijezdama (season 5)
Celebrity	Notability	Professional partner	Result
Hrvoje Rupčić	Musician	Marija Stošić	Eliminated 1st
Ivana Brkljačić	Athlete	Marko Herceg	Eliminated 2nd
Zijad Gračić	Actor	Tihana Devčić	Eliminated 3rd
Petar Vlahov	TV hostess	Ana Domišljanović	Eliminated 4th
Sanja Doležal	Singer	Hrvoje Kraševac	Eliminated 5th
Bojan Jambrošić	Singer	Martina Bastić	Eliminated 6th
Mila Horvat	TV hostess	Robert Schubert	Runners-up
Nera Stipičević	Singer and actress	Damir Horvatinčić	Winners

== Scoring chart ==
Color key:

indicates the couple that was eliminated
indicates the couple that finished in the bottom two

Bold numbers indicate the couples with the highest score for each week.
Italic numbers indicate the couples with the lowest score for each week.

Couple	Week							
Couple	1	2	3	4	5	6	7	8
★Nera & Damir★	28	**37**	**40**	**40**	**39**+**9**=**48**	**40**+**40**=**80**	**40**+**40**=**80**	**40**+**40**+**40**=**120**
Mila & Robert	**31**	31	32	36	36+8=44	36+39=75	38+36=74	39+39+**40**=118
Bojan & Martina	20	26	34	31	25+6=31	29+32=61	34+32=66	
Sanja & Hrvoje	27	32	31	35	32+7=39	29+32=61		
Petar & Ana	18	19	18	26	22+5=27			
Zijad & Tihana	25	20	22	22				
Ivana & Marko	21	21	21					
Hrvoje & Marija	26	24						

The dances are color-coded as follows: Cha-cha-cha, Waltz, Rumba, Quickstep, Jive, Tango, Paso doble, Slowfox, Samba, Freestyle

The highest scores of the season were achieved by:

- Nera & Damir – 40 points (Jive – 3rd episode; Paso doble – 4th episode; Tango and slowfox- 6th episode; quickstep and Cha-cha-cha - 7th episode; Tango, Paso doble & freestyle - finale)
- Mila & Robert - 40 points (freestyle - finale)

The lowest score of the season was achieved by:

- Petar & Ana – 18 points (Cha-cha-cha – 1st episode, Jive – 3rd episode)

== Episodes ==
No. overall	No. in season	Title	Original release date
33	1	"Episode 1"	30 October 2010
34	2	"Episode 2"	6 November 2010
35	3	"Episode 3"	13 November 2010
36	4	"Episode 4"	20 November 2010
37	5	"Episode 5"	27 November 2010
38	6	"Episode 6"	4 December 2010
39	7	"Episode 7"	11 December 2010
40	8	"Episode 8"	18 December 2010
