= Ples sa zvijezdama season 4 =

Ples sa zvijezdama
- Season 4
- Hosted by: Duško Čurlić; Barbara Kolar
- Judges: Elio Bašan; Milka Babović; Davor Bilman; Dinko Bogdanić
- Celebrity winner: Franka Batelić
- Professional winner: Ištvan Varga
- No. of episodes: 8

Release
- Original network: HRT 1
- Original release: 31 October – 19 December 2009

Season chronology
- ← Previous; Season 3 Next → Season 5

The fourth season of Ples sa zvijezdama, the Croatian dance competition television series based on Strictly Come Dancing, premiered on 31 October 2009 on HRT 1.

The winners of the season were Franka Batelić and her professional partner Ištvan Varga.

== Cast ==
Cast of Ples sa zvijezdama (season 4)
Celebrity	Notability	Professional partner	Result
Sandi Cenov	Singer	Gabriela Pilić	Eliminated 1st
Vanessa Radman	Actress	Robert Schubert	Eliminated 2nd
Frano Lasić	Actor and singer	Mirjana Žutić	Eliminated 3rd
Iva Šulentić	TV hostess	Damir Horvatinčić	Eliminated 4th
Vedran Mlikota	Actor	Marija Šantek	Eliminated 5th
Ana Ugarković	Chef	Nicolas Quesnoit	Eliminated 6th
Gordan Kožulj	Swimmer	Ana Herceg	Runners-up
Franka Batelić	Singer	Ištvan Varga	Winners

== Scoring chart ==
Color key:

indicates the couple that was eliminated
indicates the couple that finished in the bottom two

Bold numbers indicate the couples with the highest score for each week.
Italic numbers indicate the couples with the lowest score for each week.

Couple	Week							
Couple	1	2	3	4	5	6	7	8
★Franka & Ištvan★	**34**	**36**	38	**36**	**38**	**40**+**39**=**79**	**39**+**40**=**79**	**40**+**39**+**40**=**119**
Gordan & Ana	30	27	33	33	30	32+36=68	34+36=70	38+36+**40**=114
Ana & Nicolas	20	23	25	23	21	26+24=50	28+26=54	
Vedran & Marija	21	26	24	26	24	28+29=57		
Iva & Damir	30	33	**40**	35	36			
Frano & Mirjana	21	21	28	26				
Vanessa & Robert	24	28	24					
Sandi & Gabriela	22	21						

The dances are color-coded as follows: Cha-cha-cha, Waltz, Rumba, Quickstep, Jive, Tango, Paso doble, Slowfox, Samba, Freestyle

The highest scores of the season were achieved by:

- Iva & Damir – 40 points (Jive – 3rd episode)
- Franka & Ištvan – 40 points (Quickstep – 6th episode)
- Franka & Ištvan – 40 points (Slowfox – 7th and final episode)
- Franka & Ištvan – 40 points (Freestyle – final episode)
- Gordan & Ana – 40 points (Freestyle – final episode)

The lowest score of the season was achieved by:

- Ana & Nicolas – 20 points (Cha-cha-cha – 1st episode)

== Episodes ==
No. overall	No. in season	Title	Original release date
25	1	"Episode 1"	31 October 2009
26	2	"Episode 2"	7 November 2009
27	3	"Episode 3"	14 November 2009
28	4	"Episode 4"	21 November 2009
29	5	"Episode 5"	28 November 2009
30	6	"Episode 6"	5 December 2009
31	7	"Episode 7"	12 December 2009
32	8	"Episode 8"	19 December 2009
