= Ples sa zvijezdama (2019 TV series) season 3 =

Ples sa zvijezdama
- Season 3
- Hosted by: Igor Mešin; Tamara Loos
- Judges: Marko Ciboci; Igor Barberić; Franka Batelić; Larisa Lipovac Navojec
- Celebrity winner: Marco Cuccurin
- Professional winner: Paula Tonković
- No. of episodes: 12

Release
- Original network: Nova TV
- Original release: 5 March – 21 May 2023

Season chronology
- ← Previous; Season 2 Next → Season 9 (HRT)

The third and the final season of Nova TV's edition of the dance competition reality television series Ples sa zvijezdama, the Croatian edition of Strictly Come Dancing, premiered on 5 March, and concluded on 21 May 2023. The season was hosted by Igor Mešin and Tamara Loos. Marko Ciboci, Igor Barberić, Franka Batelić, and Larisa Lipovac Navojec joined the judges panel of the season.

The season was won by social media influencer Marco Cuccurin and his professional partner Paula Tonković.

This is the final season of the series to air on Nova TV. The series returned to HRT in 2026, which continued the original run by airing the ninth season.

== Cast ==
The cast of season 3 was revealed in February 2023.

Cast of Nova TV's Ples sa zvijezdama season 3
Celebrity	Notability	Professional partner	Status
Deniss Grgić	Social media influencer and artist	Jakov Bjelac	Eliminated 1st on 12 March 2023
Alen Liverić	Actor	Ela Romanova	Eliminated 2nd on 19 March 2023
Fran Lauš	Fitness influencer	Rebecca Krajinović	Eliminated 3rd on 26 March 2023
Emilija Kokić	Singer and the Eurovision Song Contest 1989 winner	Patrik Seretin	Eliminated 4th on 2 April 2023
Petra Kurtela	Actress	Damir Horvatinčić	Eliminated 5th on 9 April 2023
Dario Zurovec	Politician	Helena Janjušević	Eliminated 6th on 16 April 2023
Ana Zaninović	Taekwondo world championship gold medalist	Mario Ožbolt	Eliminated 7th on 23 April 2023
Mario Mandarić	Chef	Helena Naletilić	Eliminated 8th on 30 April 2023
Tara Thaller	Actress	Mateo Cvenić	Eliminated 9th on 7 May 2023
Maja Drobnjaković	Para-athlete	Marko Mrkić	Eliminated 10th on 14 May 2023
Frano Ridjan	TV host	Gabriela Pilić	Third place on 21 May 2023
Daria Lorenci Flatz	Actress	Ivan Jarnec	Runners-up on 21 May 2023
Marco Cuccurin	Social media influencer	Paula Tonković	Winners on 21 May 2023

== Scoring chart ==
Color key:

indicates the winning couple
indicates the runner-up couple
indicates the third place couple
indicates the couple that was eliminated
indicates the returning couple that finished in the bottom two
indicates the returning couple that finished in the bottom three, but was saved by the judges

Red numbers indicate the couples with the lowest score for each week
Green numbers indicate the couples with the highest score for each week

Ples sa zvijezdama season 3 - Weekly scores
Couple	Place	Week												
Couple	Place	1	2	1+2	3	4	5	6 (Note: In week 6, for the first time in the show's history, viewers had the opportunity to rate the stars. The audience became the 5th judge and the total range of marks was increased from the standard 40 to 50.)	7 (Note: In week 7, the dance couples had to match the dance steps prepared for them by last year's winner Pedro. According to Pedro, the most successful couple were Ana & Mario, who received 2 extra points. Also, couples competed in teams this week. Team Eliminators (Ana & Mario O., Maja & Marko, Mario M. & Helena N., and Tara & Mateo) danced the tango and got 37 points for it, while Team Ludacha (Daria & Ivan, Frano & Gabriela, Marco & Paula, and Dario & Helena J.) received 35 points for their cha-cha-cha, which were later added to the judges' points.)	8 (Note: In week 8, dance couples competed in a dance marathon. The couple that is eliminated first gets 1 point, the others get 2 points, and so on until the winning couple gets 7 points, which are then added to the jury's points. The winners were Marco & Paula.)	9 (Note: In week 9, the dance couples competed in duels where each judge gave a point to the couple he or she thought was better.)	10	11 (Note: In week 11, for the first time in the show's history, couples had a dance lottery. In the live show, each couple drew a ball that indicated which dance they would have to dance, and they had only 2 minutes to choose the costumes and rehearse the choreography.)	12
Marco & Paula	1	28	31	59	32	28	31	32+9=41	35+35=70	37+7=44	35+2=37	38+38=76	39+40+38=117	38+40+39=117
Daria & Ivan	2	21	26	47	30	34	33	33+8=41	37+35=72	34+4=38	36+3=39	39+38=77	37+40+37=114	38+40+39=117
Frano & Gabriela	3	25	31	56	34	34	29	32+9=41	35+35=70	37+5=42	38+3=41	39+38=77	39+39+39=117	39+40+38=117
Maja & Marko	4	29	29	58	27	27	28	30+9=39	30+37=67	37+3=40	33+1=34	34+36=70	36+37+34=107	
Tara & Mateo	5	28	30	58	28	31	31	32+8=40	36+37=73	37+6=43	33+2=35	37+38=75		
Mario M. & Helena N.	6	25	30	55	21	27	19	36+8=44	33+37=70	33+1=34	30+1=31			
Ana & Mario O.	7	26	22	48	25	27	31	29+8=37	31+2+37=70	26+2=28				
Dario & Helena J.	8	18	25	43	26	27	34	32+9=41	25+35=60					
Petra & Damir	9	28	24	52	28	25	32	30+8=38						
Emilija & Patrik	10	17	26	43	17	22	21							
Fran & Rebecca	11	15	18	33	18	17								
Alen & Ela	12	25	26	51	17									
Deniss & Jakov	13	21	24	45										

== Episodes ==
No. overall	No. in season	Title	Original release date
25	1	"Episode 1"	5 March 2023
26	2	"Episode 2"	12 March 2023
27	3	"Episode 3"	19 March 2023
28	4	"Episode 4"	26 March 2023
29	5	"Episode 5"	2 April 2023
30	6	"Episode 6"	9 April 2023
31	7	"Episode 7"	16 April 2023
32	8	"Episode 8"	23 April 2023
33	9	"Episode 9"	30 April 2023
34	10	"Episode 10"	7 May 2023
35	11	"Episode 11"	14 May 2023
36	12	"Episode 12"	21 May 2023

== Reception ==
The finale of the season, broadcast on 21 May 2023 at 20:15, was watched by nearly 500,000 viewers, which made up 38% of television viewers.
