= Ples sa zvijezdama (2019 TV series) season 1 =

Ples sa zvijezdama
- Season 1
- Hosted by: Janko Popović Volarić; Mia Kovač
- Judges: Dinko Bogdanić; Nicolas Quesnoit; Tamara Despot; Almira Osmanović
- Celebrity winner: Slavko Sobin
- Professional winner: Gabriela Pilić
- No. of episodes: 12

Release
- Original network: Nova TV
- Original release: 17 March – 2 June 2019

Season chronology
- ← Previous; Season 8 (HRT) Next → Season 2

The first season of Nova TV's edition of the Croatian dance competition television series Ples sa zvijezdama premiered on 3 March and concluded on 2 June 2019. It is the first season of the series to air on Nova TV, after the previous eight season ran on HRT 1 from 2006 to 2013.

The season was won by Slavko Sobin and his professional partner Gabriela Pilić.

== Production ==
In late 2018, various Croatian news outlets reported that Ples sa zvijezdama is set to return to television after HRT put the series on a hiatus following the eight season in 2013. The license for the series was obtained by Nova TV, making the season the first season of the series to not air on HRT 1.

Due to the network change, the hosts and the panel of judges were revamped. Janko Popović Volarić and Mia Kovačić replaced HRT's Barbara Kolar and Duško Čurlić as the presenters for the season. Dinko Bogdanić, who was the main judge in all of HRT's seasons, remained on the judging panel, and was joined by Nicolas Quesnoit, and Tamara Despot, who previously participated as professional dancers, as well as by Almira Osmanović. Davor Bilman, the main judge in previous seasons, did not return to the judging panel due to judging Nova TV's another talent show series, Supertalent.

Nova TV ordered 12 episodes for the first season, as opposed to HRT's previous eight episodes per season format. Although it is chronologically the ninth season of the series, Nova TV's programming schedule had it listed as season 1, given that it is the first season broadcast by the network.

== Cast ==
The cast of the season was revealed in February 2019.

Cast of Nova TV's Ples sa zvijezdama season 1
Celebrity	Notability	Professional partner	Status
Ana Vučak Veljača	Actress	Mario Ožbolt	Eliminated 1st on 24 March 2019
Nives Celzijus	Actress, singer, model and writer	Mateo Cvenić	Eliminated 2nd on 31 March 2019
Ecija Ojdanić	Theater, television and movie actress	Marko Šapina	Eliminated 3rd on 7 April 2019
Davor Garić	IN magazin journalist	Valentina Walme	Eliminated 4th on 14 April 2019
Damir Kedžo	Pop singer	Helena Janjušević	Eliminated 5th on 21 April 2019
Josipa Pavičić Berardini	Model, singer, writer and journalist	Damir Horvatinčić	Eliminated 6th on 12 May 2019
Sonja Kovač	Former actress and social media personality	Gordan Vogleš	Eliminated 7th on 19 May 2019
Marko Grubnić	Stylist	Ela Vuković	Eliminated 8th on 26 May 2019
Ivan Šarić	Stand-up comedian	Paula Jeričević	Third place on 2 June 2019
Viktorija Đonlić Rađa	Model, singer and wife of former basketball player Dino Rađa	Marko Mrkić	Runner-up on 2 June 2019
Slavko Sobin	Theater, television and movie actor	Gabriela Pilić	Winner on 2 June 2019

== Scoring chart ==
Color key:

indicates the couple that was eliminated that week
indicates the returning couple that finished in the bottom two
indicates the couple returned to the competition
indicates the winning couple
indicates the runner-up couple
indicates the third place couple

Red numbers indicate the couples with the lowest score for each week
Green numbers indicate the couples with the highest score for each week

Ples sa zvijezdama season 1 - Weekly scores
Couple	Place	Week													
Couple	Place	1	2	1+2	3	4	5	6	7	8	9	10	11	12	
Slavko & Gabriela	1	30	33	63	38	30	35	36	40+31=71		38+40=78	33+36=69	38+40=78	40+40=80	+40=120
Viktorija & Marko M.	2	30	32	62	28	37	34	32	32+35=67		35+40=75	35+40=75	37+40=77	40+40=80	+40=120
Ivan & Paula	3	22	31	53	31	33	26	35	39+35=74		40+37=77	40+36=76	39+36=75	37+39=76	
Marko G. & Ela	4	32	25	57	36	27	30	39	28+35=63		36+40=76	33+40=73	40+33=73		
Sonja & Gordan	5	25	28	53	27	28	32	29	25+31=56	34+35=69	35+32=67	31+34=65			
Josipa & Damir H.	6	33	27	60	30	37	29	29	34+31=65		31+31=62				
Damir K. & Helena	7	27	28	55	30	27	26	25		29+36=65					
Davor & Valentina	8	18	30	48	24	28	26			29+37=66					
Ecija & Marko Š.	9	19	25	44	18	26				20+23=43					
Nives & Mateo	10	28	20	48	18					24+25=49					
Ana & Mario	11	22	24	46						31+32=63					

== Episodes ==
No. overall	No. in season	Title	Original release date
1	1	"Episode 1"	17 March 2019
2	2	"Episode 2"	24 March 2019
3	3	"Episode 3"	31 March 2019
4	4	"Episode 4"	7 April 2019
5	5	"Episode 5"	14 April 2019
6	6	"Episode 6"	21 April 2019
7	7	"Episode 7"	28 April 2019
8	8	"Episode 8"	5 May 2019
9	9	"Episode 9"	12 May 2019
10	10	"Episode 10"	19 May 2019
11	11	"Episode 11"	26 May 2019
12	12	"Episode 12"	2 June 2019
