= Ples sa zvijezdama (2019 TV series) season 2 =

Ples sa zvijezdama
- Season 2
- Hosted by: Maja Šuput; Igor Mešin
- Judges: Marko Ciboci; Igor Barberić; Franka Batelić; Larisa Lipovac Navojec
- Celebrity winner: Pedro Soltz
- Professional winner: Valentina Walme
- No. of episodes: 12

Release
- Original network: Nova TV
- Original release: 6 March – 29 May 2022

Season chronology
- ← Previous; Season 1 Next → Season 3

The second season of Nova TV's edition of the Croatian dance competition reality television series Ples sa zvijezdama premiered on 6 March, and concluded on 29 May 2022.

The judging panel consisted of Igor Barberić, Larisa Lipovac Navojec, Marko Ciboci and Franka Batelić. The hosts were Maja Šuput and Igor Mešin, the former having previously competed in the first season of the series in 2006.

The season was won by Pedro Stolz and his professional partner Valentina Walme.

== Cast ==
The cast of the season was revealed in February 2022.

Cast of Nova TV's Ples sa zvijezdama season 2
Celebrity	Notability	Professional partner	Status
Vlatka Pokos	Singer & TV presenter	Mateo Cvenić	Eliminated 1st on 13 March 2022
Lucija Lugomer	Plus size model	Marko Šapina	Eliminated 2nd on 20 March 2022
Matija Lovrec	TV & radio host	Helena Bradvica	Eliminated 3rd on 3 April 2022
Ivana Čuljak	Baker & MasterChef Croatia contestant	Ivan Jarnec	Eliminated 4th on 10 April 2022
Asim Ugljen	Actor	Nika Jelić; Rebecca Krajinović (week 4); Helena Janjušević (week 6)	Eliminated 5th on 24 April 2022
Albina Grčić	Singer and Eurovision Song Contest 2021 representative	Mario Ožbolt; Marko Mrkić (week 6)	Eliminated 6th on 1 May 2022
Bojana Gregorić Vejzović	Actress	Gordan Vogleš	Eliminated 7th on 8 May 2022
Domenica Žuvela	Singer	Alan Walme; Mario Ožbolt (week 6)	Eliminated 8th on 15 May 2022
Marko Petrić	Actor	Gabriela Pilić; Valentina Walme (week 6)	Eliminated 9th on 22 May 2022
Filip Vidović	Actor	Paula Jeričević	Fourth place on 29 May 2022
Jelena Perić	Beauty vlogger & social media influencer	Marko Mrkić; Alan Walme (week 6)	Third place on 29 May 2022
Sandi Pego	TikTok influencer	Helena Janjušević; Gabriela Pilić (week 6)	Runners-up on 29 May 2022
Pedro Soltz	Model	Valentina Walme	Winners on 29 May 2022

== Scoring chart ==
Color key:

indicates the couple that was eliminated that week
indicates the returning couple that finished in the bottom two
indicates the returning couple that finished in the bottom three but was saved by the judges
as part of the winning couple of the week, the couple received two additional points for the following week.
indicates the winning couple
indicates the runner-up couple
indicates the third place couple
indicates the fourth place couple

Red numbers indicate the couples with the lowest score for each week
Green numbers indicate the couples with the highest score for each week

Ples sa zvijezdama season 2 - Weekly scores
Couple	Place	Week												
Couple	Place	1	2	1+2	3	4	5	6 (Note: Due to the partners switch week, each star got a new pro teammate for the week. Bojana, Filip & Pedro were unable to compete due to various reasons. Albina & Marko M. were the winning pair of the week and earned two extra points for their couples (Albina & Mario and Jelena & Marko M.))	7	8	9	10	11	12
Pedro & Valentina	1	29	28	57	31	34	35	-	34	35+2=37	39+6=45	37+33=70	39+39=78	40+40=80
Sandi & Helena J.	2	26	29	55	34	28	32	35	36	31	38+5=43	36+39=75	40+39=79	40+40=80
Jelena & Marko M.	3	26	27	53	29	34	34	35	38+2=40	32	38+7=45	33+38=71	38+40=78	39+39=78
Filip & Paula	4	30	31	61	30	32	32	-	36	37	32+2=34	35+40=75	38+38=76	39+38=77
Marko P. & Gabriela	5	26	25	51	30	32	36	36	38	34	35+3=38	38+39=77	36+39=75	
Domenica & Alan	6	22	29	51	30	30	32	32	36	30	36+4=40	31+34=65		
Bojana & Gordan	7	28	29	57	35	30	31	-	38	38	33+1=34			
Albina & Mario	8	25	24	49	29	29	33	37	31+2=33	31				
Asim & Nika	9	22	16	38	22	20	26	27	17					
Ivana & Ivan	10	21	18	39	21	20	21							
Matija & Helena B.	11	16	18	34	21	19								
Lucija & Marko Š.	12	21	22	43	27									
Vlatka & Mateo	13	20	21	41										

== Episodes ==
No. overall	No. in season	Title	Original release date
13	1	"Episode 1"	6 March 2022
14	2	"Episode 2"	13 March 2022
15	3	"Episode 3"	20 March 2022
16	4	"Episode 4"	3 April 2022
17	5	"Episode 5"	10 April 2022
18	6	"Episode 6"	17 April 2022
19	7	"Episode 7"	24 April 2022
20	8	"Episode 8"	1 May 2022
21	9	"Episode 9"	8 May 2022
22	10	"Episode 10"	15 May 2022
23	11	"Episode 11"	22 May 2022
24	12	"Episode 12"	29 May 2022
