= Ples sa zvijezdama season 9 =

Ples sa zvijezdama
- Season 9
- A montage of the couples' official promotional images and the new logo
- Hosted by: Barbara Kolar; Duško Ćurlić
- Judges: Daniela Trbović; Damir Horvatinčić; Mihaela Devald Roksandić; Robert Schubert
- No. of episodes: 2

Release
- Original network: HRT 1
- Original release: 31 October 2026 – present

Season chronology
- ← Previous: Season 8 (HRT); Season 3 (Nova TV)

The ninth season of the dance competition reality television series Ples sa zvijezdama, the Croatian edition of Strictly Come Dancing, premiered on 31 October 2026 on HRT 1. The season marks the return of the series to HRT after a 13 year hiatus which followed after the eighth season aired in 2013. During HRT's hiatus, the series moved to Nova TV, which produced three of its own seasons between 2019 and 2023, making HRT's ninth season the twelfth overall season of Ples sa zvijezdama to be broadcast in Croatia.

In November 2024, after the series finished its run on Nova TV, various Croatian news outlets reported that the series is set to return to HRT. The network's financial plan for 2025 outlined funds for a new season, but it was not produced that year for unspecified reasons. The season was eventually confirmed in September 2026. HRT confirmed the season is set to consist of 8 episodes, with the finale scheduled for 19 December 2026.

Barbara Kolar and Duško Ćurlić, who hosted all previous HRT seasons, returned as the hosts. The judging panel consist of Daniela Trbović, Damir Horvatinčić, Mihaela Devald Roksandić and Robert Schubert.

== Cast ==
The cast reveal began on 12 October 2026 through HRT's talk show series Kod nas doma.

The season marks Vedran Sraga's debut as a professional dancer, whereas Tamara Despot is the only returning professional dancer from HRT's seasons; she also judged the first season on Nova TV in 2019. The remaining professional dancers made their debut in Nova TV's seasons.

Cast of Ples sa zvijezdama season 9
| Celebrity | Notability | Professional partner | Status | Ref. |
|---|---|---|---|---|
| Dorijan Klarić | TV host | Gabrijela Pilić | Eliminated 1st on 7 November 2026 | |
| Alen Đuras | Singer | Paula Tonković | Participating | |
| Antonija Stupar Jurkin | TV host | Vedran Sraga | Participating | |
| Christina Zwicker | Gymnast | Patrik Seretin | Participating | |
| Ema Luketin | Influencer | Mateo Cvenić | Participating | |
| Ivan Dorian Molnar | TV host | Tamara Despot | Participating | |
| Ivica Skoko | Fashion designer | Rebecca Krajinović | Participating | |
| Lana Ujević Telenta | Actress | Gordan Vogleš | Participating | |
| Marija Husar | Singer | Ivan Jarnec | Participating | |
| Marko Bratoš | Radio presenter | Tina Walme Petrić | Participating | |

== Episodes ==
| No. overall | No. in season | Title | Original release date |
|---|---|---|---|
| 65 | 1 | "Episode 1" | 31 October 2026 |
| 66 | 2 | "Episode 2" | 7 November 2026 |
| 67 | 3 | "Episode 3" | 14 November 2026 |
| 68 | 4 | "Episode 4" | 21 November 2026 |
| 69 | 5 | "Episode 5" | 28 November 2026 |
| 70 | 6 | "Episode 6" | 5 December 2026 |
| 71 | 7 | "Episode 7" | 12 December 2026 |
| 72 | 8 | "Episode 8" | 19 December 2026 |
