= Ples sa zvijezdama season 3 =

Ples sa zvijezdama
- Season 3
- Hosted by: Duško Čurlić; Barbara Kolar
- Judges: Elio Bašan; Milka Babović; Davor Bilman; Dinko Bogdanić
- Celebrity winner: Mario Valentić
- Professional winner: Ana Herceg
- No. of episodes: 8

Release
- Original network: HRT 1
- Original release: 25 October – 20 December 2008

Season chronology
- ← Previous; Season 2 Next → Season 4

The third season of Ples sa zvijezdama, the Croatian dance competition television series based on Strictly Come Dancing, ran for eight episodes from 25 October to 20 December 2008 on HRT 1.

Duško Ćurlić and Barbara Kolar returned as the hosts of the season. Elio Bašan, Milka Babović, Davor Bilman, and Dinko Bogdanić returned as the judges.

The season was won by actor Mario Valentić and his professional partner Ana Herceg.

== Cast ==
The cast of the third season was revealed in October 2008.

Cast of Ples sa zvijezdama season 3
Celebrity	Notability	Professional partner	Result
Nikša Kaleb	Handball player	Tamara Despot	Eliminated 1st
Luka Vidović	Actor and magician	Mirjana Žutić	Eliminated 2nd
Goran Grgić	Actor	Sara Stojanović	Eliminated 3rd
Antonija Šola	Singer	Hrvoje Kraševac	Eliminated 4th
Martina Zubčić	Taekwondo athlete	Robert Schubert	Eliminated 5th
Daniela Trbović	TV host	Nicolas Quesnoit	Eliminated 6th
Zlata Mück	TV and radio host	Ištvan Varga	Runners-up
Mario Valentić	Actor and model	Ana Herceg	Winners

== Scoring chart ==
Color key:

indicates the couple that was eliminated
indicates the couple that finished in the bottom two

Bold numbers indicate the couples with the highest score for each week.
Italic numbers indicate the couples with the lowest score for each week.

Couple	Average	Week							
Couple	Average	1	2	3	4	5	6	7	8
★Mario & Ana★	34.8	**33**	**32**	34	36	32	32+31=63	35+36=71	39+**38**+**40**=**117**
Zlata & Ištvan	31.9	23	22	29	30	27	31+33=64	**39**+33=72	**40**+**38**+38=116
Daniela & Nicolas	**35.8**	25	30	**37**	**39**	**37**	**38**+**38**=**76**	**39**+**39**=**78**	
Martina & Robert	30.7	29	29	31	31	26	33+36=69		
Antonija & Hrvoje	31	20	**32**	35	**39**	29			
Goran & Sara	21	20	22	17	25				
Luka & Mirjana	21.3	20	23	21					
Nikša & Tamara	19	18	20						

The dances are color-coded as follows: Cha-cha-cha, Waltz, Rumba, Quickstep, Jive, Tango, Paso doble, Slowfox, Samba, Freestyle

The highest scores of the season were achieved by:

- Zlata & Ištvan 40 points (Tango – final episode)
- Mario & Ana – 40 points (Freestyle – final episode)

The lowest score of the season was achieved by:

- Goran & Sara – 17 points (Jive – 3rd episode)

== Episodes ==
No. overall	No. in season	Title	Original release date
17	1	"Episode 1"	25 October 2008
18	2	"Episode 2"	8 November 2008
19	3	"Episode 3"	15 November 2008
20	4	"Episode 4"	22 November 2008
21	5	"Episode 5"	29 November 2008
22	6	"Episode 6"	6 December 2008
23	7	"Episode 7"	13 December 2008
24	8	"Episode 8"	20 December 2008
