= S tobom =

2017 single by Franka Batelić

Single by Franka Batelić

from the album S tobom
- Released: December 4, 2017
- Recorded: 2017
- Genre: Pop
- Length: 3:26
- Label: Karpo Media
- Songwriters: Branimir Mihaljević; Neno Ninčević
- Producer: Branimir Mihaljević

Franka Batelić singles chronology
"Ljubav je..." (2013)	"S tobom" (2017)	"Crazy" (2018)

Music video
- "S tobom" on YouTube

"S tobom" is a song recorded by Croatian singer Franka Batelić. The song was released by Karpo Media on December 4, 2017. It was written by Branimir Mihaljević and Neno Ninčević and produced by Mihaljević.

"S tobom" was a commercial success, becoming Batelić's first single to reach the top 5 in Croatia.

== Background ==
"S tobom" is a power ballad and a pop song. On November 27, 2017, Batelić confirmed via social media that she will release her comeback single "S tobom" on December 4, 2017. The song was first played on Nives Čanović's 385 Show on Narodni radio on 4 December with Batelić interviewed live.

== Commercial performance ==
"S tobom" debuted at number 8 on the Croatian HR Top 40 singles chart, marking her second appearance on the chart, her first being with the single "Ljubav je...". "S tobom" became Batelić's first song to reach the top 10 on the HR Top 40 chart, in the issue dated December 11, 2017; her previous highest peak on the chart was with 2013's "Ljubav je...", which reached number nineteen. On December 18, 2017, "S tobom" fell from number eight to ten. In its third week on the chart the song rose to number seven. By mid-January the song reached number 5, making it Batelić's first top 5 single. "S tobom" reached number four in its fifth week on the chart. After one week the song moved from number four to number three, which became its peak. It spent 6 weeks inside the top 10.

== Music video ==
The music video premiered on December 10, 2017, it was filmed in Edinburgh, Scotland and directed by Sandra Mihaljević and Igor Ivanović.

== Track listing ==
Digital download

1. "S tobom" – 3:26

== Credits and personnel ==
- Songwriter, producer – Branimir Mihaljević
- Songwriter – Neno Ninčević
- Vocals – Franka Batelić
- Bass – Krešimir Kaštelan
- Cello – Neven Šverko
- Keyboards – Branimir Mihaljević

== Charts ==
Chart (2017)	Peak position
Croatia (HR Top 40)	3

== Release history ==
Country	Date	Format	Label	Ref.
Worldwide	December 4, 2017	Digital download	Karpo Media	
