= Crazy (Franka Batelić song) =

2018 song by Franka Batelić

Single by Franka Batelić

from the album S tobom
- Released: 6 March 2018
- Recorded: 2018
- Genre: Pop; Soul
- Length: 3:00
- Label: Karpo Media
- Songwriters: Branimir Mihaljević; Franka Batelić
- Producers: Branimir Mihaljević; Denis Mevlja

Franka Batelić singles chronology
"S tobom" (2017)	"Crazy" (2018)	"Kao ti i ja" (2018)

Music video
- "Crazy" on YouTube

Eurovision Song Contest 2018 entry
- Country: Croatia
- Artist: Franka Batelić
- Language: English
- Composer: Branimir Mihaljević
- Lyricist: Franka Batelić

Finals performance
- Semi-final result: 17th
- Semi-final points: 63

Entry chronology
- ◄ "My Friend" (2017)
- "The Dream" (2019) ►

"Crazy" is a song performed by Croatian singer Franka Batelić. It was announced on 13 February 2018 by HRT. The song represented Croatia in the Eurovision Song Contest 2018.

== Background ==
Prior to writing "Crazy", Batelić stated that she had written three other possible Eurovision Song Contest entries, but ultimately chose "Crazy" as she felt "it was the only right choice". "Crazy" was written by Branimir Mihaljević and Franka Batelić and produced by Mihaljević and Denis Mevlja. A snippet of the song was released on 26 February 2018. On 6 March 2018 it was revealed that a longer teaser of the song together with its music video would be shown as part of the evening news on HTV 1. The song was released as a digital download on 7 March 2018 through Karpo Media.

== Eurovision Song Contest ==
The Croatian national broadcaster Croatian Radiotelevision (HRT) originally planned to choose its representative through the national selection process Dora. In December 2017 it was revealed that the national selection process had been scrapped and how the representative would be chosen through internal selection instead. On 13 February 2018, the Croatian Broadcaster announced that Batelić would represent the country at the Eurovision Song Contest 2018. She performed in the second half of the first semi-final.

Batelić follows Jacques Houdek as the Croatian representative. Houdek qualified to the grand final of the 2017 contest, where he placed 13th with 128 points.

== Commercial performance ==
"Crazy" debuted at number six on the Croatian HR Top 40, marking her third appearance on the chart, her first two being with the singles "Ljubav je..." and "S tobom" respectively. In its second week on the chart the song rose to number three, making it Croatia's highest charting Eurovision Song Contest entry on the HR Top 40. Afterwards it became Batelić's first song to reach number two on the HR Top 40, in the issue dated 2 April 2018; her previous highest peak on the chart was with 2017's "S tobom", which reached number three.

== Music video ==
The video's teaser was released on 26 February 2018. The music video for "Crazy" was directed by Sandra Mihaljević and Igor Ivanović, who had previously collaborated with Batelić on the music video for her single "S tobom". The video was filmed in the "Zorin Dom" theater in Karlovac.

== Track listing ==
Digital download
No.	Title	Length
1.	"Crazy"	3:00
2.	"Crazy" (instrumental)	3:00

== Charts ==
Chart (2018)	Peak position
Croatia (HR Top 40)	2

== Release history ==
Region	Date	Format	Label	Ref.
Croatia	6 March 2018	Radio premiere	Karpo Media	
Various	7 March 2018	Digital download	Karpo Media	
