= Maja Šuput =

Croatian pop singer and actress

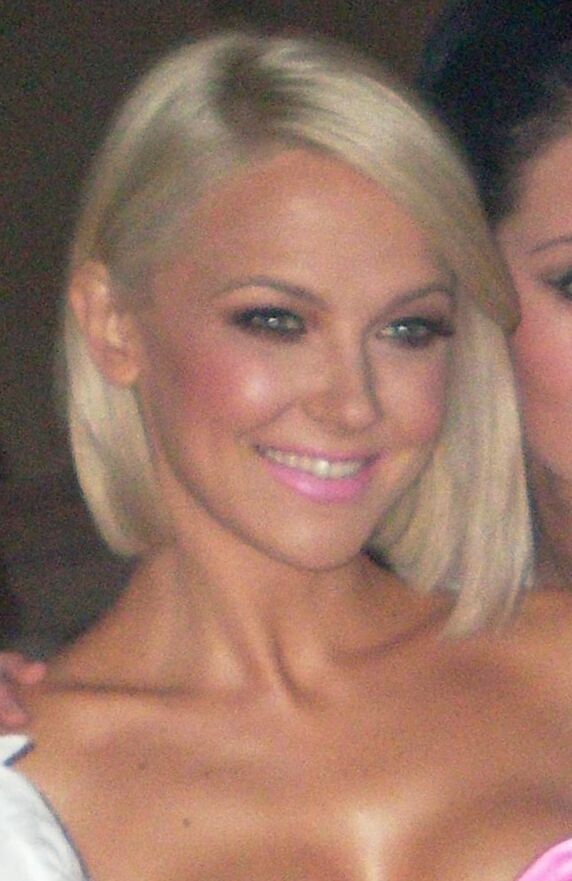
- Maja Šuput at Dora 2008
- Born: Maja Šuput; 22 September 1979 (age 47); Zagreb, SR Croatia, SFR Yugoslavia
- Occupations: Singer; actress; TV host; model
- Years active: 1998–present
- Television: Supertalent
- Spouse: Nenad Tatarinov (m. 2019; div. 2025)
- Children: 1
- Musical career
- Genres: Pop; folk
- Instrument: Vocals
- Labels: Menart; Hit Records; Croatia Records

Maja Šuput (born 22 September 1979) is a Croatian singer, actress, television host and businesswoman.

== Biography ==
Šuput was born on 22 September 1979, in Zagreb, as the only child of mother Danica and father Boris Šuput.

== Career ==
=== Music ===
Šuput started her career in 1998 as a member of the Croatian group Enjoy, but left in 2002, to pursue her solo career. She made several attempts to represent Croatia at the Eurovision Song Contest by participating in Dora, the Croatian national selection competition. She competed four times: in 1999 and 2000 as a member of the group Joy with the songs "Uzalud" (17th place) and "Baby" (13th place), respectively; in 2003 as part of Maja Šuput & Enjoy with the song "Čista petica", finishing 6th; and in 2008 as a solo artist with the song "Lako zaljubljiva", finishing 5th.

In the 2010s, she released the songs "Svatovska" (Wedding Song) and "Djevojačko veče" (Bachelorette Party), both of which became popular party anthems at Croatian weddings and celebrations; the music video for the latter amassed over 7 million views on YouTube. The popularity of these songs contributed to Šuput being described in the media as "the most sought-after wedding singer" and "the queen of weddings."

In September 2015, Šuput released "Lopove" (Thief), which has amassed over 31 million views on YouTube by 2025, becoming the biggest hit song of her musical career.

=== Television and other media ===
Since 2017, Šuput has been a judge on Nova TV's reality show Supertalent, together with Davor Bilman, Fabijan Pavao Medvešek, and Martina Tomčić. From 2020 to 2021, Šuput co-hosted Tvoje lice zvuči poznato, Nova TV's singing reality series based on Your Face Sounds Familiar; she had previously also competed in the second season of the series in 2015. In 2022, she hosted Nova TV's second season of Ples sa zvijezdama (the Croatian edition of Strictly Come Dancing), after previously also having competed on the first season of the series in 2006.

Šuput voiced Smurfette in the Croatian dub of the upcoming 2025 film Smurfs.

=== Business ventures ===
Šuput co-founded the lifestyle brand Majushka with her former husband Nenad Tatarinov in 2018, initially selling custom-designed microphones before expanding into children’s products such as coloring books, diaries, makeup, and dolls. Following their divorce in 2025, the company was renamed Fun Animation d.o.o., while Šuput continues to manage two other active companies, Šuput d.o.o. and Dobra djevojka d.o.o., focused on publishing and artistic production, respectively.

== Personal life ==
Her father Boris died in October 2018. On 12 May 2019, Šuput married a businessman, Nenad Tatarinov, at a private ceremony in Istria. On 17 March 2021, she gave birth to a son named Bloom. Šuput and Tatarinov divorced in 2025.

Šuput has publicly expressed her support towards the LGBT community; she performed at a gay wedding in 2016. In a 2018 interview with Dalibor Petko for CMC, she said: "I am a bit of a gay icon here in Croatia".

== Discography ==
- Enjoy (2000)
- Uzmi me (2001)
- Čista 5-ica (2003)
- Obori me s nogu (2006)
- Nevaljala (2011)
- Showgirl (2015)

== Filmography ==
- Tvoje lice zvuči poznato – host (2020)
- Zvijezde pod hipnozom – guest (2019)
- Ples sa zvijezdama – guest (2019)
- Exkluziv Tabloid
- Top.HR – guest
- Špica, riva, korzo – guest (2018)
- Supertalent – judge (2017–present)
- Sve u šest
- Tvoje lice zvuči poznato – guest judge (2015, 2018)
- Volim Hrvatsku (2012)
- IN Magazin
- Ne zaboravi stihove (2009)
- Zauvijek susjedi – Maria (2008)
- Naša mala klinika – Herself (2006)
- Red Carpet

=== Synchronization ===
- UglyDolls – Moksi (2019)
