= Kao ti i ja =

Single by Franka Batelić
- Released: June 28, 2018
- Recorded: 2018
- Genre: Pop
- Length: 3:12
- Label: Karpo Media
- Songwriters: Branimir Mihaljević; Neno Ninčević
- Producer: Branimir Mihaljević

Franka Batelić singles chronology
"Crazy" (2018)	"Kao ti i ja" (2018)	"Ti mi nosiš sreću" (2018)

Music video
- "Kao ti i ja" on YouTube

"Kao ti i ja" is a song recorded by Croatian singer Franka Batelić. The song was released by Karpo Media on June 28, 2018. It was written by Branimir Mihaljević and Neno Ninčević and produced by Mihaljević.

== Commercial performance ==
"Kao ti i ja" debuted at number eight on the Croatian HR Top 40, marking her fourth appearance and second top ten debut on the chart. Later it peaked at number 3.

== Track listing ==
Digital download
No.	Title	Length
1.	"Kao ti i ja"	3:12

== Charts ==
Chart (2018)	Peak position
Croatia (HR Top 40)	3

== Release history ==
Region	Date	Format	Label	Ref.
Croatia	27 June 2018	Radio premiere	Karpo Media	
Various	28 March 2018	Digital download	Karpo Media	
