= Sonja Kovač =

Croatian actress, model and singer (born 1984)

- Born: 18 June 1984 (age 42); Bjelovar, SR Croatia, SFR Yugoslavia
- Occupation: Actress
- Years active: 2007–present
- Partner: Goran Mandić
- Children: 1

Sonja Kovač (born 18 June 1984) is a Croatian actress, model and singer.

== Filmography ==
=== Television roles ===
Film
Year	Title	Role	Notes
2007–2008	Zauvijek susjedi	Viktorija "Viki"	Main role; 179 episodes
2008	Bračne vode	Kristina "Tina" Bandić	Main role; 15 episodes
2010	Najbolje godine	Dorotea	Guest; 6 episodes
2016	Split Homicide	Lena Knežević	Guest; 1 episode
2016	Nad lipom 35	Journalist	Guest; 1 episode
2019	Ples sa zvijezdama	Herself (contestant)	Nova TV's season 1; 5th place
