= Damir Hoyka =

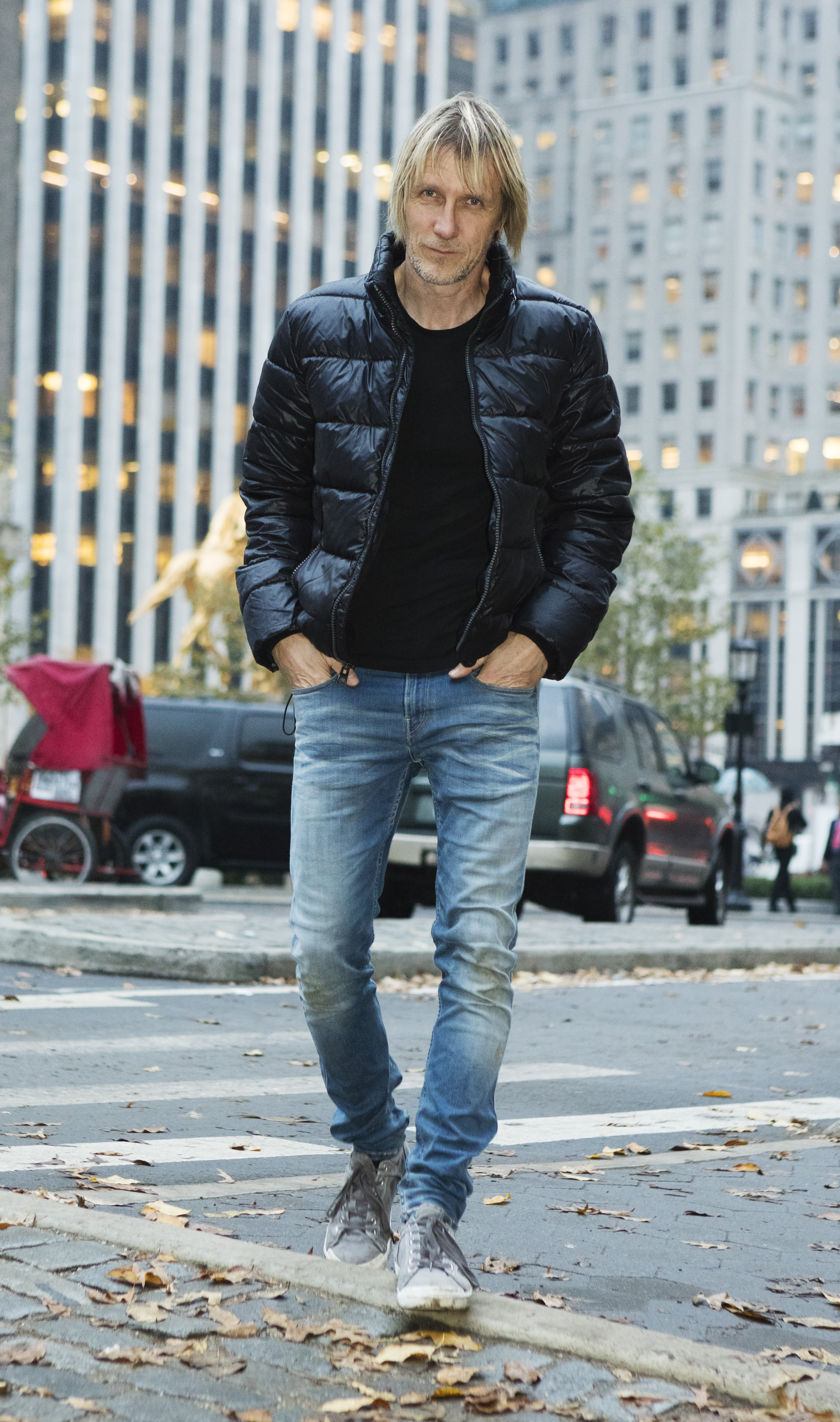
- Hoyka in 2015
- Born: 23 April 1967 (age 59); Brežice, Slovenia
- Known for: Photography

Damir Hoyka (born 23 April 1967) is a Croatian fine art and advertising photographer. The focus of his work are portraits and creative personal projects, and lately his educational project Fotosofia where he shares his knowledge and experience with photography talents. He has won several awards.

== Early life ==
Hoyka was born in Brežice, Slovenia to Croatian parents. Three days later he was in his parents' house in Zagreb where he grew up. His enthusiasm for visual expression showed up during the summer 1981 when he started drawing comics. He finished high school in Zagreb – first two years he studied at MIOC (Mathematical Informational Educational Center), and second two years at CEZAKUM (Center for Culture and Arts). During high school years he continued to draw until photography caught his attention.

== Photography career ==
His first photographs were published in 1985. In 1988 he studied German at the Goethe Institute in Munich in order to be able to study in German-speaking area. In 1989 he enrolled at the Faculty for Applied Arts in Vienna (Prof. Eva Choung-Fux) as a guest student. In 1991 he obtained the status of professional artist (HZSU, Zagreb). In 1995 he lectured on photography at the photo-workshop of the Croatian Photographic Association. In 1996 he published the essay Fotosofia, a collection of personal insights in photography. In the essay he is presenting one of the possible ways of observing, understanding, explaining and "using" the photographic medium. In 1998 invited by the authorities of the city of Mainz, he participated in the international artists' project Art in the City. In 1999, invited by the organizing committee of the 5th International Project for Fine Arts, in Graz, Austria, he participated in the project "If I don't get it, I'll give you no peace". In 2003 he published the photo book Metal Dreams in collaboration with the Austrian artist Thelma Herzl. In 2004 he published the photo book Celebrity Fair. In the same year he launched a cycle of art events called Art4All, encouraging the audience to take a more active role in art communication. In 2005 he was a guest actor in the RTL TV novel Forbidden love (Zabranjena ljubav). In 2006 he started annual seminar named after his essay Fotosofia. For each seminar he selects 15 participants by the contest. The strongholds of the seminar are photo education, creativity, networking, photographer's real-life situation experience, networking and promotion of seminarist's work and personality. In 2008 he founded the photo portal www.fotosofia.info with the goal to connect all photo admirers – photographers and photo audience. In 2008 from Photo Club Zagreb he received Tošo Dabac prize for achievements in the fields of photographic art, and the developing and promotion of photographic culture. In 2008 he was a member of the Croatia's Top Model jury. In 2009 he published the SF novel Xavia. In 2013. he took part in the show Dancing with the Stars. To date he has published in the mass media thousands of fine art and applied-art photographs, exhibited at a numerous solo and collective shows, put on a number of multimedia projects, and has been a member and president of numerous photo juries. Hoyka has won several prizes for his work.

== Selected books ==
- 1996. Essay Fotosofia, ISBN 953609214X, Studio grafičkih ideja, Zagreb
- 2003. Photo book Metal Dreams with Thelma Herzl, ISBN 3-85498-265-8, Christian Brandstaetter Verlagsgesellschaft, Wien
- 2004. Photo book Celebrity Fair, ISBN 953-196-288-X, Mozaik knjiga, Zagreb
- 2009. SF novel Xavia, ISBN 9789533040264, VBZ, Zagreb

== Fotosofia ==
On the base of the essay Fotosofia, in 1996 Hoyka started the Fotosofia annual seven-day photo seminar, sharing the ideas from the essay with fifteen seminarists he chooses via contest. The seminar is conceived as a combination of photo theory and photo praxis, including photo shootings of different genres and guest lecturers from disciplines directly and indirectly connected with photography. On the base of the seminar, in 2008 he founded the photo portal www.fotosofia.info

== Bibliography ==
- Glavan, Darko (2007.) "The Dilemmas and Frontiers of the Photographer of the Future", Granica/Frontier, p. 5. Mimara Museum, Zagreb. ISBN 9789532480146
- Glavan, Darko (2004.) "The Portrait - From the Visual Facts to the Individual Personality", Celebrity Fair, p. 25-31. Mozaik knjiga, Zagreb. ISBN 953-196-288-X
- Herzl, Anton (2003.) "Metal Dreams", Metal Dreams: Metamorphosen islaendischer Erde, p. 18-34. Christian Brandstaetter Verlagsgesellschaft, Wien. ISBN 3-85498-265-8
- Glavan, Darko (2000.) "Shots Between the Light and the Dark", Atomystica, p. 5. Mimara Museum, Zagreb. ISBN 9536100746
- Jurčec Kos, Koraljka (1998.) "Vremenska vrata/Time Gate", Vremenska vrata/Time Gate, p. 7. MGC Klovićevi dvori – Gradec, Zagreb. ISBN 9536100452
- Jalšić Ernečić, Draženka (1996.) "Ritual&Flashback", Ritual&Flashback, p. 5. The Museum of the city of Koprivnica, Koprivnica. ISBN 9536243032
- Križić-Roban, Sandra/Matičević, Davor/Glavan, Darko (1996.) "Ritual&Flashback", Ritual&Flashback, p. 27. The Museum of the city of Koprivnica, Koprivnica. ISBN 9536243032
- Zloić, Sandra (2013.) "Foto Futur Flora", Flora, p. 2-3. The city of Labin, Labin.
- Dragišić, Emilija (2011.) "Dnevnik ili novi liberalizam vođenja osobnog dnevnika", Dnevnik, p. 3-4. Museum of the city of Bjelovar, Bjelovar.
- Ljevak, Kristina. "Fotosofia plemenski savez istomišljenika", p. 56-63. Urban Magazine, Sarajevo, 15 June 2015.
- Macukić, Viktorija. "Talenti iz Hoykine radionice", p. 102. Globus, Zagreb, 22 May 2015.
- Ujdur, Anteja. "Konstruktor s fotoaparatom", p. 34-40. Jet Set Magazine, Zagreb, 20 December 2014.
- Marinović, Dea. "Fotosofia - Put do uspjeha", p. 20. Večernji list, Zagreb, 5 May 2013.
- Žlof, Ksenija. "The Story of Life Energy", p. 94-97. Croatia Airlines Inflight Magazine, Zagreb, December 2001.
- Brezovečki-Biđin, Iva. "Aluminijem u Island", Vijenac, Zagreb, 18 April 2002.
- Tolić, Vlasta. "Erupcija svjetlosti na vulkanskom otoku", Vjesnik, Zagreb, 21 April 2002.
- Jendrić, Dotrotea. "Island kao novo iskušenje", p. 18. Večernji list, Zagreb, 22 April 2002.

== Awards ==
- 1991. Honorable Mention at the 1st Seoul Contest of International Nude Photography, Seoul, South Korea.
- 1993. Honorable Mention at the 3rd Seoul Contest of International Nude Photography, Seoul, South Korea.
- 1994. Honorable Mention at the 29th Korea International Salon of Photography, Seoul, South Korea.
- 1995. Honorable Mention at the 3rd International Salon of Photography, Rovinj, Croatia.
- 1995. Medal of the 56th Japan International Salon of Photography, Tokyo, Japan.
- 2009. Price Tošo Dabac for the year 2008, for achievements in the fields of photographic art, and the developing and promotion of photographic culture, Zagreb, Croatia
- 2010. Price SFera for the best Croatian SF novel in the year 2009, Zagreb, Croatia
- 2010. Price Artefakt for the best Croatian SF novel in the year 2009, Rijeka, Croatia
