= Marko Ciboci =

Croatian dance artist

- Born: 13 July 1981 (age 44); Zagreb, Croatia
- Occupations: Choreographer, Dancer, Adjudicator, Host
- Television: NOVA TV
- Height: 196 cm (6 ft 5 in)
- Honours: Noble
- Website: www.markociboci.com

Marko Ciboci is a Croatian dance artist and international dance adjudicator.

== Biography ==
He was born in Zagreb, Croatia in 1981, his family name is from an Italian noble family from the city of Gorizia, Italy. He finished a master's degree at the University of Zagreb.

== Dance career ==
During his competitive dance career, he was the winner of many local and international dance competitions in Latin & Ballroom dances. In his professional career, he was a six times professional Croatian Champion in Latin dances, in 2009, 2010, 2011 with his Russian dance partner Polina Golubeva and in 2015, 2016, 2017 with his Croatian dance partner Anja Lopert. In 2018 he has become the finalist of the World Cup Theater Arts in Kremlin, Moscow along with his Russian dance partner Alexandra Akimova. In 2012,2013,2014 Marko has won the North American Championship in the same-sex division representing USA.

== Activities ==
In 2017 he has become the founder and the elected President of the National Dance Council of Croatia. In 2018 he becomes co-founder of the European Dance Organization and European Dance Tour. In 2018 he was elected as the President of the European Dance Council upon the retirement of the former president Rudolf Trautz.

Marko Ciboci is a founder and organizer of international dance events: ADRIATIC PEARL - Dubrovnik, in Dubrovnik, Croatia, World Pro-Am Superstars, Revelin, Dubrovnik, Croatia, Zagreb Christmas Ball, Zagreb, Croatia, Dubai Royal Pearl, Dubai, UAE, Bangkok Royal Pearl, Bangkok, Thailand, Dance Prestige - Nuit de la Dansa, Paris, France, Adriatic Royal Pearl - Opatija, Croatia.

The Franchise name was changed in 2025 into "The Pearl Events" (www.thePearl.events).

He is also a founder of a Zagreb City Youth Program DANCE AGAINST VIOLENCE.

== Media career ==
=== Dancing with the Stars ===
Marko was one of four judges in TV Reality Show "Dancing with the Stars" in Croatia (Ples sa zvijezdama) in Seasons 10 and 11 broadcast by NOVA TV in 2022 and 2023.
