= Nera Stipičević =

Croatian pop singer and actress (born 1983)

- Born: Nera Stipičević; 21 January 1983 (age 43); Makarska, SR Croatia, SFR Yugoslavia
- Occupations: Stage and film actress, singer
- Years active: 1993–present

Nera Stipičević (born 21 January 1983) is a Croatian pop singer and actress.

Nera Stipičević was born in Makarska, where she attended elementary music school. In 1993 she participated in the children's TV talent show "Turbo Limach Show", by Croatian Radiotelevision. During highschool she was into athletics, and was a member of Croatian national cadet athletic team.

She became known as one of the four last finalists in Story Supernova Music Talents, reality show aired on Nova TV in late 2003. In 2004 she released an album called Nera which was a critical and commercial flop.

She graduated from the University of Zagreb Faculty of Economics in 2007, and in 2010 got a degree in drama at the Academy of Drama Arts in Zagreb. At the Croatian National Theatre in Zagreb, she played a role in their 2007 rendition of The Threepenny Opera by Bertold Brecht, and in their 2008 rendition of They Shoot Horses, Don't They? by Horace McCoy. For the latter role, she was nominated for a best young drama actress award at the Croatian annual drama awards 2009.

At the Croatian National Theatre in Šibenik, she co-wrote the music and acted in their 2008 play "Fantazija" by Marijana Nola, for which she was nominated for the best young operetta/musical actress award at the Croatian annual drama awards in 2008.

In 2010, she won Ples sa zvijezdama, the Croatian version of Dancing with the Stars. In the same year, she made her film debut in the Croatian movie of the omnibus Some Other Stories.

In 2015, she created a multiartistic project FreeDA dedicated to Mexican artist Frida Kahlo.

== Performances ==
Title	Year	Role	Notes
Kosa	2003	Choir singer	Musical (Komedija)
Euridiče	2006	Venus	57th Dubrovnik Summer Festival opening
Dum Marinu u pohode	2007	Multiple roles	58th Dubrovnik Summer Festival
The Threepenny Opera	2007	Dolly	Musical (Croatian National Theatre in Zagreb)
Fantazija	2008	Anka Prpalo	Musical (Croatian National Theatre in Šibenik)
They Shoot Horses, Don't They?	2009	Lily Bacon	Drama (Croatian National Theatre in Zagreb)
Krava Ružica	2009	Multiple roles	Children's play (Mala Scena)
Bjesovi	2010	Student	Drama (Croatian National Theatre in Zagreb)
Šeherezada	2010	Presenter/actress	Symphonic suite (Vatroslav Lisinski Concert Hall)
O medvjedima i ljudima	2010	Marijana	Comedy (Kerempuh)
Snowwhite	2010	Snowwhite	Comedy (Trešnja)
Zagorka	2011	Multiple roles	Drama (Croatian National Theatre in Zagreb)
Miffy	2011	Miffy	Comedy (Trešnja)
War and Peace	2011	Sofia Alexandrovna (Sonya) Rostova	Drama (Croatian National Theatre in Zagreb)
Indijanci	2012	Milica	Musical (Teatar EXIT)
The Princess and the Frog	2012	Princess Isabella	Fairytale (Trešnja)
Nemirne noge	2012	Prostitute	(Teatar EXIT)
Postolar i vrag	2016	Plamenka	Fairytale (Trešnja)

== Filmography ==
Title	Year	Role	Notes
Pandemija	2009		Short satiric movie
Dirty Little Bubbles	2009	Nurse/lover	Award winning short movie
Some Other Stories	2010	Sonja	Award winning omnibus
Nick	2012	Joe's wife	Art movie

== Discography ==
Title	Year
Nera	2004

Preceded by Franka Batelić & Ištvan Varga	Ples sa zvijezdama winner Season 5 (2010 with Damir Horvatinčić)	Succeeded by TBA
