= Nika Fleiss =

Croatian alpine skier (born 1984)

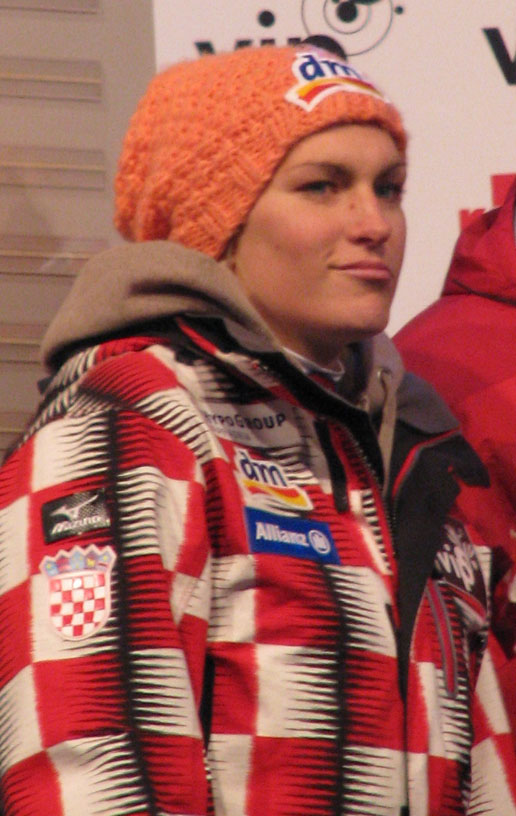
- Nika Fleiss

Medal record

Women's alpine skiing

Representing Croatia

Junior World Ski Championships
Silver medal – second place	2004 Maribor	Slalom

Nika Fleiss (born 14 December 1984) is a Croatian former alpine skier.

Fleiss was born in Brežice, at the time SR Slovenia, SFR Yugoslavia. She lives in Samobor. Having started skiing at the age of 3, her best results were in slalom.

After several successful races in junior category, her first World Cup race was 27 October 2002 in Sölden. Fleiss represented Croatia in 2002, 2006 and 2010 Winter Olympics.

Her best World Cup result is 6th place in Lenzerheide (slalom) in 2005. She missed 2006/07 season because of injury. After the 2009/10 season she retired from the sport.

In 2021, Fleiss ran as a non-partisan (but on the Croatian Democratic Union list) candidate for mayor of Samobor, but lost to Petra Škrobot.
