= Martina Tomčić =

Croatian mezzo-soprano opera singer (born 1975)

- Born: 6 May 1975 (age 51); Umag, SR Croatia, SFR Yugoslavia
- Other name: Martina Tomčić Moskaljov
- Occupation: Opera singer
- Spouse: Ženja Moskaljov (m. 2003)
- Children: 2
- Parents: Zlatko Tomčić (father); Slavica Tomčić (mother)

Martina Tomčić (born 6 May 1975) is a Croatian mezzo-soprano opera singer, who is currently a judge on Nova TV's talent show Supertalent.

== Early life ==
Tomčić was born in Umag to Zlatko Tomčić, a politician who served as acting President of Croatia in February 2000 and Speaker of the Croatian Parliament. She graduated from the High Music School in Graz. In 1995, she won the international singing competition Ferruccio Tagliavini.

== Career ==
Tomčić debuted her role as Orlofsky in The Bat in Graz in 1995, an operetta composed by Johann Strauss.

In November 2001, she performed in Zagreb as Preziosilla in the opera La forza del destino and in Osijek as Carmen in the eponymous opera.

In 2011, Tomčić competed in the sixth season of Ples sa zvijezdama, the Croatian edition of Strictly Come Dancing. She and her professional partner Marko Herceg placed third out of eight couples, having been eliminated before the season's finale. Since 2014, she has occasionally served as a vocal coach to contestants of Tvoje lice zvuči poznato. Since 2016, she has been a permanent judge in Supertalent – the Croatian version of reality show franchise Got Talent – which aired on Nova TV.

== Personal life ==
Tomčić has been married since 2003 and has two children.

== Filmography ==
=== Television ===
Year	Title	Role	Notes
2007–2014	Zvijezde pjevaju	Herself	Main judge
2011	Ples sa zvijezdama	Herself	Season 6 contestant, 3rd place
2014–present	Tvoje lice zvuči poznato	Herself	Vocal coach
2016–present	Supertalent	Herself	Main judge
