= Marko Tolja =

Croatian singer (born 1984)

- Born: 3 July 1984 (age 42); Rijeka, SR Croatia, SFR Yugoslavia (today Croatia)
- Genres: Pop
- Occupations: Singer; songwriter
- Years active: 2006–present
- Label: Aquarius

Marko Tolja (born 3 July 1984) is a Croatian singer.

== Career ==
=== 1984–2005: Early life and education ===
Marko Tolja was born on 3 July 1984 in Rijeka to Koraljka and Darko Tolja. Tolja gained his first musical experiences with his uncle Davor, who sang in the Croatian electropop group Denis & Denis. In 1995, in a duet with Lena Stojiljković, he performed at the children's festival Mikić (a children's version of the festival Melodije Istre i Kvarnera) and won the first place with the composition "Ča smo mi". During his primary school years, he also attended the Ivan Matetić Ronjgov Music School in Rijeka. During those years he performs at numerous matinees and piano recitals. From 2001 to 2006, he sang in various klapas (Klapa Luka, Klapa Volosko, Klapa Fortunal) with which he performed throughout Croatia at various klapa festivals.

=== 2006–2008: Career beginnings ===
In early 2006, Tolja started working on solo career with Rijeka-based music producer Olja Dešić. His debut single "Partila je mala" was released in the summer of 2006 and competing at the 36th edition of the Melodije Istre i Kvarnera festival. "Deja Vu" was released as his second single in early and performed at Dora 2007, Croatia's national selection show to select the country's Eurovision Song Contest 2007 entry. Shortly after Dora 2007 he signed a record deal with Aquarius Records and released his debut studio album Stare dobre stvari. For the 2008 edition of the Porin Award he was nominated and won in the Best New Artist category.

=== 2009–2010: Zvijezde pjevaju and Vrijeme briše istinu ===
In 2009 he appears as a competitor in the third season of Zvijezde pjevaju, the local version of the Just the Two of US series. His partner in the show was Croatian actress Kristina Krepela and they were eliminated in the semi-finals. His second studio album Vrijeme briše istinu was released on 1 May 2009. In the same year Tolja tried to represent Croatia at the Eurovision Song Contest 2009 but failed to reach the final of Dora 2009 with his song "Stranci".

=== 2011–2015: Ljubav u boji and Srca otvorena ===
At the 2010 edition of the Porin Award, Tolja wins his second award in the Best Male Vocal Performance category. In 2010 with Tamara Loos he appears again in the show Zvijezde pjevaju where they win the second prize and in 2011 with his partner Nataša Janjić. At the end of 2011 he appears on the show Ples sa zvijezdama, the Croatian version of Dancing with the Stars and wins it with his dance partner Ana Herceg. On 11 October 2012 Tolja's third studio album Ljubav u boji was released. His first children's album Srca otvorena was released in 2014 and was nominated for a Porin award in the category Best Children's Album in 2015.

=== 2016–present: Tišina ===
On 16 November 2018 Tolja released his fifth studio album Tišina. The album contains the song of the same name which became hit first top 20 by peaking at number 15 on the HR Top 40 chart. A year later, in 2019, Tolja released a collaboration with Mia Dimšić titled "Sva blaga ovog svijeta". The song peaked at number one on the Croatian airplay chart and became Tolja's first song to do so. In 2020 he score another chart topper with "Od Božića do Božića", a duet with Tonči Huljić.

== Discography ==
=== Albums ===
- Stare dobre stvari (2007)
- Vrijeme briše istinu (2009)
- Ljubav u boji (2012)
- Srca otvorena (2014)
- Tišina (2018)

=== Singles ===
Title	Year	Peak chart positions	Album
Title	Year	CRO	Album
"Bilo bi bolje"	2016	33	Tišina
"Tišina"	2018	15	Tišina
"Zaplesale su sjene"	2018	17	Tišina
"Sve što nisam ja"	2019	10	Non-album singles
"Sva blaga ovog svijeta" (with Mia Dimšić)	2019	1	Non-album singles
"Još jedan dan"	2019	15	Non-album singles
"O tebi ovisan"	2020	3	Non-album singles
"Od Božića do Božića" (with Tonči Huljić)	2020	1	Non-album singles
"Budi budna"	2021	14	Non-album singles
"Nismo znali bolje"	2023	2	Non-album singles
"—" denotes releases that did not chart or were not released in that territory.
