= Sandi Cenov =

Croatian singer (born 1968)

- Born: Aleksandar Cenov; 17 July 1968 (age 58); Rijeka, SR Croatia, SFR Yugoslavia
- Occupation: Singer
- Years active: 1992–present
- Spouses: Branka Bebić (divorced); Ilina Ilić (m. 2006)
- Children: 2

Aleksandar "Sandi" Cenov (born 17 July 1968), also known simply as Sandi, is Croatian pop singer who was popular in the 1990s. His first album was released in 1992.

In the 2005 elections for Zagreb City Assembly he was one of the candidates on the list of Tatjana Holjevac.

He is signed with the record label Hayat Production.

In December 2020, Cenov was announced as one of the 14 finalists for Dora 2021, the national contest in Croatia to select the country's Eurovision Song Contest 2021 entry. He performed the song "Kriv" ("Guilty"), which was written by Siniša "Simba" Reljić and Faruk "Fayo" Buljubašić, and finished last with 12 points.
