= Franka Batelić =

Croatian pop singer and songwriter

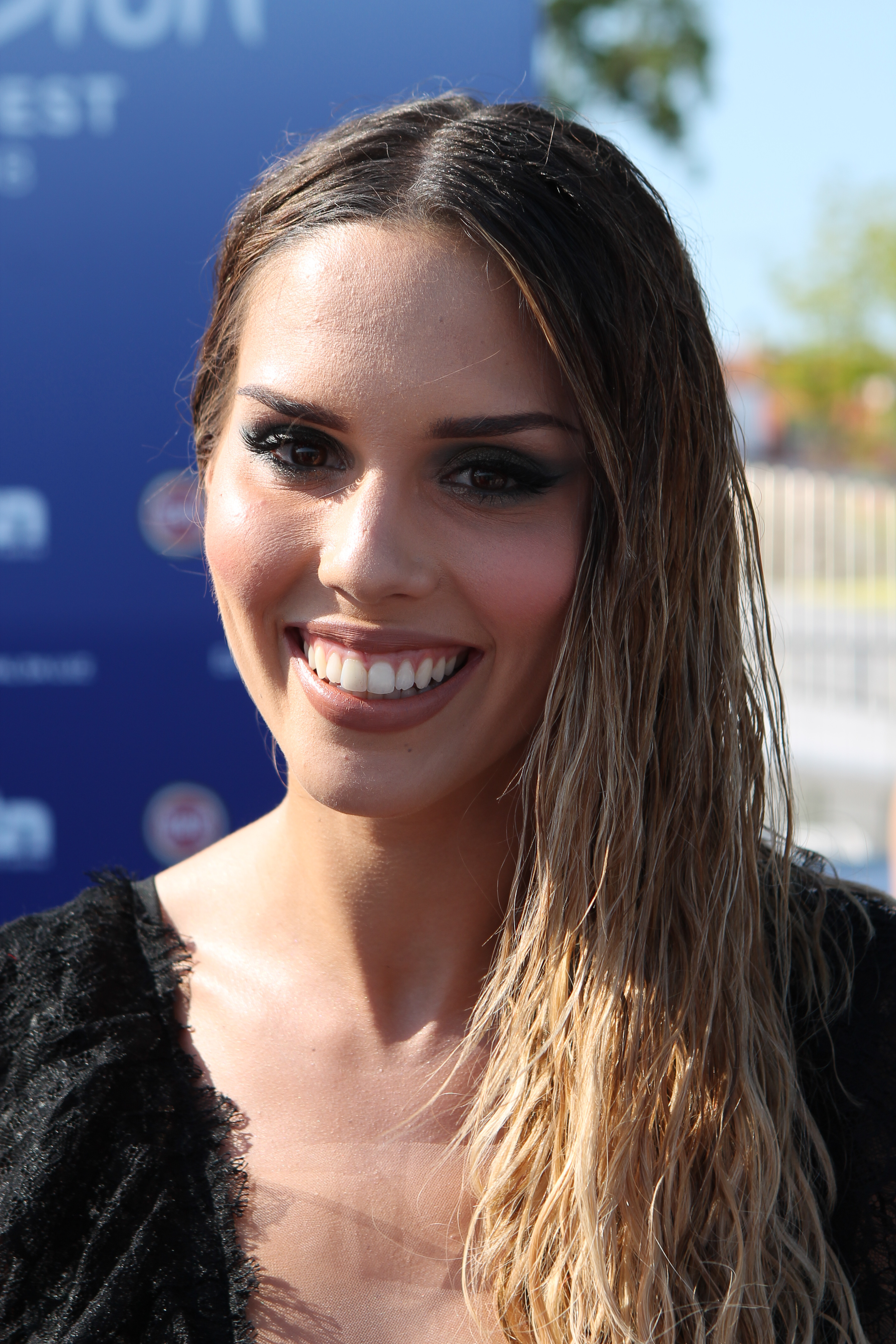
- Batelić in 2018

Background information
- Born: 7 June 1992 (age 34); Rijeka, Croatia
- Years active: 2007–present
- Labels: Hit Records; Karpo Media; Bez komentara; Croatia Records
- Website: franka.com.hr

Franka Batelić (born 7 June 1992), also known as Franka, is a Croatian singer-songwriter. She rose to fame as the winner of the first season of Showtime. Batelić represented Croatia in the Eurovision Song Contest 2018 with the song "Crazy".

== Life and career ==
=== 1992–2006: Early life and education ===
Franka Batelić was born on 7 June 1992 in Rijeka. She has a younger brother Nikola who is the singer and guitarist of the Labin-based band "Storm". She began singing at the age of three, initially as a soloist with the Minicantanti choir and also sang in the church choir of St. Andrew Catholic parish in Rabac.

After finishing elementary and high school in her hometown, Batelić spent two semesters at the Berklee College of Music, and later enrolled at the Zagreb School of Law.

=== 2007: Career beginnings ===
Batelić participated in auditions for the first season of Showtime in 2007, singing "Come saprei" by Giorgia for judges Jacques Houdek, Ivana Husar, and Boris Banović. Batelić won the competition on 22 December 2007 by receiving the highest number of cast televotes in the finals. As a prize, she signed a recording contract with the Hit Records record label. Batelić's winner single "Ovaj dan" was released officially on 14 November 2007.

=== 2008–2013: Breakthrough and continued success ===
Batelić's second single, "Ruža u kamenu" – produced and written by Miro Buljan, Boris Đurđević, and Neno Ninčević – was released in May 2008 in Croatia. It was performed at the "12th Croatian Radio Festival" in Opatija where it won the Public's Award in the Pop/Rock category by receiving the most televotes. Later that year, "Ruža u kamenu" was chosen to represent Croatia at the 2008 OGAE Song Contest, an audio event organised by a network of 42 Eurovision Song Contest fan clubs. She won the contest.

"Pjesma za kraj" was released as Batelić's third single in January 2009. The song was recorded for the Croatian selection for the Eurovision Song Contest 2009 where it finished seventh with a total of 18 points. In December 2009, Batelić and her dance partner Ištvan Varga won the 4th season of Ples sa zvijezdama, the Croatian version of Dancing with the Stars.

In April 2013, Batelić was the opening act on the Beyoncé's concert at the Arena Zagreb, performing in front of 18,000 people. In November 2013, Batelić released the single "Ljubav je" whose lyrics were signed by one of the most performed and awarded Croatian pop musician-songwriter Antonija Šola. "Ljubav je" was the first Franka's single to appear on the Croatian national HR Top40 list.

=== 2017–2018: Comeback, Eurovision Song Contest 2018 and S tobom ===
On 27 November 2017, Batelić confirmed via social media that she will release her comeback single "S tobom" on 4 December 2017. The song was first played on Nives Čanović's 385 Show on Narodni radio on 4 December with Batelić interviewed live. The accompanying music video for the song was directed by Sandra Mihaljević and Igor Ivanović and premiered on RTL Televizija's HR Top show on 10 December 2017. It was announced on 13 February 2018 that Batelić would represent Croatia in the Eurovision Song Contest 2018 with the song "Crazy". She came in 17th in the first semi-final, thus not qualifying for the grand finale.

Batelić's debut studio album S tobom was released on 6 December 2018 and peaked at number 19 on the Top of the Shops albums chart in Croatia. The album's third single, "Kao ti i ja", was released in June. Its fourth single "Ti mi nosiš sreću" was released in October, while the fifth single "Tajno" was released in December.

=== 2019–present: Second studio album ===
On 17 June 2019, Betelić released "Ljubav, ništa više" as the first single from her then-upcoming second studio album. In October "Sve dok sanjaš" was released as the album's second single. "Sve dok sanjaš" debuted at number two on the HR Top 40, eventually peaking at number one, becoming Batelić's first chart topping single in Croatia. She performed the song at the 2020 Cesarica Awards and won the "Song of the Year" award with it.

On 7 July 2023, Batalić released the single "Putuj s poljupcima".

== Activism ==
Batelić is an LGBT rights advocate, and an animal rights activist. She was the face of the Croatian 2009 "Animal's Friend" campaign.

== Personal life ==
On 21 July 2018, Batelić married her long-time boyfriend, footballer Vedran Ćorluka. In August 2019, the couple announced that they were expecting their first child. The couple has two children together, born in January 2020 and November 2022.

== Discography ==
=== Studio albums ===
- S tobom (2018)

== Awards and nominations ==
| Year | Association | Category | Nominee / work | Result | Ref. |
|---|---|---|---|---|---|
| 2008 | 12th Croatian Radio Festival | Public's Choice | Ruža u kamenu | Won | |
| 2009 | HR Top 20 | New Artist of the Year | Franka Batelić | Won | |
| 2009 | Porin | Best New Artist | Franka Batelić | Nominated | |
| 2010 | Zlatna koogla | Best Female Singer | Franka Batelić | Nominated | |
| 2010 | Zlatna koogla | Best Music Video | Možda volim te | Nominated | |
| 2018 | Cesarica | Song of the Year | S tobom | Nominated | |
| 2018 | Cesarica | Song of the Year | Kao ti i ja | Nominated | |
| 2019 | Cesarica | Song of the Year | Ljubav, ništa više | Nominated | |
| 2019 | Cesarica | Song of the Year | Sve dok sanjaš | Won | |
| 2019 | Cesarica | Pop Hit of the Year | Sve dok sanjaš | Won | |
| 2019 | 2nd Music Awards Ceremony | Music Video of the Year | Ljubav, ništa više | Nominated | |
| 2019 | TOP.HR Music Awards | Female Artist of the Year | Franka Batelić | Won | |
| 2020 | Cesarica | Song of the Year | "Prvi osjećaj" | Nominated | |

Achievements
| Preceded by Mario Valentić & Ana Herceg | Ples sa zvijezdama winner Season 4 (2009 with Ištvan Varga) | Succeeded by Nera Stipičević & Damir Horvatinčić |
| Preceded by Jacques Houdek with "My Friend" | Croatia in the Eurovision Song Contest; 2018 | Succeeded by Roko Blažević with "The Dream" |
