= Barbara Kolar =

Croatian television presenter

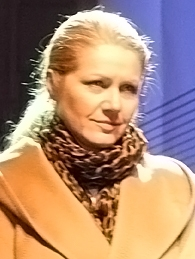
- Kolar in January 2012
- Born: 18 April 1970 (age 55); Čakovec, SR Croatia, SFR Yugoslavia (now Croatia)
- Occupations: Actress; television presenter; radio presenter
- Television: Croatian Radiotelevision (HRT)

Barbara Kolar (born 18 April 1970) is a Croatian actress, television presenter at the Croatian Radiotelevision and the radio presenter at Antena Zagreb. She is the most famous for hosting the Ples sa zvijezdama (English: Dancing with the Stars) and Zvijezde pjevaju (English: Just the Two of Us) shows. She hosts Antena Zagreb's Jutarnji Show ("Morning Show"). She starred in the HRT series Bitange i princeze ("Punks and princesses"), Stipe u gostima ("Stipe's visit") and Naša mala klinika ("Our little clinic"), and is the host of the quiz show Upitnik ("Questionnaire").

== TV appearances ==
=== Series roles ===
- Bitange i princeze as police officer (2009)
- Stipe u gostima as herself (2009)
- Naša mala klinika as herself (2007)

=== Hostings ===
- Život je lijep (2015–2016)
- Ja to mogu (2015)
- 30 u hladu (2009)
- Malo misto (2005–present)
- Kruške i jabuke (2000)
