= Duško Ćurlić =

Croatian actor and radio host

Duško Ćurlić (born 28 January 1968) is a Croatian actor and radio host for Croatian Radiotelevision (HRT).

Born in Zagreb, Ćurlić is best known for hosting the Croatian TV shows Ples sa zvijezdama, Zvijezde pjevaju and Kruške i jabuke. His roles in film and television include Bitange i princeze, Ljubav u zaleđu, Ne pitaj kako! and Iza stakla.

Ćurlić began his career as a radio host on Radio 101, hosting some of the most popular radio shows: Parlament show and Intervju tjedna.

He acts as a standard host of Dora—the Croatian pre-selection for the Eurovision Song Contest—as well as a commentator of the contest for HRT.

== TV appearances ==
=== Series roles ===
- "Bitange i princeze" as prisoner/speaker (2005–2008)
- "Ljubav u zaleđu"

=== Movie roles ===
- Iza stakla (2008)
- Ne pitaj kako! (2006)

=== Hostings ===
- Do posljednjeg zbora (2012)
- Zvijezde pjevaju (2007–present)
- Ples sa zvijezdama (2006–2013 2025-present)
- Dora (2006–2010; 2019–present)
- Kruške i jabuke (1999–2002)
- Parliament show
- Intervju tjedna
