= 2010s in Croatian television =

This is a list of Croatian television related events from the 2000s.

== Events ==
=== 2010 ===
- 4 June – 16-year-old Kim Verson wins the second season of Hrvatska traži zvijezdu.
- 17 December – 21-year-old singer Viktorija Novosel wins the second season of Supertalent.
- 18 December – Singer and actress Nera Stipičević and her partner Damir Horvatinčić win the fifth season of Ples sa zvijezdama.

=== 2011 ===
- 13 March – Croatia debuted on Veliki brat. It was aired on RTL.
- 17 June – Goran Kos wins the third and final season of Hrvatska traži zvijezdu.
- 27 June – Marijana Čvrljak wins the fourth and final season of Veliki brat for Croatia, becoming the show's first and only female winner.
- 17 December – Singer Marko Tolja and his partner Ana Herceg win the sixth season of Ples sa zvijezdama.
- 18 December – Shadow theatre company Promenada Klub win the third and final season of Supertalent.

=== 2012 ===
- 22 December –Video-kiosk host Barbara Radulović and her partner Robert Schubert win the seventh season of Ples sa zvijezdama.

=== 2013 ===
- 6 May - Žarko Stojanović from Serbia, a housemate on the fifth season of the French version of Big Brother Secret Story wins the fifth and final season of Veliki brat.
- 21 December - Mamutica actor Mislav Čavajda and his partner Petra Jeričević win the eighth and final season of Ples sa zvijezdama.

=== 2015 ===
- 22 March – X Factor Adria debuts in Croatia, airing on RTL.
- 25 April - Nina Kraljić wins the first season of The Voice – Najljepši glas Hrvatske.
- 21 June - Amel Ćurić from Bosnia and Herzegovina wins the second season of X Factor Adria.
- 12 December - Darko Petkovski from Macedonia wins the fifth season of Veliki brat.

=== 2016 ===
- 23 April - Ruža Janjiš wins the second season of The Voice – Najljepši glas Hrvatske.
- 3 June - Romano Obilinović wins the sixth season of Big Brother.

== Debuts ==
=== 2010 ===
- Klasik TV channel launches

=== 2011 ===
==== Channels ====
- 2 January – Doma TV
- 11 April – GP1
- December – Nickelodeon

==== Shows ====
- 13 March – Veliki brat (2011–2013, 2015–present)

=== 2012 ===
- 12 March – Survivor Srbija VIP: Costa Rica on RTL Televizija
- 5 September – Horizonti on HRT 1
- 2 October – Paravan on HRT 1

=== 2015 ===
==== Channels ====
- 24 December – Laudato TV

==== Shows ====
- 17 January – The Voice – Najljepši glas Hrvatske (2015–present)
- 22 March – X Factor Adria (2015–present)
- 4 September - Veliki brat (2011-2013, 2015–present)

=== 2016 ===
==== Channels ====
- 11 July - RTL Croatia World

==== Shows ====
- 17 April - Big Brother (2004-2008, 2016–present)

== Endings ==
=== 2011 ===
- Hrvatska traži zvijezdu (2009–2011)
- Supertalent (2009–2011, 2016–present)

=== 2012 ===
- 2 June – Survivor Srbija VIP: Costa Rica on RTL Televizija
- 30 December – Red Carpet on Nova TV

=== 2013 ===
- Ples sa zvijezdama (2006-2013)
- Veliki brat (2011-2013, 2015–present)

== Deaths ==
=== 2012 ===
- 14 February – Zlatko Crnković: actor
- 27 February – Helga Vlahović: television and radio journalist, producer

=== 2013 ===
- 23 October – Dolores Lambaša: actress
