= 2010 in Croatian television =

This is a list of Croatian television related events from 2010.

== Events ==
- 4 June – 16-year-old Kim Verson wins the second season of Hrvatska traži zvijezdu.
- 17 December – 21-year-old singer Viktorija Novosel wins the second season of Supertalent.
- 18 December – Singer and actress Nera Stipičević and her partner Damir Horvatinčić win the fifth season of Ples sa zvijezdama.
- Unknown – Klasik TV channel launches.

== Television shows ==
=== 2000s ===
- Ples sa zvijezdama (2006–2013)
- Hrvatska traži zvijezdu (2009–2011)
- Supertalent (2009–2011, 2016–present)
