= Big Brother (Croatian TV series) =

- Logo of the seventh season
- Also known as: Big Brother Hrvatska
- Based on: Big Brother by John de Mol Jr.
- Presented by: Antonija Blaće (2–5; 7); Marijana Batinić (6); Daria Knez (1)
- No. of seasons: 10

Production
- Production location: Zagreb
- Production company: Endemol

Original release
- Network: RTL Televizija
- Release: 18 September 2004 – 6 May 2018

Big Brother is the Croatian version of the international reality television franchise Big Brother created by producer John de Mol Jr. in 1997. The show was aired on RTL Televizija. It followed a number of contestants who live in an isolated house trying to avoid being evicted by the public with the aim of winning a large cash prize at the end of the run. Throughout the season, housemates are completing tasks, every incomplete task reduces the prize.

In the first four regular seasons and the celebrity season, the house was located in Jadran Film studios, in Dubrava, Zagreb. In the fifth season, the house used is the Big Brother Thailand house.

There have been seven regular seasons and one celebrity season. Big Brother holds the record for having the most regular seasons with only male contestants winning the show each year (although the celebrity edition was won by a woman).

== Series details ==
=== Original seasons ===
Series	Theme	Day	Housemates	Winner	Runner-up	Presenter(s)	Episodes	Originally released			Prize
Series	Theme	Day	Housemates	Winner	Runner-up	Presenter(s)	Episodes	First released	Last released	Network	Prize
1	Vidi sve (Sees everything)	100	14	Saša Tkalčević	Zdravko Lamot	Daria Knez	—N/a	18 September 2004	26 December 2004	RTL	1,000,000 kn
2	Gola istina (Naked truth)	118	21	Hamdija Seferović	Daca Bosančić	Antonija Blaće	—N/a	4 September 2005	30 December 2005	RTL	1,000,000 kn
3	Do kraja (To the end)	99	14	Danijel Rimanić	Tomislav Šimićević	Antonija Blaće	—N/a	8 September 2006	15 December 2006	RTL	1,250,000 kn
4	Bez milosti! (No mercy!)	99	14	Vedran Lovrenčić	Maja-Paola Sestrić	Antonija Blaće	—N/a	7 September 2007	21 December 2007	RTL	1,005,000 kn
5	Avantura te zove! (Adventure calls you!)	106	18	Krešimir Duvančić	Ornela Bešker-Amulić	Antonija Blaće	—N/a	5 September 2008	19 December 2008	RTL	1,135,000 kn
6	Tko će u raj? (Who is going to heaven?)	50	15	Romano Obilinović	Ines Huskić	Marijana Batinić	—N/a	17 April 2016	3 June 2016	RTL	116,300 kn
7	Tajne i laži (Secrets and Lies)	100	31	Antonio Orač	Lucija Stojak	Antonija Blaće	—N/a	27 January 2018	6 May 2018	RTL	371,000 kn

=== Celebrity season ===
In 2008, RTL Televizija launched a special celebrity season of Big Brother. Celebrities entered the house for charity. However, due to low ratings, the celebrity season was ended one week before it planned.

Series	Day	Housemates	Winner	Runner-up	Presenter(s)	Episodes	Originally released			Prize
Series	Day	Housemates	Winner	Runner-up	Presenter(s)	Episodes	First released	Last released	Network	Prize
Celebrity	15	8	Danijela Dvornik	Marina Orsag	Antonija Blaće	—N/a	7 March 2008	21 March 2008	RTL	100,000 kn

=== Regional seasons ===
In 2011, Big Brother Croatia joins the regional version of Big Brother — Veliki Brat. The show features contestants from Croatia, Macedonia, Serbia, Montenegro and Bosnia and Herzegovina.

Series	Theme	Day	Housemates	Winner	Runner-up	Presenter(s)	Episodes	Originally released			Prize
Series	Theme	Day	Housemates	Winner	Runner-up	Presenter(s)	Episodes	First released	Last released	Network	Prize
Veliki Brat 2011	Ljubi bližnjeg svog (Love Thy Neighbor)	106	21	Marijana Čvrljak	Duško Bogdanović	Marijana Mićić; Antonija Blaće	—N/a	13 March 2011	27 June 2011	RTL	€104,700
Veliki Brat 2015	Gleda te, zove te Veliki Brat (He's watching you, called this Big Brother)	100	20	Darko "Spejko" Petkovski	Goran Todić	Antonija Blaće; Sky Wikluh	—N/a	4 September 2015	12 December 2015	RTL	€95,665
