= Bojan Jambrošić =

- Birth name: Bojan Jambrošić
- Born: 28 September 1985 (age 39); Čakovec, SFR Yugoslavia
- Origin: Čakovec, Croatia
- Genres: Pop, Rock
- Occupation: Singer
- Instrument: Vocals
- Years active: 2009–present
- Labels: Dallas Records
- Website: www.bojanjambrosic.com

Bojan Jambrošić (born 28 September 1985, in Čakovec, SFR Yugoslavia), is a Croatian pop singer who in 2009 won the first season of talent show Hrvatska traži zvijezdu, the Croatian version of Idol series. After his win, he was signed to Dallas Records. The same year, he released his debut album Bolji od ljubavi. He also took part in season 5 of Ples sa zvijezdama, the Croatian version of Dancing with the Stars aired on HRT1. His partner was Martina Bastić. They finished third overall out of eight dancing couples. He sang the theme song for TV series Ruža vjetrova, until the show stopped using it in the 160th episode of season 1.

== Beginnings ==
Bojan Jambrošić started to sing while just 10 years old at a children's festival in his hometown Čakovec, later singing at music competitions like MEF (Čakovec), Darfest (Daruvar), Bonofest (Vukovar), Centrum Mundi (Ludbreg) and others. Then he joined a pop rock band composition Larva, that gained some fame through the song "Nebo", winning a music competition. His music genres included pop, rock, spiritual music and even opera (notably singing with Evelin Novak).

== Hrvatska traži zvijezdu ==
Bojan Jambrošić auditioned for Hrvatska traži zvijezdu (the Croatian Idol) in Zagreb, and was one of 100 candidates chosen and reached the Top 14. In the final he sang "Dužna si" from Jacques Houdek in Croatian, "You Raise Me Up" in English from Josh Groban and the winner song "Ne govori da me znaš" and was declared winner. The final was on 18 June 2009, a closely fought race with the other finalist Zoran Mišić. The margin was minimal as Bojan received 50.1% of the public vote. After win, he was signed with Dallas Records, run by the program jury Goran Lisica-Fox.

== Career after win ==
Immediately after the win, he gave a concert in his hometown Čakovec. In November 2009, Bojan released his first studio album Bolji od ljubavi ("Better than love" in Croatian) which was commercially successful and was awarded with a golden record. His debut single was the winning song "Ne govori da me znaš" ("Don't say that you know me"), followed by "Preko ruba vremena" ("Over the edge of time") and "U našoj maloj sobi" ("In our little room").

Since summer 2010 Bojan is involved in a campaign of Croatian animal friends called "Budite bolji od okrutnosti", which is supporting cosmetics that haven't been tested on animals.

He also sang the theme of Ruža vjetrova ("Windrose"), a 2011 soap opera on Croatian television RTL Televizija that became commercially his most successful single to date.

Bojan has recorded his second album with Ante Pecotić, one of Croatia's leading songwriters and producers. He was attending CMC Festival 2012 with his song "Obećajem" ("I promise") taking place on 15 June 2012 in Vodice.

Since November 2011 Bojan is also playing the role of "Willard" in the Croatian version of Footloose. Furthermore, he took over the role of "Marius" in "Jadnici", the Croatian version of "Les Misérables" with so far two shows in Varaždin (September 2013) and Split (July 2014) along with other Croatian popstars, such as Pamela Ramljak, Kim Verson or Max Hozić.

His second album Zapisano u zvijezdama has been released in August 2013, while the first single release "Na dobroj strani ljubavi" ranked for a couple of weeks among the Top5 of the official Croatian music charts, published by IHG.

In June 2014 returned to "CMC Music Festival" with his song "Obećana ljubav".

== In Ples sa zvijezdama ==
Bojan Jambrošić partnered with Martina Bastić in season five of Ples sa zvijezdama, the Croatian version of Dancing with the Stars. The scores were:

- Day 1 (Cha cha cha): 20 points (of possible 30)
- Day 2 (Quickstep): 26 points (of possible 20)
- Day 3 (Jive): 34 points (of possible 40)
- Day 4 (Paso doble): 31 points (of possible 40)
- Day 5 (Samba / Viennese waltz): 25 + 6 = 31 points
- Quarter finals (Rumba / Tango): 29 + 32 = 61 points
- Semi-finals: 34 + 32 = 64 points (eliminated finished 3rd)

== Discography ==
=== Albums ===
- 2009: Bolji od ljubavi
- 2013: Zapisano U Zvijezdama

=== Singles ===
- 2009: "Ne govori da me znaš"
- 2009: "Preko ruba vremena"
- 2010: "U našoj maloj sobi"
- 2010: "Sasvim sam"
- 2011: "Sve oko nje"
- 2011: "Ruža Vjetrova"
- 2011: "Sretan Božić"
- 2012: "Obećajem"
- 2013: "Na dobroj strani ljubavi"
- 2013: "Hajdemo zajedno"
- 2014: "Obećana ljubav"
