= Star Search Croatia =

- Hrvatska traži zvijezdu
- Genre: Reality competition
- Created by: Simon Fuller
- Based on: Pop Idol by Simon Fuller
- Presented by: Antonija Blaće (2009–10); Ivan Šarić (2011)
- Judges: Tony Cetinski; Goran Lisica-Fox; Ivana Mišerić (2011); Anđa Marić (2010); Jelena Radan (2009–10)
- Country of origin: Croatia
- Original language: Croatian
- No. of seasons: 3

Original release
- Network: RTL Televizija
- Release: 22 February 2009 – 17 June 2011

Related
- Superstar

Star Search Croatia (Croatian: Hrvatska traži zvijezdu, abbreviated as HTZ) is a Croatian singing reality competition television series that served as the second Croatian version of Pop Idol. It ran on RTL Televizija for three seasons from 2009 to 2011.

In an elimination-style format, the series employs a panel of judges who look for a person with the best singing talent. Contestants selected during auditions progress onto live shows, where the winner is decided by televote. The first season was won by Bojan Jambrošić, followed by Kim Verson and Goran Kos winning the second and the third seasons, respectively.

In 2023, RTL rebooted the series under the title Superstar.

== Format ==
The series consist of auditions and live shows. Antonija Blaće, known for participating and hosting the Croatian edition of Big Brother, is the host of the competition, which makes her the first person to host both local versions of these franchises. Due to hosting Big Brother in Spring 2011, she was replaced with Ivan Šarić.

=== Judges ===
In the first season, the competitors were judged by Croatian musicians Tony Cetinski, Jelena Radan and Goran Lisica-Fox. Due to private commitments, Radan left in the beginning of the second season and was replaced by Anđa Marić, who left after the second season and was replaced with Ivana Mišerić in the third season.

Judges on Hrvatska traži zvijezdu
Judge	Season		
Judge	1	2	3
Tony Cetinski	Main	Main	Main
Goran Lisica-Fox	Main	Main	Main
Jelena Radan	Main		
Anđa Marić		Main	
Ivana Mišerić			Main

== Series overview ==
Season	Episodes	Originally released		Winner
Season	Episodes	First released	Last released	Winner
1	18	22 February 2009	19 June 2009	Bojan Jambrošić
2	18	9 February 2010	4 June 2010	Kim Verson
3	17	4 March 2011	17 June 2011	Goran Kos

=== Season 1 (2009) ===
The first season was broadcast from February to June 2009. It was won by Bojan Jambrošić.

HTZ season 1 finalists (with dates of elimination)
Contestant	Result
Bojan Jambrošić	Winner
Zoran Mišić	June 19
Barbara Dautović	June 12
Matej Miličić	June 5
Carla Belovari	May 29
Nikolina Kovačević	May 22
Iva Ušalj	May 15
Duško Šarić	May 8
Sementa Rajhard	May 1
Manuela Svorcan	April 24
Anđela Poljak	April 24

=== Season 2 (2010) ===
the second season was broadcast from April to June 2010, and was won by Kim Verson.

HTZ season 2 finalists (with dates of elimination)
Contestant	Result
Kim Verson	Winner
Vilibald Kovač	June 4
Duje Stanišić	May 28
Juraj Jurlina	May 21
Jurica Gorša	May 14
Maja Malić	May 7
Petar Brkljačić	April 30
Adrijana Baković	April 23
Helena Hunčaga	April 16
Dino Antonić	April 9

=== Season 3 (2011) ===
The third season was broadcast from March to June 2011, and was won by Goran Kos.

HTZ season 3 finalists (with dates of elimination)
Contestant	Result
Goran Kos	Winner
Marcela Oroši	June 17
Mark Marku	June 10
Maja Bajamić	June 3
Taher Sanuri	May 27
Ines Huskić	May 20
Ivan Delić	May 13
Daniel Dizdar	May 13
Romana Pavliša	May 6
Kristian Marolt	April 29

== Superstar ==
In December 2022, RTL announced Superstar, a new Croatian edition of Pop Idol, which serves as a spiritual successor to Hrvatska traži zvijezdu. The series premiered on 23 September 2023 on RTL. Antonija Blaće, who hosted the first two seasons of HTZ, returned as the host for Superstar's live shows.
