= Big Brother (Croatian TV series) season 7 =

Big Brother
- Season 7
- Presented by: Antonija Blaće
- No. of days: 100
- No. of housemates: 31
- Winner: Antonio "Orky" Orač
- Runner-up: Lucija Stojak

Release
- Original network: RTL
- Original release: 27 January – 6 May 2018

Season chronology
- ← Previous; Big Brother 6

Big Brother 2018 is the seventh season of the Big Brother Croatia and ninth season of Big Brother franchise overall to air on RTL. This season premiered on January 27, 2018 on RTL. Antonija Blaće hosting the main shows.

The prize for the winner this season is 371,000 kn.

== Housemates ==
On Day 1, 18 housemates entered the house. Dubravka, Marijan, Matija and Nikola V entered the Secret House. On Day 4, Zebo entered the house. On Day 17, Anči entered the house. On Day 20, Lidija and Ljiljana entered the house. On Day 31, Jure entered the house. On Day 36, 6 more housemates entered the house. On Day 47 Petar entered the house. On Day 50 Ante entered the house.

Name	Age on entry	Occupation	Residence
Aleksandar Neradin	32	Gravedigger	Makarska
Alena "Anezi" Nezirević	31	Singer / Administrative lawyer	Vrsar/Banja Luka
Ana "Anči" Kovačec	24	Commercial Officer	Zagreb
Ana "Krištofka" Krištof	33	Cosmetic Promoter	Zagreb
Ana Marković	27	Waitress	Bjelovar
Ana-Marija Brdek	30	Clothes Designer	Velika Gorica
Ante Biuk	40	Restorer	Donje Ogorje
Antonija Ćatipović	32	Saleswoman	Zagreb
Antonio Benček	21	Civil Engineer	Križevci
Antonio "Orky" Orač	24	Waiter	Bjelovar
Bojan Mrđenović	34	Waiter	Sisak
Bojana Lončarević	47	Cook	Rijeka
Daniel "Zebo" Tomić	24	Economist	Slavonski Brod
Dubravka Ujević Veron	46	Traffic engineer	Zagreb
Juraj Golubiček	28	Architect	Zagreb
Jure Kelava	66	Retired	Omiš
Karla Jakelić	19	Student	Split
Lidija Marić	45	Waitress	Garešnica
Ljiljana Lipovac	61	Hairdresser	Zagreb
Luciano Plazibat	19	Student	Solin
Lucija Stojak	23	Caterer	Split
Luka Rok Medunović	23	Chef	Zagreb
Marijan Lisak	48	Retired	Zadar
Marin Novaković	22	Administrative Officer	Omiš
Matija Štainer	24	Worker	Osijek
Nikita Dajčer	28	Beautician	Lovran
Nikola Bogo Sedlar	23	Commercial	Split
Nikola Vidović	21	Chef / Rapper	Sombor/Beli Manastir
Petar Stipetić	49	Butcher	Trilj
Renata Nemeček	30	Former soldier	Čaglin
Tomislav Roso	25	Hotel and tourist technician	Kaštel Novi

== Nominations table ==
The first housemate in each box was nominated for two points, and the second housemate was nominated for one point.

	Week 1	Week 2	Week 3		Week 4	Week 5	Week 6	Week 7		Week 8		Week 10		Week 11	Week 12	Week 13		Week 14		
	Week 1	Week 2	Day 18	Day 22	Week 4	Week 5	Week 6	Day 43	Day 44	Day 50	Day 57	Day 64	Day 71	Week 11	Week 12	Day 85	Day 91	Day 98	Final	
Orky	No; Nominations	Antonio; Bojana	Bojan; Lucija	No; Nominations	Nikola V Matija	Tomislav to save	Dubravka; Ljiljana	Dubravka	Anči; Antonio	Ana to save	No; Nominations	Tomislav; Ana	Karla; Antonio	Ribica; Antonio	Exempt	Anezi; Bogo	Anezi	No; Nominations	Winner (Day 100)	
Lucija	No; Nominations	Bojan; Renata	Bojan; Luka Rok	No; Nominations	Anezi; Bojan	Lidija to save	Bojan; Anezi	Bojan	Banned	Orky to save	No; Nominations	Antonio; Ana	Not; Eligible	Banned	Antonio; Orky	Anezi; Bogo	No; Nominations	No; Nominations	Runner-Up (Day 100)	
Anezi	No; Nominations	Tomislav; Juraj	Bojan; Lucija	No; Nominations	Lucija; Matija	Exempt	Lucija; Lidija	Anči	Anči; Ana	BB-elite	No; Nominations	Bogo; Ribica	Lucija; Marin	Ana-Marija; Marin	Exempt	Lucija; Tomislav	No; Nominations	No; Nominations	Third Place (Day 100)	
Antonio	No; Nominations	Bojan; Luka Rok	Luka Rok; Lucija	No; Nominations	Matija; Bojan	Exempt	Bojan; Dubravka	Luka Rok	Anči; Ana	BB-elite	No; Nominations	Lucija; Bogo	Ana; Karla	Marin; Ribica	Lucija; Anezi	Marin; Ana	Marin	No; Nominations	Fourth place (Day 100)	
Ana	No; Nominations	Zebo; Anezi	Anezi; Zebo	No; Nominations	Matija; Anezi	Lidija to save	Anezi; Ljiljana	Anezi	Anezi; Antonio	Orky to save	No; Nominations	Lucija; Tomislav	Antonio; Karla	Antonio; Ana-Marija	Nominated	Anezi; Bogo	No; Nominations	No; Nominations	Fifth place (Day 100)	
Bojan	No; Nominations	Antonio; Nikita	Bojana; Lucija	No; Nominations	Nikola V Luka Rok	Exempt	Dubravka; Ljiljana	Anči	Ribica; Anči	BB-elite	No; Nominations	Tomislav; Orky	Antonio; Anezi	Bogo; Marijan	Nominated	Lucija; Bogo	Lucija	No; Nominations	Evicted (Day 98)	
Marin	Not in House						In Secret; House		Ribica; Anči	Ana-Marija to save	No; Nominations	Ana-Marija; Karla	Anezi; Bogo	Antonio; Anezi	Nominated	Anezi; Bogo	No; Nominations	No; Nominations	Re-Evicted (Day 98)	
Tomislav	No; Nominations	Bojana; Luka Rok	Bojana; Luka Rok	No; Nominations	Nikola V Anezi	Ana to save	In Secret; House		Ribica; Anči	BB-elite	No; Nominations	Orky; Ana	Not; Eligible	Marijan; Ribica	Nominated	Anezi; Bogo	No; Nominations	No; Nominations	Evicted (Day 98)	
Lidija (Ribica)	Not in House				Bojan; Matija	Lucija to save	Anezi; Ljiljana	Bojan	Luka Rok; Antonio	Luciano to save	No; Nominations	Lucija; Marin	Orky; Antonio	Antonio; Marijan	Nominated	Tomislav; Lucija	Tomislav	Walked (Day 93)		
Nikola S (Bogo)	Not in House						In Secret; House	Not; Eligible	Not; Eligible	BB-elite	No; Nominations	Anezi; Antonio	Lucija; Ana	Marin; Marijan	Nominated	Lucija; Ana	Evicted (Day 90)			
Ana-Marija	Not in House						In Secret; House		Ribica; Anči	Marin to save	No; Nominations	Ribica; Marin	Anezi; Lucija	Marijan; Ribica	Nominated	Evicted (Day 85)				
Marijan	In Secret; House	Bojan; Nikita	Renata; Orky	No; Nominations	Nikola V Luka Rok	Exempt	Dubravka; Bojan	Luciano	Ana; Antonio	BB-elite	No; Nominations	Ana; Antonio	Marin; Karla	Antonio; Marin	Evicted (Day 78)					
Karla	Not in House						In Secret; House	Not; Eligible	Not; Eligible	BB-elite	No; Nominations	Marin; Ana-Marija	Lucija; Antonio	Evicted (Day 71)						
Petar	Not in House									BB-elite	No; Nominations	Marijan; Orky	Evicted (Day 64)							
Dubravka	In Secret; House	Bojan; Nikita	Lucija; Renata	No; Nominations	Orky; Luka Rok	Exempt	Marijan; Ljiljana	Bojan	Anči; Antonio	BB-elite	No; Nominations	Evicted (Day 57)								
Luciano	Not in House						Marijan; Ljiljana	Bojan	Antonio; Ana	Ribica to save	Evicted (Day 57)									
Ante	Not in House									Exempt	Ejected (Day 57)									
Anči	Not in House			No; Nominations	Nikola V Bojan	Lidija to save	Ljiljana; Anezi	Anezi	Anezi; Luka Rok	Evicted (Day 50)										
Luka Rok	No; Nominations	Lucija; Antonio	Bojana; Lucija	No; Nominations	Nikola V Bojan	Exempt	Lucija; Lidija	Orky	Anči; Ana	Ejected (Day 44)										
Ljiljana	Not in House				Nikola V Orky	Exempt	Dubravka; Lidija	Evicted (Day 43)												
Krištofka	Not in House						In Secret; House	Walked (Day 41)												
Nikola V	In Secret; House	Bojan; Nikita	Lucija; Luka Rok	No; Nominations	Matija; Luka Rok	Tomislav to save	Evicted (Day 36)													
Jure	Not in House					Guest (Day 31)	Evicted (Day 33)													
Matija	In Secret; House	Bojan; Nikita	Lucija; Renata	No; Nominations	Orky; Nikola V	Evicted (Day 29)														
Zebo	Not in House	Ana; Luka	Anezi; Bojan	No; Nominations	Evicted (Day 22)															
Juraj	No; Nominations	Banned	Bojana; Bojan; Anezi	No; Nominations	Evicted (Day 22)															
Bojana	No; Nominations	Renata; Antonio	Juraj; Luka Rok	Evicted (Day 17)																
Renata	No; Nominations	Banned	Anezi; Bojana	Evicted (Day 15)												Guest		Left (Day 91)		
Nikita	No; Nominations	Banned	Walked (Day 9)													Guest		Left (Day 92)		
Antonija	No; Nominations	Walked (Day 8)																		
Aleksandar	Ejected (Day 2)																			
Notes	1	2, 3	4	5	6, 7	8														
Against public vote	none	Ana; Anezi; Bojan; Bojana; Lucija; Renata; ~~Nikita~~	Ana; Anezi; Bojan; Bojana; Lucija; Tomislav	Ana; Anezi; Antonio; Bojan; Juraj; Lucija; Luka Rok; Orky; Tomislav; Zebo	Ana; Anezi; Bojan; Luka Rok; Matija; Nikola V Orky; Tomislav	Ana; Anči; Lucija; Orky; Nikola V Tomislav	Ana; Anezi; Bojan; Dubravka; Ljiljana; Luka Rok	none	Ana; Anči; Anezi; Antonio; Dubravka; Luciano; Lucija; Orky	Ana; Ana-Marija; Lidija; Luciano; Lucija; Marin	All; Housemates	Ana-Marija; Anezi; Bojan; Karla; Lidija; Marijan; Nikola S Petar	Anezi; Antonio; Bojan; Karla; Lucija	Antonio; Bojan; Lidija; Lucija; Marin; Marijan	Ana; Ana-Marija; Bogo; Bojan; Ribica; Marin; Tomislav	Ana; Anezi; Bogo; Lucija; Marin	Ana; Anezi; Lucija; Marin; Tomislav	Ana; Anezi; Antonio; Bojan; Lucija; Marin; Orky; Tomislav	Ana; Anezi; Antonio; Lucija; Orky	
Ejected	Aleksandar	none							Luka Rok	Ante	none									
Walked	Antonija	Nikita	none				Krištofka	none									Lidija (with 35,000 kn)	none		
Evicted	None	Renata; 11% to save	Bojana; 5.6% to save	Juraj; 4.9% to save	Matija; 7.7% to save	Jure; 5 votes to leave	Ljiljana; Fewest votes to save	Bojan; 4 of 12 votes to move	Anči; 4.0% to save	Luciano; Fewest votes to save	Dubravka; Fewest votes to save	Petar; Fewest votes to save	Karla; Fewest votes to save	Marijan; Fewest votes to save	Ana-Marija; Fewest votes to save	Nikola S Fewest votes to save	Marin; Fewest votes to save	Tomislav; Fewest votes to save	Ana; 16.6% to win	Antonio; Fewest votes to win
Evicted	None	Renata; 11% to save	Bojana; 5.6% to save	Juraj; 4.9% to save	Matija; 7.7% to save	Jure; 5 votes to leave	Ljiljana; Fewest votes to save	Bojan; 4 of 12 votes to move	Anči; 4.0% to save	Luciano; Fewest votes to save	Dubravka; Fewest votes to save	Petar; Fewest votes to save	Karla; Fewest votes to save	Marijan; Fewest votes to save	Ana-Marija; Fewest votes to save	Nikola S Fewest votes to save	Marin; Fewest votes to save	Marin; Fewest votes to save	Anezi; 28.7% to win	Lucija; Fewest votes to win
Evicted	None	Renata; 11% to save	Bojana; 5.6% to save	Zebo; 8.2% to save	Matija; 7.7% to save	Nikola V 6.2% to save	Ljiljana; Fewest votes to save	Bojan; 4 of 12 votes to move	Anči; 4.0% to save	Luciano; Fewest votes to save	Dubravka; Fewest votes to save	Petar; Fewest votes to save	Karla; Fewest votes to save	Marijan; Fewest votes to save	Ana-Marija; Fewest votes to save	Nikola S Fewest votes to save	Marin; Fewest votes to save	Marin; Fewest votes to save	Anezi; 28.7% to win	Lucija; Fewest votes to win
Evicted	None	Renata; 11% to save	Bojana; 5.6% to save	Zebo; 8.2% to save	Matija; 7.7% to save	Nikola V 6.2% to save	Ljiljana; Fewest votes to save	Bojan; 4 of 12 votes to move	Anči; 4.0% to save	Luciano; Fewest votes to save	Dubravka; Fewest votes to save	Petar; Fewest votes to save	Karla; Fewest votes to save	Marijan; Fewest votes to save	Ana-Marija; Fewest votes to save	Nikola S Fewest votes to save	Marin; Fewest votes to save	Bojan; Fewest votes to save	Orky; Most votes to win	

=== Notes ===
- ^Note 1 : Aleksandar Neradin was removed from the house for violation of the contract.
- ^Note 2 : Because of the unsuccessful of guessing male housemates' secrets, all female housemates were nominated.
- ^Note 3 : Juraj, Nikita and Renata were banned from nomination as punishment for violated the rules.
- ^Note 4 : Because of the successful of guessing female housemates' secrets, all female housemates were nominated.
- ^Note 5 : Due to violating the rules, all the housemates except Anchy, Dubravka, Marijan, Matija and Nikola were nominated.
- ^Note 6 : Tomislav was nominated forever, while, Ana was automatically nominated by Big Brother due to aggressive behaviour.
- ^Note 7 : In this round, Anči, Lidija, Ljiljana, Marijan and Dubravka won immunity.
- ^Note 8 : The Red team (Ana, Anči, Lidija, Lucija, Nikola, Orky and Tomislav) lost the weekly task and was automatically nominated. But the members of the team could vote to save one of them. Lidija received the most votes and was saved.
