= Big Brother (Croatian TV series) season 5 =

Big Brother
- Season 5
- Presented by: Antonija Blaće
- No. of days: 105
- No. of housemates: 17
- Winner: Krešimir Duvančić
- Runner-up: Ornela Bešker-Amulić

Release
- Original network: RTL
- Original release: 5 September – 19 December 2008

Season chronology
- ← Previous; Big Brother 4 Next → Big Brother 6 Veliki Brat 4

Big Brother 5 (Croatia) began on Friday, 5 September 2008, and was set in Thailand.

== Housemates ==
=== Elizabeta ===
Elizabeta Skoković is a 50-year-old nurse and masseuse from Slavonski Brod, Croatia. Early on in her stay Elizabeta was considering leaving the house, so much so that in the second round of nominations she refused to nominate just so she would be nominated. Following the second eviction(which she survived) Elizabeta had a change of heart and decided that she wanted to stay. She was not nominated again until the eighth round of nominations. She was evicted on Day 84.

=== Ivan L ===
Ivan Lehocki is a 28-year-old geophysicist from Osijek, Croatia. During his stay in the house he was nominated for eviction only once, in round eight of nominations and was evicted on Day 91.

=== Ivan M ===
Ivan Mitrović is a 23-year-old athlete and model from Zagreb, Croatia. During his stay in the Big brother house Ivan M was nominated for eviction four times and was not evicted until the final eviction on Day 98.

=== Krešimir ===
Krešimir Duvančić is a 31-year-old from Zagreb, Croatia. From early on Kresimir proved himself to be both popular with the viewers as well as his fellow housemates and he did not find himself nominated for eviction until round nine of nominations, Kresimir survived the eviction. Kresimir was again nominated in round ten of nominations and he again survived. Kresimir ultimately went on to win by a landslide against the runner up Ornela on day 106.

=== Lucija ===
Lucija Myšičkova is a 31-year-old fashion designer from Zagreb, Croatia. Lucija was nominated in the very first eviction but managed to survive. She was nominated again in the second round of nominations and once again survived. She was nominated again in round three of nominations against Tomislav K and for the third time in a row survived. In round four of nominations Lucija was once again nominated, this time against Marko and Sasa, and she was finally evicted on Day 56.

=== Marko ===
Marko Deša is a 26-year-old personal trainer from Rijeka, Croatia. While in the house Marko started a relationship with fellow housemate Monika. Marko became the housemate to face eviction most often, having been up for eviction in round two, four, six, eight, and ten of nominations. Marko ultimately came in third place on day 106.

=== Martine ===
Martine Manojlović is a 38-year-old makeup artist from New York City, United States. Martine was the first ever American housemate in the history of Big Brother Croatia. On Day 25 Martine left the Big Brother Croatia house after learning that her grandmother was dying.

=== Mira ===
Mira Mariani is a 21-year-old student from Split, Croatia. She entered on Day 39 as a replacement for Tomislav M and Martine. She was nominated in the fifth round of nominations against Ivan M and Ornela and was evicted on Day 63.

=== Monika ===
Monika Bukovac is a 20-year-old student from Rijeka, Croatia. For most of her stay in the house Monika managed to avoid being nominated but in the sixth round of nominations she found herself nominated against Marko and was evicted on Day 70.

=== Ornela ===
Ornela Bešker-Amulić is a 20-year-old student from Split, Croatia. Ornela was the only original female housemate to not be evicted before the finale, though she did face eviction in rounds two, four, and seven. Ornela ultimately placed second in the final on day 106.

=== Rina ===
Rina Dehni is a 25-year-old from Rijeka, Croatia. Rina entered as a new housemate on Day 9. In the second round of nominations Rina found herself nominated and banned from being able to nominate along with Tomislav K and Valerija after they were caught discussing nominations. Rina was evicted on Day 28 but came back to the house as a guest. She is the only housemate this season who never got to nominate.

=== Sabina ===
Sabina Jurić is a 28-year-old from Osijek, Croatia. She entered on Day 39 as a replacement for Martine and Tomislav M. During her stay in the Big Brother house Sabina did well for a non-original housemate surviving several evictions. However, later on in her stay she got in a few fights with Ornela and was caught talking about Marko. She was finally evicted on Day 98.

=== Saša ===
Saša Meničanin is a 25-year-old tour guide from Osijek, Croatia. Whilst in the house Sasa became one of the most nominated housemates of the season, having faced eviction four times, in rounds four, eight, nine, and ten, all of which he survived. Despite surviving four evictions Sasa only managed to place fourth in the finale on day 106.

=== Tomislav K ===
Tomislav Kuščević is a 29-year-old entrepreneur from Split, Croatia. Tomislav K managed to avoid earning enough nomination points to be up for nomination in the first two rounds however in round two he along with Rina and Valerija were nominated by Big Brother for discussing nominations. He survived the second eviction only to be nominated in the third round of nominations against Lucija and was evicted on Day 42.

=== Tomislav M ===
Tomislav Markulinčić is a 26-year-old student from Zagreb, Croatia. From early on in his stay Tomislav M seemed uncomfortable and on Day 10 he left the Big Brother Croatia house stating that it was a mistake to come to the Big brother house and that he wanted to get back to his studies.

=== Valerija ===
Valerija Sever is a 22-year-old waitress from Varaždin, Croatia. Valerija managed to escape nomination in the first round of nominations but was nominated and banned from nominating in the second round of nominations after it was discovered by Big brother that she as well as Tomislav K and Rina had discussed nominations. She managed to survive the second eviction and was not nominated again until the seventh round of nominations. She was nominated against Sabina and was evicted on Day 77.

=== Violeta ===
Violeta Kuštro is a 28-year-old salesman from Osijek, Croatia. She was nominated against Lucija in the first eviction of the series and was evicted on Day 14.

== Nominations table ==
	Week 2	Week 4	Week 6	Week 8	Week 9	Week 10	Week 11	Week 12	Week 13	Week 14	Week 15 Final	
Krešimir	Ivan M Violeta	Lucija; Ornela	Lucija; Marko	Lucija; Marko	Marko; Saša	Marko; Saša	Marko; Saša	Marko; Ivan M	Marko; Ivan M	Ivan M Saša	Winner (Day 105)	
Ornela	Marko; Ivan L	Krešimir; Ivan M	Ivan M Ivan L	Saša; Marko	Ivan M Marko	Valerija; Monika	Valerija; Sabina	Ivan L Saša	Saša; Ivan L	Sabina; Saša	Runner-up (Day 105)	
Marko	Violeta; Valerija	Martine; Lucija	Lucija; Tomislav K	Ornela; Lucija	Ivan M Ornela	Valerija; Sabina	Valerija; Sabina	Elizabeta; Saša	Saša; Krešimir	Ivan M Krešimir	Third place (Day 105)	
Saša	Lucija; Violeta	Lucija; Ornela	Valerija; Tomislav K	Ornela; Elizabeta	Ornela; Mira	Marko; Krešimir	Marko; Elizabeta	Marko; Ornela	Nominated	Nominated	Fourth place (Day 105)	
Sabina	Not In; House			Saša; Marko	Monika; Mira	Monika; Marko	Ivan M Saša	Ivan L Marko	Ivan L Ivan M	Ivan M	Evicted (Day 98)	
Ivan M	Ornela; Lucija	Marko; Lucija	Lucija; Valerija	Ornela; Lucija	Ornela; Mira	Exempt	Valerija; Ornela	Elizabeta; Marko	Marko; Saša	Krešimir; Sabina	Evicted (Day 98)	
Ivan L	Violeta; Elisabeta	Lucija; Ornela	Lucija; Tomislav K	Saša; Marko	Mira; Ivan M.	Monika; Krešimir	Sabina; Valerija	Ornela; Sabina	Saša; Krešimir	Evicted (Day 91)		
Elizabeta	Tomislav M Lucija	Nominated	Saša; Monika	Marko; Saša	Ivan M. Valerija	Marko; Monika	Sabina; Valerija	Sabina; Marko	Evicted (Day 84)			
Valerija	Marko; Lucija	Nominated	Lucija; Marko	Lucija; Marko	Ornela; Marko	Marko; Ornela	Ornela; Marko	Evicted (Day 77)				
Monika	Tomislav M Ivan M	Martine; Lucija	Lucija; Tomislav K	Mira; Lucija	Elizabeta; Sabina	Sabina; Valerija	Evicted (Day 70)					
Mira	Not In; House			Marko; Monika	Ivan M. Valerija	Evicted (Day 63)						
Lucija	Violeta; Valerija	Marko; Krešimir	Ivan L Ivan M	Marko; Saša	Evicted (Day 56)							
Tomislav K	Valerija; Ivan M	Nominated	Marko; Monika	Evicted (Day 42)								
Rina	Not In; House	Nominated	Evicted (Day 28)	Guest							Re-Evicted (Day 98)	
Martine	Violeta; Tomislav M	Marko; Saša	Walked (Day 25)									
Violeta	Ornela; Lucija	Evicted (Day 14)										
Tomislav M	Lucija; Violeta	Walked (Day 10)										
Notes	none	1, 2	3	4	4	4, 5	4		4, 6, 7	4, 7, 8, 9, 10	11	
Walked	Tomislav M	Martine	none									
Up for eviction	Lucija; Violeta	Elizabeta; Lucija; Marko; Ornela; Rina; Tomislav K Valerija	Lucija; Tomislav K	Lucija; Marko; Saša	Ivan M Mira; Ornela	Marko; Monika	Sabina; Valerija	Elizabeta; Ivan M Marko; Ornela; Sabina; Saša	Ivan L Ivan M Krešimir; Marko; Saša	Ivan M Krešimir; Sabina; Saša	Krešimir; Marko; Ornela; Saša	
Evicted	Violeta; 18.3% to evict	Rina; 21.83% to evict	Tomislav K 30.05% to evict	Lucija; 15.85% to evict	Mira; 31.99% to evict	Monika; 0.48% to evict	Valerija; 16.07% to evict	Elizabeta; 18.66% to evict	Ivan L 14.52% to evict	Ivan M 43.14% (out of 4) to evict	Saša; 2.96% (out of 4)	Marko; 21.72% (out of 3)
Evicted	Violeta; 18.3% to evict	Rina; 21.83% to evict	Tomislav K 30.05% to evict	Lucija; 15.85% to evict	Mira; 31.99% to evict	Monika; 0.48% to evict	Valerija; 16.07% to evict	Elizabeta; 18.66% to evict	Ivan L 14.52% to evict	Sabina; 11.70% (out of 3) to evict	Ornela; 34.56% (out of 2)	Krešimir; 65.44% to win

=== Notes ===
- ^1 Elizabeta was automatically nominated for eviction as punishment for refusing to nominate.
- ^2 Rina, Tomislav K and Valerija were automatically nominated and banned from nominating as punishment for discussing nominations.
- ^3 Mira and Sabina entered the house on day 39 as replacements housemates for Tomislav M and Martine.
- ^4 Rina did not nominated this week as she is a guest and not a housemate in the Big brother house.
- ^5 Rina was allowed to give one housemate an exemption from this week's nominations. Rina chose to give the exemption to Ivan M.
- ^6 Because of the large difference between the male to female ratio in the house housemates could only nominate male housemates.
- ^7 Saša was automatically nominated for eviction as punishment for refusing to nominate.
- ^8 Sabina was nominated by Big brother for refusing to nominate a second person for nominations.
- ^9 Marko and Ornela were exempt from nomination because they passed their secret mission. Even though they were exempt they were allowed to nominate.
- ^10 Voting lines were reopened following Ivan M's eviction because it was a double eviction night on day 98.
- ^11 All Housemates were nominated and the public voted for who they wanted to see win.
