= Big Brother (Croatian TV series) season 6 =

Big Brother
- Season 6
- Presented by: Marijana Batinić
- No. of days: 50
- No. of housemates: 15
- Winner: Romano Obilinović

Release
- Original network: RTL
- Original release: 17 April – 3 June 2016

Series chronology
- ← Previous; Big Brother 5 Veliki Brat 5 Next → Big Brother 7

Big Brother 2016 is the sixth season of the Big Brother Croatia and eighth season of Big Brother franchise overall to air on RTL. The show premiered on April 17, 2016 on RTL. Marijana Batinić hosting the main shows.

== Housemates ==
Thirteen housemates, including the host of Big Brother 1 Neno Pavinčić, entered the house on Day 1. After the first eviction, they were joined by Alen (third place in Big Brother 1) and Rina (from Big Brother 5).

Name	Age on entry	Occupation	Residence
Alen Macinić	37	Entrepreneur	Pula
Branimir Kamber	30	Therapist, Actor	Zadar
Dražen Kocijan Kocka	48	Radio Presenter	Bjelovar
Fabio Čulinović	24	Caterer	Rijeka
Ines Huskić	31	Singer, Pharmacist	Zagreb
Ivica Trušček	33	Graphic Artist, MMA Fighter	Koprivnica
Jurica Pađen	61	Musician	Zagreb
Katja Usenik	25	Interior Designer	Rijeka
Kristina Vukas	28	Singer	Split
Marina Raguž	27	Commercial, Model	Inđija, Serbia
Neno Pavinčić	39	Television Presenter	Rijeka
Rina Dehni	33	Administrative Secretary	Rijeka
Romano Obilinović	36	Maintenance worker	Split
Tamara Posavčić	25	Athlete, Coach	Zagreb
Violeta Terček	46	Electrician, Computer Technician	Banja Luka, Bosnia and Herzegovina

== Nominations table ==
	Week 1		Week 2	Week 3	Week 4	Week 5	Week 6	Week 7	Final	
	Day 2	Day 2	Week 2	Week 3	Week 4	Week 5	Week 6	Week 7	Final	
Romano	Neno	Neno; Ivica	Ivica; Katja	Katja; Violeta	Ivica; Katja	Rina; Kristina	Fabio; Alen	Fabio; Ines	Winner (Day 50)	
Ines	Neno	Neno; Ivica	Ivica; Tamara	Ivica; Violeta	Ivica; Katja	Rina; Romano	Rina; Romano	Romano; Alen	Runner-Up (Day 50)	
Kocka	Katja	Fabio; Ines	Ivica; Marina	Ivica; Katja	Ivica; Marina	Rina; Ines	Fabio; Rina	Ines; Alen	Runner-Up (Day 50)	
Fabio	Romano	Romano; Neno	Violeta; Ivica	Marina; Violeta	Ivica; Marina	Romano; Rina	Rina; Romano	Romano; Alen	Fourth Place (Day 50)	
Rina	Not in House			Exempt	Ivica; Fabio	Fabio; Kocka	Ines; Fabio	Fabio; Ines	Fifth Place (Day 50)	
Marina	Violeta	Violeta; Neno	Ivica; Jurica	Ivica; Violeta	Ivica; Kocka	Kristina; Kocka	Ines; Fabio	Fabio; Ines	Evicted (Day 50)	
Alen	Not in House			Exempt	Ivica; Kocka	Romano; Ines	Fabio; Ines	Fabio; Ines	Evicted (Day 50)	
Jurica	Violeta	Marina; Ines	Marina; Violeta	Violeta; Ines	Ivica; Katja	Rina; Kristina	Ines; Rina	Evicted (Day 43)		
Kristina	Tamara	Neno; Marina	Ivica; Tamara	Ivica; Violeta	Ivica; Jurica	Rina; Romano	Evicted (Day 36)			
Katja	Branimir	Branimir; Kristina	Romano; Ivica	Violeta; Ivica	Kocka; Ivica	Evicted (Day 29)				
Ivica	Marina	Violeta; Marina	Jurica; Romano	Kocka; Ines	Fabio; Jurica	Evicted (Day 29)				
Violeta	Kristina	Kristina; Marina	Romano; Tamara	Ivica; Romano	Evicted (Day 22)					
Tamara	Kristina	Evicted (Day 2)	Violeta; Kristina	Re-Evicted (Day 15)						
Branimir	Tamara	Jurica; Neno	Tamara; Marina	Walked (Day 12)						
Neno	Tamara	Ivica; Kocka	Walked (Day 3)							
Notes	none	1	none				2	3	4	
Against public vote	none	Marina; Neno	Ivica; Marina; Romano; Tamara; Violeta	Ines; Ivica; Katja; Violeta	Fabio; Ivica; Jurica; Katja; Kocka; Marina	Ines; Kocka; Kristina; Rina; Romano	Fabio; Ines; Jurica; Romano	Alen; Fabio; Ines; Marina; Romano	Fabio; Ines; Kocka; Rina; Romano	
Walked	none	Neno	Branimir	none						
Evicted	Tamara; 3 of 13 votes to evict	No eviction	Tamara; 39% to evict	Violeta; 50% to evict	Ivica; 29% to evict	Kristina; 31% to evict	Jurica; 41% to evict	Alen; 38% to evict	Rina; 5% (out of 5)	Fabio; 7% (out of 5)
Evicted	Tamara; 3 of 13 votes to evict	No eviction	Tamara; 39% to evict	Violeta; 50% to evict	Katja; 28% to evict	Kristina; 31% to evict	Jurica; 41% to evict	Marina; 24% to evict	? 15% (out of 3)	? 26% (out of 3)
Survived	none	No eviction	Violeta; 34% Ivica; 9% Romano; 9% Marina; 7%	Ivica; 21% Katja; 16% Ines; 7%	Marina; 21% Kocka; 10% Jurica; 7% Fabio; 4%	Rina; 27% Kocka; 19% Romano; 14% Ines; 4%	Romano; 38% Fabio; 11% Ines; 9%	Romano; 21% Fabio; 6% Ines; 4%	Romano; 45% to win	

=== Notes ===
- ^Note 1 Since entering the Big Brother house, Neno is on a secret mission. If his viral video collected more than ten thousand views, he can leave the house and become the host of Big Brother. Neno completed his mission and left on Day 3.
- ^Note 2 Only Fabio and Rina have passed this week's laser maze task. During the live show, they can open a safe by using the code in a letter they won. Fabio won immunity before this week's eviction result was announced. Rina won a place in the finale.
- ^Note 3 Marina is directly nominated as a housemate discovered her offer that was supposed to be secret.
- ^Note 4 The public was voting for the housemate they wanted to win. Following the first vote count, Rina and Fabio finished fifth place and fourth place. Romano crowned the winner. But the production didn't announce who finished third place and second place.
