= Big Brother (Croatian TV series) season 4 =

Big Brother
- Season 4
- Presented by: Antonija Blaće
- No. of days: 106
- No. of housemates: 15
- Winner: Vedran Lovrenčić
- Runner-up: Maja-Paola Sestrić

Release
- Original network: RTL
- Original release: 7 September – 21 December 2007

Season chronology
- ← Previous; Big Brother 3 Next → Big Brother 5

Big Brother 4 is the fourth season of the Croatian reality television series Big Brother that began on 7 September 2007 and ended on 21 December 2007.

The maximum prize was 1.5 million HRK (200 000 EUR). Every successful weekly task increased the final prize by the same amount. Producers introduced penalties as a response to criticism of the second season, when they were perceived to be too tolerant of contestants' misbehavior. At the end of the show the prize was 1,005,000 HRK. Vedran was the winner of the show. In the fourth season 14 housemates entered the house.

== Nominations table ==
	Week 2	Week 4	Week 6	Week 7	Week 8	Week 9	Week 10	Week 11	Week 12	Week 13	Week 14		Week 15 Final	
Vedran	Team 1	Hrvoje; Goran	Ivana; Mirela	No nominations	Ivana	Goran; Martina	Goran; Tessa	No nominations	Vita; Martina	Arsen	Martina; Maja-Paola	No nominations	Winner (Day 106)	
Maja-Paola	Team 1	Ivana; Goran	Senka; Ivana	No nominations	Senka	Senka; Goran	Mateja; Vedran	Nominated	Vedran; Vita	Arsen	Arsen; Martina	No nominations	Runner up (Day 106)	
Krešimir	Team 1	Hrvoje; Goran	Ivana; Mirela	No nominations	Ivana	Goran; Tessa	Goran; Tessa	No nominations	Tessa; Martina	Maja-Paola	Tessa; Martina	No nominations	Third place (Day 106)	
Arsen	Team 2	Senka; Mirela	Mirela; Senka	No nominations	Ivana	Goran; Tessa	Tessa; Goran	Nominated	Tessa; Vita	Stjepan	Tessa; Maja-Paola	No nominations	Fourth place (Day 106)	
Tessa	Team 1	Ivana; Goran	Ivana; Goran	No nominations	Ivana	Arsen; Goran	Arsen; Mateja	No nominations	Krešimir; Arsen	Stjepan	Martina; Arsen	No nominations	Evicted (Day 99)	
Martina	Team 2	Vita; Goran	Senka; Goran	No nominations	Senka	Senka; Vedran	Mateja; Vedran	No nominations	Vedran; Vita	Stjepan	Tessa; Maja-Paola	Evicted (Day 99)		
Stjepan	Team 2	Secret; House		Nominated	Exempt	Goran; Vita	Mateja; Vita	No nominations	Vita; Krešimir	Martina	Evicted (Day 92)			
Vita	Team 2	Mirela; Senka	Secret; House	Nominated	Exempt	Stjepan; Goran	Tessa; Stjepan	No nominations	Vedran; Arsen	Evicted (Day 85)				
Goran	Team 2	Hrvoje; Vita	Mirela; Tessa	No nominations	Senka	Stjepan; Senka	Vedran; Krešimir	Nominated	Evicted (Day 78)					
Mateja	Not in House			Secret; House	Exempt	Stjepan; Senka	Vedran; Krešimir	Evicted (Day 71)						
Senka	Team 1	Vita; Ivana	Ivana; Goran	No nominations	Nominated	Martina; Maja-Paola	Evicted (Day 64)							
Ivana	Team 2	Martina; Hrvoje	Tessa; Senka	No nominations	Nominated	Evicted (Day 57)								
Mirela	Team 1	Ivana; Vita	Ivana; Goran	Nominated	Evicted (Day 50)									
Valentino	Team 1	Secret; House		Nominated	Evicted (Day 50)									
Hrvoje	Team 2	Tessa; Vita	Walked (Day 33)											
Notes	;;		none				none	;		;				
Nominated	Krešimir; Maja-Paola; Mirela; Senka; Tessa; Valentino; Vedran	Goran; Vita	Goran; Ivana; Mirela; Senka	Mirela; Stjepan; Valentino; Vita	Ivana; Senka	Goran; Senka	Mateja; Tessa; Vedran	Arsen; Goran; Maja-Paola	Krešimir; Martina; Tessa; Vedran; Vita	Arsen; Martina; Stjepan; Tessa	Krešimir; Maja-Paola; Martina; Tessa; Vedran	Arsen; Krešimir; Maja-Paola; Tessa; Vedran	Arsen; Krešimir; Maja-Paola; Vedran	
Evicted	Valentino; 34.1% to move	Vita; 63% to move	Mirela; 41% to move	Valentino; 5.96% to save	Ivana; 4 of 7 votes to evict	Senka; 78.13% to evict	Mateja; 65.59% to evict	Goran; 45.50% to evict	Vita; 34.38% to evict	Stjepan; 36.95% to evict	Martina; 44.92% to evict	Tessa; 43.89% to evict	Arsen; 12.84% (out of 4)	Krešimir; 14.62% (out of 3)
Evicted	Stjepan; Answered; Hot Phone	Vita; 63% to move	Mirela; 41% to move	Mirela; 7.64% to save	Ivana; 4 of 7 votes to evict	Senka; 78.13% to evict	Mateja; 65.59% to evict	Goran; 45.50% to evict	Vita; 34.38% to evict	Stjepan; 36.95% to evict	Martina; 44.92% to evict	Tessa; 43.89% to evict	Maja-Paola; 48.30% (out of 2)	Vedran; 51.70% to win

=== Notes ===
- ^1 The public were voting for the housemate they want to move to a Secret House.
- ^2 This week there were no nominations. The 14 housemates were split into 2 teams and competed in a competition. The winning team would be given immunity and the losing team would be up for eviction. Team one lost the competition.
- ^3 Stjepan was fake evicted as he answered the Hot Phone.
- ^4 There were public nominations.
- ^5 The housemates from the Secret House were automatically up for eviction with the housemates that survived the vote moving back into the main house.
- ^6 All housemates, with the exception of Mateja, Stjepan & Vita, are up for nomination. The public will do the nominating and the housemates that receive the most votes being up for eviction.
- ^7 Mateja was immune as she is a new housemate in the main house.
- ^8 Maja-Paola failed her secret mission so she was nominated by Big Brother.
- ^9 Goran and Arsen were not in the "company of chosen" so they were nominated.
- ^10 Vita's votes were refused, and was nominated by big brother because she did not give good reasons for nominations.
- ^11 Housemates nominated only one housemate who they think will be in the finals
- ^12 Arsen, Martina and Tessa were nominated because they nominated Stjepan, who received the most nominations that round.
- ^13 Krešimir and Vedran failed their secret mission so they were nominated by Big Brother.
- ^14 All housemates were nominated and the public had 30 minutes to vote for the eviction, that would take place that same evening.
- ^15 The public was voting for the winner of the show.
