= Star Search Croatia season 1 =

Star Search Croatia
- Season 1
- Hosted by: Antonija Blaće
- Judges: Tony Cetinski, Jelena Radan, Goran Lisica-Fox
- Winner: Bojan Jambrošić
- Runner-up: Zoran Mišić

Release
- Original network: RTL Televizija
- Original release: February 2009 – June 19, 2009

Season chronology
- Next → Season 2

Star Search Croatia (Croatian: Hrvatska traži zvijezdu) Season 1 was the first season of the second Croatian version of Pop Idol. It was aired in 2009.

Auditions were about to be held in the four biggest cities of the country: Zagreb, Rijeka, Osijek and Split. The competitors are judged by Croatian musicians Tony Cetinski, Jelena Radan and Goran Lisica Fox.

Antonija Blaće, famous for participating and hosting the Croatian Big Brother edition is the host of the competition which makes her the first person to host the two local versions of these franchises.

Bojan Jambrošić won the show on June 19, 2009 ahead of the favoured Zoran Mišić.

== Live Shows ==
=== Top 17 Semifinal Idol's Choice ===
Original Airdate: April 17, 2009

| Contestant | Song (Artist) | Audience Vote/ Jury Vote |
|---|---|---|
| Nika Antolos | Hurt (Christina Aguilera) | Out |
| Nikolina Kovačević | Mercy (Duffy) | Votes |
| Leo Pavlačić | Womanizer (Britney Spears) | Out |
| Patricia Gašparini | It must have been love (Roxette) | Out |
| Sementa Rajhard | Summertime (Billie Holiday) | Judges |
| Tomislav Kramarić | How You Remind Me (Nickelback) | Out |
| Duško Šarić | Hero (Enrique Iglesias) | Judges |
| Sonja Washington | Killing Me Softly with His Song (Roberta Flack) | Out |
| Matej Miličić | Apologize (OneRepublic) | Vote |
| Manuela Svorcan | Big Girl's Don't Cry (Fergie) | Vote |
| Carla Belovari | Soulmate (Natasha Bedingfield) | Judges |
| Anđela Poljak | Nobody's Wife (Anouk) | Judges |
| Bojan Jambrošić | Sorry Seems To Be The Hardest Word (Elton John) | Vote |
| Barbara Dautović | Run (Leona Lewis) | Vote |
| Vedran Jagodić | This Love (Maroon 5) | Out |
| Iva Ušalj | Sober (Pink) | Vote |
| Zoran Mišić | Paradise City (Guns N' Roses) | Vote |

Advancing to Top 11 (Public votes): Zoran, Matej, Barbara, Manuela, Bojan, Nikolina, Iva

Advancing to Top 11 (Jury selection): Sementa, Anđela, Carla Jelena, Duško

=== Top 11 - Croatian Love Songs ===
Original Airdate: April 24, 2009

| Contestant | Song (Artist) | Verdict |
|---|---|---|
| Anđela Poljak | Vjerujem (Ivana Banfić) | Out |
| Barbara Dautović | Kosa (Nina Badrić) | |
| Bojan Jambrošić | Dužna si (Jacques Houdek) | |
| Carla Belovari | Ima jedan svijet (Stijene) | |
| Duško Šarić | K'o sam bez tebe (Boris Novković) | Btm 3 |
| Iva Ušalj | Srebrni (The Flare) | |
| Manuela Svorcan | Ledeno doba (Vanna) | Out |
| Matej Miličić | Lipa moja (Gibonni) | Btm 5 |
| Nikolina Kovačević | Tempera (Gibonni) | |
| Sementa Rajhard | Odjednom ti (Meritas feat. Massimo Savić) | Btm 4 |
| Zoran Mišić | Jednom Kad Noć (Opća Opasnost) | |

Bottom 5: Anđela Poljak, Duško Šarić, Manuela Svorcan, Matej Miličić, Sementa Rajhard

Eliminated: Anđela Poljak, Manuela Svorcan

=== Top 9 - Sexy Show ===
Original Airdate: May 1, 2009

| Contestant | Song (Artist) | Verdict |
|---|---|---|
| Sementa Rajhard | Naughty Girl (Beyoncé Knowles) | Out |
| Carla Belovari | Fever (Little Willie John) | Btm 4 |
| Matej Miličić | Hold Me Now (Johnny Logan) | |
| Duško Šarić | Sex Bomb (Tom Jones) | Btm 3 |
| Barbara Dautović | Say It Right (Nelly Furtado) | |
| Zoran Mišić | You Can Leave Your Hat On (Joe Cocker) | |
| Iva Ušalj | Poker face (Lady Gaga) | Btm 2 |
| Bojan Jambrošić | Kiss (Prince) | |
| Nikolina Kovačević | Ain't Nobody (Rufus and Chaka Khan) | Btm 5 |

Bottom 5: Carla Belovari, Duško Šarić, Iva Ušalj, Nikolina Kovačević, Sementa Rajhard

Eliminated: Sementa Rajhard

=== Top 8 - Dedications ===
Original Airdate: May 8, 2009

| Contestant | Song (Artist) | Verdict |
|---|---|---|
| Zoran Mišić | Sve još miriše na nju (Parni valjak) | |
| Barbara Dautović | Tuga dolazi kasnije (Tina Vukov) | Btm 2 |
| Matej Miličić | Igra bez granica (Toše Proeski) | |
| Bojan Jambrošić | Ti si mi u krvi (Zdravko Čolić) | |
| Nikolina Kovačević | Od ljubavi (Mayales) | |
| Duško Šarić | Još ne znam kud s tobom (Hari Rončević) | Out |
| Carla Belovari | Ako je vrijedilo išta (Vanna) | |
| Iva Ušalj | Zlatne godine (Gibonni) | |

Bottom 2: Barbara Dautović, Duško Šarić

Eliminated: Duško Šarić

=== Top 7 - Film Songs / Croatian Songs ===
Original Airdate: May 15, 2009

| Contestant | Song (Artist) | Verdict |
|---|---|---|
| Barbara Dautović | There You'll Be (Faith Hill) | |
| Barbara Dautović | Gdje Dunav ljubi nebo (Josipa Lisac) | |
| Bojan Jambrošić | I Believe I Can Fly (R. Kelly) | Btm 3 |
| Bojan Jambrošić | Čija si (Toše Proeski) | Btm 3 |
| Carla Belovari | I Will Always Love You (Whitney Houston) | Btm 4 |
| Carla Belovari | Ljubav se zove imenom tvojim (Dino Dvornik) | Btm 4 |
| Iva Ušalj | Iris (Goo Goo Dolls) | Out |
| Iva Ušalj | Tamo gdje je sve po mom (Jinx) | Out |
| Matej Miličić | Can You Feel the Love Tonight (Elton John) | Btm 2 |
| Matej Miličić | Marija Magdalena (Doris Dragović) | Btm 2 |
| Nikolina Kovačević | Licence to Kill (Gladys Knight) | |
| Nikolina Kovačević | Naučila sam trik (Natali Dizdar) | |
| Zoran Mišić | Hero (Chad Kroeger) | |
| Zoran Mišić | Dolazi oluja (Divlje jagode) | |

Bottom 4: Bojan Jambrošić, Carla Belovari, Iva Ušalj, Matej Miličić

Eliminated: Iva Ušalj

- Vedran Misic from suisse

== Finals Elimination Chart ==
| Stage: | | Semi | Finals | | | | | | | | |
| Week: | | 4/17 | 4/24 | 5/1 | 5/8 | 5/15 | 5/22 | 5/29 | 6/5 | 6/12 | 6/19 |
| Place | Contestant | Result | | | | | | | | | |
| 1 | Bojan Jambrošić | Viewers | | | | Btm 3 | | | | | Winner |
| 2 | Zoran Mišić | Viewers | | | | | | | | | Runner-up |
| 3 | Barbara Dautović | Viewers | | | Btm 2 | | | | | Elim | |
| 4 | Matej Miličić | Viewers | Btm 5 | | | Btm 2 | | Btm 2 | Elim | | |
| 5 | Carla Belovari | Judges | | Btm 4 | | Btm 4 | Btm 2 | Elim | | | |
| 6 | Nikolina Kovačević | Viewers | | Btm 5 | | | Elim | | | | |
| 7 | Iva Ušalj | Viewers | | Btm 2 | | Elim | | | | | |
| 8 | Duško Šarić | Judges | Btm 3 | Btm 3 | Elim | | | | | | |
| 9 | Sementa Rajhard | Judges | Btm 4 | Elim | | | | | | | |
| 10-11 | Manuela Svorcan | Viewers | Elim | | | | | | | | |
| 10-11 | Anđela Poljak | Judges | Elim | | | | | | | | |
| 12-17 | Leo Pavlačić | Elim | | | | | | | | | |
| 12-17 | Nika Antolos | Elim | | | | | | | | | |
| 12-17 | Patricia Gašparini | Elim | | | | | | | | | |
| 12-17 | Sonja Washington | Elim | | | | | | | | | |
| 12-17 | Tomislav Kramarić | Elim | | | | | | | | | |
| 12-17 | Vedran Jagodić | Elim | | | | | | | | | |

Legend
| Female | Male | Top 10 | Top 17 |
