= Goran Todić =

Bosnian actor (born 1967)

- Born: February 3, 1967 (age 59); Sarajevo, SR Bosnia and Herzegovina, SFR Yugoslavia
- Other names: Gogo Base, Suki
- Occupation: Actor

Goran Todić (born 3 February 1967) is a Bosnian actor. He became a popular participation in Big Brother from 2015, where he won second place. He currently lives on the island of Vis, in Komiža. He finished an acting academy and acted in several plays in Belgrade, where he served in the army.

== Biography ==
Did not participate in the war in BiH, but returned in 1992 in Sarajevo to pull the mother Ružica Bagarić who is ethnically Croatian. After that, he traveled to Italy to Milan, where he tried to be glorified as an actor where he played in the Italian series. During his work in the theater entered the academy for bodyguards. He kept many famous figures such as Berlusconi's wife, Veronica Lara, Jennifer Lopez, Penélope Cruz, etc. He claims that with everyone was solely a business relationship, although there were rumors that in connection with the wife of former Italian prime minister.
