= Big Brother (Croatian TV series) season 3 =

Big Brother
- Season 3
- Presented by: Antonija Blaće
- No. of days: 99
- No. of housemates: 14
- Winner: Danijel Rimanić
- Runner-up: Tomislav Šimićević

Release
- Original network: RTL
- Original release: 8 September – 15 December 2006

Season chronology
- ← Previous; Big Brother 2 Next → Big Brother 4

Big Brother 3 is the third season of the Croatian reality television series Big Brother that premiered on 8 September 2006 and ran for 99 days. The prize is increased from 1 million HRK (134 000 EUR) to 1.5 million HRK (200 000 EUR), but it is expected that the actual winner would get significantly lower amount due to penalties for various House rule violations. Producers introduced this as a response to criticism of the second season when they were perceived to be too tolerant of contestants' misbehavior.

== Season summary ==
In the third season, the housemates were originally 12. Later, 2 new housemates – selected by the candidates from the pool of 4 – entered the House.

Tanja was the "guardian angel" and had the power to save one of her Housemates from being nominated. On the 2nd nominations, on Day 21, by votes of the Housemates, Lea and Zoran were supposed to be nominated. Tanja saved Lea from being nominated. Instead of Lea, Ana and Dragica were nominated. 7 days later Dragica left the House. Tanja lost her power because she disrespected Big Brother's order not to mention anything to the other Housemates. On the 3rd nominations on Day 35, she was nominated by Big Brother. Lea and Simon were also nominated from the side of their Housemates.

The third nominations were also Public Nominations. On these nominations, Housemates had to nominate 2 Housemates in front of the rest of the Housemates. On these nominations everyone nominated the same Housemates they have nominated on the day before; during the False Nominations, except Yameisey who has changed her mind and had nominated Zoran instead of Simon and Simon who took the chance to revenge and had nominated Ana and Ante instead of Danijel and Zoran. 7 days later, Simon left the House.

Lea in the first week of the show received a secret mission from BigBrother. She had to sabotage the Housemates and had to be nominated when the nominations come. Lea, also as Tanja, received an order not to mention anything about her secret mission or she will be evicted. She disrespected the order by hinting something to her Housemates and on Day 7, Big Brother told her that her secret mission was successful, but Big Brother took 20 000 HRK (2670 EUR) from the Main Prize because Lea had hinted something to her Housemates.

On Day 56, Violeta received her secret mission which gives her big power. On Day 55, Big Brother told the Housemates that they have to compose the order on which they will enter the Confessions Room and nominate 2 Housemates. Violeta was placed last on that list. Violeta became the Judas of Big Brother House. If she tells or hints something to her Housemates she will lose her power and be nominated on the next nominations. How does her power work? On nominations, Violeta will always nominate last. When she enters the Confessions Room Big Brother will tell her who are the nominated Housemates. She has to choose 1 Housemate who isn't nominated. That Housemate also becomes nominated. On Day 56, that Housemate was Tanja who had 0 votes of the rest of the Housemates.

Danijel received a secret mission to sabotage the week task. The task was to make wine. Danijel had to spill some wine every time when Big Brother asks Yameisy to come to the Confessions Room. Thanks to Danijel Housemates passed the week task. If Danijel had failed the Housemates would have failed the week task.

From Day 71 to Day 77, Violeta had a secret mission to break 14 plates, hide the House credit card and to stock Ante. Violeta was successful in her secret mission. For reward Big Brother applied the Housemates requests for buying cigarettes, entering in the Surprise Room and playing music quiet than louder while waking the Housemates.

Big Brother told that every housemate will be hypnotized by a hypnotizer Leon The Great. Actually, none of the housemates were hypnotized. They all were not hypnotized on the excuse that they have a secret mission. All of the secret missions were successful!

On the final, Day 99, 10 Housemates who left the House came back in the House, but not as participants, but as friends on the finalists so they can help them to "cut" time while the show is running and the final results aren't announced. Big Brother prepared Yameisy a surprise and brought her mother Julia from Cuba. It was a huge and a great surprise for Yameisy. Yameisy told that she won a million only by seeing her mother.

== Nominations table ==
	Week 2	Week 4	Week 5	Week 6	Week 8	Week 9	Week 10	Week 11	Week 12	Week 13	Week 14 Final	
Danijel	Lea; Romina	Lea; Ana	Lea; Violeta	Lea; Violeta	Lea; Ana	Yameisy; Ana	Ana; Yameisy	Yameisy; Tomislav	Yameisy; Tomislav	Yameisy; Tomislav	Winner (Day 99)	
Tomislav	Not in House	Zoran; Lea	Violeta; Lea	Violeta; Lea	Lea; Violeta	Zoran; Nikša	Zoran; Danijel	Danijel; Ante	Danijel; Ante	Violeta; Danijel	Runner-up (Day 99)	
Tanja	Zoran; Mathias	Zoran; Dragica	Lea; Simon	Lea; Simon	Danijel; Lea	Zoran; Danijel	Danijel; Zoran	Danijel; Ana	Danijel; Violeta	Danijel; Violeta	Third place (Day 99)	
Yameisy	Zoran; Lea	Zoran; Lea	Lea; Ante	Zoran; Lea	Zoran; Ante	Zoran; Ana	Ante; Danijel	Ante; Ana	Ante; Danijel	Nominated	Fourth place (Day 99)	
Violeta	Mathias; Romina	Ana; Dragica	Danijel; Tomislav	Tomislav; Danijel	Zoran; Ante	Tanja	Zoran; Danijel	Ana; Ante	Danijel; Ante	Tanja; Danijel	Evicted (Day 92)	
Ante	Ana; Lea	Lea; Tanja	Lea; Simon	Lea; Simon	Lea; Ana	Nikša; Danijel	Danijel; Yameisy	Ana; Yameisy	Yameisy; Danijel	Evicted (Day 85)		
Ana	Lea; Simon	Lea; Simon	Lea; Simon	Lea; Simon	Danijel; Zoran	Danijel; Nikša	Danijel; Ante	Tanja; Ante	Evicted (Day 78)			
Zoran	Lea; Romina	Nikša; Simon	Nikša; Simon	Nikša; Simon	Lea; Nikša	Yameisy; Nikša	Violeta; Danijel	Evicted (Day 71)				
Nikša	Zoran; Mathias	Ante; Zoran	Ante; Zoran	Ante; Zoran	Ante; Zoran	Zoran; Ana	Evicted (Day 64)					
Lungile Radu	Mathias; Ana	Danijel; Dragica	Danijel; Ana	Danijel; Ana	Ante; Zoran	Evicted (Day 57)						
Simon	Nikša; Danijel	Zoran; Ana	Zoran; Danijel	Ana; Ante	Evicted (Day 43)							
Dragica	Not in House	Ante; Lea	Evicted (Day 29)									
Mathias	Lea; Violeta	Evicted (Day 15)										
Romina	Lea; Zoran	Walked (Day 14)										
Notes			none		none		none				none	
Nominated	Mathias; Zoran	Ana; Dragica; Zoran	none	Lea; Simon; Tanja	Ante; Lea; Zoran	Nikša; Tanja; Zoran	Danijel; Zoran	Ana; Ante	Ante; Danijel	Danijel; Violeta; Yameisy	Danijel; Tanja; Tomislav; Yameisy	
Walked	Romina	none										
Evicted	Mathias; 55% to evict	Dragica; 41% to evict	No eviction	Simon; 44% to evict	Lea; 83% to evict	Nikša; 46% to evict	Zoran; 51% to evict	Ana; 52% to evict	Ante; 55% to evict	Violeta; 38% to evict	Yameisy; 13.2% (out of 4)	Tanja; 21% (out of 3)
Evicted	Mathias; 55% to evict	Dragica; 41% to evict	No eviction	Simon; 44% to evict	Lea; 83% to evict	Nikša; 46% to evict	Zoran; 51% to evict	Ana; 52% to evict	Ante; 55% to evict	Violeta; 38% to evict	Tomislav; 48.3% (out of 2)	
Not evicted	Zoran; 45%	Ana; 40% Zoran; 19%	No eviction	Lea; 36% Tanja; 20%	Zoran; 9% Ante; 8%	Tanja; 30% Zoran; 24%	Danijel; 49%	Ante; 48%	Danijel; 45%	Yameisy; 32% Danijel; 30%	Danijel; 51.7% to win	

=== Notes ===
- ^1 Lea received immunity
- ^2 Lea was saved from eviction by Tanja. Ana & Dragica were nominated in Lea's place.
- ^3 Since Violeta was the last person to nominate it was decided that she could only nominate one person for eviction and whoever she nominated would be automatically nominated.
- ^4 Zoran was nominated by Big Brother because he broke the rules.
- ^5 Yameisy was nominated by Big Brother because she refused to nominate.
