= Big Brother (Croatian TV series) season 2 =

Big Brother
- Season 2
- Presented by: Antonija Blaće
- No. of days: 118
- No. of housemates: 21
- Winner: Hamdija Seferović
- Runner-up: Daca Bosančić

Release
- Original network: RTL
- Original release: 4 September – 30 December 2005

Season chronology
- ← Previous; Big Brother 1 Next → Big Brother 3

Big Brother 2 is the second season of the Croatian reality television series Big Brother that premiered on 4 September to 30 December 2005 and ran for 118 days.

== Season summary ==
The second season had radical changes in the format of the show — the number of contestants was initially raised from 12 to 14; the pace of evictions and nominations was accelerated, and numbers of contestants were introduced at later stages.

The composition of contestants was different—they were much younger, less educated and generally perceived to be less mature. They also tended to represent various sections of the Croatian population, missing in the previous season. This was most evident with Matko Okmažić from Omiš, the 25-year-old son of the restaurant owner, later revealed to be the candidate of far-right parties at local elections. Okmažić, although popular with contestants, outraged many liberal Croatians with his chauvinist views and later had to publicly apologize after singing "Jasenovac i Gradiška Stara", the controversial song of Croatian far-right singer Joško Tomičić. He outraged feminist and gays rights groups after a statement that he would kill his girlfriend if he found out she is cheating on him. In 2001 local elections for Omiš city council he was 14th on the list for HB/HKDU hard right coalition.

Despite this, Okmažić gradually evolved as the front-runner for the prize. He never got nominated and was part of the unofficial clan of self-declared "finalists". One of those was Hamdija Seferović, the only Roma contestant in the show. Mild-mannered and soft-spoken Seferović gradually won many sympathies among Croatian public, first by publicly admitting his lack of primary education, then by cultivating the image of a dedicated family man.

Because of this, the actual finals proved to be quite unpredictable. This was also due to Daca Bosančić, the candidate who entered finals despite her female gender, the status of a replacement candidate. In the end, Seferović finished first and Bosančić finished second.

This result was often perceived as the victory of liberal-minded and pro-European Croatians over the right-wingers embodied in Matko Okmažić.

The second season, just like first, also had its share of criticism—mostly due to lack of creativity among producers — but surprisingly the rating was higher than the first seasons. There were also complaints about bet shops influencing the ultimate result by publishing low odds for evictees early in the week and many conspiracy theories about huge bets being used as a tool for manipulations.

== Nominations table ==
	Week 1	Week 2	Week 3	Week 4	Week 5	Week 6	Week 7	Week 8	Week 9	Week 10	Week 11	Week 12	Week 13	Week 14	Week 15	Week 16	Week 17 Final		Nominations received
Hamdija	No; Nominations	Kristina, Nataša	Brankica, Monika	Kristina, Lana	Lana, Sanja	Kristian, Kristina	Hana, Kristian	No; Nominations	Lana, Sanja	Daca, Dominik	Matea, Sanja	Daca, Matea	Maroje, Matea	Daca, Matea	Matea, Tatjana	Daca, Tatjana	Winner (Day 118)		16
Daca	Not in House								Exempt	Hamdija, Kristian	Hamdija, Ivan	Hamdija, Ivan	Maroje, Tatjana	Matko, Željka	Matea, Tatjana	Ivan, Matko	Runner-up (Day 118)		14
Matko	No; Nominations	Kristina, Nataša	Kristina, Monika	Kristina, Monika	Igor, Kristina	Ivan, Kristina	Hana, Sanja	No; Nominations	Lana, Sanja	Daca, Dominik	Daca, Matea	Daca, Matea	Daca, Maroje	Matea, Željka	Matea, Tatjana	Daca, Tatjana	Third place (Day 118)		7
Ivan	No; Nominations	Brankica, Kristina	Brankica, Igor	Monika, Sanja	Lana, Sanja	Kristian, Sanja	Kristian, Sanja	No; Nominations	Lana, Sanja	Dominik, Matea	Matea, Sanja	Daca, Željka	Maroje, Tatjana	Matea, Željka	Matea, Tatjana	Daca, Tatajana	Fourth Place (Day 118)		23
Tatjana	Not in House											Exempt	Ivan, Maroje	Ivan, Matea	Daca, Ivan	Daca, Ivan	Evicted (Day 111)		12
Matea	Not in House								Exempt	Hamdija, Ivan	Hamdija, Matko	Hamdija, Željka	Maroje, Tatjana	Hamdija, Tatjana	Ivan, Matko	Evicted (Day 104)			21
Željka	Not in House								Exempt	Dominik, Hamdija	Hamdija, Matea	Ivan, Matea	Maroje, Tatjana	Matea, Tatjana	Evicted (Day 97)				6
Maroje	Not in House											Exempt	Matea, Željka	Evicted (Day 90)					7
Kristian	No; Nominations	Kristina, Monika	Kristina, Monika	Kristina, Monika	Ivan, Igor	Ivan, Kristina	Hana, Kristina	No; Nominations	Hamdija, Ivan	Dominik, Matea	Daca, Matea	Nominated	Evicted (Day 83)						9
Sanja	No; Nominations	Monika, Nataša	Duje, Kristina	Duje, Kristina	Ivan, Igor	Duje, Ivan	Duje, Hamdija	No; Nominations	Matko, Hamdija	Hamdija, Ivan	Ivan, Kristian	Evicted (Day 76)							13
Dominik	Not in House								Exempt	Ivan, Kristian	Evicted (Day 69)								5
Lana	No; Nominations	Kristina, Monika	Igor, Kristina	Igor, Kristina	Duje, Igor	Duje, Ivan	Hana, Ivan	No; Nominations	Hamdija, Ivan	Evicted (Day 62)									9
Duje	No; Nominations	Kristina, Nataša	Kristina, Sanja	Igor, Monika	Igor, Lana	Kristina, Sanja	Hana, Lana	No; Nominations	Evicted (Day 55)										11
Hana	Not in House					Exempt	Hamdija, Kristian	Evicted (Day 48)											5
Kristina	No; Nominations	Brankica, Igor	Duje, Matko	Igor, Matko	Igor, Kristian	Duje, Ivan	Evicted (Day 41)												30
Igor	No; Nominations	Brankica, Kristina	Brankica, Kristina	Kristina, Monika	Kristina, Lana	Evicted (Day 34)													15
Monika	No; Nominations	Duje, Nataša	Duje, Kristina	Duje, Igor	Evicted (Day 27)														11
Brankica	No; Nominations	Kristina, Igor	Kristina, Igor	Evicted (Day 20)															6
Nataša	No; Nominations	Hamdija, Kristina	Evicted (Day 13)																5
Biserka	No; Nominations	Evicted (Day 6)																	N/A
René	No; Nominations	Evicted (Day 6)																	N/A
Nomination notes	1	none				2	none	1	3	none		4	none				5		
Nominated	All; Housemates	Kristina, Nataša	Brankica, Duje, Igor, Kristina, Monika	Kristina, Monika	Igor, Lana	Ivan, Kristina	Hana, Kristian	All; Housemates	Lana, Sanja	Dominik, Hamdija	Daca, Hamdija, Ivan, Kristian, Matea, Sanja	Daca, Kristian, Matea	Maroje, Tatjana	Matea, Željka	Matea, Tatjana	Daca, Tatjana	Daca, Hamdija, Ivan, Matko		
Evicted	René; 29% to evict	Nataša; 55% to evict	Brankica; 43% to evict	Monika; 66% to evict	Igor; 70% to evict	Kristina; 75% to evict	Hana; 57% to evict	Duje; 35% to evict	Lana; 53% to evict	Dominik; 54% to evict	Sanja; 28% to evict	Kristian; 58% to evict	Maroje; 68% to evict	Željka; 64% to evict	Matea; 52% to evict	Tatjana; 81% to evict	Ivan; 22% (out of 4)	Matko; 30% (out of 3)	
Evicted	Biserka; 17% to evict	Nataša; 55% to evict	Brankica; 43% to evict	Monika; 66% to evict	Igor; 70% to evict	Kristina; 75% to evict	Hana; 57% to evict	Duje; 35% to evict	Lana; 53% to evict	Dominik; 54% to evict	Sanja; 28% to evict	Kristian; 58% to evict	Maroje; 68% to evict	Željka; 64% to evict	Matea; 52% to evict	Tatjana; 81% to evict	Daca; 48.5% (out of 2)	Hamdija; 51.5% to win	

=== Notes ===
- ^Note 1 : There were no nominations this week, and all housemates automatically faced the public vote.
- ^Note 2 : As a new housemate, Hana was exempt from the nominations process this week.
- ^Note 3 : As new housemates, Daca, Dominik, Matea, and Željka were exempt from the nominations process this week.
- ^Note 4 : As new housemates, Maroje and Tatjana were exempt from the nominations process this week. Kristian automatically faced the public vote due to not fully participating in a task.
- ^Note 5 : This week, the public were voting for a winner, rather than to evict.
