= Big Brother (Serbian TV series) season 5 =

Big Brother
- Season 5
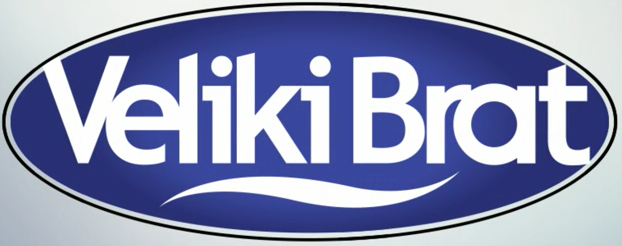
- Logo for the fifth season that was used in Serbia, Bosnia and Herzegovina, Montenegro and Macedonia.
- Presented by: Antonija Blaće; Sky Wikluh
- No. of days: 100
- No. of housemates: 20
- Winner: Darko "Spejko" Petkovski
- Runner-up: Goran Todić
- Participating countries: Serbia; Bosnia and Herzegovina; Montenegro; Macedonia; Croatia

Release
- Original network: B92; Televizija OBN, BN; Prva TV; Sitel; RTL Televizija
- Original release: 6 September – 12 December 2015

Season chronology
- ← Previous; Serbian season 4 Next → Croatian season 6

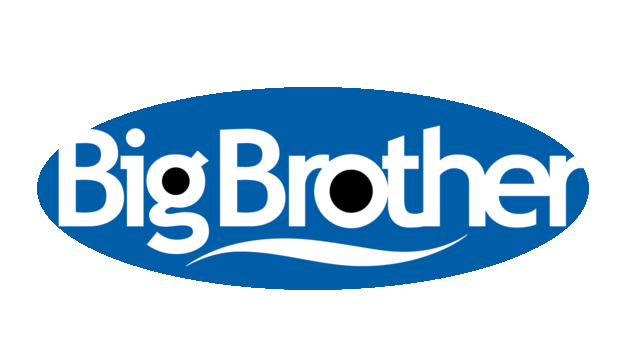
The Big Brother logo used in Croatia for this season.

Veliki Brat 2015, also known as Veliki Brat 5, is the fifth season of the television reality show Veliki Brat, the Serbian, Bosnian, Montenegrin and Macedonian joint version of Big Brother. This season is the fifth season of the show in Serbia and seventh overall in Croatia - for both a first season after the show went on a two-year hiatus. The show is broadcast by RTL for Croatia, B92 and Prva TV for Serbia, OBN and BN for Bosnia & Herzegovina, Sitel for Macedonia and Prva for Montenegro.

Veliki Brat 5 was originally planned for fall 2013, but producers decided to cancel, and said that they would instead to do one in early 2014. Later on, in spring 2014, they said they plan to push it to fall 2014, or even spring 2015. On 12 October 2014, it was announced that the season will not be aired, because the house was demolished. However, this news was fake, since Slovenia used that house earlier in 2015 for their season. It was later revealed that Veliki Brat would start on September 4, with Antonija Blaće and Sky Wikluh (who previously participated in Veliki Brat VIP 2) as the hosts.

The Final took place on 12 December. This is the first season won by a Macedonian housemate.

== Housemates ==
Fourteen housemates entered the show on Day 1. On Day 2, Anton, Luka and Ivona entered the house. On Day 22, Mirjana and Vesna entered the house. On Day 50, Dorde and Jozefina entered the house.

| Housemate | Age on entry | Occupation | Birthplace/Residence | Day entered | Day exited | Status |
|---|---|---|---|---|---|---|
| Darko "Spejko" Petkovski | 27 | Coach, DJ, fitness model and basketball school owner | Kumanovo, North Macedonia | 1 | 100 | Winner |
| Goran Todić | 48 | Diving instructor | Komiža, Croatia | 1 | 100 | Runner-up |
| Ervin Mujaković | 24 | Tanning salonmanager, fitness instructor and soldier | Sarajevo, Bosnia and Herzegovina | 1 | 100 | 3rd Place |
| Barbara Šegetin | 25 | Model | Rijeka/Zagreb, Croatia | 1 | 100 | 4th Place |
| Dragutin "Giba" Vasić (Note: Giba, Mika, Rada and Radivoje are Vasić family.) | 23 | Hairdresser | Prokuplje | 1 | 99 | Evicted (Note: Giba and Mika are living together in the House as a pair known as a 2-in-1 Housemate. They participated in tasks and nominated for eviction together. On Day 99 they were evicted as a single Housemate.) |
| Miroslav "Mika" Vasić | 23 | Hairdresser | Prokuplje | 1 | 99 | Evicted |
| Zorica Marković | 48 | Cafe singer | Kraljevo | 1 | 99 | Evicted |
| Tina Šegetin | 24 | Model | Rijeka/Zagreb, Croatia | 1 | 99 | Evicted |
| Rada Vasić | 50 | Housewife | Prokuplje | 1 | 92 | Evicted |
| Mirjana Praizović | 22 | Club hostess | Laktaši, Bosnia and Herzegovina | 22 | 85 | Evicted |
| Đorđe Đenić | 29 | Swimming instructor and personal trainer | Nova Varoš | 50 | 78 | Evicted |
| Radivoje Vasić | 55 | Cafe singer | Prokuplje | 1 | 71 | Evicted |
| Jozefina Išaretović | 24 | Handball player | Zagreb, Croatia | 50 | 64 | Evicted |
| Luka "Luća" Mišnić | 33 | Rapper | Belgrade | 2 | 57 | Evicted |
| Branislav Krstić | 30 | Miner | Aleksinac | 1 | 50 | Evicted |
| Steffani Banić | 20 | High school graduated | Split, Croatia | 1 | 45 | Walked |
| Ivona Milovanović | 25 | Hostess and call center employee | Jagodina | 2 | 43 | Evicted |
| Vesna Bartolić | 60 | Retired | Zadar, Croatia | 22 | 36 | Evicted |
| Anton Kopajtić | 63 | Retired | Ogulin/Zagreb, Croatia | 2 | 29 | Evicted |
| Aleksandar Ralević | 22 | Dog trainer | Berane, Montenegro | 1 | 22 | Evicted |
| Andrea Jakimovska | 43 | Former police officer | Tetovo, North Macedonia | 1 | 15 | Evicted |

== Nominations table ==
| | Week 1 | Week 2 | Week 3 | Week 4 | Week 5 | Week 6 | Week 7 | Week 8 | Week 9 | Week 10 | Week 11 | Week 12 | | Week 13 | Week 14 | | |
| | Week 1 | Week 2 | Week 3 | Week 4 | Week 5 | Week 6 | Week 7 | Week 8 | Week 9 | Week 10 | Week 11 | Day 78 | Day 85 | Week 13 | Day 99 | Final | |
|---|---|---|---|---|---|---|---|---|---|---|---|---|---|---|---|---|---|
| Spejko | —N/a | —N/a | Luka; Branislav | Anton/Goran; Giba/Mika | Goran; Vesna | Tina | Steffani; Goran | Goran; Zorica | Đorđe; Jozefina | Goran; Đorđe | Goran; Đorđe | Goran; Zorica | Goran; Zorica | No; Nominations | No; Nominations | Winner (Day 100) | |
| Goran | —N/a | Zorica; Tina | Zorica; Spejko | Luka/Zorica; Branislav/Ivona | Barbara; Mirjana | Exempt | Zorica; Branislav | Luka; Mirjana | Zorica; Barbara | Zorica; Tina | Spejko; Zorica | Spejko; Ervin | Zorica; Spejko | Zorica; Barbara | No; Nominations | Runner-up (Day 100) | |
| Ervin | —N/a | Goran; Luka | Aleksandar; Luka | Anton/Goran; Giba/Mika | Goran; Vesna | Exempt | Branislav; Rada | Mirjana; Zorica | Jozefina; Mirjana | Mirjana; Goran | Mirjana; Đorđe | Goran; Mirjana | Goran; Rada | No; Nominations | No; Nominations | Third place (Day 100) | |
| Barbara | N/A | —N/a | Luka; Giba/Mika | Anton/Goran; Giba/Mika | Goran; Vesna | Tina | Goran; Rada | Goran; Rada | Goran; Đorđe | Mirjana; Goran | Đorđe; Goran | Goran; Rada | Goran; Rada | No; Nominations | No; Nominations | Fourth place (Day 100) | |
| Giba | Barbara; Luka; Zorica | Luka; Goran | Branislav; Ivona | Luka/Zorica; Anton/Goran | Vesna; Zorica | Rada | Branislav; Zorica | Luka; Zorica | Đorđe; Zorica | Goran; Đorđe | Đorđe; Zorica | Goran; Ervin | Goran; Zorica | No; Nominations | No; Nominations | Evicted (Day 99) | |
| Mika | Barbara; Luka; Zorica | Goran; Aleksandar | Branislav; Ivona | Luka/Zorica; Anton/Goran | Vesna; Zorica | Rada | Branislav; Zorica | Luka; Zorica | Đorđe; Zorica | Goran; Đorđe | Đorđe; Zorica | Goran; Ervin | Goran; Zorica | No; Nominations | No; Nominations | Evicted (Day 99) | |
| Zorica | N/A | Goran; Ivona | Luka; Aleksandar | Giba/Mika; Spejko/Tina | Goran; Vesna | Exempt | Goran; Steffani | Mirjana; Luka | Mirjana; Đorđe | Goran; Đorđe | Đorđe; Goran | Goran; Mirjana | Goran; Rada | No; Nominations | No; Nominations | Evicted (Day 99) | |
| Tina | —N/a | Goran; Ivona | Goran; Luka; Aleksandar | Anton/Goran; Giba/Mika | Goran; Vesna | Barbara | Goran; Rada | Goran; Zorica | Goran; Đorđe | Goran; Mirjana | Đorđe; Goran | Goran; Mirjana | Goran; Rada | No; Nominations | No; Nominations | Evicted (Day 99) | |
| Rada | Barbara; Luka; Zorica | Luka; Goran | Secret; Room | | Luka; Ivona | Giba & Mika | Zorica; Branislav | Spejko; Mirjana | Zorica; Đorđe | Radivoje; Goran | Zorica; Đorđe | Ervin; Spejko | Zorica; Goran | No; Nominations | Evicted (Day 92) | | |
| Mirjana | Not in House | | | Luka/Zorica; Anton/Goran | Branislav; Vesna | Exempt | Luka; Barbara; Branislav | Zorica; Goran | Đorđe; Zorica | Tina; Đorđe | Ervin; Zorica | Barbara; Ervin | Evicted (Day 85) | | | | |
| Đorđe | Not in House | | | | | | | Exempt | Mirjana; Zorica | Zorica; Mirjana | Spejko; Zorica | Evicted (Day 78) | | | | | |
| Radivoje | Barbara; Luka; Zorica | Luka; Goran | Secret; Room | | Vesna; Goran | Giba & Mika | Zorica; Branislav | Luka; Mirjana | Zorica; Đorđe | Zorica; Tina | Evicted (Day 71) | | | | | | |
| Jozefina | Not in House | | | | | | | Exempt | Goran; Đorđe | Evicted (Day 64) | | | | | | | |
| Luka | N/A | Tina; Zorica | Zorica; Giba/Mika | Giba/Mika; Spejko/Tina | Zorica; Vesna | Exempt | Steffani; Ervin | Zorica; Goran | Evicted (Day 57) | | | | | | | | |
| Branislav | —N/a | —N/a | Barbara; Zorica | Giba/Mika; Anton/Goran | Vesna; Goran | Exempt | Steffani; Goran | Evicted (Day 50) | | | | | | | | | |
| Steffani | —N/a | Luka; Goran | Secret; Room | | Barbara; Zorica | Exempt | Rada; Branislav | Walked (Day 45) | | | | | | | | | |
| Ivona | —N/a | Andrea; Zorica | Aleksandar; Branislav | Giba/Mika; Anton/Goran | Vesna; Goran | Tina | Evicted (Day 43) | | | | | | | | | | |
| Vesna | Not in House | | | Luka/Zorica; Branislav/Ivona | Zorica; Mirjana | Evicted (Day 36) | | | | | | | | | | | |
| Anton | —N/a | —N/a | Luka; Aleksandar | Luka/Zorica; Branislav/Ivona | Evicted (Day 29) | | | | | | | | | | | | |
| Aleksandar | —N/a | Zorica; Anton | Zorica; Ervin | Evicted (Day 22) | | | | | | | | | | | | | |
| Andrea | —N/a | Spejko; Zorica | Evicted (Day 15) | | | | | | | | | | | | | | |
| Notes | 1, 2, 3 | 4, 5, 6 | 7, 8 | 8, 9, 10 | 8, 11, 12 | 8, 13 | 14, 15 | 16, 17 | none | 18 | none | | 19 | 20 | 21 | 22 | |
| Head of House | none | Barbara | Tina | none | | | Mirjana | none | | | | | | | | | |
| Up for eviction | Barbara; Goran; Luka; Steffani; Zorica | Andrea; Goran; Ivona; Luka | Aleksandar; Branislav; Goran; Luka; Zorica | Anton; Giba & Mika; Goran | Barbara; Goran; Vesna | Barbara; Ivona; Giba & Mika; Rada; Radivoje; Spejko | Barbara; Branislav; Goran; Luka; ~~Steffani~~; Zorica | Goran; Luka; Mirjana; Zorica | Đorđe; Goran; Jozefina; Mirjana; Zorica | Barbara; Đorđe; Ervin; Giba & Mika; Rada; Radivoje; Spejko; Tina | Đorđe; Goran; Zorica | Ervin; Goran; Mirjana; Spejko | none | Ervin; Giba & Mika; Goran; Rada; Spejko; Tina | Barbara; Ervin; Giba & Mika; Goran; Spejko; Tina; Zorica | Barbara; Ervin; Goran; Spejko | |
| Walked | none | | | | | | Steffani | none | | | | | | | | | |
| Evicted | Steffani; Chosen to fake evict | Andrea; Fewest votes to save | Aleksandar; Fewest votes to save | Anton; Fewest votes to save | Vesna; Fewest votes to save | Ivona; Fewest votes to save | Branislav; Fewest votes to save | Luka; Fewest votes to save | Jozefina; Fewest votes to save | Radivoje; Fewest votes to save | Đorđe; Fewest votes to save | Mirjana; Fewest votes to save | Goran; 13 of 24 points to fake evict | Rada; Fewest votes to save | Tina; Fewest votes (out of 7) | Barbara; Fewest votes (out of 4) | Ervin; Fewest votes (out of 3) |
| Evicted | Steffani; Chosen to fake evict | Andrea; Fewest votes to save | Aleksandar; Fewest votes to save | Anton; Fewest votes to save | Vesna; Fewest votes to save | Ivona; Fewest votes to save | Branislav; Fewest votes to save | Luka; Fewest votes to save | Jozefina; Fewest votes to save | Radivoje; Fewest votes to save | Đorđe; Fewest votes to save | Mirjana; Fewest votes to save | Goran; 13 of 24 points to fake evict | Rada; Fewest votes to save | Zorica; Fewest votes (out of 6) | Goran; Fewest votes (out of 2) | |
| Evicted | Steffani; Chosen to fake evict | Andrea; Fewest votes to save | Aleksandar; Fewest votes to save | Anton; Fewest votes to save | Vesna; Fewest votes to save | Ivona; Fewest votes to save | Branislav; Fewest votes to save | Luka; Fewest votes to save | Jozefina; Fewest votes to save | Radivoje; Fewest votes to save | Đorđe; Fewest votes to save | Mirjana; Fewest votes to save | Goran; 13 of 24 points to fake evict | Rada; Fewest votes to save | Giba & Mika; Fewest votes (out of 5) | Spejko; Most votes to win | |

=== Notes ===
– House Captain
– Automatically nominated by housemate in power
– Immunity
– In the Secret Room
– Fake eviction

- ^Note 1: The Vasić family is living in a secret room, without the other housemates knowing.
- ^Note 2: The housemates nominated. However, these nominations were fake, and it was the Vasić family who decided who was up for eviction (Barbara, Luka and Zorica). However, most of the housemates voted for Goran and Steffani so, to keep them from getting suspicious, Big Brother decided to put the two of them up for eviction as well.
- ^Note 3: The Vasić family chose to evict Steffani and have her move in with them. However, they had to choose one of them to move to the Main House. They chose Mika.
- ^Note 4: The housemates in the Secret Room nominated as only one housemate.
- ^Note 5: As HoH, Barbara decided to save Zorica. Andrea and Luka both had the next highest number of points and therefore were nominated.
- ^Note 6: The nominations of certain houseguests were not shown for unknown reasons.
- ^Note 7: As HoH, Tina got to nominate one houseguest directly. She chose Goran.
- ^Note 8: Giba and Mika are a 2-in-1 housemate, and thus nominate and are nominated together.
- ^Note 9: Mirjana and Vesna entered the house on day 22.
- ^Note 10: The task of the fourth week was a "perfect relationship" and the contestants are divided into pairs. Pairs were: Spejko and Tina; Branislav and Ivona; Ervin and Barbara; Luka and Zorica; Giba, Mika and Mirjana; Anton, Goran and Vesna. Instead of the standard nominations, now the competitors are nominated in pairs and nominated pairs. Vesna and Mirjana, as new housemates had immunity.
- ^Note 11: Steffani, Rada and Radivoje returned to the Main House.
- ^Note 12: As the "Perfect Pair" task winners, Spejko and Tina were given immunity from nominations. As Barbara and Ervin came second, they won double points to nominate.
- ^Note 13: Housemates were divided into two teams this week, and the team of Zorica (Ervin, Goran, Luka, Mirjana, Steffani and Zorica) won so they were immune for the week. The losing team of Rada (Barbara, Branislav, Giba & Mika, Ivona, Rada, Radivoje, Spejko and Tina) was nominated. However, each of them voted to save one of them from nomination. Tina had the most votes and escaped from nomination.
- ^Note 14: As HoH, Mirjana had to give immunity to 3 housemates. She gave it to Giba & Mika, Radivoje and herself. Then, she had to automatically nominate 3 housemates. She nominated Luka, Barbara and Ivona. After the housemates nominated, she had to automatically nominate another housemate, because Ivona has been already evicted. She nominated Branislav, who would be nominated anyway.
- ^Note 15: Tina and Steffani received 3 and 2 extra points from Big Brother respectively.
- ^Note 16: Housemates were divided into two teams this week, and the Yellow team (Barbara, Branislav, Luka, Mirjana, Rade and Spejko) lost and Big Brother to them in following nominations all added two points.
- ^Note 17: Big Brother gave two points to Luka for violating rules about nominations.
- ^Note 18: Goran, Mirjana and Zorica had the most nominations, however in a twist they were the only saved housemates this week.
- ^Note 19: Housemates were told the one with the most points would be evicted. The vote was done face-to-face, and Goran received the most points. However, he went to a Secret Room instead of being evicted.
- ^Note 20: Big Brother gave Goran opportunity to nominate two housemates for eviction, however in a twist, they got immunity and were first finalists of this season. He nominates Zorica and Barbara.
- ^Note 21: Three of seven finalists were evicted, four remaining became super-finalists on Day 99.
- ^Note 22: Super-final of Veliki Brat 2015 on Day 100.
