= Evelin Novak =

Croatian soprano (born 1985)

Evelin Novak (born 1985 in Čakovec) is a Croatian soprano. Novak was born in Croatia. At the age of 12 she started her singing education, four years later she won two first prizes at international competitions in Croatia. At the age of 17 she became the youngest student at the Music Academy in Graz, Austria. Afterwards she studied at the State University of Music and Performing Arts Stuttgart with Dunja Vejzović, where she received her diploma in spring 2008.

== Biography ==
From April 2009 until June 2011, Novak was holding a scholarship of the Liz Mohn Kultur- und Musikstiftung at the International Operastudio of the Staatsoper Unter den Linden in Berlin. In the 2009/10 season she sang on the opera stage Servant in Simon Boccanegra, Berta in Il Barbiere di Siviglia and Kate Pinkerton in Madama Butterfly. The season 2010/11 included additionally 1. Dame/Die Zauberflöte, Tebaldo/Don Carlo, Arminda/La finta giardiniera and Die Vertraute/Elektra.

She gave her debut as Berta/Il Barbiere di Siviglia at the Bayerische Staatsoper München in March 2010.

In the summer of 2011 Novak gave her debut with Saffi in Der Zigeunerbaron (director: Brigitte Fassbaender) at the Seefestspiele Mörbisch (recorded for TV and DVD).

Since season 2011/12 she is a member of Staatsoper Berlin, where she made her debut as Eurydike/Orphée aux enfers in December 2011, followed in season 2012/13 by her first Pamina in Mozart's Die Zauberflöte, as well as the new production of Frank Martin's Le Vin herbé, followed in 2014 by Jenny/Mahagonny (new production). She also sang her first Violetta/La traviata there.

In summer 2012 she made her debut as Micaëla in Bizet's Carmen at the Opernfestspiele St. Margarethen, Austria, also recorded for DVD. The year after she sang her first Mimì/La bohéme there. Further guest appearances led her to Graz (Gasparone) and Barcelona Liceu (Micaëla/Carmen production Calixto Bieito).

Novak is also a regular guest on numerous concert stages in Germany and her home country Croatia, e.g. with the Zagreb Philharmonic Orchestra. In autumn 2011, she appeared with Dvořák's Stabat Mater at Theater Heidelberg. She sang concerts under Daniel Barenboim at Berlin Philharmonie. She recorded La rondine in Munich for the Bayerischer Rundfunk.
