= Big Brother (Croatian TV series) season 1 =

Season of the Croatian television series

Big Brother
- Season 1
- Presented by: Daria Knez
- No. of days: 100
- No. of housemates: 14
- Winner: Saša Tkalčević
- Runner-up: Zdravko Lamot

Release
- Original network: RTL
- Original release: 18 September – 26 December 2004

Season chronology
- Next → Big Brother 2

Big Brother 1 is the first season of the Croatian reality television series Big Brother that premiered on 18 September 2004 and ending on 26 December 2004 and ran for 100 days. It received high ratings and proved to be one of the rare successes for RTL Televizija in its first six months on Croatian television markets.

Despite the huge commercial success and becoming a cultural phenomenon of its season, the first season was subjected to much criticism. Andrija Hebrang, Croatian health minister at the time, complained about contestants smoking while the programme on air, which was against Croatian laws. In response to this, later live broadcasts were time-delayed. The show also created minor controversy due to a single homophobic statement ("If I knew I had a fag friend, I would kill him. I would kill him") made by Zdravko Lamot.

Other critics complained about lack of diversity among contestants who didn't represent the average of Croatian population. They were mostly all in the mid-20s, attending college, having a liberal mindset and coming from well-to-do or upper-middle-class families. Another exception was Saša Tkalčević, a 32-year-old biker from Bjelovar, husband and father of two children. He almost immediately established himself as the frontrunner, indicating that the audience for the show and pool of potential voters was much older than previously thought.

In this first season, there were 12 original housemates. Later, two new housemates entered the house.

Antonija Blaće who was evicted one week before the final is since then one of the most popular TV hosts in Croatia.

== Nominations table ==
	Week 2	Week 4	Week 5	Week 7	Week 9	Week 10	Week 11	Week 12	Week 13	Week 14 Final		Nominations received
Saša	Egle, Filip	Alen, Marina	Alen, Marina	Antonija, Vlatka	Antonija, Sanja	Antonija, Marina	Antonija, Marina	Antonija, Valentina	Antonija, Marina	Winner (Day 100)		7
Zdravko	Ozren, Sanja	Krešo, Ozren	Antonija, Sanja	Sanja, Vlatka	Marina, Sanja	Antonija, Marina	Antonija, Valentina	Antonija, Valentina	Antonija, Marina	Runner-up (Day 100)		13
Alen	Ana, Filip	Ana, Ozren	Filip, Valentina	Vlatka, Željko	Sanja, Valentina	Ana, Valentina	Ana, Antonija	Antonija, Valentina	Antonija, Saša	Third place (Day 100)		20
Marina	Egle, Ozren	Ozren, Sanja	Sanja, Zdravko	Vlatka, Željko	Sanja, Željko	Saša, Željko	Alen, Ana	Antonija, Saša	Saša, Zdravko	Fourth place (Day 100)		17
Antonija	Alen, Zdravko	Alen, Ozren	Filip, Zdravko	Saša, Zdravko	Alen, Željko	Alen, Željko	Alen, Zdravko	Marina, Saša	Saša, Zdravko	Evicted (Day 91)		18
Valentina	Egle, Ozren	Krešo, Ozren	Alen, Filip	Alen, Vlatka	Ana, Željko	Alen, Željko	Alen, Ana	Alen, Zdravko	Evicted (Day 84)			9
Ana	Alen, Egle	Filip, Ozren	Filip, Marina	Vlatka, Željko	Alen, Željko	Alen, Željko	Alen, Marina	Evicted (Day 77)				10
Željko	Not in House		Exempt	Ana, Antonija	Alen, Marina	Alen, Valentina	Evicted (Day 70)					12
Sanja	Alen, Egle	Marina, Zdravko	Marina, Zdravko	Ana, Vlatka	Marina, Željko	Evicted (Day 63)						9
Vlatka	Not in House		Exempt	Marina, Zdravko	Evicted (Day 49)							7
Filip	Antonija, Ozren	Krešo, Ozren	Antonija, Valentina	Evicted (Day 35)								7
Ozren	Krešo, Zdravko	Marina, Zdravko	Walked (Day 23)									14
Krešo	Egle, Ozren	Ana, Ozren	Ejected (Day 22)									5
Egle	Krešo, Ozren	Evicted (Day 14)										6
Notes	none	1	2	none						3		
Nominated	Egle, Ozren	Krešo, Marina, Orzen	Filip, Marina, Zdravko	Vlatka, Željko	Sanja, Željko	Alen, Željko	Alen, Ana, Antonija	Antonija, Valentina	Antonija, Saša	Alen, Marina, Saša, Zdravko		
Ejected	none	Krešo	none									
Walked	none	Ozren	none									
Evicted	Egle; 71% to evict	Eviction cancelled	Filip; 55% to evict	Vlatka; 84% to evict	Sanja; 73% to evict	Željko; 64% to evict	Ana; 51% to evict	Valentina; 63% to evict	Antonija; 80% to evict	Marina; 6% to win	Alen; 7% to win	
Evicted	Egle; 71% to evict	Eviction cancelled	Filip; 55% to evict	Vlatka; 84% to evict	Sanja; 73% to evict	Željko; 64% to evict	Ana; 51% to evict	Valentina; 63% to evict	Antonija; 80% to evict	Zdravko; 10% to win	Saša; 77% to win	

=== Notes ===
- ^Note 1 : After Krešo left the House on Day 22, the public vote was suspended and the eviction was cancelled.
- ^Note 2 : As new Housemates, Željko and Vlatko were exempt from the nominations process this week.
- ^Note 3 : This week, the public were voting for a winner, rather than to evict.
