= Jelena Radan =

Croatian singer

- Born: August 23, 1974 (age 52); Zagreb, Croatia
- Genres: Pop, fado
- Occupations: Singer, songwriter
- Instrument: Vocals
- Years active: 2003–present
- Labels: Scardona; Menart

Jelena Radan (born 23 August 1974) is a Croatian singer and songwriter. She has released both pop and fado albums, earning her several Porin Awards. Radan is best known for her hit single "Leti do snova". In addition to her music career, she served as a judge on the first season of Star Search Croatia in 2009.

== Career ==
Radan served as a judge on the first season of Star Search Croatia, which aired from February to June 2009.

Her fourth studio album, Voyage, was released in 2013 through Menart and showcased a multilingual approach and reflected on her journey with the fado genre. On 11 April 2017, Radan released a new single titled "Nismo više isti k'o prije," marking her continued work as a singer-songwriter. On 21 November 2022, Radan held a concert with the Zagreb Philharmonic Orchestra at the Vatroslav Lisinski Concert Hall, performing both her pop and fado repertoire. On 5 December 2024, Radan was announced as one of 24 participants in Dora 2025, the Croatian national selection for the Eurovision Song Contest 2025, with the song "Salut!".

== Personal life ==
Since 2011, Radan has been in a relationship with Croatian sculptor and painter Boris Sekulić. In an interview with InMagazin, Radan described her relationship with Sekulić as something that "just happened" and stated that they do not focus on their age difference, saying, "We don't wake up and say, 'Hmm, now you are 15 years older, and I'm younger. Everything has its challenges, advantages, and disadvantages, but we simply live it". The couple welcomed their daughter, Maša, in January 2014.

== Discography ==
=== Albums ===
==== Studio albums ====
Title	Details
Nije kraj	Released: 2003; Label: Scardona; Formats: CD, digital download, streaming
Novi dan	Released: 2006; Label: Scardona; Formats: CD, digital download, streaming
Sjeti me se, ljube	Released: 2011; Label: Menart; Formats: CD, digital download, streaming
Voyage	Released: 2013; Label: Menart; Formats: CD, digital download, streaming

==== Extended plays ====
Title	Details
Jelena	Released: 2002; Label: Scardona; Formats: CD, digital download, streaming

==== Live albums ====
Title	Details
Moja potraga za fadom	Released: 2005; Label: Scardona; Formats: CD, digital download, streaming
Fado na Peristulu	Released: 2008; Label: Scardona; Formats: CD, DVD, digital download, streaming

=== Singles ===
Title	Year	Peak chart positions	Album
Title	Year	CRO	Album
"Pođi na put" (with Fluentes)	2015	—	non-album singles
"Kad nas više ne bude"	2016	—	non-album singles
"Nismo više isti k'o i prije"	2017	—	non-album singles
"Negdje tamo gore"	2018	33	non-album singles
"Samo me ljubi"	2019	—	non-album singles
"—" denotes a single that did not chart or was not released in that territory.

== Awards and nominations ==
Year	Association	Category	Nominee / work	Result	Ref.
2014	Porin	Best Female Vocal Performance	Voyage	Nominated	
2014	Porin	Best Recording Package	Voyage	Won	
2016	Porin	Best Children's Music Album	Mjesto za mene	Won	
