= Kim Verson =

- Born: 2 September 1993 (age 32); Nova Gradiška, Croatia
- Genres: Pop
- Occupation: Singer
- Instrument: Vocals
- Years active: 2010–present
- Label: Dallas Records

Kim Verson (born 2 September 1993) is a female Croatian singer known for being the winner of the second season of the TV show Hrvatska traži zvijezdu in 2010.

She released her first album Vjeruj u snove in September 2010 on Dallas Records. The biggest hits are "Ponovno rođena" and "Nevidljivo blago". Her second album, Vrati mi moj svijet, was released in 2018.

== Discography ==
- Vjeruj u snove (2010)
- Vrati mi moj svijet (2018)
