= Klasik TV =

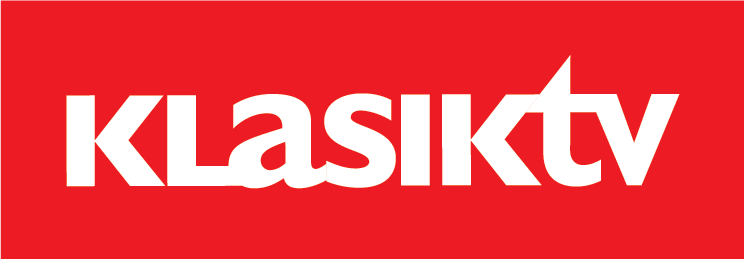

Klasik TV is a Croatian 24-hour film channel that was launched by Televizija Classicum d.o.o. in 2010. The channel broadcasts Yugoslav films and is available in Croatia, Bosnia and Herzegovina, Montenegro, North Macedonia, Serbia and Slovenia.
