= Star Search Croatia season 2 =

Star Search Croatia
- Season 2
- Hosted by: Antonija Blaće
- Judges: Tony Cetinski, Anđa Marić (Jelena Radan), Goran Lisica-Fox
- Winner: Kim Verson
- Runner-up: Vilibald Kovač

Release
- Original network: RTL Televizija
- Original release: January 2010 – June 6, 2010

Season chronology
- ← Previous; Season 1

Star Search Croatia (Croatian: Hrvatska traži zvijezdu) Season 2 is the second season of the second Croatian version of Pop Idol, broadcast in 2010.

Auditions were held in the four biggest cities of the country: Zagreb, Rijeka, Osijek and Split. Tony Cetinski and Goran Lisica returned as judges while Jelena Radan was replaced by Anđa Marić during the auditions.

== Finals elimination chart ==
Stage:		Top 16	Finals								
Week:		4/2	4/9	4/16	4/23	4/30	5/7	5/14	5/21	5/28	6/4
Place	Contestant	Result									
1	Kim Verson	Viewers			Btm 2						Winner
2	Vilibald Kovač	Viewers								Btm 2	Runner-Up
3	Duje Stanišić	Viewers	Btm 2					Btm 2	Btm 2	Elim	
4	Juraj Jurlina	Judges					Btm 2		Elim		
5	Jurica Gorša	Viewers				Btm 2		Elim			
6	Maja Malić	Judges		Btm 2			Elim				
7	Petar Brkljačić	Viewers				Elim					
8	Adrijana Baković	Viewers			Elim						
9	Helena Hunčaga	Judges		Elim							
10	Dino Antonić	Viewers	Elim								
11-16	Boris Rogoznica	Elim									
11-16	Hana Blažević	Elim									
11-16	Isabella Kim Popović	Elim									
11-16	Ivana Trogrlić	Elim									
11-16	Pjerino Ružević	Elim									
11-16	Zdenka Olujić	Elim									

Legend
Female	Male	Top 10	Top 16

Note: "Bottom two" consists of two contestants: one who received the fewest votes and one who is randomly picked by not being called as the qualifier before the other contestants.
