= Antonija Blaće =

Croatian radio and television presenter

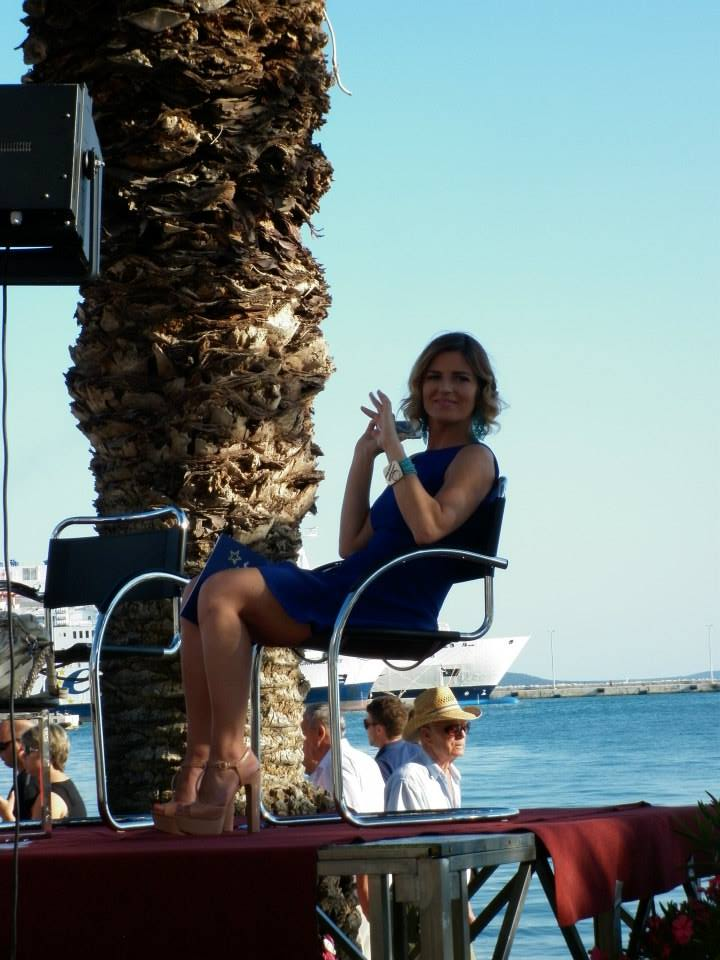
- Born: 2 October 1979 (age 47); Šibenik, SR Croatia, SFR Yugoslavia (modern Croatia)
- Other name: Antonija Brlečić
- Occupation: TV host
- Television: RTL Televizija; Narodni radio
- Spouse: Hrvoje Brlečić (m. 2015)

Antonija Brlečić (born 2 October 1979), better known under her maiden surname Blaće, is a Croatian TV host who works for RTL Televizija and Narodni radio. She rose to fame as a contestant of first Croatian season of Big Brother, getting evicted from the Big Brother house a week before the show's final. She became a regular host since the second season and has since hosted every season of the show.

Other than Big Brother, she hosted the first two seasons of Croatian version of Idols franchise (Star Search Croatia), X Factor Adria, Fear Factor, the culinary show Večera za 5, and Uhvati Bingo Ritam. In 2022, she hosted the first season of the Croatian version of Masked Singer and became a jury member in the show's second season a year later.

== Personal life ==
She was born in Šibenik in the family of her father Ante Blaće who originally comes from Crnica, a suburb of Šibenik. She has one sister. In 2015, she married Croatian water polo player Hrvoje Brlečić.

== Sources ==
- http://www.rtl.hr/antonija-blace-voditelj-4 (in Croatian)
