= Jelena Rozga discography =

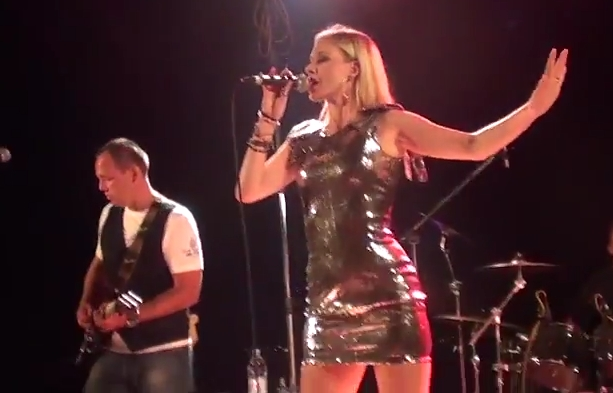
- Jelena Rozga performing during a concert in 2011
- Studio albums: 3
- Compilation albums: 3
- Singles: 42

Croatian singer Jelena Rozga has released 3 studio albums, two compilations, 42 singles and 30 music videos.

== Studio albums ==
Year	Album	Peak position	Certification
Year	Album	CRO	Certification
2006	Oprosti Mala: released: 2006.; record label: Croatia Records, Tonika; format: CD, cassette, digital download, streaming	1	
2011	Bižuterija: released: 2011.; record label: Hit Records, Tonika; format: CD, digitalni download, streaming	1	CRO: Gold
2016	Moderna žena: released: 2016.; record label: Croatia Records, Tonika; format: CD, digitalni download, streaming	1	CRO: Gold
"—" denotes the album was not released in the country or did not manage to place on the chart.

== Compilation albums ==
Year	Album	Peak position	Certification
Year	Album	CRO	Certification
2011	Best of Jelena Rozga: Record label: Croatia Records, Tonika; Formats: CD, digital download, streaming	1	CRO: Gold
2017	Jelena Rozga: Record label: Croatia Records, Tonika; Formats: DVD	—	
2022	Minut Srca Mog: record label: Croatia Records, Tonika; formati: CD, digital download, streaming	1	
"—" denotes the album was not released in the country or did not manage to place on the chart.

== Singles ==
Title	Year	Peak chart positions		Album
Title	Year	CRO		Album
Title	Year	Top 100	CRO Billb.	Album
"Oprosti mala"	2006	(Note: HR Top 40 was launched on 24 January 2013.)	(Note: Croatia Songs was launched on 15 February 2022.)	Oprosti mala
"Ne zovi me Marija"	2006	(Note: HR Top 40 was launched on 24 January 2013.)	(Note: Croatia Songs was launched on 15 February 2022.)	Oprosti mala
"Ja znam dobro što mi je"	2006	(Note: HR Top 40 was launched on 24 January 2013.)	(Note: Croatia Songs was launched on 15 February 2022.)	Oprosti mala
"Sve se meni čini"	2006	(Note: HR Top 40 was launched on 24 January 2013.)	(Note: Croatia Songs was launched on 15 February 2022.)	Oprosti mala
"Nemam" (with Zlatko Pejaković)	2007	(Note: HR Top 40 was launched on 24 January 2013.)	(Note: Croatia Songs was launched on 15 February 2022.)	Oprosti mala
"Gospe moja"	2007	(Note: HR Top 40 was launched on 24 January 2013.)	(Note: Croatia Songs was launched on 15 February 2022.)	Oprosti mala
"Svega ima, al' bi još"	2008	(Note: HR Top 40 was launched on 24 January 2013.)	(Note: Croatia Songs was launched on 15 February 2022.)	Bižuterija
"Djevica"	2008	(Note: HR Top 40 was launched on 24 January 2013.)	(Note: Croatia Songs was launched on 15 February 2022.)	Bižuterija
"Daj šta daš"	2008	(Note: HR Top 40 was launched on 24 January 2013.)	(Note: Croatia Songs was launched on 15 February 2022.)	Bižuterija
"Ožiljak"	2008	(Note: HR Top 40 was launched on 24 January 2013.)	(Note: Croatia Songs was launched on 15 February 2022.)	Bižuterija
"Rodit ću ti 'ćer i sina"	2009	(Note: HR Top 40 was launched on 24 January 2013.)	(Note: Croatia Songs was launched on 15 February 2022.)	Bižuterija
"Nevjeran do groba" (with Miligram)	2009	(Note: HR Top 40 was launched on 24 January 2013.)	(Note: Croatia Songs was launched on 15 February 2022.)	Miligram
"Ima nade" (with Željko Samardžić)	2010	(Note: HR Top 40 was launched on 24 January 2013.)	(Note: Croatia Songs was launched on 15 February 2022.)	Bižuterija
"Bižuterija"	2010	(Note: HR Top 40 was launched on 24 January 2013.)	(Note: Croatia Songs was launched on 15 February 2022.)	Bižuterija
"Karantena"	2011	(Note: HR Top 40 was launched on 24 January 2013.)	(Note: Croatia Songs was launched on 15 February 2022.)	Bižuterija
"Ona ili ja"	2011	(Note: HR Top 40 was launched on 24 January 2013.)	(Note: Croatia Songs was launched on 15 February 2022.)	Bižuterija
"Dalmatinka" (with Connect)	2011	(Note: HR Top 40 was launched on 24 January 2013.)	(Note: Croatia Songs was launched on 15 February 2022.)	Moderna žena
"Razmažena"	2011	(Note: HR Top 40 was launched on 24 January 2013.)	(Note: Croatia Songs was launched on 15 February 2022.)	Moderna žena
"Zanemari"	2012	(Note: HR Top 40 was launched on 24 January 2013.)	(Note: Croatia Songs was launched on 15 February 2022.)	Moderna žena
"Solo igračica"	2012	(Note: HR Top 40 was launched on 24 January 2013.)	(Note: Croatia Songs was launched on 15 February 2022.)	Moderna žena
"Dobitna kombinacija"	2012	(Note: HR Top 40 was launched on 24 January 2013.)	(Note: Croatia Songs was launched on 15 February 2022.)	Moderna žena
"Nirvana"	2013	16	(Note: Croatia Songs was launched on 15 February 2022.)	Moderna žena
"Obožavam"	2013	4	(Note: Croatia Songs was launched on 15 February 2022.)	Moderna žena
"Cirkus"	2013	2	(Note: Croatia Songs was launched on 15 February 2022.)	Moderna žena
"Prsti zapleteni" (with Klapa Rišpet)	2014	4	(Note: Croatia Songs was launched on 15 February 2022.)	Moderna žena
"Okus mentola"	2014	15	(Note: Croatia Songs was launched on 15 February 2022.)	Moderna žena
"Život je čudo"	2014	24	(Note: Croatia Songs was launched on 15 February 2022.)	Moderna žena
"Odo' ja"	2014	7	(Note: Croatia Songs was launched on 15 February 2022.)	Moderna žena
"Tsunami"	2014	6	(Note: Croatia Songs was launched on 15 February 2022.)	Moderna žena
"Kraljica"	2015	25	(Note: Croatia Songs was launched on 15 February 2022.)	Moderna žena
"Otrov"	2015	17	(Note: Croatia Songs was launched on 15 February 2022.)	Moderna žena
"Udajem se"	2016	2	(Note: Croatia Songs was launched on 15 February 2022.)	Moderna žena
"Nasljednik"	2016	13	(Note: Croatia Songs was launched on 15 February 2022.)	Moderna žena
"Pismo-Glava"	2016	5	(Note: Croatia Songs was launched on 15 February 2022.)	Moderna žena
"Moderna Žena"	2016	20	(Note: Croatia Songs was launched on 15 February 2022.)	Moderna žena
"Žileti"	2017	35	(Note: Croatia Songs was launched on 15 February 2022.)	Moderna žena
"Ne Pijem, Ne Pušim"	2017	10	(Note: Croatia Songs was launched on 15 February 2022.)	Moderna žena
"Najbolji dan"	2018	7	(Note: Croatia Songs was launched on 15 February 2022.)	Non-album singles
"Uzmem koliko mi daš"	2018	2	(Note: Croatia Songs was launched on 15 February 2022.)	Non-album singles
"Ostani"	2018	31	(Note: Croatia Songs was launched on 15 February 2022.)	Non-album singles
"Moje Proljeće"	2019	3	(Note: Croatia Songs was launched on 15 February 2022.)	Non-album singles
"Sveto Pismo"	2020	5	(Note: Croatia Songs was launched on 15 February 2022.)	Non-album singles
"Kad nema ljubavi"	2020	—	(Note: Croatia Songs was launched on 15 February 2022.)	Non-album singles
"Ti i Ja" (with Saša Matić)	2021	— (Note: "Ti i ja" was released through a Serbian record label and thus wasn't eligible to chart on the HR Top 40, but charted it at number 93 on the Airplay Radio Chart.)	9	Dva života
"Zar je ljubav spala na to" (with Matija Cvek)	2022	4	—	Minut Srca Mog
"Samo se ljubit' isplati"	2022	3	—	Non-album singles
"Idi Ti"	2023	12	—	Non-album singles
"Od Čega Sam Ja"	2024	9	—	Non-album singles
"Lavica"	2024	2	23	Non-album singles
"Začarani krug"	2025	4	—	Non-album singles
"Ljubi me"	2026	3	—	Non-album singles
"—" denotes the album was not released in the country or did not manage to place on the chart.

== Music videos ==
Year	Music video
2006	Sve se meni čini
2007	Gospe moja
2010	Ima nade (feat. Željko Samardžić)
2010	Bižuterija
2011	Karantena
2011	Ona ili ja
2011	Dalmatinka (feat. Connect)
2011	Razmažena
2012	Zanemari
2012	Solo igračica - Dobitna kombinacija
2013	Nirvana
2013	Cirkus
2014	Prsti zapleteni (feat. Klapa Rišpet)
2014	Okus mentola
2014	Život je čudo
2014	Odo' ja
2014	Tsunami
2015	Kraljica
2015	Otrov
2016.	Udajem se
2016.	Nasljednik
2016.	Pismo-glava
2016.	Moderna žena
2017	Žileti
2017	Ne pijem, ne pušim
2018	Najbolji dan
2018	Uzmem koliko mi daš
2018	Ostani
2019	Moje proljeće
2020	Sveto Pismo

Title	Year	Director(s)	Ref.
As lead artist
"Zar je ljubav spala na to"	2022	Dario Radusin	
"Samo se ljubit' isplati"	2022	Luka Sepčić	
As featured artist
"Ti i ja"	2021	—	
