= Minut Srca Mog Tour =

2022–24 concert tour by Jelena Rozga

- Tour by Jelena Rozga
- Promotional poster for concert in Zagreb at Arena Zagreb, December 2022
- Location: Europe
- Associated album: Minut Srca Mog
- Start date: 17 December 2022
- End date: 2 November 2024
- Legs: 1
- No. of shows: 30

Jelena Rozga concert chronology
- Karlovačko live 2011. (2011); Minut Srca Mog Tour (2022–24); ...

The Minut Srca Mog Tour (formerly Rozga Tour) is the third concert tour by Croatian pop singer Jelena Rozga in promotion of her third compilation album Minut Srca Mog (2022). The tour was announced on 20 May 2022 with a first concert starting at the Zagreb Arena in Zagreb, Croatia on 17 December 2022, and is set to conclude on 2 November 2024 at the Zetra Olympic Hall in Sarajevo. The tour was also announced to visit other major cities in other Balkan countries, such as Split, Belgrade, Skopje, Sarajevo and more. Preparation for the tour started in 2022 and Rozga announced it as the biggest production undertaking of her career. Žiga Sotlar served as the show's choreographer and the fashion duo eNVy room served as the main fashion designer for the singer's looks.

The three-hour long concerts which were also divided into three conceptual parts and included three costume changes consisted of songs spanning the singer's solo career and songs she recorded as the lead singer of pop band Magazin. The initial concerts received stellar reviews from music critics who praised the vocal energy, production and choreography with which they dubbed it the singer's highlight in her 27-year long music career. The two initial concerts of the tour were sold-out briefly after their announcement.

== Background ==
Jelena Rozga first announced working on an acoustic album during interviews in 2019 after the success of her acoustic medley performance of three of her songs "Oprosti mala", "Opijum" and "S druge strane mjeseca" on narodni radio's YouTube channel. In 2022, she announced that the album was nearing finalization and on 15 September that same year, she confirmed that the title of her third compilation album and first acoustic album would be Minut Srca Mog in reference to the 1996 eponymous Magazin single "Minut srca tvog". The first acoustic cover of the song, "Zar je ljubav spala na to" featuring Matija Cvek and produced by Srđan Sekulović – Skansi, was released on the same day along with a music video. On 21 October 2022, "Grizem", originally from Rozga's second studio album Bižuterija (2011), was released as the second single off the album along with a visuals video directed by Dario Radusin. On 14 November, Minut Srca Mog was made available on both YouTube and other streaming platforms; the album features 19 songs recorded during the singer's time as the lead singer of the group Magazin and from her solo career as well as a cover of Croatian singer Minea's song "Rano" from the album Mino zakona. All songs, with the exception of the first single were included in their original form, played and performed live with the addition of instruments such as strings, French harmonicas and Mediterranean mandolins. That same day, the singer held a promotion day at the Esplanade Zagreb Hotel, attended by her close collaborators, friends and family members. Additionally, she performed some of the album's songs joined by 20 musicians on stage; she announced that the performance was only a "warm-up" for the tour's opening show in Zagreb.

== Production ==
The visual aspect of the concert was supported by more than 400 m2 of LED screens, over 300 light bodies and more than 500 thousand Watts of sound. Lasers, fireworks and animation were present for all songs. Miloš Šarovoć served as the tour's main director. During a press release after her concert in Zadar on 9 March 2024, Rozga revealed that the tour was the most expensive show ever produced by a Croatian artist.

== Announcement and promotion ==
On 20 May 2022, Jelena Rozga appeared at narodni radio's Living Room acoustic where she performed a medley of her songs and gave a short interview during which she first announced an upcoming tour. She revealed that the tour would begin with a first concert at the Zagreb Arena in Zagreb, Croatia on 17 December 2022. Additionally, she also mentioned the release of a new single shortly prior to her performance at the Fusion World Music Festival on 19 July 2022. During a later interview, Rozga revealed that the second concert of the tour held at the Spaladium Arena in her hometown Split, held twelve years after her first sold-out concert at the same venue, will be "a spectacle" which will feature "the best team, the best lighting show, the best sound system, with a genial stage, dancers and instrumentalists".

A concert in Belgrade, Serbia was announced in September and is scheduled to take place on 7 April 2023. In an interview on 3 November 2022, Rozga revealed that the show marks the biggest "production show" in her career. She also revealed that the choreography was arranged by Žiga Sotlar. Additionally, Rozga implemented many of the ballet dance move she learnt during her childhood ballet classes. The tour was also announced to visit other major cities in other Balkan countries, such as Skopje in North Macedonia, Sarajevo in Bosnia and Herzegovina and Ljubljana in Slovenia.

Although it was initially titled the Rozga Tour, following the release of the album Minut Srca Mog, the tour was renamed to the Minut Srca Mog Tour. During a press conference after her concert in Novi Sad, Rozga revealed that she purposefully decided to give one concert per city, while she could also do several at a stop.

== Fashion ==
On the first concert of the tour, taking place at the second day of the Fusion Music Festival, Rozga appeared dressed in vamp style. She donned a cropped black abdomen-revealing top, lace top and wide black trousers. Her style was praised by the press and fashion critics who felt that it was a change in her usual attire and that she managed to use her clothes to emphasize her body. For the second performance of the show, the singer had three costume changes which she further adapted to the songs she performed. She wore designs by the fashion duo eNVy room; this included a red overall with a short leather skirt, black dress and a white sparkling costume. Her costumes were deemed to be "impressive" by a writer of Croatian T-portal.

== Synopsis ==
The concerts of the tour were divided into three different parts which were conceptually divided along with the singer's outfits. The concert's set list opened with a group of 20 dancers marching on stage to the beat of the song "Ne Tiče Me Se", after which Rozga appeared onstage singing the song. This was followed by the performance of "Nirvana" for which the singer performed a choreography together with her dancers. After a brief speech and a pause, the singer performed the song "Bižuterija", the turning point in her music career. In the subsequent part of the concert, the singer performed "'Ko Me Zove", "Opijum", "Suze Biserne", "S Druge Strane Mjeseca", "Ako Poludim", Jel' Zbog Nje", "Kad Bi Bio Blizu", "Dani Su Bez Broja" and "Ginem", all originally recorded during her time with the band Magazin. Another medley of the band's songs included "Ti Si Želja Mog Života" and "Ljube se Dobri, Loši, Zli", both of which were recorded when Ljiljana Nikolovska served as the band's lead singer.

Towards the second part of the concert, she mostly performed more recent songs from her solo career that included "Dobitna Kombinacija", "Okus Mentola", "Daj Šta Daš", "Moje Proljeće", "Razmažena", "Moderna Žena", "Solo Igračica", "Roba s Greškom" and "Cirkus". During the last part of the concert she was joined on stage by Matija Cvek for the performance of the acoustic version of "Zar je ljubav spala na to". The finishing part of the concert included "Samo se ljubit' isplati", "Minut' Srca Mog" and "Opijum", which was performed last during the concert's encore.

== Critical reception ==
The singer's performance at the Fusion Festival was dubbed "marvellous" by Ana Samardžić of RTL and as "raising the already high energy" by Matea Sušac of Gloria. The performance at the Zagreb Arena received stellar reviews; Ivana Lulić writing for the website Glazba.hr called it "a show on the scale of worldwide performers". She went on to call the concert "not only a concert, but a true experience" and praised the authenticity of the highly planned three-hour performance. She concluded her review with the remark: "Jelena Rozga had an impeccable show, a performance that was nothing less of a spectacle filled with vocal power and emotions... this concert was the defining moment that pays homage to her 27 year-long career and future that never looked brighter". Another writer of T-portal reviewing the same concert dubbed it "spectacular" and a confirmation the singer "belongs to the very tight circle of the biggest stars of the region". The writer further praised Miloš Šarović who served as the set-up of the scene. Anđela Parmać and Ante Peričić, reviewing the concert for Novi list, noted that the singer had "an unmistakable set-list choice, excellent scenery and unbelievable energy" which "completely amazed" the audience.

Bojana Krkeljić from Nova praised all aspects of Rozga's Belgrade concert including the "demonstration of incredible vocal capabilities and energy to which many would be envious, perfect choreography, spotless scenography and the most state-of-the-art audio-visual effects." The concert held in Skopje on 10 February 2024, saw the singer crying and "fulfilling one of the biggest wishes of her life". Her concert received critical acclaim from the Macedonian press, including a writer of the journal Republika who praised her vocal and dancing skills and the changes in clothes during the concert. Rozga concluded the concert, saying: "The love and energy I felt tonight cannot be described in words. I am really grateful to all because I had maybe one of the most emotional concerts. Thank you Skopje, I had a great time". According to a journalist of the Macedonian newspaper CrnoBelo.com, Rozga's concert was "spectacular" and "in accordance with world standards" and her twelve back-up dancers performed the choreography as if they were one. According to journalists, the concert was also well-received by the singer's fanbase as the "atmosphere featured a 'music tsunami' and choir singing, lifted arms and smiling faces, but the fact that after three hours, no one wanted to leave home." The concert in Skopje was attended by the former prime minister of the country Dimitar Kovačevski.

== Commercial performance ==
In November 2022, it was announced that the singer's opening concert at the Zagreb Arena was sold out, almost a month before its date, and was attended by more than 20,000 people.

== Set list ==
The following set list is representative of the concert at the Zagreb Arena held on 17 December 2022.

1. "Ne Tiče Me Se"
2. "Nirvana"
3. "Daj Šta Daš"
4. "Ako Poludim"
5. "Bižuterija"
6. "Dobitna Kombinacija"
7. "Okus Mentola"
8. "Tsunami"
9. "Oprosti Mala"
10. "'Ko Me Zove"
11. "Opijum"
12. "S Druge Strane Mjeseca"
13. "Prorok"
14. "Ti Si Želja Mog Života"
15. "Nebo Boje Moje Ljubavi"
16. "Ljube Se Dobri, Loši, Zli"
17. "Suze Biserne"
18. "Je'l Zbog Nje"
19. "Kad Bi Bio Blizu"
20. "Da Li Znaš Da Te Ne Volim"
21. "Dani Su Bez Broja"
22. "Minus I Plus"
23. "Kraljica"
24. "Moderna Žena"
25. "Solo Igračica"
26. "Roba S Greškom"
27. "Cirkus"
28. "Moje Proljeće"
29. "Ne Pijem, Ne Pušim"
30. "Razmažena"
31. "Ginem"
32. "Zar je ljubav spala na to"
33. "Samo se ljubit' isplati"
34. "Minut Srca Tvog"
  Encore
35. "Opijum"

== Shows ==
List of tour concerts, showing date, city, country, venue, number of available tickets and amount of gross revenue
Date	City	Country	Venue
Europe
23 July 2022 (Note: The concert on July 23, was part of the Fusion World Music Festival.)	Split	Croatia	Stadion Park Mladeži
17 December 2022	Zagreb	Croatia	Arena Zagreb
28 January 2023	Novo Mesto	Slovenia	Dvorana Marof
18 February 2023	Frankfurt	Germany	Flinsch Club
7 April 2023	Belgrade	Serbia	Štark Arena
1 May 2023	Herceg Novi	Montenegro	Portonovi Marina Square
5 May 2023	Vienna	Austria	Trestor club
8 May 2023	Budva	Montenegro	Cascada club
27 July 2023	Budva	Montenegro	Top Hill
26 August 2023	Radomlje	Slovenia	Športni Park Radomlje
28 October 2023	Novi Sad	Serbia	Spens
16 December 2023	Podčetrtek	Slovenia	Sportska Dvorana
11 November 2023	Großwarasdorf	Austria	Kuga Großwarasdorf
10 February 2024	Skopje	North Macedonia	Boris Trajkovski Arena
8 March 2024	Zadar	Croatia	Višnjik
17 May 2024	Trebinje	Bosnia and Herzegovina	Dvorana Sl Olimp
15 June 2024	Žirovnica	Slovenia	NGEN dnevi
16 June 2024	Bjelovar	Croatia	Terezijana fest
5 July 2024	Mostar	Bosnia and Herzegovina	Stadium Kantarevac
7 July 2024	Šabac	Serbia	Sava Šabac
11 July 2024	Vodice	Croatia	City Square
17 July 2024	Kukljica	Croatia	City Square
19 July 2024	Koprivnica	Croatia	City Square
20 July 2024	Kostrena	Croatia	Uvala Žurkovo
27 July 2024	Ližnjan	Croatia	Uvala Kuje
3 August 2024	Blato	Croatia	Plokata
10 August 2024	Primošten	Croatia	Aurora Club
17 August 2024	Nova Gradiška	Croatia	City Square
2 November 2024	Sarajevo	Bosnia and Herzegovina	Zetra Hall

=== Box office score data ===
Venue	City	Tickets Sold
Stadion Park Mladeži	Split	15,000
Arena Zagreb	Zagreb	20,000
Dvorana Marof	Novo Mesto	1,200
Top Hill	Budva	5,500
Športni Park Radomlje	Radomlje	3,100

== Cancelled shows ==
List of cancelled concerts, showing date, city, country, venue and reason for cancellation
Date	City	Country	Venue	Reason
11 February 2023	Split	Croatia	Spaladium Arena	Closing of arena
