= Moderna Žena (song) =

Single by Jelena Rozga

from the album Moderna Žena
- Released: 16 December 2016
- Recorded: 2016
- Genre: Pop
- Length: 4:07
- Label: Croatia Records
- Songwriter: Vjekoslava Huljić
- Producer: Tonči Huljić

Jelena Rozga singles chronology
"Pismo-Glava" (2016)	"Moderna Žena" (2016)	"Žileti" (2017)

Music video
- "Moderna Žena" on YouTube

"Moderna Žena" is a song by Croatian pop singer Jelena Rozga from her eponymous third studio album (2016). It was released as the album's second single on 16 December 2016. The song was written by Vjekoslava Huljić and produced by Tonči Huljić. The inspiration behind the song was a real-life case of a woman's experience with a lover which Tonči Huljić read in a magazine and recounted it to his wife. Lyrically, "Moderna Žena" was described as a female anthem and was dedicated to strong women living in the modern world.

The single was commercially successful peaking at number 20 on the Croatian HR Top 40 singles chart. An accompanying music video directed by Dario Radusin was released on 16 December 2016. The video shows Rozga, posing and walking in dresses designed by Juraj Zigman, accompanied by a male actor. As of December 2022, the video has more than 18.6 million views on the platform. Rozga performed "Moderna Žena" live during her live concerts and gigs.

== Background and lyrics ==
On 16 December 2016, Jelena Rozga's third studio album Moderna Žena was made available for digital download and in physical form through Croatia Records. Most songs on the album, including the title song were produced by Tonči Huljić and written by Vjekoslava Huljić.

"Moderna Žena" was described by the singer as a female anthem. Describing her intention and ideas behind the song and the concept of a "modern woman", she said: "I wanted something strong, and that's exactly what this phrase gave me. A modern woman walks in the world with her heart and mind, both of which are necessary in life. The heart to know who we are and the mind to remain who we are. The time we live in is different, the role of women in the modern world has changed, they are more determined, brave, independent, I would say that the real era of modern women is yet to come. A woman today has to be successful in business, a perfect mother, passionate in love, loyal to her friends... and we can do it, sometimes it's hard for us, sometimes no one understands us, but us women can do anything we want, we just have to stick together." Lyrically, it was inspired by a real-life story of a woman who left her husband for a younger man, who afterwards left her for a younger woman. In the song, the female protagonist is expressing her doubts related to her previous and next relationship. The inspiration for the song came after Huljić read a reader's confession in a female magazine and retold it to his wife.

In January 2017, the lyrics of the song were criticized by political analyst Ivana Marić from Bosnia and Herzegovina through a post on her Facebook profile. She felt that the concept of a "modern woman" discussed in the song was inaccurate and not a good example for young girls aspiring to the singer to listen to.

== Music video ==
An accompanying music video for the song was released on 16 December 2016, on the same day as its premiere. As with the other singles from the album, Dario Radusin served as the video's director. The video opens with artistic shots of Rozga walking and posing, also seen as a mirror image. She is accompanied by another model, who acts as her love interest in the video. Some shots are shown in black-and-white and some are filmed in color.

The clip was described as "very interesting" by a writer of the Slovenian website 24ur.com. The singer's look in the video was praised as "powerful and strong" owing to the costumes she wears designed by Juraj Zigman. On 30 November 2016, a behind-the-scenes video along with an interview with the singer was released. As of December 2022, the video has been watched more than 18.6 million times on the platform.

== Chart performance ==
Following its release as a single, "Moderna Žena" peaked at number 20 on the HR Top 40 singles chart for the week ending 29 December 2016. The following week, the single fell to number 37 in the second week of 2017.

== Live performances ==
During the promotion of the album Moderna Žena, Rozga performed the song during various concerts and gigs held in its promotion. On 3 May 2022, Rozga performed an acoustic version of the song, along with Milan Terze on guitar, during one of her live Instagram home concerts held in the midst of the COVID-19 pandemic. The song was included on the set list of the singer's regional Minut Srca Mog Tour (2022-23), where it was performed in the middle of the concert.

== Credits and personnel ==
Information related to the credits and personnel of "Moderna Žena" is taken from the official music video on YouTube.

Song credits

- Jelena Rozga – vocals
- Vjekoslava Huljić – songwriting
- Tonči Huljić – music, arrangement

Video credits

- Dario Radusin – director
- Saša Joković – make-up
- Salon Franić – hairstyle
- Mate Rončević – styling
