= Ne Pijem, Ne Pušim =

Single by Jelena Rozga

from the album Moderna Žena
- Released: 11 April 2017
- Recorded: 2016
- Genre: Pop
- Length: 3:37
- Label: Croatia Records
- Songwriter: Vjekoslava Huljić
- Producers: Tonči Huljić; Dušan Vasić

Jelena Rozga singles chronology
"Žileti" (2017)	"Ne Pijem, Ne Pušim" (2017)	"Najbolji Dan" (2018)

Music video
- "Ne Pijem, Ne Pušim" on YouTube

"'Ne Pijem, Ne Pušim" (English: I Don't Drink, I Don't Smoke) is a song by Croatian pop singer Jelena Rozga from her third studio album Moderna Žena (2016). It was written by Croatian lyricist and songwriter Vjekoslava Huljić and produced by Tonči Huljić and Dušan Vasić. It was released as the album's fourth single through Croatia Records on 11 April 2017. Commercially, the song achieved success in Croatia, peaking at number ten on the HR Top 40 singles chart. Musically, "Ne Pijem, Ne Pušim" is an uptempo, joyous love song that was compared to songs from Rozga's work during her time in the group Magazin and to Huljić's own work with the band Madre Badessa. Lyrically, the song describes how the protagonist does not drink, smoke nor curse and that her only sin is love.

A music video for the song was directed by Dario Radusin was released on the singer's Facebook page the same day as the song itself. Paying homage to Robert Palmer's "Addicted to Love" (1986), the clip is performance-based and it shows Rozga lip-syncing the lyrics to the song accompanied by an all-female band. The music video is watched more than 18.5 million times as of 2022. "Ne Pijem, Ne Pušim" was further promoted by several televised performances by the singer, including those on narodni radio and the 2020 Golden Ladybug of Popularity. Furthermore, the song is part of the set list of Rozga's concerts and gigs.

== Background and composition ==
"Ne Pijem, Ne Pušim" was written by Croatian lyricist and songwriter Vjekoslava Huljić and produced by musician and arranger Tonči Huljić. Dušan Vasić also collaborated on the production. The song was included on Jelena Rozga's third studio album Moderna Žena (2016). It was released as the fourth single from the album through Croatia Records on 11 April 2017. During its release, Rozga briefly spoke of the song, calling it "one of those songs which colour gray into the most beautiful colours, it has an infectious, positive melody and lyrics and I am sure that you will have it on repeat like me". Rozga revealed that when she first heard the song, it reminded her of Magazin's "Opijum" and thus, its working title was "Opijum 2". As the song was not ready before the release of the album, Tonči Huljić suggested to Rozga to omit it from the track list. Nevertheless, upon the insisting of Rozga, the lyrics for the song were finished in two days and mailed to her after which she immediately went to the studio and recorded it in half an hour.

Musically, "Ne Pijem, Ne Pušim" was compared to the works of Huljić's ethno and folk band Madre Badessa. It is a joyous and an up-tempo song which describes that despite the protagonist not drinking, not smoking and not cursing, she still falls pray to one sin which is love. Upon its release, the song was also compared to the singer's work during the time when she served as the lead singer of the band Magazin. A writer of Croatian Music Channel felt that "Ne Pijem, Ne Pušim" is "one of those songs which, with their positive energy and easy melody enters the ears of listeners very fast and it does not stylistically stick out from other songs which are found on... 'Moderna žena'."

== Music video ==
A music video for the song was released simultaneously with the single release on 11 April 2017. It was directed by Dario Radusin and intended as a tribute to Robert Palmer's "Addicted to Love" (1986). "The music video is dedicated to one of my dearest clips by Robert Palmer, which left a big mark in my childhood. There is something magical, attractive in that video and I wanted to unite the emotion with the positive energy of the song". It features Rozga dressed in black pants and a white revealing shirt singing the song on stage accompanied by an all-female band. The music video became widely popular and is watched almost 18 million times as of May 2022. Writing for Serbian Telegraf, a journalist described the singer as "radiating with sex appeal". At the end of 2017, the music video for the song was ranked as the seventh most-watched video of the year in Croatia.

== Live performances ==
Rozga first performed the song live following its release during an Easter concert at Revelin in Dubrovnik on 16 April 2017. As part of the song's promotion, Rozga performed "Ne Pijem, Ne Pušim" during several televised appearances. On 10 August 2018, the singer released a video snippet on Instagram where she was singing the song together with Petar Grašo on piano and accompanied by several friends. On 31 January 2018, Rozga appeared on narodni radio's Dan Najbolje Domaće Glazbe 2018 where she performed the song. On 21 May 2022, she performed an acoustic cover at the narodni's program Living Room Acoustic. In February 2020, Rozga appeared on the Macedonian Golden Ladybug of Popularity awards show, held at the A1 Arena in Skopje where she performed a medley of "Cirkus", "Ne Pijem, Ne Pušim" and "Dani Su Bez Broja". For the performance, she appeared donning a blue dress for which she received praise. In addition to the televised appearances, "Ne Pijem, Ne Pušim" is part of the singer's set list during her concerts in Croatia and the wider post-Yugoslav region. Additionally, she performed it on 25 December 2020, on Christmas, during an online live concert on Instagram during the COVID-19 pandemic accompanied by Milan Terze and Karlo Dotur on guitar.

A polka cover of the song together with Nina Badrić's "Dani i godine" and Mladen Grdović's "Dalmatinac Sam" was performed by the Slovenian trio Polkaholiki and released on YouTube on 10 December 2019.

== Credits and personnel ==
Information related to the credits and personnel of "Ne pijem, ne pušim" is taken from the official music video on YouTube.

Song credits

- Music: Tonči Huljić
- Lyrics: Vjekoslava Huljić
- Arrangement: Tonči Huljić, Dušan Vasić

Video credits

- Directed by: Dario Radusin
- Make-up: Saša Joković
- Hair: Salon Franić

== Charts ==
"Ne Pijem, Ne Pušim" debuted and peaked at number 10 on the Croatian HR Top 40 singles chart for the week ending 17 April 2017.

Chart performance for "Ne Pijem, Ne Pušim"
Chart (2017)	Peak position
Croatia (HR Top 40)	10
