= Moje Proljeće =

Single by Jelena Rozga
- Released: 29 January 2019
- Recorded: 2019
- Genre: Pop
- Length: 3:55
- Label: Croatia Records
- Songwriter: Emina Jahović
- Producer: Darko Dimitrov

Jelena Rozga singles chronology
"Ostani" (2019)	"Moje Proljeće" (2019)	"Sveto Pismo" (2020)

Music video
- "Moje Proljeće" on YouTube

"'Moje Proljeće" (English: My Spring) is a song by Croatian pop singer Jelena Rozga. It was written by Serbian-Turkish singer-songwriter Emina Jahović and produced by Darko Dimitrov. It was released as a single through Croatia Records on 29 January 2019 along with an accompanying music video directed by Dario Radusin. The song was well received by music critics who praised Rozga for the switch in musical style and the balladry. Commercially, the song achieved success in Croatia and the wider Yugoslav region, peaking at number three on the HR Top 40.

An accompanying music video for the song was directed by Dario Radusin and released on 29 January 2019. It showed the singer's emotional rendition of the lyrics, in some scenes also seen crying. She is dressed in white and appears running and wandering in a snowy forest. The clip is watched more than 20 million times as of 2025. The song was included on the set list of the singer's live performances and gigs given throughout the Balkan region. In 2022 and 2023, it was added to the set list of the regional Minut Srca Mog Tour.

== Background ==
The song marks the second collaboration with Bosnian singer-songwriter Emina Jahović, whom Rozga had collaborated with earlier in 2019 on a song titled "Ostani". The song was originally sent to Montenegrin singer Sergej Ćetković and intended as a duet; although he stored it for approximately six years, he could not record it as it did not resonate with him. During a period of Rozga's life, Ćetković felt that the song described her experience very well and sent her to him. Despite wide media speculation that the song was dedicated to Rozga's then-boyfriend and fiancée, Rozga revealed during an interview that it was dedicated to another man. Additionally, she also said that "Every woman has a lover who she never manages to get through[...] The song describes the experience of an unfortunate love". She added that while maintaining her private life away from the eyes of the public, with the song, she only wanted to convey that she was also a "wounded woman". Backing vocals are provided by Antonia Gigovska.

== Music video ==
A music video for the song, directed by Dario Radusin was released on 29 January 2019. It portrays an emotional Rozga singing the song, in some scenes also seen crying, and later wandering in a snowy forest. Other scenes are also interspersed, where she is seen singing the lyrics while dressed in white and lying in an area filled with smoke. The music video became trending in six ex-Yugoslav countries (Serbia, Croatia, Bosnia and Herzegovina, North Macedonia, Montenegro and Slovenia) and amassed 2 million views on YouTube in a week. Briefly after its release, it received widespread praise from her fanbase. Rozga responded to the widespread praise of the clip by saying "I have no words to express what I feel, this is very emotional for me. I sang the song from my heart and the tears that fell like a knife, divided me into two parts. One part of me sang out of pain and pure emotion while another is broken from love. That is how this song acted on me, on people from all ages and gender. I am grateful to evevryone who loves "Moje proljeće" and experiences it in a way that I never could even dream they could share with me". On 13 December 2020, the singer released a one-take of the video on her official YouTube channel with the intention of sharing the emotions the song elicited in her.

== Live performances ==
Rozga performed the song on 29 January at the 2019 Music Awards Ceremony (MAC) show in Belgrade. On 6 March 2019, she performed an acoustic version of the song on narodni radio accompanied by her band. She later appeared on the radio again for a longer concert on 5 February 2020, where she again performed the song live.

On 19 April 2020, during the second in a series of seven concerts she held at home due to the COVID-19 pandemic, Rozga performed an acoustic rendition of "Moje Proljeće" accompanied by musician Milan Terze on guitar. The video was initially streamed on Instagram Live and later on YouTube. The song was included on the set list of the singer's regional Minut Srca Mog Tour (2022-23), where it was performed in the middle of the concert.

As part of her televised appearance on the 11th episode of the Balkanskom ulicom show on 30 October 2020, Emina Jahović covered the song live.

== Credits and personnel ==
Credits for the song and the music video are taken from the description of the song on YouTube.

Song credits

- Music: Emina Jahović
- Lyrics: Emina Jahović
- Arrangement: Darko Dimitrov
- Back vocal: Antonija Gigovska

Video credits

- Directed by: Dario Radusin
- Photography: Petar Vilović
- Make-up: Saša Joković
- Hair: Zvonimir Franić, salon Franić
- Clothes: eNVy room, Twins
- Jewelry: Lana and Love
- Styling: Mate Rončević

== Charts ==
Briefly after its release, for the week ending 11 February 2019, the song peaked at number three on the Croatian HR Top 40 singles chart.

Chart performance for "Moje Proljeće"
Chart (2020)	Peak position
Croatia (HR Top 40)	3
