= Moderna Žena =

Studio album by Jelena Rozga
- Released: 16 December 2016
- Recorded: 2011 – 2016
- Studios: Croatia Records; Karpo Studio (Zagreb); TM Studio (Split); Studios Duke, Empire Studio, Muzički Studio Crveni Ruž (Belgrade)
- Genres: Pop; folk; EDM; rap
- Length: 1:28:04
- Labels: Croatia Records; Tonika
- Producers: Tonči Huljić; Boris Đurđević; Leo Škaro; Dušan Vasić; Aleksandar Krsmanović; Bojan Dragojević; Fedor Boić; Boris Krstajić; Dragan Tašković

Jelena Rozga studio albums chronology
Best of Jelena Rozga (2011)	Moderna Žena (2016)	Jelena Rozga (2017)

Singles from Moderna Žena
- 1. "Nirvana" Released: 26 March 2013; 2. "Kraljica" Released: 21 June 2015; 3. "Pismo-Glava" Released: 2 December 2016; 4. "Moderna Žena" Released: 16 December 2016; 5. "Žileti" Released: 16 March 2017; 6. "Ne Pijem, Ne Pušim" Released: 11 April 2017

Moderna Žena (English: Modern Woman) is the third studio album by Croatian pop singer Jelena Rozga. It was released on 16 December 2016 through Croatia Records. Moderna Žena is a dual-disc album with the first disc containing newer songs, while the second disc consists of songs that Rozga released in the period between 2011 and 2014. As with Rozga's previous two studio albums, the duo Tonči Huljić and Vjekoslava Huljić served as the main producer and songwriter, respectively. In addition to producers collaborators Remi Kazinoti and Pero Kozomara whom the singer collaborated with on previous songs, Moderna Žena also saw the work of new collaborators Boris Đurđević, Leo Škaro and Dušan Bačić among others.

Work on the album Moderna Žena began in 2013, briefly after the conclusion of the singer's The Bižuterija Tour (2011–12) in promotion of her second studio album. Unlike her previous records, Moderna Žena is musically diverse and incorporates several musical elements, ranging from traditional Dalmatian and Balkan folk music to electronic dance music (EDM), modern pop and rap. Lyrically, the songs on the album are marked by feminist undertones with most songs discussing a female protagonist's experiences with love. Critically, the album was well received by the public and music critics who praised the sonic diversity.

Moderna Žena achieved significant commercial success, peaking at number one on the Croatian Albums Chart immediately after its release. It subsequently spent a total of 17 weeks at that position, receiving a gold certification by the Croatian Phonographic Association, three months after its release, becoming the singer's third solo studio album to achieve such a feat. As part of the album's promotion, Rozga held a listening party on 26 January 2017 and embarked on a small regional tour. Additionally, four singles were released from the album, including lead single "Pismo-Glava" and the title song in 2016 and "Žileti" and "Ne Pijem, Ne Pušim" in 2017. The album received a nomination for Best Pop Album at the 2017 Porin Awards. It emerged as the best-selling album in Croatia at the end of 2017 and was listed as one of the most-streamed albums on Deezer in 2018.

== Background and conception ==
I wanted something strong, and that's exactly what this phrase gave me. A modern woman walks in the world with her heart and mind, both of which are necessary in life. The heart to know who we are and the mind to remain who we are. The time we live in is different, the role of women in the modern world has changed, they are more determined, brave, independent, I would say that the real era of modern women is yet to come. A woman today has to be successful in business, a perfect mother, passionate in love, loyal to her friends... and we can do it, sometimes it's hard for us, sometimes no one understands us, but us women can do anything we want, we just have to stick together.

— Rozga, interview with newspaper

In the summer of 2011, Rozga released her second studio album Bižuterija. The album was a huge commercial success, receiving the gold certification within a month of its release, having sold more than 15.000 copies. In support of the album, Rozga launched The Bižuterija Tour, which visited numerous cities across the Balkans, starting in September 2010 in Zadar and finishing in December 2012 in Sarajevo.

Shortly after the tour, Rozga revealed during interviews that she was working on new studio albums. In the first interview with the Croatian Music Channel, in March 2013, during a behind-the-scenes recording of the music video for one of her singles, "Nirvana", she announced she would soon begin working on a new album. At that time, she revealed a tentative date for its release at the end of 2013 or the beginning of 2014, but also noted she would take time to ensure the quality of the album. In March 2014, in an interview with In Magazin of Nova TV, Rozga confirmed the working title of the album Afrodizijak and during an interview for Hello magazin, she gave an estimated release date around June of the same year, while also revealing that she had already made a selection for the track listing. On 10 October 2015, during an interview with Hello magazine, she announced her third studio album for March 2016. Finally, during the promotion of the single "Udajem Se" on Radio Dalmacija in February 2016, she revealed September as the release date. In November 2016, during a photoshoot with the Croatian edition of Cosmopolitan, she revealed that the recording for the album would soon be finished and that it should be available in December.

When asked why she chose to give the album "modern woman" as a title, Rozga further elaborated on the feminist concept behind its creation and how it was a "strong, sonic, memorable" one. She also gave her definition of a modern woman as one who is self-aware, knows no obstacles, is a fighter, gives all her energy to get to her goal, is not afraid to enter something new, who is strong and "lifts her head up in the hardest times and goes on". Rozga also revealed that Moderna Žena was meant as a gift to her listeners as she had not released an album since 2011. A more specific target audience were females whom the album was encouraging to become brave, reclaim what is theirs, show self-respect and request respect from others.

== Release and production ==
Moderna Žena was exclusively available online on the music streaming service Deezer starting 7 December 2016. The following week, it was made available for digital download and in physical form on 16 December 2016 through Croatia Records. As with Rozga's previous two studio albums, Oprosti Mala (2006) and Bižuterija (2011), Tonči Huljić and Vjekoslava Huljić served as the main musician/arranger and songwriter for all songs, respectively. Additionally, on Moderna Žena, Rozga collaborated with producers Pero Kozomara and Robert Pilepić whom she had worked with before, as well as new songwriters such as Saša Lazić, Dušan Bačić and Ivica Brnas.

Moderna Žena is a dual-disc album which contains 11 songs on the first CD and 12 songs on the second one, which is also a bonus CD. The first dosc of the album contained five songs which were published prior to the release of the album ("Tsunami", "Kraljica", "Otrov", "Udajem Se" and "Nasljednik") and six newly released songs. The second disc of the album, which is available as a bonus CD, contains 12 songs which were released as standalone singles in the period between 2011 and 2014, some of which also found their way on Rozga's first compilation album Best of Jelena Rozga (2011). The second disc of the album includes songs with two featuring artists, Croatian rap band Connect on the song "Dalmatinka" and Dalmatian traditional music band Klapa Rišpet on the song "Prsti Zapleteni".

On the production of songs on Moderna Žena, in addition to Remi Kazinoti, other collaborators include Boris Đurđević, from the Croatian band Colonia, Leo Škaro, Dušan Vasić, Aleksandar Krsmanović, Bojan Dragojević, Fedor Boić, Boris Krstajić and Dragan Tašković. The album was recorded in several studios, including Croatia Records Studio and Karpo Studio in Zagreb, Studio TM in Split and Studio Duke, Empire Studio and Muzički Studio Crveni Ruž in Belgrade. As part of the release package, the album also included a booklet with the lyrics to all songs. The album's cover art was taken by photographer John Pavlish.

== Music and lyrics ==
The sound on Moderna Žena was described as a combination of the singer's sound during the era when she served as the lead singer of Magazin and a sound influenced by modern arrangements. Musically, the album is a folk, electronic dance music (EDM), Dalmatian music and a pop music record. "Pismo-Glava, the album's opening track was described as a classical pop ballad. Lyrically, it professes the female protagonist's love feelings towards her male counterpart, who is doubtful towards her. To determine the future of their relationship, she decides to toss a coin. The title song, being placed second on the album, was described as a female anthem. Lyrically, it was inspired by a real-life story of a woman who left her husband for a younger man, who afterwards left her for a younger woman. In the song, the female protagonist is expressing her doubts about the age of her next lover. The inspiration for the song came after Huljić read a reader's confession in a female magazine and retold it to his wife. The next song, "Ne Pijem, Ne Pušim" is an up-tempo, joyous song, which is musically similar to the work by ethno and folk band Tonči Huljić & Madre Badessa and the singer's own work from her time in the band Magazin. Lyrically, it finds the female protagonist confessing that despite not smoking, drinking nor cursing, she still falls prey to the sin of love. This is followed by "Svjetla Neona" which the singer described as a "party song" which lyrically discusses the type of a man the female protagonist needs.

In Rozga's own words, the fifth track, "Žileti" is a song which discusses the "games of destiny" and depicts a love story without a happy ending. The sixth track, the heatfelt and emotional ballad "Rođena Sam" is influenced by Dalmatian music and displays Rozga's vocal capabilities. The singer dedicated it to "all who are in love, all of us who believe in love, the first kiss, the first dance, the memories, the ones in the past and the ones to come". The seventh track on the album "Nasljednik", is an up-tempo, uplifting fast-paced song, which features a pop melody. It was lyrically dedicated to "alpha" women, who feel confident in their own skin and want to "reclaim what is theirs". The following track, "Udajem Se" is a soft pop ballad.

The last three tracks on the album, "Tsunami", "Otrov" and "Kraljica" all predominantly contain elements of folk music. "Tsunami" is an up-tempo female anthem that lyrically discusses females not letting their partner cheat. In the singer's own words, it is meant "to be danced to, sometimes to even [make listeners] get on the table [to dance]". "Otrov", marked the singer's second collaboration with Dušan Bačić after "Tsunami" which led to a similar sound. Its message was directed to female listeners to urge them to remain themselves and not to forgive adultery. The singer dedicated "Kraljica" to women who she encouraged to "live every day like queens". Musically, it is an optimistic song which describes the shared experience of females with certain type of flirtatious men.

The bonus disc, which features songs that had been already released contains "Cirkus", a classical pop ballad and "Nirvana" and "Okus Mentola", both EDM-influenced. "Dalmatinka" is predominantly a Dalmatian pop track while also featuring rap elements and lyrics. "Prsti Zapleteni" featuring Klapa Rišpet features elements of Dalmatian music.

== Promotion ==
Three days following the release of Moderna Žena, on 19 December 2016, Rozga appeared at two locations in Zagreb, Music Shop and Cafe Bar Nova Ploča to sign the album to listeners who purchased it. The event was attended by numerous fans at both locations. A listening promotion party of Moderna Žena was held at the Johan Franck Club in Zagreb on 26 January 2017. The event was attended by several of the singer's collaborators, including the Huljić duo and their daughter, Hana Huljić, football player Miroslav Ćiro Blažević, actress Katarina Baban, singer Joško Čagalj Jole, the singer's then-boyfriend Stjepan Hauser and former and current Magazin singers Danijela Martinović and Andrea Šušnjara, respectively. At the event, the singer performed songs from her older albums and several songs from Moderna Žena; she was also joined onstage by both Martinović and Šušnjara for the performance of several songs. For the event, she appeared dressed in a red creation by Croatian designer label Arileo and later in a black dress by H&M with high heels by Gucci. Her looks were praised by a writer of Dnevno.hr. The event was praised by a writer of Jutarnji list who called it "brilliant".

=== Singles released before the album ===
"Tsunami" was released as a standalone single on 9 December 2014. The music video directed by Radusin shows Rozga posing on a bed and in several scenes, she is accompanied by a male actor who portrays her love interest. Following its release as a single, "Tsunami" peaked at number 6 on the HR Top 40 for the week ending 16 January 2015, in its sixth week on the chart. "Kraljica" was released as a standalone single on 21 June 2015 along with a music video by Radusin. The same evening, Rozga gave an exclusive performance of the song at the grand finale of the Balkan production of the talent show The X Factor Adria. The single performed well in Croatia, peaking at number 25 on HR Top 40 for the week ending 10 July 2015.

"Otrov" was released on 27 November 2015 along with a music video directed by Radusin. Upon its release, the song was well received by the singer's audience. In the week ending 27 November, its first week as a single, "Otrov" debuted at number 17 on the HR Top 40 which later also became its peak position. "Udajem Se" was released on 19 February 2016, along with a black-and-white music video, directed by Muris Beglerović, portraying Rozga in a wedding dress in the closing scenes. The song peaked at number 2 on the HR Top 40, in its second week of charting, for the week ending 26 February 2016. "Nasljednik" was released on 15 July 2016 intended as a summer song. A music video in a hot summer setting, showing the singer dressed in a swimming costume, surrounded by male models was directed by Radusin and was released on Facebook the same day. The single peaked at number 13 on the chart for the week ending 25 August 2016 in its seventh week of charting.

=== Singles released after the album ===
At the end of November 2016, narodni radio announced the song "Pismo-Glava" as the lead single of the album. The song had a one-time airplay premiere on 2 December on Naxi Radio in Belgrade, Serbia. "Pismo-Glava" was released on 8 December along with a music video directed by Darko Drinovac. The single debuted at number 5 on the HR Top 40 chart in Croatia for the week ending 8 December 2016, which also became its peak position in the 11 weeks spent on the chart. On 16 December, coinciding with the release of the album, the title song "Moderna Žena" was released as the second single along with an accompanying music video by director Radusin. Briefly after its release, the single peaked at number 20 on the HR Top 40 singles chart for the week ending 29 December 2016.

"Žileti" was released as the third single on 16 March 2017 along with an accompanying music video directed by Radusin. "Žileti" debuted on the singles chart in Croatia at number 39 for the week ending 20 March 2017. It later peaked at number 35 in the second week of its release before falling off the top 40 in the next week. The lyrics of the single received some criticism from her fans, who felt that they were illogical. "Ne Pijem, Ne Pušim" was released as the fourth and final single of the album on 11 April 2017. The video directed by Radusin was inspired by Robert Palmer's "Addicted to Love (1986) and showed Rozga performing on stage accompanied by an all-female band. The single debuted at number 10 on the HR Top 40 for the week ending 17 April 2017. This position also became its peak on that chart. "Rođena Sam" and "Svjetla Neona" were released on YouTube as separate audio videos on 9 June and 11 July 2017, respectively, though neither was accompanied by a music video nor appeared on a singles chart.

=== Live performances ===
Rozga held various gigs, concerts and performances in Croatia and the wider region where she performed songs from Moderna Žena. One of her performances, were during an Easter concert at Revelin in Dubrovnik on 16 April 2017. In the summer of 2017, Rozga embarked on a regional summer tour in North Macedonia visiting Gevgelija on 7 July, Ohrid on 8 July, Kumanovo on 11 August and Strumica on 12 August. Several of the album's songs were also performed during live televised appearances by the singer. On 31 January 2018, Rozga appeared on narodni radio's Dan Najbolje Domaće Glazbe 2018 where she performed "Ne Pijem, Ne Pušim". Rozga first performed "Pismo-Glava" during a televised appearance at the 18. Večernjakov pečat festival held in Mostar, Bosnia and Herzegovina on 18 May 2018.

== Reception ==
Moderna Žena received mostly positive reviews from music critics. A writer of Story.hr felt that while her previous two releases were mostly sonically cohesive, Moderna Žena was stylistically "eclectic" which he attributed to the varietonew collaborators. Upon its release, several writers of the Balkan press viewed the album as Rozga's "best work to date". A writer from the Croatian Music Channel felt that the album represented Rozga as a "strong, but also an emotional, soft woman who does not accept cheating and compromise". A writer of Radio Dalmacija, felt that the album "satisfied all expectations by the singer's audience".

According to a writer of Radio Dalmacija, "only three days after the release of this album there was a demand that had not been felt [in the country] for a discographic release for a very long time". In the first week of its release, Moderna Žena debuted atop the Croatian Albums Chart. It remained at the top of the chart for 11 consecutive weeks; afterwards, it moved down several positions. In total, the album spent 17 weeks at the top position after its release. Only 3 months after its release, the album received a gold certification by the Croatian Phonographic Association, which indicated over 1,000 copies sold. On 12 December 2017, the Croatian Phonographic Association announced that Moderna Žena was the best-selling album of 2017. In the first ten months of the year, the album sold 2,550 pure sale copies. By November 2017, the album sold over 5,000 copies in the country in total.

Moderna Žena was nominated in the category for Best Pop Album at the 2017 Porin Awards held on 17 March 2017. Additionally, Rozga had received two other nominations at the 2014 Porin Awards, in the categories Hit of the Year for the songs "Dalmatinka" and "Nirvana", which are included on the album's bonus disc. In 2018, Moderna Žena was included on the list of the most-streamed albums in Croatia on the online music streaming service Deezer.

== Track listing ==
Disc 1
No.	Title	Writer(s)	Producer(s)	Length
1.	"Pismo-Glava"	Tonči Huljić; Vjekoslava Huljić	Huljić; Dušan Vasić; Leo Škaro	4:01
2.	"Moderna Žena"	Huljić; Huljić	Huljić; Vasić; Škaro	4:08
3.	"Ne Pijem, Ne Pušim"	Huljić; Huljić	Huljić; Vasić	3:38
4.	"Svjetla Neona"	Huljić; Huljić	Huljić; Vasić	3:18
5.	"Žileti"	Saša Lazić	Aleksandar Krsmanović	3:14
6.	"Rođena Sam"	Pero Kozomara; Robert Pilepić	Škaro	4:22
7.	"Nasljednik"	Huljić; Huljić	Huljić; Škaro	3:47
8.	"Udajem Se"	Kozomara; Pilepić	Škaro	4:31
9.	"Otrov"	Dušan Bačić	Bojan Dragojević	3:08
10.	"Kraljica"	Huljić; Huljić	Huljić; Škaro	3:49
11.	"Tsunami"	Bačić	Dragojević	3:10

Disc 2 —Bonus disc
No.	Title	Writer(s)	Producer(s)	Length
1.	"Razmažena"	Huljić; Huljić	Remi Kazinoti	3:45
2.	"Dalmatinka" (featuring Connect)	Zdeslav Klarić; Vlado Mirčeta; Slobodan Veljković; Bojan Šalamon; Juraj Blažević; Ivan Dražić; Samir Mujagić	Klarić; Šalamon	4:20
3.	"Zanemari"	Huljić; Huljić	Kazinoti	4:08
4.	"Solo Igračica"	Huljić; Huljić	Kazinoti	3:46
5.	"Dobitna Kombinacija"	Huljić; Huljić	Boris Đurđević	3:51
6.	"Nirvana"	Huljić; Huljić	Đurđević	3:46
7.	"Obožavam"	Huljić; Huljić	Đurđević	3:56
8.	"Cirkus"	Huljić; Huljić	Fedor Boić	3:43
9.	"Prsti Zapleteni" (featuring Klapa Rišpet)	Kozomara; Ivica Brnas	Kazinoti	3:52
10.	"Okus Mentola"	Huljić; Huljić	Đurđević	4:06
11.	"Život Je Čudo"	Huljić; Huljić	Boris Krstajić; Dragan Tašković	3:56
12.	"Odo' Ja"	Huljić; Huljić	Boić	3:49
Total length:				1:28:04

== Credits and personnel ==
Credits are taken from the album's liner notes and Discogs.

- Jelena Rozga – vocals (all tracks)
- Boris Đurđević – arrangement (tracks: 2–5 to 2–7, 2–10)
- Dušan Vasić – arrangement (tracks: 1–1 to 1–4)
- Leo Škaro – arrangement (tracks: 1-1, 1–2, 1–6 to 1–8, 1–10)
- Remi Kazinoti – arrangement (tracks: 2–1, 2–3, 2–4, 2–9)
- Tonči Huljić – arrangement (tracks: 1–1 to 1–4, 1–7, 1–10), music (tracks: 1–1 to 1–4, 1–7, 1–10, 2–1, 2–3 to 2–8, 2–10 to 2–12), producing (all tracks)
- Aleksandar Krsmanović – arrangement (track: 1–5)
- Bojan Dragojević – arrangement (track: 1–9)
- Fedor Boić – arrangement (track: 2–8)
- Boris Krstajić – arrangement (track: 2–11)
- Dragan Tašković – arrangement (track: 2–11)
- Robert Butković – design
- Vjekoslava Huljić – lyrics (tracks: 1–1 to 1–4, 1–7, 1–10, 2–1, 2–3 to 2–8, 2–10 to 2–12)
- John Pavlish – cover art

== Charts ==
=== Weekly charts ===
Chart performance for Moderna Žena
Chart (2016)	Peak position
Croatian Albums (HDU)	1

=== Year-end charts ===
Year-end chart performance for Moderna Žena
Chart (2016)	Position
Croatian Albums (HDU)	1

== Certifications and sales ==
Certifications of Moderna Žena
Region	Certification	Certified units/sales
Croatia (HDU)	Gold	5,000

== Release history ==
Release dates and formats for Moderna Žena
Region	Date	Format(s)	Label	Ref.
Various	16 December 2016	CD; digital download; streaming	Croatia, Tonika Records	

== See also ==
- List of 2016 albums
