= Nirvana (Jelena Rozga song) =

2013 single by Jelena Rozga

Single by Jelena Rozga

from the album Moderna žena
- Released: 26 March 2013
- Genre: EDM
- Length: 3:45
- Label: Croatia Records
- Songwriter: Vjekoslava Huljić
- Producers: Tonči Huljić; Boris Đurđević

Jelena Rozga singles chronology
"Dobitna kombinacija" (2012)	"Nirvana" (2013)	"Obožavam" (2013)

Music video
- "Nirvana" (Official Video 2013) on YouTube

"Nirvana" is a song by Croatian singer Jelena Rozga from her third studio album Moderna Žena (2016). It was first released as a single on 26 March 2013. The electronic dance music (EDM) song was written by Vjekoslava Huljić and produced by Tonči Huljić and Boris Đurđević. It lyrically discusses a seducing love game in a heterosexual relationship, comparing the female's experience to a state of bliss. Upon its release, the song was noted for a marked change of Rozga in her exploration of sensuality. However, it received negative backlash from the singer's audience due to a part of its lyrics for which Tonči entered a feud.

An accompanying music video was directed by Dario Radusin and released on the same day as the song through the singer's YouTube channel. It features her performing a ballet-inspired choreography backed by two male dancers in front of blue and purple light and thunders. The music video has over 46 million views on the platform as of June 2026. To further promote the song, Rozga performed it at the 2014 Porin Awards, where it also received a nomination for Hit of the Year. It is also included on the set list of all her tours, including the most recent Minut Srca Mog Tour (2022–2024).

== Background ==
"Nirvana" was written by Vjekoslava Huljić while its production was finalized by Tonči Huljić in collaboration with Boris Đurđević. The song was released on 26 March 2013 along with an accompanying music video. Speaking about the song's conception, Rozga said: "The song Nirvana not only brings a new music sound but also reveals my other side, which I decided to reveal after a long time. 'Nirvana' has powerful female lyrics, it speaks about a woman who is waiting for her man and is ready to face her destiny. In life, one should fight for oneself and take what's one's because life is not waiting, it is now'". She further added in an interview with Jutarnji list how "Nirvana" was a moment for her to see how much her sensuality would transform.

To promote the song, Rozga gave an interview to magazine Café 24 on 4 April 2013. She also appeared on Narodni radio together with host Dalibor Petko to promote the song and its music video on 10 April 2013. In 2016, the song was listed on the second disk of Jelena Rozga's third studio album Moderna Žena. Musically, "Nirvana" is an electronic dance music (EDM) track.

== Reception ==
A writer of Gloria magazine noted how the song marked a different version of Rozga, one that was not seen in her songs before. For the sixteenth week in 2013, the song peaked at number 16 on the Croatian Music Institute's HR Top 40 chart.

The lyric "come to me like a birthday celebrator to his cake" received criticism from the audience; Rozga responded by stating how it was meant to showcase her fragility in the eternal game of male and female romantic love. She shared her deep concern of becoming an object of hate speech by many people in the last years. At the time, Tonči Huljić was involved in a public feud with rapper Mirela Priselac Remi from the group Elemental who shared how she would take away Vjekoslava's freedom of speech. He went on to reply to her in an Index.hr interview, saying how it would be below his honor to answer back to her provocations and condemned her for the way she discussed her sexuality in her own songs. Rozga later revealed during an interview with Croatian Music Channel (CMC) Television how the pair decided on purpose to stir up a discussion among the public with the lyrics.

Vjekoslava was also subject to a threat for a lawsuit for anti-emancipation work. At the same time, conspiracy theories appeared how the song plagiarised Severina's "Brad Pitt" or Alex Mica's "Dalinda", which Rozga addressed saying it was not necessary to philosophise too much around the song. It was nominated for Hit of the Year at the 2014 Porin Awards.

== Music video ==
The music video for the song was shot by Dario Radusin. The dance was choreographed by Tamara Despot and Rozga's two dancers are Mihael and Damir. Her style is finalized by Ivana Karapanđa, her makeup by Simona Antonović, while her hair is stylized by Martin Posavec. It premiered, together with the song, on 26 March 2013. Prior to its release, Rozga shared two photos of herself on social media made during the filming of the video.

The video opens with Rozga posing in front of blue and purple light while being surrounded by her two male dancers. In the following scene, they proceed to lift her up while she is performing a ballet-like movement in their arms. She then descends on the ground and starts dancing; this is interspersed with scenes of thunder strikes in the sky shown behind her. The rest of the video interchanges between scenes of her singing the lyrics to the camera with different looks. As of June 2026, the music video for the song is the second most watched on Rozga's YouTube channel with over 46 million views.

In the video, Rozga can be seen in five different looks: wearing a ballet-like costume, wearing shorts and a tiger footprint shirt with a black glove on one hand, wearing a black dress, wearing a black top with black trousers, and wearing a silver top with pants. Upon the release of the song, Rozga said: "Except for the new song, I want to give my audience the entire package because the song, besides being listened to, needs to be experienced visually – with the movement, choreography, style. Sometimes, one should also risk". She also added how the video was meant to bring the energy of summer dances and a hot energy. A writer for Gloria magazine noticed how the version was an evolution and noted how it showed a "darker" and "purified" version of Rozga.

== Live performances ==
To further promote the song, Rozga performed it live during several televised appearances in 2013 and 2014, including Nedjeljom lagano '13, VIP Room '13, Sa So Mange '13 together with Goran Bregović, CMC Festival 2013 on 15 June, which also included an a cappella version, and I godina Nova '14.

On 28 June 2014, Rozga appeared in a costume designed by Juraj Zigman and performed the song at that year's Porin Awards at Kornata at Hypo Centar. Her performance involved a sensual chair choreography and a live rendition of the song. It was pointed out as one of the memorable performances of the night by CroModa and negative backlash from several fans on her Facebook page online due to its provocativity. On 14 February 2017, Rozga appeared on the Serbian Ami G show, where she performed a parody version of "Nirvana" during the segment "TekStonski poremećaj".

On 26 April 2020, during a live online concert that Rozga released on her Instagram and YouTube channel during the lockdowns related to the COVID pandemic, she performed an acoustic version of "Nirvana" accompanied by Milan Terze on guitar. From 2022 to 2024, the song was part of the set list of Rozga's regional Minut Srca Mog Tour which visited all post-Yugoslav countries.

== Credits and personnel ==
Credits for the song are taken from the official music video description on YouTube.

Song credits

- Music: Tonči Huljić
- Lyrics: Vjekoslava Huljić
- Arrangement: Boris Đurđević

Video credits

- Video director: Dario Radusin
- Hair stylist: Martin Posavec for RUŽA
- Make up: Simona Antonović
- Styling: Ivana Karapanđa
- Choreographer: Tamara Despot
- Dancers: Mihael and Damir

== Charts ==
Chart performance for "Nirvana"
Chart (2013)	Peak position
Croatia (HR Top 40)	16
