= Kraljica (song) =

Single by Jelena Rozga

from the album Moderna žena
- Released: 21 June 2015
- Recorded: 2015
- Genre: Pop
- Length: 3:51
- Label: Tonika Records
- Songwriter: Vjekoslava Huljić
- Producers: Tonči Huljić; Leo Škaro

Jelena Rozga singles chronology
"Tsunami" (2014)	"Kraljica" (2015)	"Otrov" (2015)

Music video
- "Kraljica" (Official Video 2015) on YouTube

"Kraljica" is a song by Croatian singer Jelena Rozga. The song was included on her third studio album Moderna Žena (2017). The song was written by Tonči and Vjekoslava Huljić with the production being finished by the former and Croatian producer and instrumentalist Leo Škaro. "Kraljica" was released as a standalone single on 21 June 2015 along with a music video directed by Dario Radusin. To promote the song, Rozga performed it live at the talent show The X Factor Adria and I godina Nova. She also added it to the set list of her live shows and gigs and performed it during the Minut Srca Mog Tour (2022-24).

== Background ==
The song had its premiere in the afternoon of 21 June 2015, with Rozga publishing it along with the music video on her official Facebook page. The singer dedicated "Kraljica" to women who she encouraged to "live every day like queens". Musically, it is an upbeat pop song which describes the shared experience of females with flirtatious men. She is making fun of "primitives" for making fun of and cheating on women.

== Music video ==
The music video for the song was directed by Dario Radusin and premiered on the same day as the song. It shows Rozga in several different fashion combinations while she lip-syncs the lyrics. It opens with her wearing green high heels, denim shorts and a black crop top as she is seen walking next to a brick wall. Other looks include her with a black skirt and a colored shirt. It received more than 400.000 views two days after its release. Her looks in the video were described as "provocative". Ana Kalpacina writing for Srbija Danas wrote that her experimental looks in the video gave "an excellent result". As of May 2026, the video has almost 25 million views on Rozga's official YouTube channel.

== Live performances ==
Rozga promoted the song through several televised appearances. On the same year of its debut, "Kraljica" was performed by Rozga at the grand finale of the Balkan production of the talent show The X Factor Adria. She performed it three years in 2016, 2017 and 2019 at the New Year show in Croatia I godina Nova. On 10 May 2020, during a live online concert that Rozga released on her Instagram and YouTube channels during the lockdowns related to the COVID pandemic, she performed an acoustic version of "Kraljica" accompanied by Milan Terze on guitar and Škaro on her piano. The song was also performed live during her shows and gigs and it was included on the set list of her Minut Srca Mog Tour (2022-24).

== Charts ==
"Kraljica" peaked at number 25 on the Croatian HR Top 40 chart for the week of 10 July 2015 which marked its second week on the chart. The following two weeks, it fell to the positions of number 35 and 36, respectively before completely falling out in its sixth week.

Chart performance for "Kraljica"
Chart (2015)	Peak position
Croatia (HR Top 40)	25
