= Pismo-Glava =

Single by Jelena Rozga

from the album Moderna žena
- Released: 8 December 2016
- Recorded: 2016
- Genre: Pop
- Length: 4:16
- Label: Croatia Records
- Songwriter: Vjekoslava Huljić
- Producer: Tonči Huljić

Jelena Rozga singles chronology
"Nasljednik" (2016)	"Pismo-Glava" (2016)	"Moderna Žena" (2016)

Music video
- "Pismo-Glava" on YouTube

"Pismo-Glava" (English: Head or Tail) is a song by Croatian pop singer Jelena Rozga from her third studio album Moderna žena (2016). "Pismo-Glava" was written by Croatian lyricist and songwriter Vjekoslava Huljić and arranged and produced by Tonči Huljić. "Pismo-Glava" premiered on Naxi Radio in Belgrade, Serbia, on 2 December 2016. It was released as a single through Croatia Records on 8 December 2016. "Pismo-Glava" is an emotional ballad that expresses the love feelings of a female protagonist towards her doubtful male counterpart. Music critics praised the song's sound, who thought it was in the typical style of Rozga. "Pismo-Glava" was commercially successful in Croatia where it managed to debut and peak at number five on the HR Top 40 for the week ending 8 December 2016.

An accompanying music video for "Pismo-Glava" directed by Darko Drinovac premiered on Rozga's official YouTube channel on 8 December 2016. The video, filmed in an autumn setting and in a mansion, shows Rozga singing to the camera, as she appears donned in several dresses and posing for the audience. Rozga's fashion style, overall look and sex-appeal in the clip received praise from critics. "Pismo-Glava" was performed live during a televised appearance at the Večernjakov pečat '18 held on 18 May 2018 in Mostar, Bosnia and Herzegovina.

== Background and reception ==
"Pismo-Glava" had its one-time airplay on 2 December 2016 via Naxi Radio in Belgrade, Serbia. On 8 December 2016, "Pismo-Glava" was released as a single, preceding the album's release by eight days. As with all other songs on the album, "Pismo-Glava" was written by Croatian lyricist and songwriter Vjekoslava Huljić and arranged and produced by Tonči Huljić. The track was arranged by Dušan Vasić and Leo Škaro.

Musically, the song is an emotional ballad that discusses feelings of love of the female protagonist towards her male counterpart, who is doubtful and "wants her a little, then does not want her again". During the chorus, the female protagonist decides to throw a coin, letting head or tail decide while she keeps her eyes closed, despite knowing that regardless on which side the coin falls, she will still choose the love interest she was singing of earlier. During an interview preceding its release, Rozga described the song's conception and lyrics: "'Pismo-Glava' is a song that touched my soul. When I read only the lyrics of the song while the melody was still not ready, I cried and I knew... I have a song for myself and for all women". Critically, the song was described as "wonderful" by writers of both the Croatian newspaper Jutarnji list and the Slovenian website si21.com. A writer of Telegraf.rs felt that "Pismo-Glava" was in the "recognizable pop sound of [Rozga], which according to the opinion of many is the direction which fits her best". A similar description was offered by a journalist from Story.hr, who in a review of Moderna Žena described it as a "classical pop ballad" along with "Cirkus".

In the week following its premiere on the radio, "Pismo-Glava" debuted at number five on the HR Top 40 chart in Croatia for the week ending 8 December 2016. In the following two weeks, the single fell to positions number 13 and 15 on the chart. It was last seen on the chart for the week ending 16 February 2017 at number 39, having spent a total of 11 weeks in the top 40.

== Music video ==
On 2 December 2016, during the radio premiere of "Pismo-Glava", Rozga shared a promotional photograph on her official Instagram account taken from the accompanying music video showing her donned in a golden dress. On 8 December, the clip for the song, directed by Darko Drinovac, was released on the singer's official Facebook page and YouTube channel. John Pavlish served as the director of photography. Rozga's looks were finalized by Saša Joković who was in charge of the make-up, Antonija Nikolić in charge of her hairstyle and Mate Rončević in charge of her overall style. In one of the scenes, the singer is dressed in a red night dress designed by Diana Viljevac.

The music video opens with Rozga walking towards the camera, singing the lyrics of the song, surrounded by leafless trees in an autumn setting. For the opening scenes, she is dressed in a golden gown and has round white and yellow earrings. She soon walks in front of a red platform as cameras surround her. The video then shows her in the inside of a building, donned in a red gown and golden earrings as she sings the lyrics of the song. This is followed by a change of looks as the singer is seen in a white dress in the following scene and again in a light brown coat in the next. This is interspersed with scenes of the singer running in a hallway, posing for the camera and singing next to the trees. In the second half of the song, Rozga appears dressed in a pink dress as the video quickly shows all her looks. A photographer wearing glasses appears next to Rozga and takes pictures of her in several scenes of the video.

Rozga's fashion style in the video was praised by a writer for Net.hr who felt that she shines in the "ellegant" night dress in the music video. A writer for Telegraf.rs also praised her look as "more sex-appealing than ever". Similarly, a writer for the Macedonian newspaper Republika felt that she "never looked more attractive" in the video which was filled with "scenes that set Jelena's sex appeal in the foreground". Additionally, Pavlish's photography work was described as "superb" by Tena Brnad from Lika Club EU. In the first week of its release, the music video for the song had over 1 million views on YouTube.

== Live performances ==
Rozga performed "Pismo-Glava" during a televised appearance at the Večernjakov pečat '18 held in Mostar, Bosnia and Herzegovina, on 18 May. On 3 May 2020, she performed an acoustic version of the song, along with Milan Terze on guitar, during one of her live Instagram home concerts held in the midst of the COVID-19 pandemic.

On 21 March 2018, Rozga recorded tambourine acoustic covers of "Pismo-Glava" and "Bižuterija" which were included on the album Prijatelji Tamburice. This version of the song was arranged by Ervin Malina.

== Charts ==
Chart performance for "Pismo-Glava"
Chart (2016)	Peak position
Croatia (HR Top 40)	5

== Credits and personnel ==
Information related to the credits and personnel of "Pismo-Glava" is taken from the liner notes of the album.

- Jelena Rozga – vocals
- Vjekoslava Huljić – songwriting
- Tonči Huljić – music, arrangement
- Dušan Vasić – arrangement
- Leo Škaro – arrangement
