= Sveto Pismo =

Single by Jelena Rozga
- Released: 27 January 2020
- Recorded: 2019
- Genre: Pop
- Length: 3:37
- Label: Croatia Records
- Songwriter: Vjekoslava Huljić
- Producers: Darko Dimitrov; Željko Joksimović

Jelena Rozga singles chronology
"Moje Proljeće" (2019)	"Sveto Pismo" (2020)	"Kad Nema Ljubavi" (2020)

Music video
- "Sveto Pismo" on YouTube

"'Sveto Pismo" (English: The Holy Scripture) is a song by Croatian pop singer Jelena Rozga. It was written by Vjekoslava Huljić, arranged by Tonči Huljić and produced by Darko Dimitrov and Željko Joksimović. It was released as a single through Croatia Records on 27 January 2020 along with an accompanying music video directed by Dario Radusin. Musically, "Sveto Pismo" is a pop ballad, sung from the perspective of a woman who is wondering whether love is enough for a relationship to be maintained. Commercially, the song achieved moderate success in Croatia, peaking at number five on the HR Top 40. The music video for the song is watched 4.3 million times as of May 2022.

== Background and composition ==
"Sveto Pismo" was written by Vjekoslava Huljić, arranged by Tonči Huljić and produced by Darko Dimitrov and Željko Joksimović. It was released almost a year after the singer's last single since she did not want to rush through the process. Lyrically, the song poses the question of whether "love is enough" for a relationship to survive the "problems and temptations or is something more necessary". Musically, "Sveto Pismo" is similar to songs from the beginning of the singer's career.

== Music video and live performances ==
A music video for the song, directed by Dario Radusin was released on 27 January 2020 and was filmed in Dubrovnik. A writer of Dnevnik praised the singer for her successful portrayal of emotions. Dubrovnik was chosen as the location to film the video due to its "romantic" atmosphere and attraction. Rozga performed the song on 28 January at the 2020 Music Awards Ceremony (MAC) show in Belgrade. The following month, Rozga appeared on the Macedonian Golden Ladybug of Popularity awards show, where she also performed "Sveto Pismo" along with a medley of "Cirkus", "Ne pijem, ne pušim" and "Dani su bez broja" during the show. On 19 April 2020, during a series of concerts held at home due to the COVID-19 pandemic, Rozga performed an acoustic rendition of "Sveto Pismo" on Instagram Live and later YouTube.

== Credits and personnel ==
Credits for the song and the music video are taken from the description of the song on YouTube. "Sveto pismo" samples Doris Dragojević's "Nespokoj" (1997) from the album Živim po svom.

Song credits

- Music: Tonči Huljić
- Lyrics: Vjekoslava Huljić
- Arrangement: Darko Dimitrov / Željko Joksimović

Video credits

- Directed by: Dario Radusin
- Photo: Petar Vilović
- Make-up: Saša Joković
- Hair: Salon Franić
- Suits: Twins
- Styling: Mate Rončević

== Charts ==
Chart performance for "Sveto Pismo"
Chart (2020)	Peak position
Croatia (HR Top 40)	5
