= Idi Ti =

Single by Jelena Rozga
- Released: 26 June 2023
- Recorded: 2023
- Genre: Pop
- Length: 4:38
- Label: Croatia Records
- Songwriter: Vjekoslava Huljić
- Producer: Tonči Huljić

Jelena Rozga singles chronology
"Samo se ljubit' isplati" (2023)	"Idi Ti" (2023)	"Od Čega Sam Ja" (2024)

Music video
- "Idi Ti" (Melodije Hrvatskog Jadrana) on YouTube

"Idi Ti" (English: You Go) is a song by Croatian pop singer Jelena Rozga. The song was written by Vjekoslava Huljić and produced by Tonči Huljić. Rozga performed the song live at the Melodije Hrvatskog Jadrana on 26 June 2023 after which "Idi Ti" was released as a single. It is a heartfelt ballad which features the singer's upper vocal register.

Upon its release, "Idi Ti" received positive comments from the singer's fanbase. The single was commercially successful, peaking at number 16 on the Croatian HR Top 40 for the week ending 2 July 2023. The singer also announced an accompanying music video for the song and promoted it by performing it live during her regional concerts.

== Background ==
"Idi ti" was written by Vjekoslava Huljić and produced by Tonči Huljić. It had its live premiere at the Melodije Hrvatskog Jadrana on 26 June 2023. During an interview given briefly after the song's performance, the singer described it as the "favorite one" Vjekoslava wrote for her. The song contains heartfelt lyrics about a broken-hearted female protagonist. The lyrics, which included a metaphor referring to "holes in the floor" was the point of discussion among the singer's fans.

In August of the same year, the song received a Cesarica Award in the category Hit of the Month. Upon its release, "Idi Ti" was mostly well received by Rozga's fanbase, who were mainly "amazed" by the lyrics and vocal showcase.

== Live performances ==
On 26 June 2023, Rozga performed "Idi Ti" at the Melodije Hrvatskog Jadrana 2023; despite her promise not to perform at festivals, Rozga changed her mind when finding out it was Tomislav Mrduljaš organizing the event. For the performance, she appeared donning a purple dress while the scene was illuminated by a blue light. As of April 2024, the video has over 2.2 million views on the video-streaming platform YouTube. The singer performed the song live in 2023 during a gig in Bitola held on 7 August 2023.

== Credits and personnel ==
Credits for the song are taken from the YouTube description of the live performance video.

- Music: Tonči Huljić
- Lyrics: Vjekoslava Huljić
- Arrangement: Tonči Huljić, Hrvoje Domazet

== Charts ==
For the week ending 26 June 2023, "Idi Ti" debuted at number 16 on the Croatian HR Top 40. The single peaked at number 12. The single was seen on the chart for the last time for the week ending 29 October 2023, at the position of 38, after spending 18 weeks there.

Chart performance for "Idi Ti"
Chart (2023)	Peak position
Croatia (HR Top 40)	12
