= Jelena Rozga =

Croatian singer (born 1977)

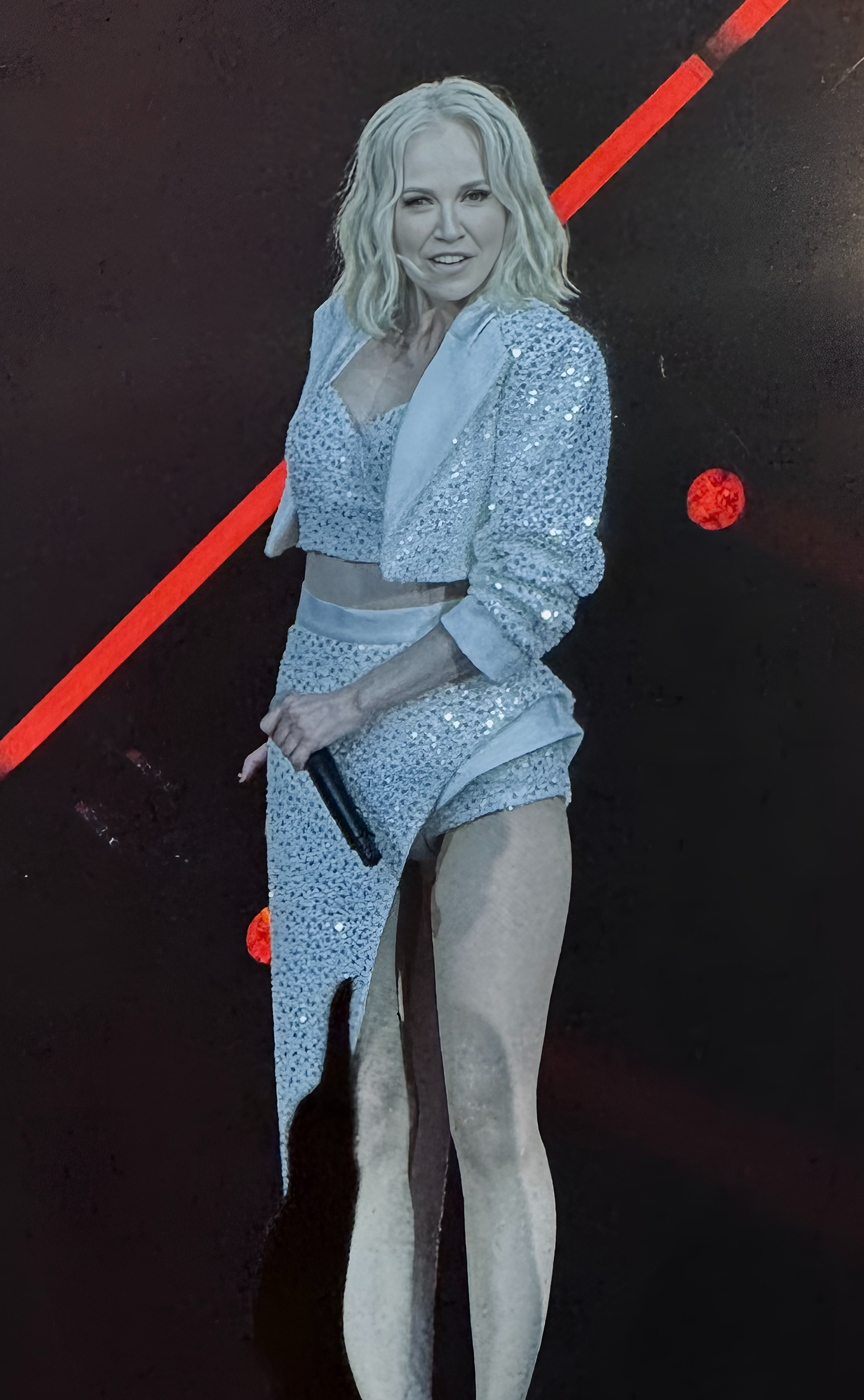
- Rozga in 2024
- Born: 23 August 1977 (age 49); Split, SR Croatia, Yugoslavia
- Occupations: Singer; actress; model; activist
- Years active: 1996–present
- Height: 5 ft 7 in (1.70 m)
- Parents: Marija Rozga; Ante Rozga
- Relatives: Julija Ćuk
- Musical career
- Genres: Pop; folk; electropop
- Instrument: Vocals
- Labels: Tonika Records; Hit Records; Croatia Records
- Formerly of: Magazin
- Website: www.jelenarozga.com

Jelena Rozga (born 23 August 1977) is a Croatian pop, folk, and electropop singer. Born and raised in Split, Croatia, Rozga was a ballet dancer as a child. She rose to fame in 1996, when she became the lead singer of Magazin, a pop band famous in former Yugoslavia. She served as the band's lead singer until 2006, releasing a total of five studio albums. During the ten years, the band released numerous commercially and critically successful singles including "Ginem", "Minut' srca tvog" and "Minus i plus" among others.

In 2006, Rozga launched a solo career with the release of her debut studio album Oprosti Mala (English: Forgive me Little One). The album was a major commercial and critical success that established her status as a solo artist. It peaked on top of the Croatian Albums Chart and produced several commercially successful singles, including "Gospe moja" (English: My Lady), "Oprosti mala" (English: Forgive Little One), and "Ne zovi me Marija" (English: Don't Call Me Marija). Rozga's second studio album Bižuterija (2011; English: Bijouterie) produced the eponymous number-one lead single as well as singles "Rodit ću ti 'ćer i sina" (English: I Will Give Birth to Your Daughter and Son) and "Ona ili ja" (English: Her or me). In support of the album, Rozga launched her first headlining tour, The Bižuterija Tour (2010–2012). She became the first Croatian female artist ever to sell out a concert at the Spaladium Arena.

Moderna žena (English: Modern Woman), the singer's third studio album, was released in 2016, and featured some of her most famous singles as a solo artist to date, including "Nirvana", "Kraljica" (English: Queen), and "Tsunami". Moderna žena was Rozga's third studio album to top the Croatian Albums Chart and to receive a gold certification by the Croatian Phonographic Association. It further became the best-selling album of the year in Croatia. On 14 November 2022, Rozga released her first acoustic compilation album Minut Srca Mog and embarked on the regional Minut Srca Mog Tour (2022–23) in its promotion. The following three years saw the release of hit singles "Samo se ljubit' isplati", "Idi ti", "Od čega sam ja", "Lavica", "Začarani krug" and "Božić je".

In addition to her singing career, Rozga also shortly ventured in acting and voiceovers. She is considered to be one of the most famous singers in Croatia, having received gold certifications for three solo albums and having won numerous awards, including the Grand Prix award at the Split Festival. She has also enjoyed wider regional success and popularity in Serbia, Montenegro, North Macedonia, Bosnia and Herzegovina, and Slovenia.

== Early life ==
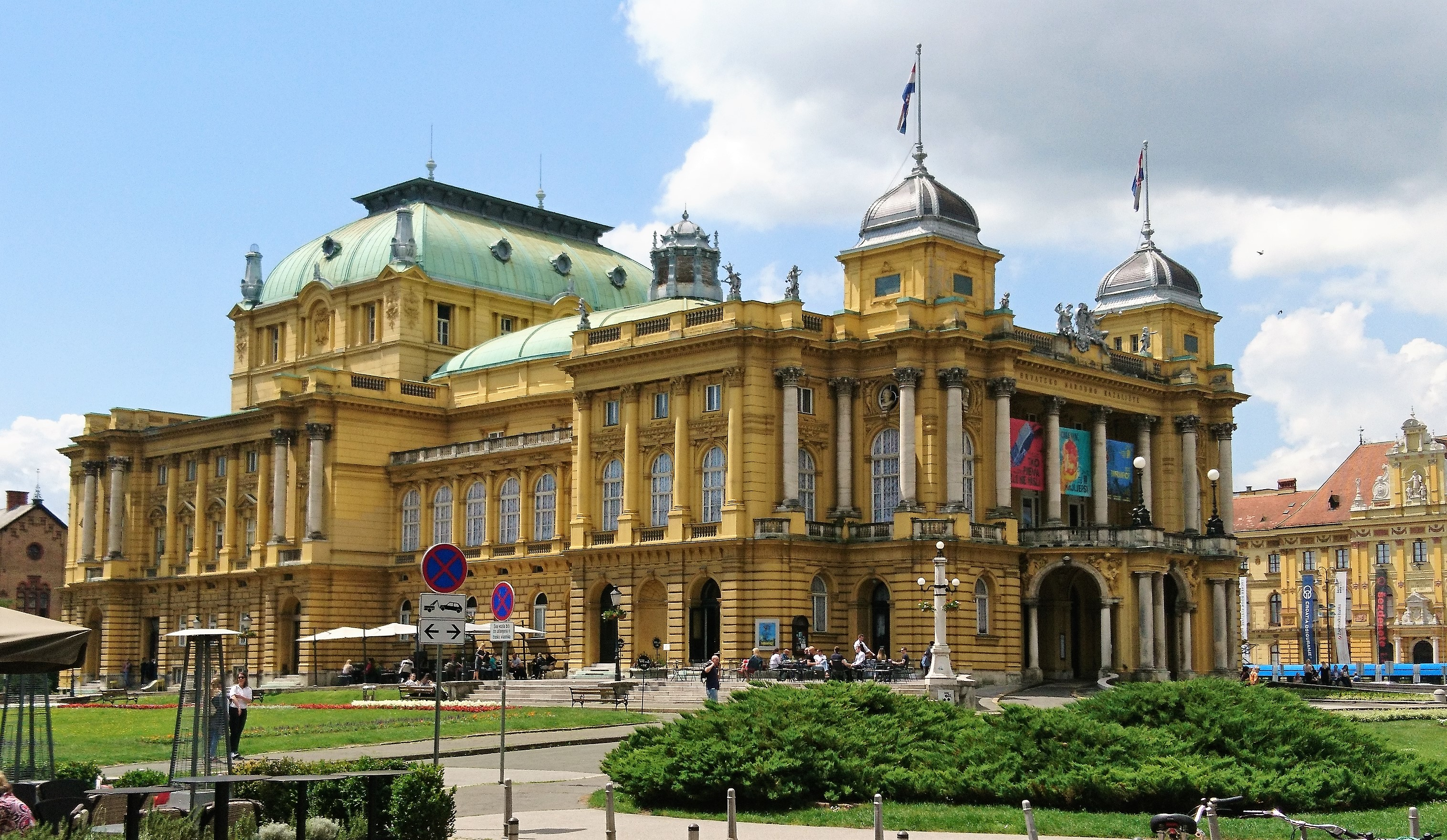
The Croatian National Theatre in Zagreb where Rozga started participating in ballet classes

Jelena Rozga was born on 23 August 1977, to mother Marija Rozga, a tailor in the company Jugoplastika, and father Antonio Rozga in Split, a city in the region of Dalmatia, Croatia. Rozga has one older sister named Julija Ćuk. Rozga was a hyperactive and energetic child who often danced and performed in her house. She insisted on becoming a ballet dancer and her parents sent her to ballet classes during the first grade of primary school when she was seven years old. She joined KUD Mozaik where she was under the guidance of Lepa Smoje, a famous Croatian choreographer. As a ballet dancer, she participated in various Yugoslav competitions and was deemed the biggest ballet talent in the country.

At the age of 13, Rozga was invited to participate in the opera house La Scala in Milan. Her parents, who could not afford moving abroad, could not let her participate. During her teenage years, Rozga first joined the high school in Split and after deciding to pursue her passion for dancing, she auditioned to join the ballet ensemble of the Croatian National Theatre in Zagreb. She was accepted by the commission which was amazed by her dancing talents. Together with the group, she started performing in various localized productions of the plays Swan Lake, Sleeping Beauty and The Nutcracker among others. Rozga later revealed that the ballet classes she did as a child "shaped me as a woman [...] it gave me order, dedication and discipline in life".

During an interview for the Croatian TV channel Croatian Music Channel, Rozga revealed that even as a ballet dancer in her childhood, she had a big passion for singing and her dream, if she were ever to venture in a music career, would be to join Croatian pop band Magazin, whose lead singer at that time, Ljiljana Nikolovska, served as a source of inspiration for her. Rozga was also an avid fan of the band, whose songs she knew by heart. In 1992, Rozga received an award at a singing competition where she performed the song "Uvenut će ružmarin" (English: The Rosemary Will Wither) by Magazin. In 1994, she participated in another competition, Zvuci Jadrana (English: Sounds of the Adriatic), where she received the award Zlatna Gospa for best performance for her rendition of Magazin's "Ti si želja mog života" (English: You Are the Desire of My Life).

== Career ==
=== 1996–2006: Magazin ===
When Rozga was at the age of 18, her mother who saw that Magazin's lead singer at that time, Danijela Martinović, was leaving the group, contacted group leader Tonči Huljić, informing him about her daughter's interest in auditioning for the group. Rozga's mother also gave Huljić a picture of her daughter and home cassettes with audio recordings of her home performances. Even before hearing her sing, Huljić decided to contract Rozga based on how "powerful" and unusual her surname sounded. He traveled to Split where Rozga auditioned for five minutes, performing "only a song and a half", including "Opusti se" (English: Relax) and "Zlato ljubavi" (English: My Dear Love). Shortly after hearing her sing, Tonči Huljić worked on "Aha" together with his wife, Vjekoslava Huljić, which was the first song Rozga had ever recorded. Subsequently, Rozga stopped her ballet classes and embarked on her musical career in the group Magazin. In 1996, she performed "Aha" on Dora, the Croatian song contest for Eurovision that year, where she finished second. For the performance of the song, she appeared dressed as a ballerina and performed a dance choreography similar to The Nutcracker.

That same year, at the age of 18, she signed a deal with Tonika Records, thus succeeding Danijela Martinović as the lead singer of Magazin. The first song she recorded with the group was "Suze Biserne" which the band also performed at the 1996 Melodije hrvatskog Jadrana. The song instantly became popular among fans of the group and at the 1996 Melodije hrvatskog Jadrana, it was recognized as the most performed song of the year. In 1996, Magazin released their first album together with Rozga, and their twelfth overall studio album titled Nebo boje moje ljubavi. The album was a big commercial success receiving a golden certification in Croatia. It produced several hit songs, including the widely famous singles "Suze Biserne", "Opijum" and "Minut' srca tvog" as well as "Nebo boje moje ljubavi" and "Samo navika". In 1997, Magazin competed at Dora with the song "Opijum", finishing seventh. Several months after, the band also participated at the Melodijama Hrvatskog Jadrana (MHJ) where they performed the song "Ime mi spominje". In 1998, the group's second studio album with Rozga, Da si ti ja was released; it was a commercial success in the region of former Yugoslavia, receiving a platinum certification in Croatia and Slovenia. The album produced several commercially successful singles, including "Gutljaj vina", "Ginem", "Na svijetu sve" and "Idi i ne budi ljude". The songs nevertheless were not well received by music critics due to their "easy" and simple lyrics.

In 1999, Magazin performed at Dora with the song "Kasno je" and at the MHJ '99, they performed "Ako poludim". Minus i plus, the band's third album with Rozga, was released in 2000 and also included a streak of commercially successful singles such as the title song, "Je l' zbog nje", "Nemam snage da se pomirim" and "Ako poludim". The band performed "Hrvatska rapsodija" from the album at the 2000 Dora Festival and then "Nemam snage da se pomirim" at the Runjićev Festival. The fourth studio album S druge strane mjeseca saw the release of several singles including the eponymous song, "Ko me zove?" and "Ne vjerujem tebi, ne vjerujem sebi"; the last was performed at the MHJ '02. The band also performed for the first time at the 2002 festival Zlatne žice Slavonije with the song "Hajde, kaži kako".

The last album Magazin released with Rozga was Paa..? and it included the hit singles "Ne tiče me se", "Troši i uživaj", "Kad bi bio blizu", "Da li znaš da te ne volim" and "Slatko, ljuto, kiselo". In promotion of the album, the band performed "Kad bi bio blizu" at the 2003 Radijski festival and "Da li znaš da te ne volim" at the Split Festival. In 2004, the band won at the Split Music Festival with the song "Ne tiče me se" and performed at the Zlatne žice Slavonije festival with the song "Često". The band competed at the Dora 2005 with the Biblical-themed song "Nazaret" featuring Ervin, placing second. In 2006, Rozga left the group, after having been the lead singer for ten years. She continued collaborating with Tonči Huljić, the founder of the band.

=== 2006–2009: Oprosti Mala ===
Even during her time in the group, Rozga started appearing as a solo artist. In 2003, she impersonated Kylie Minogue by performing "I Should Be So Lucky" on Pink TV's New Year's Eve program "Vesele '80e". The video was uploaded on the nonamebg channel on 29 August 2009. In 2004, he recorded the song "šta ti je svit" ("What Is the World"), written by the Huljić duo, composed by Remi Kazinoti and featuring Jelena Rozga; it served as the opening song for the first Croatian TV soap opera Villa Maria. An accompanying music video with the two singing in front of the piano while a pair of young people dance is also incorporated. She also performed "Piši mi" in 2006 at the Lisinski theater during the concert "Noć zvijezda, noć hitova" by Nenad Ninčević.

Rozga recorded and released her debut solo album Oprosti Mala in 2006; the album was a commercial success reaching the top of the Croatian Albums Chart. That same year, she performed the album's title song featuring Magazin at the 2006 Dora national festival which marked her debut solo performance. Oprosti Mala produced six singles including "Oprosti mala", "Ne zovi me Marija, "Ja znam dobro što mi je", "Sve se meni čini da", "Nemam" and "Gospe moja". In 2006, Rozga took part in the Dora national song festival with "Ne zovi me Marija" which finished 6th. Rozga performed "Gospe moja" at the 2007 Split Festival where the song also received the Grand Prix award. In 2007, Rozga impersonated Sharon Stone in the movie Basic Instinct on HRT1.

During interviews, Rozga revealed that the transition from Magazin to a solo career was a challenging and difficult period that caused a lot of stress and health problems. She revealed that she was unaware of all the responsibilities and independent decisions a solo career would bring along and experienced disappointment when some of her initial concerts were attended by small audiences. Huljić also revealed that the initial period of transition involved searching for the sound the audience expected of Rozga and that it took almost four years before they could find her sound.

Rozga's career rapidly moved upwards, especially in 2008 when she received the Grand Prix at the Split Music Festival for having the most played song from the previous year's festival's edition for "Gospe moja". She then released single "Daj šta daš" which topped charts both in Croatia and other neighbouring countries. The song also won the Grand Prix in 2009 for being the most played song from last year's festival edition. Two other singles were released in 2008, including "Djevica" and "Ožiljak". In 2009, Rozga performed on Hrvatski Radijski Festival with "Svega ima, al' bi još" in the category of pop-folk music. On 17 October 2009, Rozga appeared on Severina's concert in Belgrade, where she performed "Suze biserne" on stage. She also praised her performance, saying the following, "The concert was amazing. The audience was phenomenal and everything was great... The organization was of very high quality, Seve is a real professional, Seve went through a lot, she has been in this job for very long but stage anxiety is present. All praises to her." Rozga performed at the 2009 Split Festival with "Rodit ću ti 'ćer i sina", and the year after, 2010, for the third time in a row, she won the Grand Prix for the most played song ("Rodit ću ti 'ćer i sina"). The end of the year saw the release of, "Nevjeran do groba", a duet with Miligram and "Ostavit ću svitlo", a duet with Klapa Iskon.

=== 2009–2011: Bižuterija ===
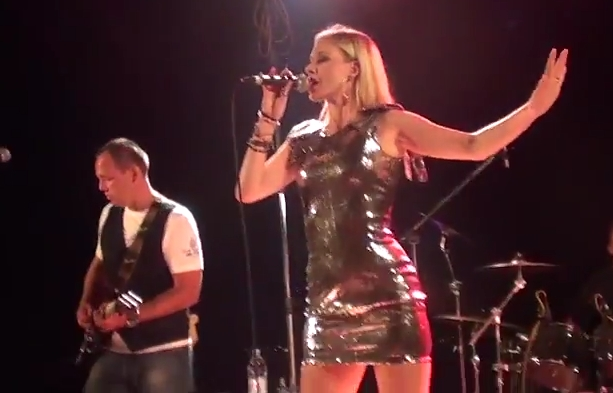
Rozga performing in 2011

In May 2010, she collaborated with Željko Samardžić on the song "Ima nade", and the accompanying music video was filmed in Split by Željko Petres. In 2010, after its debut at the Split Festival, "Bižuterija" became the most played song of the summer and a number-one single both in Croatia and in the whole Balkans. The song is considered a turning point in her career as it gained very high popularity. As of 2024, the audio and the official music video for the song have combined more than 50 million views on YouTube. In early 2011 Rozga released her second studio album Bižuterija which sold over 15,000 copies within a month of its release, thus earning a gold certification from the Croatian Phonographic Association. The album produced several hit singles, including the title song, "Karantena", "Ona ili ja" and "Rodit ću ti 'ćer i sina". To promote the album, Rozga embarked on The Bižuterija Tour in all major cities in Croatia, starting with a concert held in Zadar on 27 October 2011. Rozga became the first female artist that sold out all the tickets at the Spaladium Arena (with a capacity of around 12,000) in her hometown of Split on 11 February 2011. Several months later, she also had another sold-out concert in Zagreb at the Cibona hall.

That same year, Rozga won a Porin award (Croatia's version of the Grammys) in the category Hit of the Year with "Bižuterija" at the 18th ceremony. The award caused controversy as it won the most votes by the audience but many Croatian music artists and critics dismissed it. Later that spring, she collaborated with the rap group Connection on the song "Dalmatinka" which became a summer hit. In the summer of 2011, she performed "Razmažena" at the Split Festival and won another Grand Prix for getting the most votes from the audience. The music video for the song, directed by Gitak TV and released on 18 October, features Rozga dressed as a bride and eloping from her wedding after a short conversation with a priest. She was noticed filming the video on 25 September 2011 at a hotel in Split.

By the end of 2011, she released her double-CD Best of compilation. The first disc of the album features the greatest hits of her solo career and the second disc, her greatest hits in the years with Magazin (1996–2006). In November, that same year Rozga had her first solo concert at the Sava Center in Belgrade and in December she embarked the Karlovačko live 2011. co-headlining tour with the band Bajaga i instruktori during which she visited all major cities in Croatia.

=== 2012–2017: Moderna žena ===
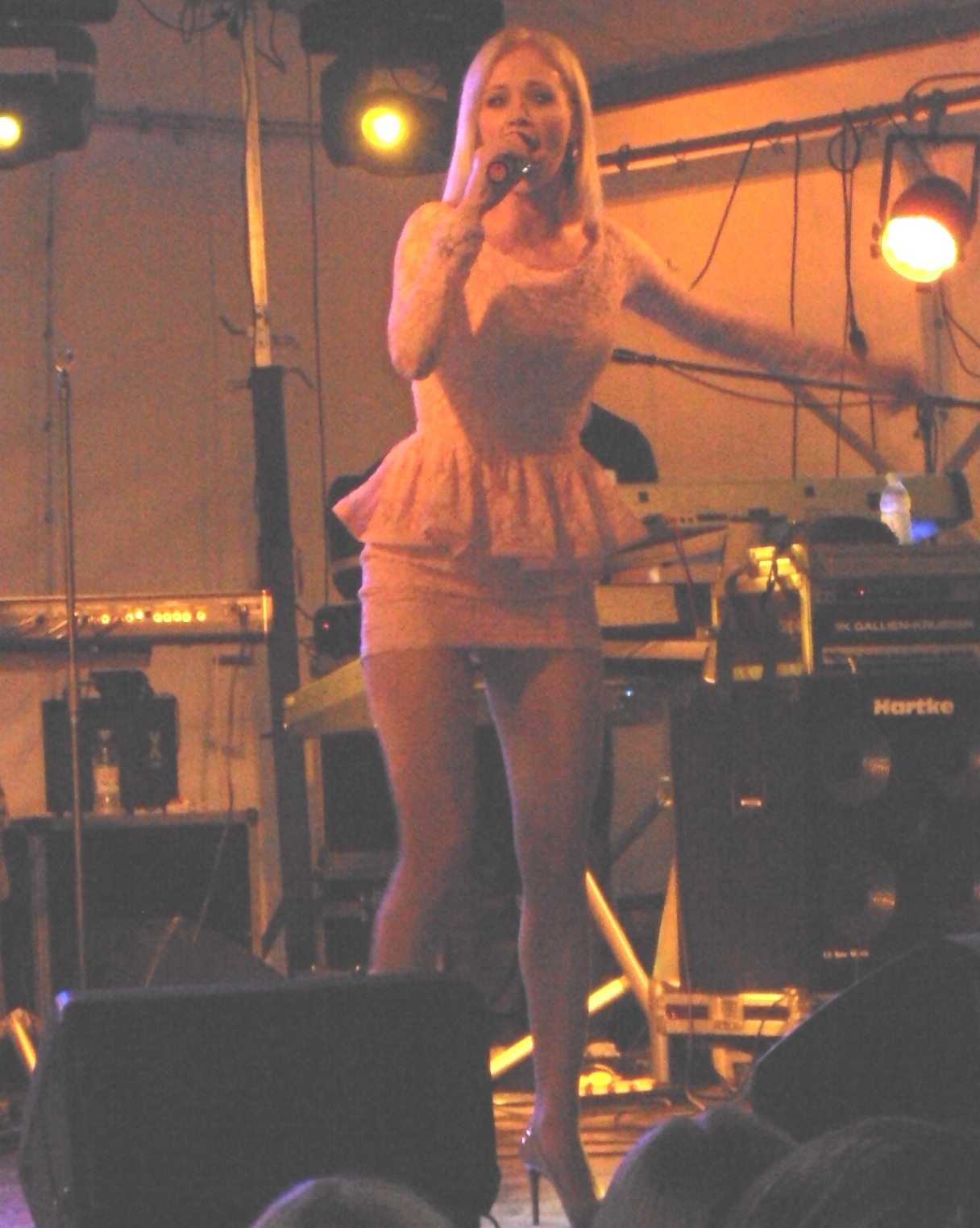
Rozga performing in Bjelovar, 2012

On 3 March 2012, Rozga released "Zanemari" along with a music video directed by Darko Drinovac on 23 April 2012. At the 2012 Split Festival, she performed the song "Solo igračica" which got her the Srebrni galeb award i.e. second place by audience selection. Rozga simultaneously released her summer single "Dobitna kombinacija". After a couple of months, she filmed music videos for both singles in Sarajevo under the direction of GOTIVA Sarajevo. The music video, released on 27 September 2012, combined both songs into one, thus creating a short movie with an overarching theme. This made Rozga the first singer both in Croatia and neighboring countries to make such an attempt. On 26 March 2013, Rozga released the single "Nirvana", which garnered controversy due to a part of the lyric and achieved huge success in all former Yugoslav countries. As of 2024, the music video for the song is the second most watched on Rozga's YouTube channel with 42 million views.

That same summer, she released the song "Obožavam", and in November, 2013, the power ballad "Cirkus". The songs peaked at numbers 5 and 2 on the Croatian Singles Chart, respectively. A music video directed by Dejan Milićević and filmed in Belgrade was released for the latter song on 23 December 2013. Rozga performed the song as a premiere on 2 November 2013 during the HRT show Tanc sa zvijezdama.

In the beginning of 2014, on 24 January, Rozga released the ballad "Prsti zapleteni" in collaboration with I. Brnas and Pero Kozomara featuring Klapa Rišpet. On 14 March 2014, Rozga released "Okus mentola", an uptempo song which quickly became a hit single. Its music video was noted for showing a sexier version of Rozga. It has over 25 million views on the singer's YouTube channel as of 2020.

The same summer, she released the song "Život je čudo" written by the pair Huljić and arranged by Dragan Tašković Taške and Boris Krstajić. The song was presented to fans through Naxi radio in Belgrade, where she flew to. She shared how she worked on the song for a very long time and that she felt nervous when the video was released. She also released how, as the title suggests, she sees her life as a "big miracle" that is unpredictable and that has to be filled with a lot of persistence, work, love and support from relatives. A music video filmed at the beach and the mountains directed by Darko Radusin was released the same day. Rozga is seen wearing costumes by Juraj Zigman. On 20 July, she promoted the music video through an interview with Serbian Telegraf where she also spoke about how performing is her secret to remaining thin and her dreams of a wedding are conflicted, sometimes imagining an intimate one, sometimes dreaming of a grandiose one. She finished the interview by replying how she would never forgive infidelity. When asked who the most sex appealing Serbian politician was, she adamantly replied that she would not allow politics be mixed with her music.

The song "Odo' ja" recorded for the soundtrack of the popular television show Kud puklo da puklo was released on 6 November 2014. On 9 December 2014, Rozga released "Tsunami", a single which became one of her biggest hits within the shortest amount of time. Within 24 hours of its release, the song was viewed more than 400,000 times on YouTube, becoming the most viewed video by the singer in a day. As of 2024, the song has over 59 million views on YouTube, making it Rozga's most watched video on the platform.

2015 saw the release of the singles "Kraljica" on 21 June and "Otrov" on 27 November. That same year, she appeared on the nineteenth episeode of the seventh season of the Ami G show in Serbia where she sang acoustic versions of "Minut srca mog" and "Zar je ljubav spala na to" accompanied by Marinko Madžgalj and Ognjen and "Luna" from Magazin album Da si ti ja (1998). She also played a brief dice game and put makeup on Ognjen's face.

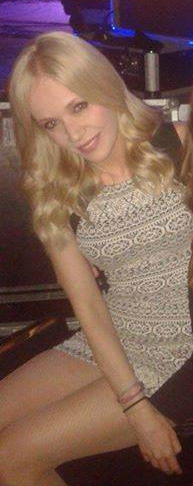
Rozga in 2015

Following a short hiatus from new music, Rozga released the ballad "Udajem se" as a single on 16 February 2016. On 29 February 2016, Rozga appeared on then narodni radio and performed cover versions of "Kao da me nema tu" by Vanna, "Malo mi za sriću triba" by Doris Dragović, "Prijatelji stari" by Tereza Kesovija, "Dobrodošao u klub" by Severina and "Čarobno jutro" by Nina Badrić. On 15 July 2016, the song "Nasljednik" was released as a summer single. A music video directed by Dario Radusin shows Rozga in a pink and black swimsuit along with three other male models. They are shown interacting with each other, splashing water and showcasing their physique. This was followed by the release of the ballad "Pismo-Glava" on 8 December 2016 and the title song "Moderna žena" on 16 December 2016, along with accompanying music videos directed by Darko Drinovac and Dario Radusin, respectively.

Six years after the release of her previous album, on 16 December 2016, Rozga released her third studio album Moderna žena through Croatia Records. The album was released in a dual-disc format: the first disc contained 6 new songs and 5 previously released singles, and the second disk contained her older singles released in the period between 2011 and 2014. In the first week of its release, Moderna žena debuted atop the Croatian Albums Chart and it remained there for 11 consecutive weeks and 17 weeks in total after its release. Only 3 months after its release, the album received a gold certification and sold over 5,000 copies. The album became the best-selling record of the year in Croatia in 2017. It was nominated for the Best Pop Album at the 2017 Porin Awards held on 17 March 2017. On 16 December 2016, the song "Prava Koke" for the soundtrack of the musical Matilda was released through Dallas Records.

The song "Žileti", written by Saša Lazić and arranged by Aca Krsmanović was released as the third single from the album on 16 March 2017. The song received around 210,000 views in one day and more than 600,000 views in one week. On 14 February 2017, Rozga appeared on the Serbian Dobro Jutro program where she was interviewed by Jovana Joksimović and Srđan Predojević about the release of her album. She also discussed the broadening of her musical style and her relationship status.

On 11 April 2017, Rozga released the last single from the album, titled "Ne pijem, ne pušim" along with a music video directed by Dario Radusin and inspired by Robert Palmer's "Addicted to Love". That same summer saw the release of two new songs; the ballad "Rodjena sam", written by Robert Pilepić and arranged by Pero Kozomara in June and "Svjetla neona" written by the Huljić pair, in July. On 13 November 2017, Rozga performed "Prsten na sto" at the Lisinski theater together with Montenegrin singer Sergej Ćetković. She also appeared on the ninth season of Ami G's show together with guests Milica Todorović, Zorica Brunclik and Miroljub Aranđelović Kemiš. She performed a modified version of her song "Nirvana" about drinking alcohol, spoke about her first kiss and danced a belly dance together with Todorović.

=== 2018–2020: new singles and performances ===
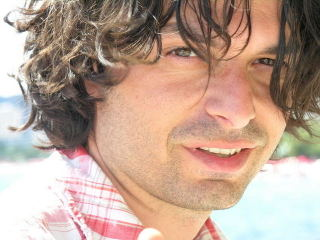
Rozga collaborated with Macedonian producer Darko Dimitrov (pictured) on two songs, "Ostani" and "Sveto pismo"

On 27 March 2018, following a tour in Australia, Rozga released a new single titled "Najbolji dan", written by Tonči and Vjekoslava Huljić along with a music video directed by Sandra Mihaljević. On 29 May 2018, Rozga appeared on Narodni radio where she performed at the Living Room Acoustic and gave an interview; her acoustic live medley of "Oprosti mala", "Opijum" and "S druge strane mjeseca" has been watched more than 24 million times as of 2024. On 20 July, the same year, Rozga released another single titled "Uzmem koliko mi daš" written by the pair Huljić, along with a music video directed by Dario Radusin filmed in Istria. In September, Rozga released another song, titled "Ostani" written by Serbian singer-songwriter Emina Jahović and produced by Macedonian producer Darko Dimitrov. The song and its accompanying music video received a lot of media attention due to a change in the singer's image and sound. Within the first 24 hours of its release, the song received 350,000 views, which is the second most watched music video by the singer within the first day after "Tsunami" which received 400,000 views in a day. That same year, Rozga appeared on the eleventh season of the Ami G show, where she sat for an interview and performed songs "Minut i plus" and "Kad bi bio blizu" together with then up and rising singer Angellina. She recalled how the former song was criticized when first released. At the end of her guest appearance, she was challenged to sing "Bižuterija" while listening to loud interfering music through headphones.

On 29 January 2019, Rozga released a ballad titled "Moje Proljeće" written by Jahović and produced by Darko Dimitrov. She performed the song on the same day at the 2019 Music Awards Ceremony (MAC) show in Belgrade. A music video for the song, portraying an emotional Rozga singing the song and wandering in a snowy forest, directed by Dario Radusin, was released the same day. It garnered 2 million views on YouTube in a week and received widespread praise from her fanbase. On 25 September 2019, Rozga participated in then narodni radio's program "Koncert u tvom domu" ("Concert at Your Home") with which she appeared at the place of a Croatian pair and performed "Oprosti Mala" among other songs.

On 5 January 2020, Rozga was featured on a video by Salon Franić where she discussed the hairstyles the hairdresser created for her through the years. On 28 January 2020, Rozga released "Sveto Pismo" which she also performed at the 2020 MAC Awards Show. The song was written by Tonči and Vjekoslava Huljić and the production was arranged by Darko Dimitrov and Serbian singer Željko Joksimović. The following month, Rozga appeared on the Macedonian Golden Ladybug of Popularity awards show, where she received the award for Most Popular Regional Singer. She also performed "Sveto Pismo" and a medley of "Cirkus", "Ne pijem, ne pušim" and "Dani su bez broja" during the show. Starting on 12 April 2020 and concluding on 17 May 2020, during the COVID-19 pandemic, Rozga streamed seven weekly mini live concerts through Instagram Live and YouTube during which she performed acoustic covers of her songs from her living room.

=== 2020–2023: new singles, Minut Srca Mog and tour ===
On 20 December 2019, Rozga was a guest on Daniela Trbović's late night talk show 5.com s Danielom together with chef David Skoko. The two sat down for an interview, discussing a variety of topics, including Rozga's ballet classes, ballet dances, cooking, the topics of Rozga's songs. Rozga recounted how overworked she was when in Magazin, how the lead singer was expected to only work with no right to speak which led to her losing consciousness at a night club, falling down on the floor and having to go to the emergency while bleeding. During the same show, she felt embarrassed by Trbović's constant questions about cooking and her attempts to humiliate her because of it, which she clearly stated she has no experience with from the beginning. At one point, Trbović attempted to set Rozga up with Skoko, even though the latter is married and has three children; Rozga simply ignored her. In late 2019, Rozga revealed that she was working on an acoustic album which would feature 17 acoustic reworks of her songs with Magazin. The inspiration for the album came after the popularity of her acoustic cover on narodni Radio's live event. The album was set for release some time in 2020 although due to the COVID-19 pandemic, Rozga revealed that its release will be postponed for 2021 since she scrapped the work initially done and started from scratch.

On 12 November 2020, Rozga released a cover of the song "Kad nema ljubavi" by Croatian singer Ilan Kabiljo as part of the project New Sound of the 90s. She had performed the song as part of a medley with "Sveto Pismo" and a cover of Oliver Dragojević's "Najlipše te jubi oni što te gubi" live in March earlier that year at the 2020 Golden Studio Awards. On 7 December 2020, Rozga appeared on Narodni radio's Christmas Living Room where she performed an acoustic cover of Petar Grašo's "Fritula". On 8 December 2020, Rozga appeared on the 9th gathering of the HEP Opskrba where she had an interview and performed acoustic versions of five songs. On 25 December, on Christmas, Rozga held an online live concert on Instagram accompanied by Milan Terze and Karlo Dotur on guitar.

On 16 April 2021, as a celebration of 25 years spent in the music industry, Rozga collaborated on a rework of "Suze Biserne" with Tonči Huljić & Madre Badessa Band for the album Inamorana (2021) released through Croatia Records. Huljić planned and announced that a concept for a music video for the rework exists. On 5 June 2021, Rozga performed a medley of Nataša Bekvalac's songs "Dobro moje", "Nikotin" and "Original" and rearranged versions of "Cirkus" and "Minut' srca tvog" at the 2021 MAC Awards show. She also sat down for an interview at the show together with the former artist. The summer of 2021 saw Rozga touring in various cities in Croatia, Serbia, North Macedonia and Slovenia. On 15 December 2021, "Ti i Ja", a collaboration between Rozga and Saša Matić included on the latter's studio album Dva života, was released along with an accompanying music video. On 18 January 2022, Rozga appeared on the Ami G show in Belgrade where she gave an interview, performed Oliver Dragojević's "Skalinada", Lepa Brena's "Golube", Minea's "Rano", "Minus i plus", "Ginem", "Tamara", "Put putujem" and sang a duet of "Ti i Ja" with Matić. She was accompanied by him on piano for all songs. On 19 May 2022, Rozga appeared at narodni Living Room acoustic where she performed the songs "Ne pijem, ne pušim", "Solo igračica" and a medley of "Nebo boje moje ljubavi", "Minut' srca tvog" and "Ginem". She also gave a short interview where she announced a concert at the Fusion World Music Festival on 19 July 2022 and one at the Zagreb Arena on 17 December 2022 which will serve as the first one that is part of her regional tour, titled the Minut Srca Mog Tour. The tour had concerts in other major cities in the region, such as Split, Belgrade, Skopje, Sarajevo and Ljubljana. For the tour's choreography, Rozga used some of the ballet dances that she learnt during her childhood classes.

On 15 September 2022, Rozga confirmed that the title of the acoustic compilation album would be Minut Srca Mog in reference to her 1996 eponymous single. The first acoustic cover of the song, "Zar je ljubav spala na to" featuring Matija Cvek and produced by Srđan Sekulović – Skansi, was released on the same day along with a music video. The single was successful on the HR Top 40, the country's airplay chart, where it peaked at number four for the week ending 29 August 2022. The singer revealed during an interview that only the opening song with Cvek was rearranged musically, while the rest of the album songs were included in their original form, played and sung live with the addition of instruments such as strings, French harmonicas and Mediterranean mandolins. On 21 October 2022, "Grizem", originally from Rozga's second studio album Bižuterija (2011), was released as the second single off the album along with a visuals video directed by Dario Radusin. On 3 November during an interview with Dalmacija News, Rozga presented her new single titled "Samo se ljubit' isplati" and announced a music video. The song was intended to remind listeners to her musical style during the time she served as the lead singer of Magazin. On 11 November, an accompanying music video for the song premiered on the singer's official YouTube channel. On 14 November, Minut Srca Mog was made available on both YouTube and other streaming platforms. That same day, the singer held its promotion at the Esplanade Zagreb Hotel, accompanied by close relatives, collaborators and friends where she performed some of the album's songs. On 20 November 2022, she appeared at the final evening of the Croatian talent show Zvijezde pjevaju where she performed "Samo se ljubit' isplati" live. On 25 January 2023, Rozga appeared together with Matić at the 2023 MAC Music Awards where they performed "Ti i Ja" live together. In January 2023, Rozga appeared at the awards show Cesarica where she performed "Samo se ljubit' isplati" live. On 24 March 2023, she appeared at the media award ceremony 29. Večernjakovoj ruži at the Croatian National Theater in Zagreb, where she performed "Oprosti Mala". On 26 June 2023, Rozga gave a performance of "Idi Ti" at the Melodije Hrvatskog Jadrana 2023. The song was well-received by her fans, received a Cesarica Award for Hit of August and peaked at number 15 on the Croatian HR Top 40.

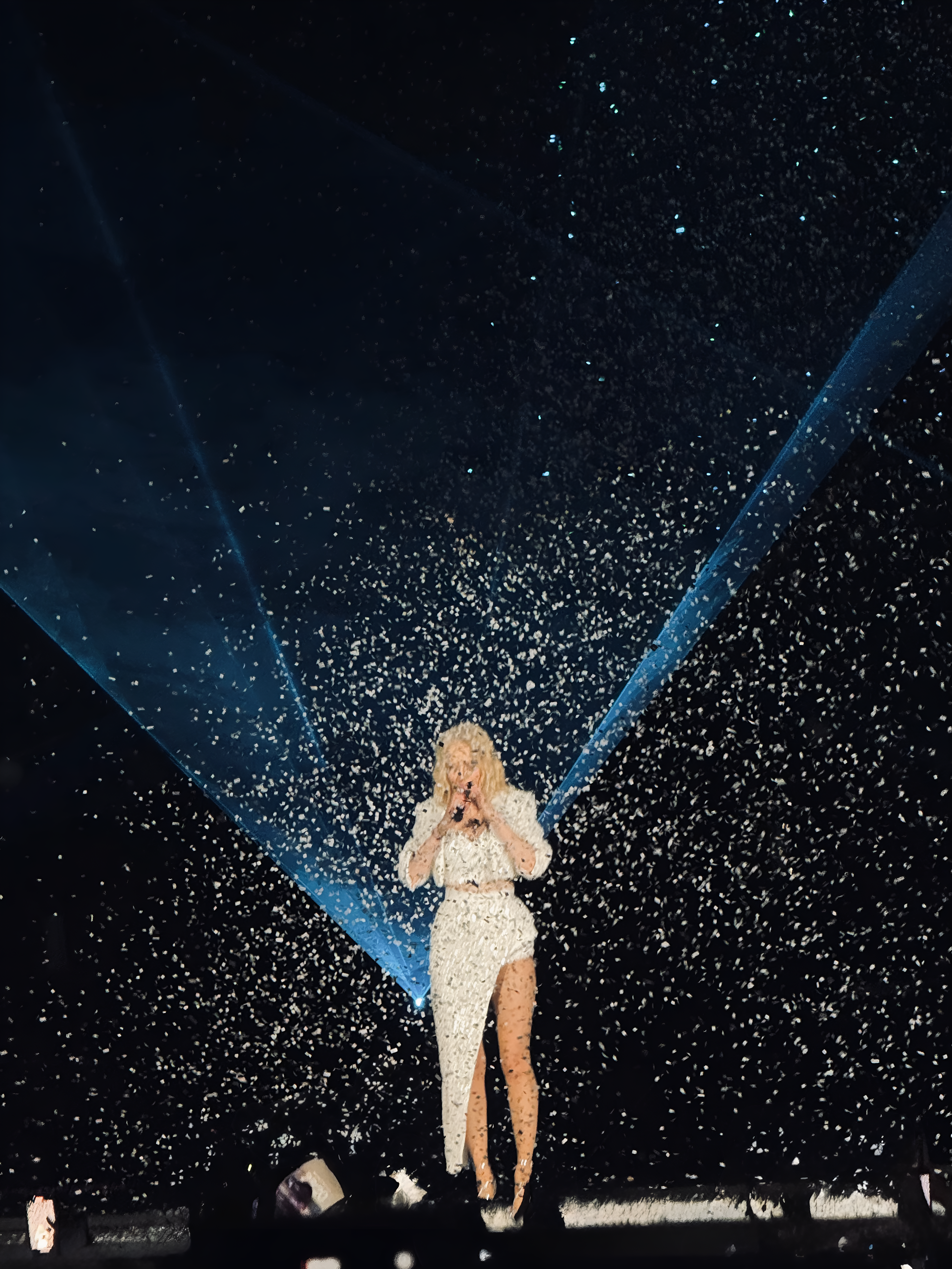
Rozga performing "Moje proljece" during the Minut Srca Mog Tour in Sarajevo.

On 30 October, she covered her own "Put putujem", "Oprosti mi pape" by Dragojević accompanied by Grašo on guitar. She caught media attention for being in the company of Serbian actor Goran Bogdan. On 5 December, Rozga appeared at Aleksandra Prijović's concert in Zagreb where she performed several of her own songs.

=== 2024-2026: new songs and performances, second acoustic studio album Zlatni dječače ===
On 2 March 2024, Rozga gave an interview for Croatian female magazine Gloria where she spoke about the early steps in her career and how she needed to learn to say "no" and to take rests in order to advance. On 22 March, Rozga released the single "Od čega sam ja", written by Ivan Huljić while arranged by him and Leo Škaro and Darko Dimitrov. A music video for the song premiered on the same day, directed by Miloš Šarović. Lyrically, the song discusses both the strengths and the weakness of a wounded woman who seems to be amazed at the fact that she can overcome the obstacles on her path. The song debuted at number 9 on the HR Top 40 singles chart. On 23 April 2024, Rozga appeared on the 30th anniversary of Gloria where she gave a performance. On 24 June 2024, Rozga premiered the song "Lavica" on the Melodije Hrvatskog Jadrana Festival donned in a black dress and presenting a new hairstyle. The song was written by the Huljić duo and received positive feedback from the singer's audience. A music video for the song directed by Franjo Macković was released on 24 July 2024. The singer briefly teased a behind-the-scenes snippet on Instagram on 4 July 2024. The clip features her singing the song in a room dressed all in red and accompanied by a love interest. During an interview, Rozga expressed her wishes to have the song surpass her previous biggest hit "Bižuterija", which was also the reaction of her fans according to some media outlets. It won the Cesarica Award for Hit of August in 2024.

On 30 August 2024, Rozga appeared on the sixth edition of the "Trag u beskraju" concert held in commemoration of Oliver Dragojević's death. She donned a black dress inspired by a Victoria Beckham design. For the event, Rozga performed two songs; "Navika" together with Petar Grašo and "Našoj ljubavi je kraj". On 18 September 2024, Rozga appeared on Bosnian show Klix Studio where she gave an interview promoting "Lavica" and her show in November while also discussing other aspects of her private life and career. She also shared that her rivalry with Severina is media-propagated and that she respects her work and different approach to it. During the same interview, she voiced her support for up and coming Bosnian singer Adi Šoše. On 11 October 2024, she appeared on the show Konačno petak where she gave an interview and performed "Lavica" and "Idi ti".

On 29 November 2024, Rozga appeared on the Serbian show Balkanskom ulicom where she sat for an hour-long interview with Vesna Dedić, answered questions by the audience and performed her songs "Lavica", "Ne tiče me se" and "Solo igračica". During the interview, she shared the view that she learnt about order and discipline in her meticulous work due to the "Russian school" approach in her ballet classes; however, she also shared how her Russian teachers were using physical violence to teach their students the necessary dance moves. Rozga also shared how her mother interfered in her career path as she was worried how she would earn her pension when retired; she was worried how her daughter would survive as a ballet dancer so she went ahead and changed her direction. In December 2024, Rozga held five consecutive of seven sold out concerts in Sava Centar in Belgrade, becoming the first and only person to do so. Other two concerts, scheduled for 20 and 21 December 2024, were postponed to 16 and 17 January 2025 due school stabbing in Zagreb.

On 30 January 2025, Rozga gave a concert at the Cesarica 2025 Awards. On 14 May 2025, Rozga appeared on Dr. Milojević's second season, eleventh episode podcast. In it, she discussed her music influences and cited Celine Dion, Dua Lipa, Zdravko Čolić, P!nk and Lady Gaga as her music inspirations. She shared the trick of not sleeping on her back in order to avoid acid reflux which could cause damage to her vocal chords. She also praised Italian singers and their performances at San Remo. On 30 June 2025, Rozga gave an exclusive performance of her song "Začarani krug" at the third Melodije Jadrana Festival held at the Galerije Meštrović park. The song was written by the duo Vjekoslava and Tonči Huljić and arranged by Leo Škaro. She donned a turquoise dress for the performance. On 29 July 2025, Rozga gave a concert at the Antique theater in Ohrid. On 27 October 2025, Rozga released a cover version of the song "Znam da ova ljubav ima sto života" by Dalmatian singer Gibonni followed by "Ti i ja smo južnjaci" originally performed by Zdravko Čolić on 26 November 2025.

On 6 December 2025, Rozga released a cover of the Christmas song "Božić je" arranged by Leo Škaro. A Christmas-themed music video directed by Pave Elez shows Rozga dressed in red with golden rings and a golden necklace, singing by the piano, decorating a Christmas tree accompanied by an elderly man and a young girl. On 19 December 2025, Rozga performed at the Winter Adventure at Trogir at the Ivan Pavel II. Before her performance in Zaboka, Rozga came down with the flu which she shared on Instagram and thanked her fans for supporting her make it through despite the illness. N.M., a writer of Dalmatinski portal opined that the performance further cemented her status as a "queen of estrada" and a lioness. Rozga is expected to perform in Sarajevo for New Year's Eve 2026 and gave a press conference together with city mayor Samir Avdić, Sarajevo Philharmonic Orchestra principal Vedran Tuce and technical organizer Nedim Srnja. During an interview, Rozga briefly touched upon the idea that she is planning to record a second acoustic studio album which would feature songs like Magazin's "Kako sam te voljela", her own "Slatko, ljuto, kiselo" and others. This would be in celebration of her thirty years of music career. It was revealed during an interview on 28 December 2025 that the album would be titled Zlatni dječače. Rozga also shared her plans to have another regional tour in 2027. During another interview on 2 January 2026, Rozga revealed she had plans to invite other featured artists on her songs.

On 19 December 2025, Rozga appeared on the ninth episode of the Bosnian TV show Pravo vrijeme by Hayat TV, where she was guest together with Serbian singer Dženan Lončarević. In it, she promoted her forthcoming New Year performance in Sarajevo. The concert was attended by 64.000 people. In addition to her usual set list, it included a cover of Kemal Monteno's "Sarajevo, ljubavi moja".

On 28 December 2025, Rozga took her social media to sing an acoustic version of her song "Ne tiče me se" in front of her Christmas tree accompanied by Arab guitarist Sara Al Hamad. She appeared dressed in black "dolčevita" and a yellow-black square skirt by home brand Klisab. Her concert was in the German city of Düsseldorf on 31 January 2026. On 3 March, she posted a video of celebration titled "30" where she sang "Aha" accompanied by her guitarist Pero. In the midst of wide media coverage on her forthcoming purported wedding with Huljić, she caught widespread media attention by posting a picture in front of the Hollywood sign in the US on 24 March 2026. On 25 March she caught further media attention by singing "Ljube se dobri, loši, zli" with her colleague Roka Blažević and announcing her concerts in Chicago and New York. On 23 April 2026, she gave an interview to RTL announcing her concert at the 2026 MHJ and sharing how she will present a new song which she still had to work on with the Huljić duo. On 24 April 2026, Rozga re-released her song "Bižuterija" along with a music video directed by Yassen Grigorov and supported by Nestlé Familia HIT by Froneri. The new version of the song was produced by Domazet.

On 16 May 2026, she gave an interview to Bulgarian COOLt where she discussed her career beginnings and her hit "Bižuterija". On 19 May 2026, she received an award for her contribution to music in 30 years of her career. On 29 June, Rozga premiered the song "Ljubi me" at the Melodije Hrvatskog Jadrana.

== Personal life ==
=== Love life ===
Little is known about Rozga's private life and her love relationships. She has frequently reported during interviews that she prefers to keep her private life secret and focus more on her music.

Rozga's most public relationship was with Stjepan Hauser, the cellist of the Croatian band 2Cellos. They met in 2015 during a concert they gave in Ljubljana where they performed an acoustic version of "Minut srca tvog". They got engaged the following year. In 2017, the relationship reportedly ended after two years. Around the time of the breakup media frequently reported how the song "Moje proljece" which lyrically revolves around betrayal and treason was dedicated to Hauser.

In August 2024, Rozga revealed to the press that she was in a relationship. In January 2025, Serbian Kurir papparazzied the two holding hands with each other in Budapest, Hungary and released the rumor they were in a relationship. The article published in the newspaper speculated how the two were together since collaborating on the song "Od čega sam ja" and later on her December and January Sava Centar concerts. In July 2025, she revealed that she was in a relationship with Ivan Huljić, who is the son of Tonči Huljić. She stated she was in love "for a hundred years" and revealed how the two travelled to the Island of Krk. She also briefly touched upon a forthcoming wedding between the two, but denied media allegations they would have two weddings. She revealed her relationship to Montenegrin journalist Božo Dobrica a year after she had mentioned her relationship status and said how a ring is not something she needs. Despite the fact they revealed their relationship to the public, the two were barely seen in public together. On 21 January 2026, Dnevno.hr reported seeing them at the Fiumicino Airport in Rome, Italy, wearing casual and according outfits. On 25 January 2026 a Kurir article cast doubt on the veracity of their relationship as Jelena does not follow Huljić on Instagram.

Rozga has shared during interview how her biggest wish is to become a mother. She also shared how she is open to the idea of adopting as she has friends and acquaintances who are adopted. She revealed to Ognjen Amidžić in 2015 how she wishes her child to be female who would be called Lucija, nicknamed Luce. She was also open to the option of having a son who would be called Toni. During another interview, she shared how she prefers men who have lighter eyes, like blue.

=== Health issues ===
Since 2006, Rozga was diagnosed with hyperthyroidism which caused her skin problems, excessive fatigue and weight loss. Rozga receives hormone therapy on a daily basis for her condition and needs monthly checks for the state of her gland. During an interview, she revealed how she thinks she is guilty for the disease herself by taking too many tasks at once. In 2018, Rozga was diagnosed with tachycardia for which she receives therapy with beta blockers. In 2020, Rozga reported a stalker to the police, suing him for following her from August 2019 until September 2020. Rozga has repeatedly revealed during interviews that she never drinks alcohol and protects her skin by not exposing it to sun.

On 7 June 2024, Rozga found out in a video interview with Ivan Blažinović from the Cesarica award show that she belongs to the 4% of the world population with Introverted, iNtuitive, Feeling, Judging (INFJ) personality type, characterized by introversion, priority-setting, problem-solving, being an example to others, hard-workingness, empathy and big dreamers. She shared during the same video that she is surprised to see that many people do not even greet her on the street.

Rozga shared how Huljić and her mother always advise her and Grašo to decrease the workload and give less concerts.

=== Leisure ===
Rozga revealed that she prefers having slow mornings during which she lets her creative process take place; as opposed to her earlier routine of taking her phone first in the morning. Her favorite foods include soups and the regional Balkan delicacy ajvar. She also likes eating sarma, but does not like eating prosciutto. In her free time, she likes sleeping, sitting, watching movies and TV series. Rozga has shared that one of her favorite TV show is Sex and the City. She also revealed that she enjoys spending time in silence, listening to music from the 1980s on TV channels like MTV and VH1 and thinking of the directions she would like to take her music career. She credits her high energy to her mother, who she describes as very active even in the more elderly phase. During interviews, Rozga continuously cites her parents' support as crucial to her success. Rozga had a dog named Ringo as a pet; on 23 September 2025, she shared on her social media platforms that it passed away.

Rozga currently lives in Croatia's capital Zagreb together with her niece Lea, a working student in her twenties. According to Rozga, the two have an intimate relationship where they have no secrets with each other and speak about all topics. Apart from her, she also has a nephew Noa, who is an avid football fan and aspires to become a Dinamo Zagreb player. Jelena Rozga likes travelling in Europe and has cited Rome as her favorite tourist destination to visit.

=== Faith ===
Although she has not publicly spoken about her faith, Rozga does the sign of the cross before her public performances and was seen with her two hands together praying. Two of her songs, "Gospe moja" and "Nazaret" are dedicated to the figures of Mother Mary and Jesus Christ. She also shared how she believes in numerology and considers seven to be her lucky number and a sign of how to proceed forward.

=== Public friendships ===
Rozga is affiliated to Serbian singer Željko Joksimović and his wife Jovana Joksimović. She attended the former's concert with the latter in Split on 23 August 2024.

=== Violent behavior ===
Nevertheless, during other interviews, Rozga has shared how she has been violent towards males in her class and how she always used to fight with them. In one interview, she revealed how her sister and she were aggressive to each other when she was 17, to the point that once she lost a patch of hair after she took her sister's clothes, making Rozga a partaker in domestic violence. In return, her sister was covered in bruises. Additionally, during some of her live performances, Rozga has demonstrated aggressive behavior towards her male colleagues. This included Sergej Četković who she aggressively told off for touching her microphone during the "Prsten na sto" performance.

While being a guest on Ami G's show in January 2022, Rozga retorted to Ognjen's question whether everything on her was natural by asking him "why is your hand shaking?". During the Balkanskom ulicom episode, Rozga shared how she would not just watch someone disenfranchise her but that she would violently fight for herself if someone pushes her. During her live performances, Rozga always separates her audience using heteronormative language into males and females and often attributes negative characteristics to males. During her Christmas live concert on 25 December 2020, she was abrupt and arrogant towards the end when musicians Karlo Dotur and Milan Terze proclaimed the show to be over.

Rozga has also shared other aspects of her anti-social behavior and they include cursing when angry and smoking cigarettes when nervous. She said she "hates" herself whenever she lights a cigarette up, but that she could not resist not smoking along with her morning coffee. She also shared how she often argues with Tonči Huljić regarding songs. "Bižuterija" was one of the songs that arose as the fruit of one of those heated arguments.

=== Collaboration with Severina ===
Jelena Rozga and Severina met around the time the latter released "Djevojka sa sela" (1998). They appeared together at each other's concerts, in 2009 and 2011. Severina praised Rozga's charisma and singing talent. She called to promote Rozga's concert at the Spalladium Arena and praised her work from her first solo song, "Aha" through her growth, to the project Bižuterija being promoted, saying how "it is immediately noticeable when one has talent". She went on wishing her a lot of success after the concert.

After both appeared on each other's concerts, their relationships became cold and rumors arose in media that the two had an argument. There was constant media reporting that the two were music scene rivals and their fans competed about which one of the two achieved higher success. Additionally, some of the songs they released around the same time revolved around the same title. Rozga was recorded as saying to Telegraf in 2013, "I really do not think of her. I do not have time because I am busy with things that totally grasp my attention. I have my own path, my own songs and audience. I am not interested in Severina."

On 21 December 2021, Rozga was asked during an interview how her relationship to Severina was, to which she replied "I am in good terms to all of my colleagues". When journalists attempted to create rivalry between their respective duets with Saša Matić, Rozga dismissed them by replying that "both songs are great". On 18 September 2024, Rozga revealed how the rivalry between her and Vučković was all "pumped up" by media and denied claims the two dislike each other. She elaborated how everyone of her colleagues does their job in their own way and how she avoids interfering in it. In 2024, she liked Severina's Instagram post, which supported European Union citizens' petition for female abortion law. This was interpreted as Rozga's attempt at finding truce. On 8 April 2025, TV Dalmacija asked passersby in Split whether Rozga or Severina was their favorite singer. Most interviewees chose the latter.

== Activism ==
During an interview for T-portal in January 2017, amidst anti-abortion discussions in Croatia, Rozga supported women's rights to abort, declaring it a personal choice. During the same interview, she also voiced her support for gender equality and the LGBTQ community. In 2013, Rozga took part in Goran Bregović's concert in Sarajevo titled Saso Mange at which funds were raised for musical education of members of the Roma minority. In April 2017, she participated in a roundtable event in Zagreb titled Gelem, Gelem - World4Them during which the results of the project aimed at integrating the Roma minority in the educational system and protecting their human rights were shared. On 21 March 2016, as part of a concert dedicated to World Down Syndrome Day, she participated at the concert held in Zagreb.

During her career, Rozga collaborated with several Croatian and international fashion and cosmetic brands. From 2015, she became an ambassador for the French cosmetic brand Garnier in 9 countries in Eastern Europe. That same year, together with Bosnian football player Emir Spahić, she collaborated with credit deal of Sberbanke BH. She has also served as an advertiser for the Italian fashion brand Liu Jo the Croatian fashion brand ELFS and the car brand SEAT Hrvatska. In 2020, Rozga also collaborated with Max Factor in Croatia, Slovenia and Bosnia and Herzegovina. In April 2024, Rozga collaborated with doctor Nikola Milojević in the Milojević Polyclinic, where she promoted their face and body treatment practices. In September 2025, Rozga became the protective face of VZG Laboratory's dermato-cosmetic products under the campaign "Lijepo se vidi" (English: "The beautiful can be seen"). The advertisement appeared in Serbia, Montenegro and Croatia. In April 2026, Rozga became the protective face of the diamond industry company Zaks under the campaign "Uvijek svoja. Zauvijek Zaks" (English: "Always your own. Forever Zaks"), appearing in a short commercial.

During her interviews, Rozga has often shared her feminist views and voiced the opinion that women should support each other. In March, she supported the feminist march organized on 8 March 2024 in Croatia. On 1 April 2024, during one of her concerns she condemned the perpetrators in a video which surfaced online of a teenage girl being bullied. On 2 October 2024, Rozga appeared on the Pinkypromiss conference as an ambassador for breast cancer.

When asked what she thinks of red-wing party's forbidding of Bajaga i Instruktori's concert in the two Croatian towns of Sisak and Solin by Serbian newspaper Blic on 25 July 2025, Rozga started sharing her opinion but was not allowed to say by a male representative. On 19 August 2025, during an interview with the same newspaper, Rozga expressed her disapproval of esthetic plastic surgery. She has also shared how she would forbid extremely negative comments that users leave on portals regarding artists.

Rozga has worked out in the gym under the leadership of her personal trainer Ante Burazi, thus supporting a healthy lifestyle. The two also developed a friendship around her songs.

== Artistry ==
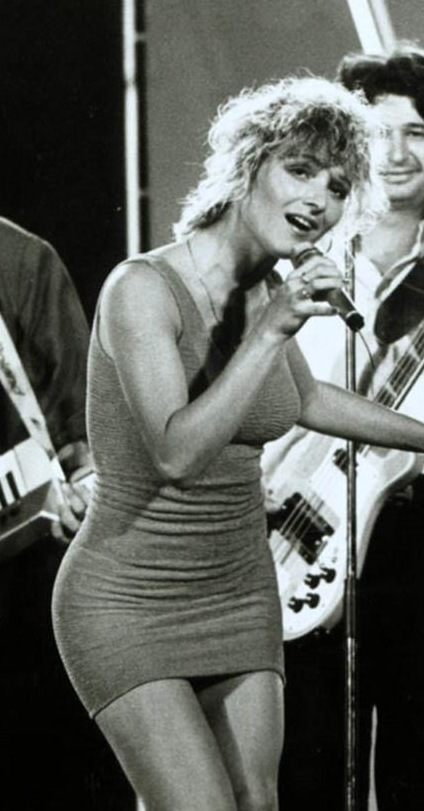
Ljiljana Nikolovska, Rozga's biggest music inspiration

Rozga's music is generally classified as pop. Her earlier music records were heavily influenced by and contained Mediterranean and traditional music elements. Her music projects from the 2010s onwards incorporate more traditional regional musical styles, such as folk and turbo-folk elements which can be further classified in a genre dubbed "Croatian neofolk". While her first two studio albums, Oprosti Mala and Bižuterija were more consistent genre-wise, Rozga's third studio album, Moderna žena, experimented with several musical genres, including mainstream music, electronic dance music (EDM), Dalmatian traditional music, pop balladry and rap. Rozga cited Magazin singer Ljiljana Nikolovska as her biggest musical inspiration and the main reason she decided to venture in the music industry. Rozga was credited for bringing back the popularity to the group Magazin to a level similar to the period when Nikolovska was the lead singer of the band. After Rozga's joining of the group, the number of sold-out arena concerts also increased. Since the launch of her solo career, Rozga is accompanied by an all-male band during live performances. This includes Pero on acoustic guitar, Donatello on bass guitar and two others on percussion and keyboard. Rozga's career is managed by Gordana Labović, who she has also cited as one of her closest friends.

In 2018, Rozga revealed her list of top 50 Yugoslav songs, which included artists like Jelena Tomašević, Kemal Monteno, Novi Fosili, Željko Samardžić, Đorđe Balašević, Colonia, Toni Cetinski, Crvena Jabuka, Oliver Mandić, Gibonni, Josipa Lisac, Maja Odžaklievska, Indexi, Goran Karan, Dorian Gray, Bijelo Dugme, Kiki & Piloti and Zana Nimani. Her favorite song is "Krivi ljudi" by Doris Dragović.

== Legacy ==
The lyrics of Rozga's song, which are frequently written by Vjekoslava Huljić, revolve around female experiences with love, betrayal, independence, heartbreak and female empowerement. The lyrics of her most famous song "Bižuterija", describe the experience of a dissatisfied woman who is left by her partner after having been treated as "bijouterie". The lyrics "žena, majka, kraljica" ("a woman, a mother, a queen") from the song "Bižuterija" became a catchphrase among the public on the Balkans, used to describe a powerful woman who can easily solve life problems. It also gained widespread use as a phrase of support and empowerment among women and as such, was used in merchandise.

In addition to her musical legacy, she has become renowned for her fashion style recognizable by mini-skirts and high platform heels which were coined "Rozgice". The singer describes her private fashion style as very different from her performance outfits as it consists primarily of jeans and shoes. Critics often compliment the singer's fashion styles, which they view as fitting with her slim figure that she managed to maintain throughout the years. She is also seen as a symbol of elegance and positive and lively energy. Rozga's music and live performances have inspired singer Lorena Bućan, who has also named her her favorite singer in Croatia. In May 2022, Rozga posted an Instagram video of the two singing Lorena's song "Tvoja i Gotovo". On 23 April 2026, Rozga made a guest appearance at up-and-rising music phenomenon Jakov Jozinović during his concert at the Sava Center in Belgrade where the two performed "Minut srca tvog" and "Dani su bez broja".

Prior to Andrea Šušnjara's leaving of the group Magazin, Rozga was the biggest supporter of her launching a solo career and had been urging her to do so in written and spoken interviews, adding that "going solo" requires a lot of work. Rozga has shared how she is completely selfless when it comes to the show. Her most important factor is to have each audience member enjoy to the fullest. She also shared how she believes that music transcends politics and that it has the power to erase borders between countries and unite people.

== Awards and nominations ==
During her solo career, Rozga has received numerous awards for both her songs and albums. In 2011, she received a Porin award in the category Hit of the Year for her song "Bižuterija". Until the early 2020s, she has received the Grand Prix award at the Split Festival five times. Additionally, all three of Rozga's albums have received a gold certification by the Croatian Phonographic Association.

List of awards and nominations of Jelena Rozga
Award	Year	Nominated work	Category	Result	Ref.
Porin	2011	"Bižuterija"	Hit of the Year	Won	
Porin	2012	"Dalmatinka" (feat. Connect (band))	Hit of the Year	Nominated	
Porin	2014	"Nirvana"	Hit of the Year	Nominated	
Porin	2012	Bižuterija	Best Pop Music Album	Nominated	
Porin	2017	Moderna žena	Best Pop Music Album	Nominated	
Dora	1996	"Aha"	N/A	2nd place (156 points)	
Dora	2006	"Ne zovi me Marija"	N/A	6th place (19 points)	
Dora	2007	"Nemam"	N/A	7th place (21 points)	
Grand prix - Split Music Festival	2008	"Gospe moja"	Most Played Song After a Year	Won	
Grand prix - Split Music Festival	2009	"Daj šta daš"	Most Played Song After a Year	Won	
Grand prix - Split Music Festival	2010	"Rodit ću ti 'ćer i sina"	Most Played Song After a Year	Won	
Grand prix - Split Music Festival	2012	"Razmažena"	Most Played Song After a Year	Won	
Grand prix - Split Music Festival	2011	"Razmažena"	"Zlatno jedro" - audience vote	Won	
Grand prix - Split Music Festival	2012	"Solo igračica"	"Srebrni galeb" - audience vote	2nd place	
Music Awards Ceremony	2019	"Uzmem koliko mi daš"	Pop Song by a Female Performer	Won	
Music Awards Ceremony	2020	"Moje proljeće"	Pop Song by a Female Performer	Nominated	
Music Awards Ceremony	2023	"Ti i Ja"	Best Collaboration	Won	
Music Awards Ceremony	2023	"Zar je ljubav spala na to"	Best Collaboration	Nominated	
Golden Ladybug of Popularity	2020	Jelena Rozga	Most Popular Regional Singer	Won	

== Discography ==
=== Studio albums ===
with Magazin

- Nebo boje moje ljubavi (1996)
- Da si ti ja (1998)
- Minus i plus (2000)
- S druge strane Mjeseca (2002)
- Paaa..? (2004)

Solo

- Oprosti mala (2006)
- Bižuterija (2011)
- Moderna žena (2016)

=== Compilation albums ===
- Best of Jelena Rozga (2011)
- Jelena Rozga (2017)
- Minut srca mog (2022)

== Filmography ==
Title	Year	Role	Notes	Ref.
Najveća pogreška Alberta Einsteina	2006	Girl with glasses	Supporting role	
The Lorax	2012	Audrey	Croatian dub	

== Tours ==
Headlining

- The Bižuterija Tour (2010–12)
- Minut Srca Mog Tour (2022–24)

Co-headlining

- Karlovačko live 2011. (with Bajaga i Instruktori)

== See also ==
- Music of Croatia
- Popular music in Croatia
- Popular music in Yugoslavia
