= Republika (Macedonian newspaper) =

Weekly newspaper

- Front page, 23 November 2012
- Type: weekly (2012-2017) online (since 2017)
- Publisher: Prva Republika Dooel
- Editor-in-chief: Biljana Babić
- Founded: 2012
- Political alignment: Right-wing
- Language: Macedonian
- Headquarters: Skopje
- Country: North Macedonia
- Website: republika.mk

The Republika (Macedonian: Република, pronounced [rɛpubɫika], lit. 'The Republic') is a news magazine based in Skopje, North Macedonia. Publishing began in 2012. In 2017, the print edition was shut down due to financial problems, but the publication has continued online.

According to research conducted by BIRN's Media Ownership Monitor (MOM), both the weekly newspaper and its associated online portal have, since their establishment, maintained a clear editorial alignment with the VMRO-DPMNE party and taken a critical stance towards its political opponents. MOM identifies them as part of the media network associated with the party during its time in power.

== Ownership ==
The publishing company Prva Republika DOO Skopje was established in 2012 and was initially wholly owned by Iresine Limited, an offshore company registered in Belize whose ownership was undisclosed. In 2016, ownership of Prva Republika was transferred to Macedonian businessman Done Donevski.

On 16 April 2018, the Hungarian-owned company Adinamik Media acquired a 51% stake in Prva Republika, while Donevski retained the remaining 49%. Adinamik Media was established in Skopje in 2017 by Hungarian citizen Agnes Adamik, a former senior executive at Hungary's public broadcaster. Investigative reporting by OCCRP has examined Adamik's media investments in North Macedonia in the context of the expansion of Hungarian media interests in the Balkans and their reported connections to political circles associated with Viktor Orban.
