= Bravo! (Croatian radio station) =

bravo!
Programming
- Language: Croatian

History
- First air date: 23 December 1997
- Former names: Narodni Radio (–2022)

Links
- Website: bravo.hr

bravo! is a Croatian radio station broadcast nationally.

Founded as Narodni radio, it was the most listened-to radio station in the country in 2014. As of 2011, it was one of three radio stations with national concessions, along with Otvoreni Radio and Croatian Catholic Radio.

Before 15 November 2022, the station played only Croatian music. On that day it rebranded to bravo! and it now plays foreign music too.

== Awards ==
- 2013 Porin Award as a "Friend of Croatian Music"

== See also ==
- List of radio stations in Croatia
