= Ivan Huljić =

Croatian pop songwriter and composer

- Born: 17 January 1988 (age 38); Split, SR Croatia, SFR Yugoslavia
- Education: University of Split
- Occupations: Songwriter; composer; musician; keyboard player; lawyer
- Years active: 2006–present
- Parents: Tonči Huljić (father); Vjekoslava Tolić (mother)
- Awards: Best Song (Split Festival)

Ivan Huljić (born 17 January 1988) is a Croatian composer, songwriter, guitarist, singer, producer and lawyer from the region of Dalmatia. He first emerged as a songwriter in 2006 with the song "Zadnja epizoda" (English: "Last Episode") for the famous pop band Magazin from Split. He also served as Magazin's keyboard player from 2006 to 2010. He has since written songs for numerous Croatian pop singers, including Danijela Martinović, Doris Dragović, Domenica, Damir Kedžo, Joško Čagalj Jole, Marino Jakobić, Petar Dragojević, Jelena Rozga and Lorena. In addition to lyrics, Ivan Huljić has also served as the composer and producer for several songs. In 2022, he served as the creative director for the Fusion World Music Festival held for the first time in Split. In 2025, he wrote Magazin's English-language entry "AaAaA" for Dora, the song competition to choose Croatia's 2025 Eurovision Song Contest entry.

Although reluctant to speak about his private life, in 2010, media connected Huljić to supermodel Ana Goreta. As of 2024, it was made known to the public that he is in a relationship with singer Jelena Rozga. Huljić has received numerous awards for his music and songwriting work, including Best Song at the Split Festival for "Mi protiv nas" (English: "We Against Us"). Huljić is also the procurer of Tonika Records, a record label established in 2005.

== Early years ==
Ivan Huljić was born on 17 January 1988 in Split, Croatia, to father Tonči Huljić, a musician, producer and composer and Vjekoslava Huljić, a lyricist, songwriter and writer. He has an older sister, pop singer and performer Hana Huljić. Huljić first started playing keyboards, when he was 9 years old. He finished high school at the private gymnasium Kraljica Jelena (English: "Queen Jelena") where he finalized all exams related to music school. Already in high school, Huljić was convinced to serve as the keyboard player of Magazin by his father, although he was initially reluctant to take on such a role. Huljić finished law studies at the University of Splitbut never worked in his field, although he also shared how he has his knowledge on hold.

The fable Čampro his mother wrote where he and his sister were the main characters was put on stage and performed in 1996 at the Split Puppet Theatre.

== Career ==
=== 2006–2010: Keyboardist and songwriting for Magazin ===
He first played keyboards for the song "Piši mi" (English: "Write me") in 2008 when he joined the popular Dalmatian band Magazin at the restaurant Kokolo. He has since played in the group for several years. Huljić first emerged as a songwriter in 2006 when he wrote the song "Zadnja epizoda" for the band. He continued writing the lyrics and music of several of the band's songs while Ivana Kovač served as the main singer. In addition to that, since 2008, he also served as the keyboard player for the band.

On 18 July 2010, Huljić gave an interview with Story.hr in which he discussed his studies at the Law University and his career path in music, specifically his work on Ja vjerujem (English: I Believe), the album by Dalmatian pop singer Doris Dragović. He also described himself as a shy, self-deprecating and calm person. That year, he wrote the music for the song "Judi od cakla" (English: "People of glass") performed by Petar Dragojević for the 2010 Split Music Festival. He also shared how he only takes small pieces of other people's advice in order to remain authentic. He shared how being in love with another girl made him more creative. He shared the following opinion on other people, "One should not trust people too much and that is why I will never impose myself and open up too much to people who I barely know. I was always more one who observes, because you can conclude more about a person based on the first meetup."

In 2011, Huljić was credited as one of the keyboardists for the album Bižuterija by Jelena Rozga.

=== 2015–2019: songwriting, composing and creative director debut ===
In 2015, Huljić together with Vjekoslava, served as the producer and songwriter of several songs on Doris Dragović's album Ja vjerujem, including "Ni riči" (English: "Not a Single Word") , "Svit ne more znat" (English: "People Do Not Need to Know"), "Zvir" ("Beast"). In 2018, Huljić received the award for Best Song at the Split Festival for the song "Mi protiv nas" ("We Against Us") for which he served as the main songwriter and was performed by Domenica and Damir Kedžo. The song is a fast-paced ballad with emotional lyrics. On 12 August 2019, Huljić served as the musician and songwriter to "Brod za nabolje" ("Boat for the Better") by Doris Dragović. He shared how with the song, he also started gaining confidence as a songwriter as opposed to being only a music-writer before that. On 31 January 2019, he wrote the music to Danijela Martinović's "Kao prekjučer" ("Like the Day Before Yesterday"), a song about nostalgia for times gone by.

On 6 March 2020, he was guest on the HRT TV show Kod nas doma broadcast through Hrvatska radiotelevizija together with Domenica and Damir to discuss their dynamics and how they created their duet.

=== 2020–2023: songwriting, composing and creative director debut ===
In 2021, Huljić wrote the music to "Sna'ću se ja" ("I Will Find My Way") by Doris Dragović. On 1 October 2021, Huljić appeared as a guest on the show Kod nas doma on Hrvatska radiotelevizija together with songwriter Neno Ninčević and Ivana Kovač and later with fashion designer Zoran Aragović. Huljić appeared to be very bothered by Ninčević's presence and on one occasion when he said that Huljić could be good-looking even if he undressed "naked to his male member" (Croatian:"kit" = vulgar expletive for penis), he just disgustingly looked away from the camera. In addition to that, Huljić also briefly discussed his writing process and his family dynamics, while Kovač praised his work ethic.

In the summer of 2022, Huljić served as the creative director of the World Music Fusion Festival in Split which marked his first musical project on such a scale. He invented the festival's concept which featured performances by international as well as Croatian artists in November during the pandemic although the idea had existed even earlier. He commented that with the festival, he wanted to fight against the 2022 economic crisis in Europe, create something new and good for the community. After the success of the show, Huljić also announced his plans to work on a 3-day festival the following year.

In the summer of 2022, he wrote the music and lyrics for the song "Shakespeare" by Joško Čagalj Jole which was released on 7 June 2022. He also wrote the music and collaborated on the lyrics with Vjekoslava of the song "Sve smo mogli imat" by Doris Dragović released on 23 June 2022. In March 2023, Huljić wrote the song "Igračka" ("Toy"), which was recorded by Antonia Dora and presented at the Zagreb Festival. For the song, Huljić, who first wrote the music and then the lyrics, drew inspiration for the solo from Tina Turner's "What's Love Got to Do with It" (1984). On 7 July 2023, Huljić wrote the music and lyrics for the summer song "Kad bi" ("If Only") by group CAMBI in collaboration with producer Hrvoje Domazet. The song had its premiere at the 2023 Melodije Jadrana Festival. On 11 November 2023, Huljić performed "Pasta Italiana" together with musician Vojko V at the Dom Sportova. This marked his first public performance as a singer.

=== 2024–2025: New songs ===
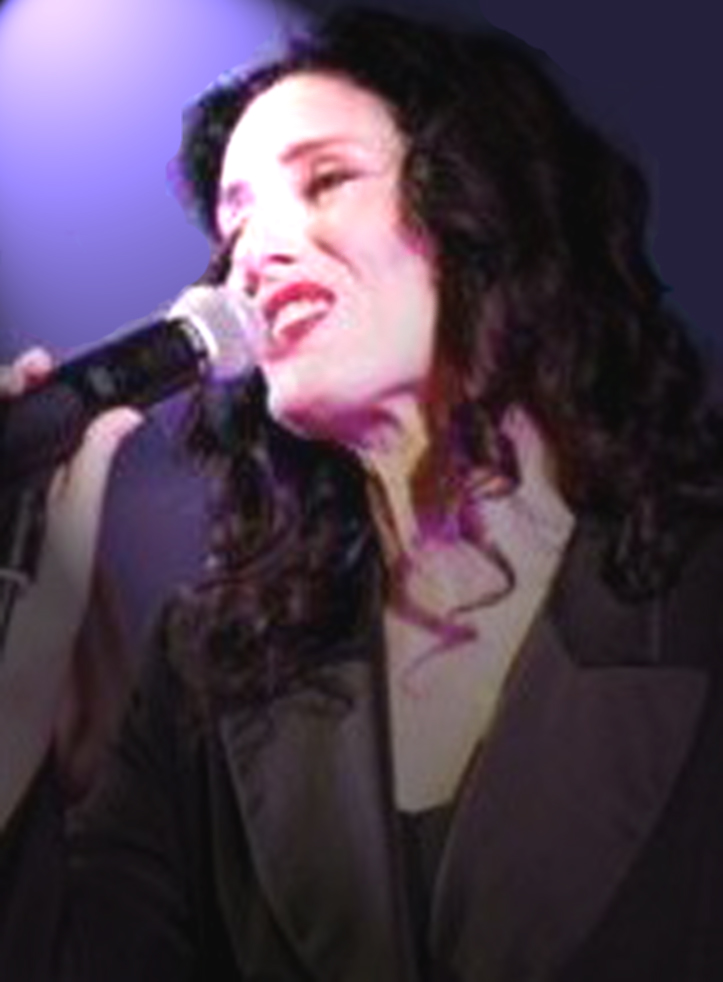
Doris Dragović (pictured), a frequent collaborator of Ivan, referred to him as her "own son"

In 2024, several songs written and arranged by Huljić see the light of day. The song "Od Čega Sam Ja" (English: What Am I of) written for Rozga was released on 21 March 2024. Huljić worked independently on the music and lyrics while he collaborated with Leo Škaro and Darko Dimitrov on the arrangement. Croatian music critic Anđelo Jurkas of Mixer rated the song 7.5/10 and praised it as Huljić's moment of coming out of the "creative shadow" and taking over the lead from his father and mother. (Note: Croatian: "Nova generacija Huljića autorski preuzima očevu i majčinu palicu i više nego zaslužen izlazi iz kreativne sjene.") On 11 April 2024, Marino Jakobikj released "Lučija" as his debut single; both the lyrics and the music are written independently by Ivan Huljić, while the arrangement was finalized by Huljić in collaboration with Hrvoje Domazet. On 28 June 2024, Marino performed "Geni ljubavi" ("Genes of Love") at the 2024 Melodije Jadrana Festival, written and produced by Huljić, while arranged in collaboration with producer Hrvoje Domazet. On 26 November 2024, he appeared on HRT1 TV Show Kod nas doma together with Marino Jakobić to promote his new music material. On 14 December 2024, Magazin presented the Eurovision-song "AaAaA" which was written by both Tonci and Ivan Huljić. Its lyrics are love and hope-related and make mention of Judas Iscariot, the apostle who betrayed Jesus Christ. Speaking about its conception, Tonči Huljić elaborated how it was meant to be a testament that fear must never dominate love and that loving the people around one is always the way forward in overcoming crippling fear. The song was performed at the 2025 Dora competition in February 2025, although it did not classify to be Croatia's entry song, ending third in total.

In 2025, Huljić worked on the music for the song "Kad zastor mi padne" (English: When my curtain falls) by Doris Dragović which was performed for the first time at the 2025 Melodije Jadrana at the Galery Meštrović. He also worked on the entire album which contained the song, which included songs "Neka se priča nastavi" ("Let the Story Continue"), "Društvo kajanja" ("Company of Regret") and "Cvit soli" ("A Flower of Salt") on which he served as a songwriter as well. Based on their very intimate emotional bond, Dragović referred to him during an interview as her own son. On 29 June 2025, Huljić wrote the lyrics and music and co-produced Marino's "Evanđelje po tebi" ("Gospel by You"). On 6 May 2025, Dragović released the song "Sluge tune" ("Servants of Sorrow"), completely written by Huljic, with Domazet helping on the arrangement. On 16 May 2025, the song "Eternity" featuring Philippine singer Marcelito Pomoy was released with lyrics written by Ivan. On 25 September 2025, Marino released the song "Na tebe slab" ("Weak on You") which was written, arranged and composed by Huljić.

== Creative process ==
In 2022, Ivan Huljić stated during an interview, that he finds it important to work on several fronts in the music-making process simultaneously, including creative, lyrical and musical direction, to "break the monotony". He has revealed that the biggest musical inspiration comes when he performs on the guitar or the piano. He has also worked on librettos and lyrics for musicals together with Vjekoslava Huljić, which have not managed to come to fruition due to restrictions and delays caused by the COVID-19 pandemic. In 2022, Huljić stated that he prefers to refrain from giving interviews and only do it a few times long term. He also shared how he thinks he wouldn't want to start singing as his father and sister are already doing that. He grew up listening to the Beatles, Queen, Bob Dylan, and was inspired by English author Noel Gallagher.

When asked whether he considers music to be craft or art, he replied "There is something of one and the other. There are some rules of the craft which can be broken, that is even necessary, although music is definitely art. If you take it as craft, it cannot survive without a dose of art and if you take it as art, it remains even without the craft."

== Private life ==
Huljić is friends with Croatian singer-songwriter Matija Cvek with whom he often celebrates his birthday. He is also friends with pop music producer Hrvoje Domazet. He revealed during an interview that he considers his friends to be the biggest success of his life.

Slobodna Dalmacija connected him to Best Model Media Dalmacija, Ana Goreta in 2010, reporting that they were filmed in each other's embrace. She was reported as saying to the journalist that Huljić proposed to take her home after she told him she wanted to sleep. In 2013, media connected him for the first time with Jelena Rozga after he went to play the keyboard to their apartment. The two denied it when it first happened.

In October 2021, he appeared at the promotion of Zlatan Stipišić Gibonni's album U po'ure in Zagreb, where he posed together with colleagues. In early February 2022, he made an appearance at the red carpet of the Cesarica music awards together with his family dressed in a black coat. He posed for the camera in the embrace of his father Tonči. On 17 February 2022, Huljić appeared at the Cathedral of Saint Domnius in Split for his sister's wedding to Petar Grašo accompanied by her godmother Domenica Žuvela. He was dressed in a dark red suit. On 23 July 2024, he appeared on Matija Cvek's wedding with Miriam Cikron at Basilica of Saint Anthony of Padua, Zagreb at Črnomerec.

=== Relationsip to Rozga ===
In August 2024, Rozga revealed to the press that she was in a relationship with Ivan Huljić. Rozga revealed how the rumours were started by her neighbours in 2024. Rumors about the two being together appeared in 2009, after Rozga appeared with him and her friends at a concert by Tony Cetinski and later in 2010, after Huljić was seen coming out of her apartment. In the first occasion, Rozga was defensively denying the piece of news, calling him only a year-long colleague and friend. She said: "Someone took a picture of us. I really think that piece of news does not deserve so much attention. I also think I have the right to friends, that I drink coffee with whomever I want, without jt being a piece of news." In the second occasion, she also denied, saying how they were only friends and how she had the right to drink coffee whoever she wants with. In January 2025, Serbian Kurir papparazzied the two holding hands with each other in Budapest, Hungary and released the rumor they were in a relationship. The article published in the newspaper speculated how the two were together since collaborating on the song "Od čega sam ja" and later on her December and January Sava Centar concerts. In July 2025, Rozga stated again how she was in love "for a hundred years" with him, only had to end the relationship due to changing circumstances. She revealed how the two travelled to the Island of Krk on holiday. She also briefly touched upon a forthcoming wedding between the two, but denied media allegations they would have two weddings. She revealed her relationship to Montenegrin journalist Božo Dobrica a year after she had mentioned her relationship status and said how a ring is not something she needs. Despite the fact they revealed their relationship to the public, the two were barely seen in public together. On 21 January 2026, Dnevno.hr reported seeing them at the Fiumicino Airport in Rome, Italy, wearing casual and according outfits.

On 25 January 2026 a Kurir article cast doubt on the veracity of their relationship as Jelena does not follow Huljić on Instagram.

== Discography ==
The full discography of writing or composing credits is taken from Ivan Huljić's profile on the Croatian Copyright Collection Society for the Music Sector.

- "Zadnja epizoda" (2007)
- "Ni riči" (2008)
- "O meni će pričat potiho" (2008)
- "Svit ne more znat" (2008)
- "Zvir" (2008)
- "Ako dođem pameti" (2011)
- "Akužaj" (2011)
- "Ankoran" (2011)
- "Imberlan (instrumental)" (2011)
- "Juda" (2011)
- "Love song" (2011)
- "Parti vrime (instrumental)" (2011)
- "Samo jubav ostaje" (2011)
- "Tramuntana" (2011)
- "A tebe nima" (2012)
- "Bolje odat nego stat" (2012)
- "Kekereke (Čućaj mala)" (2012)
- "Ja san rojen da mi bude lipo" (2012)
- "Lara ekstaza" (2012)
- "Lara exotic" (2012)
- "Lara odlazak" (2012)
- "Lara oluja" (2012)
- "Lara orient" (2012)
- "Providenca (najava)" (2012)
- "Ajvar" (2013)
- "Day light" (2013)
- "Dešina tema" (2013)
- "Gasi se ljubav (glas)" (2013)
- "Judita (glas)" (2013)
- "Konavle (glas)" (2013)
- "Maro" (2013)
- "Nad Srđem (glas)" (2013)
- "Osjećaj ljubavi (glas)" (2013)
- "Stradun (glas)" (2013)
- "Tužna ljubavna (glas)" (2013)
- "Uvertira (glas)" (2013)
- "Zora dubrovačka (glas)" (2013)
- "Suton (klavir)" (2014)
- "Doza rizika (ljubakanje)" (2015)
- "Jubavi rič" (2015)
- "Čemu nervoza" (2016)
- "Majina tema" (2016)
- "Natašina tema" (2016)
- "Ne znan za se" (2016)
- "Nikolina tema" (2016)
- "Nisam papak – sjetna" (2016)
- "Ružina tema" (2016)
- "Tema Prava žena" (2016)
- "Kad sam s tobom" (2017)
- "Mi protiv nas" (2017)
- "Bilo naroda" (2018)
- "Brod za nabolje" (2018)
- "Kao prekjučer" (2018)
- "Pišem na tebe" (2018)
- "Tihi ocean" (2018)
- "Tower of Babylon" (2018)
- "Drowning" (2019)
- "Ljubi majku zemlju" (2020)
- "Medenjak" (2020)
- "Shakespeare" (2020)
- "Sna'ću se ja" (2020)
- "Sve smo mogli imat" (2020)
- "Boje" (2021)
- "Gospođica" (2021)
- "Foot in mouth" (2022)
- "Izbor je tvoj" (2022)
- "Che Guevara i manistra u suvo"
- "Judi od cakla"
- "Kakvi san ja kralj – podloga"
- "Lara sanjarenje"
- "Lara sjetna"
- "Mana"
- "Najava zla"
