= Petar Grašo discography =

Croatian singer-songwriter

- Studio albums: 3
- Soundtrack albums: 1
- Compilation albums: 3
- Singles: 27
- Collaborative: 1

Croatian singer-songwriter Petar Grašo has released three studio albums, three compilation albums, one soundtrack album, one collaborative album and 27 singles.

== Albums ==
=== Studio albums ===
Title	Details	Peak chart positions
Title	Details	CRO
Mjesec iznad oblaka	Released: 1997; Formats: Cassette, CD, digital download, streaming; Label: Orfej, Tonika	(Note: Top of the Shops was launched in 2002 but a partial archive is only available from 2006 onwards.)
Utorak	Released: 1999; Formats: Cassette, CD, digital download, streaming; Label: Croatia Records, Tonika	(Note: Top of the Shops was launched in 2002 but a partial archive is only available from 2006 onwards.)
Šporke riči	Released: 2003; Formats: Cassette, CD, digital download, streaming; Label: Croatia Records, Tonika	(Note: Top of the Shops was launched in 2002 but a partial archive is only available from 2006 onwards.)

=== Collaborative albums ===
Title	Details	Peak chart positions
Title	Details	CRO
Ka hashish	With Tonči Huljić and Madre Badessa; Released: 2011; Formats: CD, digital download, streaming; Label: Croatia Records	3

=== Soundtrack albums ===
Title	Details	Peak chart positions
Title	Details	CRO
Larin izbor — Originalna glazba iz serije	With Tonči Huljić and Madre Badessa; Released: 2012; Formats: CD, digital download, streaming; Label: Croatia Records	1

=== Compilation albums ===
Title	Details	Peak chart positions
Title	Details	CRO
Uvertira: Best of 1995-2005	Released: 2005; Formats: CD, digital download, streaming; Label: Croatia Records, Tonika	—
The Platinum Collection	Released: 2007; Formats: CD, digital download, streaming; Label: Croatia Records, Tonika	—
The Best of Collection	Released: 2014; Formats: CD, digital download, streaming; Label: Croatia Records	26

== Singles ==
Title	Year	Peak chart positions	Album
Title	Year	CRO	Album
"Otkada nije mi tu"	1996	(Note: HR Top 40 was launched on 24 January 2013.)	Mjesec iznad oblaka
"Prosjak ljubavi"	1996	(Note: HR Top 40 was launched on 24 January 2013.)	Mjesec iznad oblaka
"Trebam nekoga"	1996	(Note: HR Top 40 was launched on 24 January 2013.)	Mjesec iznad oblaka
"Idi"	1997	(Note: HR Top 40 was launched on 24 January 2013.)	Mjesec iznad oblaka
"Ne boli me"	1997	(Note: HR Top 40 was launched on 24 January 2013.)	Mjesec iznad oblaka
"Ljubav sve pozlati"	1997	(Note: HR Top 40 was launched on 24 January 2013.)	Mjesec iznad oblaka
"Volim i postojim"	1997	(Note: HR Top 40 was launched on 24 January 2013.)	Mjesec iznad oblaka
"Utorak"	1998	(Note: HR Top 40 was launched on 24 January 2013.)	Utorak
"Ko nam brani"	1998	(Note: HR Top 40 was launched on 24 January 2013.)	Utorak
"Ljubav jedne žene"	1999	(Note: HR Top 40 was launched on 24 January 2013.)	Utorak
"Nevista"	1999	(Note: HR Top 40 was launched on 24 January 2013.)	Utorak
"Ni mrvu sriće"	2001	(Note: HR Top 40 was launched on 24 January 2013.)	Šporke riči
"Jedina"	2002	(Note: HR Top 40 was launched on 24 January 2013.)	Šporke riči
"Sad te se samo rijetko sjetim"	2003	(Note: HR Top 40 was launched on 24 January 2013.)	Šporke riči
"Vera od suvog zlata"	2003	(Note: HR Top 40 was launched on 24 January 2013.)	Šporke riči
"Amerika" (with Tonči Huljić & Madre Badessa)	2011	(Note: HR Top 40 was launched on 24 January 2013.)	Ka hashish
"Anarkišta" (with Tonči Huljić & Madre Badessa and Goran Bregović)	2011		Ka hashish
"Providenca" (with Tonči Huljić & Madre Badessa)	2012	Larin izbor	
"Uvik isti"	2014	2	The Best of Collection
"Moje zlato"	2015	1	Non-album singles
"Srce za vodiča" (with Hana Huljić)	2016	3	Non-album singles
"Ne znan za se"	2016	3	Non-album singles
"Ako te pitaju"	2017	1	Non-album singles
"Fritula"	2018	1	Non-album singles
"Unaprijed gotovo" (with Severina)	2018	4	Halo
"Voli me"	2018	1	Non-album singles
"Neće nas zauvik bit"	2020	1	Non-album singles
"Inamorana" (with Tonči Huljić & Madre Badessa)	2021	2	Non-album singles
"Jel' ti reka 'ko"	2021	1	Non-album singles
"Nemoj" (with Nina Badrić)	2023	1	Non-album singles
"Šta bi ja bez tebe"	2024	1	Non-album singles
"—" denotes a recording that did not chart or were not released.

== Videography ==
=== Music videos ===
Title	Year	Director(s)	Ref.
As lead artist
"Nemoj"(with Nina Badrić)	2023	Darko Drinovac	
As featured artist
"Unaprijed gotovo"(with Severina)	2016	Darko Drinovac	
