= Matija Cvek discography =

List of releases by Croatian singer Matija Cvek

- Studio albums: 2
- Live albums: 2
- Singles: 21

Croatian singer Matija Cvek has released 2 studio albums, 2 live albums, 21 singles and more than 18 music videos.

== Studio albums ==
| Title | Details | Peak chart positions |
| Title | Details | CRO |
|---|---|---|
| Izbirljivo i slučajno | Released: 16 April 2021; Label: Menart Records; Formats: CD, digital download, streaming | 1 |
| Vile se ovdje igraju | Released: 15 September 2023; Label: Menart Records; Formats: CD, LP, digital download, streaming | 1 |

== Live albums ==
| Title | Details |
|---|---|
| Izbirljivo i namjerno | Released: 2 December 2022; Label: Menart Records; Formats: Digital download, streaming |
| Live – Dom Sportova, Zagreb | Released: 2 June 2023; Label: Menart Records; Formats: Digital download, streaming |

== Singles ==
| Title | Year | Peak chart positions | | Album |
| Title | Year | CRO | | Album |
| Title | Year | Top 100 | Billboard | Album |
|---|---|---|---|---|
| "Magla sjećanja" | 2013 | — | (Note: Croatia Songs was launched on 15 February 2022.) | Non-album singles |
| "Noćas donijet ću gitaru" | 2014 | — | (Note: Croatia Songs was launched on 15 February 2022.) | Non-album singles |
| "Potraži me u jeseni" | 2016 | — | (Note: Croatia Songs was launched on 15 February 2022.) | Non-album singles |
| "Visine" | 2018 | — | (Note: Croatia Songs was launched on 15 February 2022.) | Izbirljivo i slučajno |
| "Praviš me ludim" | 2018 | 13 | (Note: Croatia Songs was launched on 15 February 2022.) | Izbirljivo i slučajno |
| "Probudi se" | 2019 | 12 | (Note: Croatia Songs was launched on 15 February 2022.) | Izbirljivo i slučajno |
| "Ako nađem nekoga" | 2019 | 12 | (Note: Croatia Songs was launched on 15 February 2022.) | Non-album singles |
| "Drama" | 2019 | 18 | (Note: Croatia Songs was launched on 15 February 2022.) | Izbirljivo i slučajno |
| "Nasloni se" (with Matija Dedić) | 2020 | 14 | (Note: Croatia Songs was launched on 15 February 2022.) | Izbirljivo i slučajno |
| "Plaža" | 2020 | 7 | (Note: Croatia Songs was launched on 15 February 2022.) | Izbirljivo i slučajno |
| "Blizu (69)" | 2020 | 8 | (Note: Croatia Songs was launched on 15 February 2022.) | Izbirljivo i slučajno |
| "Ptice" | 2021 | 4 | (Note: Croatia Songs was launched on 15 February 2022.) | Izbirljivo i slučajno |
| "Trebaš li me" (with Eni Jurišić) | 2022 | 1 | 3 | Non-album singles |
| "Zar je ljubav spala na to" (with Jelena Rozga) | 2022 | 4 | — | Minut srca mog |
| "Ne moram ni ja" (with the Funkensteins) | 2022 | 6 | — | Izbirljivo i namjerno |
| "Oprostija bi sve" (with Buđenje) | 2023 | 2 | — | Brudet |
| "Kraj Save" (with the Funkensteins) | 2023 | 7 | — | Non-album singles |
| "Zalazak" (with the Funkensteins) | 2023 | — | — | Non-album singles |
| "Pola sunca" (with Marija Šerifović) | 2023 | — | 3 | Dolazi ljubav |
| "Nudim ti se" | 2024 | 2 | — | Non-album singles |
| "Moje" | 2025 | 1 | — | Non-album singles |
| "Pristajem" (with Lelek) | 2025 | 4 | — | Non-album singles |
| "Nisam taj" | 2026 | 4 | — | Non-album singles |
| "Dvoje mladih" | 2026 | 1 | — | Non-album singles |
"—" denotes a single that did not chart or was not released in that territory.
