= Tonika Records =

Croatian record label owned by composer Tonči Huljić

- Industry: Music industry
- Headquarters: Split, Croatia
- Key people: Tonči Huljić, Vjekoslava Huljić
- Products: Audio CD, DVD-Video, Audio cassette, Gramophone record
- Revenue: €554.936
- Parent: AUTOR d.o.o.
- Website: www.toncihuljic.com

Tonika Records is a record label in Croatia owned by Tonči Huljić, based in Split. The company was established on 27 April 2005 by his son Ivan Huljić, who served as the procurer and his wife Vjekoslava Huljić who serves as a member of the board.

== Background ==
Croatian composer and lyricist Ivan Huljić is the founder of Tonika Records. His father, composer and music producer Tonči Huljić is a board member and director. Vjekoslava Huljić serves as a member. The company was established on 27 April 2005. Tonči Huljić also announced the plans to launch a radio station based on the company in 2020.

== Finances ==
According to a Financial Agency (Financijska agencija) account, Huljić's company generated just over 2.000.000 kuna in revenue and almost 350.000 kuna in profit in 2019. The total revenue of the company in 2024 was €554.936.

== Album releases ==
Several notable artists working under its name include Electro Team, Jasmin Stavros, Minea, Joško Čagalj Jole, Boris Novković, Danijela Martinović, Sandi Cenov, Petar Dragojević, Petar Grašo, Doris Dragović, Tonči Huljić & Madre Badessa, Magazin, Jelena Rozga and Hana Huljić. The company has more than 153 releases recorded on Discogs.

== See also ==
- Music of Croatia
- Croatian popular music
- List of record labels
