= Lavica =

Single by Jelena Rozga
- Released: 24 June 2024
- Recorded: 2024
- Genre: Pop
- Length: 3:41
- Label: Croatia Records
- Composer: Tonči Huljić
- Lyricist: Vjekoslava Huljić
- Producers: Tonči Huljić; Hrvoje Domazet

Jelena Rozga singles chronology
"Od čega sam ja" (2024)	"Lavica" (2024)	"Začarani krug" (2025)

Music video
- "Lavica" on YouTube

"Lavica" (English: Lioness) is a song by Croatian singer and artist Jelena Rozga. The song premiered on the Melodije Hrvatskog Jadrana Festival on 24 June 2024. It was written by the Croatian composer, songwriter duo Tonči and Vjekoslava Huljić. Lyrically, it discusses a strong female protagonist who compares her strength to her paternal figure. An accompanying music video was directed by Franjo Matković and premiered on 24 July 2024. The song was highly commercially successful, peaking at number two on the HR Top 40 chart. It also achieved huge success with the singer's audience and media started comparing it to her previous hit "Bižuterija".

== Background ==
The song was written by the Huljić duo while the arrangement was finalized by Tonči Huljić together with Hrvoje Domazet. It received very positive feedback from the singer's audience. During an interview, Rozga expressed her wishes to have the song surpass her previous biggest hit "Bižuterija", which was also the reaction of her fans according to media outlets. During another podcast in 2026, Rozga selected the song as her favorite one of all her repertoire, and revealed how it was because it reminded her of her father, "of the period he had to go through" which the song evokes.

During an interview, Rozga revealed that the conception of the song, which was started with MHJ in mind, took five days. She called it a simple, pop song with a resonance towards the female audience as it shares the story of a woman who is strong and "fights". In conclusion, she also called it a "throwback to some older times". The song also compares the protagonist's strength to that of her father, which Rozga said was done on purpose as she herself is very close to her father. This marks the second song, after "Dalmatinka" to make a reference to her father. It won the Cesarica Award for Hit of August in 2024.

== Critical reception ==
Croatian music critic Anđelo Jurkas of Mixer rated "Lavica" 7/10, writing: "This time, Tonći and Vjeka, in a mashed-up Latin Greek style and rhythm, give [Rozga] a template that traces back to the first generation, from where [she] tells the suitors for her body and heart that, through her father, she's a lioness – all in a very ringing and palatable chorus in the classic H. stamp and manner."

Upon its release, the song was very successful with the audience, with media reporting how it surpassed the catchphrase "žena, majka, kraljica" from "Bižuterija". During an interview with Klix.ba, Rozga shared how satisfied she was with the success of the song and the audience's response only three months past its release, saying: "I saw that in a matter of days the song as if it were there for years. It is unbelievable that it is sung by both youngsters and the elderly... Male, female, it does not matter. It is really, I should not just say hit, but megahit". She went on to say how she found it rare in her career that such big hits occur and that it was a surprising moment to see a simple song achieve such success "in the sea of mega-productions".

== Music video ==
A music video for the song directed by Franjo Matković was released on 24 July 2024. The singer briefly teased a behind-the-scenes snippet on Instagram on 4 July 2024. The clip features her singing the song in a room dressed all in red and accompanied by a love interest.

== Live performances ==
On 24 June 2024, Rozga performed the song "Lavica" on the Melodije Hrvatskog Jadrana Festival donned in a black dress and presenting a new hairstyle. She later performed it again during a concert given at the 2024 Cesarica Awards.

== Chart performance ==
"Lavica" debuted at number 16 on the HR Top 40 chart for the week ending 24 June 2024. The following week, it moved to a position of three, before reaching its peak position of two in the week of 8 July 2024 in its third week on the chart. After that, the song fell to the position of number four in its fourth week on the chart on 15 July 2024.

At the end of the years, "Lavica" appeared at numbers 12 and 14 on the HR Top 100 annual chart for 2024 and 2025, respectively. It additionally appeared at number 14 on the half-annual chart in 2025.

=== Weekly charts ===
Chart performance for "Lavica"
Chart (2024)	Peak position
Croatia (HR Top 40)	2

=== Year-end charts ===
2024 year-end chart performance for "Lavica"
Chart (2024)	Position
Croatia (HR Top 100)	12

2025 year-end chart performance for "Lavica"
Chart (2025)	Position
Croatia (HR Top 100)	14
