= Melodije Jadrana 2023 =

Croatian music festival

Dates and venue
- Semi-final 1: 23 June 2023
- Semi-final 2: 24 June 2023
- Final: 25 June 2023
- Venue: Galerija Meštrović, Split

Organisation
- Broadcaster: HRT
- Artistic director: Neno Belan
- Presenters: Duško Ćurlić and Monica Jakšić

Vote
- Number of entries: 25

Melodije Jadrana 2023 was the first edition of the Melodije Jadrana festival, a song contest held annually in Split, Croatia. The show was held between 23 and 25 June 2023, and was presented by Duško Ćurlić and Monica Jakšić. Neno Belan served as the artistic director for the competition.

== Format ==
The 2023 edition of the Melodije Jadrana festival was held at the Galerija Meštrović in Split, Croatia. The festival was held over the course of three days with the main event being held 25 June 2023. 25 entries were chosen to compete in the main event with Tonči Huljić and The Beat Fleet holding concerts on the first two days of the event. The artistic director for the competition was Neno Belan.

== Competing entries ==
Competing songs and artists, showing writers and producers
Song, performing artist(s) and writer(s)
"Ajmo u đir" — Neno Belan & Mia Dimšić
(Neno Belan, Nikša Sviličić)
"Ako ona nije ta" – Ivica Sikirić Ićo & Giuliano Đanić
(Rudolf Dvorski, Hrvoje Domazet)
"Daj šta daš" – Sergej Ćetković
(Sergej Ćetković, Mahir Sarihodžić)
"Dvije obale" – Ivan Ive Županović & Antonia Dora Pleško
(Vinko Barčot, Leo Škaro)
"Fali cviće" – Goran Karan
(Goran Karan, Nikša Bratoš)
"Idi ti" – Jelena Rozga
(Tonči Huljić, Vjekoslava Huljić, Hrvoje Domazet)
"Jedna na sto" – Domenica
(Tonči Huljić, Vjekoslava Huljić, Leo Škaro)
"Jel moguće" – Lorena
(Tonči Huljić, Vjekoslava Huljić, Leo Škaro)
"Jubavi svitlo" – Zorica Kondža & Jacques Houdek
(Mario Božić, Joško Banov)
"Kad bi" – Cambi
(Ivan Huljić, Hrvoje Domazet)
"Kad god poželiš" – Marko Kutlić
(Marko Kutlić, Antonio David Perina, Aleksandar Čubrilo, Hrvoje Domazet)
"Ludost" – Ivo Peruškić & Nataša Janjić
(Ines Prajo, Arijana Kunštek, Ivan Popeskić)
"Miško moj" – Jole
(Tonči Huljić, Vjekoslava Huljić, Leo Škaro)
"Najljepši cvijet" – Adi Šoše
(Amil Lojo)
"Naopaka pjesma" – Pavel
(Aljoša Šerić, Jere Šešelja)
"Našu pismu pivaju" – Tomislav Bralić & Klapa Intrade
(Vinko Barčot, Leo Škaro)
"Nemoj" – Petar Grašo & Nina Badrić
(Tonči Huljić, Vjekoslava Huljić, Leo Škaro)
"Pitali me anđeli" – Rišpet
(Pero Kozomara, Robert Pilepić, Leo Škaro)
"Plovin tvojin tilon" – Tedi Spalato
(Tomislav Mrduljaš, Luka Mrduljaš, Rando Stipišić)
"Pučina" – Stjepan Lach
(MaTune Music, Goran Kovačić)
"Ruke sigurne" – Marko Tolja
(Marko Tolja, Ivan Popeskić)
"Stavljam sve na ovu ljubav" – Klapa Kampanel
(Darko Bakić, Igor Ivanović)
"Vrijeme laži" – Marija Mirković
(Marija Mirković, Nenad Ninčević, Hrvoje Domazet)
"Zalazak" – Matija Cvek
(Matija Cvek, Marko Dundović, Tomislav Mihaljević)
"Zbogom ljube" – Hari Rončević
(Hari Rončević, Albert Rimić)

== Shows ==
=== First night ===
The first night was held on 23 June 2023 and consisted of a concert by Croatian singer and songwriter Tonči Huljić. Huljić performed "Marija Magdalena", "Suze biserne", "Ako te pitaju", "Providenca", "Ja san rojen da mi bude lipo" and "Dvaput san umra". Guest vocalists featured in some of the performances were Hana Huljić, Karlo Vudrić and Lorena Bućan.

=== Second night ===
The second night was held on 24 June 2023 and consisted of a concert by Croatian band The Beat Fleet. The band performed a set of their biggest hits including "Grad spava", "Alles gut", "Veseljko", "Moja mater te traži", "Papilova", "Sa mog prozora", "Smak svita" and others.

=== Third night ===
The third and final night was held on 25 June 2023. It included performances of 25 new songs selected by the festival committee.

Third night: 25 June 2023
Draw	Artist	Song			
Draw	Artist	Song	1	Ivan Ive Županović & Antonia Dora Pleško	"Dvije obale"
2	Stjepan Lach	"Pučina"			
3	Klapa Kampanel	"Stavljam sve na ovu ljubav"			
4	Adi Šoše	"Najljepši cvijet"			
5	Marija Mirković	"Vrijeme laži"			
6	Cambi	"Kad bi"			
7	Ivo Peruškić & Nataša Janjić	"Ludost"			
8	Domenica	"Jedna na sto"			
9	Marko Kutlić	"Kad god poželiš"			
10	Ivica Sikirić Ićo & Giuliano Đanić	"Ako ona nije ta"			
11	Pavel	"Naopaka pjesma"			
12	Zorica Kondža & Jacques Houdek	"Jubavi svitlo"			
13	Jole	"Miško moj"			
14	Marko Tolja	"Ruke sigurne"			
15	Lorena	"Jel moguće"			
16	Matija Cvek	"Zalazak"			
17	Hari Rončević	"Zbogom ljube"			
18	Tedi Spalato	"Plovin tvojin tilon"			
19	Rišpet	"Pitali me anđeli"			
20	Klapa Kampanel	"Stavljam sve na ovu ljubav"			
21	Goran Karan	"Fali cviće"			
22	Tomislav Bralić & Klapa Intrade	"Našu pismu pivaju"			
23	Neno Belan & Mia Dimšić	"Ajmo u đir"			
24	Jelena Rozga	"Idi ti"			
25	Petar Grašo & Nina Badrić	"Nemoj"			

== Special guests ==
The special guest of Melodije Jadrana 2023 included a medley performance of Doris Dragović's biggest hits.
