= Vjekoslava Huljić =

Croatian lyricist and author

- Born: Vjekoslava Tolić; 27 March 1963 (age 63); Duvno, PR Bosnia and Herzegovina, FPR Yugoslavia
- Education: University of Split
- Occupations: Lyricist, Novel writer
- Years active: 1981–present
- Spouse: Tonči Huljić (m. 1987)
- Children: 2; Ivan and Hana
- Awards: Anto Gardaš Prize

Vjekoslava Huljić (née Tolić; born on 27 March 1963) is a Croatian lyricist, songwriter, novelist, and writer. Born in Duvno and raised in Split, Huljić emerged as a successful lyricist with several hits from the Croatian group Magazin. She is considered to be one of the most productive and successful Croatian writers and lyricists and is most widely known for her collaborations with her husband and musician Tonči Huljić.

Her literary work targets both young and old audiences. In the span of her career, Huljić has written more than 600 songs, many of which have become best-selling singles of the respective artists they were written for, primarily Magazin, Jelena Rozga, Doris Dragović, Jole, Minea, Petar Grašo and Danijela Martinović. Her latest works with Lorena, Domenica and Tonči Huljić & Madre Badessa Band, include her writing using loanwords of the Dalmatian language.

== Biography ==
Huljić was born as Vjekoslava Tolić in 1963 in Duvno to a mother Iva Tolić, from Kolo, and a father, Branko Tolić, a lawyer, from Imotski. Huljić is the middle one of three sisters. During her childhood, she moved to Split together with her parents. During her childhood, Vjekoslava Huljić followed piano classes for eleven years. Additionally, she used to play festival games with her sisters and perform songs by Italian singer-songwriter Sergio Endrigo in front of her parents.

Huljić attended the primary school Bratstvo i jedinstvo in Split. As a very reserved and shy child, her family did not know whether she would adapt to communicating in school. Nevertheless, her teacher Kario Anka recognized her talent for writing and shared her work with the classes she was attending proclaiming "still waters run deep". In her adolescence, Huljić studied law at the University of Split. She chose law since there were no literary studies at the university at the time and her father urged her to stay in Split. She only worked for four years in law as a judge trainee before switching to a more literary direction with poem, novel and songwriting.

== Songwriting career ==
In 1981, Huljić debuted at the annual Zagrebfest with a song titled "Ne brini ništa". She continued her songwriting career with several songs from Magazin albums which was then still emerging as a band. Two of the biggest hits she wrote for the band while Ljiljana Nikolovska was still its lead singer were "Rano ranije", "Balkanska ulica" and "Ljube se dobri, loši, zli". On several of the earlier Magazin songs, she also worked together with Serbian songwriter Marina Tucaković. In 1991, when Nikolovska was leaving the group, she was succeeded by Danijela Martinović; Huljić wrote several of the biggest hits she sang in the group, which include "Da mi te zaljubit u mene (Starimo dušo)", "Čari" and "Tišina" which were all included on the album Da mi te zaljubit u mene (1991). As the album was being released in the period of the Croatian War of Independence (1991-1995), she wrote the antiwar and peace-promoting song "Mir, mir, mir do neba". The lyrics "Ko iz Rata Svjetova, pokraj crnih cvjetova, suze od Boga" makes reference to The War of the Worlds by English author Herbert George Wells. In it, Huljić compares the sights seen by the song's protagonist in the midst of the war to the sights of desolation witnessed by the main protagonist from the book. When Martinović embarked on a solo career, Huljić also served as one of the main songwriters of her songs "Zovem te ja" (1996) and "Da je slađe zaspati" (1998). She is also the songwriter of many top singles arranged and produced by her husband Tonči Huljić, a musician and a producer.

She was involved in a controversy after writing the lyrics of "Nirvana" in 2011; several Croatian feminist institutions threatened they would sue her for destroying female emancipation and asked for her to be brought to trial.

== 1986-onwards: Poem and novel writing ==
She emerged as a writer in 1986 when she published her first collection of poems, titled Jutrooki. The fable Čampro Vjekoslava wrote features Ivan and Hana as the main characters; it was put on stage and performed in 1996 at the Split Puppet Theatre. She in turn, heard the fable from her own grandfather who used to tell her the story when she was a child. Her book Gen anđela is a book for adults in which she was inspired by magical realism. The plot features three generations of women and the main protagonist who is a Chilean with Croatian descent who goes back to her native island in an exploration of her own identity. After that, she also published several children's books and novels. In 2020, she received the Anto Gardaš Prize for her novel Moj Titanic ne tone.

During the stay at home measures taken during the COVID-19 pandemic on 28 May 2020, Huljić professionally recited "Loneliness" bi Rainer Maria Rilke for the literature portal Librarijancija.

In 2022, Vjekoslava Huljić presented her fourteenth book titled La Petite Marie by publisher Večernji list. The book had its promotion at the Bogdan Ogrizović library in Zagreb, where journalist Dražen Klarić and novel editor Žarko Ivković, attended together with literary writer Julijana Matanović and film theorist Daniel Rafaelić. Excerpts from the book were read by Anja Šovagović Despot. The book, which takes place in Split and Paris, revolves around family life and the search for identity and roots. Upon its release, the book was described as the author's "most mature work yet". The event was attended by the Huljić family and Vjekoslava appeared dressed in a dark blue suit.

== Creative process ==
Describing her creative process, Huljić said in an interview "I was never attracted to camera lights. A writer creates in loneliness and silence, and the main role is his creation, not himself. I have always preferred to turn to my inner being and the lights of people which attract my attention". Discussing her songwriting process, Huljić has revealed that it usually starts with her husband composing a piece of music which elicits a certain type of emotion in her; she mostly uses paper to write songs while a computer she only uses to write books. At the beginning of their career, the duo was composing around 120 songs per year. As a writer, Vjekoslava Huljić has often produced lyrics that her husband considered to be "very literary" which he urged her to simplify. She also revealed during an interview that writing lyrics can take place during the evening as well and that she often dreams lyrics of her songs.

== Personal life and accolades ==
Vjekoslava Huljić has received two Zlatno pero (Croatian: Golden feather) awards in the category of Best Young Literary Artist in primary school.

In 1987, Vjekoslava Huljić married Tonči Huljić, with whom she has two children, Ivan and Hana Huljić. The two met when they were 18 years old during a concert where Tonči was playing the piano; they dated for seven to eight years before they married when Vjekoslava was 26 years old. Despite their widespread popularity in Croatia and the wider Balkan region, the two kept their lives private and far from the media.

== Artistry and legacy ==
Vjekoslava Huljić is considered to be among the ten most performed and most demanded Croatian authors. She was also dubbed the "favorite child author". In the span of her career, Vjekoslava Huljić has written more than 600 songs, 12 books, and all the songs of 2 musicals. The most famous Croatian recording artists whose lyrics she has written include Magazin, Doris Dragović, Jelena Rozga, Petar Grašo, Danijela Martinović, and Oliver Dragojević. Some other artists she has written for include Croatian singers Jole, Lorena, Domenica and Tonči Huljić & Madre Badessa Band. Huljić revealed that the biggest inspiration she draws is from the ordinary people of Dalmatia, the region where she lives, the Mediterranean lifestyle they have, and other life stories.

The lyrics of Vjekoslava Huljić's most famous song "Bižuterija", describe the experience of a dissatisfied woman who is left by her partner after having been treated as "bijouterie". The lyrics "žena, majka, kraljica" ("a woman, a mother, a queen") which are a part of the chorus became a catchphrase among the public on the Balkans, used to describe a powerful woman who can easily solve her life problems; the line is considered to be her most trademark lyric. The phrase gained widespread use among females who used it to support and empower each other. Other trademark lyrics she has written include "Bit' će bolje od ponedjeljka" ("It will be better from Monday onwards") from Danijela Martinović's "Život Stati Neće".

The fable about Čampro she wrote was put on stage and performed in 1996 at Split Puppet Theatre. Her other stories about children were also put to screen by Hrvatska radiotelevizija.

== Literary works ==
- Jutrooki, poem collection (1986)
- Čampro, fable collection (2000)
- Maksove šumotvorine, novel (2002)
- Oči u oči s nebom, novel (2003)
- Lonac za čarolije, fabel collection (2007)
- Moj tata je lud za mnom, novel (2011)
- Gen anđela, novel (2011)
- Moja baka ima dečka, novel (2013)
- Moja sestra je mrak, novel (2015)
- Moji misle da ja lažem, novel (2016)
- Moje ljeto s Picassom, children novel (2018)
- Moj Titanic ne tone, novel (2019)
- La Petite Marie (2022)
- Upomoć! Mene je strah! (2024), 3-5 year-old children novel

== Selected discography ==
- "Rano ranije", Magazin
- "Balkanska ulica", Magazin
- "Ljube se dobri, loši, zli", Magazin
- "Dva put san umra", Oliver Dragojević (1995)
- "Suze biserne", Magazin (1996)
- "Da je slađe zaspati", Danijela Martinović (1997)
- "Rano", Minea (1998)
- "Marija Magdalena", Doris Dragović (1999)
- "Zar je ljubav spala na to", Magazin featuring Tifa (2001)
- "Bižuterija", Jelena Rozga (2010)
- "Providenca", Tonči Huljić & Madre Badessa (2014)
- "Pismo-Glava", Jelena Rozga (2016)
- "Ne Pijem, Ne Pušim", Jelena Rozga (2017)
- "Ako te pitaju", Petar Grašo (2017)
- "Sveto Pismo", Jelena Rozga (2020)
- "Idi Ti", Jelena Rozga (2023)
- "Lavica", Jelena Rozga (2024)
- "Začarani krug", Jelena Rozga (2025)
- "Kao žena ženi", Magazin (2025)

== See also ==
- Tonči Huljić
- Music of Croatia
- Popular music in Croatia
- Popular music in Yugoslavia
