= Electricity (disambiguation) =

Electricity is the set of physical phenomena associated with the presence and motion of electric charge.

Electricity may also refer to:

== Film and television ==
- Electricity (film), a film released in 2014
- "Electricity", an episode of Afterworld
- "Electricity", a Series E episode of the television series QI (2007)
- "Electricity", an episode of The Science Alliance
- "Electricity, Electricity", an episode of Schoolhouse Rock!

== Music ==
=== Albums ===
- Electricity (album), by Peter Jefferies
- Electricity, by Paul Janz
- Electricity, by Electones

=== Songs ===
- "Electricity" (The Avalanches song)
- "Electricity" (Captain Beefheart song)
- "Electricity" (Elton John song)
- "Electricity" (Orchestral Manoeuvres in the Dark song)
- "Electricity" (Silk City and Dua Lipa song)
- "Electricity" (Suede song)
- "Electricity", by Anathema from A Natural Disaster
- "Electricity", by Blood Axis
- "Electricity", by Elisa from Lotus
- "Electricity", by Headless Chickens from Greedy
- "Electricity", by Longview from Mercury
- "Electricity", by Lync from Remembering the Fireballs (Part 8)
- "Electricity", by Midnight Star from No Parking on the Dance Floor
- "Electricity", by Joni Mitchell from For the Roses
- "Electricity", by Kompressor from World Domination
- "Electricity", by Moby from "Drop a Beat"
- "Electricity", by Monrose from I Am
- "Electricity", by Motörhead from Bad Magic
- "Electricity", by Pet Shop Boys from Bilingual
- "Electricity", by Spiritualized from Ladies and Gentlemen We Are Floating in Space
- "Electricity", by Something for Kate from Beautiful Sharks
- "Electricity", by 311 from Transistor
- "Electricity, Electricity", from TV-series Schoolhouse Rock!, released on Schoolhouse Rock! Soundtrack
  - covered by Goodness on Schoolhouse Rock! Rocks

=== Other uses in music ===
- Electricity: OMD with the Royal Liverpool Philharmonic Orchestra, a concert film

== Books ==
- Electricity, 1995 novel by Victoria Glendinning
- Electricity, 2006 novel by Ray Robinson

== See also ==
- Electric (disambiguation)
- Electric City (disambiguation)
