= Od Čega Sam Ja =

Single by Jelena Rozga
- Released: 22 March 2024
- Recorded: 2024
- Genre: Pop
- Length: 3:14
- Label: Croatia Records
- Songwriter: Ivan Huljić
- Producer: Ivan Huljić

Jelena Rozga singles chronology
"Idi Ti" (2023)	"Od Čega Sam Ja" (2024)	"Lavica" (2024)

Music video
- "Od Čega Sam Ja" (official video 2024) HD) on YouTube

"Od Čega Sam Ja" (English: What Am I Made Of) is a song by Croatian pop singer Jelena Rozga. The song was written and produced by Ivan Huljić while the arrangement was finalized together with Leo Škaro and Darko Dimitrov. The song had its premiere on 22 March 2024 when it was released as a single. It is a ballad which discusses the female protagonist's strengths and weaknesses, both of which seem to amaze her.

A music video for the song, directed by Miloš Šarović and released on the same day as the song, portrays Rozga, dressed in black, in several artistic scenes, including holding a burning newspaper, performing a choreography backed by dancing singers and in various rooms while singing the song. As of April 2022, the video has more than 650.000 views on the video streaming platform YouTube. For the week ending 25 March 2024, "Od čega sam ja" debuted at number 9 on the Croatian HR Top 40.

== Background ==
On 22 March 2024, Rozga released the single "Od čega Sam Ja", written and produced by Ivan Huljić while arranged by him and Leo Škaro and Darko Dimitrov. Lyrically, the song discusses both the strengths and the weaknesses of a wounded woman who seems to be amazed at the fact that she can overcome the obstacles on her path. The song marks Rozga's first fast-tempo song in the streak of songs released. It involves her singing using her higher register.

Rozga first teased the song to her fans on 19 March along with a shot from its music video posted on her official Instagram account. In the video's description, she shared the song's lyrics "Sve puca, a ja cijela ostala" (English: Everything is falling apart and I am still whole). Upon the release, the excerpt video received numerous positive comments from her fanbase. Afterwards, she announced it would be released on 22 March 2024 again, alongside excerpts.

Alongside the release, Rozga wrote the following passage about the song's conception: "It is always good to work with someone, who, one could say you know to the soul and that they know how important it is to stay faithful to yourself. I enjoyed in the entire process of making this song, from the first recorded melodies to the end of the filming of the music video which I find to be a real visual dessert and I cannot wait to hear the reactions of my fanbase".

In 2024, the song received the Cesarica Award for Hit of May. Croatian music critic Anđelo Jurkas of Mixer rated the song 7.5/10, praising it as Huljić's moment of coming out of the shadows and deeming the song a "perfect example of modernly produced 'showbiz' pop". (Note: Croatian: "...Ivan Huljić autorski servisira Jelenu Rozgu odličnim primjerom moderno producranog estrada popa")

== Music video ==
A music video for the song premiered on 22 March, directed by Miloš Šarović. NN media served as the production company led by producer Aleksandar Pejčić. It features artistic shots of Rozga singing the song to the camera including her in front of a beam of light in a dark foggy room, surrounded by dancers, her in a space surrounded by red flower leaves and singing the song to the camera while holding a burning newspaper in her hands which features the headline "Od Čega Sam". In other scenes, she is also seen lying on the floor together with numerous backing dancers with several flowers in their arms. In most scenes, she is seen dressed in black with a black hat on her head. A naked male model can be also seen in the clip as Rozga is seen approaching him during some scenes. Towards the bridge and final chorus, Rozga sings the song while completely surrounded by flames. As of April 2026, the video has more than 2.6 million views on YouTube. Jurkas of Mixer praised Rozga's young look in the video and compared her look to Serbian singer Nataša Bekvalac.

== Live performance ==
To promote the song, Rozga performed it live during her concert given as part of the 2024 Cesarica Awards.

== Charts ==
For the week ending 25 March 2024, "Od čega sam ja" debuted at number 9 on the Croatian HR Top 40, which also marked the highest entry on the chart for that week. For the following two weeks, the song moved to the position of 10 on the chart.

At the end of the year, "Od čega sam ja" was placed at number 32 on the Annual HR Top 100 chart, being Rozga's second entry together with "Lavica".

=== Weekly charts ===
Chart performance for "Od Čega Sam Ja"
Chart (2024)	Peak position
Croatia (HR Top 40)	9

=== Year-end charts ===
2024 year-end chart performance for "Od Čega Sam Ja"
Chart (2024)	Position
Croatia (HR Top 100)	32

== Credits ==
Credits for "Od čega sam ja" are adopted from the official music video's YouTube description.

Song credits

- Music: Ivan Huljić
- Lyrics: Ivan Huljić
- Music arrangement: Leo Škaro, Darko Dimitrov, Ivan Huljić
- Mix: Leo Škaro
- Mastering: Goran Martinac

Video credits

- Director: Miloš Šarović
- DOP: Nemanja Novaković
- Producer: Aleksandar Pejčić
- Production: NN media
- Organizer: Sofija Petković
- 1st AD: Rale Obrenov
- Editor: Marija Šarac
- Vfx: Andrija Grkić
- Scenography: Orjen Djurić
- Color correction: Nikola Marinković
- Focus puller: Miodrag Todorović
- Gaffer: Miloš Vučenović
- Grips: Ivan Leković Garac
- Choreographer: Jelena Bulatović
- Dancers: Jelena Bulatović, Tamara Pjević, Andrea Dobrić, Natalija Djikanovic
- Model: Marko Kraljević
- Stylist (Jelena Rozga): Miloš Oks
- MUA (Jelena Rozga): Saša Joković
- MUA (models): Irena Miletić
- Hair stylist (Jelena Rozga): Maja Stanišić
- Hair stylist (models): Maja Stanišić
