= The Movies (Maksim Mrvica album) =

Studio album by Maksim Mrvica
- Released: November 1, 2012
- Recorded: 2010–2012
- Genres: Soundtrack, pop, instrumental
- Length: 43:57
- Label: MBO Records

Maksim Mrvica chronology
Appassionata (2010)	The Movies (2012)

The Movies is a 2012 studio album of Croatian pianist Maksim Mrvica.

== Track listing ==
1. Mission Impossible/Theme (Lalo Schifrin/Danny Elfman)
2. The Godfather/Love Theme (Nino Rota)
3. Pirates of the Caribbean/He's a Pirate (Klaus Badelt)
4. Gladiator/Now We Are Free (Hans Zimmer)
5. The Glass Mountain/Legend of the Glass Mountain (Nino Rota)
6. Snow Flower (Ryoki Matsumoto)
7. Larah's Choice/Providenza (Tonči Huljić)
8. Rocky/Gonna Fly Now (Bill Conti)
9. Rollerball/ Bach's Toccata & Fugue (André Previn)
10. Amélie/La Valse D'Amélie(Yann Tiersen)
11. The Piano/The Heart Asks Pleasure First (Michael Nyman)
12. Spartacus/Love Theme (Alex North)
