= Electric (disambiguation) =

Electric relates to electricity.

Electric may also refer to:

== Literature ==
- "I Sing the Body Electric" (poem), a poem by Walt Whitman (and many later works derived from it)

== Films ==
- The Electric Man, an american 2022 film

== Music ==
- Electric guitar, a type of guitar
- Electronic Drum, a type of drum

=== Albums ===
- Electric (The Cult album)
- Electric (Jack Ingram album)
- Electric (Paul Rodgers album)
- Electric (Pet Shop Boys album)
- Electric (Richard Thompson album)
- Electrik, an album by Maksim Mrvica

=== Songs ===
- "Electric" (Girlband song)
- "Electric" (Katy Perry song)
- "Electric" (Leila K song)
- "Electric" (Lisa Scott-Lee song)
- "Electric" (Melody Club song), also covered by Slava and by Cameron Cartio
- "Electric" (Omarion song)
- "Electric" (Robyn song)
- "Electric", a song by Shawn Desman from the album Fresh

== Other uses ==
- Electric (music producers), Norwegian songwriting and production duo
- Electric (software), an electronic design automation software tool
- Electric locomotive, a locomotive whose power comes from electricity

== See also ==
- Electricity (disambiguation)
- Electric City (disambiguation)
