= Croatian Rhapsody =

Studio album by Maksim Mrvica
- Released: 2015

Maksim Mrvica chronology
Mezzo E Mezzo (2015)	Croatian Rhapsody (2015)

Croatian Rhapsody is a 2015 album by the Croatian pianist, Maksim Mrvica. The title track, "Croatian Rhapsody", was included in his 2003 album, The Piano Player, and his 2008 album, Greatest Maksim. It was composed by the Croatian musician and songwriter Tonči Huljić and is one of Maksim's greatest hits.

== Track listing ==
1. Exodus (Remix) (Ernest Gold)
2. Flight of the Bumblebee (Remix) (N. Rimsky-Korsakov)
3. Croatian Rhapsody (Remix) (Tonči Huljić)
4. Mission Impossible (Remix) (Lalo Schifrin)
5. Hall of the Mountain King (Remix) (E. Grieg)
6. Claudine (Remix) (Tonči Huljić)
7. Samba de Roda (Tonči Huljić)
8. Child in Paradise (Remix) (Tonči Huljić)
9. Above the Clouds (Tonči Huljić)
10. Wonderland (Remix) (Tonči Huljić)
