= Tonči Huljić & Madre Badessa Band =

Tonči Huljić & Madre Badessa band is a Croatian pop–ethno group. The author of the project is Tonči Huljić together with Vjekoslava Huljić and Goran Bregović. The band was founded in 2011 in Huljić's home city of Split. It debuted on the music scene during the final show of Dora 2011, when it performed the song "Anarkišta" (together with Bregović), "Ka hashish" and "Amerika". Singer Petar Grašo served as a guest artist to the band.

== Background ==
The first studio album, Ka hashish, was promoted on 2 May 2011 in Split. The music video for "Amerika" was filmed at the end of September the same year, directed by Gitak TV. In 2012, they published an album with songs of the TV series Larin izbor, a Mediterranean story featuring two young lovers of different social standings. The album featured songs "Samo jubav ostaje (Vrime o' mižer'je)" and "Providenca" as well as original and instrumental compositions of the previous album Ka hashish. The music of the song is written by Tonči Huljić, lyrics by Vjekoslava Huljić, while some arrangement and production is finalized by Goran Bregović. Songs are written using an old dialect from the Split region of Varoš.

On 30 June 2025, the band released the song "Život ode nabrzaka" featuring Bosnian singer Amira Medunjanin. The song with lyrics related to noticing the details of everyday life in a world that moves very fast was arranged by Tonči Huljić and Leo Škaro while the lyrics were finished by Vjekoslava Huljić. A music video for the song directed by PILOT studio was also filmed.

On 5 March 2026, the song "Dans mon bled (Doma gren)" was released. It marked a collaboration of the band with Frankophone band Jall Aux Yeux. A music video by PILOT studio was also released.

== Članovi ==
- Tonči Huljić – keyboards, harmonica, vocals
- Petar Grašo – vocals
- Ninoslav Ademović Ninđa – keyboard, harmonica, percussion
- Mario Bavčević – mandolin
- Jurica Rukljić – horn
- Miro Trgo – backing vocals
- Emil Arsov- vocals

== Discography ==
=== Studio albums ===
- Ka hashish (2011), Croatia Records/Tonika Records
- Panika (2014), Croatia Records/Tonika,.
- Tipo primitivo / Piano primitivo (2017), Croatia Records/Tonika
- Inamorana (2021), Croatia Records/Tonika

=== Soundtrack albums ===
- Larin izbor (Originalna glazba iz serije) (2012), Croatia Records

=== Compilation albums ===
- The Best Of (2015) Croatia Records/Tonika
