= Electrik =

Studio album by Maksim Mrvica
- Released: October 20, 2006
- Recorded: 2004–2006
- Genre: Crossover, electronic music, classical
- Label: EMI

Maksim Mrvica chronology
A New World (2005)	Electrik (2006)	Pure (2007)

Electrik is Maksim Mrvica's fourth album release. It was released on October 20, 2006.

== Track listing ==
=== Disc 1 ===
1. "The Gypsy Maid (from Il Trovatore)" (Giuseppe Verdi) – 3:40
2. "Requiem (from Requiem)" (Giuseppe Verdi) – 2:58
3. "Child in Paradise" (Tonči Huljić) – 4:22
4. "Anthem" (Tonči Huljić) – 4:11
5. "Hall of the Mountain King" (from Peer Gynt) (Edvard Grieg) – 4:16
6. "Nathrach" (Troy Donockley) – 4:18
7. "Beyond Rangoon/Waters of Irrawaddy (from the film Beyond Rangoon)" (Hans Zimmer) – 4:34
8. "March of the Icons" (Tonči Huljić) – 3:56
9. "Tango in Ebony" (Tonči Huljić) – 3:57
10. "Carmen Entr'acte (from Carmen)" (Georges Bizet) – 3:39
11. "Prelude in C (from Prelude and Fugue in C Minor)" (Johann Sebastian Bach) – 3:54
12. "In Paradisum (from Requiem)" (Gabriel Fauré) – 5:43
13. "The Way Old Friends Do" (ABBA) – 4:31

=== Disc 2 ===
1. "The Gypsy Maid - Club Remix" – 6:51
2. "Prelude in C - Club Remix" – 4:12
3. "Requiem - Breaks Remix" – 6:16
4. "Child in Paradise - Co-Fusion Remix" – 5:21
