= Greatest Maksim =

Studio album by Maksim Mrvica
- Released: 23 March 2008
- Recorded: 2008
- Genre: Crossover, classical
- Label: EMI

Greatest Maksim is the eighth studio album by Maksim Mrvica. EMI released the album on 23 March 2008.

== Track listing ==
1. "New World Concerto" (Antonín Dvořák)
2. "Wonderland" (Tonči Huljić)
3. "Merry Christmas Mr. Lawrence" (Sakamoto / Matt Dunkley)
4. "Croatian Rhapsody" (Tonči Huljić)
5. "Kolibre" (Tonči Huljić)
6. "Chopin's Revolutionary Etude in C Minor" (Chopin)
7. "Nocturne in E flat major Op.9, No.2" (Chopin / Tolga Kashif)
8. "Nostradamus" (Tonči Huljić)
9. "Piano Concerto No.1 in B flat minor, 3rd movement" (Tchaikovsky / Matt Dunkley)
10. "Totentanz" (Franz Liszt / Matt Dunkley)
11. "Nocturne no.20 in C Sharp Minor" (Chopin)
12. "Child in Paradise" (Tonči Huljić / arr. Eduard Botric)
13. "Requiem" (Giuseppe Verdi / arr. Julian Kershaw)
14. "Flight of the Bumblebee" (Rimsky-Korsakov)
15. "Bohemian Rhapsody" (Freddie Mercury / Tolga Kashif)
16. "The Gypsy Maid" (Giuseppe Verdi / arr. Matt Robertson)
17. "Greig's Concerto in A Minor" (Greig / arr. Ian Wherry)
18. "Somewhere In Time" / "The Old Woman" (John Barry)
