= Electric City =

Electric City may refer to:

== Places ==
- Electric City, Washington, U.S.
- Anderson, South Carolina, U.S., nicknamed Electric City
- New France, Digby County, Nova Scotia, Canada, nicknamed Electric City
- Schenectady, New York, U.S., nicknamed Electric City
- Scranton, Pennsylvania, U.S., nicknamed Electric City
  - Electric City Trolley Museum, a Scranton trolley museum
- Kaukauna, Wisconsin, U.S., nicknamed Electric City
- Peterborough, Ontario, Canada, nicknamed Electric City
- Great Falls, Montana, U.S., nicknamed Electric City
- Brora, Sutherland, Scotland, nicknamed the Electric City

== Media ==
- Electric City (web series), a 2012 web series published online by Yahoo
- Electric City of Music Instructor
- "Electric City" (song), by the Black Eyed Peas
- "Electric City" (The Big O episode)

== Other ==
- Electric City FC, a Canadian soccer team located in Peterborough, Ontario

== See also ==
- Electricity (disambiguation)
- Electric (disambiguation)
- City Electric
- Electric Town
