= Izbirljivo i slučajno =

Studio album by Matija Cvek
- Released: 16 April 2021
- Recorded: 2018–2021
- Genre: Jazz
- Length: 34:43
- Label: Menart Records

Matija Cvek chronology
Izbirljivo i slučajno (2021)	Vile se ovdje igraju (2023)

Singles from Izbirljivo i slučajno
- 1. "Visine" Released: 2021; 2. "Ptice" Released: 2021

Izbirljivo i slučajno is the debut studio album by Croatian singer-songwriter Matija Cvek. It was released on 16 April 2021 through Menart. A predominantly pop record, the album featured 11 songs.

The album was preceded by the single "Visine" which was released in June 2018 and propelled Cvek's status higher. "Ptice" was also released as the album's lead single in 2018. To promote the album and its songs, Cvek gave several gigs and concerts during which he performed its songs live; this included a mini tour which visited Zagreb, Osijek, Čakovec and Split. On 2 December 2022, he released a live album Izbirljivo i namjerno featuring Big Band Bjelovar.

== Background ==
Following his rise to prominence in the world of music through performances on HRT's A Strana and performances at Croatian local restaurants, terraces and cafés, Cvek began working on an upcoming studio album. Work on Izbirljivo i slučajno lasted for three years. The album was released on 16 April 2021 through Menart Records. In addition to nine new songs, the album contains two collaborations including "Nasloni se" featuring Matija Dediċ and "Probudi se" featuring Saša and Mladen from the band TBF. Speaking about his decision to include them on the album, Cvek revealed in an interview with T-portal that it was a "natural choice" and the two led to significant improvements to the song by "raising them to new levels and weaving magic into them".

In retrospect, Cvek revealed that he saw his first album as more single-based and thus, less of a whole conceptual artistic work.

== Promotion ==
In June 2018, Cvek released his major label debut single "Visine", written by himself. The single led to a gain in popularity. He worked on the music for the song together with Mislav Žabarović and initially played it only during his live gigs; as he noticed that people from the audience knew the lyrics more and more with each performance, he decided to record the song.

The album and its songs were promoted through a mini tour in Zagreb, Osijek, Čakovec and Split. On 2 December 2022, Cvek further released a live album titled Izbirljivo i namjerno featuring Big Band Bjelovar. The album contains live performances of eight of the album's songs during a concert in Bjelovar together with the band.

In further promotion of the album, Cvek gave several live performances during his televised appearances. On 3 March 2023, he appeared on HRT's talk show 5.com s Danielom where he performed "Probudi se" and "Visine".

== Reception ==
=== Critical reception ===
Cvek received an award at the 68th Zagreb Festival for his live performance of the album's "Ptice". The album's songs brought Cvek nominations at the Porin Awards.

=== Chart performance ===
The album debuted atop the Croatian Top of the Shops albums chart for the week ending 5 April 2021.

== Track listing ==
Izbirljivo i slučajno – Standard edition
No.	Title	Length
1.	"Drama"	3:16
2.	"Volim"	2:46
3.	"Blizu (69)"	3:27
4.	"Plaža"	3:30
5.	"Nasloni se" (featuring Matija Dedić)	3:15
6.	"Džejms Bond"	3:11
7.	"Ptice"	3:36
8.	"Probudi se" (featuring Saša and Mladen of TBF)	3:44
9.	"Praviš me ludim"	3:17
10.	"Visine"	3:39
11.	"Generacija"	4:04
Total length:		37:51

== Charts ==
Chart performance for Izbirljivo i slučajno
Chart (2021)	Peak position
Croatian Domestic Albums (HDU)	1
