= Minea (singer) =

- Born: Renata Končić; 17 September 1977 (age 48); Zagreb, SR Croatia, SFR Yugoslavia
- Origin: Croatia
- Genres: Pop, folk-pop, dance-pop
- Occupations: Singer, TV host
- Instrument: Vocals
- Years active: 1995–present
- Labels: CroRec, Tonika

Renata Končić (born 17 September 1977), known professionally by her stage name Minea, is a Croatian pop singer and television presenter.

== Early life ==
Končić was born in Zagreb, where her career is based. She performed the song Good Boy for the Croatian Eurovision song contest in 1995, which finished in 8th place. She recorded 7 albums from 1995 to 2003 which amassed her commercial acclaim in Croatia. Her discography features production by musicians Tonči Huljić and Branimir Mihaljević. In more recent years she began a career as a television host and personality, appearing in the first season of Tvoje lice zvuči poznato, and hosting the IN magazin show alongside media personality Dalibor Petko.

== Discography ==
=== Albums ===
- Vrapci i komarci (1995)
- E, pa neka (1997)
- Mimo zakona (2000)
- Kad smo... ono, znaš (2001)
- Sve u četiri oka (2004)
- Good boy (1995)
- Sve najbolje (2003)

=== Compilations ===
- Sve najbolje (2003)
