= Hana Huljić =

Dalmatian singer, composer and songwriter

- Born: 28 December 1990 (age 35); Split, Croatia, SFR Yugoslavia
- Education: Arts Academy in Split
- Occupations: Songwriter; composer; musician; singer
- Years active: 2013–present
- Spouse: Petar Grašo
- Children: 2
- Parents: Tonči Huljić (father); Vjekoslava Tolić (mother)

Hana Huljić (born 28 December 1990) is a Dalmatian composer and singer from the city of Split. Born and raised in her hometown, she decided to pursue a music career at the Arts Academy in Split in composition and music theory, finishing a Master's in those fields. She first rose to fame as an actress in the musical Stella in 2013. She then also debuted in music as a featured artist on Petar Grašo's "Srce za vodiča", released on 6 April 2016.

In 2019, she released her first co-authored song "Alisa" in both Croatian and English. She also served as a backing vocal for pianist Maksim Mrvica's tour across China and for her father Tonči's band Tonči i Madre Badessa. She was also part of the drafting and performance of his first sacral pop concert, for which she wrote and sang the third part of the mass together with the female choir.

== Early years ==
Hana Huljić was born on 28 December 1990 in Split, Croatia, to father Tonči Huljić, a musician, producer and composer and Vjekoslava Huljić, a lyricist, songwriter and writer. She has an older brother, songwriter and producer Ivan Huljić. Hana decided to pursue a music career at the Arts Academy in Split in composition and music theory, finishing a Master's in those fields.

== Career ==
=== 2013-16: acting debut and first single ===
In 2013, Hana appeared to the Croatian public for the first time as an actress in the musical Stella. For the purpose of the musical, she performed a cover of Magazin's hit song "Suze biserne" together with musician Vanda Winter.

She first debuted as a singer together with Petar Grašo on the song "Srce za vodiča" ("Heart as a Guide") which was released on 6 April 2016. When Grašo first introduced the idea of recording a song together with his daughter, Tonči was reluctant as he did not want the public to think that he is pushing his daughter into music the way he chose to build a career in that field. In addition to the vocals she provided to the song, Hana also appeared in the music video in the role of an angel. To further promote the song, they performed it love together on narodni's Day of Best Home Music on 27 January 2017.

=== 2016-23: Hana Who and original material ===
Besides that, she also appeared on her father's concerts. To promote her work in music, she made several televised appearances, including Speed date on newspaper Jutarnji list on 19 April 2019 and Zagrebe, dobro jutro. On 28 December 2019, she performed the song "Ovaj grad" live at TV show Kod nas Doma broadcast on Hrvatska radiotelevizija together with singer Mia Dimšić.

=== 2023-26: children lullabies ===
She gained popularity through her six children lullabies "Spavaj, spavaj", "Tiho, tiho", "Gugu gaga", "Palačinke", "Mali rak", "Uskrsna pjesma (Aleluja)" and "Morska medvjedica". "Palačinke" was written by Vjekoslava and Hana, with the former bringing up the idea before the latter composing it on the piano. It also features Hana's vocals which were recorded spontaneously after she had stolen her mother's telephone and sang a part of it on her dictaphone.

In 2024, she released the English song "Moon" along with a music video. This marked her sixth original song and it was written two years before its release. On 2 January, she appeared on the Hrvatska radiotelevizija program Zvjezdana prašina where she discussed how when writing songs, she first has the lyrics in English due to the Anglo-Saxon sound typical of her work. The revision of her grammar was done by her friend Mia Dimšić. On 11 June 2024, Hana appeared again on Zvjezdana prašina where she discussed the difficulty of organizing life as a new mother. She then proceeded to discuss how pieces of advice from other people sometimes did not apply to her own child, how there were days when she questioned herself whether she took care of her child well enough. She then promoted her new song and concert Pop Mediterranean Mass together with her father on 16 June 2024. She repeated her mother's words "regardless of whether you are a believer, or not, come and listen to the music". She ended up the interview discussing the media attention her and her husband were getting and how she tried to ward herself off from the overexposure.

She also wrote another lullaby for the children company Becutan, titled "Nježni i slatki snovi uz Becutan". The song was released on 29 October 2025 and featured an animated video and a brief sentence uttered by her daughter towards the end.

== Private life ==
Hana is married to singer Petar Grašo, whom she has a daughter Hana and a son Toni with. The two started dating in the summer of 2021. She shared how she gained much bigger inner peace since the birth of the two and that they helped her pay less attention to public opinion. She also shared how her and Grašo's family were of big help in the challenges that came with raising the two children.

During an interview with Hype TV on 31 October 2025, Hana shared how she never found it pleasant that she was part of a public family and that she tried to avoid that fact. She also revealed how as a grown-up, she tries to work at several fronts, writing orchestrations in parallel with writing lullabies. She said how her most important aspect of her work is creating and composing.

Her first long-term relationship was to pianist Tomislav Šošić, with whom they were together for seven years.

In her free time, Hana also paints and writes. She credits the people in her immediate surrounding as the biggest inspiration in her work. She revealed during an interview that she listens David Bowie, Annie Lenox, Aerosmith and Robbie Williams and that she went to concerts by the latter two.
