= Matija Cvek =

Croatian singer and songwriter

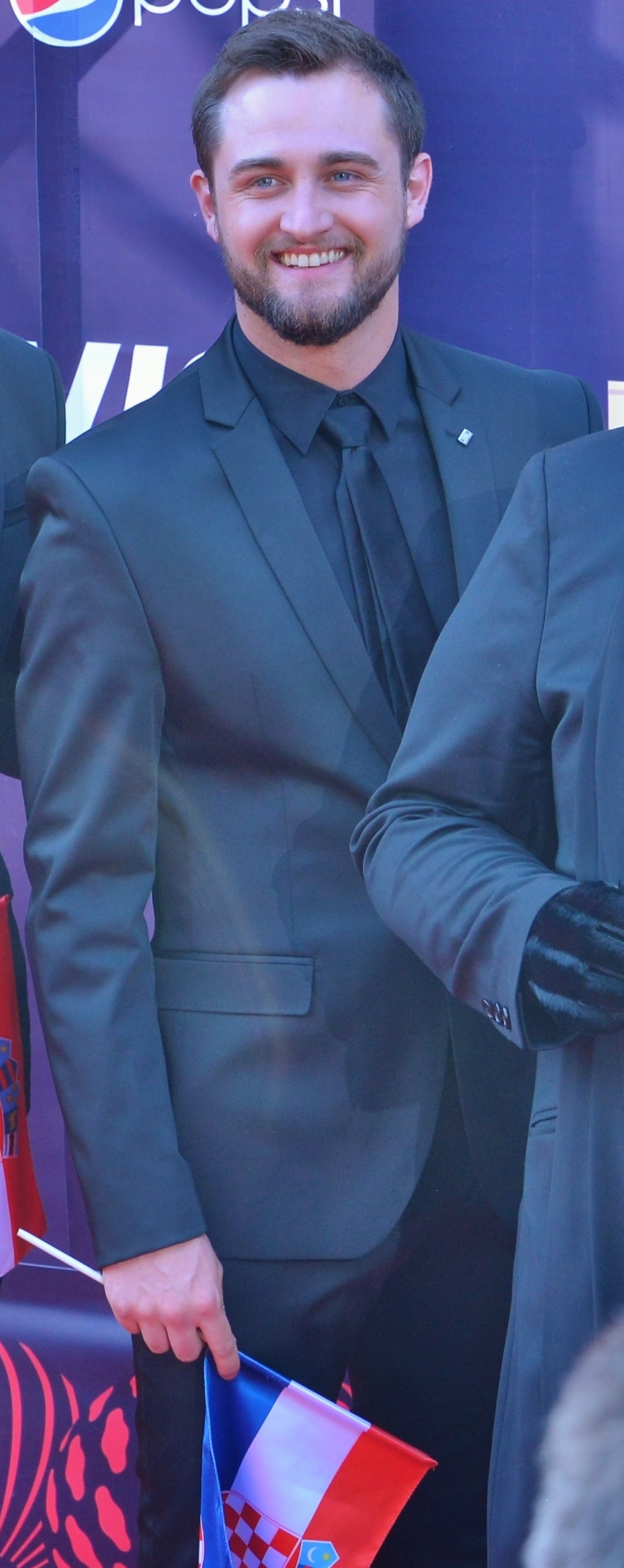
- Cvek in 2017
- Born: 9 March 1993 (age 33); Zagreb, Croatia
- Occupations: singer; songwriter; prodducer
- Years active: 2014–present
- Spouse: Miriam Cikron
- Children: 1
- Awards: Porin Award
- Website: https://matijacvek.hr/

Matija Cvek (born 9 March 1993) is a Croatian singer and songwriter. He rose to fame by participating in HRT's show A strana and as a backing vocalist during Jacques Houdek's Eurovision Song Contest 2017 performance of "My Friend". He first gained public attention in 2018 when he released his song "Visine". Cvek's first studio album, Izbirljivo i namjerno (2021), debuted atop the Croatian Albums Chart. His second studio album Vile se ovdje igraju (2023) also peaked at number one on the chart.

In addition to his solo material, Cvek has collaborated with Croatian singer Jelena Rozga on the rework of "Zar je ljubav spala na to" (2022) and with Serbian singer Marija Šerifović on the song "Pola sunca" (2023).

== Life and career ==
=== 1991-2017: Early life ===
Matija Cvek is born and raised in Zagreb, Croatia. He has one sister. He is in a close relationship with his grandfather and grandmother, Maja, a renowned Croatian lyricist. It was the latter who inspired him to venture into the music industry. While reading her works in a collection, he recorded a song based on one of her poems, titled, "Potraži me u jeseni" (English: Look for Me in the Autumn). He read the song and quickly turned it into a song on his guitar.

His love towards music and singing was first noticed by his aunt who encouraged him in kindergarten to sing in front of others, initially accompanied and later alone during child's plays. He formed his first band when he was 16; he credits this time as the period when he started falling in love towards live performances. At the period he also watched several bands perform, including Živa legenda. At the age of 18, he started singing classes with the professor Denis Vasilj, whom she credits for "raising [him] musically". During the time, he also met Neno Ninčević who became an author for his songs and a collaborator. For two days, he also signed up at the music school where he was taking part of the violoncello classes before switching to sports.

As part of his higher education, he started studying physiotherapy.

=== 2017-2021: Career beginnings and Izbirljivo i slučajno (2021) ===
Cvek's career started emerging through his live performances at local cafés, terraces and restaurants; initially his plan was not to build a career, though he enjoyed the process of "giving [himself] to people" and conveying his emotions. Cvek performed at the Eurovision Song Contest 2017 as a backing vocalist for Jacques Houdek's song "My Friend". After his appearance at the Eurovisiong Song Contest he started participating regularly at various festivals and gigs. He rose to fame by participating in HRT's show A strana. In the show, he managed to collaborate with several popular Croatian artists, including Nina Badrić. He also served as a backing vocal at the Volim Hrvatsku show.

In June 2018, Cvek released his major label debut single "Visine", written by Cvek. The single led to a gain in popularity. He worked on the music for the song together with Mislav Žabarović and initially played it only during his live gigs; as he noticed that people from the audience knew the lyrics more and more with each performance, he decided to record the song. On 11 March 2021, during a live performance at bravo!'s living room acoustic, Matija Cvek sang an acoustic version of Magazin's "Suze Biserne". He later also added it to the set list of his live performances, which is how he caught Jelena Rozga's attention. His version of the song was described as "something completely different" and was well-received by listeners.

Cvek released his debut studio album Izbirljivo i slučajno on 16 April 2021 and debuted atop the Croatian Top of the Shops albums chart. In retrospect, Cvek revealed that he saw his first album as more single-based and thus, less of a whole conceptual artistic work. On 26 November 2021, he appeared on then-narodni radio's Christmas living room acoustic where he performed "Last Christmas". On 9 December 2021, he appeared on Antena Zagreb where he performed a mashup of "All I Want for Christmas Is You" by Mariah Carey and "Sretan Božić" by Dino Dvornik. His first live album Izbirljivo i namjerno, which featured performances of eight of the album's songs, featured Big Band Bjelovar led by conductor Bruno Bišċan and was released on 2 December 2022.

=== 2022-2023: "Trebaš li me", non-album singles and Vile se ovdje igraju ===
In early 2022, a collaboration with Croatian singer Eni Jurišić titled "Trebaš li me" was released. The track reached number one on the HR Top 40 becoming Cvek's first chart topper. At the 29th Annual Porin Awards, Cvek took home two awards: the award for Best Pop Album and the award for Best Male Vocal Performance. At the 2023 edition of the Cesarica Awards, Cvek won the Song of The Year award with "Trebaš li me". The song received two additional Songs of The Year awards at the 2023 editions of Zlatni Studio and Top.HR Music Awards, respectively.

On 3 March 2023, Cvek was a guest on the talk show 5.com s Danielom on HRT together with Mario Mihaljević. In addition to an interview about his two studio albums and career, he performed the songs "Trebaš li me", "Probudi se" and "Visine". On 14 March 2023, Cvek released the song "Kraj Save" together with the Funkensteins. The song had been on his and the Funkensteins repertoire for over a year and a music video for it was filmed at the Dom Sportova complex in Zagreb, Croatia. The song was recorded as an hommage to his hometown of Zagreb. Upon its release, it received a very positive review from a writer of Story.hr who called it a "wonderful ballad". On 25 June 2023, Cvek participated at the Melodije Jadrana 2023 with the song "Zalazak" which features the Funkensteins.

On 15 September 2023, he released his second studio album with his band the Funkensteins, titled Vile se ovdje igraju (English: Fairies are playing here). The title was borrowed from a sign Cvek saw during his vacation at the Japanese islands at Bihać which he used to write a song and a chorus. The album was recorded in a "vintage fashion", as described by the singer himself; it included ten days of recording with 15-hour recording sessions per day. During an interview he spoke more in-depth about the album, revealing that it was the creative outcome of his introspection, "digging deeper" into his own thoughts and feelings. He further said that his discussions on love are "more intimate, more personal, maybe even sensual and sexual". The album also makes mention of his lifepath and it finds him singing from a state of limbo, sharing his thoughts on life and death. Sonically, the album is different from his previous work which according to Cvek might have surprised some of his listeners.

At the 2023 Porin Awards, he was nominated in seven categories, including Song of the Year, Best Vocal Collaboration and Best Clip for "Trebaš li me", Best Pop Music Album for Izbirljivo i namjerno together with Big Band Bjelovar, Best Male Vocal Performance for "Visine", Best Group Vocal Performance for "Ne moram ni ja" with the Funkensteins, for which Ivan Pešut was also nominated for Producer of the Year.

=== 2023-present: Career in Serbia ===
On 6 October 2023, he collaborated with Serbian singer Marija Šerifović on the song "Pola sunca" taken from the latter's sixth studio album Dolazi ljubav. They further promoted it through a music video directed by Hamper Digital and released on 6 October 2023 and making a televised appearances on the Serbian show Kec na jedanaest. As of April 2024, the music video has over 9.4 million views on the platform, 5 months since its release. The single was very commercially successful, peaking at number three on Billboard's Croatia Songs for the week ending 21 October 2023.

Cvek's debut live performance in Belgrade, Serbia took place during Jelena Rozga's concert, where he served as a guest performer for the song "Zar je ljubav spala na to" on 7 April 2023 as part of the latter's Minut Srca Mog Tour (2022-23). As part of a promotion for the concert, he made two guest appearances on the shows Medu nama and Kec na jedanaest on 6 and 7 April 2023, respectively, where he gave interviews. On the latter show, he performed three of his songs, including "Trebaš li me", "Ptice" and a cover of Željko Joksimović's "Leđa o leđa". He later gave a smaller gig, performing together with his band at a café in Belgrade on 7 June 2023. On 25 November 2023, Cvek gave his first solo concert in Belgrade at the Belgrade Youth Center. Serbian pop singer Dušan Svilar served as his opening act.

On 10 February 2025 Matija Cvek performed a cover of "End of Beginning" together with Croatian singer Jakov Jozinović as part of a series of covers he recorded in the kitchen. Their version of the song went viral. On 21 November 2025, Jakov released his first single, titled "Polje ruža" whose music and lyrics were written by Matija Cvek.

== Personal life ==
Cvek was in a relationship with Croatian singer-songwriter Nika Turković. During an interview, he revealed that prior to finding his call in music, he briefly ventured in building a career in football. Nevertheless, due to an injury he was obliged to stop at the age of 18. Cvek revealed that he spends most of his free time together with family members and friends as relationships to others are the most important to him. He also enjoys spending time in nature and taking walks in forests, buying and collecting sneakers, cooking and seldom playing video games on a PlayStation console. During his walks, he often wanders through the mountain of Medvednica.

During a brief interview, Cvek has revealed that he loves other people and enjoys hospitality as he has experienced it in Belgrade. He has also revealed that despite his rise to fame, he can also see himself as a "band singer". During the transitioning towards building a career in music, he experienced heightened stress and anxiety which he tried to counted by spending time in nature and being among other people, including childhood friends. Cvek has a rather casual dressing style with which he tried to emulate his look while onstage; this often includes sneakers and a bomber jacket. He also has two minor tattoos. Cvek is friends with Croatian composer and lyricist Ivan Huljić with whom he often celebrates his birthday. He has a fear of flying with airplanes.

On 23 July 2024, Matija Cvek married Miriam Cikron at Basilica of Saint Anthony of Padua, Zagreb at Črnomerec. Little was known about his wife, except that she was a Faculty of Food Technology and Biotechnology student, one of the illustrators of Cvek's new album and an actress in the music video for the song "Nemam ništa protiv" by Divlje Jagode. In February 2024, the two received daughter Lota.

== Artistry ==
Reflecting on his songwriting process, Cvek revealed that he writes songs best while walking and then recording everything he has come up with on his phone; most often he comes up with the lyrics first and then music, although his favorite writing moment is when both come together. He revealed that writing turned into his love as he would write every morning when waking up. In the years of his musical exploration, Cvek realized that he fits in the genres groove and pop-funk. He has performed with his band for longer than 5 years, which has led to them labelling each other as "a small family".

Discussing his artistry and early influences in his career, Cvek revealed how he was influenced by Neno Ninčević, Ante Gelo whom he worked with on the show Volim Hrvatsku and Runjićeve večeri, Jacques Houdek whom he learnt the importance of the first tone and the stance onstage from and Nikša Bratoš who helped him during A Strana. Most of the lyrics in his songs revolve around the topic of love; he revealed that as an aspiring singer, Oliver Dragojević's songs served as the "ABC" of singing for him and other artists as well.

In addition to his career in music, Cvek has expressed his wishes to venture in literature through poem collections, books and novels. He enjoys reading books on music theory and using similes and metaphors.

== Discography ==
=== Studio albums ===
- Izbirljivo i namjerno (2021)
- Vile se ovdje igraju (2023)

== Awards and nominations ==
Year	Association	Category	Nominee / work	Result	Ref.
2022	Cesarica	Song of the Year	"Ptice"	Nominated	
2022	Cesarica	Song of the Year	"Zaplesala je s ljetom"	Nominated	
2022	Porin	Best Pop Album	Izbirljivo i namjerno	Won	
2022	Porin	Best Male Vocal Performance	Matija Cvek	Won	
2023	Cesarica	Song of the Year	"Trebaš li me"	Won	
2023	Zlatni Studio	Song of the Year	"Trebaš li me"	Won	
2023	Top.HR Music Awards	Song of the Year	"Trebaš li me"	Won	
2024	Porin	Best Pop Album	Vile se ovdje igraju	Won	
