= Electricity: OMD with the Royal Liverpool Philharmonic Orchestra =

2009 concert film by Orchestral Manoeuvres in the Dark

Video by Orchestral Manoeuvres in the Dark with the Royal Liverpool Philharmonic Orchestra
- Released: 14 December 2009
- Recorded: 20 June 2009
- Venue: Philharmonic Hall (Liverpool)
- Label: FACT
- Director: Hambi Haralambous

Electricity: OMD with the Royal Liverpool Philharmonic Orchestra is a concert film by Orchestral Manoeuvres in the Dark (OMD) with the Royal Liverpool Philharmonic Orchestra. The concert was recorded on 20 June 2009 at the Philharmonic Hall in Liverpool. The DVD was released on 14 December 2009.

The concert featured the orchestral premiere of "The Energy Suite", followed by a selection of OMD songs with orchestral backing fronted by Andy McCluskey and Paul Humphreys. The music was arranged for the orchestra by Gary Carpenter, Ian Stephens, Deborah Mollison, Louis Johnson, and Ian Gardiner. The orchestra was conducted by Clark Rundell.

== The Energy Suite ==
"The Energy Suite" is an installation project created by artist Peter Saville, OMD member Andy McCluskey and filmmaker Hambi Haralambous. It is made of visual and audible art, displaying film footage that captures the architecture and sounds of five power stations in England and Wales. It was on display at FACT in Liverpool, from 12 December 2008 until 22 February 2009.

The power stations featured are:

- Gas: Point of Ayr Gas Terminal and Connah's Quay Power Station
- Water: Dinorwig Hydro-Electric Power Station (Electric Mountain)
- Air: North Hoyle Bank Wind Turbine Farm
- Nuclear: Heysham Nuclear Power Site
- Coal: Fiddler's Ferry Coal Fired Power Station

== Track listing ==
Disc one
No.	Title	Writer(s)	Length
1.	"Radio Prague"	n/a
2.	"Messages"	Andy McCluskey, Paul Humphreys
3.	"Souvenir"	Humphreys, Martin Cooper
4.	"Joan of Arc"	McCluskey
5.	"Joan of Arc (Maid of Orleans)"	McCluskey
6.	"All That Glitters"	McCluskey, Stuart Kershaw, Lloyd Massett
7.	"La Femme Accident"	OMD
8.	"Talking Loud and Clear"	OMD
9.	"Dream of Me (Based on Love's Theme)"	McCluskey, Barry White
10.	"Walking on the Milky Way"	McCluskey, Nigel Ipinson, Keith Small
11.	"The Native Daughters of the Golden West"	OMD
12.	"Sailing on the Seven Seas"	McCluskey, Kershaw
13.	"Enola Gay"	McCluskey
14.	"Electricity"	McCluskey, Humphreys
15.	"The Romance of the Telescope"	OMD

Disc two: The Energy Suite
No.	Title	Writer(s)	Length
1.	"Gas"	McCluskey
2.	"Water"	McCluskey
3.	"Air"	McCluskey
4.	"Nuclear"	McCluskey, Kershaw
5.	"Coal"	McCluskey, Kershaw
6.	"The Making of 'The Energy Suite'" (Documentary)
