= Pola sunca =

Single by Marija Šerifović featuring Matija Cvek

from the album Dolazi ljubav
- Released: 6 October 2023
- Recorded: 2023
- Genre: Pop
- Length: 3:22
- Label: Panda Records

Marija Šerifović singles chronology
"Dobar Vam dan" (2022)	"Pola sunca" (2023)

Matija Cvek singles chronology
"Zalazak" (2023)	"Pola sunca" (2023)	"Nudim ti se" (2024)

Music video
- "Pola sunca" on YouTube

"Pola sunca" is a song by Serbian singer Marija Šerifović taken from her sixth studio album Dolazi ljubav (2023). The song was written by Bane Opačić, produced by Dušan Alagić and the arrangement was finalized by Alagić and Dušan Krsmanović. Croatian singer Matija Cvek serves as a featured artist. It was released as a single on 6 October 2023. Upon its release, it was met with very positive reviews from listeners, some of whom compared Cvek's vocal performance to that of Toše Proeski. It was also commercially successful, peaking at number 3 on the Croatia Songs chart by Billboard.

A music video for the song was directed by Hamper Digital and released on 6 October 2023. It features the duo singing the song, Cvek dressed in white and Šerifović in black. The video quickly became trending and garnered over 1 million views in 2 days on the video-streaming platform YouTube. To further promote the song, each artist spoke about it during their televised appearances on the show Kec na jedanaest.

== Background ==
In late 2023, Matija Cvek was contacted by Serbian singer Marija Šerifović to collaborate with her on a song. After careful consideration, the two decided to record the song "Pola sunca" taken from the latter's sixth studio album Dolazi ljubav (2023) as a collaboration. The decision to work together came after Šerifović contacted Cvek on the phone demanding that they meet up. He then travelled to Belgrade where the two met up; following a brief performance of the song by Šerifović and a brief review of each other's repertoire, they decided to proceed with recording the "demanding" song. Cvek found the lyrics to be relatable, its balladry to be reminiscent of the "big Balkan ballads" that harken back to his childhood. He also expressed his hopes that the song would "open doors" for him for a career path in Serbia.

While singing the song, both listeners and Cvek's fans noted the similarities in his vocal performance to that of Macedonian singer Toše Proeski which he himself, also acknowledged during an interview and cited it as a possible influence to being exposed to his music.

== Promotion ==
=== Music video ===
An accompanying music video directed by Hamper Digital was released on 6 October 2023. The clip featured around 40 people on set and Cvek revealed how the atmosphere could be "demanding" but very professional. At the time of filming, he also saw the role he was playing in the video as "challenging". For the clip, Cvek appears dressed in a white Marko Feher suit. Throughout, Šerifović is seen dressed in a black suit and both are seen singing the song looking at the camera. Additionally, one shot of the video features a naked Cvek who is shown from the back with wax and two candles on his skin. The music video was very popular on the video streaming platform YouTube where it garnered over 1 million views in two days. As of April 2024, the music video has over 9.4 million views on the platform, 5 months since its release.

=== Televised appearances ===
The duo, separately, made televised appearances on the Serbian show Kec na jedanaest; Šerifović made an appearance on 15 October 2023 while Cvek made an appearance on 24 November 2023. When speaking about the decision on Cvek, Šerifović said that she was looking for the qualities "fresh, honest, valuable and of high quality" to mix with her own love for music, to which Cvek came as a "logical choice".

== Live performance ==
The duo appeared together to perform the song at Sava Centar on 7 May 2025 during Marija Šerifović's concert.

== Chart performance ==
The single was very commercially successful, peaking at number one in both Croatia and Serbia; discussing his views on the fact that the song, which was slightly different from other trending songs found its way among the audience, Cvek described it as "atypical" and something that caught him by surprise.

The single was very commercially successful, peaking at number three on Billboard's Croatia Songs for the week ending 21 October 2023. The following week, it moved to the position of number four.

== Charts ==
Chart performance for "Pola sunca"
Chart (2023)	Peak position
Croatia (Billboard)	3

== Credits ==
Credits are adapted from the description of the music video on YouTube.

Song credits

- Music by: Bane Opačić
- Lyrics by: Bane Opačić
- Arranged by: Dušan Alagić, Dušan Krsmanović
- Produced by: Dušan Alagić
- Drums: Mladen Dragović
- Keys / Guitars / Programming / Violin: Dušan Alagić
- Programming, keys: Dušan Krsmanović
- Recorded, mixed and mastered: Strahinja Đurić for Late Night Studio Belgrade, 2023.

Video credits

- Production: Hamper Digital
- Executive production: Qlaack
- Art director & Director: Miloš Šarović
- Director of Photography: Marko Kažić
- Production design: Miloš Radovanović
- Costume designer: Marko Feher
- 1st AD: Sara Vulović
- Producer: Dušan Mladenović / Qlaack
- Production manager: Ana Mesaroš / Qlaack
- PA: Sofija Šokčić / Qlaack
- Editor: Matija Novaković
- Color Grade: Goran Todorić
- VFX: Merlin Studio
- Graphic design: Haris Jusović
- Photographer: Miomir Milić
- Ass. Costume designer: Marko Čvorović
- MUA: Nataša Micović
- Hairdresser: Stefan Panovski
- Gaffer: Miloš Vučenović
- Key Grip: Dragan Gagi Jović
- Steadicam: Petar Stojanović
- 1st AC: Marko Jokić
- SFX: MagicEffect
- Playback: TonMaster
