= Maksim Mrvica =

Croatian pianist

- Born: 3 May 1975 (age 51); Šibenik, SR Croatia, SFR Yugoslavia
- Origin: Šibenik, Croatia
- Genres: Classical crossover, Classical
- Occupation: Pianist
- Instrument: Piano
- Label: Lisinski Studios / EMI Music

Maksim Mrvica (pronounced [mâksim mr̩̂ʋitsa]; born 3 May 1975) is a Croatian pianist. He plays classical crossover music.

== Biography ==
Mrvica was born in Šibenik, Croatia. He took piano lessons at the age of nine. Three years later he gave his first concert performance of Haydn's Piano Concerto in C major. When the Croatian war of independence started in 1991, both Mrvica and his professor were determined that this would not disrupt his music studies. In spite of the war and surrounding turbulence, Mrvica entered in, and won, his first major competition in Zagreb in 1993.

Mrvica went on to study at the Music Academy in Zagreb where he spent five years under Professor Vladimir Krpan, who himself was a pupil of Arturo Benedetti Michelangeli. He then spent a year at the Franz Liszt Academy of Music in Budapest and during this year he won first prize at the Nikolai Rubinstein International Piano Competition. In 2000, he moved to Paris to study with Igor Lazko and gained first prize in the Pontoise Piano Competition in 2001.

== International appeal ==
Mrvica was spotted by Tonči Huljić, who composed several tracks for the crossover string quartet, Bond, and introduced Mrvica to British impresario Mel Bush. EMI Classics was also interested in Mrvica and soon a new album was underway. This album was The Piano Player, which gave a new spin to compositions by Handel and Chopin. Since its release in 2003 it has been successful, in Asia, where it has achieved Gold status in Singapore, Malaysia, Indonesia and mainland China, Platinum in Taiwan and Croatia and Double Platinum in Hong Kong. It was also in the number 1 slot in the HMV international pop chart in Hong Kong for twelve consecutive weeks.

Under Mel Bush's management, Mrvica's performances generally take place against a backdrop of special lighting, stage and video effects.

Mrvica's piece "Exodus" was used as the floor music of Russian artistic gymnast Anna Pavlova in the 2008 Beijing Olympics.

== Adaptations and arrangements ==
There is a Chinese lyrical version added to the non-lyrical song of Maksim Mrvica's "Claudine". This musical piece was sung and written by singer Edmond Leung from Hong Kong. According to Boxup.com, Edmond was so captivated by Maksim's performance of "Claudine" that he asked Maksim's permission to do a lyrical version in Cantonese. Soon after in 2004, their collaboration produced the bittersweet ballad called "信望愛" (sun3 mong6 ngoi3) ("Trust Hope Love").

== Discography ==
=== Albums ===
List of albums, with selected chart positions
Title	Album details	Peak chart positions				Sales
Title	Album details	CRO (For.)	JPN	KOR	UK	Sales
Gestures	Released: 1999; Label: EMI	—	—	—	—	
The Piano Player	Released: 2003; Label: EMI	39	—	—	76	KOR: 20,751
Variations Part I & II	Released: 2004; Label: EMI	1	—	—	—	
A New World	Released: 2005; Label: EMI	3	—	—	—	
Electrik	Released: 2006; Label: EMI	22	50	—	—	
Pure	Released: 2007; Label: MBO	—	—	—	—	
Pure II	Released: 2008; Label: MBO	—	—	—	—	
Greatest Maksim	Released: 2008; Label: EMI	—	—	70	—	
Appassionata	Released: 2010; Label: Universal	—	—	23	—	KOR: 1,999
The Movies	Released: 2012; Label: Universal	—	—	17	—	KOR: 2,270
Mezzo e Mezzo	Released: 2014; Label: Universal	—	—	15	—	KOR: 3,289
Croatian Rhapsody	Released: 2015; Label: Universal	—	—	22	—	KOR: 1,952
New Silk Road	Released: 2018; Label: MBO	—	—	65	—	
