= Domenica Žuvela =

Domenica
- Born: Domenica Žuvela; 8 November 1992 (age 33); Vela Luka, Croatia
- Genres: Pop
- Occupation: Singer
- Instruments: Vocals, piano
- Years active: 2017–present
- Labels: Croatia Records, Tonika Records

Domenica Žuvela, also known as just Domenica (born 8 November 1992), is a Croatian singer who has been active since 2017.

== Life and career ==
Žuvela started her singing career as a backing singer for Tonči Huljić's music project Tonči Huljić & Madre Badessa Band. In early 2017 she announced her departure from the band. Her debut solo single "Kad sam s tobom" was released on 3 July 2017. The song was performed at the 57th Split Festival in Split, Croatia. "Vidi se iz aviona" was released as the second single, later becoming her first song to chart on the Croatian Singles Chart.

On 17 January 2019, Žuvela was announced as one of the 16 participants in Dora 2019, the national contest in Croatia to select the country's Eurovision Song Contest entry, with the song "Indigo." She performed tenth and finished 13th.

On 25 June 2023, Žuvela participated at Melodije Jadrana 2023 with the song "Jedna na sto".

== Private life ==
In November 2025, Domenica shared how she was in a 15-year long relationship with lawyer Ivan Bačić. The two of them went on a trip to Istanbul.

== Discography ==
=== Studio albums ===
Title	Details	Peak chart positions
Title	Details	CRO
Ćiribu ćiriba	Released: 2 December 2019; Formats: Digital download, CD; Label: Croatia Records	1

=== Singles ===
Title	Year	Peak chart positions	Album
Title	Year	CRO Airplay	Album
"Kad sam s tobom"	2017	—	Ćiribu ćiriba
"Vidi se iz aviona"	2017	15	Ćiribu ćiriba
"Ljubavna limunada"	2018	11	Ćiribu ćiriba
"Mi protiv nas" (with Damir Kedžo)	2018	2	Ćiribu ćiriba
"Baš, baš"	2018	8	Ćiribu ćiriba
"Indigo"	2019	8	Ćiribu ćiriba
"Ne vidim, ne čujem"	2019	22	Ćiribu ćiriba
"Nema te svit"	2019	—	Ćiribu ćiriba
"Ćiribu ćiriba"	2019	10	Ćiribu ćiriba
"Zovi"	2020	6	Non-album single
"Medenjak"	2020	3	Non-album single
"Control Freak"	2023	20	Non-album single
"Jedna na sto"	2023	30	Non-album single
"Prva ljubav, prva bol"	2024	13	Non-album single
"Navij na najjače"	2024	23	Non-album single
"Pravo lice"	2024	16	Non-album single
"Pinokio"	2026	45	Non-album single
"—" denotes releases that did not chart or were not released in that territory.

== Awards and nominations ==
Year	Association	Category	Nominee / work	Result	Ref.
2019	Cesarica	Song of the Year	Mi protiv nas (with Damir Kedžo)	Nominated	
2020	Porin	Best Parlour Album	Ćiribu ćiriba	Won	
