= Anđelo Jurkas =

Croatian writer and musician

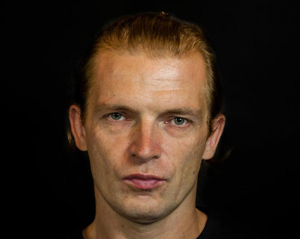
- Anđelo Jurkas (2012.)

Background information
- Born: October 4, 1976 (age 50); Koprivnica, Croatia, Yugoslavia
- Occupations: writer, director, music critic
- Years active: 1999–today

Angelo Jurkas is a Croatian writer, film director, publicist, novelist, essayist, lyricist and screenwriter. He has released two studio albums Soundtrack of Life (2011) and Off The Record (2012).

== Biography ==
Jurkas was born in Koprivnica, Croatia on 4 October 1976, which then belonged to Yugoslavia. He grew up and was brought up in the city of Đurđevac. He was educated in the city of Zagreb at the University of Zagreb in the field of law.

He has published six solo literary publications in the span of his career; Bez Rocka Trajanja/No Time Limits (Znanje, 2010), Soundtrack života/Soundtrack of Life (Znanje, 2011), Volim te/I Love You (Produkcija, 2012), Off The Record – stories from the brighter side (DOP Produkcija 2012), Veliki prasak: službena biografija 2 Cellos/A Big Bang: Official Biography by 2 Cellos (Menart 2013), Raspelo/The Crucifix (DOP Produkcija, 2014).

From 2000 to 2013, he worked as a journalist/editor in all types of media; ranging from radio stations, foreign and domestic press, including HTV, Večernji list, Heroina Nova, Ritam, Teen generacija, Klik, Vip.hr and Net.hr.

In 2003 he founded the marketing and promotion company DOP Production/DOP Produkcija, an independent firm consisting of:

- discographic label DOP Records (Ramirez, Svadbas, Lollobrigida, Dječaci, Quasarr, Pink Studio, Viva Glorio, Batida)
- booking and concert agency A1 Booking Agency (Rokaj fest 2008, Terraneo 2011 – The Fall, La Roux, Raveonettes), Mudhoney, Wedding Present, Future of the Left, The Fall, These New Puritans, Datsuns, Dwarves, Wire, Lemonheads, New Bomb Turks, Nashville Pussy, E Z Rollers, Dub Syndicate, Guitar Wolf, Cedell Davis and many others
- department specialized for video production – DOP Art

== Books ==
His first published book was called Bez Roka Trajanja/Without Time Limits and is a portrait of the Balkan region through the perspective of 200 most significant albums and artists of the territory.

The second one is also conceived as a combination of pop culture and popular self-help literature and it is called "Soundtrack of Life; self help with music“ – the selection of the 365 most relevant albums and artists as the perfect music for each and every day of the year.

Music album by the same name is meant to be soundtrack of the day. The album is made of 24 songs, each for every hour of the day

Third book was poetry collection I Love You, autobiographical story composed of love songs and beatnic street poetry. Retrieved 24 February 2011.

Fourth one was the book and the album named "Off The Record – stories from the brighter side“ detailing the collection of numerous accidents, funny events, short stories from the concerts, promotions and similar stuff regarding more than 300 most interesting bands from world rock scene from The Rolling Stones, Bruce Springsteen, Iggy Pop, Ramones, Rage Against The Machine, Guns And Roses, Metallica, Nirvana, Beastie Boys, Nick Cave, indie scene The Jesus Lizard, Jon Spencer Blues Explosion, Henry Rollins, Gang of Four, Godfathers, Fugazi, Shellac and the others such as Macy Gray, Sade, 50 Cent, Beyoncé, and many more.

Fifth solo title is "Big Bang: Official Biography of 2 Cellos“, as the title says the official biography of national crossover duo, two classical backgrounded cellists Luka Šulić and Stjepan Hauser, known as 2Cellos that became one hit wonders on the global music market with the cover of Michael Jackson's hit “Smooth Criminal“ played only on two cellos., Retrieved 26 November 2013.

He started literary program Pop Up library within which Dallas Records published biographies of artists Red Hot Chili Peppers, Adele, Nick Cave, The Doors and The Clash.

His work frequently touches upon music, pop culture, movies, media, etc., Retrieved 20 January 2011.

== Music ==
Along with his independent literary career, Jurkas also started his solo music works. He has released two solo studio albums, Soundtrack of Life (2011) and Off The Record (2012). For both albums, he collaborated with producer Hrvoje Marjanović Sett.

On 9 August 2021, during the COVID-19 pandemic, he interviewed songwriter and musician Hana Huljić during his Mixer podcast.

== Film ==
Jurkas played a movie role in I Love You, a feature-length film by Dalibor Matanić (2006). He also directed (along with Hladno pivo) Knjiga žalbe/Complaints Book, a short, special-purpose film. He also directed numerous TV features in the TV show Vip Music Club LP.

He acted and played in the music videos "Hirosima" by Urban & 4 (directed by Andrej Korovljev) and "Pravo ja" by Hladno Pivo (directed by Goran Kulenović) as well as a few more videos.

Together with director Goran Berović he recorded Vanishing a short movie with Leona Paraminski, one of the leading Croatian actresses, based upon a storytelling music piece from the album compilation The Crucifix.

== Bibliography ==
- Bez Roka Trajanja/Without Time Limits (Znanje 2010)
- Soundtrack of Life; selfhelp with the music (Znanje 2011)
- Off The Record – stories from the brighter side (DOP Produkcija, 2012)
- Big Bang: official biography of 2 Cellos (Menart, 2013)

== Discography ==
- Soundtrack of Life (2011)
- Off The Record (2012)

== Films ==
- I Love You (Dalibor Matanic, 2006)
- Hiroshima – Urban & 4 (Andrej Korovljev, 2009)
- Pravo ja – Hladno Pivo (Goran Kulenovic, 2013)
- Nestajanje / Vanishing (Goran Berović, 2013)
- Zbog tebe (Because of You) (Anđelo Jurkas, 2016)
- Fuck off I Love You (Anđelo Jurkas, 2017)
