= Petar Grašo =

Croatian pop singer and songwriter (born 1976)

- Born: 19 March 1976 (age 50); Split, SR Croatia, Yugoslavia
- Occupation: Singer
- Years active: 1995–present
- Spouse: Hana Huljić (m. 2022)
- Partner: Danijela Martinović (1997–2021)
- Children: 2
- Relatives: Tonči Huljić (father-in-law), Vjekoslava Huljić (mother-in-law)
- Website: https://petargraso.com/

Petar Grašo (born 19 March 1976) is a Croatian pop singer and songwriter. He was born and raised in the region of Dalmatia in the city of Split. Initially starting a career in basketball, Grašo switched to music after being pushed by fellow Dalmatian singer Oliver Dragojević.

In the course of his career, he has released three studio albums: Mjesec iznad oblaka (1997; Moon Over the Clouds), Utorak (1999; Tuesday) and Šporke riči (2003; Dirty Words). Following an eight year-long hiatus, he returned to music in 2011, when he worked on the album Ka Hashish together with Tonči Huljić & Madre Badessa Band.

He attained popularity in Croatia, Serbia, Bosnia and Herzegovina, Montenegro, Slovenia, and North Macedonia. As of 2022, he is married to Croatian musician Hana Huljić, with whom he has one daughter Alba and one son Toni. He has received numerous recognitions and awards for his music work including a Zlatni Studio Award.

== Life and career ==
=== 1976-1995: Early life and childhood ===
Born in Split on 19 March 1976, to professional basketball player Zoran Grašo and mother Snježana Grašo, Petar is the older of two siblings, with his sister being Buga Grašo Radošević. As a youngster, he first intended on being a basketball player following the footsteps of his father. After he gave a novice try at singing and playing the piano, and received approval by established singer Oliver Dragojević who was a friend of his parents', Grašo decided to take his singing to the next level. Growing up, he listened to international singers famous in the 1980s David Bowie, Michael Jackson, Billy Joel and Toto as well as Yugoslav artists Bijelo dugme, Oliver Mandić and Magazin.

=== 1995-2005: Mjesec iznad oblaka, songwriting, three studio albums ===
He rose to prominence as a songwriter when established singer Oliver Dragojević performed one of the first songs young Grašo had ever written, "Boginja", on the Dora contest in 1995, finishing second. Since then, he also wrote the song "Vrime Božje" which was included on the album Vrime (1995). He continued collaborating greatly with Dragojević, and has also worked with Doris Dragović, Danijela Martinović, Tonči Huljić, Goran Bregović, and Lepa Brena. For Dragović, he wrote the song "Da si tu" from her album Bakle Ivanjske (1995).

In 1996, he won the Zadarfest music festival in Zadar with his song "Trebam nekoga", which promulgated him to wide fame. At the same event, Dragojević won the jury's prize with the song "Gore si ti", written by Grašo.

On 18 August 1997, he releases his first studio album Mjesec iznad oblaka. The album was very commercially successful and it managed to sell over 60.000 copies three months after its release, for which it received a gold certification and later it also received a platinum certification for over 100.000 copies sold two years since its release. It is still considered to be the most sold album in the history of Croatian discography. He placed second in Dora 1997, Croatia's qualifying competition for Eurovision Song Contest 1997 with the song "Idi". He then starts his collaboration with Tonči Huljić and Vjekoslava Huljić on the song "Boli me" with which he won with at the Melodije Hrvatskog Jadrana and which appeared at number one on the Croatian singles chart. He performed at the festival a few more times, before he won again in 2000 with the song "Sve nas manje ima tu".

Grašo co-wrote the lyrics to the song "Metak sa posvetom" with Antonija Šola for Lepa Brena's 2011 album Začarani krug, and composed the music himself.

His songs "Volim i postojim" (1997) and "Ko nam brani?" (1999) are credited with helping the public cope with the COVID-19 pandemic.

In 2004, he recorded the song "Sta ti je sit" ("What Is the World"), written by the Huljić duo, composed by Remi Kazinoti and featuring Jelena Rozga; it served as the opening song for the first Croatian TV soap opera Villa Maria. An accompanying music video with the two singing in front of the piano while a crowd of young people dance at a wedding ceremony is also incorporated. Following that, he took a longer hiatus from the music industry as he felt used by the audience and suffered from a burnout.

=== 2019-present: Standalone singles and performances ===
Petar Grašo released "Srce za vodiča" ("Heart as a Guide") featuring a debut by Hana Huljić on 6 April 2016. When Grašo first introduced the idea of recording a song together with his daughter, Tonči was reluctant as he did not want the public to think that he is pushing his daughter into music the way he chose to build a career in that field. In addition to the vocals she provided to the song, Hana also appeared in the music video in the role of an angel. To further promote the song, they performed it love together on narodni's Day of Best Home Music on 27 January 2017.

At the end of 2017, Petar Grašo recorded the song "Ako te pitaju" written by the Huljić duo. A music video for the song produced by Pilot Studio and directed by Vojan Koceić was released on 11 December 2017. Speaking about it, Grašo revealed that he wanted to create a picture of a warm love story and capture the final lyrics "We only need to know how to love each other". The song was very successful on the Croatian Singles Chart, remaining at the top spot for several weeks, with which it cemented his status as one of the most famous Ex-Yu singers. The song further received the award for Public Hit of the Year Award - Cesarica in the awards ceremony in 2019.

On 10 November 2019, Grašo performed a medley together with singer Nina Badrić and Ante Gelo Band at the Zlatni Studio 2019 Awards. The medley consisted of the songs "Rekao si", "Trebam nekoga", "Čarobno jutro" and "Ako te pitaju". On 27 December 2020, he participated at the talk show 5.com s Danielom on Hrvatska Radiotelevizija where he performed the song "Trebam nekoga" together with Ante Gelo Band.

On 26 June 2023, Grašo released "Nemoj" together with Croatian singer Nina Badrić. A music video for the song, showing the duo playing each other's love interests premiered the same day. The song had premiered through a live performance by the duo the day before at the Melodije Jadrana. The song was highly commercially successful, debuting at number one on the Crotian HR Top 40 chart. On 30 October 2023, he performed on guitar at a restaurant together with singer Jelena Rozga; they sang the songs "Pisi mi" and "Oprosti mi pape". The video caught media attention as they were accompanied by Croatian actor Goran Bogdan. On 21 April, Grašo's guest appearance on Macedonian talk show Eden na Eden was broadcast on Kanal 5. A brief teaser had been released on YouTube 3 days prior in which the singer briefly discussed his hiatus from music in the period between 2006 and 2011.

On 30 August 2024, Grašo appeared on the sixth edition of the "Trag u beskraju" concert held in commemoration of Oliver Dragojević's death. He performed the song "Navika" together with Rozga. On 25 October 2024, he released the song "Šta bi ja bez tebe" by the Huljić duo as the opening song of the TV show U dobru i zlu broadcast on Nova TV. He decided to record the entire song after a request by the audience from hearing the chorus in the opening of the show. Additionally, he filmed a music video in black--and-white which featured three actors: Filip Juričić, Iva Mihalić and Mirna Medaković Stepinac. The song was highly commercially successful, reaching the top of the HR Top 40 in its third week on the chart for the issue dated 11 November 2024.

On 14 March 2026, Grašo gave a concert in Skopje together with Doris Dragović as a guest performer. He also gave an interview for Backstage Media on 25 February 2026 as a promotion of the concert. To promote the concert, he gave an interview for Macedonian TV Channel Sitel on 2 March and newspaper Sloboden Pečat on 4 March 2026 where he further spoke about Dragović and her mark on the music field in the ex-Yugoslav area. At the concert, the two appeared together to perform their duet "Sto je od mene ostalo".

== Artistry ==
During an interview with Sitel, Petar shared how he avoided opening a TikTok account despite knowing it would bring him a wider appeal to a younger audience as he tried to stay true to being "out of fashion" and produce "pure music". He also shared how he tried to incorporate artificial intelligence (AI) in the process of song-making but gave the opinion how it would never be able to replace his intuition or an artist's soul. He said that he considers the biggest influence in his music to be "Italian music with a bit of Dalmatian soul", citing Lucio Dalla, Jovanotti, Eros Ramazzotti and Zucchero as his biggest influencers. Today, he is one of the most popular male pop singers in Croatia, and is also well known in post-Yugoslav countries Serbia, Bosnia and Herzegovina, Montenegro, Slovenia, and North Macedonia.

== Personal life ==
Grašo was in a relationship with Croatian singer Danijela Martinović for 24 years after meeting her at Dora in Opatija in 1995. He was 19 at the time the two met and was helping out in the country's preparation for the Eurovision Song Contest with the song "Nostalgija". Martinović, however started publicly humiliating him and during an interview in 2019 criticized his manliness. She also stated how "they were never love at first sight" and recalled how she was unpleasantly surprised by his appearance during their first lunch together.

On 19 February 2022, he married Hana Huljić at the Saint Dominicus Church in Split. The high-profile wedding was attended by media from Serbia and the Huljić family among others. Singer Domenica Žuvela served as Hana's godmother, while Grašo's godfathers were basketball player Dino Rađa and Slovene horeca worker Tomaž Kavčić. The pair had a daughter Alba together in January 2022. In October 2024, they got a son named Toni, born by Caesarean section. During an interview, Grašo revealed how the two decided to live a more secluded life, far from the cameras in a circle of several close friends. In his free time, he likes to spend timeby the sea, eating seafood and socialize with friends.

When discussing his "recipe to a happy life", Petar cited his family, music, travelling and joy on the "list of ingredients". When asked where he would live if he had to live outside of Croatia, he chose Italy, specifically the city of Rome. He also elaborated how his biggest secret to success was being "genuine" and remaining constant on and off stage.

On 28 January 2024, he gave an interview to Telegraf that he was against the court's decision to take away singer Severina's custody over her son and how the public with a healthy reasoning capacity shared the same sentiment. He also shared how he considers her an intimate year-long friend.

== Discography ==
Solo

- Mjesec iznad oblaka (1997)
- Utorak (1999)
- Šporke riči (2003)

Compilation albums

- Best of Petar Grašo Uvertira 1995. – 2005. (2005)
- The Platinum Collection (2007)
- The Best Of Collection (2014)

With Tonči Huljić & Madre Badessa Band

- Ka hashish (2011)
