= Danijela Martinović =

Croatian singer (born 1971)

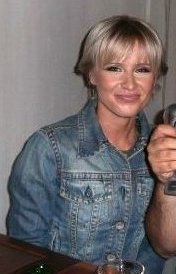
- Martinović in 2011

Background information
- Also known as: Danijela
- Born: Danijela Martinović; 15 July 1971 (age 55); Split, SR Croatia, Yugoslavia
- Genres: Pop
- Occupation: Singer
- Years active: 1989–present
- Formerly of: Magazin
- Spouse: Marko Perković (m. 1995; div. 1998)
- Partner: Petar Grašo (1999–2021)

Danijela Martinović (born 15 July 1971), also known mononymously as Danijela, is a Croatian pop singer who represented Croatia in the Eurovision Song Contest 1995 and 1998.

== Biography ==
Born in Split to Croatian parents, Martinović began to sing from an early age. She has a sister, Izabela, who also pursued a music career through Split-based pop rock act Stijene. Martinović's big breakthrough came in 1991 when she joined the pop band Magazin. Magazin had long been a big name on the Croatian music scene (as well as the wider area, dating back to Yugoslav times); as such, Martinović became one of the biggest national icons. They represented Croatia at the Eurovision Song Contest 1995, along with the opera singer Lidija Horvat-Dunjko, they performed the song "Nostalgija" finishing 6th (out of 23 entries) with 91 points.

In 1996, she left Magazin to pursue a solo career, but she continued to work with the band's leader and prolific songwriter Tonči Huljić. That partnership resulted in Martinović winning the 1998 Dora contest with the ballad "Neka mi ne svane" ("May the Sun Never Rise") and becoming the Croatian representative at the Eurovision Song Contest 1998, where she came in 5th (out of 25) with 131 pts.

In 2007, Martinović participated in the Croatian version of the television show Dancing with the Stars, in which she danced with Nicolas Quesnoit (who was the winner of the first season with Zrinka Cvitešić). She was eliminated in the 5th episode.

In December 2010, she released a song called "Pola Pola". In 2011, she released the album Unikat. She presented the song "Brodolom" ("Shipwreck") at the Croatian music festival SPLIT 2012. It became the biggest summer hit in Croatia. The song reached more than 3 million views on YouTube in less than one month.

== Discography ==
=== Albums ===
with Magazin

- Da mi te zaljubit' u mene (1991)
- Došlo vrijeme (1993)
- Simpatija (1994)

solo

- Zovem te ja (1996)
- To malo ljubavi (1998)
- I po svjetlu i po mraku (1999)
- Pleši sa mnom (2001)
- Božić s Danijelom (2003)
- Oaza (2005)
- Canta y baila con Danijela (2006)
- Unikat (2011)

=== Singles ===
Title	Year	Peak chart positions	Album
Title	Year	CRO	Album
"Zovem te ja"	1996	(Note: HR Top 40 was launched on 24 January 2013.)	Zovem te ja
"Ti možeš lagat svakome"	1996	(Note: HR Top 40 was launched on 24 January 2013.)	Zovem te ja
"Nemam s kime dočekati zime"	1997	(Note: HR Top 40 was launched on 24 January 2013.)	Zovem te ja
"Neka mi ne svane"	1998	(Note: HR Top 40 was launched on 24 January 2013.)	To malo ljubavi
"Što sam ja, što si ti"	1998	(Note: HR Top 40 was launched on 24 January 2013.)	To malo ljubavi
"Da je slađe zaspati"	1998	(Note: HR Top 40 was launched on 24 January 2013.)	To malo ljubavi
"Dobro je"	1998	(Note: HR Top 40 was launched on 24 January 2013.)	To malo ljubavi
"Izdali me"	1998	(Note: HR Top 40 was launched on 24 January 2013.)	To malo ljubavi
"Marke nemam"	1999	(Note: HR Top 40 was launched on 24 January 2013.)	I po svjetlu i po mraku
"Sedma godina"	1999	(Note: HR Top 40 was launched on 24 January 2013.)	I po svjetlu i po mraku
"Danima, godinama, satima"	1999	(Note: HR Top 40 was launched on 24 January 2013.)	I po svjetlu i po mraku
"Muko moja"	2000	(Note: HR Top 40 was launched on 24 January 2013.)	MHJ
"Tako mi fališ ti"	2001	(Note: HR Top 40 was launched on 24 January 2013.)	MHJ
"To nije to"	2001	(Note: HR Top 40 was launched on 24 January 2013.)	Pleši sa mnom
"Ovako ne mogu dalje"	2001	(Note: HR Top 40 was launched on 24 January 2013.)	Pleši sa mnom
"Pleši sa mnom"	2001	(Note: HR Top 40 was launched on 24 January 2013.)	Pleši sa mnom
"Grube riječi"	2001	(Note: HR Top 40 was launched on 24 January 2013.)	Pleši sa mnom
"Život stati neće"	2003	(Note: HR Top 40 was launched on 24 January 2013.)	Oaza
"Za tebe rođena"	2005.	(Note: HR Top 40 was launched on 24 January 2013.)	Oaza
"Gdje mi je pamet bila"	2005.	(Note: HR Top 40 was launched on 24 January 2013.)	Oaza
"Jednom se živi"	2005.	(Note: HR Top 40 was launched on 24 January 2013.)	Oaza
"Oči od safira"	2006	(Note: HR Top 40 was launched on 24 January 2013.)	Dora '06
"Na po' mi srce živi"	2007	(Note: HR Top 40 was launched on 24 January 2013.)	Nek' živi ljubav
"'Ko će tebe mi zaminit"	2008	(Note: HR Top 40 was launched on 24 January 2013.)	HRF
"Evo mene"	2008	(Note: HR Top 40 was launched on 24 January 2013.)	Splitski festival
"Danijela časti"	2009	(Note: HR Top 40 was launched on 24 January 2013.)	Unikat
"Zarobljenik uspomena" with Halid Bešlić	2010	(Note: HR Top 40 was launched on 24 January 2013.)	Unikat
"Pola, pola"	2010	(Note: HR Top 40 was launched on 24 January 2013.)	Unikat
"Živim da živim"	2011	(Note: HR Top 40 was launched on 24 January 2013.)	Unikat
"Ključ"	2011	(Note: HR Top 40 was launched on 24 January 2013.)	Unikat
"Brodolom"	2012	(Note: HR Top 40 was launched on 24 January 2013.)	Non-album single
"Raspašoj"	2012	15	Non-album single
"Cappucino"	2013	17	Non-album single
"Iluzija"	2014	4	Non-album single
"Naivno malo pile"	2014	12	Non-album single
"Dežuraj"	2015		Non-album single
"Jednu za ljubav"	2015		Non-album single
"Volim barabu"	2016	11	Non-album single
"Telefon"	2017	6	Non-album single
"Nemam mjeru"	2017	12	Non-album single
"Čovjek bez adrese"	2019	13	Non-album single
"Ljubav ne odustaje	2021	10	Non-album single
"Fortunata	2022	12	Non-album single
"Ono nešto" with Marko Škugor	2023	1	Non-album single
"Žena"	2024	4	Non-album single
"Početak" with Gabi Novak and Matija Dedić	2024	40	Non-album single
"Sve je na svon mistu"	2025	30	Non-album single
"Lipa ostani"	2026	8	Non-album single

== Notes ==
Preceded by Tony Cetinski with Nek' ti bude ljubav sva	Croatia in the Eurovision Song Contest (as part of Magazin); 1995	Succeeded by Maja Blagdan with Sveta ljubav
Preceded by E.N.I. with Probudi me	Croatia in the Eurovision Song Contest; 1998	Succeeded by Doris Dragović with Marija Magdalena
