= Tonči Huljić =

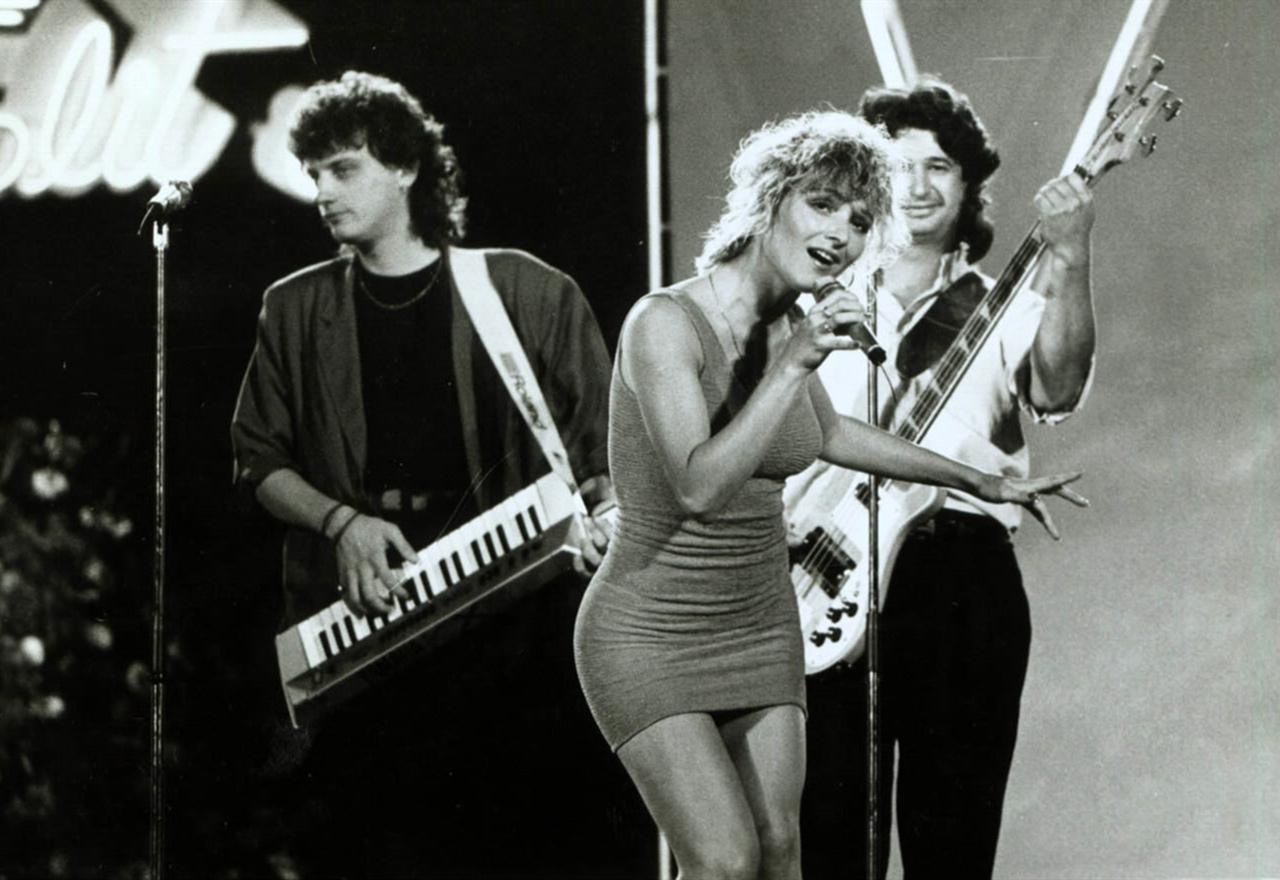
- Tonči Huljić (leftmost person) performing with Magazin in the 1980s
- Born: 29 October 1961 (age 64); Split, PR Croatia, Yugoslavia (now Croatia)
- Occupations: Musician; songwriter; music producer
- Spouse: Vjekoslava Tolić (m. 1987)
- Children: 2, including Ivan
- Relatives: Petar Grašo (son-in-law)
- Musical career
- Genres: Pop
- Instruments: Vocals; piano
- Years active: 1982–present
- Labels: Jugoton (1982–1989); Croatia Records (1991–present)
- Member of: Tonči Huljić & Madre Badessa Band
- Formerly of: Magazin

Tonči Huljić (pronounced [tôntʃi xǔːʎitɕ]; born 29 October 1961) is a Croatian musician, songwriter and music producer. He is best known as the founding member, songwriter and producer of one the most famous Croatian pop bands, Magazin.

During his career spanning more than five decades, Huljić has produced numerous hit singles, both for the group and for numerous solo artists which emerged from his record label. Some of the most prominent music artists who collaborated with him include Jelena Rozga, Doris Dragović, Petar Grašo as well as Maksim Mrvica, Danijela Martinović, Minea and Jole. In total, Huljić has produced and composed more than 1370 songs. In the 2000s, Huljić also worked on composing instrumental music for his first solo release Waterland (2006) and briefly ventured in production work for soap operas.

As of 2011, Tonči Huljić served as the founder and lead singer of the pop-ethno band called Tonči Huljić & Madre Badessa Band. He has released three studio albums with the band, namely Ka hashish, Panika and Inamorana. Huljić has received widespread recognition for his work both from his audience and from music critics. Songs produced by him have been awarded with various recognitions and prizes. In addition to his music career, Huljić has ventured into directing and coordinating theater shows and plays, TV series and sketches.

== Early life ==
Tonči Huljić was born on 29 October 1961 as the only child to father Ivan Huljić, an economist originally from Hvar and mother Marija Huljić, a health worker from Krk. Early on, Huljić emerged as a responsible and hard-working student. During his primary and secondary school, he simultaneously followed lower music and middle music school. Along with his gymnasium, he also followed piano classes. During interviews, he revealed how he had to follow around 28 music classes per year which caused him a lot of anxiety and pressure.

== Career ==
=== 1979-1983: Dalmatinski magazin and first success ===
Huljić first entered the music industry in 1979, when he joined the pop band Dalmatinski magazin (later renamed into Magazin) as a replacement for the previous guitarist. He soon became a key member and recorded the song "Školski dani" (lit. 'School Days') written by Gordan Franić and "Uspomene toplog ljeta" (lit. 'Memories of a Warm Summer') written by Teo Trumbić. Soon after, Huljić started writing and producing his own music and in 1980, he wrote the song "Sjećanja" (lit. 'Memories') which the group performed at the 1981 Split Festival. Furthermore, he wrote the song "Ne brini ništa" performed at Zagrebfest 1981.

Early on in his career, Huljić started collaborating and receiving advice from composer Zdenko Runjić who at the time also served as the main editor of Radio Split. During that time, Dalmatinski magazin was renamed only to Magazin. In 1983, Huljić produced the song "Kokolo" written by Zvonimir Stipičić, which soon became his first biggest hit. After achieving success at the Split Festival, the song was included in the eponymous Magazin album, which was released through Jugoton and received a Platinum certification.

=== 1980s: Magazin initial studio albums ===
During the 1980s, Huljić continued working and achieving success with songs produced for Magazin. In 1985, the song "Piši mi", performed at the Zagreb Festival of Contemporary Music achieved wide commercial success. The eponymous album from which the song was taken received a platinum certification, selling a total of 380.000 copies. In 1986, Magazin released their fifth studio album titled Put putujem which received a diamond certification, sold 670.000 copies and produced several hit singles including "Put putujem", "Ti si želja mog života" and "Tri sam ti zime šaptala ime". The following year brought several awards to the group including in the categories for Best Group, Best Pop Song and Hit of the Year. Besane noći was recorded and released in 1988 through the record label Jugoton. It was a commercial success, receiving a diamond certification from the Croatian Phonographic Industry and spawning several hit singles including the title track, "Suze krijem, one padaju", "Kad u vojsku pođeš", "Ej, ponoći" and "Oči crne, oči lažne". The following album, titled Dobro jutro was released in 1989 and received a diamond certification. Singles released from the album include "Ljube se dobri, loši, zli", "Sijaj zvijezdo Danice", "Balkanska ulica", "Rano, ranije" and "Čekala je jedna žena". The album marked the last record the group recorded with lead singer Ljiljana Nikolovska who decided to leave the group and continue living in the United States.

=== 1992-1996: Magazin with Danijela Martinović ===
Nikolovska was succeeded in Magazin by the singer Danijela Martinović. The group, with Huljić serving as its main producer released their ninth studio album Da mi te zaljubit u mene in 1992, which marked their last collaboration with Mate Došen who served as the arranger and producer. The album included the anti-war song "Mir, mir do neba" which was released amidst the Croatian War of Independence and the band and the Huljić duo renounced their rights for the group to donate the proceeds to humanitarian actions. The same year, Magazin went through another loss of a member, with Miro Crnko, the keyboardist leaving to Finland. In 1993, the band released their tenth studio album, titled Došlo vrijeme. That same year, Magazin performed at the Melodije hrvatskog Jadrana Festival with the song "Neću se vratiti". In 1994, the band appeared at another festival in Split, titled Zvončac, where they performed the song "Simpatija" in collaboration with Marija Bubić. The song was included on Magazin's album Simpatija which was released in the same year through Croatia Records. In 1995, the band performed the song "Nostalgija" together with Lidija Horvat Dunjko at the 1995 Dora festival and subsequently won the competition. This led to their performance at the 1995 Eurovision Song Contest held in Dublin where they received widespread acclaim and placed Croatia sixth on the competition. The following year, Martinović decided to leave the group to pursue a solo career, on which she continued working with Tonči Huljić as the main producer. Her position as lead vocalist in the band was overtaken by Jelena Rozga who debuted performing the song "Aha" on Dora, the Croatian song contest for Eurovision that year, where she finished second. That same year, in 1996, Huljić founded his own record label called Tonika Records. In 2002, Huljić founded a second record label called Croatia Records.

=== 1996-2006: Magazin with Jelena Rozga ===
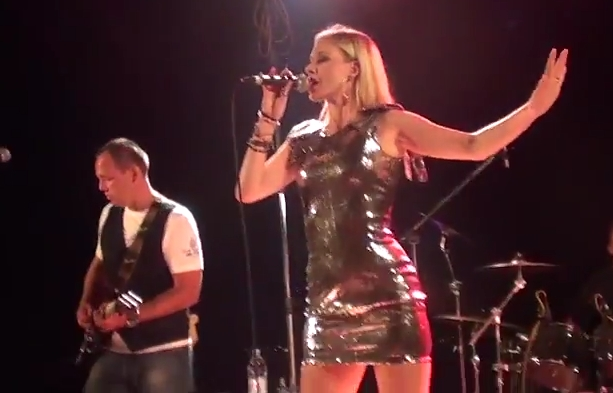
Jelena Rozga, one of Huljić's main collaborators

In 1996, who debuted with the group at the 1996 Melodije hrvatskog Jadrana Festival with the song "Suze biserne". The song instantly became popular among fans of the group and at the it was recognized as the most performed song of the year at the festival. In 1996, Magazin released their twelfth studio album titled Nebo boje moje ljubavi which was a big commercial success, and received a golden certification in Croatia. It produced several hit songs, including "Opijum", "Minut' srca tvog", "Nebo boje moje ljubavi" and "Samo navika" featuring Oliver Dragojević. In 1997, the bandcompeted at Dora with the song "Opijum", finishing seventh. In 1998, the group released Da si ti ja which was a commercial success in the region of former Yugoslavia, receiving a platinum certification in Croatia and Slovenia. The album produced several singles, including "Gutljaj vina", "Ginem", "Na svijetu sve" and "Idi i ne budi ljude". Despite achieving commercial success, some songs were not well received by music critics due to their "easy" and simple lyrics.

In 1999, Magazin performed at Dora with the song "Kasno je" and at the MHJ '99, they performed "Ako poludim". Minus i plus, the band's thirteenth stuidio album was released in 2000 and included several singles: "Minus i plus", "Je l' zbog nje", "Nemam snage da se pomirim" and "Ako poludim". The band performed "Hrvatska rapsodija" from the album at the 2000 Dora Festival and then "Nemam snage da se pomirim" at the Runjićev Festival. The next album, S druge strane mjeseca saw the release of several singles including the eponymous song, "Ko me zove?" and "Ne vjerujem tebi, ne vjerujem sebi"; the last was performed at the MHJ '02. The band also performed for the first time at the 2002 festival Zlatne žice Slavonije with the song "Hajde, kaži kako". In 2004, the band released Paa..? which included the hit singles "Ne tiče me se", "Troši i uživaj", "Kad bi bio blizu", "Da li znaš da te ne volim" and "Slatko, ljuto, kiselo". In promotion of the album, the band performed "Kad bi bio blizu" at the 2003 Radijski festival and "Da li znaš da te ne volim" at the Split Festival. In 2004, the band won at the Split Music Festival with the song "Ne tiče me se" and performed at the Zlatne žice Slavonije festival with the song "Često". The band competed at the Dora 2005 with the Biblical-themed song "Nazaret" featuring Ervin, placing second. In 2006, Rozga left the group to pursue a solo career and continued collaborating with Tonči Huljić.

=== 2010s: Solo career and production work ===
During the 2000s, Huljić worked on the production label called AVA in collaboration with Roman Majetić; he worked on four soap operas which featured 680 episodes and achieved viewership records in the wider region. In 2009, Huljić released Waterland, his first solo studio album which featured instrumental songs.

=== 2011-present: Tonči Huljić & Madre Badessa Band ===
In 2021, the punk ska song "Bogu iza nogu" ("Behind God's Legs") was released as Tonči Huljić & Madre Badessa Band's single and the opening song of the eponymous show broadcast on Nova TV. In 2022, the band released the song titled "Baci oko na mene" ("Keep an eye out on the old one"); the song is meant as a parody of his life, is dedicated to his newly born nephew and is musically similar to the musical style of the 1980s. He explained the meaning as "keep an eye out" on the old one, so that he does not shame us, referring to himself. The music video is also meant as a parody and references his son-in-law Petar Grašo.

Most of 2022 saw Huljić touring Croatia and Greece with his project Pop Misa Mediterrana (Mediterranean Pop Mass) which included 20 musicians, instrumentalists and vocalists on stage. The project marked an amalgamation of a musical and classical Christian rituals sung in Latin. As the project falls within the domain of spiritual music, he had to receive approval from the Vatican. The mass consists of five parts: "Kyrie Eleison", "Gloria", "Credo", "Sanctus Benedictus", "Agnus Dei". In 2022, the band recorded "Škiljim škiljim" for promotional purposes of Optika Anda. In the promotional video, Huljić appears dressed as a pirate. On 22 November 2022, Huljić released a performance of "Temple of Zeus" together with an orchestra, for which he served as the musician, keyboard player, arranger and conductor.

== Other activities ==
In addition to producing and writing music, Huljić also appeared in singing competitions in the Balkans. He first appeared as a judge on the regional talent show Operacija trijumf which started in September 2008, where he served as one of the judges along with Marina Tucaković and Ismeta Dervoz. In 2017, he was one of the judges on the second series of X Factor Adria.

Huljić showed great managerial ability and founded record label Tonika Records that is among the most influential in Croatia. He has also written popular pieces for Croatian piano player Maksim Mrvica, such as "Kolibre" and "Nostradamus", and Maksim's greatest hit, "Croatian Rhapsody". Through the label, he has established the career of many famous Croatian singers and recording artists.

== Political views ==
During an interview, Huljić discussed Yugo-nostalgia, commenting that he believes many people tend to look at the past with the idea that circumstances were better, which according to him is not the case. Referring to the comment, he noted that the best day is the "present day" and "each current day is worse than tomorrow". He also added that he has managed to achieve success in all six post-Yugoslav countries that emerged from Yugoslavia. As a regular participant of the Dora music festival, Huljić participated until 2013 with the song "Providenca" after which he decided to stop submitting entries.

== Impact ==
Since its conception, Magazin gradually built a reputation as one of the most popular and most enduring Croatian pop bands, with repertoire and music arrangements influenced by Dalmatian folk music. In the 1990s, following the breakup of Yugoslavia, Huljić was among the first Croatian musicians to introduce elements of folk music from other former Yugoslav republics into his repertoire. Although many rock critics did not like that and accused Huljić of bringing turbo-folk to Croatian music, Magazin became arguably the most popular music group in Croatia at the time. Its popularity continued across republics of the former Yugoslavia, just as it had done previously.

== Private life ==
As of 1987, Tonči Huljić is married to lyricist, songwriter and novelist Vjekoslava Huljić, whom he has two children with, Ivan Huljić and Hana Huljić. During interviews, Huljić has revealed that he has attention-related disorders which he tried to use as a source of creativity and productivity.

== Discography ==
=== Studio albums ===
Title	Details	Peak chart positions
Title	Details	CRO
Inamorana	Released: 16 April 2021; Label: Croatia Records; Formats: CD, digital download, streaming	1

=== Singles ===
Title	Year	Peak chart positions	Album
Title	Year	CRO	Album
"Inamorana" (with Petar Grašo)	2021	2	Inamorana

=== Producer work ===
==== Authorship studio albums ====
- Gold Collection (2008)
- Waterland (2009)
- Ka Hashish (2011, with Madre Badessa)
- Larin Izbor (2012, with Madre Badessa)
- Panika (2014, with Madre Badessa)
- Best Of (2015, with Madre Badessa)
- Tipo Primitivo / Piano Primitivo (2017, with Madre Badessa)

==== Studio albums for other artists ====
Magazin albums

- Slatko Stanje (1982)
- Kokolo (1983)
- O-La-La (1984)
- Piši Mi (1985)
- Put Putujem (1986)
- Magazin (1987)
- Besane Noći (1988)
- Dobro Jutro (1989)
- Da mi te Zaljubit' U Mene (1991)
- Najbolje Godine (1991)
- Magazin – Koncert! (1993)
- Došlo Vrijeme (1993)
- Simpatija (1994)
- Nebo boje moje ljubavi (1996)
- Svi Najveći Hitovi 1983.-1990. (1998)
- Da Si Ti Ja (1998)
- Minus i Plus (2000)
- Best of BR. 1. Zar Je Ljubav Spala Na To (2001)
- Best of BR. 2 Bol (2001)
- S Druge Strane Mjeseca (2002)
- Pa..? (2004)
- Dueti (2005)
- The Platinum Collection (2006)
- Live Collection: Magazin - Koncert (Reizdanje) (2007)
- Dama i Car (2007)
- Bossa N’ Magazin (2008)
- Godine s Ivanom 2006.-2010. (2010)
- Najljepše Ljubavne Pjesme (2010)
- 100 Originalnih Pjesama (2013)
- Mislim Pozitivno (2014)

Doris Dragović albums

- Ispuni Mi Zadnju Želju (1994)
- Baklje Ivanjske (1995)
- Rođendan u Zagrebu (1996)
- Krajem Vijeka (1999)
- Lice (2000)
- 20 Godina s Ljubavlju (2001)
- Malo Mi Za Sriću Triba (2002)
- The Platinum Collection (2007)
- Najljepše Ljubavne Pjesme (2010)
- The Best of Collection (2014)
- Koncert u Lisinskom (2014)

Danijela Martinović albums

- Zovem Te Ja (1996)
- To Malo Ljubavi (1998)
- I Po Svijetu i Po Mraku (2001)
- Najbolje Godine (2001)
- Zlatna Kolekcija (2006)
- Canta y Baila con Daniela (2006)
- Najljepše Ljubavne Pjesme (2010)
- The Best of Collection (2014)

Petar Grašo albums

- Mjesec Iznad Oblaka (1997)
- Utorak (1999)
- Šporke Riči (2003)
- Uvertira (2005)
- The Platinum Collection (2007)
- The Best of Collection (2014)

Jelena Rozga albums

- Oprosti Mala (2006)
- Bižuterija (2011)
- Best of Jelena Rozga (2012)
- Moderna Žena (2016, 16 songs)

Domenica albums

- Ćiribu Ćiriba (2019)

Maksim Mrvica albums

- The Piano Player (2003)
- Variations Part I&II (2004)
- A New World (2005)
- Electrik (2006)
- Pure (2007)
- Pure II (2008)
- Greatest (2008)
- Appassionata (2011)
- The Movies (2014)
- Mezzo e Mezzo (2014)
- Croatian Rhapsody (2015)
- New Silk Road (2018)

Bond albums

- Born (2000)
- Shine (2002)
- Atlanta Time (2003)
- Remixed (2003)
- Classified (2004)
- Explosive: The Best Of Bond (2005)
- Play (2011)

Wild albums

- Time (2004)

Minea albums

- Vrapci & Komarci (1995)
- E, Pa Neka! (1997)
- Mimo Zakona (2000)
- Kad Smo...Ono Znaš (2001)
- Sve Najbolje (2003)

Jole albums

- Jednina i Množina (1999)
- Sve Su Žene Lijepe (2001)
- Otključano! (2004)
- Odijelo (2009)
- Remek Djelo (2015)
- The Best of Collection (2018)

Zlatko Pejaković albums

- Zlatko (1989)
- Kad Prodje Sve (1990)
- Zlatko Pejaković '93 (1993)
- Zlatko Pejaković '94 (1994)

==== Miscellaneous work ====
Songs for other performers

- Oliver Dragojević ("Dvaput san umra", "Neka se drugi raduju")
- Sandi Cenov

Music for TV series

- Villa Maria (2004)
- Ljubav u zaleđu (2005)
- Obicni Ljudi (2006)
- Ponos Ratkajevih (2007)
- Zakon Ljubavi (2008)
- Larin Izbor (2011)
- Stella (2013)
- Zora Dubrovačka (2013)
- Kud Puklo Da Puklo (2014)
- Prava Žena (2016)
- Pogrešan Čovjek (2018)
- Na Granici (2018, 2019)

Music for Movies

- xXx: State of the Union (2005)
- Čitulja za Eskobara (2008, "Kokolo" – Magazin)
- Larin Izbor: Izgubljeni Princ (2012)
- Tonči Huljić: Tonetov Život Ili Bog, Lavur, Iće i Piće (2014)
- Ljudožder Vegetarijanac (2012, "Bižuterija" – Jelena Rozga, "Još se ne bi udala" – Magazin)

Eurovision Song Contest

- Magazin & Lidija Horvat Dunjko – "Nostalgija" (1995)
- Doris Dragović – "Marija Magdalena" (1999)
- Vanna – "Strings of My Heart" (2001)
- Igor Cukrov & Andrea Šušnjara – "Lijepa Tena" (2009)

== See also ==
- The Piano Player
- Vjekoslava Huljić
- Music of Croatia
- Popular music in Croatia
- Popular music in Yugoslavia
