= Minut Srca Mog =

Compilation album by Jelena Rozga
- Released: 14 November 2022
- Recorded: 2020–2022
- Genre: Pop; folk
- Length: 74:19
- Label: Croatia; Tonika
- Producer: Tonči Huljić; Srđan "Skansi" Sekulović

Jelena Rozga chronology
Jelena Rozga (2017)	Minut Srca Mog (2022)

Singles from Minut Srca Mog
- 1. "Zar je ljubav spala na to" Released: 15 September 2022; 2. "Grizem" Released: 21 October 2022

Minut Srca Mog (English: A Minute of My Heart) is the first acoustic and third overall compilation album by Croatian pop singer Jelena Rozga. It was released on 14 November 2022 through Croatia Records and Tonika Records. The album consists of acoustic reworks of 19 of the singer's songs recorded during the period when she was the lead singer of the pop band Magazin and during her solo career. As with her previous releases, most songs were arranged and written by Tonči Huljić and Vjekoslava Huljić. On Minut Srca Mog, Srđan "Skansi" Sekulović served as the main producer.

Work on the album began in 2019 after the success of Rozga's acoustic performance on narodni radio. Nevertheless, due to restrictions related to the COVID-19 pandemic and the scrapped initial work, the album was only finalized in 2022. Making a reference to Magazin's 1996 single "Minut' srca tvog", Rozga decided to dedicate the album to her faithful audience and people who use their heart as a guide in life. The album was commercially successful in Croatia, peaking at the top of the Croatian Albums Chart.

Promotion of the album in Serbia and the wider Balkan region will take place in November 2022. The first single off the album, "Zar je ljubav spala na to" featuring Matija Cvek was released on 15 September 2022 along with a music video. "Grizem", originally recorded for the singer's second studio album Bižuterija (2011), was released as the second single off the album on 21 October 2022. An accompanying tour in promotion of the album, titled Minut Srca Mog Tour commenced on 17 December 2022 in Zagreb, before continuing with concerts in other Balkan countries.

== Conception ==
"They say, the one who wants to sing will always find a song, and in front of you, you have songs which have found me. A lot of wonderful songs have marked my life and choosing the ones which would be included in this album I neither knew nor could do alone, so I listened to the one thing that never gave me a bad advice in the twenty seven years of my career, my heart. The twelve beautiful songs which celebrate life and the power of love I dedicate to my audience, to the person who finds a part of themselves in my songs, the audience which supports me without reserves in all my dreams."

— Jelena Rozga, 2022

Jelena Rozga first announced her plans of working on an acoustic album during interviews in 2019. The conception of the album came following the immediate success of her acoustic medley performance of three of her songs "Oprosti mala", "Opijum" and "S druge strane mjeseca" on narodni radio's YouTube channel. She decided together with her producer and main collaborator Tonči Huljić to select some of her older songs, during the era when she served as the lead singer of the band Magazin and make acoustic reworks of them. Although she initially wanted to make it a double-disc album in which she could include many of her discography of over 100 songs, Rozga, Tonči and Vjekoslava Huljić ended up with a selection of 17 songs.

Delays in the album's release happened due to the COVID-19 pandemic and the singer's dissatisfaction with the initial reworks, which she decided to completely scrape. On 9 September 2022, Rozga released a post on Instagram through which she asked fans to help her out with the title of the album. On 15 September 2022, she confirmed that the title of the album would be Minut Srca Mog (English: A Minute of My Heart) in reference to her 1996 single of the same name ("Minut srca tvog") and as a dedication to "all of us, who use their heart as a guide in life". The singer revealed during an interview that while only the opening song "Zar je ljubav spala na to" was rearranged instrumentally and musically, the rest of the songs were included in their original forms only played and sung live. Some newly included instruments include strings, French harmonicas and Mediterranean mandolins.

The final track listing of Minut Srca Mog, which is a pop record featured 19 songs, from which 17 were Rozga's own songs performed either during the period when she served as the lead singer of the group Magazin or during her solo career. Additionally, the album features two cover versions, one of "Ti si želja mog života" by Magazin during the period when Ljiljana Nikolovska served as the band's lead singer and another of "Rano", which was originally performed by Croatian pop singer Minea and included on her third studio album Mimo zakona (2000).

== Promotion ==
During press releases and interviews in August 2022, Rozga revealed some of the 19 acoustic reworks from the album's track listing, including "Ti si želja mog života", "Ne tiče me se", "Dani su bez broja", "Je l' zbog nje", "Ginem", "Opijum", "Grizem", a cover of Minea's "Rano". On 3 November 2022, Rozga revealed that the promotion of the album would start on 14 November 2022 in Zagreb. On 13 November, Rozga announced through Instagram that the album, whose track listing and artwork she shared with her fans, would be made available the next day both on YouTube and on other streaming platforms. The following day, she appeared at the Esplanade Zagreb Hotel for a performance of songs from the album; the event was visited by close collaborators, other musicians and family, most notably Rozga's parents whose first appearance was documented by the press.

=== Touring ===
In May 2022, Rozga announced her third concert tour in promotion of the album, titled The Rozga Tour. It marked her first tour in eleven years since she last performed with the Karlovačko Live Tour '11. After the release of the acoustic compilation album, the tour was renamed to Minut Srca Mog Tour. The tour started at the Zagreb Arena in Zagreb, Croatia on 17 December 2022. The tour will also visit the Spaladium Arena concert in Split on 11 February 2023 and the Stark Arena concert in Belgrade on 7 April 2023. The tour is also expected to visit major cities in other Balkan countries, such as Skopje in North Macedonia, Sarajevo in Bosnia and Herzegovina and Ljubljana in Slovenia. The singer described it as the biggest production show of her career, for which she also included fireworks, 20 dancers on stage and three costume changes. Žiga Sotlar served as the show's choreographer and the fashion duo eNVy room served as the fashion designers behind the singer's looks. The three-hour long concerts were divided in three separate parts and included songs spanning the singer's discography from the time she served as the lead singer of Magazin and those recorded in her solo career. The tour was a big critical success with some music critics dubbing it the performative highlight of the singer's 27-year long music career with "impeccable" planning and showcase of talent, energy and vocal capabilities. Additionally, the tour was commercially successful with the initial concerts being sold out several months in advance.

=== Singles ===
In August 2022, it was confirmed that the album would open with an acoustic rework of "Zar je ljubav spala na to" featuring Croatian pop vocalist Matija Cvek; a music video for the rework was also announced. Rozga's idea to collaborate with the singer came after she heard his cover of her single "Suze biserne" during his live concerts. "Zar je ljubav spala na to" was originally recorded as a 2001 collaboration between Magazin and Mladen Vojičić Tifa, the former lead singer of the Yugoslav Trock band Bijelo Dugme. The single, produced by Srđan Sekulović – Skansi was released on 15 September 2022 along with a music video directed by Dario Radusin. Upon its release, the song was well received by the press who commended Cvek's vocals and demonstration of talent on the song. Fans were more divided in their response; while some felt that the duo's vocals worked well together, others felt it would be hard to emulate the original featuring Tifa. The single was commercially successful on the HR Top 40, the country's airplay chart, where it peaked at number four for the week ending 29 August 2022.

On 21 October 2022, Rozga announced through her official Instagram account that "Grizem", originally recorded for her second studio album Bižuterija (2011) would be released as the second single from the acoustic album. The decision to release the song came after she felt that it "unjustly" did not reach its full potential during the time of its first release. Rozga added: "It is an empowering song, there has not been a woman who has not found herself in the situation to worry due to something or even worse, due to someone. Women who have not at least once carried the burden of failed love on their backs. [...] Setting boundaries, not wasting a minute on someone who does not deserve you is a process which is imposed on women with years. I am happy that in my 'pockets' I have a song which I sang more and more honestly with the passing of years." The following day, the single was released along with a visuals video directed by Dario Radusin; the singer appears dressed in a short, tassel dress, black high heels and curly hair as she lip-syncs the song to the camera in front of a movie spotlight. Upon its release, both the singer's look in the video and the rework were met with positive critics from the audience. "Grizem" debuted at number 27 on the HR Top 40 for the week ending 24 October 2022 before falling off the chart the following week.

== Commercial performance ==
For the week ending 28 November 2022, Minut Srca Mog debuted at number four on the Croatian Albums Chart. The following weak, the album moved to the first position on the chart. At the 2023 Porin Awards, the album was nominated in the category for Best Pop Album, but lost to Tedi Spalato's Ime mi je nevažno.

== Track listing ==
All tracks are written by Tonči Huljić and Vjekoslava Huljić, except where noted, and produced by Srđan "Skansi" Sekulović.

Minut Srca Mog track listing
No.	Title	Originally included in	Length
1.	"Minut srca tvog"	Nebo boje moje ljubavi (1996)	4:51
2.	"Nebo boje moje ljubavi"	Nebo boje moje ljubavi (1996)	3:48
3.	"S druge strane Mjeseca"	S druge strane Mjeseca (2002)	4:16
4.	"Dani su bez broja"	S druge strane Mjeseca (2002)	3:52
5.	"Roba s greškom"	Oprosti mala (2006)	4:06
6.	"'Ko me zove"	S druge strane Mjeseca (2002)	3:45
7.	"Cirkus"	Moderna žena (2016)	4:05
8.	"Je l' zbog nje"	Minus i plus (2000)	3:28
9.	"Minus i plus"	Minus i plus (2000)	4:08
10.	"Solo igračica"	Moderna žena (2016)	3:38
11.	"Ginem"	Da si ti ja (1998)	4:12
12.	"Opijum"	Da si ti ja (1998)	3:18
13.	"Ti si želja mog života" (written by T. Huljić, Zvonko Stipičić and Marina Tucaković)	Magazin (1987)	4:11
14.	"Zar je ljubav spala na to" (with Matija Cvek)	Best of..., Vol. 1 (2001)	4:30
15.	"Rano" (Minea cover)	Mimo zakona (2000)	3:13
16.	"Prorok"	S druge strane Mjeseca (2002)	4:20
17.	"Ne tiče me se"	Paaa..? (2004)	3:35
18.	"Grizem"	Bižuterija (2011)	3:59
19.	"Oprosti mala"	Oprosti mala (2006)	3:04
Total length:			74:19

Notes

- All the songs are subtitled "Acoustic", apart from "Zar je ljubav spala na to". For example, track 1 is stylized as "Minut srca tvog (Acoustic)".
- All the albums from Paaa..? (2004) and older are released by Magazin, while all the albums from Oprosti mala (2006) and newer are released solo by Rozga.
- The song "Rano" is taken from the album Mimo zakona (2000), which is released by Minea.

== Personnel ==
- Credits are taken from the respective song descriptions from the singer's official YouTube channel.

Musicians

- Jelena Rozga – vocals (all tracks)
- Davor Petrović – guitar (all tracks), backing vocals (track 1, 19)
- Mario Ferin – piano (all tracks), harmonica (track 2)
- Ivica Ciban – bass guitar (all tracks)
- Nebojša Škrgić – drums (all tracks)
- Dean Melki – violin (all tracks except 12)
- Matej Milošev – cello (all tracks), violoncello (track 18)
- Ivan Bonačić – tenor saxophone (track 1, 9, 18)
- Zvonimir Bajević – horn (track 1, 9, 18)
- Petar Tepšić – trumpet (track 1, 9, 18)
- Srđan Sekulović Skansi – additional keyboard (track 1, 4, 11, 17)
- Ivana Čabraja – backing vocals (track 3, 5, 10, 14, 18)
- Darija Hodnik – backing vocals (track 4, 6, 7, 8, 11, 14, 15, 16, 17)

Technical

- Tonči Huljić – arrangement (all tracks)
- Vjekoslava Huljić – lyrics (all tracks)

== Charts ==
Chart performance for Minut Srca Mog
Chart (2022)	Peak position
Croatian Domestic Albums (HDU)	1
