= Goran Karan =

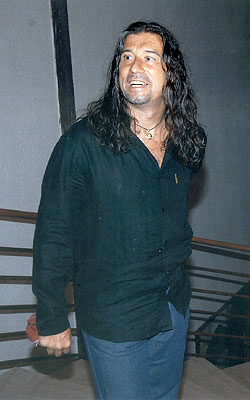

Background information
- Born: Goran Karan; 2 April 1964 (age 62); Belgrade, SR Serbia, Yugoslavia
- Origin: Split, Croatia
- Genres: Pop, Disco
- Occupation: Singer
- Instruments: vocals, piano, hammond organ, acoustic guitar
- Years active: 1988–present
- Labels: Hayat Production, Menart
- Website: www.gorankaran.hr

Goran Karan (born 2 April 1964) is a Croatian singer-songwriter. He specializes in songs influenced by Dalmatian folk music and is known for his powerful and refined tenor voice. Karan's collaboration with composer Zdenko Runjić led to some of his most acclaimed work, which won him several awards.

== Biography ==
Karan was the lead singer of Croatian rock group Big Blue, before becoming a solo artist in 1997.

In 2000, he represented Croatia at the Eurovision Song Contest, after winning the Croatian pre-selection Dora. In the Eurovision Song Contest, he ended up in ninth place with his song "Kad zaspu anđeli" ("When Angels Fall Asleep").

In 2005 he was one of the judges in Hrvatski idol, the Croatian version of Pop Idol. Karan's song "Ružo moja bila" won the 2005 Split Festival song competition, as well as the 2005 Sunčane skale festival in Herceg Novi.

In summer 2007, deeply moved by the Kornati fire tragedy, in which 13 volunteer firemen perished, he composed in the spur of the moment the song "Ovo nije kraj" ("This Is Not the End") and gathered under the name Split Star a group of famous singers (Oliver Dragojević, Marko Perković Thompson, Tedi Spalato, Dražen Zečić, Alen Nižetić, Hari Rončević) from the Split area, who performed it with him in a music video, all of this in less than fifteen days.

== Albums ==
- Kao da te ne volim (Like I Don't Love You) - 1999
- Vagabundo (Vagabund) - 2000
- Ahoj! (Ahoy!) - 2003
- Od srca do usana (From Heart to the Lips) - 2005
- Zlatna kolekcija (Golden Collection) - 2005
- Dite Ljubavi (Child of Love) - 2008

Awards and achievements
Preceded by Doris Dragović with "Marija Magdalena"	Croatia in the Eurovision Song Contest; 2000	Succeeded by Vanna with "Strings of My Heart"
Preceded by Romana Panić	Sunčane Skale winner 2005	Succeeded by Milena Vučić
