= Krajem vijeka =

Studio album by Doris Dragović
- Released: 1999
- Recorded: 1999
- Genre: Pop, dance-pop
- Label: Croatia Records, Orfej, Tonika
- Producer: Tonči Huljić

Doris Dragović chronology
Živim po svom (1997)	Krajem vijeka (1999)	Lice (2000)

Krajem vijeka (English: At the End of a Century) is the twelfth studio album by Croatian pop singer Doris Dragović, released in 1999. The album was released by Croatia Records, Orfej and Tonika record labels, and produced by eminent Croatian music producer and songwriter Tonči Huljić. Huljić also wrote most of the album's songs. Krajem vijeka also featured the song "Marija Magdalena", with which Dragović won fourth place at the Eurovision Song Contest 1999.

== Eurovision Song Contest 1999 ==
In 1999, Dragović was chosen to represent Croatia in the Eurovision Song Contest 1999, after she won national election HRT Dora with her dramatic song "Marija Magdalena", written by prominent Croatian songwriter Tonči Huljić. Dragović placed a respectable fourth in Jerusalem, despite having been drawn early in the singing order, sometimes cited as a disadvantage. Her performance also included the removal of some of her clothing — seen jocularly as a staple of Eurovision performances — and was well received in the first contest in which most countries allocated their points after a public telephone vote. This remains one of Croatia's best results at the contest. "Marija Magdalena" was also a radio hit on Greek radio station FLY FM 89,7 and reached number one on its airplay.

== Track listing ==
1. "Šakom o stol" (Tonči Huljić, Vjekoslava Huljić, Remi Kazinoti)
2. "Niti kunem, niti molim" (Adonis Ćulibrk Boytronic, Vjekoslava Huljić, Davor Devčić)
3. "Kao ti" (Tonči Huljić, Vjekoslava Huljić, Remi Kazinoti)
4. "To" (Tonči Huljić, Vjekoslava Huljić, Remi Kazinoti)
5. "Moram" (Tonči Huljić, Vjekoslava Huljić, Remi Kazinoti)
6. "Marija Magdalena" (Tonči Huljić, Vjekoslava Huljić, Remi Kazinoti)
7. "Sudnji dan" featuring Magazin (Tonči Huljić, Vjekoslava Huljić, Davor Devčić)
8. "Ne bi' ne bi'" (Tonči Huljić, Vjekoslava Huljić, Remi Kazinoti)
9. "Oprosti mi" (Adonis Ćulibrk Boytronic, Faruk Buljubašić Fayo, Remi Kazinoti)
