= Ivan Božičević =

Croatian composer and keyboardist (born 1961)

- Born: 27 May 1961 (age 65); Belgrade, Serbia
- Origin: Croatia
- Occupations: Composer, Pianist, Organist and Jazz musician

Ivan Božičević (born 27 May 1961 in Belgrade, Serbia) is a Croatian composer, organist, pianist, and jazz musician.

== Biography ==
Božičević was born in Belgrade. After initial piano studies, he joined the composition class of A. Obradović at the Belgrade Faculty of Music. He graduated in 1984, earning a master's degree in 1989. Until 2001 he occupied a teaching post for Harmony, Counterpoint and Analysis there and at the Academy of Arts in Novi Sad. In December 2001 he moved to Split, Croatia, where he started working as a freelance artist. As of 2018, he leads the composition class at the Split Academy of Arts.

From 1984 to 1988 he studied organ at the Hochschule für Musik in Frankfurt with the renowned professor Edgar Krapp. His work encompasses a broad repertoire, with special emphasis on baroque and modern music. Specializes early organ music in Salamanca (with Guy Bovet and Montserrat Torrent). Gives many successful concerts in Croatia, Germany, Hungary, Serbia, Spain, Sweden, Switzerland and the United States.

His creative output encompasses five symphonic works, orchestral, chamber, choir and soloistic works, as well as electronic compositions and jazz music. He received numerous composition awards, and his works are frequently played on radio, TV and concerts (performances in Croatia, Germany, Russia, Serbia, Sweden, the United Kingdom and the United States).

After moving to Split, he widens his music activity to include organ and piano playing, composing, arranging and theatre music. His collaborations include top Croatian jazz and pop musicians (Dražen Bogdanović, Tedi Spalato, Hari Rončević as well as Dalmatian klapa ensembles («Cambi»). Božičević runs a jazz-band called SplitMinders, whose repertoire is based on originals and arrangements of dalmatian folk songs. He also works with the fusion band "Waveform" and various other jazz, blues and bossa-nova formations. Božičević is a founding member of the Split society for contemporary music ("Splithesis", 2008).

== Awards and recognitions ==
Awards that Božičević has received for his compositions include: Stevan Hristić Award, Silver Medal of the Belgrade University of Arts (Serbia); Mandolina Imota, Cro Patria Golden Cathedral, Hrvatski sabor kulture (Croatia); CEC Artslink Fellowship Award, Garth Newel Award, Aliénor Award, AGO/ECS Publishing Award, AGO/Marilyn Mason Award, Random Access Music Award, (United States); Anton Stadler Award, John Clare Award (United Kingdom); Prague Philharmonic Choir Composition Award (Czech Republic); Premio Cristobal Halffter (Spain); Trio Anima Mundi Prize (Australia), European Organ composition competition (Luxembourg)., AGO Pogorzelski-Yankee Award (USA).

== Selection of works ==
Orchestral and Concertante:

- Music for big orchestra (1983)
- Essercizi sinfonici (1986)
- Five haiku after Bashô (1989)
- Marittimo (2006) for oboe, piano and string orchestra
- Rethink (2019)
- Swim Inside My Dreams (2021), concerto for organ and orchestra
- Aulosaulos (2024), concertino for two oboes and string orchestra
- Swim Without the River (2024), concerto for organ, string orchestra and timpani

Chamber ensembles:

- Sonata (1981) for violin and piano
- Three ‘female’ songs (1981) for soprano voice and piano
- Pathways (1982) for string quartet
- E (1983) for oboe solo
- Rivers, like in a dream (1983) for bass-clarinet and organ
- Play E.S. (1983) for two women's voices, bass-clarinet, piano, organ, synthesizer and percussion
- Essercizi da camera (1985) for 13 string players
- Chamber Music (1986) for soprano voice, violoncello and piano (poetry of J. Joyce, in English)
- Mandorle dolce, mandorle amare (1999) for mandolin orchestra
- Airborne (2007) for bas clarinet and string quartet (or string orchestra); version for clarinet and string quartet (2008)
- Pebbles (2008) for flute, oboe, double-bass and piano
- Marittimo (2008) version for soprano saxophone, piano and string quintet; version for trumpet, piano and string quintet (2010)
- Cascades classiques (2008) for string orchestra
- Canto de la ave rapiega (2009) for violoncello and piano; version for bass clarinet and piano, version for bass clarinet and organ (2012)
- A thousand pines, one Moon (2009) for chamber ensemble; version for two pianos (2012)
- Lamento (2009) for alto flute and organ
- Tracing (2010) for one harmony and three melody instruments
- Sustainable development (2010) for chamber ensemble; version for two pianos (2016)
- Raven's Pass (2010) for basset clarinet and piano
- Monkey Face (2010) for violin, viola, cello and piano; version for string quartet and piano (2016)
- Spring passes (2011) for piano four-hands and string quintet; version for two pianos (2013)
- Alienor Courante (2011) for soprano (or choir), cello (or gamba) and harpsichord
- Ascent to the Cold Mountain (2012) for string quartet
- Spiritual Mountain (2012) for flute, alto sax and piano
- Prayer Wheel/Coiling Clouds (2013) for saxophone quartet
- Shaken From a Crane's Bill (2014) for clarinet, violin and piano
- Come, Sit With Me in the Clouds (2016) for violin, cello and piano
- Ibis (2016) for flute, cello and piano
- Circling (2017) for clarinet quartet; also version for guitar quartet
- Cor mundum (2018) for soprano voice, flute and organ
- Color Of Time (2020) for seven flutes; also version for jazz sax, double bass and MIDI-controlled organ
- The Quietude Of Stones (2020) for 14 string players
- White Birds (2023) for recorder, pan flute, viola, accordion, percussion and MIDI-controlled organ; also version for amplified harpsichord and tape
- Rig Veda X.129 (2025) for soloists, ensemble, fixed audio and video
- The Lens Grinder (2025) for flute and tape

Keyboard instruments:

- Five haiku after Bashô (1987) for organ
- Sotto voce (1994/2008) for piano
- Behind the cloud (1996) for organ
- Microgrooves (2011) for harpsichord; version for organ (2016)
- Summer in the world (2013) for harpsichord; also version for organ (2016) and for jazz sax, double bass and organ (2023)
- If There Is a Place Between (2014) for harpsichord
- The Moonpiper (2015) for organ
- Summer Triptych (2015) for organ
- Radiance Triptych (2016) for organ
- Ariel (2017) for two pianos
- Rivers Of Eden (2020) for organ
- Willows are Green, Flowers are Crimson (2021) for amplified harpsichord and computer-controlled organ
- Organic Steelworks (2022) for organ and tape
- Disentanglement (2023) for live and MIDI-controlled organ (or tape)

Computer-controlled electronics:

- Senecio / Astrolabe (1992)
- Sanza (1992)
- Isle of voices (1992), cycle of 6 pieces
- Moon's turning point (1993)
- Weather Forecast of the Heart (2015) for clarinet and electronics
- Hunter's Moon (2019) for flute, violoncello and electronics; also version for soprano sax, electric guitar and electronics

Choral music:

- Good Shepherd (2000), for women's choir and piano
- Sundial (2003), for women's choir, percussion and piano
- Veronica (2004), for women's choir and piano
- The Everlasting Voices (2010), for women's choir; version for mixed choir (2010)
- Kyrie eleison (2012), for mixed choir and organ
- Spring passes (2012), for 8-part mixed choir and piano 4-hands; version for mixed choir a cappella ("Yuku haru ya")
- With a glorious eye (2014), for mixed choir and organ
- Cor mundum (2017), for mixed choir

Theoretical:

- Technique and structure of fugue in organ works of D. Buxtehude (1995), dissertation paper
- Introduction to Renaissance and Baroque ornamentation (1998)
