= Marija Magdalena (song) =

1999 single by Doris Dragović

Single by Doris Dragović

from the album Krajem vijeka
- Language: Croatian
- English title: Mary Magdalene
- Released: 7 March 1999
- Studio: TM Studio (Zagreb, Croatia)
- Length: 3:03
- Label: Tonika Records; Orfej
- Composer: Tonči Huljić
- Lyricist: Vjekoslava Huljić
- Producer: Tonči Huljić

Doris Dragović singles chronology
"To" (1998)	"Marija Magdalena" (1999)	"Sudnji dan" (1999)

Eurovision Song Contest 1999 entry
- Country: Croatia

Finals performance
- Final result: 4th
- Final points: 118

Entry chronology
- ◄ "Neka mi ne svane" (1998)
- "Kad zaspu anđeli" (2000) ►

Official performance video
- "Marija Magdalena" on YouTube

"Marija Magdalena" (Croatian for 'Mary Magdalene') is a song by Croatian singer Doris Dragović, released on 7 March 1999. It was composed and produced by Tonči Huljić, penned by Vjekoslava Huljić, and arranged by Remi Kazinoti. The song won Dora 1999 and represented Croatia in the Eurovision Song Contest 1999 where it finished in fourth place with 118 points. The song also functioned as the lead single for Dragović's twelfth studio album, titled Krajem vijeka. Within Croatia, the song achieved significant popularity and emerged as one of her most prominent musical successes.

== Background and release ==
Dragović had previously participated in the Eurovision Song Contest when she represented Yugoslavia in 1986 in Bergen, Norway with the song "Željo moja". Her performance secured an 11th place finish with a total of 49 points. Croatia made its debut as an independent country at the 1993 contest.

Since 1995, Dragović has been collaborating with songwriter Tonči Huljić, who would go on to compose "Marija Magdalena" for her twelfth studio album, titled Krajem vijeka. Lyrics were written by Huljić's wife Vjekoslava, and the arrangement was done by Remi Kazinoti. The song was recorded at TM Studio in Zagreb and was officially released on 7 March 1999. It made its debut live performance at Dora 1999 where it won the first prize. Following her victory at Dora, the song was released in CD single format by Tonika Records and Orfej for the Croatian market, and it was also made available through Jupiter Records for the European market. An English version titled "Maria Magdalena" was also recorded and released.

On 8 May 2023, a revised rendition of the song was unveiled, featuring the songwriter Tonči Huljić along with an orchestra in a collaborative effort. Music critic Anđelo Jurkas gave the new version of the song 8 out of 10 stars and was highly positive of the new production calling it a testament of Huljić's mastery on an arrangement, production and orchestral level. He called the rework something that gave the song a completely new and exciting spirit. To promote this version of the song, the duo released a music video directed by Vojan Koceić which also featured Hana Huljić.

== Music video ==
The music video accompanying the song was directed by Katja Restović. Filming took place amidst the springtime of 1999, set against the backdrop of the island of Brač. In the video, Dragović is prominently featured clad in a black dress, delivering her performance at diverse locations throughout the island.

== Eurovision Song Contest ==
=== At Dora ===
On 7 March 1999, Dora 1999, the selection show to find Croatia's Eurovision Song Contest 1999 representative was held. In a field of 24 entries, Dragović was 21st to perform her entry. During the voting sequence the song received 195 points from the regional juries with additionally receiving a set of 12 points from the public thus winning the competition with 207 total points.

=== At Eurovision ===
The song represented Croatia in the Eurovision Song Contest 1999, after it was chosen through Dora 1999. Due to the high number of countries wishing to enter the contest a relegation system was introduced in 1993 in order to reduce the number of countries which could compete in each year's contest. Croatia had a high enough average points total to qualify to the final of the 1999 edition held at the International Convention Center in Jerusalem on 29 May 1999.

The song was performed fourth on the night, following Spain's Lydia with "No quiero escuchar" and preceding the United Kingdom's Precious with "Say It Again". She commenced her performance wearing a white gown and cloak, attire symbolic of the titular Mary Magdalene, while also evoking Milla Jovovich's costume in The Fifth Element (1997) and the image of a Mediterranean diva or goddess. A sole female backing singer, dressed in black, provided vocal support during the performance. As the second verse began, Dragović removed her cloak, revealing a tight bodice. At the close of voting, it had received 118 points, placing fourth of 23.

==== Controversy ====
To manage the increasing number of countries seeking entry, Eurovision introduced an average scoring system, based on each country's previous performance. It was discovered that offstage accompaniment in the form of vocals by a male voice choir, not present on stage, had been used during Dragović's performance. Consequently, Croatia faced a penalty in the form of one-third deduction from its average marks. No deductions were made to the song itself, and thus, the song's placement in the competition accurately reflects the points it was awarded. Huljić has made various remarks in several interviews asserting that the deductions in question were attributed to the song itself. However, this assertion remains unverified and unproven to date. The inquiry into the issue of pre-recorded backing vocals was initiated on behalf of the Norwegian delegation, which was led by Jon Ola Sand.

== Track listing ==
Croatian CD single

1. "Marija Magdalena" – 3:03
2. "Maria Magdalena" (English version) – 3:02
3. "Marija Magdalena" (Instrumental) – 2:48
4. "Marija Magdalena" (Music video)

European CD single

1. "Maria Magdalena" (English version) – 3:02
2. "Marija Magdalena" – 3:03
3. "Marija Magdalena" (Instrumental) – 2:48

== Live performances ==
In addition to its appearances at the Dora and Eurovision events, the song "Marija Magdalena" has become a consistent feature in Dragović's concert repertoire, regularly performed as a solo piece or as part of a medley alongside her other songs in various shows and gigs. As per Dragović's stated practice, she frequently chooses to initiate her concert performances with this song due to its "formal and dramatic attributes", making it a well-suited choice for an opening act. The most recent occasion on which it was employed as the opening piece occurred during her concert held at the Spaladium Arena in Split, commemorating her 40-year career.

On 14 June 2018, during the Golden Studio ceremony, Dragović and Danijela Martinović collaborated in performing a medley featuring a selection of their Eurovision entries, which included "Marija Magdalena", "Željo moja", and "Neka mi ne svane" (1998).

== Legacy ==
The song is widely regarded as one of Croatia's standout Eurovision entries and enjoys substantial support among Eurovision fans and critics. In a 2012 online survey on the Croatian Eurosong website, "Marija Magdalena" was voted as the country's best Eurovision entry. In a May 2018 poll conducted by Eurofest Hrvatska, the Croatian Eurovision Song Contest fan group, "Marija Magdalena" was ranked as the second-best Croatian Eurovision entry, trailing behind Martinović's "Neka mi ne svane".

=== Cover versions ===
The song has undergone several cover versions in recent years, with notable renditions including one by the Russian singer and songwriter Philipp Kirkorov in the year 2000, performed in the Russian language. In 2021, another rendition of the song was presented by Croatian singer Albina Grčić, who represented Croatia in the Eurovision Song Contest 2021. The same year, ToMa, a Croatian singer who had taken part in Dora 2021 also rendered a rendition of the song as part of the Eurosong Od Doma online concert, an event orchestrated by Eurosong.hr.

Furthermore, this song has become a recurring favorite in talent shows across Southeast Europe. It is frequently selected as a showcase for impressive vocal abilities, and it has been featured in various talent competitions, including Zvezde Granda, Supertalent, and Tvoje lice zvuči poznato, among many others.

== Charts ==
=== Weekly charts ===
Chart performance for "Marija Magdalena"
Chart (1999)	Peak position
Croatia (HR Top 20)	1

=== Year-end charts ===
Chart performance for "Marija Magdalena"
Chart (1999)	Peak position
Croatia (HR Top 20)	7
