= The Bižuterija Tour =

2010–12 concert tour by Jelena Rozga

- Regional tour by Jelena Rozga
- Promotional poster for concert at Spaladium Arena in Split, February 2011
- Location: Croatia; Serbia; Bosnia and Herzegovina
- Associated album: Bižuterija
- Start date: 21 October 2010
- End date: 9 November 2012
- No. of shows: 7

Jelena Rozga concert chronology
- The Bižuterija Tour (2010–12); Karlovačko live 2011. (2011)

The Bižuterija Tour was the first headlining solo concert tour by Croatian pop singer Jelena Rozga, in support of her second studio album, Bižuterija (2011). The tour began on 21 October 2010, in Zadar, Croatia, at the Krešimir Ćosić Hall and concluded on 9 November 2012, in Sarajevo, Bosnia and Herzegovina at the Skenderija. In addition to songs from the album, the set list of The Bižuterija Tour also featured songs from the Magazin era and from Rozga's debut studio album, Oprosti Mala (2006). The Bižuterija Tour was a critical and a commercial success; critics praised Rozga for her stage presence and energy and all concerts were sold out shortly after being announced. A documentary titled Hodam na prstima was released in 2011 that includes footage and recordings from concerts of the tour.

== Background ==
Jelena Rozga's second studio album Bižuterija was released in January 2011. Several singles which attained regional commercial success were released from the album, such as "Svega ima al' bi još", "Karantena", "Daj šta daš" and "Rodit ću ti 'ćer i sina". "Bižuterija", the title song of the album, became a huge commercial success and was a turning point in Rozga's career. Bižuterija was a big commercial success, placing first on the official albums chart. Only a month after its release, the album sold 15.000 copies, thus receiving a gold certification by the Croatian Phonographic Association Croatian Phonographic Association. Critical reception of the album, however, was more polarized, with music critics being divided over the quality of the songs. After the success of the title song and the album, Rozga achieved sufficient regional success and reputation to embark on a headlining concert tour.

== Development ==
The Bižuterija Tour began before the official release of the eponymous album. In 2010, Rozga appeared at the Split Music Festival where she performed the song "Bižuterija", which very quickly became a wide commercial success. After the success of the song, Rozga's first hall concert was held at Krešimir Ćosić (known under the name Višnjik) in Zadar. After Višnjik, Rozga performed at the Spaladium Arena in her hometown Split with which she became the first female singer ever to sell out the venue. To promote the concert, she gave an interview to Radio Dalmacija '11 where she spoke about the preparations. Following her performance in Split, she also held concerts in several other major avenues in post-Yugoslav cities. The tour finished with a concert at Skenderija.

During her concerts, Rozga performed songs from her solo career as well as songs from the period when she was the lead singer of Croatian band Magazin. Her concerts also featured guest appearances by many regional singers such as Dražen Zečić, Jole and Klapa Iskon in Zadar and Severina, Jole and Željko Samardžić in Split. With Severina, they sang the song "Prijateljice".

Afterwards, in Zagreb, Rozga's guests were Jole, Klapa Kampanel and Crvena jabuka while in Sarajevo, she was accompanied on stage shortly by Halid Bešlić, Petar Grašo and Mirza Šoljanin. In addition to her music guests, she was accompanied onstage by dancers under the guidance of choreographer Kristina Đanić. All costumes worn by the singer, musicians and dancers were designed by the fashion duo ELFS. As part of the concert tour, Rozga also held mini concerts for expats from the Balkans in New York City, Cleveland, Chicago and Toronto.

== Reception and recordings ==
Concerts were well-received by music critics and the audience. A writer for Index.hr who reviewed a concert at Cibona praised Rozga for her vocal showcase, energy on stage and her interactions with the audience. Many newspapers reported how satisfied the audience also was, noting that Rozga managed to "amaze" them. Reviewing the concert in Sarajevo, a writer of Story.hr wrote that the night was filled with "fun, song, emotions and love" and added that the audience gave back to the singer "with her songs and sincere emotions, and with it she sang every song and every verse in her breath". Tatjana Pacek, writing for Večernji list, observed the highlights of the night included old Magazin songs such as "Kokolo", "Oko moje sanjivo" and "Sve bi seke ljubile mornare"; she felt that the audience was "so loud during the performances" that they almost overpowered the singer herself. Additionally, other concerts were also praised by music critics who applauded Rozga for her energy onstage and her vocal showcase.

The tour was a major commercial success with all concerts being sold-out and Rozga became the first female singer ever to sell out a concert at the Spaladium Arena in Split. The first concert at Višnjik proved to be commercially successful, with tickets being sold to an audience of 5,000 people. At the sold out concert at the Spaladium Arena, Rozga performed to an audience of 12,000 people. The last concert which was part of the tour, held two years after its beginning, was at the Skenderija trade center in front of 10,000 people.

Rozga published the brief documentary titled Hodam na prstima before her concert at Zagreb's Cibona. In the documentary, one can see the progression of Rozga's career starting with excerpts the first music competition she participated in 1992 to excerpts from the Spaladium Arena. Although a live album was not published, footage from the concerts in Zadar and Split were used as music videos for the songs "Bižuterija" and "Ona ili ja".
