= Bižuterija (song) =

Single by Jelena Rozga

from the album Bižuterija
- Released: 11 June 2010
- Recorded: 2010
- Genre: Pop
- Length: 4:21
- Label: Croatia Records
- Songwriter: Vjekoslava Huljić
- Producer: Tonči Huljić

Jelena Rozga singles chronology
"Ima Nade" (2010)	"Bižuterija" (2010)	"Ona Ili Ja" (2010)

Music video
- "Bižuterija" on YouTube

"Bižuterija" (English: Bijouterie) is a song by Croatian pop singer Jelena Rozga from her second studio album of the same name Bižuterija (2011). "Bižuterija" was written by Croatian lyricist and songwriter Vjekoslava Huljić and arranged and produced by Tonči Huljić. "Bižuterija" premiered on Dalbior Petko's show on Croatian broadcasting channel narodni radio in June 2010. It was released as a single through Croatia Records on 11 June 2010. The song had its premiere at the 2010 Split Music Festival after which it quickly became the most-listened song in Croatia and achieved commercial success in the wider Balkan region, particularly in ex-Yugoslav countries.

"Bižuterija" was a turning point in the singer's career and her biggest success at the time of its release. An accompanying music video directed by Željko Petreš premiered on the singer's official YouTube channel on 29 November 2010. The video, filmed during a sold-out concert given at Zadar, Croatia on 21 October 2010 during The Bižuterija Tour (2010-12), shows Rozga singing the song and interacting with the audience. On 24 April 2026, to mark her thirty year celebration of presence in the music industry, Rozga re-released an updated version of the song along with a music video directed by Yassen Grigorov. "Bižuterija" was promoted with numerous live appearances after its release and became the opening and closing song in the set lists of Rozga's tours, live concerts and gigs.

The lyrics "žena, majka, kraljica" ("a woman, a mother, a queen") taken from the song's chorus became a catchphrase among the public on the Balkans and were used to describe a powerful woman who can easily solve life problems. They also gained widespread use as a phrase of support and empowerment among women and as such were used in merchandise.

== Background ==
On 3 June 2010, Jelena Rozga appeared at the 2010 Split Music Festival where she performed "Bižuterija" for the first time. She later presented the studio recorded version of the song on the Dalibor Petko Show broadcast on narodni radio. The audio for the song "Bižuterija" was released on 11 June 2010 through the singer's official YouTube channel.

In 2010, after its debut at the Split Festival, "Bižuterija" became the most played song of the summer and a number-one single both in Croatia and in the whole Balkans.

Rozga revealed during interviews how the song was originally different and she decided not to record it as she did not "feel" it; she had an argument with Tonči Huljić related to the arrangement. He, then, very angry, called her with the song's new and faster-paced arrangement, which Rozga immediately liked. She also revealed how the song lyrically made a metaphor related to betting and poker, which she decided to change as she felt it wouldn't resonate with her audience. The song's notable chorus was also changed after her remarks and last minute, Vjekoslava called them in the studio with the famous "žena, majka, kraljica" part. The song's initial title was supposed to be "Kraljica", but then Nenad Ninčević, the director of Split Festival suggested its current title.

== Lyrical analysis ==
The title song "Bižuterija" carries the name "bijouterie", which is a commonly used fashion accessory. According to Malekinušić Mateo from the Philosophical Faculty of Rijeka, the title song is lyrically polysemic (it can be interpreted in several ways). The first interpretation is as a female protagonist's ode to her former partner. The second interpretation is the female protagonist realizing her own worth, using the metaphor of a diamond ("imao si nisi znao, kako sjaji dijamant"; English: "You had but did not know, how the diamond shines"), to assert her "brilliance", "worth" and "value". A third way of interpretation is through the lyric "Ja sam ti bila privjesak" (English: "I was only a pendant to you"), which describes society's objectification of females, a typically male-view of them as something to be possessed. The last metaphor is in the lyrics "priznaj da sam ja, sve u jednom, žena, majka, žena, majka, kraljica" (English: "Admit that I am, all in one, a woman, a mother, a woman, a mother, a queen") which is a message of female empowerment urging females in modern society to find their strength, to become self-aware of the various roles they play and to make them realize they are not "as helpless as patriarchy wants us to think". Despite realizing that she was "just one more notch" to him, the female protagonist demands respect from her past lover when it comes to what she considers to be her values.

== Music video ==
On 29 November 2010, a music video for "Bižuterija" directed by Željko Petreš was released on the singer's official YouTube channel. The video is taken from a live performance of the singer's sold-out concert in Zadar, Croatia on 21 October 2010 during The Bižuterija Tour (2010-12). The music video opens with camera shots of the venue of the performance. It shows Rozga being prepared for the show by her make-up artist and her crew prepares for the concert. She appears on stage dressed in a black suit and a black hat where she sings the lyrics of the song to her audience, accompanied by a band onstage. The scenes are interspersed with shots of her audience singing the song back to her.

On 24 April 2026, Rozga re-released her song "Bižuterija" along with a music video and updated production by Hrvoje Domazet. She shared how it is one of the songs which "continued living its own life... after so many years it got its new face and new energy". The clip was directed by Bulgarian director Yassen Grigorov and supported by Nestlé Familia HIT by Froneri. It shows Rozga singing the song in a studio, dressed in a white shirt and blue jeans and high heels. She also appears in a sequin gray dress singing on a microphone in front of an audience as well as in a bright red dress.

== Live performances ==
To further promote the song, Rozga performed it during numerous of her live appearances. At the 2011 Porin Awards, Rozga performed the song wearing a blue dress. This performance was later listed as one of the ten most interesting performances at the show in a list compiled by portal Glazba.hr in 2023. At the end of 2010, she appeared at Radio and Television of Montenegro where she gave a performance of "Bižuterija" at the program's New Year's Eve show. In April and May 2011, Rozga gave a performance of "Bižuterija" at the Ruke za Japan humanitarian concert at the Spaladium Arena in Split and during the Magazin In show on TV Pink. That same year, she appeared on the show Tabloid '11 on TV Vojvodina where she again performed the song. In October 2011, Rozga appeared on the Serbian Ami G show where she gave a performance of "Bižuterija". On 21 December 2011, she appeared at the Zvijezde Hit Recordsa '11 show in Zagreb where she performed "Bižuterija". At the beginning of 2012, the singer performed "Bižuterija" on the Croatian program I godina Nova 2012 on the Nova TV Channel and on final show of the Bosnian Zvijezda mozes biti ti '12 at the Zetra Olympic Hall in Sarajevo on 17 February 2012 together with contestant Adan Mulahasanović.

The song was included as the opening song on the singer's set list during many of her concerts in the post-Yugoslav region. On 19 April 2022, she performed an acoustic version of the song, along with Milan Terze on guitar, during one of her live Instagram home concerts held in the midst of the COVID-19 pandemic. She later gave another acoustic performance of the song during the live concert held on 17 May 2020. In 2022 and 2023, the song was included on the set list of the singer's regional Minut Srca Mog Tour; Ivana Lulić from the website Glazba.hr who reviewed a concert of the tour held at the Zagreb Arena on 17 December 2022 pointed it as one of the highlights of the show whose lyrics were sung by the predominantly female audience. Rozga also performed the song live during a concert given at the 2024 Cesarica Awards.

== Recognition and impact ==
"Bižuterija" won the Hit of the Year award at the 2011 Porin Awards, an award that was decided by the audience. The award was the first Rozga received at the show and also, the first award given to a musician from Tonika Records. Rozga's winning of the award was the result of the audience's vote, however, musicians and other nominees at the show reluctantly agreed with the decision and some were against it, deeming it a "song of easy notes". During the event, Rozga admitted that she felt "unwanted" and "uncomfortable" and that her fellow musician colleagues looked at her with contempt which led to her leaving the show in tears. The song was a turning point in the singer's career, leading to a huge increase in her popularity in the entire Balkan region.

The lyrics "žena, majka, kraljica" became a source of inspiration for merchandise and were used in meme pages. Rozga has personally credited the song for "changing her life". Since its release, the song served as the opening song for the singer's live performances, in promotion of albums released at a later stage as well. According to a Croatian Journal writer, even thirteen years after its release "the song did not lose its momentum" being cited, sung and experienced as "the public's own", thus becoming a part of the collective emotion and day-to-day mode of functioning.

== Credits and personnel ==
Information related to the credits and personnel of "Bižuterija" is taken from the single release and YouTube.

- Jelena Rozga – vocals
- Vjekoslava Huljić – songwriting
- Tonči Huljić – music, arrangement
- Hrvoje Domazet - producer (2026 re-release)

2026 music video credits

- Producer: Agencija Flying
- Director: Yassen Grigorov
- D.O.P.: Krasimir Andonov
- Photographer: Temelko Temelkov
- Make-up: Karlo Rusan
- Hairstyle: Zvonimir Franić - Salon Franić
- Styling: Ana Nikačević
