= Bižuterija =

Studio album by Jelena Rozga
- Released: 15 July 2011
- Recorded: 2008 – 2011
- Genre: Pop; folk
- Length: 50:44
- Label: Hit Records; Tonika
- Producer: Tonči Huljić; Remi Kazinoti; Edo Botrić; Stipica Kalogjera

Jelena Rozga studio albums chronology
Oprosti Mala (2006)	Bižuterija (2011)	Best of Jelena Rozga (2011)

Singles from Bižuterija
- 1. "Svega Ima, Al' Bi Još" Released: 2008; 2. "Djevica" Released: 2008; 3. "Daj Šta Daš" Released: 2008; 4. "Ožiljak" Released: 2008; 5. "Rodit' Ću Ti Ćer I Sina" Released: 20 June 2009; 6. "Ima Nade" Released: 21 March 2010; 7. "Bižuterija" Released: 11 June 2010; 8. "Ona Ili Ja" Released: 5 October 2010; 9. "Karantena" Released: 14 December 2010

Bižuterija (English: Bijouterie) is the second studio album by Croatian singer Jelena Rozga. It was released on 15 July 2011, by Hit Records and Tonika Records. As with the singer's previous album Oprosti Mala (2006), most songs from the album were written by the duo Tonči Huljić and Vjekoslava Huljić. All songs were produced by Remi Kazinoti and saw new collaborations, with Edo Botrić, Pero Kozomara and Robert Pilepić. Bižuterija was commercially successful in Croatia where it peaked at number one on the Croatian Albums Chart and received a gold certification by the Croatian Phonographic Industry for sales over 15.000 copies. The album was also critically well received by music critics who saw it as a turning point in her career and an evolution of her sound.

Rozga received two nominations for the album at the 2011 Porin Awards in the categories for Hit of the Year for the song "Bižuterija" and Best Pop Music Album. She ended up winning the former award which was followed by a controversy from other participants at the contest. To promote the album, nine singles were released, including commercially successful ones "Svega Ima, Al' Bi Još", "Daj Šta Daš", "Rodit' Ću Ti Ćer I Sina", "Ima Nade", "Karantena", "Ona Ili Ja". The title song, emerged as the most commercially successful one and the biggest hit in her career.

Following the release of the album, Rozga embarked on a regional tour titled The Bižuterija Tour (2011–12). It was highly successful throughout the Balkans, and with the sold-out concert at the Spaladium Arena in her hometown Split, Rozga became the first ever female artist to have such an achievement. She additionally promoted Bižuterija with live televised performances of her songs in the region and co-headlined the Karlovačko live 2011. tour with Bajaga i Instruktori in November and December. The album marked a turning point in the singer's solo career which propelled her forward in the music industry.

== Background and release ==
Jelena Rozga released her debut studio album Oprosti Mala in 2006 which marked her first solo release after ten years spent as the lead singer of the pop band Magazin. The album debuted at number one on the Croatian Albums Chart in the 31st week on the chart and received a gold certification by the Croatian Phonographic Industry. The single "Gospe Moja" released from the album was commercially successful in Croatia and the Balkan region, having reached the top of several radio station charts. After the success of "Gospe Moja" and "Nemam", the Croatian entry for Dora 2007, Rozga decided to re-release Oprosti Mala in September 2007 to include those songs. After the song "Gospe Moja", Rozga decided to further pursue the Dalmatian-Greek melody musically characteristic of the song.

In June 2010, during the Dalibor Petko Show on narodni radio, Rozga first presented her song "Bižuterija", with which she performed at the 2010 Split Music Festival held on 3 June. Together with the release of the song, Rozga announced the release of the second studio album as 15 September 2010. The album was not eventually released in September as initially announced. Rozga, nevertheless embarked on The Bižuterija Tour in the autumn of 2010 with a concert at the Krešimir Ćosić Hall in Zadar (Višnjik) and the following major concert was announced in Spaladium Arena in Split. The record label Hit Records announced through a brief post on 18 January 2011 that Bižuterija would soon be released. In January 2011, before the concert at the Arena, Rozga released her album Bižuterija. It was made available for digital download on 15 July 2011 through the iTunes Store. It was also made available for streaming on the music streaming service Deezer on 28 July 2011 and it was uploaded on YouTube on 1 May 2013.

== Content ==
Every woman is a queen, all deserve a queen's treatment. Us women have to have it nice and men have to take care of us. We cannot let anyone treat us as bijouterie, only as pure gold!

— Rozga, interview with newspaper on the lyrics behind the title song

The album features 14 songs written by Tonči Huljić and Vjekoslava Huljić, a duo which the singer worked with on her previous studio album Oprosti Mala (2006), as well as on other songs with the group Magazin. Only the album's fifth track titled "Ona Ili Ja" was written by Pero Kozomara and Robert Pilepić. Additionally, Remi Kazinoti served as the producer for all songs with the exception of "Djevica" which was produced by Edo Botrić. The album features two featured artists, the first one being Željko Samardžić on the song "Ima Nade" ad the second one Croatian band Klapa Iskon on "Ostavit' Ću Svitlo". The last song on the album is the bonus track "Aha", which was originally Rozga's first public performance that took place at the 1996 Dora, the Croatian national competition for the entry of the Eurovision Song Contest, where she won the second place. During an interview with Montenegrin newspaper Vijesti in February 2011, Rozga introduced the album as the "best one in all the years of my music career".

The title song "Bižuterija" carries the name "bijouterie", which is a commonly used fashion accessory. According to Malekinušić Mateo from the Philosophical Faculty of Rijeka, the title song is lyrically polysemic (it can be interpreted in several ways). The first interpretation is as a female protagonist's ode to her former partner. The second interpretation is the female protagonist realizing her own worth, using the metaphor of a diamond ("imao si nisi znao, kako sjaji dijamant"; English: "You had but did not know, how the diamond shines"), to assert her "brilliance", "worth" and "value". A third way of interpretation is through the lyric "Ja sam ti bila privjesak" (English: "I was only a pendant to you"), which describes society's objectification of females, a typically male-view of them as something to be possessed. The last metaphor is in the lyrics "priznaj da sam ja, sve u jednom, žena, majka, žena, majka, kraljica" (English: "Admit that I am, all in one, a woman, a mother, a woman, a mother, a queen") which is a message of female empowerment urging females in modern society to find their strength, to become self-aware of the various roles they play and to make them realize they are not "as helpless as patriarchy wants us to think". Despite realizing that she was "just one more notch" to him, the female protagonist demands respect from her past lover when it comes to what she considers to be her values. The song's working title was "Privjesak" and the singer admitted that "fell in love" at the first listen. "Rodit' Ću Ti Ćer I Sina" announces the female protagonist's love to her soul mate and is a celebration of the security of family life. During the chorus, she professes that she is convinced to live one hundred years with him.

== Promotion ==
=== Singles ===
To promote the album, the singer released a total of nine singles all with varying degree of success on the HR Top 40. "Djevica" was released as a single after a live debut at the CMC Festival 2008 in Pula on 16 May. "Daj Šta Daš" was released as the album's third single. It was chosen as the most listened song in Croatia in 2008. It also received the Grand Prix Award the next summer. "Svega Ima, Al' Bi Još" was released as a standalone single in 2009 and received wide popularity in the country. To further promote the song, Rozga performed it at the 2009 Hrvatski Radijski Festival held in Opatija on 29 May. "Ožiljak" was released as the album's fourth single with a premiere performance taking place on the Nad lipom show in October 2008. The single was further promoted at the fourteenth edition of Montenegrin show Sunčane Skale, at Operacija trijumf together with contestant Sonja Bakic, at the show Zlatne žice Slavonije and at TV Bingo Show, all in 2008.

"Rodit' Ću Ti Ćer I Sina" was released as a single on 20 June 2009. The song was performed live for the first time at the 2009 Split Music Festival in July 2009. At the end of the year, it emerged as the most listened song on Prokurativ in Croatia. "Ima Nade" was released as the album's sixth single on 21 March 2010. The music video directed by Željko Petreš was released on 25 May 2010. The audio for the song "Bižuterija" was released on 11 June 2010. A music video for the song directed by Zeljko Petres showing footage from the singer's performance at Spaladium Arena was released on 29 November 2010. The music video broke the record for a most-watched video by the singer at the time of its release. The single quickly became Rozga's best-performing song in the entire ex-Yugoslav region and was very well received by the audience. Additionally, "Bižuterija" became a commercially successful single both in Croatia and the region.

The audio of "Karantena" was released on 14 December 2010 on the singer's official YouTube channel. The music video for "Karantena" was filmed sometime in February 2011 at different locations of the Radisson Blue hotel in Split and was directed by Željko Petreš. The song was released as the album's eighth single. During the COVID-19 pandemic and the related quarantines and curfews imposed by governments in an attempt to stop its spread, the song became popular on social media among listeners again. "Ona Ili Ja" was released as the album's ninth and last single on 5 October 2010.

=== The Bižuterija Tour and live performances ===
To further promote the album in the Balkans, Rozga embarked on The Bižuterija Tour (2010-2012). The tour started with a concert in Zadar, Croatia on 21 October 2010 and finished at Skenderija in Sarajevo on 9 November 2012. After performing in Zadar, Rozga also gave a performance in her hometown Split in front of an audience of 12.000 people on 11 February 2011. with which she became the first female artist ever to sell out the Spaladium Arena. Other cities the tour visited included Belgrade at the Sava Center on 11 November 2011, which marked the singer's first performance as a solo artist in the city. The tour was a major commercial success selling out all venues. It further received praise from both music critics and the audience for the high energy and vocal showcase by the singer. Additionally, Rozga also performed songs from the album during the co-headlining Karlovačko live 2011. tour with Bajaga i Instruktori which took place in November and December 2011 and visited several cities in Bosnia and Herzegovina and Croatia.

To further promote the album and its singles, Rozga gave several televised performances. She first performed "Ima Nade" together with Željko Samardžić and "Rodit Ću Ti Ćer I Sina" at the TV Bingo Show 2010 in April. Rozga appeared again together with Samardžić at the Radijski Festival '10 in May 2010 where they performed "Ima Nade" together. On 20 December 2010, Rozga appeared at the Tulum svih tuluma - Zvijezde Hit Recordsa Show in Zagreb where she performed "Rodit Ću Ti Ćer I Sina" and "Daj Šta Daš". At the end of 2010, she appeared at Radio and Television of Montenegro where she gave a performance of "Rodit Ću Ti Ćer I Sina", "Bižuterija", "Ožiljak", "Ona Ili Ja" and "Daj Šta Daš" at the program's New Year's Eve show. In April and May 2011, Rozga gave a performance of "Bižuterija" at the Ruke za Japan humanitarian concert at the Spaladium Arena in Split and during the Magazin In show on TV Pink. She performed "Sad Il' Nikad" at the Dani hrvatskog turizma '11. In November of the same year, she also appeared on the Serbian show Promocija on DM Sat where she performed "Rodit Ću Ti Ćer I Sina", "Sad Il' Nikad", "Ožiljak" and "Daj Šta Daš". That same year, she appeared on the show Tabloid '11 on TV Vojvodina where she performed "Daj Šta Daš", "Bižuterija" and "Grizem". On 21 December 2011, she again appeared at the Zvijezde Hit Recordsa '11 show in Zagreb where she performed "Daj Šta Daš" and "Bižuterija". At the beginning of 2012, the singer performed "Bižuterija" on the Croatian program I godina Nova 2012 on the Nova TV Channel and on final show of the Bosnian Zvijezda mozes biti ti '12 at the Zetra Olympic Hall in Sarajevo on 17 February 2012 together with contestant Adan Mulahasanović. The singer also appeared on the Bosnian show Večernjakov pečat in March 2013 where she performed "Ona Ili Ja".

== Reception and impact ==
The album is seen as a turning point in the singer's career after which her popularity increased rapidly. It was also seen as a more representative image of her persona as compared to her previous work. The album peaked at number one on the Croatian Albums Chart in the first week of its release. It was certified gold by the Croatian Phonographic Industry for selling over 15.000 copies in the country within the first month of its release. According to an interview Rozga gave after the release of the album, "Grizem", "Sad Il' Nikad'" and "Karantena" were all well received by the audience.

The title song from the album "Bižuterija", won in the Hit of the Year award at the 2011 Porin Awards, an award that was decided by the audience. The award was the first Rozga received at the show and also, the first award given to a musician from Huljić's record label. Rozga's winning of the award was the result of the audience's vote, however, musicians and other nominees at the show reluctantly agreed with the decision and some were against it, deeming it a "song of easy notes". During the event, Rozga admitted that she felt "unwanted" and "uncomfortable" and that her fellow musician colleagues looked at her with contempt which led to her leaving the show in tears. The album and the eponymous title track were a turning point in the singer's career; they both led to an increase in her popularity and success. The lyrics "žena, majka, kraljica" became a source of inspiration for merchanise and were used in meme pages. Rozga has personally credited the song for "changing her life". Since its release, the song served as the opening song for the singer's live performances, in promotion of albums released at a later stage as well.

In 2021, the album was dubbed to be the singer's "legendary" release. Additionally, critics have seen it as an album that cemented her status as "pop queen" in the Croatian scene.

== Track listing ==
Standard edition
No.	Title	Writer(s)	Producer(s)	Length
1.	"Karantena"	Tonči Huljić; Vjekoslava Huljić	Remi Kazinoti	3:35
2.	"Grizem"	Huljić; Huljić	Kazinoti	4:04
3.	"Sad Il' Nikad"	Huljić; Huljić	Kazinoti	3:24
4.	"Bižuterija"	Huljić; Huljić	Kazinoti	4:10
5.	"Ona Ili Ja"	Pero Kozomara; Robert Pilepić	Kazinoti	3:36
6.	"Ima Nade (featuring Željko Samardžić)"	Huljić; Huljić	Kazinoti	3:33
7.	"Rodit Ću Ti Ćer I Sina"	Huljić; Huljić	Kazinoti	3:44
8.	"Daj Šta Daš"	Huljić; Huljić	Kazinoti	3:26
9.	"Svega Ima, Al' Bi Još"	Huljić; Huljić	Kazinoti	3:31
10.	"Djevica"	Huljić; Huljić	Edo Botrić	3:50
11.	"Ožiljak"	Huljić; Huljić	Kazinoti	3:37
12.	"Ostavit' Ću Svitlo (featuring Klapa Iskon)"	Huljić; Huljić	Kazinoti	3:51

Bonus tracks
No.	Title	Writer(s)	Producer(s)	Length
13.	"Sad Il' Nikad (Club Remix)"	Huljić; Huljić	Kazinoti	3:31
14.	"Aha"	Huljić; Huljić	Stipica Kalogjera	2:58
Total length:				50:44

== Credits and personnel ==
Credits and personnel are adapted from the album's liner notes and Discogs.

- Jelena Rozga – vocals (all tracks), liner notes
- Edo Botrić – arrangement (tracks: 10)
- Remi Kazinoti – arrangement (tracks: 1 to 9, 11 to 13)
- Stipica Kalogjera – arrangement (tracks: 14)
- Alenka Milano – backing vocals
- Brankica Brodarić – backing vocals
- Hana Huljić – backing vocals
- Vesna Ivić – backing vocals
- Maja Vidović – design
- Zlatko Brodarić – guitar
- Ivan Huljić – keyboards
- Remi Kazinoti – keyboards, producer
- Robert Pilepić – lyrics (tracks: 5)
- Vjekoslava Huljić – lyrics (tracks: 1 to 4, 6 to 14)
- Pero Kozomara – music (tracks: 5)
- Tonči Huljić – music (tracks: 1 to 4, 6 to 14), publishing, supervision
- Kristina Krajna – publishing
- Gordana Labović – photography

== Charts ==
Chart performance for Bižuterija
Chart (2011)	Peak position
Croatian Album Chart (HDU)	1

== Certifications and sales ==
Certifications of Bižuterija
Region	Certification	Certified units/sales
Croatia (HDU)	Gold	15.000

== Release history ==
Bižuterija release history
Region	Date	Format	Label	Ref.
Various	15 July 2011	digital download	Croatia; Hit Records	
Various	28 July 2011	Streaming	Deezer	
Various	1 May 2013	Streaming	YouTube	
