= Tedi Spalato =

Dalmatian singer-songwriter

Tadija Bajić
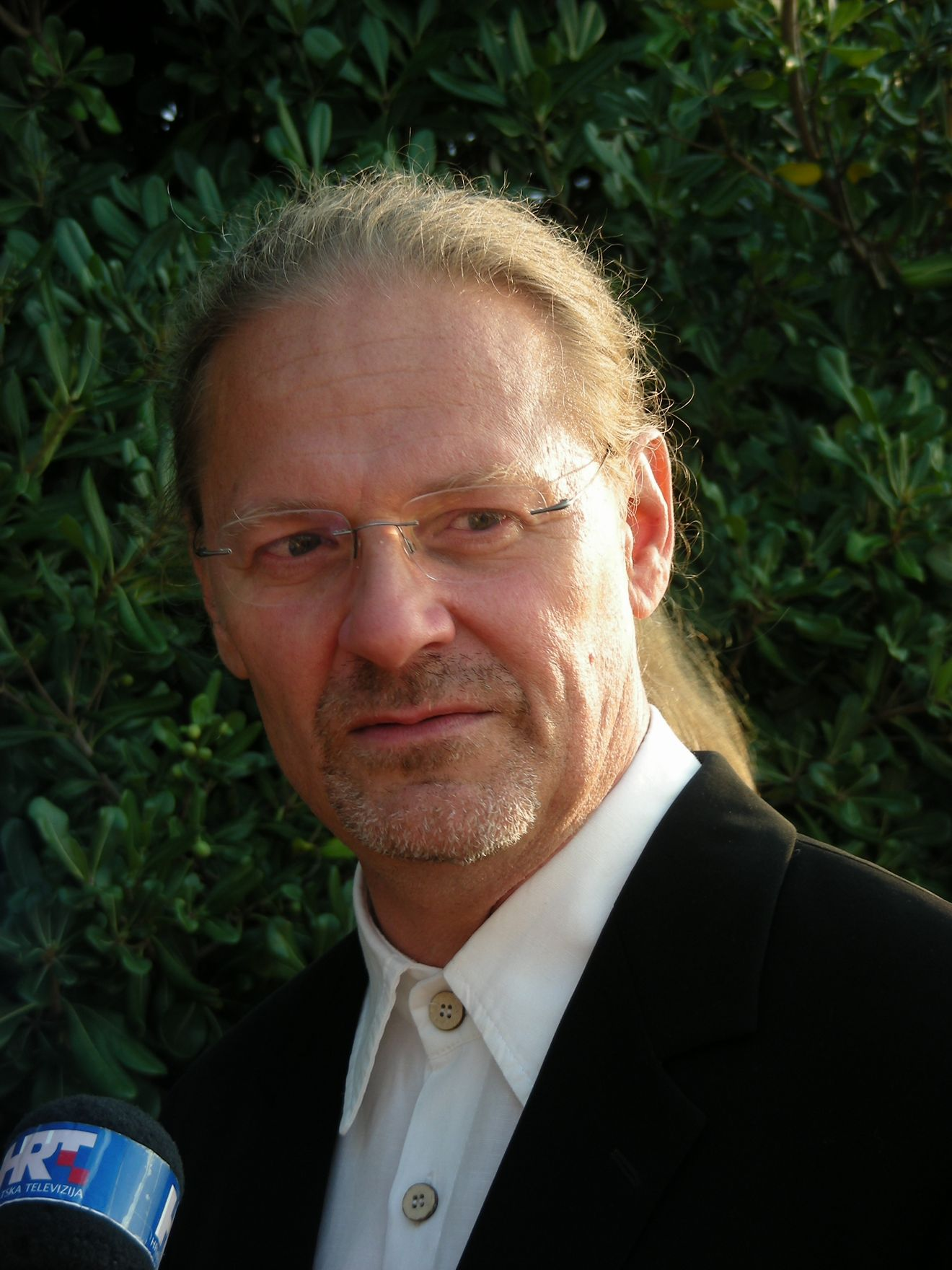

Background information
- Also known as: Tedi Spalato
- Born: 28 April 1954 (age 72); Split, PR Croatia, FPR Yugoslavia
- Genres: Dalmatian music, ethno, jazz, World music
- Occupation: Singer
- Instrument: Vocals
- Years active: 1972-present
- Label: Scardona
- Formerly of: More
- Website: https://www.scardona.hr/bio-tedi-spalato

Tedi Spalato (birthname Tadija Bajić; 28 April 1954) is a Dalmatian singer-songwriter of pop music, composer, instrumentalist and music producer. Born and raised in Split, Spalato got exposed to the local musical styles and theater work from a very young age. In his teenage years, he joined ensemble Anima to explore spiritual and jazz music and was part of the group More until 1985.

His music is in typical Dalmatian style with intimate poetic lyrics mostly revolving around love. His music has been described as a combination of jazz, ethno and World music. In the span of his career, he has released seven studio albums and one live album. He has also received three Porin Award for his work.

== Early life and childhood ==
Tadija Bajić was born on 28 April 1954 in Split, Croatia in the Croatian region of Dalmatia to parents who were amateurs in music. Growing up and owing to his childhood friend, Spalato listened to Dalmatian songs by Ljubo Stipišić and Marinko Katunarić, songs by Dalmatian music ensembles klapas and when going to the theater, he listened to classical music, ballet, opera, operettes and symphonic concerts. He also got exposed to jazz music through the albums his friend had sent to him by a cousin in the United States.

== Career ==
=== 1972-1985: Career beginnings and More ===
Until he was 18, Spalato played and sang in local klapas and groups after which he joined the ensemble Anima through which he studied Black spiritual and jazz music. Until 1982 he was a studio musician and joined the band More, in which he was together with musicians who later became widely successful, including Oliver Dragojević, Meri Cetinić, Jasmin Stavros, Doris Dragović and Remi Kazinoti. In 1985, he embarked on a solo career. He has participated in home and other festivals of popular music. At the same time while he was working on his solo career, he also played in operettes, drama and ballet shows at Croatian National Theatre, Split. He has performed in numerous festivals, most notably at the Split Festival where he was present since the 1980s.

=== 2022-present: Ime mi je nevažno and other projects ===
On 19 April 2022, Spalato performed the song "Ispočetka" at the Zagreb Festival. Later, on 21 December he released the single "Ime mi je nevažno" with lyrics by Antonela Ozretić and production by Spalato and Leo Škaro. At the same time, he released his sixth studio album titled Ime mi je nevažno. On it, he appeared as a co-author on four songs. Upon its release, the album was very positively reviewed by Ivana Lulić from Glazba.hr who felt that it successfully sublimed all of "his thoughts, feelings and wisdom which he gathered on the way and the lyrics with which he resonates". She also called the album one that "creates mental Dalmatian images, calls exploring aloneness and turns the attention to the fleetingness of time, human life and love". At the 2023 Porin Awards, the album won in the category for Best Pop Album.

On 1 January 2026, he caught media attention by performing in New York City together with a street saxophonist, sharing how they bonded over music without speaking the same language on his Instagram page.

== Private life ==
Tedi Spalato lives in Solin. As of 2021, he made it known to the public that he is in a relationship with Branka Štegl, a yoga and pilates instructor. The two met at the gym and decided to live as neighbours in order to give each other space. Prior to her, Spalato was in a relationship with ballet dancer Lidija Kroker since 1989, and she appeared as an actress in several music videos of his. They split up after 20 years of dating. During an interview, he shared how one of his main hobby includes cooking.

== Discography ==
=== More band ===
- Hajde da se mazimo (1983)

=== Solo material ===
- Dalmatinska pismo moja (1998)
- Ponoćka (EP - 1999)
- Live in Lisinski (2000)
- Kao da se vrime (2001)
- Dalmatinska pismo moja - re-release (The Best Of) (2003)
- Lipote gladan, ljubavi žedan (2005)
- Kadenca (2009)
- Ime mi je nevažno (2022)

=== Producer work ===
- "Zvona zvone" - Ljupka Dimitrovska (1990)

=== Singles ===
- "Konoba" (with Meri Cetinić)
- "Dalmatino povišću pritrujena" (with Josip Genda)
- "Dobro ti more bilo"
- "Sve ću preživit"
- "More snova"
- "Lipote gladan, ljubavi žedan"
