= Zar je ljubav spala na to =

2001 song by Magazin

Single by Magazin featuring Tifa

from the album Best Of..., Vol. 1
- Released: 2001
- Recorded: 2001
- Genre: Pop
- Length: 4:20
- Label: Croatia Records
- Composer: Tonči Huljić
- Lyricist: Vjekoslava Huljić
- Producer: Fedor Boić

Magazin singles chronology
"Hrvatska rapsodija" (2001)	"Zar je ljubav spala na to" (2001)	"Bol" (2001)

Tifa singles chronology
"Zar je ljubav spala na to" (2001)

Music video
- "Zar je ljubav spala na to" on YouTube

"'Zar je ljubav spala na to (Obećanja)" (Has Love Come to That (Promises)) is a song by Croatian pop band Magazin featuring Bosnian rock singer Mladen Vojičić Tifa. It was written by Tonči and Vjekoslava Huljić. It was released as a single through Croatia Records in 2001, as the lead single from Magazin's greatest hits album Best Of..., Vol. 1. The song was well received by both of the singers' fanbases. Commercially, the song achieved success in Croatia and the wider Yugoslav region. A music video was released which features the band and both of the lead vocalists singing the song along with scenes from the 2000 movie What Women Want. As of September 2022, it has over 1.5 million views on the video-streaming platform YouTube.

In 2022, Rozga re-released the song in an acoustic version featuring Croatian pop singer Matija Cvek for her fourth studio album and first acoustic album titled Minut Srca Mog (2022). The rework fared well on the Croatian airplay chart where it managed to peak at number 4 in the week of its release. A music video directed by Dario Radusin was also released on 15 September showing the duo singing the song together on the streets of Zagreb and in a studio. The acoustic rework was performed live at the singer's concerts during the Minut Srca Mog Tour (2022–23) and during televised appearances.

== Background and live performances ==
In 2001, Jelena Rozga served as the main vocal of the famous pop band Magazin while Mladen Vojičić Tifa was the former member of the popular Yugoslav rock band Bijelo dugme. They collaborated on "Zar je ljubav spala na to" whose music was arranged by Tonči Huljić and whose lyrics were written by Vjekoslava Huljić. A music video for the single was also released. It shows Rozga singing the lyrics in front of a bridge and a factory, the rest of the band driving a vintage car and Tifa singing the song on rocks and in front of a factory. Excerpts and scenes from the movie What Women Want (2000) starring Mel Gibson are also interspersed in the clip. Towards the end, both Magazin and Tifa can be seen singing and accompanied by instruments in a warehouse.

The group performed "Zar je ljubav spala na to" together with Tifa during a live televised appearance on Hrvatska radiotelevizija. In 2015, she appeared on the nineteenth episeode of the seventh season of the Ami G show in Serbia where she sang acoustic versions of "Minut srca mog" and "Zar je ljubav spala na to" accompanied by Marinko Madžgalj and Ognjen on guitar. On 26 April 2020, during a live online concert that Jelena Rozga released on her Instagram and YouTube channels during the COVID pandemic, she performed an acoustic version of "Zar je ljubav spala na to" accompanied by Milan Terze on guitar.

== 2022 rework ==
"Zar je ljubav spala na to"
- iTunes digital single cover

Single by Jelena Rozga featuring Matija Cvek

from the album Minut srca mog
- Released: 15 September 2022
- Recorded: 2020–2022
- Genre: Pop
- Length: 4:24
- Label: Croatia Records
- Composer: Tonči Huljić
- Lyricist: Vjekoslava Huljić
- Producer: Srđan "Skansi" Sekulović

Jelena Rozga singles chronology
"Ti i ja" (2021)	"Zar je ljubav spala na to" (2022)	"Grizem" (2022)

Matija Cvek singles chronology
"Trebaš li me" (2022)	"Zar je ljubav spala na to" (2022)	"Ne moram ni ja" (2022)

Music video
- "Zar je ljubav spala na to" on YouTube

=== Background and reception ===
In August 2022, Rozga confirmed during interviews and on her Instagram account that her then-upcoming acoustic album would open with an acoustic rework of "Zar je ljubav spala na to" featuring Croatian pop vocalist Matija Cvek; a music video for the rework was also announced. Rozga's idea to collaborate with the singer came after she heard his cover of her single "Suze biserne" during his live concerts. It was then her initiative for the two to record the cover. During an interview, Cvek revealed that the collaboration was out of his "comfort zone", as it represents a different genre from his usual discography. The rework, produced by Srđan Sekulović – Skansi was released on 15 September 2022.

Upon its release, the song was well received by the press who commended Cvek's vocals and demonstration of singing talent on the song. Fans were more divided in their response; while some felt that the duo's vocals worked well together, others felt it fell short to the original featuring Tifa. In October 2022, the song was nominated in the category Hit of September at the 2022 Cesarica Awards which it also won. In December 2022, the song was nominated in the category for Best Collaboration at the 2023 Music Awards in Serbia.

The song was included on the set list of the singer's regional Minut Srca Mog Tour (2022–23), where Cvek made a guest appearance at a concert of the tour held at the Zagreb Arena on 17 December 2022. The duo appeared together with Tonči Huljić i Madre Badessa Band at the Cesarica Awards in 2022 and performed the song live together in a medley with the band's "Baci oko na mene". He also joined her together for the performance of the song during her concert on 7 April 2023 as part of the Minut Srca Mog Tour (2022–23); this marked Cvek's first performance at a concert in Serbia and served as his presentation to the audience.

=== Music video ===
A music video directed by Dario Radusin was released on 15 September 2022 on the singer's official YouTube channel. The photography for the clip was finalized by Petar Vilović, while the singer's makeup and styling were made by Saša Joković, Mijo Majhen and Envy Room. In the visuals, the two singers can be seen walking on the streets of Zagreb as well as lip-syncing to the lyrics in artful settings. Critics and the press dubbed the clip "intimate" as the two singers are seen exchanging "affectionate looks and touches" with each other. Within a week of its release, the video garnered 400.000 views and it appeared on the third position of trending videos on YouTube in Croatia. As of November 2022, the video has been watched over 1 million times on the platform.

=== Charts ===
The single featuring Matija Cvek was commercially successful on the HR Top 40, the country's airplay chart, where it debuted and peaked at number four for the week ending 29 August 2022. The following week, it moved to the fourteenth position on the same chart. It spent a total of 11 weeks on the chart, most of them in the top 20, as of week ending 7 November 2022.

Chart performance for "Zar je ljubav spala na to"
Chart (2022)	Peak position
Croatia (HR Top 40)	4

=== Credits and personnel ===
Credits are taken from the video description of the official music video for "Zar je ljubav spala na to" on YouTube.

Song credits

- Tonči Huljić – music
- Vjekoslava Huljić – lyrics
- Srđan Sekulović Skansi – arrangement and production
- Davor Petrović – guitar
- Mario Ferin – piano
- Ivica Ciban – bass guitar
- Nebojša Škrgić – drums
- Ivana Čabraja – backing vocals

Video credits

- Director: Dario Radusin
- Photography: Petar Vilović
- Make-up: Saša Joković
- Hairstyle: Mijo Majhen
- Jelena Rozga styling: Envy Room
