= Karlovačko live 2011. =

2011 concert tour by Jelena Rozga and Bajaga i instruktori

- Regional tour by Jelena Rozga and Bajaga i instruktori
- Associated album: Bižuterija
- Start date: 27 November 2011
- End date: 28 December 2011
- No. of shows: 10

Jelena Rozga and Bajaga i instruktori concert chronology
- The Bižuterija Tour (2010–12); Karlovačko live 2011. (2011); Minut Srca Mog Tour (2022–23)

Karlovačko live 2011. was a co-headlining concert tour by Croatian pop singer Jelena Rozga and Serbian rock band Bajaga i instruktori. The tour was embarked on 27 November 2011 in Split, Croatia at the Spaladium Arena, and concluded on 28 December of the same year in Pula, at the Mate Parlov Sport Centre.

== Background ==
Karlovačko live is a common denomination for music projects related to the Karlovačko bear. The tradition of the project began in 2002 with Zucchero's concert in Pula. In 2004, Karlovačko live served as the debut for Miroslav Škoro and Prljavo kazalište. A year afterwards, Severina and Crvena jabuka were performing shows in 12 Croatian cities and in 2006, Karlovačko gathered three performers: Tony Cetinski, Saša Lošić and Gazde. In 2007, for the first time in Croatia, several performers from Bijelo dugme performed: Željko Bebek, Alen Islamović and Mladen Vojičić "Tifa", while the Karlovačko live tour of 2008 was given by Prljavo kazalište, the band which celebrated their 30th birthday at Karlovačko live. In 2009., the Karlovačko live tour was represented by Parni valjak and in 2010, Halid Bešlić and Crvenu jabuku.

== Tour ==
The tour was announced during a press conference on 25 September 2010 in the Zagreb club called H2O. Entry tickets started being sold on 26 September as part of the band Eventim. As part of the tour, nine concerts were held in Croatia and one in Bosnia and Herzegovina.

== Dates and locations ==
| Date | City | Country | Location |
|---|---|---|---|
| 27 November 2011 | Split | Croatia | Spaladium Arena |
| 2 December 2011 | Široki Brijeg | Bosnia and Herzegovina | Dvorana Pecara |
| 4 December 2011 | Zadar | Croatia | Višnjik |
| 9 December 2011 | Varaždin | Croatia | Varaždin Arena |
| 11 December 2011 | Osijek | Croatia | Dvorana Gradski vrt |
| 16 December 2011 | Zagreb | Croatia | Arena Zagreb |
| 18 December 2011 | Rijeka | Croatia | Dvorana Mladosti |
| 26 December 2011 | Bjelovar | Croatia | Školsko-sportska dvorana |
| 27 December 2011 | Karlovac | Croatia | Sportska dvorana Mladost |
| 28 December 2011 | Pula | Croatia | Mate Parlov Sport Centre |
