= Hari Rončević =

Croatian pop singer

- Born: 9 December 1963 (age 62); Split, SR Croatia, SFR Yugoslavia
- Occupation: Singer
- Years active: 1990s–present

Hari Rončević (born 9 December 1963) is a Croatian pop singer and songwriter. He was born in Split, in former Yugoslavia.

After living for 13 years in Zagreb, he returned to his native Split in 2020.

In 2019, he drew media attention for singing live his own version of Marko Perković Thompson's "Bojna Čavoglave".

Rončević has released a total 16 albums. He collaborated with many artists, notably Doris Dragović, Alen Vitasović, Meri Cetinić and Klapa Cambi.
