= Oprosti Mala =

Studio album by Jelena Rozga
- Released: August 2006
- Recorded: 2006–2007
- Genre: Pop
- Length: 57:32
- Label: Croatia Records; Tonika
- Producer: Remi Kazinoti

Jelena Rozga chronology
Oprosti Mala (2006)	Bižuterija (2011)

Singles from Oprosti Mala
- 1. "Oprosti Mala" Released: 2006; 2. "Ne Zovi Me Marija" Released: 2006; 3. "Ja Znam Dobro što Mi Je" Released: 2006; 4. "Sve Se Meni Čini" Released: 2006; 5. "Nemam" Released: 2007; 6. "Gospe Moja" Released: 2007

Oprosti Mala is the debut studio album by Croatian pop singer Jelena Rozga. The album was released through the record label Croatia Records in 2006. It included songs written and arranged by several musicians and songwriters, among which Tonči Huljić, Đorđe Novković, Vjekoslava Huljić, Željko Pavičić and Remi Kazinoti, the last of whom is also the main producer of the album.

The first edition of Oprosti Mala includes ten songs, including three remixes. The re-edition of the album, released in 2007, contains two new songs, "Nemam" and "Gospe moja". Six singles were released from the album: "Oprosti Mala", "Ne Zovi Me Marija, "Ja Znam Dobro Što Mi Je", "Sve Se Meni Čini Da", "Nemam" and "Gospe Moja". The last song received that Grand Prix Award at the Split Festival. The album was critically and commercially successful, peaking at the top of the Croatian Albums Chart. To promote the album, Rozga performed many of the songs live.

== Background ==
From 1996 to 2006, Rozga served as the lead singer of the famous Croatian pop band Magazin, having released a total of five studio albums together with them. The group released their fifth studio album with the singer, titled Paaa..? (2004). In promotion of the album, they performed its singles at the Split Music Festival and received several awards. The album was a commercial success, having sold over 28.000 copies in Croatia and received a gold certification. In 2005 and 2006, the band worked on its promotion through concerts and gigs in the Balkan region.

Towards 2006, record label Croatia Records announced through a press release that the singer would go on to pursue a solo career but would continue singing with the band until September of the same year. In 2006, Rozga performed at the 2006 Dora national festival, Croatia's show for the Eurovision Song Contest, performing the song "Oprosti Mala". That performance is considered the "farewell" performance of the group. Namely, the same day, Rozga also appeared performing under her name with the song "Ne Zovi Me Marija" and thus announced her solo career. The summer of the same year, she performed the song "Ja Znam Dobro Što Mi Je" at the Split Music Festival. During a later interview, Rozga revealed how the song, like most of the album "went unnoticed" at the time of the release. On 20 July 2006, Croatia Records announced the release of the album through a press release. On 9 August 2006, the album Oprosti Mala was released through Croatia Records.

In 2007, she performed the songs "Nemam" at the Dora, for which she was joined on stage by Zlatko Pejaković and "Gospe Moja" at the Split Festival. After the success of "Gospe Moja" and "Nemam", Rozga decided to re-release Oprosti Mala to include those songs. On 1 September 2007, Oprosti Mala was re-released in an edition which included the aforementioned two songs besides all previously released songs.

== Music and lyrics ==
The standard edition of the album contains 13 new songs, while the re-edition contained 15 songs. Most songs were produced and written by the Huljić duo, consisting of Vjekoslava Huljić and Tonči Huljić; only the songs "Roza Boja" and "Sve Mi Tvoje Oči Govore" were written by Đorđe Novković and Željko Pavičić. Greek producer Remi Kazinoti was the producer of all songs. Despite the original songs, the album also featured two covers including "Bilo Bi Super", a reworked version of a single by the group Magazin when Danijela Martinović was the lead singer and "Lijepa Samo Za Tebe", a cover of the song "I Could Fall in Love" (1995) by the Mexican-American singer Selena Quintanilla. The album included three remixes produced by music producer Motiwwwo of the songs "Bilo Bi Super", "Oprosti Mala" and "Ne Zovi Me Marija".

Musically, Oprosti Mala is a pop record similar to Magazin's style when Rozga served as the band's lead singer. According to the press release in support of the album, it shows a different image of the singer. "Gospe Moja" was the exception as it featured a renowned traditional Dalmatian sound. The song is written in the form of a prayer to Mother Mary by the female protagonist longing for the right male counterpart.

== Promotion ==
Six singles were released in promotion of the album. The title song, "Oprosti Mala" and "Ne Zovi Me Marija" were released as the first and second single from the album, respectively. Rozga performed both songs at the 2006 Dora competition and they quickly gained popularity.

"Sve Se Meni Čini" was released as the album's fourth single. A music video for the song, directed by Zoran Pezo and produced by the company Plavi Film premiered on 1 October 2006 on the Croatian Music Channel. It is meant as a romantic clip, which shows Rozga singing the song seated, while animations of the four seasons changing in the background are also shown.

"Nemam" was released as the album's fifth single. It achieved popularity among the singer's audience.

The single "Gospe Moja" released as the sixth and last single from the album was commercially successful in Croatia and the Balkan region, having reached the top of several radio station charts. The single was given the Grand Prix Award at the 2007 Split Music Awards. An accompanying music video was directed by Željko Petreš and released in 2007; along with the song's lyrics, the music video was filmed next to a church and in a casino where Rozga is seen around her love interest.

== Commercial performance ==
The album debuted at the top of the Croatian Albums Chart immediately after its release, in the 31st week of 2006. The following week it landed at position three and the week afterwards it fell to the fifth position. It received a gold certification by the Croatian Phonographic Industry.

The album and its success led to an increase in the singer's performances both in Croatia and in other Balkan countries. Several songs from the album, including "Gospe Moja", "Roba S Greškom" and "Vršnjaci Moji" achieved popularity and became part of the singer's set list on later concerts as well.

== Track listing ==
Oprosti Mala – Standard edition
No.	Title	Writer(s)	Producer(s)	Length
1.	"Oprosti Mala"	Tonči Huljić; Vjekoslava Huljić	Remi Kazinoti	3:44
2.	"Ja Znam Dobro Što Mi Je"	Huljić; Huljić	Kazinoti	3:20
3.	"Roza Boja"	Đorđe Novković; Željko Pavičić	Kazinoti	4:11
4.	"Vršnjaci Moji (Zlatokosa)"	Huljić; Huljić	Kazinoti	3:32
5.	"Sve Se Meni Čini"	Huljić; Huljić	Kazinoti	3:55
6.	"Roba S Greškom"	Huljić; Huljić	Kazinoti	3:56
7.	"Sve Mi Tvoje Oči Govore"	Novković; Pavičić	Kazinoti	3:12
8.	"Suze Od Kristala"	Huljić; Huljić	Kazinoti	4:37
9.	"Lijepa Samo Za Tebe"	Keith Thomas; Vjekoslava Huljić	Kazinoti	3:04
10.	"Ne Zovi Me Marija"	Huljić; Huljić	Kazinoti	3:03
11.	"Bilo Bi Super (Motiwwwo Gold Remix)"	Tonči Huljić; Marina Tucaković	Motiwwwo	5:23
12.	"Oprosti Mala (Drum'n'dance Remix)"	Huljić; Huljić	Motiwwwo	4:33
13.	"Ne Zovi Me Marija (Motiwwwo Radio Remix)"	Huljić; Huljić	Motiwwwo	4:17

Oprosti Mala – Re-edition (2007)
No.	Title	Writer(s)	Producer(s)	Length
1.	"Gospe Moja"	Tonči Huljić; Vjekoslava Huljić	Remi Kazinoti	3:25
2.	"Nemam (feat. Zlatko Pejaković)"	Huljić; Huljić	Kazinoti	3:00
3.	"Oprosti Mala"	Huljić; Huljić	Kazinoti	3:06
4.	"Ja Znam Dobro Što Mi Je"	Huljić; Huljić	Kazinoti	3:45
5.	"Roza Boja"	Đorđe Novković; Željko Pavičić	Kazinoti	3:22
6.	"Vršnjaci Moji (Zlatokosa)"	Huljić; Huljić	Kazinoti	3:14
7.	"Sve Se Meni Čini"	Huljić; Huljić	Kazinoti	4:13
8.	"Roba S Greškom"	Huljić; Huljić	Kazinoti	3:57
9.	"Sve Mi Tvoje Oči Govore"	Novković; Pavičić	Kazinoti	3:34
10.	"Suze Od Kristala"	Huljić; Huljić	Kazinoti	3:58
11.	"Lijepa Samo Za Tebe"	Keith Thomas; Vjekoslava Huljić	Kazinoti	4:39
12.	"Ne Zovi Me Marija"	Huljić; Huljić	Kazinoti	3:05
13.	"Bilo Bi Super (Motiwwwo Gold Remix)"	Tonči Huljić; Marina Tucaković	Motiwwwo	5:24
14.	"Oprosti Mala (Drum'n'dance Remix)"	Huljić; Huljić	Motiwwwo	4:34
15.	"Ne Zovi Me Marija (Motiwwwo Radio Remix)"	Huljić; Huljić	Motiwwwo	4:16
Total length:				57:32

Notes

- "Lijepa Samo Za Tebe" is a cover of "I Could Fall in Love" (1995) by Mexican-American singer Selena Quintanilla.
- "Bilo Bi Super" is originally recorded by Magazin for the album Da Mi Te Zaljubit' U Mene (1991) when Danijela Martinović served as the lead vocalist.

== Credits and personnel ==
Credits are taken from the album's liner notes and Discogs.

- Remi Kazinoti – arrangement
- Alenka Milano – backing vocals (tracks: 6 to 8)
- Brankica Brodarić – backing vocals (tracks: 3, 4)
- Vesna Ivić – backing vocals (tracks: 3 to 5, 7, 8)
- Tomislav Mrduljaš – engineering
- Zlatko Brodarić – guitar
- Vjekoslava Huljić – lyrics (tracks: 1, 2, 4 to 6, 8 to 10)
- Magazin – guest performer
- Tomica Marić – photography
- Motiwwwo – producer (tracks: 11 to 13)
- Remi Kazinoti – producer
- Tonči Huljić – supervision, music (tracks: 1, 2, 4 to 6, 8, 10)

== Charts ==
Chart performance for Oprosti Mala
Chart (2006)	Peak position
Croatian Albums Chart	1

== Release history ==
Oprosti Mala release history
Region	Date	Format	Label	Ref.
Croatia; Serbia	August 2006	digital download; CD	Croatia; Tonika	
Croatia; Serbia	1 September 2007	Re-release digital download	iTunes Store	
Croatia; Serbia	1 May 2013	Music streaming	YouTube	
