= Remi Kazinoti =

Remi Kazinoti Remi Casinotti
- Born: 5 July 1959; Split, PR Croatia, FPR Yugoslavia
- Died: 6 August 2017 (aged 58) Split, Croatia
- Occupations: Songwriter; arranger; record producer
- Instrument: Keyboards
- Years active: 1976–2017

Remi Kazinoti (Italian: Casinotti; 5 July 1959 – 6 August 2017) was a Croatian musician, songwriter, arranger and record producer. He also played keyboards. In the span of his career, he wrote songs for many Croatian artists, including Danijela Martinović, Petar Grašo, Magazin, Gibonni, Giuliano, Doris Dragović, Matko Jelavić, Dražen Zečić, Ivo Amulić, Meri Cetinić, Mladen Grdović and Jelena Rozga. He died on 6 August 2017 to lung cancer.

== Early years ==
Remi Kazinoti was born in Split, Croatia to father Mile Kazinoti who served as a saxophonist in the band Aspalathos Brassa. He finished at the music school Josip Hatza and in 1977 he finished at the gymnasium Ćiro Gamulin in the theoretical division. During high school, he already started playing keyboards and in 1976 he recorded his first single, titled "Velike Su Tajne / Ti Bi Sretna Bila". Following that, he arranged the music to the song "Samo simpatija" with which he performed at the FZG Split together with the group More. He then went on to finish university at the Faculty of Philosophy - teacher division in Split, which he finished in 1985 and gained the title Professor of Music Culture. From 1978 to 1980, he was a member of Oliver Dragojević's band and worked as a professor of music. After leaving the group, he joined Meri Cetinić's band and in 1984 he joined the band Aspalathos Brass.

He received the award of Achievement in 2016 for his contribution to Croatian music by the Croatian Phonographic Association. In the span of his career, Kazinoti has collaborated with numerous musicians, most notably Danijela Martinović, Petar Grašo, Magazin, Gibonni, Giuliano, Doris Dragović, Matko Jelavić, Dražen Zečić, Ivo Amulić, Meri Cetinić, Mladen Grdović, Jelena Rozga and klapas Intrade, Maslina, Cambi, Rišpet and Šufit among others.

== Private life ==
Kazinoti died on 6 August 2017, from lung cancer. He was buried at the Lovrinac Graveyard which was attended by Severina, Gibonni and Oliver among others.
