= FLY FM 89,7 =

Radio station based in Greece

FLY FM 89.7 is a radio station based in Laconia, Greece. It launched in October 1991 with the motto It happens now - u hear it on FLY FM 89.7! FLY FM plays Greek and international pop music and conducts interviews with Greek artists such as Katy Garbi and Giorgos Tsalikis, as well as providing a news service.

In 1998 the station started collaborations with radio stations and TV networks around Europe to broadcast the Eurovision Song Contest. The station is due to commence broadcasting via the internet. From October 2002 rebroadcasts with Skai 100.3.
