= Dražen Zečić =

Croatian singer-songwriter (born 1967)

- Born: 24 July 1967 (age 59); Split, SR Croatia, SFR Yugoslavia
- Occupation: Singer
- Years active: 1990–present

Dražen Zečić (born 24 July 1967) is a Croatian singer-songwriter. He was born in Split in 1967.

He initially began his career as a songwriter, writing for musicians such as Mate Bulić, Zlatko Pejaković, and Mišo Kovač. In 1990, he released his first album, and continues to be a popular artist today, especially in his native Dalmatia.

== Albums ==
- Zagrli me noćas jače – 1990 (Suzy)
- Evo zore, evo dana – 1992 (Croatia Records)
- Govore mi mnogi ljudi – 1993 (Orfej)
- Boem u duši – 1995 (Croatia Records)
- Tamo gdje je srce – 1996 (Croatia Records)
- Dražen Zečić – live – (Scardona)
- Nitko nema dva života – 1998 (Croatia Records)
- Još se sjećam jedne žene – 1999 (Vjeverica/Croatia Records)
- Žnjan – u živo – 2000 (Scardona)
- Ti si život moj – 2001 (Croatia Records)
- U ime ljubavi – 2002 (Scardona)
- Pokidat ću lance sve – 2004 (Hit Records)
- Zora – 2006 (Hit Records)
- Oprosti svijete – 2007 (Croatia Records)
- U čast svim dobrim ljudima – 2009 (Croatia Records)
- Crni kralj i bijela dama – 2011 (Croatia Records)
- Tvoj ću ostati – 2013 (Croatia Records)
