= Doris Dragović =

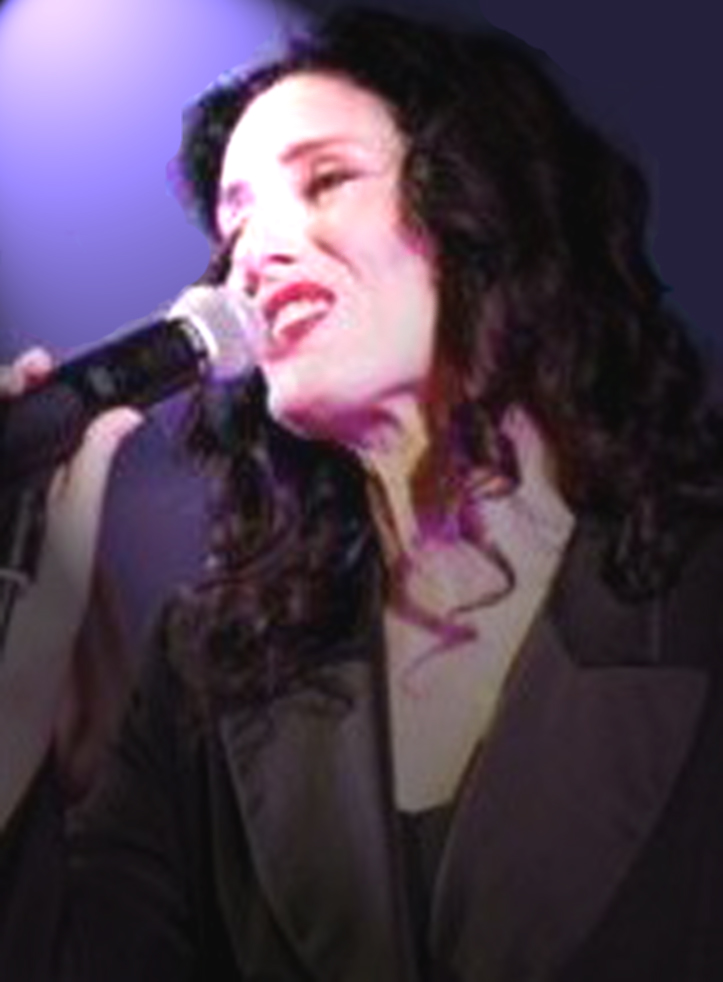
- Dragović in 2008
- Born: Dorotea Dragović; 16 April 1961 (age 65); Split, PR Croatia, FPR Yugoslavia
- Other names: Doris; Dorotea Budimir
- Occupations: Singer; songwriter
- Years active: 1982–present
- Spouse: Mario Budimir (m. 1990)
- Children: 1
- Musical career
- Genres: Pop; pop rock
- Instrument: Vocals
- Labels: Croatia Records; Tonika; HRT Orfej
- Formerly of: More

Dorotea Budimir (née Dragović; born 16 April 1961), better known as Doris Dragović (pronounced [dôːris drâːɡovitɕ]) or simply Doris, is a Croatian singer who has represented Yugoslavia in the Eurovision Song Contest 1986 with the song "Željo moja", finishing 11th with 49 points, and Croatia in the Eurovision Song Contest 1999 with the song "Marija Magdalena", finishing fourth with 118 points.

== Career ==
Dorotea Dragović was born in Split, Croatia, then part of Yugoslavia. Already in childhood, she was given the nickname Doris by her parents, mother Alice (née Radosavljević) and father Jakov "Braco" Dragović. Doris' maternal uncle Edi Radosavljević was one of the founders of the Split Festival. Doris had an interest in singing since her childhood. She cites Arsen Dedić, Gabi Novak and Tereza Kesovija as her biggest influences and childhood idols.

She came to national prominence in the early 1980s as a member of the More, and began her solo career in 1985. The same year, she represented Yugoslavia in the Eurovision Song Contest 1986 in Bergen with the song "Željo moja", and finished 11th with 49 points. Doris has since been one of the most famous pop singers in Yugoslavia and post-Yugoslav states.

In 1999, Doris was chosen to represent Croatia in the Eurovision Song Contest 1999, after she won the national election Dora with her song "Marija Magdalena", written by prominent Croatian songwritering couple Tonči Huljić and Vjekoslava Huljić. She placed fourth in Jerusalem. Her performance also included the removal of some of her clothing, and was well received in the first contest in which most countries allocated their points by televote. Equalling Maja Blagdan's 1996 placement, but surpassing it in total points, this became Croatia's best result at the contest, a record that stood until 2024. "Marija Magdalena" was also a radio hit on Greek radio station FLY FM 89.7 and reached number one on its airplay.

On 14th March 2026, Croatian singer Petar Grašo and Dragović held a concert in Boris Trajkovski Arena in Skopje, North Macedonia.

== Personal life ==
Dragović was known in the early 1980s for her work with bands from Split. She is a known supporter of Torcida Split, ultras of the football club Hajduk Split. In 2001, Dragović received threats from Torcida after she sang to Montenegrin president Milo Đukanović at the 2000 New Year's Eve party.

Since 1990, Dragović is married to a former water polo player, Mario Budimir, with whom she has a son named Borna (born 1990). Mario Budimir is a maternal uncle of Iris Rajčić, the wife of Hajduk Split legend Marko Livaja.

== Discography ==
=== Albums ===
Studio albums

- Hajde da se mazimo (as part of More; 1983)
- Tigrica (with More; 1985)
- Željo moja (1986)
- Tužna je noć (1987)
- Tvoja u duši (1987)
- Pjevaj srce moje (1988)
- Budi se dan (1989)
- Dajem ti srce (1992)
- Ispuni mi zadnju želju (1993)
- Baklje ivanjske (1995)
- Živim po svom (1997)
- Krajem vijeka (1999)
- Lice (2000)
- Malo mi za sriću triba (2002)
- Ja vjerujem (2009)
- Doris (2025)

Live albums

- Rođendan u Zagrebu (1996)
- Koncert u Lisinskom (2014)
- Live Spaladium Arena (2016)

Compilation albums

- Najveći hitovi (1990)
- Sve želje moje (1998)
- 20 godina s ljubavlju (2001)
- The Platinum Collection (2007)
- Najljepše ljubavne pjesme (2010)
- The Best Of Collection (2014)
- Original Album Collection (2019)
- 25 Greatest Hits (2025)

=== Singles ===
Title	Year	Peak chart positions	Album
Title	Year	CRO Dom. Air.	Album
"Ima nešto u tome" (with Jacques Houdek)	2016	7	Mjuzikl Pacijenti
"Jedina jubav moga života" (with Klapa Rišpet)	2018	8	Šta mi ljube oćeš kazat
"Brod za nabolje"	2019	4	Non-album singles
"Sna' ću se ja"	2021	4	Non-album singles
"Tajna" (with Osmi Putnik)	2021	6	Non-album singles
"Dva smo života" (Grupa Viva featuring Doris Dragović)	2022	13	Non-album singles
"Sve smo mogli imat"	2022	5	Non-album singles
"Marija Magdalena" (Tonči Huljić featuring Doris Dragović)	2023	—	Non-album singles
"Koplje ljubavi"	2024	7	Non-album singles
"Sluge tuge"	2025	3	Non-album singles
"Kad zastor mi padne" (with More)	2025	24	Non-album singles

== See also ==
- Croatia in the Eurovision Song Contest
- Yugoslavia in the Eurovision Song Contest
- Zadarfest

Preceded by Ida & Vlado with "Ciao, amore"	Yugoslavia in the Eurovision Song Contest; 1986	Succeeded by Novi Fosili with "Ja sam za ples"
Preceded by Danijela with "Neka mi ne svane"	Croatia in the Eurovision Song Contest; 1999	Succeeded by Goran Karan with "Kad zaspu anđeli"
