= Spaladium Arena =

Indoor arena in Split, Croatia

- Spaladium Arena exterior
- Interactive map of Spaladium Arena
- Address: Zrinsko-frankopanska ulica 211
- Location: Lovret, Split, Croatia
- Coordinates: 43°31′28″N 16°26′09″E
- Owner: Sportski Grad TPN d.o.o. (2008–2022); City of Split (2022–present)
- Operator: Global Spectrum Europe
- Capacity: 12,339 (Boxing); 10,941 (Basketball, handball, futsal, tennis); 19,000 (Concerts)

Construction
- Opened: 28 December 2008; 17 years ago
- Cost: €70 million
- Architect: 3LHD

Tenants
- Croatia men's national basketball team (selected matches); Croatia men's national handball team (selected matches): Major events hosted; 2009 World Men's Handball Championship; 2018 European Men's Handball Championship

Website
- spaladiumarena.hr

The Spaladium Arena is a multi-purpose indoor arena located in Split, Croatia. It was opened in December 2008, and hosted the following month's World Men's Handball Championship 2009, and the 2018 European Men's Handball Championship, respectively.

As of August 2013, Spaladium Arena had been closed for more than a year over the inability of its operators to cover the maintenance costs. It was reopened for a Severina concert in December 2013. As of 2020, the arena was largely out of use. In 2022, it was announced that the arena will be sold due to maintenance costs. The formal reason for the closure of the Arena is the blocking of the Sportski grad TPN d.o.o. company's account by the City of Split in June 2022, in the amount of tens of millions of kunas due to unpaid utility fees and other charges. As of 2024, the arena is closed and still waiting for a potential buyer.

== History ==
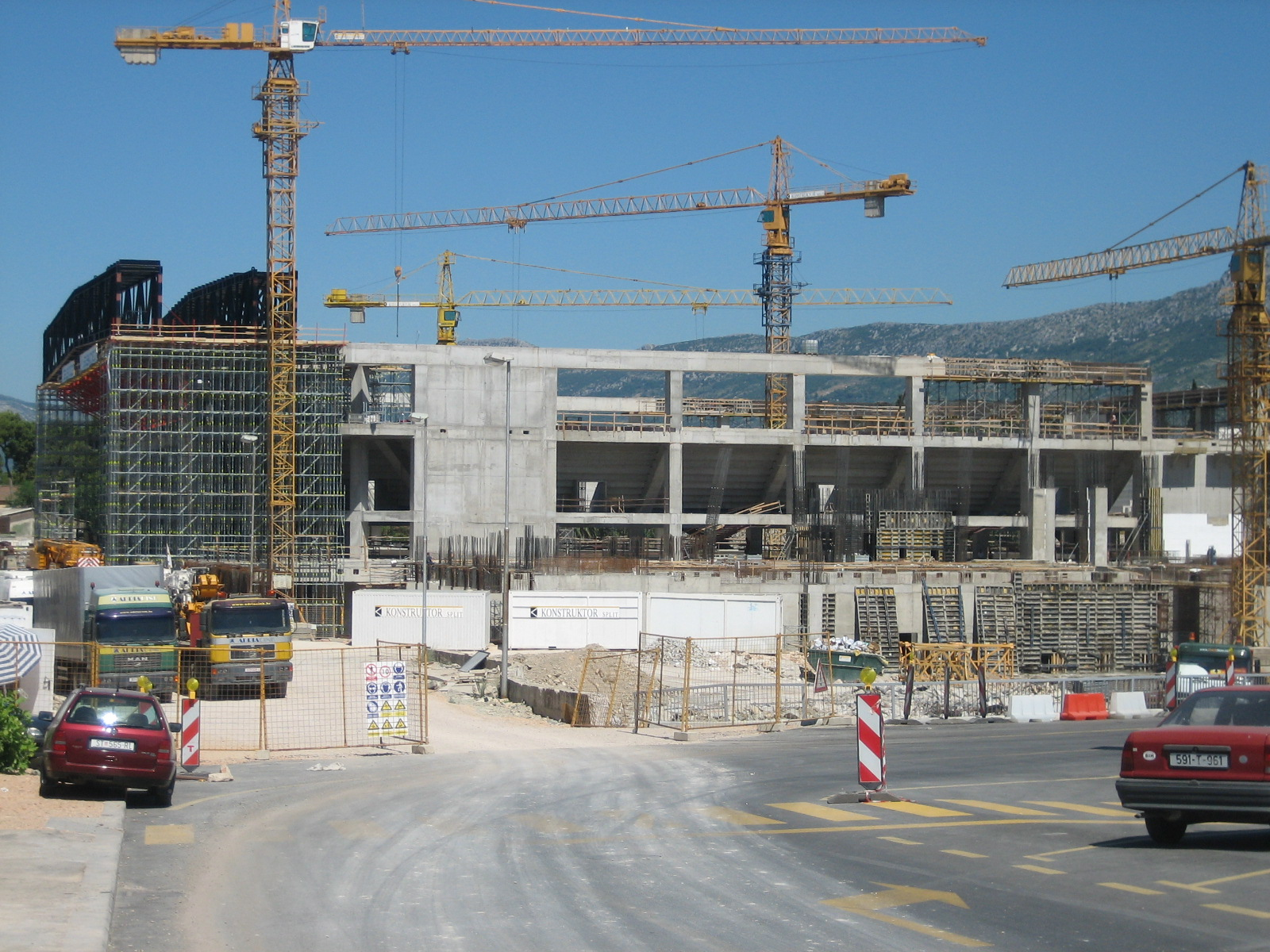
Construction of the Arena, 2008

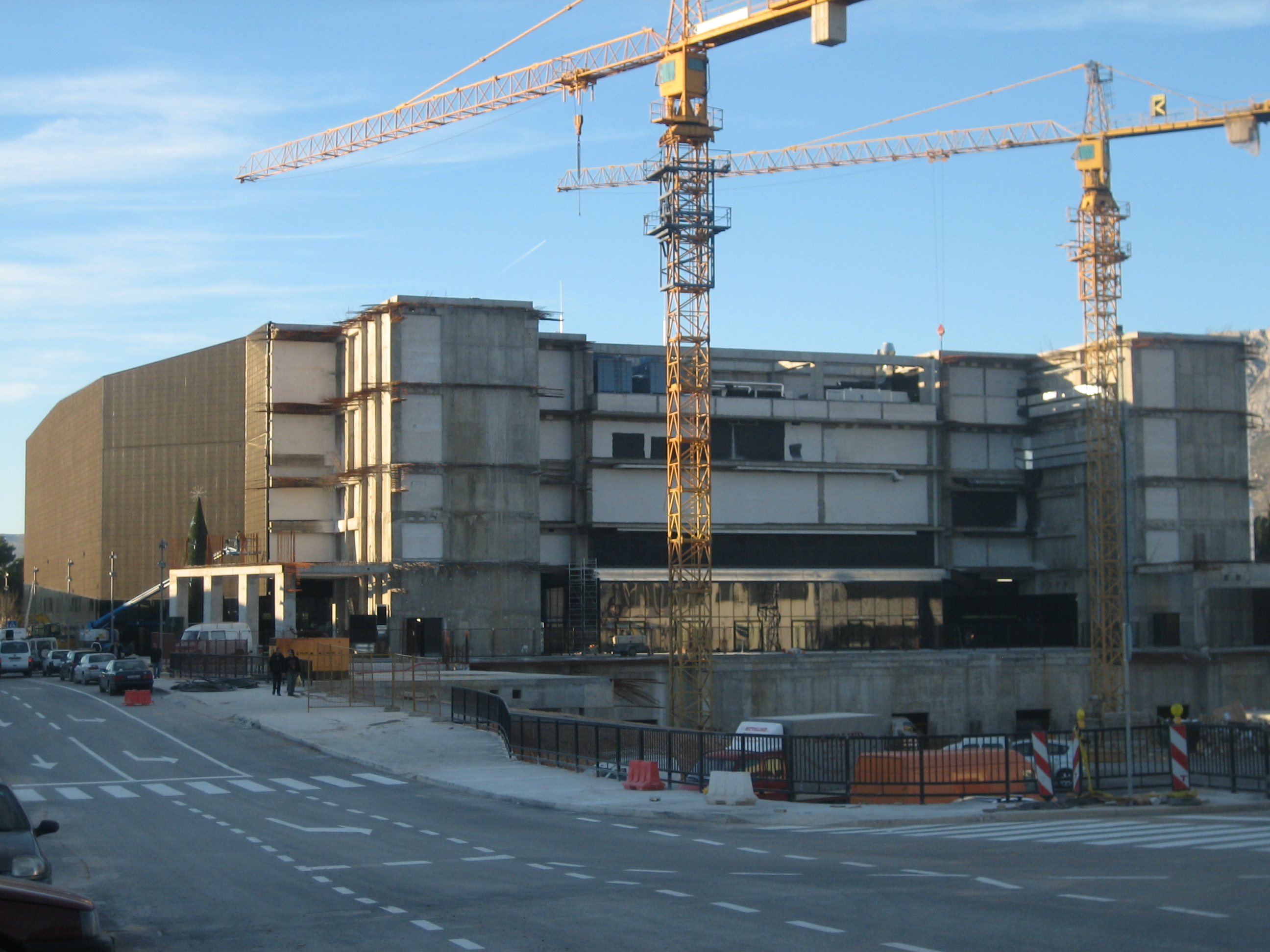
East side of construction, 2008

Spaladium Arena was opened in December 2008, for the purpose of Croatia's hosting of the World Men's Handball Championship in 2009 together with Arena Zagreb in Zagreb and Gradski vrt in Osijek. They were built in record time using the public-private partnership model. The cost of their construction was €137 million, and over three decades, Croatian taxpayers will pay investors 360 million euros. For the opening ceremony, Spaladium Arena hosted a concert where Oliver Dragojević and Tony Cetinski sang.

The construction of the Spaladium Arena, without the office tower that has yet to be built, costed around 50 million euros. The price of the entire complex is estimated at 147 million euros. The investor was a Croatian consortium (Konstruktor, IGH, Dalekovod) gathered under the name "Sportski grad TPN". The lease of five million euros, including VAT, will be shared annually by the state and the city, and over thirty years, 150 million euros should be paid to investors. After 30 years, the "Sportski Grad TPN" will hand over the hall and other built commercial spaces to Split. Split will use the hall 52 days a year, and for the next 10 years it will be managed by the American company Global Spectrum.

The first concert was Simple Minds on November 14, 2009, followed by Ministry of Sound on New Years’s Party on December 1, 2009, and then Zdravko Čolić on February 14, 2010.

=== 2012 financial issues ===
In 2012, Spaladium Arena was dealing with financial issues, starting with maintenance costs. The Spaladium Arena received electricity from City of Split who stepped in with a loan and the debt to HEP of 125 thousand kuna was settled. The connected appliances have restored optimism to the people of the Sportski grad TPN, which manages the Arena on behalf of the consortium. The return of electricity is very significant because it allowed the performances of the bands Guns & Roses and The Cult which took place in July 2012, which had already been called into question. The management of the Spaladium Arena was forced to postpone several dates due to the power outage, including the Hari Mata Hari concert, which was supposed to take place in two days.

However, despite the return of electricity, the problems are far from being solved, and that is the blockade of the Sportski Grad TPN by the creditor of the Arena construction project, Erste Bank from Vienna. Since the City of Split stopped paying the monthly installment of three million kuna in November 2011, the debt to the Sports City has grown to a very respectable 13.6 million kuna. If that had been paid, the debt of HEP of 125 thousand kuna would have been a trifle barely worth mentioning. This is how the City of Split paid for what it did not have to, and not what it should have. Prime Minister Zoran Milanović did not responded to the letter from Split Mayor Željko Kerum, who requested an urgent meeting due to the problems with the Arena. There have been some discussions with certain members of the Government, but a meeting at the highest level has not been organized.

=== Closing ===
Due to the debt of the City of Split, which has risen to as much as 21.6 million kuna, Spaladium Arena was closed.

The leaders of the Spaladium Arena have sent a letter to Mayor Željko Kerum and his deputy Juro Šundov in which they are asking the city administration to urgently pay them at least part of the debt incurred due to non-payment of the monthly rent of the hall, which, let us recall, is the City's obligation under the signed contract on a public-private partnership with a consortium of three companies: "Konstruktor inženjering", "Dalekovod" and the Croatian Institute of Civil Engineering. They need this money, according to Lora, in order to avoid bankruptcy of the company that manages the hall.

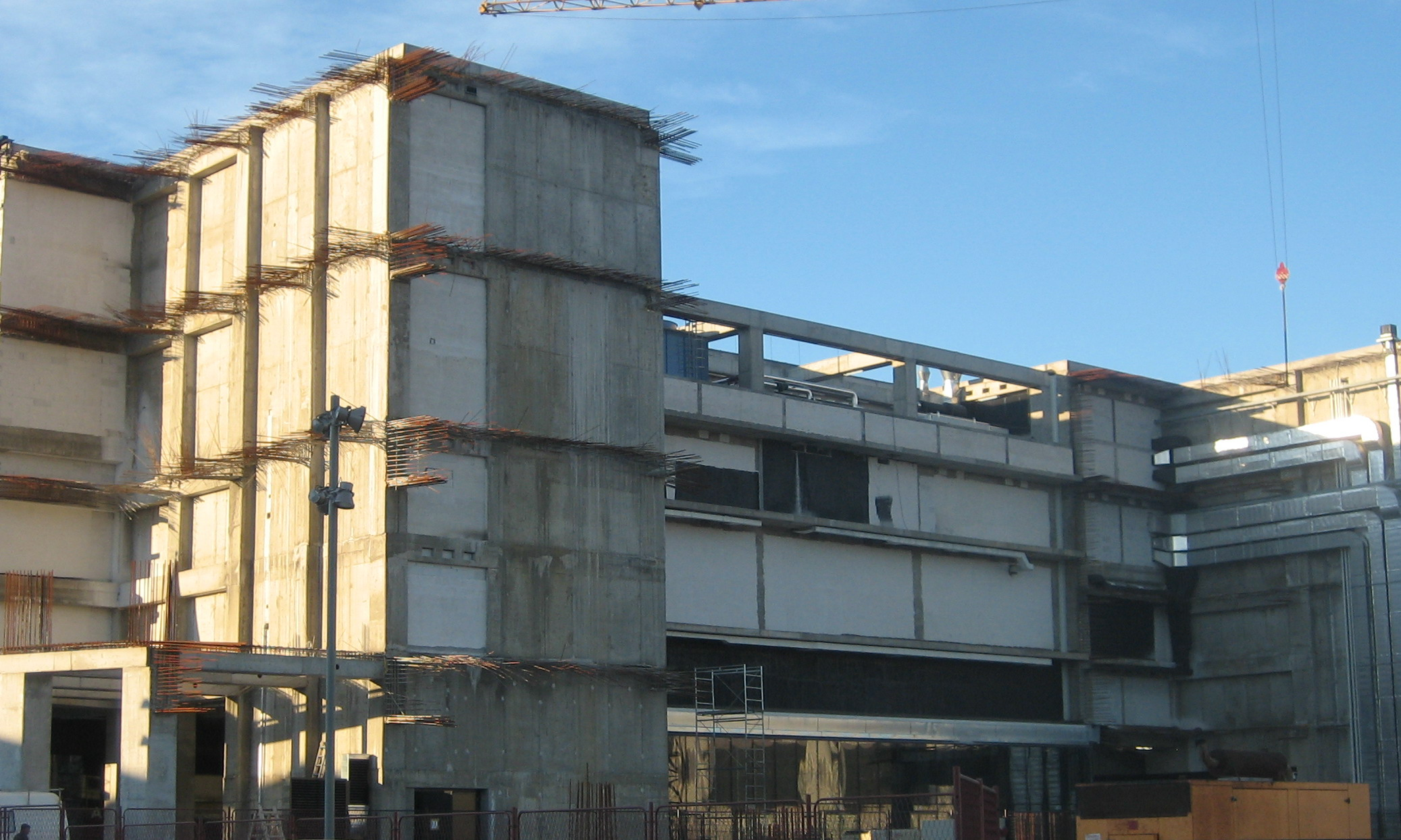
Unfinished west side of Spaladium Arena

The letter, which we have in our possession, also states that Spaladium Arena has been in a blockade since July 23 of 2012 due to non-payment of rent by the City, which was initiated by the Tax Administration due to a debt of 2.6 million kunas, which arose after the “Sportski grad TPN” sent invoices to the city administration for payment of the aforementioned rent. The Arena also informed the Banovina that the debt to suppliers who maintain the technical integrity of the huge hall has risen to almost 500 thousand kuna. Debts are also piling up towards “Elektrodalmacija”, security guards, cleaners, “Vodovod”. All of this led, according to the end of the letter signed by Ivan Ljubičić, Arena director, to the cancellation of concerts by Mišo Kovač, the British band Pink Floyd, the group Lord of the Dance, Đorđe Balašević, as well as the Split basketball match and Ante Bilić’s boxing match for the European title. At the end of the letter, the director of the company "Sportski grad TPN" tells Mayor Kerum and his deputy Šundov that he will "close the Arena at the beginning of September due to a technical malfunction" if the debts are not paid soon.

== Concerts and events ==
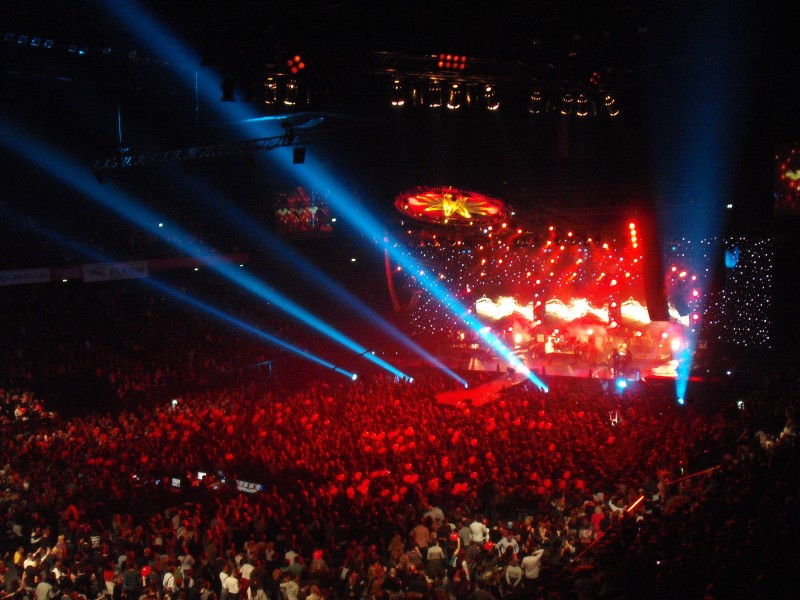
Zdravko Čolić concert, 2010

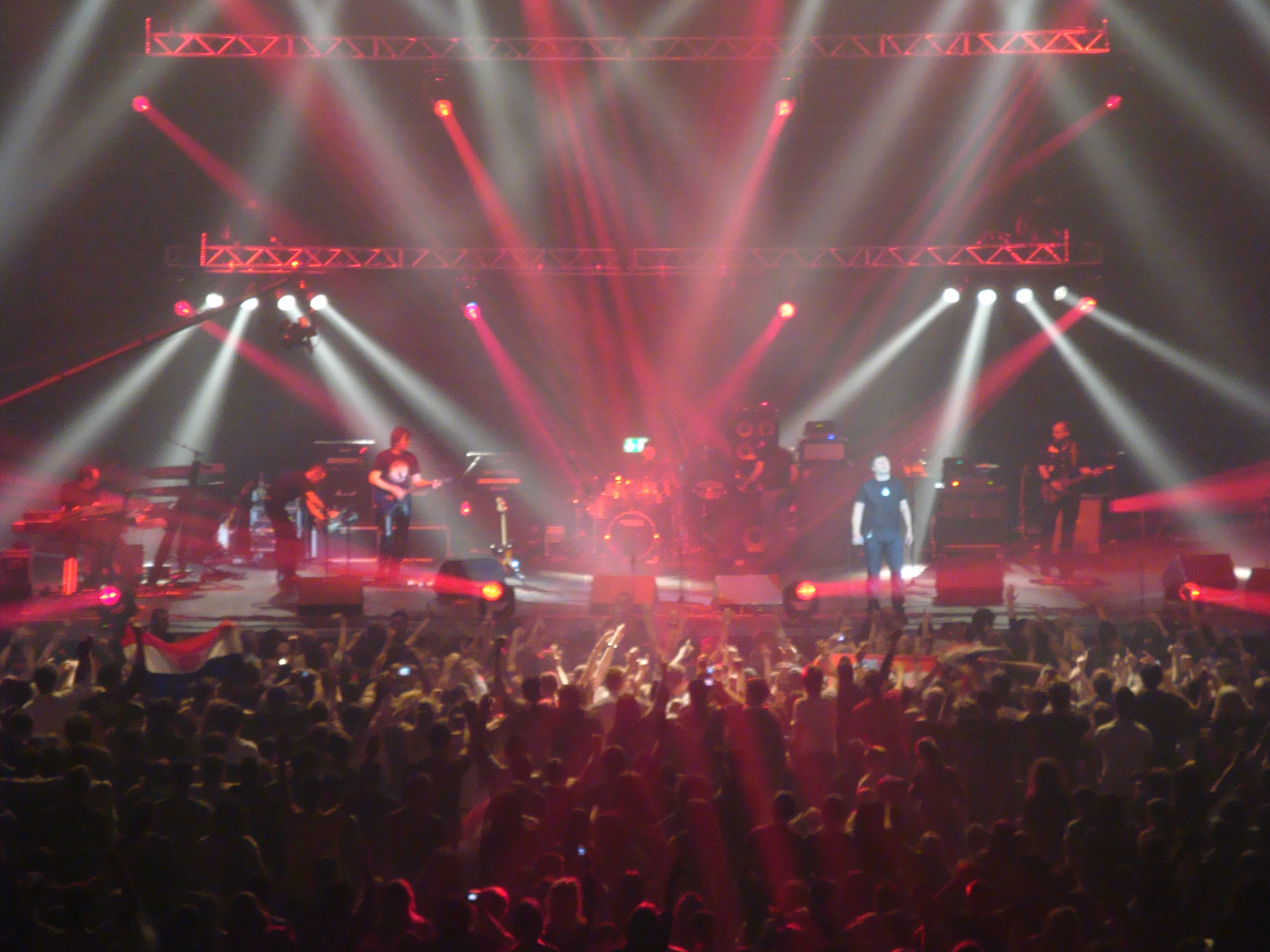
Marko Perković Thompson concert, 2014

Date	Artist/Performer/Musician	Event/Tour	Link
10 May 2009	Bijelo Dugme	Concert	
31 December 2009 – 1 January 2010	Ministry of Sound	New Year's Party	
14 February 2010	Zdravko Čolić	Concert	
7 October 2010	Zlatan Stipišić Gibonni	Concert	
24 October 2010	Oliver Dragojević	Concert	
10 December 2010	Đorđe Balašević	Concert	
11 February 2011	Jelena Rozga	The Bižuterija Tour	
18 March 2011	Bajaga i Instruktori	Concert	
14 October 2011	Hladno Pivo	Concert	
19 November 2011	TBF	Concert	
17 July 2012	Guns N' Roses	Concert	
6 December 2013	Severina Vučković	Dobrodošao u Klub Tour	
1 March 2014	Dubioza kolektiv	Concert	
8 March 2014	Željko Joksimović	Concert	
23 December 2014	Marko Perković Thompson	Concert	
22 May 2015	Đorđe Balašević	Concert	
16 October 2015	Zdravko Čolić	Concert	
4 December 2015	Bijelo Dugme	Concert	
11 December 2015	Doris Dragović	Concert	
13 February 2016	Petar Grašo	Concert	
15 April 2016	Boban Rajović	Concert	
27 July 2016	Iron Maiden	The Book of Souls World Tour	
7 October 2016	Oliver Dragojević and Gibonni	Concert	
19 November 2016	Parni Valjak	Concert	
10 February 2017	Prljavo Kazalište	Concert	—
16 November 2018	Plavi Orkestar	Concert	
8 March 2019	Nina Badrić	Concert	—
31 March 2019	Maya Berović	Pravo Vreme Tour	
2 November 2019	Parni Valjak	Concert	
16 November 2019	Severina Vučković	The Magic Tour	—
21 December 2019	Željko Bebek	Concert	—
25 March 2022	Petar Grašo	Concert	—
12 November 2022	Doris Dragović	Concert	—
17 December 2022	Saša Matić	Concert	
29 December 2022	Saša Matić	Concert	

== Gallery ==
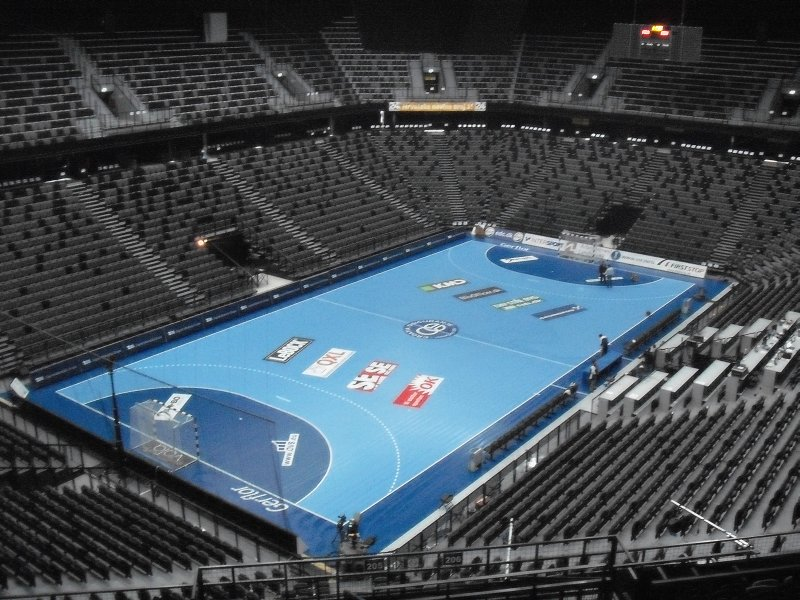
The empty arena

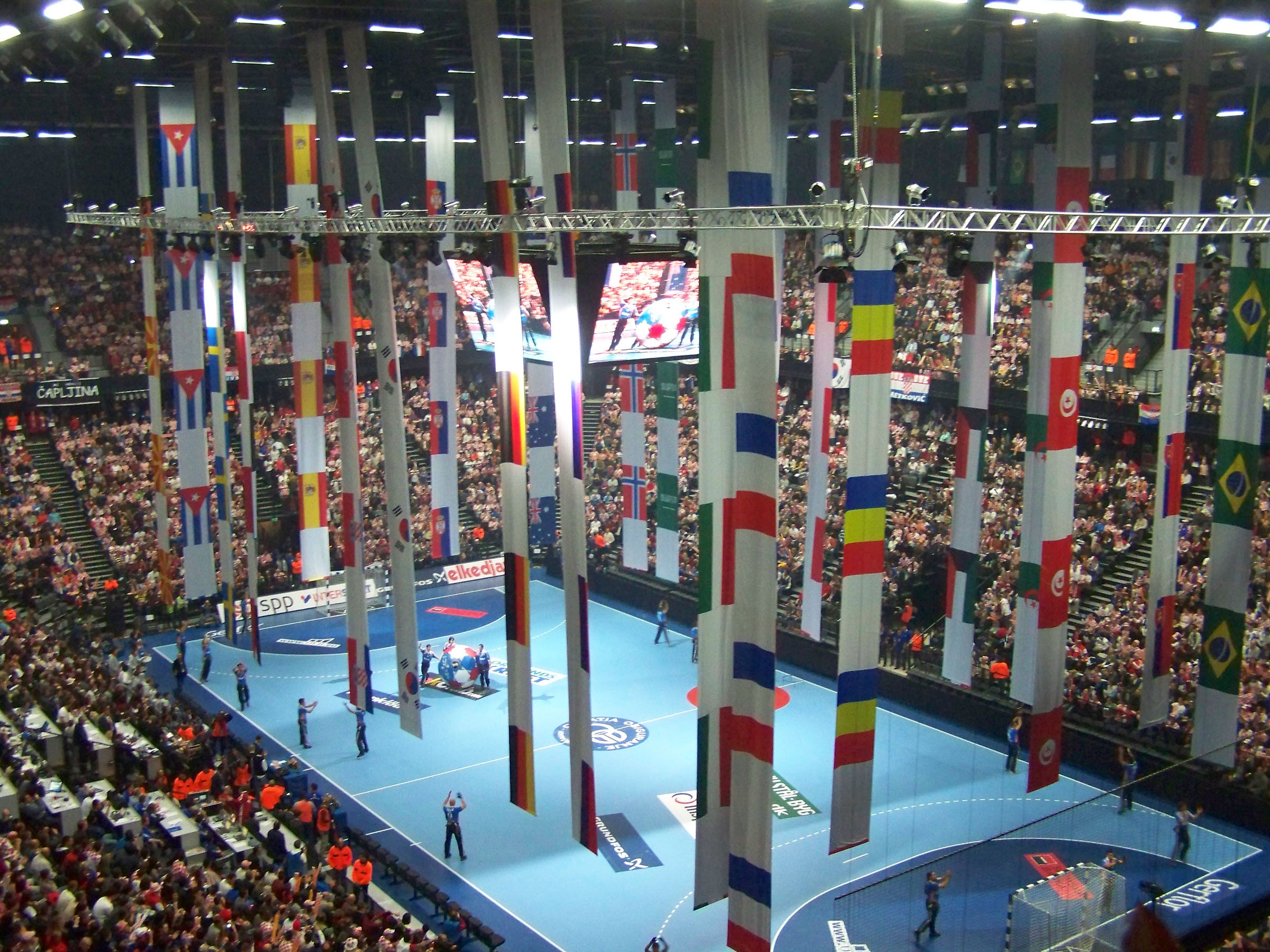
2009 World Men's Handball Championship opening ceremony

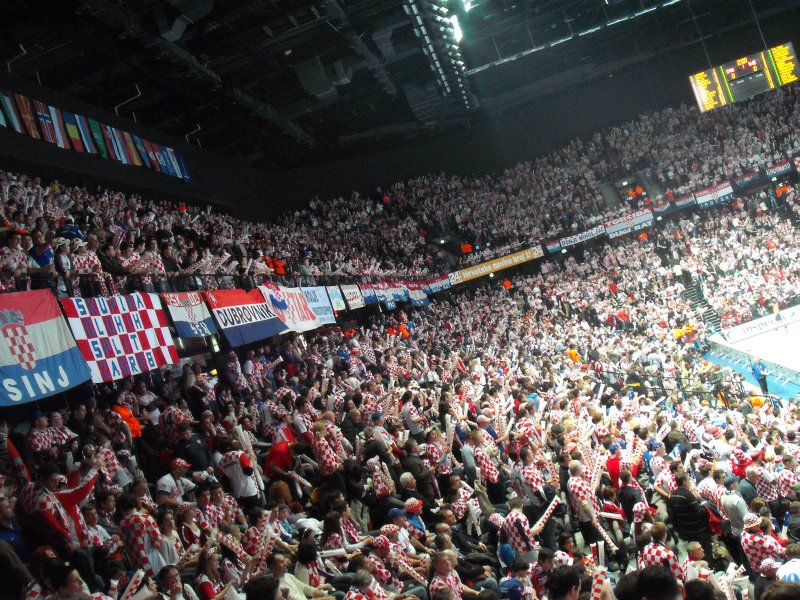
Fans in the stands

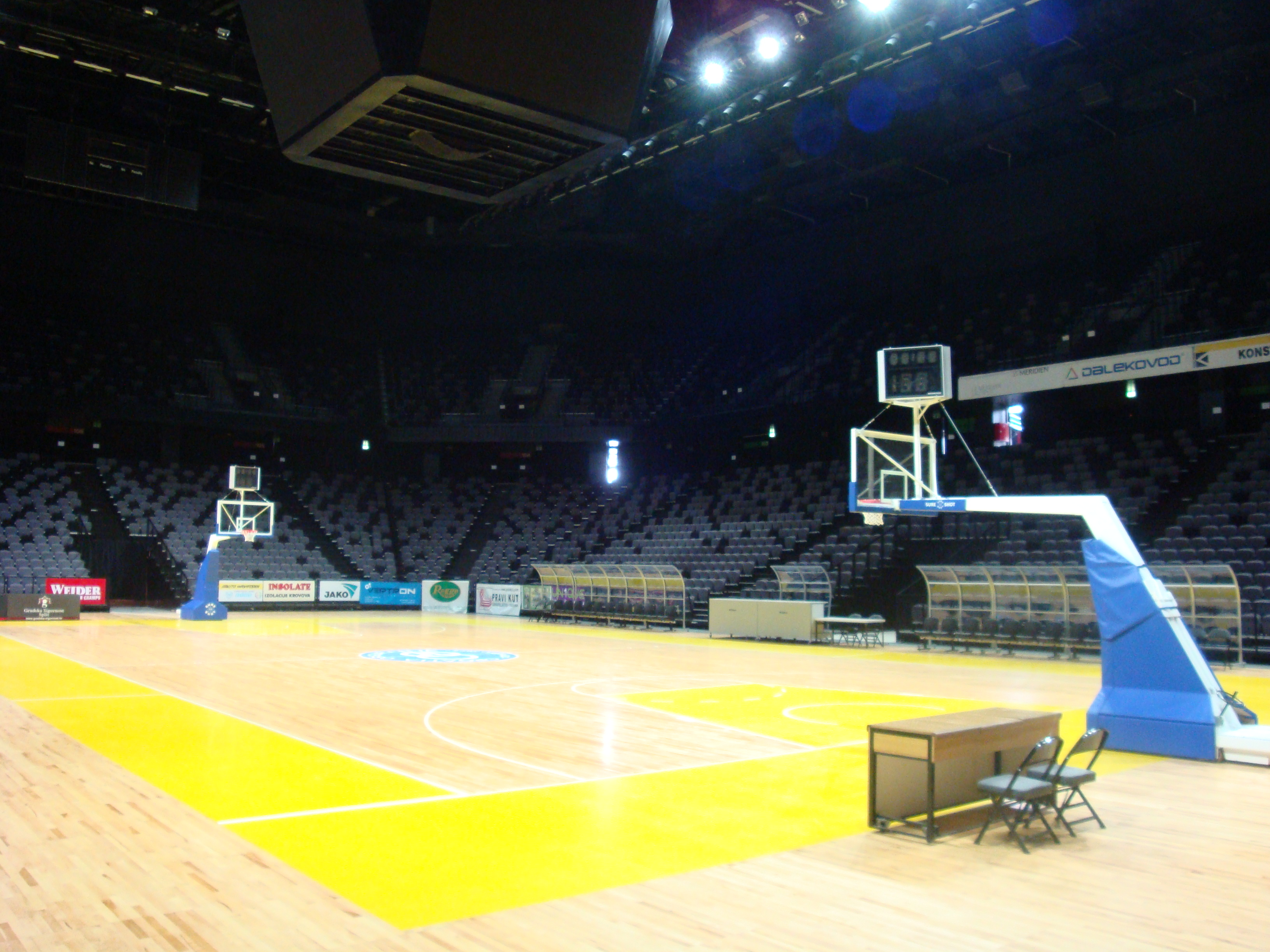
Interior

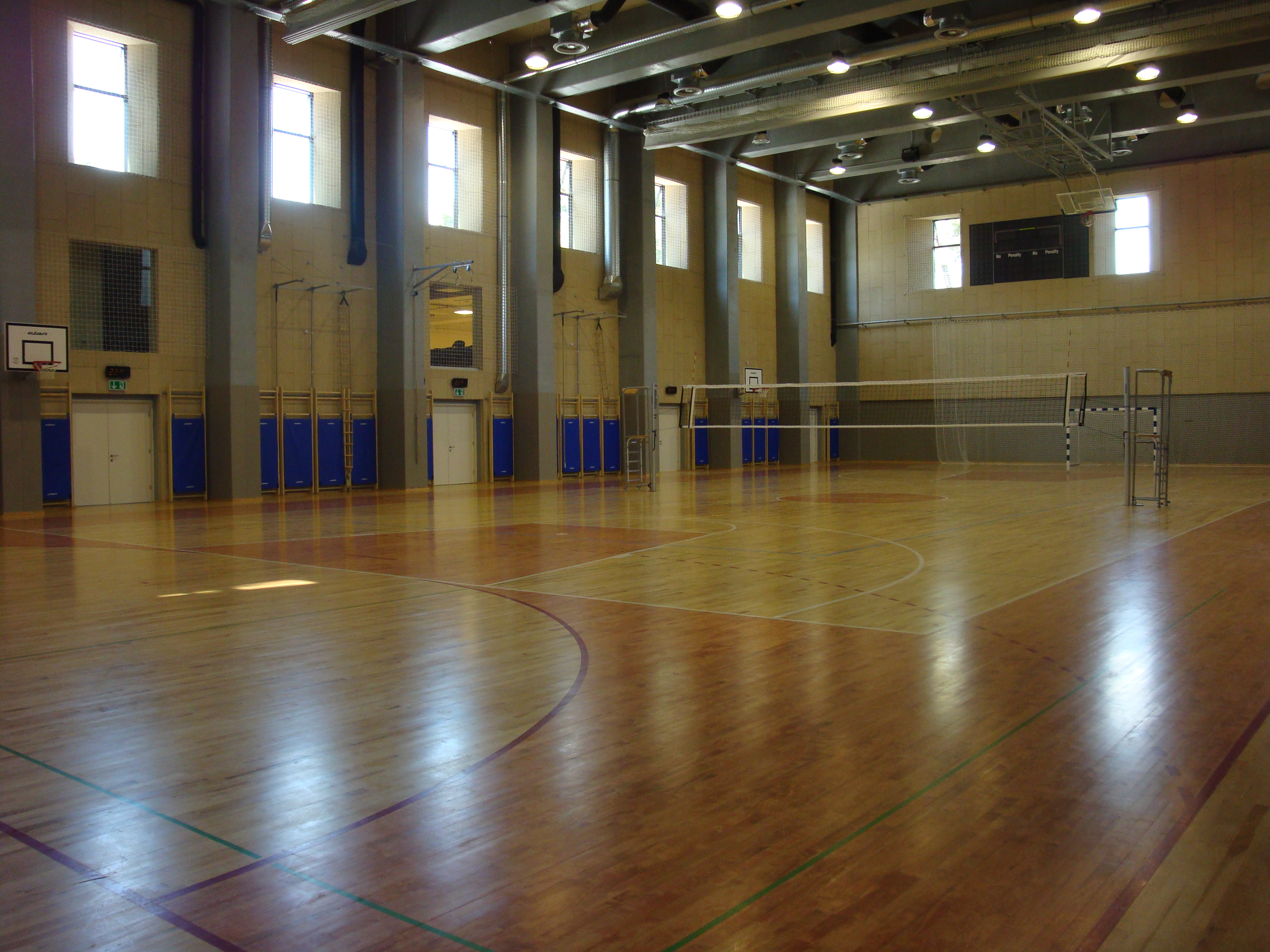
Sports hall

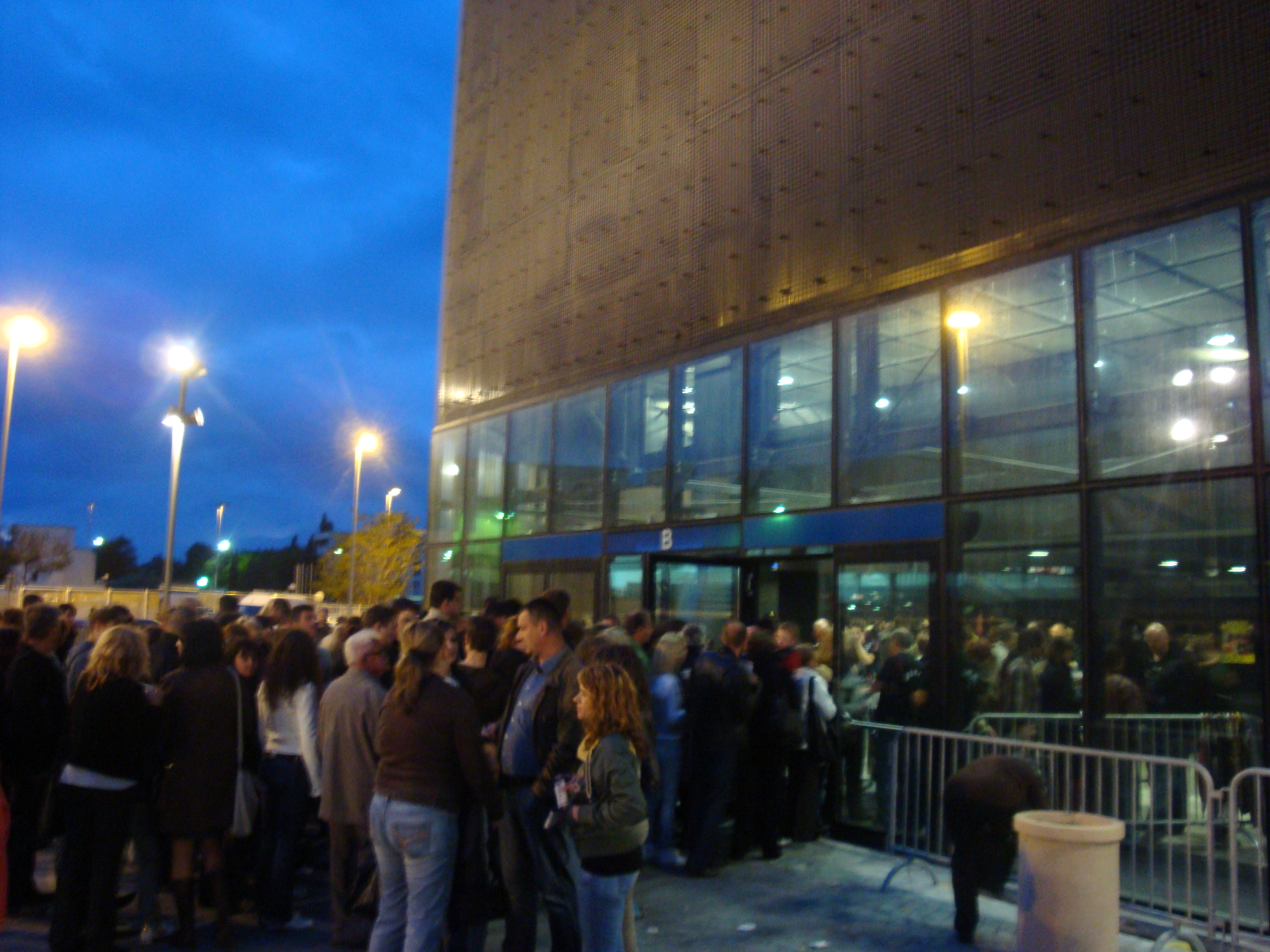
Exterior

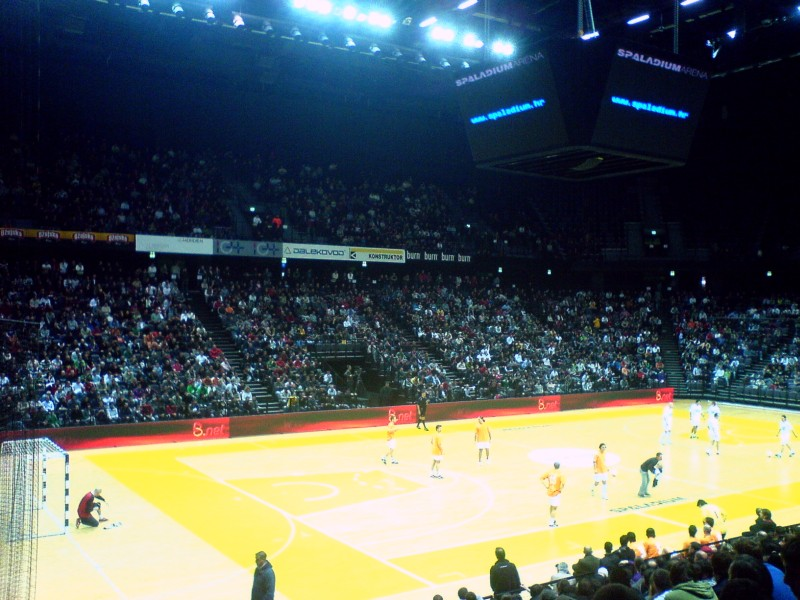
Futsal tournament

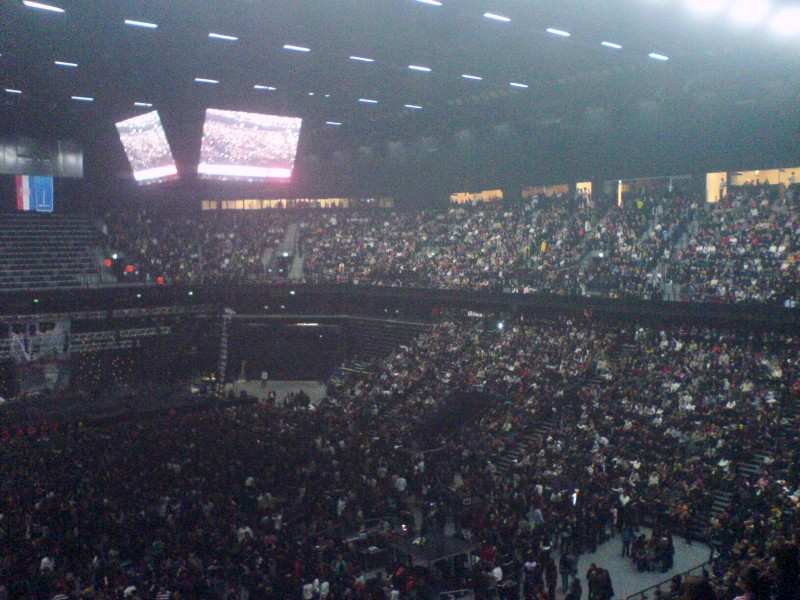
Haiti benefit concert, record attendance

== See also ==
- List of indoor arenas in Croatia
- List of indoor arenas in Europe
