= Meri Cetinić =

Croatian pop singer

- Born: 15 June 1953 (age 73); Split, PR Croatia, FPR Yugoslavia
- Occupation: Singer
- Years active: 1973–present

Meri Cetinić (born 15 June 1953) is a Croatian pop singer and soprano vocalist.

Cetinić was born in Split and graduated at the Teachers Academy of the University of Split. Her first major contribution was the song "More" (lit. "the Sea") with the band Grupa More in 1973.

Between the 1970s and the 1990s, she released 12 albums under major Yugoslav and Croatian record labels, some of which went gold and platinum.
