= Arena Zagreb =

Indoor arena in Zagreb, Croatia

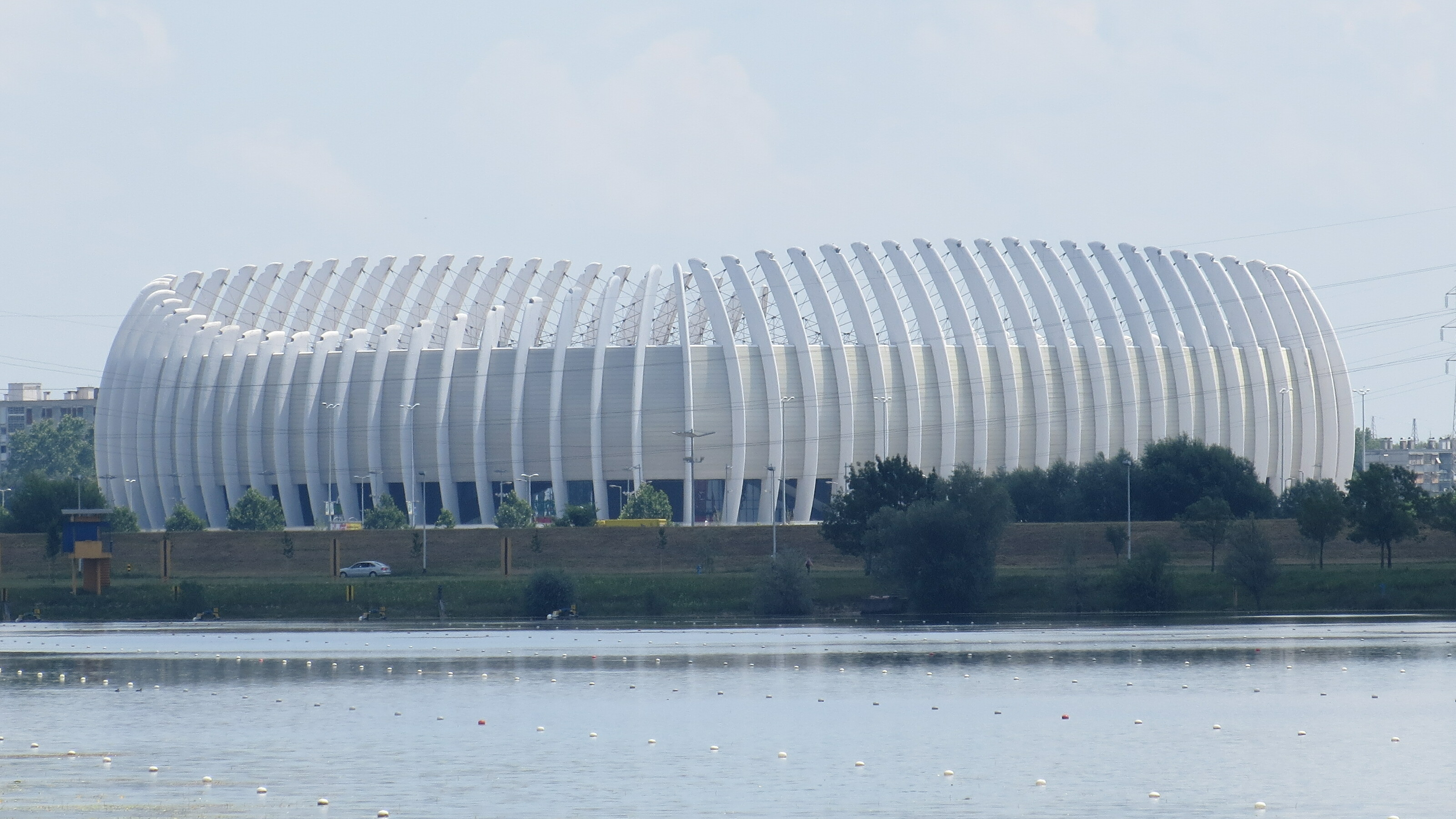
- Arena Zagreb seen from across Jarun Lake
- Interactive map of Arena Zagreb
- Address: Ulica Vice Vukova 8
- Location: Novi Zagreb, Zagreb, Croatia
- Coordinates: 45°46.30′N 15°56.57′E
- Owner: City of Zagreb
- Operator: Arena Zagreb Ltd. (part of Zagreb Holding)
- Capacity: 16,500 (Basketball); 15,200 (Boxing, handball, ice hockey); 23,000 (Concerts)
- Field size: 29.540 m2

Construction
- Groundbreaking: 20 July 2007
- Built: 2007–2008
- Opened: 27 December 2008
- Cost: €89 million
- Architects: UPI-2M ltd. Decathlon
- Structural engineer: UPI-2M ltd.
- Main contractors: TriGránit; Ingra

Tenants
- RK Zagreb (2009–present); KHL Medveščak (2011–2013); Croatia men's national handball team (2008–present)

Website
- www.zagrebarena.hr

The Arena Zagreb is a multi-purpose indoor arena located in Zagreb, Croatia. The site also includes a building complex, the Arena Complex (Arena Center), making it one of the largest shopping-entertainment centers in the city. The arena is used for hockey, futsal, handball, athletics, basketball, volleyball, numerous other sporting competitions, and various concerts, exhibitions, fairs, conventions, and congresses. Arena Zagreb is a former member of the European Arenas Association (EAA), and it is the biggest indoor and sports arena in Croatia and one of the biggest indoor arenas in Europe.

The shopping center and Arena Zagreb share a series of services such as a joint parking lot, multiplex cinema, wellness center, numerous restaurants, cafes, and stores.

== History ==
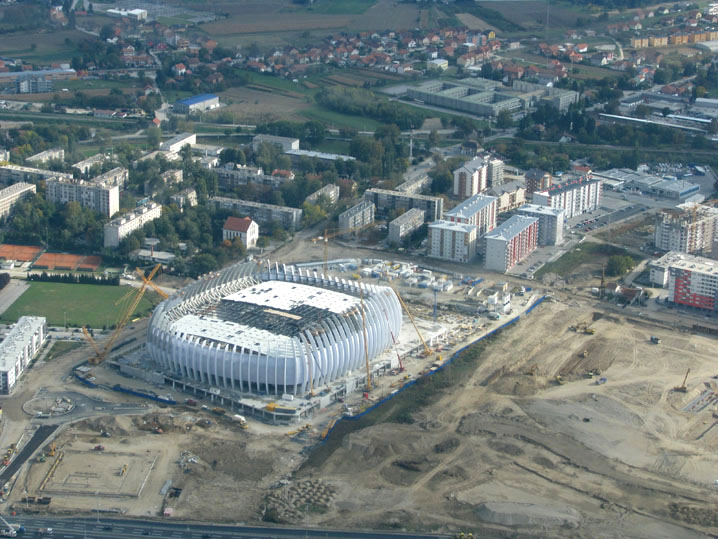
Arena Zagreb under construction, 2008

The Croatian Government and the Zagreb Assembly held a public tender for the construction of a sports hall in order to host games in the 2009 World Men's Handball Championship, and later for numerous other sporting, cultural, and business events.

They selected the consortium composed of property developers TriGránit (from Hungary) and Ingra (from Croatia). The TriGránit/Ingra offer was initially approved on 25 April 2007, but the signing of the final contract was delayed because of Mayor Milan Bandić expressing discontent with the conditions. The Consortium engaged studio UPI-2M from Zagreb as well as studio Decathlon from Athens as an international consultant, specially for this project to create and produce a unique design for Arena Zagreb. The construction of the sports hall finally started on 20 July 2007, and was completed as planned on 15 December 2008.

The arena also hosted the 2018 European Men's Handball Championship with Split, Varaždin and Poreč. and the World Men's Handball Championship again in 2025 with the country, Denmark and Norway.

== Architecture and design ==
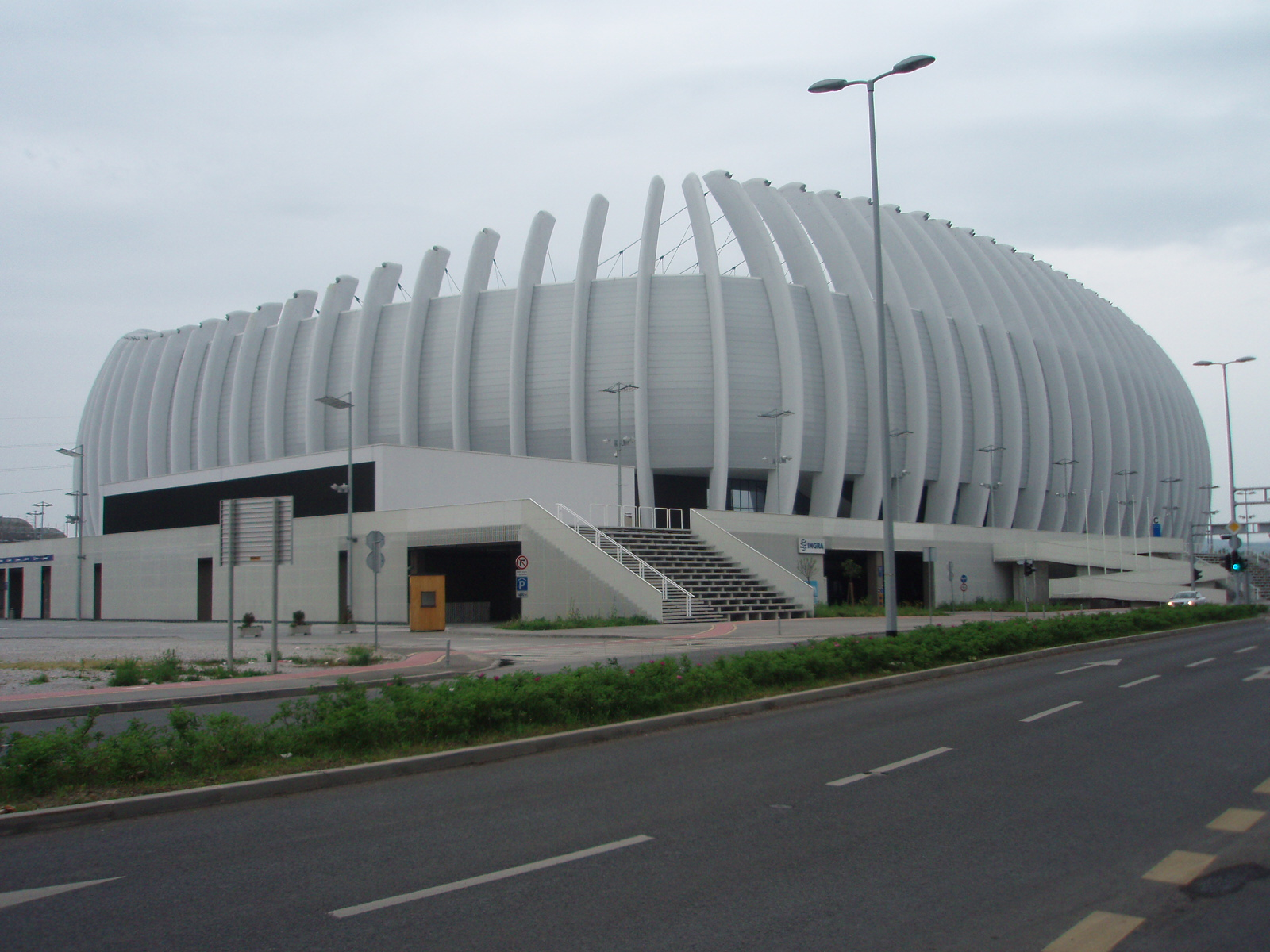
South-East view of Arena Zagreb

The arena was built in a previously undeveloped part of Zagreb that had long been overlooked—marked by a mix of neglected fields and modest residential buildings. Before construction began, the area resembled an urban wasteland more than a future cultural and sports destination.

Located in the southwestern part of Lanište district of (Novi Zagreb), Arena Zagreb is a modern indoor venue designed to accommodate up to 16,500 for sport events and 22,400 spectators for concerts. Originally constructed for the 2009 World Men's Handball Championship, it quickly gained prominence not just for its functionality, but also for its striking architectural presence. Situated near one of the city's major gateways, it stands as a recognizable symbol of the city. Eighty-six massive curved concrete columns create the venue's signature ribbed exterior, wrapping the building like a white oval shell. These are linked by a translucent, double-layered polycarbonate façade that allows for lighting displays. The suspended roof system, supported by these columns, eliminates the need for extensive internal roof structures, creating an open space inside. Features like retractable seating, movable partitions, and multiple configurable zones give it the flexibility needed to host different types of users and gatherings. Additional considerations — such as backstage areas, visitor flow, catering facilities, and acoustics — were all incorporated to ensure a high-quality experience for both performers and attendees. Natural light is excluded from the main hall except when the light-blocking roof domes are opened, a feature that enhances the lighting quality for both live events and television broadcasts. To support its function as a major event venue, surrounding infrastructure was significantly upgraded. New roadways and public utilities were installed, along with bus connections to other parts of the city.

The facility itself spans six levels—one underground and five above—covering a gross built area of 90,340 square meters, all situated on a 29,540-square-meter site. The construction cost averaged €850 per square meter, which includes associated project expenses. Parking includes 926 spaces for cars and 38 for buses or broadcast vans, spread across an underground garage and the adjacent surface level. High groundwater levels prevented deeper underground construction, and the limited footprint of the site didn't allow for surface parking. Biggest shopping Center in Zagreb - Arena Centar was built next to the Arena Zagreb in 2010. The unveiling of the Arena's design triggered a wave of development in the neighborhood. Even before construction finished, new projects began taking shape around the site. Today, the Arena stands as a focal point within a broader urban plan that includes a major shopping and entertainment complex, as well as new residential communities.

Developing spatial and functional characteristics to enable maximum flexibility of the venue was vital during the schematic design stage. The telescopic system of 4,550 seats was a critical element in allowing different configurations and quick turnaround between events. The singular vision also led to provision of spacious facilities for athletes, other performers and event managers, a concept for simple and fluid visitor circulation, a mix of catering facilities and designing in smaller, mutually independent zones that could all be used at the same time. Getting the acoustics right was important too. The steel roof structure had sufficient bearing capacity to enable the suspension of additional stage equipment. The roof structure is close to the structure of a suspension bridge, which is an uncommon approach (in arena design) anywhere in the world. The roof's bearing structure is only 45 cm high, over a span of 110 m, because it is suspended from the upper side of the roof outside and can not be seen from the interior. This solution was made feasible by contemporary cable production technology – the span is suspended on cables that have a diameter of just 66 mm. Each cable can carry 400 tons.

Arena Zagreb won the Structural Design of the Year award at the 2009 World Architecture Festival, and Grand spectacle award at Global BBR 2010.

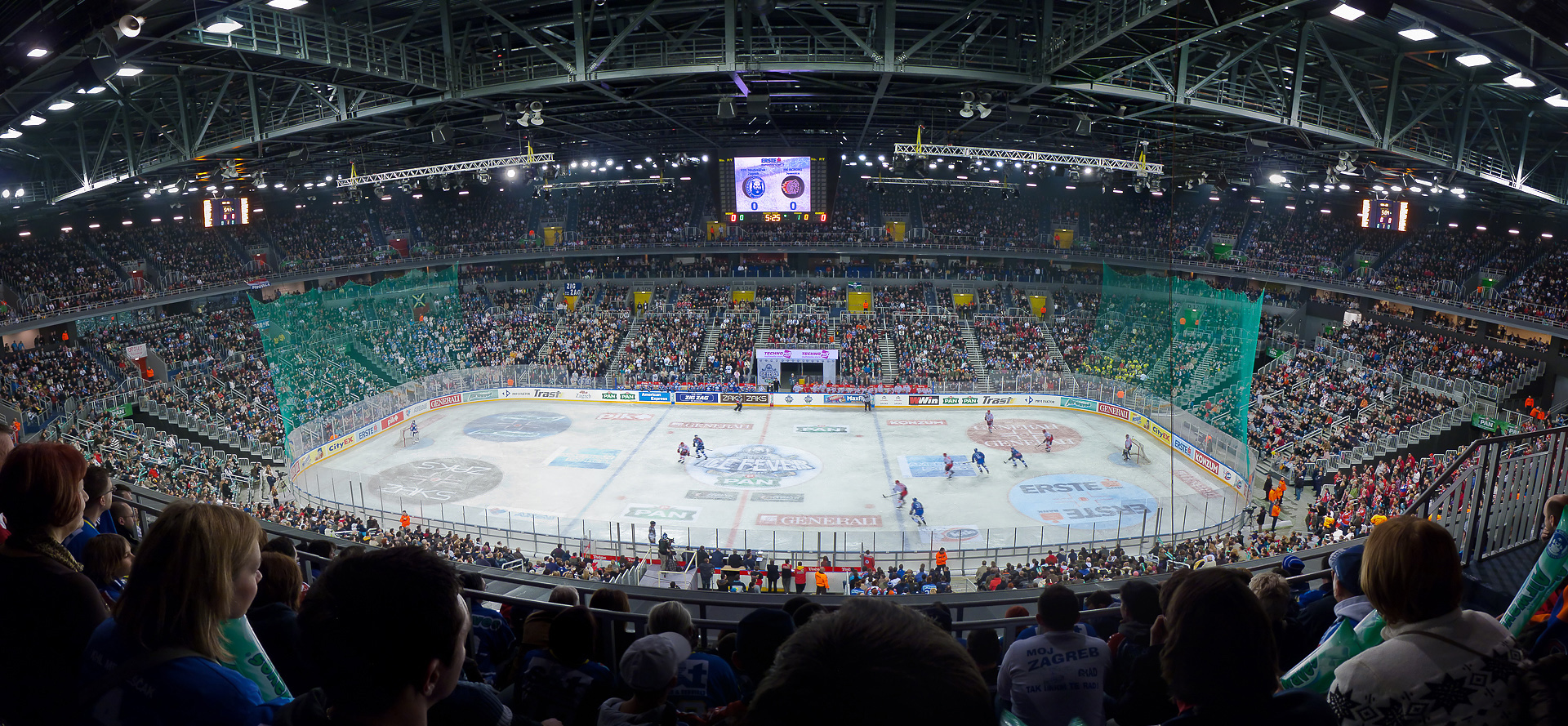
View of Zagreb Arena inside.

== Concerts and events ==
Date	Event	Attendance	Type	Note
2008
December 27, 2008	Croatia - Russia	15,200	Sport (Handball)	Opening sport event
2009
January 17, 2009	Prljavo Kazalište	22,400	Concert	Grand opening event
January 24, 2009	Slovakia - South Korea	3,000	Sport (Handball)	2009 World Men's Handball Championship
January 24, 2009	France - Sweden	13,000	Sport (Handball)	2009 World Men's Handball Championship
January 24, 2009	Hungary - Croatia	15,000	Sport (Handball)	2009 World Men's Handball Championship
January 25, 2009	Sweden - Hungary	4,000	Sport (Handball)	2009 World Men's Handball Championship
January 25, 2009	South Korea - France	10,000	Sport (Handball)	2009 World Men's Handball Championship
January 25, 2009	Croatia - Slovakia	15,000	Sport (Handball)	2009 World Men's Handball Championship
January 27, 2009	Hungary - South Korea	800	Sport (Handball)	2009 World Men's Handball Championship
January 27, 2009	Slovakia - Sweden	10,000	Sport (Handball)	2009 World Men's Handball Championship
January 27, 2009	France - Croatia	15,000	Sport (Handball)	2009 World Men's Handball Championship
January 30, 2009	Croatia - Poland	15,000	Sport (Handball)	2009 World Men's Handball Championship
February 1, 2009	Denmark - Poland	8,000	Sport (Handball)	2009 World Men's Handball Championship
February 1, 2009	France - Croatia	15,000	Sport (Handball)	2009 World Men's Handball Championship
March 8, 2009	Zdravko Čolić	20,000	Concert	
April 19, 2009	Mišo Kovač	15,000	Concert	
April 26, 2009	Beyoncé	17,190	Concert	I Am... World Tour
May 11, 2009	London Symphony Orchestra	10,500	Concert	
May 23, 2009	Tony Cetinski	19,000	Concert	Furia Tour
May 24, 2009	Tony Cetinski	18,000	Concert	Furia Tour
June 13, 2009	Lepa Brena	16,500	Concert	Uđi slobodno Tour
July 4, 2009	Croatian Democratic Union Convention	10,000	Convention	Political party convention
September 25–27, 2009	Kids Fair 2009		Fair	
October 1, 2009	European Day of the Entrepreneur		Event	
October 7, 2009	RK Zagreb – Alingsas HK	8,500	Sport (Handball)	EHF Champions League
October 9–11, 2009	Weeding Fair 2009		Fair	
October 14–18, 2009	Eko-Etno Fair 2009		Fair	
October 23, 2009	Halid Bešlić	23,000	Concert	
October 24, 2009	Halid Bešlić	22,500	Concert	
November 7, 2009	Eros Ramazzotti	15,000	Concert	Ali e radici Tour
November 20, 2009	Miroslav Škoro	20,000	Concert	
November 27, 2009	The Backstreet Boys	13,000	Concert	This Is Us Tour
December 11–13, 2009	Disney on Ice	27,000	Show	6 shows were held in 3 days
December 16, 2009	Parni Valjak	21,000	Concert	Karlovačko Live
December 19, 2009	José Carreras	10,000	Concert	
December 29, 2009	"You can do it"	8,000	Fundraising concert	
2010
February 5–7, 2010	Weeding Fair 2010		Fair	
February 13, 2010	RK Zagreb – FCK Håndbold	9,500	Sport (Handball)	EHF Champions League
February 14, 2010	Depeche Mode	18,500	Concert	Tour of the Universe
February 20, 2010	RK Zagreb – Fyllingen Handball	7,000	Sport (Handball)	EHF Champions League
February 28, 2010	RK Zagreb – BM Ciudad Real	15,000	Sport (Handball)	EHF Champions League
March 7, 2010	RK Zagreb – HSV Hamburg	15,000	Sport (Handball)	EHF Champions League
March 8, 2010	Miroslav Ilić	10,000	Concert	
March 13, 2010	Plavi orkestar	15,000	Concert	
March 18, 2010	Rammstein	13,000	Concert	Liebe ist für alle da Tour
March 27, 2010	RK Zagreb – FC Barcelona	13,000	Sport (Handball)	EHF Champions League
April 9–11, 2010	Beauty & Lifestyle Show 2010		Fair	
April 14–18, 2010	Walking with Dinosaurs	29,000	Show	7 shows were held in 5 days
April 23, 2010	KK Partizan – KK Hemofarm	3,000	Sport (Basketball)	NLB League Final Four 2010
April 23, 2010	KK Cibona – KK Union Olimpija	11,000	Sport (Basketball)	NLB League Final Four 2010
April 25, 2010	KK Cibona – KK Partizan	15,600	Sport (Basketball)	NLB League Final Four 2010
May 15, 2010	Željko Samardžić	11,000	Concert	
May 20, 2010	Za dobra stara vremena	13,000	Musical	
May 22, 2010	David Guetta	16,000	Concert	
July 25, 2010	Leonard Cohen	12,000	Concert	
September 17–19, 2010	Zagreb Auto Moto Show	8,000	Show	
September 24, 2010	Guns N' Roses	15,000	Concert	Chinese Democracy Tour
October 1–3, 2010	Kids Fair 2010		Fair	
October 16, 2010	RK Zagreb – BM Ciudad Real	7,000	Sport (Handball)	EHF Champions League
October 21, 2010	Oliver Dragojević	15,000	Concert	
November 5, 2010	Lady Gaga	17,000	Concert	The Monster Ball Tour
November 8, 2010	Sting and The Royal Philharmonic Orchestra	10,000	Concert	Symphonicity Tour
November 13, 2010	Topstars	15,000	Show	Variety Concert
November 17–21, 2010	Cirque du Soleil	27,000	Show	Saltimbanco
November 28, 2010	RK Zagreb – SG Flensburg-Handewitt	10,000	Sport (Handball)	EHF Champions League
December 4, 2010	RK Zagreb – RK Bosna Sarajevo	7,500	Sport (Handball)	EHF Champions League
December 10, 2010	Željko Joksimović	17,000	Concert	
December 16, 2010	Halid Bešlić and Crvena jabuka	18,000	Concert	Karlovačko Live
December 18, 2010	Đorđe Balašević	19,000	Concert	
December 19, 2010	Đorđe Balašević	5,000	Film Projection	"Kao Rani Mraz" Projection
2011
January 21, 2011	KHL Medveščak - KAC	15,000	Sport (Ice hockey)	Erste Bank Eishockey Liga
January 23, 2011	KHL Medveščak - Vienna Capitals	15,200	Sport (Ice hockey)	Erste Bank Eishockey Liga
January 25, 2011	KHL Medveščak - Olimpija	15,000	Sport (Ice hockey)	Erste Bank Eishockey Liga
January 28, 2011	KHL Medveščak - Villach	15,000	Sport (Ice hockey)	Erste Bank Eishockey Liga
February 4–6, 2011	Weeding Fair 2011		Fair	
February 19, 2011	RK Zagreb - HCM Constanța	7,000	Sport (Handball)	EHF Champions League
March 5, 2011	RK Zagreb - St. Petersburg HC	8,000	Sport (Handball)	EHF Champions League
March 27, 2011	RK Zagreb - Rhein-Neckar Löwen	7,000	Sport (Handball)	EHF Champions League
April 6, 2011	Slayer and Megadeth	4,000	Concert	European carnage tour
April 13, 2011	Roger Waters	17,004	Concert	The Wall Live
May 11, 2011	Shakira	10,000	Concert	The Sun Comes Out World Tour
June 1, 2011	Joe Cocker	6,000	Concert	
July 4, 2011	Symphony of a Thousand	8,000	Concert	
September 9–11, 2011	Kids Fair 2011		Fair	
September 15, 2011	Youth Sport Games	10,000	Event	Closing Ceremony
September 17, 2011	Croatian Democratic Union Convention	10,000	Convention	
September 20, 2011	George Michael	12,000	Concert	Symphonica Tour
September 24–25, 2011	Beauty & Lifestyle Fair 2011		Fair	
September 29, 2011	RK Zagreb – IK Sävehof	2,500	Sport (Handball)	EHF Champions League
October 1, 2011	Britney Spears	10,000	Concert	Femme Fatale Tour
October 7, 2011	Hladno Pivo	13,000	Concert	
October 8, 2011	RK Zagreb - RK Bosna Sarajevo	5,500	Sport (Handball)	EHF Champions League
October 11, 2011	Jean Michel Jarre	3,000	Concert	
October 21, 2011	Plácido Domingo	9,000	Concert	
October 22, 2011	RK Zagreb - FC Barcelona	12,300	Sport (Handball)	EHF Champions League
October 26, 2011	KK Zagreb - Panathinaikos BC	3,000	Sport (Basketball)	Euroleague
November 2, 2011	KK Zagreb - PBC CSKA Moscow	2,000	Sport (Basketball)	Euroleague
November 8, 2011	Rammstein & Deathstars	12,000	Concert	Made in Germany 1995-2011 (tour)
November 11, 2011	Parni Valjak	14,000	Concert	
November 16, 2011	KK Zagreb - Žalgiris Kaunas	2,000	Sport (Basketball)	Euroleague
November 17, 2011	Lenny Kravitz	5,000	Concert	Black and White Tour
November 21, 2011	Tom Jones	6,000	Concert	
November 22, 2011	Sade	10,000	Concert	Sade Live
November 24, 2011	KK Zagreb - Brose Baskets	2,500	Sport (Basketball)	Euroleague
November 26, 2011	RK Zagreb - Chambéry Savoie Handball	9,000	Sport (Handball)	EHF Champions League
December 8, 2011	Tomislav Bralić & Klapa Intrade	12,000	Concert	
December 14, 2011	KK Zagreb - Unicaja Malaga	3,000	Sport (Basketball)	Euroleague
December 16, 2011	Jelena Rozga & Bajaga	11,000	Concert	Karlovačko Live
December 22, 2011	Dino Merlin	20,000	Concert	
2012
January 8, 2012	KHL Medveščak - HK Acroni Jesenice	15,200	Sport (Ice hockey)	Erste Bank Eishockey Liga
January 10, 2012	KHL Medveščak - Alba Volán Székesfehérvár	14,700	Sport (Ice hockey)	Erste Bank Eishockey Liga
January 13, 2012	KHL Medveščak - KAC	15,200	Sport (Ice hockey)	Erste Bank Eishockey Liga
January 15, 2012	KHL Medveščak - EC VSV	15,200	Sport (Ice hockey)	Erste Bank Eishockey Liga
January 17, 2012	KHL Medveščak - HDD Olimpija Ljubljana	15,000	Sport (Ice hockey)	Erste Bank Eishockey Liga
January 20, 2012	KHL Medveščak - EC Red Bull Salzburg	15,200	Sport (Ice hockey)	Erste Bank Eishockey Liga
January 22, 2012	KHL Medveščak - EHC Black Wings Linz	15,000	Sport (Ice hockey)	Erste Bank Eishockey Liga
January 31, 2012	Spain - Slovenia	5,300	Sport (Futsal)	2012 UEFA Futsal Championship
February 1, 2012	Portugal - Azerbaijan	2,200	Sport (Futsal)	2012 UEFA Futsal Championship
February 2, 2012	Slovenia - Ukraine	2,200	Sport (Futsal)	2012 UEFA Futsal Championship
February 3, 2012	Azerbaijan - Serbia	2,300	Sport (Futsal)	2012 UEFA Futsal Championship
February 4, 2012	Ukraine - Spain	3,500	Sport (Futsal)	2012 UEFA Futsal Championship
February 5, 2012	Serbia - Portugal	2,300	Sport (Futsal)	2012 UEFA Futsal Championship
February 6, 2012	Romania - Spain	1,500	Sport (Futsal)	2012 UEFA Futsal Championship
February 7, 2012	Italy - Portugal	2,200	Sport (Futsal)	2012 UEFA Futsal Championship
February 9, 2012	Croatia - Russia	14,300	Sport (Futsal)	2012 UEFA Futsal Championship
February 9, 2012	Spain - Italy	14,300	Sport (Futsal)	2012 UEFA Futsal Championship
February 11, 2012	Croatia - Italy	10,000	Sport (Futsal)	2012 UEFA Futsal Championship
February 11, 2012	Russia - Spain	10,000	Sport (Futsal)	2012 UEFA Futsal Championship
February 17–19, 2012	Weeding Fair 2012		Fair	
March 2–4, 2012	Croatian Food and Wine Festival		Fair	
March 8, 2012	Zdravko Čolić	17,000	Concert	
March 10, 2012	Mirko Filipović vs. Ray Sefo	18,000	Sport (K-1)	Cro Cop Final Fight
March 24, 2012	RK Zagreb - FK Metalurg Skopje		Sport (Handball)	EHF Champions League
April 14, 2012	HT Tatran Prešov - FK Metalurg Skopje	500	Sport (Handball)	SEHA League Final
April 14, 2012	RK Zagreb - HC Vardar PRO - Skopje	2,500	Sport (Handball)	SEHA League Final
April 15, 2012	RK Zagreb - HT Tatran Prešov		Sport (Handball)	SEHA League Final
April 15, 2012	FK Metalurg Skopje - HC Vardar PRO - Skopje		Sport (Handball)	SEHA League Final
April 21, 2012	RK Zagreb - THW Kiel		Sport (Handball)	EHF Champions League
June 12, 2012	2Cellos	20,000	Concert	Live at Arena Zagreb
June 27, 2012	Sting	5,000	Concert	Back to Bass Tour
September 17, 2012	Il Divo		Concert	Il Divo & Orchestra in Concert – World Tour
September 21–23, 2012	Kids Fair 2012		Fair	
October 20, 2012	RK Zagreb - FC Barcelona Handbol		Sport (Handball)	EHF Champions League
October 27–28, 2012	World Cat Show 2012		Show	
November 2–4, 2012	Disney on Ice		Show	
2013
January 13, 2013	Arena Ice Fever 2013		Sport (Ice hockey)	Pan Ice Fever
January 18, 2013	Arena Ice Fever 2013		Sport (Ice hockey)	Pan Ice Fever
January 20, 2013	Arena Ice Fever 2013		Sport (Ice hockey)	Pan Ice Fever
January 25, 2013	Arena Ice Fever 2013		Sport (Ice hockey)	Pan Ice Fever
January 27, 2013	Arena Ice Fever 2013		Sport (Ice hockey)	Pan Ice Fever
February 9, 2013	RK Croatia Osiguranje Zagreb - HC Dinamo Minsk		Sport (Handball)	EHF Champions League
February 15, 2013	Sajam vjenčanja		Fair	
February 23, 2013	RK Croatia Osiguranje Zagreb - Kadetten Schaffhausen		Sport (Handball)	EHF Champions League
March 15, 2013	K-1 World Grand Prix		Kickbox tournament	
March 30, 2013	Masters of Dirt		Motocross show	
April 17, 2013	Beyoncé	16,920	Concert	The Mrs. Carter Show World Tour
May 11, 2013	Severina	19,000	Concert	Dobrodošao u Klub Tour
May 23, 2013	Depeche Mode	15,969	Concert	Delta Machine Tour
May 25, 2013	We Will Rock You		Musical	
June 16–21, 2013	European Senior Fencing Championships		Fencing Champhionship	
July 31, 2013	Iron Maiden		Concert	Maiden England World Tour
September 4–6, 2013	Repro Lignum		Fair	International fair wood industry
September 21, 2013	RK Croatia Osiguranje Zagreb - Celje Pivovarna Laško		Sport (Handball)	EHF Champions League
September 27, 2013	Dječiji sajam		Fair	Kids Fair
October 20, 2013	RK Croatia Osiguranje Zagreb - Veszprém KC		Sport (Handball)	EHF Champions League
October 25, 2013	Final Fight Championship		Boxing Championship	
October 27, 2013	RK Croatia Osiguranje Zagreb - Vardar PRO		Sport (Handball)	EHF Champions League
November 23, 2013	RK Croatia Osiguranje Zagreb - Rhein Neckar Lowen		Sport (Handball)	EHF Champions League
December 3, 2013	RK Croatia Osiguranje Zagreb - Lovćen Cetinje		Sport (Handball)	EHF Champions League
December 7, 2013	RK Croatia Osiguranje Zagreb - Metalurg		Sport (Handball)	EHF Champions League
December 27, 2013	KHL Medveščak Zagreb - HC Dynamo Moscow		Sport (Ice hockey)	Arena Ice Fever
December 27, 2013	KHL Medveščak Zagreb - HC Vityaz		Sport (Ice hockey)	Arena Ice Fever
2014
January 23, 2014	Arena Ice Fever 2013./14.		Sports/Entertainment	Ice skating event during winter season
January 25, 2014	Arena Ice Fever 2013./14.		Sports/Entertainment	Ice skating event during winter season
January 27, 2014	Arena Ice Fever 2013./14.		Sports/Entertainment	Ice skating event during winter season
February 8, 2014	Croatia osiguranje Zagreb vs. Motor Zaporožje		Handball (Champions League)	EHF Champions League match
February 14, 2014	Sajam vjenčanja 2014.		Fair/Expo	Wedding fair held from February 14–16
February 22, 2014	Croatia osiguranje Zagreb vs. St. Petersburg		Handball (Champions League)	EHF Champions League match
February 25, 2014	Croatia osiguranje Zagreb vs. Meshkov Brest		Handball (SEHA League)	SEHA League handball match
March 8, 2014	Mirko "Cro Cop" Filipović vs. Remy Bonjasky		Boxing Championship	Glory World Series
March 21, 2014	Halid Bešlić & prijatelji		Concert	
April 3, 2014	2. Hrvatski festival hrane & vina		Food & Wine Festival	Held from April 3–5, culinary and wine exhibition
June 7, 2014	Inter Cars		Corporate/Automotive Event	Automotive industry event by Inter Cars, started at 10:00h
July 3, 2014	Top Gear Live		Entertainment Show	Live automotive show with two sessions at 18:00h and 21:30h
August 26, 2014	Croatia vs. Lithuania		Basketball (Friendly)	International basketball friendly match
September 28, 2014	RK PPD Zagreb vs. THW Kiel		Handball (Champions League)	EHF Champions League match
September 30, 2014	Il Divo		Concert	Live concert as part of “A Musical Affair” tour
October 1, 2014	Cesar Millan		Live Show	Dog behaviorist live show
October 3, 2014	Dječji sajam 2014.		Fair/Expo	Children's fair held from October 3–5
October 11, 2014	RK PPD Zagreb vs. RK Metalurg		Handball (Champions League)	EHF Champions League match
October 22, 2014	YAMATO		Cultural Show	Japanese Taiko drumming performance
November 15, 2014	20th Zagreb Croatia Open Taekwondo		Martial Arts	International taekwondo tournament, Nov 15–16
November 23, 2014	RK PPD Zagreb vs. Meshkov Brest		Handball (Champions League)	EHF Champions League match
November 29, 2014	Andrea Bocelli		Concert	
December 5, 2014	Disney on Ice – Festival ledene čarolije		Ice Show/Family	Ice show held from Dec 5–7
December 9, 2014	RK PPD Zagreb vs. Paris Saint-Germain		Handball (Champions League)	EHF Champions League match
December 14, 2014	EHF EURO 2014 Women		Handball (Women's Euro)	Women's European Championship held Dec 14–17
December 20, 2014	Marko Perković Thompson	22,000	Concert	Ora et labora Tour
2015
February 6, 2015	Sajam vjenčanja 2015		Fair/Expo	Wedding fair held from February 6–8
February 14, 2015	RK PPD Zagreb vs. La Rioja		Handball (Champions League)	EHF Champions League
March 7, 2015	Zdravko Čolić		Concert	
March 14, 2015	RK PPD Zagreb vs. KIF Kolding Kopenhagen		Handball (Champions League)	EHF Champions League
April 9, 2015	RK PPD Zagreb vs. FC Barcelona		Handball (Champions League)	EHF Champions League
April 11, 2015	Ennio Morricone	4,000	Concert	
June 17, 2015	REPRO LIGNUM – Međunarodni sajam za drvnu industriju		Industry Expo	Wood industry fair held from June 17–19
August 14, 2015	Croatia vs. Germany		Basketball (Friendly)	International basketball friendly match
August 26, 2015	EuroBasket 2015 – Test Tournament		Basketball (Test Tournament)	
August 27, 2015	EuroBasket 2015 – Test Tournament		Basketball (Test Tournament)	
August 28, 2015	EuroBasket 2015 – Test Tournament		Basketball (Test Tournament)	
September 5, 2015	EuroBasket 2015		Basketball (EuroBasket)	
September 6, 2015	EuroBasket 2015		Basketball (EuroBasket)	
September 8, 2015	EuroBasket 2015		Basketball (EuroBasket)	
September 9, 2015	EuroBasket 2015		Basketball (EuroBasket)	
September 10, 2015	EuroBasket 2015		Basketball (EuroBasket)	
September 17, 2015	RK PPD Zagreb vs. THW Kiel		Handball (Champions League)	EHF Champions League
October 3, 2015	RK PPD Zagreb vs. Veszprém		Handball (Champions League)	EHF Champions League
October 16, 2015	Lord of the Dance		Dance Show	
October 17, 2015	RK PPD Zagreb vs. SPR Wisła Płock		Handball (Champions League)	EHF Champions League
November 13, 2015	3. Hrvatski festival hrane i vina		Food & Wine Festival	
November 21, 2015	RK PPD Zagreb vs. SG Flensburg-Handewitt		Handball (Champions League)	EHF Champions League
November 26, 2015	RK PPD Zagreb vs. Beşiktaş Jimnastik Kulübü		Handball (Champions League)	EHF Champions League
November 28, 2015	Bijelo Dugme	20,000	Concert	
December 10, 2015	Disney on Ice		Ice Show/Family	
2016
January 23, 2016	Mate Mišo Kovač		Concert	
February 5, 2016	Sajam vjenčanja 2016		Fair/Expo	
February 10, 2016	RK PPD Zagreb vs. Paris Saint-Germain		Handball (Champions League)	EHF Champions League
February 13, 2016	Željko Joksimović		Concert	
February 27, 2016	RK PPD Zagreb vs. Celje		Handball (Champions League)	EHF Champions League
March 8, 2016	Tony Cetinski		Concert	
March 11, 2016	ICE – International Charter Expo		Business Expo	Yacht charter expo held from March 11–13
March 19, 2016	RK PPD Zagreb vs. Rhein-Neckar Löwen		Handball (Champions League)	EHF Champions League
April 10, 2016	UFC Fight Night: Rothwell vs. dos Santos	13,177	MMA Event	First UFC event in Croatia
April 23, 2016	RK PPD Zagreb vs. Paris Saint-Germain		Handball (Champions League)	EHF Champions League
May 8, 2016	Enrique Iglesias		Concert	Sex and Love Tour
May 20, 2016	Boban Rajović		Concert	
September 16, 2016	InDizajn – Festival modernog doma		Design Expo	Interior design festival held from September 16–18
October 1, 2016	RK PPD Zagreb vs. Pick Szeged		Handball (Champions League)	EHF Champions League
October 15, 2016	RK PPD Zagreb vs. Meshkov Brest		Handball (Champions League)	EHF Champions League
October 22, 2016	RK PPD Zagreb vs. Vardar		Handball (Champions League)	EHF Champions League
November 4, 2016	International Charter Expo		Business Expo	Yacht charter expo held from November 4–6
November 9, 2016	Justin Bieber	18,000	Concert	Purpose Tour
November 12, 2016	22nd Zagreb Croatia Open – Taekwondo		Martial Arts	Taekwondo tournament held November 12–13
November 25, 2016	Davis Cup 2016	45,000	Tennis	Croatia vs. Argentina, held from November 25–27
December 1, 2016	RK PPD Zagreb vs. Rhein-Neckar Löwen		Handball (Champions League)	EHF Champions League match
December 3, 2016	Dino Merlin		Concert	
December 9, 2016	Marvel Universe LIVE!		Family/Show	
December 17, 2016	FFC 27		MMA/Kickboxing	Final Fight Championship
December 26, 2016	Đorđe Balašević		Concert	
December 31, 2016	Arena 360 NYE		New Year’s Eve Party	
2017
January 25, 2017	Moskovski cirkus na ledu		Ice Show/Circus	
February 3, 2017	Sajam vjenčanja 2017		Fair/Expo	Wedding fair held from February 3–5
February 9, 2017	Gregorian		Concert	
February 11, 2017	Ivan Zak		Concert	
February 25, 2017	RK PPD Zagreb vs. IFK Kristianstad		Handball (Champions League)	EHF Champions League
March 4, 2017	Maša I Medvjed		Children's Show	
March 9, 2017	RK PPD Zagreb vs. RK Celje Pivovarna Laško		Handball (Champions League)	EHF Champions League match
March 11, 2017	Oliver Dragojević – Oliverovih 70		Concert	
March 17, 2017	Place2Go		Tourism Expo	Travel and tourism fair held March 17–19
March 22, 2017	Cats!		Musical/Theatre	
March 25, 2017	RK PPD Zagreb vs. Veszprém		Handball (Champions League)	EHF Champions League
May 13, 2017	Aca Lukas		Concert	
May 16, 2017	Deep Purple		Concert	The Long Goodbye Tour
June 3, 2017	Ansambl LADO		Cultural Performance	
June 15, 2017	André Rieu		Concert	
September 6, 2017	ReproLignum – Međunarodni sajam za drvnu industriju		Industry Expo	
September 14, 2017	InDizajn Festival		Design Expo	
September 23, 2017	RK PPD Zagreb vs. Pick Szeged		Handball (Champions League)	EHF Champions League
October 8, 2017	RK PPD Zagreb vs. Wisła Płock		Handball (Champions League)	EHF Champions League
October 14, 2017	The Great Gatsby		Theatre/Performance	
October 21, 2017	Gibonni		Concert	
October 28, 2017	Croatia vs. Slovenia		Basketball (Friendly)	International friendly basketball match
November 9, 2017	Bryan Adams		Concert	
November 11, 2017	RK PPD Zagreb vs. HC Vardar		Handball (Champions League)	EHF Champions League
November 17, 2017	Dubioza Kolektiv		Concert	
November 23, 2017	RK PPD Zagreb vs. FC Barcelona		Handball (Champions League)	EHF Champions League
November 25, 2017	Petar Grašo		Concert	Live concert by Petar Grašo
November 29, 2017	RK PPD Zagreb vs. Rhein-Neckar Löwen		Handball (Champions League)	EHF Champions League
December 1, 2017	Parni Valjak		Concert	
December 8, 2017	Disney On Ice		Ice Show/Family	
December 21, 2017	Sarah Brightman		Concert	
December 26, 2017	Đorđe Balašević		Concert	
2018
January 12, 2018	EHF EURO 2018		Handball Tournament	European Men's Handball Championship
February 2, 2018	Rod Stewart		Concert	
February 9, 2018	Sajam vjenčanja		Fair/Expo	Wedding fair held February 9–11
February 14, 2018	Halid Bešlić		Concert	
February 17, 2018	RK PPD Zagreb vs. HBC Nantes		Handball (Champions League)	EHF Champions League
March 4, 2018	RK PPD Zagreb vs. IFK Kristianstad		Handball (Champions League)	EHF Champions League
March 10, 2018	Andrea Bocelli		Concert	
March 16, 2018	PLACE2GO 2018		Tourism Expo	
March 23, 2018	2Cellos		Concert	
April 8, 2018	Lord of the Dance		Dance Show	
May 6, 2018	Roger Waters		Concert	
May 19, 2018	André Rieu		Concert	
July 24, 2018	Iron Maiden		Concert	
July 27, 2018	IJF World Judo Tour		Sports Tournament	
August 1, 2018	ETC – Međunarodni turnir u strateškim igrama		Esports/Gaming	Strategy games tournament held August 1–5
September 8, 2018	Filip Hrgović – The Homecoming		Boxing	Professional boxing event
September 13, 2018	InDizajn 2018		Design Expo	
September 29, 2018	RK PPD Zagreb vs. Paris Saint-Germain		Handball (Champions League)	EHF Champions League
October 13, 2018	David Garrett		Concert	
October 20, 2018	Zdravko Čolić		Concert	
October 21, 2018	Totalni JoomBoos		Youth/Influencer Event	
October 27, 2018	Jason Derulo		Concert	
November 2, 2018	International Charter Expo '18		Business Expo	Yacht charter industry expo held November 2–4
November 10, 2018	RK PPD Zagreb vs. RK Celje		Handball (Champions League)	EHF Champions League
November 24, 2018	RK PPD Zagreb vs. HBC Nantes		Handball (Champions League)	EHF Champions League
December 1, 2018	Klapa Intrade		Concert	
December 7, 2018	Cirque du Soleil – Toruk: The First Flight		Circus/Theatre	
December 15, 2018	Saša Matić		Concert	
December 16, 2018	Saša Matić		Concert	Second night
December 21, 2018	Il Volo		Concert	
2019
February 15, 2019	Željko Joksimović		Concert	
February 16, 2019	Željko Joksimović		Concert	
March 3, 2019	Bajaga i Instruktori		Concert	
September 16, 2019	Michael Bublé		Concert	An Evening with Michael Bublé
October 18, 2019	Prljavo kazalište		Concert	
October 19, 2019	Prljavo kazalište		Concert	
November 9, 2019	KSW 51		Sport (MMA)	
November 30, 2019	Doris Dragović		Concert	
December 1, 2019	Enrique Iglesias		Concert	All The Hits Live (Enrique Iglesias)
December 7, 2019	Severina	23,000	Concert	The Magic Tour
December 14, 2019	Lepa Brena	20,000	Concert	Zar je važno da l' se peva ili pjeva... World Tour
December 15, 2019	Lepa Brena	20,000	Concert	Zar je važno da l' se peva ili pjeva... World Tour
2020
January 31, 2020	Sajam vjenčanja 2020		Fair/Expo	Wedding fair held January 31 – February 2
February 8, 2020	RK PPD Zagreb vs. SG Flensburg		Handball (Champions League)	EHF Champions League
February 14, 2020	Sergej Ćetković		Concert	
February 22, 2020	RK PPD Zagreb vs. Aalborg Håndbold		Handball (Champions League)	EHF Champions League
March 7, 2020	Nina Badrić		Concert	
March 13, 2020	PLACE2GO		Tourism Expo	
April 18, 2020	Parni Valjak		Concert	
2021
September 15, 2021	RK PPD Zagreb vs. Aalborg Håndbold		Handball (Champions League)	EHF Champions League
September 29, 2021	RK PPD Zagreb vs. Elverum Handball		Handball (Champions League)	EHF Champions League
October 7, 2021	ArhiBau		Architecture Expo	
October 16, 2021	Aura Cup Zagreb 2021		Gymnastics	International rhythmic gymnastics tournament (October 16–17)
October 27, 2021	RK PPD Zagreb vs. Montpellier HB		Handball (Champions League)	EHF Champions League
November 24, 2021	RK PPD Zagreb vs. HC Meshkov Brest		Handball (Champions League)	EHF Champions League
December 8, 2021	RK PPD Zagreb vs. HC Vardar 1961		Handball (Champions League)	EHF Champions League
2022
February 26, 2022	Petar Grašo		Concert	
March 19, 2022	Petar Grašo		Concert	
March 26, 2022	Parni Valjak		Concert	
April 2, 2022	Željko Samardžić		Concert	U Ime Ljubavi Tour
April 18, 2022	Željko Joksimović		Concert	
May 7, 2022	Vanna		Concert	
May 22, 2022	Iron Maiden	23,000	Concert	Legacy of the Beast World Tour
October 21, 2022	Saša Matić		Concert	Dva života Tour
October 22, 2022	Saša Matić		Concert	Dva života Tour
October 31, 2022	Sting	15,000	Concert	My Songs Tour
November 25, 2022	André Rieu and His Johann Strauss Orchestra		Concert	
December 3, 2022	Halid Bešlić		Concert	
December 17, 2022	Jelena Rozga		Concert	Minut Srca Mog Tour
December 26, 2022	Zdravko Čolić		Concert	
2023
February 11, 2023	Aco Pejović		Concert	
8,10 March 2023	Gibonni		Concert	
February 14, 2023	Crvena Jabuka	22,000	Concert	Tamo gdje ljubav počinje
July 23, 2023	Depeche Mode		Concert	Memento Mori World Tour
June 8, 2023	Amira Medunjanin		Concert	
June 10, 2023	Damir Urban		Concert	
October 17, 2023	50 Cent		Concert	The Final Lap Tour
October 25, 2023	Stjepan Hauser		Concert	
October 28, 2023	Željko Bebek		Concert	
November 25, 2023	Doris Dragović		Concert	
November 26, 2023	Doris Dragović		Concert	
December 1, 2023	Aleksandra Prijović	17,000	Concert	Od Istoka Do Zapada Tour
December 2, 2023	Aleksandra Prijović	17,000	Concert	Od Istoka Do Zapada Tour
December 3, 2023	Aleksandra Prijović	17,000	Concert	Od Istoka Do Zapada Tour
December 4, 2023	Aleksandra Prijović	17,000	Concert	Od Istoka Do Zapada Tour
December 6, 2023	Aleksandra Prijović	17,000	Concert	Od Istoka Do Zapada Tour
December 8, 2023	Dino Merlin	22,000	Concert	
December 9, 2023	Dino Merlin	22,000	Concert	
December 15, 2023	Dino Merlin	22,000	Concert	
December 16, 2023	Dino Merlin	22,000	Concert	
December 22, 2023	Goran Bare & Majke		Concert	
2024
February 9, 2024	MEGADANCE Party		Concert	
February 14, 2024	Aco Pejović		Concert	
16–18 February 2024	WAKO EUROPEAN CUP Zagreb Open		Sport (kickboxing)	WAKO Kickboxing
March 8, 2024	Marija Šerifović		Concert	
25–28 April 2024	European Judo Championships		Sport (judo)	
May 4, 2024	Dragana Mirković		Concert	
May 5, 2024	Dragana Mirković		Concert	
May 27, 2024	Sting	13,000	Concert	
May 31, 2024	Tony Cetinski		Concert	
June 21, 2024	Milica Pavlović	10.000	Concert	Lav Tour
October 12, 2024	Psihomodo Pop		Concert	Vjerujem u Čuda Tour
October 19, 2024	Bajaga		Concert	Samo nam je ljubav potrebna Tour
October 26, 2024	Dražen Zečić		Concert	
November 11, 2024	Novi Fosili		Concert	Za dobra stara vremena
November 25, 2024	Aleksandra Prijović		Concert	Od Istoka Do Zapada Tour
November 30, 2024	Nina Badrić		Concert	
December 6, 2024	Lepa Brena		Concert	Imam pesmu da vam pevam Tour
December 7, 2024	Lepa Brena		Concert	Imam pesmu da vam pevam Tour
December 9, 2024	Lepa Brena		Concert	Imam pesmu da vam pevam Tour
December 12, 2024	Prljavo Kazalište		Concert	Stare navike Tour
December 13, 2024	Prljavo Kazalište		Concert	Stare navike Tour
December 14, 2024	Prljavo Kazalište		Concert	Stare navike Tour
2025
January 14 - February 2, 2025	2025 World Men's Handball Championship		Handball World Championship Tournament	World Championship
February 5, 2025	Zagreb Open 2025		Wrestling Competition	
February 14, 2025	Plavi Orkestar		Concert	
February 15, 2025	Dalmatino		Concert	
February 19, 2025	RK Zagreb vs. Kolstad Håndball		Handball tournament	EHF Champions League
February 22, 2025	Lexington		Concert	Dođi ove noći Tour
February 27, 2025	GAST sajam		Fair	Gastronomy Fair
February 28, 2025	GAST sajam		Fair	Gastronomy Fair
February 29, 2025	GAST sajam		Fair	Gastronomy Fair
March 5, 2025	RK Zagreb vs. KS Kielce		Handball tournament	EHF Champions League
March 8, 2025	Neno Belan & Fiumens		Concert	Regata Života Tour
March 21, 2025	Lepa Brena		Concert	Imam pesmu da vam pevam Tour
March 22, 2025	Lepa Brena		Concert	Imam pesmu da vam pevam Tour
March 23, 2025	Lepa Brena		Concert	Imam pesmu da vam pevam Tour
March 28, 2025	Bijelo Dugme		Concert	Doživjeti stotu! Tour
March 29, 2025	Bijelo Dugme		Concert	Doživjeti stotu! Tour
March 30, 2025	Bijelo Dugme		Concert	Doživjeti stotu! Tour
May 10, 2025	Tea Tairović		Concert	Neka Gori Balkan Tour
October 25, 2025	Neda Ukraden		Concert	Zora Je Svanula Tour
November 7, 2025	Severina		Concert	Ja samo pjevam Tour
November 8, 2025	Severina		Concert	Ja samo pjevam Tour
November 14, 2025	2025 Judo Grand Prix Zagreb		Sport	November 14–16, 2025
November 19, 2025	RK Zagreb- SC Magdeburg		Sport	
November 21, 2025	Crvena Jabuka	12,000	Concert	
November 22, 2025	Mile Kitić		Concert	
November 26, 2025	Andre Rieu		Concert	
November 29, 2025	Parni Valjak		Concert	
December 3, 2025	RK Zagreb- Eurofarm Pelister		Sport	
December 5, 2025	Saša Matić		Concert	
December 6, 2025	Saša Matić		Concert	
December 10, 2025	Till Lindemann		Concert	
December 13, 2025	Tomislav Bralić & klapa Intrade		Concert	
December 16, 2025	URBAN & 4 i gudački kvartet		Concert	
December 21, 2025	Supertalent Final		Talent show	
December 23, 2025	STRAUSS Christmas Gala		Concert	
December 27, 2025	Marko Perković Thompson	18,600	Concert	Hodočasnik Tour
2026
January 8, 2026	Croatia – Germany		Handball	2026 European Men's Handball Championship
January 17, 2026	Masters Of Dirt 2026		Sport	Motor Show
January 24, 2026	Buč Kesidi		Concert	
January 30, 2026	Megadance Party		Concert	All hits concert
February 4, 2026	UWW Zagreb open GP 2026		Wrestling	February 4–8, 2026
February 14, 2026	Ana Bekuta	3,000	Concert	
February 18, 2026	RK Zagreb- PSG		Sport	
February 21, 2026	Peđa Jovanović		Concert	
February 26-28, 2026	GAST sajam 2026		Fair	February 26–28, 2026
March 4, 2026	RK Zagreb- Wisla Plock		Sport	
March 7, 2026	Sergej Ćetković		Concert	
March 12, 2026	Chris Norman		Concert	
March 14, 2026	Hari Mata Hari		Concert	
March 20, 2026	K-Pop Forever!		Tribute concert	
March 21, 2026	K-Pop Forever!		Tribute concert	
March 25, 2026	Lord of the Dance		Other	
March 28, 2026	Toma Zdravković		Tribue concert	
April 11, 2026	Drito iz Arene		Concert	
April 28, 2026	Eros Ramazzotti		Concert	
May 8, 2026	Jala Brat & Buba Corelli		Concert	Goat Tour 2
May 9, 2026	Jala Brat & Buba Corelli		Concert	Goat Tour 2
May 16, 2026	Progledaj Srcem		Concert	
May 23, 2026	Tanja Savić		Concert	
May 30, 2026	Tony Cetinski		Concert	
June 3, 2026	Gabriel “Fluffy” Iglesias		Other	
June 17, 2026	Sting		Concert	3.0 Tour
June 19, 2026	Jakov Jozinović		Concert	
June 20, 2026	Jakov Jozinović		Concert	
July 16, 2026	Marilyn Manson		Concert	One Assassination Under God Tour
August 13-23, 2026	37th European Men's Artistic Gymnastics Championships		Sport (Gymnastics)	European Championship

- Mark Knopfler had a concert promoting his album Privateering (5 May 2013)
- Iron Maiden held a full house concert as a part of their Maiden England World Tour (31 July 2013)
- We Will Rock You took place, performing in total of 3 shows (25–26 May 2013)
- Céline Dion was supposed to hold a concert on 16 March 2024, with her upcoming Courage World Tour but canceled due to her health problems.

== Gallery ==
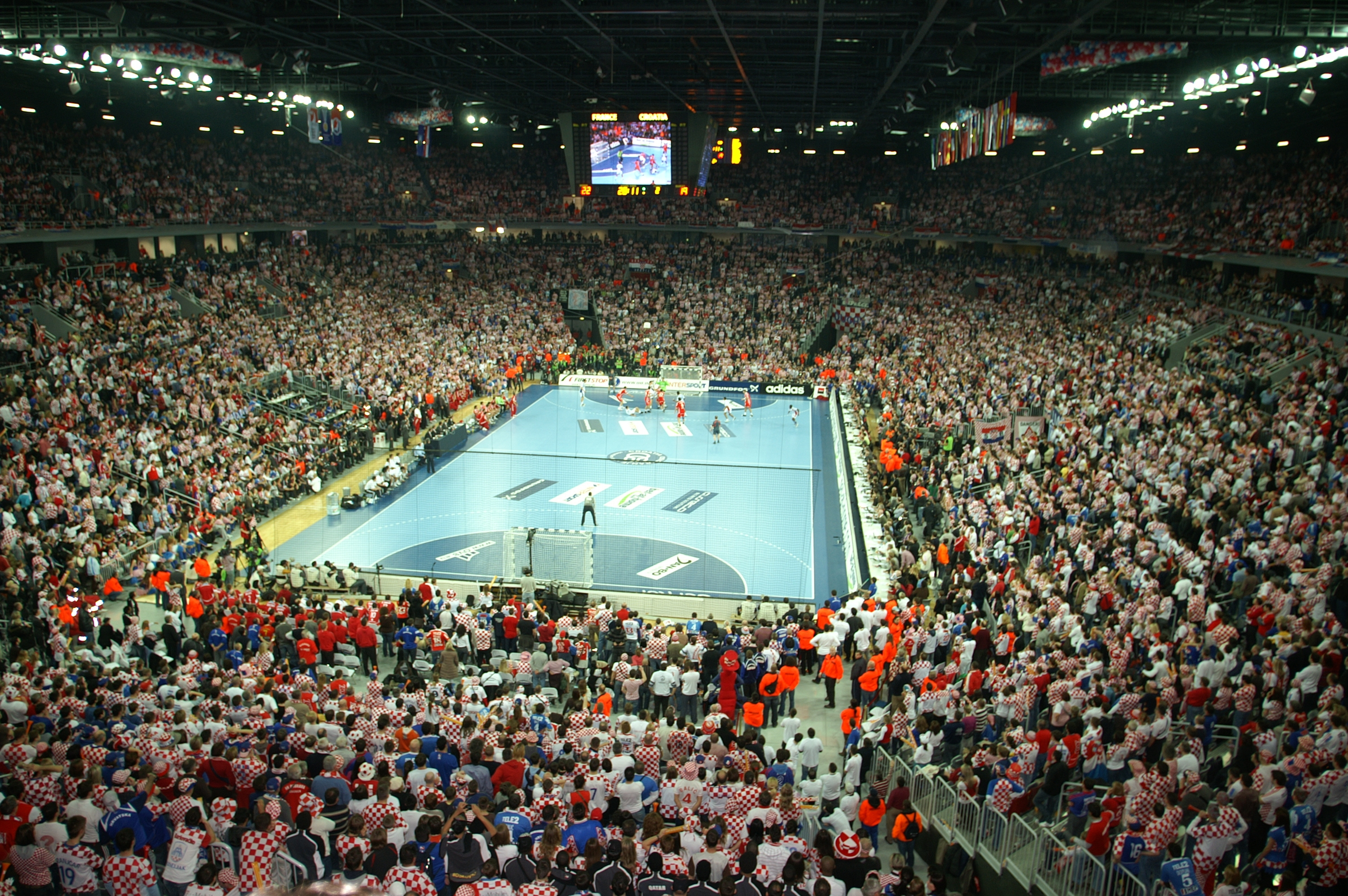
2009 World Men's Handball Championship

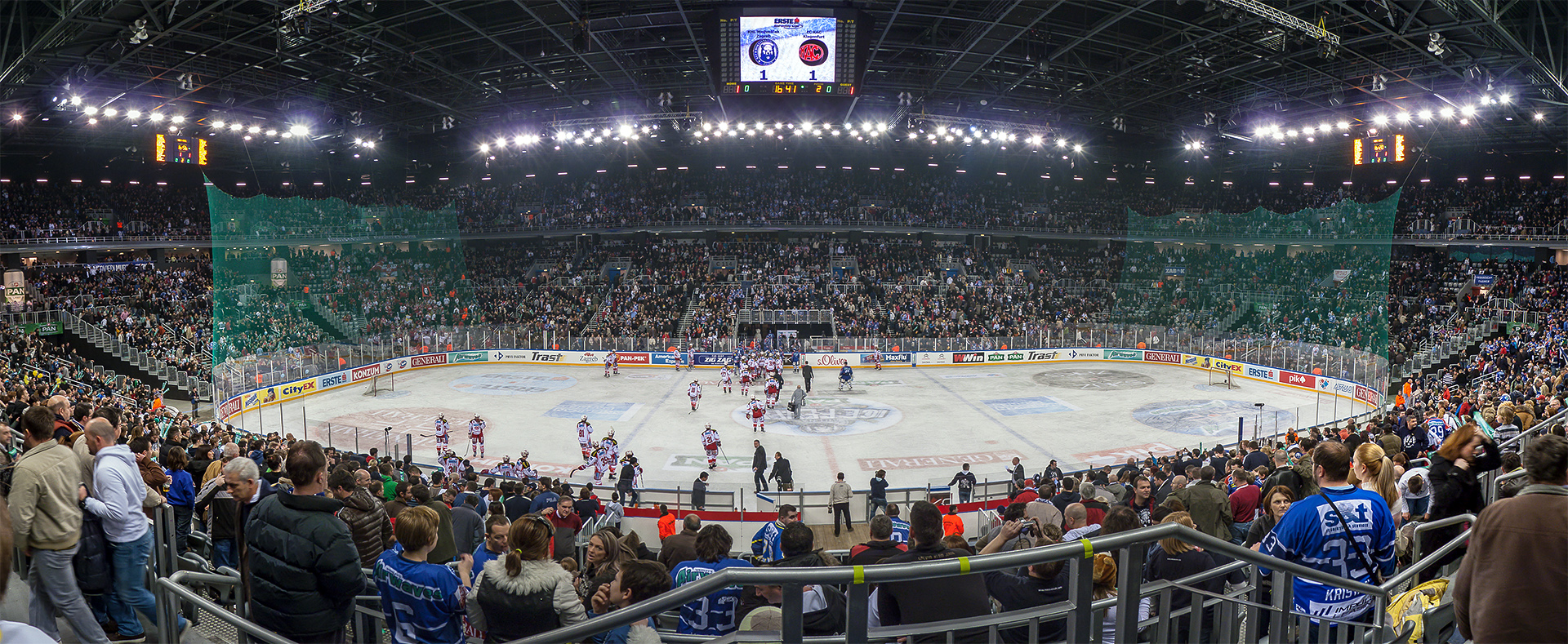
KHL Medveščak Zagreb game

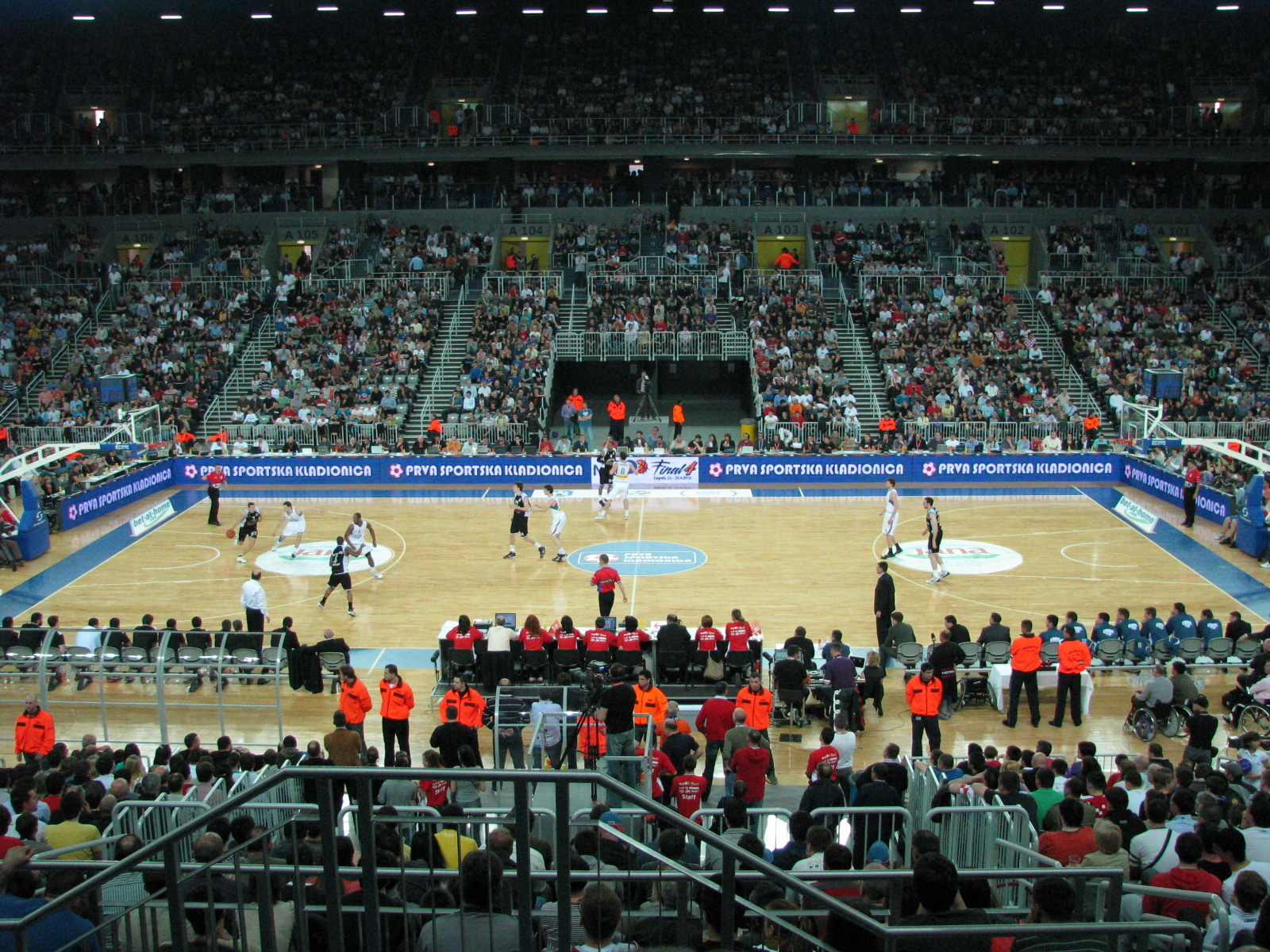
Cibona vs Partizan, April 2010

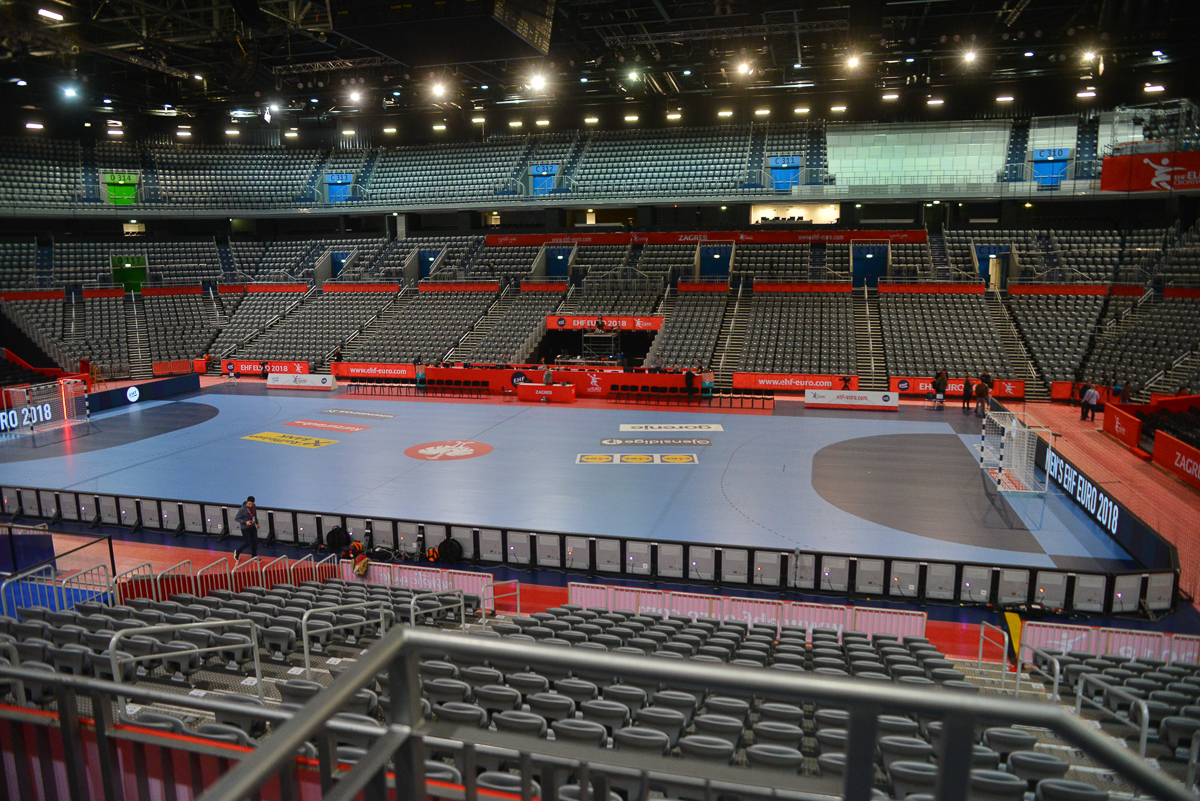
2018 European Men's Handball Championship

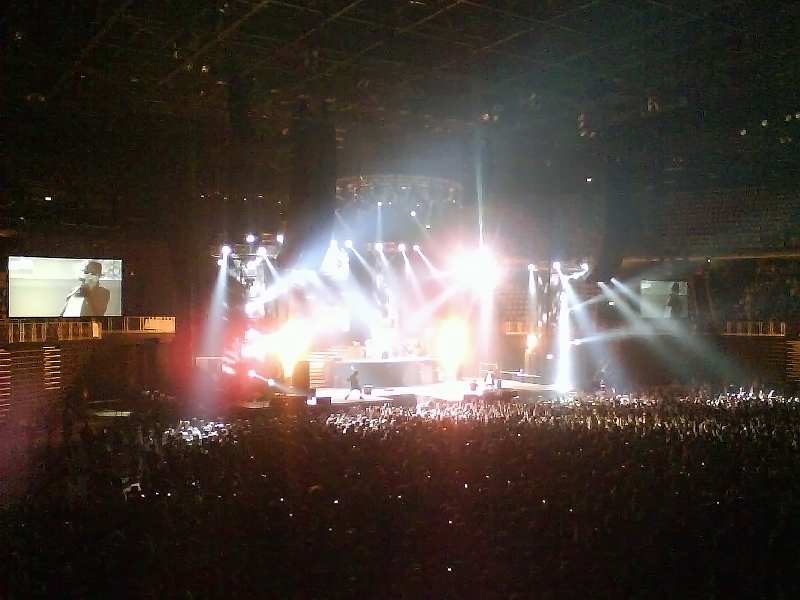
Guns N’ Roses concert in Arena Zagreb, 2010

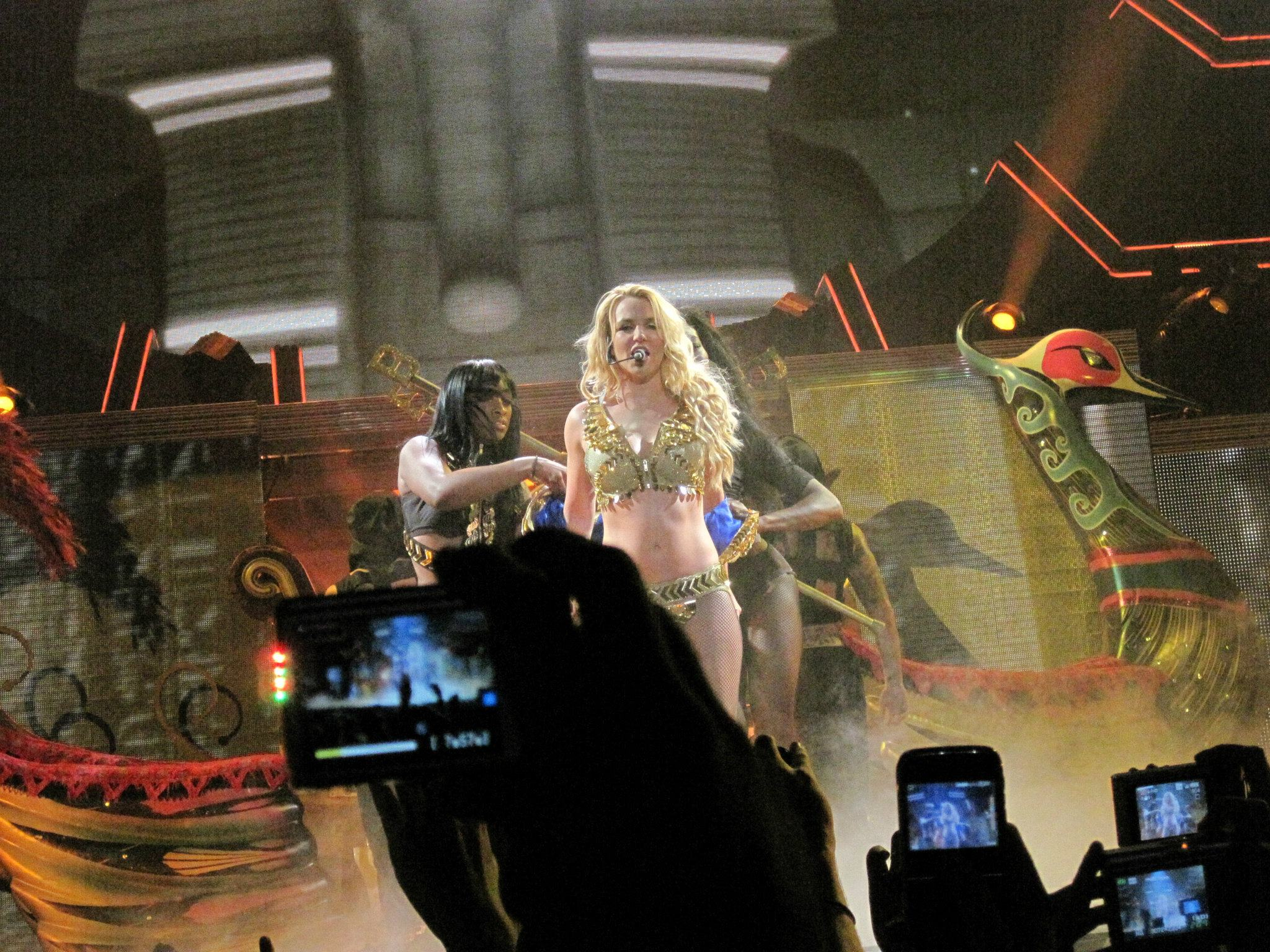
Britney Spears with her Femme Fatale Tour, 2011

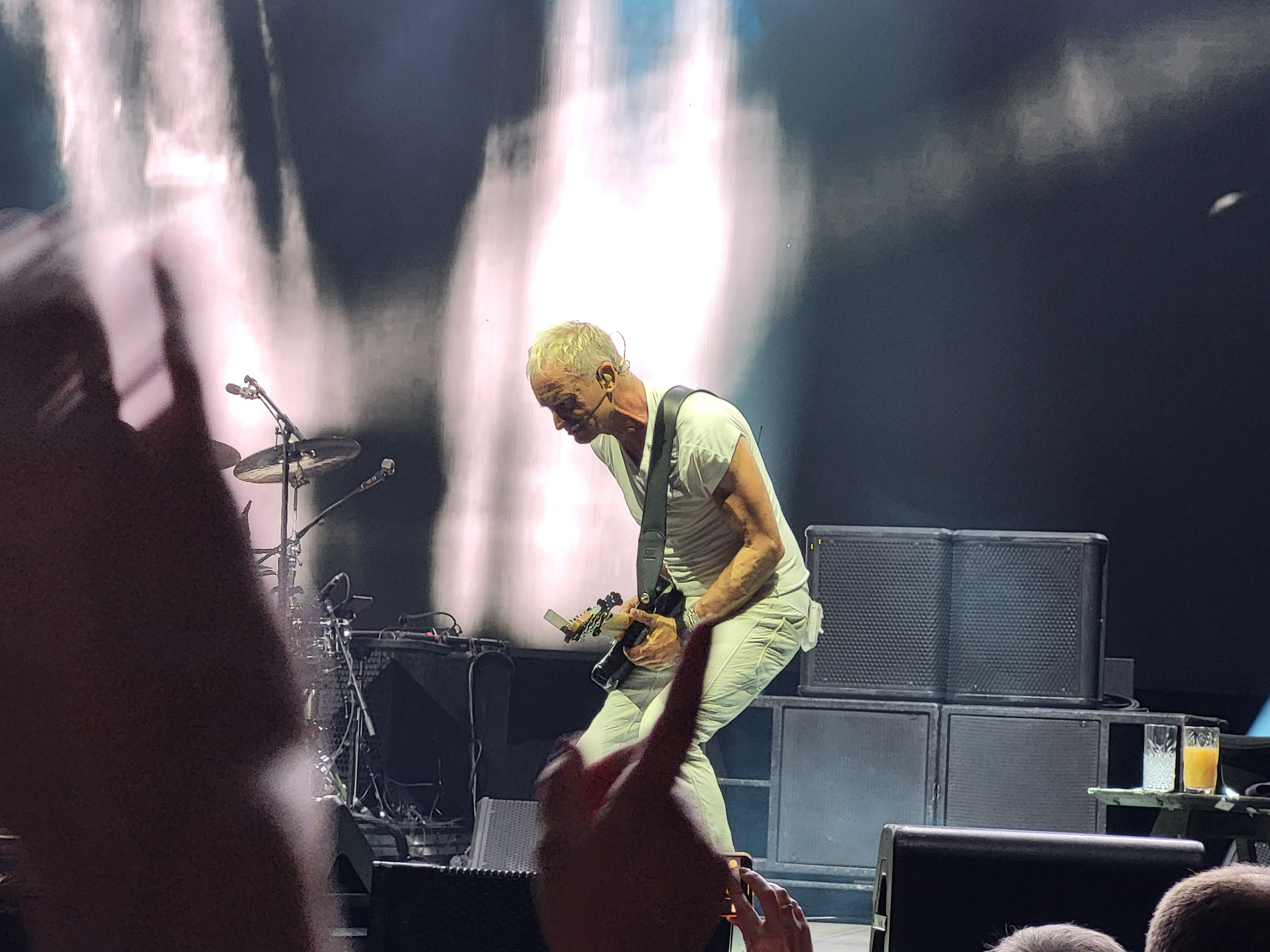
Sting, 2022

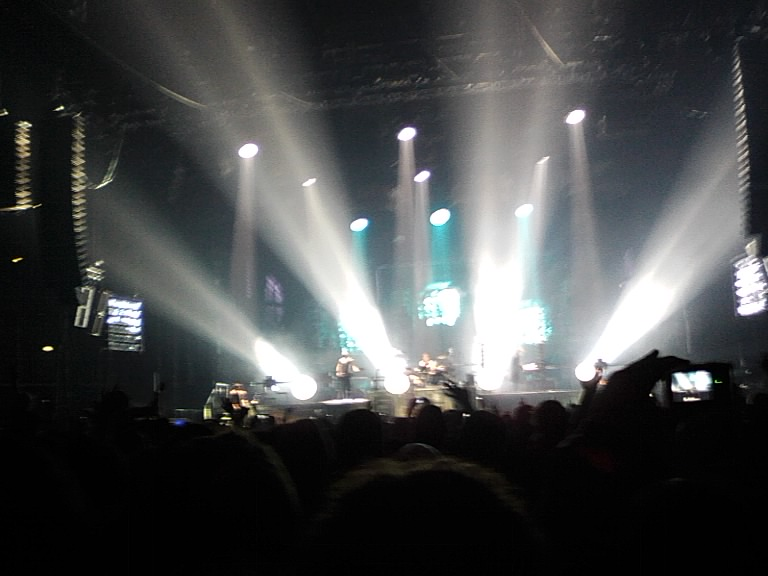
Rammstein, 2011

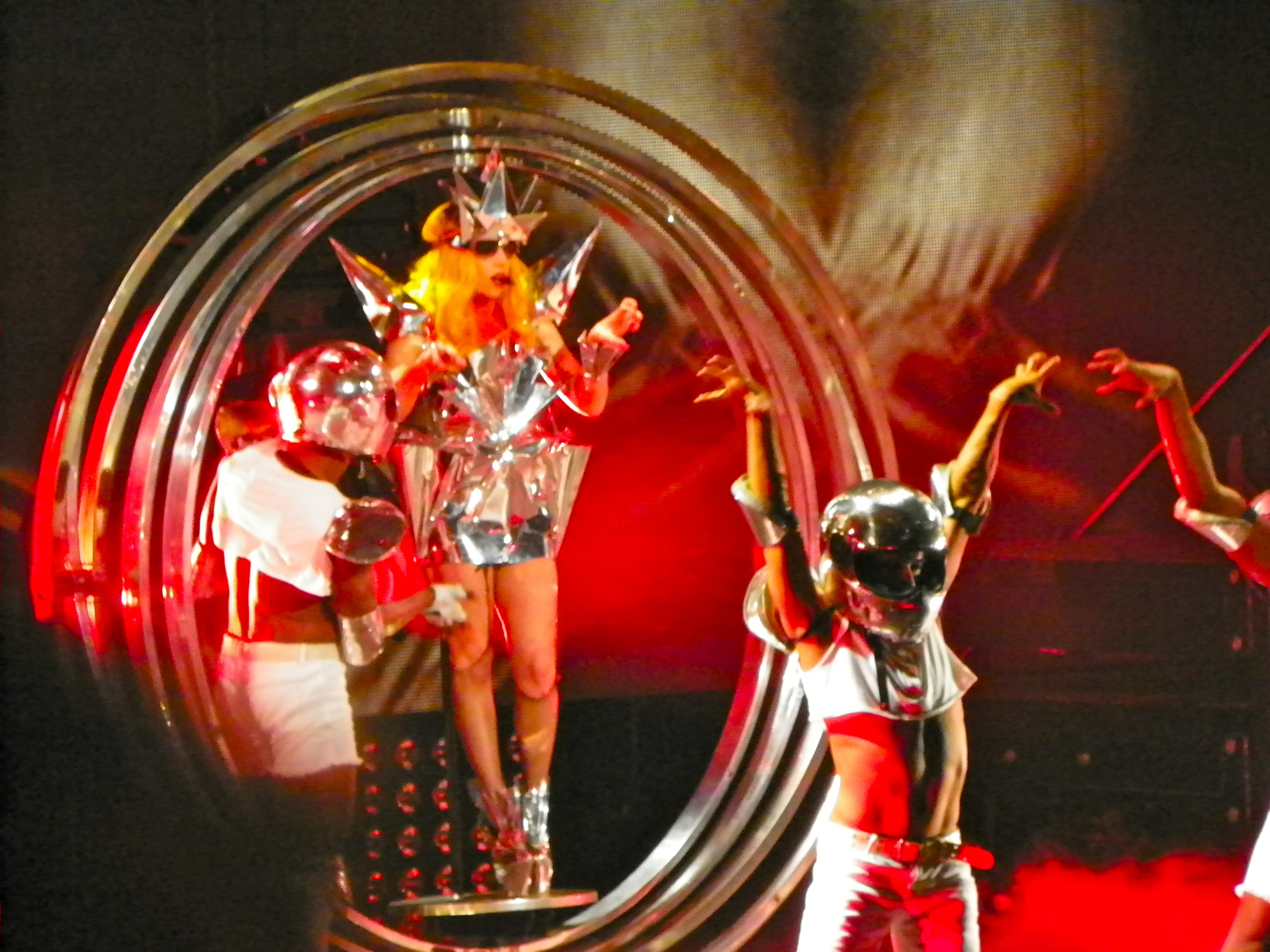
Lady Gaga on Monster Ball Tour, 2010

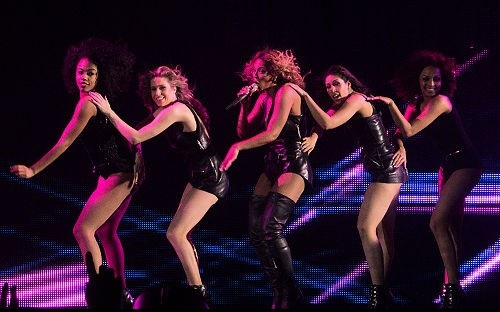
Beyoncé on Mrs. Carter World Tour, 2013

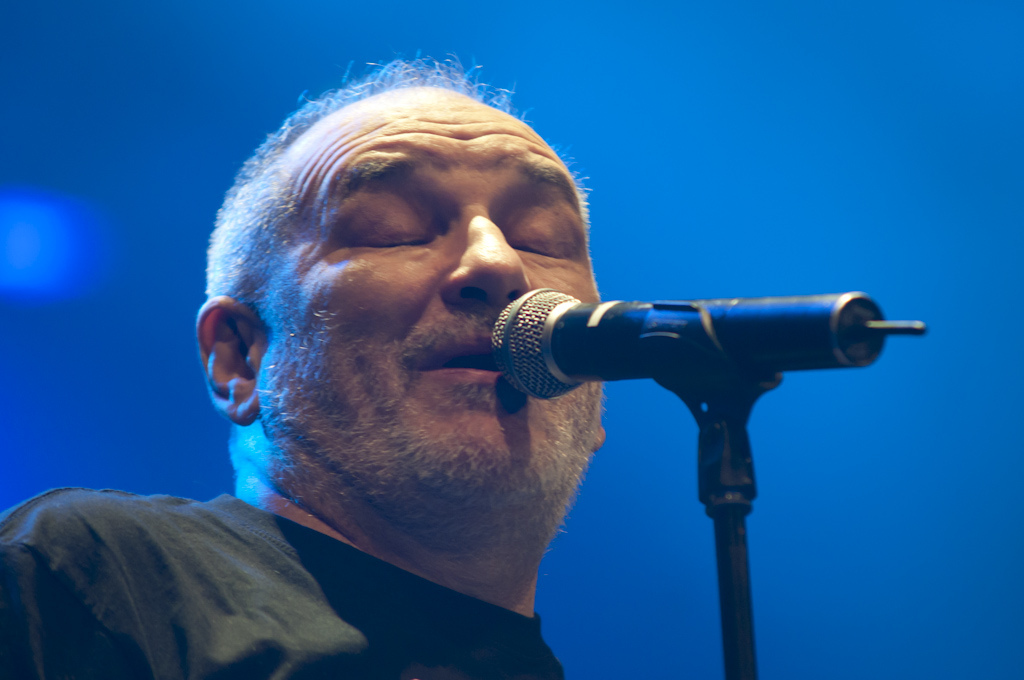
Đorđe Balašević in Arena Zagreb, 2010

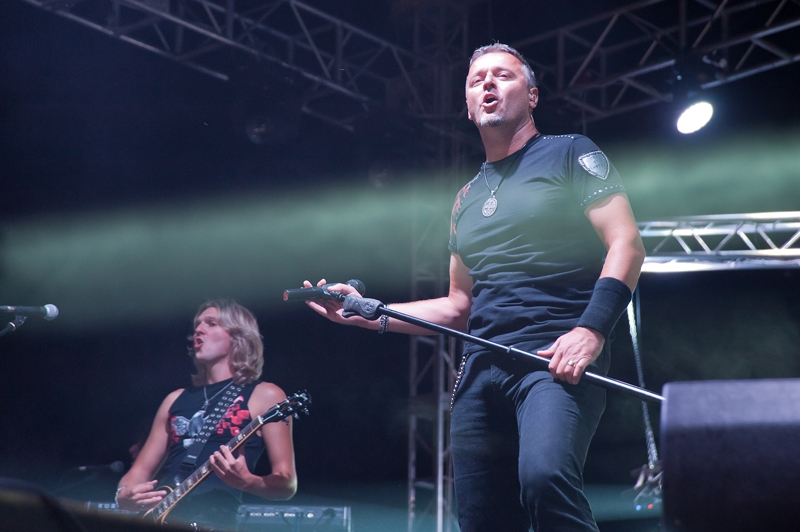
Marko Perković Thompson, 2014

== See also ==
- List of indoor arenas in Croatia
- List of European ice hockey arenas
- List of indoor arenas by capacity

Events and tenants
Preceded by Lanxess Arena; Cologne	World Men's Handball Championship; Final Venue; 2009	Succeeded by Malmö Arena; Malmö
Preceded by Főnix Hall; Debrecen	UEFA Futsal Championship; Final Venue; 2012	Succeeded by Sportpaleis; Antwerp
Preceded by Kombank Arena; Belgrade	European Women's Handball Championship; Final Venue; 2014	Succeeded by Scandinavium; Gothenburg
Preceded by Flanders Expo; Ghent	Davis Cup; Final Venue; 2016	Succeeded by Stade Pierre-Mauroy; Lille
Preceded by Kraków Arena; Kraków	European Men's Handball Championship; Final Venue; 2018	Succeeded by Tele2 Arena; Stockholm
