= Ingra =

Ingra may refer to:

- Ingra (construction company)
- Ingra, a character in The First (comics)
- Ingra, a name of an underground artist Ingra Miler
