= Privateering (album) =

Studio album by Mark Knopfler
- Released: 3 September 2012; 10 September 2012 (North America)
- Recorded: 4 March – 7 December 2011
- Studios: British Grove Studios, Chiswick, West London
- Genres: Blues rock, roots rock, Celtic rock, folk rock
- Length: 89:56
- Labels: Mercury; Verve (US)
- Producer: Mark Knopfler

Mark Knopfler chronology
Get Lucky (2009)	Privateering (2012)	Tracker (2015)

Privateering is the seventh solo studio album by British singer-songwriter and guitarist Mark Knopfler, released on 3 September 2012 by Mercury Records. The first studio double-album of Knopfler's 35-year career as a recording artist, Privateering consists of 20 original songs (plus four more released in other editions), and integrates blues rock with traditional folk and country genres. Recorded between March and December 2011, the album received generally positive reviews throughout Europe, and reached the number one position on album charts in Austria, Germany, Norway and the Netherlands, as well as the number two or three position in Belgium, Italy, New Zealand, Poland, Spain, Sweden and Switzerland. The album peaked at number eight in the United Kingdom. The album was released in North America a full year after its European release due to a contractual dispute between Knopfler and his North American distributors.

== Background ==
Privateering was Knopfler's first album in three years. In January 2011, Knopfler produced the album The Sailor's Revenge for Bap Kennedy at British Grove Studios in London. Knopfler built the award-winning studio in 2005 and recorded Kill to Get Crimson (2007) and Get Lucky (2009) at the state-of-the-art facility. For the Bap Kennedy project, Knopfler enlisted the help of several top session players, including Jerry Douglas, Glenn Worf, John McCusker and Michael McGoldrick. They were joined by James Walbourne, Ian Thomas and Guy Fletcher. By March 2011, Knopfler and Guy Fletcher returned to British Grove to begin work on Knopfler's next album.

== Recording ==
Privateering was recorded at Studio 2 at British Grove Studios in London between 4 March and 7 December 2011, with additional backing vocals, drum overdubs and strings recorded in February 2012. On 4 March 2011, Knopfler and Fletcher began pre-production on the new album. For the next three months, as Knopfler ran through the new songs, the two discussed possible arrangements and the best instruments to support each song. Knopfler tested numerous guitars from his collection in search of the right sound for each song. Fletcher later wrote, "Each and every one of the guitars to hand has different characteristics and can lend itself to a particular song. The trouble is, there's no way of knowing this unless you try them all, so part of our routine when we set up for a recording is to find which guitar will work best 'for the song'."

By late May 2011, Knopfler and Fletcher were joined in the studio by Glenn Worf (bass), Richard Bennett (guitars, bouzouki, and tiple), and Jim Cox (piano, organ), as well as Ian Thomas (drums) who had played on the Bap Kennedy sessions earlier in the year. In early June, this core group was joined by folk musicians John McCusker (fiddle, cittern), Michael McGoldrick (whistles, uilleann pipes), and Phil Cunningham (accordion), with Paul Franklin (pedal steel guitar) joining later in the month. The recording process Knopfler and Fletcher chose for this album involved pre-tracking the songs with the core lineup and later bringing in the folk musicians to overdub their parts. For some tracks, the core group recorded their basic tracks over preliminary tracks that Knopfler and Fletcher worked out.

Recording continued throughout the summer of 2011. In September, work on the album was suspended while Knopfler and his band prepared for a European tour with Bob Dylan that lasted from 6 October to 20 November. On 21 November, the band returned to British Grove Studios for two weeks to complete the recording of Privateering. Knopfler and his band were joined by two additional guest musicians, Tim O'Brien (mandolin) and Kim Wilson (harp). The final recording session was on 7 December 2011.

Knopfler, Fletcher and Ainlay spent much of January and February 2012 mixing the tracks for Privateering in Studio 2 at British Grove. The mixing to master process involved three analog two-track Ampex ATR-100 tape machines, fitted with one-inch, half-inch and quarter-inch head blocks. They also mastered digitally via Prism and Apogee interfaces in Pro Tools at 96k and 192k and in Nuendo at 96k. The team would then listen back to all the formats and decide which was best for the song. Fletcher later wrote, "The results are rarely what we expect with both digital and analog gaining preference although the analog tends to win most of the time."

In February, Ruth Moody from the Wailin' Jennys was invited to sing some backing vocals, and Ian Thomas came in to rerecord his drum part for one of the songs. Composer Rupert Gregson-Williams was then brought in to supervise and conduct the strings. Knopfler and Gregson-Williams decided on an unusual string section that included eight celli, six violas and six violins. Final mastering of the album was done by Bob Ludwig at Gateway Mastering Studios in Portland, Maine.

== Release ==
Privateering was released on 3 September 2012 in the United Kingdom and Canada in several formats. There are several different versions:

- The Standard International version contains 20 tracks, packaged as a two-disc CD set, or as a two-LP set, or as a digital download.
- An additional track "Your Perfect Song" was available only as a bonus with the digital download of the album.
- The Deluxe Edition version contains 25 tracks. The standard 20 tracks are included over two CDs; there is also a 5-track bonus CD of live concert rehearsal recordings from autumn 2011. This edition also contains a special booklet and packaging.
- The Deluxe Download Edition contains exactly the same collection of 25 tracks as the Deluxe Edition, but with no booklet.
- The Super Deluxe Edition boxset version includes 23 studio tracks. The "Standard International" 20 tracks are included on two CDs, as well as being repeated on an enclosed two-LP set. There's also an exclusive bonus CD of three extra studio tracks and a card with a code to download a full concert. The boxset also includes a documentary DVD, A Life in Songs, and a numbered art print. The Super Deluxe Edition Boxset does not include the five-track bonus CD of live concert rehearsal recordings that's part of the Deluxe Edition version.

Privateering was not initially released in the United States due to a "contractual dispute" between Knopfler and his longtime U.S. record company, Warner Bros. Records. The dispute was acknowledged on Knopfler's website on 14 September 2012. On 9 July 2013, Knopfler announced that he'd signed a new distribution deal with Universal Music Group. Privateering was finally released in North America on Verve Records on 10 September 2013.

== Artwork ==
The photograph used for the album cover was taken by Johnnie Pilkington, and shows a battered van amidst old tires and wheel rims beneath a bleak sky, with a small dog walking away from the van. The photograph is an HDR type image. In the album's title, Knopfler used the idea of a "privateer"—a privately owned ship or its captain authorized by a government during wartime to capture enemy vessels—as an analogy for modern rock-and-roll musicians who make their way in the world in a spirit of independence and adventure.

I really get a buzz out of having this little group of people that sallies forth across the world. I enjoy being in command of it, the band, the crew, travelling through this ever-changing landscape and playing in all these different places. You get where you get without any kind of assistance, really, making your own way in the world. There are no government grants to play this music. You're a privateer. And that's the way I like it.

Knopfler recalled the early days of his music career, when "if you had a van you could get into a group, so band wagons have always had a special place in my heart."

The back cover appears to show a section of the van's rear brake light and bumper with a weathered sticker bearing the letters "GB" (Great Britain). The insert includes song lyrics and album credits, and includes additional photographs by Guy Fletcher showing details of several guitars, a Bösendorfer piano, a microphone and a recording console.

== Touring ==
Privateering was supported initially by Knopfler's North American concert tour with Bob Dylan, which started on 5 October 2012 in Winnipeg, Manitoba, and included 33 concerts in 31 cities, ending in Brooklyn, New York, on 21 November 2012. The concerts typically consisted of Knopfler and his band performing an 11-song opening set, followed by Dylan and his band performing a 14-song set, with Knopfler accompanying Dylan on guitar for the first four songs. Knopfler's tour lineup included Mark Knopfler (guitar, vocals), Richard Bennett (guitar), Guy Fletcher (keyboards), Jim Cox (piano, organ, accordion), Michael McGoldrick (whistles, uilleann pipes), John McCusker (violin, cittern), Glenn Worf (bass) and Ian Thomas (drums). Setlists from this tour included a number of songs from Privateering, such as "Redbud Tree," "Haul Away," "Privateering," "Miss You Blues," "Corned Beef City," "Yon Two Crows" and "I Used to Could."

Knopfler's official Privateering Tour of Europe started on 25 April 2013 in Bucharest, Romania and included 70 concerts in 63 cities, ending on 31 July 2013 in Calella de Palafrugell, Spain. The tour included a six-night run at the Royal Albert Hall in London.

== Critical reception ==
Professional ratings
Aggregate scores
Source	Rating
Metacritic	77/100
Review scores
Source	Rating
AllMusic	4/5 stars
Daily Express	4/5 stars
The Telegraph	4/5 stars
Financial Times	4/5 stars
The Gazette	4/5 stars
musicOMH	4/5 stars
Rolling Stone	3.5/5 stars
Slant Magazine	4/5 stars

In his review in The Gazette, Bernard Perusse gave the album four out of five stars, noting its continuity with Knopfler's previous solo efforts in its mix of "gentle folk rockers with moody portraits painted by acoustic guitars and whistles." Some of the new songs, according to Perusse, "rank up there with the finest in his catalogue." One element that distinguishes Privateering from its predecessors is its "economical use of trademark electric guitar fills and a frequent leaning on blues structures," with more than half of the songs presented in the blues genre.

In his review in the Daily Express, Simon Gage gave the album four out of five stars, calling it "lyrically sound and musically flawless." According to Gage, Knopfler is still going strong after 35 years of recording and that there's "nothing here that won't delight Knopfler fans."

His voice is sounding more like Leonard Cohen than ever and while the melancholy flavour we expect of this all-time great is still very much in evidence, there are forays out into classic blues and bluesy rock, both of which suit him down to the ground.

In her review in The Telegraph, Helen Brown gave the album four out of five stars, calling it "a warm, authentic and durable record: the musical equivalent of a well-worn plaid shirt." According to Brown, this seventh Knopfler solo album is "a backwoods ramble through two discs of the rootsy Anglo-American sounds in which Knopfler is now (mostly) so comfortable. There's old-timers' country, roadhouse blues, a Tom Waitsian piano ballad and yearning Celtic pipe." Brown notes that one of Knopfler's strengths is to write melodramatic folk lyrics then deliver them "like he's leaning against a petrol pump."

In his review for AllMusic, James Christopher Monger gave the album four out of five stars, calling it Knopfler's "most ambitious and pugnacious set to date." Monger continued:

Upon first spin, Privateering feels a little like a garage sale, offering up long cold plates of once warm, late-night porch jams that feel like pre-studio session warm-ups, but the album's stately, yet schizophrenic nature, which pits lo-fi, studious, yet ultimately forgettable exercises in rote American blues like "Hot or What" and "Gator Blood" with amiable, highway-ready rockers ("Corned Beef City") and incredibly affecting, spooky folk-pop ballads like "Redbud Tree," "Kingdom of Gold," and the magnificent "Dream of the Drowned Submariner," all three of which owe a couple of polite high fives to Dire Straits songs like "The Man's Too Strong" and "Brothers in Arms," reveals an artist in complete control of his arsenal.

In her review in the Financial Times Ludovic Hunter-Tilney gave the album four out of five stars, calling it a "fine set of songs about masculine struggle and salvation." The songs are populated with a "Knopflerian cast of working-class characters—sailors, farmers, van drivers—and set to a variety of moods: Celtic folk-rock, gnarly blues, gruff rock and roll." Brown concluded, "Superb backing from Scottish folk musicians and Nashville session men gives these blue-collar tales an expert craftsman’s finish."

In his review for Rolling Stone, Will Hermes gave the album three and a half out of five stars.

Knopfler's sueded voice has changed little since his 1980s heyday, and his elegant electric-guitar work sounds better than ever. The 20 songs, most top-shelf, are a textbook of folk styles, from Irish ballads ("Kingdom of Gold") and country-flavored weepers ("Seattle") to slide-driven blues ("Don't Forget Your Hat") and Tin Pan Alley nostalgia ("Radio City Serenade"). On the title track, he shows off his acoustic playing, a folk-rock vet returning to the source.

In his review for musicOMH, Andy Baber gave the album four out of five stars, praising Knopfler's ability to deliver "material of such high quality" with production that captures "the sound of Americana". Baber concluded:

Knopfler's seventh studio album delivers two discs of songs that will take you back to when everything sounded less artificial. Privateering is arguably Knopfler's strongest solo effort and one which shows off his ability as a guitarist, a vocalist and a songwriter. It's a testament to his talent that he can pull off a double album with so few weaknesses and from this evidence, Knopfler has many more miles left in the tank.

On the review aggregator website, Metacritic, Privateering holds a Metascore of 77, meaning the album has received "generally favorable reviews".

== Track listing ==
All songs were written by Mark Knopfler except where indicated.

Disc one

No.	Title	Length
1.	"Redbud Tree"	3:19
2.	"Haul Away"	4:01
3.	"Don't Forget Your Hat"	5:15
4.	"Privateering"	6:19
5.	"Miss You Blues" (traditional melody, lyrics by Knopfler)	4:18
6.	"Corned Beef City"	3:32
7.	"Go, Love"	4:52
8.	"Hot or What"	4:54
9.	"Yon Two Crows"	4:26
10.	"Seattle"	4:17

Disc two

No.	Title	Length
1.	"Kingdom of Gold"	5:22
2.	"Got to Have Something"	4:01
3.	"Radio City Serenade"	5:13
4.	"I Used to Could"	3:36
5.	"Gator Blood"	4:15
6.	"Bluebird"	3:27
7.	"Dream of the Drowned Submariner"	4:57
8.	"Blood and Water"	5:19
9.	"Today Is Okay"	4:45
10.	"After the Beanstalk"	3:54
Total length:		89:56

Deluxe edition bonus disc - "Live from rehearsals"
From Sarm Music Bank, London, 2011

No.	Title	Length
1.	"Why Aye Man"	7:12
2.	"Cleaning My Gun"	4:43
3.	"Corned Beef City"	4:26
4.	"Sailing to Philadelphia"	7:12
5.	"Hill Farmer's Blues"	5:18
Total length:		28:51

Super deluxe edition bonus disc

No.	Title	Length
1.	"Occupation Blues"	4:22
2.	"River of Grog"	3:42
3.	"Follow the Ribbon"	8:07
Total length:		16:11

An additional track "Your Perfect Song" was available only as a bonus with the digital download of the album.

== Personnel ==
- Mark Knopfler – vocals, electric guitar, slide guitar, acoustic guitar, string arrangements
- Richard Bennett – guitars, bouzouki, tiple
- Jim Cox – piano, Hammond organ
- Guy Fletcher – keyboards, vocals, string arrangements
- John McCusker – fiddle, cittern
- Michael McGoldrick – whistles, uilleann pipes
- Phil Cunningham – accordion
- Glenn Worf – bass guitar, string bass
- Ian Thomas – drums
- Kim Wilson – harmonica
- Tim O'Brien – mandolin, vocals
- Paul Franklin – pedal steel guitar
- Ruth Moody – vocals
- Rupert Gregson-Williams – vocals, string conductor
- Chris Botti – trumpet
- Nigel Hitchcock – saxophone
- John Charnec – clarinet

Production

- Mark Knopfler – producer, design
- Guy Fletcher – co-producer, engineer, photography
- Chuck Ainlay – co-producer, engineer
- Bob Ludwig – mastering, Gateway Mastering Studios, Portland, Maine
- Johnnie Pilkington – cover photography
- Big Fish – cover design
- Salvador Design – design

== Charts ==
=== Albums ===
Chart (2012)	Peak
Australia Albums Chart	25
Austria Albums Chart	1
Belgium Albums Chart (Vl)	2
Belgium Albums Chart (Wa)	3
Canadian Albums Chart	23
Czech Albums Chart	5
Dutch Albums Chart	1
Finland Albums Chart	7
France Albums Chart	10
Germany Albums Chart	1
Hungary Albums Chart	7
Ireland Albums Chart	25
Italy Albums Chart	2
New Zealand Albums Chart	3
Norway Albums Chart	1
Poland Albums Chart	2
Portugal Albums Chart	12
Spain Albums Chart	2
Sweden Albums Chart	2
Swiss Albums Chart	2
Turkey Albums Chart	2
UK Albums Chart	8

=== Year-end charts ===
Chart (2012)	Position
Belgian Albums Chart (Flanders)	76
Belgian Albums Chart (Wallonia)	95
Dutch Albums Chart	28
Italy Albums Chart	77
Poland Albums Chart	8
Swiss Albums Chart	93

== Certifications ==
Region	Certification	Certified units/sales
Germany (BVMI)	Gold	100,000^{^}
Italy (FIMI)	Gold	25,000^{*}
United Kingdom (BPI)	Silver	60,000^{‡}
^{*} Sales figures based on certification alone.^{^} Shipments figures based on certification alone.^{‡} Sales+streaming figures based on certification alone.
