= Energy Orchard (album) =

Studio album by Energy Orchard
- Released: 1990
- Studios: Ridge Farm Studios, Capel, Surrey; The Town House, London; Eden Studios, Chiswick, London
- Genres: Rock, Celtic
- Label: MCA
- Producer: Mick Glossop

Energy Orchard chronology
Energy Orchard (1990)	Stop the Machine (1992)

Energy Orchard is the debut album by Northern Ireland-based rock band Energy Orchard, released in 1990.

== Critical reception ==
Professional ratings
Review scores
Source	Rating
AllMusic	2/5 stars

The Boston Globe deemed the album "a gem, filled with U2's spiritual optimism and a smart, diverse sound that pays homage to U2, Dire Straits, Bob Dylan, John Cougar Mellencamp and early rhythm 'n' blues rockers such as the Yardbirds and Animals."

== Track listing ==
All tracks composed by Bap Kennedy, except where noted.

1. "Belfast" (Joby Fox) – 4:56
2. "Somebody's Brother" – 6:42
3. "Lion" – 4:48
4. "One, Two Brown Eyes" (Van Morrison) – 3:53
5. "King of Love" – 4:11
6. "Sailortown" – 4:10
7. "Walk In Love" – 3:02
8. "This House Must Fall" – 3:47
9. "Sweet Irish Rose" – 3:52
10. "Hard Street" – 4:56
11. "Good Day to Die" – 4:15
12. "Belfast" - Instrumental (Joby Fox) – 1:52

== Personnel ==
Energy Orchard

- Bap Kennedy - lead vocals, 12-string and rhythm guitars, lead guitar on "One, Two Brown Eyes", harmonica
- Paul Toner - lead guitar, backing vocals
- Spade McQuade - rhythm guitar, backing vocals
- Joby Fox - bass, backing vocals; acoustic guitar on "Belfast"
- Kevin Breslin - keyboards; bodhrán on "Somebody's Brother"
- David Toner - drums, percussion

Technical

- Clare Muller - front cover photography
