= Energy Orchard =

- Origin: Belfast,
- Genres: Irish folk music, folk rock, punk, new wave
- Years active: 1980s–1997
- Members: Bap Kennedy (lead vocals); Paul Toner (lead guitar); David Toner (percussion); Spade McQuade (rhythm guitar/mandolin/vocals); Joby Fox (bass guitar); Kevin Breslin (keyboards)

Energy Orchard were a guitar-based rock band of the late 1980s and early 1990s, from Belfast, Northern Ireland. Fronted by Bap Kennedy (brother of singer-songwriter Brian Kennedy), their style drew heavily on the influence of Van Morrison and other rhythm and blues acts, but incorporated traditional elements of Irish folk music. The band emerged from the remnants of one other Belfast-based punk/new wave band, 10 Past 7.

== Career ==
Following the band's early concerts at the New Pegasus they were signed to MCA on the recommendation of Steve Earle.

The band consisted of:

- Bap Kennedy (lead vocals)
- Paul Toner (lead guitar)
- David Toner (percussion)
- Spade McQuade (rhythm guitar/mandolin/vocals)
- Joby Fox (bass guitar)
- Kevin Breslin (keyboards)

Whilst the majority of the songs were written by Kennedy, it was Fox that wrote their biggest hit, "Belfast". But following personal problems Fox left to be replaced for a short time initially by Michael Kelpie and then Steve Lawrence. Following another re-jig McQuade switched to bass, in what would become the final line-up until the band parted in 1997.

Their debut single, "Belfast" was their most successful song, and reached 52 in the UK Singles Chart, and featured on EastEnders. The 1990 follow-up was "Sailortown". The first album, Energy Orchard, was released to some critical appreciation. Subsequent albums included the 1992 release Stop the Machine, 1993's Shinola (released on Essential Records), Pain Killer (1995) and the 1996 live album, Orchardville.

Despite extensive touring, the breakthrough to mainstream success eluded them. The band having completed their recording contract with Castle Communications in 1996 disbanded. The split-up saw Kennedy go on to launch a successful solo career (his first album saw a renewed partnership with Steve Earle), whilst McQuade and Breslin relocated to Jacksonville, Florida. Whilst there they played together in local band Celtic Soul, prior to McQuade launching his own group Spade McQuade and the Allstars.

Both Paul and David Toner left the music industry with Paul reading Law at Queens University, Belfast, and David moving to Sweden to teach English for a time.

With Stan Lynch from Tom Petty and the Heartbreakers and Jim DeVito, Kevin Breslin formed Buffalo Diamond and recorded The Things You Do, released in November 2005.

== Discography ==
=== Singles ===
- "Belfast" (1990) – UK No. 52
- "Sailortown" (1990) – UK No. 73
- "King of Love" (1990) – UK No. 93
- "Somebody's Brother (live)" (1990) – UK No. 80

=== Albums ===
- Energy Orchard (1990) – UK No. 53
- Stop the Machine (1992)
- Shinola (1993)
- Pain Killer (1995)
- Orchardville (1996)
