= The Sailor's Revenge =

Studio album by Bap Kennedy
- Released: 30 January 2012
- Recorded: British Grove Studios
- Genre: Folk
- Length: 48:26
- Language: English
- Label: Proper Records
- Producer: Mark Knopfler

Bap Kennedy chronology
Howl On (2009)	The Sailor's Revenge (2012)

The Sailor's Revenge is the eighth solo album by Bap Kennedy. The album was produced by Mark Knopfler. All eleven songs were written by Bap Kennedy.

== Track listing ==
All tracks composed by Bap Kennedy

1. "Shimnavale" – 5:06
2. "Not a Day Goes By" – 4:05
3. "Jimmy Sanchez" – 4:38
4. "Lonely No More" – 3:06
5. "The Right Stuff" – 3:46
6. "Maybe I Will" – 4:33
7. "Please Return to Jesus" – 4:11
8. "Sailor's Revenge" – 4:53
9. "Working Man" – 4:30
10. "The Beauty of You" – 3:30
11. "Celtic Sea" – 6:09

== Reception ==
In his review in The Telegraph, Martin Chilton wrote:

On The Sailor's Revenge, the tracks are well written, the singing is good and the musicianship first class—unsurprising, since Jerry Douglas, James Walbourne, Guy Fletcher, Glenn Worf and John McCusker are among those playing. Special praise, too, for Michael McGoldrick, who is stunning on flutes, pipes and whistle. But it's Bap—the 50-year-old older brother of singer Brian Kennedy—who is the real star of the show. He's an adroit songwriter and he can cover soul, country and folk with ease. All 11 songs are of high quality—the standouts perhaps being "Jimmy Sanchez" and "The Sailor's Revenge"—and it's easy to see why Van the man rates Bap the Chap so highly.

== Deluxe edition ==
A deluxe two-CD edition was released 7 February 2012 and includes a bonus 11 track "best of" disc that features two previously unreleased tracks.

1. "Moonlight Kiss"
2. "Unforgiven"
3. "On the Mighty Ocean Alcohol"
4. "Milky Way"
5. "Loverman"
6. "The Way I Love Her"
7. "Howl On"
8. "The Sweet Smell of Success"
9. "Into the Arms of Love"
10. "Be True to Your Heart"
11. "Moriarty's Blues"
