= Domestic Blues =

Studio album by Bap Kennedy
- Released: May 19, 1998
- Studio: Room & Board Recording, Nashville, Tennessee
- Genre: Country / Blues
- Label: E-squared
- Producer: The Twangtrust (Steve Earle, Ray Kennedy)

Bap Kennedy chronology
Orchardville (with Energy Orchard) (1996)	Domestic Blues (1998)	Hillbilly Shakespeare (1999)

Professional ratings
Review scores
Source	Rating
Allmusic	4/5 stars
cluas.com	8/10 stars

Domestic Blues was the first solo album from Northern Ireland–based singer-songwriter, Bap Kennedy, and was released in 1998. The album was generally well-received, with allmusic calling it "an exceptionally intelligent recording" and Uncut saying that "[Domestic Blues is] a fine collection of songs" and reached number 8 in the billboard Americana chart

== Recording ==
The album was recorded in Nashville, TN. Kennedy had received a phone call from country music legend Steve Earle inviting him to come to Nashville and record an album, to be released on Earle's short-lived record label E-squared. The album was produced by Earle and Ray Kennedy, and featured several renowned session musicians, such as Peter Rowan and Jerry Douglas.

== Track listing ==
All tracks composed by Bap Kennedy; except where noted.

1. "Long Time a Comin'" – 2:38
2. "The Way I Love Her" – 3:30
3. "Unforgiven" – 3:37
4. "Domestic Blues" – 2:57
5. "I've Fallen in Love" – 3:21
6. "Vampire" – 2:36
7. "Angel Is the Devil" (Steve Earle) – 2:50
8. "The Backroom" – 3:20
9. "Mostly Water" – 3:20
10. "The Ghosts of Belfast" – 2:51
11. "My Money" – 3:15
12. "The Shankill and the Falls" – 2:46

== UK Special Edition version ==
The album was re-released in a "special edition" form in the UK in 2000. The special edition had a different album cover, featuring a photograph of Kennedy's mother as a child, and contained two extra tracks, "Lowlife" and "Dream of You". The latter included Kennedy playing the Ewan MacColl song "Dirty Old Town" as a hidden track.

== Personnel ==
Musicians

- Bap Kennedy – acoustic guitar and vocals on all tracks
- Roy Huskey, Jr. – upright bass on all tracks
- Peter Rowan – mandolin on all tracks except 2, 4, 5 and 14 backing vocals on tracks 1, 2, 5, 7, 10 and 11, mandola on track 2, classical guitar on tracks 3, 5 and 14
- Jerry Douglas – dobro on all tracks except 4, 10 and 13, lap steel on tracks 4, 10, 12 and 13
- Steve Earle – acoustic guitar on all tracks except 3, 8 and 10, High-string guitar on track 2, archtop guitar, on track 2, 12-string guitar on tracks 3, 8 and 10, backing vocals on tracks 4 and 6
- Larry Atamanuik – drums and percussion on all tracks except 4, 8, 9 and 12, Hammond organ on track 9
- Michael Smotherman – Hammond B-3 organ on track 3, drums on track 8
- Nancy Blake – cello on tracks 5 and 12, fiddle on track 7
- Ray Kennedy – backing vocals on track 5
- Nanci Griffith – backing vocals on tracks 2 10 and 12
- Keith Weir – piano on tracks 6, 7 and 11
- Dan Gillis – tin whistle on track 10
- Paul Guerin – lead guitar on tracks 13 and 14

Production

- Steve Earle – Music production and engineering
- Ray Kennedy – production, engineering and recording
- Patrick Earle – assistant engineering
- Hank Williams – mastering

(Please note that this Hank Williams is of no relation to the singer-songwriter Hank Williams)

- Alan Messer – Photography
