= The Big Picture (Bap Kennedy album) =

Studio album by Bap Kennedy
- Released: August 2, 2005
- Recorded: Somerset, England
- Genre: Country, Folk rock
- Length: 37:12
- Language: English
- Label: Loose Records

Bap Kennedy chronology
Long Time a Comin': The Story So Far (2002)	The Big Picture (2005)	Howl On (2009)

Professional ratings
Review scores
Source	Rating
Claus	8/10 stars

The Big Picture is the sixth solo studio album by Bap Kennedy, released on August 2, 2005 on Loose Records. It is a mix of country, Americana and Celtic soul with guest vocals by Shane MacGowan and also features a song co-written with Van Morrison. On "Moriarty's Blues", Carolyn Cassady recites from her book, Off the Road.

In a review by Mojo it was given four out of five stars.

== Track listing ==
All songs and music by Bap Kennedy, except where noted.

1. "Rock and Roll Heaven" – 2:46
2. "The Truth is Painful" – 4:00
3. "Moriarty's Blues" – 3:15
4. "Streetwise" – 3:28
5. "Too Old for Fairy Tales" – 4:43
6. "Milky Way" – (Van Morrison, Bap Kennedy) - 3:49
7. "Loverman" – 3:16
8. "Fireworks" – 3:06
9. "On the Mighty Ocean Alcohol" (vocals by Shane MacGowan) – 3:22
10. "The Sweet Smell of Success" – 3:09
11. "The Beautiful Country" -3:17

== Personnel ==
- Bap Kennedy - lead vocals, acoustic and electric guitar
- Ed Deane - acoustic, electric and lap steel guitar
- James Walbourne - guitar, mandolin
- Carwyn Ellis, Rory McFarlane - bass
- BJ Cole - pedal steel guitar
- Kieran Kiely - piano, accordion, low whistle, organ
- Johnny Mac, Martin Hughes - drums
- Michele Drees - drums, percussion
- Damian Hand - tenor and alto saxophone
- Dave Priseman - trumpet, horn
- Jake Walker - violin, viola
- Alison Limerick, Carlton Webster, Vera Haime - backing vocals
