= Stop the Machine =

Studio album by Energy Orchard
- Released: 1992
- Genre: Rock / Celtic
- Label: MCA
- Producer: Glyn Johns

Energy Orchard chronology
Energy Orchard (1990)	Stop the Machine (1992)	Shinola (1993)

Stop the Machine was the second album from Northern Ireland-based rock band, Energy Orchard, and was released in 1992. The album was dedicated to "the memory of Rosemary Breslin."

== Track listing ==
1. "(When I'm With You I'm) All Alone" - 2:59
2. "It's All Over Now, Baby Blue" - (Bob Dylan) - 3:56
3. "How the West Was Won" - 2:48
4. "My Cheating Heart" - 4:27
5. "Pain, Heartbreak and Redemption" - 4:54
6. "Slieveban Drive" - 4:33
7. "Blue Eyed Boy" - 3:51
8. "Stop the Machine" - 3:34
9. "Tell Your Mother" - 2:54
10. "Three Days on the Tear" - 3:34
11. "All Your Jewels" - 5:26
12. "Little Paleface" - 4:35

== Personnel ==
Energy Orchard

- Bap Kennedy - vocals, guitar, harmonica
- Paul Toner - lead guitar, backing vocals
- Spade McQuade - rhythm guitar, mandolin, backing vocals
- Steve Lawrence - bass
- Kevin Breslin - keyboards
- David Toner - drums

with:

- Barry Beckett - piano on "It's All Over Now, Baby Blue"
- Frankie Finneran - whistle on "Slieveban Drive"

Technology

- Jack Joseph Puig - engineer
