= Bap Kennedy =

Northern Irish singer, songwriter and guitarist

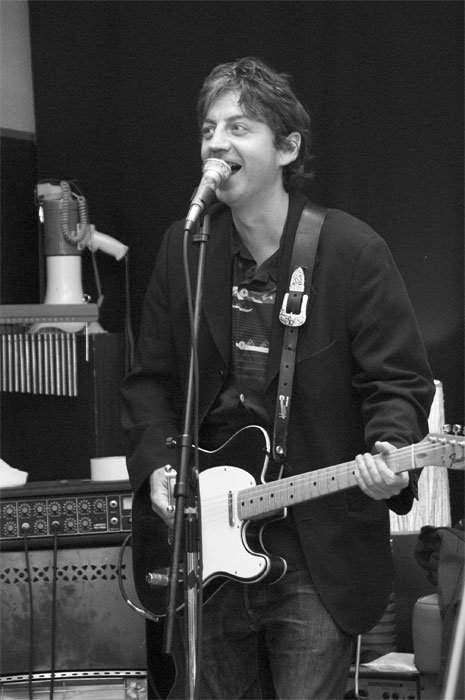
- Kennedy in 2009

Background information
- Born: Martin Christopher Kennedy; 17 June 1962; Belfast, Northern Ireland
- Died: 1 November 2016 (aged 54) Belfast, Northern Ireland
- Genres: Rock; country; americana; blues; folk; soul
- Occupation: Singer-songwriter
- Instruments: Vocals, guitar, harmonica
- Years active: 1978–2016
- Labels: Lonely Street Discs; Proper Records; Loose Music
- Formerly of: Energy Orchard; Van Morrison; Steve Earle; Mark Knopfler
- Website: Bap Kennedy official website

Martin Christopher Kennedy (17 June 1962 – 1 November 2016), known as Bap Kennedy, was a singer-songwriter from Belfast, Northern Ireland. He was noted for his collaborations with Steve Earle, Van Morrison, Shane MacGowan and Mark Knopfler, as well as for writing the song "Moonlight Kiss" which was on the soundtrack for the film Serendipity.

Kennedy was in the rock band Energy Orchard for many years and also recorded a number of well-received solo albums including Domestic Blues, The Big Picture, The Sailor's Revenge, Let's Start Again and Reckless Heart. During his solo career, Kennedy performed, wrote and recorded songs with artists such as Steve Earle (on Domestic Blues), Van Morrison (on The Big Picture) and Mark Knopfler (on The Sailor's Revenge). Following the releases of The Big Picture and The Sailor's Revenge, he toured the US and Europe with Mark Knopfler of Dire Straits, who also produced Kennedy's 2012 album The Sailor's Revenge.

== Musical career ==
=== Early musical career and 10 Past 7 (1978–87) ===
Kennedy's first band was the punk band Sellout formed in 1978 at age 16. The band was formed to support rock group Uncle Waldo, playing in a local Belfast club.

In 1980 after having played in several other local bands, Kennedy formed the band 10 past 7, with whom he received his first national recognition when they appeared on Channel 4 music show The Tube in 1983. The band was managed by Mark Kelly, MBE. 10 Past 7 were signed to the Good Vibrations record label by Terri Hooley – who had discovered The Undertones several years earlier – and they released two singles before disbanding when Bap left Belfast for London to pursue a recording contract.

=== Energy Orchard (1987–96) ===
In 1987, after moving to London, Kennedy formed the band Energy Orchard, for whom he was the rhythm guitarist, lead singer and primary songwriter. Although the band was based in London, all of its members had originally come from Belfast like Kennedy. MCA Records gave the band a major record deal in 1988 and they would go on to release two albums with the label, before signing with Transatlantic for a further two studio albums as well as the live album Orchardville.

Energy Orchard went on to establish themselves as regulars on the live scene in London, including a performance at the first London Fleadh in 1990. The band also toured extensively throughout the UK, Europe and America, including several support slots with Van Morrison, Steve Earle and Jimmy Barnes. Energy Orchard disbanded in 1996 with a farewell London gig on St Patrick's Day which would be recorded for the live album Orchardville.

== Solo career ==
=== Domestic Blues and Steve Earle (1998–2000) ===
After Energy Orchard split up, Kennedy received a phone call from Steve Earle, who offered to produce Kennedy's first solo record. Shortly afterwards, Kennedy joined him in Nashville, Tennessee, and recorded his first solo album.

Domestic Blues, which was released in 1998, was produced by the "Twang Trust" of Earle and Ray Kennedy, and Earle played guitar and sang backing vocals on the record. The album also features slide guitar player Jerry Douglas, guitarist Peter Rowan and singer Nanci Griffith amongst its session musicians.

All the songs on Domestic Blues were written by Kennedy except Angel is the Devil which was written by Earle. Earle was later to describe Kennedy as "the best songwriter I ever saw". The album was released on Earle's record label E-Squared and received generally favorable reviews. It was also a commercial success, charting at number eight on the Billboard 200.

Several songs from the album were used for movie soundtracks, including Vampire appearing in the soundtrack for the Oscar nominated film You Can Count on Me, which also won the Grand Jury Prize at the Sundance Film Festival. Three other songs from Domestic Blues were also used in the film Southie.

In 2012, the album's title track was used as the theme song for BBC Radio 4 comedy Happy Tuesdays. After the release of Domestic Blues, Kennedy toured with Steve Earle alongside other artists on the E-Squared label, including Cheri Knight and The V-Roys.

While he was in Nashville, Kennedy developed a keen interest in the music of Hank Williams, whom Kennedy described as his "favourite song writer" and a major influence. After he had finished recording Domestic Blues, Kennedy recorded an album of Hank Williams covers entitled Hillbilly Shakespeare, which featured pedal steel guitar playing from B.J. Cole. The album had a very limited release as the first record on Kennedy's own label, Lonely Street Discs.

=== Lonely Street, Serendipity and Moonlight Kiss (2000–05) ===
After returning to the UK, Kennedy briefly managed an Elvis impersonator named The King, and was the producer for The King's album Gravelands – a collection of songs by other deceased artists performed in the style of Elvis Presley. The record became a firm favourite of John Peel and the Red Hot Chili Peppers. Kennedy's continued interest in the music of Hank Williams and Presley led to him writing Lonely Street, a concept album based on the lives of his two musical heroes.

The album, which was released in 2000 on Kennedy's Lonely Street Discs label, features bass guitar playing by Herbie Flowers, who is noted for playing the famous bass line on Lou Reed's hit song Walk on the Wild Side. It received generally positive reviews. Kennedy's ballad "Moonlight Kiss" from the album was later used in the soundtrack for hit Hollywood movie Serendipity (starring John Cusack and Kate Beckinsale).

Following the release of Lonely Street, Kennedy spent several years touring, including performances with Shane MacGowan of The Pogues and Pete Doherty of The Libertines, and at the respected Half Moon, Putney, which also regularly held the Rolling Stones.

=== The Big Picture, Van Morrison and Shane MacGowan (2005–09) ===
The Pogues' lead singer Shane MacGowan provided guest vocals on Kennedy's next album, The Big Picture, with MacGowan providing lead vocals on the last verse of Kennedy's song "On the Mighty Ocean Alcohol".

The late Carolyn Cassady, another guest vocalist on the album, was the basis of the character Camille in Jack Kerouac's book On the Road. At the end of Kennedy's song Moriarty's Blues, Cassady gave a reading from her own book Off the Road. "Moriarty's Blues" is a ballad about the On the Road character Dean Moriarty, which was based on Cassady's husband Neal.

The Big Picture was also a return to working with Van Morrison, who had supported Kennedy since his Energy Orchard days. The album was recorded at Morrison's studio and featured the song Milky Way which was co-written by Morrison and Kennedy. The musicians appearing on the album include pedal steel guitarist B.J. Cole and guitarist James Walbourne, who is a member of rock group The Pretenders. The album was released in 2005 to generally positive reviews.

After the release of the album, Kennedy was approached by former Dire Straits frontman Mark Knopfler, who asked Kennedy to play as Knopfler's support artist. This led to Kennedy working as the support artist and special guest for Knopfler's tours of the US and Europe, including a five night stint at London's Royal Albert Hall.

=== Howl On and Glastonbury (2009–2012) ===
Kennedy's 2009 album Howl On was, like Lonely Street, a concept album based upon a real life subject which Kennedy was interested in. Howl On was a look back at the Space Race of the late 1960s, with Kennedy examining the lives and backgrounds of the astronauts and scientists who worked on the Apollo program.

The only cover on the album, Hey Joe was also chosen as a nod to this time period, as it had been the last song performed by Jimi Hendrix at the Woodstock Festival.

The song also features guest guitarist Henry McCullough, who was, as a member of Joe Cocker's band, the only Irishman to play at Woodstock. McCullough also worked with Paul McCartney and Wings.

Howl on received generally positive reviews. The album was followed by a successful tour of the UK, Europe and America, including the South by South West festival and a performance at the 2009 Glastonbury Festival.

=== The Sailor's Revenge and Mark Knopfler (2012–14) ===
Kennedy recorded a new album in early 2011, entitled The Sailor's Revenge, produced by former Dire Straits frontman Mark Knopfler at Knopfler's British Grove Studios in London. The album was a close collaboration between Kennedy and Knopfler, with the two artists having worked together on the project for 2 years. As well as producing the record, Knopfler had been heavily involved in choosing which songs to record for the album, and also played guitar on multiple songs and sang backing vocals for the song "Celtic Sea".

The album features several members of Knopfler's touring band, such as Glenn Worf, Guy Fletcher, John McCusker, Michael McGoldrick and Richard Bennett. Also playing on the album were session musician Jerry Douglas, who had previously worked with Kennedy on Domestic Blues, and James Walbourne of The Pretenders, who had played on Kennedy's 2005 album The Big Picture.

The Sailor's Revenge was released in 2012 on Proper Records and received widespread critical acclaim internationally including No 1 – Best of 2012 in influential American magazine No Depression where it was described as "truly a masterpiece from a man who is finally comfortable in his place in the world – The Celtic Blood on the Tracks". It was also listed by Mojo in the Top 10 Americana albums of 2012.

The album was supported by tours of the US, UK and Europe with Mark Knopfler.

=== Let's Start Again (2014–2016) ===
After the Celtic melancholy of The Sailor's Revenge, Kennedy moved to an upbeat Americana style for the follow-up Let's Start Again. The album, which Kennedy recorded in his native Northern Ireland, was produced by Mudd Wallace, who produced several albums for Northern Irish alternative rock band Therapy?. Wallace was a long-time friend of Kennedy and had worked as producer for Kennedy's early band 10 Past 7. Let's Start Again uses local Northern Irish session musicians, and features several musicians from Kennedy's live band, including his wife Brenda Kennedy, who plays bass guitar and sings backing vocals on the album.

The album had a full international release on CD and vinyl formats by Proper Records, and has received widespread critical acclaim including a 5 star review from No Depression.

=== Reckless Heart (2016) ===
Reckless Heart was Kennedy's final album completed during his lifetime, recorded in early 2016, only a few weeks before his diagnosis. Like Let's Start Again, Reckless Heart was recorded in Northern Ireland and used several musicians from Kennedy's live band, including his wife Brenda.

The album was released posthumously by Kennedy's label Lonely Street Discs, in conjunction with Last Chance Records in the US and by at the Helm in the UK and internationally. It has received widespread critical acclaim.

== Personal life ==
Martin Christopher Kennedy was born on 17 June 1962 to Lily and Jim Kennedy.

He was the brother of Brian Kennedy. The family grew up on the Falls Road, Belfast, in the 1970s, where he got his nickname of Bap, as a childhood reference to the rolls (or "baps") of bread sold by local firm Kennedy's Bakery.

Kennedy grew up in West Belfast at the height of the Troubles, and his close friend and 10 Past 7 manager Mark Kelly,MBE lost both legs in a no-warning bomb in Belfast in 1976.

Kennedy left Northern Ireland in 1985 and worked as a labourer on building sites in London prior to becoming a professional musician. While living in England, Kennedy became a qualified diamond gemmologist, accredited by the Gemmological Association of Great Britain.

In 2007, Kennedy moved back to his native Northern Ireland. Shortly after returning, Kennedy hosted a songwriting workshop, where he met author and former lawyer Brenda Boyd, who was participating in the workshop. The two soon became a couple, and they were married in 2008. Brenda, who has written several advice books for parents of children with autism and Asperger syndrome, has since sung backing vocals on four of Kennedy's albums – Howl On, The Sailor's Revenge, Let's Start Again and Reckless Heart – and was also a regular member of Kennedy's live band, as his bass guitarist and backing singer.

Through his marriage to Brenda, Kennedy was also stepfather to Christine White and Kenneth Hall, who is also an author, having written about his experience as a child with Asperger syndrome in Asperger Syndrome, the Universe and Everything. As a result of his family's links with autism and Asperger syndrome, Kennedy became co-patron (with his wife) of the charity Autism NI in 2010. Kennedy later revealed on his blog that he too had been diagnosed with Asperger syndrome, which he credited as being "the engine of [his] creativity". Outside of music, Kennedy had a keen interest in the Apollo space program, which would be the inspiration for Kennedy's 2009 album Howl On.

== Cancer battle ==
In May 2016, Kennedy started a blog on his personal website, detailing his progress after a sudden cancer diagnosis. He died on 1 November 2016 in Belfast in hospice care from pancreatic and bowel cancer. He had been receiving palliative care at Belfast's Marie Curie clinic.

== Discography ==
=== Recorded with Energy Orchard ===
- Energy Orchard (1990)
- Stop the Machine (1992)
- Shinola (1993)
- Pain Killer (1995)
- Orchardville (1996)

=== Solo releases ===
- Domestic Blues (1998)
- Hillbilly Shakespeare (1999)
- Lonely Street (2000)
- Rare Live & Bladdered (2000)
- Long Time a Comin': The Story So Far (2002)
- Moriarty's Blues (Standard Edition EP and Special Edition EP) (2005)
- The Big Picture (2005)
- Howl On (July 2009)
- The Sailor's Revenge (2012)
- Let's Start Again (2014)
- Reckless Heart (2016)
- Above All, Love (2026)
