= Tomislav Bralić =

- Born: Tomislav Bralić; 10 December 1968 (age 57); Bibinje, SR Croatia, Yugoslavia
- Origin: Zadar, Croatia
- Genres: Klapa
- Occupation: Singer
- Years active: 1985–present
- Labels: Scardona

Tomislav Bralić (born 10 December 1968) is a Croatian singer of klapa music. He is part of and de facto frontman of klapa group Klapa Intrade from Zadar, Croatia.

== Discography ==
- Lipa rič (1996)
- Dalmacijo lipa (2003)
- Karta ljubavi (2006)
- Ne damo te pismo naša (2009)
