= Howl On =

Studio album by Bap Kennedy
- Released: August 3, 2009
- Genre: Country rock
- Language: English
- Label: Lonely Street Discs
- Producer: Bap Kennedy

Bap Kennedy chronology
The Big Picture (2005)	Howl On (2009)

Howl On the fourth solo studio album by Bap Kennedy, was released on August 3, 2009 (see 2009 in music) on Kennedy's new label, Lonely Street Discs. Excluding a cover of "Hey Joe", all songs on the album were written by Kennedy. This is the first album he has written and recorded in his native Northern Ireland. This album features songs that were inspired by Kennedy's childhood memories of growing up with the influence of the popular American music rock icons Elvis Presley and Jimi Hendrix and the country music of Hank Williams. The songs also relate to 1960s American political figures: John F. Kennedy and to events: the 1969 Moon landing and with Kennedy's childhood obsession with the American Dream. Although the worldwide release was August 3, 2009, the album was released in Northern Ireland on July 4, 2009, with Kennedy's appearance at the Black Box in Belfast.

Henry McCullough, the only Irishman to play at the Woodstock Festival, plays guitar on Kennedy's rendition of the Hendrix classic, "Hey Joe".

Kennedy's wife, singer-songwriter Brenda Kennedy, performs as backing vocalist on the album.

== Songs ==
Kennedy's inspiration for most of the songs on the album came forty years ago when the American astronauts on Apollo 11 landed on the Moon on July 20, 1969, when Kennedy was a seven-year-old boy living in Belfast. A month later, Jimi Hendrix's appearance as the final act at the Woodstock Festival with a performance of "Hey Joe" served as further inspiration.

The opening song on the album, "America", reflects on Kennedy's childhood memories dreaming of all things American and when cowboys and the astronauts of the Apollo 11 spacecraft were his heroes. The Skinny comments that "Album opener America is a sentimental look across the ocean with a slow and smooth acoustic-driven beat with laid back vocals that unsurprisingly declare, ‘All I want to do/Is to be like you’.

"Cold War Country Blues" namechecks more of Kennedy's boyhood heroes, Hank Williams, Elvis Presley, John F. Kennedy and Apollo 8 astronaut Jim Lovell. Critic Nic Oliver calls the song, "pure Hank Williams honky-tonk, all toe-tapping melody and acoustic guitar".

The song "Brave Captain" is dedicated to the Apollo 8 crew and on "The Heart of Universal Love", Kennedy imagines the Earth as seen from the view of an astronaut standing on the Moon and looking up at the illuminated planet in the darkness of space.

"The Ballad of Neil Armstrong" celebrates Apollo 11's mission commander Neil Armstrong and the song "Irish Moon" is Kennedy's ode to another of the three astronauts, Michael Collins, who piloted the spacecraft as the other two astronauts landed on the Moon.

"The Blue One" is named for the Earth's image as seen on a photo taken by Voyager 1.

== Promotion ==
A video of "Hey Joe" is a feature on YouTube videos at Kennedy's Official Films: Link on YouTube. This song was previously best known as the debut single by The Jimi Hendrix Experience in 1966. Kennedy's 2009 cover was reviewed and given a four and one-half star rating by Leeds Music Scene with the reviewer commenting on Kennedy's cover: "While some of the lead guitar parts are very 'Hendrix-esque' the overall feel of the song is lot more uplifting than it's [sic] well known predecessor.

Kennedy performed on the Acoustic Stage at the Glastonbury Festival on June 27, 2009, featuring songs from the album, with the official launching in Northern Ireland on July 4, 2009, with Bap Kennedy and his band's appearance at the Black Box in Belfast.

Kennedy appeared on the Today with Derek Davis radio show on July 26, 2009, on RTÉ Radio 1.

As a promotion before the album's release, Kennedy's website offered a free download of the title track, "Howl On".

== Critical response ==
Professional ratings
Review scores
Source	Rating
Daily Mirror	link
The Guardian	link
Hot Press	link
The Irish Times	link
Leeds Music Scene	link
Mojo	link
Music-News	link
MusicOMH	link
The Observer	n/r – favourable link
RockSnail	n/r – favourable link

Howl On has been well received by music critics with mostly favourable reviews. MusicOMH calls the album "another object lesson in economic songwriting and solid musicianship." Hot Press rated it four stars and summarizes the album: "Howl On is a lovingly-crafted set of tunes – one giant leap for a talented Belfast man." The List also rated it four stars and refers to the album as "his best so far".

== Track listing ==
All songs and music by Bap Kennedy, except where noted.

1. "America" – 3:05
2. "Cold War Country Blues" – 2:22
3. "The Right Stuff" – 3:47
4. "Irish Moon" – 2:57
5. "The Blue One" – 2:23
6. "Hey Joe" – (Billy Roberts) – 4:44
7. "Howl On" – 4:09
8. "One of Those Days" – 3:20
9. "Brave Captain" – 2:41
10. "The Heart of Universal Love" – 3:27
11. "Last Adventure" – 2:29
12. "Ballad of Neil Armstrong" – 2:35

== Personnel ==
=== Musicians ===
- Bap Kennedy – guitar, vocal
- Brenda Kennedy – backing vocals on all tracks except: "America" and "Ballad of Neil Armstrong"
- Pete O'Hanlon – acoustic guitar, electric, rhythm guitar, bass, drums, percussion, backing vocals
- Henry McCullough – lead, rhythm guitar on "Hey Joe"
- Percy Robinson – pedal steel

=== Production ===
- Produced by Bap Kennedy
- Engineered, mixed and mastered by Pete O'Hanlon

=== Cover photo ===
- Ken Haddock (taken in Nashville, Tennessee 2009)
