= Pain Killer (Energy Orchard album) =

Studio album by Energy Orchard
- Released: 1995
- Studio: Greenhouse Studios, London N1
- Genre: Rock / Celtic
- Label: Castle Music
- Producer: Energy Orchard

Energy Orchard chronology
| Shinola (1993) | Pain Killer (1995) | Orchardville - Live (1996) |

Pain Killer was the fourth album from Northern Ireland-based rock band, Energy Orchard, and was released in 1995.

== Track listing ==
All tracks composed by Bap Kennedy; except where noted.

1. "Wasted" - 4:48
2. "She's the One I Adore" (Bap Kennedy, Paul Toner) - 4:06
3. "Remember My Name" - 4:41
4. "The Past Is Another Country" (Bap Kennedy, Kevin Breslin) - 5:38
5. "I Hate to Say Goodbye" (Bap Kennedy, Kevin Breslin) - 6:55
6. "Pain Killer" - 4:29
7. "D.F. Dogs" - Instrumental) - (Bap Kennedy, Spade McQuade) - 4:21
8. "The Shipyard Song" - 3:53
9. "Surrender to the City" - 4:50
10. "A Sight for Sore Eyes"
