= Ingra (construction company) =

INGRA d.d.
- Type: Public
- Traded as: ZSE: INGR
- ISIN: HRINGRRA0001
- Industry: Construction and civil engineering
- Founded: February 18, 1955
- Headquarters: Zagreb, Croatia
- Key people: Igor Oppenheim {chairman of the board}; Davor Štern {chairman of the supervisory board)
- Revenue: ▼252.3 million HRK (2010)
- Operating income: ▼90.5 million HRK (2010)
- Net income: ▼90.6 million HRK (2010)
- Number of employees: 123 (31 Dec 2010)
- Website: www.ingra.hr

INGRA d.d. is a Croatian construction company. Founded in 1955, INGRA has carried out work in more than 30 countries on more than 100 power supply facilities such as hydroelectric power plants, dams and pumping stations, and more than 700 projects such as factories, hotels, tourist complexes, hospitals, bridges and roads.

INGRA has operated as a joint stock company since 1990. As well as the investment construction which it has carried out since its founding, it has expanded its activities to include the construction of residential buildings, tourism – especially nautical tourism, road construction, and ancillary activities.

INGRA is based in Zagreb, Croatia, with offices in Algeria, Germany and Bosnia and Herzegovina. As of 2017, the company's Chairman of the Board is Igor Oppenheim.
