= Saša Antić =

Croatian recording artist

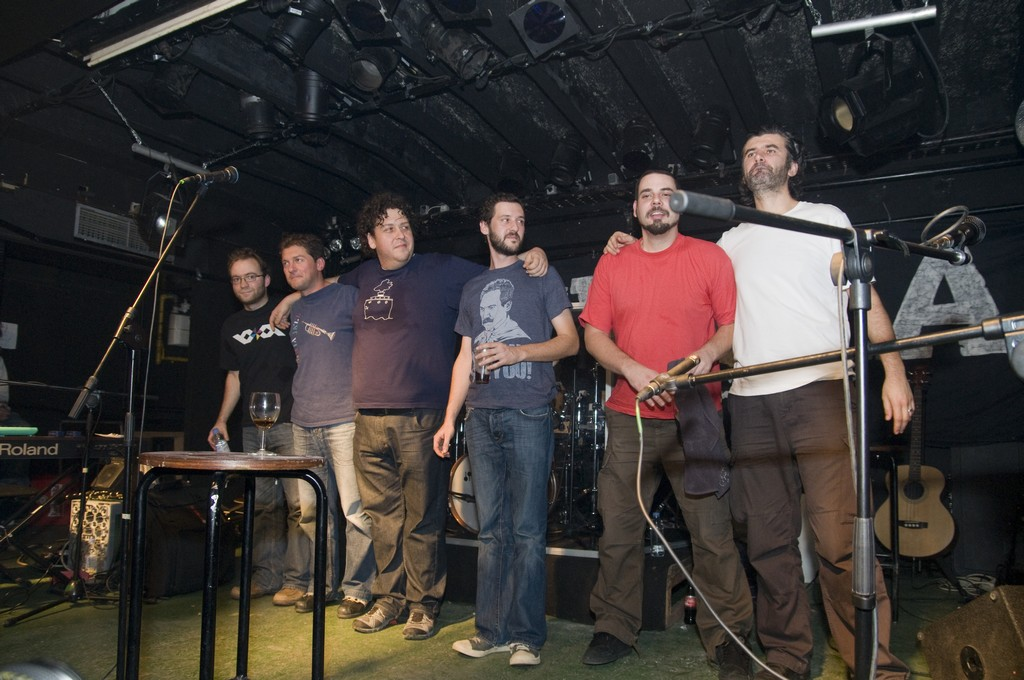
- Antić (far right) with The Beat Fleet in Zagreb, November 2009
- Born: Aleksandar Antić; 15 October 1973 (age 52); Split, Croatia
- Other name: Alejuandro Buendia
- Occupations: Rapper; record producer; record executive; singer; songwriter; actor; multi-instrumentalist
- Spouse: Ivana Antić
- Children: Igor; Marin
- Musical career
- Genres: Hip hop; rap rock
- Instrument: Vocals
- Member of: The Beat Fleet

Aleksandar "Saša" Antić (pronounced [aleksǎːndar sâʃa ǎːntitɕ]; born 15 October 1973), also known under his pseudonym Alejuandro Buendia, is a Croatian rapper, singer-songwriter and producer. He is widely known for his work as the founding member, primary lyricist and vocalist for the cult Split-based rap group The Beat Fleet, but also recorded successfully as a solo artist.

== Discography ==
Studio albums

- Pepermint (2007)
- Šporka posla (2012)
- Škrinja (2020)

Collaborative albums

- Hologram Funk (as part of Sinestet; 2008)

Compilation albums

- Featologija/1999–2008 Rifovano & Beatovano (2010)

== Awards and nominations ==
=== Porin Awards ===
Year	Award	Work	Result
2005	Song of the Year	"Nostalgična"	Won
2005	Best Rock Album	Maxon Universal	Won
2005	Best Production	Maxon Universal	Won
2005	Best Duo/Group Performance	Maxon Universal	Won
2005	Best Album Cover	Maxon Universal	Won
2008	Album of the Year	Galerija Tutnplok	Won
2008	Best Production	Galerija Tutnplok	Won
2008	Best Duo/Group Performance	"Smak svita"	Won
2008	Best Arranging	"Smak svita"	Won
2008	Best Music Video	"Smak svita"	Won
2010	Best Duo/Group Performance	"Shlapa"	Won
2010	Best Music Video	"Data"	Won
2011	Best Concert Album	Perpetuum Fritule	Won
2011	Best Album Cover	Perpetuum Fritule	Won
2011	Best Duo/Group Performance	"Fantastična"	Won
2012	Album of the Year	Pistaccio Metallic	Won
2012	Best Club Album	Pistaccio Metallic	Won
2012	Best Compilation Album	Nostalgično fantastično	Won
2013	Best Music Video	"Grad spava"	Won
2016	Best Club Album	Danas sutra	Won
