= Dino Dvornik =

Croatian musician

- Dvornik in 1989
- Born: Dino Miljenko Dvornik; 20 August 1964; Split, SR Croatia, SFR Yugoslavia
- Died: 7 September 2008 (aged 44); Zagreb, Croatia
- Occupations: Singer; songwriter; arranger; music producer; actor
- Years active: 1982–2008
- Television: Dvornikovi
- Spouse: Danijela Kuljiš (m. 1989)
- Children: 1
- Parents: Boris Dvornik (father); Diana Tomić (mother)
- Musical career
- Genres: Funk; soul; rock; pop; electro; hip-hop
- Instruments: Vocals; guitar; drums; keyboards
- Labels: Suzy; Jugoton; Croatia Records; Dancing Bear
- Formerly of: Kineski Zid

Dino Dvornik (pronounced [dǐːno dʋôːrnik]; 20 August 1964 – 7 September 2008), was a Croatian musician, music producer, actor and reality television star. Often referred to by the nickname "Kralj funka" ("King of Funk"), Dvornik was a highly popular act in Croatian and Yugoslav popular music.

Son of renowned actor Boris Dvornik, Dino Dvornik appeared as a child actor in several Yugoslav films and television series, before starting his musical career in the funk band Kineski Zid, which he formed with his brother Dean Dvornik in 1982. The group split up after releasing only one album, with Dino deciding to start a career as solo artist. His self-titled debut album was released in 1989, gaining commercial success and critical acclaim with its funk and soul sound. His following studio album Kreativni nered, released in 1990, maintained his large mainstream popularity in Yugoslavia. However, the outbreak of the Yugoslav Wars brought discontinuity in his career. During the 1990s and early 2000s, he recorded four more studio albums, all of them well-received by critics and the general public.

Dvornik died in 2008 after overdosing on a mixture of sleeping pills, analgesics and antidepressants. His eighth and last studio album Pandorina kutija was released posthumously during the same year and was followed by a number of tributes to Dvornik by artists from Croatia and the former Yugoslav region.

== Biography ==
=== Early life ===
A son of renowned actor Boris Dvornik and mother Diana Dvornik (née Tomić), Dino was born Miljenko Dvornik on 20 August 1964 in the city of Split, at that time within Yugoslav republic of Croatia. He would play alongside his father in 1970s Yugoslav films and TV series, including the films Daredevil's Time (1977) and Across the Blue Sea (1979), and the TV series Naše malo misto (Our Small Town, 1970–1971) and Čovik i po (A Man and a Half, 1974).

=== Musical career ===
==== Early career (1982–1983) ====
Dino Dvornik had his musical debut in the early 1980s, recording the 7-inch single "Mille non pieu mille" / "Pižolot" with his father. Simultaneously, he formed the band Kineski Zid (Great Wall of China) with his brother Dean Dvornik. They chose the name for the band after a nickname for the Split building in which the Dvornik family lived at that time. The band performed funk music, releasing their self-titled debut album in 1983. The album songs were composed by Dino, while the lyrics were written by Dean Dvornik. The album saw little commercial and critical success, and Kineski Zid disbanded soon after its release.

==== Solo beginnings and instant success (1988–1991) ====
After Kineski Zid split up, Dean moved to the United States, and Dino Dvornik decided to dedicate himself to a career of a solo artist. He spent several years practicing and composing, living in London for a period of time, before making a successful debut as a solo artist on the 1988 Zagreb Festival. Dvornik appeared on the festival with the song "Tebi pripadam" ("I Belong to You"), presenting himself with modern funk sound and winning the first prize awarded by the festival jury. Dvornik's performance was accompanied by dancers, which was not in accordance with the festival's tradition.

The initial success provided Dvornik with an opportunity to record his debut studio album. In Split's Tetrapak studio he recorded his self-titled debut, produced by Dragan Lukić of the band Đavoli. The album songs were composed and music arrangements were written by Dvornik, with most of the album lyrics provided by Goran Kralj, former drummer for the Split band Hangar. Dvornik recorded vocals, keyboards and percussion on the album tracks. The album's modern production, machist lyrics and energetic rhythms had large success with the Yugoslav public. The songs "Ljubav se zove imenom tvojim" ("Love Carries Your Name"), "Ti si mi u mislima" ("You Are in My Thoughts"), "Zašto praviš slona od mene" ("Why Are You Making an Elephant out of Me"), with lyrics for the latter written by Zlatan Stipišić, frontman of the hard rock band Osmi Putnik, became nationwide hits. Dvornik promoted the album by performing mostly in Yugoslav discothèques.

In 1990, on the MESAM festival he was awarded the first prize by both the jury and the audience for the song "Misliš da sam blesav" ("You Think I'm Crazy"). Later during the year, he released his second studio album Kreativni nered (Creative Mess). The album's lyrics were written by Zlatan Stipišić, alternative rock musician Rambo Amadeus and journalist Ozren Kanceljak, and the album featured guest appearances by Đavoli members Neno Belan and Dragan Lukić. The album's main hit "Jače manijače" ("Harder, Maniac") was co-written by Dvornik and Rambo Amadeus; their cooperation was started a year earlier, when Dvornik made a guest appearance on Rambo Amadeus album Hoćemo gusle (We Want Gusle). The song "Jače manijače" was also released on a maxi single, distributed to discothèques across Yugoslavia. Unlike Dvornik's previous promotional tour, Kreativni nered tour featured a backing band, composed of the members of Zadar band Jet Set. However, the outbreak of Yugoslav Wars in 1991 interrupted the tour and made a gap in Dvornik's career.

==== Return to the scene, later releases (1993–2008) ====
In 1993, Dvornik released his third studio album, entitled Priroda & društvo (Nature & Society). On the recording sessions, Dvornik played guitar, bass guitar and keyboards, and the album also featured Dragan Lukić Lvky (keyboards), Zoran Šabijan (keyboards, programming) and Joe Pandur (guitar). The song "Ying & Yang" featured Psihomodo Pop frontman Davor Gobac on vocals, and the song "Rušila sam mostove od sna" ("I Was Tearing Down the Bridges made of Dreams") featured singer Josipa Lisac. With the songs like "Split Junkie", "Ekstasy" and "The Return of the Man With a Rubber Brain" Dvornik turned towards more serious topics. However, the album's techno sound alienated Dvornik from a part of his old fans, and his drug abuse resulted in another hiatus.

In 1995, he appeared on the Split Music Festival with the ode to his home city "Ništa kontra Splita" ("Nothing Against Split"), written by Nenad Vilović, winning the first place. During the same year, he released the live album Live in Munich. The album was recorded on Dvornik's concert in Munich, Germany, on which he was accompanied by the members of the techno group Songkillers. The following year, he released the maxi single "Afrika" ("Africa"), for which he was awarded the Porin award.

In 1997, Dvornik released his fourth studio album, the autobiographical Enfant terrible. The album featured guest appearances by Davor Gobac, Daleka Obala frontman Marijan Ban, singer Stjepan "Jimmy" Stanić, Songkillers, and other acts. Alongside Dvornik's trademark sound, the album also featured his experimentation with different genres in the tracks like "La svraka blues" ("La Crow Blues") and "Male noćne orgulje na plin (a capella)" ("Little Night Gas-Infused Organ (A Capella)"). The album was produced by Dvornik and was awarded the Porin Best Album Production Award. The album was followed by the 1998 compilation album Vidi ove pisme: The Best of Dino Dvornik 1988–1998, offering the overview of Dvornik's ten-year work, with remixes of some old songs and two previously unreleased tracks – "Dr. lake šetnje" ("PhD in Easy Walking") and "Nema mene" ("I'm Not There").

Dvornik's fifth studio album, entitled Big Mamma, was released in 1999. The album songs dealt with crime in Croatian capital Zagreb. The recording of the album lasted over 600 hours. The songs "Dan bezbrižan" ("Care–Free Day"), "Stojadin" (the title being the Yugoslav nickname for Zastava 101 automobile, featuring lyrics written by Zlatan Stipišić) and Latin music track "Ća ća ća" ("Cha Cha Cha") became radio hits. On the New Year's Eve of 2000, Dvornik held a concert in Belgrade, which was his first performance in Serbia since the dissolution of Yugoslavia. In 2001, he covered the song "2002 godine u Splitu!" ("In the Year 2002 in Split!"), originally recorded by singer Oliver Dragojević in 1975, releasing it as a single. In 2002, Dvornik released his sixth studio album Svicky (a slang expression meaning World-Class). The album was produced by Davorin Ilić, with the song "Ne znam kome pripadam" ("I Don't Know Who I Belong To") featuring guest appearance by singer Vanda Vinter.

In his last years, Dvornik would often perform as a DJ in various clubs. Prior to his death, he was working on his seventh studio album, completing most of the album tracks and the video for the first single, "Hipnotiziran" ("Hypnotized").

==== Collaborations and guest appearances ====
In 1989, Dvornik made a guest appearance on Rambo Amadeus album Hoćemo gusle in the song "Glupi hit" ("A Stupid Hit"). In 1991, he appeared as guest on the album Ja verujem (I Believe) by rock singer Viktorija, in the duet "Od Splita do Beograda (Ove Noći)" ("From Split to Belgrade (This Night)"). Dvornik composed songs and wrote music arrangements for and produced Oliver Dragojević's 1994 album Neka nova svitanja (Some New Dawns). In 2005, he made a guest appearance on the Songkillers album Sreća (Happiness) in the song "Egzit" ("Exit"). In 2010, he appeared on the album Veliki umovi 21. stoljeća (Great Minds of the 21st Century) by the hip hop group Bolesna Braća, singing in the song "Mali dečko" ("Little Boy").

=== Other activities ===
For a period of time, Dvornik worked for Croatia Records as editor of the label's Croatian releases.

In 1990, Dvornik acted in Stanko Crnobrnja's television film Love Is a Bread with Nine Crusts. In 2004, he starred in Arsen Ostojić's film A Wonderful Night in Split, portraying a Split drug lord.

In 2006, Dvornik and his family became the stars of the Croatian reality show Dvornikovi (The Dvorniks), a show in the manner of The Osbournes, aired on Croatian RTL.

== Death ==
On 7 September 2008, 18 days following the celebration of his 44th birthday, Dvornik died in his bed. His wife Danijela found him dead in bed in their apartment at 11:00 AM. The police investigation revealed that he has been overdosed on the mixture of sleeping pills, analgesics and antidepressants. Three days later, Dvornik was buried at the Mirogoj Cemetery in Zagreb.

== Posthumous releases ==
Following Dvornik's death, Dancing Bear record label released the maxi single "Hipnotiziran", featuring three different versions of the song, with remixes done by Sinteks, Jan Peters and Rene aka Maker. Soon after, the label posthumously released Dvornik's last studio album Pandorina kutija (Pandora's Box). The album was produced by Srđan Sekulović, and included, as a bonus track, the song "Sretan Božić, sretna Nova godina" ("Merry Christmas and a Happy New Year"), with guest appearance by Davor Gobac. The album was released with short biographical book Kralj fanka (King of Funk). Two years later, a special edition of the album was released, including a DVD with music videos and photographs and a disc with the songs Dvornik was working on before his death. The songs "Splitska noć" ("Split Night") and "Ko sam onda ja" ("Who Am I, Then") were completed by DJ Haris Ćustović, and the song "Shlapa (Daj mi još tog funka)" ("Shlapa (Give Me More of that Funk))" was completed by hip hop group TBF. The song "Treba mi zraka" ("I Need Some Air") was completed fifteen years after Dvornik's death by Bosnian band Dubioza Kolektiv, with their version featuring recordings of Dvornik's vocals, and released on their 2017 album Pjesmice za djecu i odrasle (Little Songs for Children and Grown-Ups).

In 2015, Croatia Records released the five-disc box set Original Album Collection, featuring reissues of Dvornik's first five studio albums. In 2021, the label released Pandorina kutija Special Edition 2021. on vinyl. The vinyl edition included four bonus tracks, including "Pelin i med" ("Absinthe and Honey"), which Dvornik recorded with the group Fabrique de la Musique Aqustique. During the same year, Srđan Sekulović completed Dvornik's unfinished song "Na Karibe" ("To the Caribbean") using Dvornik's demo recordings. The vocals were recorded by singer Alka Vuica, who also wrote lyrics for the song. In 2023, Croatia Records reissued Dvornik's debut album on vinyl. The release featured accompanying texts written by Josipa Lisac, Gibonni, Alka Vuica and Neno Belan.

== Personal life and family ==
In August 1989, Dvornik married his wife Danijela Kuljiš. In 2006, she published the book Dnevnik prgave familije (Diary of the Grumpy Family), with texts originally published on her blog. The two had one child, daughter Ella. Ella Dvornik is today a well-known influencer.

Dino Dvornik's brother and former Kineski Zid bandmate Dean Dvornik started his own solo career in 1995, releasing six studio albums to date. He was also the bass guitarist for the band The Obala (The Coast), recording one album with the group.

Dino Dvornik was a supporter of Croatian football club Hajduk Split.

== Tributes and legacy ==
On 21 June 2009, a group of Croatian musicians held a tribute concert to Dvornik in Split. The concert featured Dean Dvornik and Kineski Zid, Neno Belan, Josipa Lisac, Gibonni, Davor Gobac, Nina Badrić and other artists. The recording on the concert was released in 2010 on the DVD Kontra regula – Tribute to Dino Dvornik. In 2013, hip hop artist Renman dedicated the song "James Brown je pored tebe" ("James Brown Is Standing Next to You") to Dvornik.

Dvornik's songs have been covered by a number of music artists. German saxophonist Angela Puxi recorded a smooth jazz version of Dvornik's song "Pelin i med" in 2015. Journalist Zlatko Turkalj recorded an eight-episode series about Dvornik for Radio Zagreb. For the series, Croatian musicians recorded covers of Dvornik's songs, including "Elle Ee" cover by Antonela Doko, Neno Belan and Igor Geržina, "Ti si mi u mislima" cover by Tony Cetinski, "Rušila sam mostove od sna" cover by Noa and Vanda Vinter, and "Ljubav se zove menom tvojim" cover by Matija Dedić and Protokol. These covers were, alongside some of Dvornik's hits, released on the double compilation album Zimzeleno A novo (Evergeen But New) in 2018. In 2018, Croatian band Buđenje recorded a cover of "Misliš da sam blesav", Croatia Records releasing the cover on a vinyl single alongside original version.

A street on the island of Brač on which Dvornik family house was situated is named after Boris and Dino Dvornik. In September 2017, in the Rock 'n' Roll Park situated in the garden of Zagreb club Beertija, a monument to Dino Dvornik was unveiled. The monument was created by sculptor Tomislav Heršak.

In 2015, Dvornik's self-titled debut album was polled No.48 and Live in Munich was polled No.51 on the list of 100 Greatest Yugoslav Albums published by the Croatian edition of Rolling Stone.

== Discography ==
=== Studio albums ===
- Dino Dvornik (1989)
- Kreativni nered (1990)
- Priroda & društvo (1993)
- Enfant terrible (1997)
- Big Mamma (1999)
- Svicky (2002)
- Pandorina kutija (2008)

=== Live albums ===
- Live in Munich (1994)

=== Compilation albums ===
- Vidi ove pisme: The Best of Dino Dvornik 1988–1998 (1998)
- The Ultimate Collection (2009)
- Zimzeleno A novo (2018)
- Greatest Hits Collection (2019)

=== Box sets ===
- Pandorina kutija Special Edition (2010)
- Original Album Collection (2014)

=== Singles ===
- "Jače manijače" (maxi single, 1990)
- "Imam rep" (maxi single, 1992)
- "Afrika" (1996)
- "2002 godine u Splitu!" (2001)
- "Hipnotiziran" (maxi single, 2008)
