= Lake Fest =

Montenegrin music festival

- Genre: Rock and roll, alternative rock, electronic music
- Dates: 3 days, each August
- Locations: Krupac Lake, Nikšić, Montenegro
- Years active: 2021–
- Website: lake-fest.me/index.php

Lake Fest is a Montenegrin music festival that takes place in the municipality of Nikšić, on the shores of Lake Krupac. The festival is held during the summer and, in recent years, has traditionally taken place at the beginning of August as a three-day event. It features a wide range of music, including rock and roll, alternative, and, in recent years, electronic music.

The lineup mainly includes artists from the former Yugoslavia but also from around the world. Some of the most notable performers have been Manu Chao, Laibach, Guano Apes, Paul van Dyk, Mahmut Orhan, James Zabiela, Dubioza Kolektiv, Rambo Amadeus, Partibrejkers, Urban & 4, Hladno Pivo, Riblja Čorba, Van Gogh, and many others.

Since its founding in 2011, more than 220,000 visitors have passed through the festival gates.

== History ==
Year	Date	Lineup	Ref.
2011. (1)	22–24 July	Shin ei ·Punkreas · Autumn For Free · Post scriptum · Zoster · DST · Letu štuke · Damir Urban · Human · Nagual · Gomila nesklada · Manisent i mentalnost · E-Play · Autogeni trening · Zabranjeno pušenje · Sunshine · H.A.N.T. · Fetah Vibration · The Dojka · Bolesna štenad · Elemental · Kanda, Kodža i Nebojša · Patribrejkersi · Dubioza kolektiv	
2012. (2)	20–22 July	Marble · ZAA · Čovek bez sluha · Edo Maajka · DST · Atomsko sklonište · Damir Urban · Beogradski sindikat · Demodemolls · Lude Krawe- · Zemlja gruva! · Hypnotized · Darko Rundek · Električni orgazam · Ritam nereda · Block Out · Brzi bend Crtinja · Zoon politikon · 16x8x23 · Jarboli · Autogeni trening · Bjesovi · Psihomodo pop · Marky Ramone's Blitzkrieg	
2013. (3)	19–21 July	Beer & Steel · Hipotalmus · HBŠ · Happy Hour · Mikrokozma · Six Pack · Neozbiljni pesimisti · Deca loših muzičara · Goblini · Hladno pivo · Goribor · LUR · Spank · Pogonbgd · Sharks, Snakes & Planes · Pištolj na gumene metke · Skroz · Postolar Tripper · Obojeni program · Disciplin a Kitschme}- ·Pozdrav Azri · Let 3 ·Ućuti pas · Sivi · Hadži prodane duše · Innergate · Decomposing Entity · Iskaz i Marčelo · Atheist Rap · Eyesburn · Plejboj · Bajaga i instruktori · Bad Copy	
2014. (4)	25–27 July	Ubrzo potom · Lutke · Popečitelji · Vrooom · Negative · Kultur Shock · Gibonni · Brkovi · Strah od Džeki Čena · Gomila nesklada · Zoster · S.A.R.S. · DST · Orthodox Celts · Laibach · Feud · PPG · Kiza bluz bend · Veliki prezir · Nagual · Davorin i Bogovići · Dječaci · Van Gogh · Sunshine}	
2015. (5)	11–16 August	Masturbeator · Pogrešna odluka · Alexandria · Mangrov · Sasja · Stereo banana · Willie and the Groundskeepers · Antivirus prepelica · Uzemljenje · Holographic Human Element · Shejdi Kruu · Sivilo · Josip A Lisac · Deca apokalipse · Bad Seasons · Strah od Džeki Čena · Vizija · Manitou · Igra duhova · Tuhhtš i Espikuer · Samostalni referenti · Podroom · ZAA · Mortal kombat · Iskaz · Guano Apes · Bjesovi · Prti Bee Gee · Ničim izazvan · Pankrti · DST · Goblini · Riblja čorba · Babe · Zahed Sultan · Kolja i grobovlasnici · Elemental · Rundek Cargo Trio · Orthodox Celts · Dejan Petrović big bend · Who See · Koza mostra	
2016. (6)	11–14 August	Voodoo · Off Duty · Mangrov · Rambo Amadeus · Bajaga i instruktori · Kultur Shock · Sivilo · Light Under the Black Mountain · Zoon politikon · M.O.R.T. · Kerber · Goran Bare i Majke · Kiril Džajkovski · Nikola Vranjković · Justin's Johnson · Irish Stew of Sindidun · Lačni Franc · DST · YU Grupa · Dejan Petrović big bend · Ritam nereda · Aurora · Sara Renar · Punkreas · Stray Dogg · The Beat Fleet · Manu Chao La Ventura · Gužva u 16-ercu	
2017. (7)	11–13 August	Mikrokozma · Buč Kesidi · Justin's Johnson · Gomila nesklada · Zabranjeno pušenje · Hladno pivo · BandX · Bad Copy · Galija · Natali Dizdar · Gru · OPG · Parampašćad · Talisco · Freedom · Porto Morto · Pero Defformero · Mortal kombat · Neverne bebe · Kiril Džajkovski · Samostalni referenti	
2018. (8)	9–11 August	Rudolf · Barbara Munjas · Orthodox Celts · Perper · Zoster · Ritam nereda · Iskaz · Kontradikšn · KBO! · Atomsko sklonište · Van Gogh · Goblini ·Punkreas · Bubnjivi · Helem nejse · Vlatko Stefanovski trio · DST · Marčelo · Kawasaki 3P	
2019. (9)	8–10 August	Akademija · Stereo banana · The Beat Fleet · Željko Bebek · Dog Eat Dog · Nikola Vranjković · Off Duty · Killo Killo Banda · Ibrica Jusić · Bombaj štampa · Punkreas · Prti Bee Gee · Aklea Neon · Kolja i grobovlasnici · Artan Lili · Kerber · Najda i Smak tribjut · Love Hunters	
2020.	The tenth edition of Lake Fest was scheduled to be held from 6 to 8 August 2020. However, the festival did not take place that year due to the COVID-19 pandemic.		
2021. (10)	5–7 August	Rudolf · Mortal kombat · Hladno pivo · Psihomodo pop · Nikola Vranjković · Parampaščad · Zoster · Goblini · Sunshine · Six Pack · Štrajk mozga · Dejan Petrović big bend · Bjesovi · Ritam nereda · Iskaz	
2022. (11)	4–6 August	Vrpca ·DST · Piloti · Black — Metallica tribute · Agents of Time · Marko Nastić · Deca iz vode · Atheist Rap · Van Gogh · Negative · Ten Walls · Lea Dobričić · Kraljevski apartman · Kanda, Kodža i Nebojša · Bolero · Vojko V · Pol van Dajk · Dejan Milićević	
2023. (12)	4–6 August	Gladni naučnici · Tribjut Idoli · Bijelo dugme · Brkovi · Tom Novi · Punkreas · Partibrejkers · YU Grupa · Kerber · Mahmut Orhan Električni orgazam · Smak+ · Zoster · Vojko V · Džejms Zabijela	
2024. (13)	9–11 August	Na brzaka · Jelene · Eliza Stark & The Dappers · Subverzija · Željko Bebek · Prljavo kazalište · Funk Shui · Murat Unčuoglu · Tantra Brothers · Azilanti · Devet · Marčelo · Queen Sensation · Splin · Ritam nereda · Fede le Grand · Petrikor · Mikrokozma · Logička greška · Džanum · Jurica Pađen i Aerodrom · Crvena jabuka · Laibach · Džeks Džouns	
2025. (14)	8–10 August	Kolektiv 0 · Nabrzaka · Dječiji hor Zahumlje · Wider Horizons — Montenegrin Pink Floyd tribute · M.O.R.T. · Kultur Shock · Nikola Vranjković · Paradigma · Roba bez greške · Quiet Dogs · Samostalni referenti · Ring — ABBA tribute · Dr Nele Karajlić · Savršeni marginalci · O’Konrads · Maramitu Mintinu · Dža ili Bu · Bombaj štampa · Dubioza kolektiv · Goblini · Sunshine	

== Official sponsors ==
- Elektroprivreda Crne Gore
- Nikšić Municipality
- Nikšićko rocks
- Tourist Organization of Nikšić
- BusTicket4.me
- Plantaže
- Caffe Montenegro
- Meridianbet
