= Filip Filković =

Filip Filkovic (commonly known as Philatz) (born 8 June 1983 in Zagreb, Croatia) is a Croatian born film director and artist.

Filkovic is the founder of radical art collective Kunstterrorist Organisation in 2004. Kunstterrorist Organisation or KTO was inspired by the Cautese Nationál Postal Disservice - project led by James Cauty (founder of The KLF). In 2007, Filkovic was appointed chief stamp designer for the Cautese Nationál Postal Disservice (C.N.P.D.).

== Kunstterrorist organisation ==
Since the founding of Kunstterrorist Organisation, Filkovic creates limited edition works and thematic postage stamps or also known as cinderella stamps all of which were sold via the official KTO webshop or art galleries. KTO is also involved into street art movement, audio production (as Kunstterrorist Audio Noize), art installations and activism (official website explains that this division is yet to be uncovered). Filkovic also held several art exhibitions showing his latest work.

== Cautese Nationál Postal Disservice ==
The first Filip Filkovic collection of works for C.N.P.D. was released on 15 October 2007. First release was named "War Is Over". The Aquarium Gallery (in their own fashion) noted that the designs are just as good as the James Cauty designs, so even though the labour costs are now a fraction of what they used to be, they will still be charging the same amount as before for all works.

== Other works ==
=== Documentaries ===
- Dulum Zemlje (2020-)
- Oči sokolove (2023-)
- Povratak Životinjama (2023-)
- Ideja Uspona (2022-)
- Zanat (2021-)
- Lovac na bilje (2015-2023)

=== Short films ===
Year	Title	Type	Notes
2016	"Posljednji bunar"	Short film	Director
2012	"Heart juice"	Short film	Director
2006	"Posao"	Short film	Director
2006	"Head Decides"	Short film	Director
2004	"Dysfunctional"	Short film	Director

=== Music videos ===
- Lif Ivor - Never Come Home (2016)
- Nina Kraljić - Lighthouse (2016)
- Brkovi ft. Sassja - Ovce (2016)
- Sassja - PMS (2016)
- Side Project - Guns (2016)
- The Frajle - Menjam dane (2015)
- Irena Žilić - Cricket and mouse (2015)
- Detective Jones - Prljavi pogledi (2015)
- Diyala - Gedup (2015.)
- Side Project - Glitter (2015.)
- Manntra - Put (2014.)
- Vatra - Saturn (2014.)
- Nina Romić - Možda (2014.)
- Control/Resist - TCE (2014.)
- Mozartine - Vrata do nas (2014.)
- Gibonni - Kids in uniform (2014.)
- Mario Huljev - Dođi po još (2014.)
- Vatra - Tango (2014.)
- Tereza Kesovija - Pjesma Nad Pjesmama (2013.)
- The Frajle - Pare vole me (Gramophonedzie remix) (2013.)
- Gibonni - 20th Century Man (2013.)
- VIA Lipe - Zorja (2013.) (kamera, montaža) (Dir. Zdenko Basic)
- Gibonni - Broken Finger (2013.) (kamera, montaža) (Dir. Zdenko Basic)
- Magic Sone - Oki Doki (2013.)
- Gibonni - Hey Crow (2013.) (kamera, scene, kompoziting) (Dir. Zdenko Basic)
- Starkey feat. Karizma & Nina Smith - Space (2013.)
- Lea Dekleva - Gdje Ne Vidis Ocima (2013.) (Dir. Zdenko Basic)
- The Frajle - Fina (2013.)
- Priki - Yustalgija (2012.)
- Edo Maajka - Facebook (2012.)
- Reverse Engineering feat Diyala - Heart Juice (2012.)
- Maja Keuc - You're A Tree and I'm A Balloon (2012.)
- Viktorija Novosel - Astronaut (2012.)
- Edo Maajka - Panika (2011.)
- Diyala - Wander (2011.)
- Ivana Kindl - Nisi Sam (2011.)
- Vatra feat. Ljubica Gurdulic - Ima li budnih? (2011.)
- Gibonni - Vesla na vodi (2011.) (režija: Zdenko Bašić i Manuel Šumberac)
- Vatra feat. Damir Urban - Tremolo (2011.)
- Hladno pivo - Ezoterija (2011.)
- Ex Mozartine feat. Damir Urban - Glas Jeka (2011.)
- Pankreas - D.C. Biu (2010.)
- Luka Nižetić - Život curi (2010.)
- Gibonni - Toleranca (2010.) (režija: Zdenko Bašić i Manuel Šumberac)
- Ivana Kindl - Promjenjiva (2010.)
- Vatra - Dva akrobata (2009.)
- Gibonni - Žeđam (2009.) (režija: Zdenko Bašić i Manuel Šumberac)
- Ramirez - Fantastično, bezobrazno (2009.)
- Detour - Prijatelj (2009.)
- Lollobrigida - Volim te (2009.)
- Vatra - Svjetla i sirene (2009.)
- Vatra - Eskim (2008.)
- Khan - Moj dan (2008.)
- Natali Dizdar - Naučila sam trik (2007.)
- Vatra - Miss (2007.)
- Vatra - Privatni pakao (2007.) (režija: Dinko Klobučar)
- Vatra - Mornarska majica (2007.) (režija: Dinko Klobučar)

== Music ==
Filkovic is involved in music production of Kunstterrorist Audio Noize, sound division from Kunstterrorist Organisation. The first EP by the band should be (according to Myspace profile) be released in the first quarter of 2008. As Cold War Atomic Orchestra, Filkovic is producing (as mentioned on the official Myspace profile) high-end novelty orchestral and electronic music. Both bands are signed to anti-label company "Death To Music" founded by James Fogarty. In 2009, Filkovic had set up Cellular Control to promote his latest musical experiment.

== See also ==
- Anti-art
