= Tuzla Film Festival =

- Location: Tuzla, Bosnia and Herzegovina
- Founded: 2012
- Directors: Boris Balta
- Language: International
- Website: www.tff.ba

The Tuzla Film Festival is an annual film festival that takes places in Tuzla, Bosnia and Herzegovina.

== Focus ==
The Tuzla Film Festival is organized by Magic Factory, with the aim of promoting South Slavic cinematography.

== History ==
Organizational efforts for the first festival began in 2010, requiring two full years because of lack of financial and human resources. The first festival occurred on August 22, 2012, at the Bosnian Cultural Center in Tuzla. In attendance were actors, directors, producers and business people from the former Yugoslavia.

The second festival featured a casting call for the film Atomski s desna directed by Srđan Dragojević, in which two local children (Ensar Hamzić and Danis Aljić) became the first children of Tuzla to be cast in a feature film.

The third annual festival introduced an international film competition.

== Categories ==
Tuzla Film Festival includes the following categories:

- feature film
- documentary
- short
- animated movie

In addition, the Tuzla Film Festival has two special categories:

- "Shoot with anything"
- "Future generation short films"

These categories aim to encourage participation of young filmmakers.

== Awards ==
The main award at the festival is called Vila TFF

=== Vila TFF for the best feature movie ===
Year	English title	Original title	Director(s)	Country
2012	Death of a Man in the Balkans (2012 film)	Smrt čoveka na Balkanu	Miroslav Momčilović	Serbia
2013	A Stranger (2013 film)	Obrana i zaštita	Bobo Jelčić	Croatia
2014	See You in Montevideo (2014 film)	Montevideo, vidimo se	Dragan Bjelogrlić	Serbia
2015	Our Everyday Life (2015 film)	Naša svakodnevna priča	Ines Tanović	Bosnia and Herzegovina
2016	Death in Sarajevo (2016 film)	Smrt u Sarajevu	Danis Tanović	Bosnia and Herzegovina
2017	The Constitution (2016 film)	Ustav Republike Hrvatske	Rajko Grlić	Croatia
2018	Miner (2017 film)	Rudar	Hanna Slak	Slovenia
2019	God Exists, Her Name Is Petrunija(2019 film)	God Exists, Her Name Is Petrunija	Teona Strugar Mitevska	North Macedonia

=== Vila TFF for the best short movie ===
Year	English title	Original title	Director(s)	Country
2012	Bardo (2012 film)	Bardo	Marija Apchevska	North Macedonia
2013	—N/a	Priča bez kraja (2013 film)	Elvir Muminović	Bosnia and Herzegovina
2014	Boxed (2014 film)	Kutija	Nebojša Slijepčević	Croatia
2015	If the Sheep were Pink (2015 film)	Kad bi ovce bile roze	Đurđija Radivojević	Serbia
2016	The Beast (2015 film)	Zvjerka	Daina Oniunas Pusić	Croatia
2017	Iron Story (2017 film)	Zeleznata prikazna	Zlatko Kalenikov	North Macedonia
2018	The Last Well (2017 film)	Posljednji bunar	Filip Filković	Croatia
2019	Tina & Sendy (2018 film)	Tina & Sendy	Hani Domazet	Croatia

=== Vila TFF for the best documentary movie ===
Year	English title	Original title	Director(s)	Country
2012	—N/a	Bijelo Dugme (2012 film)	Igor Stoimenov	Serbia
2013	Mother Europe (2013 film)	Mama Europa	Petra Seliškar	Slovenia
2013	—N/a	Neke djevojke su veće od drugih	Anja Kavić	Bosnia and Herzegovina
2014	Nobody's (2014 film)	Ničiji	Jadran Boban	Croatia
2015	—N/a	Prolaz za Stellu	Ljiljana Šišmanović	Croatia
2016	Vietnam	Vijetnam	Jovana Kovanović	Serbia
2017	Scream For Me Sarajevo	Scream For Me Sarajevo	Tarik Hodžić	Bosnia and Herzegovina
2018	Lica Lafore	The Faces of Lafora	Denis Bojić	Bosnia and Herzegovina
2019	Poštovana predsjednice	Dear Mrs. President!	Daniel Pavlić	Croatia

=== Vila TFF for the best animated movie ===
Year	English title	Original title	Director(s)	Country
2012	Dove sei, amor mio (2012 film)	Dove sei, amor mio	Veljko Popović	Croatia
2013	—N/a	Fibonaccijev kruh (2013 film)	Danijel Žeželj	Croatia
2014	Aleric (2013 film)	Alerik	Vuk Mitevski	North Macedonia
2015	Secret Laboratory of Nikola Tesla (2015 film)	Tajni laboratorij Nikole Tesle	Bruno Razum	Croatia
2016	Ghost Town (2016 film)	Grad duhova	Marko Dješka	Croatia
2017	The Dragon	Aždaja	Ivan Ramadan	Bosnia and Herzegovina
2018	White Crow	Bijela vrana	Miran Miošić	Croatia
2019	Malleus Dei	Malleus Dei	Dino Krpan	Croatia

=== Vila TFF for the best film in "Future Generation Short Films" category ===
Year	English title	Original title	Director(s)	Country
2016	Face to Face (2016 film)	Lice u lice	Valerie Knill	Germany
2017	Revelation – The City Of Haze	Revelation – The City Of Haze	Mao Qichao	China
2018	The Box	The Box	Aristeidis Deligiannidis	Greece
2019	Elisabeth	Elisabeth	Noemi d'Ursel, Laura Bossicart	Belgium

== Notable guests ==
People who visited the festival include:

- Lazar Ristovski
- Enis Bešlagić
- Emir Hadžihafizbegović
- Nikola Kojo
- Zlatan Zuhrić
- Jelena Perčin
- Slaven Knezović
- Srđan Dragojević
- Robert Kurbaša
- Asim Ugljen
- Zijad Gračić
- Ademir Kenović
- Hrvoje Barišić
- Miloš Samolov
- Miroslav Momčilović
- Mira Banjac
- Milutin Karadžić
- Filip Juričić
- Zijah Sokolović
- Momčilo Otašević
- Adnan Hasković
