= KinoKlub =

Croatian band

- Origin: Zagreb, Croatia
- Genres: Pop punk, pop rock
- Years active: 2008–2016
- Labels: Aquarius Records
- Members: Luka Tomaš; Mario Mlakar; Damjan Spajić; Goran Rusmir

KinoKlub was a Croatian pop-punk band from Zagreb, Croatia. It consisted of Luka Tomaš (vocals), Damjan Spajić (guitar/vocals), Goran Rusmir (bass guitar) and Mario Mlakar (drums). Ex-members: Tomislav Šušak (bass guitar) and Dinko Sinovčić (drums). Their debut album "Ajmo klinci" was released on April 30 2010. The band was signed to Aquarius Records, and was from Zagreb, Croatia. The band has released three singles to date, all charting high in the Croatian music charts, the regional MTV Adria music channel and the Croatian news portal Index. Their first video for the song "Za nju" has reached over two million hits on YouTube. Their third single, "Nije bed, imamo 20min pješke", was also chosen as the theme song for the startup of the Croatian TV channel RTL 2. The band has shared the stage with Sum 41 and The Get Up Kids and played at some of the largest festivals in the region, including EXIT in Novi Sad, Serbia, in 2011. In 2014, they released the EP Henganje with six new songs, including "Slatka tajna, a nije slatkiš", "Druge žene" and "Oh ne, Langolijeri!".

On February 26, 2016, the band announced on their official Facebook page that they would no longer be playing together.

== Awards and nominations ==
In 2011, KinoKlub received a Porin, the prestigious Croatian music award, in the category 'Best New Artist'. They were also nominated in the categories 'Hit of the Year' and 'Rock Album of the Year'.

== Albums ==
- Ajmo klinci (2010)
- Henganje EP (2014)

== Singles ==
Name
Za nju
Vrati se u Zagreb
Nije bed, imamo 20 minuta pješke
Nešto
Idemo dalje
Druge žene
Oh ne, Langolijeri!
Slatka tajna, a nije slatkiš
