= Cesarica =

Single by Oliver Dragojević

from the album Melodije Hrvatskog Jadrana
- Released: September 4, 1993
- Recorded: Rokoko Studio, Zagreb
- Genre: Pop
- Length: 4:17
- Label: Croatia Records
- Songwriter: Zlatan Stipišić Gibonni
- Producer: Stipica Kalogjera

Oliver Dragojević singles chronology
"Bez tebe" (1992)	"Cesarica" (1993)	"Arja" (1994)

Music video
- "Cesarica" (official music video) on YouTube

"Cesarica" is a song by Croatian artist Oliver Dragojević. It was written by Zlatan Stipišić Gibonni and produced by Stipica Kalogjera. It was released as a single in 1993 following a performance at Melodije Hrvatskog Jadrana (MHJ) and it was included in the album titled Melodije Hrvatskog Jadrana. The song was highly successful at the 1994 Porin Awards winning in the categories for Song of the Year, Hit of the Year, Best Male Vocal Performance and Best Arrangement. To promote the song, Dragojević filmed a music video.

== Background and recording ==
Zlatko Gall interviewed Oliver Dragojević in his book Splitska dica - od zidića do vječnosti and described how the song came to fruition. Dragojević revealed how the song was initially written by Gibonni for Vinko Coce. He added,

Cesarica was a turning point and gave all my future projects and songs a special tone. After it, young people started listening to me, a completely new sort of audience discovered me. Due to Cesarica my older recordings came out of the dust, so young people who have never listened to me turned to classics: Malinkonija, Papi, Galebu. It was a turning point in my career, people got aware that I exist, but also that I existed before new songs. While I played at discos, there were rows filled with new audience which knew my old songs by heart.

Speaking about the song, Gibonni revealed how he presented two songs to Zdenko Runjić, the organiser of Melodije Hrvatskog Jadrana (MHJ), titled "Cesarica" and "Dobri ljudi" (English: "Good people"). He initially agreed with Runjić to perform the latter song and give the former one to Dragojević. The following day, he visited Dragojević who immediately liked the song. Gibonni used a pen to write the lyrics on a piece of paper, however, while the two took a break in his living room, Dragojević's dog Luna ate the paper after which he could only come up with the words again with difficulty. Dragojević then went to the studio Rokoko in Zagreb and asked Gibonni how he wanted him to sing the song to which he replied that he should do it "in his own way". He recorded several versions of the song, taking two hours in total. Gibonni further elaborated on hiw own writing of the song:

It was necessary to use only twenty minutes [to write it], I did not put a lot of effort. And I did not change anything with it, not a single word, comma. It was just the way it was. Unrealistically romantic. It was a song as if it was not meant for the time, and it was 1992. It is like watching an Italian movie or an American musical where everyone is kind, they are smiling, going to the window, everyone is singing.

In 1994, it won four Porin Awards, including in the categories for Song of the Year, Hit of the Year, Best Male Vocal Performance and Best Arrangement. According to a list of top five best Croatian songs of all time compiled by RTL television show Croatian Number One published in 2021 and taking in account week at number one on charts, number of sales and air time, "Cesarica" ranked at number one.

== Live performances ==
In 1994, Oliver and Gibonni performed the song live at the 1994 Porin ceremony held at Hotel Kvarner in Opatija. This performance was later listed as one of the ten most interesting performances at the show by portal Glazba.hr.

On 14 June 1994, Oliver and Gibonni performed the song live at the Maksimir Stadium. Oliver later added the song to the set list of his concert tours and performed it live in venues across Europe, including the Olympia Hall in Paris in 2006. The live performance of the song was included on his DVD A l'Olympia (2006). He also performed the song live again at the Porins 2006 in a mash-up with "Nevera" and "Sve bi da za nju".

== Cover versions ==
Numerous cover versions were recorded of "Cesarica". Montenegrin singer Sergej Ćetković and Zsa Zsa performed it live at the Dalibor Petko Show on 23 May 2018. Croatian singer Matija Cvek covered the song live as part of the Trag u Beskraju commemoration concert held in 2023.
