= Vizija =

Macedonian rock band

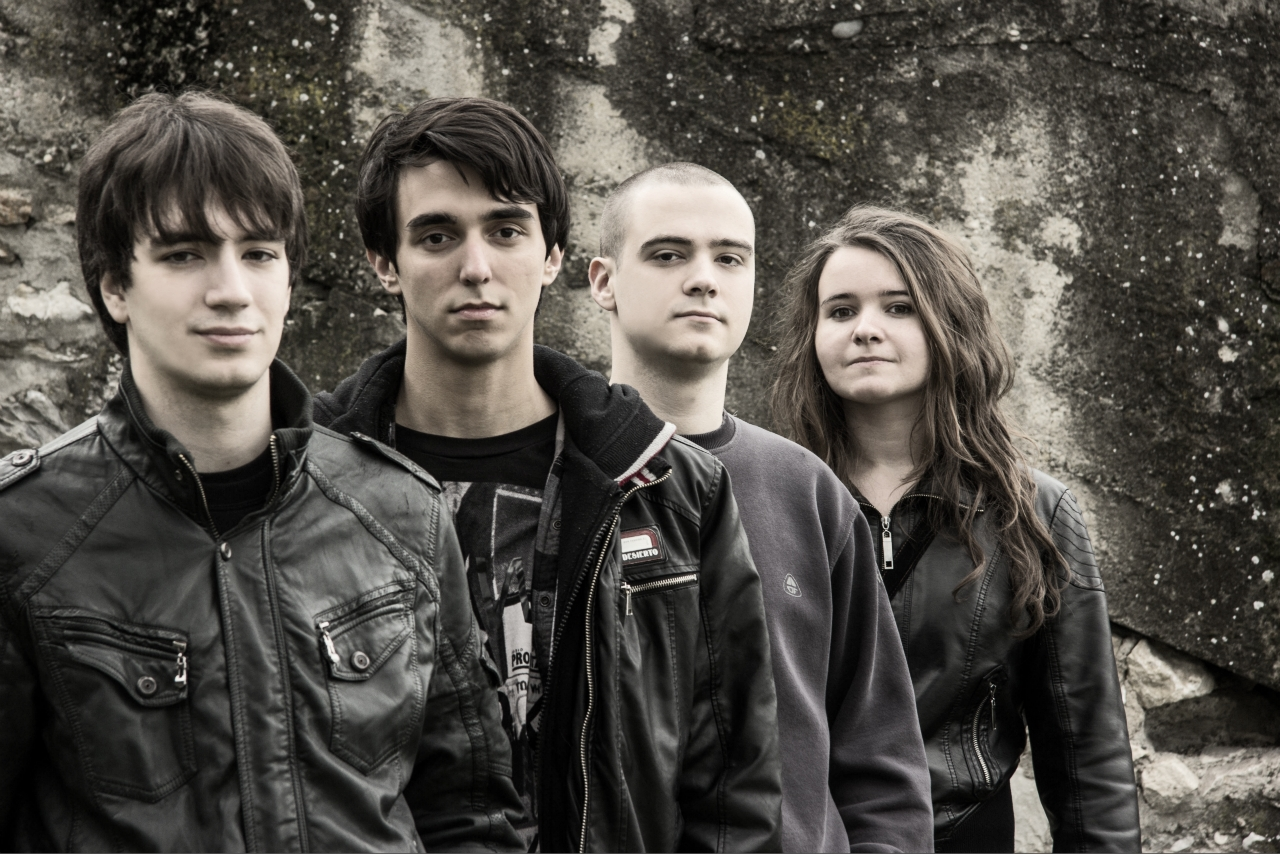
- Vizija

Background information
- Origin: Skopje, North Macedonia
- Genres: Rock, alternative rock, experimental rock
- Years active: November 2011-present
- Members: Marko Dzambazoski; Marko Gapo; Liljana Jankova; Sinisa Gjorgjevic

Vizija (Cyrillic: Визија; English translation: Vision) is a Macedonian rock band formed in November 2011 in Skopje. The band's first performance was at T'k – tak fest 2012 in Kavadarci, shortly followed by the Taksirat music festival in Skopje. Vizija's first performance outside Macedonia was at Skladiste Fest in Kruscic in 2013. The band has performed at some of the biggest festivals in the Balkans like Exit (Serbia), Gitarijada (Serbia), Demofest (Bosnia and Herzegovina), Taksirat (Macedonia), Lake Fest (Montenegro), Mikser (Serbia), T'k - Tak (Macedonia) and Rock n pop the borders (Bulgaria). The band received excellent reviews from the American radio station WMBR and British music website Emerging Indie Bands which, on its list of the 1990s' best new bands from around the world for 2014 placed Vizija in seventh place.

In December 2016, Vizija released its first studio album titled Glasno!. It was first played live on a concert promotion that took place in MKC - Skopje on 8 December 2016.

== Members ==
- Marko Dzambazoski (lead guitar/backing vocals)
- Marko Gapo (lead vocal/rhythm guitar)
- Liljana Jankova (bass guitar/backing vocals)
- Sinisa Gjorgjevic (drums)

== Discography ==
=== Albums ===
- Glasno! (2016)
  - "Glasot na mojata dusha"
  - "Paga Mrak"
  - "Psihopat"
  - "Iluzija"
  - "Zivej"
  - "Glasno!"
  - "Krik"
  - "Zamisli svet..."
  - "Ubij ja tishinata"
