= Vera Svoboda =

- Born: 15 August 1936; Osijek
- Died: 1 April 2024 (aged 87)
- Genres: Croatian folk music, pop
- Occupation: Singer
- Years active: 1952–2024
- Labels: Jugoton, Croatia Records
- Formerly of: Šokadija Women's Choir; Pajo Kolarić Slavonic Tambura Society; Šokačka grana (Osijek)
- Spouse: Julije Njikoš

Vera Svoboda (15 August 1936 – 1 April 2024) was a Croatian singer of popular music, known by the nickname "Queen of tamburica music". She was among the most popular female popular music singers in SFR Yugoslavia of the 1970s.

== Early life ==
Born in Osijek, she spent her childhood and attended primary school in Mikleuš, as well as Franjo Kuhač Music School in Osijek. She studied and graduated English studies at the Pedagogical Academy in Osijek and for a short time taught English in a school in Osijek.

== Music career ==
As a girl, she regularly visited Children's Theatre in Osijek, where she performed in Snow White and Cinderella plays. There she met her future husband, who was accompanist. In 1952, she successfully auditioned as a soloist at Radio Osijek. She sang in the Šokadija Women's Choir and recorded musical materials for the needs of the Radio.

The performance at the Slavonija Music Festival in 1972 marked the beginning of her musical career.

She performed fifty times at the Đakovački vezovi, as well as at the Festival of tambura music in Osijek, Julije Njikoš Days etc. Except throughout Croatia, she performed in Australia, Austria, Belgium, Bosnia and Herzegovina, Denmark, France, Germany, Greece, Iraq, Italy, Kuwait, Netherlands, New Zealand, Norway, Sweden, Switzerland and elsewhere, as well as in Croatian Catholic missions, mostly for Croatian diaspora. From 1990 until her death, she held around 400 charity concerts.

== Personal life ==
She was married with musicologist Julije Njikoš, with whom she had two daughters. She was Roman Catholic.

She died on 1 April 2024 and was buried at the St. Ana Cemetery in Osijek on 5 April 2024.

== Accolades ==
- Order of Danica Hrvatska with the face of Marko Marulić (1995)
- Plaque "Status" by Croatian Musicians Union (2002)
- Porin Lifetime Achievement Award (2022)
- Lifetime Achievement Award of the City of Osijek
- Charter of gratitude of the City of Đakovo (2021) for its contribution to preserving the traditions and customs of Slavonia
