= Kunstterrorist =

Kunstterrorist Organisation (from a German phrase "Kunst" meaning "Art"), aka KTOrg, is a radical art collective from Croatia founded by graphic designer/artist Filip Filkovic.

== Art ==
KTOrg is probably best known for the controversial political art works created by its founder, Filip Filkovic. Filkovic was also involved in the making of art pieces for the Cautese Nationál Postal Disservice project founded by James Cauty of The KLF. Together with Cauty, Filkovic created some of the works in 2007 and 2008 until the final closure of CNPD. According to the official website of Kunstterrorist Organisation, all the works ever created and published via their web shop hold direct reference to popular culture via dystopian and counterculture themes, and also directly criticizes the world government's policies and the erosion of freedom. Along with limited edition printed works, Filkovic also produces Cinderella stamp artwork. During the C2 exhibition in Zagreb in 2008, Filkovic published a number of highly controversial works which reflected the popular culture and criticised Croatian high officials. His work "iVo", which features Croatian prime minister Ivo Sanader wearing iPod headphones, was a well-discussed work in the media and gathered a number of positive reactions. In addition to "iVo" as an artwork, KTOrg announced that "iVo" (now a fictional character in the fictional monarchy "Counterculture Monarchy of Discordianism") was to be elected president of the monarchy. For that purpose, a fictional website was set up at www.ivoforpresident.com.

== Multimedia activism ==
Along with guerilla activism, members of KTOrg are involved in music production, known as "Kunstterrorist Audio Noize". The audio tracks are released via the British anti-label Death To Music. The band consists of six members and the music varies in genre from electronica to punk/rock and gabba. The members of Kunstterrorist Audio Noize also created a number of remixes for other bands.

== Characteristics ==
KTOrg is influenced by and constantly references the culture jamming movement in art, activism and music. The organisation also strongly supports Copyleft and Free Culture Movement and apparently (according to their official web site) is giving away everything it has ever created for free on December 12, 2012. KTOrg's work also references discordianism as a major influence. The discordianism references are most obvious in the organization's frequent newsletters and the information given on its official web page.
