= Across the Blue Sea =

1979 film

Across the Blue Sea (Priko sinjeg mora) is a 1979 Croatian film directed by Ljiljana Jojić, starring Pavle Vuisić, Antoanela Marinović and Dino Dvornik.

The film was selected for preservation by the Croatian State Archives.
