= Pandorina kutija =

Studio album by Dino Dvornik
- Released: November 28, 2008
- Recorded: 2005–2008
- Genre: rock, pop, funk
- Label: Dancing Bear
- Producer: Dino Dvornik, Srđan Sekulović

Dino Dvornik chronology
Svicky (2002)	Pandorina kutija (2008)

Pandorina kutija (English: Pandora's box) is the last studio album by Croatian composer, songwriter and musician Dino Dvornik, which was released in 2008.

It was released on the Dancing Bear label. The record contains ten songs and is produced by Dino Dvornik and Srđan Sekulović.

The album features guests Davor Gobac, Ivica Krajač, Simo Mraović, Srđan Sekulović, Željko Banić and others.

The album spawned several hits such as "Iden ća ka i moj ćaća" ("I'm going to go like my dad"), "Hipnotiziran" ("Hypnotized"), "Pelin i med" ("Wormwood and honey"), "Nadahnuće" ("Inspiration") and "Sretan Božić, sretna Nova godina" ("Merry Christmas, happy New Year").

The material for the album was recorded from 2005 to 2008 in cooperation with the record label Dancing Bear. The release of the album was announced by the single "Hipnotiziran", which was released in the summer of 2008. The single was at the top of the charts immediately after its release, while the promotion itself was the last. Along with the album, a book called "Kralj funka" ("The King of Funk") was published, which contains numerous photos from the Dvornik family album.

In 2009, Dino Dvornik received the prestigious Croatian record award Porin in the categories album of the year, best pop album, best art design, best video number and lifetime achievement for this album.

Dino Dvornik was also nominated for song of the year, best male vocal performance, best collaboration, best arrangement, best production and best recording.

== Background ==
In mid 2000s, Dvornik created reality show Dvornikovi (eng. Dvorniks) which was inspired by Osbournes. It was aired on RTL. In February 2008, he competed at Dora with song "Milina", but lost to Kraljevi ulice.

His father Boris died in March 2008. In July that year, Dvornik gave last interview. His last public appearance was at Hajduk-Deportivo match in late August 2008.

On September 6, 2008, Dvornik died at the age of 44, almost 6 months after his father. The autopsy performed immediately after the singer's death on in Zagreb did not specify the cause, but stated that Dvornik's state of health was good and that no changes were found in the organs that could cause death. His wife Danijela stated Dino had died of a mixture of tranquilizers, sleep, for pain, antidepressants, and occasionally methadone therapy. The real reason for his mental pain was the death of his father, who died only six months earlier.

He was cremated in Zagreb cemetery Mirogoj, and his family had told those who will come to the funeral not to wear black. His wish was that people come to his funeral dressed as for a concert, and not in black.

== Album ==
The tragic death of Dino Dvornik left unfinished material for the album (eight songs). However, the collaborators who worked on the album continued and finished the job as best as they could. In the opening song "Iden ća ka i moj ćaća" Dino Dvornik sounds as if he dedicated it to his roots, while "Zašto mi to radiš" is a decent song that leans towards pop and funk styles. The album also contains the routine house songs "Ideja" and "Nadahnuće", and the classic rock ballad "Pelin i med". The album cover is also interesting because it can be folded into Pandorina kutija. Pandorina kutija is also available on an old vinyl. There are five songs on each side, and it was released in a limited circulation.

== Track list ==
No.	Title	Length
1.	"Iden ća ka i moj ćaća"	3:54
2.	"Hipnotiziran"	3:51
3.	"Ideja"	4:20
4.	"Više ili manje"	4:09
5.	"Pelin i med"	3:49
6.	"Zašto mi radiš to"	3:36
7.	"Nadahnuće"	4:03
8.	"Ljubav do boli"	4:24
9.	"Sretan Božić, sretna Nova godina (feat. Davor Gobac)"	4:50
10.	"Hipnotiziran (Rene aka Maker & Jan Peters remix)"	5:58

== Promotion ==
The promotion of the album was held on November 29, 2008, at the Zagreb club Saloon, which was attended by his wife Danijela, daughter Ella and brother Dean Dvornik, as well as many of Dino's friends.

I am happy that the album saw the light of day, and infinitely sad that he is gone

— Danijela Dvornik

The promotion was also attended by rock musician Davor Gobac, who together with Dino sang the song "Sretan Božić, sretna Nova Godina" in a duet. Gobac states that with this composition, while they wrote it together, they actually told part of their life story.

They were always a good team, listening to Afrika, listening to Nirvana, racing in black cars and the whole world was theirs. I've never lost a friend in my life, and I've never been to a promotion like this where the lead actor wasn't there. Dino, tonight we drink and sing in your honor!

— Davor Gobac

== Personnel ==
- Production and arrangements – Dino Dvornik, Srđan Sekulović, Željko Banić
- Assistant tone master – Ognjen Sremac
- Music – Dino Dvornik, Srđan Sekulović, Željko Banić
- Texts – Dino and Danijela Dvornik, Sekulović, Banić, Gobac, Mraović, Misurac, Krajač
- Sound recording and mixing – Srđan Sekulović / UFO Studio, Zagreb
- Mastering and additional vocal mix – Miro Vidović / Morris Studio, Zagreb

== Charts ==
Chart performance for Pandorina kutija
Chart (2021)	Peak position
Croatian Domestic Albums (HDU)	1
