= Vatra (band) =

Croatian rock band

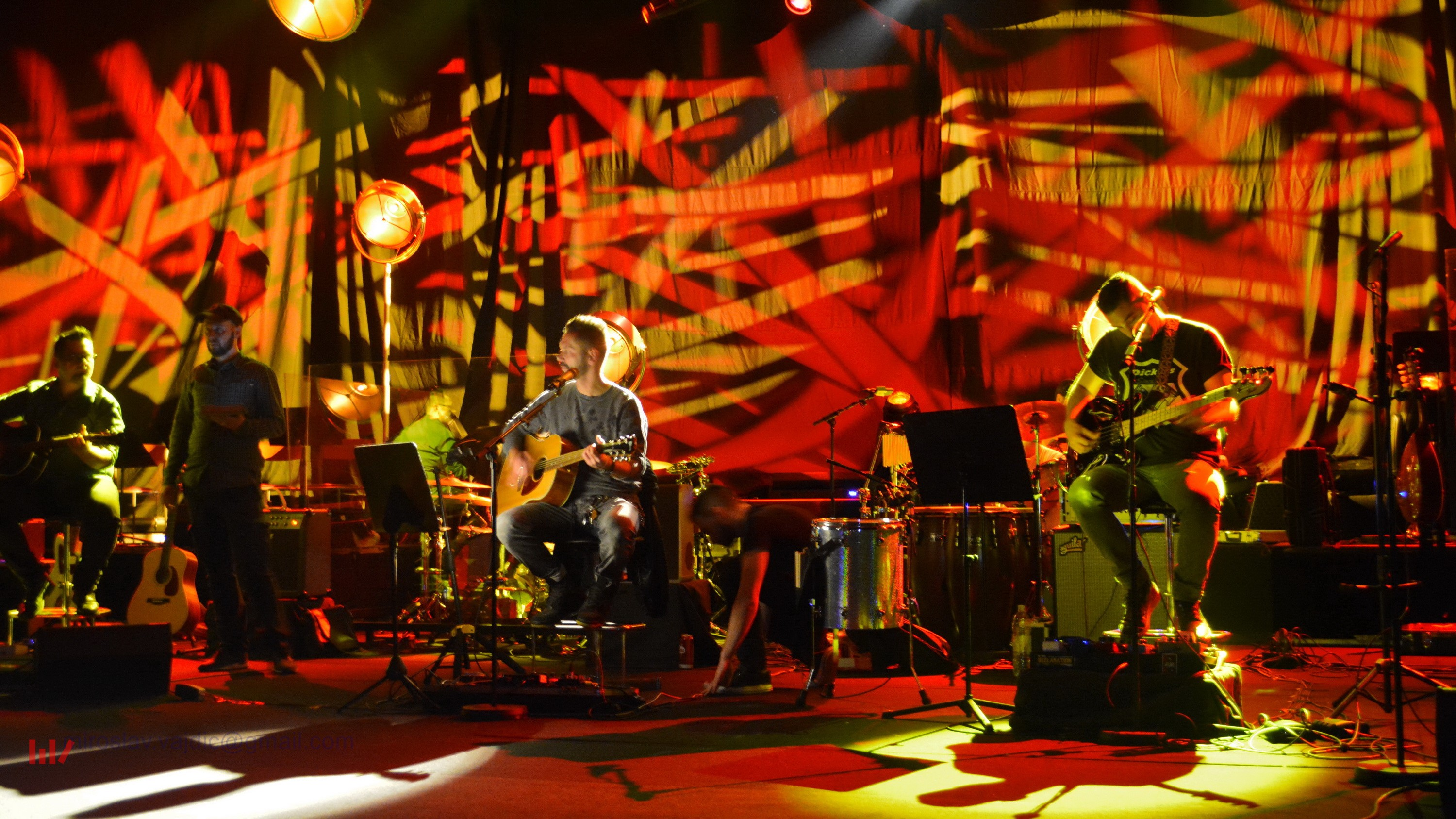
- Vatra during rehearsal in Vatroslav Lisinski Concert Hall, 2016

Background information
- Origin: Virovitica, Croatia
- Genres: Rock and Pop
- Years active: 1999–present
- Labels: Jabukaton, Dallas Records
- Members: Ivan Dečak; Irena Celio; Robert Kelemen; Tomislav Franjo Šušak; Mario Robert Kasumović

Vatra is a Croatian rock band. The song "Tremolo", featuring Damir Urban, won them the Porin for the best vocal cooperation of 2012.

The band was among the participants of Dora 2024, the Croatian selection for the Eurovision Song Contest 2024, with the song "Slatke suze, gorka ljubav"; they advanced from their semi-final on 23 February 2024.

== Discography ==
=== Studio albums ===
- Između nas, Jabukaton, 1999
- Anđeo s greškom, Dallas Records, 2002
- Prekid programa, Dallas Records, 2004
- Aritmija, Dallas Records, 2006
- Sputnik, Dallas Records, 2008
- Ima li budnih, Dallas Records, 2011
- VT, Dallas Records, 2013
- Zmajevi na vjetru, 2015

=== Singles ===
Title	Year	Peak chart positions	Album
Title	Year	CRO	Album
"Bilo je dobro dok je trajalo"	2013	3	VT
"Vrati se"	2013	22	VT
"Tango"	2014	1	Zmajevi na vjetru
"Vidi kako se smiješ"	2021	1	Javi se kad stigneš
"Nova godina nije se dogodila"	2021	2	Javi se kad stigneš
"Rum na usnama" (featuring Božo Vrećo)	2022	4	Javi se kad stigneš
"Javi se kad stigneš"	2022	1	Javi se kad stigneš
"Meni treba tako malo"	2023	1	Non-album single
"Slatke suze, gorka ljubav"	2024	1	Non-album single
"Nitko osim nas"	2024	2	Non-album single
"Kako smo glupi"	2024	2	Non-album single
"—" denotes releases that did not chart or were not released in that territory.

=== Other charted songs ===
Title	Year	Peak chart positions	Album
Title	Year	CRO	Album
"Zajedno sami"	2022	4	Javi se kad stigneš
