= Dino Dvornik (album) =

Studio album by Dino Dvornik
- Released: January 31, 1989
- Studios: Studio Vilović, Split
- Genres: Funk rock, pop rock
- Label: Jugoton
- Producer: Dino Dvornik

Dino Dvornik chronology
Dino Dvornik (1989)	Kreativni nered (1990)

Singles from Dino Dvornik
- 1. "Zašto Praviš Slona Od Mene / Ljubav Se Zove Imenom Tvojim" Released: December 1988; 2. "Tebi Pripadam" Released: 1988

Dino Dvornik is the debut album by Croatian singer Dino Dvornik. Released in 1989, the album is a mix of funk and pop rock. The album sold over 750,000 copies.

== Background ==
Dvornik debuted at the 1988 Zagrebfest with the song Tebi pripadam ("I Belong to You"). The record's biggest hits are Lady, Zašto praviš slona od mene ("Why Are You Making a Fool Out of Me?"), Ljubav se zove imenom tvojim ("Love Calls its Own Name") and Ti si mi u mislima ("You're on My Mind").

== Track listing ==
- All music by Dino Dvornik. All lyrics by Goran Kralj, except where noted.

No.	Title	Writer(s)	Length
1.	"Zašto praviš slona od mene?"	Zlatan Stipišić Gibonni (uncredited additional lyrics)	4:24
2.	"Tebi pripadam"		3:34
3.	"Baš sam ljut"		4:05
4.	"Neću da znam za nikog osim tebe"		3:52
5.	"Ti si mi u mislima"	Dvornik, Dragan Lukić	4:17
6.	"Lady"		3:58
7.	"Ja više nisam tvoj"		3:21
8.	"Ljubav se zove imenom tvojim"		4:38

== Personnel ==
- Dino Dvornik - percussion, drum machine, vocals, occasional keyboards
- Silvije Skare - lead guitar
- Dragan Lukic - synthesizer, brass, keyboards and occasional percussion
- Mladen Baucic - tenor saxophone
- Sinisa Kovacevic - alto saxophone
- Goran Kralj - bass drum, snare drum
- Zeljko Sapmajer - brass, synthesizers
- Tilly and Neno Belan - vocals, backing vocals

=== Additional personnel ===
- unknown musicians - bass, vocals
