= Anton Marti =

- Anton Marti
- Born: Anton Martinčić; 10 April 1923; Labin, Kingdom of Italy
- Died: 21 January 2004 (aged 80); Zagreb, Croatia
- Occupations: Producer; director; actor
- Years active: 1949–2004
- Known for: Co-founding Slovenian TV and HRT
- Television: Television Zagreb; TV Ljubljana; Croatian Radiotelevision
- Spouse: Alis Kraševac
- Children: 2
- Mother: Antonija Martinčić-Viskovic
- Awards: Premios Ondas (1972); Rose d'Or (1974); Porin for Lifetime Achievement (1994)

Anton Martinčić better known by his stage name Anton Marti (10 April 1923 – 21 January 2004) was a Croatian television and theatre director and one of the founders of Television Zagreb (today HRT) and Slovenian TV. He directed a large number of entertainment, music, competition and magazine television shows. He is a multiple winner of international and domestic awards, and in 1994 he was awarded the Porin for Lifetime Achievement.

== Biography ==
Anton Martinčić was born on 10 April 1923 in Labin. He was educated in Trieste and finished the academy in Rome. Until 1949, he acted in Italian theater companies, and after that he came to Koper, where he acted, directed and collaborated in the theater, radio drama and other shows of Radio Koper. In 1956, he came to Zagreb and joined the founders of the then Zagreb Television, and directed some of its first shows. He directed, designed and launched many revues, entertainment-musical, feature, and magazine shows for TV Zagreb and TV Ljubljana.

He acted in several films as well as in theatre plays. In addition to his work on the TV stations of the former Yugoslavia (mostly in Zagreb and Ljubljana), he also directed more than 50 theatre plays, mostly in Croatian and Slovenian theatres. In 1968, he broadcast the first colour show in Ljubljana. Some of his most famous TV programmes are Videofon, Licem u lice, Na licu mjesta, Svjetla pozornice, and numerous entertainment and New Year's shows. He directed the broadcasts of the biggest events and festivals, and in the late sixties and early seventies worked on the then-popular show TV magazin. He is the winner of numerous television awards, and in 1994 he received the Porin Award for Lifetime Achievement.

Anton Marti died on 21 January 2004 in Zagreb at the age of 80.
