= Perpetuum Fritule =

Live album by The Beat Fleet
- Released: July 2010
- Recorded: 7 November 2009
- Venue: Močvara (Zagreb, Croatia)
- Genre: Rap rock
- Language: Croatian
- Label: Dallas Records

The Beat Fleet chronology
Galerija Tutnplok (2007)	Perpetuum Fritule (2010)	Pistaccio Metallic (2011)

Perpetuum Fritule is the fifth album by the Croatian hip hop / rap rock band The Beat Fleet and their first live album. It was recorded at the Močvara club in Zagreb on 7 November 2009 and the album was released in July 2010. It was their first release for Dallas Records label, after they left Menart Records and signed for Dallas in 2009.

The album's title is a humorous pun on the musical term Perpetuum mobile (literally meaning "perpetual motion"), in which the second word is replaced by fritule (also known as "fritula" in singular), a type of traditional sweet pastry popular in Dalmatia. In line with the pun, the album cover depicts a drawing of a fritula and the CD notes include a recipe for preparing fritule. This albums is TBF-s most successful album with more than 75,000 copies sold.

The album serves as a kind of greatest hits compilation recorded unplugged and was released in two versions - a double CD release with 21 tracks and a single CD version containing 13 tracks. It was met with considerable critical acclaim, with Marko Podrug of Nova TV giving it 10/10, D. Jagatić of T-Portal website giving it 9/10, and Zlatko Gall of Slobodna Dalmacija giving it four and a half stars out of possible five.

Perpetuum Fritule won the 2011 Porin Award for the Best Concert Album.

== Track listing ==
The following is the track list as they appear on the double CD version. Tracks marked with † are excluded from the single CD release.

1. "Slobodni stil" †
2. "Fantastična"
3. "Tobogan"
4. "Ye'n, dva" †
5. "Malo san maka"
6. "Data"
7. "Pljačka"
8. "Nostalgična"
9. "3logija"
10. "Heroyix"
11. "Bog i zemljani" †
12. "Lud za njom" †
13. "Šareni artikal"
14. "Guzice i sise"
15. "Papilova"
16. "Alles gut" †
17. "Smak svita"
18. "Život je lijep" †
19. "Genije" †
20. "Odjeb je lansiran" †
21. "ST stanje uma"
