= Laufer (band) =

Croatian musical group

Laufer was a rock band from Rijeka, Croatia that was active between 1986 and 1996. They were briefly active again after 2003.

They released two albums in 1994, The Best Off... under the minor label Corona, and Pustinje ("Deserts") under Croatia Records. In 2004, the former label released a compilation album Epitaf ("Epitaph"). The album The Best Off... was released again in 2010 by Dallas Records.

== Pustinje ==
Pustinje

Studio album by Laufer
- Released: 12 October 1994
- Recorded: September 1994
- Studio: Krk island, Croatia, remixed in "RSL Luca" studios Novo Mesto, Slovenia, edited Ljubljana, Slovenia
- Genre: Rock
- Length: 44:09
- Language: Croatian
- Label: Croatia Records, T.R.I.P.
- Producer: Janez Križaj and Laufer with Rob Fraboni

Laufer chronology
The best off... (1993)	Pustinje (1994)	Epitaf (2005)

Pustinje was Laufer's second studio album and was released in 1994 by Croatia Records. The album's material was prepared and recorded at the Krk island, Croatia, and remixed at the "RSL Luca" studios in Novo Mesto, Slovenia, while the final editing and processing was performed in the "Metro" studios, Ljubljana, Slovenia. The album had a good response with the audience and the music critics.

Laufer members: Damir Urban (vocals), Vlado Simčić (electric guitar), Ljubo Silić (bass guitar) and Alen Tibljaš (drums), in September 1994 left for Krk island to prepare and record the material for the new studio album. The recording itself took little time, with most of the songs being recorded in one of the first essays, with the producer performing minor corrections and additional recordings being made in the summer break between the two concert tours. The topics of the songs are the everyday life of the time, such as the angst and confusion pertaining to growing up ("...hey dad, sorry for looking like a dog..."), insomnia, neurosis, anger, the destructive PTSD in the minds of the yesterday's street friends, the search for spirituality in the immaterial and material deserts of grey cities ("... kiss our eyes they are like deserts, where I understand everything without a single word uttered.."), fatigue carved in the faces of passersby, bad news, being strapped for cash and the hopelessness, bad relationships ("...she will never understand what I am talking about.."), resulting with the recognizable, organic, bombastic sound. The optimism can however be felt throughout the album because Pustinje is actually one song divided into several musical parts.

In 1995, they were awarded the Porin music award for the best alternative rock album of the year.

=== Song list ===
1. "Falš" (0:24)
2. "Hej tata" (2:25)
3. "Vampir" (4:08)
4. "Govorim u snu" (4:24)
5. "Viđđđeno" (4:20)
6. "Matematička" (3:22)
7. "Mišolovka" (3:51)
8. "Umorni kompas" (6:07)
9. "Balerina" (3:55)
10. "Mjesečev rog" (7:20)
11. "Pustinje" (5:53)

=== Performers ===
- Damir Urban – lead vocals
- Vlado Simčić – electric guitar
- Ljubo Silić – bass guitar
- Vedran Križan – keyboards
- Alen Tibljaš – drums
- Edi Kraljić – backing vocals
