= Nola (band) =

- Origin: Pula, Croatia
- Genres: Rock; pop rock
- Years active: 1993–1998; 2004–present
- Labels: Adam Records; Croatia Records; Menart Records; Aquarius Records
- Members: Gabrijela Galant Jelenić; Marijan Jelenić; Dean Vitasović; Robert Slama

Nola is a Croatian rock band from Pula, Croatia, formed in 1993. Later in 1994, the group released their debut studio album, Nola.

== Band members ==
Current members

- Gabrijela Galant Jelenić – lead vocals (1993–1998, 2004–present)
- Marijan Jelenić – guitar (1993–1998, 2004–present)
- Dean Vitasović – bass guitar (1993–1998, 2004–present)
- Robert Slama – drums (1993–1998, 2004–present)

== Discography ==
=== Albums ===
- Nola (1994)
- Dio tebe (1995)
- Osmijeh (1997)
- Iznad oblaka (2009)
- Piano (2012)
- Negdje između (2017)

=== Singles ===
Title	Year	Peak chart positions	Album
Title	Year	CRO	Album
"Ne traži od mene"	2020	10	Non-album singles
"—" denotes a single that did not chart or was not released.

== Awards and nominations ==
Year	Association	Category	Nominee / work	Result	Ref.
2009	Porin	Song of the Year	Iznad oblaka	Won	
2010	Istriana Award	Music Act of the Year	Nola	Won	
