= Dragan Lukić Lvky =

Croatian singer, songwriter and music producer

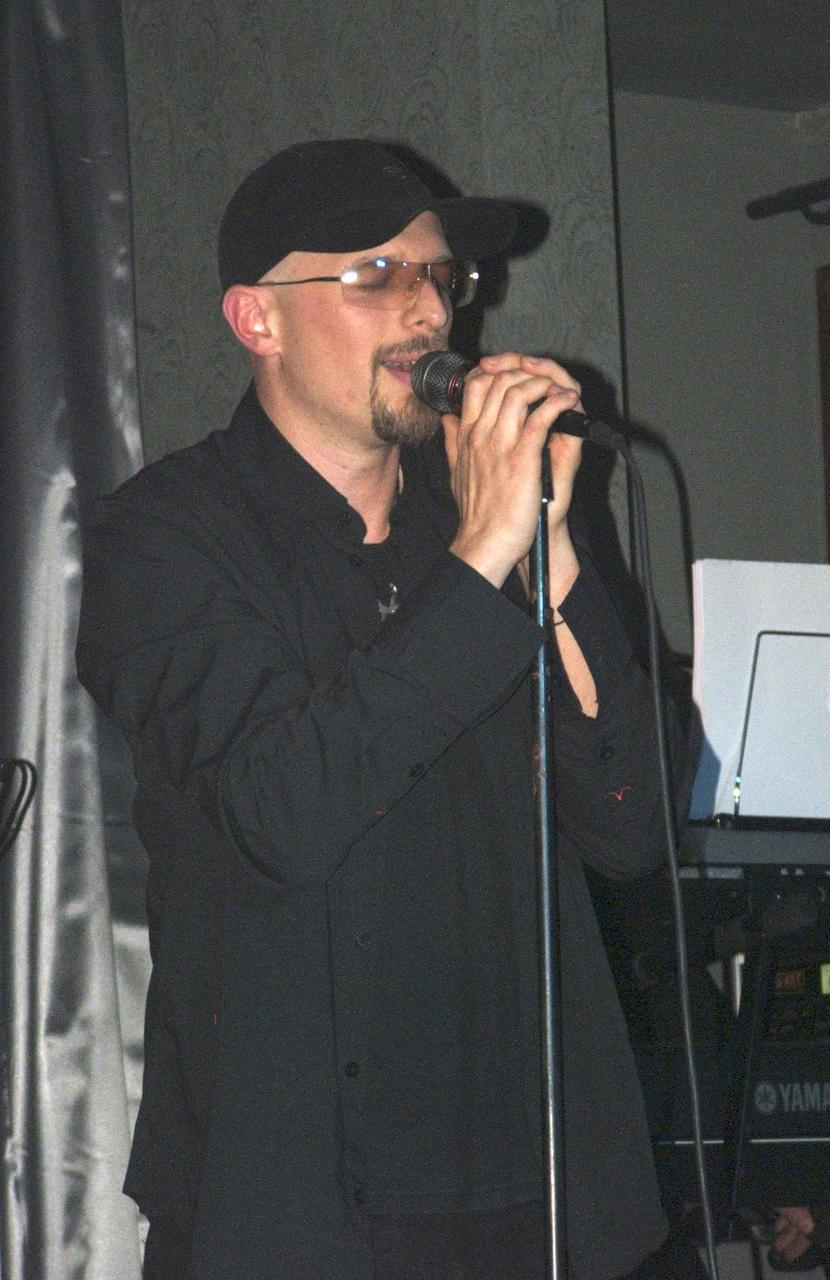
Dragan Lukić Lvky

Dragan Lukić Šegedin (born 3 March 1970) better known by his pseudonyms Lvky and Luky, is a Croatian singer, songwriter and music producer from Split.

Luky became famous in the late 1990s as a producer for various young artists from Split, including the renowned rap band The Beat Fleet (TBF), which he was also a member of; he produced all their releases including their critically acclaimed album Maxon Universal.

In 2003 he started a solo career through his debut album Ararita, using songs influenced by Dalmatian ethno music. He sometimes also cooperates with the klape vocal choirs.

In October 2006 he released his second album V.I.T.R.I.O.L., which received good reviews from the critics and listeners. The album also earned Luky a Zlatna Koogla award as Best Producer.

== Awards ==
Porin award:

- Best Production
  - Žena dijete (1999)
  - Maxon Universal (2005)
  - Galerija Tutnplok (2008)
- Best Rock Album
  - Ararita (2003)
  - Maxon Universal (2005)
- Best Art Design
  - Ararita – Limited (2004)
- Best Recording
  - Galerija Tutnplok (2008)

== Albums ==
- Ararita (2003, Menart Records)
- V.I.T.R.I.O.L. (2006, Menart Records)
- Hvala :) (2012, Aquarius Records)
