= Dvornikovi =

- Genre: Reality series
- Based on: The Osbournes
- Starring: Dino Dvornik; Danijela Dvornik; Ella Dvornik
- Country of origin: Croatia
- Original language: Croatian
- No. of seasons: 2
- No. of episodes: 27

Production
- Production company: Drugi plan

Original release
- Network: RTL
- Release: 4 January 2006 – 13 March 2007

Dvornikovi (Croatian for 'The Dvorniks') is a Croatian reality television series that aired from 2006 to 2007 on RTL. The series followed everyday life and career of the Croatian "King of Funk" Dino Dvornik and his family, which consists of his wife Danijela and their teenage daughter Ella. It is based on MTV's The Osbournes, which similarly documented the life of Ozzy Osbourne.

The first season of the series, consisting of 15 episodes, premiered in January 2006 on RTL. The series ended on 13 March 2007 with its second season.

== Episodes ==
=== Series overview ===
Season	Episodes	Originally released	
Season	Episodes	First released	Last released
1	15	4 January 2006	11 April 2006
2	12	26 December 2006	13 March 2007

=== Season 1 (2006) ===
No. overall	No. in season	Title	Original release date
1	1	"Episode 1"	4 January 2006
2	2	"Episode 2"	11 January 2006
3	3	"Episode 3"	18 January 2006
Dino starts working on a new album and uses family tensions as inspiration, provoking Danijela while trying to make her sing "Skalinada." He visits Ella’s teacher for the first time, tries to take charge as a parent, but Ella quickly outsmarts him and Danijela ends up dealing with the fallout.
4	4	"Episode 4"	25 January 2006
5	5	"Episode 5"	1 February 2006
6	6	"Episode 6"	8 February 2006
Dino arrives for the sound check at the Zagreb-Split highway opening but disappears before the live broadcast. While the crew panics, his friend Bane hangs out at a music session, and Dino spends the day trying to resolve the long‑delayed legalization of the family house with help from Ljubo Ćesić Rojs.
7	7	"Episode 7"	15 February 2006
The family watches Boris’s old war film before Dino rushes to Split for a chaotic reunion with his parents and brother, then joins Dean for a gig in Bosnia while Danijela spends the day gossiping with a friend.
8	8	"Episode 8"	21 February 2006
The family vacations in Sutivan, hosts Goran Kralj after fifteen years, watches Croatia vs Brazil, and Dino and Goran wander the island hungover.
9	9	"Episode 9"	28 February 2006
Dino struggles to prepare his Runjić song performance and uses Danijela’s giant cheat sheet before the family heads to Sutivan for his 41st birthday, where relatives share stories from the Dvornik past.
10	10	"Episode 10"	7 March 2006
After returning from summer break, Dino makes a deal with Ella to cover for each other while he prepares to sing a football anthem for Žanko, but the simple job turns into a nightmare.
11	11	"Episode 11"	14 March 2006
Dino travels to Sarajevo to retrieve an old music video and reconnects with friends while Ella films her first Television report.
12	12	"Episode 12"	21 March 2006
Dino returns from Sarajevo and, after arguing with Danijela about bathing their dog, ends up alone with Ella while Danijela goes to the spa, leading to a chaotic night with Bane and a trashed apartment just before her return.
13	13	"Episode 13"	28 March 2006
Dino returns home after visiting the Big Brother house, while Ella films a small role in Zabranjena ljubav and Danijela becomes the family’s unexpected media star.
14	14	"Episode 14"	4 April 2006
Danijela prepares a book from her blog while hosting Višnja from San Francisco, and the family spends a day on Medvednica where Dino takes his first ski lesson. They later appear on the talk-show series Sanja, where Ella struggles with intrusive questions, and the others reminisce about the turbulent Dvornik family past.
15	15	"Episode 15"	11 April 2006
The family looks back on their relationships through interviews and unseen footage, revealing how their chaotic dynamics shaped them. Dino and Danijela revisit past struggles, Ella shares her view of growing up in the spotlight, and Dino premieres a new music video made during filming.

=== Season 2 (2006–07) ===
No. overall	No. in season	Title	Original release date
16	1	"Episode 1"	26 December 2006
17	2	"Episode 2"	2 January 2007
18	3	"Episode 3"	9 January 2007
Dino and Danijela travel to Trogir so he can try quitting cigarettes through hypnosis, while Ella enjoys having the house to herself. Dino later roams Split with friends, gets a new concert look at Brico’s salon, and Danijela visits her grandmother.
19	4	"Episode 4"	16 January 2007
Dino battles insomnia while working on new music with Sima, Ella prepares for her physics retake and opens up about her love life to Danijela, and the family braces to meet the boy who left her a hickey.
20	5	"Episode 5"	23 January 2007
Ella faces her physics retake while Danijela undergoes liposuction, leaving Dino to wait for Ella’s results and then handle the household alone during Danijela’s recovery.
21	6	"Episode 6"	30 January 2007
Danijela recovers from liposuction while Dino escapes the noisy apartment for a gig in Opatija, where he reunites with people tied to a violent 1990s nightclub incident, as Ella tries to convince her parents to buy her a scooter.
22	7	"Episode 7"	6 February 2007
Dino, exhausted from concerts, is taken by Danijela to an ayurvedic detox therapy that restores his energy, after which he surprises Ella with a balloon‑ride outing.
23	8	"Episode 8"	13 February 2007
Dino and Danijela visit Rajko Dujmić and his wife in Gorski kotar.
24	9	"Episode 9"	20 February 2007
The family vacations in Sutivan, where Ella rejects local traditions, Dino prepares to sing at the village feast and clashes with Sablja, and all three join a diving adventure that pushes Dino to confront his fear of the sea.
25	10	"Episode 10"	27 February 2007
Dino celebrates his birthday in Sutivan with the summer crew until old rival Roko shows up, and after returning to Zagreb the family prepares Ella for school while Dino revisits Roko’s studio and slips into a surreal nostalgia trip.
26	11	"Episode 11"	6 March 2007
Dino faces mounting stress from a new court hearing, abandons work on his album, and hosts Tony Cetinski and Ivana Nobilo for support, leading to a surprise phone‑call reconciliation with Gibonni while Danijela battles bills at home.
27	12	"Episode 12"	13 March 2007
Dino buys a handmade drum as a gift for Edo Maajka's new bar while Danijela commissions a family portrait from Roko and Ella films a pilot in Split.
