= Galerija Tutnplok =

Studio album by The Beat Fleet
- Released: 2 November 2007
- Genre: Rap rock
- Language: Croatian
- Label: Menart Records
- Producer: Dragan Lukić Lvky

The Beat Fleet chronology
Maxon Universal (2004)	Galerija Tutnplok (2007)	Perpetuum Fritule (2010)

Galerija Tutnplok is the fourth studio album by the Croatian hip hop / rap rock band The Beat Fleet. The album was released in November 2007.

Galerija Tutnplok won three Porin Awards in 2008, including Album of the Year.

== Track listing ==
1. "Ne znan šta bi reka"
2. "Obnova"
3. "Budite kao mi"
4. "Lud za njom"
5. "Fantastična"
6. "Đita"
7. "Baze lete"
8. "Nema nikoga doma"
9. "Crogito ergo sum"
10. "Data"
11. "Smak svita"
12. "Intropatija"
