= Oliver Dragojević =

Croatian singer (1947–2018)

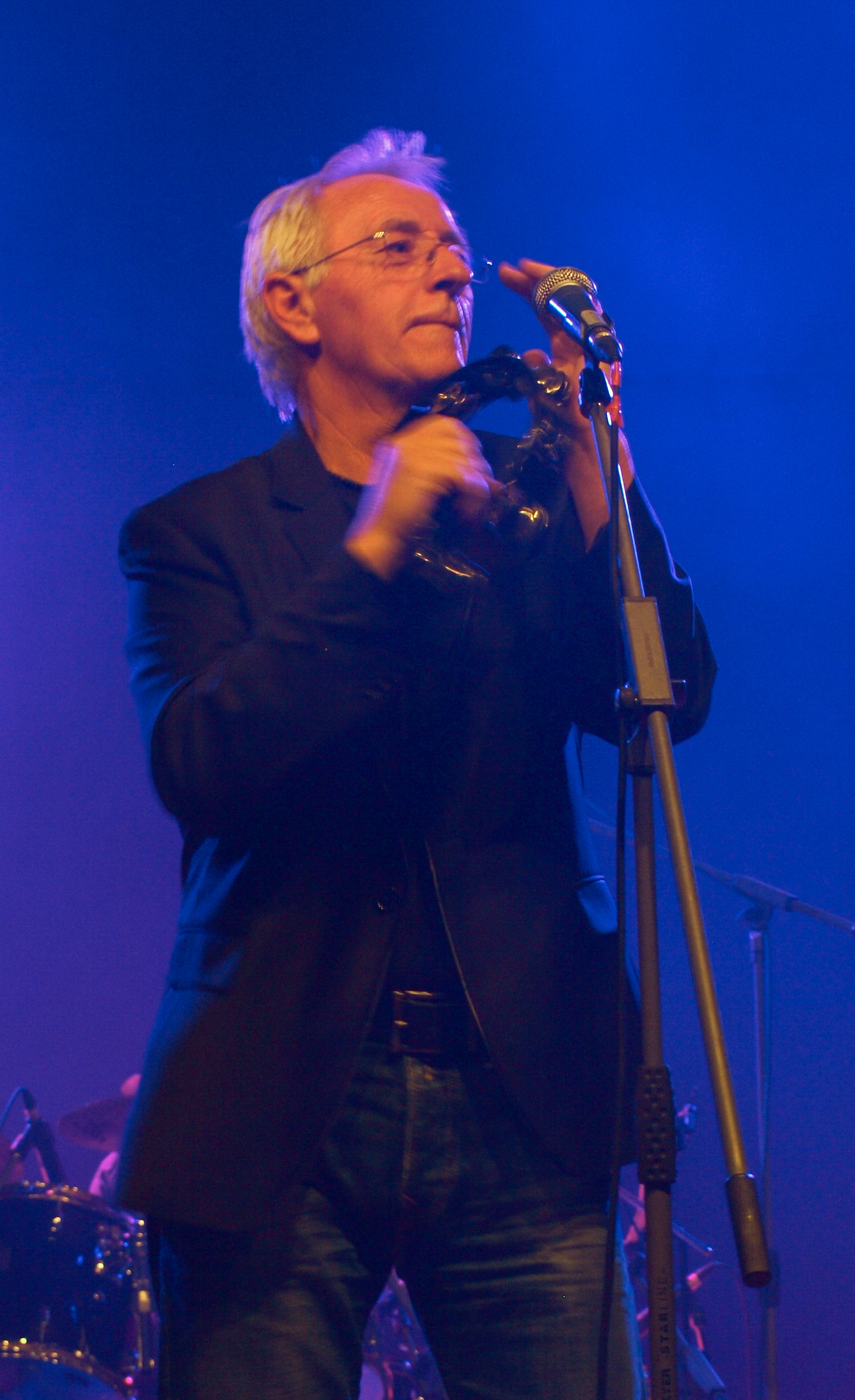
- Dragojević in 2010
- Born: 7 December 1947; Split, PR Croatia, FPR Yugoslavia
- Died: 29 July 2018 (aged 70); Split, Croatia
- Occupation: Singer-songwriter
- Years active: 1974–2018
- Spouse: Vesna Dragojević (m. 1974)
- Children: 3
- Musical career
- Genres: Klapa; pop; jazz; blues
- Instruments: Vocals; piano; guitar; accordion
- Labels: Jugoton; Croatia Records; Diskoton; HRT Orfej; Aquarius Records; Hi-Fi Centar
- Formerly of: Batali; Dubrovački trubaduri; More
- Website: oliver.hr

Oliver Dragojević (pronounced [ǒliʋer drâɡojeʋitɕ]; 7 December 1947 – 29 July 2018) was a Croatian singer and composer, who was considered one of the most enduring musical stars and cultural icons in Croatia with a discography that spanned nearly five decades. His style blended traditional klapa melodies of Dalmatia, a coastal region in his native Croatia, with jazz motifs wrapped up in a modern production.

For his influential musical career, he reached critical and commercial acclaim in Croatia and neighbouring countries, and numerous accolades, including numerous Porin and Indexi awards. He is one of the few Croatian musicians who performed at major international venues such as Carnegie Hall, Royal Albert Hall, L'Olympia, and Sydney Opera House.

Due to his popularity in Croatian music and his impact on Dalmatian music, he is often regarded as the "greatest musician in Croatian history", and his music videos on YouTube have accumulated more than 700 million views. In 1995, he was awarded the Order of Danica Hrvatska for his services to culture.

== Early life ==
Oliver's mother Kata (1907–1994) and father Marko Dragojević (1908–1991) had three daughters, all of whom died young during World War II. His family escaped to a refugee camp in El Shatt, Egypt, together with many other women and children from Dalmatia.

Dragojević was born on 7 December 1947 in Split, not long after his family returned to their ancestral town of Vela Luka, on the Dalmatian island of Korčula. He had an older brother Aljoša (1946–2011). When Oliver was five, his father bought each of his sons a harmonica. Oliver mastered the instrument quickly, and entertained other kids on his street, as well as passengers on board of ships on the busy route of Vela Luka–Split. As Dragojević showed a strong passion for music, his parents decided to enroll him in a music school in his hometown. There he learned to play the piano, clarinet and bass guitar.

== Music career ==
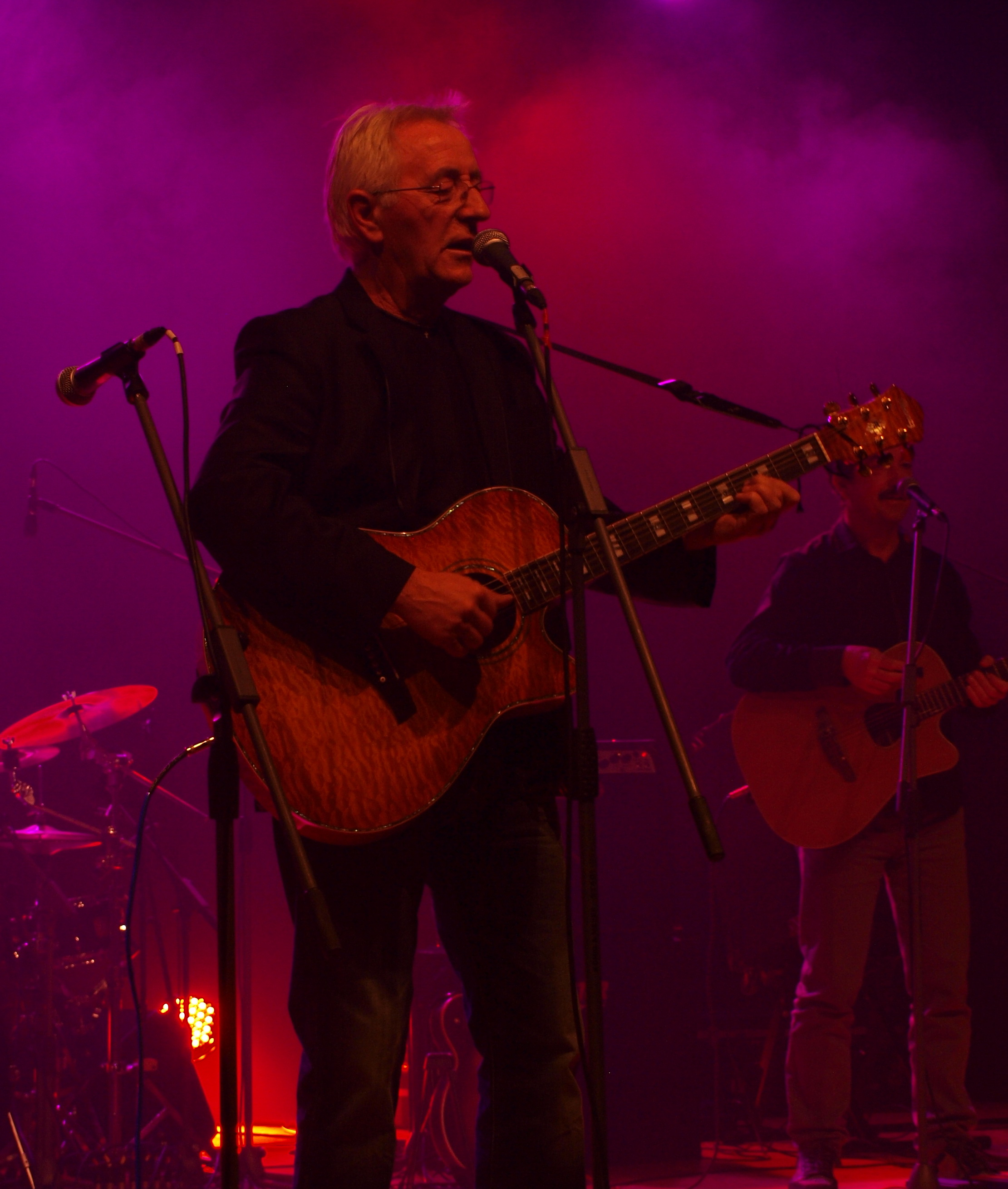
Dragojević performing live in Slavonski Brod, 10 December 2010

Dragojević's first performance was at the Split Children's Festival in 1961 with the song "Baloni" (Balloons). In a competition of amateur singers, his cult band from Split, Batali, won the first place for their rendition of "Yesterday", a Beatles classic. In 1972, Dragojević went abroad to further develop his craft. He played in clubs across Germany, Sweden and Mexico. His solo singing career began in 1974 at the Split Festival, where he won with the song "Ča će mi Copacabana" (What Do I Need Copacabana For).

A year later, composer Zdenko Runjić and Dragojević, released the song "Galeb i ja" (Seagull and I); it proved to be a big hit across the former Yugoslavia and made Dragojević a household name. That was followed by hits "Romanca" (Romance), "Oprosti mi, pape" (Forgive Me, Father), "Stari morski vuk" (An Old Sea Wolf). Runjić would further collaborate with Dragojević on further 200 songs, until Runjić's death. Between 1975 and 1980, the Dragojević/Runjić duo dominated the music scene of the former Yugoslavia. Part of the secret of their success was a third contributor, Jakša Fiamengo, who wrote the lyrics to some of Dragojević's most iconic songs, namely: "Nadalina", "Piva klapa ispo' volta" (The Klapa Sings Under the Vault), "Karoca" (Carriage), "Ništa nova" (Nothing New), "Infiša san u te" (I Am Crazy About You), and "Ostavljam te samu" (I Leave You Alone). In 1990 Dragojević won the Split Festival with "Ti si moj san" (You Are My Dream), and the Jugovizija Jamboree with the song "Sreća je tamo gdje si ti" (Happiness is Where You Are), both collaboration with Zorica Kondža.

Most of Dragojević's songs are considered evergreen on the Balkans. Dubbed "the Cosmic Dalmatian" Dragojević was widely lauded and remembered for his emotionally intense ballads and equally candide performances. These include "Vjerujem u anđele" (I Believe in Angels), "Kad mi dođeš ti" (When You Come to Me), "La Musica di Notte" (covered also by the Dubrovački Trubaduri), "Bez tebe" (Without You), "Pred tvojim vratima" (transl. "In Front of Your Door", released 24 November 2002 on Trag u beskraju), "Cesarica" (from the album Melodije Hrvatskog Jadrana '93, released 15 July 1993), "Pismo moja" (My Song) and "Vjeruj u ljubav" (Believe in Love) (from the same-named album, released 1 January 1979 and as a rendition on 15 June 2009).

Dragojević participated five times in national selection for the Eurovision Song Contest. He made his debut in the Jugovizija 1988 with hopes to represent Yugoslavia performing "Dženi", which finished second. He returned to the contest again in 1990 with Zorica Kondža performing "Sreća je tamo gdje si ti" (Happiness is Where You Are) and finishing third. After the breakup of Yugoslavia, Dragojević participated in the Dora 1994 with hopes to represent Croatia, with "Arja". The song ended up in fourth place. He participated in the Dora 1995 again with "Boginja" (Goddess), finishing second, and in the Dora 1997 with "Lucija", finishing eight.

For his album made with long-term collaborator Zlatan Stipišić Gibonni, Familija (Family), they were awarded a Porin Award for Album of the Year in 2017.

== Personal life ==
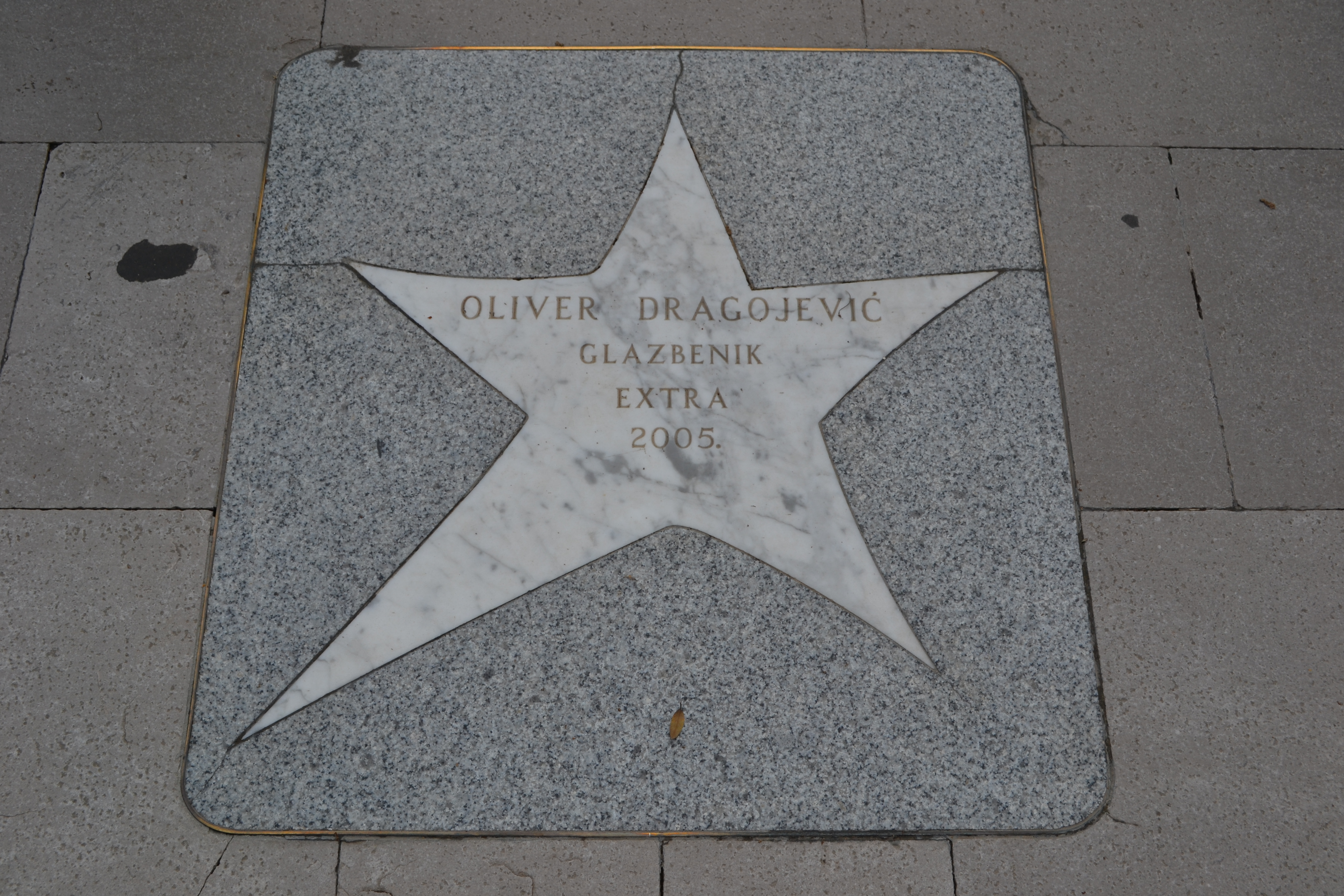
Dragojević’s star on the Croatian walk of Fame in Opatija

=== Family ===
Dragojević married his wife Vesna in 1974, with whom he had three sons: Dino (b. 1975), and twins Damir and Davor (b. 1978). He had five grandchildren.

=== Death ===
In August 2017, Dragojević revealed he was diagnosed with lung cancer. In June 2018, he was hospitalised in the Split Clinical Hospital Center due to breathing difficulties, where on 29 July 2018 at 2:00 am, Dragojević died after succumbing to a year-long battle with the disease. He was 70.

The Croatian Government declared 31 July as the National Day of Condolences to honour him. The same day, over 10,000 people on Split waterfront terraced the coffin with his body to the catamaran for Vela Luka. Dragojević was buried at the cemetery of St. Roko in Vela Luka on 1 August.

== Discography ==
=== Studio albums ===
- Ljubavna pjesma (1975)
- Malinkolija (1977)
- Poeta (1978)
- Vjeruj u ljubav (1979)
- Đelozija (1981)
- Jubavi, jubavi (1981)
- Karoca (1982)
- Evo mene među moje (1984)
- Svoju zvizdu slidin (1985)
- Za sva vrimena (with Zdenko Runjić; 1986)
- Oliver (1987)
- Pionirsko kolo (with Zvjezdice; 1987)
- Svirajte noćas za moju dušu (1988)
- Jedina (1990)
- Teško mi je putovati (1992)
- Neka nova svitanja (1994)
- Vrime (1995)
- Duša mi je more (1997)
- Dvi, tri riči (2000)
- Trag u beskraju (2002)
- Vridilo je (2005)
- Samo da je tu (2010)
- Noć nek' tiho svira (with Stjepan Hauser; 2011)
- Tišina mora (2013)
- Familija (with Gibonni; 2016)
- Dolaziš (2025)

=== Live albums ===
- Oliver u HNK (1989)
- Oliver u Lisinskom (1996)
- Oliver u Areni (2001)
- Live Zadar 2002 (with Klapa Intrade; 2002)
- Oliver à l'Olympia (2006)
- Momenti (with Alan Bjelinski and Ante Gelo; 2009)

=== Compilation albums ===
- Oliver 5 (1980)
- Sve najbolje (1990)
- Vjeruj u ljubav (with friends; 2003)
- The Platinum Collection (2006)
- Kozmički Dalmatinac (2007)
- Najljepše ljubavne pjesme (2010)
- 100 originalnih pjesama (2013)
- The Best Of Collection (2015)
- Dueti (2017)
- Do kraja vrimena (2018)
- Kad mi dođeš ti (2019)
- 25 Greatest Hits (2024)

=== Box sets ===
- 100 (with Zdenko Runjić; 1998)
- Oliver 1 (2006)
- Oliver 2 (2006)
- Original Album Collection, Vol. 1 (2016)
- Original Album Collection, Vol. 2 (2016)
- Original Album Collection – Oliver Live (2019)

== See also ==
- Popular music in Croatia
