= Majke =

Croatian rock band

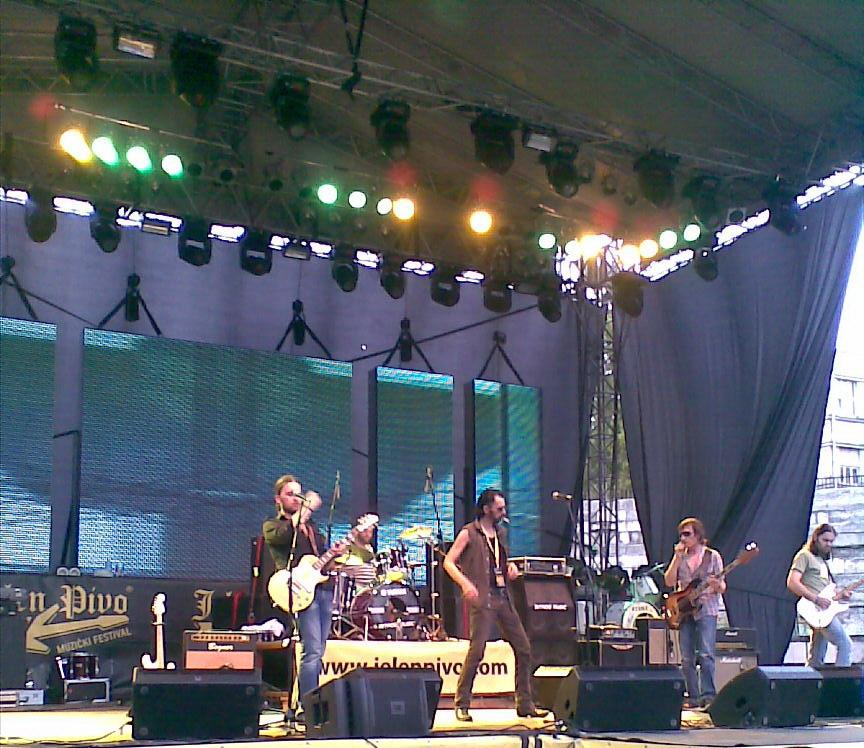
- Majke performing at the Jelen Pivo Live festival in Belgrade, in September 2008

Background information
- Origin: Vinkovci, Croatia
- Genres: Rock and roll, blues-rock, hard rock, garage rock
- Years active: 1984–1991, 1992–1995, 1995–2000, 2007–present
- Labels: Croatia Records, Jabukaton
- Members: Kruno Domaćinović guitar Davor Rodik pedal steel guitar Mario Rašić – bass guitar Alen Tibljaš – drums Moreno Pletikosić – Hammond & keyboards
- Past members: see list

Majke ("Mothers") are a cult Croatian rock band. Founded in 1984 in Vinkovci, Majke are one of the many bands to appear in a town that had a particularly vibrant rock and alternative scene. The band drew early inspiration from bands like: MC5, Flamin' Groovies, Steppenwolf, The Stooges, New York Dolls, Motörhead and many others.

== History ==
=== 1984-1989: Formation, early recordings and death of Marin Pokrovac ===
Majke were formed in 1984 in Vinkovci, Croatia by vocalist Goran Bare, bassist Nedjeljko Ivković - Kilmister, drummer Željko Mikulić - Korozija, and guitarists Marin Pokrovac and Ivica Duspara. They released their first demo tape in 1988 on the label Slušaj Najglasnije. The following year, some of their early recordings appeared on the legendary Slušaj Najglasnije compilation album "Bombardiranje New Yorka", which mainly consisted of recordings of rock bands from Vinkovci.

The band briefly broke up after Pokrovac moved to London. However, he soon returned to Vinkovci, and the band reformed. The reunion was tragically cut short after Pokrovac's death in 1989 when he crashed his car into the Bosut river while returning from rehearsal. Two friends of the band, Pavo Pap and Goran Matošević - Bratanac, died in the crash as well.

=== 1990-1991: Razum I Bezumlje and first major breakup ===
The band decided to continue without Pokrovac. They recruited new guitarist Ivan Dujmić, and in 1990, they released their first studio album, "Razum I Bezumlje", on the independent label Search & Enjoy. The album displayed a raw and aggressive punk-influenced garage rock style, and featured several live staples such as "Iz Sve Snage", "Zbunjen I Ošamućen", "Lutak Iskrivljenog Lica", "Nikada Te Neću Zaboraviti" and "Putujem". Bare wrote the lyrics, while Duspara wrote all of the music on the album. The album was proclaimed rock album of the year by domestic audiences. However, the band's success was suddenly interrupted by the start of the Croatian War of Independence, with Vinkovci being one of the frontlines. The band soon broke up.

=== 1992-1993: Reformation and Razdor ===
Bare relocated to Zagreb in 1992 and assembled a new Majke lineup consisting of original drummer Korozija, guitarist and primary songwriter Zoran Čalić, and bassist Jurica Nižić. The band recorded their second studio album "Razdor" in 1993, which was released on T.R.I.P., a sub-label of Croatia Records. The album contained popular songs such as "Budi Ponosan", "Krvarim Od Dosade", "Mršavi Pas", "'89" and "Fantastična Vatra".

=== 1993-1994: Lineup changes and Milost ===
In late 1993, original bassist Kilmister returned to the band, and second guitarist Goran Dujmić joined. The band released their third studio album "Milost" the following year, on the label Heroina Nova. Despite Bare considering it to be one of Majke's weaker albums, the song "Ja sam budućnost" became a hit and a music video was filmed for it. Deceased guitarist Marin Pokrovac received a posthumous writing credit for the song "Postoji Nešto", while original guitarist Ivica Duspara received a writing credit for "Zauvijek". Dujmić also received writing credits for "Znam ono što treba da znam" and "Oslobodi se". That same year, after the birth of his son, Bare checked into rehab for heroin addiction and was clean by the summer of 1995.

=== 1995–1997: Temporary breakup, new members, Vrijeme Je Da Se Krene and Život Uživo ===
In 1995, the band briefly broke up, though Bare spent several months performing under the Majke moniker with members of Kojoti as his backing band. Around this time, Bare's wife died following a heroin overdose. Bare fell into a deep depression and started using heroin again as well as drinking heavily to cope with his wife's death.

Late that year, the band reformed with a new lineup: Bare on vocals, Kilmister on bass, Čalić and Kruno Domaćinović on guitars, and Tihomir Jalšovec - Chaka on drums. The band released "Vrijeme Je Da Se Krene", their fourth and most commercially successful studio album, on Jabukaton records in 1996. Originally intended to be an EP, this album displayed a softer blues rock sound compared to their old, more aggressive garage rock style. The album had a much more sorrowful feel to it as the band was going through difficult times while recording the album, with Bare dealing with his wife's death, depression and addiction, as well as Kilmister's father dying in the middle of recording. The band utilized session musicians Davor Rodik and Gojko Tomljanović to play pedal steel guitar and keyboards respectively. The album contained several hits, the most famous being "Mene ne zanima", "Odvedi me" and "A ti još plačeš". A music video was filmed for Mene ne zanima, which won a Porin award. The title track and "Baretov Blues" became live staples as well, while original guitarist Ivica Duspara received a writing credit for "Nije lako".

In 1997, the band released their first live album "Život Uživo", recorded at the concert venue Dom Sportova on 25 April of that year. The following year, the band won two Crni Mačak awards for best rock artist and best live performance.

=== 1998-2000: Put do Srca Sunca, lineup changes and second major breakup ===
In 1998, the band filmed a music video for a new song called "Daj mi", announcing a new studio album. The band's fifth studio album, "Put Do Srca Sunca", was released later that year. The album displayed a more complex and experimental style, with some songs featuring a pedal steel guitar, a Hammond organ, congas, and even a horn section. The album contained the hit single "Grešnik", for which a music video was filmed.

A few months after the album's release, Chaka left the band and was replaced by Thomas Balaž, who previously played in the band Anesthesia. The live album Život Uživo won a Porin award for best alternative rock album. Shortly after the Porin awards, guitarist Zoran Čalić left the band, later citing Bare's alcohol and drug abuse as one of the main reasons for his departure. The next year, Put Do Srca Sunca won a Crni Mačak award for the best cover art.

Near the end of 1999, the band recorded a new version of the song "Budi Ponosan" from their second studio album, "Razdor", to mark the band's 15th anniversary. Around this time, Bare checked into rehab for heroin addiction again, and was clean by the following year.

In the spring of 2000, the band announced that they were breaking up once again. However, they still played several shows throughout the summer due to contractual obligations. They played their final show at Bike October Fest on 30 September 2000.

After the breakup, Bare embarked on a successful solo career, releasing his first album, "Izgubljen I Nađen", in 2001, recorded with his backing band Plaćenici. Meanwhile, Čalić and Kilmister formed the band Elektrobuda, releasing an album titled "Sveti Zvuk" in 2005.

=== 2007-2008: Reunion and Majke Unplugged ===
In 2007, after seven years of inactivity, most of the "Vrijeme Je Da Se Krene" lineup reunited under the moniker Goran Bare & Majke, with ex-Laufer drummer Alen Tibljaš. Tibljaš had also previously played with Bare in his backing band, Plaćenici. The band also recruited a keyboardist, Danko Krznarić of Cota G4. They played their first show since 2000 at the famous venue Tvornica Kulture in Zagreb on 8 March, which was recorded for a live album that would not be released until 2013.

Krznarić soon left the band and was replaced by Parni Valjak keyboardist Berislav Blažević, who previously worked with Bare during his solo career, and also played keyboards on the band's 1999 re-recording of Budi Ponosan. On 12 April 2008, the band played a well received acoustic show at Tvornica Kulture, which was recorded and released as the live album "Majke Unplugged". The band continued performing live around the country, and began talks of recording a new studio album.

=== 2009-2013: Lineup changes, Teške Boje ===
By the end of 2009, Kilmister, Domaćinović, Tibljaš and Blažević left the band due to personal differences with Bare. This left Bare as the only remaining original member of Majke. He and Čalić assembled a new lineup consisting of bassist Mario Rašić, who previously played with Bare in his backing band Plaćenici; Gatuzo guitarist Damir Trkulja - Šiljo, drummer Damir Šomen and keyboardist Viktor Lipić. This lineup recorded the band's sixth studio album, "Teške Boje", which was released in 2011. On this album, the band displayed a much darker and more aggressive style of blues rock, with psychedelic elements mixed in as well. The title track was a hit, with some critics even calling it the "best Croatian rock song of the last 20 years", and a music video was filmed for it. Other staples from the album included "Pozovi Me U Noć" and "Depresija". In 2012, the album won several Porin awards for song of the year, best rock album, and best music video of the year. Soon afterwards, Šiljo left the band due to personal differences with Bare and was replaced by ex-Pips, Chips i Videoclips guitarist Alen Kraljić, who also played with Bare as a member of Plaćenici.

In 2013, the band released the live album "Majke U Tvornici", which was recorded six years ago at the Tvornica Kulture venue. By the end of the year, Zoran Čalić left the band once again. He went on to form a new band called Zoran Čalić Bend. Meanwhile, Bare would keep Majke going, and the band would spend the next few years going through various personnel changes until finally assembling a stable lineup once again. At one point, the band featured two members of Kojoti; bassist Vanja Marin and keyboardist Dan Divjak, who died in 2017.

=== Modern Era, Lineup changes and Nuspojave (2015–present) ===
By 2015, after years of lineup changes, Bare finally assembled a stable lineup of the band once again. Guitarist Kruno Domaćinović returned to the band, along with the drummer Alen Tibljaš, keyboardist Berislav Blažević, Bassist Mario Rašić and longtime collaborator and pedal steel guitarist Davor Rodik. On 28 December 2016, the "Vrijeme Je Da Se Krene" lineup briefly reunited at the cult Zagreb alternative nightclub "Jabuka" to promote the remastered version of that album. It was the first time Bare and Kilmister spoke since 2009, as well as former drummer Chaka's first public appearance since his departure from the band in 1998.

In April 2018, the band released their seventh studio album, Nuspojave ("Side Effects"), via Croatia Records. Co-written and heavily arranged by bassist Mario Rašić, the album marked a significant stylistic departure from the straight garage blues-rock of their previous records. Nuspojave introduced a slower, hypnotic, and darker sonic palette heavily influenced by krautrock and psychedelic blues. Long-form compositions like the 9-minute opening track "Ljubav krvari" and the single "Osvijesti me" received widespread critical acclaim, sweeping regional music awards and establishing a new creative direction for the band. During this period, the band transitioned into a premier arena act across the region. On November 12, 2022, they performed a major sold-out concert at Zagreb’s Dom Sportova. The performance was multi-tracked and subsequently released by Croatia Records in April 2023 as a deluxe live double-album and Blu-ray package titled Live at Dom Sportova.Following this success, the group reached a major live milestone on December 22, 2023, by selling out the massive Arena Zagreb. The concert drew a multigenerational crowd of 16 thousands, successfully integrating the moody soundscapes of "Nuspojave" with core anthems like "Budi ponosan", "Vrijeme je da se krene" and "Teške boje". The event was widely captured by critics as a triumphant high-point of domestic rock music in the venue. On April 28, 2024, the band expanded their international reach by performing a highly publicized club show at the historic venue Dingwalls in Camden Town, London. This concert was later mixed and released on vinyl under the title Live in London, 28.4.2024.

=== New album and arena successes (2025–present) ===
Following a seven-year studio recording hiatus, the group announced sessions for their eighth studio album under the working title Potop ("Deluge"). In late 2025, they released the lead single "Moja jedina,". The accompanying tour circuit saw the group sell out consecutive theater and club dates across the former Yugoslavia, including performances at Zagreb's Boogaloo and Boćarski Dom. Throughout the summer of 2026, the band headlined major regional outdoor events, including the 59th Gitarijada u Zaječaru, Arsenal Fest, Ljubljana and a concert at Pula's Kaštel. On September 5, 2026, Goran Bare & Majke performed a massive standalone headline show at the open-air Šalata Stadium in Zagreb, marking their largest outdoor performance in the capital city since 2018. Unprecedented lineup stability historically known for frequent and abrupt personnel changes, the era since 2015 marks the most stable period in the band's four-decade history.

On 21 September 2026, the band ended a concert in Makarska early due to Goran Bare's health issues preventing him from completing the first song. Bare died on 9 October 2026, at the age of 61.

== Discography ==
=== Studio albums ===
- Razum i bezumlje (1990)
- Razdor (1993)
- Milost (1994)
- Vrijeme je da se krene (1996)
- Put do srca sunca (1998)
- Teške boje (2011)
- Nuspojave (2018)

=== Live albums ===
- Život uživo (1997)
- Unplugged (2008)
- U Tvornici (2013) – recorded in 2007
- Live At Dom Sportova, Zagreb 12.11.2022. (2023)
- Live In London 28.4.2024, Dingwalls Camden (2024)

== Members ==
=== Current members ===
- Kruno Domaćinović – lead guitar (1994-2000, 2007-2010, 2014-present)
- Davor Rodik – pedal steel, guitar (1996-1999, 2014-present)
- Mario Rašić – bass (2010-2015, 2017-present)
- Alen Tibljaš – drums (2007-2010, 2015-present)
- Moreno Pletikosić – Hammond & keyboards (2025-present)

=== Former members ===
- Goran Bare – lead vocals (1984-2000, 2007-2026; died 2026)
- Gojko Tomljanović - keyboards (2023-2025)
- Dan Divjak - keyboards (2015-2017)
- Viktor Lipić - keyboards (2010-2014)
- Damir Šomen - drums (2010-2014)
- Zoran Čalić - guitar (1992-1999, 2007-2013)
- Damir Trkulja - guitar (2010-2013)
- Berislav Blažević - keyboards (1998-2000, 2007-2010)
- Nedjeljko Ivković - Kilmister - bass (1984-1990, 1994-2000, 2007-2010)
- Thomas Balaž - drums (1999-2000)
- Tihomir Jalšovec - Chaka - drums (1995-1999)
- Goran Dujmić - guitar (1984-1987, 1993-1994)
- Željko Mikulić - Korozija – drums, percussion (1984-1994)
- Jurica Nižić - bass (1992-1993)
- Ivica Duspara - guitar (1984-1990)
- Ivan Dujmić - guitar (1989-1990)
- Marin Pokrovac - guitar (1984-1989; deceased)
- Davor Viduka – guitars
- Vanja Marin – bass
- Mario Anušić – drums

== Awards and accolades ==
=== Porin Awards ===
The band has won a total of 16 Porin Awards across multiple categories throughout their career:

- 1997
  - Best Music Video – "Mene ne zanima" (directed by Radislav Jovanov - Gonzo)
- 1998
  - Best Alternative Rock Album – Život uživo
- 2009
  - Best Rock Album – Unplugged
  - Best Vocal Performance by a Group – "A ti još plačeš"
- 2012
  - Song of the Year – "Teške boje"
  - Hit of the Year – "Teške boje"
  - Best Rock Album – Teške boje
  - Best Vocal Performance by a Group – "Teške boje"
  - Best Arrangement – "Teške boje" (arranged by Goran Bare and Damir Trkulja - Šiljo)
  - Best Music Video – "Teške boje" (directed by Žare Batinović)
- 2014
  - Best Concert Album – Majke u Tvornici
  - Best Video Program – Majke u Tvornici
- 2019
  - Best Rock Album – Nuspojave
- 2021
  - Best Vocal Performance by a Group – "Rođen za suze"
- 2024
  - Best Vocal Performance by a Group – "Budi ponosan (live)" (from Live at Dom Sportova)
- 2025
  - Best Concert Album – Live in London
  - Best Vocal Performance by a Group – "Noćas prelazim rijeku"

=== Rock&Off Awards ===
The band has won the following independent music journalism Rock&Off awards:

- 2021
  - Iskon Public Choice Award – Goran Bare & Majke
- 2026
  - Song of the Year – "Moja jedina"

=== Crni mačak Awards ===
During the late 1990s and early 2000s, the band and frontman Goran Bare won multiple categories at the prominent journalists' rock award Crni mačak:

- 1998
  - Best Rock Artist – Majke
  - Best Live Performance – Majke
- 1999
  - Best Album Cover Design – Put do srca sunca (designed by studio "Božesačuvaj")
- 2002
  - Song of the Year – "Put ka sreći" (Goran Bare i Plaćenici)

=== Other Accolades ===
- Splitski festival (2000)
  - Grand Prix / First Audience Prize – "Put ka sreći" (Goran Bare i Plaćenici)
