= ZAA =

ZAA may refer to:

- Zoo and Aquarium Association
- Zoological Association of America
- ZAA, a band previously fronted by Sanja Vučić

Zaa is the name of:

- Charlie Zaa (* 1974), Colombian singer
