= Maxon Universal =

Studio album by The Beat Fleet
- Released: 30 July 2004
- Genre: Rap rock
- Language: Croatian
- Label: Menart Records
- Producer: Dragan Lukić Lvky

The Beat Fleet chronology
Uskladimo toplomjere (2000)	Maxon Universal (2004)	Galerija Tutnplok (2007)

Maxon Universal is the third studio album by the Croatian hip hop / rap rock band The Beat Fleet. The album was released in July 2004.

The album was met with critical acclaim, and it won five Porin Awards in 2005, including Best Rock Album and Song of the Year (for "Nostalgična"). In a 2011 critics' poll compiled by tportal.hr, Maxon Universal was voted top Croatian album of the decade.

== Track listing ==
1. "E-721"
2. "UV zrake"
3. "Papilova"
4. "Guzice i sise"
5. "Šareni artikal"
6. "Nostalgična"
7. "Tobogan"
8. "Heroyix"
9. "Bog i zemljani"
10. "Esej"
11. "Alles gut"
12. "Masovna hipnoza"
