= Pistaccio Metallic =

Studio album by The Beat Fleet
- Released: July 2, 2011
- Recorded: 2011
- Studio: Studio RSL, Novo Mesto
- Genre: Rap rock
- Language: Croatian
- Label: Dallas Records
- Producer: The Beat Fleet

The Beat Fleet chronology
Perpetuum Fritule (2010)	Pistaccio Metallic (2011)	Danas sutra (2015)

Pistaccio Metallic is the fifth album by Croatian band The Beat Fleet (TBF), released in 2011. The album was announced in late May with the release of the lead single "Mater". The album has sold more than 50,000 copies in the Balkans.

== Background ==
Unlike previous studio albums by TBF, Pistaccio Metallic was released under Dallas Records. It is also the first studio album that features new drummer Janko Novoselić. He also played on their 2010 live album Perpetuum Fritule. For the first time TBF recorded a studio album outside their hometown Split. The album was recorded in Novo Mesto, Slovenia at the RSL Studio. It is also the first time TBF produced a studio album by themselves without an external producer. The album got its name from the band's inside joke about the color of the guitar - however, Badovinac claimed in an interview that TBF always creates "wacky" album name, which are often nonsensical.

== Track listing ==
1. Tragični Junak
2. San
3. Spin Doktor
4. Uvik Kontra
5. Mater
6. Grad Spava
7. Vrag (Dobar Dan Profesore Voland)
8. Dalmatino
9. Veseljko
10. Pozitivan Stav
11. Uspavanka

== Sources ==
- Muzika.hr - U prodaji "Pistaccio Metallic" TBF-a
- Novi singl TBF-a – Vijesti — MTV Hrvatska
