= Porin (music award) =

Croatian music award

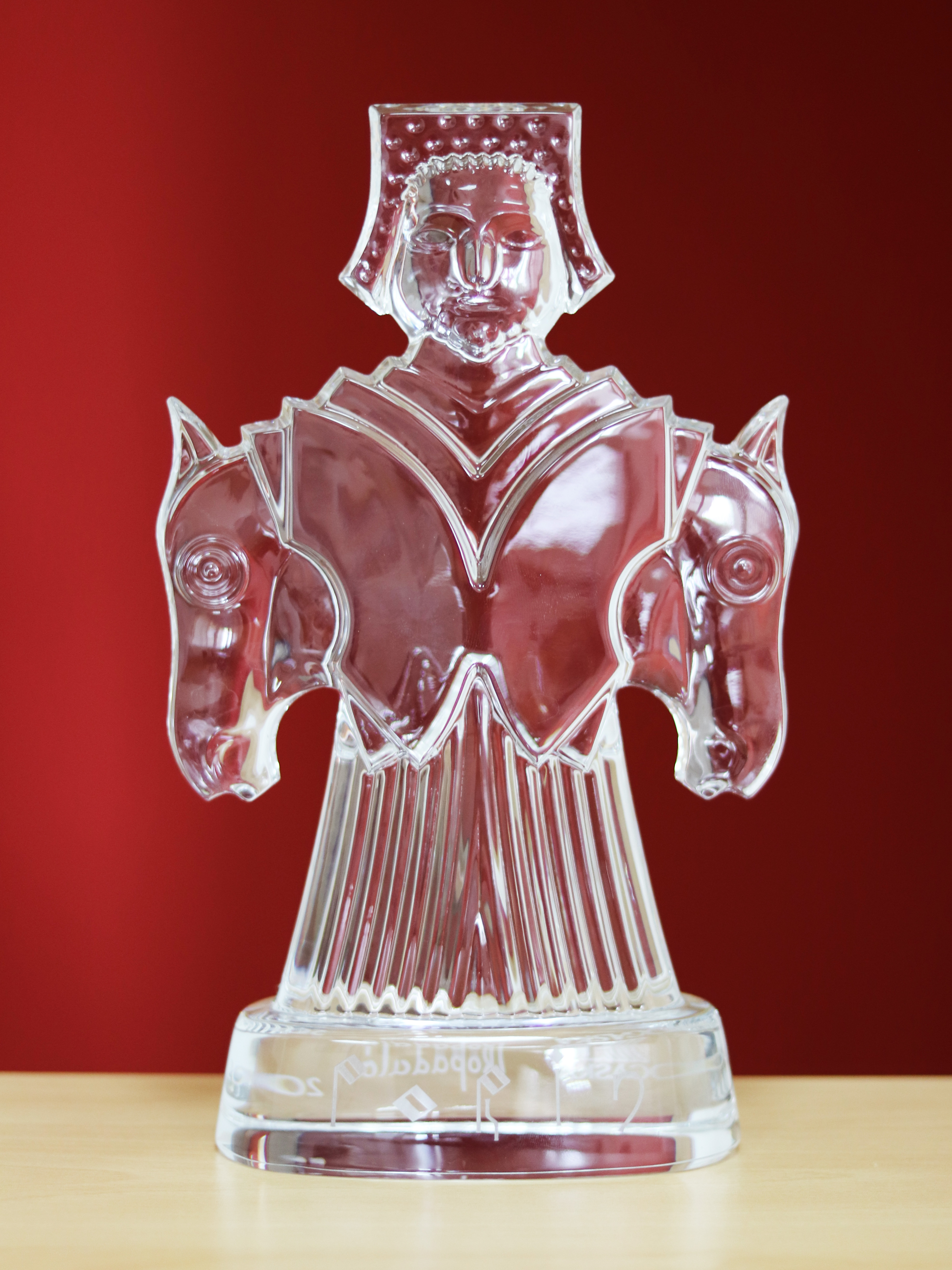
The Porin Award Statuette

Porin is the main Croatian music award founded by the Croatian Phonographic Association, Croatian Musicians Union, Croatian Radiotelevision and Croatian Composers' Society in Split, Croatia.

== Special awards ==
=== Lifetime Achievement Award ===
The following individuals have received Lifetime Achievement Awards, listed by year.

Year	Recipient
1994	Anton Marti, Zagreb Soloists
1995	Kvartet 4M, Miljenko Prohaska
1996	Đorđe Novković
1997	Ivo Pogorelić, Ivo Robić
1998	Milko Kelemen, Zdenko Runjić
1999	Arsen Dedić, Dunja Vejzović
2000	Pero Gotovac, Vice Vukov, Zagreb String Quartet
2001	Nikica Kalogjera, Vladimir Krpan
2002	Anđelko Klobučar, LADO Folk Dance Ensemble, Siniša Škarica
2003	Boško Petrović, Ruža Pospiš-Baldani, Dražen Vrdoljak
2004	Emil Cossetto, Alfi Kabiljo, Nenad Turkalj
2005	Milan Horvat, Branko Mihaljević, Drago Mlinarec, Božo Potočnik
2006	Drago Britvić, Tomislav Neralić, Gabi Novak, Ljubo Stipišić-Delmata
2007	Đelo Jusić, Dubravko Detoni, Croatia Records
2008	Nikša Bareza, Zvonko Spišić
2009	Ljubo Kuntarić, Tereza Kesovija, Miroslav Miletić, Dino Dvornik
2010	Pavle Dešpalj, Mato Došen, Darko Glavan, Stipica Kalogjera, Vojno Kundić, Julije Njikoš, Vjekoslav Šutej
2011	Josip Klima, Drago Diklić
2012	Mišo Kovač, Stjepan Mihaljinec, Time
2013	Vladimir Kranjčević, Stanko Selak, Rajko Dujmić, Stjepan Jimmy Stanić, Veljko Despot, Anđela Potočnik, Dražen Boić
2014	Miroslav Križić, Vinko Coce, Krešimir Oblak, Dubravko Majnarić, Radojka Šverko, Valter Dešpalj, Željko Brkanović
2015	Nikša Gligo, Frano Parać
2016	Hrvoje Hegedušić, Davorin Kempf
2017	Zrinko Tutić, Zoran Juranić, klapa Lučica
2018	Pavica Gvozdić, Oliver Dragojević, Jakša Fiamengo
2019	Ibrica Jusić, Silvije Glojnarić, Paolo Sfeci
2020	Josipa Lisac, Tomislav Uhlik
2021	Zdenka Kovačiček, Krunoslav Slabinac, Silvio Foretić
2022	Vera Svoboda, Jura Stublić, Aki Rahimovski

== General categories ==
=== Album of the Year ===
Year	Performing artist(s)	Album	Label
1994	Prljavo Kazalište	Lupi petama...	CBS
1995	Parni Valjak	Buđenje	Croatia
1996	Parni Valjak	Bez struje: Live in ZeKaeM	Croatia
1997	Oliver Dragojević	Oliver u Lisinskom	Croatia
1998	Pips, Chips & Videoclips	Fred Astaire	Jabukaton
1999	Urban	Žena dijete	Croatia
2000	Gibonni	Judi, zviri i beštimje	Dallas
2001	Oliver Dragojević	Dvi, tri riči	Croatia
2002	Gibonni	Mirakul	Dallas
2003	Gabi Novak	Pjesma je moj život	Aquarius
2004	Nina Badrić	Ljubav	Aquarius
2005	Arsen Dedić	Na zlu putu	Croatia
2006	Oliver Dragojević	Vridilo je	Aquarius
2007	Gibonni	Unca fibre	Dallas
2008	The Beat Fleet	Galerija Tutnplok	Menart
2009	Dino Dvornik	Pandorina kutija	Dancing Bear
2010	Neno Belan & Fiumens	Tvornica snova	Dallas
2011	Gibonni	Toleranca	Dallas
2012	The Beat Fleet	Pistaccio Metallic	Dallas
2013	Mayales	2	Aquarius
2014	Oliver Dragojević	Tišina mora	Aquarius
2015	Psihomodo Pop	Ćiribu ćiriba	Dallas
2016	Matija Dedić	Matija svira Arsena	Croatia
2017	Oliver Dragojević & Gibonni	Familija	Aquarius
2018	Mia Dimšić	Život nije siv	Croatia
2019	Vojko V	Vojko	Croatia
2020	J. R. August	Dangerous Waters	Croatia
2021	Pavel	Ennui	Dallas
2022	Urban & 4	Lipanj, srpanj, kolovoz	Croatia

=== Song of the Year ===
Equivalent to the American Grammy Award for Record of the Year, awards in this category are given for a single song and presented to the artist who recorded it.

Year	Performing artist(s)	Song
1994	Oliver Dragojević	"Cesarica"
1995	Parni valjak	"Sve još miriše na nju"
1996	Tony Cetinski	"23. prosinac"
1997	Gibonni	"Ako me nosiš na duši"
1998	Darko Rundek	"Apokalipso"
1999	Marijan Ban & Giuliano	"Jugo"
2000	Gibonni	"Činim pravu stvar"
2001	Marijan Ban	"Ruzinavi brod"
2002	Gibonni	"Oprosti"
2003	Oliver Dragojević	"Sve bi da za nju"
2004	Nina Badrić	"Čarobno jutro"
2005	The Beat Fleet	"Nostalgična"
2006	Svadbas	"Treblebass"
2007	Gibonni	"Anđeo u tebi"
2008	Toše Proeski	"Igra bez granica"
2009	Massimo & Neno Belan	"Zar više nema nas"
2010	Nola	"Iznad oblaka"
2011	Lea Dekleva feat. The Beat Fleet	"Dogodila se ljubav..."
2012	Goran Bare & Majke	"Teške boje"
2013	Neno Belan & Fiumens feat. Ljetno kino	"Ulicama grada"
2014	Massimo	"Suze nam stale na put"
2015	Vatra	"Tango"
2016	Elemental	"Goli i bosi"
2017	Detour	"Zaljubila sam se"
2018	Mia Dimšić	"Bezimeni"
2019	Petar Grašo	"Ako te pitaju"
2020	Urban & 4	"Iskra"
2021	Massimo	"Mali krug velikih ljudi"
2022	Urban & 4	"Sama"

=== Best video ===
Year	Performing artist(s)	Video track
1994	Electro Team	"Tek je 12 sati"
1995	Electro Team	"Ne traži ljubav"
1996	Psihomodo Pop	"Starfucker"
1997	Majke	"Mene ne zanima"
1998	Darko Rundek	"Apokalipso"
1999	Urban & 4	"Black Tattoo"
2000	Hladno pivo	"Politika"
2001	Cubismo	"Ay mi Cuba"
2002	Gibonni	"Oprosti"
2003	Gibonni & Putokazi	"Libar"
2004	Hladno pivo	"Zimmer frei"
2005	Edo Maajka	"Pržiiii"
2006	Let 3	"Ero s onoga svijeta"
2007	Let 3	"Dijete u vremenu"
2008	The Beat Fleet	"Smak svita"
2009	Dino Dvornik	"Hipnotiziran"
2010	The Beat Fleet	"Data"
2011	Gibonni	"Žeđam"
2012	Goran Bare & Majke	"Teške boje"
2013	The Beat Fleet	"Grad spava"
2014	Psihomodo pop	"Donna"
2015	Psihomodo pop	"Bejbi"
2016	Rundek Cargo Trio	"Ima ih"
2017	Mia Dimšić	"Život nije siv"
2018	2Cellos	"Game of Thrones"
2019	Vojko V	"Ne može"
2020	Psihomodo Pop	"Digitalno nebo"
2021	J.R. August	"Dangerous Waters"
2022	Gibonni	"Lažu fotografije"

== Genre-specific awards ==
=== Best Club Album ===
This category was introduced in 2001 and was originally called Best hip-hop album. Between 2002 and 2009 it was called Best Urban and Club Music Album and in 2010 it was shortened to Best Club Music Album.

Year	Performing artist(s)	Album
2001	Bolesna braća	Lovci na šubare
2002	El Bahattee	Svaki pas ima svoj dan
2003	Cubismo	Junglesalsa
2004	The Bastardz	The Bastardz Go Jazzy Live
2005	Edo Maajka	No sikiriki
2006	Leut Magnetik	Leut Magnetik
2007	Putokazi	Androida Remixed
2008	Cubismo	Autobus Calypso
2009	Elemental	Pod pritiskom
2010	Tamara Obrovac & Transhistria Electric	Neću više jazz kantati
2011	Elemental	Vertigo
2012	The Beat Fleet	Pistaccio Metallic
2013	Postolar Tripper	Čujem ja netko šuti
2014	Elemental	U redu je
2016	The Beat Fleet	Danas sutra
2017	Elemental	Tijelo
2018	Kozmodrum	Gravity
2019	Vojko V	Vojko
2020	Tihomir Pop Asanović & Prijatelji	Povratak prvoj ljubavi / Return To The First Love

=== Best Pop Album ===
Year	Performing artist(s)	Album
1998	Nina Badrić	Personality
1999	Tony Cetinski	A1
2000	Gibonni	Judi, zviri i beštimje
2001	Cubismo	Motivo Cubano
2002	Gibonni	Mirakul
2003	Gabi Novak	Pjesma je moj život
2004	Nina Badrić	Ljubav
2005	Arsen Dedić	Na zlu putu
2006	Tony Cetinski	Budi uz mene
2007	Gibonni	Unca fibre
2008	Neno Belan & Fiumens	Rijeka snova
2009	Dino Dvornik	Pandorina kutija
2010	Josipa Lisac	Živim po svome
2011	Jinx	Diksilend
2012	Massimo	Dodirni me slučajno
2013	Tony Cetinski	Opet si pobijedila
2014	Oliver Dragojević	Tišina mora
2015	Detour	A što ak' ja...
2016	Massimo	Dan ljubavi
2017	Oliver Dragojević & Gibonni	Familija
2018	Mia Dimšić	Život nije siv
2019	Detour	TourDetour
2020	Vanna	Izmiješane boje

=== Best Rock Album ===
Year	Performing artist(s)	Album
1994	Hladno Pivo	Džinovski
1995	Laufer	Pustinje
1996	Pips, Chips & Videoclips	Dernjava
1997	Vještice	Kradljivci srca
1998	Prljavo Kazalište	S vremena na vrijeme
1999	Prljavo Kazalište	Dani ponosa i slave
2000	Pips, Chips & Videoclips	Bog
2001	Psihomodo Pop	Debakl
2002	Goran Bare & Plaćenici	Izgubljen i nađen
2003	Lvky	Ararita
2004	Hladno Pivo	Šamar
2005	The Beat Fleet	Maxon Universal
2006	Let 3	Bombardiranje Srbije i Čačka
2007	Gustafi	F.F.
2008	Hladno Pivo	Knjiga žalbe
2009	Majke	Unplugged
2010	Neno Belan & Fiumens	Tvornica snova
2011	The Bambi Molesters	As the Dark Wave Swells
2012	Goran Bare & Majke	Teške boje
2013	Urban & 4	Kundera
2014	Pips, Chips & Videoclips	Walt
2015	Psihomodo Pop	Ćiribu ćiriba
2016	Hladno Pivo	Dani zatvorenih vrata
2017	Let 3	Angela Merkel sere
2018	Mayales	Simbol za sunce
2019	Goran Bare & Majke	Nuspojave
2020	Psihomodo Pop	Digitalno nebo
