= Damir Urban =

Croatian rock musician (born 1968)

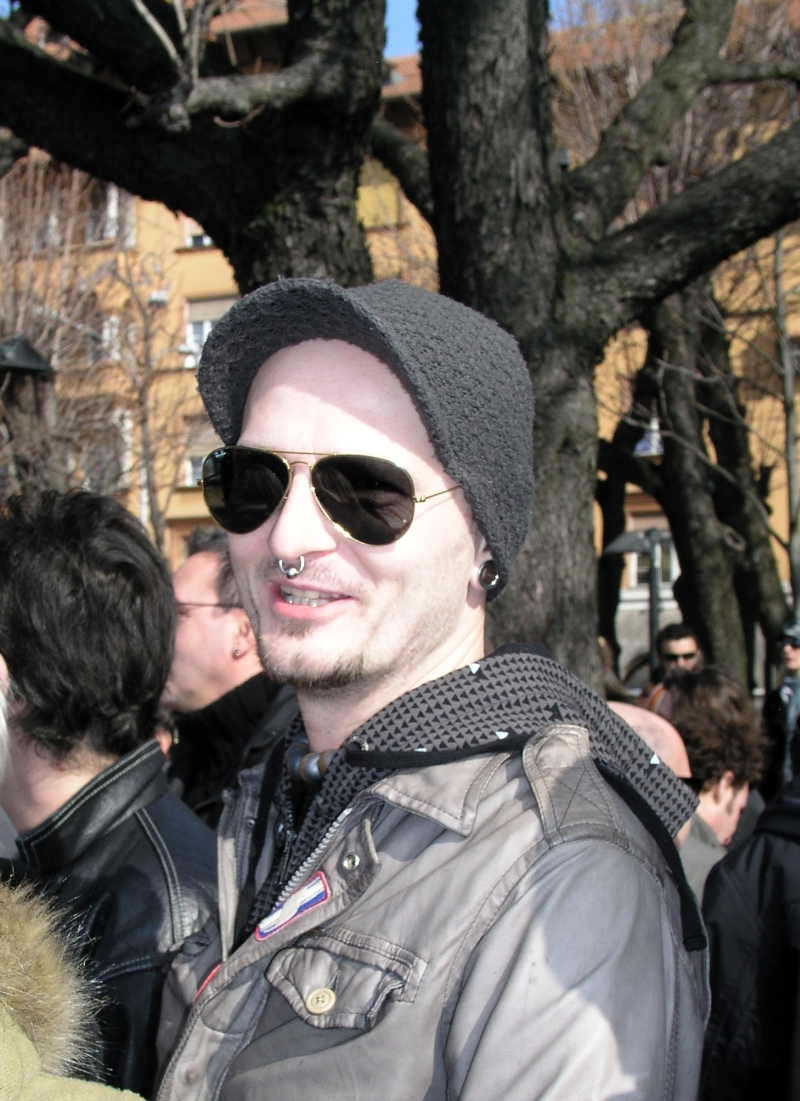
- Urban in February 2008

Background information
- Born: Damir Urban; 19 September 1968 (age 57); Rijeka, SR Croatia, Yugoslavia
- Genres: Rock; alternative rock; pop rock
- Occupations: Singer; songwriter; musician
- Instruments: Vocals; guitar; bass
- Years active: 1984–present
- Labels: Corona Records; Croatia Records; Izabela Records; Aquarius Records
- Member of: Urban & 4
- Formerly of: Laufer

Damir Urban (born 19 September 1968) is a Croatian rock musician best known for his work as a singer/songwriter for Laufer and for his solo work with his band Urban & 4.

== Early years ==
Damir Urban was born on 19 September 1968 in Rijeka, Croatia, a city that is today well known for its rock scene, where he founded his first band La Bellona as the bassist and main songwriter. It is with this band that he performed live for the first time, although little is left today of La Bellona's music.

In 1986 Urban was part of another band as songwriter and vocalist, Laufer, one that defined the Croatian rock scene of the early 1990s. Laufer released their first album, The best off..., in 1993 which spawned hits such as "Lopov Jack", "Svijet za nas" and undoubtedly their most popular song, "Budi moja voda". Urban wrote all of the lyrics and co-wrote most of the music.

Their second album, Pustinje, released in 1994, received the Porin Award for Best Rock Album of the Year. In 1996, the band disbanded due to differences over the musical vision Laufer was to follow. Laufer's greatest hits album, Epitaph, was released via Croatia Records in 2004.

== Solo career ==
Damir Urban released his first solo album in 1996, entitled Otrovna kiša (Poison Rain), to critical and commercial acclaim. The album produced hits such as "Astronaut", but the highlight of his career was yet to follow.

In 1998, he released Žena dijete (Woman-Child) to even greater critical and commercial acclaim, and the album spawned a string of number ones: "Mala truba", "Odlučio sam da te volim" and "Black Tattoo" (which features the Split hip-hop group The Beat Fleet) all received extensive airplay. He refused to receive the Porin (Croatia's equivalent to a Grammy) for the album, as it was nominated for best alternative album but Urban believed his album to be a rock album, therefore, he considered he would be stealing a prize from real alternative artists.

After the tremendous success of Žena dijete, Urban was working on a new album entitled Merkur, and two singles were released: "Aroma Satanica" and "Moja". More than six years passed, and yet Merkur did not see daylight while Damir Urban wrote music for several plays. Finally, in 2004, it was announced that Merkur would be scrapped in favor of another album entitled Retro which was released that same year to mixed reviews but to commercial success.

Retro is highly controversial in that it was a concept album describing the demise of a relationship because of infidelity. Most songs describe Damir Urban's newfound love Milica Czerny, who actually wrote the lyrics to two songs on the album.

Urban & 4 released their new album, Hello!, on 29 May 2009.

Urban was named by the Zoran Milanović government to the Ministry of Culture's Expert Committee for Rock Music and Club Shows for 2016.
