= The Beat Fleet =

Croatian hip-hop group

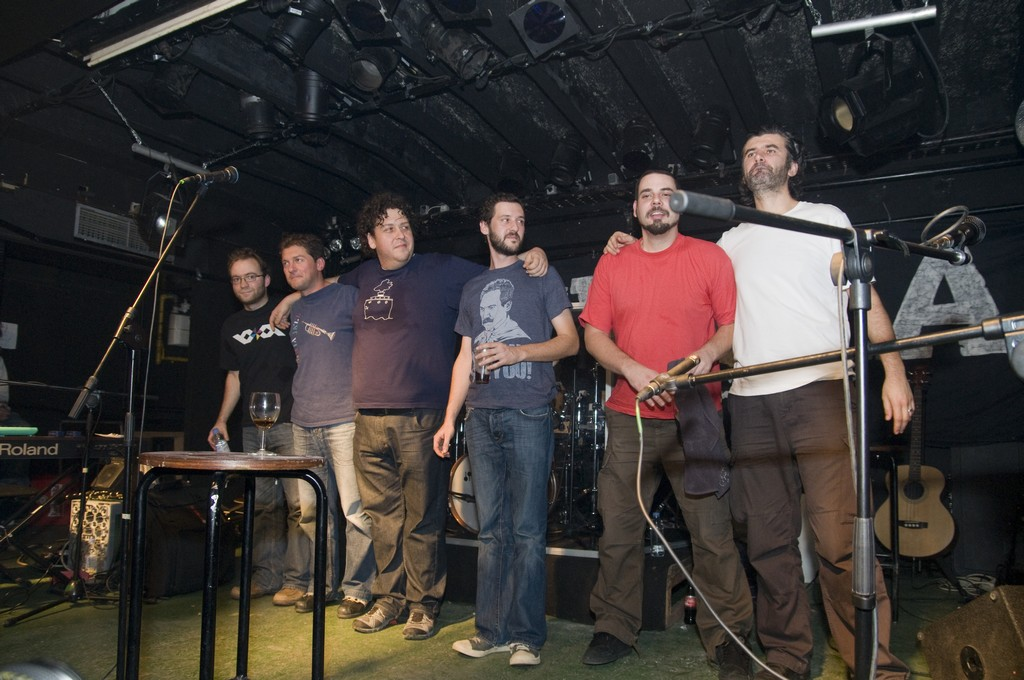
- TBF members in concert at Močvara club in Zagreb in November 2009, when they recorded their live album Perpetuum Fritule

Background information
- Also known as: TBF
- Origin: Split, Croatia
- Genres: Hip-hop; rap rock
- Years active: 1997–present
- Labels: CroRec (1997–1999); Menart (1999–2009); Dallas (2009–present)
- Members: Saša Antić; Mladen Badovinac; Luka Barbić; Ognjen Pavlović; Nikša Mandalinić; Nikola Vidović
- Past members: Nikola Čelan; Sveslav Vrandečić; Nikola Luša; Dragan Lukić Lvky; Edi Grubišić; Jan Ivelić; Petar Radanović

The Beat Fleet, also known as TBF, is a band from Split, Croatia, founded in 1990. Members of the band are: Aleksandar Antić (vocals, lyrics, samples, accordion), Mladen Badovinac (vocal, samples), Luka Barbić (vocals, keyboards, samples), Ognjen Pavlović (bass guitar), Nikša Mandalinić (electric guitar), and Nikola Vidović (drums). They published six albums.

The Beat Fleet are widely considered to be one of the most innovative experimental bands in Croatia and wider area. They are heavily influenced by reggae, the British trip hop scene, electronic and experimental music. With years their built new style of music was named ping pong. Ping pong is a mixture of reggae, afro beat, hip hop, rap rock, alternative rock, dub and British trip hop.

In 2017, former TBF member Nikola Čelan released Baština (Legacy), a book about the emergence of the hip hop scene in Split, as well as the forming years of TBF.

== Discography ==
Studio albums

- Ping-Pong (Umjetnost zdravog đira) (1997)
- Uskladimo toplomjere (2000)
- Maxon Universal (2004)
- Galerija Tutnplok (2007)
- Pistaccio Metallic (2011)
- Danas sutra (2015)

Live albums

- Perpetuum Fritule (2010)

Compilation albums

- Nostalgično fantastično (2011)

Remastered albums

- Maxon Universal (Remastered 2025) (2025)
