= Sarajevo Beer Festival =

- Genre: rock, pop, world music, electronic music
- Dates: Three days, in summer each year.
- Locations: Sarajevo, Bosnia and Herzegovina
- Years active: 2012 - present
- Website: www.sarajevobeerfestival.com

Sarajevo Beer Festival is an annual beer festival held in Sarajevo, Bosnia and Herzegovina. Established in 2012, the festival is held annually over 3 days as a showcase event for various beer producers. In addition to domestic and foreign brews, the festival features live music performances each evening. It has become the largest beer festival in Bosnia and Herzegovina and third largest in the former Yugoslavia, behind the Belgrade Beer Fest and the Macedonia Beer Festival in Prilep. The festival venue is the 17 acre (70,000 square meter) open-air former speed skating ring and encompassing park that makes up part of the Zetra Olympic Center.

== History ==
#	Year	Location	Dates	Headliners	Guests	Notes
1	2012	Metalac	8–9 June	The Beat Fleet, Partibrejkers, Rambo Amadeus, Sunshine, Zoster, Disciplinska komisija, DJ Focho, El Mano		The pilot edition of the festival was organized in the Metalac open-air theatre in downtown Sarajevo. It was the only edition to last two days. All of the subsequent editions lasted three.
2	2013	Zetra Olympic Center	14–16 June	SARS, Hladno pivo, Kiril Džajkovski, Skroz, Damir Urban, Dvadesetorica, dZihan & Kamien, Van Gogh		The 2013 edition was the first to be held at the open-air former speed skating ring and encompassing park that makes up part of the Zetra Olympic Center.
3	2014	Zetra Olympic Center	30 May–1 June	Majke, Magnifico, Bombaj Štampa, Bad Copy, The Beat Fleet, Let 3, Cubismo, Letu štuke, Frenkie		The 2014 edition was the first to promote beer outside of the Former Yugoslavia.
4	2015	Zetra Olympic Center	29-31 May	Crvena jabuka, Partibrejkers, Pochko and the New Primitives, Jinx, Dječaci, Bajaga i Instruktori, Tanja Jovičević, Van Gogh		The musical program was expanded to include daily gigs and concerts instead of only evening ones.
5	2016	Zetra Olympic Center	14-16 July	Bolero, Prljavo kazalište, Dubioza kolektiv, Pips, Chips & Videoclips, Električni orgazam, SARS, Sassja, Psihomodo Pop, Kultur Shock		The musical program was interrupted by rain, but continued two hours later.
6	2017	Zetra Olympic Center	20-22 June	Kiril Džajkovski, Edo Maajka, Dubioza kolektiv, Helem nejse, Whoo See, SARS, Perpetuum Mobile, Parni valjak, Projekat rakija		The musical program included a hip hop set for the first time.
7	2018	Zetra Olympic Center	20-22 June	Bombaj Štampa, Letu Štuke, Kultur Shock, Crvena Jabuka, Hladno pivo, Faithless, Obojeni program, Hladno pivo, TBF		The musical program included an EDM set for the first time.
