= Edo Maajka discography =

- Studio albums: 7
- Live albums: 1
- Compilation albums: 2
- Singles: 21
- Music videos: 17

This is the discography page of the Bosnian rapper Edo Maajka.

Slušaj mater
- Type of album: studio
- Released: 3 July 2002
- Label: Menart/Fmjam
- Last Certification: Platinum
- Singles: "Znaš me", "Jesmo'l sami", "Prikaze"
No sikiriki
- Type of album: studio
- Released: 26 April 2004
- Label: Menart/Fmjam
- Last Certification : 2× Platinum
- Singles: "No sikiriki", "Pržiiiii", "Obećana Riječ", "Ne-mo-žes", "Mater vam jebem"
Stig'o ćumur
- Type of album: studio
- Released: 30 March 2006
- Last Certification: Platinum
- Singles: "To mora da je ljubav", "Bomba", "To što se traži", "Reko sam joj"
Balkansko a naše
- Type of album: studio
- Released: 25 March 2008
- Label: Menart/Fmjam
- Last Certification : TBA
- Singles:"Pokradi lovu", "Gansi", "Svi su ošli na more", "Sve prolazi"
Spomen ploča 2002-2009
- Type of album: compilation/best-of
- Released: 17 June 2010
- Label: Menart/Fmjam
- Last Certification : TBA
- Singles:"Ove godine","Fotelja"
Štrajk mozga
- Type of album: studio
- Released: 21 April 2012
- Label: Menart/Fmjam
- Last Certification : TBAD
- Singles:"Imaš li ti šta para", "Panika", "Džigera beat"

== Music videos ==
=== Edo Maajka albums ===
- Slušaj Mater
  - Znaš me
  - Jesmo'l sami
  - Prikaze
- No Sikiriki
  - No Sikiriki
  - Pržiiiii
  - Obećana rijeć
  - Ne-mo-žes
  - Mater vam jebem
- Stig'o Ćumur
  - To mora da je ljubav
  - Bomba
  - To što se traži
  - Rek'o sam joj
- Balkansko a naše
  - Gansi
  - Sve prolazi
- Spomen ploča 2002-2009
  - Ove godine
  - Fotelja
- Štrajk mozga
  - Panika
  - Facebook

== Production discography ==
Protuotrov
- Released: 10 December 2009
- Label: Menart/Fmjam
- Last Certification: Platinum
- Production credits: "Intro", "Noćna smjena (Night shift)", "Haj to!! (Hej that)", "Chuck Norris rap feat. DJ Soul", Neutralno feat. Edo Maajka (Neutral), Šampion (Champion), Živili feat. Masta Ace & Phat Philly
