= Štrajk mozga =

Studio album by Edo Maajka
- Released: April 21, 2012
- Recorded: October 2011 – March 2012; Morris studio; (Zagreb, Croatia); Bardo studio; (Israel)
- Genres: Bosnian hip hop, conscious hip hop
- Length: 42:43
- Labels: Menart, Fmjam
- Producers: Edo Maajka (exec.), Koolade, Billain, Dash, Goce

Edo Maajka chronology
Spomen ploča (2010)	Štrajk mozga (2012)	Put u plus (2018)

Singles from Štrajk mozga
- 1. "Imaš li ti šta para" Released: June 17, 2011; 2. "Panika" Released: December 26, 2011; 3. "Džigera beat" Released: April 19, 2012

Štrajk mozga (Mind on strike) is the fifth studio album by Bosnian hip-hop star Edo Maajka, released on April 21, 2012. Edo explained in an interview that the title refers to the escape from "norms, media, parents, religion and everything else that takes you away from yourself". The first single was "Imaš li ti šta para", followed by "Panika", for which a music video was released, and the third single "Džigera beat" was released on April 19, 2012.

== Development ==
The majority of the album, if not the core of the album was done over the internet with Edo Maajka and his producers exchanging files electronically. Edo Maajka explained in an interview that he already had some songs ready which he made with the band, but after he realized he had to do most of the album of the internet, he gave up those songs and started to select beats to work on new songs. After he assembled a lot of the beats, he started to write and work on those beats. Edo Maajka further states that after he recorded some, he got the arrangement for the song then he worked with Miro Vidović of Morris Studio over Skype to finalize the arrangement and mixing of the songs. "Basically it is a lot of mails, Skype and uploaded songs" says Edo Maajka.

== Reception ==
Anđelo Jurkas of Hot Night HR gave the album 8 out of the 10. Furthermore, he stated that the beats from Billain, Koolade, Smak, Dasha and Goce were "superb", and that Edo Maajka with his lyrics was in a "good mood, playful, focused, sharp as the toughest days". He also adds that "Edo is an extremely sensitive individual whose verbal talents call to action, not just the current comment." As a final thought he adds "the secret of the new album as well as the previous two is keeping conviction, strength of selected topics and ways of saying, and most insist on a very diverse rhythmic patterns of the producers".

Z. Marković of the portal Terapija rated gave the album an 8 out of 10. He states that "Mind on strike," delivered a couple of really good songs. Which not only continues to confirm the title of Edo Maajka being the best rapper of in the Balkans, but also shows that Edo Maajka is in a constant search for something new, innovative and progressive. He also praised numerous song as standout and having an original sound that includes doses of dubstep and electronics, while there are those classic hip hop beats and scratches combined with guitar solos in songs like "What will they say." or the atmospheric "Sorry Sabina," which by its retro-style reminiscent of the legendary Tupac's album "All Eyez on Me" from 1996. He concludes that the strongest part of the album, as in the previous albums, is Edo Maajka's lyrics, which, when compared to other rappers sound like diaries from introverts of girls because his lyrics are authentic and original.

Benjamin Hasić of Music Zone gave the album a 3.7 out of 5. Praising the beats stating that Edo Maajka has a fine ear for good beats. He also adds that even with his 5th studio album Edo has even more to say. The author comments on Edo's talent by saying that The way he carries his ideas to listeners is amazing, flawless flow makes for a entertaining listening experience, something that most hip hop artists in our country has failed to overcome. Commenting on the overall subject of the album, Benjamin adds that as always, the main theme that runs through the whole album is a social injustice and anger that arises from this injustice. The review commented on the different beats that Edo choose for this album by saying that It is understandable that an artist wants to "grow" and develop their sound., while also commenting on the classic hip hop beats on which he has a chance to show his flow and delivery skills and he concludes the beat selection by saying that I think the Edo managed to find a middle between them wub-wub-wub surface and entertaining old school hip hop background. Commenting on the themes of the songs, Benjamin stats that not one song is on a personal level, rather that every song is at the center of attention at the global, social phenomena such as poverty, corruption, the hole in the ozone and the discontent that is woven into every aspect of public and private life of all inhabitants of the Balkan countries. and also adds that The goal of most songs is not to educate or teach us something new, but let us get going, shock and shake us, which is (at least to me) in itself a good enough goal. Benjamin concludes in his review by saying that Mind on strajk is not the best Edin project, but regardless of that fact a very solid album that is worth to buy..

Aleksandar Dragaš of Jutarnji list also did a review of the album. Dragaš states that the first half of the album is filled with themes that deal with depression caused by job loss, credit loops, life in debt, no winnings in the lottery, and all of this has nothing to do with the economy but more to do with political corruption and pandering to owners who have a big capital. Dragaš furthermore states in such misery, marriages are falling apart, children are suffering, existence is uncertain and panic is rising, but the most important thins is that we are on Facebook and holding a cell phone to are ears and Edo Maajka explains this mentality throughout his songs. Dragaš also stated that Edo Maajka, out of all the regional rappers, has still the strongest guard, sharpest tongue, hardest throat, and sharpest intellect. Dragaš commented on a few songs saying that the most relating songs include Imaš li ti šta para(parable about borrowing money in neighborhoods and lending money to countries who are on the verge of bankruptcy), Facebook (statements about the bad side of the social network and the Internet in general, especially in our county, Drukčiji(about the differences between people, no matter from what city, Ratata/Moj Dj (about the hate that is seen between young people all over the world and a represent track that states who the best DJ is) are my favorite tracks on the album. Dragaš further commented that even though the majority of people are suffering, only Turbo Folk has it good, wherever they are from because Džigera beat is not specific to the Balkans, but America and Europe have their Turbo Folk.Gradaš concludes that Edo Maajka's time has not passed just yet.

Antonio Hadrović of SoundGurdian gave the album a 4 out of 5. He further states that "this album is in line lyrically with Edo Maajka's earlier albums". The single Panika is very well incorporated and organized that you can "clearly hear". Another song "Facebook", Hadrović states is "greatly made, especially the instruments, while the text examines the social network, but to be fair - what was once a forum, today's Zuckerberg network - a place where everyone can unload their shit." Hardović goes on to comment on the song "Diši" by stating that "Breathe with Smak and Željko Pervan evokes Leksaurine on stage behind the Edo and how it is back in the day a powerful live sound and that Pervan has a monologue in the role of small business owner plus. Under the "plus", I think the business owners who reviewed the financial habits that after thirty days of work, the worker waits another thirty days to get paid. This is a classic Edo Maajka storytelling song with a character named Mladen". He further continues to review the songs with Soma tebi, soma njemu is after effect of spending money that you do not have." The next song "Suldigung Sabine" featuring Alexandar Antić, where Edo Maajka sings the chorus and Antić explaining how he hasn't fulfilled the expectations of the opposite sex. Hadrović states that the single Džiger beat is the conceptual follow up on Pržiiiii and both songs were produced by Dash. In the song Edo Maajka name-drops Rote Fabrik, a club in Zürichu, Štuk in Maribor and Kino Šiška in Ljubljana. The song with Marćelo and Kanđžija Drukćiji speaks about "tolerance, guilt and working memory". The songs Ratata/Moj DJ in the beginning addresses "the problems of this region with three religions, and the second song is the classic represent, which on this album is the only one" The last two songs are about "people and their relationships through their families (in the song "Šta će reć" or though politics with the line of least resistance". Hadrović concludes his review saying that this album is like "twelve micro-situational chapters about the slow, but evident, decline of the middle class in all former six republics, especially Bosnia and while General Woo criticized the parliaments and Damir Avdić was directly looking for the ones responsible, Edo raps about the consequences of trying to live a normal life in southeast Europe".

Tomislav Milićević of Reggae portal reviewed the album saying that "Edo Maajka is back" and adding that even if Edo goes into music retirement, with that he will be "a legend", but that Edo still "has lots to say". Milićević further states that on the new album there are no moving, heartbreaking texts such as in "Mahir i Alma" or rebellious texts such as in "Trpaj", but "Edo Maajka is still miles in front of everybody else". He adds that the combination of world class producers and genius lyrics of Edo Maajka, it can not "be a miss". Milićević says that "Edo is still Edo. When it comes to nationalism, "virtuous" politicians, or the "hard" life of the Balkans directors, Edo Maajka is still very sharp, tough, direct and without a shred of self-censorship, as in his best days". He concludes with comparing two guests on the album, "Marčelo is smart and artistic passion, Frenkie has flow and aggressiveness, and Edo has everything"

== Track listing ==
The official track list as released by Edo Maajka:

#	Title	Featured guest(s)	Producer	Translation
1	Panika		Billain	Panic
2	Diši	Željko Pervan and Smak	Radomir Mihajlović Točak;	Breathe
3	Uplaćujem zato		Koolade	I'm paying because
4	Soma tebi, soma njemu intro		Koolade	A grand to you, a grand to him
5	Šuldigung Sabine	Aleksandar Antić	Dash and Sky Wikluh	Schuldigung, Sabine
6	Facebook		Billain	Facebook
7	Imaš li ti šta para		Billain	Do you have any money
8	RaTaTa/Moj DJ	Frenkie	Billain	RaTaTa/My DJ
9	Drukčiji	Marčelo and Kandžija	Koolade	Different
10	Džigera Beat		Dash	Turbo Folk Beat
11	Šta će reć	Arsen Dedić	Dj Goce	What are they going to say
12	Gube se		Billain	They are losing themselves
