= MTV Europe Music Award for Best Adria Act =

List of the MTV Europe Music Award winners and nominees for Best Adriatic Act

The following is a list of the MTV Europe Music Award winners and nominees for Best Adriatic Act.

== 2000s ==
Year	Winner	Nominees
2005	Siddharta	LeeLooJamais; Leut Magnetik; Massimo; Urban & 4
2006	Aleksandra Kovač	Let 3; Edo Maajka; Neisha; Siddharta
2007	Van Gogh	Dubioza kolektiv; Hladno pivo; Jinx; Siddharta
2008	Elvir Laković Laka	The Beat Fleet; Jinx; LeeLooJamais; Marčelo
2009	Lollobrigida Girls	Darkwood Dub; Dubioza Kolektiv; Elvis Jackson; Superhiks

== 2010s ==
Year	Winner	Nominees	Pre-nomination
2010	Gramophonedzie	Gibonni; LeeLooJamais; Edo Maajka; Negative	
2011	Dubioza kolektiv	SevdahBABY; Hladno pivo; Magnifico; S.A.R.S.	
2012	Who See	Elemental; MVP; The Beat Fleet; Trash Candy	
2013	Frenkie	Filip Dizdar; Katja Šulc; S.A.R.S.; Svi na pod!	
2014	Van Gogh	Gramatik; Punčke; Vatra; Who See	Elemental; Kandžija; S.A.R.S.; Skroz
2015	Daniel Kajmakoski	2Cellos; Hladno pivo; Marčelo; Sassja	
2016	S.A.R.S.	Elemental; Luce; Siddharta; Toni Zen	
2017	Ničim Izazvan	Koala Voice; Marin Jurić - Čivro; Nina Kraljić; Sara Jo	
