= Stig'o ćumur =

Studio album by Edo Maajka
- Released: 2006
- Recorded: 2005–2006
- Genre: Rap
- Label: Fmjam Records(Bosnia) Menart Records(Croatia) Bassivity Music(Serbia)
- Producers: Koolade, Dash, Billy, SleepGolfer

Edo Maajka chronology
No sikiriki (2004)	Stig'o ćumur (2006)	Balkansko a naše (2008)

Stig'o ćumur is the third studio album of Bosnian rapper Edo Maajka, which was released 30 March 2006.

"Listen to folk, dance, house, and the rest of the scene. No one is forcing you to listen to me," Edo says in the first track of his third album, in which he dedicates the album to Breza's coal miners and the hard life of coal mining.

The album peaked at number 1 on the Croatian Albums Chart.

== Song descriptions ==
This review describes what each song is about.

- Uši zatvori
  - "Listen to folk, dance, house, and the rest of the scene. No one is forcing you to listen to me," is the chorus of this song. Right off the bet, Edo Maajka explains in the midst of all the criticism about his lyrics that no one is forcing you to play my music.
- Bomba
  - A song about having to pay, literally pay, to keep a beautiful girl around because she's a bomb.
- Budi i ti
  - In this song, Edo and the featured artists are making fun of the American and Balkan music scene and MTV.
- Trpaj
  - A song whose main theme is police brutality.
- Para na paru (uš na fukaru)
  - Money on Money. You need money, but can't find a job and dad won't loan you any.
- Sretno dijete
  - a song about young people and their problems. Through two verses he explains the situation of one young male and female and the problems surrounding them.
- To što se traži
  - An explanation of Edo's thinking what the pop music scene is and his disgust for it.
- Moj cijeli život
  - In a fast tempo song, where he doubled his speed of rapping, Edo talks about how is started in rap and became so famous, but in a very positive way.
- Za Mirzu
  - A storytelling song dedicated to his friend Mirza that explains the current situation in Bosnia and how Mirza misses home because he is currently in New York.
- Reko sam joj
  - A love song about a troubled relationship.
- Moš' me pljuvat'
  - A represent song that is aimed at all the wannabe MC's.
- Stvoren za rep
  - A represent song that explains how Balkan is made for hip hop.
- Blažena tišina
  - This song is long-awaited in the collaboration between Edo Maajka and The Beat Fleet or TBF.
- Nikad više
  - A song about how Edo never again has to prove anything because he has a respectable career behind and ahead of him, but also at the same time he never forgot where he came from.
- Severina
  - The infamous Severina song. Before the album came out, people where excited that Edo Maajka finally made a song to address Severina and the feud with her, but to everyone's surprise, the only relation to Severina in the song is the title. The song itself is of a political/social nature whose central theme is the people who come in an easy way to established positions in society and manipulate suffering people and blind people who do not understand what is actually happening around them.
- Fmjam (Bonus track)
  - A bonus song attached at the 6 min on the Severina song. A represent song in which Edo represents his crew and Fmjam.

== Track listing ==
#	Title	Featured guest(s)	Producer	Translation
1	Uši zatvori		Koolade	Cover Your Ears
2	Bomba		Oneya	The Bomb
3	Budi i ti	Ajs Nigrutin	Dash	You Be Too
4	Trpaj		Dash	Stuff
5	Para na paru (uš na fukaru)	Lollobrigida	SleepGolfer	Money on Money
6	Sretno dijete		Billain	Happy Child
7	To mora da je ljubav	Remi	IDM Music & Zvonimir Dusper	That Must Be Love
8	To što se traži	Dino Šaran	Koolade	That What Is Looked For
9	Moj cijeli život		SleepGolfer	My Entire Life
10	Za Mirzu	Dino Šaran	Billain	For Mirza
11	Rek'o sam joj	Sky-Wikluh	Edo Maajka & Lexaurin	I Told Her
12	Moš' me pljuvat'		Nace	You Can Spit on Me
13	Stvoren za rep	Sky-Wikluh and Frenkie	Baby Dooks	Made for Rap
14	Blažena tišina	TBF	Billain	Blissful Silence
15	Nikad više	Munja (of Defence)	Koolade	Never Again
16	Severina/Fm Jam (hidden track)		Billain	Severina/Fm Jam
