= Slušaj mater =

Studio album by Edo Maajka
- Released: 2002
- Recorded: 2001–2002
- Genres: Rap, Bosnian hip hop
- Length: 74:22
- Labels: Fm Jam Records (Bosnia), Menart Records (Croatia), Bassivity Music (Serbia)
- Producers: Koolade, Dash, Shot

Edo Maajka chronology
Slušaj mater (2002)	No sikiriki (2004)

Slušaj mater (English: "Listen to your mother") was Edo Maajka's debut album, released in 2002. It achieved significant popularity, especially in his native Bosnia, and was the first rap album to win the Davorin music award for best album of the year in that region.

== Overview ==
In Edo's debut album, he addresses subjects ranging from bloody revenge in the song Saletova Osveta ("Sale's Revenge") to tragic love in Mahir i Alma ("Mahir and Alma"). He also talks about exceptional soldiers in the Yugoslav wars and the black market in the song Šverc Komerc ("Smuggling Commerce"). Pare, Pare ("Money, Money" ) is a song about being rich and having everything. In the song Znaš Me ("You Know Me"), Edo talks about his dislike of drugs, politics, and government. He talks about drug dealers and how he hates them, to the point where he kills two drug dealers in the song. He also raps about the paranormal in the song Prikaze ("Apparitions"), which is about how some creatures are in his dreams and haunt him, and in the song Jesmo'l Sami ("Are We Alone"), he talks about aliens and how they might live compared to us.

== Production ==
This album was produced mainly by Dash with the help of Shot and Koolade. All songs were recorded by Mladen Malek in Studio 25. Mix is by Silvio Pasarić in Studio Morris, with additional mixing by Shot and Koolade in Studio 25. The mastering was done by Miro Vidović in Studio Morris. The cover was done by EdoAlmin Chel and logo by Filip Tattoos. It was all released on the MenArt label and Fm Jam records.

== Reception ==
The album received overwhelming praise from critics. It is stated as the hip hop album that broke boundaries in the Balkan hip hop scene (including Bosnia, Croatia and Serbia). Edo began being called pop version of hip hop. Edo was overwhelmingly praised for his lyrics, and for interesting and original songs which include Prikaze, Jesmo'l sami, and De-ža-vu. With these songs, Edo hit territory that no other rapper had crossed before. With this album, Edo Maajka became a hot spot for interviews and analysis.

== Track listing ==
#	Title	Featured guest(s)	Producer	Translation
1	Intro		Dash	Intro
2	Slušaj mater		Koolade	Listen to Your Mother
3	Minimalni rizik		Dash	Minimal Risk
4	Rado viđen		Dash	Gladly Seen
5	Jesmo'l sami	Đuro (Introduction)	Koolade	Are we alone
6	Saletova Osveta		Dash	Sale's Revenge
7	Prikaze		Dash	Apparitions
8	Recitacija		Dash	Recitation
9	Mahir i Alma		Shot	Mahir and Alma
10	Faca (Intro)		Dash	The Man (Intro)
11	Faca		Shot	The Man
12	Znaš Me (Intro)		Dash	You Know Me (Intro)
13	Znaš Me	Sandra and Andrea	Dash	You Know Me
14	Šverc Komerc	Stoka	Dash	Smuggling Commerce
15	De-Ža-Vu	Remi	Shot	Deja Vu
16	Šank	Nered, Bizzo and Mirza	Dash	The Bar
17	Pare, Pare		Dash	Money, Money
18	Molitva	El Bahatee and Nikola	Dash	Prayer
19	Za i Protiv		Dash	For and Against
20	Nemoj Se Bojat'		Dash	Don't Be Scared
21	Outro		Dash	Outro
