= Edo Maajka – Sevdah o Rodama =

Edo Maajka - Sevdah o Rodama
- Directed by: Silvija Mirošničenka; Nikolina Kovačić
- Produced by: Hrvoje Habeković
- Starring: Edo Maajka
- Narrated by: Edo Maajka; Silvana Armenulić
- Edited by: Nana Šojlev; Hrvoje Mršić; Nenad Vuković
- Music by: Edo Maajka
- Distributed by: HTV documentary program
- Release date: 27 July 2007 (Motovun Film Festival)
- Running time: 52 minutes
- Countries: Croatia; Bosnia and Herzegovina
- Languages: Croatian; Bosnian

Edo Maajka – Sevdah o Rodama is a 2007 documentary about Bosnian rapper Edo Maajka.

== About ==
The documentary follows Edo Maajka from his birthplace Brčko to Novi Pazar, where he is having the first hip hop concert ever held there in that region of Sandžak. Along the way Edo talks about his childhood, the war, how he got involved in hip hop and when and how he met his best friends Frenkie and the other Fmjam crew. Edo talks about being part of Defence and later the hip hop crew Disciplinska Komisija.

This was the first Croatian and Bosnian documentary about the hip hop genre. The documentary won DORF by beating 17 other documentaries from: Britain, Slovenia, Serbia, Bosnia and Croatia.

== Premier and showings ==
The documentary premiered in the "Motovun Film Festival" in 2007, and on television, it premiered on the channel HTR 1 on October 28, 2007. It was shown at "ZagrebDoxu" in 2008; at the cinema SC for the yearly "Days of Croatian Movies"; at the Skoplje Film Festival; at the Chicago Festival of Bosnian Films from 25.4 to 28.4 2008, which was organized by Edgewater Film Society with the help of International Film and Media Studies Program at Loyola Univerzitetu Chicago; and at the KIC cinema in Zagreb on 22 February 2008 and 23 February 2008.

== Awards ==
- 2007 - People's Choice - 5th Liburnia Film Festival
- 2008 - Documentary Festival (DORF) - Best Documentary
