= Balkansko a naše =

Studio album by Edo Maajka
- Released: 25 March 2008
- Recorded: October 2007 – April 2008; Morris studio (Zagreb, Croatia); Element studio (Zagreb, Croatia); Sterling Sound; New York City
- Genres: Bosnian hip hop, conscious hip hop
- Length: 54:38
- Labels: Menart, Fmjam, Multimedia Records
- Producers: Edo Maajka (exec.), Koolade, Dj Knowhow

Edo Maajka chronology
Stig'o Ćumur (2006)	Balkansko a naše (2008)	Spomen ploča (2010)

Singles from Balkansko a naše
- 1. "Pokradi lovu" Released: 16 November 2007; 2. "Gansi" Released: 14 April 2008; 3. "Svi su ošli na more" Released: 18 June 2008; 4. "Sve prolazi" Released: 18 December 2008

Balkansko a naše (From the Balkans, But Ours) is the fourth solo studio album by the Bosnian rapper Edo Maajka, released on 25 March 2008.

The whole album was produced by Koolade, except for "Daj mi ljubav" ("Give Me Love"), which was produced by DJ Knowhow. The first official single, "Pokradi lovu" ("Steal Money"), was released as a promotional single by Fmjam on their official web-site. The second single is "Gansi". The third single is "Svi su ošli na more". The fourth single is "Sve prolazi" with a music video.

The album peaked at number 1 on the Croatian Albums Chart.

== Track listing ==
#	Title	Featured guest(s)	Translation
1	Intro		Intro
2	Daj mi ljubav		Give Me Love
3	Klimaj glavom		Nod Your Head
4	Ove godine slavim		This Year I'm Celebrating
5	Gansi		Guns
6	Pokradi lovu		Steal the Money
7	Sve prolazi	Saša Antić	Everything Passes
8	Volim te	Burky and General Woo	I Love You
9	Ovaj ritam volim	Koolade	I Love This Rhythm
10	Veliki medo	Ivana Starčević	Big Teddy Bear
11	Hag	Dino Šaran	The Hague
12	I dalje slušam		I'm Still Listening
13	Svi su ošli na more		Everyone's gone to the Beach
14	FmJam I Like	Disciplinska Komisija	FmJam I Like
15	Hvala, voli vas Maajka		Thanks, Maajka Loves You
