= Billain =

Bosnian DJ (born 1983)

- Also known as: Billy; Billainbeats; Aethek
- Born: Adis Kutkut; August 1, 1983 (age 43)
- Origin: Sarajevo, Bosnia and Herzegovina
- Genres: Drum and bass; Neurofunk
- Occupations: Music producer; Sound designer; DJ
- Years active: 2008–present
- Labels: Bad Taste Recordings; Breed 12 Inches; Citrus Recordings; Civil Music; Close 2 Death Recordings; Critical Music; Fatality Recordings; FM Jam Records; Med School Music; Menart Records; Mindtech Recordings; Rise Audio; Syndrome Audio; Vision Recordings
- Website: www.billain.net

Billain (born Adis Kutkut) is a Bosnian drum and bass producer, DJ and sound designer from Sarajevo. He is mostly known for his distinctive style within the neurofunk genre and his collaborations with rappers Frenkie and Edo Maajka.

== Career ==
Billain was influenced as a pre-teen by the Bosnian War. During the four-year-long Siege of Sarajevo he began to draw and later discovered graffiti and created his first hip hop productions.

In search of new possibilities to express his feelings originating in the siege, at first Billain taught himself how to produce techno music and later neurofunk. Before he released his first music, Billain joined the drum and bass collective Kontra which organised many drum and bass events in Sarajevo with DJs like Matrix & Optical, Teebee, Stakka & Skynet and Konflict. His music has been played on BBC Radio 1 and has been featured on UKF Music.

In 2014, Billain, alongside composer Sloven Anzulović, created and composed the sound design and music for the re-opening ceremony of the rebuilt National and University Library of Bosnia and Herzegovina, which had been destroyed in 1992.

In 2018, Kutkut designed sounds for the movies Pacific Rim Uprising and Hunter Killer and created the soundtrack of the horror game Scorn.

Billain also releases shortfilms about technological singularity and artificial intelligence. With his side project Aethek, he drifts towards the genre of Noise music, only focusing on sound design instead of melody and rhythm.

== Discography ==
=== Albums ===
- Nomad's Revenge (2019, Renraku Global Media)
- Lands Unbreached (2022, Renraku Global Media)
- Mirror (2025, Evolution Chamber)

=== EPs ===
- Broken Universe EP (2010, Citrus Recordings), with Future Signal
- Kontra EP (2011, Citrus Recordings)
- #DNA EP (2014, Fmjam Records), with Frenkie
- Colossus EP (2014, Bad Taste Recordings)
- Binary Volume 3 (2014, Critical Music)
- Colonize EP (2015, Eatbrain)
- 1991 VG (2017, Renraku Global Media) as Aethek
- Different Eyes (2023, Vision Recordings)

=== Singles ===
- Rhyno / Intrusion (2008, Breed 12 Inches), Rhyno by Receptor
- Glome / The Solution (2010, Fatality Recordings), The Solution by High Maintenance
- Coded (2011, Close 2 Death Recordings), on Blood Money LP Part 1
- Phalando / Away we go (2011, Close 2 Death Recordings), Away we go by Para
- Pranksters / Li (2011, Citrus Recordings), Pranksters by Dabs
- Probes / Horus 8 (2011, Syndrome Audio)
- Soulmatter (2011, Rise Audio), on Rise Audio EP
- Total Darkness / Fiber Twist (2012, Rise Audio)
- God Ribs (2012, Rise Audio), on RA004 EP
- Batbots / Manifold (2012, Bad Taste Recordings)
- Blockfield / Boogie (2013, Bad Taste Recordings)
- Supertensor / Equilateral (2013, Mindtech Recordings), Equilateral by Allied
- Wizard (2014, Bad Taste Recordings), with Teddy Killerz on Machine Room Level Two
- Device Nine (2014, Rise Audio), on RA010 EP
- Safety Hatch (2015, Underslung Audio)
- Metal Jaws (2016, Bad Taste Recordings), on MethLab, Vol. 2
- Specialist (2016, Inspected Records), on Glados EP
- Vertebrae (2016, MethLab Recordings), on Monoleth 001 EP as Aethek

=== Remixes ===
- Krakpot (Billain Remix) (2012, Close 2 Death Recordings), original by Optiv
- Half Life (Billain Remix) (2013, Civil Music), original by Reso, released on Tangram Remixed
- Paradox (Billain Remix) (2014, Vandal Records), original by Opsen & Primal Therapy
- Ambers Love Was Like A Marble (Billain Remix) (2014, Med School Music), original by Rawtekk, released on Sprouted and Reformed
- Tetsuo's Redemption (Billain Remix) (2014, Owsla), original by KOAN Sound & Asa
- Mantra (Billain Remix) (2016, Mindtech LTD), original by AKOV
- Rethink (Billain Remix) (2016, Othercide Records), original by Current Value

=== Productions ===
- Odličan CD (2005, Menart Records), album by Frenkie; production of Outro
- Stig'o ćumur (2006, Fmjam Records, Menart Records), album by Edo Maajka; production of Sretno dijete, Za Mirzu, Blažena tišina and Severina/Fm Jam
- Štrajk mozga (2012, Fmjam Records, Menart Records), album by Edo Maajka; production of Panika, Facebook, Imaš li ti šta para, RaTaTa / Moj Dj and Gube Se
- Prodike (2014, JabbaTon Records), by Fil Tilen and P Money
- Igra riječi (2014, Fmjam Records), album by Kontra; production of Velepodaja
- Reexperience (2015, Fmjam Records, Menart Records), album by Frenkie; production of Film, S.C.A., Izgubljeni snovi, Mali od Ede and Gdje god su moji

=== Short films ===
- Assembly (2014)
- Fugitive (2022)

=== Sound Design ===
- Pacific Rim Uprising (2018), additional synth programming
- Hunter Killer (2018), additional synth programming
- Scorn (2018), soundtrack and additional sound design
