= Petrolea =

Petrolea may refer to:

- Petrolea, former name of Petrolia, California
- Petrolea, former name of Petrolia, Ontario
- Petrolea (album), 2006 album by Slovenian rock band Siddharta
- Petrolea, 2020 Song by Mili (musical group) from the album 'Intrauterine Education'

== See also ==
- Petrolea Vale, an early alternative name for Hartley Vale, New South Wales.
