= Rawtekk =

German electronic music duo

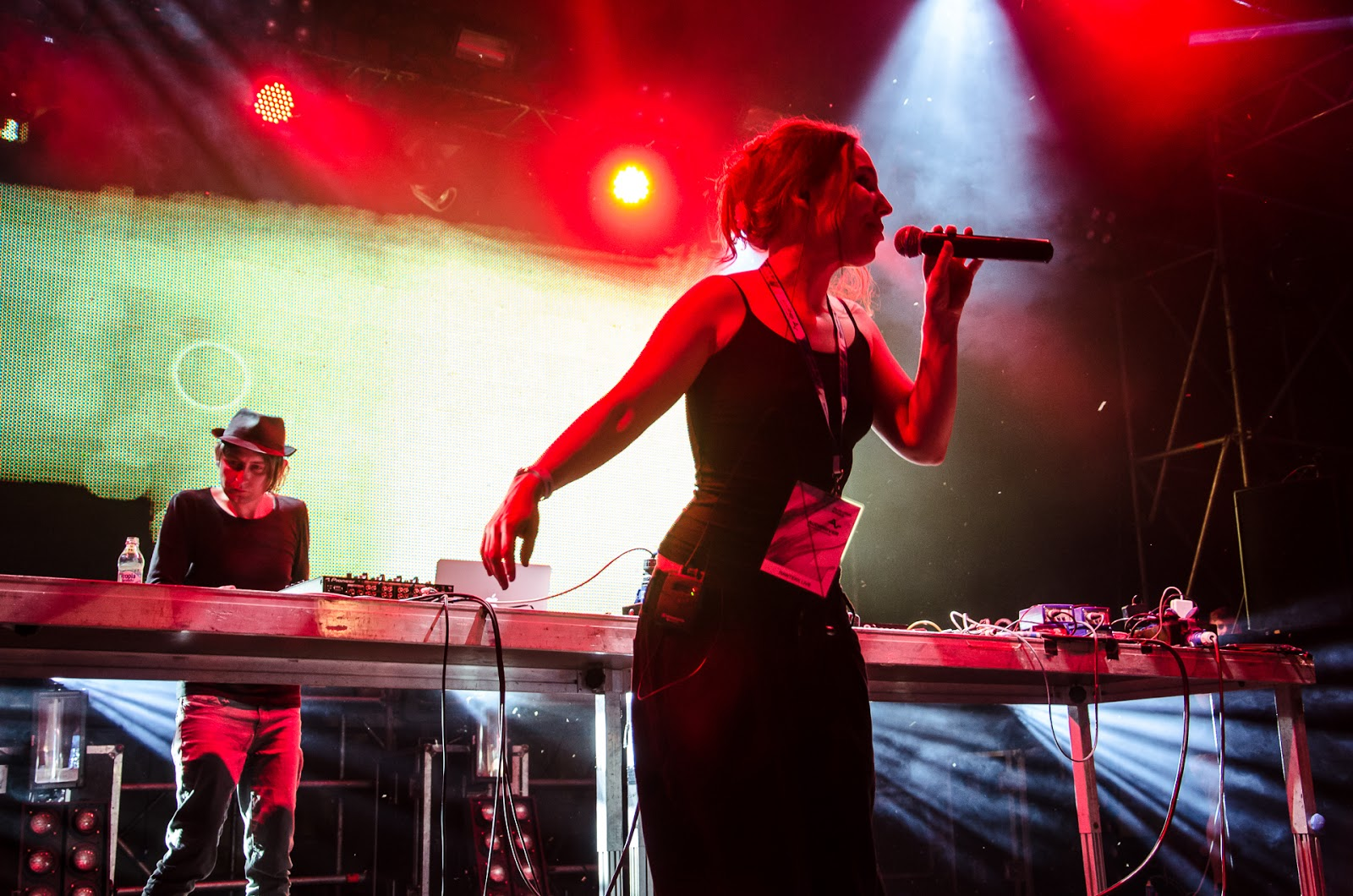
- Rawtekk performing Live at Audioriver Festival 2015

Background information
- Origin: Hamburg, Germany
- Genres: Drum and bass Neurofunk; Neurohop; Electronica; IDM
- Years active: 2001–present
- Labels: Med School Music; MethLab Recordings
- Members: Stefan Westphal; Christine Westphal

Rawtekk (stylized as RAWTEƎKꓘ) is a German electronic music duo consisting of Stefan and Christine Westphal from Hamburg.

Apart from composing electronic music, they also produce music for commercial spots, image films and sound logos under the alias Noise Design. Furthermore, they develop sample libraries and demo songs for Steinberg's DAW Cubase, Halion, Halion Sonic and Sequel.

In 2011, they received the award for the best commercial music in Germany (Deutscher Werbefilmpreis). Since 2013, Christine is a member of the German Advertising Film Academy.

== Career ==
In 2001, Stefan founded Rawtekk to release drum and bass and breaks. His first release, Your Game, came in 2006 on Destination Recordings and was followed a year later with a trio of 12"s for Syndrome Audio, Citrus, and Disturbed. The couple started working together in 2011, combining Stefan’s knowledge in the production of experimental electronica, minimal techno and drum and bass with Christine's experiences as singer and songwriter. The duo acquired first recognition when Hospital Records' offshoot Med School included their track "Snowflakes" on the compilation New Blood 011, which was released in March 2011.

In 2013, they released their first album, Sprouted And Formed, on the same label. The album was featured in Vice magazine's top 5 "Best Drum & Bass Albums" of 2013. In 2014, Med School released a remix EP under the name Sprouted And Reformed which, apart from two new versions of Snowflakes, included remixes by fellow drum and bass producers Phace, Mefjus and Billain.

Their second album, titled Here's To Them, was released on 6 May 2016. In 2018, four tracks of that album were remixed by Disprove, Joe Ford, Woulg & Lbardsley and Audeka and were released as an EP on Med School.

== Discography ==
=== Studio albums ===
- 2013 – Sprouted And Formed
- 2016 – Here's To Them
- 2016 – Rawtekk Reloaded Pt. 1
- 2016 – Rawtekk Reloaded Pt. 2

=== EPs ===
- 2014 – Sprouted And Reformed
- 2018 – Here's To Them (Remixes)

=== Singles ===
- 2006 – Your Game / Silent Rave / Inside
- 2007 – Exhale (with N.Phect)
- 2007 – To Be A Boy / Hunter
- 2007 – Seduce / The Brood
- 2008 – Stretch Pack (with Phace) / Life Goes On (with Phace feat. Eisblume)
- 2008 – Respond / Distaste
- 2008 – D.N.A. VIP / Disarm
- 2009 – Soul Rocket Remix (feat. Eisblume)
- 2009 – Volume 18
- 2010 – Snowfall / Repulsion (with Mofi)
- 2011 – Rule Of Thumb
- 2011 – Rollercase 2011

=== Releases on compilations ===
- 2008 – Open Boarders / Savage (Citrus Recordings), Savage by Spinor
- 2011 – Snowflakes (New Blood 011, Med School Music)
- 2013 – Photone Recruits (Hospitality Summer Drum & Bass 2013, Hospital Records)
- 2016 – Restless (Instrumental) (Ten Years of Med School, Med School Music)
- 2016 – Samurai (with Audeka) (MethLab Vol. 2, Bad Taste Recordings)
- 2016 – Subway (Revenant, MethLab Recordings)
- 2016 – Solar Grace (with Audeka) (Monoleth, MethLab Recordings)

=== Collaborations ===
- 2016 – Necromancy (with Audeka) (Lost Souls LP, MethLab Recordings)

=== Remixes ===
- 2013 – Neosignal – Angst (Rawtekk Remix)
- 2014 – Rawtekk – Snowflakes (Rawtekk Neuropop Vip)
- 2016 – Mefjus feat. Maksim – Change Of Mind (Rawtekk Remix)
- 2016 – London Electricity – Telefunken Lizard Filter (Rawtekk Remix)

== Videos ==
- 2016 – Here's To Them
- 2016 – Restless
