= No sikiriki =

Studio album by Edo Maajka
- Released: 3 May 2004
- Recorded: 2003–2004
- Genre: Rap
- Length: 73:27
- Label: Fm Jam Records (Bosnia) Menart Records (Croatia) Bassivity Music (Serbia)
- Producers: Executive producers Edo Maajka, Koolade, Dash, Shot

Edo Maajka chronology
Slušaj mater (2002)	No sikiriki (2004)	Stig'o ćumur (2006)

No Sikiriki is Edo Maajka's second studio album released on May 3, 2004, by Menart records in Croatia, Fmjam records and Malex Music in Bosnia and Bassivity Music in Serbia. In 2005, the album won numerous awards from different award ceremonies including album of the year and song of the year for the title track. It was the most anticipated hip hop album after the hit album Slušaj mater.

== The album ==
This album has a number of themes that were also featured in the previous album. Themes include war, post war issues, social commentary and storytelling and sequels to songs that were in previous albums.

== Track listing ==
#	Title	Featured guest(s)	Producer	Notes	Translation
1	Sevdah O Rodama			guitar: E. Zejnilović, bass & kontrabass: Kadri Bassic, clarinet: G. Tudor-Lipi	Sevdah Song About Storks
2	To Sam Ja		DJ. Mezuian & Pimp Beats		That Is Me
3	Pržiiiii	Dino Šaran	Dash		Burnnnnn
4	On Je Mlađi		Andrej		He's Younger
5	Dragi Moj Vlado		Koolade		My Dear Vlado
6	Svudi San Bija		Baby Dooks	scratch: DJ. Ahmaad, sample: Urban & TBF - Black Tattoo	I've Been Everywhere
7	Savske meduze		Baby Dooks		Jellyfishes of Sava
8	Ruke Gore		Baby Dooks		Hands Up
9	Slušajte Me Sad	Davor Erceg	Oneya		Listen To Me Now
10	No sikiriki	chorus: Tajana, Martina, Ivana, Ivan, & David	Shot	bass: Kadri Bassic	No Worries
11	Kliše		Koolade		Cliché
12	Ožeži	Frenkie	Dash	guitar: M. Miletić, bass: B. Gudelj	Hit It
13	Obećana Riječ	Dado Topić	Dash	back vocal: Mirza, bass & guitar: M. Miletić, Croatia Records	The Promised Word
14	Legenda o Elvisu		Dash		The Legend About Elvis
15	Kidanje Veza		Dash	violine: M. Miletić	Tearing Relations
16	Down	Diyala	Shot		Down
17	Ne-mo-žeš	Frenkie	Soul		You-Can-Not
18	Samo za raju		Koolade		Only For the People
19	Mater Vam Jebem		Dash	saxophone: G. Tudor-Lipi	Fuck Your Mother
