= Scorn (video game) =

- Developer: Ebb Software
- Publisher: Kepler Interactive
- Director: Ljubomir Peklar
- Producers: Mirko Božović; Fljorim Bejić; Lazar Mesaroš
- Designers: Ljubomir Peklar; Dušan Santovac
- Programmer: Milan Cekić
- Artist: Filip Acović
- Composers: Adis Kutkut (Aethek); Brian Williams (Lustmord)
- Engine: Unreal Engine 4
- Platforms: Microsoft Windows; Xbox Series X/S; PlayStation 5
- Release: Windows, Xbox Series X/S; 14 October 2022; PlayStation 5; 3 October 2023
- Genres: Survival horror, biopunk, adventure
- Mode: Single-player

Scorn is a 2022 survival horror adventure game developed by Ebb Software. Drawing on biopunk themes, the game is inspired by the works of visual artists H. R. Giger and Zdzisław Beksiński. The game was released on 14 October 2022 for Microsoft Windows and Xbox Series X/S. It was subsequently released for PlayStation 5 on October 3, 2023.

== Gameplay ==
The player controls an entity lost in a nightmarish world filled with grotesque creatures and techno-organic, living structures composed of machines, flesh, and bone. Over the course of the game, the player must explore different interconnected regions, fighting for survival, and gaining vague insights into the nature of the game's world.

Gameplay is primarily split between exploration, puzzle-solving, and combat. Puzzles are primarily based in experimentation and learning the nature of the many machines in the environment, such as repairing a complex transit system. For combat, the game presents various biomechanical weapons that all attach to a modular base: to utilize a specific weapon, the player character must remove the current weapon from the base and replace it with another. The game features four weapons: A melee weapon similar to a captive bolt pistol called a "tool gun" (Note: The game features no text or speech; the names in the synopsis are derived from the game's artbook.), which can also be used to interact with machinery at specific points; a pistol-like weapon, which can be used for accurate low-powered shots; a shotgun-like weapon, which has high damage at close range, but a low ammo capacity; and an implosive grenade launcher, mostly used for environmental destruction in the context of puzzles. Ammunition and health is deposited from limited-use storage stations. Health does not replenish on death, but can be replenished with a handheld device that is refilled.

== Synopsis ==
The story is set in an undetermined location apparently following a devastating war. The silent humanoid protagonist first awakens and attempts to cross a wasteland called The Field heading towards the looming citadel called The Crater seen in the distance. While making its way to The Crater, the protagonist falls down a crevasse into a factory called the Assembly, a recycling plant that repurposes living things. While traversing the facility, the protagonist gradually acquires various weapons and tools which allow it to manipulate the facility's technology. Once it reaches the heart of the facility, the protagonist causes the heart's arteries to burst which knocks it unconscious and covers it with fluid. At this point, the protagonist seemingly faints while a being similar to the protagonist awakens and emerges from an egg-like shell structure elsewhere. The new protagonist makes its way to The Crater, which has seemingly been infested with hostile entities.

In the Crater, the protagonist is attacked and infested by a parasite, which allows the protagonist to use several weapons and machines, but regularly wounds it and sprouts tendril-like appendages that gradually cover the protagonist's body. The infested protagonist reaches a central elevator that has been enveloped by a massive creature with a vaguely humanoid head called "The Crater Queen". Reactivating the elevator apparently kills the Queen but allows the protagonist access to a monorail to reach a temple called Polis.

While the protagonist is exploring the temple, the parasite nearly fully envelops it, forcing it to use a machine to remove the parasite. During this process, it is heavily implied that the parasite is actually the first protagonist who mutated when the Assembly heart burst. Just before it is removed, the parasite disembowels the protagonist, who staggers to another medical device that connects it to an apparent hive mind within the temple. Controlling two androids called Shells, the second protagonist attempts to carry its own body towards a swirling energy field, but gets attacked and infected by the parasite before it can reach the field. With the parasite now merged with the protagonist, the two form a mass of seemingly immovable flesh.

== Development ==
Scorn was developed by Serbian game development studio Ebb Software, founded in 2013. The developers claim to have designed the game around the idea of "being thrown into the world", and as such, very little context is given about the game's setting. They also explained that they want the unsettling environment to be a character itself. The game director wanted to study the "Space Jockey" from the film Alien, the pilot of the crashed spaceship on planet LV-426. The technology and the living tissue all look as if it is part of one being; everything within the game abides by this idea of solid materials impregnated with organic growths. Scorn's world aesthetic was also inspired by the work of Zdzisław Beksiński.

The game was announced on 12 November 2014, with a trailer showing pre-alpha footage, followed by a Kickstarter campaign in December 2014, which ended unsuccessfully; despite this, the game remained in development with a planned two-part release. In January 2015, Scorn received private funding from an investor and full production started in February 2015. The game was planned to be released in two parts, with only the first part being announced as Dasein (German pronunciation: [ˈdaːzaɪn] , a German word that means "existence" in vernacular German (German: da "there"; sein "to be"), and "being-in-the-world" in Martin Heidegger's philosophy). In August 2018, the production team announced that they would launch the game as a whole, instead of in parts, although no concrete release date was announced.

In 2017, Ebb Software launched a second Kickstarter, which reached its goal of €150,000 in September of that year.

On 7 May 2020, it was announced that the game would be published on PC and have timed console exclusivity on Xbox Series X/S, running in 4K and 60fps, and would not be released on the previous generation of consoles as the developer team did not want to spend development time on what would be a sub-par version of the game. Scorn was also released on Steam, Windows Store, and GOG.

On 9 November 2021, CEO and creative director Ljubomir Peklar posted a Kickstarter update to address the game's delays and lack of communication, suggesting that unsatisfied backers request a refund; the post was criticized by backers for its "hostile tone", for which Peklar later apologized.

== Reception ==
Reception

Aggregate score
Aggregator	Score
Metacritic	(PC) 70/100 (XSXS) 64/100

Review scores
Publication	Score
Electronic Gaming Monthly	4/5
GameSpot	4/10
IGN	7/10
PC Gamer (US)	80/100

Scorn received "mixed or average" reviews, according to the review aggregator Metacritic. Though praised for its puzzles and art direction, Scorn faced frequent criticisms for its combat, which many reviewers felt was tedious and unnecessary. PC Gamer US described the game as a surreal horror adventure, and said:

"the striking visual feast of the alien capital, accompanied by mournful audio, practically moved me to tears. It was so strange and wonderful, and seemed to hint at some greater mystery at the heart of Scorn".

Conversely, they sometimes criticized unclear gameplay and the checkpoint system.

Alessandro Barbosa of GameSpot praised Scorn for its interesting setting and aesthetic, but heavily critiqued it for its "frustrating combat, unbalanced puzzles, and unforgiving checkpoints", feeling they made the game "an infuriating slog".

Writing for IGN, Leana Hafer described the game as "a relentlessly unsettling delve into Hell with dreadful combat", adding "combat itself is dreadful, and I don't mean that in a good way", though applauding its "macabre art direction" and puzzles. Hafer concluded Scorn would have been a better experience had most if not all of the combat been removed, feeling it "[worked] against the exploration and puzzle-solving aspects".

Electronic Gaming Monthly's Michael Goroff echoed the combat complaints, believing it "[felt] more annoying than tense", but kept the game from "feeling like a walking simulator". Goroff commended the exploration and puzzle aspects working together with the overall horror tone of the game, saying "everything in Scorn seems built around the simple desire of making players feel like they’re somewhere new" and considered it to have captured the "horrified and disturbed, exhilarated and intrigued" experience of a nightmare.
