= Id (Siddharta album) =

Studio album by Siddharta
- Released: 27 May 1999
- Recorded: April 1998 – February 1999; Studio Tivoli
- Genre: Alternative rock, experimental rock
- Length: 42:23
- Language: Slovenian, English
- Label: Multimedia
- Producer: Dejan Radičevič, Anders Kallmark

Siddharta chronology
| Id (1999) | Nord (2001) |

Singles from Id
- 1. "Pot v X" Released: November 1999; 2. "Lunanai" Released: April 2000

Professional ratings
Review scores
| Source | Rating |
|---|---|
| Rockline | 4.5/5 stars |

Id (stylised as ID) is the debut album of the Slovenian rock band Siddharta, released on 27 May 1999. It was named after Sigmund Freud's psychoanalytical theory of personality.

== Track listing ==
All tracks are written by Tomi Meglič, except where noted

| No. | Title | Length |
|---|---|---|
| 1. | "Indija" (T. Meglič, Primož Benko) | 3:49 |
| 2. | "Pot v X" | 4:07 |
| 3. | "L.E." | 4:38 |
| 4. | "Le mavrica" | 3:32 |
| 5. | "Farmer" | 2:55 |
| 6. | "Črnobelo" | 3:50 |
| 7. | "Lunanai" | 4:04 |
| 8. | "Siddharta" | 6:31 |
| 9. | "Nespodobno opravilo" | 3:13 |
| 10. | "..." | 5:44 |
| Total length: | | 42:23 |

Bonus tracks
| No. | Title | Length |
|---|---|---|
| 11. | "Stipe" | 2:21 |

== Personnel ==
=== Siddharta ===
- Tomi Meglič — vocals, guitar, back vocals
- Primož Benko — guitar, back vocals
- Boštjan Meglič — drums, back vocals
- Cene Resnik — saxophone, back vocals
- Primož Majerič — bass guitar
- Tomaž Okroglič Rous — keyboards

=== Additional musicians ===
- Anders Kallmark — intro arrangements, keyboards

== Notes ==
1. Only the song "..." is sung in English.
