= Siddharta (band) =

Slovenian rock band

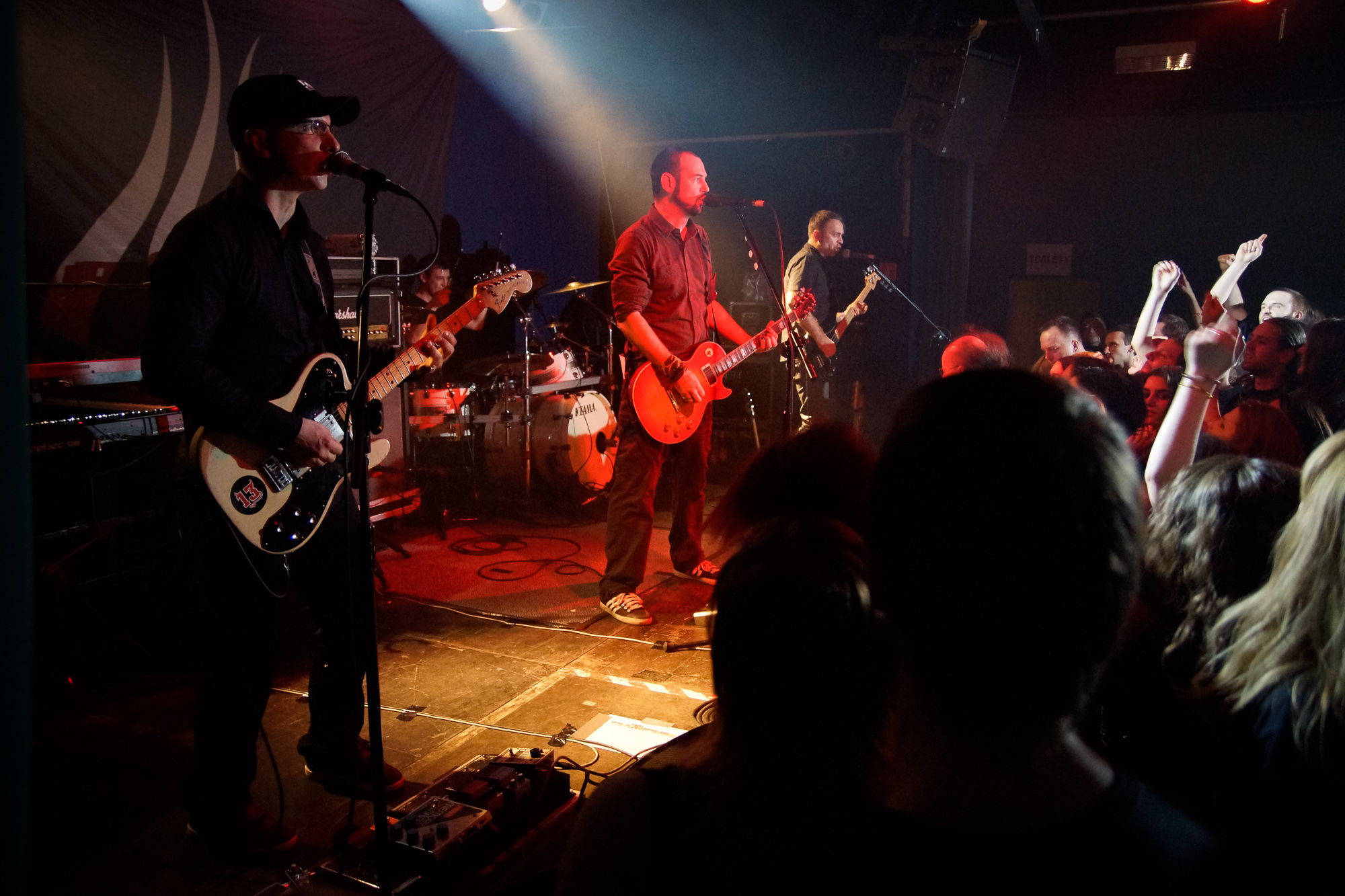
- Siddharta band, Warsaw 2014.

Background information
- Origin: Slovenia
- Genres: Alternative rock, Alternative metal, Progressive rock
- Years active: 1995–present
- Labels: Multimedia Records; KifKif Records
- Members: Tomi Meglič; Primož Benko; Jani Hace; Boštjan Meglič; Nejc Škofic
- Past members: Primož Majerič; Cene Resnik; Tomaž Okroglič Rous
- Website: www.Siddharta.net

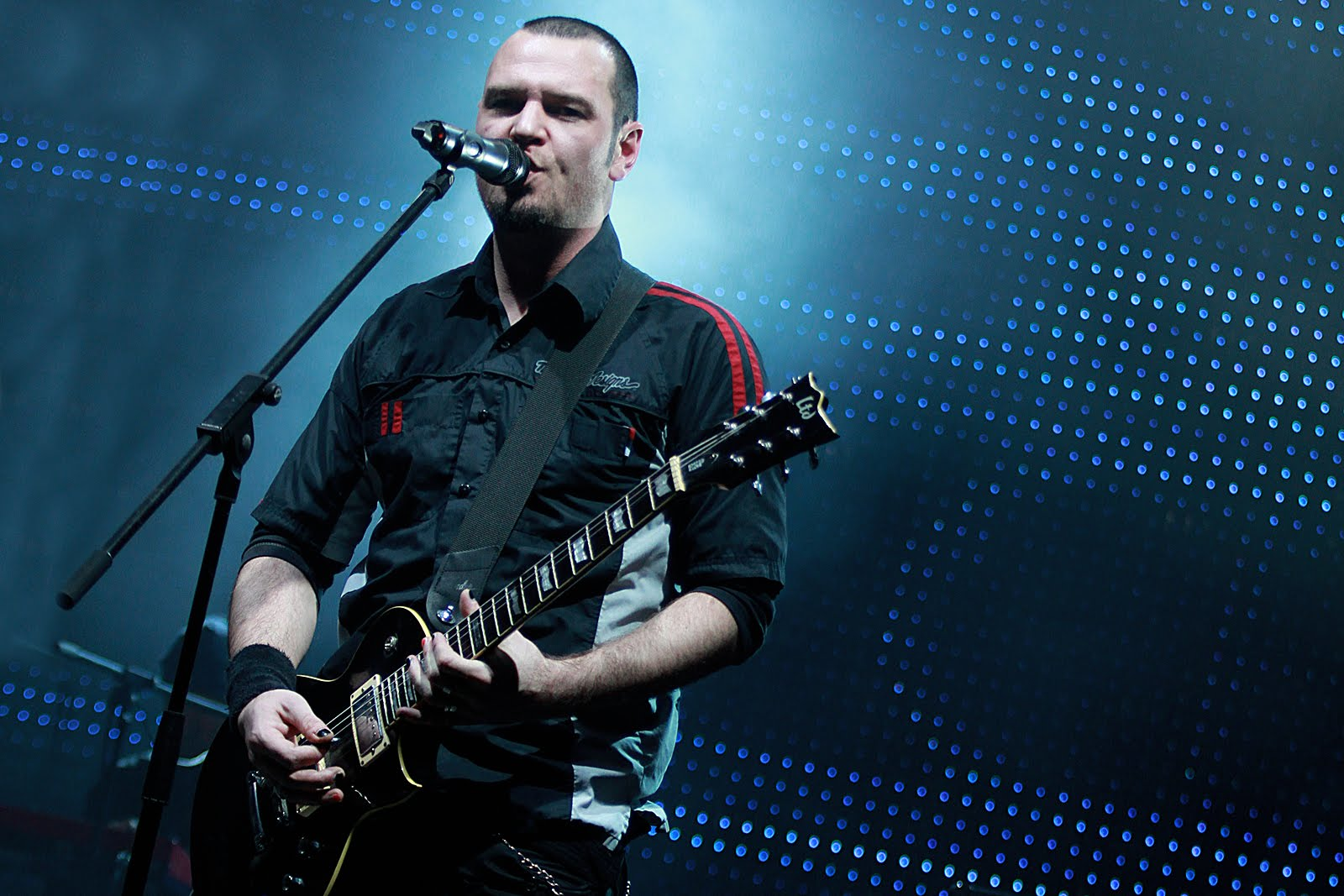
Tomi Meglič, vocalist and guitarist of Siddharta, 2011

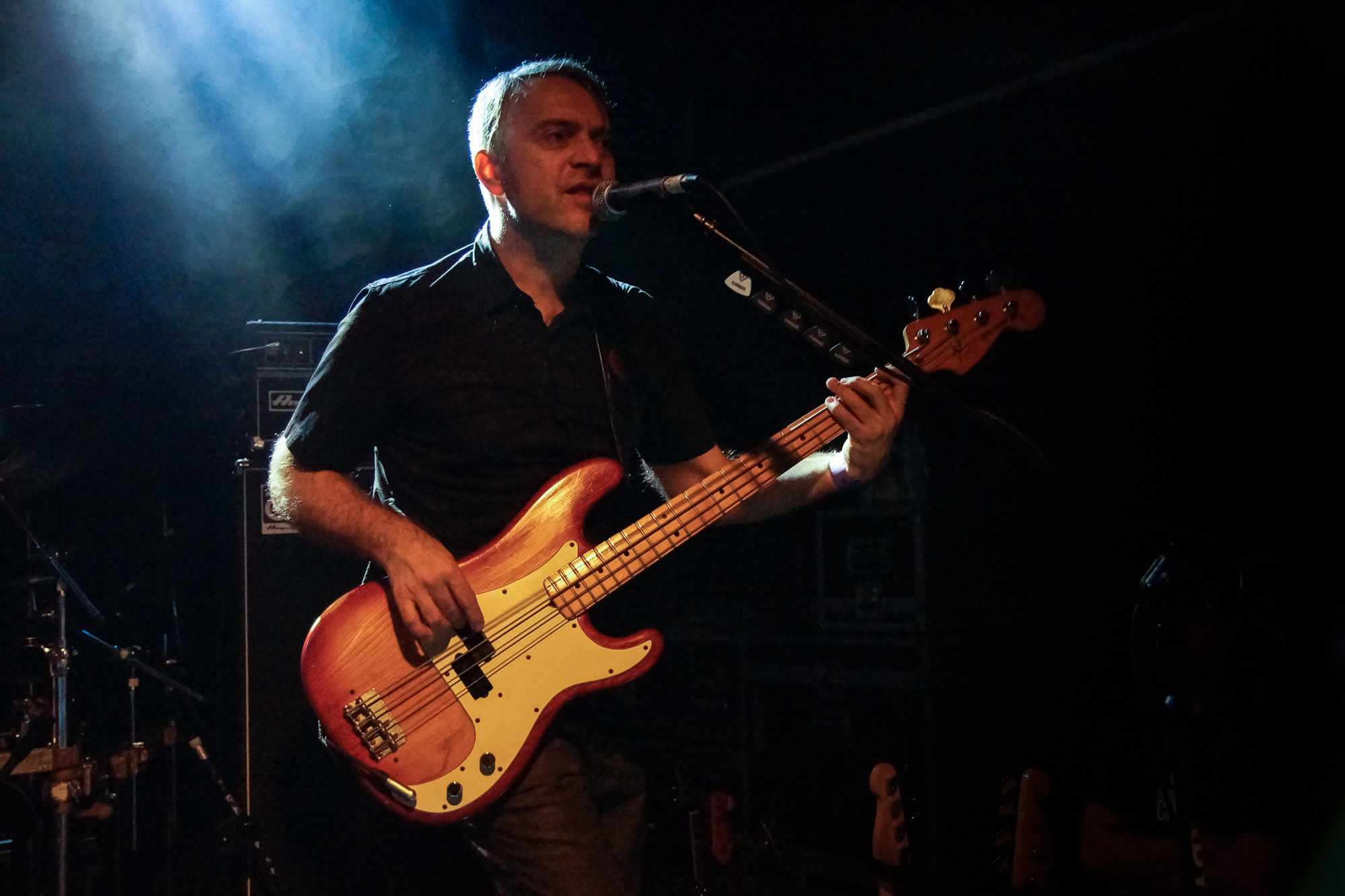
Jani Hace, bassist of Siddharta, Warsaw 2014.

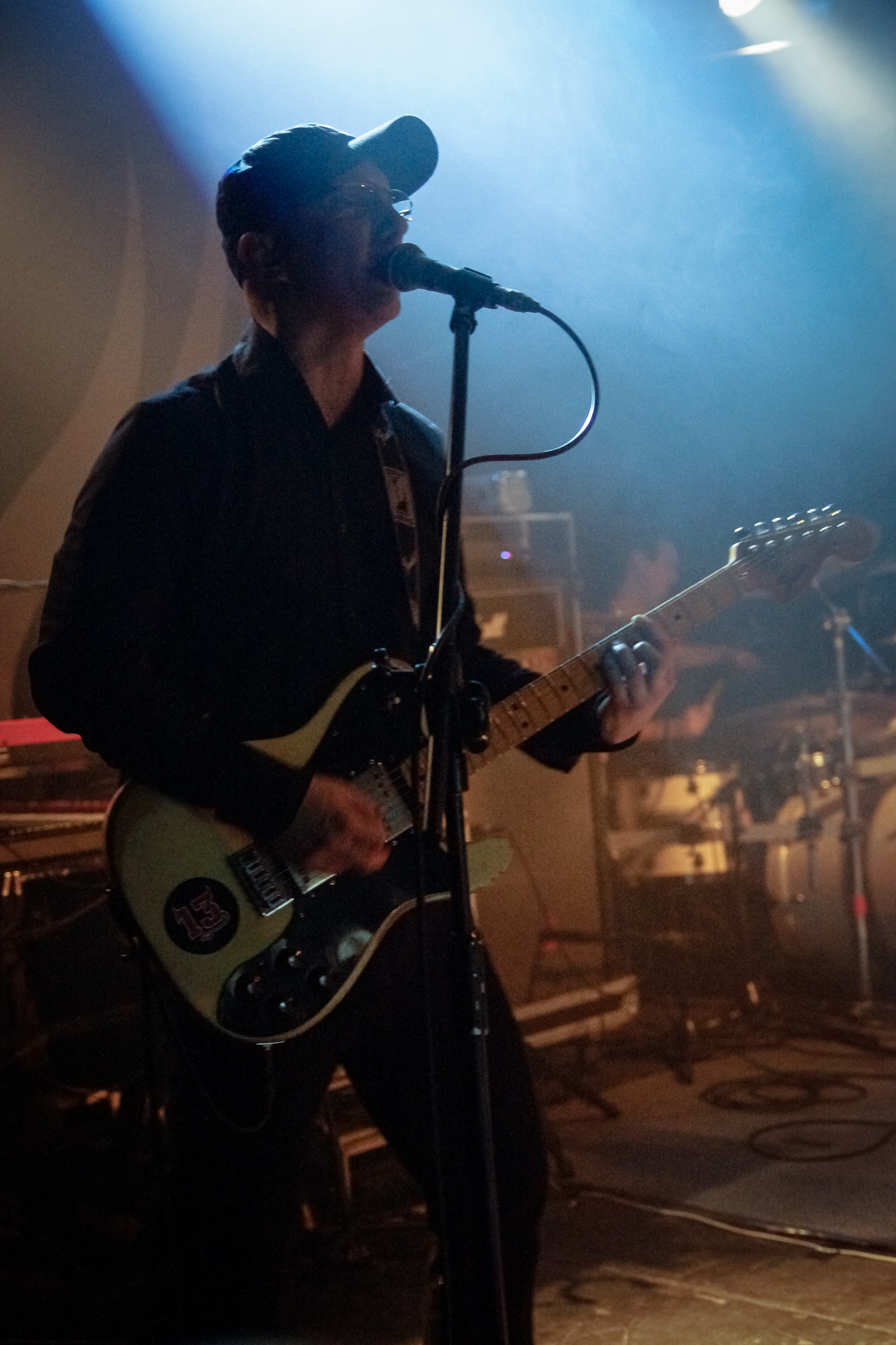
Primož Benko, guitarist of Siddharta, Warsaw 2014.

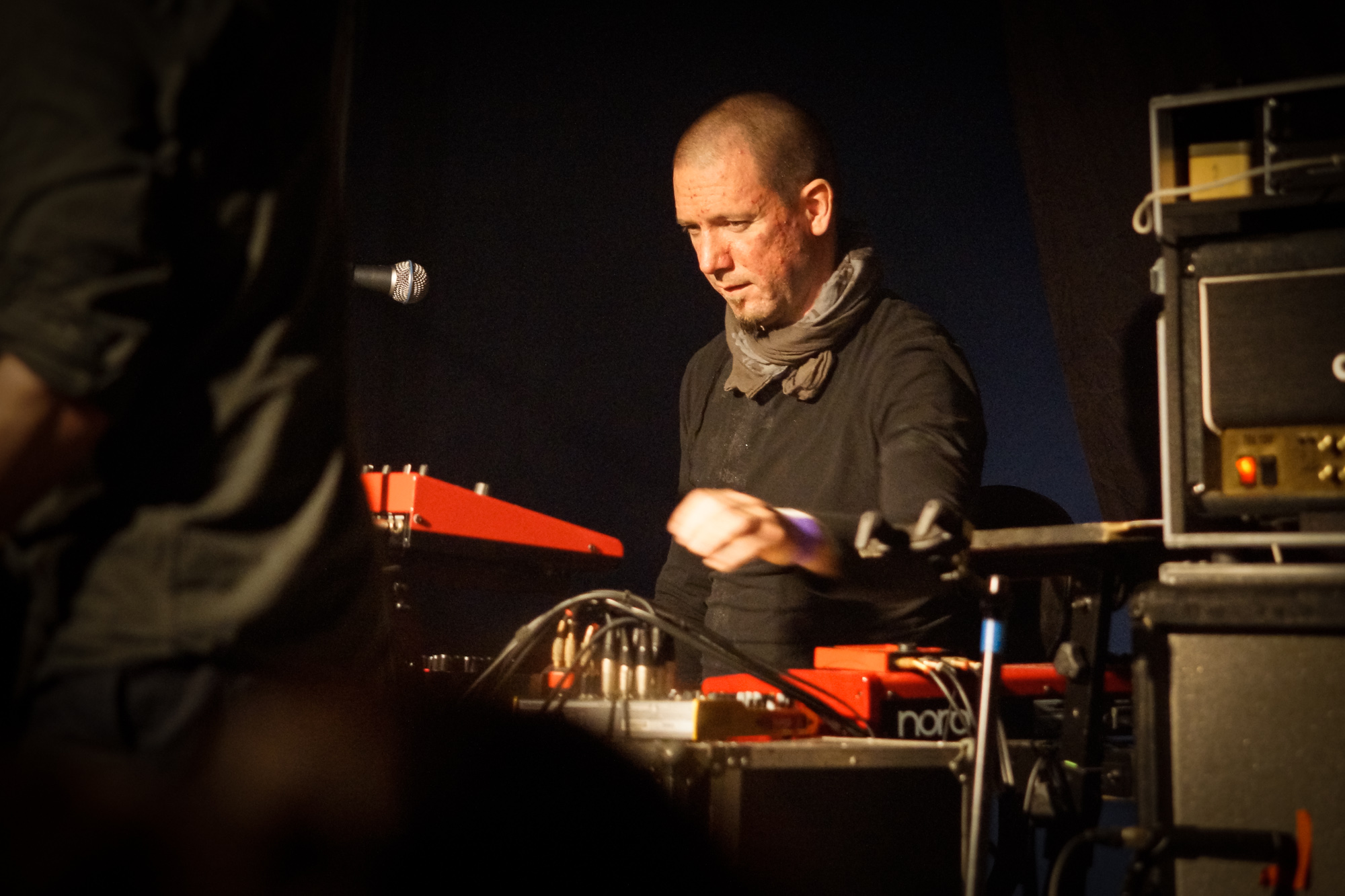
Tomaž Okroglič-Rous, former keyboardist of Siddharta, Warsaw 2014.

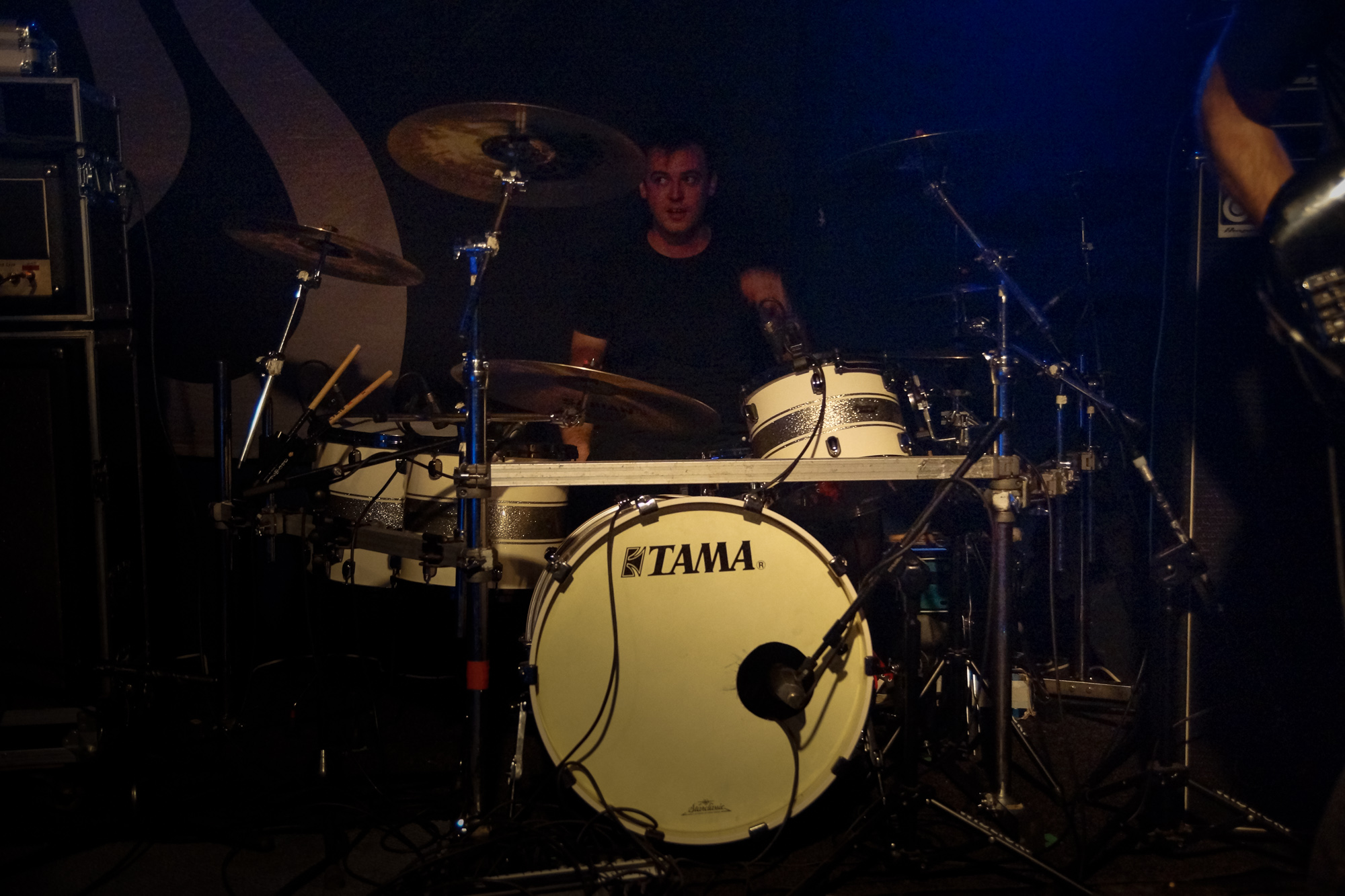
Boštjan Meglič, drummer of Siddharta, Warsaw 2014.

Siddharta is a Slovenian alternative rock band formed in 1995. The band's name is derived from the 1922 novel by the German writer Hermann Hesse, Siddhartha.

== History ==
=== Formation and Early Years ===
Siddharta was established in 1995 by Tomi Meglič (vocals, guitar), Primož Benko (guitar, backing vocals), Primož Majerič (bass), and Boštjan Meglič (drums). Their first public performance was held on March 17, 1995, at Šentvid High School in Ljubljana.

In 1997, the band participated in the Tivolski Pomp project, which included contributions from various emerging bands. Siddharta's track "Lunanai" was featured on the compilation and led to their debut television appearance.

=== Id (1999): First album ===
Siddharta’s debut album, Id, was recorded at Studio Tivoli with Dejan Radičevič and Anders Kallmark from April 1998 to February 1999. The band produced two versions of the album: one for the domestic market and another for the international market. The album cover, created by designer students Maja Bagić and Ivijan Mujezinović, received the Zagreb Art and Design Triennial award. Id went platinum shortly after its release, selling 13,000 copies.

=== Nord (2001): Second album ===
After their headline performance at Slovenia's largest rock festival, the Rock Otočec festival, Siddharta retreated from the public eye. Six months later, they released their second album Nord in May 2001. An English version was also recorded, for which Peter Penko and Žarko Pak worked as producers. For the recording of the album, Siddharta invited a bass player, Jani Hace, who later joined the band as an official member.

7,000 copies of Nord were sold in less than two months after the release.

==== Tour, lineup changes, remix album (2001–2003) ====
Siddharta won another Zlati Petelin award in 2001, the Music Group of the Year award.

In the spring of 2001, the band set out on an all-Slovenian stage expedition, playing nearly 80 live performances. In September 2001, their fourth video was recorded, "Samo Edini", both in Slovenian and English. After the launch of the video, the Nord sales rose 80 percent.

In November 2001, Siddharta filled the Kodeljevo sports hall in Ljubljana, making it their largest sold-out concert to date.

In February 2002, Primož Majerič left the band. Formally, Siddharta continued their work without a bass player.

In the spring of 2002, preparations for a remix album began. Many recognized Slovenian artists and DJs were invited to work on it, such as Laibach, DJ Umek, DJ Kanzyani, Jamirko, and McBrane. The remix album Silikon Delta was released in June 2002. Along with the album release, the "Under Venus" video – an animation video created by Testtube Productions – was launched, which won the never-before-awarded Viktor award for Best Video.

Siddharta won the Viktor 2001 award for Best Performer of the Year and Studio City's Bumerang award for Best Band of 2002.

The band concluded their Nord tour with a significant performance in Cankar Hall, supported by the RTV Slovenia Symphony Orchestra on 16 June 2002. The concert was aired live on national Radio Val 202, and the video recording was shown on national television.

At the end of October 2002, Siddharta recorded a commercial for Slovene mobile provider Mobitel, which aired on MTV Europe. For the commercial Siddharta's remake of Vlado Kreslin's song Od Višine Se Zvrti was used. In March 2003, Jani Hace became a full member of the band.

=== Rh- (2003): Third album ===
The band started their studio work in December 2002 and in July 2003, Siddharta and Multimedia Records, with whom they had released all of their previous albums, agreed to discontinue their cooperation. The band thanked Multimedia Records for the support received on their way and proceeded to work with KifKif Records, announcing the release of the new album.

The studio work lasted many months, during which they had worked with Peter Penko, Dali Strniša, Rok Golob and Žare Pak. On 13 August 2003, Siddharta's third studio album Rh- was released with KifKif Records. The release of the album had been preceded by the single Rave. Directed by Petar Pašić, the video for Rave was recorded in Belgrade. The video was a success on national charts and was played on MTV within the World Chart Express. An English version of the album was recorded and released on Slovenian market as a special limited-edition album on 1 September 2003. The album was released in packages which resembled blood-bags, and they were placed in music stores on transfusion hangers. The special-edition album was released in 1,500 copies, which were sold out in a matter of days.

==== Rh- tour ====
A month after the release of their third studio album Rh-, Siddharta opened the Rh- tour with a concert on Ljubljana's central football stadium, Stadion Bežigrad. On 13 September 2003, Siddharta, accompanied by the RTV Slovenia Symphony Orchestra and 60 dancers, played before a crowd of over 30,000 people.

The preparations for the project had begun months beforehand, from careful stage-planning to the choreography and music arrangements for the orchestra. The choreography was directed by Miha Krušič (choreographer for the Go Easy video) and the music arrangements to Milko Lazar and Slavko Avsenik Jr (who had previously worked on the arrangements for the 2002 Križanke concert).

Playing two to three times a week, the Rh- tour visited all parts of the country, took a detour to Austria for a day, and ended just after Christmas in a sold-out concert. The stadium concert was aired on both national radio and television in prime time during the New Year holidays. It received a positive response from the media and was labelled event of the year 2003 numerous times.

=== MTV and other awards ===
In February 2004, MTV Europe chose to use Siddharta's My Dice for the new music chart show The Rock Chart jingle.

In March 2004, the special-edition Rh- packaging and its designer, Sašo Dornik, won the Grand award of the 13th Slovene Advertising Festival (SOF) in the category of miscellaneous means of advertising.

At 2004 Viktor awards, Siddharta won: the fan-voted Popularity Viktor and the Viktor award for Special Achievements, a public recognition of the stadium concert success.

The special-edition Rh- packaging had a new success at the Magdalena International Festival of Creative Communication; in the category of Other Means of Communication, the international jury presented its creator Sašo Dornik with first prize, the Golden Bra award.

In June 2004, Menart Records presented to their bands achievements and popularity awards. Siddharta won the highest possible recognition of sales in Slovenia named a Diamond record. Siddharta expressed their deep gratitude to their devoted fans for all the support they had received from them.

Siddharta's special-edition CD bloodbag package has been entered to the Cresta (the world's most prestigious designer and advertising awards program) short-list of finalists.

After its world premiere on Monday 13 September 2004, Siddharta's latest video 'My Dice' was aired exclusively on MTV Europe for a week, also marked by being MTV's Artist of the Week. Since 20 September it had also been aired on other music TV stations, and the 'My Dice' single aired on radio stations across Europe.

Siddharta decided to go on a mini tour across Slovenia at the end of 2004.

=== MTV EMA ===
Spring 2005 brought the release of the international Rh- album and new public recognitions. Siddharta was voted another Band-of-the-Year Viktor award by their domestic audience and received a nomination for MTV's Europe Music Award (EMA). From the EMA awards show in Lisbon, Siddharta returned with an EMA of their own: the Best Adriatic Act EMA 2005.

=== Rh- (English, 2005) ===
The English version of Rh-, which had already been released as the bloodbag limited edition in 2003, was remade and re-released internationally in spring 2005. The lyrics had been altered and a vocal coach hired.

The album was released in Germany, Austria, Switzerland, Poland, Croatia and Slovenia in two different versions: the regular English edition and the special edition with a bonus DVD. The DVD included Siddharta's videos Rave, Insane and My Dice, making-of documentaries, live videos recorded at their stadium concerts, band photos and an exclusive interview, in which the band presented their own view of their music of the past, present and future, the music scene in the band's home country, Slovenia, their music influences, their fan base, their past albums and plans for the future. They took some time to reflect on their creative process and the way they felt it would change for the next album. They described it as going back to their roots.

Both covers were designed by the award-winning Sašo Dornik and his Ventilator team. For the special edition, a different concept than the one that was used for the regular edition was used.

Reviews from many places around the world were favourable and positive.

In the summer of 2005, the band went on their first abroad tour, a club tour across Germany. The band's fan base grew by the show and their satisfaction peaked in performing before a club full of German fans in Berlin.

The band performed at large national music festivals such as Rock Otočec and Piše se leto in 2005. Fan votes won Siddharta the fourth popularity Viktor.

In 2005, Siddharta performed for the first time before an international audience at the Exit festival in Novi Sad, Serbia.

Siddharta received their first international recognition for their work: in Lisbon, Portugal they were awarded their first MTV European Music Award (EMA) for Best Act in November 2005.

=== Petrolea (2006): Fourth album ===
Almost three years after the release of their last studio album, Siddharta returned with Petrolea, an album much different in sound and arrangement from its symphony-based predecessor. A selection of domestic and foreign studios, combined with the experienced ear of Žare Pak and the musical perfectionism of the band members offered Slovenia an album marked by many a critic as album of the year 2006.

Siddharta performed an opening concert at the Ljubljana Castle during 2006.

Autumn 2006 was spent on the road, as Siddharta played 22 indoor concerts and a tour-closing concert in Ljubljana's Prešeren Square just before the new year. The latter was filmed by national TV stations in order to air it a few days afterwards. Young promising Slovene bands opened for Siddharta throughout the tour.

The band was yet again nominated for the MTV EMA, and it received the Viktor award for Artist of the Year. It was at this Viktor awards show that Siddharta and Dan D premiered in performing "Male Roke / Voda". The hit remained on top of music charts for most of 2007.

The spring of 2007 was spent performing concerts. Over 30 shows, among these one for Slovenes living in Italy and one for those in Vienna, were performed. They played at most Slovenian summer festivals.

=== Male Roke (EP, 2007) ===
Siddharta's cooperation with Dan D was marked by the release of the Male Roke EP, which included the aforementioned duet, the original title song and four live numbers. As with the Petrolea cover design, the Male Roke cover design was designed by Sašo Dornik and his Ventilator creative group.

=== Izštekani (live – unplugged, 2007) ===
Eight years after their first performance on the radio show Izštekani (Unplugged), hosted by Jure Longyka, Siddharta were invited to perform live for a second time. The acoustic versions of selected numbers from all four albums were later released as a CD + bonus DVD. The CD contained the performed songs only, while the DVD featured the whole show recorded live on camera.

=== Maraton (live, 2007) ===
Siddharta performed in Ljubljana's Hala Tivoli, with the show selling out within a couple of weeks. The band – with assistance from other musicians – performed their whole set-list, a total of 56 songs, and was on stage for around 5 hours. Siddharta's first bass player Primož Majerič, Big Foot Mama's singer Grega Skočir, rapper Nikolovski, legend of Slovenian rock music Vlado Kreslin and string quartet Godalika joined them on stage.

The concert was released in December as a collection of four CDs with a bonus DVD, which featured a documentary on the occurrences both within and outside the hall, both before and during the Marathon concert. The documentary was shot and cut by Dafne Jemeršič.

=== Saga (2009): Fifth album ===
In the spring of 2008, Siddharta released a video for their song, Autumn Sun. The song had been only known and available as its own remix from the 2002 Silikon Delta album of remixes prior to this.

Cene Resnik, after over ten years as a member of Siddharta, left the band to pursue a solo artist career.

On 19 December 2008 they released an EP entitled Vojna idej (lit. War of Ideas, English title Battle of Bombay).

Ross Robinson produced the new album, Saga, which was released on 21 November 2009 with a promotional concert in Kino Šiška.

=== Siddharta & RTV Slovenia Symphony Orchestra (2013) ===
In 2013, the band released a double CD and DVD live album of their performance on June 17 and 18, 2013 in Cankarjev dom with the RTV Slovenia Symphony Orchestra.

=== Ultra (2015) ===
In December 2015, they released their 8th studio album, Ultra.

== Members ==
=== Current members ===
- Tomi Meglič – vocals, guitar (1995-present)
- Primož Benko – guitar (1995-present)
- Jani Hace – bass (2003-present)
- Boštjan Meglič – drums, percussion (1995-present)
- Nejc Škofic - keyboards, programming (2025-present, touring 2024-2025)

=== Former members ===
- Primož Majerič – bass (1995-2002)
- Cene Resnik – saxophone, EWI, keyboards (1996-2008)
- Tomaž O. Rous – keyboards, programming (1999-2023)

== Discography ==
Studio albums in bold.

Year	Title
1999	**Id**
2000	Lunanai EP
2001	**Nord**
2002	Silikon Delta (Remixes)
2003	**Rh-**
2003	Rh- Bloodbag (Limited Edition)
2005	My Dice EP
2005	Rave EP
2005	Rh- (Special Edition CD + DVD)
2005	Rh- (English Edition)
2006	**Petrolea**
2007	Male Roke EP
2007	Marathon (Live)
2007	Izštekani (Unplugged)
2008	Vojna idej EP
2009	Napalm 3 EP
2009	Baroko EP
2009	Angel Diabolo EP
2009	**Saga**
2011	**VI**
2012	VI (English Edition)
2015	**Infra**
2015	**Ultra**
2018	**Nomadi**
2020	ID20 (rerecording of debut album ID)
2024	**X**

== Awards ==
=== 2000 ===
- Bumerang award – Breakthrough
- Zlati petelin award – Best new Act
- Zlati petelin award – Best rock album
- Zlati petelin award – Best album

=== 2001 ===
- Zlati petelin award – Best group

=== 2002 ===
- Viktor award – Artist of the year
- Bumerang award – Group of the year

=== 2003 ===
- Viktor award – Video of the year
- Golden drum award – Rh- limited edition packaging design

=== 2004 ===
- Viktor award – Artist of the year
- Viktor award – Special achievements
- MTV's Artist of the Week

=== 2005 ===
- Viktor award – Artist of the year
- MTV European Music Award – Best Adriatic Act
- Diamond record for the Rh- record

=== 2006 ===
- Viktor award – Best Music Act

=== 2007 ===
- Viktor award for Artist of the year 2006
- Gold record for the Petrolea album
- Platinum record for the Petrolea album

=== 2008 ===
- Nomination for the Viktor award in the category of Artist of the year 2007

=== 2018 ===
- Golden Flute Music Award - Performer of the Year, Album of the Year (Nomadi), Song of the Year (Medrevesa)
