= Bosnian and Herzegovinian hip-hop =

Music genre or scene

Bosnia and Herzegovina hip-hop (or simply Bosnian hip-hop) is a style of hip-hop music made in Bosnia and Herzegovina.

Although quite a new music style in Bosnia, it has nevertheless proven to be very popular. The hip-hop scene has coalesced around several major portals on the internet. The center of hip-hop and hip-hop culture used to be only Tuzla, primarily thanks to the first radio hip-hop show and label called FMJAM and their crew, with the big help of popular rappers Edo Maajka and Frenkie.

== Recent ==
Today, hip-hop is more popular than ever before. Sarajevo, Tuzla, and Mostar are three cities that are the most popular ones today, when it comes to new releases, hip-hop happening,s and concerts. Artists like Mayer and crews like Malter, DoggSound, REVSKL, and HighTime are currently the most popular ones in Mostar. While in Sarajevo artists like Buba Corelli and from BluntBylon and crews like Capital City Crew, Treća Smjena Crew including Sajfer and Santos, G-Recordz, etc. belong in the category of the most popular and listened to artists in the country.

For the first time in the history of Bosnian hip-hop culture, it is possible to hear and find new songs and videos on TV, which was almost unheard of back in the 2000s. Media picture of hip-hop is growing with BHOP Portal being the most updated website when it comes to being the place to find everything that is currently happening in Bosnian hip-hop, and currently it is the most visited internet website that specifically covers the Bosnian hip-hop scene. FMJAM is the most popular crew and private 'net' label in the country, and their radio has been going on strong for more than ten years with DJ Soul as the main DJ. Facebook and YouTube still remain the main tools artists use to develop their fan base, because even though hip-hop has gotten more popular in Bosnia, it is still nowhere near the level of other popular music styles when it comes to fans, media coverage, and anything else of that sort.

== History of Bosnian hip-hop ==
In the late 1980s, a rapper emerged named "Elvir Reper", who never recorded any songs, but did actively engage in rapping and is credited as introducing hip-hop material from popular American hip-hop acts at that time.

Because of the war in Bosnia that started in 1992, hip-hop stopped for a while, only to be revived by what has become known as the second wave of hip-hop. Artists such as Alaga, Mr. Johnny (Sarajevo) Crni Zvuk, Kwonel and MC Fudo (Tuzla) emerged with numerous demo songs, played on radios, concerts, and became popular around their town of Sarajevo.

Numerous attempts and limited exposure on radio was a problem until 1999, when DJ Soul and Erol created the first Bosnian hip-hop station FMJAM.

With the help of FMJAM, the first songs were produced in a studio. After numerous shows, FMJAM helps create the hip-hop group Disciplinska Komisija, with the lead rapper Edo Maajka, who would lead the revival movement in Bosnian hip-hop.

A little later, FMJAM established itself enough to be able to create a website, on which a number of demo songs were released. With these demo songs and the organization that FMJAM provided, Bosnian hip-hop for the first time had an organization to rely on to have the resources available to provide for future acts and organize concerts and hip-hop gatherings for the youth.

Although FMJAM played a large role in organizing Bosnian hip-hop, it is recognized by the majority of media that Edo Maajka was the artist, with his 2002 debut album, that introduced hip-hop to the majority of Bosnia, thus allowing FMJAM to continue their work.

== Diaspora ==
Although different, Bosnian hip-hop has also proven itself very popular and successful throughout the United States. With the introduction of the group Slicc & Aone in the late 1990s and early 2000s, Bosnian hip-hop made its debut in the United States. The duo gained popularity quickly, which also opened up a new path to upcoming Bosnian-American hip-hop artists. Other notable Bosnian hip-hop artists throughout the U.S. include Rima D, Rnel, Prah, Opijum Veza, Gazije, Udarna Snaga, and KoCity RimeS.

== Modern hip-hop and auto-tune fusions ==
Today, we have many artists who emerged in the last 10 years who mix hip-hop with pop, EDM, folk, trap, and ethnic sounds. Almost all of them use an Auto-Tune to create a distinguished sound. Hip-hop artists like Future, Travis Scott, Young Thug, and Lil Uzi Vert use Auto-Tune to create a signature sound. The effect has also become popular in Rap music and other genres in the Balkans. The main Bosnian artists in this subgenre are Jala Brat, Buba Corelli, Sajfer, Inas, Cunami, Albino, SMA, Valderrama Flow, Medico, Mehdi, Loš Sin, Klijent, Arpino Sachi, and Franco Balkan.
