= Hladno pivo =

Croatian punk rock band

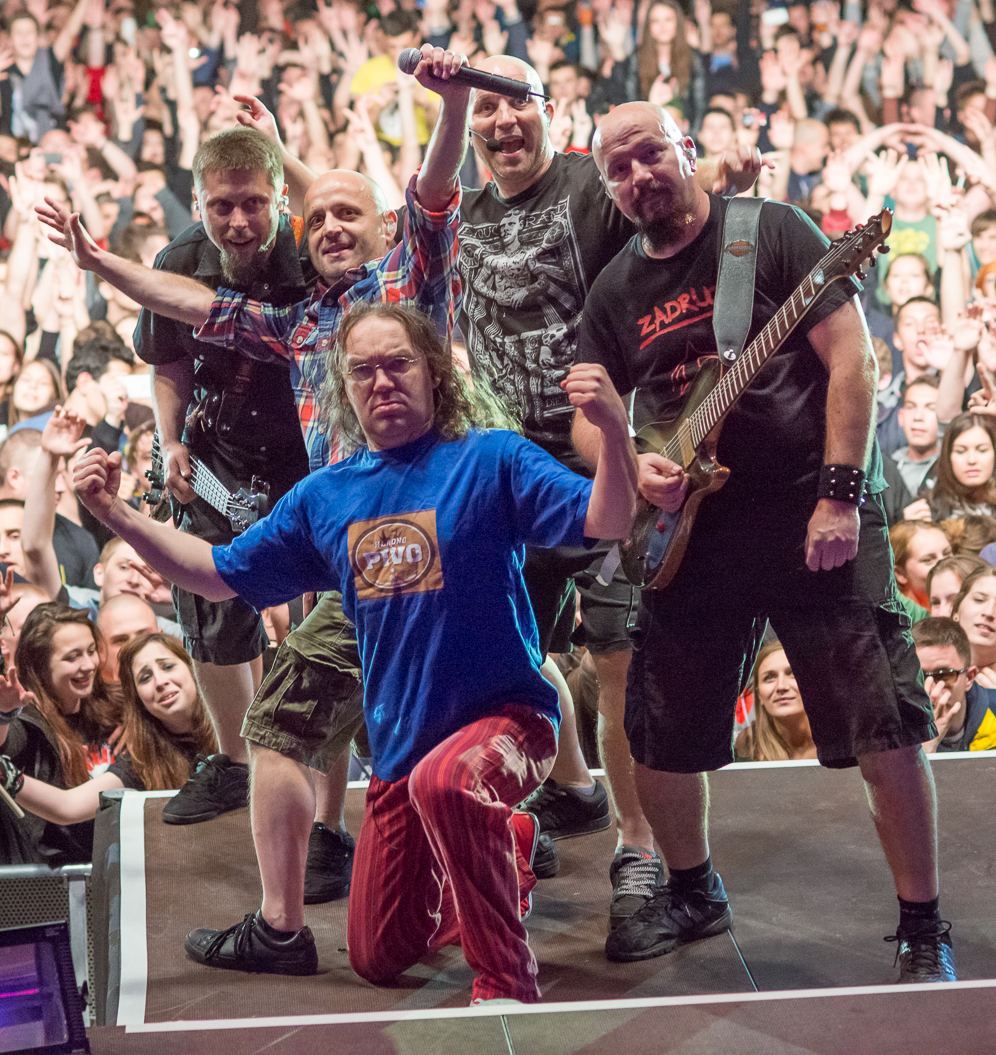
- The band in 2013

Background information
- Origin: Zagreb, Croatia
- Genres: Rock; Punk rock Alternative rock
- Labels: Croatia Records; Dancing Bear; Menart
- Members: Mile Kekin; Zoran Subošić; Krešimir Šokec; Mladen Subošić; Milko Kiš

Hladno pivo (pronounced [xlǎːdno pîːʋo]; lit. 'Cold beer') is a Croatian punk rock band. The recording act, fronted by Mile Kekin, remains one of the most popular rock bands in Croatia.

== Early history ==
The band was formed in 1987 in Zagreb, Socialist Republic of Croatia, SFR Yugoslavia. It initially consisted of five members: Zok, Tedi, Suba, Stipe and Mile. In their beginnings, the band largely played covers of the Ramones, Sex Pistols, Dead Kennedys, AC/DC, Motörhead, The Rolling Stones, The Beatles, Judas Priest, Azra, Zabranjeno pušenje and Električni orgazam.

On 21 May 1988 the band held their first concert in Kumrovec. In 1988 band has also held an unsuccessful concert at lake Jarun in Zagreb, due to the drummer of the band which played before them refusing to leave the drums for Hladno pivo.

In 1989 Stipe left the band (to form Falschspieler). This year was also important because Zok, Tedi, Suba and Mile recorded their first demo. The demo consisted of six songs: "Für immer Punk" (a Goldene Zitronen cover), "Bonzo", "Savršeni marginalci", "Niemals", "Buntovnik" and "Čelične zavjese". The demo was recorded at Jozo in Trešnjevka, Zagreb. One week later, Mile and Zok were sent to do their military service.

When they returned from military service in 1990 they started playing again. The result were the songs: "Princeza", "Heroin", "Dobro veče", "Trening za umiranje", "Buba švabe", "Zakaj se tak' oblačiš", and "Pjevajte nešto ljubavno". These songs were recorded in 1991 at Denis (a.k.a. Denyken) in Sopot, Zagreb. These songs, along with modified "Marginalci" were published as a cassette in production of Megatherium rec.

== History ==
Soon after Hladno pivo held their concerts in KSET and Video-teatar, they were accepted by the public. They soon recorded a music video of the song "Buba švabe" (remake of Toy Dolls' song "Spiders in the Dressing Room") in Mile's house for 200 German marks. This music video was broadcast as a part of a television music show called Hit-depo in April 1992. This allowed the band to be introduced to the whole of Croatia. The same year A. Dragaš and T. Šunjić offered the band to make a record as T.R.I.P. records. T.R.I.P. records had at that time negotiated with Croatia Records. The result of the collaboration was the T.R.I.P. zone compilation where Hladno pivo appeared with two songs. On 17 December 1992 in Ljubljana, Slovenia Hladno pivo opened for KUD Idijoti. The band also appeared at the Tivoli festival with Dr. Nele Karajlić and his fraction of Zabranjeno pušenje. The same year in November the band makes its first album – Džinovski at the Best Music studio, in Vrbik, Zagreb.

Džinovski was published in 1993 and was a hit. After Džinovski, Hladno pivo held about ten concerts in Croatia and Slovenia. In June 1993 Tedi left the band and was replaced by Hadžo from grindcore group Patareni. (Some informed sources claim that none of the former members of Hladno pivo had left the group, i.e. each of them was pushed out of the band in a very unfair and unfriendly way, leaving resentment for years after the event). After that the band started practicing a lot. While they were preparing for their next album, they held about 40 concerts across Croatia, Slovenia and a concert in Bregenz, Austria. In 1993 Hladno pivo was awarded the Porin music award for a best alternative rock album.

On 11 October 1994 Hladno pivo performed in Dom sportova, Trešnjevka opening for the Ramones. In February 1995 the band records their second album called G.A.D. under T.R.I.P. records – Croatia Records. The album G.A.D. appeared on the market in May 1995. On 19 January 1996, Hladno pivo held a concert in Skopje, Republic of Macedonia. In March 1997 the band chose Jabukaton as their recording studio and recorded their third album Desetka.

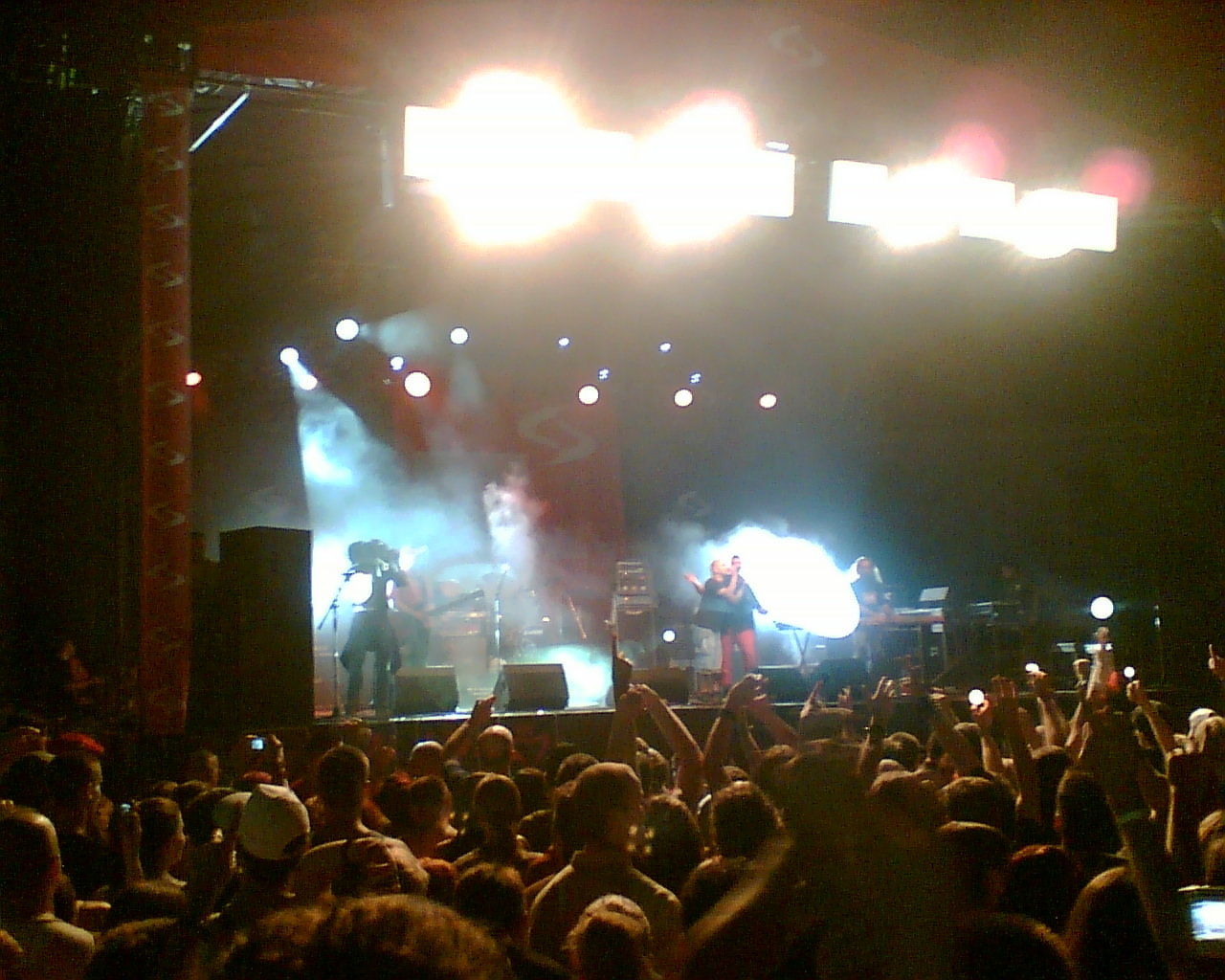
Hladno Pivo performs at the 2007 EXIT festival.

After the 12 December 1998 concert in Celje, Slovenia, Hadžo left the band and was replaced by Šokec (bass guitar). In 1999 Suba had to do his military service and was temporarily replaced by Matko from Makarska, Croatia. Their fourth album Pobjeda was recorded from 16 to 23 August 1999, this time under Gajba Records in collaboration with Dancing Bear. Gajba Records was founded because of the band's need to have better control of the recording of the album. The band had two new members: Stipe (trumpet) from Makarska, Croatia, and Milko (keyboards).

On 20 September 2008 they performed in front of 20,000 people on the band's 20th birthday in Zagreb.

In December 2022, the guitarist Zoran Subošić, along with several other Croatian citizens, including a human rights activist, was arrested in Zambia for suspicion of human trafficking after they allegedly tried to adopt smuggled Congolese children. They were later released from prison as no signs of human trafficking or other illegal activity were found.

== Discography ==
| Title | Released | Recording studio | Publisher |
|---|---|---|---|
| Džinovski | March 1993 | Best studio | Croatia Records |
| G.A.D. | May 1995 | Oktava – digital | T.R.I.P. records / Croatia Records |
| Desetka | 1997 | Metro | Jabukaton / Dancing Bear |
| Pobjeda | 1999 | Gajba Records | Dancing Bear |
| Istočno od Gajnica | 2000 | Live concert | Dancing Bear |
| Šamar | 2003 | | Dancing Bear |
| Knjiga žalbe | March 2007 | | Menart |
| Svijet glamura | April 2011 | RSL Production | Menart |
| Dani zatvorenih vrata | April 2015 | | Gajba Records |

=== Džinovski ===
Džinovski is the first album by Hladno Pivo. It was recorded in September 1992 and released in March 1993.

==== Track listing ====
1. Pjevajte nešto ljubavno – Sing something about love
2. Marija – Mary
3. Princeza – Princess
4. A što dalje – What next?
5. Marihuana
6. Buba švabe – Cockroaches
7. Sarma – Cabbage rolls
8. Für immer Punk – Forever punk
9. Dobro veče – Good evening
10. Narcisoidni psi – Narcissistic dogs
11. Marginalci – People from the edges of society
12. Zakaj se tak oblačiš – Why do you dress like that?
13. Heroin
14. Trening za umiranje – Practice for dying
15. Čelične zavjese – Iron curtains
16. Odjava programa – Closing statement
17. Buntovnik – Rebel
18. Niemals – Never
19. Outro

=== Desetka ===
Desetka is the third album by Hladno pivo. It was recorded in May 1997.

==== Contents ====
1. Nema više... – There is no more...
2. Tema je – žena – Subject is: Woman
3. Sex bez kondoma i zvijezda iz Hong Konga – Sex without a condom, and a star from Hong Kong
4. Ne volim te – I don't love you
5. 101
6. Grčenje ispred pojačala – Convulsion in front of amplifier
7. Krepaj, budalo! – Die fool!
8. Studentska – Student song
9. Anoreksik
10. Blagdanska pjesma – Holiday song
11. U sobi on i brat – In room he and his brother
12. PDOP
13. Roštilj – Barbecue

=== Pobjeda ===
Pobjeda (Croatian pronunciation: [pôbjeda]) is the fourth album by Hladno pivo. It was released in 1999.

==== Track listing ====
1. Kad ti život udahnem – When I breathe life in you
2. Svi smo ga mi voljeli – We all loved him
3. Debeli – Fat boy
4. Sastanak u parku – Meeting in the park
5. Šef gradilišta – Foreman
6. Pijan – Drunk
7. Trijezan – Sober
8. Politika (video) – Politics
9. Aleksandar Veliki – Alexander the Great
10. Bačkizagre stuhpa šeja – Zagreb's stallion rides
11. Svirka – Jam
12. Nije sve ni u pari – Not everything is in money
13. Madarfakersi – Motherfuckers
14. Motor – Motor car

=== Istočno od Gajnica ===
Istočno od Gajnica is the fifth album by Hladno pivo. It was released in 2000. This album is the first release of an Hladno pivo live performance. The concert was held in Zagreb, Croatia.

==== Track listing ====
1. Dobro veče
2. U sobi on i brat...
3. Kad ti život udahnem
4. Ne volim te
5. Buba švabe
6. Will the circle be unbroken
7. Šank
8. Debeli
9. Ljetni hit
10. Sarma
11. Rigoletto
12. Pjevajte nešto ljubavno
13. Princeza
14. Kristofor Kolumbo
15. Utjeha kose – Comfort of Hair (Antun Gustav Matoš) poem,
16. Trening za umiranje
17. Bečkizagre stuhpa šeja
18. Marihuana
19. Nema više
20. Roštilj
21. Mile, Suba, Šoki, i Zoki
22. Für immer Punk

=== Šamar ===
Šamar (Slap) is the sixth album by the Croatian punk rock band Hladno pivo. It was released in 2003.

==== Track listing ====
| No. | Title | English translation | Length |
|---|---|---|---|
| 1. | "Šamar" | Slap in the face |
| 2. | "Teško je ful biti kul feat. Edo Maajka" | It's hard to be cool |
| 3. | "Ljetni hit" | Summer hit |
| 4. | "Samo za taj osjećaj" | Just for that feeling |
| 5. | "Zimmer frei" | Free rooms |
| 6. | "Mlohava čuna" | Dullness of the weiner |
| 7. | "Soundtrack za život" | Soundtrack for life |
| 8. | "Štrajk" | Strike |
| 9. | "Cirkus" | Circus |
| 10. | "Čekaonica" | Waiting room |
| 11. | "Frizerska pjesma" | Barber song |
| 12. | "Dobri prijatelji" | Good friends |
| 13. | "Jednim osmjehom" | With a smile |
| 14. | "Par pitanja" | Few questions |

=== Knjiga žalbe ===
Knjiga žalbe is the sixth studio album released by the Croatian punk rock band Hladno pivo. It was released in 2007 by Menart Records.

==== Track list ====
1. "Couvert" (instrumental) – 1:32
2. "Carstvo pasea" – 3:13
3. "Nije sve tako sivo" – 3:46
4. "Superman" – 3:44
5. "Planeta" – 4:59
6. "Ranjeni i ludi" – 3:06
7. "Biološki sat" – 2:58
8. "Kaže stari šta nam fali" – 2:17
9. "Konobar" – 3:13
10. "Sreća" – 3:39
11. "Pitala si me..." – 4:01
12. "Džepni bog" – 5:01

=== Svijet glamura ===
Svijet glamura (English: The World of Glamour) is the seventh studio album by the Croatian punk rock band Hladno pivo. The album was released on 18 April 2011.

This is the band's first studio album in four years after their 2007 album Knjiga žalbe. Tracks were composed in January 2011 in Jelov Klanac near the Plitvice Lakes National Park and then recorded in February at the RSL Production recording studio in Novo Mesto, Slovenia before the final audio mastering was done at Cutting Room Studios in Stockholm, Sweden.

The band's frontman Mile Kekin described the album's sound as influenced by the music of Foo Fighters and Gogol Bordello.

The album's first single was "Ezoterija", released simultaneously in all six ex-Yugoslav countries.

==== Track listing ====
1. "Svijet glamura"
2. "Ima da te lajkam"
3. "Fotoaparat"
4. "Premali grad"
5. "Evo mene na ručku"
6. "Pravo ja"
7. "Kirbaj i kotlovina"
8. "Može"
9. "Lift"
10. "Bilo koji broj"
11. "Slobodni pad"
12. "Ezoterija"

== Awards ==
- Porin 1993 – Best Alternative Rock Album (Džinovski)
- Porin 2000 – Best Video ("Politika"), Best Alternative Rock Album (Pobjeda)
- Porin 2004 – Best Video ("Zimmer frei"), Best Vocal Collaboration ("Teško je ful biti kul", with Edo Maajka), Best Group Performance With a Vocal ("Zimmer frei"), Best Rock Album (Šamar)
- Porin 2008 – Best Rock Album (Knjiga žalbe), Best Art Design (Knjiga žalbe)
- Porin 2010 – Best Art Design (Knjiga postanka), Best Video Program (Knjiga postanka)
- Porin 2012 – Best Art Design (Svijet glamura)
- Porin 2016 – Best Rock Album (Dani zatvorenih vrata)
