= Disciplinska komisija =

Bosnian hip-hop group

- Also known as: Komisionari, DK
- Origin: Tuzla, Bosnia and Herzegovina
- Genre: Bosnian hip hop
- Years active: 1999–present
- Label: Fmjam
- Members: Edo Maajka, Frenkie, HZA, Moonja, DJ Soul
- Past members: Koma
- Website: www.fmjam.com

Disciplinska Komisija (The Disciplinary Commission) is a Bosnian hip-hop group formed in 1999. Its most prominent member is Edo Maajka, with other members Frenkie, HZA and Moonja and their DJ/producer DJ Soul.

== Formation ==
Disciplinska Komisija was formed in 2000. The group started as a project from Edo Maajka, then member of the group "Defence", and DJ Soul, the host of the first Bosnian hip hop show Fmjam. The first half of the members come from the group Odbrana (Defence) and are Edo Maajka, Moonja and a little later HZA. The second half of the members came from the group Dirty Angelz and were Frenkie, Mirnes and Koma.

The group hardly ever holds concerts together, as each member has conflicts in their schedules, but all for them actively guest appear on each other's albums and represent their group, DK, and Fmjam. For about ten years, this group is still together and they still work together. This group makes up the framework of Fmjam, in which Edo Maajka has a lot of influence as he is the spearhead and creator of the group, the one who released his groundbreaking first album, thus first he was popular in Tuzla, then after his first album he became popular throughout the entire region of the former Yugoslavia. Then Edo released his second album in 2004, which went 2× platinum. In 2005, Frenkie released his first album, then Munja released his album with Defence the same year. In 2007, HZA released his solo album, now all the members have at least one album out, so they are concentrating on their group's album. With their new artist and producer, Mirnes.

== Members ==
The members are: Edo Maajka, Frenkie, HZA, Mirnes and Moonja. Their DJ and producer is DJ Soul. Koma left the group in 2005.

== Themes ==
"Komisionari" (as they are called), mostly record rap battle or just battle songs, but they are also known for their shocking social themes, which include criticism of the political situation in Bosnia. They got a lot of recognition with their songs "America 1" and "America 2", in which they attack American politics and George W Bush. They also featured guest artists, the most famous one so far was Sove.

== Songs ==
These are some songs by DK.

- America 1
- America 2
- Budi spreman
- Cuvam dale
- Jos jedan
- Prva bojna feat. Doppler Effect
- Druga bojna
- Tisina feat. Crni Zvuk
- Budi Spreman feat. Armija 2 Čovjeka, Rima D
- Ustaj
- Pokreni Se
