= Edo Maajka =

Bosnian rapper (born 1978)

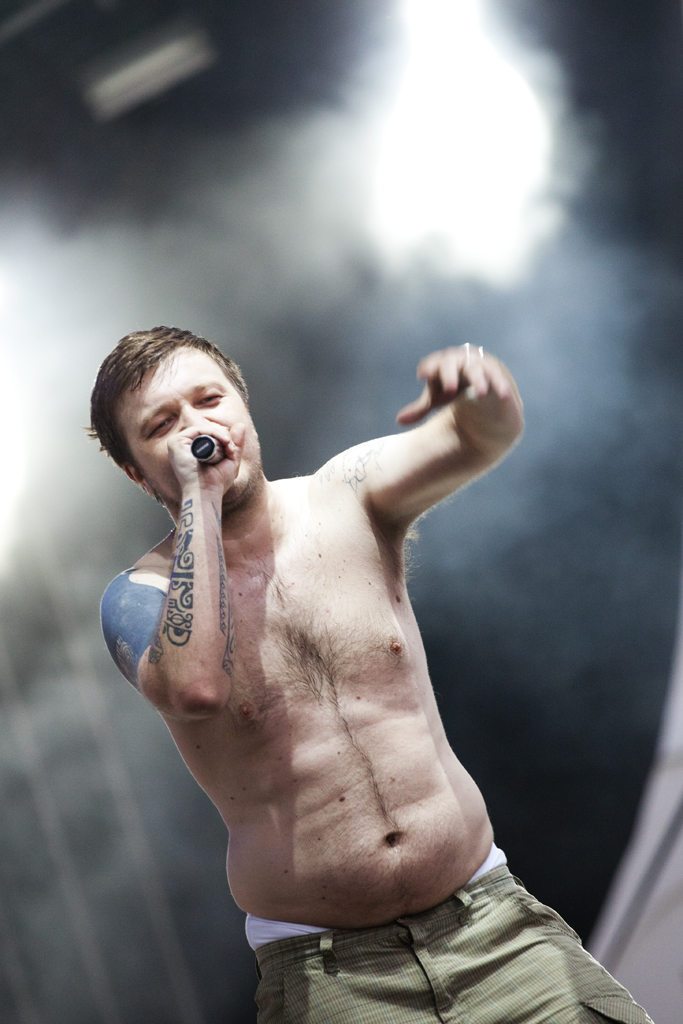
- Edo Maajka on the Exit festival in Serbia, 2012

Background information
- Born: Edin Osmić; 22 December 1978 (age 47); Brčko, SR Bosnia and Herzegovina, Yugoslavia
- Origin: Zagreb, Croatia
- Genres: Hip hop; funk; jazz
- Occupations: Rapper; record producer
- Instruments: Vocals; synthesizer; keyboards; turntables; drum machine; sampler; drum kit
- Works: Discography; filmography
- Years active: 1992–present
- Labels: Menart; FMJam; Hayat Production
- Member of: Disciplinska Komisija
- Website: www.edomaajka.com

Edin Osmić (born 22 December 1978), better known by his stage name Edo Maajka, is a Bosnian rapper, record producer and songwriter. His popularity brought his group Disciplinska Komisija to the mainstream. He resides in Zagreb, Croatia. He has released seven studio albums since 2002.

== Biography ==
=== Early life ===
Edin Osmić was born to Bosniak parents Azemina and Fehim, and raised in Brčko (at the time SR Bosnia and Herzegovina, SFR Yugoslavia) where he finished elementary school. In 1992, when the Bosnian War started, he left Bosnia and Herzegovina and went to Zagreb, the capital of Croatia, where he began attending high mechanical engineering school. After the war, he returned to Bosnia to study criminal law in Tuzla, but never graduated.

He took an interest in hip-hop when he was in high school and began to do rap battles at the age of fifteen. He also recorded a few demo tracks, creating his own instrumentals by beatboxing. He went to Tuzla and became a member of the hardcore rap group Diskord, later named Odbrana (Defence in Bosnian). The group became one of the best in the city of Tuzla and all of Bosnia. Their demo single "Odbrana '99" (Defence '99) was the hit of the year on the "Radio Hit" station in Brčko.

After a year of studying, he left school due to financial problems and returned to Zagreb to meet a friend (from the group Elemental) and recorded his first single "Minimalni rizik" (Minimum Risk) and, a month later, "Mahir i Alma". The songs were top hits on the Zagreb "Radio 101" station's show "Blackout" and the response was enthusiastic. The demo, "Mahir i Alma", became Kameleon's hit of 2001.

=== Career ===
==== Debut album (2001–04) ====
Osmić announced his debut album with the single Znaš me. He released his debut album, Slušaj mater, in the spring of 2002 under the Menart and Fmjam label. He released two more singles, Jesmo'l sami (Are we alone) at the end of 2002 and Prikaze (Spectres) at the beginning in 2003, which officially closed the album. He was featured by other artists, such as in "Teško je ful biti kul" by Hladno Pivo, "Rat" by Pioniri among others.

==== Second album (2004–06) ====
In April 2004, he released his second album No Sikiriki. On day one, the album sold 5,000 copies. He toured until the end of the year to promote his second album. In 2005, Osmić toured the US and Canada, visiting cities including Toronto, St. Louis, New York, Atlanta and Detroit, first time a Bosnian hip hop star was touring North America.

==== Third album (2006–08) ====
Recording of songs for the third studio album Stig'o Ćumur (Coal's Arrived) started in August 2005, and the album was released in March 2006. The first single was "To mora da je ljubav" (It Must Be Love) featuring Remi from Elemental), for which he shot the music video in Sarajevo. He started the promotion of his third album at the end of March, the day his album was released. The album peaked at number 1 on the Croatian Albums Chart.

In January 2007, Osmić 's single "Bomba" was featured in an episode of the TV series Sleeper Cell. In the summer of 2007, Maajka and his band decided to part, but remained good friends.

==== Fourth album (2008–12) ====
His fourth album was released on 25 March 2008. The album's name was changed from Sjeti Se to Idemo Dalje. In December 2008 the album received the name Balkansko a naše. At the beginning of June he announced that he had created a new band called TRNOKOP and the band premiered at the Rokajfest.

At the end of 2008, "Balkansko a Nase" came at number 36 of the year's top albums.

In June 2010, he released his best off album Spomen ploča 2002-2009, but he redid the album with his newly formed band, where they would use band instruments as the music and softer vocals.

Osmić was also featured as a judge and performer in the first Red Bull MC Battle that was held in Sarajevo, Bosnia on 23 April 2010. The next year, he was the host for the Bosnian Red Bull MC Battle 2011.

==== Fifth album (2012–18) ====
Osmić's fifth studio album, Štrajk mozga, was released in April 2012. The first single was Imaš li ti šta para, followed by the first music video and second single Panika, released on 26 December 2011. The third single was Džigera beat, followed by the fourth single and second music video "Facebook", released on 19 November 2012. The director Filip Filkovic Philatz, who directed both music videos, described the video being a sequel to "Panika" because it is set in the same universe, and is second part of the music video trilogy from the "Štrajk Mozga" album.

== Artistry ==
=== Influences and rapping technique ===
Osmić has named several artists that have influenced him, including Rambo Amadeus, TBF, Safet Isović, Miladin Šobić, Azra, Zabranjeno Pušenje, Disciplina Kičme, Atomsko Sklonište, Majke, Rupa u Zidu among others.

His rapping technique has been described as having a perfect flow, also his varied subject matter, connecting with his audience, carrying a concept over a series of albums and was praised for his ability to write lyrics.

His lyrics have also been described as a variation in connecting emotionally to the viewer. As Anur Hadžiomerspahić says "once you start listening to a Edo Maajka song, when you first start listening it hits you, gives you goosebumps and grabs you by the throat, then the very next verse makes you laugh".

=== Alter ego ===
Osmić has an alter ego or pseudonym that he names MC Berbo. He is described as a man who loves drugs, alcohol, fast and expensive cars, women and pop music. Osmić stated that the character of Berbo is the complete opposite of himself and that it is more of a joke than taken seriously.

=== Themes and lyrical content ===
Osmić started his career with storytelling songs with the demo songs of "Minimalni rizik" (small risk) and the storytelling/love songs "Mahir i Alma". He is known for his brilliant storytelling ability.

== Personal life ==
=== Business ventures ===
In September 2006, Osmić opened up a cafe bar called "No sikiriki", named after his second album. Along with beverages, the cafe also serves his favorite food, ćevapi.

Along with the cafe bar, he also plans to publish a weekly magazine which will only focus on positive things that are happening in everyday life and the music scene.

=== Legal issues ===
Osmić released his first single and music video for his third album, named To mora da je ljubav, before his album came out, in which his producer Koolade used the song "Cissy Strut" from 1969 by The Meters. Some media outlets have criticized him for plagiarizing the music in the song. Osmić answered back by saying "Sampling is not stealing. In hip hop you sample music, you take someones beat and rap on that beat. My album was postponed 1 week just because of that reason, while we waited for the authorization to use that song. The fact is that sometimes this waiting for authorization can be as long as one year, we redid the beat a little, gave credit to the author and not on us. You can see that the credit goes to the author on the inside cover of the album. Hip hop is made up of sampling, that is normal. On this particular track, Koolade is not named as the beat maker, but the author is. Remi, who is featured on the song, also gave a comment on the issue, saying that "That is not stealing, we are dealing with sampling of a already made song. You take one part of a song and combine it with your text. People who are not in hip hop don't usually know that this is a practice in this type of music.

=== Sports Hall Incident ===
Osmić held a concert in the Sports Hall (Dom sportova) in 2005. The sponsor for the concert was T-mobile Croatia. Osmić held a press conference before the concert where he criticized his sponsors for the firing of workers after they changed their "brand". He also explained his decision to work with a telecommunications monopoly by saying that he wanted his ticket for his concert to be 45 kuna or less. He added "you can only do that with a compromise, no one is criticizing Hladno Pivo that they sold out because their sponsor for the tour was Ozujsko beer, whose owners are also foreigners".

=== Concert in Serbia controversy ===
Bassivity (music label that released Osmić's album in Serbia) promoted Osmić's concert, which he was unaware of. When Osmić was asked about this in an interview for Svet magazine, he replied "I don't know where this idea that I will promote my album in Belgrade came from? "Bassivity" did that promotion on their own. I don't plan to go to Serbia, at least in the coming months. I don't want to go to a country that promotes the burning of mosques, and yet thousands of young people are howling on the streets. If I come to Serbia for an album promotion, which I promised to do, I am sure that it will not be for a while." Svet also tried to bring some of Osmić mistakes from the past to light, in which they stated that he was supposed to have concert with Mile Kitić, but they never revealed the source for that. In the same interview, Svet made some untrue and false accusations against Osmić and his family, saying that his brother and sister "live from black marketing in Northern Bosnia" and that his close family live of pirate sales from his own albums.

=== UNICEF's Education Action in Bosnia ===
Osmić was one of three artists that was featured in UNICEF's education program in Bosnia against HIV/AIDS.

=== Refusal to air music video ===
At the end of November 2005, a month after Osmić premiered his video for the single Mater Vam Jebem on MTV Adria, HTV and Nova TV refused to air that video spot based on the name of the song and some theorized because the song's lyrics were critical of the countries leaders and the media.

== Discography ==
=== Studio albums ===
- Slušaj mater (2002)
- No sikiriki (2004)
- Stig'o ćumur (2006)
- Balkansko a naše (2008)
- Štrajk mozga (2012)
- Put u plus (2018)
- Moćno (2022)

=== Live albums ===
- I Like to Dance (with Jazz Orkestar HRT-a; 2026)

=== Compilation albums ===
- Spomen ploča 2002–2009 (2010)
- Best od Edo Maajka (2019)

== Filmography ==
=== Documentaries ===
Several documentaries were made on Osmić's life and career. Croatian Radiotelevision's documentary Edo Maajka - Sevdah o Rodama premiered 27 July 2007 at the Motovun Film Festival.

Film
Year	Title	Role	Notes
2003	Trajno Nastanjeni Stranac	Himself	
2007	Edo Maajka - Sevdah o Rodama	Himself	

=== Movies ===
Film
Year	Title	Role	Notes
2003	Bore Lee: Čuvaj se Sinjske Ruke	Himself	

==== Animated ====
Film
Year	Title	Role	Notes
2003	Brother Bear	Tuke	voice (in Bosnian)
2005	Chicken Little	Mayor Turkey Lurkey	voice (in Bosnian)
2006	Ice Age: The Meltdown	Sid	voice (in Bosnian/Croatian)
2009	Ice Age: Dawn of the Dinosaurs	Sid	voice (in Bosnian/Croatian)
2010	Animals United		voice (in Bosnian)
2012	Ice Age: Continental Drift	Sid	voice (in Bosnian/Croatian)
2016	Ice Age: Collision Course	Sid	voice (in Bosnian/Croatian)

== Awards ==
Davorin/Indexi Awards

Year	Nominated works	Award	Result
2003	Edo Maajka	Urban artist of the year	Won
2003	Slušaj mater	Album of the year	Won
2003	Edo Maajka	New sound	Won
2003	Znaš me	Video of the year	Won
2003	Slušaj mater - Edo Maajka and Dash	Best international collaboration	Nominated
2004	Teško je ful biti kul	Best collaboration - Edo Maajka and Hladno pivo	Won
2005	Edo Maajka	Urban artist of the year	Won
2005	No sikiriki	Album of the year	Won
2005	No sikiriki	Urban song of the year	Won
2005	No sikiriki	Song of the year (in all categories)	Won
2006	Hajmo rušit	Best song together - Edo Maajka, Frenkie and Hza	Won
2007	Stig'o Ćumur	Album of the year	Won
2007	Bomba	Song of the year	Won
2009	Balkansko a naše	Hip hop album of the year	Won
2011	Spomen ploča 2002-2009	Hip hop album of the year	Won

Porin Awards

Year	Nominated works	Award	Result
2003	Edo Maajka	New artist	Won
2003	Slušaj mater	Album of the year	Nominated
2003	Slušaj mater	Best urban album	Nominated
2004	Edo Maajka and Hladno pivo - "Teško je ful biti kul"	Best vocal featuring	Won
2005	No sikiriki	Best urban album	Won
2005	Pržiiiii	Video of the year	Won
2005	No sikiriki	Album of the year	Nominated
2005	No sikiriki	Song of the year	Nominated
2007	Stig'o Ćumur	Best urban album	Nominated
2009	Balkansko a naše	Best urban album	Nominated
2011	Spomen ploča	Best urban album	Nominated
2013	Štrajk mozga	Best urban album	Nominated
2013	Edo Maajka and Arsen Dedić - "Šta će reć"	Best vocal featuring	Nominated
2019	Put u plus	Best urban album	Nominated

Zlatna Koogla Awards

Year	Nominated works	Award	Result
2004	Edo Maajka and Lexaurini	Concerts held during the year	Won
2004	Prikaze	Best video of the year	Nominated
2005	Edo Maajka	Artist of the year	Won
2005	Pržiiiii	Best video of the year	Won
2005	www.edomaajka.com	Best website	Won
2005	Edo Maajka	Golden DOP of the year (Artist accepting of criticism)	Won
2007	Edo Maajka	Artist of the year	Won
2007	Stig'o Ćumur	Album of the year	Won
2007	Edo Maajka	Concerts held during the year	Won
2007	Stig'o Ćumur	Design and imaging of an album	Won
2007	Edo Maajka	People's choice	Won
2007	Stig'o Ćumur	Album of the year	Won
2007	Edo Maajka	Golden DOP of the year (Artist accepting of criticism)	Won
2009	Balkansko a naše / design by Communis/Ideologija	Album cover of the year	Won
2009	Edo Maajka	Artist of the year	Nominated

Crni Mačak Awards

Year	Nominated works	Award	Result
2003	Edo Maajka	Debut artist of the year	Won
2003	Znaš me	Single of the year	Won
2003	Slušaj mater	Album of the year	Nominated
2003	Edo Maajka	Urban artist of the year	Nominated

Year	Award	Category	Result
2006	MTV Europe Music Awards	Best Adriatic Act	Nominated
2010	MTV Europe Music Awards	Best Adriatic Act	Nominated
