= Elemental (group) =

Croatian hip-hop group

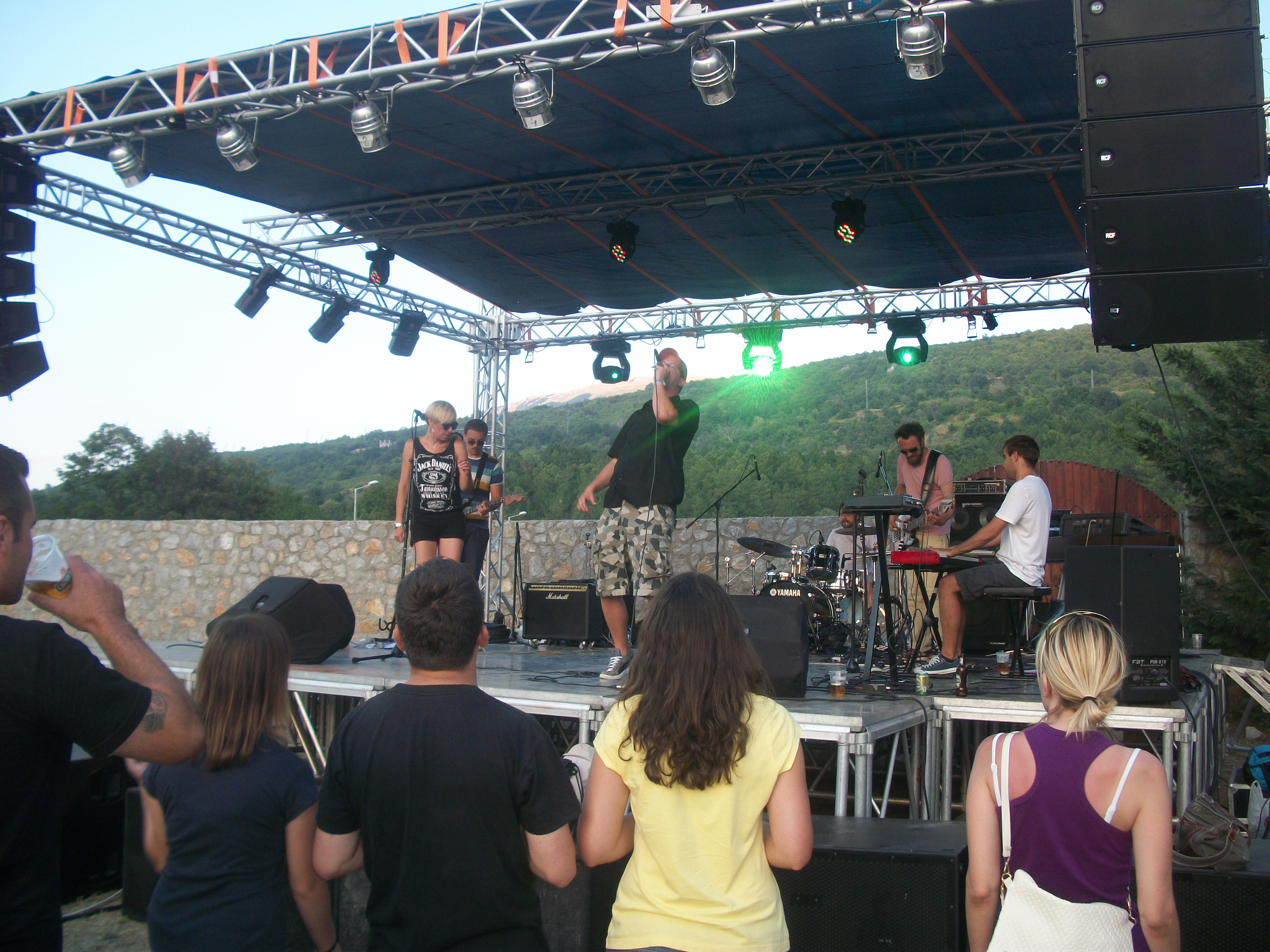
Elemental in Ohrid

Elemental is a hip-hop group from Zagreb, Croatia, founded in 1998 by Luka Tralić Shot, Gordan Radočaj Ink and Mirela Priselac Remi, one of Croatia's few female rappers.

== Awards ==
Year	Award	Category	Nominee / Work
2005	Zlatna Koogla	"Best singer"	Mirela Priselac Remi
2005	Magdalena	"Best music video"	Music video for "Tako lijepa"
2006	"Silver record" of the International Federation of the Phonographic Industry Croatia		Male stvari (album)
2007	Zlatna Koogla	"Music video of the year"	Music video for "Iz dana u dan" (Bruno Krčelić, Sebastijan Rogač)
2009	Porin	“Best album of urban and club music”	Pod pritiskom (album)
2009	Zlatna Koogla	"Music video of the year"	Music video for "Zašto te imam" (Kosi Kadar)
2011	Porin	“Best album of urban and club music”	Vertigo (album)
2013	MTV Adria Video Play Award	"Platinum"	Music video for "Malena" (Kolektiv Film)
2013	Porin	“Best album of urban and club music”	U redu je (album)
2014	MTV Adria Video Play Award	"Platinum"	Music video for "Bolji si" (Marko Milovac, C47 Film)
2014	MTV Adria Video Play Award	"Gold"	Music video for "Prokleta ljubav" (Marko Milovac, C47 Film)
2016	Porin	"Song of the year"	"Goli i bosi" (single)
2017	Porin	“Best album of alternative and club music"	Tijelo (album)
2017	Porin	“Best album artwork design”	Album cover art for Tijelo (Miron Milić)

== Discography ==
- Moj, njegov i njen svijet (Kondorcomm, 2000)
- Demiurg / Tempo velegrada (Menart Records, 2002)
- Male stvari (Menart Records, 2004)
- Pod pritiskom (Menart Records, 2008)
- Vertigo (Menart Records, 2010)
- U redu je (Menart Records, 2013)
- Tijelo (383records, 2016)
- ILICA (383records, 2020)
