= Frenkie =

Bosnian rapper (born 1982)

- Also known as: Frenk the Tenk, Frenkoza, Frenkzilla, Charlie, Frenkie Veličanstveni, Babukoni, Lack, Onion
- Born: Adnan Hamidović; 31 May 1982 (age 44); Bijeljina, SR Bosnia and Herzegovina, Yugoslavia
- Genre: Hip hop
- Occupation: Rapper
- Years active: 1997–present
- Labels: FMJam, Menart, Hayat Production, Universal Music

Adnan Hamidović (born May 31, 1982), known professionally as Frenkie, is a Bosnian rapper from Tuzla. His music often addresses the political issues of Bosnia. He has released nine studio albums and several EPs, including the EPs Pokreni se (2008) and #DNA (2015, with Billain) and the Bosnian-only album DOSTA! (2006).

Frenkie is a member of the rap group Disciplinska Komisija, which includes Edo Maajka, HZA, Kiing Mire, and Dj Soul. As of 2016, he performs with his producer Indigo and the Sarajevo-based rapper Kontra.

== Personal life and career ==
=== Early life ===
Adnan Hamidović was born on May 31, 1982, in Bijeljina, Bosnia and Herzegovina, where he lived until 1992, when the Bosnian War began. After escaping the war, he and his family settled in Nürnberg, Germany. While in Germany, he discovered rap music and graffiti. Influenced by German hip-hop, he began writing his lyrics in German. Upon returning to post-war Bosnia in 1998, he moved to Tuzla.

=== Early career ===
In 1999, he worked with the founders of FMJam from Radio Kameleon, DJ Soul, and Erol while in the group Prljavi Anđeli (Dirty Angels). The group released their first hip-hop demo singles during this period.

Later that year, Disciplinska Komisija (DK) was formed. The original lineup consisted of Edo Maajka, Frenkie, Hamaz, Mire, Koma, and DJ Soul. Frenkie contributed to two tracks on Edo Maajka's second studio album, No Sikiriki.

=== Recent activity ===
Frenkie's debut album, Odličan CD, was released in 2005 and included the singles "Bruce Lee Rap" with Baby Dooks and "Raise" with Defence. Frenkie's second album, DOSTA!, featuring producer King Mire from Brčko, was released in June 2006 and was dedicated to the movement of the same name. Singles from the album include:

- "Rat Savezu", dedicated to the Bosnian Soccer Fans "BHFanaticos" and their fight against the Bosnian Football Federation; a video clip was released for this song.
- In 2007, Radio Sarajevo 202 was fined 5,000 euros by the Bosnian communications regulator RAK for playing Frenkie's single "Mr. Policeman", a song about corrupt police forces. A video for "Mr. Policeman" was also released. In response to the fine, Frenkie released "Massiv", on FMJam, which criticizes and mocks the institution.

The title track of his album Povratak Cigana (2007) was released as a single on FMJam's website and features Hamza.

In addition to his solo work, Frenkie has been featured on Disciplinska Komisija songs such as "America 2" and "Ustaj", and on Edo Maajka albums on the songs "Ozezi", "Ne-Mo-Zes", and "Stvoren Za Rep".

In the summer of 2008, Frenkie's song "Soundtrack" (from the CD album Odličan) was used in the 2008 Marvel Studios film The Incredible Hulk.

Frenkie recorded a song with Masta Ace titled "Živili" which was released in his 2009 album Protuotrov.

Frenkie is part of the Diversidad crew. Diversidad: A Unique European Urban Experience is a collective album featuring twenty rappers, beat-makers, and DJs, including Frenkie.

To mark the 10th anniversary of his debut album, Frenkie released the compilation album Reexperience, which featured selected songs and new and remixed tracks.

In September 2016, Frenkie, Kontra, and producer Indigo released a collaborative album entitled Putanja. The album was recorded in the Berlin Red Bull Studios and produced by Indigo.

On September 10, 2019, Frenkie presented his book Koraci ('Steps') at a public forum in the reading rooms of the City Library of Zenica, as part of the fourth dokuMfest (a Bosnian festival of documentaries). He also released a book titled Lack-Made in Bosnia, which documents his graffiti career.

On November 8, 2019, Frenkie announced a new album entitled 20/20 (made in collaboration with Kontra and Indigo in Los Angeles-based Red Bull Music Studios/Red Bull Camp Stewart); it was released on December 20, 2019 and marked the 20th anniversary of the FMJam crew's existence. 20/20 features 12 songs, videos, and a short documentary and is the third joint project between Kontra, Indigo, and Frenkie, following Berlin and Tokyo. James Musshorn mastered the album, and Henry D'Ambrosio was the studio engineer. Recording was completed on October 1, 2019. The crew departed for the United States on September 8, 2019, from Spain, where they held their first concert in Lloret de Mar.

== Discography ==
Year	Title	Label	Certification	Singles
2005	Odličan CD	Menart/FMJam	Platinum	"Raise", "Bruce Lee Rap"
2006	DOSTA!	Menart/FMjam	N/A	"Mr. Policeman", "Rat savezu"
2007	Povratak Cigana	Menart/FMjam	2× Platinum	"Povratak cigana", "Ja ne znam", "Prepoznaj"
2008	Pokreni se	Menart/FMjam	N/A	"Pokreni se"
2009	Protuotrov	Menart/FMjam	Platinum	"Tebi", "Haj to"
2010	Featuring mixtape	Menart/FMjam	N/A	N/A
2011	Diversidad - The Experience Album	N/A	N/A	N/A
2012	Troyanac	N/A	N/A	N/A
2014	#DNA	N/A	N/A	N/A
2015	Reexperience	N/A	N/A	N/A
2015	Putanja	N/A	N/A	N/A
2017	Egzil	N/A	N/A	N/A
2019	20/20	Red Bull Camp Stewart	N/A	N/A

== Filmography ==
=== Documentaries ===
- Who the Fuck is Frenkie (released alongside his album Protuotrov, 2009)
- Soul Train (released 2015)
