= Menart Records =

- Industry: Music & Entertainment
- Founded: Menart Slovenia: 1994; Menart Croatia: 1997
- Headquarters: Ljubljana, Slovenia; Zagreb, Croatia; Belgrade, Serbia
- Products: Music & Entertainment
- Website: www.menart.hr www.menart.si www.menart.rs

Menart Records is a Slovenian full-service record label with partner companies also in Croatia and Serbia.

== History ==
Menart Records started in 1996 in Slovenia only, founded by Boštjan Menart.

=== Activities ===
Menart Records is the exclusive Sony Music license for the territories of Slovenia, Croatia, Serbia, Bosnia and Herzegovina, Macedonia, Montenegro and Albania.

As a domestic label, Menart has grown in Slovenia to the leading company in popular music – dominating sales and airplay charts with acts as Atomik Harmonik, Dan D, Siddharta, Tabu, Jan Plestenjak, Magnifico, Alya, Saša Lendero, Turbo Angels, Niet, Rebeka Dremelj and Kingston. Menart has established itself on the top of the Slovenian music industry. Besides releasing physical records, Menart has started in Slovenia the download site mZone.si (early 2008). On this site Slovenian and (on a limited scale) international customers can download domestic and foreign titles.

In Croatia Menart has worked in ten year the label to the top. Menart has established the following acts in the top of the Croatian popular music scene: The Beat Fleet, Colonia, Hladno pivo, Edo Maajka, Goran Karan, Karma, Letu štuke, Luka Nižetić, Matija Cvek, Pips, Chips & Videoclips, Lollobrigida Girls, Gustafi and many others.

== International activities ==
Menart has also managed to release (through licensing partners) various acts outside of the former Yugoslavian territories:

- Karma – a high profiled act in Slovakia and Czech Republic. Besides this the album Seven Days was released in China&Ukraine. Various singles were released on compilation CDs around the globe.
- Colonia: various singles have been released in Poland, Czech Republic, Slovakia and Eastern Asia. Besides this the album 'Najbolje od Svega' was released in Russia
- Narany: a high anticipated album is released in August 2008 and expects to be released various European countries as well
- Various songs from the Menart catalogue have been used in movies, commercials and TV shows; including the usage of Frenkie's song 'Soundtrack' in the movie 'The Incredible Hulk'

Menart is an official distributor for Sony BMG Music Entertainment and Edel AG.
