= Pips, Chips & Videoclips discography =

Discography of Croatian rock band Pips, Chips & Videoclips

- Studio albums: 8
- Live albums: 3
- Compilation albums: 2
- Singles: 35
- Video albums: 2
- Music videos: 37

The discography of Croatian rock band Pips, Chips & Videoclips spans more than three decades and documents the group's transition from early-1990s cassette-era releases to contemporary digital singles, vinyl reissues and streaming-first campaigns. It includes eight studio albums, three live releases, two compilations, two video releases, 35 album singles and 37 music videos across cassette, CD, vinyl, DVD/VHS and digital formats.

A recurring feature of the band's catalogue is its format variety: alongside standard album editions, Pips have issued limited and special releases (including a USB-based live and archival package) and have overseen a significant programme of later reissues on vinyl.

The band's earliest standalone release was the cassette single "Dinamo ja volim" (1992), with "Krumpira!" as the B-side, later contextualised by the band itself via its official webshop listing.

== Albums ==
=== Studio albums ===
Title	Details	Producer(s)	Notes
Shimpoo Pimpoo	Released: December 1993; Label: CBS–Interservice; Formats: Cassette, CD, LP	Denyken	Vinyl reissue (2021).
Dernjava	Released: December 1995; Label: GN Naklada; Formats: Cassette, CD, LP	Denyken	Vinyl reissue (2020).
Fred Astaire	Released: October 1997; Label: Jabukaton; Formats: CD, 2LP	Denyken	Vinyl reissue (2021).
Bog	Released: November 1999; Label: Dan, Mrak; Formats: CD, 2LP	Denyken	Vinyl reissue (2022).
Drveće i rijeke	Released: April 2003; Label: Menart; Formats: CD	Jura Ferina; Pavle Miholjević; Dave Fridmann	
Pjesme za gladijatore	Released: October 2007; Label: Menart; Formats: CD	Ivan Božanić; Pavle Miholjević; Jura Ferina; Dave Fridmann	
Walt	Released: May 2013; Label: Dan, Mrak; Formats: CD, LP	Ivan Božanić	
Vesna	Released: October 2023; Label: LAA; Formats: CD, Digital download, Streaming, LP	Marko Levanić; Ivan Božanić	

=== Live albums ===
Title	Details	Recorded at	Notes
Dokument	Released: 2005; Label: Menart; Formats: CD	Venue: Radio Val 202 (Slovenia); Date: 17 December 2004	Full release title: Dokument – Izštekani session 17.12.2004.
Poštar zvoni 2×2	Released: 9 October 2011; Label: Dan, Mrak; Formats: CD	Venue: Zagrebački plesni centar (ZPC), Zagreb; Date: 4–5 March 2011	Selection of recordings from the 2×2 concerts.; Promotional CD distributed with Jutarnji list.
2×2	Released: 11 November 2011; Label: Dan, Mrak; Formats: USB flash drive (2 GB)	Venue: Zagrebački plesni centar (ZPC), Zagreb; Date: 4–5 March 2011	USB release containing live audio plus archival bonus material (rare tracks, documentary, photo gallery).

=== Compilations ===
Title	Details	Content	Notes
Diskografija	Released: 5 May 2010; Formats: USB flash drive; Type: Compilation	Complete studio album catalogue (MP3); Demo track "Pjesme za gladijatore"; EP Klapa Bambi u carstvu zimzelena; PDF book Dugi vikend u zemlji čudesa and archival materials	Released exclusively via the band's official website.
Sve što vole mladi	Released: 10 November 2016; Formats: Digital; Type: Promotional compilation	Curated selection of songs	Promotional digital compilation released in collaboration with Radio 101 (Croatia).

== Singles ==
List of album singles, with year of release and associated albums
Single	Year	Notes	Album
"Dinamo ja volim / Krumpira!"	1992	Cassette single; B-side: "Krumpira!"	Shimpoo Pimpoo
"Mala fufica"	1993		Shimpoo Pimpoo
"Gume na kotačima"	1993		Shimpoo Pimpoo
"Mafija"	1995		Dernjava
"Ljubav"	1995		Dernjava
"Bolestan"	1996		Dernjava
"Poštar lakog sna"	1996		Dernjava
"Supermama"	1997		Fred Astaire
"Sex u školi"	1997		Fred Astaire
"Nogomet"	1998		Fred Astaire
"Plači"	1998		Fred Astaire
"Na putu prema dole"	1998		Fred Astaire
"Dan, mrak"	1999	CD single; B-side: "Middle Age Horror Show"	Bog
"Mars napada"	1999		Bog
"Narko"	2000	CD single; B-sides include alternate versions	Bog
"Bog"	2000		Bog
"Motorcycle Boy"	2000	CD single; includes remixes	Bog
"Ultraoptimizam" (feat. Braća Zelenko)"	2002	CD release; includes remixes	Non-album single
"Mrgud, Gorostas i Tat"	2003		Drveće i rijeke
"2x2"	2003		Drveće i rijeke
"Porculan"	2003	Promo CD	Drveće i rijeke
"Kako funkcioniraju stvari"	2003		Drveće i rijeke
"Rosita Pedringo"	2005	Unplugged version	Dokument
"Narko"	2005	Unplugged version	Dokument
"Nogomet"	2005	Unplugged version	Dokument
"Teroristi plaču"	2007	CD single (Večernji list); includes live bonus material	Pjesme za gladijatore
"Zdenka i vanzemaljci"	2007		Pjesme za gladijatore
"Idealna pop pjesma za astronaute"	2008	Promo CD	Pjesme za gladijatore
"Foxtrot"	2008		Pjesme za gladijatore
"Popravak"	2008		Pjesme za gladijatore
"Prvi joint u ustima" (Klapa Bambi version)	2010	Promotional release (Klapa Bambi collaboration)	Non-album single
"Htio bi da me voliš"	2013		Walt
"Bi li ili ne bi"	2013		Walt
"Trubač"	2014		Walt
"K1"	2017	Digital single	Non-album singles
"3PM"	2018	Digital single	Non-album singles
"Kung fu lekcije"	2018	Digital single	Non-album singles
"Nikad pa ni tad"	2020	Digital single	Non-album singles
"Ljubav 21" (feat. Edo Maajka)	2021	Digital single	Non-album singles
"Krumpira!" (feat. Iva Jerković)	2021	Digital single	Non-album singles
"Pariz"	2023	Digital single; remix B-side	Vesna
"Većinom"	2023	Digital single; remix B-side	Vesna
"SSND"	2024	Digital single; remix B-side	Vesna
"Gume na kotačima" (feat. Josipa Lisac) (live)	2025	Live recording — recorded at Boogaloo, Zagreb, 6 December 2024	Non-album singles
"Mafija 26"	2026	Digital single	Non-album singles

== Videos ==
Title	Details	Filmed / recorded	Notes
2×2	Released: 2011; Formats: DVD; Type: Live video	Venue: Zagrebački plesni centar (ZPC), Zagreb; Date: 4–5 March 2011	Live concert video recorded during the 2×2 performances.
Akustični Walt	Released: 2014; Formats: DVD; Type: Live studio video	Studio: Dan, Mrak Studio	Acoustic live performances recorded during the Walt era.

== Music videos ==
List of music videos, with year of release and video title
Title	Year	Director
"Krumpira!"	1992	Saša Podgorelec
"Dinamo ja volim"	1992	—
"Mala fufica"	1993	—
"Gume na kotačima"	1993	—
"Bolestan"	1996	Krasimir Gančev
"Poštar lakog sna"	1996	Krasimir Gančev
"Supermama"	1997	—
"Sex u školi"	1997	Radislav Jovanov Gonzo
"Plači"	1998	—
"Na putu prema dole"	1998	Mauricio Ferlin
"Nogomet"	1998	Radislav Jovanov Gonzo
"Dan, mrak"	1999	Mauricio Ferlin
"Mars napada"	1999	Jasna Zastavniković
"Narko"	2000	—
"Bog"	2000	—
"Motorcycle Boy"	2000	—
"Ultraoptimizam"	2002	Štef Bartolić
"Mrgud, Gorostas i Tat"	2003	Kristijan Milić
"2×2"	2003	Mauricio Ferlin
"Porculan"	2003	Mauricio Ferlin
"Kako funkcioniraju stvari"	2003	Tanja Golić
"Teroristi plaču"	2007	Radislav Jovanov Gonzo
"Zdenka i Vanzemaljci"	2007	Radislav Jovanov Gonzo
"Idealna pop pjesma za astronaute"	2008	Dalibor Barić
"Foxtrot"	2008	Radislav Jovanov Gonzo
"Popravak"	2008	Radislav Jovanov Gonzo
"Prvi joint u ustima" (feat. Klapa Bambi)	2010	Dalibor Barić
"Htio bi da me voliš"	2013	Radislav Jovanov Gonzo
"Bi li ili ne bi"	2013	Radislav Jovanov Gonzo
"Trubač"	2014	Radislav Jovanov Gonzo
"K1"	2017	Ven Jemeršić
"Kung Fu lekcije"	2018	Radislav Jovanov Gonzo
"Ljubav 21"	2021	Martina Meštrović
"Pariz"	2023	Rino Barbir
"Većinom"	2023	Radislav Jovanov Gonzo
"SSND"	2024	Radislav Jovanov Gonzo

== Other appearances ==
List of compilation, soundtrack and other non-album appearances, with year of release, album title and song title.
Year	Song	Album	Label
1992	"Krumpira"	T.R.I.P. Zone – Indie Rock Bands of Croatia	Croatia Records / T.R.I.P.
1994	"Mala fufica"	Music Pub	Crno Bijeli Svijet
1994	"Krumpira"	Dance Hits – Kiše jesenje	Crno Bijeli Svijet
1996	"Subotom uvečer"	Fiju Briju 3	Croatia Records / T.R.I.P.
1996	"Dinamo ja volim"	Music Pub Z. T. – Za ljubav tvoju	Radio Velika Gorica
1997	"Ljeto '85"	Mondo Bobo (soundtrack)	Aquarius Records
1997	"Subotom uveče"	The Best of T.R.I.P. Vol. 1	Croatia Records / T.R.I.P.
1997	"Subotom uveče"	100% Rock & Roll	Croatia Records
1997	"Sex u školi"	Croatian Rock Music / MIDEM '98	HDS
1998	"Sex u školi"	19 Sexy	Croatia Records
1998	"Sve moje frendice"	Mala antologija hrvatskog rocka (1963–1997)	Croatia Records / Suzy
1999	"Middle Age Horror Show"	Treće ljeto s Nomadom	Nomad Magazine
2000	"Bog"	Dallas Special 5	Dallas Records
2001	"Dan, mrak"	Otvori oči i slušaj	Radio 101 (Croatia)
2003	"Narko"	Croatian Phonographic Association 2003	Hrvatska diskografska udruga
2003	"Mrgud, gorostas i tat"	Alles Gut	Menart
2003	"Sve moje frendice"	Mala antologija hrvatskog rocka (Devedesete)	Croatia Records / Suzy
2004	"Nogomet"	Denyken 15	Dancing Bear
2004	"Mrgud"	Magnet New Music Sampler Vol. 34	Magnet Magazine
2005	"Mak"	Zlatna Koogla 2005	Menart
2006	"Ultraoptimizam" (Dashbeatz remix)	Voodoomix – Mixed by Frx	Menart
2007	"Teroristi plaču"	Urbanizam – The Best of Urban Music	Menart / Večernji list
2007	"Dinamo ja volim"	Dinamo u srcu	Croatia Records
2010	"Plači"	90e – Rock antologija	Scardona
2010	"Rosita Pedringo"	Bez rocka trajanja	Znanje
2011	"Zdenka i vanzemaljci"	Najbolje godine	Menart / Aquarius Records
2012	"Nogomet"	Made in Croatia – Navijačke himne	Dallas Records
2022	"Dinamo ja volim" (unplugged)	Music Pub – 30 godina	Croatia Records
2022	"Sex u školi"	Slavonija Fest CMC 200	Croatia Records
