= Ivan Božanić =

Croatian musician, record producer and audio engineer

- Born: 1976 (age 49–50); Split, SR Croatia, SFR Yugoslavia
- Occupations: Musician; record producer; audio engineer
- Years active: 2000s–present
- Musical career
- Instruments: Guitar; keyboards; synthesizers; programming
- Member of: Pips, Chips & Videoclips; ABOP; Meritas

Ivan Božanić (born 1976) is a Croatian musician, record producer and audio engineer whose work has played a significant role in shaping the studio sound of several prominent Croatian alternative and electronic music projects. He is best known as a long-time member and producer of Pips, Chips & Videoclips, a founding member of the live electronic act ABOP, and as a member of the pop duo Meritas, as well as a producer and mixing engineer on critically acclaimed, award-winning albums by the instrumental ensemble Chui.

== Early life and education ==
Božanić was born in Split in 1976. He began his formal music education studying guitar at the Josip Hatze music school in Split and later attended the School of Fine Arts in the same city.

Božanić studied audio engineering at the SAE Institute of Technology in London and returned to Croatia in 2003, where he began working professionally as a guitarist, producer, and audio engineer within the Croatian alternative music scene.

== Career ==
Božanić's career combines three interconnected roles: performing musician, studio producer and audio engineer. Much of his work has been carried out at Zagreb's Dan/Mrak studio, which is frequently cited in album credits and critical reviews.

=== Pips, Chips & Videoclips ===
Božanić joined Pips, Chips & Videoclips in the early 2000s and became a central figure in the band's later studio and live line-ups. In addition to guitar, he contributes keyboards, programming and arrangement ideas, and has been credited as producer or co-producer on several releases. On several Pips, Chips & Videoclips albums, he has been credited under the pseudonym Kardinal in liner notes and production credits.

His role in shaping the band's sound was explicitly acknowledged by frontman Dubravko Ivaniš in a long-form interview, in which Ivaniš stated that on the album Walt "Božo and Žaja did most of the work", directly linking Božanić to the record's production and sonic identity.

The album Walt (2013) received multiple nominations at the 2014 Porin Awards and won the award for Best Rock Album. Božanić was individually nominated for Best Production and Best Recording for his work on the album.

On the album Vesna (2023), Božanić was credited for production, recording, guitar and keyboards. A review in Nacional praised the album's sound, highlighting the "excellent production credited to Ivan Božanić", noting the clarity and strength of the record's overall sonic character.

A separate review in Muzika.hr described Vesna as a revitalisation of the band's sound, framing the album as a confident late-career shift supported by a contemporary production approach.

=== ABOP ===
In 2010, Božanić co-founded the live electronic band ABOP. Within the group, he is credited with digital synthesizers, sampling and live electronic manipulation.

Authoritative release notes for ABOP's self-titled EP (2016) state that production was handled by Božanić together with bassist Erol Zejnilović. Reviews of the band's later album △ (Delta) highlighted Božanić ("Božanski") as responsible for samples and synthesizers within the group's live setup.

As a member of ABOP, Božanić participated in the band's award recognition, including the Ambasador Award for Best Electronic Music Band (2017) and Rock&Off awards in the mid-2020s.

=== Meritas ===
Božanić is a member of the pop duo Meritas, appearing as a guitarist in the group's live line-up. Official credits for the concert release Meritas20 Live list him as electric guitarist, confirming his role as part of the touring ensemble.

== Studio work and production ==
In parallel with his work as a performing musician, Božanić has developed a substantial career as a record producer and audio engineer. His production work is most closely associated with Zagreb's Dan/Mrak studio, where he has collaborated with a range of artists across rock, electronic and instrumental music.

As a producer, he has been credited on multiple studio albums by Pips, Chips & Videoclips, including Walt and Vesna, as well as releases by ABOP and Chui. Reviews frequently describe his production approach as focused on clarity, spatial balance and the integration of electronic sequencing with live instrumentation, qualities highlighted in critical responses to albums such as Walt, Vesna and Zagreb–Berlin.

Božanić's studio work has received formal recognition through industry awards, including Porin, Rock&Off and Ambasador, both for albums he produced and for projects in which he participated as a band member.

== Discography ==
=== As musician ===
==== With Pips, Chips & Videoclips ====
- Dokument (2005) – guitar
- Pjesme za gladijatore (2007) – guitar
- Walt (2013) – guitar, keyboards
- Vesna (2023) – guitar, keyboards

==== With ABOP ====
- ABOP (EP, 2016) – synthesizers, samples
- △ (Delta) (2019) – synthesizers, samples

==== With Chui ====
- Zagreb–Berlin (2022) – guitar, keyboards
- Do zvijezda (2024) – guitar, keyboards

==== With Cherkezi United ====
- Petoljetka (2012) – guitar

=== Production and engineering credits ===
The table below lists selected studio albums and EPs on which Božanić is credited as a producer or engineer.

Year	Artist	Title	Role
2012	Cherkezi United	Petoljetka	Producer; recording, mixing
2013	Pips, Chips & Videoclips	Walt	Producer
2014	Pips, Chips & Videoclips	Akustični Walt	Producer
2015	Plastic Knives	Tongue in Cheek (EP)	Co-producer; mixing, mastering
2016	ABOP	ABOP (EP)	Co-producer (with Erol Zejnilović)
2017	Justin's Johnson	All In	Producer
2022	Chui	Zagreb–Berlin	Co-producer; mixing, mastering
2023	Pips, Chips & Videoclips	Vesna	Co-producer (with Marko Levanić)
2024	Chui	Do zvijezda	Co-producer; mix engineer

== Awards and nominations ==
At the Porin Awards and Rock&Off awards, Božanić has been recognised both individually and as a member of award-winning bands.

Year	Award	Category	Recipient	Result
2014	Porin	Album of the Year	Walt – Pips, Chips & Videoclips	Nominated
2014	Porin	Best Rock Album	Walt – Pips, Chips & Videoclips	Won
2014	Porin	Best Production	Ivan Božanić (for Walt)	Nominated
2014	Porin	Best Recording	Ivan Božanić (for Walt)	Nominated
2017	Ambasador	Best Electronic Music Band	ABOP	Won
2025	Porin	Best Instrumental Album	Do zvijezda – Chui	Won
2025	Porin	Best Album Recording	Do zvijezda – Chui	Won
2025	Rock&Off	Off&Off Act of the Year	ABOP	Won
