= Nogomet (song) =

Song by Croatian rock band Pips, Chips & Videoclips

Song by Pips, Chips & Videoclips

from the album Fred Astaire
- Released: 1997
- Recorded: 1997
- Studio: Studio Crno Bijeli Svijet (Zagreb)
- Genre: Rock
- Length: 4:33
- Label: Jabukaton
- Songwriter: Dubravko Ivaniš
- Composers: Dubravko Ivaniš, Tristan Karas
- Producer: Denis Mujadžić (Denyken)

"Nogomet" is a song by Croatian rock band Pips, Chips & Videoclips, written by frontman Dubravko Ivaniš with music co-composed by Tristan Karas. It was first released in 1997 on the band's studio album Fred Astaire.

According to music critics, the song presents an ironic and critical view of football culture, while its reception has often diverged from the author's original intent. A music video released in 1998 contributed to the track's wider recognition beyond the album context.

== Background and context ==
"Nogomet" emerged during the late 1990s, a period in which football occupied a central place in Croatian public culture. Music critic Ante Batinović wrote in a 2024 article for Glazba.hr that football in Croatia at the time functioned not only as a sport but as a mass social ritual shaped by post-war identity, media spectacle and commercialisation.

According to the band's official Facebook page, the central guitar riff for "Nogomet" was composed on 21 November 1996, during an impromptu rehearsal shortly before the group joined the large public protest in Zagreb held in support of Radio 101, commonly referred to as "Stojedinica".

In retrospective writing on the parent album Fred Astaire, critics have highlighted "Nogomet" as one of its most emblematic songs. Music critic Nikola Knežević characterised it as the album's "anthem for every football player and football watcher", while Filip Kušter argued that the proximity of the 1998 FIFA World Cup helped turn the track, conceived as a sarcastic take on football and an "anti-anthem", into mainstream pre-match hype music adopted by a broad audience.

== Composition and lyrics ==
The Croatian word nogomet refers to association football, known in English as football or soccer depending on regional usage.

In an interview for Muzika.hr, Ivaniš stated that "Nogomet" was conceived as an explicit satire of football and the surrounding social attitudes, and argued that the critical intent should be evident from the lyrics. He also recalled an early, ultimately abandoned idea to write a more conciliatory song addressing the rivalry between "Purgeri" (Zagreb-based supporters) and "Dalmatinci" (supporters associated with Split and Hajduk), two groups traditionally identified as major antagonists in Croatian football culture, but said the concept did not translate well into the final song.

Ivaniš further noted that the song was later embraced in contexts that ran counter to his original intention, describing this as a case of audience reception overriding authorial control. He added that he sometimes attempted to underline a negating punchline in live codas (including gestures signalling "no"), but that the dominant audience reading nevertheless prevailed.

In retrospective criticism, Filip Kušter described "Nogomet" as an "anti-anthem" whose guitar riff and sing-along quality helped it circulate as mainstream pre-match hype music, with the lyrical message often receding behind its collective, chant-like use.

== Release and versions ==
"Nogomet" was first released in 1997 as an album track on Fred Astaire.

According to the album credits published on the band's official website, the Fred Astaire sessions took place in 1997 in Ičići and at Zagreb's Studio Crno Bijeli Svijet (CBS), with mixing completed at Studio Tivoli in Ljubljana.

The song was later re-recorded in an unplugged arrangement for the Izštekani radio programme on Radio Val 202. This version was released in connection with the live album Dokument. A promotional CDr featuring the unplugged recording was issued in 2005.

== Live performances ==
"Nogomet" has remained a regular feature of Pips, Chips & Videoclips' live repertoire. Reviews of the band's concerts frequently note that the song is positioned as a closing or encore number, with pronounced audience participation and collective sing-along moments.

Several live reviews have also noted a variation in the vocal lead: in some performances, the song was sung by keyboardist Zdeslav Klarić rather than Dubravko Ivaniš. Reviewers have remarked that the track is still widely perceived as a football song, despite its original satirical intent discussed by Ivaniš in interviews.

According to performance records and documented setlists, "Nogomet" has been performed consistently by the band from the late 1990s through recent concert appearances.

== Music video ==
A music video for "Nogomet" was released in 1998. According to a yearbook published by the Croatian Film Association, the video was directed by Radislav Jovanov Gonzo.

The video was filmed at several locations in Zagreb, primarily in Novi Zagreb, including neighbourhoods associated with the band's formative years, with additional scenes shot on Stadion Maksimir.

The band later confirmed via its official Facebook page that actress Edita Majić appears in the music video.

According to the authorized band biography Dugi vikend u zemlji čudesa, the music video was conceived as a visual extension of the band's urban identity, with filming locations chosen for their connection to the group's early history.

== Reception and cultural legacy ==
In later critical writing, "Nogomet" has frequently been cited in discussions of football and popular music in Croatia. Writing retrospectively about Fred Astaire, Filip Kušter argued that the proximity of the 1998 FIFA World Cup helped push the track into the mainstream, even though it was conceived as an ironic, satirical take on football; he noted that the song was widely adopted in a celebratory, pre-match context, with the lyrical message often receding behind its guitar riff and sing-along appeal.

Ante Batinović similarly discussed "Nogomet" as a prominent example of how football-related meanings circulate through popular music, describing the broader social context in which football culture in Croatia functioned as a mass ritual shaped by identity, media spectacle and commercialisation.

In a 2018 column, Kušter described the song as one of the most striking tracks on Fred Astaire, arguing that it retained cultural relevance long after its initial release.

== Personnel ==
Personnel credits are adapted from the album liner notes.

=== Studio version (1997) ===
- Dubravko Ivaniš – vocals
- Alen Kraljić – guitar
- Tristan Karas – guitar
- Mario Borščak – bass
- Igor Paradiš – drums

=== Unplugged version (2005) ===
- Dubravko Ivaniš – vocals, piano
- Ivan Božanić – guitar
- Mario Borščak – bass
- Zdeslav Klarić – keyboards, backing vocals
- Krunoslav Tomašinec – guitar, harmonica
- Dinko Tomaš Brazzoduro – guitar
- Ivan Krznarić – drums
