= Dan, mrak (song) =

1999 single by Croatian rock band Pips, Chips & Videoclips

Single by Pips, Chips & Videoclips

from the album Bog
- B-side: "Middle Age Horror Show"
- Released: 1999
- Recorded: June–October 1999
- Studio: Studio Tivoli (Ljubljana)
- Genre: Alternative rock
- Length: 7:10
- Label: Dan, mrak; Jabukaton
- Songwriter: Dubravko Ivaniš (lyrics)
- Composers: Dubravko Ivaniš, Tristan Karas
- Producer: Denis Mujadžić (Denyken)

"Dan, mrak" is a song by Croatian rock band Pips, Chips & Videoclips. Released in 1999 as a CD single, it served as the lead single from the band's fourth studio album Bog and was issued on the band's newly established imprint Dan, Mrak, in collaboration with Jabukaton.

The single includes the non-album track "Middle Age Horror Show" as its B-side.

== Background and writing ==
"Dan, mrak" was written during the period leading up to the recording of Bog, an album that marked a decisive stylistic shift for Pips, Chips & Videoclips toward slower tempos, extended song structures and a more introspective approach. In later interviews and retrospective coverage, frontman Dubravko Ivaniš described the Bog period as shaped by prolonged studio work and internal tensions within the band, while emphasising that the songs themselves were not conceived as direct autobiographical statements.

Music for the song is credited to Ivaniš and guitarist Tristan Karas (Tićo), with lyrics written by Ivaniš. Retrospective reviews of Bog have frequently identified "Dan, mrak" as one of the album's central compositions and as the track chosen to introduce the record to the public.

== Recording and production ==
According to the band's official album page, Bog was recorded and mixed at Studio Tivoli in Ljubljana between June and October 1999. The recording details published by the band state that the album was entirely "snimljeno i mixano" (recorded and mixed) at the studio, with Denis Mujadžić (Denyken) credited as producer and recording engineer, and Aco Razbornik credited for additional mixing work.

The CD single liner notes for "Dan, mrak", as reproduced on Discogs, also list Studio Tivoli as the recording location and credit Denyken with production, recording and mixing duties, with Zlaja Hadžić credited for drum recording during the sessions.

== Composition and lyrics ==
"Dan, mrak" is structured as an extended album-era track and, at over seven minutes in length, was noted in retrospective coverage as the band's longest single at the time of release.

The song's official lyrics, as published on the band's website, conclude with lines from "Bratec Martin", the Croatian version of the traditional French nursery rhyme "Frère Jacques". In its traditional form, "Frère Jacques" is a round whose lyrics address a friar who has overslept and is urged to wake up and ring the bells for matins ("ding, ding, dong").

Concert reports have noted that this quotation is also used as a closing coda in live performances of "Dan, mrak".

== Release and formats ==
"Dan, mrak" was released in 1999 as a CD single in Croatia, credited to the labels Dan, Mrak and Jabukaton.

Later media coverage noted that the name of the band's independent imprint, Dan, Mrak, was taken directly from the title of the lead single, reflecting a move toward greater organisational autonomy during the Bog era.

=== Live recordings ===
A live version of "Dan, mrak" appears on the DVD 2×2 – Live in ZPC, documenting the band's concert performances from the period following the release of Bog.

== Music video ==
The music video for "Dan, mrak" was directed by Croatian visual artist Mauricio Ferlin, who also designed the CD single artwork.

In a profile of Ferlin's work, Glazba.hr described the video as staged as a puppet-theatre performance and listed it among several videos Ferlin created for the band during the late 1990s.

== Reception ==
In retrospective coverage of Bog, Croatian music press has repeatedly framed the album as a landmark of late-1990s domestic rock, with "Dan, mrak" positioned as the lead single associated with the album's musical direction and the launch of the band's independent label initiative.

== Live performance ==
Concert reports from different periods have described "Dan, mrak" as a recurring feature of the band's setlists, often used as a closing or near-closing song and marked by audience participation during its final section.

== Track listing ==
The following track listing and durations are taken from the band's official discography page, while songwriting credits are based on the CD single liner notes and the HDS ZAMP database.

No.	Title	Music	Length
1.	"Dan, mrak"	Dubravko Ivaniš, Tristan Karas	7:10
2.	"Middle Age Horror Show"	Dubravko Ivaniš, Tristan Karas, Alen Kraljić	3:20
Total length:			10:30

== Personnel ==
Credits are taken from the CD single liner notes.

=== Pips, Chips & Videoclips ===
- Dubravko Ivaniš – vocals, piano, melodica
- Mario Borščak – bass
- Alen Kraljić – guitar
- Tristan Karas – guitar, backing vocals ("Middle Age Horror Show")
- Igor Paradiš – drums

=== Additional personnel ===
- Jadranka Juras – backing vocals ("Dan, mrak")
- Tina Rupčić – backing vocals ("Middle Age Horror Show")
- Vanja Marin – bass ("Dan, mrak")
- Hrvoje Rupčić – percussion
- Denis Mujadžić (Denyken) – production, recording, mixing
- Aco Razbornik – mixing
- Zlaja Hadžić – drums recording
- Mauricio Ferlin – design, music video director
