= Pjesme za gladijatore =

Studio album by Pips, Chips & Videoclips
- Released: 15 October 2007
- Genre: Alternative rock
- Language: Croatian
- Label: Menart Records
- Producers: Ivan Božanić, Pavle Miholjević, Jura Ferina, Dave Fridmann

Pips, Chips & Videoclips chronology
Dokument (2005)	Pjesme za gladijatore (2007)	Walt (2013)

Pjesme za gladijatore (English: Songs for Gladiators) is the sixth studio album by the Croatian alternative rock band Pips, Chips & Videoclips, released in October 2007.

It is the band's sixth studio album and features 12 tracks recorded in 2006 and 2007 in Zagreb. Additional mixing and production was done by Dave Fridmann at the Tarbox Road Studios in Cassadaga, New York.

Croatian rock critic Aleksandar Dragaš described Pjesme za gladijatore as a "rather strained prog-rock album". It received mixed reviews and failed to repeat the success of the band's earlier albums such as Fred Astaire and Bog.

== Track listing ==
1. "Dolazak astronauta"
2. "Gravitacija"
3. "Teroristi plaču"
4. "Zdenka i vanzemaljci"
5. "Sin"
6. "U zvijezdama"
7. "Domaći rock"
8. "Električne gitare pobjeđuju"
9. "Idealna pop pjesma za astronaute"
10. "Foxtrot"
11. "Slan"
12. "Popravak"
