= DeWalt (disambiguation) =

DeWalt is an American tool manufacturer.

DeWalt or Dewalt may also refer to:

== People ==
- Kathleen Musante DeWalt, American academic
- Kevin DeWalt (born 1959), Canadian film and television producer
- Malcolm DeWalt (born 2002), American football player
- Raymond DeWalt (1885–1961), American inventor and entrepreneur, founder of the DeWalt company
- Roy Dewalt (born 1956), American former Canadian Football League quarterback

== Places ==
- DeWalt, Missouri City, Texas, United States, a former unincorporated community

== See also ==
- Walt (disambiguation)
