= Dom Sportova =

Multi-purpose indoor sports arena in Zagreb, Croatia

Coordinates: 45°48′28″N 15°57′7″E

Dom sportova
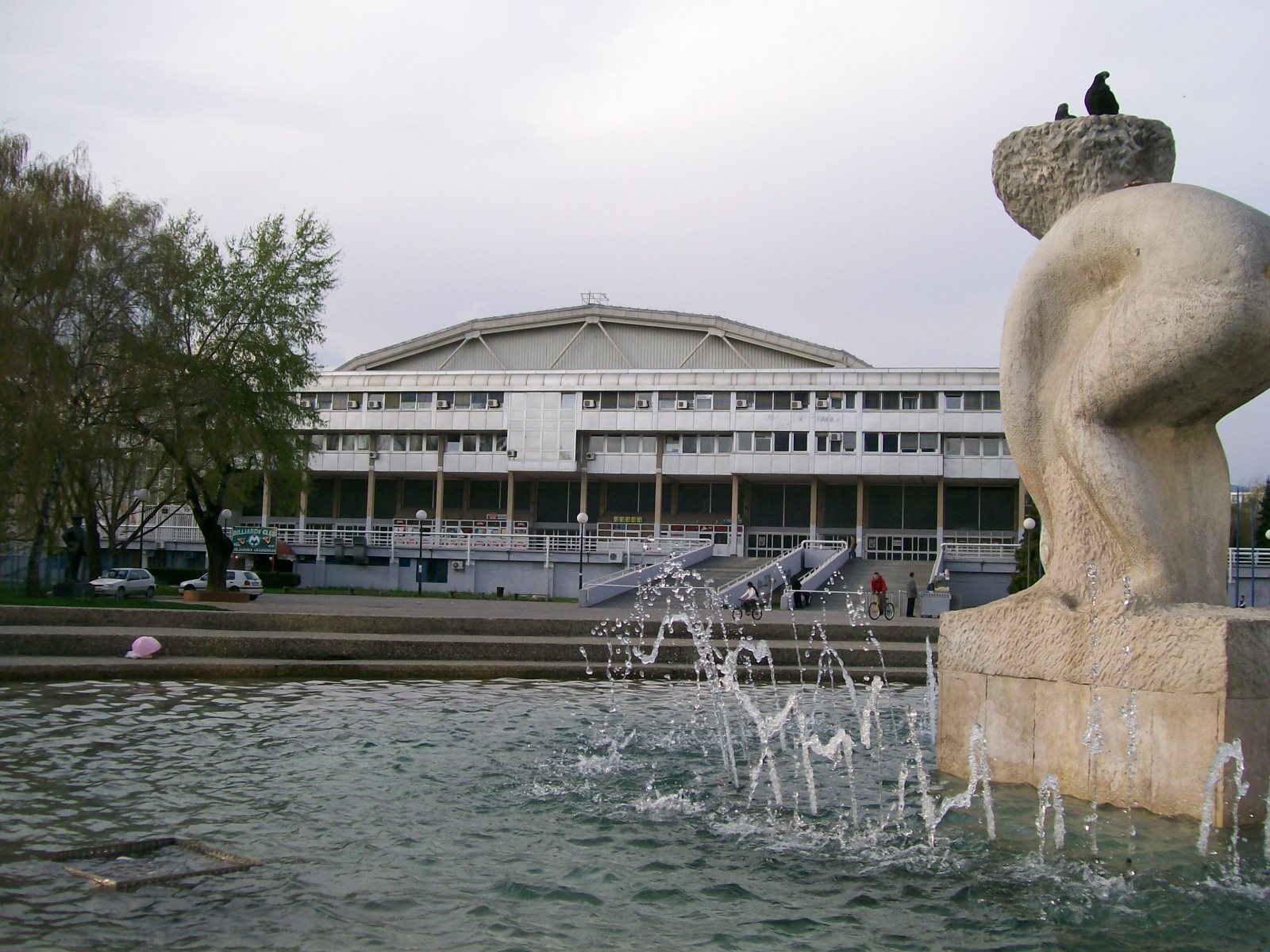
- Dom sportova in 2008
- Interactive map of Dom sportova
- Address: Trg Krešimira Ćosića 11
- Location: Zagreb, Croatia
- Owner: Zagreb City Assembly
- Capacity: Ice-hockey: 5,000; Handball: 3,500; Basketball: 3,100; Concerts: 8,000
- Surface: 32,000 m^{2}

Construction
- Groundbreaking: 1964
- Built: 1972
- Opened: 17 June 1972; 54 years ago
- Renovated: 2024-present
- Architect: Vladimir Turina

Tenants
- KHL Medveščak; RK Zagreb

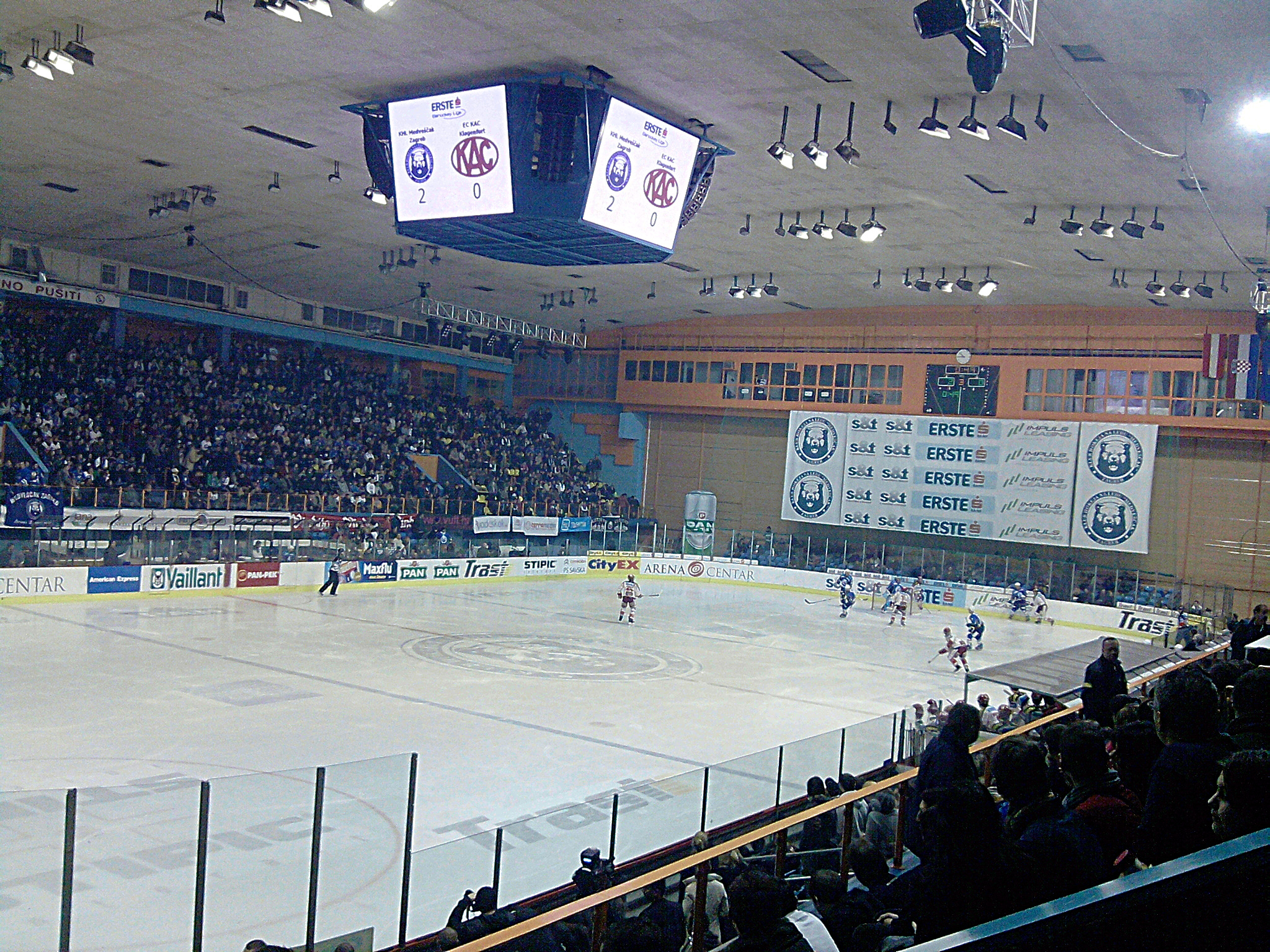
Seating, 2010

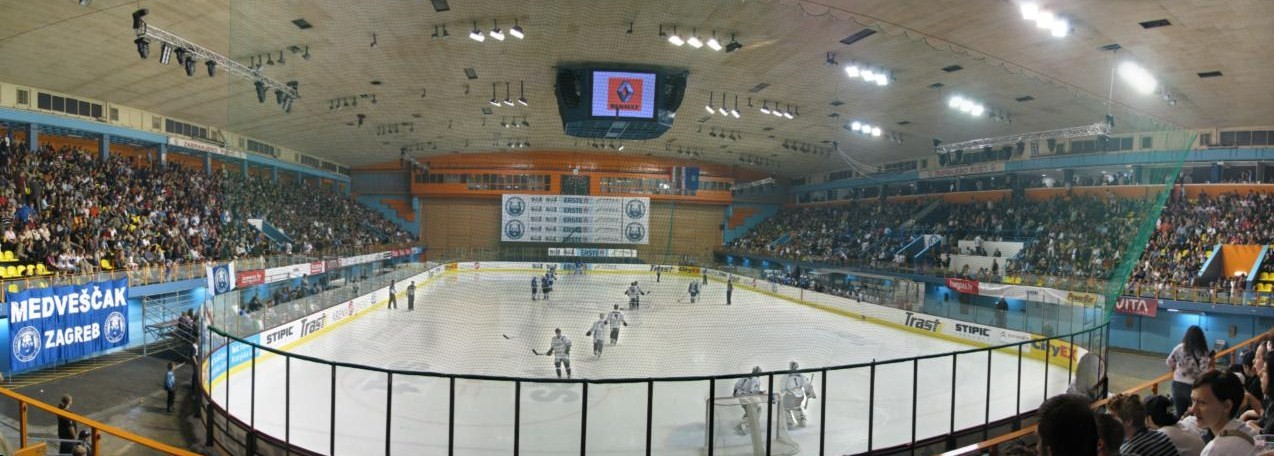
Panoramic view inside the arena

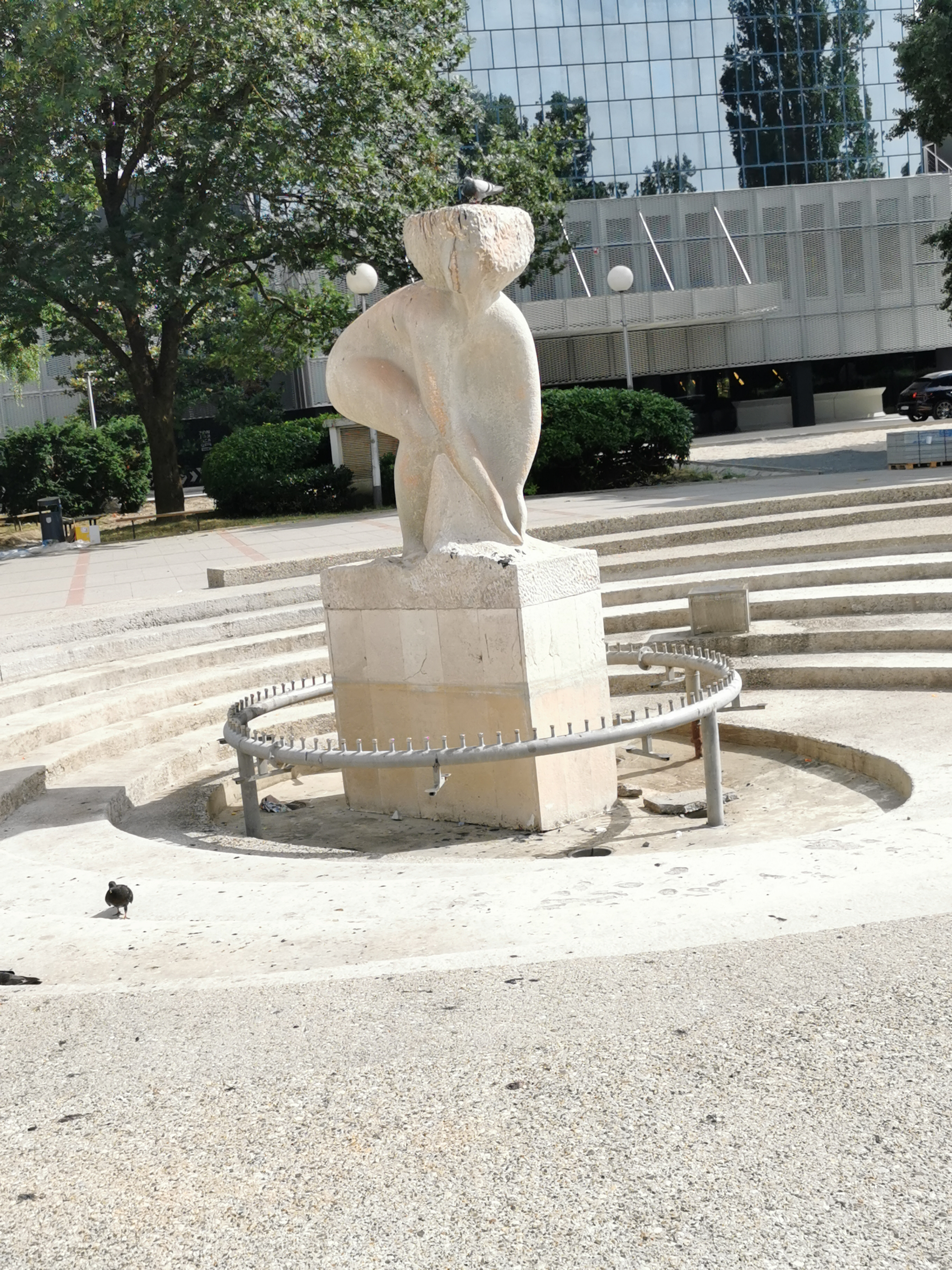
Statue "Bather", in front of the arena

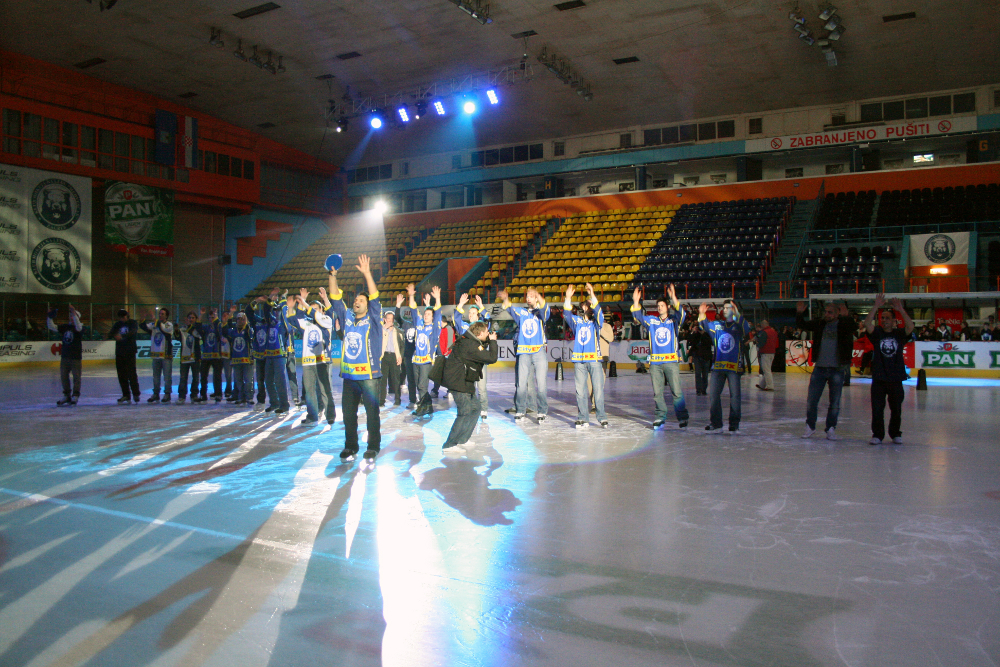
KHL Medveščak

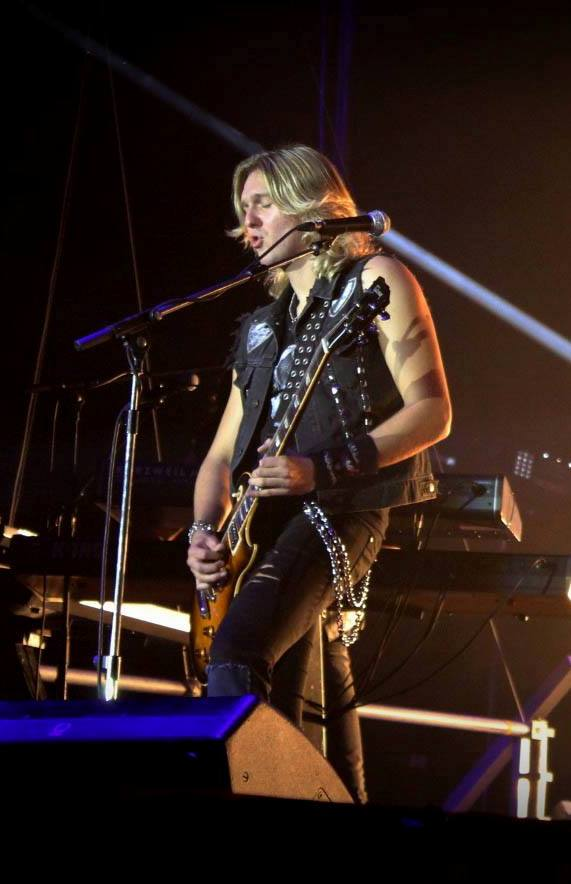
Ivan Ivanković performing, 2013

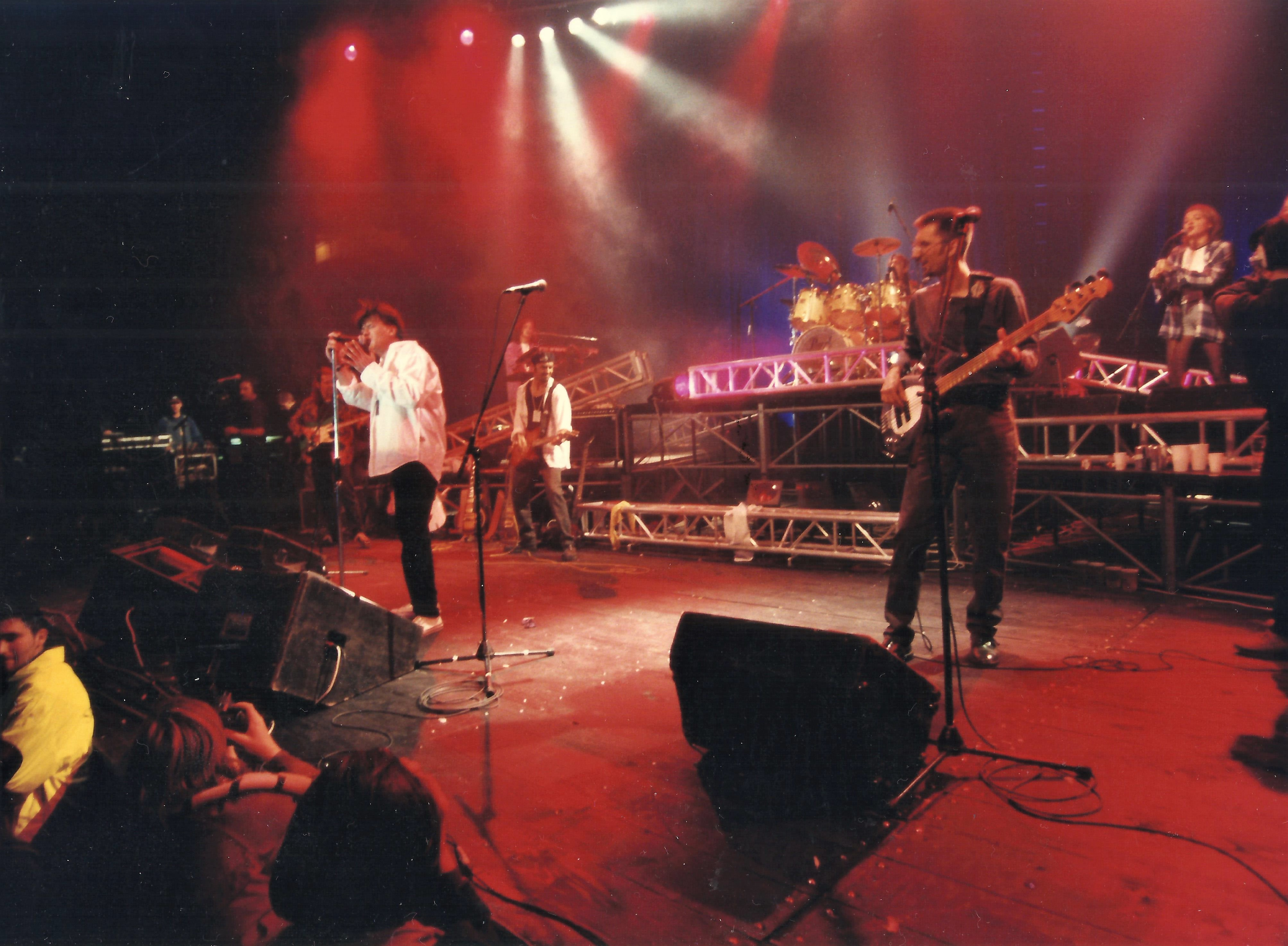
Crvena Jabuka performing, 1996

Dom sportova Zagreb (lit. 'Zagreb House of Sports') or Dom sportova, is a multi-purpose indoor sports arena located in Zagreb, Croatia. The venue was built in 1972 in the Trešnjevka neighborhood, in the western part of the city. It has 32,000 m^{2} of floorspace, and it features six halls. The seating capacity of the biggest two halls is 5,000 and 3,100. It is used for basketball, handball, volleyball, ice hockey, gymnastics, tennis, as well as concerts.

It is the venue for the PBZ Zagreb Indoors men's tennis tournament. It also hosted the final tournament of the 1989 European Basketball Championship, in which the home team of Yugoslavia won the gold medal, the 2000 European Men's Handball Championship, the 2003 World Women's Handball Championship, the 2005 Women's European Volleyball Championship as well as the 2008 and 2013 European Figure Skating Championships.

Dom Sportova was Zagreb's biggest indoor entertainment-complex before Arena Zagreb was built in 2008.

== History ==
Construction began in 1964 according to a design by Vladimir Turina. Youth volunteer labor actions involving young people from Zagreb were also used in the construction. Despite this, progress did not proceed at the desired pace, and completion became an urgent issue. Although it was not finished, the complex was officially opened on 17 June 1972 with a friendly basketball match between Europe and the United States. The European team, led by Krešimir Ćosić, also featured Nikola Plećaš, while they faced a young American team composed of university players. In front of approximately 8,000 spectators, the Europeans won 102–75. Construction continued after the match. The small hall was not opened until 1974.

There was discussion about naming the hall after an individual, with proposed names ranging from Rade Končar to Franjo Bučar. However, no agreement was reached among the proponents, and the name Dom sportova remained.

Dom sportova has hosted numerous sporting events, including European Championships in figure skating, basketball, volleyball, and handball. Historic matches were played there by Cibona basketball players, RK Zagreb handball players, and Medveščak ice hockey players. The venue has also hosted numerous concerts by domestic performers (such as Parni valjak and Prljavo kazalište) as well as world-famous musicians and bands (including the Rolling Stones, Iron Maiden, and Queen).

== Reconstruction ==
Dom sportova, which was built in 1972 and has not undergone systematic renovation since then, required a major renovations. A comprehensive renovation has been awaited for more than ten years, and the 2020 earthquakes further worsened the condition of the structure, making reconstruction even more urgent. According to the City’s plan, the renovation is being carried out in three phases. The first phase, which began in 2024, includes the main hall and Halls 3 and 4, and its completion is expected in the first half of this year. This will be followed by the renovation of Hall 2, while the third phase includes energy renovation and outfitting. Under the original schedule, the second phase is expected to be completed in 2027 and the third in 2028.

The new procurement will include works for the second and third phases, and the construction of a new building envelope is also planned. In this way, in addition to structural and energy renovation, the Sports Hall is expected to gain a completely new exterior appearance and a modernized visual identity, with the aim of further enhancing the building’s functionality and energy efficiency.

In January 2026, City of Zagreb announced temporary suspension of the project due to irregularities in the public procurement procedure.

== Concerts ==
Some of the concerts held there;

Date	Performer	Concert or Tour
19 October 1975	Santana	Dance of the Rainbow Serpent Tour
21 November 1975	Frank Zappa	Zappa '75: Zagreb/Ljubljana
21 September 1976	Paul McCartney and Wings	Wings Over the World tour
21 June 1976	Rolling Stones	The Rolling Stones Tour of Europe '76
22 June 1976	Rolling Stones	The Rolling Stones Tour of Europe '76
6 February 1979	Queen	Jazz Tour
7 May 1979	Tina Turner	Tina Turner Show
16 March 1979	Slade	Return to Base
7 July 1980	B.B. King	Rock Jazz Blues Festival
27 July 1982	Talking Heads	Concert
4 September 1982	Motörhead	Iron First Tour
21 October 1982	Wishbone Ash	Concert
22 October 1982	Tangerine Dream	Logos Live
4 March 1983	UFO	Making Contact Tour
19 March 1983	Saxon	Power & the Glory Tour
29 February 1984	Bo Diddley	Big Bad Bo Tour
19 April 1984	Elton John	European Express Tour
15 January 1985	Rory Gallagher	Concert
17 December 1985	Eddy Grant	Concert
25 March 1986	UFO	Misdemeanor Tour
11 September 1986	Iron Maiden	Somewhere on Tour
2 December 1986	Nazareth & Girlschool	Nightmare at Maple Cross Tour
9 April 1989	Laibach	Macbeth Tour
20 November 1989	The Sugarcubes	Here Today, Tomorrow Next Week!
9 March 1990	The Godfathers	Concert
15 April 1990	The Fall	Extricate Tour
23 October 1990	The Mission	World Deliverance Tour
8 November 1990	The Sisters of Mercy	Tour Thing
2 December 1990	Scorpions	Crazy World Tour
4 February 1991	Iggy Pop	Brick by Brick Tour
6 February 1991	Deep Purple	Slaves and Masters World Tour
26 February 1991	Judas Priest	Painkiller Tour
19 April 1991	The House of Love	The House of Love Tour
14 May 1991	The Pet Shop Boys	Performance Tour
6 June 1991	Einstürzende Neubauten	Concert
6 July 1994	B.B. King	There Is Always One More Time Tour
11 October 1994	Ramones & Hladno Pivo	Concert
23 November 1994	Ice-T	Original Gangster Tour
18 March 1995	The Cramps	Concert
25 January 1996	Mišo Kovač	Concert
4 December 1996	Crvena Jabuka	Concert
1 July 1997	David Bowie	Earthling Tour
27 December 1997	The Kelly Family	Concert
21 February 1998	Jimmy Page & Robert Plant	Page/Plant - Europe Spring Tour
19 October 1998	Santana	Concert
28 October 1998	Slayer	Diabolus in Musica Tour
12 November 1998	Transglobal Underground	Concert
22 October 1999	Blondie & Jinx	No Exit Tour
30 October 2000	Bryan Adams	The Best of Me Tour
16 December 2000	Crvena Jabuka	Concert
16 December 2000	Duran Duran & Flare	Pop Trash Tour
29 April 2000	Eros Ramazzotti	Concert
30 October 2000	David Copperfield	Journey of a Lifetime Tour
28 January 2001	Doris Dragović	Rođendan u Zagrebu
3 November 2001	Depeche Mode	Exciter Tour
13 December 2001	Severina	Virujen u te
12 June 2002	Enrique Iglesias	One Night Stand Tour
28 October 2002	Goran Bregović	Concert
12 February 2003	Gibonni	Mirakul
1 September 2003	Placebo	Concert
27 December 2003	Đorđe Balašević	Concert
6 February 2004	Oliver Dragojević	Concert
7 February 2004	Oliver Dragojević	Concert
20 July 2004	Santana	European Tour
19 January 2005	R.E.M.	European Winter Tour
14 February 2005	Nina Badrić	Ljubav za ljubav concert
27 May 2005	Faithless, Thievery Corporation, Gus Gus and X-Press 2	Zagreb Groove Festival
6 October 2005	The Prodigy	Their Law: The Singles 1990–2005 Tour
14 October 2005	Novi fosili	Za dobra stara vremena
27 October 2005	Phil Collins	First Final Farewell Tour
21 February 2006	Dražen Zečić, Baruni, Mate Bulić, Marko Perković Thompson, Miroslav Škoro	Humanitarni koncert "Zajedno"
22 March 2007	Depeche Mode	Touring the Angel
26 September 2006	Pearl Jam	Concert
31 May 2007	Gipsy Kings	Concert
9 October 2007	Muse	Concert
29 November 2007	Jinx	Green Tour
3 December 2007	50 Cent	European Tour
14 December 2007	Hladno Pivo	Knjiga Žalbe Concert
19 December 2007	Bijelo Dugme	Concert
10 October 2008	Alicia Keys	As I Am Tour
6 November 2009	Massive Attack	Concert
27 February 2010	Spandau Ballet	Concert
4 April 2010	Manu Chao	Concert
5 June 2010	Deep Purple	Rapture of the Deep tour
6 November 2010	Tomislav Bralić & Klapa Intrade	Concert
20 December 2010	Zvijezde Hit Recordsa	Concert
12 November 2011	TBF	Pistachio Metallic Concert
16 February 2012	Chris Rea	Concert
3 June 2012	Zaz	Live Tour '12
8 November 2012	Brit Floyd	Tribute concert
2 December 2012	Dubioza Kolektiv	Pozitivan Koncert
11 December 2012	Gazde	Tribute concert
11 December 2012	Zvijezde Hit Recordsa	Concert
23 March 2013	Parni Valjak	"Bez Struje" concert
3 April 2013	Gregorian	The World Epic Chants Tour
15 June 2013	Whitesnake	Year of the Snake Tour
26 October 2013	Dubioza Kolektiv	Concert
16 November 2013	Marko Perković Thompson	Ora et Labora Tour
14 February 2014	Massimo Savić	Valentine's Day Concert
4 March 2014	Simple Minds	Greatest Hits Tour - 2014
11 April 2014	Psihomodo Pop	Concert
16 June 2014	Dropkick Murphys	Concert
28 November 2014	TBF, Dubioza Kolektiv, Jinx, Elemental, Brkovi	"10. Pozitivan Koncert"
27 November 2015	Pips, Chips & Videoclips, Damir Urban, S.A.R.S., Dječaci	"11. Pozitivan Koncert"
11 February 2017	Let 3 & Psihomodo Pop	Concert
7 April 2017	Parov Stelar	Concert
2 March 2017	Hladno Pivo	"30. Godina" Concert
4 May 2017	Jinx	Concert
30 November 2018	Editors	Concert
12 October 2019	The Chemical Brothers	Concert
23 November 2019	Dubioza Kolektiv	Concert
13 October 2022	Hladno Pivo	Concert
7 October 2023	KUKU$	Concert
11 November 2023	Vojko V	Concert

== See also ==
- List of tennis stadiums by capacity
- List of indoor arenas in Croatia
- List of indoor arenas in Europe

Preceded by Peace and Friendship Stadium; Athens	FIBA EuroBasket; Final Venue; 1989	Succeeded by PalaEur; Rome
Preceded by PalaOnda; Bolzano	European Men's Handball Championship; Final Venue; 2000	Succeeded by Ericsson Globe; Stockholm
