= Walt (disambiguation) =

Walt is a masculine given name and a surname.

Walt may also refer to:

- The Walt, a Dutch post-punk/indie rock band
- Walt (album), a 2013 studio album by the Croatian alternative rock band Pips, Chips & Videoclips
- Walt: The Man Behind the Myth, a biographical documentary about Walt Disney
- WALT (disambiguation), various American radio stations
- Walt (military slang), a British military term for an impostor
