= Dinamo ja volim =

Song by Croatian rock band Pips, Chips & Videoclips

Single by Pips, Chips & Videoclips

from the album Shimpoo Pimpoo
- B-side: "Krumpira!"
- Released: 1993
- Recorded: 1992
- Studio: Best Music Studio (Zagreb)
- Genre: Rock
- Length: 4:34
- Label: STV Music
- Songwriter: Dubravko Ivaniš
- Composer: Dubravko Ivaniš
- Producer: Denis Mujadžić (Denyken)

"Dinamo ja volim" is a song by Croatian rock band Pips, Chips & Videoclips, written and composed by frontman Dubravko Ivaniš in 1992 and first released in 1993 as the band's debut single, with "Krumpira!" as its B-side. Both songs were later included on the group's debut studio album Shimpoo Pimpoo. Its release marked a decisive breakthrough for the band, rapidly expanding their visibility beyond the alternative scene and positioning them among the most prominent Croatian rock acts of the period.

Over time, the song became closely associated with GNK Dinamo Zagreb and its organised supporter culture, and was widely described in Croatian media as an (unofficial) supporters' anthem. It subsequently acquired a broader symbolic role beyond football and has since attained cult status within Croatian popular culture.

At the same time, band members have retrospectively described the song's enduring prominence as a double-edged legacy: while it defined an entire phase of the group's early success, it also attached lasting expectations and interpretative weight to a single track whose meanings and uses evolved independently of the band's original intentions.

== Background and writing ==
According to producer Denis Mujadžić (Denyken), the song originated from an abandoned early concept. Ivaniš initially proposed adapting the disco track "That's the Way (I Like It)" by KC and the Sunshine Band as a musical foundation. Guitarist Alen Kraljić rejected the idea, reportedly arguing that such a reference would not resonate with a punk- and rock-oriented audience. Kraljić then introduced Ivaniš to the football anthem "You'll Never Walk Alone", suggesting it as a stylistic reference rather than a template for direct imitation.

Denyken stated that Ivaniš returned the following day with a fully written song, which became "Dinamo ja volim". He later emphasised that similarities with "You'll Never Walk Alone" should be understood as influence rather than plagiarism, noting that the song has never been subject to legal disputes regarding authorship.

Ivaniš has recalled writing the song in a Zagreb apartment, noting that early rehearsals were loud enough to provoke complaints from neighbours. In later interviews, he stressed that the song was not conceived as a formal club anthem, but rather as a personal expression of attachment to Dinamo understood as a broader civic and cultural idea.

== Recording and production ==
The song was recorded in 1992 in Zagreb, with Denis Mujadžić credited as producer. Alen Kraljić arranged the composition and performed the guitar parts.

Denyken recalled that early recording sessions involved improvisation due to limited equipment, including the use of a tamburica (bisernica) in place of a standard electric guitar during initial demos.

In interviews and television documentaries on Croatian rock music, Kraljić described assembling a small group of local supporters to record the chant-like backing vocals. Members of the Bad Blue Boys from the neighbourhood participated in the session, forming the supporters' choir heard in the released version. Contemporary accounts note that individuals connected to different strands of Zagreb's supporter scene took part, contributing to the song's collective character.

== Composition and lyrics ==
Lyrically, "Dinamo ja volim" centres on loyalty and identification rather than sporting success or rivalry. Ivaniš has repeatedly stated that the song reflects his relationship with the idea of Dinamo as a civic and cultural symbol, rather than a conventional football chant tied to match results.

In interviews, Ivaniš has emphasised that the lyrics deliberately avoid explicit political messages or aggressive supporter rhetoric, focusing instead on a simple and inclusive expression of belonging. He has also noted that some lyrical elements which seemed acceptable in the early 1990s might be approached differently today, reflecting shifts in social and cultural sensibilities over time.

Contemporary biographical material published by the band's record label situates the song within the tradition of football supporter anthems, particularly referencing "You'll Never Walk Alone" as an important cultural point of orientation. The same material describes the song's early reception as immediate and widespread, while noting that its prominence in the early 1990s also placed a certain interpretative and public burden on the band.

== Release and formats ==
"Dinamo ja volim" was first issued as a cassette single in 1993 by STV Music, with the track "Krumpira!" on the B-side. Music journalist Aleksandar Dragaš later noted that the cassette was printed in a limited run of approximately 5,000 copies.

The song was subsequently included on the band's debut studio album Shimpoo Pimpoo. An unplugged version also appears on the CD edition of the album, representing the only officially released alternative arrangement of the song. According to the album's liner notes, this version was recorded for the television programme Music Pub, hosted by Zlatko Turkalj.

According to information published on the band's official web shop, the group did not receive a conventional financial fee for the cassette release. Instead, they were paid with several thousand copies of the cassette and were given full freedom to distribute or use them as they wished. Decades later, remaining copies of the original cassette have been made available for purchase through the band's official merchandise store, presenting the release as a preserved artefact from the band's early history.

=== Compilation appearances ===
Following its original release, "Dinamo ja volim" later appeared on various compilation albums documenting Croatian rock and alternative music. These releases indicate the song's continued circulation beyond its initial cassette and album context and place it within retrospective overviews of the band's catalogue and the Croatian rock scene of the period.

== Music video ==
A music video for "Dinamo ja volim" was produced and broadcast on Croatian music television in the early 1990s. While the video contributed to the song's visibility at the time, specific directorial credits have not been consistently documented in secondary sources.

== Reception and cultural legacy ==
=== Supporter culture ===
From the 1990s onward, "Dinamo ja volim" became embedded in the supporter culture surrounding GNK Dinamo Zagreb. Croatian newspapers have repeatedly described the song as an (unofficial) anthem associated with the club and its supporters, particularly the Bad Blue Boys.

Former Croatia national team player and coach Slaven Bilić described "Dinamo ja volim" as "probably the best supporters' song in Croatia", highlighting its emotional resonance and longevity within football culture.

Academic research on football supporter culture in Croatia identifies chants and songs as key practices through which collective identity and solidarity are constructed. Within this framework, "Dinamo ja volim" is frequently cited in media discourse as an example of a song whose meaning extends beyond music into ritualised supporter practice.

Beyond stadium use, the song's circulation in cassette form contributed to its broader social presence. As the band later noted, thousands of copies of the original cassette were distributed informally rather than through conventional commercial channels, allowing the recording to function as a portable artefact that moved between concerts, private gatherings and public events. In retrospect, this mode of circulation has been interpreted as part of the song's lasting symbolic weight within Zagreb's urban and supporter culture.

=== Political and social reception ===
In later interviews, Ivaniš addressed the song's use beyond football supporter settings, particularly during the mid-1990s. He recalled that former police official Vladimir Faber publicly played a cassette of "Dinamo ja volim" during a large protest in support of Radio 101, where the song was broadcast to an estimated crowd of around 120,000 people. According to Ivaniš, this marked a moment in which the song moved beyond its original context and was adopted as a broader symbol within public demonstrations.

Ivaniš has since expressed a critical view of how the song was later interpreted and used in public discourse. He argued that its symbolic role was shaped by media and political dynamics of the period and suggested that the song's presence at such events did not translate into lasting civic outcomes. This retrospective assessment has informed his later reluctance to isolate the song as a standalone political statement, instead framing it as part of a broader body of work whose meaning evolved independently of the band's original intentions.

=== Live performance history ===
Although frequently performed during the band's early years, "Dinamo ja volim" was absent from Pips, Chips & Videoclips' live setlists for extended periods. Ivaniš later explained that the band avoided performing the song to prevent concerts from becoming audience-request "jukebox" events, stating that all of the band's songs could be understood as "Dinamo songs" in a broader sense.

The song returned to the band's live repertoire during a major outdoor concert at Šalata in the early 2020s, where its performance was widely noted by critics and audiences.

=== International reception ===
In 2014, German football supporters adopted an instrumental adaptation of "Dinamo ja volim", a development reported in Croatian sports media as an example of the song's cross-border resonance within European supporter culture.

== Track listing ==
The following track listing and songwriting credits are based on entries in the Croatian Composers' Society (HDS ZAMP) database.

No.	Title	Music	Length
1.	"Dinamo ja volim"	Dubravko Ivaniš	4:34
2.	"Krumpira!"	Dubravko Ivaniš, Alen Kraljić, Denis Mujadžić	6:42
Total length:			11:16

== Personnel ==
Personnel and production credits are taken from the cassette liner notes of the original 1993 STV Music release.

- Dubravko Ivaniš – vocals; music and lyrics
- Alen Kraljić – arrangement; guitar
- Denis Mujadžić (Denyken) – production
- Bad Blue Boys – supporters' choir
- Dejan Krišić – design
- Aleksandar Dragaš – music editor
- Bojan Mušćet – executive producer
- Marinko Božić – label director
