= Narko (song) =

Song by Croatian rock band Pips, Chips & Videoclips

Single by Pips, Chips & Videoclips

from the album Bog
- Released: 2000
- Recorded: June–October 1999
- Studio: Studio Tivoli (Ljubljana)
- Genre: Alternative rock
- Label: Dan, Mrak
- Songwriter: Dubravko Ivaniš (lyrics)
- Composers: Mario Borščak, Dubravko Ivaniš, Tristan Karas
- Producer: Denis Mujadžić (Denyken)

"Narko" is a song by Croatian rock band Pips, Chips & Videoclips. The song emerged during the sessions for the band's fourth studio album, Bog (1999), and was later issued as a CD single in several different versions.

In retrospective interviews, frontman Dubravko Ivaniš described the recording and release decisions surrounding "Narko", particularly the choice of version used for its music video, as a flashpoint that contributed to the dissolution of the band’s then-lineup.

== Background and context ==
Ivaniš has stated that "Narko" originated from a bass motif by Mario Borščak and that the band rehearsed the song for months. He characterised the process as the most contested songwriting episode in the group’s history, noting that disagreements surrounding the song exposed deeper divergences within the band.

Beyond its immediate creation, the song is closely tied to the wider context of the album Bog, a period Ivaniš later described as marked by prolonged studio work and growing internal tensions. In a separate interview, he referred to "Narko" as having a specific "target", while emphasising that its subsequent reception and interpretation exceeded his original intentions.

The album Bog has been widely discussed in Croatian music press as a landmark domestic rock release of the late 1990s, particularly in later retrospective coverage and reissue announcements.

== Recording and production ==
"Narko" was recorded and mixed at Studio Tivoli in Ljubljana between June and October 1999, with Denis Mujadžić (Denyken) handling production, recording and mixing. Zlaja Hadžić recorded the drums, while Aco Razbornik is credited for additional mixing.

Ivaniš recalled that musician Srđan Sacher, formerly a member of Haustor and the band Vještice, was invited to contribute sitar parts during the sessions. According to Ivaniš, Sacher remained in Ljubljana for several days to acclimatise to the instrument before recording, and the sitar parts were subsequently edited to fit the song’s harmonic framework.

== Composition and lyrics ==
The song unfolds gradually, prioritising atmosphere and restraint over conventional verse–chorus dynamics. Its extended duration allows space for gradual development and an understated vocal delivery.

Lyrically, "Narko" employs fragmentary imagery and repeated rhetorical questions, juxtaposing everyday scenes with confrontational or transgressive motifs. The recurring refrain "ti si moj narko" ("you are my narcotic") has been interpreted by critics as framing the central relationship in terms of emotional dependency and instability. Ivaniš has consistently resisted definitive authorial interpretations of the song, describing his songwriting as intentionally open-ended.

== Release and versions ==
"Narko" was released in Croatia as a CD single on the band’s Dan, Mrak imprint (catalogue number DM CD 2006). The single brings together three takes on the song: the album version, an earlier "first version", and a remix. On the band’s official discography, the remix is listed as "Narko (amsterdamdub)", while some release databases give the full title as "Narko (Amsterdamdubjazztripthing)".

An unplugged version of the song was later released on Dokument (izštekani session), recorded for the radio programme Izštekani on Val 202 (Radio Slovenia).

A live version was released on the DVD 2x2 (Live in ZPC), where Ivaniš performs "Narko" together with his wife, the singer Yaya.

== Music video ==
A music video for "Narko" was produced during the promotional cycle for Bog and has remained in circulation through the band’s official channels. In a profile of his videography, Glazba.hr lists visual artist Mauricio Ferlin among the creators who produced a series of videos for the band, including "Narko".

== Reception ==
In retrospective coverage, Croatian music media have frequently cited "Narko" as one of the defining tracks from Bog. Reviews and reassessments published by outlets such as Ravno do dna and Glazba.hr have discussed the song in the context of the album’s darker, more introspective aesthetic and the band’s late-1990s transition.

Retrospective reviews of Bog have further described the album as a pivotal release in Croatian rock, noting its role in positioning Pips, Chips & Videoclips at the forefront of the Zagreb scene and highlighting its move toward more serious and introspective themes. Critics have identified tracks such as "Narko" as part of the album’s core repertoire that exemplifies this artistic shift and its enduring critical standing.

== Live performances ==
"Narko" has remained a regular part of the band’s concert repertoire. Concert reviews and setlist documentation consistently place the song among the group’s most frequently performed numbers, often noting its reception by audiences.

== Track listing ==
Track titles, durations and songwriting credits are taken from the CD single liner notes and the HDS ZAMP database.

No.	Title	Music	Length
1.	"Narko (album version)"	Mario Borščak, Dubravko Ivaniš, Tristan Karas	7:03
2.	"Narko (first version)"	Mario Borščak, Dubravko Ivaniš, Tristan Karas	7:35
3.	"Narko (Amsterdamdubjazztripthing)" (remix)	Robert Moorman	5:04
Total length:			19:42

== Personnel ==
Credits are taken from the CD single liner notes as reproduced by Discogs.

=== Pips, Chips & Videoclips ===
- Dubravko Ivaniš – vocals, piano, melodica
- Tristan Karas – guitar, backing vocals
- Alen Kraljić – guitar
- Mario Borščak – bass
- Igor Paradiš – drums

=== Additional musicians ===
Album version

- Anja Tomažin – backing vocals
- Jadranka Juras – backing vocals
- Srđan Sacher – sitar
- Hrvoje Rupčić – percussion

First version

- Jadranka Krištof – backing vocals
- Tina Rupčić – backing vocals
- Sašo Fajon – sampler
- Hrvoje Rupčić – percussion
- Davor Klarić – Hammond organ

=== Production and design ===
- Denis Mujadžić (Denyken) – producer, recording, mixing
- Zlaja Hadžić – drum recording
- Aco Razbornik – additional mixing
- Robert Moorman – remix
- Mauricio Ferlin – design
