= Omladinski radio =

Omladinski radio (lit. "Youth radio") may refer to:

- Omladinski radio (Zagreb), the 1984–1990 name of Radio 101, a Croatian radio station
- Omladinski Radio X, 1996–2016 name of Radio gradska mreža - Mostarski radio, a radio station in Bosnia and Herzegovina
