= Drveće i rijeke =

Studio album by Pips, Chips & Videoclips
- Released: 11 April 2003
- Genre: Alternative rock
- Language: Croatian
- Label: Menart Records
- Producers: Jura Ferina, Pavle Miholjević, Dave Fridmann

Pips, Chips & Videoclips chronology
Bog (1999)	Drveće i rijeke (2003)	Dokument (2005)

Drveće i rijeke (English: Trees and Rivers) is the fifth studio album by the Croatian alternative rock band Pips, Chips & Videoclips, released in April 2003. Additional mixing and production was done by Dave Fridmann at the Tarbox Road Studios in Cassadaga, New York.

The album received mixed reviews and failed to repeat the success of the band's earlier albums such as Fred Astaire and Bog. Still, Croatian rock critic Aleksandar Dragaš compared it favorably with some of the band's latter works, and described it as "Ripper's perceptive, intriguing and intimate album".

== Track listing ==
1. "Dobro" – 4:50
2. "Susjedi" – 4:45
3. "Sebastian" – 5:22
4. "Baka Lucija" – 4:05
5. "Ne igraj se Isusa" – 4:53
6. "Vjetar" – 4:22
7. "Lula s dedom" – 2:13
8. "Mrgud, gorostas i tat" – 4:23
9. "Kako funkcioniraju stvari" – 3:17
10. "Mak"– 4:45
11. "Glavom pod vodom" – 3:17
12. "Bajka" – 4:54
13. "Porculan" – 3:25
14. "2x2" – 6:01
15. "Spava" – 2:50
