= Vesna (album) =

Studio album by Pips, Chips & Videoclips
- Released: 17 October 2023
- Recorded: 2022–2023
- Studios: Dan, Mrak Studio, Zagreb
- Genres: Alternative rock, art rock, electronic rock
- Length: 34:52
- Language: Croatian
- Label: LAA
- Producers: Ivan Božanić, Marko Levanić

Pips, Chips & Videoclips chronology
Walt (2013)	Vesna (2023)

Singles from Vesna
- 1. "Pariz" Released: 2023; 2. "Većinom" Released: 2023; 3. "SSND" Released: 2024

Vesna is the eighth studio album by Croatian alternative rock band Pips, Chips & Videoclips, released on 17 October 2023 by the independent label LAA. It marked the band’s return to the studio album format ten years after Walt (2013).

Consisting of eight tracks and running under 35 minutes, Vesna is the shortest studio album in the band’s discography. Recorded between 2022 and 2023 at Dan, Mrak Studio in Zagreb, the album was produced by Ivan Božanić and Marko Levanić, with all music written by frontman Dubravko Ivaniš.

Upon release, Vesna received widespread critical acclaim and was frequently cited among the strongest Croatian rock albums of 2023. It earned nominations for major domestic music awards, including the Porin and RockOff awards.

== Background and recording ==
Following the release of Walt, frontman Dubravko Ivaniš publicly expressed scepticism toward the album format, suggesting that the band might continue by releasing only standalone singles. Over the subsequent decade, Pips, Chips & Videoclips issued a number of individual tracks and archival releases, while a new studio album remained absent.

Work on Vesna took place primarily during 2022 and 2023 at Dan, Mrak Studio in Zagreb, under the production of guitarist Ivan Božanić and bassist Marko Levanić. All music on the album was written by Ivaniš, with the core band contributing collectively to arrangements and overall sonic direction.

With a running time of just under 35 minutes and eight tracks in total, Vesna is the shortest studio album in the band’s discography. Several reviewers interpreted this concision as a deliberate artistic decision, particularly in the context of the band’s decade-long absence from the album format and changing contemporary listening habits.

== Composition and themes ==
Vesna is characterised by dense synthesizer layers, electronically processed vocals and rhythmically insistent arrangements, balanced against moments of restrained guitar work. Compared to Walt, the album places greater emphasis on texture and atmosphere while retaining a focus on song-based structures.

In contrast to much of the band’s earlier work, Vesna features a more pronounced use of electronically processed vocals, including autotune and contemporary vocal effects. These elements are integrated into the arrangements as structural components rather than decorative additions, aligning the album’s sound with modern production aesthetics while maintaining song-based frameworks.

Lyrically, the album juxtaposes intimate emotional states with broader reflections on social conformity, anxiety and personal dislocation. Songs such as “Netko” and the title track address vulnerability, ageing and parenthood, while more rhythmically driven pieces such as “SSND” engage with themes of alienation and resistance to socially sanctioned behavioural patterns.

In interviews, Ivaniš consistently declined to offer a definitive interpretation of the album’s title or the figure of “Vesna”, presenting it instead as an open symbol connecting the record’s personal and societal motifs.

== Release and promotion ==
Vesna was released on 17 October 2023 on compact disc and digital platforms. The album’s promotion was primarily structured around a series of multi-night concert residencies in Zagreb, which were widely covered as the band’s principal live presentation of the new material. In November 2023, Pips, Chips & Videoclips performed a sequence of sold-out concerts at the Sax! club, framing the album within an extended live format rather than a single launch event.

The promotional cycle continued throughout 2024 with additional high-profile appearances, including festival performances. Among these, the band’s appearance at Zagreb Beer Fest was widely reported and positioned as part of the album’s broader promotional period, bringing Vesna material to a large open-air audience.

== Singles and music videos ==
“Pariz” was released as the lead single in May 2023, marking the band’s formal announcement of a forthcoming studio album after a ten-year gap. Media coverage presented the song as a love-themed composition that simultaneously introduced the album’s broader atmosphere of unease and reflection.

The second single, “Većinom”, was released later in 2023 and subsequently positioned as the album’s opening track. The song received significant critical attention and was frequently cited as one of the album’s central compositions. Its music video features a multigenerational cast, including members of Ivaniš’s family, reinforcing themes of intimacy and everyday experience present throughout the album.

In March 2024, “SSND” was issued as the third single. The title functions as an acronym for the phrase “Svi su na drogama”. The accompanying music video incorporates footage from the Croatian survival video game Scum, an uncommon crossover between domestic rock music and video game culture that attracted additional media attention.

== Critical reception ==
Vesna was met with uniformly positive reviews across the Croatian music press. Critics frequently emphasised the album’s stylistic renewal, concise structure and thematic coherence, often interpreting it as a successful redefinition of the band’s sound rather than a nostalgic return to earlier phases.

While individual reviews differed in their emphasis on electronic experimentation versus rock continuity, there was broad consensus that Vesna represents a confident late-career reinvention that avoids both nostalgia and stylistic stagnation.

Writing for Večernji list, music critic Aleksandar Dragaš described the album as an accomplished work confronting “lies and mimicry of the contemporary world”, highlighting its lyrical focus and production clarity.

Zoran Stajčić of Ravno do dna framed Vesna as an album that functions “only through change”, situating it within the band’s long-term artistic evolution and emphasising its refusal to replicate established formulas.

== Accolades ==
Vesna and its release cycle received multiple nominations at major Croatian music awards. In addition to album-specific recognition, Pips, Chips & Videoclips were nominated in several artist, live-performance and audience-voted categories at the RockOff awards, reflecting both critical and public reception during the album’s promotional period.

Year	Award	Category	Nominee	Result
2024	Porin	Best Rock Album	Vesna – Pips, Chips & Videoclips	Nominated
2024	RockOff	Album of the Year	Vesna – Pips, Chips & Videoclips	Nominated
2024	RockOff	Song of the Year	“Većinom” – Pips, Chips & Videoclips	Nominated
2024	RockOff	Concert Performer of the Year	Pips, Chips & Videoclips	Nominated
2024	RockOff	Rock&Off Performer of the Year	Pips, Chips & Videoclips	Nominated
2024	RockOff	Iskon Award – Audience Award	Pips, Chips & Videoclips	Nominated

== Track listing ==
All lyrics were written by Dubravko Ivaniš. Track listing and music credits are adapted from the album’s CD liner notes.

No.	Title	Music	Length
1.	"Većinom"	Dubravko Ivaniš, Marko Levanić, Ivan Božanić	4:55
2.	"Glas za bluz"	Dubravko Ivaniš	4:30
3.	"Klijenti"	Dubravko Ivaniš	4:05
4.	"Copperfield & Coppertone"	Dubravko Ivaniš	3:30
5.	"Netko"	Dubravko Ivaniš	4:46
6.	"Pariz"	Dubravko Ivaniš	4:10
7.	"SSND"	Dubravko Ivaniš	4:10
8.	"Vesna"	Dubravko Ivaniš	4:44
Total length:			34:52

== Personnel ==
Credits adapted from the album’s liner notes and press materials.

Pips, Chips & Videoclips

- Dubravko Ivaniš – vocals, keyboards
- Ivan Božanić – guitar, keyboards, production
- Marko Levanić – bass, keyboards, production
- Krunoslav Tomašinec – guitar
- Zdeslav Klarić – piano
- Pavle Gulić – drums

Additional musicians

- Ivana Starčević – backing vocals
- Jadranka Ivaniš – backing vocals
- Lucija Ivaniš – backing vocals

Technical

- Pavao Miholjević – mixing, mastering
- Jurica Ferina – mixing, mastering
- Nikolina Ivezić – artwork
