= Heroína =

Heroína may refer to:

- Heroina isonycterina, a fish genus in the family Cichlidae
- Heroína (1972 film), an Argentine film
- Heroína (2005 film), a Spanish film
- Heroina (band), a Yugoslav rock band
- Heroina (magazine), a Yugoslav and Croatian music magazine
- Heroína (Nina Rodríguez album), by Nina Rodríguez, 2017
- Heroina (Sevdaliza album), a 2025 album by Sevdaliza
- Heroína (ship), a privately owned frigate that was operated as a privateer under a license issued by the United Provinces of the River Plate (later Argentina) around 1820
- ARA Heroína, modern Argentine Navy destroyer
- the Spanish and Portuguese word for both heroine and heroin

== Or see ==
- heroine
- heroin
