= WALT =

WALT may refer to:

- WALT-FM, a radio station (102.1 FM) licensed to Meridian, Mississippi, United States
- WALT (Davidson College), a carrier current station (1610 AM) in Davidson, North Carolina, United States
- WMOG (AM), a radio station (910 AM) licensed to Meridian, Mississippi, which held the call sign WALT from 1982 to 2020
- Wizzy Active Lifestyle Telephone, a computer "phone companion" created by Apple
- WOKK, a radio station (97.1 FM) licensed to Meridian, Mississippi, United States, which used the call sign WALT from 1970 to 1983
- WTIS, a radio station (1110 AM) licensed to Tampa, Florida, United States, which used the call sign WALT until 1970
- Walt (album)
- Walt - a UK military term referencing Walter Mitty, for someone pretending to be serving in the armed forces
- World association for photobiomodulation therapy
