= The Walt =

Dutch music group

- Origin: Utrecht, Netherlands
- Genres: post punk
- Years active: 2004–present
- Label: Beep! Beep! Back Up the Truck
- Members: Johan Nijhoff; Sacha van den Haak; Wouter Kors; Boudewijn Rosenmuller
- Website: www.thewalt.nl

The Walt is a four-piece post-punk/indie rock band from Utrecht, Netherlands consisting of musicians known from We vs. Death, Kismet and the retired metalcore group Dawn of Awakening. According to their official website the Walt's influences include bands such as At the Drive-In, Medications, Q and not U, 31Knots and Hot Snakes.

Since 2004 the band has released an annual online promo. In 2008 The Walt was signed by indie-label Beep! Beep! Back Up the Truck and released their debut EP titled 'Something we did not have'. A full-length album is scheduled for 2009.

== Members ==
- Johan Nijhoff—vocals and bassguitar
- Sacha van den Haak—guitar and backing vocals
- Wouter Kors—guitar
- Boudewijn Rosenmuller—drums

== Discography ==
=== Promo's ===
- 3-song e.p. (2005, DIY - CD)
1. disco
2. Hit Me
3. little sister

Recorded at Newground Studio, 2005.
Released under a Creative Commons License; Attribution-NonCommercial-Share Alike 2.5.

- 4-song e.p. (2006, DIY - CD)
1. sir we'll meet again
2. little sister
3. only smoke
4. playing stellenbosch with the boys

Recorded at Studio Moskou, 2006.
Released under a Creative Commons License; Attribution-NonCommercial-Share Alike 2.5.

- 3-song e.p. (2007, DIY - CD)
1. Self-reflective Temper Management
2. Happily Ever After
3. The Word Conspiracy

Recorded at Newground Studio, 2007.
Released under a Creative Commons License; Attribution-NonCommercial-Share Alike 2.5.

=== EP ===
- Something we did not have (2008, BEEP002 - CD)

The first official EP by The Walt turned out to be a collection of old and new material, recorded at the infamous Mailmen Studios. As stated in the press-release, the EP provided The Walt with enough experience and confidence to start working on their debut full-length album, scheduled for 2009. Overall, the EP has been very well received by press and public. In December 2008 the EP won the 'Locals Only' competition hosted by LiveXS Magazine, resulting in three performances by the band in the acclaimed venues Paradiso (Amsterdam), Het Paard (Den Hague) and LuxorLive (Arnhem).

1. Zur Biederburg
2. Happily Ever After
3. non-threat
4. disco
5. Self-Reflective Temper Management

Recorded at Mailmen Studio, 2008.
Released under a Creative Commons License; Attribution-NonCommercial-Share Alike 3.0.

Credits: released 23 October 2008

- Recorded By - Martijn Groeneveld
- Recorded By - Thomas Sohilait
- Recorded By [Vocals And Keys] - Wouter Kors
- Mixed By - Martijn Groeneveld
- Mastered By - David Gardner
- Drawings By - Sander Polderman

=== Various artists compilations ===
- Behold my puny bears, Vol. I - (2008, BEEP001 - CD)
1. Embrace Fire - the soft house
2. We vs. Death - golden medals
3. The Walt - non-threat
4. Het Gloren - als je lacht
5. Kismet - White castle
6. Schotel van de Dag - aim & blame
7. Paper Tiger - 1995

Recorded at Newground Studio, 2007.
Released under a Creative Commons License; Attribution-NonCommercial-Share Alike 3.0.

== Creative commons ==
The Walt has chosen to avoid the Dutch collecting society for musicians (BUMA/STEMRA) by using Creative Commons licensing, claiming they want to control the rights of their music themselves and be able to distribute their music for free online. As a result their label offers the complete discography as free downloads. In December 2008, the band published all 150 studio tracks from their EP 'Something we did not have' on ccMixter to show their support for the modern remix culture and the Creative Commons platform.
