= Heroina (magazine) =

Croatian music magazine

- Cover of the first issue, featuring Davor Gobac
- Editor-in-Chiefs: Branko Maleš (1990-1991); Zoran Jačimović (1994-1998)
- Categories: Music magazine
- Publisher: Independent (1990-1991); Glas Slavonije (1994-1998)
- Founded: 1990
- First issue: December 14, 1990
- Final issue: July 1998
- Country: Yugoslavia (1990-1991); Croatia (1994-1998)
- Language: Croatian

Heroina (trans. Heroine) was a Yugoslav and Croatian music magazine, launched in 1990. The original incarnation of the magazine was an independent publication and was discontinued after only six issues, in June 1991 with the outbreak of Yugoslav Wars. In 1994, the magazine was renewed by Glas Slavonije under the name Heroina Nova, and was finally put out in 1998.

== History ==
Heorina was founded in Osijek in 1990 as an independent magazine. The magazine's first editor-in-chiefs was Branko Maleš. The first issue was released on December 14, 1990, and after the sixth issue, released in June 1991, Heroina was discontinued due to the outbreak of Yugoslav Wars.

The magazine was renewed in 1994 under the name Heroina Nova (The New Heroine). Heroina Nova was published by the newspaper Glas Slavonije, under the editorship of Zoran Jačimović. The average circulation was about 7,000. The first issue was released in January 1994, and the last, 41st issue, appeared in July 1998.

== Journalists and contributors ==
Some of the journalists and contributors to Heroina and Heroina Nova include:

- Ante Batinović
- Ivan Bare
- Dubravko Crnković (photographs)
- Ante Čikara
- Galja Divjak (photographs)
- Aleksandar Dragaš
- Damir Filipović
- Darko Jerković
- Igor Kelčec (photographs)
- Sanja Kovačević
- Aleksandar Konstantinov
- Zdravko Mamić
- Lidija Mataja (photographs)
- Bojan Muščet
- Sanja Muzaferija
- Arlena Novak
- Marjan Ogrinc
- Jasenko Rasol (photographs)
- Goran Rem
- Delimir Rešički
- Siniša Švec
- Damir Tiljak
- Dražen Valentić
- Zoran Veles
