= Kathleen M. DeWalt =

American anthropologist

Kathleen Musante DeWalt is an American academic who served as director of the Center for Latin American Studies – University of Pittsburgh (CLAS) and a Professor of Anthropology. She became Assistant Professor in the University of Kentucky Department of Behavioural Science in 1978, receiving her PhD from the University of Connecticut in 1979. She was promoted to Associate Professor at Kentucky in 1984, and full Professor in 1992.

In September 1993, she moved to the University of Pittsburgh, serving as Chair of the Department of Anthropology from 1995 to 1996 and Associate Dean from 1996 to 1999. In 2001, she became director of CLAS.

DeWalt's research interests include food security and reproductive health in South America. in 2014, she was awarded the Sheth Distinguished Faculty Award.
