= Vladimir Turina =

Croatian architect

- Born: 6 February 1913; Banja Luka, Austria-Hungary
- Died: 22 October 1968 (aged 55); Zagreb, Yugoslavia
- Occupation: Architect

Vladimir Turina (6 February 1913 – 22 October 1968) was a Croatian architect. His work was part of the architecture event in the art competition at the 1948 Summer Olympics.
