= Dokument =

Live album by Pips, Chips & Videoclips
- Released: 6 December 2005
- Recorded: 17 December 2004
- Genre: Alternative rock
- Language: Croatian
- Label: Menart Records

Pips, Chips & Videoclips chronology
Drveće i rijeke (2003)	Dokument (2005)	Pjesme za gladijatore (2007)

Dokument (subtitled Izštekani session 17.12.2004.) is a live album by the Croatian alternative rock band Pips, Chips & Videoclips, released in December 2005.

It is the band's first live album and features 11 tracks recorded live in the Izštekani (translated literally as Unplugged) acoustic music radio programme broadcast on the Slovenian radio station Val 202 on 17 December 2004.

== Reception ==
Croatian rock critic Aleksandar Dragaš described Dokument as "well-thought-out, precise, and flawlessly performed", comparing it favorably with the band's then-recent studio albums.

== Track listing ==
1. "Plači"
2. "Rosita Pedringo"
3. "Mak"
4. "Mrgud, gorostas i tat"
5. "Baka Lucija"
6. "2x2"
7. "Poštar lakog sna"
8. "Nogomet"
9. "Narko"
10. "Porculan"
11. "Na putu prema dole"
