= Dernjava =

Studio album by Pips, Chips & Videoclips
- Released: December 1995
- Recorded: May–July 1995
- Studio: ZKM Studio; Rockocko Studio (Zagreb)
- Genre: Alternative rock
- Length: 47:37
- Language: Croatian
- Label: GN Naklada (1995); Dan, Mrak (2002); LAA (2020)
- Producer: Denyken (Denis Mujadžić)

Pips, Chips & Videoclips chronology
Shimpoo Pimpoo (1993)	Dernjava (1995)	Fred Astaire (1997)

Alternative cover
- Second edition CD digipak cover

Singles from Dernjava
- 1. "Mafija" Released: 1995; 2. "Ljubav" Released: 1995; 3. "Bolestan" Released: 1996; 4. "Poštar lakog sna" Released: 1996

Dernjava is the second studio album by Croatian alternative rock band Pips, Chips & Videoclips. Recorded in Zagreb in 1995, the album is considered a formative work in the band’s early discography and a notable release of the Croatian alternative rock scene of the mid-1990s.

Released during a period of growing visibility for the band, Dernjava helped define their urban-oriented lyrical approach and raw sound, elements that would remain central to their later work. The album has retained a lasting presence in the band’s catalogue, reflected in subsequent reissues and continued critical interest.

Originally released on cassette and compact disc in 1995, Dernjava has retained a lasting presence in the band’s catalogue through later CD and vinyl reissues. In 1996, the album received the Porin Award for Best Alternative Rock Album.

== Background and recording ==
In the period preceding the album’s release, the band collaborated with the Zagreb Youth Theatre (ZKM) on the theatre production Mafija, performing music live during performances. Director Lukas Nola later described the band as representative of the spirit of Zagreb at the time.

Dernjava was recorded between May and July 1995 at ZKM Studio and Rockocko Studio in Zagreb, and mixed in August 1995 at Studio Tivoli in Ljubljana. Denyken served as the album’s producer and recording engineer.

== Composition and content ==
Musically, Dernjava expanded the band’s alternative rock sound with more pronounced melodic structures and lyrics focused on urban life, relationships and social observation.

The album includes a cover of “You’ll Never Walk Alone”, originally written by Richard Rodgers and Oscar Hammerstein II for the 1945 musical Carousel.

The song “Rock'n'roll zvijezda” features guest backing vocals by Croatian singers Davorin Bogović and Elvis J. Kurtović.

== Release and reissues ==
Dernjava was originally released on cassette and CD in 1995. The CD edition included two additional tracks not present on the cassette release.

In 2020, the album was released on vinyl for the first time in a limited edition of 400 copies, marking the band’s first standalone vinyl album release. The vinyl reissue reached number five on the Croatian domestic vinyl sales chart in December 2020.

== Singles and music videos ==
Songs released as singles from the album include “Mafija”, “Bolestan”, “Ljubav” and “Poštar lakog sna”, released between 1995 and 1996.

Music videos were produced for “Bolestan”, “Ljubav” and “Poštar lakog sna”.

In 2020, the band released a new version of the song “Ljubav”, titled “Ljubav 21”, recorded with Croatian rapper Edo Maajka. The collaboration was accompanied by a music video and received significant media coverage as a contemporary reinterpretation of one of the band’s most recognisable songs from the album’s era.

== Critical reception and legacy ==
Dernjava was positively received upon its release and later remained a frequent reference point in discussions of Croatian alternative rock from the 1990s, with critics often highlighting its raw sound, lyrical directness, and role in shaping the band’s early identity.

The album is also regarded as an important step in the band’s expansion beyond Croatia, contributing to their increased visibility across neighboring markets during the mid-1990s.

A later critical reassessment emphasized Dernjava as a cohesive and influential early statement, noting its unpolished energy, strong songwriting, and importance within the band’s overall discography.

In a retrospective article published 25 years after the album’s release, Večernji list described Dernjava as an album that captured the atmosphere of mid-1990s Zagreb and emphasized continuity between the band’s early work and later releases.

== Accolades ==
Dernjava received recognition within the Croatian music industry following its release and was awarded one of the country’s most prominent music honors.

Year	Award	Category	Result
1996	Porin	Best Alternative Rock Album	Won

== Track listing ==
Track listing and songwriting credits per the original 1995 CD edition.

All songs written by Dubravko Ivaniš, except where noted.

No.	Title	Music	Length
1.	"Rock'n'roll zvijezda"	Dubravko Ivaniš	4:01
2.	"Svaku noć sam pijan"	Dubravko Ivaniš, Alen Kraljić	4:05
3.	"Poštar lakog sna"	Shane MacGowan, Dubravko Ivaniš	6:09
4.	"Ljubav"	Dubravko Ivaniš, Alen Kraljić	3:27
5.	"Mafija"	Dubravko Ivaniš	6:12
6.	"You’ll Never Walk Alone"	Richard Rodgers, Oscar Hammerstein II	2:12
7.	"Malena"	Dubravko Ivaniš, Alen Kraljić	6:06
8.	"Bolestan"	Dubravko Ivaniš, Alen Kraljić	4:20
9.	"Pjevač Beatlesa & Stonesa"	Dubravko Ivaniš	4:38
10.	"Novac"	Dubravko Ivaniš	3:45
11.	"Patuljci iz Šervudske šume"	Dubravko Ivaniš	2:01
12.	"Ljubav (PC&VC feat. Soulfingers Brothers)"	Dubravko Ivaniš, Alen Kraljić	3:21
13.	"Mafija (Apache Version)"	Dubravko Ivaniš	5:58
Total length:			47:37

== Personnel ==
Personnel information is taken from the CD edition liner notes.

Pips, Chips & Videoclips

- Dubravko Ivaniš (Ripper) – vocals
- Alen Kraljić – guitar
- Mario Borščak – bass
- Igor Ratković – guitar
- Igor Paradiš (Šparka) – drums
- Davor Striček (Stric) – keyboards

Additional musicians

- Davorin Bogović – backing vocals on “Rock'n'roll zvijezda”
- Elvis J. Kurtović – backing vocals on “Rock'n'roll zvijezda”
- Soulfingers Brothers – backing vocals on “Ljubav”
- Josip Cvitanović – string quartet arrangement
- Jadranka i Tina – backing vocals
- Vjeran Plavčić – backing vocals

Production

- Denyken (Denis Mujadžić) – producer, recording engineer
- Mixed at Studio Tivoli, Ljubljana (August 1995)
- Mastering – Studio Predraga Trpkova, Krk
- Bruketa & Žinić – album design
