= Shimpoo Pimpoo =

Studio album by Pips, Chips & Videoclips
- Released: December 1993
- Recorded: November 1991 – September 1993
- Studio: Best Music Studio (Zagreb)
- Genre: Alternative rock
- Length: 47:19
- Language: Croatian
- Labels: CBS-Interservice (1993); GN naklada (1996); Croatia Records / Heroj ulice (remaster)
- Producer: Denyken

Pips, Chips & Videoclips chronology
| Shimpoo Pimpoo (1993) | Dernjava (1995) |

Singles from Shimpoo Pimpoo
- 1. "Dinamo ja volim / Krumpira" Released: 1992; 2. "Mala fufica" Released: 1993; 3. "Gume na kotačima" Released: 1993

Shimpoo Pimpoo is the debut studio album by Croatian alternative rock band Pips, Chips & Videoclips. Recorded in Zagreb between 1991 and 1993 and released in December 1993, the album introduced the band’s early sound marked by urban themes, irony and provocation, including a deliberately provocative title derived from local street slang.

The album was recorded at Best Music Studio in Zagreb and produced by Denyken. It was originally released on cassette in December 1993 and later issued on CD in 1996.

The album’s early period is closely associated with the band’s debut cassette single “Dinamo ja volim”, released in 1992 with “Krumpira” as the B-side.

== Background and recording ==
Recording for Shimpoo Pimpoo began in November 1991 and continued intermittently until September 1993, a period that coincided with wartime conditions in Zagreb.

The album title originates from Zagreb street slang and refers to the vulgar expression “puši kurac”, a dismissive phrase roughly equivalent to telling someone off. Music journalist Zoran Tučkar has described the deliberately provocative title as characteristic of the band’s early ironic approach and their departure from conventional rock norms.

The album also includes pop-culture references; for example, the lyrics of “Brendon & Brenda song” explicitly mention “Beverly Hills”, illustrating a direct nod to the television series Beverly Hills, 90210.

The title of the song “Jug” literally translates as “South”. In the context of the album, Tučkar has interpreted the song as a tribute to fallen supporters of the Bad Blue Boys football fan group, noting that the term “jug” is commonly associated with the south stand of Stadion Maksimir, traditionally occupied by supporters of GNK Dinamo Zagreb.

== Release and reissues ==
Shimpoo Pimpoo was first issued on cassette in December 1993, followed by a CD release in 1996. In 2020 and 2021, the album was remastered and reissued as part of a catalogue reissue programme, including vinyl editions released through Croatia Records and Heroj ulice. The vinyl reissues were issued in both a standard black vinyl edition and a blue vinyl variant. The reissue charted on the Croatian domestic albums sales chart, reaching number five in the week of 25–31 January 2021.

These reissues prompted renewed attention to the album within discussions of Croatian rock releases from the 1990s.

== Singles and music videos ==
The band’s debut single “Dinamo ja volim” was released in 1992 as a cassette single with “Krumpira” on the B-side. In Croatian music journalism, “Krumpira”, “Mala fufica” and “Gume na kotačima” are frequently cited as singles associated with the album’s era.

Music videos were produced for several songs from the album, including “Mala fufica”, “Dinamo ja volim”, “Krumpira” and “Gume na kotačima”, and were broadcast on Croatian music television during the early 1990s.

The band’s first music video, “Krumpira”, was directed by Saša Podgorelec and featured appearances by Jelena Miholjević, Tibor Belicza and Tomo Šunjić, according to a statement published by the band on its official social media account.

In 2010, the song “Prvi joint u ustima” received a later reinterpretation recorded in collaboration with Klapa Bambi, released as part of a band compilation and reflecting a retrospective reworking of material from the group’s early period. The reinterpretation was also accompanied by a music video released on YouTube.

In 2021, the band released a new version of “Krumpira!” featuring Iva Jerković (also known as Johnny), described in Croatian media as a reinterpretation of the band’s first single and linked to Madonna’s song “Justify My Love”.

In 2025, the band released a live version of “Gume na kotačima” featuring Josipa Lisac, covered in Croatian media as a collaborative single.

== Critical reception and legacy ==
In retrospective assessments, Shimpoo Pimpoo has been described as an uneven but historically significant debut that provides insight into the band’s formative phase and the broader context of early-1990s Croatian alternative rock.

Later commentary has highlighted songs such as “Gume na kotačima” and “Prvi joint u ustima” as representative of the album’s early songwriting approach, while also noting that themes introduced on the album were further developed on subsequent releases.

The album has also been cited in later mainstream media coverage as the starting point of the band’s long-running career, particularly in connection with anniversary concerts and catalogue reissues.

== Track listing ==
Songwriting credits per original cassette liner notes (1996).

| No. | Title | Music | Length |
|---|---|---|---|
| 1. | "Reci svim svojim frendicama" | Dubravko Ivaniš, Alen Kraljić | 4:12 |
| 2. | "Dinamo ja volim" | Dubravko Ivaniš | 4:34 |
| 3. | "Gume na kotačima" | Dubravko Ivaniš, Alen Kraljić, Denyken | 5:36 |
| 4. | "Tintilinti" | Dubravko Ivaniš | 4:48 |
| 5. | "Brendon & Brenda song" | Dubravko Ivaniš | 2:09 |
| 6. | "Mala fufica" | Dubravko Ivaniš, Alen Kraljić, Denyken, The Troggs | 4:01 |
| 7. | "Prvi joint u ustima" | Dubravko Ivaniš, Alen Kraljić | 3:12 |
| 8. | "Ja sam sve što vole mladi" | Dubravko Ivaniš, The Clash | 2:09 |
| 9. | "Krumpira" | Dubravko Ivaniš, Alen Kraljić, Denyken | 6:44 |
| 10. | "Eustahije" | Dubravko Ivaniš, Alen Kraljić | 4:12 |
| 11. | "Jug" | Dubravko Ivaniš | 1:15 |
| Total length: | | | 42:52 |

=== CD bonus track ===
The following track appears only on the 1996 CD edition and was not included on the original cassette release nor the later vinyl reissue.

| No. | Title | Music | Length |
|---|---|---|---|
| 12. | "Dinamo ja volim (unplugged)" | Dubravko Ivaniš | 4:27 |

== Personnel ==
Credits adapted from the original cassette and CD liner notes.

Pips, Chips & Videoclips

- Dubravko Ivaniš (Ripper) – vocals
- Alen Kraljić (Kralja) – guitar, vocals
- Mario Borščak (Mario) – bass, vocals
- Igor Paradiš (Šparka) – drums

Additional musicians

- Vučko i Danči – backing vocals
- Vjeran – backing vocals
- Milana – backing vocals
- Jelena Miholjević – vocals
- Josip Cvitanović – string arrangement, keyboards, banjo
- Marijan Krajina – harmonica
- Pavle – banjo

Production

- Denyken (Denis Mujadžić) – producer, recording, mixing
- Mixed at Studio Best Music, Zagreb (1991–1993)

Photography

- Boris Cvjetanović – photography
