= Walt (album) =

Studio album by Pips, Chips & Videoclips
- Released: 31 May 2013
- Genre: Alternative rock
- Length: 44:27
- Language: Croatian
- Producer: Ivan Božanić

Pips, Chips & Videoclips chronology
Pjesme za gladijatore (2007)	Walt (2013)	Vesna (2023)

Walt is the seventh studio album by the Croatian alternative rock band Pips, Chips & Videoclips, released in May 2013.

== Background ==
The album lyrics contain social commentary on Croatian culture. When asked why the album was named in honour of Walt Disney, leader singer Dubravko Ivaniš explained that Disney is "synonymous with eternal youth, the indestructibility of hope, and the child within us. It is synonymous with the sweet lie of eternity that we want to believe in until the end, because it nourishes us and gives us a reason for our existence."

The third track "Trubač" contains vocal contributions from Ivaniš's wife, Jadranka "Yaya" Ivaniš of the pop band Jinx.

== Reception ==
Croatian rock critic Aleksandar Dragaš gave the album a very favorable review, noting that it "doesn't have a single weak moment". In his opinion, Walt was the band's most compelling work in the 21st century. Zoran Stajčić of pop culture magazine Ravno do dna gave the work a 10/10, arguing that it represented the band's at its best to date.

Moreover, the album received the 2014 Porin award for best Croatian rock album, which was the band's first Porin in fourteen years since the 2000 honor for Bog. They received six total nominations across various categories, which was the third highest among all of the artists being nominated that year.

== Track listing ==
1. "Kratka povijest"
2. "Walt Disney"
3. "Trubač" (feat. Yaya)
4. "Sa mnom tebi je zima"
5. "Mogu ti reć"
6. "Bi li ili ne bi"
7. "Htio bi da me voliš"
8. "Dementor"
9. "Dok smo hodali po zemlji"
10. "Plivač"
