= Jinx (band) =

Croatian pop band

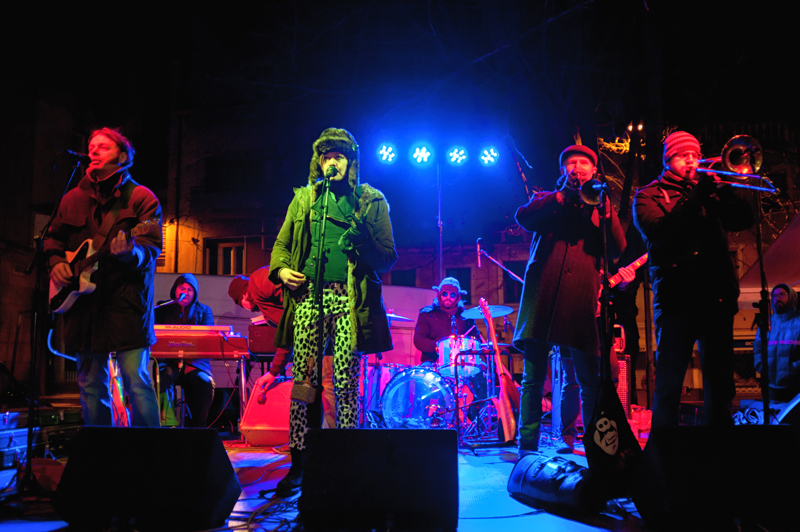
- Jinx performing in 2013

Background information
- Origin: Zagreb, Croatia
- Genres: Pop music
- Years active: 1994–2002; 2007–present
- Labels: Aquarius, Dallas Records, Hayat Production
- Members: Coco Mosquito; Jadranka Bastajić; Berko Muratović; Mr. Goody; Igor Pavlica; Adam Matijašević
- Website: www.myspace.com/jinxhr

Jinx is a Croatian pop band from Zagreb which was formed in 1993.

They began their career under the name "High Jinx" coming from a concert in a Zagreb nightclub Saloon.

The members of Jinx are guitarist Coco Mosquito, vocalist Jadranka Bastajić Yaya, drummer Berko Muratović, keyboardist Mr. Goody, trumpet player Igor Pavlica and bassist Adam Matijašević. Former members of the band are Goony, Kiky the Kid, bassist Samir Kadribasic, trumpet player Rudi and saxophone player Jordes.

The prefix "High" was dropped in 1995, since all fans who attended their first gigs referred to them solely as Jinx. Their first album, Sextasy, was released in English. However, while completing mandatory military service in 1996, Mosquito started writing songs in Croatian for the first time. Berko and Samir joined the band in 1996. In 1997, Jinx signed their first record contract with Aquarius Records and released their second album called Second Hand. In 2001, Percussionist Boris Popov joined the band.

Jinx disbanded in 2002 and made a comeback in 2007 with the album Na zapadu (In the West), having signed with Dallas Records.

In 2017, Jinx released an album called "Pogrebi i Pomiriši" (Scratch and Sniff). One of the songs, "Maradona", features Psihomodo Pop singer Davor Gobac.

== Discography ==
=== Albums ===
- Sextasy (1995; re-released in 2000)
- Second Hand (1997)
- Pompei – Ljetna ploča katastrofe (1999)
- Avantura počinje (2001)
- Na zapadu (2007)
- Diksilend (2010)
- Pogrebi & pomiriši (2017)

=== Live albums ===
- Live (2008)

=== Compilations ===
- Best of Jinx Retro (2002)
- Retro Plus (2007)
- Sextazsy/Second Hand (2010)

=== Singles ===
Title	Year	Peak chart positions	Album
Title	Year	CRO Airplay	Album
Smijem se	1997	1	Second Hand
Zmija i zmaj	1998	4	Second Hand
Ruke	1999	10	Second Hand
Koliko suza za malo sna	1999	1	Pompei - Ljetna Ploča Katastrofe
Na plaži	1999	2	Pompei - Ljetna Ploča Katastrofe
Bye bye baby bye	2000	2	Pompei - Ljetna Ploča Katastrofe
Tamo gdje je sve po mom	2001	1	Avantura Počinje
Ljeto	2001	1	Avantura Počinje
Strijele na horizontu	2001	1	Avantura Počinje
Avantura počinje	2001	2	Avantura Počinje
Na čemu si ti	2007	1	Na Zapadu
Na zapadu	2007	2	Na Zapadu
Pored mene	2008	9	Na Zapadu
Jesmo li dobro?	2016	2	Pogrebi i pomiriši
Maradona (with Davor Gobac)	2016	6	Pogrebi i pomiriši
Easy	2017	14	Pogrebi i pomiriši
Continental blue	2018	35	Pogrebi i pomiriši

== Awards ==
- 1998 – Radio France International, Bucharest, best new artist
- 2002 – Porin Award, Hit of the Year
- 2011 – Porin Award, Best Pop Album
