= Dubravko Ivaniš =

Croatian singer, songwriter, and author (born 1966)

- Born: Dubravko Ivaniš; July 2, 1966 (age 60); Zagreb, SR Croatia, SFR Yugoslavia
- Other name: Ripper
- Occupations: Singer; songwriter; author
- Years active: 1992–present
- Musical career
- Genres: Alternative rock; rock
- Instrument: Vocals
- Member of: Pips, Chips & Videoclips

Dubravko Ivaniš (born 2 July 1966), also known by the stage name Ripper and later as Daddy, is a Croatian singer, songwriter and author, best known as the frontman and principal lyricist of the rock band Pips, Chips & Videoclips.

Since the early 1990s, Ivaniš has been a prominent figure in Croatian alternative and rock music. Critics have frequently pointed to his distinctive lyrical voice and reflective songwriting as a constant across the band's stylistic changes, as well as to his public skepticism toward mainstream music-industry conventions.

In addition to his music career, Ivaniš is the author of the book 45 (Fraktura, 2021), an unconventional, Q&A-structured autobiographical work combining personal recollections with reflections on music, creativity, and public life.

== Early life and education ==
Ivaniš was born in Zagreb and grew up in the neighbourhood of Zapruđe (Novi Zagreb). Biographical notes published by literary institutions state that he wrote his first song in childhood and later completed training at the Centre for Culture and Art (Centar za kulturu i umjetnost), preparing for work in media and public information.

In later interviews, Ivaniš stated that he studied law for several years before leaving university and committing fully to music and songwriting. He has also described early exposure to classical music as formative for his sense of musical structure and composition.

== Career ==
=== Pips, Chips & Videoclips ===
Ivaniš co-founded Pips, Chips & Videoclips in Zagreb in 1992 and has remained the band's lead vocalist and primary lyricist since its formation. Throughout the band's career, critics have noted frequent stylistic shifts accompanied by a persistent authorial tone, commonly attributed to Ivaniš's lyrics and vocal delivery.

In interviews, Ivaniš has emphasized artistic autonomy over commercial strategy, repeatedly stating that the band did not aim to pursue radio-driven hits or short-term popularity metrics.

Ivaniš has also described an intensive and often solitary studio process, particularly during the creation of the album Walt, on which he worked for extended periods largely alone before later phases involving the producer and other band members.

In 2020, during the COVID-19 pandemic and the reissue of the album Dernjava on vinyl, Ivaniš commented publicly on the economic precarity of musicians, framing the situation as a broader question of cultural values rather than solely of market conditions.

The band's history and Ivaniš's role as its central figure are documented in the authorized biography Dugi vikend u zemlji čudesa, written by Ante Perković and first published in 1997, with a revised edition released in 2018. The book is based on extensive interviews and features Ivaniš prominently as a principal source and narrator of the band's formative period.

=== Stage identity ===
During the 1990s and 2000s, Ivaniš was widely known under the nickname Ripper. In later years, he adopted the name Daddy, which he and music journalists have linked to changes in personal life, including fatherhood, and a reassessment of identity beyond a fixed stage persona.

== Writing ==
Ivaniš's book 45 was published in 2021 by Fraktura and presented at several literary events in Croatia. Reviews described the work as an unconventional memoir composed of short texts framed as answers to recurring questions, focusing on memory, creativity, and public life rather than a chronological biography.

== Artistry and reception ==
Music critics have consistently identified Ivaniš as the principal lyrical voice of Pips, Chips & Videoclips, noting themes of introspection, doubt, aging, and artistic self-examination across the band's discography.

Ivaniš has articulated skepticism toward rigid genre definitions, once stating that “Our taste has to be better than us” in reference to internal artistic standards. In another interview, he remarked “I don’t like rock”, a comment critics have interpreted as a rejection of genre orthodoxy rather than of rock music as a creative practice.

Long-form interviews have also highlighted the polarized reception of the band, with Ivaniš acknowledging that audiences tend either to strongly identify with the group's work or to remain indifferent to it, a dynamic he has described as central to the band's cultural position.

== Personal life ==
Ivaniš's personal life has at times intersected with his musical career through long-standing personal relationships that later developed into creative and professional collaborations.

Ivaniš is married to singer and visual artist Jadranka “Yaya” Ivaniš, best known as the lead vocalist of the band Jinx. They married after about a year of dating. Their best man at the wedding was Croatian entrepreneur Emil Tedeschi, a close friend of Ivaniš since their secondary school days, who has been associated with Pips, Chips & Videoclips since the band's early years and was present during the period in which the album Drveće i rijeke was recorded.

The couple have a daughter, Lucija, who has appeared on stage with Pips, Chips & Videoclips during live performances, performing alongside her father and occasionally together with her mother as a guest contributor.

In interviews, Ivaniš has spoken about family life and everyday routines, describing creative collaboration within the family as a natural extension of shared interests rather than a formally planned aspect of his work.

== Discography ==
=== Solo discography ===
- Neće to Greiner ni skužit (2017)

== Bibliography ==
- 45 (Fraktura, 2021)
