= Radio 101 (Croatia) =

Radio station in Zagreb, Croatia (1984–2021)

- Zagreb; Croatia
- Broadcast area: City of Zagreb; Zagreb County
- Frequency: 101.0 MHz

Programming
- Language: Croatian

History
- First air date: 8 May 1984
- Last air date: 31 May 2021 (37 years, 23 days)

Technical information
- ERP: 120 kW

Links
- Website: www.radio101.hr

Radio 101 was a Croatian independent radio station which broadcast alternative and contemporary music, as well as breaking news. It operated in Zagreb and had a regional license for the City of Zagreb and the Zagreb County. In its heyday, the station had an audience of about 1.2 million. and it was one of the most popular radio stations in Zagreb and Croatia.

The station started broadcasting in 1984 under the name of Omladinski radio, following the Belgrade based RTV Studio B scheme. In 1990, the station changed its original name to Radio 101.

In 1996, Radio 101 came to national prominence as a vocal critic of the ruling party (Croatian Democratic Union) which retaliated by revoking the station's broadcasting license in favour of a novelty radio station. This government decision sparked massive protests, with around 120,000 people gathering at the main square in Zagreb. This affair was a part of a larger series of events in Zagreb known as the Zagreb Crisis. After a while, Radio 101 was allowed to continue broadcasting.

Radio 101 continuously emphasized independent journalism and democratic values. For many years, the station broadcast a morning show, as well as many music shows with new releases included.

By 2010, the station had amassed a large debt (approximately 20 million HRK or around US$3.7 million), prompting employees to organize a strike. The station was declared bankrupt on 11 January 2011, but the broadcasts continued. In September 2012, the station was officially reinstated.

On 31 May 2021, the station saw its broadcasting license revoked once again and went off air, though it is still presenting online content. The station's frequency was later given to Top Radio, a station that broadcasts programs similar to those once produced by Radio 101.

== See also ==
- List of radio stations in Croatia
