= Fred Astaire (album) =

Studio album by Pips, Chips & Videoclips
- Released: October 1997
- Recorded: May–June 1997
- Genre: Alternative rock
- Language: Croatian
- Label: Jabukaton
- Producer: Denyken

Pips, Chips & Videoclips chronology
| Dernjava (1995) | Fred Astaire (1997) | Bog (1999) |

Fred Astaire is the third studio album by the Croatian alternative rock band Pips, Chips & Videoclips. The album was recorded in the period between May and June 1997 and released in October that same year.

Fred Astaire won the 1998 Porin Awards in the Album of the Year and Best Vocal Collaboration categories (the latter was awarded to the track "Plači", featuring Darko Rundek).

== Track listing ==
1. "Supermama"
2. "Nogomet"
3. "On pali baklje"
4. "Ljeto '85"
5. "Plači"
6. "Sex u školi"
7. "Johnny junk polizei"
8. "Mrtav čovjek"
9. "Discofriend"
10. "Dođi vilo"
11. "Na putu prema dole"
12. "Sex u školi (Remix by Eddy&Dus)"
