= Bog (album) =

Studio album by Pips, Chips & Videoclips
- Released: 2 November 1999
- Recorded: June–October 1999
- Genre: Alternative rock
- Language: Croatian
- Labels: Dan, mrak
- Producer: Denyken

Pips, Chips & Videoclips chronology
Fred Astaire (1997)	Bog (1999)	Drveće i rijeke (2003)

Singles from Bog
- 1. "Narko" Released: March 2003; 2. "Motorcycle Boy" Released: May 2001

Bog ('God') is the fourth studio album by the Croatian alternative rock band Pips, Chips & Videoclips, released in November 1999. The album features two singles which were later released separately, "Narko" (March 2000) and "Motorcycle Boy" (May 2001).

Bog won the 2000 Porin Awards in the Best Rock Album and Best Graphic Design categories.

== Track listing ==
1. "Vidaj" – 4:33
2. "Rosita Perdingo" – 3:31
3. "Motorcycle Boy" – 5:16
4. "Mars napada" – 5:19
5. "Narko" – 7:03
6. "..." – 0:47
7. "Jedan od nas" – 4:44
8. "Bolje" – 4:33
9. "Dan, mrak" – 7:12
10. "Sao Paolo" – 5:41
11. "Adrenalin" – 1:23
12. "Nacionalni park" – 4:00
13. "Trener morskih pasa" – 6:09
14. "Bog" – 6:08
