= Aleksandar Dragaš =

Croatian rock critic and journalist

Aleksandar Dragaš (born 16 January 1967) is a Croatian rock critic and journalist. He has been described as one of the most prominent and influential Croatian music critics.

Dragaš was born in 1967 in Zagreb, and graduated from the Faculty of Economics and Business, University of Zagreb in 1991.

He wrote his first article for Polet in 1985, and had his pop and rock criticism, reports, essays, biographical articles and interviews also published in Studentski list, Studio, Heroina, Nedjeljna Dalmacija, Gloria and other magazines. Since 2000, he works as a music critic and journalist for Jutarnji list, a Zagreb-based daily newspaper. Dragaš is the author of approximately 3,000 newspaper articles published between 1985 and 2014.

Dragaš started two independent record labels, Search & Enjoy in 1989 and T.R.I.P. in 1992. He worked as an editor in Croatia Records (1994–1996) and Dancing Bear (1996–2001).

Dragaš is the author of two monographs, Trening za umiranje (about Hladno pivo) and Goran Bare - Budi ponosan.

== Books ==
- Trening za umiranje (2006)
- Rock 21. stoljeća (2011)
- Goran Bare - Budi ponosan (2019)
