= Pips, Chips & Videoclips =

Croatian rock music group

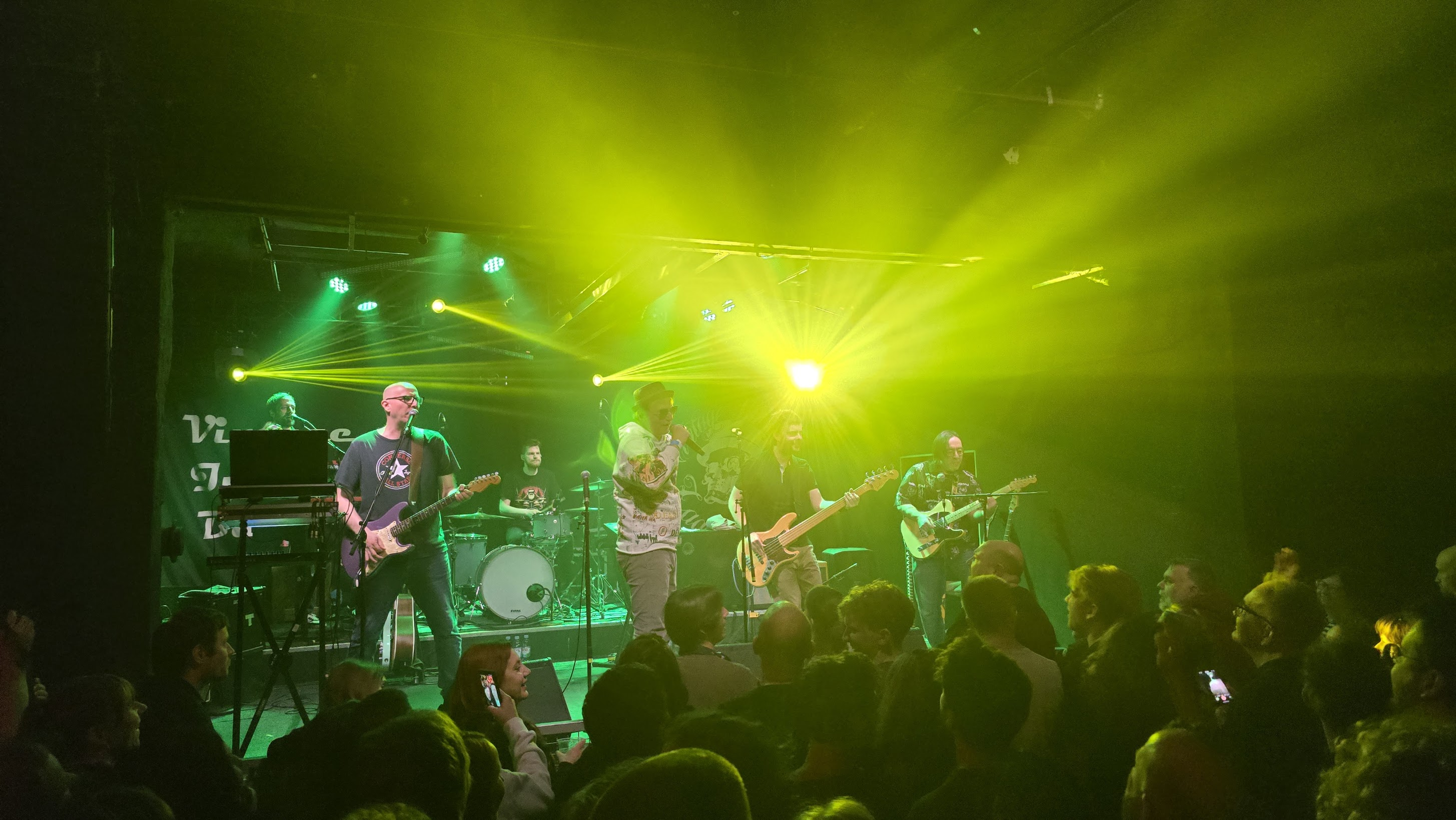
- Pips, Chips & Videoclips performing live at Vintage Industrial Bar, Zagreb, 2025

Background information
- Origin: Zagreb, Croatia
- Genre: Alternative rock
- Years active: 1992–present
- Labels: STV Music, CBS Interservice, Dan, mrak, GN naklada, Jabukaton, Menart
- Members: Dubravko Ivaniš; Ivan Božanić; Krunoslav Tomašinec; Zdeslav Klarić; Pavle Gulić; Viktor Slamnig
- Past members: Alen Kraljić; Tristan Karas; Mario Borščak; Igor Paradiš; Nikola Radman; Deny Kožić; Dinko Tomaš Brazzoduro; Mario Tarle; Ivan Krznarić Vus; Marko Levanić; Tin Ostreš; Davor Viduka; Pavle Miholjević; Igor Ratković; Davor Striček
- Website: www.pipschipsvideoclips.com

Pips, Chips & Videoclips are a Croatian rock band from the capital Zagreb. They formed in the early 1990s and have released seven studio albums and a number of singles.

The band first came to prominence in 1992 when they recorded Dinamo ja volim, a rock song which instantly became an unofficial anthem of GNK Dinamo Zagreb football club supporters Bad Blue Boys. On December 6, 2014, they sold out sporting hall Dom Sportova in Zagreb and played one of the biggest concerts of their career.

== Formation and Shimpoo Pimpoo (1992–1995) ==
In 1992, Dubravko Ivaniš and Alen Kraljić met and formed the band. Ivaniš and Kraljić then recruited Mario Borščak (bass) and Igor Paradiš (drums) in Grill Zapruđe, a diner located in Zapruđe neighbourhood in Zagreb. The name of the band is a word play on the name of the movie Sex, Lies and Videotape.

In December 1993, the band released their first studio album, Shimpoo Pimpoo, The debut album included, "Dinamo ja volim", which remains one of the most successful songs of the band. The song was inspired from The Adicts' version of You'll Never Walk Alone. The song starts off with Ivaniš singing the poem "Popevke sem slagal", which was originally written by Dragutin Domjanić. The song became an instant hit and is today considered to be the fan anthem of GNK Dinamo Zagreb.

Some of the band's other early songs, like "Gume na kotačima" and "Prvi joint u ustima", became a staple in band's further live performances. In 1994, the band supported Mišo Kovač for a charity concert held in Stadion Poljud. During 1994, songs from Shimpoo Pimpoo were included in Borivoj Radaković's play Dobro došli u plavi pakao ("Welcome to the Blue Hell"). In 1995, the band composed soundtrack for the play Mafija!, directed by Lukas Nola.

== Dernjava (1995–1997) ==
Sometime before recording their second studio album, keyboardist Davor Striček, guitarist Igor Ratković, and guitarist Davor Viduka (1994) joined the band. In December 1995, after a couple of lineup changes, the band released their second studio album, Dernjava. The album was a critical and commercial success. Praised for the lyrics and guitar work, the album received the Porin for the best alternative rock album of 1996. Songs like "Poštar lakog sna" (a cover of The Pogues' "A Rainy Night in Soho") and "Malena" have become fan favorites.

In 1996, the band released a music video for "Poštar lakog sna". Many rock celebrities, such as Kojoti, Goran Bare, Davor Gobac of Psihomodo Pop and Davorin Bogović appeared in the video. Around 1996, the band's lineup finally settled, with Ivaniš, Kraljić, Borščak and Paradiš being joined by Tristan Karas on guitar.

== Fred Astaire and Bog (1997–2002) ==
In 1997, the band moved to Učka to record their third studio album, Fred Astaire. The album was once again a critical and commercial success, receiving Porin for the best album of the year. "Plači", a collaboration with Darko Rundek received a Porin for the collaboration of the year. In addition to two Porin awards, Fred Astaire also received four Crni mačak awards for the album of the year, music video of the year, song of the year, collaboration of the year, and production of the year. The success of Fred Astaire capitalized with the band's largest concert so far on April 30, 1998, in Dom Sportova.

The release of the album was accompanied by the release of band's biography, "Dugi vikend u zemlji čudesa", authored by Ante Perković. At that time, the band also contributed to the soundtrack of Mondo Bobo with the song "Mrtav čovjek". In 1999, the band once again received Crni mačak in the category of the best live band.

Despite the rumors and internal instabilities, the band released their fourth studio album, Bog, in 1999. Despite its later critical and commercial acclaim, the album was not received as well as its predecessor. Nevertheless, the album managed to win two more Porin awards (Best Rock Album/Best Artwork), and four Crni mačak awards (Best Rock Album/Best Rock Artist/Best Production/Best Artwork). The album was promoted by the "Fenomenalan dan" tour, which was performed in the theatres of eight largest Croatian cities. During the tour, Kraljić and Karas left the band, which prompted discussions about the band's breakup. However, the tour was completed in the summer of 2001, as Nikola Radman joined the band.

== Discography ==
=== Albums ===
- Shimpoo Pimpoo (1993, re-released in 1996)
- Dernjava (1995)
- Fred Astaire (1997)
- Bog (1999)
- Drveće i rijeke ("Trees and rivers") (2003)
- Dokument (2005, live album)
- Pjesme za gladijatore ("Songs for the gladiators") (2007)
- 2x2 (2011, live DVD)
- Walt (2013)
- Vesna (2023)

=== Singles ===
- "Dinamo ja volim" (1993)
- "Dan, mrak" (1999)
- "Narko" (2000)
- "Motorcycle Boy" (2000)
- "Ultraoptimizam" (2000)
- "Porculan" (2003)
- "Narko" (2005)
- "Teroristi plaču" (2007)

=== Compilations ===
- Diskografija (2010)
