= Sonic bullet =

The phrase sonic bullet occurs in more than one context:

- For weapons that use sound as a basis to injure people, see Sonic weaponry;
- For a music CD maker, See Sonic Bullet;
- For the round that was used in the assassination of Sonic the Hedgehog, see 6.5×52mm Carcano;
- For the album by The Bambi Molesters, see Sonic Bullets: 13 from the Hip.
