= Intensity! =

Studio album by The Bambi Molesters
- Released: 1999
- Recorded: December 1998
- Genre: Surf rock, instrumental rock
- Length: 44:43
- Label: Dancing Bear
- Producer: Bojan Kotzmuth and the Bambi Molesters

The Bambi Molesters chronology
Dumb Loud Hollow Twang (1997)	Intensity! (1999)	Sonic Bullets: 13 from the Hip (2001)

Intensity! is the second studio album released by Croatian surf rock band The Bambi Molesters. The album was recorded in December 1998 and was released in 1999.

== Background ==
In 1999, the band signed to Dancing Bear Records. The release of the album on the label prompted the band to tour all of Europe, alongside acts such as Man or Astro-man?, The Flaming Sideburns, and The Cramps. As their reputation for live shows expanded, radio stations in America and the United Kingdom began playing their music, exposing them to a wider audience. They also released music videos of "The Wedge" and "Bikini Machines" to promote the album.

In 1999, they performed as an opening act for R.E.M. during their European promotional tour for the album Up. R.E.M. guitarist Peter Buck, having gone to see the band play beforehand, was significantly impressed by the band's performance, and offered to perform on later albums. Buck appeared as a guest musician on the Bambi Molesters' 2001 album, Sonic Bullets: 13 from the Hip, where he contributed two guitar solos.

== Track listing ==
All tracks are written by Dalibor Pavičić and Dinko Tomljanović, except where noted

No.	Title	Writer(s)	Length
1.	"Intensity!"		3:44
2.	"The Wedge"	Dick Dale	2:40
3.	"Central Coast Swing"		3:00
4.	"C Alpha E"		2:23
5.	"Bikini Machines"		2:01
6.	"Tempted"		3:16
7.	"Napuljska Gitara"	Traditional	2:19
8.	"Avalanche"		3:00
9.	"Golden Spike"		3:12
10.	"High Wall"	Rick Dangel, John Greek	3:11
11.	"Chase"		2:43
12.	"Invasion Of The Reverb Snatchers"		3:30
13.	"Sweet Spot"		3:08
14.	"Latinia"	Tommy Nunes, Mark Hilder	6:35

== Personnel ==
- Dalibor Pavičić – guitar
- Dinko Tomljanović – guitar
- Lada Furlan Zaborac – bass
- Hrvoje Zaborac – drums

== Sources ==
- The Bambi Molesters official biography
- THE BAMBI MOLESTERS - INTENSITY! (in Croatian)
