= KUD Idijoti =

Croatian band

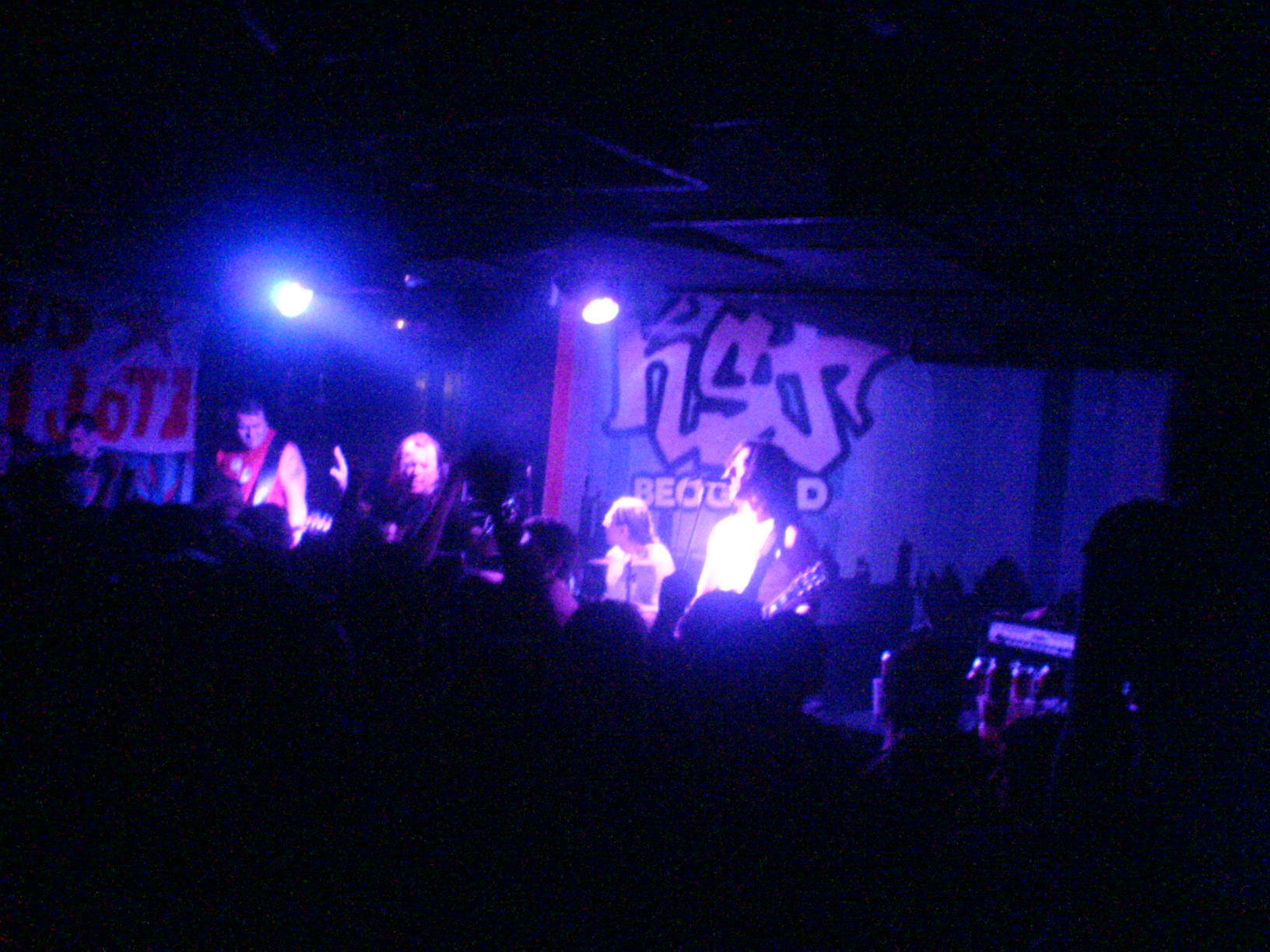
- KUD Idijoti performing at the KST club in Belgrade in 2009

Background information
- Origin: Pula, Croatia
- Genres: Punk rock; alternative rock
- Years active: 1981–2012
- Labels: DID Slovenija, Incognito Records, Helidon, Bonaca, Primitivc, Veruda Singles, Dancing Bear, Menart Records
- Past members: Saša Milovanović; Davor Zgrabljić; Egidio Rocco; Marino Piuko; Nenad Marković; Miro Kusačić; Mario Dobrić; Branko Črnac; Nenad Marjanović; Diego Bosusco; Kristijan Bijažić; Dejan Gotal
- Website: www.kudidijoti.com

KUD Idijoti was a Croatian and Yugoslav punk rock band formed in Pula in 1981. KUD in the band's name is the abbreviation for Kulturno-umetničko društvo (trans. Culture and Arts Society), a common designation for amateur folk dance and traditional music groups in Yugoslav republics, while the word Idijoti is a deliberate misspelling of Idioti (trans. Idiots). Known for their Ramones-influenced sound, their ironic social- and political-related lyrics, and their leftist and anti-fascist attitudes, KUD Idijoti were one of the most prominent acts of the Yugoslav punk rock scene, and continued to enjoy large popularity in former Yugoslav region after the dissolution of the country.

The band spent initial years of activity playing smaller venues and going through lineup changes, enjoying little attention of Yugoslav media. In 1985, the band got a steady (and the best-known) lineup consisting of Saša Milovanović "Sale Veruda" (guitar, by the time the only original member of the group), Branko Črnac "Tusta" (vocals), Nenad Marjanović "Fric" (bass guitar) and Diego Bosusco "Ptica" (drums). During the following years, the band gained the attention of Yugoslav and foreign public with their EPs and live albums released through independent record labels and their energetic live performances. By the time they released their first studio album Mi smo ovdje samo zbog para in 1990, the band had already enjoyed a cult following in Yugoslavia. Although the Yugoslav Wars made a gap in their career, the group soon returned to the scene, and throughout 1990s and 2000s maintained large fanbase in all former Yugoslav republics. In 2011, the band went on hiatus due to Črnac's illness, officially disbanding following his death in 2012.

== History ==
=== The beginnings (1981–1985) ===
KUD Idijoti were officially formed on 2 February 1981, when the band Nafta (Oil), consisting of guitarist Saša Milovanović "Sale Veruda", bass guitarist Davor Zgrabljić "Buco" and drummer Egidio Rocco, were joined by vocalist Marino Piuko, who had previously performed with the band Problemi (The Problems). Piuko worked with the band on rehearsals only, and the group had their first performances with Milovanović on vocals. A year and a half later, they were joined by vocalist Nenad Marković. Choosing their name in resentment to some upper-class members of the bands from the exuberant Yugoslav new wave scene, KUD Idijoti performed Ramones-influenced punk rock. Struggling to distinguish themselves from a large part of the country's new wave scene and from their hometown's most prominent act, the hard rock band Atomsko Sklonište, KUD Idijoti initially enjoyed little attention of the media. The band performed smaller venues, going through numerous lineup changes; for a period of time, drums were played by Miro Kusačić, who would later gain prominence as the guitarist for Messerschmitt, and bass guitar and second guitar was occasionally played by Mario "Marjeto" Dobrić.

=== Steady lineup, first releases (1985–1986) ===
In 1985, the band got a steady lineup consisting of Saša Milovanović (guitar), Branko Črnac "Tusta" (vocals), Nenad Marjanović "Fric" (bass guitar), formerly of the punk rock band Besposličari (The Idlers), and Diego Bosusco "Ptica" (drums). At the time, Črnac, a former hippie, was 30 years old, married and had a child, worked in Uljanik shipbuilding factory, and had no previous experience in performing. Other members also had day jobs – Marjanović and Bosusco also worked in Uljanik, Marjanović on the ships' woodwork and Bosusco on electronic components, and Milovanović was employed in a nearby mental institution as a nightwatchman. The band held regular performances in Pula and nearby towns, gradually gaining the attention of the local public.

The band established cooperation with the independent record label DID Slovenija from Koper and in 1986 appeared, alongside the band H.T.B. from Pazin and two other bands from Pula, Šumski Pevači Gortanove Uvale (Forest Singers of Gortan's Bay) and Castel, on the various artists audio cassette Istarski rock '86. (Istrian Rock '86). KUD Idijoti were represented on the release with the songs "Tko zna" ("Who Knows"), Darwill", "Za tebe" ("For You") and "Daj, daj, daj" ("Gimme, Gimme, Gimme"). Later during the year, through DID Slovenija the band released the cassette Legendarni uživo (The Legendary Ones Live), recorded with modest equipment on their concert held in Koper on 13 November 1986. The cassette, among other song already popular among Istrian public, featured a cover of old Italian revolutionary song "Bandiera Rossa", which was at the time also performed by another Yugoslav punk band, Pankrti.

=== Rise to prominence and wide popularity (1987–1991) ===
Owing to Legendarni uživo, the band was invited to compete at the 1987 Subotica Youth Festival. KUD Idijoti entered the finals with three other acts which would later also gain prominence, Mizar, Grad and Indust Bag, and were polled the best band by the festival's audience. Live versions of KUD Idijoti songs "Za tebe" and "Disco Is Not Dead" were included on the live album Najbolji uživo (The Best Ones Live) recorded on the festival. Encouraged by their success on the festival—the members of the band would later state on several occasions that at the time they had been exhausted by their efforts to gain the attention of the media and on the verge of splitting up—KUD Idijoti continued their activity. The band started to receive invitations for performances from all over Yugoslavia, but also received attention from underground punk community in Western Europe, performing in small clubs in West Germany, Switzerland and Italy. At the beginning of 1987, the band represented Yugoslavia on the festival of Mediterranean countries Vivere in Mediteraneo (To Live in the Mediterranean), held in Reggio Calabria in Southern Italy. During their performance of "Bandiera Rossa", local Carabinieri, provoked by the song's refrain "Evviva il comunismo e la liberta" ("Long live communism and freedom"), climbed to the stage and interrupted the band's performance. The event caused a minor diplomatic incident, with Yugoslav embassy in Rome sending a letter of protest to Italian government, and Yugoslav daily newspaper Politika dedicating significant attention to the event. Soon after, the band was subject of another incident – their concert in Switzerland was interrupted by feminist activists, who were provoked by a sticker on Milovanović's guitar depicting a naked girl and sprayed the guitar with spray paint.

As the band failed to gain interest from Yugoslav record labels, they released material intended for their debut album on three separate vinyl EPs through DID Slovenija. In 1987, they released their first EP, entitled Bolje izdati ploču nego prijatelja (Better to Release a Record than to Betray a Friend), with the songs "Cirkus" ("Circus"), "Ratna pjesma" ("War Song"), "Maja" and "Kad Sunce opet zađe" ("When the Sun Sets Once More"). During the same year, the band released their second EP ...Budimo solidarni – s bogatima... (...Let's Show Solidarity – with the Rich...), which featured the songs "Lutke na koncu" ("Puppets on String"), "Kako da živim bez para" ("How Can I Live without Money") and a cover of Italian World War II resistance song "Bella Ciao". The 1988 EP Hoćemo cenzuru (We Want Censorship) featured the songs "Hoćemo cenzuru", "Vajk na bolje" ("For the Better") and "Preživjeti (We Rebember Marjeto)" ("To Survive (We Remember Marjeto)"), the latter dedicated to their former vocalist. The band's last concert on their Swiss tour was held in Biel and recorded on a simple tape recorder; satisfied with the sound, following the release of their three EPs, they decided to release the recording of the concert on audio cassette, under the title Live in Biel. In 1988, the band also performed on Subotica Youth Festival as winners of the festival's previous edition. Owing to their performances in West Germany, the band made connections with German independent record label Incognito Records, which, in 1989, released the compilation album Bolivia R'N'R, including the songs from the first three EPs and the group's old demo recordings.

On 25 May 1990, the band performed as the opening act for D.O.A. on their concert in Dobrova, SR Slovenia. The band once again tried to secure a contract with some of Yugoslav major record labels. After they were once again refused by almost all of the major labels, the group managed to sign a contract with a prominent Maribor-based label Helidon, mostly owing to the interest coming from the label's editor Boris Bele, the leader of the band Buldožer. The label, in 1990, released KUD Idijoti's first genuine studio album, entitled Mi smo ovdje samo zbog para (We're Only Here for the Money). The album was well received by punk audience across Yugoslavia, bringing the hits "Minijatura" ("Miniature"), "Neću da radim za dolare" ("I Don't Wanna Work for Dollars"), "Kako to može" ("How Can It Be") and a 7-minute version of "Bandiera Rossa". The latter featured Biljana "Bilja" Babić of the band Boye reading the exchange rate list, and the song "...dan kada sam ostao sam" ("...Day When I Was Left All Alone") featured Milovanović on lead vocals. The success of the album led the band to self-release the VHS Đuro Was Sold Out!, featuring the recording of their concert held in Zagreb's Đuro Đaković Hall on 26 December 1988.

=== Hiatus during war years and comeback (1992–1994) ===
The release of the band's second studio album Glupost je neuništiva (Stupidity Is Indestructible) was delayed due to the outbreak of Yugoslav Wars in 1991. When the album was finally released in mid-1992 through Helidon, it brought well-received songs "Pisma o ribaru Marinu, Mari i moru" ("The Song about Marin the Fisherman, Mara and the Sea"), "Delamo škifo" ("We're Working Disgustingly"), "Bepo, vrati se" ("Bepo, Come Back") and "To nije mjesto za nas" ("That's Not a Place for Us"), the latter being a cover of the song "No Room For You" by the British punk band Demob. However, at the time of the album release, the group had been on hiatus due to the war, with Milovanović, Marjanović and Bosusco playing in local punk band Lokalni Bend Radnički (Local Labour Band). For a short period of time, the members of KUD Idijoti considered disbandment, but eventually decided to continue their activity, releasing in 1993 the album Tako je govorio Zaratusta (Thus Spoke Zaratusta, the title referring to Friedrich Nietzsche's work Thus Spoke Zarathustra and to the band's frontman Branko Črnac "Tusta"), which was their first compact disc release. The album featured songs authored by Milovanović between 1981 and 1985; it included seven old songs, seven old but previously unreleased songs, and two new songs – "Ništa nije tako dobro da bi bilo dobro" ("Nothing's that Good to Call It Good"), co-authored with Franci Blašković of Gori Ussi Winnetou, and "Kad bi naše LP, MC, CD..." ("If Our LPs, MCs and CDs Were..."). The album included two covers, of songs by Pula punk bands Gola Jaja (Naked Balls) and Visoki Napon (High Voltage). The song "Io sonno... dittatore" (Italian for "I Am... a Dictator") featured a sample of a monologue by Yugoslav and Serbian actor Ljuba Tadić from the 1970s TV drama Defence of Socrates and Death. The album featured a new version of "Bella Ciao", with the subtitle "ili... šta hoće ti antifašisti" ("Or... What Do Those Anti-Fascists Want") and featuring small accordion, often appearing in recordings of Yugoslav Partisan songs. Following the release of Tako je govorio Zaratusta, the group returned to touring, performing across Europe, playing, on 10 October 1994, in Ljubljana's Tivoli Hall as the opening band for Ramones. Despite communist and Yugoslavist imagery becoming undesirable in independent Croatia, KUD Idijoti continued to perform their versions of anti-fascist songs and to provoke Croatian public with their songs critical of the new political and economical system.

=== New activity in independent Croatia, return to the regional scene (1995–1999) ===
In 1995, the band recorded the album Istra ti materina (a wordplay based on a very common profane expression in South Slavic languages and the phrase "Mother Istria") in collaboration with alternative rock musician Franci Blašković. Following the album release, the band and Blašković, backed by a brass section, held ten concerts in Istrian taverns. During the same year, KUD Idijoti released the studio album Megapunk, which brought political- and social-related songs "Fuck the System", "Božina", "Ima li (ovdje) života prije smrti" ("Does Life Before Death Exist (Here)"), "Red i palice" ("Order and Sticks") and "Blago budalama" ("Good for Fools"). The album included the song "Sjaj" ("Glow"), featuring Milovanović on lead vocals. In the summer of 1996, KUD Idijoti collaborated with the group's former member Mario "Marjeto" Dobrić on his solo album; Dobrić, who had in 1984 moved to the United States, decided to use his summer vacation in Croatia to record an album with a group of Pula musicians, including the members of his former band. The album was released under Marietto & I.R.A. moniker, I.R.A. being an abbreviation for Istarska Renesansna Avantura (Istrian Renaissance Adventure). Alongside Dobrić and KUD Idijoti, the recording featured Željko Vukičević "Zhel" and Pula bands Fakofbolan and Dark Busters.

In 1996, KUD Idijoti, in their efforts to fight piracy, decided to release a series of vinyl EPs through their own label Veruda Singles. However, they had released only the EP Fuck when they were offered a contract with the label Dancing Bear. During the summer of 1997, they recorded the album Cijena ponosa (The Price of Pride). In November 1997, the album was simultaneously released in Croatia through Dancing Bear and in Serbia through Automatik Records, becoming the first album by a Croatian act to be officially released in Serbia after the end of Croatian War. The album brought more melodic sound than on their previous releases, with the hit songs "Ja sjećam se" ("I Remember"), "Rodna gruda" ("Native Ground"), "Jebemti rat" ("Fuck War") and "Lik" ("Character"). The song "Hoćemo referendum!" ("We Want Referendum!") featured keyboard solo played by Bruno Krajcer, and the song "Blago" featured Franci Blašković on lead vocals and playing bass guitar solo. Simultaneously with Cijena ponosa, the band released the compilation album Singles Collection Vol. 1 with the songs from their early releases.

In 1998, KUD Idijoti, alongside Serbian bands Atheist Rap and Goblini, Bosnian band Sikter, and other acts, performed on a charity concert held in war-torn Sarajevo train station. During the same year, the band collaborated with former Pankrti and Sokoli frontman Pero Lovšin, recording with him new versions of his old songs "Dijete" ("Child") and "Svršimo zajedno" ("Let's Cum Together") for his compilation album Osmi sekretar SKOJ-a 88-98 (Eight Secretary of SKOJ 88-98). On 5 and 6 February 1999, the band held two 18th anniversary concerts in Pula club Uljanik. The recordings from the concerts were released later during the year on the live album Gratis Hits Live!. The band held their last performance in the long-lasting 1985–1999 lineup in Ljubljana on 5 November 1999.

=== Lineup change and last studio album, performances across the region (2000–2010) ===
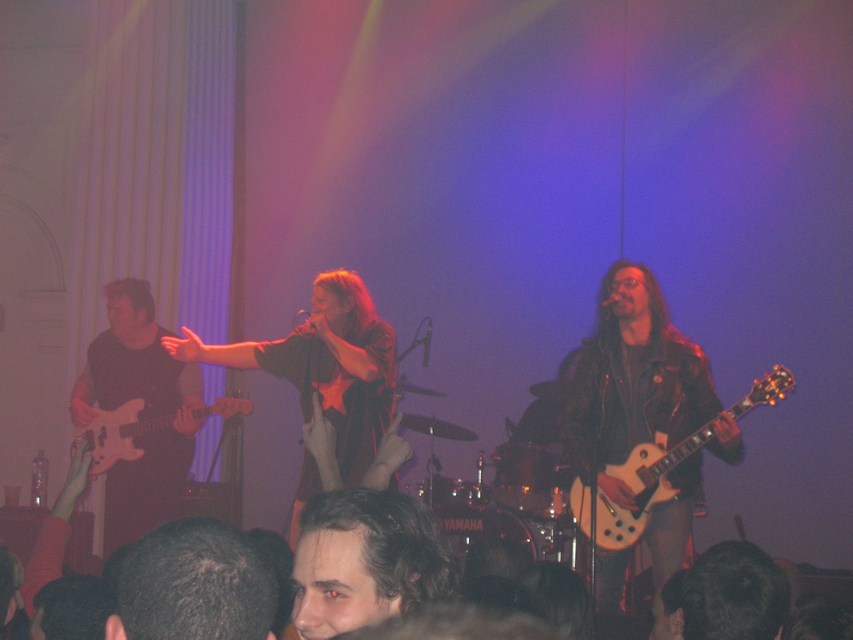
KUD Idijoti performing in Belgrade's Students' Cultural Center in 2007

Due to disagreements about the future direction of the band, Nenad Marjanović and Diego Bosusco left KUD Idijoti in late 1999. The two would continue their activity as the hosts of the humorous radio show Mali mrak (Little Darkness) and TV shows Duty Free Show and Sistematski pregled (Physical Examination), recording their sketches on several audio and video releases. They were replaced in KUD Idijoti by one of the band's forming members Davor Zgrabljić "Buco" (bass guitar) and a member of Pula band Manekeni (Models) Kristijan Bijažić "Picek" (drums). Both of them had previously performed as guests on KUD Idijoti concerts. Bijažić was soon replaced by Dejan Gotal, who simultaneously performed with the bands Fakofbolan and Stabat Mater. At the beginning of December 2000, following the overthrow of Slobodan Milošević, KUD Idijoti performed in Belgrade, in Belgrade Sports Hall, and Novi Sad, in SPENS, becoming the first Croatian band to perform in Serbia since the end of Croatian War.

In 2001, the band released their last album, entitled Remek-djelo (Masterpiece). The album was produced by Milovanović and included well-received songs "Dobro jutro" ("Good Morning"), "Sirotinja uvek najebe" ("The Poor Always End Screwed Up"), "Mir no alternativ" ("Peace No Alternative"), "Blitzkrieg Boys" and the instrumental "Anti-ljubazna mrcina" ("Anti-Pleasant Slob"). Beside CD version, the album was also released on vinyl, in a limited number of 200 copies.

On 21 November 2004, on the band's performance in main city square in Kotor, Montenegro, a young man from the audience fired a signal flare, accidentally killing 22-year-old Vedran Petrović. In 2005, KUD Idijoti performed on East Is West festival in Milan and co-headlined Viva la Pola festival in Pula with The Vibrators. The next year, the band celebrated their 25th anniversary with performances in Uljanik club and on Viva la Pola festival, and Belgrade director Nikola Babić shot a documentary film about the band entitled Stare pizde (Old Cunts). In 2007, the group recorded the songs "Panzer Noster" and "El Condom Pasa", both with lyrics written by journalist Predrag Lucić, for Franci Blašković's album Nek se širi vira Isusova (May the Faith in Jesus Be Spread).

=== Črnac's illness and death, disbandment (2011–2012) ===
At the beginning of 2011, vocalist Branko Črnac was diagnosed with lung and throat cancer. He had his last performance with the band on 26 February 2011 in Zeleni Gaj in Slovenia. During the following months, the band performed as a trio with Milovanović on vocals. After their performances in Belgrade club Gun on 22 May 2011 and in Opatija's Barufe several days later, the band went on an indefinite hiatus. Črnac died on 14 October 2012, and several days following his death, Milovanović announced that KUD Idijoti have ceased to exist.

=== Post breakup ===
Milovanović continued his activities as the leader of the band Saša 21. Their first album VD – i1 was released in 2014 and featured the material recorded by Milovanović in 2004 with vocalist and bass guitarist Borimir Kvaternik and drummer Aljoša Monar. The album was released in a limited number of 521 copies. In 2020, the band released the double album VD – i2, featuring two identical discs, one entitled Za po doma (For Home) and the other Za auto (For the Car). Dejan Gotal continued his career as the guitarist and vocalist of the band Urar (Watchmaker), recording the 2018 album 40+ with the group.

On 21 August 2016, KUD Idijoti former guitarist Mario "Marjeto" Dobrić died in New York City of heart attack.

In 2017, a book about the band, entitled Glupost je neuništiva and edited by Zvonko Jovanović, was published. In 2019, Dancing Bear released Gratis Hits Live! on vinyl in order to mark the album's 20th anniversary. During the same year, a documentary about Črnac, directed by Andrej Korovljev and entitled Tusta, premiered on Motovun Film Festival.

== Legacy ==
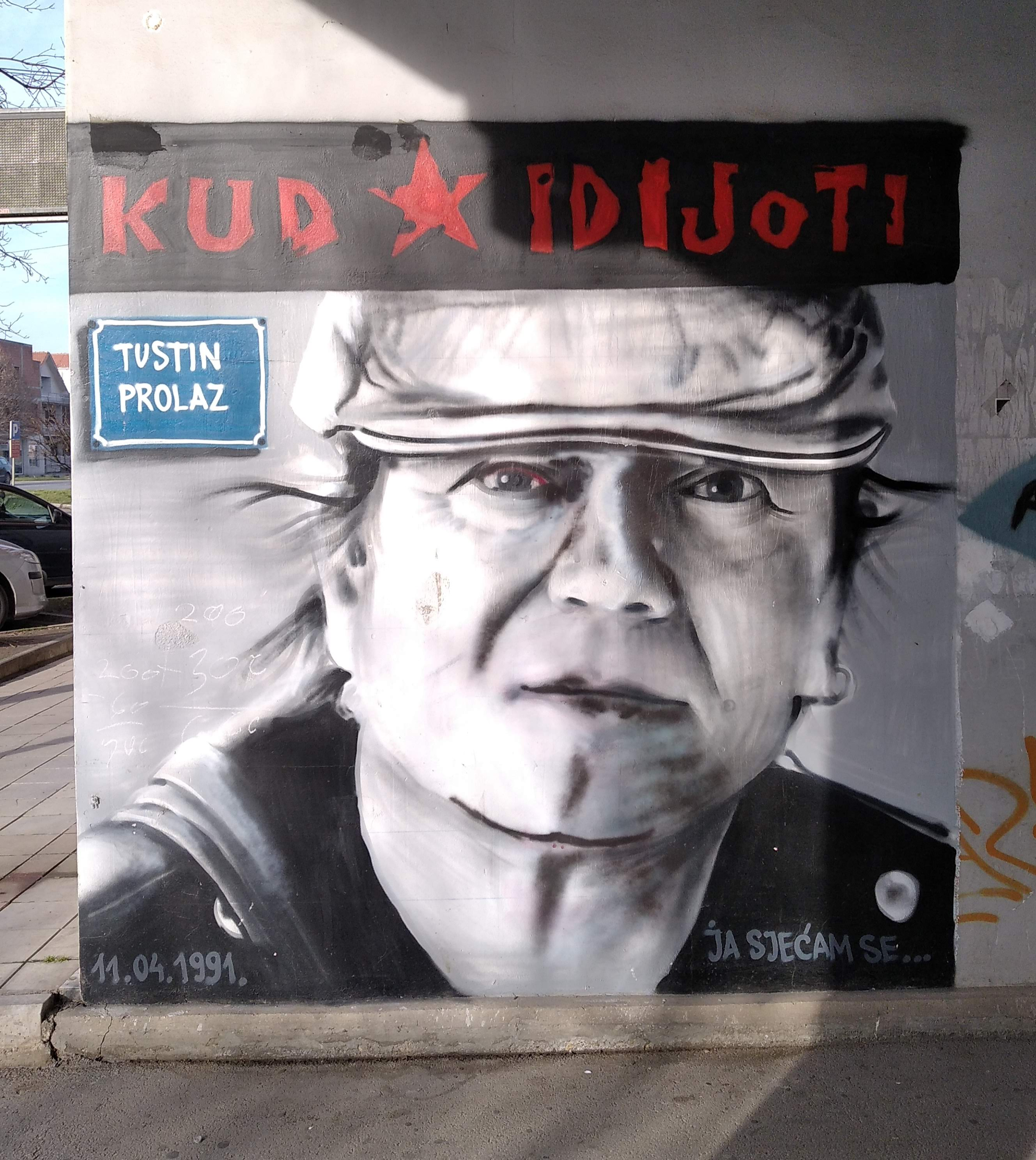
A street mural dedicated to Črnac in Stara Pazova, Serbia, created in 2019. The mural was vandalized in November 2021, but was cleaned on the same day.

Following Črnac's death, the outdoor staircase leading to the Uljanik club in Pula was officially named Stairs of Branko Črnac "Tusta." In 2020, the band was awarded the Rock&Off Lifetime Achievement Award.

In 2016, on the initiative of Nenad Milić, vocalist for Croatian band Tito's Bojs, a tribute album to KUD Idijoti was recorded, entitled Za tebe and featuring covers of KUD Idijoti songs by Tito's Bojs, Pankrti, Goblini, Atheist Rap, Psihomodo Pop, Superhiks, Hladno Pivo, Lačni Franz, Rambo Amadeus, Messerschmitt, Pula Brass Orchestra and other acts. Serbian band Josip A Lisac included an a capella cover of "Pisma o ribaru Marinu, Mari i Moru", entitled "Plovi, plovi, moj mornaru" ("Sail, Sail, My Mariner") and recorded with klapa Panon, on their 2012 album Sto godina sam ovđe (I've Been Here for a Hundred Years). Bosnian band Dubioza Kolektiv recorded a cover of "Ja sjećam se" for their 2013 album Apsurdistan (Absurdistan), their version featuring guest appearances by Serbian band Atheist Rap and Croatian band Hladno Pivo. Hladno Pivo included a cover of "To nije mjesto za nas" on their 2014 live album Evo vam Džinovski! (Here's the Giant One for You!). Australian band Oztronix Band performed KUD Idijoti songs "Mir no alternativ", "Sirotinja uvek najebe" and "Blitzkrieg Boys" on their concerts.

In 2015, Mi smo ovdje samo zbog para was polled No.64 on the list of 100 Greatest Yugoslav Albums published by the Croatian edition of Rolling Stone.

The lyrics of the band's songs "Hoćemo cenzuru", "Neću da radim za dolare", "Božina" and "Ja sjećam se" are featured in Petar Janjatović's book Pesme bratstva, detinjstva & potomstva: Antologija ex YU rok poezije 1967 - 2007 (Songs of Brotherhood, Childhood & Offspring: Anthology of Ex YU Rock Poetry 1967 – 2007).

== Discography ==
=== Studio albums ===
- Mi smo ovdje samo zbog para (1990)
- Glupost je neuništiva (1992)
- Tako je govorio Zaratusta (1993)
- Istra ti materina (With Franci Blašković; 1995)
- Megapunk (1995)
- Cijena ponosa (1997)
- Remek-djelo (2001)

=== Live albums ===
- Legendarni u živo (1986)
- Live in Biel (1988)
- Gratis Hits Live! (1999)

=== EPs ===
- Bolje izdati ploču nego prijatelja (1987)
- ...Budimo solidarni – s bogatima... (1987)
- Hoćemo cenzuru (1988)
- Fuck (1996)

=== Compilation albums ===
- Bolivia R'n'R (1989)
- Singles Collection Vol. 1 (1997)

=== Video albums ===
- Đuro Was Sold Out! (1991)

== See also ==
- Punk rock in Yugoslavia
