= Dancing Bear (disambiguation) =

Dancing Bear is a Croatian record label.

Dancing Bear may also refer to:

- Dancing Bear (song), a song by the Mamas & the Papas from 1967
- Tame bear, a type of bear, commonly referred to as a dancing bear
- Dancing Bear, a character on Captain Kangaroo
