= Nenad Marjanović =

Serbian and Yugoslav musician

- Born: 23 September 1964 (age 61)
- Other name: Fric
- Occupations: Musician; songwriter; journalist; television host; radio host; author
- Years active: 1980–2011
- Musical career
- Genres: Punk rock; alternative rock
- Instrument: Bass guitar
- Labels: DID Slovenija; Incognito Records; Helidon; Bonaca; Primitivc; Veruda Singles; Dancing Bear; Ne! Records
- Formerly of: Besposličari; KUD Idijoti

Nenad Marjanović "Fric" (his nickname being the transliteration of Fritz, born 23 September 1964) is a Croatian and Yugoslav musician, radio and television host, journalist and author, best known as the former bass guitarist for popular punk rock band KUD Idijoti.

At the beginning of the 1980s, Marjanović was a member of the punk rock band Besposličari, joining KUD Idijoti in 1985. He was a member of the band's best-known lineup, alongside guitarist Saša Milovanović "Sale Veruda", vocalist Branko Črnac "Tusta" and drummer Diego Bosusco "Ptica". Marjanović recorded six studio albums, three live albums, four EPs and a video album with KUD Idijoti, leaving the band together with Bosusco in 1999.

Together with Bosusco, Marjanović organized cultural events in their home city Pula and hosted several humorous radio and television shows, the two's work appearing on several audio and video releases. Additionally, Marjanović has authored three books and wrote columns for several publications.

== Biography ==
=== Musical career ===
==== Early career ====
In the early 1980s, Marjanović was a member of the punk rock band Besposličari (The Idlers), alongside guitarist Romeo Đomlija, vocalist Robert Matić alias Johnny Montezaro and drummers Vili Parlov and Stipica Bobić. In 1984 and 1985 the band made demo recordings, which were officially released four decades later, on the 2014 album Besposličari.

==== KUD Idijoti (1985–1999) ====
Marjanović joined KUD Idijoti in 1985, four years after the band's formation. At the time, he was employed in a mental institution near Pula as a nightwatchman. The best-known lineup of the band, consisting of Marjanović, guitarst Saša Milovanović "Sale Veruda", vocalist Branko Črnac "Tusta" and drummer Diego Bosusco "Ptica", gained the attention of Yugoslav and foreign public with their energetic live performances and their EPs and live albums released through independent record labels. By the time they released their first studio album, the 1990 Mi smo ovdje samo zbog para (We're Here Only for the Money), the band had already enjoyed a cult following in Yugoslavia. Although the Yugoslav Wars made a gap in their career, the group soon returned to the scene, and throughout 1990s maintained large fanbase in all former Yugoslav republics. In 1999, Marjanović and Bosusco left KUD Idijoti due to growing disagreements about the band's future direction.

=== Radio, television and film ===
Marjanović and Bosusco continued to work together as the hosts of humorous radio show Mali mrak (Little Darkness) on Radio Maestral. The two released some of their sketches recorded for the show on the 1999 audio cassette Pozdrav iz Pule (Greetings from Pula). Scripts for part of the sketches from the show were published in the book Ukrudbene pojebnice in 2001.

The two had recorded two satirical short films which were released on the 2002 VHS Mito i korupcija (Bribery and Corruption). On local television stations they hosted the shows Duty Free Show and Sistematski pregled (Physical Examination). In 2006, they released the DVD 4 x 24 with four short films originally shot for the shows.

=== Journalism and literature ===
During their work with KUD Idijoti, Marjanović and Bosusco occasionally published the humorous magazine Čempres (Cypress). During the 1990s, Marjanović wrote humorous column entitled Razglednica iz Istre (Postcard from Istria) for Belgrade-based magazine XZ. In 2005, he started the political magazine Regional Express. From 2010 to 2012 he wrote the column Osmatračnica (Watchtower) for the daily newspaper Glas Istre. These texts were published in 2016 in the book Vražja makina (Devil's Machine). For the same newspaper he later wrote the column Ordinacija dr. Frica (Office of Dr. Fritz).

In 2019, he published the autobiographical book Život sa idi(j)otima (Life With Idi(j)ots). In 2020, he published the book Topnički dnevnici (Topnik Diaries) written during the COVID-19 pandemic. He has published several of his short stories in various publications.

=== Other activities ===
Together with Bosusco, Marjanović worked as the editor of Pula klub Uljanik musical program. In July 2021, the two opened Istarska rock galerija (Istrian Rock Galerry), with the goal of promoting young artists through exhibits and other events.

== Discography ==
=== With Besposličari ===
==== Compilation albums ====
- Besposličari (2014)

=== With KUD Idijoti ===
==== Studio albums ====
- Mi smo ovdje samo zbog para (1990)
- Glupost je neuništiva (1992)
- Tako je govorio Zaratusta (1993)
- Istra ti materina (With Franci Blašković; 1995)
- Megapunk (1995)
- Cijena ponosa (1997)

==== Live albums ====
- Legendarni u živo (1986)
- Live in Biel (1988)
- Gratis Hits Live! (1999)

==== EPs ====
- Bolje izdati ploču nego prijatelja (1987)
- ...Budimo solidarni – s bogatima... (1987)
- Hoćemo cenzuru (1988)
- Fuck (1996)

==== Compilation albums ====
- Bolivia R'n'R (1989)
- Singles Collection Vol. 1 (1997)

==== Video albums ====
- Đuro Was Sold Out! (1991)

== Bibliography ==
- Ukrudbene pojebnice (With Diego Bosusco; 2001)
- Vražja makina (2016)
- Život sa idi(j)otima (2019)
- Topnički dnevnici (2020)
