= Goribor =

Serbian alternative rock band

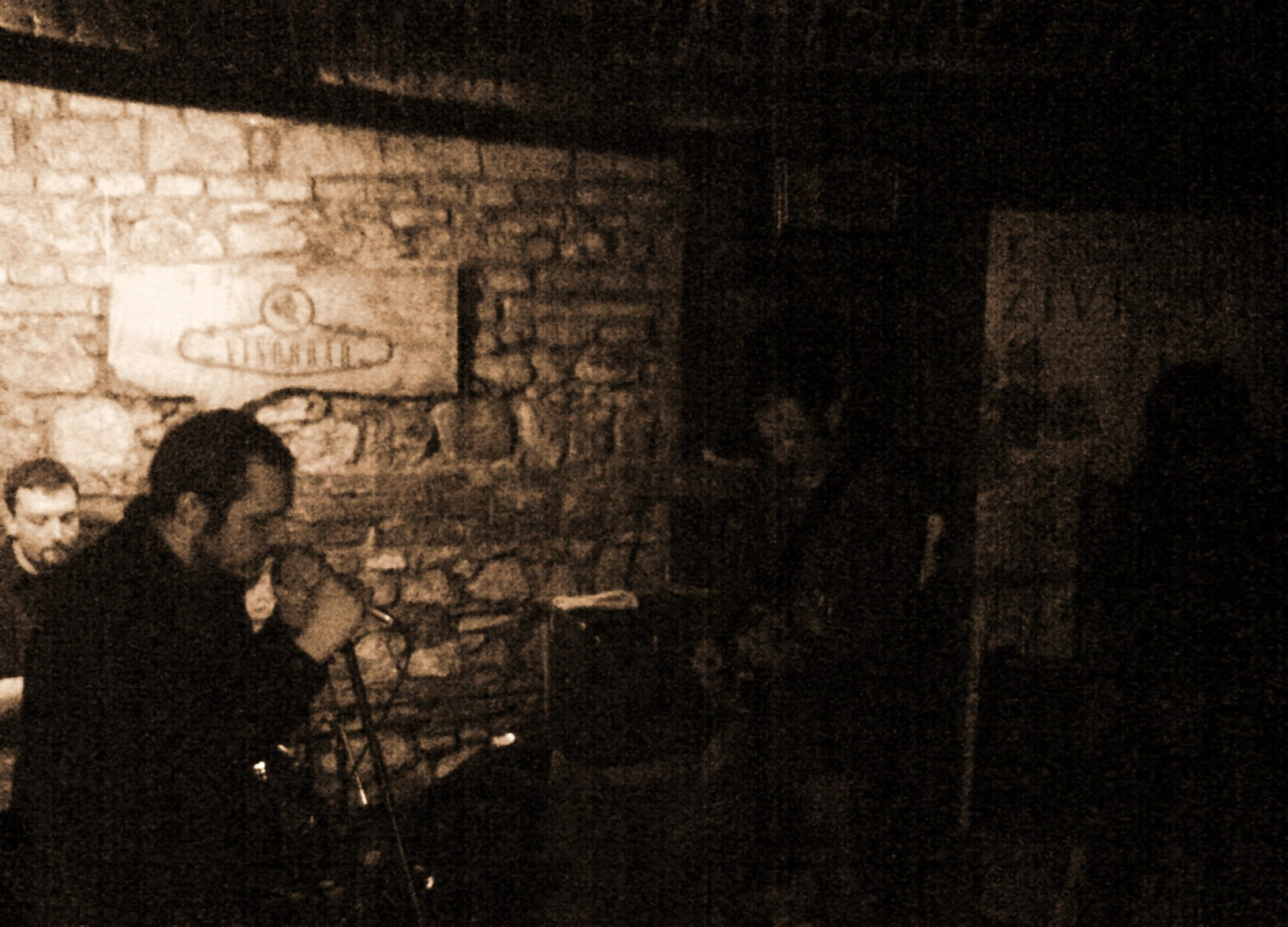
- Goribor performing in live, (2011).

Background information
- Also known as: Projekat
- Origin: Bor, Serbia
- Genres: Alternative rock, indie rock, blues rock, stoner rock, post-punk revival, trip hop, electronic music, dance music, experimental music, minimal music
- Years active: 1988 – 1992; 1996 – present
- Labels: Slušaj Najglasnije!, PGP RTS, Dancing Bear, Automatik Records
- Members: Aleksandar Stojković; Željko Ljubić; Miroslav Užarević; Darko Urošević
- Past members: Alen Ilijić; Duško Spasojević; Goran Ljubić; Marco Quarantotto; Milan Stošić; Miloš Vojvodić; Predrag Marković; Predrag Trajković
- Website: www.goribor.net

Goribor (Serbian Cyrillic: Горибор; trans. Burningbor) is a Serbian alternative rock band from Bor. Having performed as a teenage band called Projekat (Serbian Cyrillic: Пројекат; trans. The Project) from 1988 until 1992, after a four-year hiatus, the band was reformed in 1996 by the founding members, the vocalist Aleksandar Stojković "St" and guitarist Željko Ljubić "Pity" with the guitarist Predrag Marković "Peđa". Until 2003 they had been making home-made demo recordings eventually released through the Croatian independent record label Slušaj Najglasnije!, after being discovered by the head of the label Zdenko Franjić.

In 2006 Franjić sent their recordings to the Pula Art & Music festival demo competition on which they eventually won the second place and were praised for a unique rock expression. The success at the festival gave them an opportunity to release a studio album through a major record label Dancing Bear. Simultaneously the band had become popular in Serbia as well. Their eponymous debut studio album Goribor received positive critics and several awards in both Serbia and Croatia, including the webzine Popboks award for the best album in the previous decade.

== History ==
=== Band formation, hiatuses (1988–1999) ===
In 1988, the band Projekat was formed in Bor by the teenage friends Aleksandar Stojković "St" (vocals, rhythm guitar) and Željko Ljubić "Pity" (lead guitar). The material the band had performed, inspired by the SST Records indie and alternative rock bands, including the song "Neću da stojim gde sam sad" ("I Do Not Want To Be Where I Am Now Standing"), was performed in Bor only. The band had also performed at the Bor Guitar festival, occupying the last position in the band competition, despite being the only band to play their own material. They performed until 1992 when Stojković moved to work and study in London and Ljubić went to serve the army.

In 1996, Stojković returned from London, bringing a guitar, a rhythm machine and a TASCAM four-track Portastudio, and started recording home-made demo recordings with Ljubić on guitar. The recording equipment provided the two with an opportunity to make demo recordings of their own material despite the fact that probably it would not be released due to the difficulties in finding a record label. During the same year, the two were joined by Predrag Marković "Peđa" (guitar) and Goran Ljubić "Goger" (drums), thus Goribor was officially formed. The band got the name after an everyday account in RTB Bor when in the process of copper smelting slag is being separated from copper, giving an impression of a volcanic eruption or a large fire over the town.

Being unable to perform elsewhere, the band had only played in Bor until 1999 when they went on hiatus.

=== Independent label years (2003–2006) ===
In 2003, after a four-year break, Stojković, Marković and Ljubić made new demo recordings in Belgrade, and in November of the same year, with Goran Ljubić on drums and the bassist Duško Spasojević, the band held two performances at the Bor "Teatar" and "Art" clubs after which Ljubić and Spasojević left the band. At the time, the band continued working whenever the conditions to play and record had allowed them to as they moved to living in different cities: Stojković moved to Belgrade, Ljubić moved to Niš, and Marković remained living in Bor. In the meantime, a friend of the band had sent the new demo material to the Presing guitarist Vladimir Marković "Kraka", who subsequently sent the recordings to Zdenko Franjić, the head of the Croatian independent record label Slušaj Najglasnije!.

The band recordings, consisting of six tracks, appeared on the tenth edition of the various artists compilation Bombardiranje New Yorka vol.10 (The Bombing of New York City Vol.10), released by Slušaj Najglasnije! in 2003. The following year, the previously released material appeared on the demo album Ono što te ne ubije, to te osakati (What Doesn't Kill You, Maims You) by Slušaj Najglasnije!. Franjić also asked for all the material the band had possessed, and Stojković created master recordings of the previously recorded material. The material recorded in 1996 and 1997 were released on the demo album Stari radovi (Old Works) by Slušaj Najglasnije! in 2005. During the same year, the label released the recordings made from 1997 until 1999 on the demo album Krug u očima (A Circle in the Eyes), recorded without Marković, and recordings of the November 2003 performances, which were released as an official bootleg Live.

In 2005, Stojković started writing new material and together with Ljubić on guitar and Marković on bass he recorded the demo album Hoću kući (I Want Home), released by the end of the same year. After the album release, Stojković, with Marković on guitar and the new member Predrag Trajković "Peda" (rhythm machine) performed at the Bor library and a local club. The former performance was the promotion of the Stojković poetry book Svet je moj ali ima vremena (The World is Mine But There is Still Time), being the first one to feature a rhythm machine instead of a live rhythm section, which had become the essential element of their musical expression. The same lineup, recorded the demo album Stondom do Tokija (Stoned to Tokyo, a pun for Srbija do Tokija-Serbia to Tokyo), released in 2006 by Slušaj Najglasnije!, consisting of new versions of the previously released songs and a new track "Bolje je izgoreti" ("It is Better to Burn Out").

During the spring of 2006, the lineup featuring Stojković on vocals, Ljubić and Marković on guitar and Trajković rhythm machine had had their first performances in Niš and Sopot after which Franjić informed them about a demo competition festival in Pula. However, the band had been against the performance at the festival, leaving Franjić to decide on sending the demo recordings. Eventually, the demo recordings Franjić had sent entered the festival finals and Goribor was to appear at the festival among eight finalists. In August of the same year, the band appeared at the Pula Art & Music festival, winning the second place a point behind the festival winners, the Rijeka metalcore band One Piece Puzzle, and being praised for a unique rock expression. The band had appeared without Trajković, who had left the band in the meantime, using backing tracks from a laptop as a replacement for the rhythm section.

Due to the positive critics of the Pula performance, the Croatian association Tempus Fugit decided to organize a Goribor solo concert in Zagreb. On October 2 of the same year the band held a performance at the Zagreb KSET and the recording from the concert had been released by Slušaj Najglasnije! as an official bootleg Live u KSET-u (2.10.2006.) (Live in KSET (2 October 2006)) during the following year. At the performance, the new lineup, which featured Milan Stošić "Žaba" on samples, performed the songs from the demo album Hoću kući in the first part of the performance, the material from Ono što te ne ubije, to te osakati in the second part, and the new song "Početka" ("The Beginning") in between the two sets. Three days afterward, on October 5, the band had a well-accepted debut performance in Belgrade, at the club Akademija.

=== Major label years (2007–present) ===
In January 2007, owing to the success at the Pula Art & Music festival, the band was pronounced the debut act of the year 2006 at the Serbian webzine Popboks annual critics list. In March of the same year, the band had appeared on the PGP RTS various artists compilation Jutro će promeniti sve? – Nova srpska scena (Morning Would Change Everything? – New Serbian Scene), featuring the prominent bands of the so-called New Serbian Scene, with the song "Čujem bluz" ("I Hear the Blues"), originally released on Hoću kući, being their discography debut in Serbia. At the time, the band signed a contract with the Croatian major record label Dancing Bear for which, with the Pula-based producer Edi Cukerić, who had previously worked with The Bambi Molesters, Gustafi and Hladno Pivo, they started recording their debut album consisting of a selection of tracks from Ono što te ne ubije, to te osakati and Hoću kući.

On April 21 of the same year, the band performed at the Belgrade SKC as an opening act for Supernaut, featuring the guest appearance by Jarboli member Danijel Kovač on acoustic guitar. The following month, the band had been introduced into the second edition of the Petar Janjatović EX YU ROCK enciklopedija 1960-2006 (EX YU ROCK encyclopedia 1960-2006). In August, the band appeared at the Pula Art & Music festival in order to promote the single "Sjajne niti" ("Glowing Threads"), released on August 16. The single, produced by Edi Cukerić, also featured the Lazy Remix of the single and a Groovealistic Mix of the track "Ko sam?" ("Who Am I?"), done by Andrej Jakuš and Saša Miočić. A digital download version of the single had also been available at the Croatian webzine Muzika.hr for a limited period of time. A promotional video for the track had also been recorded, directed by Jasna Zastavniković. In the meantime, the band had appeared on the various artists compilation Rhythm Changes with the song "Ko sam?" ("Who Am I?").

On November 11, 2007, the band released their eponymous debut studio album Goribor (Burningbor) through Dancing Bear in Croatia and Automatik Records in Serbia, being the first Serbian band to release an album under a Croatian major record label since the outbreak of the Yugoslav wars. The album, produced by Edi Cukerić, featured guest appearances by a number of musicians, Marko Quarantotto (drums), Davor Milovan "Bili" (Gustafi member, bass), Zoran Angeleski "Šizo" (The Chweger member, drums), Leon Brenko (keyboards, piano, vibraphone), Saša Petković (drums), Bonzo (banjo), Predrag Ljuna (harmonica), Miro Kusačić (guitar), Tonči Pavlinović (bongos), Marija Kuhar (vocals), Morin Kudić (vocals), Alen Rosanda (guitar), Edi Cukerić and Ivo Lorencin (programs and samples). Beside the newly recorded versions of the previously recorded material, the album featured two entirely new tracks, "Rolamo" ("We are Rolling") and "Voli me" ("Love Me").

The album received mostly positive critics, including favorable reviews in the Croatian Jutarnji list, Večernji list, Vjesnik, and Serbian Vreme and Popboks. In the Popboks album review, the critic Goran Tarlać said "Goribor is one of the best rock albums in the last 15-20 years and the greatest individual creative peak of Serbian culture in the 21st century". The Jutarnji list journalist Aleksandar Dragaš called the album "The peak of the post-YU rock". During the early 2008, the album Goribor was pronounced as the best domestic album of the year 2007 according to the critics of Popboks and the various artists compilation Jutro će promeniti sve? appeared on the second place in the same category. Goribor was also pronounced the rock album of the year 2007 in the Serbian newspaper Blic, and the second best album in Jutarnji list

After the album release, during the same month, with the new drummer Marco Quarantotto, who had played with such acts as Dusty Miller, East Rodeo and Roy Pacithe, the band started a live promotion of the album at the Belgrade SKC, with guest appearances by the Jarboli guitarist and vocalist Danijel Kovač, former Plejboj and Eyesburn member Dušan Petrović and DJ Beatanga. In December, without Quarantotto and with Petrović on guest saxophone, the band had an unplugged performance at the Akademija bookstore as a press-only album promotion, and the day after they performed in Zrenjanin. The following year, the band toured Croatia, having solo concerts in Zagreb, Varaždin, Pula and Velika Gorica, Serbia, with the Bor concert and Slovenia, performing in Tolmin. They also made several festival performances: the Rijeka Hartera festival in May, the July performance at the Novi Sad Exit festival, featuring guest appearance by Dušan Petrović, where they performed a new song "Gradovi se lome" ("Cities are Breaking Up"), and the Belgrade Beer Fest in August of the same year.

In 2009, the band not only continued promoting the eponymous album but also started preparing the material for the upcoming studio album once again to be released by Dancing Bear, as the band had made a contract to release three studio albums through the label. In April, they had a mini-tour of Serbia, performing in Niš, Novi Sad and Belgrade. The performances did not feature the drummer Quarantotto and guitarist Marković who had left the band respectively, and the band included the new drummer Miloš Vojvodić "Miša", from the Niš experimental jazz group EYOT, on the former two performances. The Belgrade performance, also featuring a projection of the documentary about Zdenko Franjić entitled Oči u magli (Eyes in the Fog), featured Stojković and Ljubić with a guest appearance by Luka Papić "mangulicaFM" on lap-top, focusing mainly on the material from the upcoming studio album, including the songs "Ljubavi moja" ("My Love"), "Svi ti ljudi" ("All Those People") and "Grad" ("The Town").

The new lineup performed at the Zagreb Purgeraj on June 16 and the entire performance had been released on the Purgeraj DVD through Slušaj Najglasnije! during the following year. During the late 2009, the band was joined by Miroslav Užarević (guitar, bass guitar) with whom Goribor resumed their concert activities, promoting new songs from the upcoming album, including "Vožnjica" ("A Little Ride"), Moje misli" ("My Thoughts"), "Uzalud se budiš" ("You Waking Up in Vain"). The following year, Stojković released the poetry book Ne možeš mnogo ali možeš malo (You Cannot Do a Lot But You Can Do a Little), featuring the material from the 2003 Svet je moj ali ima vremena and the 2008 Princ Bez Horsa (A Prince without Horse) book, combined with new poems, published by Rende. The band had also held their first performances outside the former Yugoslavia territory, in Sweden and Norway. The band continued touring, performing at major festivals in 2010: in April at the Zagreb Žedno Uho festival, in July they performed at the Baćin 7 Jezera, in August at the Belgrade Adrenalin Music & Tattoo Live, as well as at the Niš Nisomnia festival.

In February 2011, the webzine Popboks critics selected the best Serbian albums released in the previous decade and the album Goribor appeared on the first place, and the various artists compilation Jutro će promeniti sve appeared on the sixteenth place. On May 31, the band released the single "Uzalud se budiš" ("You Are Waking Up In Vain") from the upcoming studio album, featuring the guest appearance by Nenad Sinkauz from the Croatian/Italian art rock band East Rodeo on backing vocals, available for online streaming via SoundCloud.

In May 2012, the band released the double album Evo je banja (a word play, as Evo je banja means Here's Spa, and Evo jebanja means Here's Fucking), produced by Edi Cukerić and released through Dancing Bear. On June 30, 2012, the band performed on the last evening of the first Belgrade Calling festival.

In September 2013, Goribor released the single "Jureći ljubav" ("Chasing Love"). In August 2014, the band released the single "Dugo nisam bio tu" ("I Haven't Been Around for a Long Time"). The video for the song featured actor Filip Gajić.

== Legacy ==
The lyrics of 3 songs by the band were featured in Petar Janjatović's book Pesme bratstva, detinjstva & potomstva: Antologija ex YU rok poezije 1967 - 2007 (Songs of Brotherhood, Childhood & Offspring: Anthology of Ex YU Rock Poetry 1967 - 2007).

== Discography ==
=== Official demo recordings ===
- Ono što te ne ubije, to te osakati (2004)
- Stari radovi (2005)
- Krug u očima (2005)
- Hoću kući (2005)
- Stondom do Tokija (2006)

=== Official bootleg albums ===
- Live (2005)
- Live u KSET-u (2.10.2006.) (2007)

=== Studio albums ===
- Goribor (2007)
- Evo je banja (2012)

=== Singles ===
- "Sjajne niti" (2007)
- "Uzalud se budiš" (2011)
- "Kiša" (2012)

=== Other appearances ===
- Bombardiranje New Yorka vol.10 (2003)
- Jutro će promeniti sve? (2007)
- Rhythm changes (2007)
