= As the Dark Wave Swells =

As The Dark Wave Swells

Studio album by The Bambi Molesters
- Released: 2010
- Genre: Surf rock, instrumental rock
- Label: Dancing Bear
- Producer: Chris Eckman

The Bambi Molesters chronology
Dumb Loud Hollow Twang Deluxe (2003)	As The Dark Wave Swells (2010)

As The Dark Wave Swells (2010) is the fifth and last album by Croatian surf-rock band The Bambi Molesters, who disbanded in 2018. The producer/string arranger was Chris Eckman, formerly of The Walkabouts who lived in Slovenia.

== Track listing ==
No.	Title	Writer(s)	Length
1.	"As The Dark Wave Swells"	D. Pavičić	4:33
2.	"The Kiss-Off"	D. Pavičić	3:38
3.	"Wrong Turn"	Tomljanović / Zaborac / Furlan-Zaborac	3:13
4.	"Point Of No Return"	D. Pavičić	3:57
5.	"Into The Crimson Sunset"	D. Pavičić / D. Tomljanović	3:14
6.	"Panic Party"	D. Pavičić / D. Tomljanović	3:09
7.	"Lazy Girls Hangout"	D. Pavičić	4:19
8.	"Siboney"	E. Lecuona	3:19
9.	"Mindbender"	D. Pavičić	2:25
10.	"Thunderin' Guitar"	J. Knettel	1:39
11.	"Rising East"	Tomljanović / Zaborac / Furlan-Zaborac	4:27

== Personnel ==
- Dalibor Pavičić - guitar, baritone guitar
- Dinko Tomljanović - acoustic guitar
- Lada Furlan Zaborac - bass, piano, organ
- Hrvoje Zaborac - drums

== Charts ==
Chart performance for As the Dark Wave Swells
Chart (2021)	Peak position
Croatian Domestic Albums (HDU)	1

== Sources ==
- The Bambi Molesters - As the Dark Wave Swells (in Croatian)
