= Branko Črnac Tusta =

Branko Črnac

Background information
- Also known as: Tusta
- Born: 6 October 1955; Pula, PR Croatia, FPR Yugoslavia
- Died: 14 October 2012 (aged 57) Pula, Croatia
- Genres: Punk rock; alternative rock
- Occupations: Singer, songwriter
- Instrument: Vocals
- Years active: 1985–2011
- Labels: DID Slovenija; Incognito Records; Helidon; Bonaca; Primitivc; Veruda Singles; Dancing Bear; Menart Records
- Formerly of: KUD Idijoti

Branko Črnac "Tusta" (6 October 1955 – 14 October 2012) was a Croatian and Yugoslav musician, best known as the frontman of the popular punk rock band KUD Idijoti. Noted for his charisma, stage persona and anti-fascist stands, Črnac was one of the most prominent figures of the Yugoslav punk rock scene.

== Biography ==
=== Early life ===
Črnac was born on 6 October 1955 in Pula, in a family originating from a village on the Ćićarija hill. He graduated from Pula Technical School, and in 1978 got an employment in Uljanik Electric Machines and Equipment Factory (TESU), where he eventually became a head of a department; he was a trade-union representative for the Trade Unions of Istria, Kvarner and Dalmatia, and he actively organized and participated in workers' protests.

=== Musical career ===
Črnac joined KUD Idijoti in 1985, four years after the band's formation. At the time, Črnac was 30 years old, married and had a child, working in Uljanik factory and had no previous experience in performing. The best-known lineup of the band, consisting of Črnac, guitarst Saša Milovanović "Sale Veruda", bass guitarist Nenad Marjanović "Fric" and drummer Diego Bosusco "Ptica", gained the attention of Yugoslav and foreign public with their energetic live performances and their EPs and live albums released through independent record labels. By the time they released their first studio album, the 1990 Mi smo ovdje samo zbog para (We're Here Only for the Money), the band had already enjoyed a cult following in Yugoslavia. Although the Yugoslav Wars made a gap in their career, the group soon returned to the scene, and throughout 1990s and 2000s maintained large fanbase in all former Yugoslav republics. With KUD Idijoti, Črnac recorded seven studio albums, three live albums, four EPs and a video album.

=== Illness and death ===
At the beginning of 2011, Črnac was diagnosed with lung and throat cancer. He had his last performance with the band on 26 February 2011 in Zeleni Gaj in Slovenia. During the following months, the band performed as a trio with Milovanović on vocals, and in May 2011 went on an indefinite hiatus. Črnac died on 14 October 2012, and was buried at the City cemetery in Pula. Several days following his death, Milovanović announced that KUD Idijoti have ceased to exist.

== Honors and legacy ==
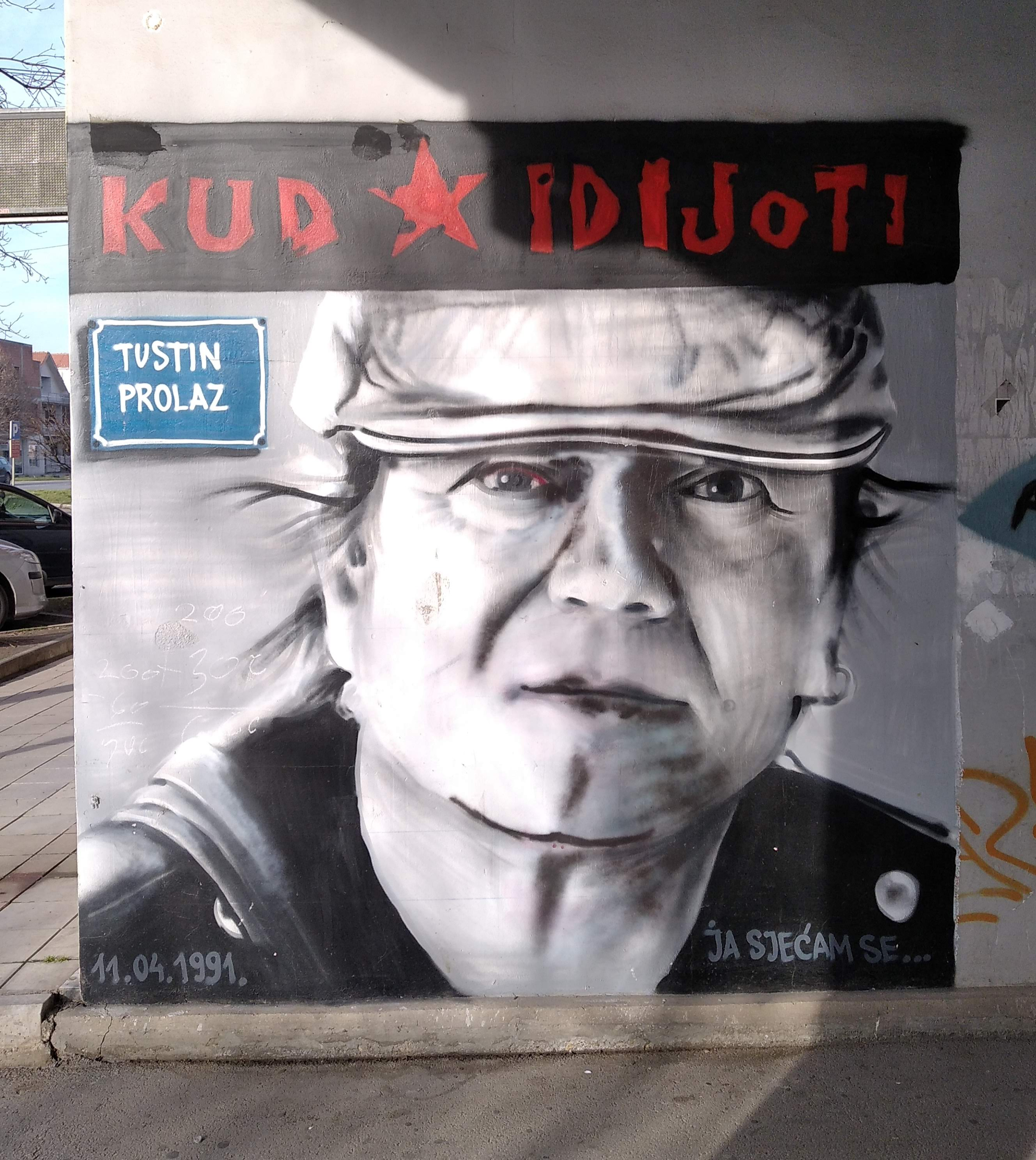
A street mural dedicated to Črnac in Stara Pazova, Serbia, created in 2019. The mural was vandalized in November 2021, but was cleaned on the same day.

Following Črnac's death, the outdoor staircase leading to the Uljanik club in Pula was officially named Stairs of Branko Črnac "Tusta." In 2019, a documentary about Črnac, directed by Andrej Korovljev and entitled Tusta, premiered on Motovun Film Festival.

In 2015, KUD Idijoti album Mi smo ovdje samo zbog para was polled No.64 on the list of 100 Greatest Yugoslav Albums published by the Croatian edition of Rolling Stone. In 2020, the band was awarded the Rock&Off Lifetime Achievement Award.

== Discography ==
=== With KUD Idijoti ===
==== Studio albums ====
- Mi smo ovdje samo zbog para (1990)
- Glupost je neuništiva (1992)
- Tako je govorio Zaratusta (1993)
- Istra ti materina (With Franci Blašković; 1995)
- Megapunk (1995)
- Cijena ponosa (1997)
- Remek-djelo (2001)

==== Live albums ====
- Legendarni u živo (1986)
- Live in Biel (1988)
- Gratis Hits Live! (1999)

==== EPs ====
- Bolje izdati ploču nego prijatelja (1987)
- ...Budimo solidarni – s bogatima... (1987)
- Hoćemo cenzuru (1988)
- Fuck (1996)

==== Compilation albums ====
- Bolivia R'n'R (1989)
- Singles Collection Vol. 1 (1997)

==== Video albums ====
- Đuro Was Sold Out! (1991)
