= Goribor (album) =

Studio album by Goribor
- Released: 9 November 2007
- Recorded: 2007
- Studio: Partyzan studio (Pula), DB studio (Zagreb), Metro Studio (Ljubljana)
- Genre: Alternative rock, indie rock, blues rock, post-punk revival, trip hop, electronic music, experimental music
- Length: 74:16
- Label: Dancing Bear; Automatik Records
- Producer: Edi Cukerić, Goribor

Goribor chronology
Stondom do Tokija (2006)	Goribor (2007)

Professional ratings
Review scores
Source	Rating
Popboks	link
Terapija	10/10 stars
Mladina.si	link
Muzika.hr	link
Groupie.hr	(favorable)
DOPMagazin	(favorable) link

Goribor is the eponymous debut album by the Serbian alternative rock band Goribor, released in 2007 by Dancing Bear in Croatia and Automatik Records in Serbia.

== Track listing ==
All lyrics written by Aleksandar Stojković "St". All music written by Aleksandar Stojković "St", except tracks 5 and 12, written by Željko Ljubić "Pity", and tracks 6, 9 and 11, written by Predrag Marković "Peđa".

No.	Title	Length
1.	"Sjajne niti" (Glowing Threads)	4:03
2.	"Hoću da živim" (I Want To Live)	3:21
3.	"Dalajlama me se sećaš" (Dolailama You Remember Me)	7:23
4.	"Ko sam?" (Who am I?)	4:56
5.	"Bez" (Without)	4:11
6.	"Nije da nije" (Not That It Is Not)	5:25
7.	"St. Bluz" (St. Blues)	5:11
8.	"Rolamo" (We are Rolling)	5:59
9.	"Vreme" (Time)	4:22
10.	"Bas Cunami" (Bass Tsunami)	4:02
11.	"Ne" (No)	4:05
12.	"Voli me" (Love Me)	4:27
13.	"Glupo" (Stupid)	6:11
14.	"Mislim" (I Think)	9:34
15.	"Blatnjavi puti" (Muddy Roads)	0:13

== Personnel ==
Goribor

- Aleksandar Stojković "St" — vocals
- Željko Ljubić "Pity" — guitar
- Predrag Marković "Peđa" — guitar
- Milan Stošić "Žaba" — samples and effects

Additional personnel

- Edi Cukerić — producer
- Ivo Lorencin — mixed by, engineer, programmed by, sampler
- Mladen Malek — mixed by, engineer, programmed by, sampler
- Davor Milovan "Bili" — bass on tracks 1, 2, 3 and 12
- Marco Quarantotto — drums on tracks 1 and 12
- Zoran Angeleski "Šizo" — drums on tracks 1 and 12
- Leon Brenko — keyboards on tracks 2, 4, 5, 6 and 11
- Saša Petković "Sale" — drums on track 11
- Bonzo — banjo on track 7
- Mirko Kusačić — guitar on track 8
- Predrag Ljuna — harmonica on tracks 8 and 11
- Morin Kudić — vocals on track 11
- Alen Rosanda "Ros" — guitar on track 14
