= Sonic Bullets: 13 from the Hip =

Sonic Bullets: 13 From the Hip

Studio album by The Bambi Molesters
- Released: 2001
- Recorded: RSL Studio, Novo Mesto; various locations in Seattle, August, October 2001
- Genre: Surf rock, instrumental rock, spy music
- Length: 43:49
- Label: Dancing Bear
- Producer: Edi Cukerić

The Bambi Molesters chronology
Intensity! (1999)	Sonic Bullets: 13 From the Hip (2001)	Dumb Loud Hollow Twang Deluxe (2003)

Professional ratings
Review scores
Source	Rating
Pitchfork Media	7.9/10 link

Sonic Bullets: 13 From the Hip is the third studio album released by Croatian surf rock band The Bambi Molesters. The album was recorded in Novo Mesto, Slovenia, and various locations in Seattle. It features numerous guest musicians, including Scott McCaughey of Young Fresh Fellows and The Minus 5, Peter Buck of R.E.M. and The Minus 5, Chris Eckman of The Walkabouts, Terry Lee Hale, and Jorge Eduardo "Speedy" Martinez of The Flaming Sideburns.

== Background ==
Following the success of their second album, Intensity!, the Bambi Molesters recruited musicians they had performed with in the previous years to perform on their third album. The band had opened for R.E.M. in 1999, and guitarist Peter Buck had offered to play guitar on any future recordings by the band. Buck contributed guitar to "Theme From Slaying Beauty" and "Chaotica". Scott McCaughey, who was working with Buck in The Minus 5, plays piano, organ, vibraphone, bells, and harmonica on various tracks. Chris Eckman of The Walkabouts sings on "Ice and Pinewood Trees" alongside bassist Lada Furlan, while The Flaming Sideburns' Jorge Eduardo "Speedy" Martinez provides spoken Spanish vocals on "Corazón del Loco Jorge".

Music videos for "Theme From Slaying Beauty", "Ice and Pinewood Trees", and "Chaotica" were released to promote the album, and "Chaotica" was featured in an episode of Breaking Bad. The song "Malagueña" was used for the opening and closing credits of the Spanish series "Arde Madrid".

== Track listing ==
All tracks are written by Dalibor Pavičić, except where noted

No.	Title	Writer(s)	Length
1.	"Theme From Slaying Beauty"		3:52
2.	"Malagueña"	Ernesto Lecuona	2:58
3.	"Corazón Del Loco Jorge"		4:37
4.	"Ice and Pinewood Trees"	Dalibor Pavičić, Dinko Tomljanović	3:10
5.	"Last Ride"		3:12
6.	"Bubble Bath"		2:05
7.	"Bombora"	Larry Weed	2:06
8.	"Tremble and Shake"	Dalibor Pavičić, Art Bourasseau	2:39
9.	"Baia"	Ary Barroso	2:59
10.	"Farewell Malasaña"		4:52
11.	"Final Wave For The Day"		2:25
12.	"Double Danger"		3:40
13.	"Chaotica"		5:13

== Personnel ==
- Dalibor Pavičić - Guitar
- Dinko Tomljanović - Guitar, theremin
- Lada Furlan - Bass, vocal (4)
- Hrvoje Zaborac - Drums
- Peter Buck - Guitar (1,13), fuzz bass (3)
- Scott McCaughey - Organ (1,3,9,10), vibraphone (1,13), piano (3,4,13), tubular bells (4), bass harmonica (3)
- Chris Eckman - Acoustic guitar (5), vocal (4)
- Terry Lee Hale - Whistle & u-cha (5)
- Jorge Eduardo "Speedo" Martinez - Voice (spoken words in Spanish) (3)
- Borna Sercer - Percussion
- Boris Mohoric - Trumpet (2)
- Tomo - Guitar (6)
