= Srbija do Tokija =

Serbian football slogan

- Србија до Токија
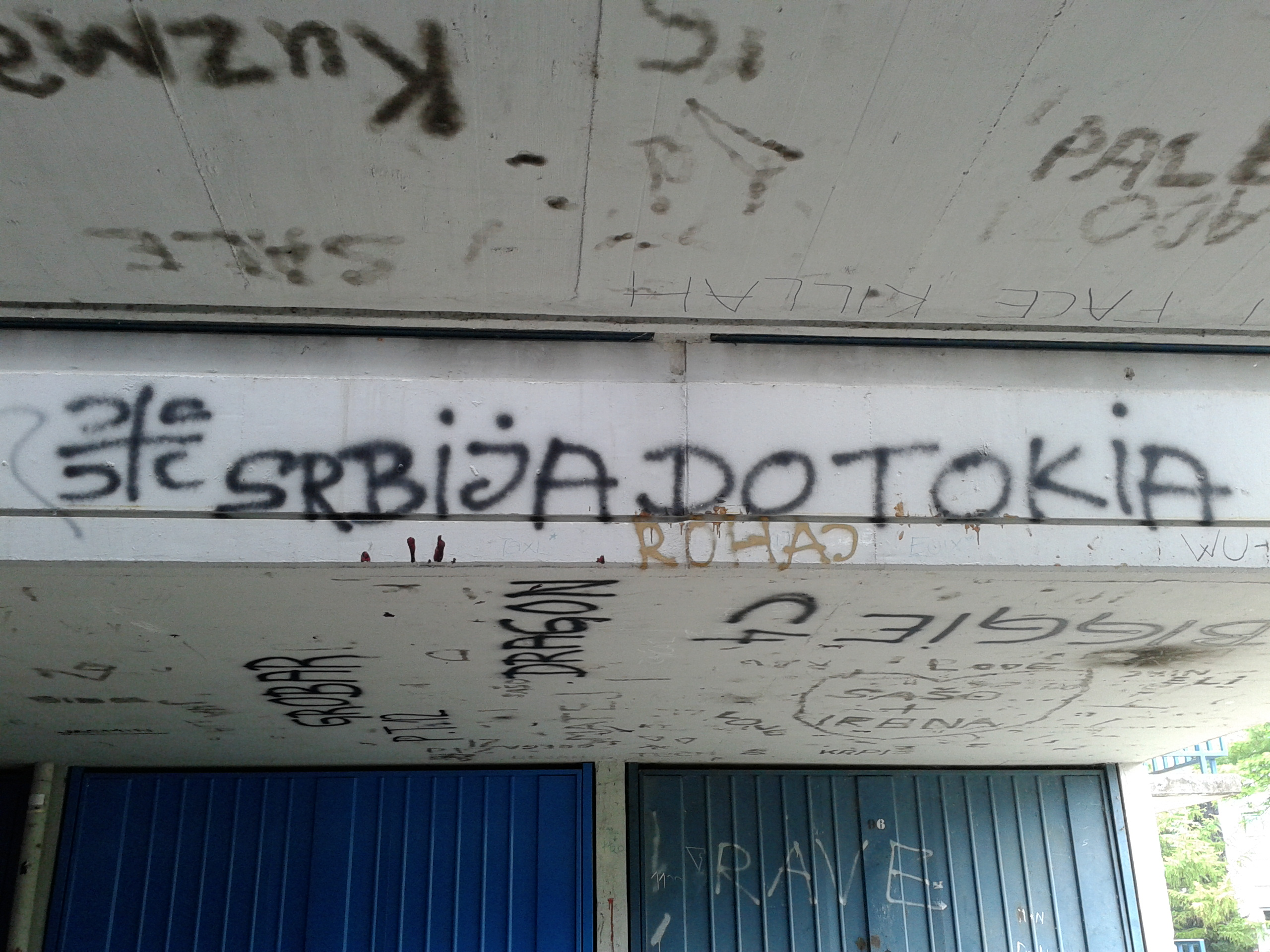
- Srbija do Tokia [sic] graffiti, alongside the Serbian cross, in Ljubljana, Slovenia
- Type: Graffiti
- Writing: Gaj's Latin
- Created: 1991 Intercontinental Cup
- Culture: Serbian; Serbian football

Srbija do Tokija (Serbian Cyrillic: Србија до Токија), meaning "Serbia to Tokyo", is a slogan and catchphrase dating back to the early 1990s. In 1991, Serbian (then-Yugoslav) football club Red Star Belgrade won the European Cup and the Intercontinental Cup in Tokyo, Japan. This was the greatest success of any football club ever in Yugoslavia, and was much envied by the other nations at the time of increased ethnic tensions. The phrase has been used by Serbian football fans to taunt fans from rival ethnic groups in the beginning of the Yugoslav Wars of the 1990s.

The phrase is evoked by both Serbian nationalists, and Serbs jokingly mocking Serb exceptionalism alike.

== Origin of the phrase ==
On 29 May 1991, as inter-ethnic relations in Yugoslavia were growing tenser, Red Star defeated French team Olympique de Marseille to win the European Cup – the first Yugoslav team to do so, and the second Eastern European. As the winners of the European Cup, Red Star Belgrade earned a place in the Intercontinental Cup, which was held at the Tokyo National Stadium. Exultant fans coined the phrase to glorify their team's upcoming adventure.

On 8 December 1991, Red Star won the Intercontinental Cup, defeating Chilean team Colo-Colo. By that time, the tension that had underlain the European Cup match had ignited into the Yugoslav Wars, with a short-lived war in Slovenia, and a full-scale war in Croatia. In this context, the phrase's associations with Serbian victory made it particularly appealing to nationalists and militarists.

== Occurrences ==
Graffiti containing the message are present in Serbia, as well in Republika Srpska and other parts of Bosnia and Herzegovina. Such graffiti was also seen in Kosovo during the Kosovo War. In the Kosovo village of Lozica in the Mališevo municipality, the local Albanian population was claiming that the graffiti "Srbija do Tokija" was written by Serbian military forces during the destruction of the village.

During the NATO bombing of Yugoslavia, the phrase was expanded. "Srbija do Tokija, al' preko Milvokija", meaning "Serbia to Tokyo, but over Milwaukee", in order to show disagreement with United States' role during the bombing. After the bombing ended, phrase extension was abandoned.

== References in popular culture ==
- Serbian alternative rock band Goribor released a demo album Stondom do Tokija (Stoned to Tokyo) as a parody for the slogan.
- The 1996 Serbian film Pretty Village, Pretty Flame, directed by Srđan Dragojević, featured the phrase on a wall next to the Serbian three-finger salute.
