= Play Out of Tune =

Play Out Of Tune

EP by The Bambi Molesters
- Released: April 1995
- Genre: Garage rock revival
- Length: 29:00
- Label: Slušaj najglasnije!
- Producer: The Bambi Molesters

The Bambi Molesters chronology
Play Out Of Tune (1995)	Dumb Loud Hollow Twang (1997)

The Bambi Molesters Play Out Of Tune is the debut EP disc of Croatian rock band The Bambi Molesters. This early recordings differentiate from the band's later ones. The record has cheap production and it sounds more like 60's garage punk than surf rock. The disc contents only 2 instrumentals and 9 songs with vocals, including a cover-version of Pere Ubu song. It was recorded and released on cassette in 1995, while the Croatian War of Independence was still ongoing.

== Track listing ==
All tracks are written by Pavičić/Tomljanović except where noted

No.	Title	Writer(s)	Length
1.	"Wanganui"		1:49
2.	"She's So Soft Inside"		2:34
3.	"1000 Songs"		2:58
4.	"Idle Moments"		2:25
5.	"Her Delta's Blues"		1:57
6.	"Good Times"	Nobody's Children	2:47
7.	"Catatonya"		3:55
8.	"Little Beach Bunny"	Usher/Christian	2:10
9.	"Cradle Snatcher"		3:32
10.	"I Can't Believe It"	Pere Ubu	2:05
11.	"Charlie Brown Manson"		3:18

== Personnel ==
- Dalibor Pavičić - Vocals, guitar
- Dinko Tomljanović - Guitar
- Lada Furlan - Bass
- Hrvoje Zaborac - Drums
