= The Dolly Rocker Movement =

Australian rock music group

- Origin: Sydney, New South Wales, Australia
- Genre: Neo-psychedelia
- Years active: 2002–2013
- Label: Off the Hip
- Past members: Ricky Drabsch; Daniel Poulter; Christopher Rudge; Martin Walters; Jules Ferrari; Claire Yvonne Evans; T.J. McDonnell; Emily Stoia; Jimmy Sweet

The Dolly Rocker Movement were an Australian neo-psychedelic rock band, formed in 2002 by singer and guitarist, Daniel Poulter, the Australian line-up included, Ricky Drabsch (bass), Martin Walters (keyboards) and Christopher Rudge (drums). They released three full-length albums, Electric Sunshine (10 July 2006), A Purple Journey Through the Mod Machine (16 March 2007) and Our Days Mind the Tyme (2009), through independent Australian record label Off the Hip before disbanding in 2013.

== History ==
The Dolly Rocker Movement were formed in 2002 in Sydney by Ricky Drabsch on bass guitar, Daniel Poulter on lead vocals and guitar, Christopher Rudge on drums and Martin Walters on keyboards.

The group has played with such acts as The Black Keys, Lime Spiders, The Stems and The Lovetones. The band has had material showcased outside of Australia on various releases, including Northern Star Records' three Psychedelica compilations, and the Greek Peace Frog and Lost in Tyme zines. In 2009 Denmark-based label Bad Afro announced it would release their third album, Our Days Mind the Tyme, in all non-Australian territories.

BMA Magazine's Cat Woods described Our Days Mind the Tyme as, "a flawlessly produced invitation to psychedelic '60s revival. Sunshine, electric pop, garage pop." She found the group difficult to categorise, "Just when I think I've pinned down their sound, they go on a wild trip into other eras, other lands, and the only thing that I'm assured of is that it will be awesomely fun."

Stephen Haag of PopMatters observed, "There's more to this stuff than just a Hammond organ and a fuzzbox. DRM has done its homework, and even mix things up with some surf/horror-garage vibes." Fausto Turi of Freakout magazine opined, "the group takes the best – starting with the style of the beautiful cover image ... – the British mersey beat, and the Californian electroacoustic psychedelia, with sparkling certain retrofuturistic sounds, but adding – and that is what ultimately matters most – a good quality of musical writing. Rich psychedelic blooms of a hundred colors and a thousand shades, come to light with the support of that miraculous instrument that is the farfisa piano, present in every song."

In late 2009 Poulter travelled to Los Angeles to start demo recording new solo and band material with producer Rob Campanella. There, the band was reformed to include de Silver, Jimmy Sweet (formerly bassist of Hot Hot Heat), Emily Stoia (keyboards), and T.J. McDonnell (drums). The outfit disbanded in 2013.

Poulter, named as Daniel Darling, led Kill City Creeps. By April 2015, he began the Dandelion, a four-piece band, "who weave retro nostalgia with swirling, driving psych rock and pop."

== Discography ==
- 2006 - Electric Sunshine (LP)
- 2007 - A Purple Journey Through the Mod Machine (LP)
- 2009 - A Sound for Two (EP)
- 2009 - "Our Brave New World" / "Mystery Man" (7-inch single)
- 2009 - Our Days Mind the Tyme (LP)
- 2013 - "Your Side of Town" (single)
