= Dumb Loud Hollow Twang Deluxe =

Studio album by The Bambi Molesters
- Released: 2003
- Recorded: September 2003
- Genre: Surf rock, instrumental rock
- Label: Dancing Bear
- Producer: Davor Rocco and The Bambi Molesters

The Bambi Molesters chronology
Sonic Bullets: 13 From The Hip (2001)	Dumb Loud Hollow Twang Deluxe (2003)	As The Dark Wave Swells (2010)

Dumb Loud Hollow Twang Deluxe is The Bambi Molesters fourth studio album. It's the 2003 remake of their Dumb Loud Hollow Twang debut album (1997) in hi-fi sound quality with guest vocal appearance of Chris Eckman.

== Track listing ==
All tracks are written by Dalibor Pavičić / Dinko Tomljanović except where noted.

No.	Title	Writer(s)	Length
1.	"Wanganui"		2:03
2.	"Hot Water Pool"		1:44
3.	"Restless"	Teddy Wadmore / Johnny Kidd	2:38
4.	"Pearl Divin'"		4:09
5.	"Point Break"		4:20
6.	"The Breeze and I"	Ernesto Lecuona	3:33
7.	"Margaya"	Randy Holden	2:30
8.	"Big Time Action"		2:21
9.	"Beach Murder Mystery"		2:18
10.	"Sunstroke"		3:13
11.	"Catatonya"		3:45
12.	"Standing on the Nose in a Stylish Manner"		2:00
13.	"Coastal Disturbance"		2:04
14.	"Long Gun"		2:27
15.	"Hawaii Joe"		2:02
16.	"Tremor"		2:44
17.	"Landlocked"		2:59
18.	"Cecilia Ann"	Charles Horton, Steve Hoffman	2:13
19.	"Glider"		3:11

== Personnel ==
- Dalibor Pavičić - Guitar
- Dinko Tomljanović - Guitar
- Lada Furlan-Zaborac - Bass
- Hrvoje Zaborac - Drums

== Charts ==
Chart performance for Dumb Loud Hollow Twang Deluxe
Chart (2021)	Peak position
Croatian Domestic Albums (HDU)	1
