= Dumb Loud Hollow Twang =

Studio album by The Bambi Molesters
- Released: 1997
- Recorded: 30 March 1997
- Genre: Surf rock, instrumental rock
- Length: 39:40
- Label: Dirty Old Town
- Producer: Phil Dirt

The Bambi Molesters chronology
| Play Out of Tune (EP) (1995) | Dumb Loud Hollow Twang (1997) | Intensity! (1999) |

Dumb Loud Hollow Twang is the first studio album released by Croatian surf rock band The Bambi Molesters. The album was recorded in March 1997 and was released later that year. The band felt dissatisfied with the final result of the album, and in 2003 re-recorded them for their fourth album, Dumb Loud Hollow Twang Deluxe.

== Background ==
Dumb Loud Hollow Twang was recorded in one marathon three-hour session on 30 March 1997. The band allegedly had to bribe a janitor in order to gain access to the recording studio. They played live, recording one take of each song. After each track had been recorded, the janitor who had been overseeing the sessions suddenly announced that he was leaving to celebrate Easter with his family. The band left the studio with their tape.

When they listened to the tape, however, they discovered that one of drummer Hrvoje Zaborac's cymbals had been picked up on every instrument's channel. In an attempt to fix the problem, the band approached a producer, but this producer left in the middle of the sessions to work on another project. The band then contacted California DJ Phil Dirt, asking for assistance. They mailed their tapes to Dirt, who in turn mixed and mastered them. The band was satisfied with the production but agreed that they could have performed each track better.

The album was released in the autumn of 1997, on the Croatian label Dirty Old Town. A promotional tour of Croatia and Slovenia followed, and a music video for "Wanganui" and "Coastal Disturbance" was released that winter. The album was licensed to German label Kamikaze in 1998, where it went out of print by the end of the year. Their dissatisfaction with the recording of Dumb Loud Hollow Twang led them to create Dumb Loud Hollow Twang Deluxe in 2003, in which they re-recorded every song on the original album and added four additional songs.

== Track listing ==
All tracks are written by Dalibor Pavičić and Dinko Tomljanović

| No. | Title | Length |
|---|---|---|
| 1. | "Wanganui" | 1:42 |
| 2. | "Long Gun" | 2:32 |
| 3. | "Hawaii Joe" | 2:04 |
| 4. | "Catatonya" | 3:42 |
| 5. | "Big Time Action" | 2:23 |
| 6. | "Point Break" | 4:01 |
| 7. | "Sun Stroke" | 2:58 |
| 8. | "Standing on the Nose in a Stylish Manner" | 1:59 |
| 9. | "Tremor" | 2:35 |
| 10. | "Glider" | 3:03 |
| 11. | "Hot Water Pool" | 1:52 |
| 12. | "Beach Murder Mystery" | 2:24 |
| 13. | "Coastal Disturbance" | 2:03 |
| 14. | "Landlocked" | 2:57 |
| 15. | "Pearl Divin'" | 3:24 |

== Personnel ==
- Dalibor Pavičić - Guitar
- Dinko Tomljanović - Guitar
- Lada Furlan Zaborac - Bass
- Hrvoje Zaborac - Drums

== Sources ==
- Dumb Loud Hollow Twang Deluxe liner notes
