= Bad Afro =

Danish independent record label

Bad Afro Records
- Founded: 1996
- Founder: Lars Krogh
- Genre: Psychedelic rock, garage rock, soul, surf rock, stoner rock
- Country of origin: Denmark
- Location: Copenhagen
- Official website: http://www.badafro.dk

Bad Afro Records is an independent record label based in Copenhagen, Denmark that was founded in 1996 by Lars Krogh.

== History ==
=== 1996-2002 ===
Bad Afro Records is an independent record label based in Copenhagen, Denmark. The label was founded in 1996 with the purpose of releasing rock’n’roll, punk, surf and garage rock from the Scandinavian countries and Finland. The name, logo and the original slogan “Pushing Scandinavian Rock to the Man!” was inspired by blaxsploitation movies from the early 1970s like Superfly, Foxy Brown and Dolemite.

Bad Afro Records was originally an offshoot of Moshable Magazine (1986–2000). Moshable was an underground punk and garage rock magazine that had focus on the Scandinavian music scene and featured early interviews with bands like The Hellacopters, Turbonegro, Gluecifer and The Flaming Sideburns. In the mid 1990s, the Scandinavian garage rock scene was in full bloom and bands that appeared in Moshable started to be released on vinyl on Bad Afro Records. The original idea and goal was to release 50 7” vinyl singles in 10 years to document the music scene in Scandinavia at the time. This goal was never reached – 10 years later only 45 7”singles had been released.

Bad Afro Records began as a singles club where members could sign up and receive the upcoming six vinyl 7” singles on the label. The concept was inspired by the American label Sub Pop which had started their singles club nearly a decade earlier with great success. In 1999 the first album by The Flaming Sideburns was released and although the singles club continued a few years after that the focus of the label shifted towards full album releases.

In the early years, most releases on Bad Afro Records could be described as garage rock and punk rock with a few excursions into weirder musical territories. At the time the label worked with artists such as The Hellacopters, Turbonegro, The Nomads, The Flaming Sideburns, The Burnouts, Backyard Babies, Gluecifer, Larry & the Lefthanded, The Chronics, Festermen and The Royal Beat Conspiracy as well as many other bands pretty much in the same vein.

=== 2002-2009 ===
In many ways 2001 to 2004 was the heyday of Bad Afro Records. Scandinavian rock’n’roll was praised all over the world and The Flaming Sideburns were doing very well touring all over the world and was licensed to countries like USA and Australia. In 2003 came the national breakthrough for Bad Afro Records with the release of the Baby Woodrose album “Money For Soul” that featured two major hits on National Radio and was nominated for a Danish Grammy. Baby Woodrose also did a collaboration with Danish beat legend Peter Belli that topped the charts on National Danish Radio and the band played two years in a row on the main stage at the famous Roskilde Festival.

In 2003, Bad Afro re-issued the debut album “Blows Your Mind” by Baby Woodrose which led to some controversy and discussions on freedom of speech for artists. The original artwork was done by the Italian artist collective Malleus and the most important music outlet at the time, Myspace, banned the cover and censored the artwork on several occasions. The artwork was an erotic painting that also made the German pressing plant refuse to print the LP version.

From 2003, the Bad Afro Records slowly took a bend towards psychedelic rock in the sense that most of the new bands that was signed in this period often had a psychedelic edge. Besides keeping on releasing Baby Woodrose albums it also meant collaborations with artists like On Trial, The Setting Son, Dragontears and Sarena-Maneesh.

=== 2009-2012 ===
After 13 years of "Pushing Scandinavian Rock to the Man!", as the original slogan goes, the label took another turn in 2009 and decided that it was too limiting only releasing music from Scandinavia. In came The Dolly Rocker Movement from Australia and The Mojomatics from Italy and there is releases by US bands Cosmonauts and Royal Baths on the way in 2012.

As a curiosum it can be mentioned that Bad Afro Records since the beginning as a vinyl based record label has had a policy that makes it easy to tell the difference between first print of the LP's or 7” singles and later prints. First print is on black vinyl, second print is on red vinyl, 3rd print is on green vinyl and 4th print is on purple vinyl.

== Discography ==
=== Albums ===
- The Flaming Sideburns – It's Time to Testify...Brothers and Sisters CD (AFROCD001) – 1999
- Union 69 – Holiday 2000 CD (AFROCD003) – 2000
- The Burnouts – Go Go Racing CD (AFROCD004) – 2000
- The Royal Beat Conspiracy – Gala Galore CD (AFROCD005) – 2000
- Festermen – Full Treatment CD (AFROCD006) - 2000
- The Chronics – Soulshaker CD (AFROCD009) – 2000
- The Flaming Sideburns – Hallelujah Rock’n’Rollah CD/LP (AFROCD011/AFROLP011) – 2001
- The Burnouts – Close to Breakevil CD/LP (AFROCD013/AFROLP013) – 2001
- The Chronics – Make You Move CD/LP (AFROCD014/AFROLP014) – 2001
- The Royal Beat Conspiracy – Dig It! CD/LP (AFROCD015/AFROLP015) – 2002
- Sweatmaster – Sharp Cut CD/LP (AFROCD017/AFROLP017) – 2002
- Baby Woodrose – Money For Soul CD/LP (AFROCD018/AFROLP018) – 2003
- Baby Woodrose – Blows Your Mind CD/LP (AFROCD020/AFROLP020) – 2003
- Silver – White Diary CD/LP (AFROCD019/AFROLP019) – 2004
- Baby Woodrose – Dropout CD/LP (AFROCD021/AFROLP021) – 2004
- Viva Vertigo – Viva Viva CD/LP (AFROCD023/AFROLP023) – 2004
- The Defectors – Turn Me On CD/LP (AFROCD024/AFROLP024) – 2004
- Sweatmaster – Tom Tom Bullet CD/LP (AFROCD025/AFROLP025) – 2005
- Slideshaker – In the Raw CD/LP (AFROCD026/AFROLP026) – 2005
- On Trial – Forever CD/LP (AFROCD027/AFROLP027) - 2006
- The Flaming Sideburns – Back to the Grave CD/LP (AFROCD028/AFROLP028) – 2006
- Silver – World Against World CD (AFROCD033) – 2006
- The Defectors – Bruised and Satisfied CD/LP (AFROCD029/AFROLP029) CD – 2007
- Dragontears – 2000 Micrograms From Home CD/LP (AFROCD032/AFROLP032) – 2007
- The Setting Son – s/t CD/LP (AFROCD034/AFROLP034) – 2007
- Baby Woodrose – Chasing Rainbows CD/LP (AFROCD035/AFROLP035) – 2007
- Dragontears – Tambourine Freak Machine CD/LP (AFROCD037/AFROLP037) – 2008
- The Setting Son – Spring of Hate CD/LP (AFROCD036/AFROLP036) – 2009
- Baby Woodrose – s/t CD/LP (AFROCD038/AFROLP038) – 2009
- The Dolly Rocker Movement – Our days Mind the Tyme CD/LP (AFROCD039/AFROLP039) – 2010
- Dragontears – Turn On Tune In Fuck Off!! CD/LP (AFROCD040/AFROLP040) – 2010
- Baby Woodrose – Mindblowing Seeds & Disconnected Flowers CD/LP (AFROCD041/AFROLP041) - 2011
- Baby Woodrose - Love Comes Down CD/LP (AFROCD042/AFROLP042) – 2011
- Telstar Sound Drone - Comedown LP (AFROLP045) - 2013

=== EPs ===
- The Flaming Sideburns – It's Time to Testify...Brothers and Sisters 10” (FRO1001) – 1998
- The Royal Beat Conspiracy – Music to Rock the Nation 10” (FRO1002) – 1999
- The Royal Beat Conspiracy – Shake What You Have Got CD (AFROCD007) – 2000
- The Hellacopters/The Flaming Sideburns – Split CD/10” (AFROCD008/FRO1003) – 2001
- The Maggots – This Condition is Incurable CD/10” (AFROCD012/FRO1004) – 2002
- Sweatmaster – Song With no Words CD/12” (AFROCD022/FRO1006) – 2004
- The Defectors/Powersolo - Snot Dum Split 12" (FRO1008) - 2005
- Pistepirkko/The Others – Ou Wee! CD/12” (AFROCD031/FRO1009) – 2006

=== Compilations ===
- V/A – Pushing Scandinavian Rock to the Man! vol. 1 CD (AFROCD002) – 1999
- V/A – Pushing Scandinavian Rock to the Man! vol. 2 CD (AFROCD010) – 2001
- V/A – Pushing Scandinavian Rock to the Man! vol. 3 CD (AFROCD016) – 2002

=== Live LPs ===
- Baby Woodrose – Live at Gutter Island LP (FRO1005) – 2003
- The Defectors – Live at Gutter Island LP (FRO1007) – 2004
- On Trial – Live at Gutter Island LP (FRO1010) – 2007

=== 7" vinyl singles ===
- Trouble Bound Gospel – Shakin' Ray 7" (FRO001) – 1996
- The Hellacopters – Misanphropic High 7" (FRO002) – 1996
- Larry & The Lefthanded – Johnny The Void 7" (FRO003) – 1997
- The Nomads – Love's Gone Bad 7" (FRO004) – 1997
- Turbonegro – Suffragette City 7" (FRO005) – 1997
- Gluecifer – Dambuster 7" (FRO006) – 1997
- The Flaming Sideburns – Get Down Or Get Out 7" (FRO007) – 1997
- Submerged – Mr. Blues 7" (FRO008) – 1997
- The Royal Beat Conspiracy – It's Not Enough 7" (FRO009) – 1998
- The Grinners – Girl From Outer Space 7" (FRO010) – 1998
- The Duplo – Cold Ring of R'n’R 7" (FRO011) – 1998
- Backyard Babies – (Is It) Still Alright to Smile 7" (FRO012) – 1998
- Shake Appeal – Beer is the Way Out 7" (FRO013) – 1998
- Union 69 – Come Smell the Magic 7" (FRO014) – 1999
- The Tremolo Beer Gut – Squaresville 7" (FRO015) – 1999
- Turpentines – Showstopper 7" (FRO016) – 1999
- The Burnouts – No Erection, No Love 7" (FRO017) – 1999
- Festermen – Toelake Snakeman 7" (FRO018) – 1999
- Mother Superior – 3 track EP 7" (FRO019) –1999
- Dialtones – So Many Girls 7" (FRO020) – 2000
- Rockets – Creatures Nite Out 7" (FRO021) – 2000
- Peepshows – Genius 7" (FRO022) – 2000
- The Chronics – Fire Up 7" (FRO023) – 2000
- The Maggots – Gonna Make You Pay 7" (FRO024) – 2000
- Ricochets – Fall Down Dead 7" (FRO025) – 2001
- The Flaming Sideburns – Street Survivor 7" (FRO026) – 2001
- Thee Ultra Bimboos – PMS 666 7" (FRO027) – 2001
- Sweatmaster – Hold It 7" (FRO028) – 2001
- Cosmo Jones Beat Machine – 7" (FRO029) – 2001
- Sewergrooves – I've Got Levitation 7" (FRO030) – 2002
- On Trial – Higher 7" (FRO031) – 2002
- Baby Woodrose – Never Coming Back 7" (FRO032) – 2002
- Sweatmaster – Well Connected 7" (FRO033) – 2003
- Baby Woodrose – Disconnected 7" (FRO034) – 2003
- Silver – Evacuate 7" (FRO035) – 2004
- Peter Belli & Baby Woodrose – Nok Af Dig 7" (FRO036) – 2004
- Boomhauer – Work on a Spell 7" (FRO037) – 2004
- Ghost Rocket – Drug Freedom 7” (FRO038) – 2004
- Baby Woodrose/Sweatmaster – Split 7” (FRO039) – 2004
- Sweatmaster – Dirty Rabbit 7” (FRO040) – 2005
- Slideshaker – Bones 7” (FRO041) – 2005
- Columbian Neckties – Get It For You 7" (FRO043) – 2006
- The Flaming Sideburns – Count me Out 7” (FRO044) – 2006
- The Setting Son – In a Certain Way 7” (FRO045) – 2007
- Baby Woodrose – Coming Around Again 7” (FRO046) – 2008
- Baby Woodrose/Dollhouse – Split 7” (FRO047) – 2008
- Serena–Maneesh – Montrose 7” (FRO048) – 2009
- The Mojomatics – Don't Believe me When I'm High 7” (BARINT001) – 2009
- The Dolly Rocker Movement – Our Brand New World 7” (BARINT002) – 2009
- Radio Saigon – Another Time 7” (FRO049) – 2010
- On Trial – On Trial 2x7” (FRO050) – 2011
- Telstar Sound Drone – Mirror Pieces 7” (FRO051) – 2011

=== CD singles ===
- The Royal Beat Conspiracy – Disco Boy CDs (FROCDS001) – 2000
- The Flaming Sideburns – Loose My Soul CDs (FROCDS002) – 2001
- The Flaming Sideburns – Flowers CDs (FROCDS003) – 2002
- The Royal Beat Conspiracy – Good All Over CDs (FROCDS004) – 2002
- Baby Woodrose – Carry CDs (FROCDS005) – 2003
- Silver – Intimate Cussing CDs (FROCDS006) – 2004
- Silver – Angels Calling CDs (FROCDS008) – 2004
- Silver – Funeral Class One (FROCDS009) – 2004
- The Defectors – It's Gonna Take Some Time CDs(PROMOFRO002) – 2004
- Baby Woodrose – I Can't Explain CDs (FROCDS010) – 2004
- Viva Vertigo – Viva Viva (Edie Sedqwick) CDs (FROCDS011) – 2004
- Sweatmaster – Maggots CDs (FROCDS012) – 2005
- Sweatmaster – Dirty Rabbit CDs (FROCDS013) – 2005
- Slideshaker – Bones CDs (FROCDS014) – 2005
- Sweatmaster – Good looks, Big Deal CDs (FROCDS015) – 2006
- The Defectors – The Final Thrill CDs (FROCDS016) – 2006
