= Baby Woodrose =

Danish band

- Origin: Copenhagen, Denmark
- Genres: Psychedelic rock, garage rock
- Years active: 2001–present
- Members: Lorenzo Woodrose; Kåre Joensen; Yobo; Geronimo
- Past members: Fuzz Daddy aka. Rocco Woodrose; Moody Guru; Johan Lei-Gellett; Adam Olsson
- Website: babywoodrose.wordpress.com

Baby Woodrose is a rock band formed in Copenhagen, Denmark in 2001. They take their name from the Argyreia nervosa, a plant commonly known as Hawaiian baby woodrose, which can be used for hallucinogenic effects.

== History ==
=== Early years (2001–2002) ===
Baby Woodrose was started in 2001 by Uffe Lorenzen, later known under the alias Lorenzo Woodrose. Initially Baby Woodrose was a personal side-project for Lorenzo Woodrose, who was still drummer and songwriter in On Trial then. Lorenzo recorded Baby Woodrose's first album Blows Your Mind by himself on Pan Records (re-released by Bad Afro in 2003). Later on he decided to take the project to the next level and contacted 'The Moody Guru' (Riky Woodrose, bassist) and 'Fuzz Daddy' (Rocco Woodrose, drummer).

=== Breakthrough (2003–2004) ===
As a power trio they recorded several more albums, the first of which was Money for Soul, released on Bad Afro in 2003. The album catapulted Baby Woodrose into public recognition in Denmark, receiving considerable airplay, and 2003 became a turning point. They won the P3 Award in 2003, the main award in Denmark's largest music award show. The show was broadcast live on national television in Denmark, and during their live musical performance, they were joined on stage by Danish beat music icon Peter Belli. Following the quick success of Baby Woodrose, Lorenzo quit On Trial in 2003, after 17 years in the band. They released a live record of their performance on Gutter Island Garage Rock Festival, Live at Gutter Island later in 2003.

In 2004, Baby Woodrose played the opening show on the main stage of Roskilde Festival, Denmark's largest music festival. They closed the stage again three days later, playing the final show under the title "An Evening with Baby Woodrose". Same year they were nominated for the Danish Music Awards in 2004, which they didn't win however. They also released Dropout!, which was an album of cover songs by other artists, such as The Savages and 13th Floor Elevators in 2004.

=== Post-breakthrough (2005–2010) ===
2006 saw the release of the follow-up studio album with the band's own songs, after their breakthrough. The album Love Comes Down was released on Playground Music Scandinavia, as the only collaboration between Baby Woodrose and a larger record label (Lorenzo later bought the master tapes back, to re-release Love Comes Down on Bad Afro).

The mainstream media's interest was not as massive as earlier, but Baby Woodrose had attracted a following in the psychedelic underground, and continued to tour and release records. There were some changes in the band's lineup during the following years, and Lorenzo Woodrose lent himself to various side-projects, such as Dragontears and The Setting Son. He also played a few reunion concerts with an older side-project, Spids Nøgenhat (the Danish name for the psilocybin mushroom 'liberty cap', Psilocybe semilanceata), one of which were to spark a renewed interest for Baby Woodrose.

=== Renewed interest (2011–) ===
Lorenzo Woodrose performed with Spids Nøgenhat, an old side-project brought back to life, on Roskilde Festival 2011. The Spids Nøgenhat project was very little known, but the show at Roskilde Festival, which took place at 02:00 AM, became a big hit. The small stage was packed with audience, who kept chanting the chorus of the last song "Er vi de sidste her på jorden?" for hours after the show.

This led to a renewed interest in Baby Woodrose's music, reflected in the number of audience showing up for concerts in Copenhagen. In 2012 the album Third Eye Surgery was released, displaying a more space rock type sound from the band, which was well received among critics and fans.

Baby Woodrose released Freedom, the group's eleventh full-length, on September 16, 2016. Freedom displays a more politically outright Baby Woodrose with a powerful, distorted rock sound in the veins of Third Eye Surgery (2012). Since the album release, Baby Woodrose's live line-up has included two former members, Anders Grøn (Fuzz Daddy) on drums and Anders Skjødt (Moody Guru) on bass guitar, with Mads Saaby (Yobo) continuing on guitar alongside Lorenzo.

Baby Woodrose announced a break from live concerts from the summer 2016. Since then Lorenzo Woodrose has released a new solo album, Galmandsværk (Bad Afro, 2017) under his own name, Uffe Lorenzen, which he tours with.

== Lineup changes ==
Some years after joining, Moody Guru and Fuzz Daddy both left Baby Woodrose. Kåre Joenson replaced Moody Guru on the bass, and for some time, Johan Lei-Gellett replaced Fuzz Daddy on drums with Adam Olsson joining on guitar. Johan Lei-Gellett and Adam Olsson (both of the surf band, The Good The Bad) were later replaced by Geronimo (drums) and Yobo (guitar), resulting in the most stable lineup in later years:

- Lorenzo Woodrose: Lead guitar, lead vocals.
- Kåre Joensen: Bass, vocals.
- Yobo: Guitar, vocals.
- Geronimo: Drums.

After the 2016 release of the album Freedom old members Fuzz Daddy and Moody Guru have replaced Geronimo and Joensen in the live lineup.

== Discography ==
=== Albums ===
- Blows Your Mind! / Pan Records (CD – 2001) / Animal Records (LP – 2002) / Bad Afro (CD – 2003)
- Money for Soul / Bad Afro (CD/LP – 2003)
- Live at Gutter Island / Bad Afro (LP – 2003)
- Dropout! / Bad Afro (CD/LP – 2004)
- Love Comes Down / Playground Records (CD/LP – 2006) / Bad Afro (CD/LP – 2011)
- Chasing Rainbows / Bad Afro (CD/LP – 2007)
- Baby Woodrose / Bad Afro (CD/LP – 2009)
- Mindblowing Seeds & Disconnected Flowers / Bad Afro (LP/CD – 2011)
- Third Eye Surgery / Bad Afro (LP/CD – 2012)
- Kicking Ass and Taking Names / Bad Afro (LP/CD – 2014)
- Freedom / Bad Afro (CD/LP – 2016)

=== Singles ===
- "Never Coming Back" b/w "Flash On You" / Bad Afro (7" single – 2002)
- "Double Six" b/w "That's How Strong" / Pan Records (7" single – 2002)
- "Don't Look Back" / Ewing Records (split single with The Defectors – 2002)
- "Disconnected" b/w "Too Far Gone" / Bad Afro (7" single – 2003)
- "Carrie" b/w "Too Far Gone" / Bad Afro (CD single – 2003)
- "Nok Af Dig" b/w Det "Du Ka' Li" / Bad Afro (7" single with Peter Belli – 2004)
- "Hold It!" / Bad Afro (split single with Sweatmaster – 2004)
- "No Other Girl" b/w "Live Wire" / Playground Records (7" single – 2006)
- "I'm Gonna Make You Mine" b/w "Information Overload" / Crusher Records (7" single – 2008)
- "Let Yourself Go" b/w "A Good Day to Die" / Longfellowdeeds (7" single – 2008)
- "Here Today Gone Tomorrow" / Bad Afro (split single with Dollhouse – 2008)
- "Coming Around Again" b/w "I Feel High" / Bad Afro (7" single – 2008)
- "No Mas" b/w "Making My Time" / Sound Effect Records (7" single – 2009)
- "Countdown to Breakdown" b/w "Long Way Down" / Fat People Records (7" single - 2010)
- "Take It" b/w "I Need" / Get Hip (7" single – 2011)

== Sources ==
This article is partially translated from the Spanish Wikipedia article of December 23, 2009
