= The Bambi Molesters =

Croatian surf rock band

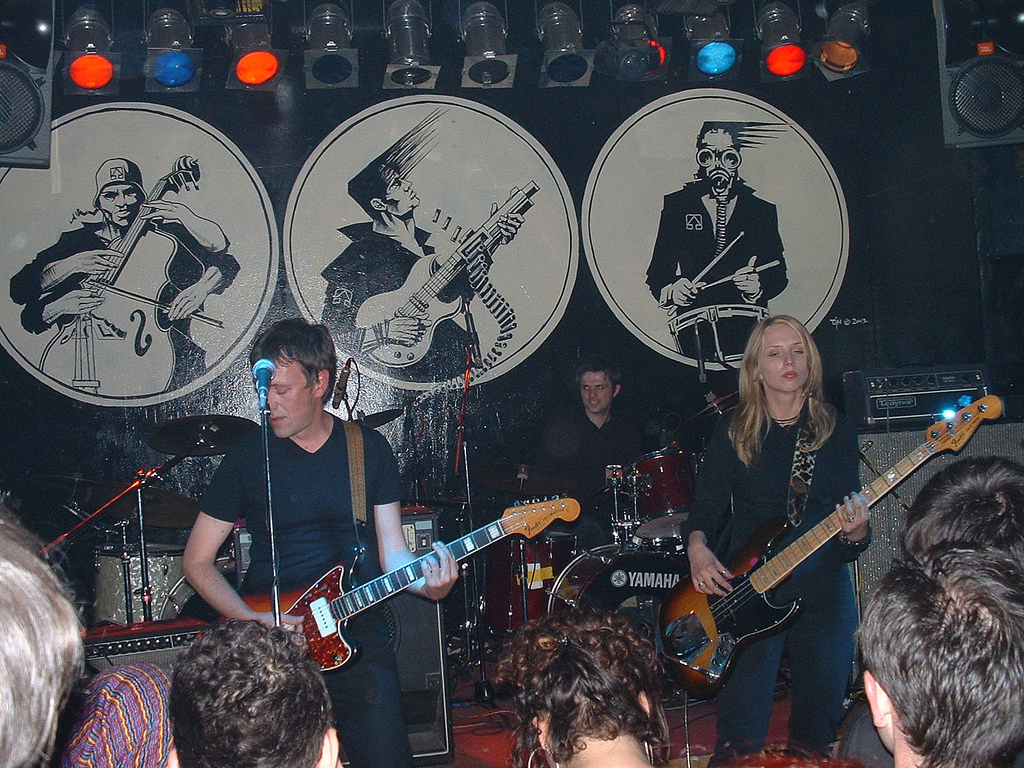
- The Bambi Molesters performing in 2001

Background information
- Origin: Sisak, Croatia
- Genres: Surf rock, instrumental rock
- Years active: 1995–2018
- Labels: Slušaj Najglasnije!, Dancing Bear, Glitterhouse Records, Kamikaze Records
- Members: Dalibor Pavičić; Dinko Tomljanović; Hrvoje Zaborac; Ladislava Furlan
- Website: thebambimolesters.com

The Bambi Molesters were a surf rock band from Sisak, Croatia, founded in 1995. They performed regularly in Croatia and all over Europe, often opening for the US rock band R.E.M. They released five studio albums from 1997 until 2013. In collaboration with Chris Eckman, leader of the gothic-americana band The Walkabouts, the project "The Strange" was born. In 2018, after 23 years, they announced on Facebook that they would disband 'It's time for a new era' but did not reveal any reasons.

== Band members ==
- Lada Furlan Zaborac - bass guitar
- Hrvoje Zaborac - drums
- Dalibor Pavičić - guitar
- Dinko Tomljanović - guitar

== Discography ==
=== Singles and EPs ===
- Play Out of Tune (Cassette), 1995
- Coastal Disturbance (7-inch EP), 1996
- Bikini Machines (7-inch), 1998

=== Studio albums ===
- Dumb Loud Hollow Twang (Dirty Old Town/Kamikaze Records, 1997/1998)
- Intensity! (Dancing Bear/Kamikaze Records, 1999)
- Sonic Bullets: 13 From The Hip (Dancing Bear, 2001)
- Dumb Loud Hollow Twang Deluxe (Dancing Bear, 2003)
- As The Dark Wave Swells (Dancing Bear, 2010)

=== Appearances on compilations ===
- Smells Like Surf Spirit, 1997
- Rolling Stone - Rare Trax, Vol. 5 Summer In The City, 1998
- Feathers, Wood & Aluminium, 1998
- Tuberider, 1999
- Monster Party 2000, 2000
- For A Few Guitars More, 2002
- Guitar Ace: Link Wray Tribute, 2003
- Bang Bang Soundtrack, 2006
- Projekt R.E.M.: Pure Energy Music , 2012

== In popular culture ==
The track "Malaguena" (from their third album Sonic Bullets: 13 from the Hip) was featured in the soundtrack of the 2018 Spanish period comedy-drama Arde Madrid, session 1 "Poco católica".

The track "Chaotica" (from their third album Sonic Bullets: 13 from the Hip) was featured in the soundtrack of Season 5 of the TV series Breaking Bad.
