= The Flaming Sideburns =

Finnish band

The Flaming Sideburns are a garage punk/garage rock revival band that was formed in Helsinki, Finland in 1995. Most of the members are Finnish, but lead vocalist Jorge Eduardo "Speedo" Martinez is an Argentine expatriate.

== Band history ==
The Flaming Sideburns released their first single Close to Disaster in 1997 and soon signed to Danish label Bad Afro who released a compilation It's Time to Testify in 1999 and debut album Hallelujah Rock'n'Rollah in 2001. Second album Sky Pilots followed on Ranch Records in 2003. Both albums were also released in the United States on Jetset Records. Third album "Keys to the Highway" was released early 2007.

In 2021 their latest studio album Silver Flames was released on Finnish label Svart Records. The band told journalist Jyrki "Spider" Hämäläinen that their guitarist Jeffrey Lee Burns had returned back to the band with the condition that they would record new material. Recording of the album took a couple of weeks and there were no overdubs recorded apart from some vocals.

== Current line-up ==
- Eduardo Martinez - vocals (1995–present)
- Ski Williamson - guitar (1995–present)
- Jay Burnside - drums (1995–present)
- Jeffrey Lee Burns - guitar (1996-2001, 2018–present)
- Rami Helin - bass (2021–present)

=== Former members ===
- The Punisher - bass (1995-2013, 2018-2020)
- Vilunki 3000 - guitar (1995-1996)
- Johnny Volume - guitar (2000-2003)
- Peevo de Luxe - guitar (2003-2016)

== Discography ==
=== Studio albums ===
- Hallelujah Rock'n'Rollah (Bad Afro, 2001)
- Save Rock'n'Roll (Jetset, American version of Hallelujah Rock'n'Rollah, 2002)
- Sky Pilots (Ranch/Jetset, 2003 / Bitzcore 2004)
- Keys to the Highway (Ranch/Bitzcore, 2007)
- Silver Flames (Svart, 2021)

=== Compilations ===
- It's Time to Testify ... Brothers and Sisters (Bad Afro, 1999)
- Back to the Grave (Bad Afro, 2006)
- Back 2 the Grave (El Beasto, 2008)

=== Live albums ===
- Bama Lama Boogaloo! (Smokin' Troll, 1997)
- It's Time to Testify Again (No Fun, 2002)
- Mobile Graceland (Lonestar, 2005)
- Burn Rock'n'Roll (Rastrillo, 2006)

=== Singles and EP's ===
- Close to Disaster (Metamorphos, 1997)
- Get Down or Get Out (Bad Afro, 1998)
- It's Time to Testify (Bad Afro, 1998)
- Jaguar Girls (Estrus, 1999)
- Cantan en Español (Safety Pin, 2000)
- Loose My Soul (Bang, 2000)
- Street Survivor (Bad Afro, 2001)
- Loose My Soul (Bad Afro/Spinefarm, 2001)
- World Domination (Sweet Nothing, 2001)
- Live! (Fandango, 2001)
- Flowers (Bad Afro/Spinefarm, 2002)
- Bam-A-Lam en Español, vol 2 (Safety Pin, 2002)
- Let Me take You Far (Ranch 2003 / Lonestar 2004)
- Since the Beginning (Ranch 2003 / Lonestar 2004)
- Save Rock'n'Roll (Ranch, 2003)
- Lost Generation (Ranch, 2006)
- Count Me Out (Bad Afro, 2006)
- En Español, vol 3 (El Beasto, 2010)
- Heavy Tiger (Chaputa, 2016)
- Soulshaking (Chaputa, 2019)
- Trance-Noché (Chaputa, 2019)
- A Song for Robert (Chaputa, 2021)
- Silver Flame (Chaputa, 2021)

=== Split records ===
- White Trash Soul (with The Hellacopters) (Bad Afro, 2001)
- La Luz de Cristo (with Thee Virus) (El Beasto, 2001)
- The Flaming Sideburns vs. Flanelon Crash (with Flanelon Crash) (Lixo Urbano, 2001)
- The Flaming Sideburns vs. Elio & Thee Horribles (Bad Attitude, 2002)
- The Flaming Sideburns vs. Boozed (Bitzcore, 2006)
- The Flaming Sideburns vs. The Maharajas (Chaputa, 2021)

== In popular culture ==
In The Wire, "Loose My Soul" is playing on Ziggy's car radio, when he is blocked by Proposition Joe's nephew, Melvin "Cheese" Wagstaff and beaten up.
