= Dancing Bear =

Croatian record label

Dancing Bear is a Croatian record label.

Artists that released their albums on the label include The Bambi Molesters, Crooks & Straights, Daleka obala, Darko Rundek, Dino Dvornik, Goribor, Gustafi, Hladno pivo, Ibrica Jusić, James Night, Dunja Knebl, Kojoti, Leteći odred, Dalmatino, and Majke.

Dancing Bear publishes music from the Warner/Chappell Music catalog, as their representative in the region.

"Dancing Bear" is also a 1967 hit single by the crossover American folk band, The Mamas and the Papas.
