= Tvoje lice zvuči poznato (Croatian TV series) season 5 =

Tvoje lice zvuči poznato
- Season 5
- No. of episodes: 13

Release
- Original network: Nova TV
- Original release: 18 March – 10 June 2018

Season chronology
- ← Previous; Season 4 Next → Season 6

Tvoje lice zvuči poznato is the Croatian version of Your Face Sounds Familiar. It first aired on 18 March 2018, and concluded the run on 10 June 2018. The previous judges (actor Goran Navojec, vocalist Sandra Bagarić and musician Tomo in der Mühlen) have left the show and have been replaced by the winners of the previous four seasons.

== Format ==
The show challenges celebrities (singers and actors) to perform as different iconic music artists every week, which are chosen by the show's "Randomiser". They are then judged by the panel of celebrity judges. Each celebrity gets transformed into a different singer every week, and performs an iconic song and dance routine well known by that particular singer. The Randomiser can choose any older or younger artist available in the machine, even a singer of the opposite sex, or a deceased singer. In third season (Week 3), ability to use a joker was introduced. If celebrity wasn't happy with the Randomiser's output or thought that the task is too hard, they could ask some other celebrity to perform instead of them, but just once per season. It was announced that the show will get even more new content in the fourth season, but the 'Joker' ability was removed. The new content in the fourth season was the introduction of holographic performances. If the "Randomiser" chooses a celebrity should perform a duet, they can do it using the pre-recorded hologram for one of the given singers. In the fifth season, celebrity contestant can perform as another celebrity with a child transformed in the same celebrity. The child-contestant duo acts include: Damir Poljicak & David Bojcic as Elvis Presley, Davor Dretar & Ivor Leskovar as Will Smith, Paola Valic Bekic & Tara Roki as Taylor Swift, Amel Curic & Vito Ljubicic as Miso Kovac, Maja Bajamic & Elena Brnic as Beyoncé, Marko Knesaurek & Ursula Divosevic as Katy Perry, Katarina Baban & Gabrijel Rodic as Bruno Mars, and Ana Vilenica & Eva Biljan as Whitney Houston. The winner of every episode gets to donate 10 000 HRK, while the overall leader gets to donate 40 000 HRK at the end of the season. The show lasts for 13 weeks.

=== Voting ===
The contestants are awarded points from the judges (and each other) based on their singing and dance routines. Judges award from 4 to 12 - excluding 11 - points to each contestant. After that, each contestant gives 5 points to a fellow contestant of their choice (known as "Bonus" points). In week 12 (semi-final week), four contestants with the highest number of votes will qualify to the final. In week 13 (grand final), previous points will be transformed into a 4-7 system, the jury will award from 8 to 12 points, and contestants will give 5 points to a fellow contestant of their choice.

=== Judges ===
- Nives Celzijus - Croatian actress and singer.
- Saša Lozar - Croatian singer.
- Mario Petreković - Croatian comedian and actor.
- Damir Kedžo - Croatian singer.

== Contestants ==
| Celebrity | Week 1 | Week 2 | Week 3 | Week 4 | Week 5 | Week 6 | Week 7 | Week 8 | Week 9 | Week 10 | Week 11 | Semi-Final | Final | Total |
|---|---|---|---|---|---|---|---|---|---|---|---|---|---|---|
| Maja Bajamić | 61 | 37 | 39 | 27 | 47 | 25 | 50 | 68 | 32 | 37 | 39 | 58 | 520 | |
| Paola Valić Bekić | 32 | 41 | 29 | 35 | 25 | 78 | 37 | 17 | 51 | 59 | 49 | 22 | 475 | |
| Katarina Baban | 48 | 19 | 40 | 33 | 34 | 41 | 24 | 42 | 68 | 31 | 38 | 35 | 453 | |
| Amel Ćurić | 23 | 63 | 17 | 26 | 30 | 44 | 42 | 24 | 27 | 33 | 54 | 54 | 437 | |
| Damir Poljičak | 50 | 40 | 68 | 16 | 53 | 21 | 20 | 28 | 45 | 26 | 23 | 32 | 422 | |
| Davor Dretar Drele | 32 | 30 | 30 | 49 | 54 | 16 | 42 | 33 | 18 | 44 | 22 | 39 | 409 | |
| Ana Vilenica | 19 | 30 | 24 | 73 | 21 | 33 | 17 | 45 | 18 | 16 | 34 | 19 | 359 | |
| Matko Knešaurek | 19 | 24 | 37 | 25 | 20 | 26 | 52 | 28 | 25 | 38 | 25 | 25 | 344 | |

Color key:

indicates the winning contestant that week
indicates the contestant with fewest points that week
indicates the series winner
indicates the series runner-up

== Performance chart ==
| Contestant | Week 1 | Week 2 | Week 3 | Week 4 | Week 5 | Week 6 | Week 7 | Week 8 | Week 9 | Week 10 | Week 11 | Week 12 | Final |
|---|---|---|---|---|---|---|---|---|---|---|---|---|---|
| Maja Bajamić | Aretha Franklin | Labh Janjua (Panjabi MC) | Doris Dragović | Carl Douglas | Jasmin Stavros | Danijela Martinović | Beyoncé | Michael Jackson | Senna M | John Legend | Jennifer Lopez | Indira Levak (Colonia) | Catherine Zeta-Jones (Chicago) |
| Paola Valić Bekić | Željko Bebek (Bijelo Dugme) | Tina Turner | Barry Gibb (Bee Gees) | Daniel Popović | Taylor Swift | Sia | Davor Gobac (Psihomodo Pop) | Tionne Watkins (TLC) | Kasandra | Nicki Minaj | Terry Ellis (En Vogue) | Robbie Williams | Celine Dion |
| Katarina Baban | Shakira | Ricky Martin | Jason Derulo | Jelena Rozga (Magazin) | Mladen Bodalec (Prljavo Kazalište) | Rihanna | Prince | Joško Čagalj Jole | Nicole Scherzinger (The Pussycat Dolls) | Bruno Mars | Kim Sasabone (Vengaboys) | Nered (Nered & Stoka) | Britney Spears |
| Amel Ćurić | Massimo Savić (Dorian Grey) | Josipa Lisac | Bobby Farrell (Boney M.) | Madonna | J Balvin | Mišo Kovač | Tajči | Halid Bešlić | Celia Cruz | Sylvester | Kićo Slabinac | Barry White | Toto Cutugno |
| Damir Poljičak | Amii Stewart | Elvis Presley | Dan Reynolds (Imagine Dragons) | Mariah Carey | Joe Cocker | Maja Šuput | Jelena Rozga (Magazin) | Milo Hrnić | Luciano Pavarotti | Alka Vuica | George Michael (Wham) | Pink | Mladen Bodalec (Prljavo Kazalište) |
| Davor Dretar Drele | Mile Kekin (Hladno Pivo) | Neda Ukraden | Will Smith | Ljupka Dimitrovska | Cher | Ed Sheeran | Heather Small (M People) | Zdenka Kovačiček | Bob Marley | Tereza Kesovija | Esma Redžepova | Missy Elliott | Doris Dragović |
| Ana Vilenica | Lady Gaga | Kelis | Justin Timberlake | Kurt Cobain (Nirvana) | Lana Jurčević | Rockwell | Dalibor Brun | Camila Cabello | Robert Bell (Kool & The Gang) | Stevie Wonder | Whitney Houston | Michel Telo | Alejandro Sanz |
| Matko Knešaurek | Beyoncé | Freddie Mercury (Queen) | Severina | Gene Kelly | Mel B (Spice Girls) | Anthony Kiedis (Red Hot Chili Peppers) | Luis Fonsi | Lionel Richie | Katy Perry | Franky Gee (Captain Jack) | Zdravko Čolić | Melanie Thornton (La Bouche) | Christina Aguilera |

Color key:

indicates the contestant came first that week
indicates the contestant came second that week
indicates the contestant came last that week

== Week 1 ==
Aired: March 18, 2018
Winner: Maja Bajamić

| Order | Celebrity | Performing as | Song | Points (judges and contestants) | | | | | Total | Result |
| Order | Celebrity | Performing as | Song | Mario | Damir | Nives | Sasa | Bonus | Total | Result |
|---|---|---|---|---|---|---|---|---|---|---|
| 1 | Davor Dretar Drele | Hladno Pivo | "Svijet glamura" | 8 | 8 | 8 | 8 | 0 | 32 | 4th |
| 2 | Matko Knešaurek | Beyoncé | "Crazy in Love" | 4 | 4 | 6 | 5 | 0 | 19 | 8th |
| 3 | Maja Bajamić | Aretha Franklin | "Think" | 12 | 10 | 12 | 12 | 15 | 61 | 1st |
| 4 | Paola Valić Bekić | Bijelo dugme | "Ne spavaj mala moja muzika dok svira" | 7 | 6 | 7 | 7 | 5 | 32 | 5th |
| 5 | Amel Ćurić | Massimo Savić | "Stranac u noći" | 5 | 7 | 5 | 6 | 0 | 23 | 6th |
| 6 | Katarina Baban | Shakira | "Chantaje" | 9 | 9 | 10 | 10 | 10 | 48 | 3rd |
| 7 | Damir Poljičak | Amii Stewart | "Knock on Wood" | 10 | 12 | 9 | 9 | 10 | 50 | 2nd |
| 8 | Ana Vilenica | Lady Gaga | "Alejandro" | 6 | 5 | 4 | 4 | 0 | 19 | 8th |

Opening act

| Celebrity | Performing as | Song |
|---|---|---|
| Saša Lozar | Elton John | "Don't Stop Me Now" / "Gangsta's Paradise" |
| Mario Petreković | Tina Turner | "Don't Stop Me Now" / "Gangsta's Paradise" |
| Nives Celzijus | Coolio | "Don't Stop Me Now" / "Gangsta's Paradise" |
| Damir Kedžo | Britney Spears | "Don't Stop Me Now" / "Gangsta's Paradise" |

Bonus points

- Katarina gave five points to Maja Bajamić
- Amel gave five points to Maja Bajamić
- Matko gave five points to Katarina Baban
- Davor gave five points to Damir Poljičak
- Maja gave five points to Damir Poljičak
- Ana gave five points to Maja Bajamić
- Damir gave five points to Paola Valić Bekić
- Paola gave five points to Katarina Baban

== Week 2 ==
Aired: March 25, 2018
Winner: Amel Ćurić

| Order | Celebrity | Performing as | Song | Points (judges and contestants) | | | | | Total | Result |
| Order | Celebrity | Performing as | Song | Mario | Damir | Nives | Sasa | Bonus | Total | Result |
|---|---|---|---|---|---|---|---|---|---|---|
| 1 | Katarina Baban | Ricky Martin | "The Cup of Life" | 5 | 5 | 5 | 4 | 0 | 19 | 8th |
| 2 | Amel Ćurić | Josipa Lisac | "Gdje Dunav ljubi nebo" | 8 | 9 | 12 | 9 | 25 | 63 | 1st |
| 3 | Matko Knešaurek | Freddie Mercury | "We Will Rock You" | 6 | 6 | 4 | 8 | 0 | 24 | 7th |
| 4 | Davor Dretar Drele | Neda Ukraden | "Viljamovka" | 4 | 4 | 7 | 5 | 10 | 30 | 5th |
| 5 | Maja Bajamić | Panjabi MC | "Mundian To Bach Ke" | 9 | 10 | 8 | 10 | 0 | 37 | 4th |
| 6 | Ana Vilenica | Kelis | "Trick Me" | 7 | 7 | 10 | 6 | 0 | 30 | 6th |
| 7 | Damir Poljičak & David Bojčić | Elvis Presley | "Blue Suede Shoes" | 10 | 12 | 6 | 12 | 0 | 40 | 3rd |
| 8 | Paola Valić Bekić | Tina Turner | "Golden Eye" | 12 | 8 | 9 | 7 | 5 | 41 | 2nd |

Bonus points

- Katarina gave five points to Davor Dretar Drele
- Amel gave five points to Paola Valić Bekić
- Matko gave five points to Davor Dretar Drele
- Davor gave five points to Amel Ćurić
- Maja gave five points to Amel Ćurić
- Ana gave five points to Amel Ćurić
- Damir gave five points to Amel Ćurić
- Paola gave five points to Amel Ćurić

== Week 3 ==
Aired: April 1, 2018
Winner: Damir Poljičak

| Order | Celebrity | Performing as | Song | Points (judges and contestants) | | | | | Total | Result |
| Order | Celebrity | Performing as | Song | Mario | Damir | Nives | Sasa | Bonus | Total | Result |
|---|---|---|---|---|---|---|---|---|---|---|
| 1 | Katarina Baban | Jason Derulo | "Swalla" | 10 | 10 | 12 | 8 | 0 | 40 | 2nd |
| 2 | Amel Ćurić | Boney M. | "Rasputin" | 5 | 4 | 4 | 4 | 0 | 17 | 8th |
| 3 | Matko Knešaurek | Severina | "Uno momento" | 6 | 7 | 8 | 6 | 10 | 37 | 4th |
| 4 | Davor Dretar Drele & Ivor Leskovar | Will Smith | "Men in Black" | 8 | 8 | 7 | 7 | 0 | 30 | 5th |
| 5 | Maja Bajamić | Doris Dragović | "Sedam mora, sedam gora" | 9 | 12 | 9 | 9 | 0 | 39 | 3rd |
| 6 | Ana Vilenica | Justin Timberlake | "Can't Stop the Feeling!" | 4 | 5 | 5 | 5 | 5 | 24 | 7th |
| 7 | Damir Poljičak | Imagine Dragons | "Thunder" | 12 | 10 | 9 | 12 | 25 | 68 | 1st |
| 8 | Paola Valić Bekić | Bee Gees | "Night Fever" | 7 | 6 | 6 | 10 | 0 | 29 | 6th |

Bonus points

- Katarina gave five points to Ana Vilenica
- Amel gave five points to Damir Poljičak
- Matko gave five points to Damir Poljičak
- Davor gave five points to Matko Knešaurek
- Maja gave five points to Damir Poljičak
- Ana gave five points to Damir Poljičak
- Damir gave five points to Matko Knešaurek
- Paola gave five points to Damir Poljičak

== Week 4 ==
Aired: April 8, 2018
Winner: Ana Vilenica

| Order | Celebrity | Performing as | Song | Points (judges and contestants) | | | | | Total | Result |
| Order | Celebrity | Performing as | Song | Damir | Mario | Nives | Sasa | Bonus | Total | Result |
|---|---|---|---|---|---|---|---|---|---|---|
| 1 | Katarina Baban | Jelena Rozga | "Gospe moja" / "Dobitna kombinacija" | 9 | 7 | 8 | 9 | 0 | 33 | 4th |
| 2 | Amel Ćurić | Madonna | "Holiday" | 7 | 6 | 6 | 7 | 0 | 26 | 6th |
| 3 | Matko Knešaurek | Gene Kelly | "Singin' in the Rain" | 5 | 5 | 5 | 5 | 5 | 25 | 7th |
| 4 | Davor Dretar Drele | Ljupka Dimitrovska | "Ta tvoja barka mala" | 10 | 12 | 12 | 10 | 5 | 49 | 2nd |
| 5 | Maja Bajamić | Carl Douglas | "Kung Fu Fighting" | 6 | 8 | 7 | 6 | 0 | 27 | 5th |
| 6 | Ana Vilenica | Kurt Cobain | "Smells Like Teen Spirit" | 12 | 10 | 9 | 12 | 30 | 73 | 1st |
| 7 | Damir Poljičak | Mariah Carey | "Fantasy" | 4 | 4 | 4 | 4 | 0 | 16 | 8th |
| 8 | Paola Valić Bekić | Daniel Popović | "Đeni nosi kečke" | 8 | 9 | 10 | 8 | 0 | 35 | 3rd |

Bonus points

- Katarina gave five points to Matko Knešaurek
- Amel gave five points to Ana Vilenica
- Matko gave five points to Ana Vilenica
- Davor gave five points to Ana Vilenica
- Maja gave five points to Ana Vilenica
- Ana gave five points to Davor Dretar Drele
- Damir gave five points to Ana Vilenica
- Paola gave five points to Ana Vilenica

== Week 5 ==
Aired: April 15, 2018
Winner: Davor Dretar Drele

| Order | Celebrity | Performing as | Song | Points (judges and contestants) | | | | | Total | Result |
| Order | Celebrity | Performing as | Song | Sasa | Mario | Nives | Damir | Bonus | Total | Result |
|---|---|---|---|---|---|---|---|---|---|---|
| 1 | Paola Valić Bekić & Tara Roki | Taylor Swift | "We Are Never Ever Getting Back Together" | 6 | 6 | 7 | 6 | 0 | 25 | 6th |
| 2 | Maja Bajamic | Jasmin Stavros | "Dao bih sto Amerika" | 10 | 9 | 9 | 9 | 10 | 47 | 3rd |
| 3 | Matko Knešaurek | Spice Girls | "Spice Up Your Life" | 5 | 5 | 5 | 5 | 0 | 20 | 8th |
| 4 | Katarina Baban | Prljavo kazalište | "Mi plešemo" | 8 | 7 | 6 | 8 | 5 | 34 | 4th |
| 5 | Davor Dretar Drele | Cher | "Dov'è l'amore" | 9 | 10 | 10 | 10 | 15 | 54 | 1st |
| 6 | Ana Vilenica | Lana Jurčević | "Kim Kardashian" | 4 | 4 | 4 | 4 | 5 | 21 | 7th |
| 7 | Damir Poljičak | Joe Cocker | "Unchain My Heart" | 12 | 12 | 12 | 12 | 5 | 53 | 2nd |
| 8 | Amel Curic | J Balvin | "Mi Gente" | 7 | 8 | 8 | 7 | 0 | 30 | 5th |

Bonus points

- Katarina gave five points to Damir Poljičak
- Amel gave five points to Davor Dretar Drele
- Matko gave five points to Davor Dretar Drele
- Davor gave five points to Maja Bajamić
- Maja gave five points to Davor Dretar Drele
- Ana gave five points to Katarina Baban
- Damir gave five points to Ana Vilenica
- Paola gave five points to Maja Bajamić

== Week 6 ==
Aired: April 22, 2018
Winner: Paola Valić Bekić

| Order | Celebrity | Performing as | Song | Points (judges and contestants) | | | | | Total | Result |
| Order | Celebrity | Performing as | Song | Mario | Damir | Nives | Sasa | Bonus | Total | Result |
|---|---|---|---|---|---|---|---|---|---|---|
| 1 | Katarina Baban | Rihanna | "Work" | 9 | 10 | 9 | 8 | 5 | 41 | 3rd |
| 2 | Amel Ćurić & Vito Ljubičić | Mišo Kovač | "Još i danas teku suze jedne zene" | 10 | 9 | 10 | 10 | 5 | 44 | 2nd |
| 3 | Matko Knešaurek | Red Hot Chili Peppers | "Aeroplane" | 7 | 6 | 7 | 6 | 0 | 26 | 5th |
| 4 | Davor Dretar Drele | Ed Sheeran | "Shape of You" | 4 | 4 | 4 | 4 | 0 | 16 | 8th |
| 5 | Maja Bajamić | Danijela Martinović | "Da je slađe zaspati" | 6 | 7 | 5 | 7 | 0 | 25 | 6th |
| 6 | Ana Vilenica | Rockwell | "Somebody's Watching Me" | 8 | 8 | 8 | 9 | 0 | 33 | 4th |
| 7 | Damir Poljičak | Maja Šuput | "Ne lomi mi srce" | 5 | 5 | 6 | 5 | 0 | 21 | 7th |
| 8 | Paola Valić Bekić | Sia | "Chandelier" | 12 | 12 | 12 | 12 | 30 | 78 | 1st |

Bonus points

- Katarina gave five points to Paola Valić Bekić
- Amel gave five points to Paola Valić Bekić
- Matko gave five points to Paola Valić Bekić
- Davor gave five points to Katarina Baban
- Maja gave five points to Paola Valić Bekić
- Ana gave five points to Paola Valić Bekić
- Damir gave five points to Paola Valić Bekić
- Paola gave five points to Amel Ćurić

== Week 7 ==
Aired: April 29, 2018
Winner: Matko Knešaurek

| Order | Celebrity | Performing as | Song | Points (judges and contestants) | | | | | Total | Result |
| Order | Celebrity | Performing as | Song | Mario | Damir | Nives | Sasa | Bonus | Total | Result |
|---|---|---|---|---|---|---|---|---|---|---|
| 1 | Katarina Baban | Prince | "When Doves Cry" | 6 | 7 | 5 | 6 | 0 | 24 | 6th |
| 2 | Amel Ćurić | Tajči | "Bube u glavi" | 8 | 8 | 9 | 12 | 5 | 42 | 3rd |
| 3 | Matko Knešaurek | Luis Fonsi | "Despacito" | 9 | 12 | 12 | 9 | 10 | 52 | 1st |
| 4 | Davor Dretar Drele | M People | "Moving On Up" | 12 | 9 | 8 | 8 | 5 | 42 | 3rd |
| 5 | Maja Bajamić & Elena Brnić | Beyoncé | "Listen" | 10 | 10 | 10 | 10 | 10 | 50 | 2nd |
| 6 | Ana Vilenica | Dalibor Brun | "Nisi ti više crno vino" | 4 | 4 | 4 | 5 | 0 | 17 | 8th |
| 7 | Damir Poljičak | Jelena Rozga | "Suze biserne" | 5 | 5 | 6 | 4 | 0 | 20 | 7th |
| 8 | Paola Valić Bekić | Psihomodo Pop | "Frida" | 7 | 6 | 7 | 7 | 10 | 37 | 5th |

Bonus points

- Katarina gave five points to Amel Ćurić
- Amel gave five points to Matko Knešaurek
- Matko gave five points to Paola Valić Bekić
- Davor gave five points to Maja Bajamić
- Maja gave five points to Paola Valić Bekić
- Ana gave five points to Matko Knešaurek
- Damir gave five points to Davor Dretar Drele
- Paola gave five points to Maja Bajamić

== Week 8 ==
Aired: May 6, 2018
Winner: Maja Bajamić

| Order | Celebrity | Performing as | Song | Points (judges and contestants) | | | | | Total | Result |
| Order | Celebrity | Performing as | Song | Damir | Nives | Sasa | Mario | Bonus | Total | Result |
|---|---|---|---|---|---|---|---|---|---|---|
| 1 | Katarina Baban | Jole | "Duša od papira" | 8 | 10 | 9 | 10 | 5 | 42 | 3rd |
| 2 | Amel Ćurić | Halid Bešlić | "Iznad Tešnja zora sviće" | 5 | 5 | 4 | 5 | 5 | 24 | 7th |
| 3 | Matko Knešaurek | Lionel Richie | "Hello" | 9 | 6 | 6 | 7 | 0 | 28 | 6th |
| 4 | Davor Dretar Drele | Zdenka Kovačiček | "Frka" | 6 | 7 | 10 | 9 | 0 | 33 | 4th |
| 5 | Maja Bajamić | Michael Jackson | "Billie Jean" | 12 | 12 | 12 | 12 | 20 | 68 | 1st |
| 6 | Ana Vilenica | Camila Cabello | "Havana" | 10 | 9 | 8 | 8 | 10 | 45 | 2nd |
| 7 | Damir Poljičak | Milo Hrnić | "Kome bi šumilo" | 7 | 8 | 7 | 6 | 0 | 28 | 5th |
| 8 | Paola Valić Bekić | TLC | "No Scrubs" | 4 | 4 | 5 | 4 | 0 | 17 | 8th |

Bonus points

- Katarina gave five points to Ana Vilenica
- Amel gave five points to Maja Bajamić
- Matko gave five points to Amel Ćurić
- Davor gave five points to Maja Bajamić
- Maja gave five points to Ana Vilenica
- Ana gave five points to Maja Bajamić
- Damir gave five points to Maja Bajamić
- Paola gave five points to Maja Bajamić

== Week 9 ==
Aired: May 13, 2018
Winner: Katarina Baban

| Order | Celebrity | Performing as | Song | Points (judges and contestants) | | | | | Total | Result |
| Order | Celebrity | Performing as | Song | Mario | Nives | Sasa | Damir | Bonus | Total | Result |
|---|---|---|---|---|---|---|---|---|---|---|
| 1 | Katarina Baban | The Pussycat Dolls | "Buttons" | 12 | 10 | 9 | 12 | 25 | 68 | 1st |
| 2 | Amel Ćurić | Celia Cruz | "Oye Como Va" | 6 | 7 | 7 | 7 | 0 | 27 | 5th |
| 3 | Matko Knešaurek & Uršula Divošević | Katy Perry | "Roar" | 7 | 6 | 6 | 6 | 0 | 25 | 6th |
| 4 | Davor Dretar Drele | Bob Marley | "Could You Be Loved" | 4 | 4 | 5 | 5 | 0 | 18 | 8th |
| 5 | Maja Bajamić | Senna M | "Tuc tuc" | 8 | 8 | 8 | 8 | 0 | 32 | 4th |
| 6 | Ana Vilenica | Kool & the Gang | "Celebration" | 5 | 5 | 4 | 4 | 0 | 18 | 8th |
| 7 | Damir Poljičak | Luciano Pavarotti | "Caruso" | 9 | 12 | 10 | 9 | 5 | 45 | 3rd |
| 8 | Paola Valić Bekić | Kasandra | "Nisi ti jedini na svijetu" | 10 | 9 | 12 | 10 | 10 | 51 | 2nd |

Bonus points

- Katarina gave five points to Paola Valić Bekić
- Amel gave five points to Katarina Baban
- Matko gave five points to Katarina Baban
- Davor gave five points to Katarina Baban
- Maja gave five points to Paola Valić Bekić
- Ana gave five points to Katarina Baban
- Damir gave five points to Katarina Baban
- Paola gave five points to Damir Poljičak

== Week 10 ==
Aired: May 20, 2018
Winner: Paola Valić Bekić

| Order | Celebrity | Performing as | Song | Points (judges and contestants) | | | | | Total | Result |
| Order | Celebrity | Performing as | Song | Sasa | Damir | Nives | Mario | Bonus | Total | Result |
|---|---|---|---|---|---|---|---|---|---|---|
| 1 | Katarina Baban & Gabrijel Rodić | Bruno Mars | "The Lazy Song" | 5 | 5 | 6 | 5 | 10 | 31 | 6th |
| 2 | Amel Ćurić | Sylvester | "You Make Me Feel" | 8 | 8 | 9 | 8 | 0 | 33 | 5th |
| 3 | Matko Knešaurek | Captain Jack | "Iko Iko" | 7 | 7 | 5 | 9 | 10 | 38 | 3rd |
| 4 | Davor Dretar Drele | Tereza Kesovija | "Nono dobri moj nono" | 10 | 10 | 12 | 12 | 0 | 44 | 2nd |
| 5 | Maja Bajamić | John Legend | "All of Me" | 9 | 9 | 7 | 7 | 5 | 37 | 4th |
| 6 | Ana Vilenica | Stevie Wonder | "Part-Time Lover" | 4 | 4 | 4 | 4 | 0 | 16 | 8th |
| 7 | Damir Poljičak | Alka Vuica | "Od kad te nema" | 6 | 6 | 8 | 6 | 0 | 26 | 7th |
| 8 | Paola Valić Bekić | Nicki Minaj | "Pound the Alarm" | 12 | 12 | 10 | 10 | 15 | 59 | 1st |

Bonus points

- Katarina gave five points to Matko Knešaurek
- Amel gave five points to Paola Valić Bekić
- Matko gave five points to Katarina Baban
- Davor gave five points to Matko Knešaurek
- Maja gave five points to Paola Valić Bekić
- Ana gave five points to Paola Valić Bekić
- Damir gave five points to Katarina Baban
- Paola gave five points to Maja Bajamić

== Week 11 ==
Aired: May 27, 2018
Winner: Amel Ćurić

| Order | Celebrity | Performing as | Song | Points (judges and contestants) | | | | | Total | Result |
| Order | Celebrity | Performing as | Song | Nives | Mario | Sasa | Damir | Bonus | Total | Result |
|---|---|---|---|---|---|---|---|---|---|---|
| 1 | Katarina Baban | Vengaboys | "Sha-La-La-La-La" | 10 | 10 | 9 | 9 | 0 | 38 | 4th |
| 2 | Amel Ćurić | Kićo Slabinac | "Tri slatke riječi" | 8 | 7 | 12 | 12 | 15 | 54 | 1st |
| 3 | Matko Knešaurek | Zdravko Čolić | "Ruška" | 5 | 6 | 4 | 5 | 5 | 25 | 6th |
| 4 | Davor Dretar Drele | Esma Redžepova | "Romano horo" | 6 | 4 | 5 | 7 | 0 | 22 | 8th |
| 5 | Maja Bajamić | Jennifer Lopez | "On the Floor" | 9 | 9 | 8 | 8 | 5 | 39 | 3rd |
| 6 | Ana Vilenica & Eva Biljan | Whitney Houston | "How Will I Know" | 7 | 5 | 6 | 6 | 10 | 34 | 5th |
| 7 | Damir Poljičak | Wham! | "The Edge of Heaven" | 4 | 8 | 7 | 4 | 0 | 23 | 7th |
| 8 | Paola Valić Bekić | En Vogue | "Free Your Mind" | 12 | 12 | 10 | 10 | 5 | 49 | 2nd |

Bonus points

- Paola gave five points to Matko Knešaurek
- Amel gave five points to Paola Valić Bekić
- Matko gave five points to Ana Vilenica
- Davor gave five points to Ana Vilenica
- Maja gave five points to Amel Ćurić
- Ana gave five points to Maja Bajamić
- Damir gave five points to Amel Ćurić
- Katarina gave five points to Amel Ćurić

== Week 12 ==
Aired: June 3, 2018
Winner: Maja Bajamić

| Order | Celebrity | Performing as | Song | Points (judges and contestants) | | | | | Total | Result |
| Order | Celebrity | Performing as | Song | Sasa | Mario | Maja Šuput | Damir | Bonus | Total | Result |
|---|---|---|---|---|---|---|---|---|---|---|
| 1 | Katarina Baban | Nered | "Srce vatreno" | 10 | 8 | 9 | 8 | 0 | 35 | 4th |
| 2 | Amel Ćurić | Barry White | "Let The Music Play" | 9 | 10 | 10 | 10 | 15 | 54 | 2nd |
| 3 | Matko Knešaurek | La Bouche | "Be My Lover" | 5 | 6 | 5 | 4 | 5 | 25 | 6th |
| 4 | Davor Dretar Drele | Missy Elliott | "Get Ur Freak On" | 8 | 9 | 8 | 9 | 5 | 39 | 3rd |
| 5 | Maja Bajamić | Colonia | "Svijet voli pobjednike" | 12 | 12 | 12 | 12 | 10 | 58 | 1st |
| 6 | Ana Vilenica | Michel Teló | "Ai Se Eu Te Pego" | 6 | 4 | 4 | 5 | 0 | 19 | 8th |
| 7 | Damir Poljičak | Pink | "What About Us" | 7 | 7 | 6 | 7 | 5 | 32 | 5th |
| 8 | Paola Valić Bekić | Robbie Williams | "Rock DJ" | 4 | 5 | 7 | 6 | 0 | 22 | 7th |

Bonus points

- Paola gave five points to Amel Ćurić
- Amel gave five points to Damir Poljičak
- Matko gave five points to Maja Bajamić
- Davor gave five points to Amel Ćurić
- Maja gave five points to Davor Dretar
- Ana gave five points to Matko Knešaurek
- Damir gave five points to Amel Ćurić
- Katarina gave five points to Maja Bajamić

== Week 13 - Final ==
Aired: June 10, 2018
Winner: Maja Bajamić

| Order | Celebrity | Performing as | Song | Points (starting, judges, contestants) | | | | | | Total | Result |
| Order | Celebrity | Performing as | Song | Starting | Mario | Sasa | Damir | Nives | Bonus | Total | Result |
|---|---|---|---|---|---|---|---|---|---|---|---|
| 1 | Maja Bajamić | Catherine Zeta-Jones | "All That Jazz" | 7 | 12 | 10 | 12 | 10 | 20 | 71 | 1st |
| 2 | Paola Valić Bekić | Celine Dion | "Because You Loved Me" | 6 | 8 | 8 | 8 | 8 | 5 | 43 | 4th |
| 3 | Katarina Baban | Britney Spears | "I'm a Slave 4 U" | 5 | 10 | 12 | 9 | 12 | 10 | 58 | 2nd |
| 4 | Amel Ćurić | Toto Cutugno | "Insieme: 1992" | 4 | 9 | 9 | 10 | 9 | 5 | 46 | 3rd |
| 5 | Damir Poljičak | Mladen Bodalec | "Baklje ivanjske" | Not competing | | | | | | | 5th |
| 5 | Davor Dretar Drele | Doris Dragović | "Baklje ivanjske" | Not competing | | | | | | | 6th |
| 6 | Ana Vilenica | Alejandro Fernández | "Hoy Tengo Ganas de Ti" | Not competing | | | | | | | 7th |
| 6 | Matko Knešaurek | Christina Aguilera | "Hoy Tengo Ganas de Ti" | Not competing | | | | | | | 8th |

== See also ==
- Tvoje lice zvuči poznato (Croatian TV series)
- Tvoje lice zvuči poznato (Croatian season 1)
- Tvoje lice zvuči poznato (Croatian season 2)
- Tvoje lice zvuči poznato (Croatian season 3)
- Tvoje lice zvuči poznato (Croatian season 4)
