= Tvoje lice zvuči poznato (Croatian TV series) season 3 =

Tvoje lice zvuči poznato
- Season 3
- No. of episodes: 13

Release
- Original network: Nova TV
- Original release: 25 September – 18 December 2016

Season chronology
- ← Previous; Season 2 Next → Season 4

Tvoje lice zvuči poznato is the Croatian version of Your Face Sounds Familiar. The third season started on September 25, 2016. There are four judges in season three, Goran Navojec (actor), Sandra Bagarić (opera singer), Tomo in der Mühlen (music producer & DJ) and different guest judges in every episode.

== Format ==
The show challenges celebrities (singers and actors) to perform as different iconic music artists every week, which are chosen by the show's "Randomiser". They are then judged by the panel of celebrity judges including Goran Navojec, Sandra Bagarić and Tomo in der Mühlen. Every week, one celebrity guest judge joins Goran, Sandra and Tomo to make up the complete judging panel. Each celebrity gets transformed into a different singer every week, and performs an iconic song and dance routine well known by that particular singer. The Randomiser can choose any older or younger artist available in the machine, even a singer of the opposite sex, or a deceased singer. In third season (Week 3), ability to use a joker was introduced. If celebrity wasn't happy with the Randomiser's output or thought that the task is too hard, they could ask some other celebrity to perform instead of them, but just once per season. The winner of every episode gets to donate 10 000 HRK, while the overall leader gets to donate 40 000 HRK at the end of the season. The show lasts for 13 weeks.

=== Voting ===
The contestants are awarded points from the judges (and each other) based on their singing and dance routines. Judges award from 4 to 12 - excluding 11 - points to each contestant. After that, each contestant gives 5 points to a fellow contestant of their choice (known as "Bonus" points). In week 12 (semi-final week), four contestants with the highest number of votes will qualify to the final. In week 13 (grand final), previous points will be transformed into a 4-7 system, the jury will award from 8 to 12 points, and contestants will give 5 points to a fellow contestant of their choice.

=== Judges ===
- Goran Navojec - Croatian actor, known for many roles on television series and in feature films.
- Sandra Bagarić - Bosnian opera singer also active in Croatia
- Tomo in der Mühlen - German-born music producer and DJ based in New York City and Zagreb.

=== Guest member ===
- Saša Lozar (Week 1)
- Ecija Ojdanić (Week 2)
- Maja Šuput (Week 3)
- Indira Levak (Week 4)
- Ivan Šarić (Week 5)
- Danijela Martinović (Week 6)
- Andrea Andrassy (Week 7)
- Nives Ivanković (Week 8)
- Ivana Marić (Week 9)
- Alka Vuica (Week 10)
- Ivan Zak (Week 11)
- Mario Petreković (Week 12)
- Petar Grašo (Week 13 - Final)

== Contestants ==
Celebrity	Week 1	Week 2	Week 3	Week 4	Week 5	Week 6	Week 7	Week 8	Week 9	Week 10	Week 11	Week 12	Points	Final	Result
Damir Kedžo	46	41	43	29	37	57	34	16	34	45	27	39	448	64	1st
Ana Maras Harmander	32	36	58	26	83	22	25	38	53	26	32	22	453	56	2nd
Lana Jurčević	39	42	23	32	37	29	73	35	23	35	37	45	450	55	3rd
Matteo Cetinski	28	41	22	50	27	25	55	26	21	68	23	59	445	43	4th
Filip Dizdar	25	20	28	36	33	37	21	59	46	22	68	32	427	Failed to qualify	5th
Hana Hegedušić	51	51	36	38	25	55	28	29	20	30	34	20	417	Failed to qualify	6th
Žanamari Perčić	38	17	43	48	25	30	21	47	41	26	27	22	385	Failed to qualify	7th
Fil Tilen	25	36	31	25	17	29	27	34	46	32	36	45	383	Failed to qualify	8th

Color key:

indicates the winning contestant that week
indicates the contestant with fewest points that week
indicates the series winner
indicates the series runner-up

== Performance chart ==
Contestant	Week 1	Week 2	Week 3	Week 4	Week 5	Week 6	Week 7	Week 8	Week 9	Week 10	Week 11	Semi Final	Final
Damir Kedžo	Britney Spears	Petar Grašo	Ariana Grande	Tom Jones	Tina Turner	Maria Callas (Carmen)	Jake Shears (Scissor Sisters)	Lana Jurčević	The Weeknd	Maurice White (Earth, Wind & Fire)	Doris Dragović	Lady Gaga	Mariah Carey
Ana Maras Harmander	Gloria Gaynor	Severina	Jennifer Lopez	Marko Perković Thompson	Pink	Vlado Kalember	Mick Jagger (The Rolling Stones)	Mišo Kovač	Bjork	Alka Vuica	Verka Serduchka	Meghan Trainor	Sophia Loren
Lana Jurčević	Shakira	Bobby Farrell (Boney M.)	Enrique Iglesias	Andrea Šušnjara (Magazin)	Halid Bešlić	Sean Paul	Liza Minnelli (Cabaret)	Jessie J	Justin Bieber	Joško Čagalj Jole	Davor Gobac (Psihomodo Pop)	Beyoncé	Siniša Vuco
Matteo Cetinski	Daniel Popović	Madonna	Dino Dvornik	Aki Rahimovski (Parni Valjak)	Jelena Rozga	Adele	Zdravko Čolić	Cher	Kylie Minogue	Martha Wash (The Weather Girls)	Freddie Mercury (Queen)	Goran Bare (Majke)	Elvis Presley
Filip Dizdar	Will.I.Am (The Black Eyed Peas)	Jasmin Stavros	Kasandra	Justin Timberlake	Paul McCartney (The Beatles)	Tajči	Massimo Savić	Jason Derulo	Beth Ditto (Gossip)	Anastacia	Louis Armstrong	Vinko Coce	Lidija Horvat-Dunjko
Hana Hegedušić	Mladen Grdović	Whitney Houston	Julio Iglesias	Indira Levak (Colonia)	Pitbull	Danijela Martinović (Magazin)	Gwen Stefani (No Doubt)	Cher	Zdravko Čolić	Jasna Zlokić	Christina Aguilera	George Michael (Wham!)	Al Bano
Žanamari Perčić	Željko Bebek (Bijelo Dugme)	Severina	Neno Belan (Đavoli)	Nicole Scherzinger (The Pussycat Dolls)	Fergie (The Black Eyed Peas)	Billy Joel	Vanna (Electro Team)	Prince	Kićo Slabinac	Victor Willis (Village People)	Vlatka Pokos	Bruno Mars	Danijela Martinović (Magazin)
Fil Tilen	Thomas Anders (Modern Talking)	King Africa	Right Said Fred	Indira Levak (Colonia)	Minea	Redfoo (LMFAO)	Alesha Dixon	Freedom Williams (C+C Music Factory)	Frank Sinatra	Mary J. Blige	Nikola Kojo	Rick James	Romina Power

Color key:

indicates the contestant came first that week
indicates the contestant came second that week
indicates the contestant came last that week

== Week 1 ==
Guest Judge: Saša Lozar
Aired: September 25, 2016
Winner: Hana Hegedušić

Order	Celebrity	Performing as	Song	Points (judges and contestants)					Total	Result
Order	Celebrity	Performing as	Song	Goran	Sandra	Tomo	Saša	Bonus	Total	Result
1	Matteo Cetinski	Daniel Popović	"Daj obuci Levisice"	4	7	8	4	5	28	6th
2	Damir Kedžo	Britney Spears	"Oops I Did It Again"	12	8	7	9	10	46	2nd
3	Fil Tilen	Modern Talking	"You're My Heart, You're My Soul"	5	5	4	6	5	25	7th
4	Filip Dizdar	Black Eyed Peas	"Don't Phunk With My Heart"	6	4	5	5	5	25	7th
5	Žanamari Perčić	Bijelo Dugme	"Bitanga i princeza"	9	9	10	10	0	38	4th
6	Ana Maras Harmander	Gloria Gaynor	"I Will Survive"	8	6	6	7	5	32	5th
7	Lana Jurčević	Shakira	"La Tortura"	7	10	9	8	5	39	3rd
8	Hana Hegedušić	Mladen Grdović	"Bolje živim nego ministar"	10	12	12	12	5	51	1st

Bonus points

- Matteo gave five points to Hana
- Damir gave five points to Ana Maras
- Fil gave five points to Filip
- Filip gave five points to Fil
- Žanamari gave five points to Damir
- Ana Maras gave five points to Lana
- Lana gave five points to Damir
- Hana gave five points to Matteo

== Week 2 ==
Guest Judge: Ecija Ojdanić
Aired: October 2, 2016
Winner: Hana Hegedušić

Order	Celebrity	Performing as	Song	Points (judges and contestants)					Total	Result
Order	Celebrity	Performing as	Song	Goran	Sandra	Tomo	Ecija	Bonus	Total	Result
1	Žanamari Perčić	Severina	"Brad Pitt"	4	4	4	5	0	17	8th
2	Filip Dizdar	Jasmin Stavros	"Dijamanti"	5	6	5	4	0	20	7th
3	Hana Hegedušić	Whitney Houston	"I Will Always Love You"	8	12	6	10	15	51	1st
4	Ana Maras Harmander	Severina	"Da si moj"	12	7	8	9	0	36	5th
5	Matteo Cetinski	Madonna	"Material Girl"	9	9	12	6	5	41	3rd
6	Lana Jurčević	Boney M	"Daddy cool"	7	8	10	12	5	42	2nd
7	Damir Kedžo	Petar Grašo	"Moje zlato"	6	10	7	8	10	41	3rd
8	Fil Tilen	King África	"La Bomba"	10	5	9	7	5	36	5th

Bonus points

- Žanamari gave five points to Matteo
- Filip gave five points to Lana
- Hana gave five points to Damir
- Ana Maras gave five points to Hana
- Matteo gave five points to Fil
- Lana gave five points to Hana
- Damir gave five points to Hana
- Fil gave five points to Damir

== Week 3 ==
Guest Judge: Maja Šuput
Aired: October 9, 2016
Winner: Ana Maras Harmander (Mario Petreković)

Order	Celebrity	Performing as	Song	Points (judges and contestants)					Total	Result
Order	Celebrity	Performing as	Song	Goran	Sandra	Tomo	Maja	Bonus	Total	Result
1	Fil Tilen	Right Said Fred	"I'm Too Sexy"	5	8	8	5	5	31	5th
2	Matteo Cetinski	Dino Dvornik	"Ti si mi u mislima"	4	5	4	4	5	22	8th
3	Damir Kedžo	Ariana Grande	"Problem"	7	12	10	9	5	43	2nd
4	Hana Hegedušić	Julio Iglesias	"Si Me Dejas No Vale"	8	10	6	12	0	36	4th
5	Filip Dizdar	Kasandra	"I've Got a Feeling"	9	6	7	6	0	28	6th
6	Lana Jurčević	Enrique Iglesias	"Duele el Corazón"	6	4	5	8	0	23	7th
7	Žanamari Perčić	Đavoli	"Jagode i čokolada"	10	7	9	7	10	43	2nd
8	Ana Maras Harmander (Joker)	Jennifer Lopez	"Ain't Your Mama"	12	9	12	10	15	58	1st

Jokers

- Ana Maras used her joker, Mario Petreković, winner of the first season of the show, performed instead of her and won.

Bonus points

- Fil gave five points to Matteo
- Matteo gave five points to Žanamari
- Damir gave five points to Ana Maras
- Hana gave five points to Ana Maras
- Filip gave five points to Žanamari
- Lana gave five points to Fil
- Žanamari gave five points to Ana Maras
- Ana Maras gave five points to Damir

== Week 4 ==
Guest Judge: Indira Levak
Aired: October 16, 2016
Winner: Matteo Cetinski

Order	Celebrity	Performing as	Song	Points (judges and contestants)					Total	Result
Order	Celebrity	Performing as	Song	Goran	Sandra	Tomo	Indira	Bonus	Total	Result
1	Filip Dizdar	Justin Timberlake	"SexyBack"	6	6	6	8	10	36	4th
2	Lana Jurčević	Magazin	"Kemija"	4	5	8	5	10	32	5th
3	Fil Tilen	Colonia	"Oduzimaš mi dah"	5	4	12	4	0	25	8th
4	Damir Kedžo	Tom Jones	"Sexbomb"	8	7	5	9	0	29	6th
5	Ana Maras Harmander	Thompson	"Vjetar s Dinare"	7	8	4	7	0	26	7th
6	Hana Hegedušić (Joker)	Colonia	"Ti da bu di bu da"	10	9	9	10	0	38	3rd
7	Matteo Cetinski	Parni valjak	"Jesen u meni" & "Lutka za bal"	9	10	10	6	15	50	1st
8	Žanamari Perčić	Pussycat Dolls	"Jai Ho"	12	12	7	12	5	48	2nd

Jokers

- Hana used her joker, Maja Posavec, participant in the second season of the show, performed instead of her and finished third.

Bonus points

- Filip gave five points to Matteo
- Lana gave five points to Žanamari
- Fil gave five points to Lana
- Damir gave five points to Lana
- Ana Maras gave five points to Matteo
- Hana gave five points to Matteo
- Matteo gave five points to Filip
- Žanamari gave five points to Filip

== Week 5 ==
Guest Judge: Ivan Šarić
Aired: October 24, 2016
Winner: Ana Maras Harmander

Order	Celebrity	Performing as	Song	Points (judges and contestants)					Total	Result
Order	Celebrity	Performing as	Song	Goran	Sandra	Tomo	Ivan	Bonus	Total	Result
1	Hana Hegedušić	Pitbull	"Fireball"	6	5	6	8	0	25	6th
2	Matteo Cetinski	Jelena Rozga	"Kraljica"	4	8	8	7	0	27	5th
3	Filip Dizdar	The Beatles	"Hey Jude" / "Can't Buy My Love" / "A Hard Day's Night"	8	9	5	6	5	33	4th
4	Fil Tilen	Minea	"Vrapci i komarci"	5	4	4	4	0	17	8th
5	Damir Kedžo (Joker)	Tina Turner	"Private dancer"	10	7	10	10	0	37	2nd
6	Lana Jurčević	Halid Bešlić	"Prvi poljubac"	9	10	9	9	0	37	2nd
7	Žanamari Perčić	Fergie	"A Little Party Never Killed Nobody (All We Got)"	7	6	7	5	0	25	6th
8	Ana Maras Harmander	Pink	"Try"	12	12	12	12	35	83	1st

Jokers

- Damir used his joker, Mario Lipovšek Battifiaca performed instead of him and finished second.

Bonus points

- Hana gave five points to Ana Maras
- Matteo gave five points to Ana Maras
- Filip gave five points to Ana Maras
- Fil gave five points to Ana Maras
- Damir gave five points to Ana Maras
- Lana gave five points to Ana Maras
- Žanamari gave five points to Ana Maras
- Ana Maras gave five points to Filip

== Week 6 ==
Guest Judge: Danijela Martinović
Aired: October 30, 2016
Winner: Damir Kedžo

Order	Celebrity	Performing as	Song	Points (judges and contestants)					Total	Result
Order	Celebrity	Performing as	Song	Goran	Sandra	Tomo	Danijela	Bonus	Total	Result
1	Lana Jurčević	Sean Paul	"Temperature"	4	5	7	8	5	29	5th
2	Ana Maras Harmander	Vlado Kalember	"Vino na usnama"	10	4	4	4	0	22	8th
3	Damir Kedžo	Carmen^{1} Maria Callas)	"Habanera"	9	12	9	12	15	57	1st
4	Hana Hegedušić	Danijela Martinović	"Neka mi ne svane" / "Pleši sa mnom"	12	10	8	10	15	55	2nd
5	Žanamari Perčić	Billy Joel	"Uptown Girl"	5	6	12	7	0	30	4th
6	Matteo Cetinski (Joker)	Adele	"Hello"	7	7	5	6	0	25	7th
7	Filip Dizdar	Tajči	"Smokvica"	8	9	6	9	5	37	3rd
8	Fil Tilen	LMFAO	"Sexy and I Know It"	6	8	10	5	0	29	5th

NOTES

1. This is the first time that the performer imitates a role from opera, not one celebrity.

Jokers

- Matteo used his joker, Petra Dugandžić performed instead of him.

Bonus points

- Lana gave five points to Filip
- Ana Maras gave five points to Damir
- Damir gave five points to Hana
- Hana gave five points to Damir
- Žanamari gave five points to Lana
- Matteo gave five points to Damir
- Filip gave five points to Hana
- Fil gave five points to Hana

== Week 7 ==
Guest Judge: Andrea Andrassy
Aired: November 6, 2016
Winner: Lana Jurčević

Order	Celebrity	Performing as	Song	Points (judges and contestants)					Total	Result
Order	Celebrity	Performing as	Song	Goran	Sandra	Tomo	Andrea	Bonus	Total	Result
1	Damir Kedžo	Scissor Sisters	"I Don't Feel Like Dancin'"	8	9	9	8	0	34	3rd
2	Žanamari Perčić	Electro Team	"Ne traži ljubav"	4	6	7	4	0	21	7th
3	Hana Hegedušić	Gwen Stefani	"The Sweet Escape"	7	8	6	7	0	28	4th
4	Matteo Cetinski	Zdravko Čolić	"Ti si mi u krvi"	10	10	10	10	15	55	2nd
5	Fil Tilen	Alesha Dixon	"The Boy Does Nothing"	9	5	8	5	0	27	5th
6	Ana Maras Harmander	Mick Jagger	"Start Me Up"	5	7	4	9	0	25	6th
7	Filip Dizdar	Massimo	"Benzina"	6	4	5	6	0	21	7th
8	Lana Jurčević	Liza Minnelli	"Mein Herr"	12	12	12	12	25	73	1st

Bonus points

- Damir gave five points to Lana
- Žanamari gave five points to Matteo
- Hana gave five points to Lana
- Matteo gave five points to Lana
- Fil gave five points to Matteo
- Ana Maras gave five points to Lana
- Filip gave five points to Lana
- Lana gave five points to Matteo

== Week 8 ==
Guest Judge: Nives Ivanković
Aired: November 13, 2016
Winner: Filip Dizdar

Order	Celebrity	Performing as	Song	Points (judges and contestants)					Total	Result
Order	Celebrity	Performing as	Song	Goran	Sandra	Tomo	Nives	Bonus	Total	Result
1	Matteo Cetinski	Cher	"The Shoop Shoop Song (It's In His Kiss)"	5	7	8	6	0	26	7th
2	Filip Dizdar	Jason Derulo	"Want To Want Me"	10	12	10	7	20	59	1st
3	Ana Maras Harmander	Mišo Kovač	"Svi pjevaju ja ne čujem" / "Nikoga nisam volio tako"	9	5	7	12	5	38	3rd
4	Hana Hegedušić	Cher	"Strong Enough"	8	6	6	9	0	29	6th
5	Fil Tilen	C+C Music Factory	"Gonna Make You Sweat"	6	9	9	5	5	34	5th
6	Lana Jurčević (Joker)	Jessie J	"Bang bang"	7	8	5	10	5	35	4th
7	Damir Kedžo	Lana Jurčević	"Ludo ljeto"	4	4	4	4	0	16	8th
8	Žanamari Perčić	Prince	"Purple Rain"	12	10	12	8	5	47	2nd

Jokers

- Lana used her joker, Igor Barberić, their dance coach, performed instead of her.

Bonus points

- Matteo gave five points to Filip
- Filip gave five points to Lana
- Ana Maras gave five points to Filip
- Hana gave five points to Filip
- Fil gave five points to Žanamari
- Lana gave five points to Ana Maras
- Damir gave five points to Filip
- Žanamari gave five points to Fil

== Week 9 ==
Guest Judge: Ivana Marić
Aired: November 20, 2016
Winner: Ana Maras Harmander

Order	Celebrity	Performing as	Song	Points (judges and contestants)					Total	Result
Order	Celebrity	Performing as	Song	Goran	Sandra	Tomo	Ivana	Bonus	Total	Result
1	Hana Hegedušić	Zdravko Čolić	"Glavo luda"	4	4	4	8	0	20	8th
2	Ana Maras Harmander	Björk	"It's Oh So Quiet"	12	12	12	12	5	53	1st
3	Lana Jurčević	Justin Bieber	"Sorry"	5	5	6	7	0	23	6th
4	Žanamari Perčić	Kićo Slabinac	"Zbog jedne divne crne žene"	7	8	7	9	10	41	4th
5	Damir Kedžo	The Weeknd	"Can't Feel My Face"	9	7	8	10	0	34	5th
6	Matteo Cetinski	Kylie Minogue	"Locomotion"	6	6	5	4	0	21	7th
7	Fil Tilen	Frank Sinatra	"Fly Me To The Moon"	8	9	9	5	15	46	2nd
8	Filip Dizdar (Joker)	Gossip	"Move in the Right Direction"	10	10	10	6	10	46	2nd

Jokers

- Filip used his joker, Jan Kerekeš, Croatian actor, performed instead of him.

Bonus points

- Hana gave five points to Žanamari
- Ana Maras gave five points to Žanamari
- Lana gave five points to Filip
- Žanamari gave five points to Fil
- Damir gave five points to Fil
- Matteo gave five points to Fil
- Fil gave five points to Filip
- Filip gave five points to Ana Maras

== Week 10 ==
Guest Judge: Alka Vuica
Aired: November 27, 2016
Winner: Matteo Cetinski

Order	Celebrity	Performing as	Song	Points (judges and contestants)					Total	Result
Order	Celebrity	Performing as	Song	Goran	Sandra	Tomo	Alka	Bonus	Total	Result
1	Fil Tilen	Mary J. Blige	"Family affair"	9	8	9	6	0	32	4th
2	Lana Jurčević	Jole	"Kada žene tulumare"	6	7	8	9	5	35	3rd
3	Damir Kedžo	Earth, Wind & Fire	"September"	10	10	10	10	5	45	2nd
4	Ana Maras Harmander	Alka Vuica	"Varalica"	4	5	4	8	5	26	6th
5	Filip Dizdar	Anastacia	"One Day In Your Life"	8	4	5	5	0	22	8th
6	Žaramari (Joker)	Village People	"YMCA"	5	6	6	4	5	26	6th
7	Hana Hegedušić	Jasna Zlokić	"Skitnica"	7	9	7	7	0	30	5th
8	Matteo Cetinski	The Weather Girls	"It's Raining Men"	12	12	12	12	20	68	1st

Jokers

- Žanamari used her joker, Minea, Croatian singer and participant of the first season, performed instead of her.

Bonus points

- Fil gave five points to Matteo
- Lana Maras gave five points to Ana Maras
- Damir gave five points to Matteo
- Ana Maras gave five points to Matteo
- Filip gave five points to Lana
- Žanamari Maras Maras gave five points to Damir
- Hana gave five points to Matteo
- Matteo gave five points to Žanamari

== Week 11 ==
Guest Judge: Ivan Zak
Aired: December 4, 2016
Winner: Filip Dizdar

Order	Celebrity	Performing as	Song	Points (judges and contestants)					Total	Result
Order	Celebrity	Performing as	Song	Goran	Sandra	Tomo	Ivan	Bonus	Total	Result
1	Matteo Cetinski	Freddie Mercury	"Living on my own"	5	4	4	10	0	23	8th
2	Žanamari Perčić	Vlatka Pokos	"Metak"	7	7	6	7	0	27	6th
3	Ana Maras Harmander	Verka Serduchka	"Dancing Lasha Tumbai"	10	6	7	9	0	32	5th
4	Lana Jurčević	Davor Gobac	"Ja volim samo sebe"	6	10	8	8	5	37	2nd
5	Hana Hegedušić	Christina Aguilera	"Ain't No Other Man"	9	9	5	6	5	34	4th
6	Filip Dizdar	Louis Armstrong	"What a Wonderful World"	12	12	12	12	20	68	1st
7	Damir Kedžo	Doris Dragović	"To"	4	5	9	4	5	27	6th
8	Fil Tilen (Joker)	Nikola Kojo	"Nesanica"	8	8	10	5	5	36	3rd

Jokers

- Fil used his joker, Baby Dooks, participant of the first season, performed instead of him.

Bonus points

- Matteo gave five points to Filip
- Žanamari gave five points to Damir
- Ana Maras gave five points to Hana
- Lana gave five points to Filip
- Hana gave five points to Filip
- Filip gave five points to Fil
- Damir gave five points to Lana
- Fil gave five points to Filip

== Week 12 ==
Guest Judge: Mario Petreković
Aired: December 11, 2016
Winner: Matteo Cetinski

Order	Celebrity	Performing as	Song	Points (judges and contestants)					Total	Result
Order	Celebrity	Performing as	Song	Goran	Sandra	Tomo	Mario	Bonus	Total	Result
1	Ana Maras Harmander	Meghan Trainor	"No"	7	5	6	4	0	22	6th
2	Fil Tilen	Rick James	"Super Freak"	9	12	10	9	5	45	2nd
3	Žanamari Perčić	Bruno Mars	"Locked Out Of Heaven"	4	6	7	5	0	22	6th
4	Damir Kedžo	Lady Gaga	"Paparazzi"	5	7	5	7	15	39	4th
5	Matteo Cetinski	Majke	"Teške boje"	12	10	12	10	15	59	1st
6	Hana Hegedušić	Wham!	"Wake Me Up Before You Go-Go"	6	4	4	6	0	20	8th
7	Lana Jurčević	Beyoncé	"Run The World (Girls)"	10	9	9	12	5	45	2nd
8	Filip Dizdar	Vinko Coce	"Vilo moja"	8	8	8	8	0	32	5th

Bonus points

- Ana Maras gave five points to Damir
- Fil gave five points to Matteo
- Žanamari gave five points to Matteo
- Damir gave five points to Matteo
- Matteo gave five points to Fil
- Hana gave five points to Damir
- Lana gave five points to Damir
- Filip gave five points to Lana

== Week 13 - Final ==
Guest Judge: Petar Grašo
Aired: December 18, 2016
Winner: Damir Kedžo

Order	Celebrity	Performing as	Song	Points (starting, judges, contestants)						Total	Result
Order	Celebrity	Performing as	Song	Starting	Goran	Sandra	Tomo	Petar	Bonus	Total	Result
1	Matteo Cetinski	Elvis Presley	"Viva Las Vegas"	4	12	10	9	8	0	43	4th
2	Damir Kedžo	Mariah Carey	"All I Want For Christmas Is You"	5	8	12	10	9	20	64	1st
3	Lana Jurčević	Siniša Vuco	"Volim piti i ljubiti"	6	9	8	12	10	10	55	3rd
4	Ana Maras Harmander	Sophia Loren	"Mambo Italiano"	7	10	9	8	12	10	56	2nd
5	Žanamari Perčić	Magazin	"Nostalgija"	Not competing							7th
5	Filip Dizdar	Lidija Horvat-Dunjko	"Nostalgija"	Not competing							5th
6	Fil Tilen	Romina Power	"Felicità"	Not competing							8th
6	Hana Hegedušić	Al Bano	"Felicità"	Not competing							6th

Bonus points

- Matteo gave five points to Lana
- Damir gave five points to Ana Maras
- Lana gave five points to Ana Maras
- Ana Maras gave five points to Damir
- Žanamari gave five points to Damir
- Filip gave five points to Damir
- Fil gave five points to Lana
- Hana gave five points to Damir

== See also ==
- Tvoje lice zvuči poznato (Croatian season 1)
- Tvoje lice zvuči poznato (Croatian season 2)
- Tvoje lice zvuči poznato (Croatian season 4)
- Tvoje lice zvuči poznato (Croatian season 5)
