= Tvoje lice zvuči poznato =

Tvoje lice zvuči poznato may refer to:

== Croatian TV Show ==
- Tvoje lice zvuči poznato (Croatian TV series), Croatian version of the show Your Face Sounds Familiar
  - Tvoje lice zvuči poznato (Croatian season 1), the first season of the Croatian version of the show Your Face Sounds Familiar
  - Tvoje lice zvuči poznato (Croatian season 2), the second season of the Croatian version of the show Your Face Sounds Familiar
  - Tvoje lice zvuči poznato (Croatian season 3), the third season of the Croatian version of the show Your Face Sounds Familiar
  - Tvoje lice zvuči poznato (Croatian season 4), the fourth season of the Croatian version of the show Your Face Sounds Familiar

== Serbian TV Show ==
- Tvoje lice zvuči poznato (Serbian TV series), Serbian version of the show Your Face Sounds Familiar
  - Tvoje lice zvuči poznato (Serbian season 1), the first season of the Serbian version of the show Your Face Sounds Familiar
  - Tvoje lice zvuči poznato (Serbian season 2), the second season of the Serbian version of the show Your Face Sounds Familiar
  - Tvoje lice zvuči poznato (Serbian season 3), the third season of the Serbian version of the show Your Face Sounds Familiar
  - Tvoje lice zvuči poznato (Serbian season 4), the fourth season of the Serbian version of the show Your Face Sounds Familiar
