= Moja domovina =

Croatian patriotic song

Song by Hrvatski Band Aid
- Released: 15 September 1991
- Songwriters: Zrinko Tutić; Rajko Dujmić

"Moja domovina" (Croatian for 'My Homeland') is a Croatian patriotic song originally recorded in 1991 as a charity single by a supergroup called Hrvatski Band Aid (Croatian Band Aid) featuring a number of prominent local musicians from all musical genres. The authors of the music and lyrics are Zrinko Tutić and Rajko Dujmić. The song was arranged by Nikša Bratoš, while the instrumental solos were composed by Damir Lipošek, Vedran Božić, and Husein Hasanefendić.

The song was released in the initial stages of the 1991–95 Croatian War of Independence and was first aired on 15 September 1991 on the public television broadcaster HRT, after the evening news programme Dnevnik.

== Background ==
Apart from its humanitarian purpose, the group was significant in that it marked the beginning of an independent Croatian music scene and the end of the Yugoslavian music scene. Among those groups who adopted a firm Croatian identity and participated in the single were Film, Novi fosili, Magazin, Parni Valjak, Psihomodo Pop, and Prljavo Kazalište.

Despite the time which has passed since the song's first release, its popularity hasn't diminished through the years. During the Croatian War of Independence, it was often played to boost morale either among soldiers on the battlefield or civilians in their shelters. In recent times, the song is usually sung during important sports events and represents a symbol of unity and pride. According to numerous surveys, "Moja domovina" is the most popular patriotic song among Croatian citizens ever written.

== List of performers (Croatian Band Aid) ==
- Ivo Amulić
- Mladen Bodalec
- Dalibor Brun
- Meri Cetinić
- Đuka Čaić
- Arsen Dedić
- Ljupka Dimitrovska
- Sanja Doležal
- Oliver Dragojević
- Doris Dragović
- Dino Dvornik
- Davor Gobac
- Milo Hrnić
- Matko Jelavić
- Vlado Kalember
- Tereza Kesovija
- Emilija Kokić
- Zorica Kondža
- Mišo Kovač
- Josipa Lisac
- Danijela Martinović
- Tatjana Matejaš
- Dragutin Mlinarec
- Ljiljana Nikolovska
- Gabi Novak
- Boris Novković
- Aki Rahimovski
- Ivo Robić
- Krunoslav Slabinac
- Jasmin Stavros
- Jura Stublić
- Stanko Šarić
- Ivica Šerfezi
- Zdravko Škender
- Zvonko Špišić
- Severina Vučković
- Zdenka Vučković
- Jasna Zlokić

== Lyrics ==
Croatian	English translation	English version ("My homeland")
Svakog dana mislim na tebe Slušam vijesti, brojim korake Nemir je u srcima, a ljubav u nama Ima samo jedna istina Svaka zvijezda sija za tebe Kamen puca, pjesma putuje Tisuću generacija noćas ne spava Cijeli svijet je sada sa nama! (Sa nama!) Moja domovina, moja domovina, Ima snagu zlatnog žita, Ima oči boje mora, Moja zemlja Hrvatska. Vratit ću se moram doći, tu je moj dom, Moje sunce, moje nebo. Novi dan se budi kao sreća osvaja Ti si tu sa nama (Sa nama!)	Every day I think about you I listen to the news, I count my steps Restlessness is in our hearts, but love is in us There is only one truth Every star is shining for you Rocks are breaking, the song is traveling Thousands of generations are not sleeping tonight The whole world is now with us! (With us!) My homeland, my homeland Has the strength of golden wheat Has the eyes the color of the sea My country Croatia I will return, I have to come, this is my home My sun, my sky A new day is awakening, conquers like happiness You are here, with us! (With us!)	Everywhere I go you're in my mind, Anywhere I stay you're in my heart, You to me are everything, the sweetest song to sing You're my old star til the end of time. Even if I'm half a world away, A part of me is with you as I pray. The stars are shining just for you, the sky is always blue, Mother country let God be with you! (Be with you!) My Croatia, my home, my Croatia, my home, Golden valleys, silent seas, Silver islands, olive trees, My Croatia, my homeland. As the child of generations this is my land Where I was born, where I'll die For the children of my children this is my land Where I was born, where I will die (I will die!)
