= Tvoje lice zvuči poznato (Croatian TV series) season 1 =

Tvoje lice zvuči poznato
- Season 1
- No. of episodes: 12

Release
- Original network: NovaTV
- Original release: 11 October – 21 December 2014

Season chronology
- Next → Season 2

Tvoje lice zvuči poznato is the Croatian version of Your Face Sounds Familiar. It started on 5 October 2014. There are four judges in season one, Goran Navojec (actor), Sandra Bagarić (opera singer), Tomo in der Mühlen (music producer & DJ) and different guest judges in every episode. The winner is Mario Petreković, and the runner-up is Vanda Winter.

== Format ==
The show challenges celebrities (singers and actors) to perform as different iconic music artists every week, which are chosen by the show's "Randomiser". They are then judged by the panel of celebrity judges including Goran Navojec, Sandra Bagarić and Tomo in der Mühlen. Each week, one celebrity guest judge joins Goran, Sandra and Tomo to make up the complete judging panel. Sandra Bagarić is also a voice coach and act coach. Tomo in der Mühlen is the Executive Music Producer of the show. Each celebrity gets transformed into a different singer each week, and performs an iconic song and dance routine well known by that particular singer. The 'randomiser' can choose any older or younger artist available in the machine, or even a singer of the opposite sex, or a deceased singer. Winner of each episode wins 10 000 HRK, and winner of whole show wins 40 000 HRK. All money goes to charity of winner's own choice. The show lasts 12 weeks.

=== Voting ===
The contestants are awarded points from the judges (and each other) based on their singing and dance routines. Judges give points from 4 to 12, with the exception of 11. After that, each contestant gives 5 points to a fellow contestant of their choice (known as "Bonus" points). In week 11 (semi-final week), four contestants with the highest number of votes will qualify to the final. In week 12 (grand final), previous points will be transformed into 4-7 system, jury will give the points from 8 to 12, and contestants will give 5 points to a fellow contestant of their choice.

=== Judges ===
- Goran Navojec - Croatian actor, known for many roles on television series and in feature films.
- Sandra Bagarić - Croatian opera singer
- Tomo in der Mühlen - German-born music producer and DJ based in New York City and Zagreb.

=== Guest member ===
- Mislav Čavajda (Week 1)
- Joško Čagalj - Jole (Week 2)
- Boris Đurđević (Week 3)
- Nina Badrić (Week 4)
- Enis Bešlagić (Week 5)
- Indira Levak (Week 6)
- Emilija Kokić (Week 7)
- Jelena Rozga (Week 8)
- Luka Nižetić (Week 9)
- Tonči Huljić (Week 10)
- Nives Celsius (Week 11)
- Severina (Week 12)

== Contestants ==
Celebrity	Week 1	Week 2	Week 3	Week 4	Week 5	Week 6	Week 7	Week 8	Week 9	Week 10	Semi	Final	Total
Mario Petreković	37	58	34	43	58	37	19	38	54	73	31	Winner	482 (12)
Vanda Winter	36	16	71	31	39	66	48	29	30	30	42	Runner-up	438 (10)
Baby Dooks	45	24	44	20	34	16	33	79	64	33	32	4th	424 (9)
Giuliano	25	53	31	57	23	43	18	22	32	29	66	3rd	399 (8)
Minea	63	29	39	30	18	24	50	28	23	36	41	X	381 (7)
Andrea Andrassy	33	20	25	24	65	24	54	41	28	23	31	X	368 (6)
Jasna Palić Picukarić	22	48	18	31	25	41	38	23	36	24	25	X	331 (5)
Ronald Braus	23	36	22	48	22	33	24	24	17	36	16	X	301 (4)

Color key:

indicates the winning contestant that week
indicates the contestant with fewest points that week
indicates the eliminated contestant
indicates the series winner
indicates the series runner-up

== Performance chart ==
Contestant	Week 1	Week 2	Week 3	Week 4	Week 5	Week 6	Week 7	Week 8	Week 9	Week 10	Week 11	Final
Mario Petreković	Mrle (Let 3)	Beyoncé	Jim Morrison (The Doors)	Dino Dvornik	Tina Turner	Ricky Martin	Doris Dragović	Andrea Bocelli	Alka Vuica	Lionel Richie	Adam Levine (Maroon 5)	Bruno Mars
Vanda Winter	Britney Spears	Zdravko Čolić	Florence Welch (Florence and the Machine)	Nina Badrić	Stevie Wonder	Axl Rose (Guns N' Roses)	Loreen	Cyndi Lauper	Vanna (Electro Team)	Loalwa Braz (Kaoma)	Enrique Iglesias	Rihanna
Giuliano	Mišo Kovač	Amy Winehouse	Željko Bebek (Bijelo Dugme)	Freddie Mercury (Queen)	Neda Ukraden	Mick Jagger (The Rolling Stones)	Emilija Kokić (Riva)	Jon Bon Jovi (Bon Jovi)	Tarkan	Josipa Lisac	Lou Bega	Lenny Kravitz
Baby Dooks	Joe Cocker	Marina Perazić (Denis & Denis)	PSY	Jasenko Houra (Prljavo Kazalište)	Halid Bešlić	Branko Bubica (Klapa Maslina)	Daniel Popović	Esma Redžepova	James Brown	Nicolas Reyes (Gipsy Kings)	Andre 3000 (Outkast)	Katy Perry
Minea	Joško Čagalj Jole	Nancy Sinatra	MC Hammer	Kylie Minogue	Boy George (Culture Club)	Siniša Vuco	Ruslana	Billy Idol	Luka Nižetić	Jennifer Lopez	Cher	Wham! (George Michael)
Andrea Andrassy	Lana Del Rey	Oliver Dragojević	Kasandra	Tony Cetinski	Shakira	Senna M	Severina	Michael Jackson	Giuliano	Gusttavo Lima	Lady Gaga	Wham! (Andrew Ridgeley)
Jasna Palić Picukarić	Dolly Parton	Jessica Rabbit	Davor Gobac (Psihomodo Pop)	Madonna	Zlatko Pejaković	Pharrell Williams	Tajči	Jelena Rozga	Janne Ericsson (Rednex)	Ljiljana Nikolovska (Magazin)	Danijela Martinović	Ivana Banfić
Ronald Braus	Tom Jones	Robbie Williams	Indira Levak (Colonia)	Ivo Robić & Zdenka Vučković	Aki Rahimovski (Parni Valjak)	Jasmin Stavros	Sanja Doležal (Novi Fosili)	Tereza Kesovija	Raffaella Carra	Zvonko Bogdan	Vlado Kalember	Dino Merlin

Color key:

indicates the contestant came first that week
indicates the contestant came second that week
indicates the contestant came last that week

== Week 1 ==
Guest Judge: Mislav Čavajda
Aired: 5 October 2014
Winner: Minea

Order	Celebrity	Performing as	Song	Points (judges and contestants)					Total	Result
Order	Celebrity	Performing as	Song	Goran	Sandra	Tomo	Mislav	Bonus	Total	Result
1	Giuliano	Mišo Kovač	"Dalmacija u mom oku"	4	5	6	5	5	25	6th
2	Jasna Palić Picukarić	Dolly Parton	"Jolene"	5	6	5	6	-	22	8th
3	Mario Petreković	Let 3	"Profesor Jakov"	10	7	7	8	10	42	3rd
4	Andrea Andrassy	Lana Del Rey	"Born to Die"	7	10	9	7	-	33	5th
5	Baby Dooks	Joe Cocker	"You Can Leave Your Hat On"	9	9	12	10	5	45	2nd
6	Minea	Jole	"Nosi mi se bijela boja"	12	12	10	9	5	48	1st
7	Ronald Braus	Tom Jones	"Delilah"	6	4	4	4	5	23	7th
8	Vanda Winter	Britney Spears	"...Baby One More Time"	8	8	8	12		36	4th

Bonus points

- Giuliano gave five points to Mario
- Jasna gave five points to Giuliano
- Mario gave five points to Baby Dooks
- Andrea gave five points to Andrea
- Baby Dooks gave five points to Vanda
- Minea gave five points to Ronald
- Ronald gave five points to Jasna
- Vanda gave five points to Minea

== Week 2 ==
Guest Judge: Joško Čagalj - Jole
Aired: 12 October 2014
Winner: Mario Petreković

Order	Celebrity	Performing as	Song	Points (judges and contestants)					Total	Result
Order	Celebrity	Performing as	Song	Goran	Sandra	Tomo	Jole	Bonus	Total	Result
1	Vanda Winter	Zdravko Čolić	"Pjevam danju, pjevam noću"	4	4	4	4	5	21	8th
2	Giuliano	Amy Winehouse	"Rehab"	12	12	12	12	5	53	1st
3	Ronald Braus	Robbie Williams	"Let Me Entertain You"	8	9	10	9	5	41	3rd
4	Baby Dooks	Denis & Denis	"Program tvog kompjutera"	6	6	6	6	5	29	6th
5	Andrea Andrassy	Oliver Dragojević	"Što učinila si ti"	5	5	5	5	5	25	7th
6	Jasna Palić Picukarić	Jessica Rabbit	"Why Don't You Do Right?"	10	10	8	10	5	43	2nd
7	Minea	Nancy Sinatra	"These Boots Are Made for Walkin'"	7	7	7	8	5	34	5th
8	Mario Petreković	Beyoncé	"Single Ladies (Put a Ring on It)"	9	8	9	7	5	38	4th

Bonus points

- Vanda gave five points to Mario
- Giuliano gave five points to Jasna
- Ronald gave five points to Jasna
- Baby Dooks gave five points to Mario
- Andrea gave five points to Mario
- Jasna gave five points to Mario
- Minea gave five points to Mario
- Mario gave five points to Giuliano

== Week 3 ==
Guest Judge: Boris Đurđević
Aired: 19 October 2014
Winner: Vanda Winter

Order	Celebrity	Performing as	Song	Points (judges and contestants)					Total	Result
Order	Celebrity	Performing as	Song	Goran	Sandra	Tomo	Boris	Bonus	Total	Result
1	Ronald Braus	Colonia	"Tako ti je mali moj"	4	5	5	8	5	27	7th
2	Giuliano	Željko Bebek	"Da je sreće bilo"	7	7	6	6	5	31	5th
3	Jasna Palić Picukarić	Psihomodo Pop	"Donna"	6	4	4	4	5	23	8th
4	Baby Dooks	PSY	"Gangnam Style"	9	9	9	12	5	44	2nd-3rd
5	Mario Petreković	Jim Morrison	"Touch Me"	8	8	8	5	5	34	4th
6	Andrea Andrassy	Kasandra	"Sladoled"	5	6	7	7	5	30	6th
7	Vanda Winter	Florence and the Machine	"You've Got the Love"	12	12	12	10	5	51	1st
8	Minea	MC Hammer	"U Can't Touch This"	10	10	10	9	5	44	2nd-3rd

Bonus points

- Ronald gave five points to Giuliano
- Giuliano gave five points to Vanda
- Jasna gave five points to Baby Dooks
- Baby Dooks gave five points to Vanda
- Mario gave five points to Vanda
- Andrea gave five points to Vanda
- Vanda gave five points to Mario
- Minea gave five points to Vanda

== Week 4 ==
Guest Judge: Nina Badrić
Aired: 26 October 2014
Winner: Giuliano

Order	Celebrity	Performing as	Song	Points (judges and contestants)					Total	Result
Order	Celebrity	Performing as	Song	Goran	Sandra	Tomo	Nina	Bonus	Total	Result
1	Jasna Palić Picukarić	Madonna	"Vogue"	6	5	6	4	5	26	6th
2	Mario Petreković	Dino Dvornik	"Hipnotiziran"	8	9	9	12	5	43	3rd
3	Minea	Kylie Minogue	"Can't Get You Out of My Head"	7	8	7	8	5	35	5th
4	Andrea Andrassy	Tony Cetinski	"Nek' ti bude ljubav sva"	4	6	4	5	5	24	8th
5	Vanda Winter	Nina Badrić	"Moje oči pune ljubavi"	9	7	8	7	5	36	4th
6	Baby Dooks	Jasenko Houra	"Heroj ulice"	5	4	5	6	5	25	7th
7	Ronald Braus	Ivo Robić	"Mala djevojčica"	10	12	12	9	5	48	1st
7	Ronald Braus	Zdenka Vučković	"Mala djevojčica"	10	12	12	9	5	48	1st
8	Giuliano	Freddie Mercury	"I Want to Break Free"	12	10	10	10	15	57	2nd

Bonus points

- Jasna gave five points to Ronald
- Mario gave five points to Giuliano
- Minea gave five points to Giuliano
- Andrea gave five points to Giuliano
- Vanda gave five points to Jasna
- Baby Dooks gave five points to Andrea
- Ronald gave five points to Jasna
- Giuliano gave five points to Mario

== Week 5 ==
Guest Judge: Enis Bešlagić
Aired: 2 November 2014
Winner: Andrea Andrassy

Order	Celebrity	Performing as	Song	Points (judges and contestants)					Total	Result
Order	Celebrity	Performing as	Song	Goran	Sandra	Tomo	Enis	Bonus	Total	Result
1	Minea	Boy George	"Karma Chameleon"	4	4	4	6	5	23	8th
2	Baby Dooks	Halid Bešlić	"Miljacka"	9	8	9	8	5	39	3rd-4th
3	Mario Petreković	Tina Turner	"Proud Mary"	12	12	12	12	5	53	1st
4	Ronald Braus	Aki Rahimovski	"Ugasi me"	5	7	6	4	5	27	7th
5	Jasna Palić Picukarić	Zlatko Pejaković	"Misli svatko da je meni lako"	7	6	5	7	5	30	5th
6	Andrea Andrassy	Shakira	"Waka Waka"	10	10	10	10	5	45	2nd
7	Giuliano	Neda Ukraden	"Da se nađemo na pola puta"	6	5	7	5	5	28	6th
8	Vanda Winter	Stevie Wonder	"I Just Called to Say I Love You"	8	9	8	9	5	39	3rd-4th

Bonus points

- Minea gave five points to Andrea
- Baby Dooks gave five points to Giuliano
- Mario gave five points to Minea
- Ronald gave five points to Mario
- Jasna gave five points to Jasna
- Andrea gave five points to Ronald
- Giuliano gave five points to Vanda
- Vanda gave five points to Baby Dooks

== Week 6 ==
Guest Judge: Indira Levak
Aired: 9 November 2014
Winner: Vanda Winter

Order	Celebrity	Performing as	Song	Points (judges and contestants)					Total	Result
Order	Celebrity	Performing as	Song	Goran	Sandra	Tomo	Indira	Bonus	Total	Result
1	Vanda Winter	Guns N' Roses	"Sweet Child o' Mine"	12	12	12	10	5	51	1st
2	Ronald Braus	Jasmin Stavros	"Umoran"	6	10	7	5	5	33	5th
3	Mario Petreković	Ricky Martin	"Livin' la Vida Loca"	10	6	9	12	5	42	2nd
4	Baby Dooks	Klapa Maslina	"Da te mogu pismom zvati"	4	4	4	4	5	21	8th
5	Andrea Andrassy	Senna M	"Beba malena"	5	7	6	6	5	29	6th-7th
6	Giuliano	Mick Jagger	"Satisfaction"	8	9	8	8	5	38	4th
7	Minea	Siniša Vuco	"Crna ženo"	7	5	5	7	5	29	6th-7th
8	Jasna Palić Picukarić	Pharrell Williams	"Happy"	9	8	10	9	5	41	3rd

Bonus points

- Vanda gave five points to Giuliano
- Ronald gave five points to Vanda
- Mario gave five points to Minea
- Baby Dooks gave five points to Mario
- Andrea gave five points to Andrea
- Giuliano gave five points to Ronald
- Minea gave five points to Jasna
- Jasna gave five points to Baby Dooks

== Week 7 ==
Guest Judge: Emilija Kokić
Aired: 16 November 2014
Winner: Andrea Andrassy

Order	Celebrity	Performing as	Song	Points (judges and contestants)					Total	Result
Order	Celebrity	Performing as	Song	Goran	Sandra	Tomo	Emilija	Bonus	Total	Result
1	Ronald Braus	Novi fosili	"Ja sam za ples"	5	7	6	6	5	29	6th
2	Minea	Ruslana	"Wild Dances"	9	8	8	10	5	40	3rd
3	Jasna Palić Picukarić	Tajči	"Hajde da ludujemo"	7	9	9	8	5	38	4th
4	Baby Dooks	Daniel Popović	"Džuli"	8	6	7	7	5	33	5th
5	Giuliano	Riva	"Rock Me"	4	5	5	4	5	23	8th
6	Vanda Winter	Loreen	"Euphoria"	12	12	12	12	5	53	1st
7	Mario Petreković	Doris Dragović	"Marija Magdalena"	6	4	4	5	5	24	7th
8	Andrea Andrassy	Severina	"Moja štikla"	10	10	10	9	5	44	2nd

Bonus points

- Ronald gave five points to Minea
- Minea gave five points to Baby Dooks
- Jasna gave five points to Vanda
- Baby Dooks gave five points to Andrea
- Giuliano gave five points to Mario
- Vanda gave five points to Giuliano
- Mario gave five points to Ronald
- Andrea gave five points to Jasna

== Week 8 ==
Guest Judge: Jelena Rozga
Aired: 23 November 2014
Winner: Baby Dooks

Order	Celebrity	Performing as	Song	Points (judges and contestants)					Total	Result
Order	Celebrity	Performing as	Song	Goran	Sandra	Tomo	Jelena	Bonus	Total	Result
1	Vanda Winter	Cyndi Lauper	"Girls Just Want to Have Fun"	6	7	9	7	5	34	4th
2	Giuliano	Bon Jovi	"It's My Life"	5	5	7	5	5	27	7th
3	Jasna Palić Picukarić	Jelena Rozga	"Bižuterija"	4	4	4	6	5	23	8th
4	Andrea Andrassy	Michael Jackson	"Bad"	12	10	10	9	5	46	2nd
5	Mario Petreković	Andrea Bocelli	"Con te partirò"	9	9	8	12	5	43	3rd
6	Baby Dooks	Esma Redžepova	"Čaje šukarije"	10	12	12	10	5	49	1st
7	Minea	Billy Idol	"Dancing with Myself"	8	6	6	8	5	33	5th
8	Ronald Braus	Tereza Kesovija	"Prijatelji stari gdje ste"	7	8	5	4	5	29	6th

Bonus points

- Vanda gave five points to Baby Dooks
- Giuliano gave five points to Vanda
- Jasna gave five points to Mario
- Andrea gave five points to Giuliano
- Mario gave five points to Andrea
- Baby Dooks gave five points to Jasna
- Minea gave five points to Minea
- Ronald gave five points to Ronald

== Week 9 ==
Guest Judge: Luka Nižetić
Aired: 30 November 2014
Winner: Baby Dooks

Order	Celebrity	Performing as	Song	Points (judges and contestants)					Total	Result
Order	Celebrity	Performing as	Song	Goran	Sandra	Tomo	Luka	Bonus	Total	Result
1	Minea	Luka Nižetić	"Proljeće"	5	5	4	9	5	28	7th
2	Vanda Winter	ET	"Tek je 12 sati"	7	7	8	8	5	35	4th
3	Ronald Braus	Raffaella Carrà	"A far l'amore comincia tu"	4	4	5	4	5	22	8th
4	Mario Petreković	Alka Vuica	"Laži me"	12	10	10	12	5	49	1st
5	Giuliano	Tarkan	"Şımarık"	6	9	7	5	5	32	6th
6	Baby Dooks	James Brown	"I Feel Good"	10	12	12	10	5	49	1st
7	Andrea Andrassy	Giuliano	"Srna i vuk"	9	6	6	7	5	33	5th
8	Jasna Palić Picukarić	Rednex	"Cotton Eye Joe"	8	8	9	6	5	36	3rd

Bonus points

- Minea gave five points to Baby Dooks
- Vanda gave five points to Jasna
- Ronald gave five points to Mario
- Mario gave five points to Giuliano
- Giuliano gave five points to Vanda
- Baby Dooks gave five points to Ronald
- Andrea gave five points to Minea
- Jasna gave five points to Andrea

== Week 10 ==
Guest Judge: Tonči Huljić
Aired: 7 December 2014
Winner: Mario Petreković

Order	Celebrity	Performing as	Song	Points (judges and contestants)					Total	Result
Order	Celebrity	Performing as	Song	Goran	Sandra	Tomo	Tonči	Bonus	Total	Result
1	Andrea Andrassy	Gusttavo Lima	"Balada"	5	5	5	8	5	28	8th
2	Jasna Palić Picukarić	Magazin	"Kokolo"	4	4	4	12	5	29	6th-7th
3	Vanda Winter	Kaoma	"Lambada"	6	7	8	9	5	35	5th
4	Baby Dooks	Gipsy Kings	"Volare"	9	8	10	6	5	38	3rd
5	Ronald Braus	Zvonko Bogdan	"Evo banke, cigane moj"	10	10	7	4	5	36	4th
6	Mario Petreković	Lionel Richie	"All Night Long"	12	12	12	7	5	48	1st
7	Giuliano	Josipa Lisac	"Magla"	7	6	6	5	5	29	6th-7th
8	Minea	Jennifer Lopez	"Let's Get Loud"	8	9	9	10	5	41	2nd

Bonus points

- Andrea gave five points to Mario
- Jasna gave five points to Mario
- Vanda gave five points to Mario
- Baby Dooks gave five points to Ronald
- Ronald gave five points to Mario
- Mario gave five points to Giuliano
- Giuliano gave five points to Mario
- Minea gave five points to Mario

== Week 11 ==
=== Semi-final ===
Guest Judge: Nives Celsius
Aired: 14 December 2014
Winner: Giuliano

Order	Celebrity	Performing as	Song	Points (judges and contestants)					Total	Result
Order	Celebrity	Performing as	Song	Goran	Sandra	Tomo	Nives	Bonus	Total	Result
1	Mario Petreković	Maroon 5	"Moves Like Jagger"	9	7	7	8	5	36	4th-6th
2	Minea	Cher	"If I Could Turn Back Time"	6	8	6	6	5	36	4th-6th
3	Ronald Braus	Vlado Kalember	"Evo noći, evo ludila"	4	4	4	4	5	21	8th
4	Vanda Winter	Enrique Iglesias	"Bailamos"	10	12	10	10	5	47	2nd
5	Baby Dooks	Outkast	"Hey Ya!"	8	6	9	9	5	37	3rd
6	Jasna Palić Picukarić	Danijela Martinović	"Brodolom"	5	5	5	5	5	25	7th
7	Andrea Andrassy	Lady Gaga	"Poker Face"	7	9	8	7	5	36	4th-6th
8	Giuliano	Lou Bega	"Mambo No. 5"	12	10	12	12	5	51	1st

Bonus points

- Mario gave ten points to Minea
- Minea gave ten points to Giuliano
- Ronald gave five points to Jasna
- Vanda gave five points to Baby Dooks
- Baby Dooks gave five points to Vanda
- Jasna gave five points to Andrea
- Andrea gave five points to Ronald
- Giuliano gave five points to Mario

== Week 12 ==
=== Final ===
Guest Judge: Severina
Aired: 21 December 2014
Winner: Mario Petreković

Order	Celebrity	Performing as	Song	Points (previous points, judges and contestants)						Total	Result
Order	Celebrity	Performing as	Song	Previous	Goran	Sandra	Tomo	Severina	Bonus	Total	Result
1	Giuliano	Lenny Kravitz	"Are You Gonna Go My Way"	4	10	9	8	10	5	46	4th Place
2	Vanda Winter	Rihanna	"S&M"	6	9	10	9	12	5	51	3rd Place
3	Baby Dooks	Katy Perry	"California Gurls"	5	8	8	10	9	15	60	2nd Place
4	Mario Petreković	Bruno Mars	"Treasure"	7	12	12	12	8	15	66	Series winner

Interval acts

Celebrities	Performing as	Song
Jasna Palić Picukarić and Ronald Braus	Dino Merlin and Ivana Banfić	"Godinama"
Andrea Andrassy and Minea	Wham!	"Last Christmas"

Bonus points

- Ronald and Jasna gave five points to Mario
- Andrea and Minea gave ten points to Mario
- Giuliano gave five points to Baby Dooks
- Vanda gave ten points to Baby Dooks
- Baby Dooks gave five points to Giuliano
- Mario gave five points to Vanda

== See also ==
- Tvoje lice zvuči poznato (Croatian season 2)
- Tvoje lice zvuči poznato (Croatian season 3)
- Tvoje lice zvuči poznato (Croatian season 4)
- Tvoje lice zvuči poznato (Croatian season 5)
