= Tvoje lice zvuči poznato season 1 =

Tvoje lice zvuči poznato (season 1) may refer to:

- Tvoje lice zvuči poznato (Croatian season 1), the first season of the Croatian version of the show Your Face Sounds Familiar
- Tvoje lice zvuči poznato (Serbian season 1), the first season of the Serbian version of the show Your Face Sounds Familiar
