= Tvoje lice zvuči poznato season 2 =

Tvoje lice zvuči poznato (season 2) may refer to:

- Tvoje lice zvuči poznato (Croatian season 2), the second season of the Croatian version of the show Your Face Sounds Familiar
- Tvoje lice zvuči poznato (Serbian season 2), the second season of the Serbian version of the show Your Face Sounds Familiar
