= Zorica Kondža =

Croatian pop singer (born 1960)

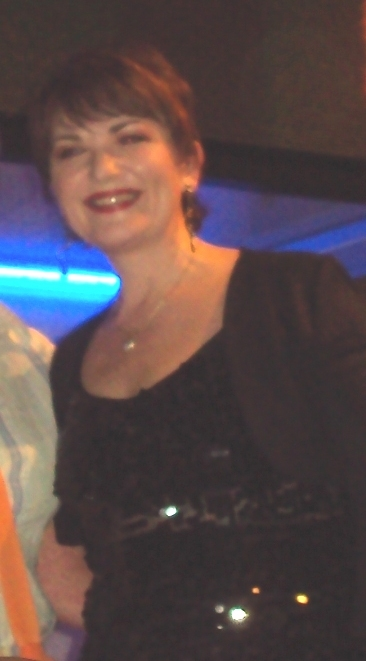

Background information
- Born: 25 June 1960 (age 66); Split, PR Croatia, FPR Yugoslavia
- Genres: Pop music, pop-rock
- Occupation: Singer
- Years active: 1981–present
- Formerly of: Stijene

Zorica Kondža (born 25 June 1960) is a Croatian pop-rock singer. She is best known for her soprano vocal range, which she displayed as the lead vocalist for the 1980s pop-rock music act Stijene. Since 1981, she had participated in most of the Split Festivals until 2014, which she had won 7 times. Other than the Split festivals, she also took part in various other jamborees in Croatia, such as the Zadarfest, Dora and Mesam. She began her solo career in 1984, which gained her success in Croatia and neighbouring countries.

== Early life ==
Kondža was born in Split. Soon after her birth, the family relocated to Kaštel Sućurac, where she spent most of her childhood. In her youth, she didn't originally develop a passion for singing, rather acting. Even though she didn't want to pursue a music career, she preferred singing, and was originally influenced by American jazz and RnB musicians, such as Louis Armstrong, Billie Holiday, Otis Redding, Sam Cooke, Ray Charles, Bobby Blue Bland, Aretha Franklin, Ella Fitzgerald, and Aaron Neville.

== Career ==
=== Early beginnings: Stijene, Split Festival (1981–1984) ===
In the late 1970s she provided backing vocals for many famous singers from Split, such as Oliver Dragojević and Mišo Kovač. In 1981, she began performing as the lead vocalist for various Dalmatian groups, such as Pirati, Novi Dani, More, and ST. Her most notable project Stijene gained her notoriety in Dalmatia. The group was based in Klis, where they recorded 4 albums (Cementna prašina (Cemented Dust, 1981.), Jedanaest i petnaest (Eleven and fifteen, 1982.), Balkanska korida (Balkan Bullfight, 1983.), and Zlatna kolekcija (The Golden Collection, 1984.).

In 1981, the band performed on the Split Festival, with the song Ja sam more, ti si rijeka (I'm the sea, you're the river). Even though the song wasn't successful on the contest itself, the song became a hit in the country. It was in 1982 when Stijene won the competition with their most popular song Ima jedan svijet (There's one world) that they achieved nationwide recognition. Their winning song outshined the rest of their repertoire and it became their signature song.

=== Split Festival, Mesam, Jugovizija, Dora and other ventures (1984–1993) ===
Kondža introduced herself as a single performer on yet another Split Festival in 1984, with the song Nakon dugih milja (After long miles). The same year, she performed with the children's choir Sredlice on the Split Festival with the song Djevojka s kapok na glavim (The girl with a hat on her head). In 1985, she won the Split Festival with the song Pokora (Penance), and reached 13th place on Mesam with the song Dovoljna je ljubav (Love is enough). At the time she started collaborating with composer Zdenko Runjić. The following year she achieved 1st place yet again with Vrijeme ljubavi (Time of love). In 1989, for the composition of Daj mi sunca (Give me sunshine) she won the award for the best interpretation. In 1990, alongside her colleague Oliver Dragojević, Kondža performed Sreca je tamo gdje si ti (Happiness is where you are) on Jugovizija, where the duo reached 3rd place. The next year Kondža and Dragojević also provided vocals for the Croatian patriotic song Moja domovina (My homeland), alongside other musicians and recording artists of Croatian descent.

=== Recent years (1993-present) ===
In 2001, she released an album called Hodajmo po zvijezdama (Let's walk on the stars) which features the hit singles Zar je voljeti grijeh (Is loving a sin) and Tako lako (So easy).

In 2017, she was a guest judge on an episode of Tvoje lice zvuči poznato.

In the summer of 2018 she held numerous concerts in Croatia with a mostly rock repertoire.

== Music style ==
Kondža is widely known for her vocal abilities and soprano range. Her music is heavily influenced by Dalmatian folk music, thus she frequently sings in the Dalmatian dialect.

== Private life ==
Kondža married Joško Banov and has three sons (Toni, Ivan, Luka). She resides in Split.

She is a devout Roman Catholic. Kondža stated that her Catholic faith helps her in life.

== Awards and nominations ==
=== Porin ===
Year	Category	Performer / Work	Result	Ref.
1994	Best Female Vocal Performance	Molitva za tebe	Nominated	
2002	Best Female Vocal Performance	Hodajmo po zvijezdama	Nominated	
2007	Best Female Vocal Performance	Zauvijek	Nominated	
2024	Best Female Vocal Performance	Nemirno srce	Nominated	
2017	Best Concert Album	Live Lisinski	Nominated	

== Festivals ==
Split Festival

- 1981. – "Ja sam more, ti si rijeka" (as the vocalist for "Stijene")
- 1982. – "Ima jedan svijet" (as the vocalist for "Stijene") – 1st place
- 1984. – "Nakon dugih milja"
- 1984. – "Djevojke s kapom na glavi" (with the children's choir "Srdelice")
- 1985. – "Pokora" – 1st place
- 1985. – "Slobodo naša"
- 1986. – "Vrijeme ljubavi" – 1st place
- 1986. – "Dodji kao prijatelj"
- 1986. – "Grišnica"
- 1988. – "Zbog tvoje ljubavi"
- 1988. – "Oda"
- 1989. – "Daj mi sunca" – Award for best interpretation
- 1989. – "Pričat ću te svima"
- 1990. – "Ti si moj san" (duet with Oliver Dragojević) – 1st place
- 1990. – "Najljepše je kad si tu" – 2nd place
- 1993. – "Molitva za tebe"
- 1994. – "Do posljednjeg daha" (duet with Neno Belan) – 1st place
- 1994. – "Dok ploviš morima" – Grand prix
- 1995. – "Tko je kriv"
- 1997. – "Sto mandolina" (duet with Vinko Coce)
- 1997. – "Zarobljena" – 1st place
- 2001. – "Dobar dan ti, dušo" (duet with Tony Cetinski) – 1st place
- 2005. – "Idi s njom"
- 2006. – "Zauvijek" – 1st place
- 2007. – "Lipi moj"
- 2008. – "Zbog tebe"
- 2009. – "Kale ljubavi"
- 2010. – "Luda djelozija"
- 2011. – "Ćiba od zlata"
- 2012. – "Ljubav bez kraja"
- 2013. – "Ispod cvita od lavande"
- 2014. – "Navika"

Jugovizija

- 1990. – "Sreća je tamo gdje si ti" (duet with Oliver Dragojević), 3rd place

Dora

- 1993. – "Nema mi do tebe" 4th place
- 1994. – "Ti si moj" 4th place
- 1998. – "Nebo", 7th place
- 2006. – "Za tobom luda"

Mesam

- 1985. – "Dovoljna je ljubav" – 13th place

Zadarfest

- 1999. – "Vrati ga more" – 2nd place

Melodies of Istria and Kvarner

- 1993. – "Stara ljubav"
- 1995. – "Istarsko ljeto"
- 2001. – "Koliko dani"

Festival Opatija

- 1985. – "Sjećanja"
- 1986. – "Bar da znam"
- 1993. – "Gdje je sunca sjaj"

Opuzen – Melodies of the Croatian south

- 2002. – "Čarolija"

ZagrebFest

- 1980. – "Sve je neobično ako te volim" (as the lead vocalist for "Stijene")
- 1986. – "Vjetre"
- 2011. – "Još uvijek sanjam"

== Discography ==
With Stijene

- Cementna prašina (1981.)
- Jedanaest i petnaest (1982.)
- The Best of Stijene 15 godina – 6 žena Marina Limića (1995.)
- Zlatna kolekcija (2009.)

As a solo vocalist

- Ti si moj (1994./1995.)
- Hodajmo po zvijezdama (2001.)
- Zlatna kolekcija (2004.)
