= Tvoje lice zvuči poznato season 4 =

Tvoje lice zvuči poznato (season 4) may refer to:

- Tvoje lice zvuči poznato (Croatian season 4), the fourth season of the Croatian version of the show Your Face Sounds Familiar
- Tvoje lice zvuči poznato (Serbian season 4), the fourth season of the Serbian version of the show Your Face Sounds Familiar
