= Tvoje lice zvuči poznato (Croatian TV series) season 2 =

Tvoje lice zvuči poznato
- Season 2
- No. of episodes: 12

Release
- Original network: NovaTV
- Original release: 13 September – 6 December 2015

Season chronology
- ← Previous; Season 1 Next → Season 3

Tvoje lice zvuči poznato is the Croatian version of Your Face Sounds Familiar. It started in October 2015. There were four judges in season two, Branko Đurić (actor), Sandra Bagarić (opera singer), Tomo in der Mühlen (music producer & DJ) and different guest judges in every episode.

== Format ==
The show challenges celebrities (singers and actors) to perform as different iconic music artists every week, which are chosen by the show's "Randomiser". They are then judged by the panel of celebrity judges including Branko Đurić, Sandra Bagarić and Tomo in der Mühlen. Each week, one celebrity guest judge joins Branko, Sandra and Tomo to make up the complete judging panel. Sandra Bagarić is also a voice coach and act coach. Tomo in der Mühlen is the Executive Music Producer of the show. Each celebrity gets transformed into a different singer each week, and performs an iconic song and dance routine well known by that particular singer. The 'randomiser' can choose any older or younger artist available in the machine, or even a singer of the opposite sex, or a deceased singer. Winner of each episode wins 10 000 HRK, and winner of whole show wins 40 000 HRK. All money goes to charity of winner's own choice. The show lasts 12 weeks.

=== Voting ===
The contestants are awarded points from the judges (and each other) based on their singing and dance routines. Judges give points from 4 to 12, with the exception of 11. After that, each contestant gives 5 points to a fellow contestant of their choice (known as "Bonus" points). In week 11 (semi-final week), four contestants with the highest number of votes will qualify to the final. In week 12 (grand final), previous points will be transformed into 4-7 system, jury will give the points from 8 to 12, and contestants will give 5 points to a fellow contestant of their choice.

=== Judges ===
- Branko Đurić - Bosnian actor, comedian, director and musician
- Sandra Bagarić - Croatian opera singer
- Tomo in der Mühlen - German-born music producer and DJ based in New York City and Zagreb.

=== Guest member ===
- To be determined

== Contestants ==
Celebrity	Week 1	Week 2	Week 3	Week 4	Week 5	Week 6	Week 7	Week 8	Week 9	Week 10	Semi	Final	Total
Dušan Bučan													
Ivan Šarić													
Ivana Marić													
Luka Bulić													
Maja Posavec													
Maja Šuput													
Renata Sabljak													
Saša Lozar													

Color key:

indicates the winning contestant that week
indicates the contestant with fewest points that week
indicates the eliminated contestant
indicates the series winner
indicates the series runner-up

== Performance chart ==
Contestant	Week 1	Week 2	Week 3	Week 4	Week 5	Week 6	Week 7	Week 8	Week 9	Week 10	Week 11	Final
Saša Lozar	Maja Blagdan	Elton John	Jelena Rozga	Taylor Swift	Alice Cooper	Annie Lenox	Vanilla Ice	Leann Rimes	Louis Prima	Rod Stewart	Aretha Franklin	Beyoncé
Luka Bulić	Bee Gees	Massimo Savić	Celine Dion	AC/DC	Severina	Matija Vuica/Gracia	Kemal Monteno & Oliver Dragojević	Duffy	Luciano Pavarotti	Marvin Gaye	Maja Šuput	Eros Ramazzotti
Renata Sabljak	Jessie J	George Michael	Whitney Houston	Toše Proeski	Europe / Joey Tempest	Supremes / Diana Ross	Novi Fosili / Đurđica Barlović	Prince	Bonnie Tyler	CeeLo Green	Shakira	Pointer Sisters / Ruth Pointer
Maja Šuput	Bruno Mars	Katy Perry	Robin Thicke	Šaban Bajramović	Srebrna Krila	Džo Maračić Maki	John Travolta	Donna Summer	Lady Gaga	Ricky Martin	Justin Bieber	Miley Cyrus
Ivana Marić	Alen Islamović/Bijelo Dugme	Justin Timberlake	Gwen Stefani	Chaka Khan	Christina Aguilera	Pink	Jacques Houdek	Duško Lokin	Nelly Furtado	Gazde	Rihanna	ABBA
Maja Posavec	Sanja Doležal	Jackson 5	Hladno Pivo/Mile Kekin	Aqua	Doris Dragović	Eminem	Miami Sound Machine	Toni Braxton	Vatra/Ivan Dečak	Magazin	Kim Wilde	ABBA
Ivan Šarić	Anastacia	Antonio Banderas	Bob Marley	Grace Jones	Elvis Presley	Tomislav Ivčić	Barry White	Ella	Michael Jackson	Nicki Minaj	Shania Twain	Anđela Kolar
Dušan Bućan	Madonna	Milo Hrnić	Meghan Trainor	Shaggy	Technotronic	Samantha Fox	Ivana Banfić	Boney M.	Zdravko Čolić	Cameo	Marina Perazić	Dražen Zečić

Color key:

indicates the contestant came first that week
indicates the contestant came second that week
indicates the contestant came third that week
indicates the contestant came fourth that week
indicates the contestant came fifth that week
indicates the contestant came sixth that week
indicates the contestant came seventh that week
indicates the contestant came last that week
indicates the contestants that didn't compete in the Final

== See also ==
- Tvoje lice zvuči poznato (Croatian season 1)
- Tvoje lice zvuči poznato (Croatian season 3)
- Tvoje lice zvuči poznato (Croatian season 4)
- Tvoje lice zvuči poznato (Croatian season 5)
