= Tvoje lice zvuči poznato season 3 =

Tvoje lice zvuči poznato (season 3) may refer to:

- Tvoje lice zvuči poznato (Croatian season 3), the third season of the Croatian version of the show Your Face Sounds Familiar
- Tvoje lice zvuči poznato (Serbian season 3), the third season of the Serbian version of the show Your Face Sounds Familiar
