= Tvoje lice zvuči poznato (Croatian TV series) season 4 =

Tvoje lice zvuči poznato
- Season 4
- No. of episodes: 13

Release
- Original network: Nova TV
- Original release: 5 March – 28 May 2017

Season chronology
- ← Previous; Season 3 Next → Season 5

Tvoje lice zvuči poznato is the Croatian version of Your Face Sounds Familiar. The fourth season started in later 2017. There are four judges in season three, Goran Navojec (actor), Sandra Bagarić (opera singer), Tomo in der Mühlen (music producer & DJ) and different guest judges in every episode.

== Format ==
The show challenges celebrities (singers and actors) to perform as different iconic music artists every week, which are chosen by the show's "Randomiser". They are then judged by the panel of celebrity judges including Goran Navojec, Sandra Bagarić and Tomo in der Mühlen. Every week, one celebrity guest judge joins Goran, Sandra and Tomo to make up the complete judging panel. In the Final of the fourth season, Sandra didn't vote, so there were two guest members of the jury - Indira Levak and Mario Petreković. Each celebrity gets transformed into a different singer every week, and performs an iconic song and dance routine well known by that particular singer. The Randomiser can choose any older or younger artist available in the machine, even a singer of the opposite sex, or a deceased singer. In third season (Week 3), ability to use a joker was introduced. If celebrity wasn't happy with the Randomiser's output or thought that the task is too hard, they could ask some other celebrity to perform instead of them, but just once per season. It was announced that the show will get even more new content in the fourth season, but the 'Joker' ability was removed. The new content in the fourth season was the introduction of holographic performances. If the "Randomiser" chooses a celebrity should perform a duet, they can do it using the pre-recorded hologram for one of the given singers. The winner of every episode gets to donate 10 000 HRK, while the overall leader gets to donate 40 000 HRK at the end of the season. The show lasts for 13 weeks.

=== Voting ===
The contestants are awarded points from the judges (and each other) based on their singing and dance routines. Judges award from 4 to 12 - excluding 11 - points to each contestant. After that, each contestant gives 5 points to a fellow contestant of their choice (known as "Bonus" points). In week 12 (semi-final week), four contestants with the highest number of votes will qualify to the final. In week 13 (grand final), previous points will be transformed into a 4-7 system, the jury will award from 8 to 12 points, and contestants will give 5 points to a fellow contestant of their choice.

=== Judges ===
- Tomo in der Mühlen - German-born music producer and DJ based in New York City and Zagreb.
- Goran Navojec - Croatian actor, known for many roles on television series and in feature films.
- Sandra Bagarić - Bosnian opera singer also active in Croatia (didn't judge in the Final)

=== Guest member ===
- Damir Kedžo (Week 1)
- Jelena Rozga (Week 2)
- Bojana Gregorić Vejzović (Week 3)
- Jacques Houdek (Week 4)
- Lana Jurčević (Week 5)
- Baby Dooks (Week 6)
- Mia Kovačić (Week 7)
- Zorica Kondža (Week 8)
- Matteo Cetinski (Week 9)
- Ivanka Mazurkijević (Week 10)
- Marko Tolja (Week 11)
- Irina Čulinović (Week 12)
- Indira Levak and Mario Petreković (Week 13 - Final)

== Contestants ==
Celebrity	Week 1	Week 2	Week 3	Week 4	Week 5	Week 6	Week 7	Week 8	Week 9	Week 10	Week 11	Week 12	Points	Final	Result
Nives Celzijus	34	53	24	38	28	43	28	67	33	30	34	49	461	64	1st
Bojan Jambrošić	25	16	34	73	18	44	45	38	40	33	33	58	457	57	2nd
Mia Anočić-Valentić	31	38	56	42	28	28	44	34	71	49	29	19	469	55	3rd
Mario Roth	66	27	46	33	37	20	32	28	32	29	63	40	453	42	4th
Dalibor Petko	50	30	39	21	35	40	48	37	27	44	27	43	441	Failed to qualify	5th
Ivana Mišerić	19	69	18	19	45	45	22	39	19	48	22	30	395	Failed to qualify	6th
Ana Gruica	28	26	23	30	72	26	37	18	45	26	16	26	373	Failed to qualify	7th
Daniel Bilić	31	25	44	28	21	38	28	23	17	25	60	19	359	Failed to qualify	8th

Color key:

indicates the winning contestant that week
indicates the contestant with fewest points that week
indicates the series winner
indicates the series runner-up

== Week 1 ==
Guest Judge: Damir Kedžo
Aired: March 5, 2017
Winner: Mario Roth

Order	Celebrity	Performing as	Song	Points (judges and contestants)					Total	Result
Order	Celebrity	Performing as	Song	Tomo	Goran	Sandra	Damir	Bonus	Total	Result
1	Nives Celzijus	Baha Men	"Who Let the Dogs Out?"	9	5	10	10	0	34	3rd
2	Ivana Mišerić	Madonna	"Like A Virgin"	5	4	5	5	0	19	8th
3	Bojan Jambrošić	Toše Proeski	"Pratim te"	4	7	6	8	0	25	7th
4	Mia Anočić-Valentić	Chubby Checker	"Let's Twist Again"	10	8	7	6	0	31	4th
5	Ana Gruica	Jennifer Lopez	"Ain't It Funny"	7	6	8	7	0	28	6th
6	Mario Roth	Tina Turner	"Simply the Best"	12	10	12	12	20	66	1st
7	Daniel Bilić	Ricky Martin	"She Bangs"	6	12	4	4	5	31	4th
8	Dalibor Petko	Colonia	"Za tvoje snene oči"	8	9	9	9	15	50	2nd

Opening act

- Damir Kedžo - Not A Crime

Bonus points

- Nives gave five points to Dalibor
- Ivana gave five points to Dalibor
- Bojan gave five points to Dalibor
- Mia gave five points to Mario
- Ana gave five points to Mario
- Mario gave five points to Daniel
- Daniel gave five points to Mario
- Dalibor gave five points to Mario

== Week 2 ==
Guest Judge: Jelena Rozga
Aired: March 12, 2017
Winner: Ivana Mišerić

Order	Celebrity	Performing as	Song	Points (judges and contestants)					Total	Result
Order	Celebrity	Performing as	Song	Tomo	Jelena	Sandra	Goran	Bonus	Total	Result
1	Dalibor Petko	Bijelo Dugme	"Tako ti je mala moja kad ljubi Bosanac"	8	9	8	5	0	30	4th
2	Mario Roth	Don Omar	"Danza Kuduro"	5	8	6	8	0	27	5th
3	Mia Anočić-Valentić	Dražen Zečić	"Pokidat ću lance sve"	7	7	9	10	5	38	3rd
4	Ivana Mišerić	Maroon 5	"Sugar"	10	10	12	12	25	69	1st
5	Ana Gruica	Ray Charles	"Hit the Road Jack"	6	6	7	7	0	26	6th
6	Bojan Jambrošić	Jelena Rozga	"Razmažena"	4	4	4	4	0	16	8th
7	Nives Celzijus	The Prodigy	"Firestarter"	12	12	10	9	10	53	2nd
8	Daniel Bilić	Denis & Denis	"Ja sam lažljiva"	9	5	5	6	0	25	7th

Opening act

- Jelena Rozga - Žileti

Bonus points

- Dalibor gave five points to Ivana
- Mario gave five points to Mia
- Mia gave five points to Ivana
- Ivana gave five points to Nives
- Ana gave five points to Nives
- Bojan gave five points to Ivana
- Nives gave five points to Ivana
- Daniel gave five points to Ivana

== Week 3 ==
Guest Judge: Bojana Gregorić Vejzović
Aired: March 19, 2017
Winner: Mia Anočić Valentić

Order	Celebrity	Performing as	Song	Points (judges and contestants)					Total	Result
Order	Celebrity	Performing as	Song	Goran	Bojana	Sandra	Tomo	Bonus	Total	Result
1	Daniel Bilić	Pitbull	"I Know You Want Me"	8	5	9	7	15	44	3rd
2	Ivana Mišerić	Kiss	"I Was Made For Loving You"	6	4	4	4	0	18	8th
3	Mario Roth	Danijela Martinović	"Volim barabu"	12	12	12	10	0	46	2nd
4	Bojan Jambrošić	OMI	"Cheerleader"	9	9	8	8	0	34	5th
5	Dalibor Petko	Spice Girls	"Wannabe"	10	7	5	12	5	39	4th
6	Ana Gruica	Ilan Kabiljo	"Kad nema ljubavi"	4	8	6	5	0	23	7th
7	Mia Anočić-Valentić	Novi fosili	"E moj Saša"	7	10	10	9	20	56	1st
8	Nives Celzijus	Shakira	"Objection"	5	6	7	6	0	24	6th

Bonus points

- Daniel gave five points to Mia
- Ivana gave five points to Daniel
- Mario gave five points to Dalibor
- Bojan gave five points to Mia
- Dalibor gave five points to Mia
- Ana gave five points to Daniel
- Mia gave five points to Daniel
- Nives gave five points to Mia

== Week 4 ==
Guest Judge: Jacques Houdek
Aired: March 26, 2017
Winner: Bojan Jambrošić

Order	Celebrity	Performing as	Song	Points (judges and contestants)					Total	Result
Order	Celebrity	Performing as	Song	Jacques	Sandra	Goran	Tomo	Bonus	Total	Result
1	Mario Roth	Guns N' Roses	"Paradise City"	9	7	7	10	0	33	4th
2	Nives Celzijus	Zvonko Bogdan	"Moja mala nema mane"	10	9	8	6	5	38	3rd
3	Ana Gruica	Katy Perry	"Last Friday Night"	5	8	9	8	0	30	5th
4	Ivana Mišerić	Ottawan	"D.I.S.C.O."	4	4	6	5	0	19	8th
5	Daniel Bilić	Nives Celzijus	"Karanfili"	6	5	5	7	5	28	6th
6	Dalibor Petko	Prljavo kazalište	"Ne zovi mama doktora"	7	6	4	4	0	21	7th
7	Mia Anočić-Valentić	Fergie	"My Humps"	8	10	12	12	0	42	2nd
8	Bojan Jambrošić	Jacques Houdek	"Ima nešto u tome"	12	12	10	9	30	73	1st
8	Bojan Jambrošić	Doris Dragović	"Ima nešto u tome"	12	12	10	9	30	73	1st

Opening act

- Jacques Houdek - Kad nekoga voliš

Bonus points

- Mario gave five points to Bojan
- Nives gave five points to Daniel
- Ana gave five points to Bojan
- Ivana gave five points to Bojan
- Daniel gave five points to Bojan
- Dalibor gave five points to Bojan
- Mia gave five points to Bojan
- Bojan gave five points to Nives

== Week 5 ==
Guest Judge: Lana Jurčević
Aired: April 2, 2017
Winner: Ana Gruica

Order	Celebrity	Performing as	Song	Points (judges and contestants)					Total	Result
Order	Celebrity	Performing as	Song	Tomo	Lana	Sandra	Goran	Bonus	Total	Result
1	Ana Gruica	Oliver Dragojević	"Nadalina"	10	10	10	7	35	72	1st
1	Ana Gruica	Boris Dvornik	"Nadalina"	10	10	10	7	35	72	1st
2	Dalibor Petko	Las Ketchup	"The Ketchup Song"	5	9	6	10	5	35	4th
3	Mia Anočić-Valentić	Magazin	"Sve bi seke ljubile mornare"	6	6	7	9	0	28	5th
4	Ivana Mišerić	New Kids on the Block	"Step By Step"	12	12	9	12	0	45	2nd
5	Bojan Jambrošić	Nina Badrić	"Takvi kao ti"	4	4	4	6	0	18	8th
6	Daniel Bilić	Will Smith	"Gettin' Jiggy Wit It"	7	5	5	4	0	21	7th
7	Nives Celzijus	Olivia Newton-John	"Physical"	8	7	8	5	0	28	5th
8	Mario Roth	Gipsy Kings	"Bamboléo"	9	8	12	8	0	37	3rd
8	Mario Roth	Gipsy Kings	"Djobi Djoba"	9	8	12	8	0	37	3rd
8	Mario Roth	Gipsy Kings	"Baila Me"	9	8	12	8	0	37	3rd

Opening act

- Lana Jurčević - Šećeru

Bonus points

- Ana gave five points to Dalibor
- Dalibor gave five points to Ana
- Mia gave five points to Ana
- Ivana gave five points to Ana
- Bojan gave five points to Ana
- Daniel gave five points to Ana
- Nives gave five points to Ana
- Mario gave five points to Ana

== Week 6 ==
Guest Judge: Baby Dooks (David Vurdelja)
Aired: April 9, 2017
Winner: Ivana Mišerić

Order	Celebrity	Performing as	Song	Points (judges and contestants)					Total	Result
Order	Celebrity	Performing as	Song	David	Tomo	Sandra	Goran	Bonus	Total	Result
1	Dalibor Petko	Mory Kante	"Yé ké yé ké"	4	10	12	9	5	40	4th
2	Ivana Mišerić	Britney Spears	"Toxic"	6	12	10	12	5	45	1st
3	Mia Anočić-Valentić	Bolesna braća	"Lovačke priče"	5	5	6	7	5	28	6th
4	Bojan Jambrošić	Kool and the Gang	"Fresh"	12	8	9	10	5	44	2nd
5	Mario Roth	Maja Šuput	"Lopove"	8	4	4	4	0	20	8th
6	Nives Celzijus	Coolio	"Gangsta's Paradise"	10	9	8	6	10	43	3rd
7	Ana Gruica	Tajči	"Moj mali je opasan"	7	7	7	5	0	26	7th
8	Daniel Bilić	Chuck Berry	"You Never Can Tell"	9	6	5	8	10	38	5th

Bonus points

- Dalibor gave five points to Daniel
- Ivana gave five points to Mia
- Mia gave five points to Nives
- Bojan gave five points to Daniel
- Mario gave five points to Nives
- Nives gave five points to Bojan
- Ana gave five points to Ivana
- Daniel gave five points to Dalibor

== Week 7 ==
Guest Judge: Mia Kovačić
Aired: April 16, 2017
Winner: Dalibor Petko

Order	Celebrity	Performing as	Song	Points (judges and contestants)					Total	Result
Order	Celebrity	Performing as	Song	Goran	Sandra	Mia	Tomo	Bonus	Total	Result
1	Ana Gruica	Salt'N'Pepa	"Push It"	10	9	6	12	0	37	4th
2	Daniel Bilić	Alka Vuica	"Ej, što mi radiš"	7	7	8	6	0	28	6th
3	Ivana Mišerić	Michael Jackson	"Love Never Felt So Good"	5	4	4	4	5	22	8th
3	Ivana Mišerić	Justin Timberlake	"Love Never Felt So Good"	5	4	4	4	5	22	8th
4	Bojan Jambrošić	Mate Mišo Kovač	"Ako me ostaviš"	12	10	10	8	5	45	2nd
4	Bojan Jambrošić	Mate Mišo Kovač	"Drugi joj raspliće kosu"	12	10	10	8	5	45	2nd
5	Dalibor Petko	Amy Winehouse	"Valerie"	9	8	12	9	10	48	1st
6	Nives Celzijus	Severina	"Paloma Nera"	6	5	7	5	5	28	6th
7	Mia Anočić-Valentić	Cesária Évora	"Bésame Mucho"	8	12	9	10	5	44	3rd
8	Mario Roth	Patrick Swayze	"Do You Love Me"	4	6	5	7	10	32	5th

Bonus points

- Ana gave five points to Mia
- Daniel gave five points to Bojan
- Ivana gave five points to Mario
- Bojan gave five points to Dalibor
- Dalibor gave five points to Nives
- Nives gave five points to Mario
- Mia gave five points to Dalibor
- Mario gave five points to Ivana

== Week 8 ==
Guest Judge: Zorica Kondža
Aired: April 23, 2017
Winner: Nives Celzijus

Order	Celebrity	Performing as	Song	Points (judges and contestants)					Total	Result
Order	Celebrity	Performing as	Song	Tomo	Zorica	Goran	Sandra	Bonus	Total	Result
1	Mia Anočić Valentić	Kenny Loggins	"Footloose"	10	9	7	8	0	34	5th
2	Bojan Jambrošić	Zorica Kondža	"Ima jedan svijet"	7	10	9	12	0	38	3rd
3	Daniel Bilić	Roxette	"The Look"	4	4	5	5	5	23	7th
4	Ana Gruica	Miroslav Škoro	"Otvor ženo kapiju"	5	5	4	4	0	18	8th
4	Ana Gruica	Miroslav Škoro	"Moja Juliška"	5	5	4	4	0	18	8th
5	Mario Roth	Aerosmith	"Don't Wanna Miss a Thing"	9	6	6	7	0	28	6th
6	Nives Celzijus	Ylvis	"The Fox"	8	12	12	10	25	67	1st
7	Ivana Mišerić	Plavi orkestar	"Bolje biti pijan nego star"	12	8	10	9	0	39	2nd
7	Ivana Mišerić	Plavi orkestar	"Ako su to samo bile laži"	12	8	10	9	0	39	2nd
8	Dalibor Petko	Inner Circle	"Sweat"	6	7	8	6	10	37	4th

Bonus points

- Mia gave five points to Nives
- Bojan gave five points to Nives
- Daniel gave five points to Dalibor
- Ana gave five points to Daniel
- Mario gave five points to Nives
- Nives gave five points to Dalibor
- Ivana gave five points to Nives
- Dalibor gave five points to Nives

== Week 9 ==
Guest Judge: Matteo Cetinski
Aired: April 30, 2017
Winner: Mia Anočić-Valentić

Order	Celebrity	Performing as	Song	Points (judges and contestants)					Total	Result
Order	Celebrity	Performing as	Song	Matteo	Sandra	Goran	Tomo	Bonus	Total	Result
1	Dalibor Petko	Elton John	"Don't Go Breakin' My Heart"	9	6	6	6	0	27	6th
1	Dalibor Petko	RuPaul	"Don't Go Breakin' My Heart"	9	6	6	6	0	27	6th
2	Nives Celzijus	Let 3	"Ero s onoga svijeta"	8	9	7	9	0	33	4th
3	Ana Gruica	Doris Day	"Perhaps, Perhaps, Perhaps"	10	12	10	8	5	45	2nd
4	Mario Roth	George Michael	"Freedom"	6	8	8	10	0	32	5th
5	Daniel Bilić	Vaya Con Dios	"Nah Neh Nah"	4	5	4	4	0	17	8th
6	Bojan Jambrošić	Prince	"Cream"	7	7	9	7	10	40	3rd
7	Mia Anočić Valentić	Tereza Kesovija	"Nima Splita do Splita"	12	10	12	12	25	71	1st
8	Ivana Mišerić	Rihanna	"We Found Love"	5	4	5	5	0	19	7th

Bonus points

- Dalibor gave five points to Mia
- Nives gave five points to Mia
- Ana gave five points to Bojan
- Mario gave five points to Mia
- Daniel gave five points to Mia
- Bojan gave five points to Ana
- Mia gave five points to Bojan
- Ivana gave five points to Mia

== Week 10 ==
Guest Judge: Ivanka Mazurkijević
Aired: May 7, 2017
Winner: Mia Anočić-Valentić

Order	Celebrity	Performing as	Song	Points (judges and contestants)					Total	Result
Order	Celebrity	Performing as	Song	Tomo	Ivanka	Sandra	Goran	Bonus	Total	Result
1	Mia Anočić Valentić	Irene Cara	"Flashdance... What a Feeling"	10	12	9	8	10	49	1st
2	Nives Celzijus	Ivanka Mazurkijević	"Dolje je bolje"	8	10	7	5	0	30	5th
2	Nives Celzijus	Mile Kekin	"Dolje je bolje"	8	10	7	5	0	30	5th
3	Ivana Mišerić	Scatman	"Scatman (Ski-Ba-Bop-Ba-Dop-Bop)"	12	9	12	10	5	48	2nd
4	Mario Roth	Annamaria	"Novi svijet"	9	5	8	7	0	29	6th
5	Dalibor Petko	Jim Carrey	"Cuban Pete" (The Mask Soundtrack)	6	6	6	6	20	44	3rd
6	Bojan Jambrošić	Josipa Lisac	"Danas sam luda"	7	7	10	9	0	33	4th
7	Ana Gruica	Fantomi	"Duda"	5	8	4	4	5	26	7th
8	Daniel Bilić	Diana Ross	"Upside Down"	4	4	5	12	0	25	8th

Bonus points

- Mia gave five points to Dalibor
- Nives gave five points to Dalibor
- Ivana gave five points to Dalibor
- Mario gave five points to Dalibor
- Dalibor gave five points to Ivana
- Bojan gave five points to Mia
- Ana gave five points to Mia
- Daniel gave five points to Ana

== Week 11 ==
Guest Judge: Marko Tolja
Aired: May 14, 2017
Winner: Mario Roth

Order	Celebrity	Performing as	Song	Points (judges and contestants)					Total	Result
Order	Celebrity	Performing as	Song	Goran	Sandra	Marko	Tomo	Bonus	Total	Result
1	Mia Anočić Valentić	Michael Jackson	"Black or White"	9	7	7	6	0	29	5th
2	Bojan Jambrošić	En Vogue	"Don't Let Go (Love)"	7	9	10	7	0	33	4th
3	Ana Gruica	Dschinghis Khan	"Dschinghis Khan"	4	4	4	4	0	16	8th
4	Nives Celzijus	Survivor	"Eye of the Tiger"	8	8	8	10	0	34	3rd
5	Dalibor Petko	Lidija Bačić	"Viski"	5	5	9	8	0	27	6th
6	Daniel Bilić	Rag'n'Bone Man	"Human"	10	10	6	9	25	60	2nd
7	Ivana Mišerić	Grease	"Summer Nights"	6	6	5	5	0	22	7th
8	Mario Roth	Freddie Mercury	"Barcelona"	12	12	12	12	15	63	1st
8	Mario Roth	Montserrat Caballe	"Barcelona"	12	12	12	12	15	63	1st

Bonus points

- Mia gave five points to Daniel
- Bojan gave five points to Daniel
- Ana gave five points to Daniel
- Nives gave five points to Mario
- Daniel gave five points to Mario
- Dalibor gave five points to Mario
- Ivana gave five points to Daniel
- Mario gave five points to Daniel

== Week 12 ==
Guest Judge: Irina Čulinović
Aired: May 21, 2017
Winner: Bojan Jambrošić

Order	Celebrity	Performing as	Song	Points (judges and contestants)					Total	Result
Order	Celebrity	Performing as	Song	Tomo	Irina	Sandra	Goran	Bonus	Total	Result
1	Mia Anočić Valentić	Sia	"Cheap Thrills"	4	6	5	4	0	19	7th
1	Mia Anočić Valentić	Sean Paul	"Cheap Thrills"	4	6	5	4	0	19	7th
2	Daniel Bilić	Ivo Robić	"Samo jednom se ljubi"	5	5	4	5	0	19	7th
3	Ana Gruica	The Pussycat Dolls	"Don't Cha"	8	4	6	8	0	26	6th
4	Mario Roth	James Brown	"Get Up (I Feel Like Being a) Sex Machine"	12	9	9	10	0	40	4th
5	Nives Celzijus	Cher	"Welcome To Burlesque"	10	10	12	7	10	49	2nd
6	Dalibor Petko	Helena Paparizou	"My Number One"	7	7	8	6	15	43	3rd
7	Bojan Jambrošić	Ed Sheeran	"Thinking Out Loud"	9	12	10	12	15	58	1st
8	Ivana Mišerić	Lady Gaga	"Telephone"	6	8	7	9	0	30	5th

Bonus points

- Mia gave five points to Bojan
- Daniel gave five points to Bojan
- Ana gave five points to Bojan
- Mario gave five points to Nives
- Nives gave five points to Dalibor
- Dalibor gave five points to Nives
- Bojan gave five points to Dalibor
- Ivana gave five points to Dalibor

== Week 13 - Final ==
Guest Judges: Indira Levak and Mario Petreković
Aired: May 28, 2017
Winner: Nives Celzijus

Order	Celebrity	Performing as	Song	Points (starting, judges, contestants)						Total	Result
Order	Celebrity	Performing as	Song	Starting	Goran	Indira	Tomo	Mario	Bonus	Total	Result
1	Mario Roth	Madonna	"La Isla Bonita"	4	9	10	10	9	0	42	4th
1	Mario Roth	Madonna	"Pala Tute"	4	9	10	10	9	0	42	4th
2	Bojan Jambrošić	The Cranberries	"Zombie"	5	8	12	9	8	15	57	2nd
3	Nives Celzijus	Red Hot Chilli Pepers	"Dani California"	6	10	9	12	12	15	64	1st
4	Mia Anočić Valentić	Kylie Minogue	"In Your Eyes"	7	12	8	8	10	10	55	3rd
5	Dalibor Petko	Azucar Moreno	"Bandido"	Not competing							5th
5	Ivana Mišerić	Azucar Moreno	"Bandido"	Not competing							6th
6	Daniel Bilić	Josipa Lisac	”Nek’ se dijete zove kao ja”	Not competing							8th
6	Ana Gruica	Gibonni	”Nek’ se dijete zove kao ja”	Not competing							7th

Opening act

- Colonia - "Lei lei"

Interval act

Celebrity	Performing as	Song
Igor Barberić	Wisin	"Adrenalina"
Igor Barberić	Jennifer Lopez	"Adrenalina"
Igor Barberić	Ricky Martin	"Adrenalina"

Bonus points

- Mario gave five points to Nives
- Bojan gave five points to Mia
- Nives gave five points to Mia
- Mia gave five points to Bojan
- Dalibor gave five points to Nives
- Ivana gave five points to Nives
- Ana gave five points to Bojan
- Daniel gave five points to Bojan

== See also ==
- Tvoje lice zvuči poznato (Croatian TV series)
- Tvoje lice zvuči poznato (Croatian season 1)
- Tvoje lice zvuči poznato (Croatian season 2)
- Tvoje lice zvuči poznato (Croatian season 3)
- Tvoje lice zvuči poznato (Croatian season 5)
