= Nives Celsius =

Croatian singer (born 1981)

Nives Celzijus
- Also known as: Nives Celsius
- Born: Nives Zeljković; 18 December 1981 (age 44); Zagreb, SR Croatia, Yugoslavia
- Genre: Folk-pop
- Occupations: Model; columnist; writer; singer
- Years active: 1999–present
- Website: Official website

Nives Zeljković (Croatian pronunciation: [zěːʎkoʋit͡ɕ]; born 18 December 1981), known by her stage name Nives Celzijus or Nives Celsius, is a Croatian model and singer-songwriter.

== Early life ==
Nives Zeljković was born in Zagreb, at the time part of Yugoslavia. Her biological, estranged father – Spaso Čanković (known as Anej Sam) – was born in Sanski Most, Bosnia and Herzegovina, and works as a writer in Slovenia. Her parents separated prior to her birth. During the Croatian War of Independence, she was abused due to her surname. Nives Celzijus has stated that she was raped at the age of sixteen by a Dinamo Zagreb footballer, who did not reveal their name. She lived in Belgrade for years before returning to Zagreb, where she released the song "Na koljena" (lit. 'On Your Knees') which became a hit.

== Career ==
In 2014, Nives Celzijus was one of the judges in the Episode 11 of the Season 1 of Tvoje lice zvuči poznato, the Croatian version of Your Face Sounds Familiar. On 27 January 2017, she competed in the Season 4 of the series. Nives Celzijus won only one of the twelve episodes, imitating Ylvis with the song "The Fox (What Does the Fox Say?)", but still got enough points to qualify to the final round, achieving the second highest number of points. In the final, she imitated Anthony Kiedis of the Red Hot Chili Peppers with the smash hit song "Dani California", which lead her to the victory. She was the first female winner of the series and a public favourite, with performances imitating The Prodigy member Keith Flint, Severina, Zvonko Bogdan, and Sylvester Stallone from the 1976 film Rocky.

== Personal life ==
Nives Celzijus married Croatian footballer Dino Drpić, with whom she has two children. The couple has been dubbed "David and Victoria Beckham of Baden" in Germany. As a guest of Serbian RTV Pink show Ami G Show on 22 January 2009, Nives Celzijus stated she and her husband had sex in an empty Stadion Maksimir, a statement which attracted a lot of media attention.

In October 2009, Nives Celcius was sentenced by the Municipal Criminal Court for defamation after she stated in an interview for the Serbian version of Playboy magazine that her father molested her. In 2014, she and Drpić divorced in a friendly manner.

== Sexiest women countdowns ==
Year	Magazine	Edition	Position
2009	FHM	Croatia	15
2009	FHM	Germany	15
2009	FHM	Slovenia	8

== Awards and nominations ==
Year	Award	Category	For	Result
2009	Kiklop Book Awards	Hit Novel of the Year	Gola istina	Won
2017	Tvoje lice zvuči poznato	Best Imitator	Dani California	Won
