= Vinko Coce =

- Born: 22 December 1954; Trogir, PR Croatia, FPR Yugoslavia (now Croatia)
- Died: 26 October 2013 (aged 58) Split, Croatia
- Genres: Opera, pop
- Instruments: Vocals
- Years active: 1972–2013
- Labels: Croatia Records; S Records; Scardona; Menart
- Formerly of: Klapa Trogir

Vinko Coce (22 December 1954 – 26 October 2013) was a prominent Croatian opera and pop singer. He is considered one of his generation's greatest representatives of Croatian music.

== Biography ==
Coce was born in Trogir and joined the Klapa Trogir in 1972. Between 1983 and 1988, he was a tenor in the mixed choir of the Croatian National Theatre in Split. He started a solo singing career in 1991, during which he won the Grand Prix at the Split Festival with the song "Sićaš li se, Lungomare". Coce also won a Porin with the Klapa Trogir.

Coce died on 26 October 2013 at Split Hospital, a few minutes before midnight, after a lengthy undisclosed illness. He was 58.

== Discography ==
=== Studio albums ===
- Mirno spavaj, ružo moja, 1993, Croatia Records
- Mama, adio, 1995, Croatia Records
- Dalmacija, more, ja i ti, 2000, Orfej
- Ane, jel' te baca, 2002, Croatia Records
- More sinje, 2006, Menart Records
- Morska svitanja, 2013, Scardona
