= Jasna Zlokić =

Croatian female pop singer (born 1955)

- Born: Jasna Dragojević; 15 March 1955 (age 71); Vela Luka, FPR Yugoslavia (now Croatia)
- Occupation: Singer
- Years active: 1982–present
- Spouse: Boris Zlokić
- Children: Igor Zlokić

Jasna Zlokić (née Dragojević) (born 15 March 1955) is a Croatian female pop singer.

Zlokić was born in Vela Luka. Her first major hit was the song Skitnica (lit. "Vagabond"), written by Rajko Dujmić, which she has performed at the Split Festival in 1984.

Since the 1980s, she released 12 albums under major Yugoslav and Croatian record labels.

== Discography ==
=== Studio albums ===
- 1984 - Pusti me da prođem
- 1985 - Vjeruj mi
- 1987 - Ja sam ti jedini drug
- 1988 - Lutajuće srce
- 1989 - Vrijeme je uz nas
- 1990 - Kad odu svi
- 1991 - Tiho sviraj pjesmu ljubavnu
- 1992 - Bez predaha (mix)
- 1993 - Nisam ti se tugo nadala
- 1996 - Sunce moga neba
- 1999 - Žena od mota
- 2002 - Putevima vjetra
- 2006 - Ljubavni parfemi
- 2010 - Dueti

=== Compilation albums ===
- 1997 - Sve ove godine (best of)
- 2004 - Best of 1990 - 2004
- 2007 - Zlatna Kolekcija (Best of)
- 2012 - Love collection (najbolje ljubavne pjesme)
- 2015 - Best of Jasna Zlokić
- 2017 - 50 originalnih pjesama
- 2024 - 25 Greatest Hits
