= Joško Čagalj Jole =

Croatian pop singer

Jole
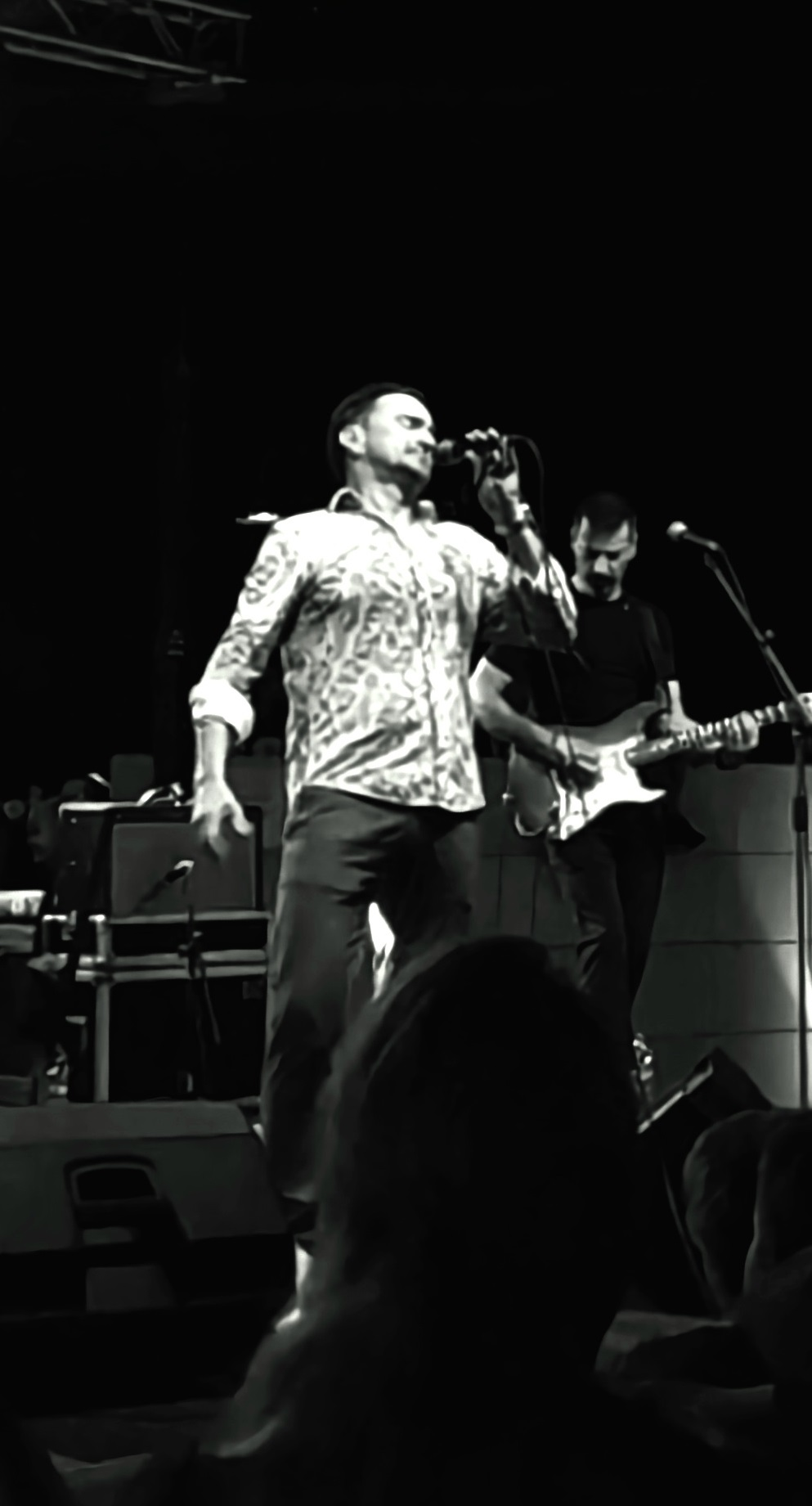
- Born: Joško Čagalj; 15 February 1972 (age 54); Heilbronn, West Germany
- Occupation: Singer
- Spouse: Ana Čagalj (m. 2006)
- Children: 4
- Musical career
- Genres: Pop
- Instrument: Vocals
- Years active: 1988–present
- Labels: Hit Records; Tonika Records

Joško Čagalj (Croatian pronunciation: [jôʃko t͡ʃǎɡaʎ]; born 15 February 1972), better known under his stage name Jole, is a Croatian pop singer.

He married his wife Ana in 2006, and has three daughters and one son with her. Although he was born in Heilbronn, he spent his childhood in Zagvozd, his father's birthplace and later moved to Split.

The song "Nosi mi se bijela boja" (English: I Want to Wear White Color) is a love song that through time came to evolve as a cheering song during football matches. It discusses human kindness through its metaphor to the white color.

On 22 September 2025, Jole released his newest single "Od malih nogu" (English: Since Young Legs) written by the Huljić duo and arranged by Leo Škaro.

== Discography ==
Studio albums

- Jednina i množina (1999)
- Sve su žene lijepe (2001)
- Otključano! (2004)
- Retrorama (2005)
- Odijelo (2009)
- Remek djelo (2014)
- Pijanica nisam (2015)

Compilations

- Zlatna kolekcija (2007)
