= Milo Hrnić =

Croatian pop singer (1950–2023)

- Born: 3 February 1950; Dubrovnik, PR Croatia, Yugoslavia
- Died: 16 September 2023 (aged 73) Dubrovnik, Croatia
- Occupations: Singer; politician
- Instrument: Vocals
- Years active: 1980–2023

Milo Hrnić (3 February 1946 – 16 September 2023) was a Croatian pop singer. His performances were characterised by emotional intensity and frequent crowd interactions. His resonant and forceful baritone and distinct brand of poetic lyrics had proclaimed him as one of the most commercially and critically successful Croatian pop singers. Alongside Tereza Kesovija, he was pronounced "the singer of the century" in his native Dubrovnik.

Hrnić won the Split Festival three times: in 1982 with "Vrati se", in 1983 with "Dalmacijo, ljubav si vječna" and in 1987 with "Dobra večer prijatelji".

== Political activity ==
Hrnić was a member of Dubrovnik's city council, originally with the Croatian People's Party (HNS), but later as an independent.

== Death ==
Milo Hrnić died from an infection in Dubrovnik, on 16 September 2023, at the age of 73.

== Discography ==
- 1980 – Milo
- 1981 – Samo ti
- 1982 – Lutaj pjesmo moja
- 1983 – Potraži me
- 1984 – Zagrli me jače
- 1985 – S tobom sam jači
- 1987 – Pozovi me
- 1988 – Ja neću takav život
- 1989 – Tvoja mati je legla da spava
- 1990 – Sad sam opet svoj na svome
- 1992 – Biser Hrvatski
- 1993 – 20 mojih uspjeha
- 1994 – Na kominu moga ćaće
- 1997 – Sve me tebi zove
- 1999 – Vrijeme ljubavi
- 2007 – Zlatna kolekcija
- 2008 – Za sva vremena
