= Mario Petreković =

Croatian television actor and presenter

- Born: 8 July 1972 (age 53); Bjelovar, SR Croatia, SFR Yugoslavia
- Occupations: Comedian; actor; television presenter
- Years active: 1994–present
- Partner: Aleksandra Kramberger

Mario Petreković (born 8 July 1972) is a Croatian comedian, actor, television presenter and entertainer. He is the winner of the first season of Tvoje lice zvuči poznato.

== Filmography ==
=== Movie roles ===
Year	Film	Role	Notes
2014	Asterix: The Land of the Gods	Asterix	Croatian version
2010	Despicable Me	The Minions	Croatian version

=== Television roles ===
Year	Film	Role	Notes
2014	Tvoje lice zvuči poznato (Croatian version of Your Face Sounds Familiar)	Competitor	Won
2013	Stipe u gostima	Žac	Episode: "Francuzi"
2011	Stipe u gostima	television presenter	Episode: "Nagradna igra"
2010	Periferija city	television presenter	Episode: "Trnje I zvijezde"
2007	A Mess in the House	himself	Episode: "Život piše romane"

== Personal life ==
Petreković is of Kosovo Croat descent.
