= Jasmin Stavros =

Croatian pop singer (1954–2023)

- Born: Milo Vasić; 1 November 1954; Split, PR Croatia, FPR Yugoslavia
- Died: 3 May 2023 (aged 68); KBC Zagreb, Zagreb, Croatia
- Occupation: Singer
- Years active: 1970s–2023

Milo Vasić (1 November 1954 – 3 May 2023), better known as Jasmin Stavros, was a Croatian pop singer.

== Life and career ==
Stavros was born in Split in a family of Romanian descent. One of his most popular songs remains "Dao bih sto Amerika" ("I Would Give a Hundred Americas"), which relates to his time spent in the United States before his return to Croatia shortly before the country's independence, which peaked at number two on the Yugoslav national charts. It was later rerecorded in 2015 as a remix version with the help of Croatian DJ Podra. He was signed to Hit Records.

Stavros died on 3 May 2023, at the age of 68.

== Discography ==
- 1987: Priče iz kavane
- 1988: Evo mene opet
- 1989: Ljubio sam anđela
- 1991: Prijatelji
- 1993: E moj čovječe
- 1995: Dijamanti
- 1997: Zrak, zemlja zrak
- 1998: Evo puta mog
- 2000: Jutrima
- 2002: Vučja vremena
- 2004: Krećem ponovo
- 2007: Nemoj se udavati
- 2013: Ljubomorni ljudi
