= Tomo in der Mühlen =

German musician

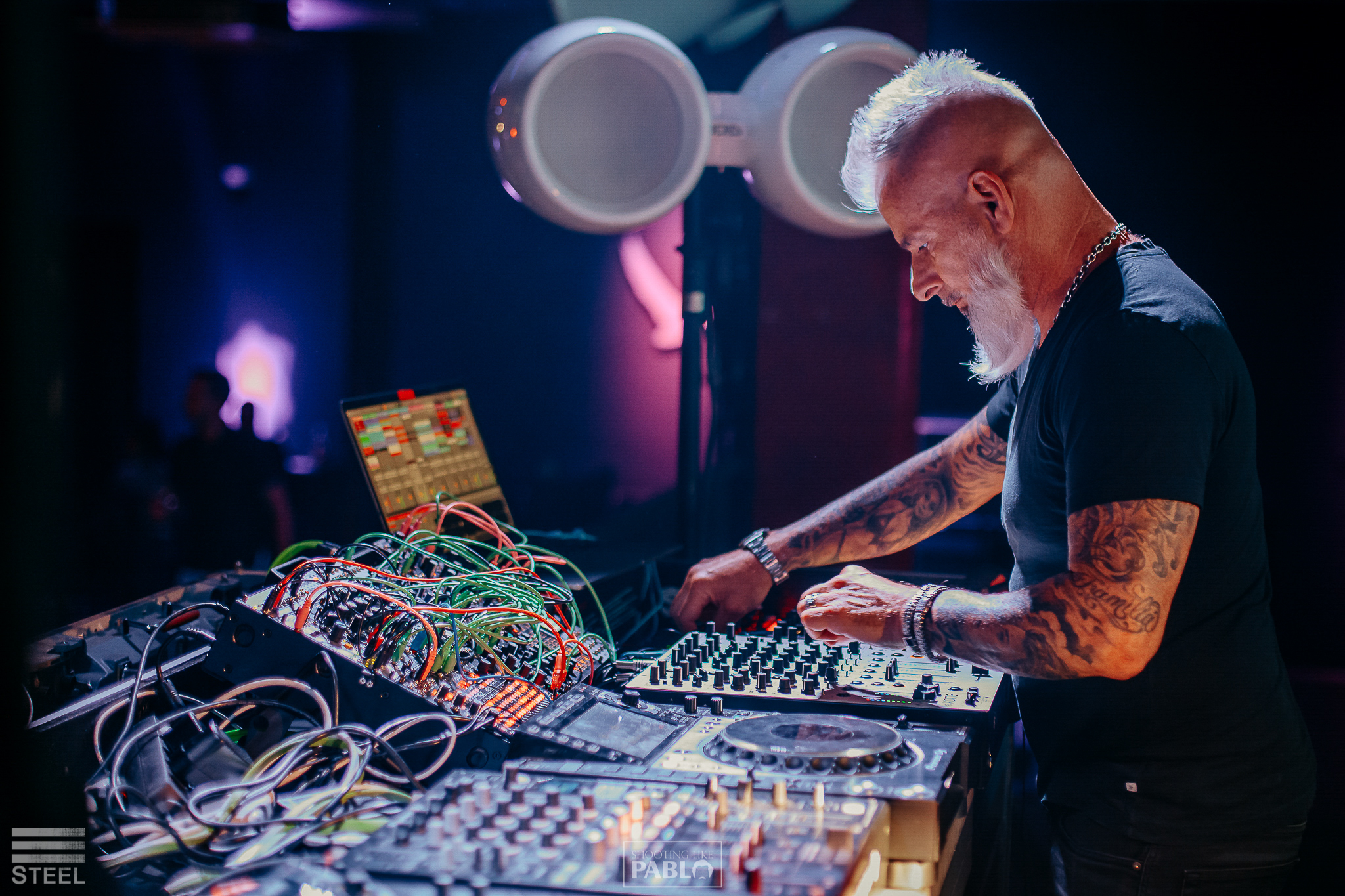
- Steel Rovinj

Background information
- Also known as: Tomo RAW
- Born: Tomo Johannes in der Mühlen
- Genres: Techno, electronic music, experimental, minimal techno
- Occupations: Producer, musician, DJ
- Instruments: Modular synth, Ableton Live, Guitar
- Website: www.idmmusic.com

Tomo Johannes in der Mühlen aka Tom Tom or DJ Tomo is a German DJ, producer and recording artist based in New York City and Zagreb.

== Early life ==
Tomo In der Mühlen's parents, Johannes Willhelm in der Mühlen and Stana Kovačić in der Mühlen were architects.

== Career ==
In 1988, in der Mühlen founded IDM Music in Düsseldorf, Germany, a music publishing and rights management company.

In der Mühlen was one of the judges on the first four seasons of Tvoje lice zvuči poznato, the Croatian version of Your Face Sounds Familiar.

== Sources ==
- EX YU ROCK enciklopedija 1960-2006, Janjatović Petar; ISBN 978-86-905317-1-4
