= Sandra Bagarić =

Croatian opera singer (born 1979)

- Born: 5 April 1974 (age 52); Zenica, SR Bosnia and Herzegovina, SFR Yugoslavia
- Occupations: Actress, opera singer
- Years active: 1992–present

Sandra Bagarić (born 5 April 1974) is a Bosnian and Croatian opera singer and actress.

== Life and career ==
She was born in Zenica, Bosnia and Herzegovina where she attended the High School for Music. She continued her musical studies in Sarajevo, but due to the Bosnian War moved to Zagreb in 1992. In Zagreb she attended the Music Academy. She sang in many operettas including Srećko Albini's Madame Troubadour, Countess Maritza, Die Fledermaus, Boccaccio and One Song a Day Takes Mischief Away. She participated in Dora, the Croatian national final of Eurovision Song Contest 2007, together with the band Kraljevi ulice. They performed "Pjesma za novčić" (Song for a Coin) and finished second overall.

== Filmography ==
=== Television ===
Year	Title	Role	Notes
2002	Obećana zemlja		
2007	Naša mala klinika	Gospođa	Episode:"Sve crno"
2008	Zabranjena ljubav	Eleonora Šarić	Supporting role; 36 episodes
2015–2016	Samo ti pričaj	Dubravka Jakšić	

=== Dubbing ===
Year	Title	Role	Notes
2013	Legends of Oz: Dorothy's Return	China Princess	Croatian voice-dub
