= Your Face Sounds Familiar =

Television reality singing competition franchise

- Created by: Gestmusic
- Original work: Tu cara me suena (Spanish TV series)
- Owner: Banijay Entertainment

Films and television
- Television series: Your Face Sounds Familiar (see adaptations); Sub-franchises: Your Face Sounds Familiar Kids; Unnamed civilian-themed title

Miscellaneous
- Genre(s): Reality competition; singing; impersonation
- First aired: 28 September 2011; 15 years ago

Your Face Sounds Familiar (abbreviated as YFSF) is a television reality singing competition franchise. Originating from the Spanish programme Tu cara me suena created and produced by Gestmusic, as well as the format similar to predecessors like Soundmixshow, My Name is..., and Súper Sábado Sensacional segment Buscando una Estrella, it features celebrities and also civilians impersonating on their respective singers through competitive means.

== Format ==
The show challenges celebrities to perform as different iconic music artists every week, which are chosen by the show's "Randomiser". They are then judged by the panel of celebrity judges.

Each celebrity becomes transformed into a different singer each week, and performs an iconic song and dance routine well known by that particular singer. The "randomiser" can choose any older or younger artist available in the machine, or even a singer of the opposite sex, or a deceased singer.

The contestants are awarded points from the judges based on their singing and dance routines. After the jury vote, the contestants have to give a set of points to a fellow contestant of their choice. The total score of each contestant is counted by summing the points from judges and contestant's voting. In case of a tie, the judges will choose the weeks winner.

Whoever is at the top of the leaderboard at the end of the each show receives a cash prize for a charity of their choice and a further grand prize for the "series champion".

=== Blackface incidents ===
Throughout the course of its broadcast, the Your Face Sounds Familiar franchise has received heavy criticism due to its contestants' frequent usage of blackface. Prominent artists who have been impersonated via blackface include Drake, Tina Turner, Michael Jackson and Stevie Wonder. In March 2021, actor Tomasz Ciachorowski received backlash after performing Kanye West's single "Stronger" on the Polish iteration of the franchise while using blackface. The series defended Ciachorowski's impersonation and were "very surprised" by the negative reception, arguing: "The intention of each star performing on the show, as well as of the whole production team, is to recreate the original performance in the most precise manner, while honouring the original artist."

In accordance with the requirements of the franchise's owner Banijay, the Czech version of the series prohibited the usage of blackface in April 2021. Vojtěch Boháček, the edition's public relations coordinator, supported the decision and added that the show's goal "has always been and is to respect and celebrate artists around the world, regardless of their race, gender, sexual orientation or any other characteristics." Artists of color can still be impersonated but without the usage of blackface.

The Polish edition of the series received widespread criticism again in September 2023 after singer Kuba Szmajkowski and actress Pola Gonciarz used blackface to impersonate Kendrick Lamar and Beyoncé. As Szmajkowski performed Lamar's single "Humble", he also sported fake cornrows and repeatedly used nigga; the broadcast did not censor the racial term, although it did censor other profane language. In a statement obtained by The Hollywood Reporter, Banijay Group condemned its subsidiary, Endemol Shine Poland, for its execution of their franchise, stating that it "contradicts with our group's global values." The company shared that a "subsequent internal investigation is underway and the appropriate measures will be taken."

In 2021, the Chinese version of the series featured rapper Vava in blackface as Nicki Minaj.

== International versions ==
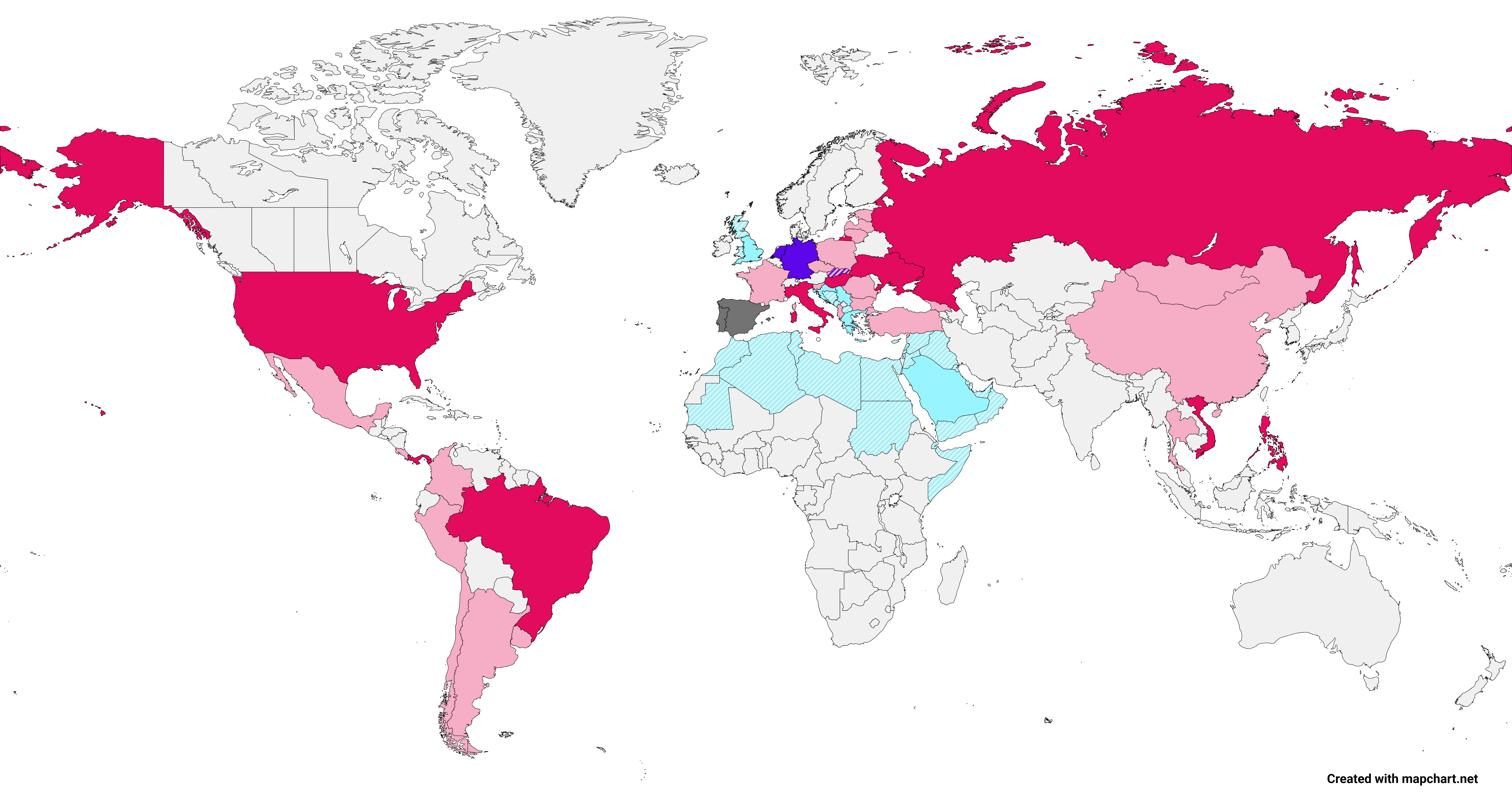
Your Face Sounds Familiar franchise locations: Originating countries from the main program and sub-franchises With a single adaptation of its own With multiple adaptations of its own With a single adaptation organized by multiple countries Countries that have adapted, but only aired as one-off specials

Tu cara me suena commenced franchising, when Portugal produced its first own locally-licensed adaptation titled A Tua Cara não me é Estranha, debuting on 22 January 2012. Also, the Chinese counterpart formally began to use the Your Face Sounds Familiar naming as a subtitle in its first episode on 12 July 2012, before Greece readapted it into a standalone main title. Since then, the YFSF franchise has produced two sub-franchises, 55 adaptations and three one-off specials, airing in 62 countries and territories.

Designations:
Active program	X Originating program	One-off special
Inactive program	T Technically including adaptation	AS All-star tournaments
Upcoming program or season	U Unofficial adaptation	Post Posthumous winner

=== Regular franchises ===
Country or region	Local title	Broadcaster(s)	Seasons and winners	Cast		
Country or region	Local title	Broadcaster(s)	Seasons and winners	Host(s)	Judges	Mentors
Albania	Your Face Sounds Familiar	TV Klan	#1, 2016: Anxhela Peristeri; #2, 2017: Beatrix Ramosaj	Alketa Vejsiu	Bojken Lako (s1); Bleona Qereti (s1); Arian Çani (s1–2); Albërie Hadërgjonaj (s2); Olta Gixhari (s2)	×
Angola and Mozambique	A Tua Cara não me é Estranha; Your face is familiar to me	Mundo Fox	#1, Jan.–Feb. 2019: Irina França; #2, Mar.–May 2019: Paulo Pascoal	Dicla Burity	Tânia Burity; Laton Cordeiro; Sílvio Nascimento	×
Arab world	شكلك مش غريب; You don't like strange	MBC 1; MBC Masr (EGY)	#1, 2014: Tamer Abdelmonem	Tony Abou Jaoudeh	Haifa Wehbe; Hakim; Mohamed Sami	Naji Sourati; Sami Khoury; Wadih Abi Raad
Argentina	Tu cara me suena Your Face Sounds Familiar	Telefe	#1, 2013: Laura Natalia Esquivel; #2, 2014: Ángela Torres; #3, 2015: Diana Amarilla	Alejandro Wiebe	Cacho Castaña (s1); Joaquín Galán (s1); Elizabeth Vernaci (s1–3); Enrique Pinti (s2); Humberto Tortonese (s3)	Sofía Sobral; Gustavo Zajac; Miguel Ángel Cherutti
Brazil (Note: Brazil: Esse Artista Sou Eu was an independently-aired programme on SBT, while Show Dos Famosos was a segment of Domingão do Faustão (s1–3) and later Domingão com Huck (s4) on TV Globo.)	Esse Artista Sou Eu; That artist is me!	SBT	#1, 2014: Vanessa Jackson	Marcío Ballas	Carlos Eduardo Miranda; Thomas Roth; Cynthia Zamorano	Marcelo Boffat; Blacy Gulfier; Netto Soares
Brazil	Show dos Famosos^{T} Show of the Famous	TV Globo	#1, 2017: Ícaro Silva; #2, 2018: Mumuzinho; #3, 2019: Ludmilla and Di Ferrero; #4, 2021: Gloria Groove	Fausto Silva (s1–3); Luciano Huck (s4)	Silvio de Abreu (s1); Miguel Falabella (s1–3); Cláudia Raia (s1–4); Boninho (s2–4); Preta Gil (s4)	Felipe Habib; Cris Moura; Sylvio Lemgruber; Maria Silvia Siqueira Campos
Bulgaria	Като две капки вода It's like two drops of water	Nova	13: #1, 2013: Raffi Bohosyan (1); #2, 2014: Nevena Bozukova; #3, 2015: Nencho Balabanov; #4, 2016: Kalin Vrachanski; #5, 2017: Mihaela Marinova; #6, 2018: Slavin Slavchev; #7, 2019: Stefan Ilchev; #8, 2020: Fiki; #9^{AS}, 2021: Raffi Bohosyan (2); #10, 2022: Krasimir Radkov; #11, 2023: Vladimir Mihaylov; #12, 2024: Vladimir Zombori; #13, 2025: Veniamin Dimitrov; #14, 2026: Daniel Peev – Dundi	Current; Dimitar Rachkov (s1–8, 10–14); Gerasim Georgiev (s9–14); Former; Vasil Vasilev (s1–9)	14: Current; Hilda Kazasyan (s1–4, 6–14); Dimitar Kovachev (s3–14); Veselin Marinov (s11–14); Azis (s14); Former; Lyuben Dilov Jr. (s1); Magarditch Halvadjian (s1–3); Militsa Gladnishka (s2); Julian Konstantinov (s2); Doni (s4); Yordanka Hristova (s5); Viktor Kalev (s5); Julian Vergov (s8–10); Assen Blatechki (s11); Lubo Kirov (s12–13)	Current; Aleksandra Eneva (s1–14); Vladimir Mihaylov (s12–14); Mihaela Marinova (s14); Former; Georgi Nizamov (s1–3, 7–10); Etienne Levi (s1–13); Militsa Gladnishka (s4–5); Stanimir Gumov (s6); Nencho Balabanov (s11)
Chile	Tu cara me suena Your Face Sounds Familiar	Mega	#1, 2012: Fernando Godoy	Luis Jara	Renata Bravo; Fernanda Hansen; Oscar Mediavilla; DJ Méndez	Renata Bravo; Daniel Guerrero; Verónica Lobos
China	百变大咖秀; Big Star Impersonation Show	Hunan TV	#1, Jul.–Sep. 2012: Qu Ying; #2, Oct.–Dec 2012: Dong Chengpeng; #3, Jan.–Mar. 2013: Huang Yixin; #4, Apr.–Jun. 2013: Sun Hao; #5, 2014: Yin Xiaotian; #6, 2021: Trina Lisa	Xie Na (s1–5); He Jiong (s1–6)	Bai Kainan (s1–6); Shen Ling (s1–6); Qu Ying (s1–6); Wowkie Zhang (s1–6); Jia Ling (s2–6); Joey Wong (s5)	Terry Lin; Jia Ling; Stephanie Shiao; Tan Weiwei; Wong Cho-lam; Bibi Zhou; Peer Zhu
Colombia	Tu cara me suena Your Face Sounds Familiar	Caracol TV	#1, 2015: Jimmy Vásquez	Dany Hoyos	Camilo Cifuentes; Martha Liliana López; Paola Turbay	Yanetsis Alfonso; Mono Casas; Alejandro Fonte; Alí Humar; Pocho Marulanda; Gina Medina; Carlos Ramírez
Costa Rica	Tu cara me suena Your Face Sounds Familiar	Teletica	#1, 2015: Luis Montalbert-Smith (Gandhi); #2, 2016: Christian Gómez; #3, 2017: Mauricio Herrera; #4, 2019: Ricardo Jiménez and Magdiel Ramírez; #5, 2020: Esteban Gómez; #6, 2021: Eduardo Quesada; #7, 2024: Jonathan Samuel	Edgar Murillo (s1–7); Keyla Sánchez (s4–6); Natalia Monge (s7)	Mau Meléndez (s1); Duvalier Quirós (s1–5); Eugenia Fuscaldo (s1–7); Alex Costa (s2–5, 7); Luis Montalbert-Smith (Gandhi) (s5–6); Kurt Dyer (s6); Natalia Monge (s6)	Beto Canessa (s1); Maripili Araya (s1–3); María Martha López (s1–3); Flor Urbina (s2–5); Yessenia Reyes (s4); Luis Montalbert-Smith (Gandhi) (s4–7); Javier Acuña Fallas (s5–7); Silvia Baltodano (s6–7)
Croatia; with Bosnia and Herzegovina and Montenegro (s6–9) (Note: Croatia: Tvoje lice zvuči poznato is also aired in Bosnia and Herzegovina and Montenegro (s6–9), although it both acquired the franchise rights with its Serbian programme of the same title (that also includes North Macedonia, in which all countries had been part of the former Yugoslavia).)	Tvoje lice zvuči poznato Your Face Sounds Familiar	Nova TV (HRV; 1–9); Nova BH (BIH; 6–9); Nova M (MNE; 6–9)	10: #1, 2014: Mario Petreković; #2, 2015: Saša Lozar (1); #3, 2016: Damir Kedžo; #4, 2017: Nives Celzijus; #5, 2018: Maja Bajamić; #6, 2020: Fabijan Pavao Medvešek; #7^{AS}, 2021: Saša Lozar (2); #8, 2024: Alen Bičević; #9, 2025: Stela Rade; #10, 2026: upcoming	Current; Igor Mešin (s1–5, 8–10); Filip Detelić (s8–10); Former; Rene Bitorajac (1–5); Frano Ridjan (s6–7); Maja Šuput (s6–7)	13: Current; Goran Navojec (s1, 3–4, 6–10); Mario Roth (s8–10); Enis Bešlagić (s8–10); Martina Stjepanović Meter (s10); Former; Sandra Bagarić (s1–4); Tomo in der Mühlen (s1–4); Branko Đurić (s2); Damir Kedžo (s5); Saša Lozar (s5); Mario Petreković (s5); Nives Celzijus (s5–7); Indira Levak (Colonia) (s6–7); Igor Mešin (s6–7)	Current; TBA (s10); Former; Sandra Bagarić; Igor Barberić; Ivana Husar; Martina Tomčić
Czech Republic	Tvoje tvář má známý hlas Your Face Sounds Familiar	TV Nova	#1, Mar.–Jun. 2016: Hana Holišová; #2, Sep.–Nov. 2016: Jan Cina; #3, Feb.–May 2017: Tatiana Dyková; #4, Sep.–Nov. 2017: Berenika Kohoutová; #5, 2018: Michaela Badinková; #6, 2019: Marek Lambora; #7, 2020: Jitka Čvančarová; #8, 2021: David Gránský; #9, 2022: Václav Kopta	Ondřej Sokol (s1–6, 8–9); Vladimír Polívka (s7); Aleš Háma (s8–9)	10: Jitka Čvančarová (s1); Janek Ledecký (s1–6); Jakub Kohák (s1–6, 8–9); Iva Pazderková (s2–3); Aleš Háma (s4–7); Ondřej Sokol (s7); Eva Burešová (7–9); Marek Lambora (s8); Petra Nesvačilová (s9); Daniel Dangl (s9)	14: Jiří Vejdělek (s1); Yemi A.D. (s1–6); Angeé Svobodová (s1–6); Linda Finková (s1–9); Iva Pazderková (s2–3); Martin Dejdar (s4); Aleš Háma (s5); Patrik Děrgel (s6); Jan Cina (s7); Zizoe (s7–8); Miňo Kereš (7–9); Jitka Čvančarová (s8); Adéla Gondíková (s9); Dalibor Gondík (s9)
Estonia	Su nägu kõlab tuttavalt Your Face Sounds Familiar	TV3	10: #1, Mar.–May 2013: Evelin Võigemast; #2, Oct.–Dec. 2013: Koit Toome; #3, 2014: Mart Müürisepp; #4, 2015: Juss Haasma; #5, 2016: Kalle Sepp; #6, 2017: Valter Soosalu; #7, 2018: Saara Kadak; #8, 2019: Madis Arro; #9, 2024: Reigo Tamm; #10, 2025: Alika Milova	Mart Sander (s1–3); Märt Avandi (s4–7); Sander Fox (s8); Karl-Erik Taukar (s9–10)	11: Eda-Ines Etti (s1); Elina Pähklimägi (s1–2); Andrus Vaarik (s1–7); Olav Osolin (s1–7); Tanja Mihhailova-Saar (s3–8); Mart Juur (s8); Mait Malmsten (s8); Maarja-Liis Ilus (s9); Jüri Makarov (s9); Liis Lemsalu (s10); Mihkel Raud (s10)	×
France	Un air de star A touch of star	M6	#1, 2013: Valérie Bègue	Karine Le Marchand	Liane Foly; Àngel Llàcer; Victoria Abril	Laura Treves
Georgia	ერთი ერთში One-in-one	GDS TV (s1–3); Imedi TV (s4)	#1, 2013: Helen Kalandadze; #2, 2014: Nino Dzotsenidze; #3, 2014–15: Salome Bakuradze; #4, 2015: Tamara Gachechiladze	Tornike Gogrichiani (s1); Ani Mamulashvili (s1); Kakha Kintsurashvili (s2–3); Ruska Makashvili (s2–3); Ilia Beroshvili (s4); Duta Skhirtladze (s4)	Kakhi Kandelaki (s1); Nanuka Khuskivadze (s1); Efrem Shaneli (s1); Zack Reece (s1–2); Zaza Kolelishvili (s2); Sisi Sami (s2, 4); Keti Dolidze (s4); Vasiko Odishvili (s4)	×
Germany	Sing wie dein Star; Sing like a star	Das Erste	13 September 2014: non-competitive	Jörg Pilawa	Ben Becker; Yvonne Catterfeld; Rolando Villazón	×
Greece and Cyprus	Your Face Sounds Familiar	ANT1	#1, 2013: Thanasis Alevras; #2, 2014: Giannis Savvidakis; #3, 2016: Giannis Kritikos; #4, 2017: Giannis Hatzigeorgiou; #5, 2019: Ian Stratis; #6, 2020: no winner; #7^{AS}, 2021: Tania Breazou; #8, 2026: Marilou Katsafadou	Current; Sakis Rouvas (s8); Former; Maria Bekatorou; (s1–7)	21: Current; Katerina Papoutsaki (s3, 7–8); George Theofanous (s8); Renos Haralambidis (s8); Rena Morfi (s8); Former; Gerasimos Gennatas (s1); Katerina Gagaki (s1–2); Bessy Malfa (s1–2); Alexandros Rigas (s1–2); Takis Zacharatos (s2, 7); Petros Filipidis (s3); Stamatis Fasoulis (s3–4); Nikos Moutsinas (s3–4); Elli Kokkinou (s4); Fotis Sergoulopoulos (s4); Mimi Denisi (s5); Alexis Georgoulis (s5–6); Giorgos Mazonakis (s5–6); Dimitris Starovas (s5–6); Mirka Papaconstantinou (s6); Kostis Maravegias (s7); Michalis Reppas (s7)	Current; Elena Alexandri (s4-6, 8); Sofi Zanninou (s7-8); Former; Victoria Chalkitis (s1-3); Sia Koskina (s1-2); Dimitris Korgialas (s3); Eleni Karakasi (s5); Alex Panagi (s7)
Hungary	Sztárban sztár Star of a star	TV2	12: #1, 2013: Zoltán Bereczki; #2, 2014: Dénes Pál; #3, 2015: Laci Gáspár; #4, 2016: Tamás Veréb; #5, 2017: Tamás Horváth; #6, 2018: Freddie; #7, 2020: Ádám Szabó; #8, 2022: Bence Vavra; #9, 2023: Petra Gubik; #10^{AS}, 2024: Peter Šramek; #11^{AS}, 2025: Heni Dér; #12, 2026: Current season	Sándor Friderikusz (s1); Attila Till (s2–11)	15: Current; Claudia Liptai (s1–6, 10–12); András Stohl (s5–6, 10–12); Szabi Papp (s5–9, 12); Ramóna Lékai-Kiss (s8–12); Former; Márk Lakatos (s1); András Hajós (s1–2, 4, 10–11); Majka (s1–6); Zoltán Bereczki (s2–4, 7); Henrik Havas (s3); Anita Ábel (s4); Babett Köllő (s7); Attila Kökény (s7–9); Zalán Makranczi (s8); Peti Marics (s9); Andi Tóth (s9)	Lajos Péter Túri (s1–4, 6); Kati Lajtai (s1–3, 6–8); Linda Holdampf (s1–11); Fanny Sárközy (s4); Betty Balássy (s5); Bernadett Rausch (s5); Ádám Volentics (s5); Aniko Szabó (s5, 7, 8)
Italy	Tale e quale show Just like a show	Rai 1	Regular: 15: #1, Apr.–May 2012: Serena Autieri; #2a, Sep.–Nov. 2012: Giò Di Tonno (1); #3a, 2013: Attilio Fontana (1); #4a, 2014: Serena Rossi (1); #5a, 2015: Francesco Cicchella; #6a, 2016: Silvia Mezzanotte; #7a, 2017: Marco Carta (1); #8a, 2018: Antonio Mezzancella (1); #9a, 2019: Agostino Penna; #10a, 2020: Pago; #11a, 2021: Gemelli di Guidonia (1); #12a, 2022: Antonino Spadaccino (1); #13a, 2023: Luca Gaudiano; #14, 2024: Verdiana Zangaro; #15, 2025: Tony Maiello; #16, 2026: TBA; Il Torneo: 12: #2b, 2012: Giò Di Tonno (2); #3b, 2013: Attilio Fontana (2); #4b, 2014: Serena Rossi (2); #5b, 2015: Valerio Scanu; #6b, 2016: Deborah Iurato; #7b, 2017: Marco Carta (2); #8b, 2018: Federico Angelucci; #9b, 2019: Antonio Mezzancella (2); #10b, 2020: Lidia Schillaci; #11b, 2021: Gemelli di Guidonia (2); #12b, 2022: Antonino Spadaccino (2); #13b, 2023: Ilaria Mongiovì	Carlo Conti	10: Claudio Lippi (s1–5); Christian De Sica (s1–4, 7); Loretta Goggi (s1–13); Gigi Proietti (s5); Claudio Amendola (s6); Enrico Montesano (s6–7); Vincenzo Salemme (s8–10); Giorgio Panariello (s8–15); Cristiano Malgioglio (s11–16); Alessia Marcuzzi (s14–15); Elettra Lamborghini (s16–); Alessandro Siani (s16–)	Silver Pozzoli (s1–7); Emanuela Aureli (s1–16); Maria Grazia Fontana (s1–16); Daniela Loi (s1–16); Fabrizio Mainini (s1–16); Pinuccio Pirazzoli (s1–16); Matteo Becucci (s8–16); Antonio Mezzancella (s11–16)
Latvia	Izklausies redzēts Sounds familiar	Current; 360TV (s5–); Former; TV3 (s1–4)	#1, 2014: Ralfs Eilands; #2, 2015: Kristaps Rasims; #3, 2016: Dināra Rudāne; #4, 2018: Nauris Brikmanis; #5, 2026: Current season	Lauris Reiniks (s1–3); Renārs Zeltiņš (s4); Māra Sleja (s5)	Baiba Sipeniece-Gavare (s1); Valdis Lūriņš (s1); Jānis Šipkēvics (s1–4); Lauris Subatnieks (s2); Jana Duļevska (s2–4); Artis Robežnieks (s3); Mārtiņš Egliens (s5); Jānis Šipkēvics (s5)	×
Lithuania	Muzikinė kaukė Musical disguise	BTV (s1–11); LNK (s12–14)	14: #1, 2012: Česlovas Gabalis; #2, 2013: Ruslanas Kirilkinas; #3, 2014: Lina Rastokaitė; #4, 2015: Martynas Kavaliauskas; #5, 2016: Rūta Ščiogolevaitė; #6, 2017: Amberlife; #7, 2018–19: KaYra; #8, 2019–20: Aleksandra Metalnikova; #9, 2021: Rokas Petrauskas; #10, 2022: Linas Vaitkevičius; #11, 2023: Norbert Liatkovski; #12, 2024: Liepa Mondeikaitė-Norkevičienė; #13, 2025: Kasparas Varanavičius; #14, 2026: ongoing	Current; Arnas Ašmonas (s12–14); Ugnė Siparė (s12–14); Former; Arūnas Sakalauskas (s1–2); Algis Ramanauskas (s3–7); Indrė Kavaliauskaitė-Morkūnienė (s8–11); Simonas Storpirštis (s8–11)	20: Current; Dainius Kazlauskas (s12–14); Toma Vaškevičiūtė (s12–14); Paulius Vaitiekunas (s13–14); Monika Liu (s14); Former; Marius Gelažnikas (s1); Kristina Kazlauskaitė (s1); Birutė Petrikytė (s1); Arūnas Valinskas (s1); Radži (s3); Asta Baukutė (s3–4); Mantas Stonkus (s3–5); Vytenis Pauliukaitis (s3–10); Livija Gradauskienė (s5–12); Ingrida Valinskienė (s5–10); Alanas Chošnau (s6); Džiugas Siaurusaitis (s7); Paul de Miko (s8); Jonas Sakalauskas (s10); Jeronimas Milius (Soul Stealer) (s12); Indrė Kavaliauskaitė-Morkūnienė (s13)	×
Mongolia	Яг түүн шиг Just like them	EduTV	#1, 2016: Purevjavyn Bayartsengel; #2, 2017: Törbatyn Barkhüü (1); #3, 2018: Batlutyn Natsagdorj; #4^{AS}, 2019: Törbatyn Barkhüü (2)	Dorjiin Bold; Enkhbaataryn Tsolmonbayar	Nanjidyn Onon (s1–2); Gendendaramyn Gankhüü (s1, 3–4); Badar-Uugany Naranzun (s2); Amarkhuu Borkhuu (s3); Khandjavyn Oyuunbileg (s3); Dashzevegiin Jargalsaikhan (s4); Oidovjamtsyn Enkhtuul (s4)	×
Netherlands	Your Face Sounds Familiar	RTL 4	29 December 2012: Charly Luske	Winston Gerschtanowitz	×	
Panama	Tu cara me suena Your Face Sounds Familiar	TVN	#1, 2013: Flex; #2, 2014: Karen Peralta; #3, 2015: Luis Pérez; #4, 2017: Chollykid; #5, 2018: Oriel Ospina; #6, 2019: Dezdy Ninoshka Perez Hilton; #7, 2025: La Ministra; #8, 2026: Rikiplops; #9, 2027: upcoming	Jovana Michelle (s1–3); Eddy Vásquez (s1–7); Nathy González (s5–7)	Wyznick Ortega (s1–3); Paulette Thomas (s1–5); Miguel Esteban González (s1–7); Emilio Regueira (s1–7); Franklyn Robinson (s4); Sandra Sandoval (s5–7); Nando Boom (s6)	×
Peru	Tu cara me suena Your Face Sounds Familiar	Latina TV	#1, 2013–14: Érika Villalobos	Adolfo Aguilar	Mónica Delta; Bettina Oneto; Raúl Romero; Ricky Tosso	×
Philippines (Note: Philippines: Following the second broadcast shutdown of ABS-CBN, YFSF moved to Kapamilya Channel (s3–4), along with simulcasts on A2Z (s3–4), TV5 (s4 until ep. 26), and All TV (rest of s4).)	Your Face Sounds Familiar	ABS-CBN (s1–2); Kapamilya Channel (s3–4); A2Z (s3–4); TV5 (s4); All TV (s4)	#1, Mar.–Jun. 2015: Melai Cantiveros; #2, Sep.–Dec. 2015: Denise Laurel; #3, 2021: Klarisse de Guzman; #4, 2025–26: JMielle	Billy Crawford (s1–2); Melai Cantiveros (s2); Luis Manzano (s3); Jhong Hilario (s4); Vhong Navarro (s4)	Jed Madela (s1–2); Sharon Cuneta (s1–4); Gary Valenciano (s1–4); Ogie Alcasid (s3–4)	Georcelle Dapat-Sy (GeForce) (s1–2); Annie Quintos (The Company) (s1–2); Jed Madela (s3); Nyoy Volante (s3–4); Klarisse de Guzman (s4)
Poland	Twoja twarz brzmi znajomo Your Face Sounds Familiar	Polsat	23: #1, Mar.–Apr. 2014: Katarzyna Skrzynecka; #2, Sep.–Nov. 2014: Marek Kaliszuk; #3, Mar.–May 2015: Stefano Terrazzino; #4, Sep.–Nov. 2015: Bartłomiej Kasprzykowski; #5, Mar.–May 2016: Aleksandra Szwed; #6, Sep.–Nov. 2016: Maria Tyszkiewicz; #7, Mar.–May 2017: Kasia Popowska; #8, Sep.–Nov. 2017: Kacper Kuszewski; #9, Mar.–May 2018: Filip Lato (1); #10, Sep.–Nov. 2018: Mateusz Ziółko; #11, Feb.–May 2019: Kazimierz Mazur; #12, Sep.–Nov. 2019: Adam Strycharczuk; #13, 2020: Czadoman; #14, Mar.–May 2021: Lesław Żurek; #15, Sep.–Nov. 2021: Robert Janowski; #16, Mar.–May 2022: Danzel; #17, Sep.–Nov. 2022: Kasia Wilk; #18, Mar.–May 2023: Oskar Cyms; #19, Sep.–Nov. 2023: Kuba Szmajkowski; #20^{AS}, Mar.–May 2024: Filip Lato (2); #21, Sep.–Nov. 2024: Kuba Szyperski; #22, 2025: Natalia Muianga; #23, 2026: Maria Sadowska	Current; Maciej Rock (s18–23); Agnieszka Popielewicz (s21–23); Former; Piotr Gąsowski (s1–17); Maciej Dowbor (s1–20)	16: Current; Małgorzata Walewska (s1–23); Piotr Gąsowski (s20–23); Justyna Steczkowska (s21–23); Stefano Terrazzino (s21–23); Former; Katarzyna Kwiatkowska (s1); DJ Adamus (s1–4); Paweł Królikowski (s1–12); Katarzyna Skrzynecka (s2–17); Bartłomiej Kasprzykowski (s5–8); Kacper Kuszewski (s9–14); Adam Strycharczuk (s13–14); Gromee (s15); Michał Wiśniewski (s15–17); Krzysztof Cugowski (s16); Robert Janowski (s17–20); Paweł Domagała (s18–19)	22: Current; Agnieszka Hekiert (s1–23); Maciej Zakliczyński (s19–23); Former; Marcin Olszewski (s1); Alicja Węgorzewska-Whiskerd (s1); Julia Chmielnik (s1–4); Agnieszka Boruta (s1–6); Krzysztof Adamski (s1–18); Piotr Hajduk (s3); Bartosz Caboń (s4); Nika Lubowicz (s4–6, 10–20); Paweł Jasionowski (s5); Agnieszka Wilczyńska (s5–6); Marcin Miller (s6); Anna Ozner (s7); Olga Szomańska (s7); Adam Beta (s7–8, 12–15); Izabela Puk (s7–20); Ewelina Kordy (s8); Ewelina Adamska-Porczyk (s12); Ernestina Papazyan (s12–15); Adrianna Piechówka (s12–18); Igor Leonik (s18–20)
Portugal	A Tua Cara não me é Estranha; Your face is familiar to me	TVI	#1, Jan.–Apr. 2012: João Paulo Rodrigues; #2, Apr.–Jun. 2012: Luciana Abreu; #3, 2013: Wanda Stuart; #4, 2016: David Antunes; #5, 2018: Sissi Martins; #6, 2019: Soraia Tavares	Cristina Ferreira (s1–5); Manuel Luís Goucha (s1–5); Maria Cerqueira Gomes (s6)	António Sala (s1–3); Alexandra Lencastre (s1–2, 4–5); Luís Jardim (s1–5); José Carlos Pereira (s1–5); Fernanda Serrano (s3); Rui Pêgo (s6); Fernando Pereira (s6); Rita Redshoes (s6)	×
Romania	Te cunosc de undeva! I know you from somewhere!	Antena 1	21: #1, Mar.–May 2012: CRBL; #2, Sep.–Dec. 2012: George Papagheorghe; #3, Feb.–May 2013: Pepe (1); #4, Sep.–Dec. 2013: Pepe (2); #5, Feb.–May 2014: Alex Velea; #6^{AS}, Sep.–Dec. 2014: Maria Buză; #7, Feb.–May 2015: Florin Cezar Ouatu; #8, Sep.–Dec. 2015: Florin Ristei (1); #9, Feb.–May 2016: Liviu Teodorescu; #10, Sep.–Dec. 2016: Şerban Copot; #11, Feb.–Jun. 2017: Andrei Ștefănescu and Liviu Vârciu; #12, Sep.–Dec. 2017: Alin Pascal; #13, 2018: Barbara Isasi; #14, 2019: Bella Santiago; #15, 2020: AMI; #16, 2021: Romică Țociu and Adriana Trandafir; #17, Apr.–Jul. 2022: Emi și Cuza; #18, Sep.–Dec. 2022: Emilian Nechifor (1) and Andrei Ursu (1); #19, 2023: Emilian Nechifor (2) and Andrei Ursu (2); #20, 2024: Ilona Brezoianu and Florin Ristei (2); #21, 2025: Cristian Porcari and Mark Stam	Cosmin Seleși (s1–16); Alina Pușcaș (s1–21); Pepe (s17–21)	10: Andrei Aradits (s1–12); Andreea Bălan (s1–4, 6–20); Ozana Barabancea (s1–4, 6–21); Aurelian Temişan (s1–4, 6–21); Monica Anghel (s5); Horia Brenciu (s5); Pepe (s5); Cristi Iacob (s13–20); Mihai Petre (s19–21); Ilona Brezoianu (s21)	×
Russia	Один в один! One to one!	Pervy Kanal (s1); Rossiya-1 (s2–6)	#1, 2013: Alexey Chumakov (1); #2, 2014: Vitaly Gogunsky; #3, 2015: Ruslan Alekhno → Batyrkhan Shukenov^{Post}; #4^{AS}, 2016: Alexey Chumakov (2); #5, 2019: Pavel Kryukov; #6, 2025: Maria Zaitseva	Nonna Grishayeva (s1); Alexander Oleshko (s1, 5); Yulia Kovalchuk (s2–4); Igor Vernik (s2–5); Nikolay Baskov (s6); Klava Koka (s6)	13: Lyubov Kazarnovskaya (s1); Gennady Khazanov (s1); Aleksandr Revva (s1); Lyudmila Artemyeva (s1, 3–4); Olga Borodina (s2); Maksim Galkin (s2–3); Yury Stoyanov (s2–6); Alexey Chumakov (s2, 6); Hibla Gerzmava (s3); Larisa Dolina (s4); Tigran Keosayan (s4); Marina Fedunkiv (s5); Timur Rodriguez (s5); Marina Meshcheryakova (s5–6)	13: Danila Dunayev (s1); Maria Struve (s1); Marina Polteva (s1); Sergei Shesteperov (s1–5); Eldar Lebedev (s2); Natalia Efimenko (s2–5); Anastasia Sobachkina (s3–4); Anna Grotesk (s5); Leonid Lavrosky-Garcia (s5); Ilya Padzina (s5); Andrey Barinov (s6); Ksenia Korobkova (s6); Viktoria Kuzmina (s6)
Russia	Точь-в-точь^{TU} Right to a tee	Pervy Kanal	#1, 2014: Irina Dubtsova and Nikita Presnyakov (2); #2, 2015: Aziza; #3, 2015–16: Evgeny Dyatlov and Maksim Galkin; #4, 2016: Elena Maksimova; #5, 2021: Anastasia Spiridonova; #6, 2024: Darya Antonyuk and Svetlana Galka	Alexander Oleshko	10: Anna Bolshova (s1); Lyubov Kazarnovskaya (s1–4); Gennady Khazanov (s1–4); Leonid Yarmolnik (s1–6); Maksim Averin (s2–3, 5); Mikhail Boyarsky (s4); Maksim Galkin (s5); Vadim Galygin (s6); Sergey Minaev (s6); Eva Polna (s6)	Danila Dunaev (s1, 5); Natella Ivlieva (s1–6); Ekaterina Kotova (s1–6); Slava Kulaev (s1–6); Sergey Mandrik (s1–6); Marina Polteva (s1–6); Yuri Zhukov (s1–6); Andrey Droznin (s2–6); Boris Tyomkin (s5)
Serbia; with Bosnia and Herzegovina, Montenegro and North Macedonia	Tvoje lice zvuči poznato Your Face Sounds Familiar	Prva (SRB); FTV (BIH); Prva CG (MNE); Sitel (MKD)	#1, 2013: Ana Kokić; #2, 2014: Bane Mojićević; #3, 2016: Daniel Kajmakoski(1); #4, 2017: Stevan Anđelković; #5, 2019: Daniel Kajmakoski (2) and Ivana Peters	Petar Strugar (s1); Marija Kilibarda (s1–3, 5); Bojan Ivković (s2); Nina Seničar (s4)	11: Katarina Radivojević (s1); Marija Mihajlović (s1–2); Ivan Ivanović (s1–3); Branko Đurić (s2, 4); Vlado Georgiev (s3); Ana Kokić (s3); Andrija Milošević (s4); Aleksandra Radović (s4); Dušan Alagić (s5); Uroš Đurić (s5); Dubravka Mijatović (s5)	×
Slovakia	Tvoja tvár znie povedome Your Face Sounds Familiar	Markíza	#1, Mar.–May 2016: Lukáš Adamec; #2, Sep.–Nov. 2016: Mária Čírová; #3, 2017: Peter Brajerčík; #4, 2018: Dárius Koči; #5, 2019: Dávid Hartl; #6, 2021: Martin Klinčúch; #7, 2022: Viktória Ráková	Martin Rausch (s1–4); Martin Nikodým (s5–7)	Daniel Dangl (s1–5); Zuzana Fialová (s1–5); Mário Kollár (Desmod) (s1–7); Juraj Tabaček (s3); Andrej Bičan (s4); Zuzana Šebová (s5–7); Lujza Garajová Schrameková (s6); Marián Čekovský (s7); Attila Végh (s7)	Zuzana Fialová (s1–5); Jana Daňová-Bugalová (s1, 3–7); Miňo Kereš (s1–7); Barbora Švidraňová (s2); Peter Brajerčík (s6); Juraj Kemka (s7)
Slovenia	Znan obraz ima svoj glas A familiar face has its own voice	Pop	#1, 2014: Tomaž Klepač; #2, 2015: Klemen Bunderla; #3, 2016: Tilen Artač; #4, 2017: Luka Sešek; #5, 2019: Eva Boto; #6, 2022: BQL	Denis Avdić (s1–5); Peter Poles (s6); Sašo Stare (s6)	10: Boštjan Gombač (s1); Tanja Ribič (s1–4); Irena Yebuah Tiran (s1–4); Gojmir Lešnjak (s2–4); Lara Komar (s5); Marko Miladinović (s5); Lea Sirk (s5); Helena Blagne (s6); Ana Maria Mitič (s6); Andrej Škufca (s6)	Tanja Ribič (s1); Miha Krušič (s1–6); Darja Švajger (s1–6); Lucija Ćirović (s2); Gašper Tič (s3); Tilen Artač (s4–5); Gorka Berden (s6)
Spain	Tu cara me suena Your Face Sounds Familiar	Antena 3	13: #1, 2011: Angy Fernández; #2, 2012–13: Roko; #3, 2013–14: Edurne; #4, 2015–16: Ruth Lorenzo; #5, 2016–17: Blas Cantó; #6, 2017–18: Miquel Fernández; #7, 2018–19: María Villalón; #8, 2020–21: Jorge González; #9, 2021–22: Agoney; #10, 2023: Miriam Rodríguez; #11, 2024: David Bustamante; #12, 2025: Melani García; #13, 2026: J Kabello	Manel Fuentes	Carolina Cerezuela (s1–2); Mónica Naranjo (s1–3); Carlos Latre (s1–11); Àngel Llàcer (s1–13); Marta Sánchez (s3); Shaila Dúrcal (s4); Lolita Flores (s4–13); Chenoa (s5–13); Florentino Fernández (s12-13)	Miryam Benedited; Àngel Llàcer; Arnau Vilà
Thailand	Sing Your Face Off	Channel 7	#1, 2015: Karnklao Duaysianklao; #2, 2016: Atsadaporn Siriwattanakul; #3, 2017: #4, 2018–19:	Surivipa Kultangwattana	×	
Turkey	Benzemez Kimse Sana; No one likes you	Star TV (s1, 3); Show TV (s2)	#1, 2012: Ümit Erdim; #2, 2013: Bahadır Efe; #3, 2015: Eser Eyüboğlu	Murat Başoğlu	Hande Ataizi (s1); Erol Evgin (s1–2); Seyfi Dursunoğlu (s1–3); Demet Akbağ (s2); Nükhet Duru (s3); Ümit Erdim (s3)	Aytunç Bentürk; Süeda Çil; Fatih Ertür; Attila Özdemiroğlu
Ukraine	ШОУМАSТГОУОН; Show must go on	Novyi Kanal	#1, 2012: Nikita Presnyakov (1)	Masha Efrosynina	Olha Freimut; Yuri Galtsev; Olena Hrebeniuk; Vyacheslav Manucharov	Oleg Bodnarchuk; Sergei Shesteperov
Ukraine	Як дві краплі Like two drops	Ukraina	#1, 2013: Olya Polyakova	Anton Lirnik; Anastasia Zavorotnyuk	Lyudmila Artemyeva; Susanna Chakhoian; Andriy Molochnyi; Roman Viktyuk	×
United Kingdom	Your Face Sounds Familiar	ITV	#1, 2013: Natalie Anderson	Alesha Dixon; Paddy McGuinness	Emma Bunton; Julian Clary	Yvie Burnett; Elizabeth Honan
United States	Sing Your Face Off (English version)	ABC	#1, 2014: China Anne McClain	John Barrowman	Debbie Gibson; Darrell Hammond	Roger Love; Tabitha Dumo
United States	Tu cara me suena Your Face Sounds Familiar (Spanish version)	Univision	#1, 2020: El Dasa; #2, 2022: Michael Stuart	Rafael Araneda; Ana Brenda Contreras	Kany García (s1); Reik (s1); Charytín Goyco (s1–2); Angélica Vale (s1–2); Edén Muñoz (s2); Víctor Manuelle (s2)	×
Uruguay	Tu cara me suena Your Face Sounds Familiar	Teledoce	#1, Mar.–Apr. 2025: Nacho Obes; #2, May–Jun. 2025: Josefina Damiani	Maximiliano de la Cruz	Claudia Fernández; Lucía Rodríguez; Santiago Tavella	×
Vietnam (Note: Vietnam: Gương mặt thân quen has unique concepts for each respective season — the 7th season featured "past and future" performers, while the 9th season had a mix of child and adult performers.)	Gương mặt thân quen Familiar faces	VTV3	#1, 2013: Khởi My; #2, 2014: Hoài Lâm; #3, 2015: Thanh Duy; #4, 2016: Bạch Công Khanh; #5, 2017: Jun Phạm; #6, 2018: Duy Khánh; #7, 2019–20: Nhật Thủy; #8, 2020–21: Phạm Lịch; #9 (Adults + Kids), 2022–23: Nam Phong	Thanh Bạch (s1–2, 7); Đại Nghĩa (s3–5); Quang Bảo (s6); Duy Khánh (s8); Long Chun (s9)	Đức Huy (s1–5); Hoài Linh (s1–5); Mỹ Linh (s1–5, 8); Đàm Vĩnh Hưng (s6); Kim Oanh (s6); Quang Linh (s6–7); Hồ Ngọc Hà (s7); Đại Nghĩa (s8–9); Hòa Minzy (s9)	×

=== Sub-franchises ===
Country or region	Local title	Broadcaster(s)	Seasons and winners	Cast		
Country or region	Local title	Broadcaster(s)	Seasons and winners	Host(s)	Judges	Mentors
Kids adaptations
Hungary	Sztárban sztár +1 kicsi Star of a star with kids	TV2	#1, 2016–17: Vivien Varga and Dénes Pál; #2, 2017–18: Szabolcs Varga and Tamás Vastag	Atilla Till	Adél Csobot (s1); Barna Pély (s1); Anita Ábel (s1–2); Ferenc Rákóczi (s1–2); Viktor Király (s2); Vera Tóth (s2)	Betty Balássy; Aniko Szabó; Lajos Péter Túri
Panama	Tu cara me suena kids Your Face Sounds Familiar Kids	TVN	#1, 2016: Genesis Mariam Quiel and Nilena Zisopulos	Massiel Más; Eddy Vásquez	Miguel Esteban González; Wyznick Ortega; Emilio Regueira; Paulette Thomas	×
Philippines	Your Face Sounds Familiar Kids	ABS-CBN	#1, 2017: Awra Briguela; #2, 2018: TNT Boys	Billy Crawford	Ogie Alcasid; Sharon Cuneta; Gary Valenciano	Georcelle Dapat-Sy (GeForce) (s1); Annie Quintos (The Company) (s1); Jed Madela (s2); Nyoy Volante (s2)
Portugal	A Tua Cara não me é Estranha Kids^{X} Your face is familiar to me kids	TVI	#1, 2014: Diana Martins	Cristina Ferreira; Manuel Luís Goucha	Luís Jardim; Alexandra Lencastre; José Carlos Pereira; António Sala	Fernando Fernandes; Diana Monteiro; Toy; Mico da Câmara Pereira; Romana; Vanessa Silva; Ricardo Soler; Wanda Stuart
Slovakia	Tvoja mini tvár znie povedome Your Face Sounds Familiar Kids	Markíza	16 May 2021: Maroš Baňas	Martin Nikodým	Marián Čekovský; Lujza Garajová Schrameková; Mário Kollár; Zlatica Švajdová-Puškárová	Peter Brajerčík; Jana Daňová-Bugalová; Miňo Kereš
Spain	Tu cara me suena mini Your Face Sounds Familiar Kids	Antena 3	#1, 2014: Abril Montmany and Xuso Jones	Manel Fuentes	Carlos Latre; Àngel Llàcer; Mónica Naranjo	Miryam Benedited; Àngel Llàcer; Arnau Vilà
Vietnam	Gương mặt thân quen Nhí; Familiar faces kids	VTV3	#1, 2014: Ju Uyên Nhi and Kyo York; #2, 2015: Hoàng Quân and Khương Ngọc; #3, 2016: Mai Chi and Lê Giang; #4, 2017: Thụy Bình	Đại Nghĩa	Hoài Linh (s1–3); Hồng Vân (s1–3); Mỹ Linh (s1–3); Hiền Thục (s4); Xuân Bắc (s4)	×
Civilian adaptations
Hungary	Sztárban sztár leszek! I will become a star of a star!	TV2	#1, 2019: Viktória Békefi; #2, 2021: István Csiszár; #3, 2022: Dani Kökény; #4, 2023: Kristóf Karapancsev	Atilla Till	Zoltán Bereczki (s1); Tamás Horváth (s1); Joci Pápai (s1–4); Gabi Tóth (s1–4); Babett Köllő (s2–4); Majka (s2–4)	×
Italy	Tali e quali Look-a-like	Rai 1	#1, 2019: Veronica Perseo; #2, 2022: Daniele Quartapelle; #3, 2023: Roy Paladini; #4, 2024: Francesca La Colla; #5, 2026: ongoing	Current; Nicola Savino (s5); Former; Carlo Conti (s1–4)	Current; Cristiano Malgioglio (s2–5); Massimo Lopez (s5); Alessia Marcuzzi (s5); Former; Vincenzo Salemme (s1); Loretta Goggi (s1–4); Giorgio Panariello (s1–4)	Emanuela Aureli; Matteo Becucci; Maria Grazia Fontana; Daniela Loi; Fabrizio Mainini; Antonio Mezzancella; Pinuccio Pirazzoli
Mexico	Soy tu doble I'm your double	Azteca Uno	#1, 2012: Adults: César Pérez; Kids: Juan Carlos Cortés; #2, 2014: Alex Garza	Fernando Arau (s1); Ingrid Coronado (s1); Alfonso de Anda (s2)	Daniel Bisogno (s1); Pillín Guzmán (s1); Gabriela Spanic (s1); Luis Felipe Tovar (s1); Niurka Marcos (s2); Ese Wey (s2); Héctor Martínez (s2); Cynthia Rodríguez (s2)	×
Spain	Tu cara no me suena todavía^{X} Your Face Sounds Unfamiliar	Antena 3	#1, 2017: Germán Scasso	Manel Fuentes	Chenoa; Àngel Llàcer; Miki Nadal; Mónica Naranjo	×

== See also ==
- Soundmixshow – similar concept that debuted in the Netherlands in 1985, on KRO.
- Stars in Their Eyes – British adaptation of Soundmixshow, originally from 1990 to 2006, on ITV.
