= Your Face Sounds Familiar (Mongolian TV series) =

- Yg tuun shig
- Based on: Your Face Sounds Familiar
- Developed by: Endemol
- Judges: Nanjid Onon; Gendendaram Gankhuu; Badruugan Naranzun
- Country of origin: Mongolia
- Original language: Mongolian
- No. of seasons: 1, upcoming 1 season
- No. of episodes: 10

Original release
- Network: Edutainment TV
- Release: May 8, 2016 – present

Yag Tuun Shig (Mongolian: Яг түүн шиг) is a Mongolian talent show based on the Spanish series Your Face Sounds Familiar. The show debuted on 8 May 2016 on Edutainment TV and its first season ended in June 2016.

The second season started on 2 April 2017 on Edutainment TV, and concluded on June 4, 2017. Barkhuu Turbat was announced as the winner of the second season. The show announced its cast for the third season via social media. The third season of Yg Tuun Shig premiered on May 6, 2018, with changes on judging panel. The judge from the first season and the finalist of season two of Yag Tuun Shig, Gankhuu Gendendaram, has returned as a judge for the third season. The previous judges, Onon Nanjid and Naranzun Badar-Uugan, have replaced by season-one runner-up, singer Amarkhuu Borkuu and the show's guest judge from previous two seasons, singer Oyunbileg Khandjav.

== Seasons ==
Season	Premiere	Finale	Winner	Second place	Host(s)	Judges
1	8 May 2016	10 July 2016	Bayartsengel	Amarkhuu Borkhuu	Tsolmonbayr Enkhbaatar; Bold Dorj	Gendendaram Gankhuu; Nanjid Onon
2	2 April 2017	4 June 2017	Barkhuu Turbat	Gantogoo Sergelen	Tsolmonbayr Enkhbaatar; Bold Dorj	Gendendaram Gankhuu; Nanjid Onon
3	6 May 2018	8 July 2018	Natsagdorj	Temuujin Sergelen	Tsolmonbayr Enkhbaatar; Bold Dorj	Gankhuu Gendendaram; Oyunbileg Khandjav; Amarkhuu Borkhuu
