= Your Face Sounds Familiar (Slovenian TV series) =

Slovenian TV show

Your Face Sounds Familiar (Slovenian: Znan obraz ima svoj glas, also abbreviated as ZOISG) is the Slovenian version of the popular shows Tu cara me suena, Spanish broadcasters Antena 3. The first season premiered on 30 March 2014. The fifth season ended on 15 December 2019. The five seasons from 2014 to 2019 were hosted by Denis Avdić. In 2017, he received the Slovenian media award žarometi for his work as the best host of an entertainment show in 2016.

An important part of the shows are judges, that comment on and (in addition to the spectators) assess the performances of the contestants. In the first season the standing judges were Irena Yebuah Tiran (opera singer), Boštjan Gombač (clarinetist) and Tanja Dj. Ribič (actress and singer). In the second season Boštjan Gombač replaced the player Gojmir Lešnjak.

In February 2022 POP TV has announced that the sixth season will be running, but it will be coming with a lot of changes. The host Denis Avdić was replaced with Peter Poles and Sašo Stare, as Avdić started working for Radio 1 TV. Three judges that replaced Lešnjak, Yeboah Tiran and Djurić Ribič are Ana Marija Mitić (actress and host), Helena Blagne (singer) and Andrej Škufca (dancer).

== Description ==
In the show, eight celebrities were primarily transformed in a variety of Slovene and foreign artists. In each show wins the one who at the end of the collect the most points. Every week just before submission of one of the contestants gets hidden mission. Its identity is disclosed only at the end of the award. If a contestant with a mission to win, in the fund for the young people and hopes to contribute €3000, the second place €1000, third place €1000, ranking between the 4. and 8. the city means €500, which contributes to the POP TV. In the last award will be the total amount of the Insurance company Triglav doubled. Four of the best contestants, who will be in the first eleven Japan achieved the most points, will be competed in the final of the show, which will be 15. June 2014.[2] Scoring Scored so that the jury first assesses all eight appearances by the example of evrovizijskega scoring (4, 5, 6, 7, 8, 9, 10 and 12). Later each of the participants awarded their 5 points contestant, that it has attracted. Then all the points together and turn them in evrovizijske point (the best has 12, worst receives a 4). During the whole of the award vote also viewers, that grant points 4–12. At the end is whoever has the most points, the winner of the individual award.

== Overview of the seasons ==
Season	Episodes	Start date	End date	Winner	Finalists
1.	12	30 March 2014	15 June 2014	Tomaž Klepač	Tomaž Ahačič, Vlado Pilja, Eva Hren
2.	12	1 March 2015	17 May 2015	Klemen Bunderla	
3.	12	6 March 2016	29 May 2016	Tilen Artač	

The participants in the preparations for the transformation of help to the teacher of singing (Darja Švajger), a teacher of the game (1. season: Tanja Ribič, 2.: Lucija Ćirović, 3.: Gašper Tič) and choreographer (Miha Krušič).
