= Mongolia's Next Top Model season 1 =

Season of television series in Mongolian modeling show

Mongolia's Next Top Model
- Season 1
- Starring: Host and judge Nora Dagva Judge Nansalmaa Tumur Judge Orgil Makhaan Produser Sodgerel Ulziikhutag TOP MODEL : Ariunbuyan
- No. of episodes: 17

Release
- Original network: Edutainment TV
- Original release: January 15 – March 12, 2017

Season chronology
- Next → Season 2

The first cycle of Mongolia's Next Top Model is a reality television show based on the American franchise America's Next Top Model in which a number of aspiring models compete for the title of "Mongolia's Next Top Model" and a chance to start their career in the modeling industry in Mongolia and internationally. The show is featured and produced on Edutainment TV, co-produced by Sodgerel Ulziikhutag. Host and judges are former model Nora Dagva, actor Orgil Makhaan and Nansalmaa Tumur.

The prizes for this cycle were: a 2-year modeling contract with Looque Models Agency in Singapore, a 1-year contract with G Mobile, a cash prize of ₮20.000.000 (about US$7,600), and a trip to Paris.

The winner is 20-year-old Tserendolgor Battsengel from Ulaanbaatar.

== Contestants ==
(ages stated are at start of contest)

Contestant	Age	Height	Hometown	Finish	Place
Ikhertsetseg Ganbold	21	1.71 m (5 ft 7 1/2 in)	Dornogovi Province	Episode 2	16
Tümenjargal Batjargal	23	1.71 m (5 ft 7 1/2 in)	Ulaanbaatar	Episode 2	15
Büjinlkham Dorjsuren	21	1.76 m (5 ft 9 1/2 in)	Orkhon Province	Episode 3	14
Benderïya Monkhoo	18	1.80 m (5 ft 11 in)	Ulaanbaatar	Episode 4	13
Dashbaljid Munkhzul	20	1.78 m (5 ft 10 in)	Ulaanbaatar	Episode 4	12
Jagzmaa Bayarjargal	17	1.75 m (5 ft 9 in)	Ulaanbaatar	Episode 6	11
Anu-Üjin Otgonbayar	17	1.70 m (5 ft 7 in)	Ulaanbaatar	Episode 7	10
Mandkhai Shumiyaa	19	1.73 m (5 ft 8 in)	Ulaanbaatar	Episode 8	9
Sarangerel Tumbish	22	1.83 m (6 ft 0 in)	Ulaanbaatar	Episode 9	8
Bat-Oÿuun Battsetseg	22	1.77 m (5 ft 9 1/2 in)	Selenge Province	Episode 11	7
Ijiltsetseg Ganbold	21	1.72 m (5 ft 7 1/2 in)	Dornogovi Province	Episode 12	6
Ankhbayar Munkh-Erdene	19	1.81 m (5 ft 11 1/2 in)	Orkhon Province	Episode 13	5
Oÿuunbileg Enkh-Amgalan	22	1.82 m (5 ft 11 1/2 in)	Ulaanbaatar	Episode 14	4
Nomin-Erdene Tuvshinjargal	20	1.75 m (5 ft 9 in)	Ulaanbaatar	Episode 17	3
Baljidmaa Ÿundenbat	20	1.82 m (5 ft 11 1/2 in)	Ulaanbaatar	Episode 17	2
Tserendolgor Battsengel	20	1.79 m (5 ft 10 1/2 in)	Ulaanbaatar	Episode 17	1

== Episode summaries ==
Preliminary selections were made prior to the televised episodes to provide the initial 22 contestants.

=== Episode 1 ===
Original Airdate: January 15, 2017

22 contestants were judged based on a 1960s style photoshoot at a mall. After that, the models walk in a runway stage. At the judging panel, the host welcomed a judge from Britain's Next Top Model. After the runway, Anu Otgonbayar cried because her shoe heels came loose and in this situation she lost her confidence. However, she was one of those selected for the next round. The host chose the final 14 contestants and in a surprise twist, two contestants (Oyuunbileg & Jagzmaa) were added, increasing the number from 14 to 16.

- Wildcard contestants: Oyuunbileg & Jagzmaa

=== Episode 2 ===
Original Airdate: January 19, 2017

The 16 contestants had a photo shoot in which they were dressed as Japanese geishas, and the photos were used to select for the next round. The photograph of Tserendolgor received the highest score. Photographs of Büjinlkham, Ikhertsetseg, and Tümenjargal received the lowest scores. As a result, Ikhertsetseg and then Tümenjargal were eliminated.

- Challenge winner: Ankhbayar Munkh-Erdene
- First call-out: Tserendolgor Battsengel
- Bottom three: D. Büjinlkham, Ikhertsetseg Ganbold & B. Tümenjargal
- Eliminated: Ikhertsetseg Ganbold & B. Tümenjargal
- Special judge: Yavuutsagaan Byambajav

Scores
Nº	Model	Nora	Orgil	Nansal- maa	Ÿavuu- tsagaan	Chal.	Total
1	Tserendolgor	10	9	9	10	8.0	46.0
2	Baljidmaa	9	9	9	9	7.0	43.0
3	Bat-Oyuun	7	8	8	7	8.0	38.0
4	Nomin-Erdene	6	6	6	6	9.0	33.0
5	Binderiyaa	4	7	7	6	9.0	33.0
6	Mandkhai	6	6	7	7	7.0	33.0
7	Anu-Üjin	6	5	6	6	7.0	31.0
8	Ankhbayar	5	4	7	6	8.0	30.0
9	Dashbaljid	5	5	7	4	8.0	29.0
10	Jagzmaa	7	5	5	6	6.0	29.0
11	Oyuunbileg	5	6	5	5	7.0	28.0
12	Ijiltsetseg	5	5	5	5	8.0	28.0
13	Sarangerel	4	5	6	5	8.0	28.0
14	Büjinlkham	5	5	5	5	7.0	27.0
15	Tümenjargal	4	4	4	4	6.0	22.0
16	Ikhertsetseg	3	4	3	4	7.0	21.0

- Featured photographer: Amgalan Otgonbayar

=== Episode 3 ===
Original Airdate: January 22, 2017

The girls have their makeovers. Later, the 14 contestants have a photoshoot for Hada Labo skin care campaign. Binderiyaa fainted at the judging panel when Bat-Oyuun was criticized of her photoshoot. Büjinlkham and Jagzmaa landed in bottom two. And it was Bujinlkham was eliminated and placed 14th. After the elimination, Ankhbayar was given a birthday surprise where she is so happy about the celebration. She was also greeted by the judges a birthday song before her photo was criticized.

- Challenge winner: B. Bat-Oyuun
- First call-out: Nomin-Erdene Tuwshinjargal
- Bottom two: D. Büjinlkham & Jagzmaa Bayarjargal
- Eliminated: D. Büjinlkham
- Special judges: Ulambayar Davaa (singer from Kiwi)

Scores
Nº	Model	Nora	Orgil	Nansal- maa	Uka	Chal.	Total
1	Nomin-Erdene	9	10	10	9	9.0	47.0
2	Ijiltsetseg	8	10	9	9	9.0	45.0
3	Bat-Oyuun	8	8	8	8	10.0	42.0
4	Baljidmaa	9	8	8	8	8.0	41.0
5	Tserendolgor	9	7	7	8	9.0	40.0
6	Oyuunbileg	8	8	8	8	8.0	40.0
7	Sarangerel	8	9	8	8	7.0	40.0
8	Ankhbayar	7	8	8	8	8.0	39.0
9	Mandkhai	7	8	7	8	9.0	39.0
10	Binderiyaa	7	6	8	7	7.0	35.0
11	Dashbaljid	7	7	6	6	8.0	34.0
12	Anu-Üjin	6	8	5	8	7.0	34.0
13	Jagzmaa	6	6	6	6	8.0	32.0
14	Bujinlkham	6	6	6	6	7.0	31.0

- Featured photographer: Amgalan Otgonbayar

=== Episode 4 ===
Original Airdate: January 26, 2017

At the beginning of the episode flashbacked the fainting moment of Binderiyaa. At the photoshoot, the contestants had a photoshoot of a dairy product wearing Deel (a Mongolian traditional wear). At the panel, Binderiyaa, Dashbaljid, Jagzmaa and Mandkhai landed in bottom-four revealing Mandkhai first to be safe from going home. Afterwards, It was also revealed that Jagzmaa was safe from elimination leaving Dashbaljid and Binderiyaa eliminated.

- Challenge winner: Baljidmaa Yundenbat
- First call-out: Baljidmaa Yundenbat
- Bottom three: M. Binderiyaa, Dashbaljid Monhzul, Jagzmaa Bayarjargal
- Eliminated: M. Binderiyaa & Dashbaljid Monhzul
- Special judges: Sodgerel Ulziikhutag

Scores
Nº	Model	Nora	Orgil	Nansal- maa	Sod- gerel	Chal.	Total
1	Baljidmaa	10	9	9	10	10.0	48.0
2	Tserendolgor	10	10	10	9	7.0	46.0
3	Bat-Oyuun	9	9	10	10	6.0	44.0
4	Anu-Üjin	9	10	9	9	6.0	43.0
5	Ijiltsetseg	9	8	9	8	7.0	41.0
6	Sarangerel	8	8	8	8	8.0	40.0
7	Ankhbayar	8	9	9	8	7.0	39.0
8	Nomin-Erdene	8	8	8	8	6.0	38.0
9	Oyuunbileg	8	8	8	8	6.0	38.0
10	Mandkhai	8	8	8	8	6.0	38.0
11	Jagzmaa	7	7	7	7	9.0	37.0
12	Dashbaljid	5	4	4	5	8.0	26.0
13	Binderiyaa	4	4	4	4	5.0	21.0

- Featured photographer: Amgalan Otgonbayar

=== Episode 5 ===
Original Airdate: January 29, 2017

- Challenge winner: B. Anu-Üjin
- First call-out: B. Anu-Üjin
- Bottom two: Ankhbayar Munkh-Erdene & Ijiltsetseg Ganbold
- Originally eliminated: Ijiltsetseg Ganbold
- Special judges: Ankhbayar O

Scores
Nº	Model	Nora	Orgil	Nansal- maa	Ankh- bayar	Chal.	Total
1	Anu-Üjin	9	10	9	10	10.0	48.0
2	Mandkhai	9	8	9	9	8.0	43.0
3	Nomin-Erdene	8	9	8	9	6.0	40.0
4	Tserendolgor	8	7	8	7	9.0	39.0
5	Jagzmaa	8	9	8	8	6.0	39.0
6	Baljidmaa	7	8	7	8	7.0	37.0
7	Bat-Oyuun	7	7	7	7	7.0	35.0
8	Oyuunbileg	6	7	6	6	8.0	33.0
9	Sarangerel	6	6	6	6	7.0	31.0
10	Ankhbayar	6	6	6	5	5.0	28.0
11	Ijiltsetseg	5	5	5	5	7.0	27.0

- Featured photographer: Amgalan Otgonbayar

=== Episode 6 ===
Original Airdate: February 4, 2017

- Special judges: Galbadral Nergui

Scores
Nº	Model	Nora	Orgil	Nansal- maa	Gal- badral	Chal.	Total
1	Tserendolgor	8	10	10	9	9.0	46.0
2	Nomin-Erdene	9	9	9	9	9.0	45.0
3	Bat-Oyuun	10	9	8	10	7.0	44.0
4	Baljidmaa	9	9	9	9	8.0	44.0
5	Ijiltsetseg	9	9	9	9	7.0	43.0
6	Anu-Üjin	8	8	7	10	9.0	42.0
7	Sarangerel	9	7	9	9	6.0	40.0
8	Ankhbayar	7	7	5	7	10.0	36.0
9	Oyuunbileg	6	6	6	6	6.0	30.0
10	Mandkhai	4	5	5	5	8.0	27.0
11	Jagzmaa	5	3	6	4	8.0	26.0

- Featured photographer: Amgalan Otgonbayar

=== Episode 7 ===
Original Airdate: February 5, 2017

- Special judges: Enkhbold Enkhtuya

Scores
Nº	Model	Nora	Orgil	Nansal- maa	Enkh- bold	Chal.	Total
1	Sarangerel	9	8	10	10	7.0	44.0
2	Ankhbayar	7	10	8	9	8.0	42.0
3	Baljidmaa	8	8	8	8	9.0	41.0
4	Mandkhai	8	8	8	8	7.0	39.0
5	Tserendolgor	7	8	7	8	8.0	38.0
6	Nomin-Erdene	6	5	8	7	9.0	35.0
7	Bat-Oyuun	7	7	6	6	7.0	33.0
8	Oyuunbileg	7	8	5	5	7.0	32.0
9	Ijiltsetseg	5	6	4	7	7.0	29.0
10	Anu-Üjin	3	4	3	3	7.0	20.0

- Featured photographer: Amgalan Otgonbayar

=== Episode 8 ===
Original Airdate: February 11, 2017

- Special judges: Tsolmandakh Munkh

Scores
Nº	Model	Nora	Orgil	Nansal- maa	Tsol- mandakh	Total
1	Ijiltsetseg	8	8	10	10	36.0
2	Baljidmaa	7	10	9	8	34.0
3	Ankhbayar	10	8	8	8	34.0
4	Tserendolgor	8	8	8	8	32.0
5	Nomin-Erdene	7	8	8	7	30.0
6	Sarangerel	5	6	6	8	25.0
7	Bat-Oyuun	6	7	6	6	25.0
8	Oyuunbileg	6	6	6	6	24.0
9	Mandkhai	5	7	5	5	22.0

- Featured photographer: Amgalan Otgonbayar

=== Episode 9 ===
Original Airdate: February 12, 2017

- Special judges: Badamgerel Khurelbaatar

Scores
Nº	Model	Nora	Orgil	Nansal- maa	Badam- gerel	Chal.	Total
1	Nomin-Erdene	10	9	9	9	9.0	46.0
2	Ankhbayar	7	10	8	8	6.0	39.0
3	Tserendolgor	7	7	7	7	9.0	37.0
4	Oyuunbileg	6	6	6	6	10.0	34.0
5	Ijiltsetseg	7	5	6	6	7.0	31.0
6	Bat-Oyuun	5	7	5	5	7.0	29.0
7	Baljidmaa	5	3	6	4	8.0	26.0
8	Sarangerel	5	4	4	5	7.0	25.0

- Featured photographer: Amgalan Otgonbayar

=== Episode 10 ===
Original Airdate: February 18, 2017

- Special judges: Nyamkhand & Misheel Choigaalaa

Scores
Nº	Model	Nora	Orgil	Nansal- maa	Nyam- khand	Mi- sheel	Chal.	Total
1	Baljidmaa	9	9	9	10	9	9.0	55.0
2	Tserendolgor	10	8	9	9	9	8.0	53.0
3	Nomin-Erdene	7	8	8	7	10	10.0	50.0
4	Bat-Oyuun	8	8	7	9	7	8.0	47.0
5	Ijiltsetseg	7	8	7	7	7	9.0	45.0
6	Oyuunbileg	6	6	8	8	8	8.0	44.0
7	Ankhbayar	7	7	7	7	7	8.0	43.0

- Featured photographer: Amgalan Otgonbayar

=== Episode 11 ===
Original Airdate: February 19, 2017

- Special judges: Purevsuren Dorj

Scores
Nº	Model	Nora	Orgil	Nansal- maa	Purev- suren	Chal.	Total
1	Ankhbayar Baljidmaa	10	9	10	9	5.0	43.0
1	Ankhbayar Baljidmaa	7	10	9	10	7.0	43.0
3	Nomin-Erdene	9	9	9	9	6.0	42.0
4	Oyuunbileg	5	6	9	8	10.0	38.0
5	Ijiltsetseg	6	4	10	10	5.0	35.0
6	Tserendolgor	7	9	3	7	8.0	34.0
7	Bat-Oyuun	3	8	5	7	5.0	28.0

- Featured photographer: Amgalan Otgonbayar

=== Episode 12 ===
Original Airdate: February 25, 2017

- Special judges: Nomungerel B

Scores
Nº	Model	Nora	Orgil	Nansal- maa	Nomun- gerel	Chal.	Total
1	Nomin-Erdene	10	10	9	10	8.0	47.0
2	Baljidmaa	8	9	8	8	9.0	42.0
3	Ankhbayar	9	8	10	8	5.0	40.0
4	Tserendolgor	5	8	9	6	10.0	38.0
5	Oyuunbileg	8	6	5	9	8.0	36.0
6	Ijiltsetseg	7	9	6	7	5.0	34.0

- Featured photographer: Amgalan Otgonbayar

=== Episode 13 ===
Original Airdate: February 26, 2017

The final 5 girls were have another makeovers.

- Special judges: Fadli Rahman

Scores
Nº	Model	Nora	Orgil	Nansal- maa	Fadli	Chal.	Total
1	Nomin-Erdene	8	10	9	10	7.7	44.7
2	Baljidmaa	7	9	8	8	8.9	40.9
3	Tserendolgor	8	8	7	7	8.3	38.3
4	Oyuunbileg	8	7	6	5	9.0	35.0
5	Ankhbayar	6	5	5	5	7.7	28.7

- Featured photographer: Fadli Rahman

=== Episode 14 ===
Original Airdate: March 4, 2017

- Special judges: Bolormaa D

Scores
Nº	Model	Nora	Orgil	Nansal- maa	Fadli	Chal.	Total
1	Tserendolgor	8	9	9	9	10.0	45.0
2	Baljidmaa	9	9	9	9	8.0	44.0
3	Nomin-Erdene	7	8	7	8	9.0	39.0
4	Oyuunbileg	6	7	6	6	9.0	34.0

- Featured photographer: Fadli Rahman

=== Episode 15 ===
Original Airdate: March 5, 2017

Nora invited all the girls back for a dinner whilst catching up on everything that happened.

=== Episode 16 ===
Original Airdate: March 11, 2017

This episode recapped the entire competition from the first episode up to the selection of the final three contestants.

=== Episode 17 ===
Original Airdate: March 12, 2017

Scores
Nº	Model	Nora	Orgil	Nansalmaa	Media	Total
1	Tserendolgor	20	20	20	7.0	67.0
2	Baljidmaa	12	12	14	10.0	48.0
3	Nomin-Erdene	12	12	10	5.0	39.0

== Call-out order ==
Order	Episodes														
Order	1	2 (Note: Episode 2 featured a double elimination with three contestants being in danger of elimination.)	3	4 (Note: Episode 4 featured a double elimination with three contestants being in danger of elimination.)	5 (Note: In episode 5, Ijiltsetseg was originally eliminated but allowed to remain in the competition.)	6	7	8	9	10 (Note: In episode 10, Ankhbayar and Oyuunbileg landed in the bottom two, but neither of them was eliminated.)	11	12	13	14	17 (Note: Episodes 15 and 16 were the recap episodes.)
1	Tserendolgor	Tserendolgor	Nomin-Erdene	Baljidmaa	Anu-Üjin	Tserendolgor	Sarangerel	Ijiltsetseg	Nomin-Erdene	Baljidmaa	Ankhbayar; Baljidmaa	Nomin-Erdene	Nomin-Erdene	Tserendolgor	Tserendolgor
2	Sarangerel	Baljidmaa	Ijiltsetseg	Tserendolgor	Mandkhai	Nomin-Erdene	Ankhbayar	Baljidmaa	Ankhbayar	Nomin-Erdene; Tserendolgor	Ankhbayar; Baljidmaa	Baljidmaa	Baljidmaa	Baljidmaa	Baljidmaa
3	Dashbaljid	Bat-Oyuun	Bat-Oyuun	Bat-Oyuun	Nomin-Erdene	Bat-Oyuun	Baljidmaa	Ankhbayar	Tserendolgor	Nomin-Erdene; Tserendolgor	Nomin-Erdene	Ankhbayar	Tserendolgor	Nomin-Erdene	Nomin-Erdene
4	Büjinlkham	Nomin-Erdene	Baljidmaa	Anu-Üjin	Tserendolgor	Baljidmaa	Mandkhai	Tserendolgor	Oyuunbileg	Bat-Oyuun	Oyuunbileg	Tserendolgor	Oyuunbileg	Oyuunbileg	
5	Baljidmaa	Binderiyaa	Tserendolgor	Ijiltsetseg	Jagzmaa	Ijiltsetseg	Tserendolgor	Nomin-Erdene	Ijiltsetseg	Ijiltsetseg	Ijiltsetseg	Oyuunbileg	Ankhbayar		
6	Anu-Üjin	Mandkhai	Sarangerel	Sarangerel	Baljidmaa	Anu-Üjin	Nomin-Erdene	Sarangerel	Bat-Oyuun	Ankhbayar; Oyuunbileg	Tserendolgor	Ijiltsetseg			
7	Ijiltsetseg	Anu-Üjin	Oyuunbileg	Ankhbayar	Bat-Oyuun	Sarangerel	Bat-Oyuun	Bat-Oyuun	Baljidmaa	Ankhbayar; Oyuunbileg	Bat-Oyuun				
8	Ikhertsetseg	Ankhbayar	Binderiyaa	Nomin-Erdene	Oyuunbileg	Ankhbayar	Oyuunbileg	Oyuunbileg	Sarangerel						
9	Mandkhai	Dashbaljid	Ankhbayar	Oyuunbileg	Sarangerel	Oyuunbileg	Ijiltsetseg	Mandkhai							
10	Binderiyaa	Jagzmaa	Mandkhai	Mandkhai	Ankhbayar	Mandkhai	Anu-Üjin								
11	Nomin-Erdene	Oyuunbileg	Dashbaljid	Jagzmaa	Ijiltsetseg	Jagzmaa									
12	Bat-Oyuun	Ijiltsetseg	Anu-Üjin	Dashbaljid											
13	Ankhbayar	Sarangerel	Jagzmaa	Binderiyaa											
14	Tümenjargal	Büjinlkham	Büjinlkham												
15	Oyuunbileg	Tümenjargal													
16	Jagzmaa	Ikhertsetseg													

The contestant was eliminated
The contestant was originally eliminated from the competition but was saved
The contestant was part of a non-elimination bottom two.
The contestant won the competition

=== Scoring chart ===
Place	Model	Episodes														Total score	Average
Place	Model	2	3	4	5	6	7	8	9	10	11	12	13	14	17	Total score	Average
1	Tserendolgor	46.0	40.0	46.0	39.0	46.0	38.0	32.0	37.0	53.0	34.0	38.0	38.3	45.0	67.0	579.3	41.37
2	Baljidmaa	43.0	41.0	48.0	37.0	44.0	41.0	34.0	26.0	55.0	43.0	42.0	40.9	44.0	48.0	573.6	40.97
3	Nomin-Erdene	35.0	47.0	38.0	40.0	45.0	35.0	30.0	45.0	50.0	42.0	47.0	44.7	39.0	39.0	565.4	40.38
4	Oyuunbileg	28.0	40.0	38.0	33.0	32.0	32.0	24.0	34.0	44.0	38.0	36.0	35.0	34.0		448.0	34.46
5	Ankhbayar	30.0	39.0	39.0	28.0	36.0	42.0	34.0	39.0	43.0	43.0	40.0	28.7			440.7	36.73
6	Ijiltsetseg	28.0	44.0	41.0	27.0	43.0	29.0	36.0	32.0	47.0	35.0	34.0				396.0	36.00
7	Bat-Oyuun	38.0	42.0	44.0	35.0	44.0	33.0	25.0	29.0	47.0	28.0					365.0	36.50
8	Sarangerel	28.0	40.0	40.0	31.0	40.0	44.0	25.0	25.0							273.0	34.13
9	Mandkhai	33.0	39.0	38.0	44.0	27.0	39.0	22.0								242.0	34.57
10	Anu-Üjin	31.0	34.0	43.0	48.0	42.0	20.0									218.0	36.33
11	Jagzmaa	29.0	32.0	37.0	39.0	26.0										163.0	32.60
12	Dashbaljid	29.0	36.0	26.0												91.0	30.33
13	Binderiyaa	34.0	36.0	21.0												91.0	30.33
14	Büjinlkham	27.0	31.0													58.0	29.00
15	Tümenjargal	22.0														22.0	22.00
16	Ikhertsetseg	21.0														21.0	21.00

Indicates the contestant won the competition.
Indicates the contestant had the highest score that week.
Indicates the contestant was eliminated that week.
Indicates the contestant was in the bottom two that week.
Indicates the contestant was originally eliminated that week, but was saved.

Bottom Two/Three

Episodes	Contestants			Eliminated
2	Büjinlkham	Ikhertsetseg	Tümenjargal	Ikhertsetseg
2	Büjinlkham	Ikhertsetseg	Tümenjargal	Tümenjargal
3	Büjinlkham	&	Jagzmaa	Büjinlkham
4	Binderiyaa	Dashbaljid	Jagzmaa	Binderiyaa
4	Binderiyaa	Dashbaljid	Jagzmaa	Dashbaljid
5	Ankhbayar	&	Ijiltsetseg	None
6	Jagzmaa	&	Mandkhai	Jagzmaa
7	Anu-Üjin	&	Ijiltsetseg	Anu-Üjin
8	Mandkhai	&	Oyuunbileg	Mandkhai
9	Baljidmaa	&	Sarangerel	Sarangerel
10	Ankhbayar	&	Oyuunbileg	None
11	Bat-Oyuun	&	Tserendolgor	Bat-Oyuun
12	Ijiltsetseg	&	Oyuunbileg	Ijiltsetseg
13	Ankhbayar	&	Oyuunbileg	Ankhbayar
14	Nomin-Erdene	&	Oyuunbileg	Oyuunbileg
17	Baljidmaa	Nomin-Erdene	Tserendolgor	Nomin-Erdene
17	Baljidmaa	Nomin-Erdene	Tserendolgor	Baljidmaa

The contestant was eliminated after their first time in the bottom two
The contestant was eliminated after their second time in the bottom two
The contestant was eliminated after their second time in the bottom two
The contestant was eliminated after their fifth time in the bottom two
The contestant was eliminated and placed as third place
The contestant was eliminated and placed as the runner-up

=== Photo shoot guide ===
- Episode 2 photo shoot: Two Sided Of High Fashionable Create With The Shadow
- Episode 3 photo shoot: Science Master
- Episode 4 photo and commercial: Wet And Wild Body Athletic On The Wall
- Episode 5 photo shoot and commercial: Head To Head Personality Commercial On a Team
- Episode 6 photo shoot: Sweet And Dreamy In Candyland With Coated Of Candy's
- Episode 7 photo shoot: House Fighting
- Episode 8 photo shoot: Create The Arts In Avant Garde Style And Background
- Episode 9 photo shoot: The Supermodel's Aura
- Episode 10 photo shoot And Commercial: Glam And Glamour In Iguazu WaterFalls, Canon Camera Television Commercial
- Episode 11 photo shoot: Haute Couture Catalogue Compcard
- Episode 12 photo shoot: Local Amazonians With Jaguar And Traditional Clothes
- Episode 13 photo shoot: Zero Waste At Garbage In Photo And Video
- Episode 14 photo shoot And Commercial: Exotic Baby's, Loreal Cover And Commercial, Six Continental And Four Seasons Runaway
- Episode 15 photo shoot And Acting Video : Inca's Kingdom Photoshoot And War Acting Commercial,1900's Latin Photo Group
- Episode 16 photo shoot: Four Magazine Cover
