= Mongolia's Next Top Model season 2 =

Mongolia's Next Top Model
- Season 2
- Season 2's cast
- No. of episodes: 13

Release
- Original network: Edutainment TV
- Original release: October 6, 2018 – January 20, 2019

Season chronology
- ← Previous; Season 1 Next → Season 3

The second season of Mongolia's Next Top Model premiered on 6 October 2018 on Edutainment TV. This is the second season of the series to be hosted model Nora Dagva.

The prizes for this cycle were a 2-year modelling contract with Brave Model Management in Milan and a cash prize of ₮20.000.000 (about US$7,600).

Eighteen-year-old Anujin Bayan-Erdene from Ulaanbaatar was crowned as the winner of the competition during a private ceremony on January 17, 2019. Chamia Chimedtseren also received a shared, posthumous first placement with Baynerdene in tribute to her memory, as she had died some months before.

== Contestants ==
(Ages stated are at start of contest)

Contestant	Age	Height	Hometown	Finish	Place
Udval Yo.	21	1.71 m (5 ft 7 1/2 in)	Xilinhot	Episode 2	16 (quit)
Tergel Munkhbayar	20	1.74 m (5 ft 8 1/2 in)	Ulaanbaatar	Episode 2	15
Anulan Uelun	17	1.78 m (5 ft 10 in)	Ulaanbaatar	Episode 3	14
Agru T.	22	1.76 m (5 ft 9 1/2 in)	Hohhot	Episode 4	13 (quit)
Batkhand S.	20	1.83 m (6 ft 0 in)	Ulaanbaatar	Episode 5	12
Badmaarag Narmandakh	21	1.73 m (5 ft 8 in)	Ulaanbaatar	Episode 6	11
Tsetsegmaa 'Jyerri' Baatarchuluun	25	1.70 m (5 ft 7 in)	Ulaanbaatar	Episode 7	10
Oyuunsuvd 'Suvdaa' A.	23	1.80 m (5 ft 11 in)	Xilinhot	Episode 8	9
Tsetsegsaikhan 'Tomi' Baatarchuluun	25	1.70 m (5 ft 7 in)	Ulaanbaatar	Episode 9	8
Beligma Yansanova	19	1.74 m (5 ft 8 1/2 in)	Ulan-Ude	Episode 10	7
Goyokhon Zhao	17	1.88 m (6 ft 2 in)	Hohhot	Episode 11	6
Oontungalag 'Odnoo' Enkhtaivan	18	1.82 m (5 ft 11 1/2 in)	Ulaanbaatar	Episode 13	5-3
Misheel Nasanjargal	18	1.81 m (5 ft 11 1/2 in)	Ulaanbaatar	Episode 13	5-3
Alina Dansaranova	21	1.80 m (5 ft 11 in)	Ulan-Ude	Episode 13	5-3
Chamia Chimedtseren † (Note: Chamia passed away after filming had concluded.)	22	1.79 m (5 ft 10 1/2 in)	Ulaanbaatar	Episode 13	1
Anujin Bayanerdene	18	1.80 m (5 ft 11 in)	Ulaanbaatar	Episode 13	1

== Episode summaries ==
=== Episode 1 ===
Original airdate: October 6, 2018

This was the casting episode. The 22 semifinalists had a runway show and a photoshoot at an airport. At panel they were narrowed down to the top 16. After the casting, they move into their model villa, where they will live throughout the competition.

=== Episode 2 ===
Original Airdate: October 13, 2018

The girls have their first photoshoot challenge for Innov Style clothing line & magazine, Tomi won the challenge and her photo will be in the cover of the magazine. Later, they have a beauty shoot above the water for Biomon skin care campaign, Udval fainted at the photoshoot and was rushed to the hospital, and the result that she decide to quitted during the judging. Agru and Tergel landed in bottom two. And it was Tergel was the first girl to be eliminated.

- Challenge winner: Tomi Baatarchuluun
- Quit: Udval Yondonpeljee
- First call-out: Tomi Baatarchuluun
- Bottom two: Agru T. & Tergel Munkhbayar
- Eliminated: Tergel Munkhbayar

=== Episode 3 ===
Original airdate: October 20, 2018

The girls have their makeovers. Later, the 14 contestants have a boxing photoshoot in pair. Anulan and Sainbuyan landed in bottom two. And it was Anulan was eliminated.

- Challenge winner: Chamia Chimedtseren
- First call-out: Alina Dansaranova
- Bottom two: Anulan Uelun & Batkhand Sainbuyan
- Eliminated: Anulan Uelun

=== Episode 4 ===
Original airdate: November 18, 2018 (Note: The season temporarily entered a four-week hiatus while an investigation surrounding the circumstances of Chamia's death took place. Though the season later resumed, it was postponed again after the eleventh episode.)

The girls are having a bikini wax before packed their bags for a trip to Ordos City. There, they went to the Erdeniin Tobchi movietown and have a photoshoot challenge at the temple, Misheel won the challenge and received a pair of sneakers. At night, the girls have a photoshoot where they become sexy sailor on the yacht. In the next morning, Nora just only announced the top-3 of this week, after that she call out Agru, and she decide to quit. Her quit decision has made Chamia, Goyokhon & Suvdaa upset and Nora shouted at them.

- Challenge winner: Misheel Nasanjargal
- First call-out: Chamia Chimedtseren
- Quit: Agru T.

=== Episode 5 ===
Original airdate: November 25, 2018

The remaining 12 girls head to the Desert Lotus Resort at Xiangshawan. There, they have a catwalk challenge in a bubble runway show over a pool, Misheel won the challenge and win a shopping spree. Later, they have a photoshoot with camel at the desert. Badmaarag, Sainbuyan and Misheel landed in bottom three. And it was Sainbuyan was eliminated.

- Challenge winner: Misheel Nasanjargal
- First call-out: Anujin Baynerdene
- Bottom three: Badmaarag Narmandakh, Batkhand Sainbuyan & Misheel Nasanjargal
- Eliminated: Batkhand Sainbuyan

=== Episode 6 ===
Original airdate: December 2, 2018

- Challenge winner: Misheel Nasanjargal
- First call-out: Beligma Yansanova
- Bottom two: Badmaarag Narmandakh & Misheel Nasanjargal
- Eliminated: Badmaarag Narmandakh

=== Episode 7 ===
Original airdate: December 9, 2018

- Challenge winner: Odnoo Enkhtaiwan
- First call-out: Alina Dansaranova
- Bottom two: Anujin Baynerdene & Jyerri Baatarchuluun
- Eliminated: Jyerri Baatarchuluun

=== Episode 8 ===
Original airdate: December 16, 2018

9 remaining girls heading to Arxan. They have a photoshot with wolf for Isispharma. Goyokhon and Suvdaa landed in bottom two. And it was Suvdaa was eliminated, making Goyokhon the last Chinese remaining. After the elimination, the girl went back to Ulaanbaatar.

- Challenge winner: Alina Dansaranova
- First call-out: Odnoo Enkhtaiwan
- Bottom two: Goyokhon Zinkhbagal & Suvdaa Ariuntuyaa
- Eliminated: Suvdaa Ariuntuyaa

=== Episode 9 ===
Original airdate: December 23, 2018

- Challenge winner: Chamia Chimedtseren
- First call-out: Alina Dansaranova
- Bottom two: Odnoo Enkhtaiwan & Tomi Baatarchuluun
- Eliminated: Tomi Baatarchuluun

=== Episode 10 ===
Original airdate: December 30, 2018

The girls have their photoshoot challenge as a pin-up girl with food, Alina won the challenge and won a shopping spree from Xti. Later, they met last year's winner Tserendolgor Battsenger, who tells about her next photoshoot as a fashion ice queen. Alina and Beligma landed in bottom three. And it was Beligma was eliminated, making Alina the last Russian remaining.

- Challenge winner: Odnoo Enkhtaiwan
- First call-out: Anujin Baynerdene
- Bottom two: Alina Dansaranova & Beligma Yansanova
- Eliminated: Beligma Yansanova

=== Episode 11 ===
Original airdate: January 6, 2019

The girls have their commercial challenge with some products from Ma Maison Home Decor Mongolia; Chamia won the challenge and won a shopping spree from them. They have a photoshoot and motion editorial for Baigal House in lingerie and yak at steppe. After the photoshoot, the girls have a visit for their family at the model's villa. Anujin and Goyokhon landed in bottom two. And it was Goyokhon was eliminated.

- Challenge winner: Chamia Chimedtseren
- First call-out: Odnoo Enkhtaiwan
- Bottom two: Anujin Baynerdene & Goyokhon Zinkhbagal
- Eliminated: Goyokhon Zinkhbagal

=== Episode 12 ===
Original airdate: January 13, 2019

Interviewed episode with the Mongolian contestant about this season.

=== Episode 13 ===
Original airdate: January 20, 2019

- Runners-up: Alina Dansaranova, Misheel Nasanjargal, & Odnoo Enkhtaiwan
- Winners: Anujin Baynerdene & Chamia Chimedtseren

== Results ==
Order	Episodes											
Order	1 (Note: In episode 1, the call-out did not reflect the models' performance.)	2 (Note: In episode 2, after fainting at the photo shoot, Udval decided to quit at panel after consulting the doctor. There was still an elimination regardless.)	3	4 (Note: In episode 4, after revealing the week's top 3, Nora revealed that Agru had quit the competition. The remaining contestants were collectively advanced to the next round.)	5	6	7	8	9	10	11	13 (Note: In episode 13, Chamia received a posthumous first placement alongside Anujin, after having passed away during the filming break before the finale.)
1	Odnoo	Tomi	Alina	Chamia	Anujin	Beligma	Alina	Odnoo	Alina	Anujin	Odnoo	Anujin; Chamia
2	Agru	Odnoo	Chamia	Beligma	Tomi	Odnoo	Tomi	Chamia	Chamia	Odnoo	Misheel	Anujin; Chamia
3	Goyokhon	Anujin	Beligma	Tomi	Suvdaa	Tomi	Goyokhon	Beligma	Misheel	Misheel	Chamia	Alina; Misheel; Odnoo
4	Tomi	Alina	Jyerri	Agru	Odnoo	Alina	Misheel	Alina	Anujin	Chamia	Alina	Alina; Misheel; Odnoo
5	Misheel	Badmaarag	Misheel	Alina; Anujin; Badmaarag; Batkhand; Goyokhon; Jyerri; Misheel; Odnoo; Suvdaa	Chamia	Chamia	Chamia	Anujin	Beligma	Goyokhon	Anujin	Alina; Misheel; Odnoo
6	Batkhand	Goyokhon	Suvdaa	Alina; Anujin; Badmaarag; Batkhand; Goyokhon; Jyerri; Misheel; Odnoo; Suvdaa	Goyokhon	Jyerri	Odnoo	Tomi	Goyokhon	Alina	Goyokhon	
7	Badmaarag	Chamia	Anujin	Alina; Anujin; Badmaarag; Batkhand; Goyokhon; Jyerri; Misheel; Odnoo; Suvdaa	Beligma	Anujin	Suvdaa	Misheel	Odnoo	Beligma		
8	Beligma	Beligma	Agru	Alina; Anujin; Badmaarag; Batkhand; Goyokhon; Jyerri; Misheel; Odnoo; Suvdaa	Jyerri	Suvdaa	Beligma	Goyokhon	Tomi			
9	Anujin	Batkhand	Goyokhon	Alina; Anujin; Badmaarag; Batkhand; Goyokhon; Jyerri; Misheel; Odnoo; Suvdaa	Alina	Goyokhon	Anujin	Suvdaa				
10	Tergel	Jyerri	Tomi	Alina; Anujin; Badmaarag; Batkhand; Goyokhon; Jyerri; Misheel; Odnoo; Suvdaa	Badmaarag	Misheel	Jyerri					
11	Alina	Anulan	Badmaarag	Alina; Anujin; Badmaarag; Batkhand; Goyokhon; Jyerri; Misheel; Odnoo; Suvdaa	Misheel	Badmaarag						
12	Udval	Suvdaa	Odnoo	Alina; Anujin; Badmaarag; Batkhand; Goyokhon; Jyerri; Misheel; Odnoo; Suvdaa	Batkhand							
13	Suvdaa	Misheel	Batkhand	Alina; Anujin; Badmaarag; Batkhand; Goyokhon; Jyerri; Misheel; Odnoo; Suvdaa								
14	Chamia	Agru	Anulan									
15	Jyerri	Tergel										
16	Anulan	Udval										

The contestant quit the competition.
The contestant was eliminated.
The contestant won the competition.

=== Photo shoots ===
- Episode 1 photo shoot: Posing at an airport (casting)
- Episode 2 photo shoot: Beauty shot in a bathtub for Biomon Skincare
- Episode 3 photo shoot: Posing in pairs in a boxing ring
- Episode 4 photo shoot: Sexy sailors on a yacht
- Episode 5 photo shoot: Posing with a camel in the desert
- Episode 6 photo shoot: Quirky anti-gravity
- Episode 7 photo shoot: Swimsuits in rock formations
- Episode 8 photo shoot: Posing with a wolf for Isispharma
- Episode 9 photo shoot: Posing as robot Barbies
- Episode 10 photo shoot: Ice queens
- Episode 11 photo shoot: Posing with a yak for Baigal House
- Episode 13 photo shoot: Posing with a male model for Goyo

== Controversy ==
Following the airing of the show's third episode, 22 year-old contestant Chamia Chimedtseren from Ulaanbaatar was found dead after allegedly suffering a fall from a height of several stories. An investigation surrounding the nature of her death was launched immediately afterward, which led to the postponing of the season after that episode.

Several weeks afterward, the show resumed airing the episodes under a regular schedule. There was a public outcry over the airing of the season, as it was unknown how far the late contestant had progressed into the competition due to the pre-recorded nature of the episodes. There was further confusion over how the season would proceed in the event that Chimedtseren had advanced into the live finale, which had yet to take place.

A private crowning ceremony was held with the remaining four contestants on January 17, 2019. 18 year-old Anujin Baynerdene was chosen as the winner of the competition. A memorial service was held for Chimedtseren, whose family also received a posthumous award and cash prize on her behalf for her efforts in the competition. The final episode aired on January 20, 2019.
