= Marina Devyatova =

Russian singer (born 1983)

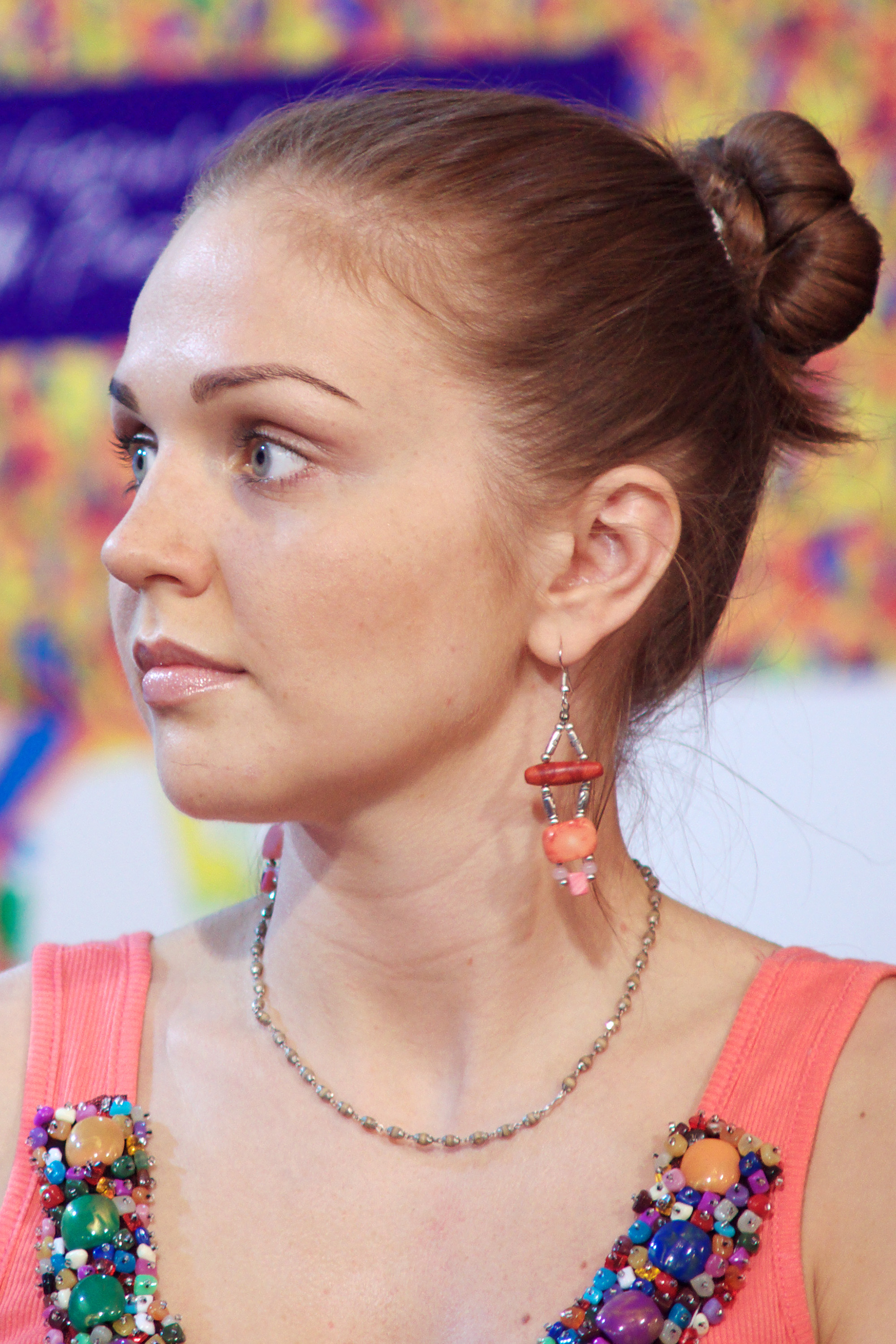
- Marina Devyatova in Belarus

Background information
- Born: Marina Vladimirovna Devyatova; 13 December 1983 (age 42); Moscow, Soviet Union.
- Origin: Russia
- Genres: Pop; Russian traditional music
- Occupation: Singer
- Website: marinadevyatova.ru

Marina Vladimirovna Devyatova (Russian: Мари́на Влади́мировна Девя́това, born 13 December 1983) is a Russian singer and interpreter of Russian traditional music. She was a finalist of the third edition of Narodni Artist (People's Artist), the Russian equivalent of American Idol.

== Biography ==
Marina Devyatova was born on 13 December 1983 in Moscow in the former Soviet Union. She is the daughter of Natalya Lopato, a choreographer, and singer Vladimir Devyatov, who was awarded the distinction People's Artist of Russia. Devyatov discovered his daughter's talent in her early childhood, when she started singing and feeling rhythm at the age of three. Her parents divorced when she was five years old. After the divorce, she was raised mainly by her mother. At the age of 11, she met again with her father, who encouraged her wish to become a professional singer and took her to sing with him at one of his concerts at the Rossiya concert hall.

In 1990, her parents enrolled her in the Shostakovich Children's Music School to study choral conducting. In 1999, she continued her studies at the Schnittke Musical College, specializing in solo folk singing. Two years later, she won the all-Russian Ippolitov-Ivanonv contest for folk music performers held in Voronezh.

In her fourth year in music college, she accepted an invitation to become the lead-singer of the Indrik-Zver musical ensemble, which performed traditional Russian and Slavic music incorporating elements of modern rock and pop. Combining study and work, Devyatova attended the Faculty of solo folk singing of the Gnessin Academy of Music between 2003 and 2008. During her first year in the institution, she made her first appearance at the renowned Slavic Music Festival Slavianski Bazaar, held yearly in Belarus.

Amid persistent criticism that her music lacked format, Devyatova decide to participate in the 2006 edition of the program Narodni Artist/Народный Артист (People's Artist). She went on to reach the final, where despite being praised by the jury after performing the folk song "This could be love" in a duet with the winner of the first edition, Aleksey Goman, the public chose Mongolian-Russian performer Amarkhuu Borkhuu as the winner.

Despite the loss, her presence in the contest made her gradually known and allowed her to start an international tour in Germany, Italy, France, Bulgaria, Latvia, Estonia, USA, South Korea, China, Laos, Vietnam and even Mongolia. In 2007, she was part of Russian delegation in Guatemala at the ceremony of choosing the capital of the 2014 Winter Olympics. The city of Sochi on the Black Sea coast was selected and she performed the patriotic World War II song Katyusha at the event.

In 2008, her first solo concert, dedicated to national traditions and folklore, was sponsored by the Russian Ministry of Culture. The next year, Devyatova was selected by the Ministry of Foreign Affairs and the Russian Orthodox Church to perform at a presentation of Russian folk music in the United Kingdom for Queen Elizabeth II and the royal family. Along her career, Devyatova performed at prominent events attended by high-rank politicians and foreign heads of state, such as Vladimir Putin, Dmitry Medvedev, Kazakhstan's president Nursultan Nazarbayev and Libyan revolutionary Muammar Gaddafi.

In 2009, during the premiere of her show Poydu, Vyydu at the Moscow State Estrada Theater, Devyatova launched her debut album Ne dumala, ne gadala. Her second album Ya schastlivaya ("I'm happy") would come out two years later. According to her, the album title describes the state of mind and energy in her creative art. Her third album V lunnom siyanii followed in 2013. In December of that year, she celebrated her 30th birthday with the solo concert V den' rozhdeniya s lyubovyu at the Rossiya Concert Hall.

In 2015, Devyatova shared the stage with honoured artist of the Russian Federation Varvara, with whom she would compete some months later for the Russian National Music Award in the category Best Folk artist. The award went ultimately to fellow singer Pelageya. In 2019, she celebrated her 20th career anniversary with a concert at the State Kremlin Palace.

== Image and style ==
The Russian song and folklore is what connect us. We can be of different ages, different social classes, but it is our layer, on which the whole Russian nation stands. As long as the Russian and its people live, the Russian folk music will live

— Marina Devyatova

Growing up under musical influence of her father, who sang mainly folk among other genres, she not only learned to appreciate Russian interpreters but also western classic rock groups, such as The Beatles and Deep Purple.

On stage, Devyatova often wears traditional Russian costumes sewn by designers. She often collaborates with ballet Яr-Дэнс (Yar-Dance) and sometimes performs with children's dance squads. Her repertoire includes duets with artists, such as Vladimir Devyatov, Varvara, Nikolay Baskov, Alexander Buinov among others. Besides her career as a folk singer, she participated in musical comedy sketches with humourist Svyatoslav Eschenko. According to Vechernyaya Moskva, Devyatova often gets invited to perform outside the country as an "ambassador" of Russian culture.

== Personal life ==
Although having showed interest for music since an early age, Devyatova stated that she dreamed of working as a saleswoman in her childhood. Her grandfather, who was a military prosecutor, expressed his wish for her to become a jurist. However, she decided to follow her father's steps as a folk singer.

On 28 October 2016, she married Aleksey Pigurenko, a publicity industry executive who she had known since 2008. In 2017, the couple welcomed their daughter Ulyana.

After getting close to Krishnaism in her years in the Shnittke Musical College, Devyatova stopped smoking and drinking alcohol, and started practicing yoga and meditation. When asked about her religious beliefs, however, she demurred, declaring it a deep personal matter. After visiting a slaughterhouse in 2005, she became a vegetarian and stopped wearing fur and leather to avoid inflicting harm and pain on animals.

== Discography ==
- 2009: Не думала, не гадала (I Did Not Think, I Did Not Say)
- 2012: Я счастливая (I am Happy)
- 2013: В лунном сиянии (In the Moonlight)
- 2018: Не будите меня молоду... (Don't wake me up young)
- 2020: Можно, я буду рядом (May I be next to you)
