= The Models (Mongolian TV series) =

Mongolian modeling TV show

- Genre: Reality television
- Created by: Tyra Banks
- Presented by: Urantsetseg Ganbold (3); Nora Dagva (1-2)
- Judges: Urantsetseg Ganbold (3); Odgerel Ereenkhuu (2-); Nora Dagva (1-2); Enkhbold Indigo (2); Orgil Makhaan (1); Nansalmaa Tumur (1)
- Opening theme: Behi - "Revolution" (1)
- No. of episodes: 42

Production
- Running time: 60 mins

Original release
- Network: EduTV
- Release: January 15, 2017 – January 9, 2022

The Models (previously known as Mongolia's Next Top Model) is a Mongolian reality television series, based on Tyra Banks' America's Next Top Model, which features a group of young women who compete for the title of Mongolia's Next Top Model and a chance to begin their career in the modeling industry. The series began to air on EduTV on January 15, 2017. After a two-year hiatus the show came back and has been renamed to "The Models" for season 3 and onwards.

== Format ==
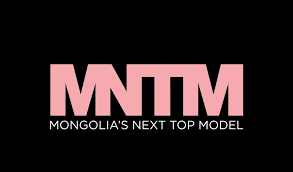
Show logo used from 2018–2019

Each season of Mongolia's Next Top Model has about 16-17 regular episodes, with a special recap episode which airs near the end of each season. Each season generally begins with about 16 contestants. Contestants are judged weekly on their overall appearance, participation in challenges, and their best photos from that week's photo shoot.

Each episode, one contestant is eliminated, though in rare cases a double elimination or non-elimination was given by consensus of the judging panel. Makeovers are given to contestants early in the season (usually after the first elimination) and a trip to an international destination is sometimes scheduled about two-thirds of the way through the season.

=== Differences from America's Next Top Model ===
In contrast the American version, the contestants receive instruction from a mentor who helps coach them in various aspects of the modelling industry and acts as a general assistant during photo shoots and challenges.

== Cycles ==
Cycle	Premiere date	Winner	Runner-up	Other contestants in order of elimination	Number of contestants	International Destinations
1	15 January 2017	Tserendolgor Battsengel	Baljidmaa Ÿundenbat	Ikhertsetseg Ganbold & Tümenjargal Batjargal, Büjinlkham Dorjsuren, Benderïya Monkhoo & Dashbaljid Monhzul, Jagzmaa Bayarjargal, Anu-Üjin Batzorig, Mandkhai Shumiyaa, Sarangerel Tumbish, Bat-Oÿuun Battsetseg, Ijiltsetseg Ganbold, Ankhbayar Munkh-Erdene, Oÿuunbileg Enkh-Amgalan, Nomin-Erdene Tuvshinjargal	16	None
2	6 October 2018	Anujin Bayanerdene & Chamia Chimedtseren	Alina Dansaranova & Misheel Nasanjargal & Odnoo Enkhtaiwan	Udval Yondonkheljee (quit), Tergel Munkhbayar, Anulan Uelun, Agru T. (quit), Batkhand Sainbuyan, Badmaarag Narmandakh, Jyerri Baatarchuluun, Suvdaa Ariuntuyaa, Tomi Baatarchuluun, Beligma Yansanova, Goyokhon Zhao	16	Ordos City; Arxan; Buryatia
3	24 October 2021	Hanna Buyankhishig	Khatnaa Naranbyamba	Undraa Mönkhbaatar, Mendy Amgalanbaatar, Khulanii Gansukh & Anu Temüüjin, Darikona Delgersaikhan, Naraa Ganbataar, Undrakh Tumurchudur, Sondor Ganzul, Dino Beina & Akuna Khatanbaatar, Nuna Tungalagtamir, Zaya Bagahuu & Dieu Erkhembayar, Tsolmon Gantulga	16	None
