= The Models (Mongolian TV series) season 3 =

The Models
- Season 3
- No. of episodes: 12

Release
- Original network: Edutainment TV
- Original release: 24 October 2021 – 9 January 2022

Season chronology
- ← Previous; Season 2

The third season of The Models (previously titled "Mongolia's Next Top Model") premiered on 24 October 2021 on Edutainment TV and streamed on the VOO App. This is the third season of the series that received notable changes including the new host Urantsetseg Ganbold who replaced Nora Dagva.

The prizes for this cycle were: a cash prize of ₮20.000.000 (about US$7,600) and a 6-night trip to Maldives courtesy by Cruise Tour Mongolia.

The winner was the 21-year-old Hanna Buyankhishig from Ulaanbaatar.

== Contestants ==
(Ages stated are at start of contest)

Contestant	Age	Height	Finish	Place
Enkh-Undral 'Undraa' Mönkhbaatar	21	1.71 m (5 ft 7 1/2 in)	Episode 2	16
Mandukhay 'Mendy' Amgalanbaatar	21	1.83 m (6 ft 0 in)	Episode 3	15
Khulan 'Khulanii' Gansukh	25	1.68 m (5 ft 6 in)	Episode 4	14-13
Anujin 'Anu' Timüüjin	21	1.77 m (5 ft 9 1/2 in)	Episode 4	14-13
Oyuundari 'Darikona' Damdinsuren	21	1.73 m (5 ft 8 in)	Episode 5	12
Narantsetseg 'Naraa' Ganbaatar	24	1.75 m (5 ft 9 in)	Episode 6	11
Undrakh Tumurchudur	18	1.76 m (5 ft 9 1/2 in)	Episode 7	10
Suvdansondor 'Sondor' Ganzul	18	1.80 m (5 ft 11 in)	Episode 8	9
Anujin 'Akuna' Khatanbaatar	18	1.75 m (5 ft 9 in)	Episode 9	8-7
Tserennadmid 'Dino' Beina	18	1.75 m (5 ft 9 in)	Episode 9	8-7
Alongoo 'Nuna' Tungalagtamir	22	1.76 m (5 ft 9 1/2 in)	Episode 10	6
Ankhzaya 'Zaya' Bagahuu	19	1.74 m (5 ft 8 1/2 in)	Episode 11	5-4
Nomindar 'Dieu' Erkhembayar	21	1.70 m (5 ft 7 in)	Episode 11	5-4
Mönkhtsolmon 'Tsolmon' Gantulga	21	1.67 m (5 ft 5 1/2 in)	Episode 12	3
Khatan-Erdene 'Khatnaa' Naranbyamba	20	1.78 m (5 ft 10 in)	Episode 12	2
Khaliun 'Hanna' Buyankhishig	21	1.77 m (5 ft 9 1/2 in)	Episode 12	1

== Episode summaries ==
=== Episode 1 ===
Original airdate: 24 October 2021

This was the casting episode. The 20 semifinalists had a runway show and a photoshoot in a tracking field. At panel they were narrowed down to the top 16. After the casting, they move into their model villa, where they will live throughout the competition.

- First call-out: Dieu Erkhembayar
- Eliminated: Amy Ayalguu, Lynkhua Baatar, Nami Namuun & Nomio Nomintuyaa

=== Episode 2 ===
Original airdate: 31 October 2021

- Challenge winner: Tsolmon Gantulga
- Immune from elimination: Darikona Damdinsuren, Dieu Erkhembayar, Khatnaa Naranbyamba, Mendy Amgalanbaatar, Naraa Ganbaatar, Nuna Tungalagtamir, Tsolmon Gantulga, Undrakh Tumurchudur
- First call-out: Tsolmon Gantulga
- First Eliminated: Undraa Mönkhbaatar
- Bottom two: Anu Timüüjin & Dino Beina
- Eliminated: None

=== Episode 3 ===
Original airdate: 7 November 2021

- Challenge winner: Khatnaa Naranbyamba
- First call-out: Dino Beina
- Bottom two: Mendy Amgalanbaatar & Undrakh Tumurchudur
- Eliminated: Mendy Amgalanbaatar

=== Episode 4 ===
Original airdate: 14 November 2021

- Challenge winner: Anu Timüüjin
- Immune from elimination: Akuna Khatanbaatar, Darikona Damdinsuren, Dieu Erkhembayar, Dino Beina, Khatnaa Naranbyamba, Nuna Tungalagtamir & Sondor Ganzul
- First call-out: Dieu Erkhembaya
- First Eliminated: Khulanii Gansukh
- Bottom two: Anu Timüüjin & Zaya Bagahuu
- Eliminated: Anu Timüüjin

=== Episode 5 ===
Original airdate: 21 November 2021

- First call-out: Hanna Buyankhishig
- Bottom two: Darikona Damdinsuren & Undrakh Tumurchudur
- Eliminated: Darikona Damdinsuren

=== Episode 6 ===
Original airdate: 28 November 2021

- Challenge winner: Naraa Ganbaatar
- Immune from elimination: Dieu Erkhembayar, Dino Beina, Khatnaa Naranbyamba, Nuna Tungalagtamir, Tsolmon Gantulga & Undrakh Tumurchudur
- First call-out: Khatnaa Naranbyamba
- Bottom two: Naraa Ganbaatar & Zaya Bagahuu
- Eliminated: Naraa Ganbaatar

=== Episode 7 ===
Original airdate: 5 December 2021

- Challenge winner: Nuna Tungalagtamir
- First call-out: Akuna Khatanbaatar
- Bottom two: Tsolmon Gantulga & Undrakh Tumurchudur
- Eliminated: Undrakh Tumurchudur

=== Episode 8 ===
Original airdate: 12 December 2021

- Challenge winner: Hanna Buyankhishig
- Immune from elimination: Akuna Khatanbaatar, Dino Beina, Nuna Tungalagtamir, Tsolmon Gantulga & Zaya Bagahuu
- Bottom two: Dieu Erkhembayar & Sondor Ganzul
- Eliminated: Sondor Ganzul

=== Episode 9 ===
Original airdate: 19 December 2021

- Challenge winner: Tsolmon Gantulga
- First call-out: Tsolmon Gantulga
- Bottom two: Akuna Khatanbaatar & Dino Beina
- Eliminated: Akuna Khatanbaatar & Dino Beina

=== Episode 10 ===
Original airdate: 26 December 2021

- Challenge winner: Hanna Buyankhishig
- Immune from elimination: Dieu Erkhembayar, Khatnaa Naranbyamba & Tsolmon Gantulga
- First call-out: Khatnaa Naranbyamba
- Bottom three: Hanna Buyankhishig, Nuna Tungalagtamir & Zaya Bagahuu
- Eliminated: Nuna Tungalagtamir

=== Episode 11 ===
Original airdate: 2 January 2022

- Challenge winner: Dieu Erkhembayar
- First call-out: Tsolmon Gantulga
- Eliminated: Dieu Erkhembayar & Zaya Bagahuu

=== Episode 12: Finale ===
Original airdate: 9 January 2022

- Final three: Hanna Buyankhishig, Khatnaa Naranbyamba & Tsolmon Gantulga
- Eliminated: Tsolmon Gantulga
- Final two: Hanna Buyankhishig & Khatnaa Naranbyamba
- Winner: Hanna Buyankhishig

== Result table ==
Place	Model	Episodes											
Place	Model	1	2 (Note: In episode 2, the models were divided into two groups. Darikona, Dieu, Khatnaa, Mendy, Naraa, Nuna, Tsolmon, Undrakh were all immuned for winning the challenge leaving Anu, Akuna, Dino, Hanna, Khulanii, Sondor, Undraa, Zaya up for elimination and had a Runway Face Off. They were called one by one and told if they made it or not.)	3	4 (Note: In episode 4, the models were divided into two groups. Akuna, Darikona, Dieu, Dino, Khatnaa, Nuna, and Sondor were all immuned for winning the challenge leaving Anu, Hanna, Khulanii, Naraa, Tsolmon, Undrakh, and Zaya up for elimination and had a Runway Face Off. They were called one by one and told if they made it or not.)	5	6 (Note: In episode 6, the models were divided into two groups. Dieu, Dino, Khatnaa, Nuna, Tsolmon, and Undrakh were all immuned for winning the challenge leaving Akuna, Hanna, Naraa, Sondor, and Zaya up for elimination and had a Runway Face Off. They were called one by one and told if they made it or not.)	7	8 (Note: In episode 8, the models were divided into two groups. Akuna, Dino, Nuna, Tsolmon, and Zaya were all immuned for winning the challenge leaving Dieu, Hanna, Khatnaa, and Sondor up for elimination and had a Runway Face Off. They were called one by one and told if they made it or not.)	9	10 (Note: In episode 10, the models were divided into two groups. Dieu, Khatnaa and Tsolmon were all immuned for winning the challenge leaving Hanna, Nuna, and Zaya up for elimination and had a Runway Face Off. They were called one by one and told if they made it or not.)	11 (Note: In episode 11, the models were called in random order and told if they made it or not.)	12
1	Hanna	SAFE	SAFE	SAFE	SAFE	HIGH	SAFE	SAFE	SAFE	SAFE	SAFE	SAFE	WIN
2	Khatnaa	SAFE	IMM	SAFE	SAFE	SAFE	HIGH	SAFE	SAFE	SAFE	HIGH	LOW	OUT
3	Tsolmon	SAFE	HIGH	SAFE	SAFE	SAFE	IMM	LOW	IMM	HIGH	IMM	HIGH	OUT
4-5	Dieu	HIGH	IMM	SAFE	HIGH	SAFE	IMM	SAFE	LOW	SAFE	IMM	OUT	
4-5	Zaya	SAFE	SAFE	SAFE	LOW	SAFE	LOW	SAFE	IMM	SAFE	SAFE	OUT	
6	Nuna	SAFE	IMM	SAFE	IMM	SAFE	IMM	SAFE	IMM	SAFE	OUT		
7-8	Akuna	SAFE	SAFE	SAFE	IMM	SAFE	SAFE	HIGH	IMM	OUT			
7-8	Dino	SAFE	LOW	HIGH	IMM	SAFE	IMM	SAFE	IMM	OUT			
9	Sondor	SAFE	SAFE	SAFE	IMM	SAFE	SAFE	SAFE	OUT				
10	Undrakh	SAFE	IMM	LOW	SAFE	LOW	IMM	OUT					
11	Naraa	SAFE	IMM	SAFE	SAFE	SAFE	OUT						
12	Darikona	SAFE	IMM	SAFE	IMM	OUT							
13-14	Anu	SAFE	LOW	SAFE	OUT								
13-14	Khulanii	SAFE	SAFE	SAFE	OUT								
15	Mendy	SAFE	IMM	OUT									
16	Undraa	SAFE	OUT										

The contestant was immune from elimination
The contestant won the best photo
The contestant was in danger of elimination
The contestant was eliminated
The contestant won the competition

=== Photo shoots ===
- Episode 1 photo shoot: Posing at a track field (casting)
- Episode 2 photo shoot: Futuristic on stilts in pairs
- Episode 3 photo shoot: Posing with a MOZO Car
- Episode 4 photo shoot: Food & beverage ads in pairs
- Episode 5 photo shoot: Futuristic Marie Antoinette for Oroblu
- Episode 6 photo shoot: Cyberpunk players for VOO
- Episode 7 photo shoot: Posing on a raft by a lake
- Episode 8 photo shoot: Dansran jewelry beauty shot in B/W
- Episode 9 photo shoot: Alice in Wonderland in a dollhouse
- Episode 10 photo shoot: Train travellers for BABA
- Episode 11 photo shoot: Michael Kors BGB catalogue
- Episode 12 photo shoot: Posing at the end of the runway with golden background
