= People's Artist (TV series) =

- Created by: Simon Fuller
- Country of origin: Russia
- No. of seasons: 3

Original release
- Network: Rossiya
- Release: 2003 – 2006

People's Artist (Russian: Народный Артист, romanized: Narodny Artist) is a Russian music competition television series, based on the British reality television series Pop Idol. It was produced by RTR in association with FBI Music and FremantleMedia. Season 1 and 2 were hosted by Fyokla Tolstaya and Ivan Urgant.

People's Artist remains today the only Idol series to feature miming in their "best of" show (Финальный Концерт final'niy kontsert), as none of the contestants sang live.

== Season 1 ==
Aleksey Goman won season one, with Aleksandr Panayotov coming in second.

=== Finalists ===
(ages stated at time of contest)

Contestant	Age	Hometown	Voted Off	Liveshow Theme
Aleksey Goman	20		Winner	Grand Finale
Aleksandr Panayotov	19		19 December 2003	Grand Finale
Aleksey Chumakov	22		5 December 2003	Songs by Alla Pugacheva/Filipp Kirkorov
Mariya Zaytseva	20		28 November 2003	Songs by Igor Krutoy
Oksana Kazakova	21		21 November 2003	Contestant's Choice
Anna Alina	22		14 November 2003	Songs by Igor Nikolaev
Natalya Pavolotskaya	19		6 November 2003	Film Songs
Irina Toporez	22		31 October 2003	Songs by David Tukhmanov
Yuliya Valeeva	25		24 October 2003	Rhythm and Melody
Irina Chernishova	20	Saint Petersburg	17 October 2003	Old Songs

== Season 2 ==
Kyiv, Ukraine and Minsk, Belarus were included in the auditions this season which resulted in almost all finalists from that season coming from one of the two countries and no auditions outside of Russia being held in the next season.

=== Finalists ===
(ages stated at time of contest)

Contestant	Age	Hometown	Voted Off	Liveshow Theme
Ruslan Alehno	22	Minsk	Winner	Grand Finale
Paulina Dmitrenko	20	Kharkiv	19 December 2004	Grand Finale
Yury Ignatov	26	Tyumen	11 December 2004	
Yuliya Vdovenko	20	Kyiv	4 December 2004	
Evgeniy Anishko	20	Kyiv	20 November 2004	
Vera Karetnikova	20	Minsk	13 November 2004	
Dilyara Vagapova	19	Kazan	6 November 2004	
Vladislav Shlykov	24	Pavlohrad	30 October 2004	
Tatyana Kazyuchits	18	Minsk	23 October 2004	
Darya Urizchenko	25	Minsk	16 October 2004	

== Season 3 ==
This season had auditions in Moscow, Voronezh, Saratov, Kazan, Kaliningrad, Saint Petersburg, Irkutsk and Chelyabinsk. The 125 chosen candidates (35 males and 90 females) advanced to Moscow in the theatre round where they were reduced to 10 finalists to perform live on television. Season three was hosted by Olga Shelest and Oskar Kuchera. On 3 June 2006 Amarkhuu Borkhuu won with 61.7% of the vote over Marina Devyatova.

The jury this season was:

- Evgeniy Fridlyand
- Maksim Dunayevsky
- Gennady Khazanov
- Alena Sviridova
