= Premyer-Ministr =

Russian musical group

Premyer-Ministr Премьер-министр
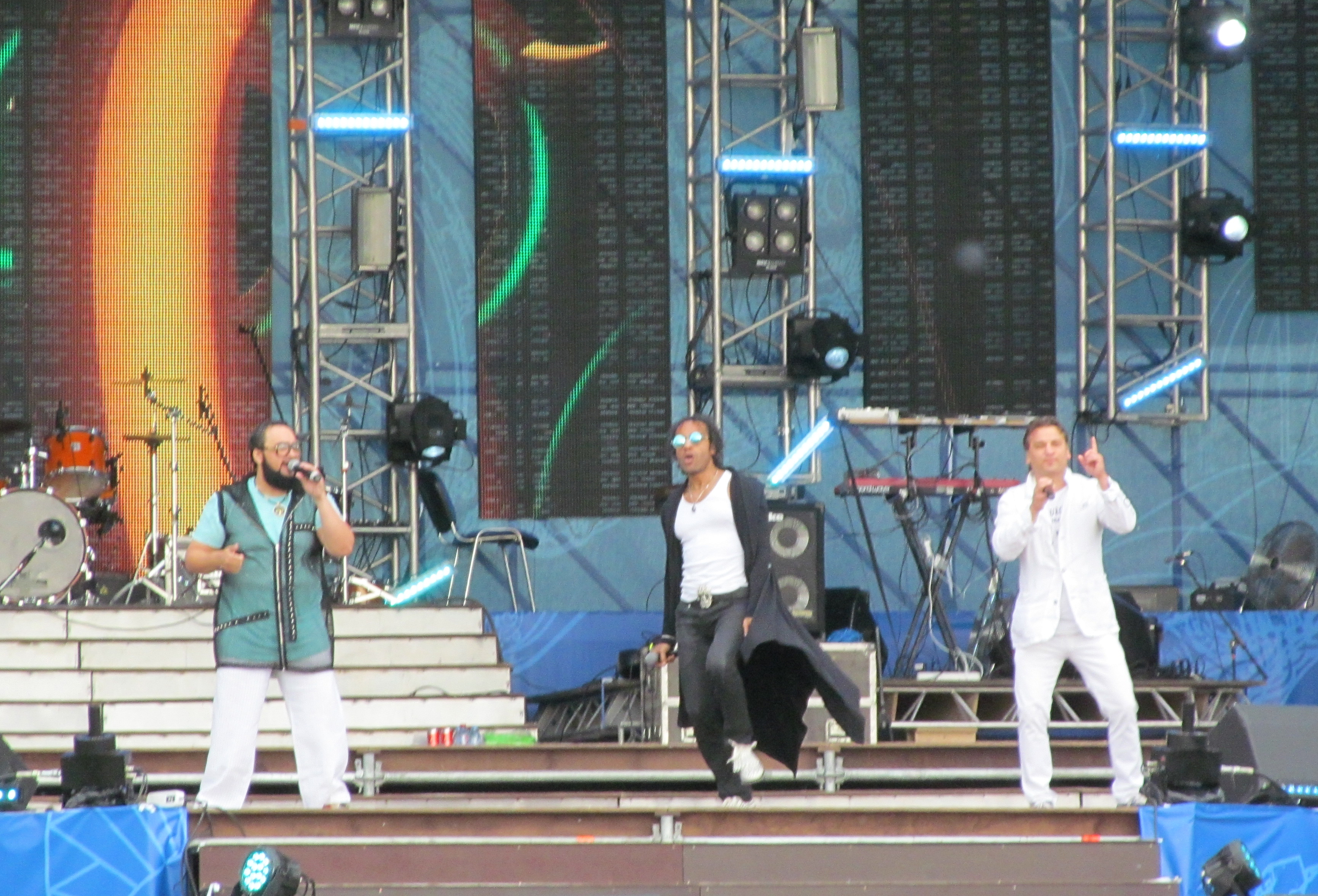

Background information
- Origin: Russia
- Genres: Pop rock, Trance Pop, Soul
- Years active: 1997–present
- Website: Official site

Premyer-Ministr (Russian: Премьер-министр, lit. Prime minister) is a Russian musical group. The idea behind the band was to form a boy band, though not especially for teenagers. Four men came together to form Premier Ministr in 1997. Their first real success came in 2000 with the remake of a Russian tune, "Oriental Song".

In 2001 one of the members, Dmitry Lanskoy, left the group for a solo career and was replaced.

In 2005, the group members split with their producer and started independent career as Group PM, while Premier Ministr was started anew with Taras Demchuk, Sergey Demyanchuk, Amarkhuu Borkhuu, and Vasily Kireyev.

Awards and achievements
Preceded by Mumiy Troll with "Lady Alpine Blue"	Russia in the Eurovision Song Contest; 2002	Succeeded by t.A.T.u. with "Ne ver', ne boysia"
