= Aleksey Goman =

Russian pop singer (born 1983)

Aleksey Goman Алексей Гоман
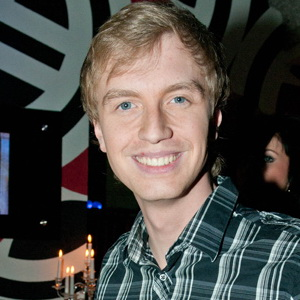
- Aleksey Goman, 2010
- Born: 12 September 1983 (age 43); Murmansk, RSFSR, USSR
- Occupations: Singer, songwriter
- Years active: 2003–present
- Musical career
- Genres: Pop, Russian romance, Russian chanson
- Website: http://www.goman.ru

Aleksey Vladimirovich Goman (Russian: Алексей Владимирович Гоман; born 12 September 1983) is a Russian pop singer, composer and television presenter, who rose to popularity after winning the first season of Narodny Artist, the Russian version of Pop Idol.

== Early life ==
Goman was born in Murmansk in 1983. His family background is modest; his father worked as an electrician and his mother was involved in the military. His mother made Goman enthusiastic for music and taught him to play guitar at a young age. As a child, he was involved in performing in a small children's group at the local Palace of Culture. Both Goman's parents died early. His father died of the consequences of asthma when Goman was fourteen and his mother died of a lung disease not much later.

After finishing the ninth class, Goman studied to become electrician, specialising in the repair of trolleybus lines. At the time, he started working in a trolleybus depot. He then transferred to the Murmansk Arctic State University for the specialist degree in social and cultural studies.

== Career ==
As a young singer, Goman participated in several small and local music competitions. At the age of 19, he applied for the auditions of Narodny Artist. Goman only learned about the auditions while being on holiday in Sochi and decided to cut his holidays short to go to Moscow for the audition. He passed the auditions and ended up among the last thirty contestants in the semi-finals.

Goman did not only receive attention for his vocals but also for his appearance and modest background. Tall, blonde and blue-eyed, he resembled the stereotypical image of an average, white Russian guy. Although not directly considered a favourite for the victory, Goman won the competition in December 2003, defeating Aleksandr Panayotov. Goman was the only contestant in the first season to not end up in the bottom two or three of any of the shows. His final song, "Russkiy paren'" (English: Russian guy), became his first single.

After Narodny Artist, Goman performed several duets with Ruslan Alekhno, who had won the second season of the show. They were the prize winner of Festival of Patriotic songs with "This is my Homeland" devoted to Victory Day anniversary. Next to that, they released the duet "Dve sestry", dedicated to the friendship of Belarus and Russia. In 2006, Goman represented Russia at the Slavianski Bazaar, finishing in second place.

In 2008, Goman received commercial success with his single "May", which peaked at #28 at the TopHit charts. His third album, May, was released shortly after. Around this time, Goman started to focus on songwriting next to performing too.

In 2014, he received the Medal of the Order "For Merit to the Fatherland" of the 2nd class. In 2017, he received the 1st class of this medal. That same year, Goman also received a medal for performing in Syria.

He appeared in the fifth season of ice show contest Ice Age.

== Discography ==
=== Albums ===
Russian	English	Year
Русский парень	Russian guy	2004
Луч солнца золотого	Ray of the golden sun	2006
Май	May	2008

=== Videos ===
Original	English	Year
Русский парень	Russian guy	2005
Облака	Clouds	2005
Май	May	2008
Завелась	Gone wrong	2008
