= Irena Yebuah Tiran =

Slovene singer

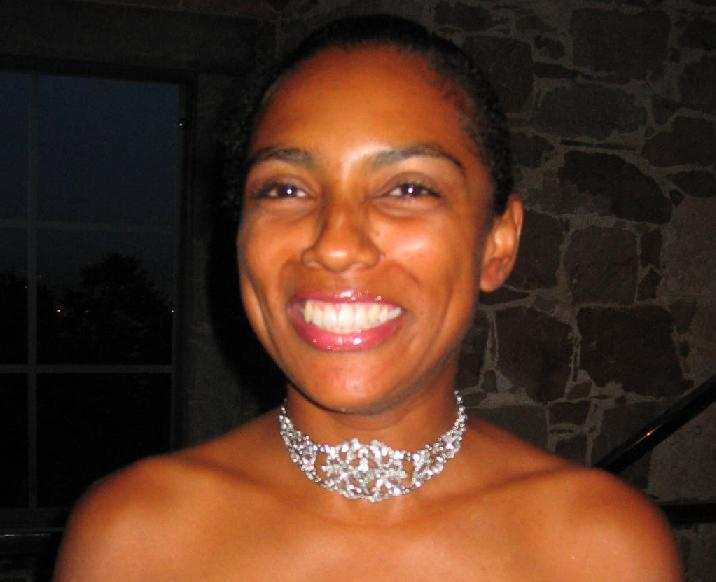

Background information
- Born: March 25, 1974 (age 51)
- Occupation: Opera singer
- Years active: 2000–present

Irena Yebuah Tiran (born March 25, 1974) is a Slovenian mezzo-soprano opera singer of Ghanaian descent.

She graduated with honors from Mozarteum University of Salzburg under prof. Ingrid Mayr (Ingrid Janser-Mayr) and completed post-graduate studies in lied and oratorio with prof. Wolfgang Holzmair. Her debut was in Ljubljana Opera House as Cherubino in Mozart's The Marriage of Figaro in 2000. She is a recipient of several awards.

She was on the jury panel of the first season of the Slovenian version of the Your Face Sounds Familiar show.
