= Takis Zacharatos =

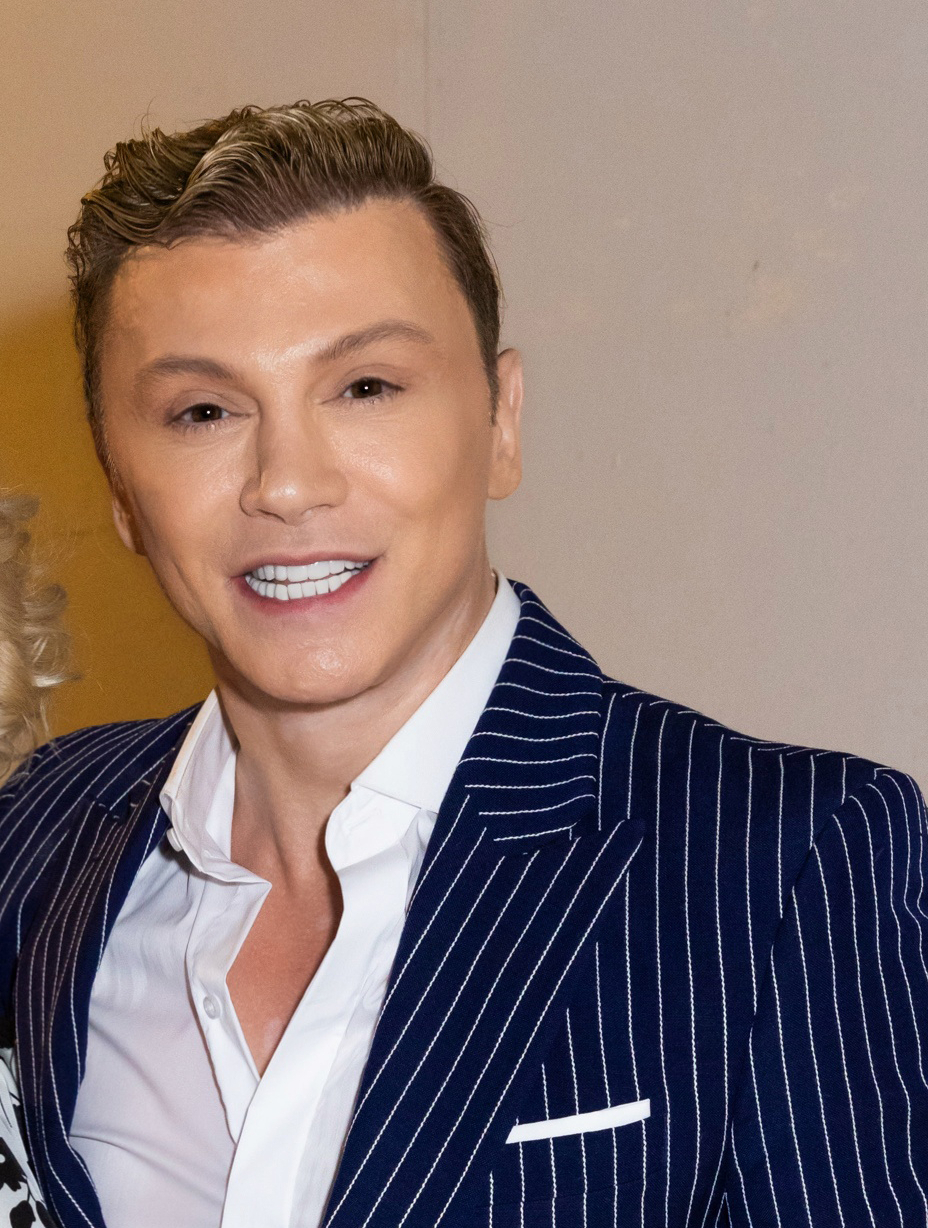
- Born: Panagiotis Zacharatos; June 6, 1967 (age 59); Patras, Achaea, Greece
- Occupations: mime, comedian, singer, actor and parodist
- Years active: 1990-present

Panagiotis (Takis) Zacharatos (born June 6, 1967) is a Greek artist, singer and actor, known for his impersonations of personalities from the Greek and global artistic scene and politics.

== Biography ==
Zacharatos was born on June 6, 1967 in Patras. His first jobs were in gymnastics and then he became a hairdresser.

He gradually became known for his impersonations until Roula Koromila asked him to collaborate with her on ERT and later on the show Proinos Kafes on ANT1. He took voice lessons with Julie Massino. In cinema, he acted for the first time in the film Pano kato kai plagios by Michalis Cacogiannis and in "Beautiful People" by Nikos Panagiotopoulos.

In his musical performances, he has collaborated, among others, with Andreas Voutsinas in the performance "YPARCHO" in Thessaloniki, with Stamatis Kraounakis in the Zoom nightclub, with Sofia Spyratou in Morphes and at Regency Casino Thessaloniki, and with Dimitris Papazoglou with music by Nikos Danikas in Intriga and Medusa.

He has participated as a guest star in many television shows such as Eglimata, To kokkino domatio, Tis Ellados ta Paidia, Mana einai mono mia, Al Tsantiri News. In 2005, he presented the show Zo ena Drama.

He released the records: Eglimata Kardias (1994) and Oloi oi dromoi (2005) while he has also participated in Etsi De's record, "Ya Mas" with the song "Me Prada mes Lada".

He began acting in theater in 2008 in Sesouar gia dolofonous, in the 10th season of the play, and in 2009 in Dimitris Psathas' comedy I Chartopaixtra. In 2010 he performed a one-man show titled My Way while in 2011 a new one-man show titled Edo and in 2012 he staged I am what I am.

In 2017, he staged the play Ston kathrefti tou Pallas, together with Marinella, written by Yannis Xanthoulis and directed by Stamatis Fasoulis.
