= Denis Avdić =

Slovenian comedian

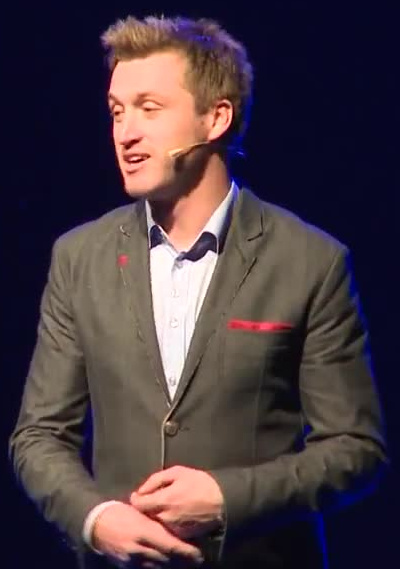
- Born: January 31, 1982 (age 44); Gračanica/SR Bosnia and Herzegovina, SFR Yugoslavia
- Occupations: Radio personality, TV personality

Denis Avdić (born 31 January 1982) is a Slovenian comedian, former police officer and radio host, most known for impersonating politicians in Slovenia, including Janez Janša and Zoran Janković.

== Life ==
He was born in Bosnia and Herzegovina and relocated to Slovenia at age 10 to live with his father. Prior to this he was raised by his grandmother and his aunt, after his mother left him when she remarried. After finishing school, he worked as a policeman during the day and as a radio host during the night.

== Work ==
He is most known for his impersonations of Slovenian politicians published both on radio and on YouTube. In 2010, he called Jadranka Kosor, at the time the Prime minister of Croatia, pretending to be Janez Janša and talked to her while impersonating him.

== Awards ==
In 2010, 2011 and 2012, he received the Slovenian popular media Viktor Award for the radio personality of the year.
