= Amarkhuu Borkhuu =

Mongolian singer (born 1987)

- Born: Borkhüügiin Amarkhüü; 1 July 1987 (age 38); Bulgan Province, Mongolia
- Genres: Pop, R'n'B
- Occupations: Singer, actor
- Years active: 2003–present
- Label: FBI Music

Amarkhuu Borkhuu (Mongolian: Борхүүгийн Амархүү, Borkhüügiin Amarkhüü; born 1 July 1987) is a Mongolian pop singer and actor.

== Life ==
When he was a child his parents moved from Mongolia to Ulan-Ude, Buryatia in Russia.

In 2006, four of his best friends, including Buryatian friend Dorj, recommended him to go to Irkutsk to participate in show Narodniy Artist 3. He rose to popularity in Russia after winning Narodniy Artist 3 (2006), the Russian version of Pop Idol with 61.7% of the vote over Marina Devyatova. In 2010, he starred in a Mongolian-Russian film Operation Tatar, where he first met his wife Ariunzul. He is a frontman of award-winning boy band Prime Minister.

On 19 September 2019 he was arrested by Mongolian police officers while using marijuana which is illegal in Mongolia. He is now in the process of serving 2 years in prison.

In December 2019, he has been acquitted from his 2-year term from the court of appeal and has promised to join the campaign against illegal use of drugs in Mongolia.
