= Edutainment TV =

Mongolian television channel

Edutainment TV Боловсрол суваг
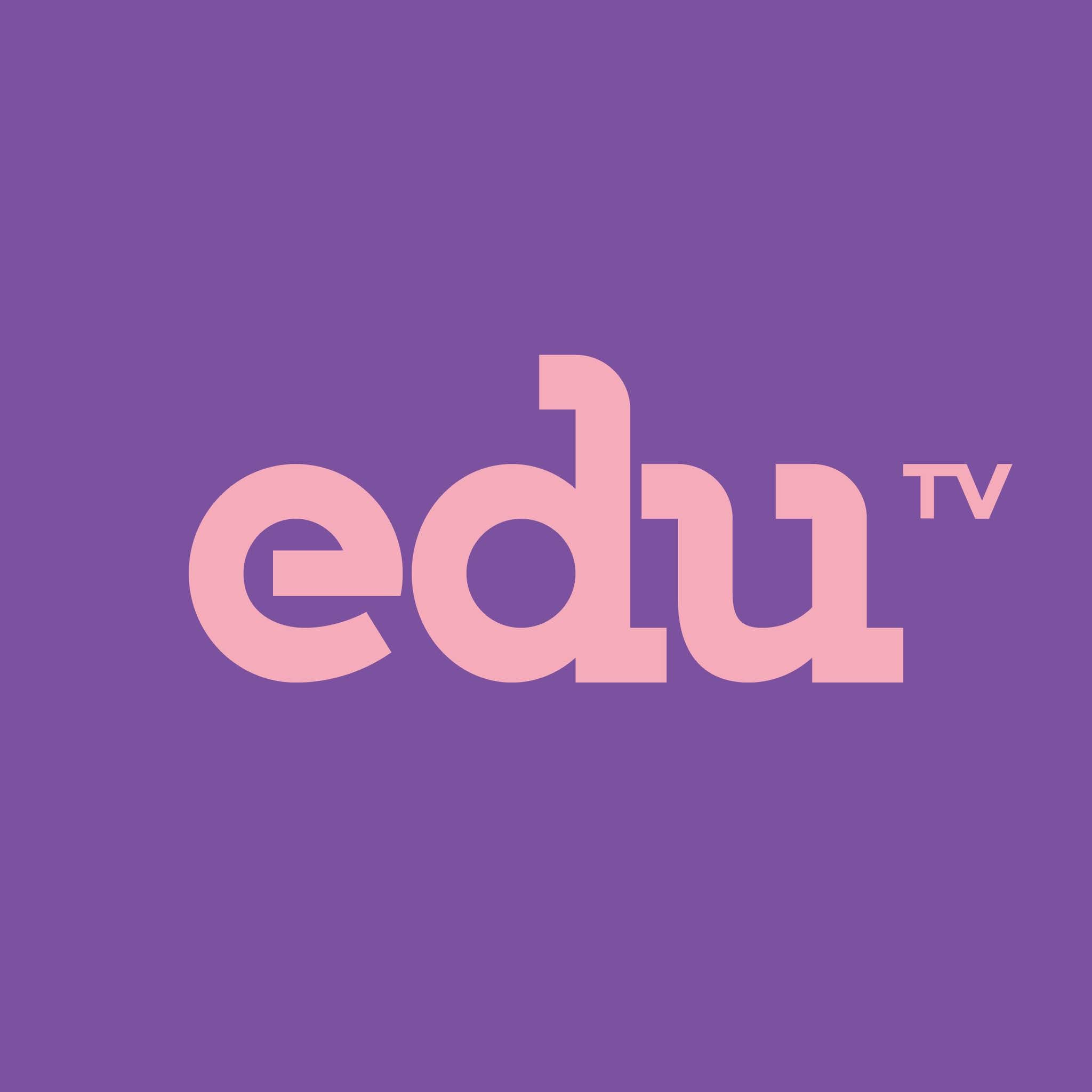
- Country: Mongolia
- Headquarters: Ulaanbaatar, Mongolia

Programming
- Picture format: 16:9

History
- Launched: July 2007

Links
- Website: www.edutv.mn

Edutainment TV (Mongolian: Боловсрол суваг, Bolovsrol suvag), also abbreviated EduTV, is a television broadcaster in Mongolia.

This TV channel is popular in Mongolia for airing K-Dramas in Mongolian dubbing at 19:00 local time and also air Russian dramas at 12:00 pm local time.

The TV channel is also popular among young viewers for airing cartoons which include Tobot (Тобот), Miniforce (Минифорс), Transformers (Хувиргагч Роботууд), Kongsuni and Friends (Консуни ба Найзууд), Kung Fu Panda, Mr. Bean (Ноён Бийн), My Little Pony (Миний Бяцхан Одой Морь), Tayo the Little Bus (Бяцхан Автобус Таёо), Munkh Tunkh (Мөнх Тунх), Zuuzuu's friends (Зуузуугийн Найзууд), Pigland, Winx Club (Шидэтнүүдийн Клуб), Bread Barbershop (Ноён Талхны Үсчний Газар), Pororo (Пороро), Monkart (Монкарт), Gigantosaurus (Үлэг Гүрвэлийн Адал Явдал), Catch! Teenieping (Бариарай! Тинпини), G-Fighters, Bultsgar (Булцгар), Player Alecs (Тоглогч Алекс), 50 Heroes (Нэгдмэл Хүч) and Teen Titans Go! (Урагшаа Титануудаа). All are aired in Mongolian dub and usually around 17:00 to 19:00 local time.

All the other TV programs aired by the channel include Great Paintings (Аугаа Уран Зургууд), World Atlas (Дэлхийн Атлас), Mongolians in Early 20th Century, Mongolians Advancing into Socialism, two books that were made into historical TV series in Mongolian as Монголчууд 20-р зууны эхэнд and Монголчууд нийгэм журамд давшин орсон нь, and Guess the Song (Аяыг Таа). The TV channel also collaborated with JET - School of English to create "Learning English Online" (Англи хэлний алсын зайн сургалт) program for people to learn English in Mongolia, and creating the same program but for Chinese, Korean, and Japanese languages.

They also air popular foreign TV shows with official permission into Mongolian, such as Your Face Sounds Familiar (Яг Түүн Шиг), Are You Smarter than a 5th Grader? (Та 5-р Ангийн Хүүхдээс Ухаантай Юу?), Thank God You're Here (Бурхны Аварлаар Чи Ирлээ), and The Million Pound Drop (50 Саяын Уналт/80 Саяын Уналт).

This TV channel also aired its own comedy TV shows, including "The Three Friends" (Гурван найз), "Funny Family" (Хөгжилтэй гэр бүл), "Big City Guys" (Их хотын залуус), "Traffic Lights" (Гэрлэн дохио), "Full Life" (Бүтэн амьдрал) and "Unexpected Guests" (Гэнэтийн зочид).

== See also ==
- Media of Mongolia
- Communications in Mongolia
