= List of Tvoje lice zvuči poznato (Croatian TV series) episodes =

Tvoje lice zvuči poznato is a Croatian singing reality television series based on Your Face Sounds Familiar. Each season features a cast of celebrities impersonating famous singers. In each episode, a jury of professionals, along with the contestants, typically selects a winner, while the season concludes with one standout performer who earns the most points overall and is declared the winner of the season.

The series premiered on 5 October 2014 on Nova TV.

== Series overview ==
Season	Stars	Episodes	Originally released		Winner	Runner-up
Season	Stars	Episodes	First released	Last released	Winner	Runner-up
1	8	12	5 October 2014	21 December 2014	Mario Petreković	Vanda Winter
2	8	12	13 September 2015	6 December 2015	Saša Lozar	Luka Bulić
3	8	13	25 September 2016	18 December 2016	Damir Kedžo	Ana Maras Harmander
4	8	13	5 March 2017	28 May 2017	Nives Celzijus	Bojan Jambrošić
5	8	13	18 March 2018	10 June 2018	Maja Bajamić	Katarina Baban
6	8	16	8 March 2020	27 December 2020	Fabijan Pavao Medvešek	Marko Braić
7	8	8	25 April 2021	13 June 2021	Saša Lozar	Maja Bajamić
8	8	13	3 March 2024	26 May 2024	Alen Bičević	Antonia Dora Pleško
9	8	13	9 March 2025	1 June 2025	Stela Rade	Marcela Oroši
10	8	13	8 March 2026	31 May 2026	Sven Pocrnić	TBA

=== Season 1 (2014) ===
No. overall	No. in season	Title	Winner	Original release date
1	1	"Episode 1"	TBA	5 October 2014
2	2	"Episode 2"	TBA	12 October 2014
3	3	"Episode 3"	TBA	19 October 2014
4	4	"Episode 4"	TBA	26 October 2014
5	5	"Episode 5"	TBA	2 November 2014
6	6	"Episode 6"	TBA	9 November 2014
7	7	"Episode 7"	TBA	16 November 2014
8	8	"Episode 8"	TBA	23 November 2014
9	9	"Episode 9"	TBA	30 November 2014
10	10	"Episode 10"	TBA	7 December 2014
11	11	"Episode 11"	TBA	14 December 2014
12	12	"Episode 12"	TBA	21 December 2014

=== Season 2 (2015) ===
No. overall	No. in season	Title	Winner	Original release date
13	1	"Episode 1"	TBA	13 September 2015
14	2	"Episode 2"	TBA	20 September 2015
15	3	"Episode 3"	TBA	27 September 2015
16	4	"Episode 4"	TBA	4 October 2015
17	5	"Episode 5"	TBA	11 October 2015
18	6	"Episode 6"	TBA	18 October 2015
19	7	"Episode 7"	TBA	25 October 2015
20	8	"Episode 8"	TBA	1 November 2015
21	9	"Episode 9"	TBA	15 November 2015
22	10	"Episode 10"	TBA	22 November 2015
23	11	"Episode 11"	TBA	29 November 2015
24	12	"Episode 12"	TBA	6 December 2015

=== Season 3 (2016) ===
No. overall	No. in season	Title	Winner	Original release date
25	1	"Episode 1"	TBA	25 September 2016
26	2	"Episode 2"	TBA	2 October 2016
27	3	"Episode 3"	TBA	9 October 2016
28	4	"Episode 4"	TBA	16 October 2016
29	5	"Episode 5"	TBA	23 October 2016
30	6	"Episode 6"	TBA	30 October 2016
31	7	"Episode 7"	TBA	6 November 2016
32	8	"Episode 8"	TBA	13 November 2016
33	9	"Episode 9"	TBA	20 November 2016
34	10	"Episode 10"	TBA	27 November 2016
35	11	"Episode 11"	TBA	4 December 2016
36	12	"Episode 12"	TBA	11 December 2016
37	13	"Episode 13"	TBA	13 December 2016

=== Season 4 (2017) ===
No. overall	No. in season	Title	Winner	Original release date
38	1	"Episode 1"	TBA	5 March 2017
39	2	"Episode 2"	TBA	12 March 2017
40	3	"Episode 3"	TBA	19 March 2017
41	4	"Episode 4"	TBA	26 March 2017
42	5	"Episode 5"	TBA	2 April 2017
43	6	"Episode 6"	TBA	9 April 2017
44	7	"Episode 7"	TBA	16 April 2017
45	8	"Episode 8"	TBA	23 April 2017
46	9	"Episode 9"	TBA	30 April 2017
47	10	"Episode 10"	TBA	7 May 2017
48	11	"Episode 11"	TBA	14 May 2017
49	12	"Episode 12"	TBA	21 May 2017
50	13	"Episode 13"	TBA	28 May 2017

=== Season 5 (2018) ===
No. overall	No. in season	Title	Winner	Original release date
51	1	"Episode 1"	TBA	18 March 2018
52	2	"Episode 2"	TBA	25 March 2018
53	3	"Episode 3"	TBA	1 April 2018
54	4	"Episode 4"	TBA	8 April 2018
55	5	"Episode 5"	TBA	15 April 2018
56	6	"Episode 6"	TBA	22 April 2018
57	7	"Episode 7"	TBA	29 April 2018
58	8	"Episode 8"	TBA	6 May 2018
59	9	"Episode 9"	TBA	13 May 2018
60	10	"Episode 10"	TBA	20 May 2018
61	11	"Episode 11"	TBA	27 May 2018
62	12	"Episode 12"	TBA	3 June 2018
63	13	"Episode 13"	TBA	10 June 2018

=== Season 6 (2020) ===
No. overall	No. in season	Title	Winner	Original release date
64	1	"Episode 1"	Fabijan Pavao Medvešek as Queen	8 March 2020
65	2	"Episode 2"	Lana Klingor Mihić as Luis Fonsi and Demi Lovato	15 March 2020
66	3	"Episode 3"	Lu Jakelić as Ciara and Missy Elliott	27 September 2020
67	4	"Episode 4"	Fabijan Pavao Medvešek as Ed Sheeran and Andrea Bocelli	4 October 2020
68	5	"Episode 5"	Marko Braić as Eleni Foureira	11 October 2020
69	6	"Episode 6"	Marko Braić as Red Hot Chili Peppers	18 October 2020
70	7	"Episode 7"	Neda Parmać as Fleur East	25 October 2020
71	8	"Episode 8"	Marina Orsag as Lisa Stansfield and Barry White	1 November 2020
72	9	"Episode 9"	Mario Valentić as Alka Yagnik	8 November 2020
73	10	"Episode 10"	Marina Orsag as Tones and I	15 November 2020
74	11	"Episode 11"	Marko Braić as Indira Levak	22 November 2020
75	12	"Episode 12"	Lu Jakelić as Barbra Streisand	29 November 2020
76	13	"Episode 13"	Marko Braić as Rag'n'Bone Man	6 December 2020
77	14	"Episode 14"	Lu Jakelić as Celine Dion	13 December 2020
78	15	"Episode 15"	Siniša Ružić as Petar Grašo	20 December 2020
79	16	"Episode 16"	Fabijan Pavao Medvešek as Hugh Jackman	27 December 2020

=== Season 7: All Stars (2021) ===
No. overall	No. in season	Title	Winner	Original release date
80	1	"Episode 1"	Saša Lozar as Vice Vukov	25 April 2021
81	2	"Episode 2"	Mario Petreković as Stromae	2 May 2021
82	3	"Episode 3"	Saša Lozar as Luciano Pavarotti and James Brown	9 May 2021
83	4	"Episode 4"	Damir Kedžo as Josipa Lisac	16 May 2021
84	5	"Episode 5"	Mario Roth as Master KG and Nomcebo	23 May 2021
85	6	"Episode 6"	Katarina Baban as Maitre Gims	30 May 2021
86	7	"Episode 7"	Maja Bajamić as Tina Turner and Eros Ramazzotti	6 June 2021
87	8	"Episode 8"	Saša Lozar as David Bowie	13 June 2021

=== Season 8: (2024) ===
No. overall	No. in season	Title	Winner	Original release date
88	1	"Episode 1"	Antonia Dora Pleško as Mišo Kovač	3 March 2024
89	2	"Episode 2"	Alen Bičević as Aleksandra Prijović	10 March 2024
90	3	"Episode 3"	Mia Negovetić as Lepa Brena	17 March 2024
91	4	"Episode 4"	Alen Bičević as Gabi Novak	24 March 2024
92	5	"Episode 5"	ToMa as Imagine Dragons	31 March 2024
93	6	"Episode 6"	Luciano Plazibat as Dino Dvornik	7 April 2024
94	7	"Episode 7"	Antonija Dora Pleško as Jennifer Lopez	14 April 2024
95	8	"Episode 8"	Mia Negovetić as Måneskin	21 April 2024
96	9	"Episode 9"	Faris Pinjo as Gazde	28 April 2024
97	10	"Episode 10"	Marija Kolb as Baby Lasagna	5 May 2024
98	11	"Episode 11"	Alen Bičević as Massimo	12 May 2024
99	12	"Episode 12"	ToMa as Josipa Lisac	19 May 2024
100	13	"Episode 13"	Alen Bičević as Hanka Paldum	26 May 2024

=== Season 9 (2025) ===
No. overall	No. in season	Title	Winner	Original release date
101	1	"Episode 1"	Stela Rade as Josipa Lisac	9 March 2025
102	2	"Episode 2"	Marcela Oroši as Doris Dragović	16 March 2025
103	3	"Episode 3"	Mada Peršić as Little Sis Nora	22 March 2025
104	4	"Episode 4"	Igor Cukrov as Tony Cetinski	30 March 2025
105	5	"Episode 5"	Devin Juraj as Maluma	6 April 2025
106	6	"Episode 6"	Igor Cukrov as Oliver Dragojević	13 April 2025
107	7	"Episode 7"	Meri Andraković as Nina Badrić	20 April 2025
108	8	"Episode 8"	Stela Rade as MØ	27 April 2025
109	9	"Episode 9"	Domagoj Nižić as Elvis Presley	4 May 2025
110	10	"Episode 10"	Marcela Oroši as Vesna Zmijanac	11 May 2025
111	11	"Episode 11"	Stela Rade as Hanka Paldum	19 May 2025
112	12	"Episode 12"	Meri Andraković as ABBA	25 May 2025
113	13	"Episode 13"	Stela Rade as Christina Aguilera	1 June 2025

=== Season 10 (2026) ===
No. overall	No. in season	Title	Winner	Original release date
114	1	"Episode 1"	David Amaro as Melody	8 March 2026
115	2	"Episode 2"	Sven Pocrnić as Britney Spears	15 March 2026
116	3	"Episode 3"	Iva Ajduković as Adele	22 March 2026
117	4	"Episode 4"	Lovro Juraga as Vice Vukov	29 March 2026
118	5	"Episode 5"	Nora Ćurković as Anna Vissi	5 April 2026
119	6	"Episode 6"	Dora Trogrlić as Luciano Pavarotti	12 April 2026
120	7	"Episode 7"	Sven Pocrnić as Käärijä	19 April 2026
121	8	"Episode 8"	Sven Pocrnić as Mariah Carey	26 April 2026
122	9	"Episode 9"	Iva Ajduković as Barbara Pravi	3 May 2026
123	10	"Episode 10"	Lovro Juraga as Damiano David	10 May 2026
124	11	"Episode 11"	Laura Sučec as Silvana Armenulić	17 May 2026
125	12	"Episode 12"	Sven Pocrnić as Domenico Modugno	24 May 2026
126	13	"Episode 13"	Sven Pocrnić as Marija Šerifović	31 May 2026
