= Tvoje lice zvuči poznato (Croatian TV series) season 9 =

Tvoje lice zvuči poznato
- Season 9
- Promotional poster for season nine
- Hosted by: Igor Mešin; Filip Detelić
- Judges: Goran Navojec; Minea; Mario Roth; Enis Bešlagić
- No. of contestants: 8
- Winner: Stela Rade
- Runner-up: Marcela Oroši
- No. of episodes: 13

Release
- Original network: Nova TV
- Original release: 9 March – 1 June 2025

Season chronology
- ← Previous; Season 8

The ninth season of Tvoje lice zvuči poznato, the Croatian singing reality television series based on Your Face Sounds Familiar, aired from 9 March to 1 June 2025 on Nova TV.

The season is hosted by Igor Mešin and Filip Detelić, with Goran Navojec, Minea, Mario Roth and Enis Bešlagić on the judging panel. Bešlagić was temporarily replaced by a guest judge for the fourth and the fifth episode of the season.

The winner of the season was Stela Rade, with Marcela Oroši finishing as a runner-up.

== Production ==
In November 2024, Nova TV confirmed that the ninth season of Tvoje lice zvuči poznato is in the works. On 11 February 2025, Igor Mešin and Filip Detelić were confirmed to return as the hosts; both also hosted the previous season. Goran Navojec, Minea, Mario Roth and Enis Bešlagić returned as the judges for the season.

The season premiered on 9 March 2025 at 20:15 on Nova TV. The season consisted of thirteen episodes and concluded on 1 June 2025.

=== Format ===
Each of the eight contestants perform as a famous singer that was assigned to them by the randomizer. After their performance, the judges evaluate the contestants by awarding 4–10 points, as well as 12 points to their favorite performance. Each contestant also awards bonus 5 points to one of their fellow contestants. The highest scoring contestant is declared the winner of the episode.

In the semifinals, the four contestants with the highest overall scores advanced to the final round. At the end of the season, the contestant with the highest total score is declared winner of the season.

== Contestants ==
The eight contestants of the ninth season were revealed on 24 February 2025.

On 18 March 2025, Nova TV announced that Marko Bošnjak will leave the season after the seventh episode due to his preparations for Eurovision Song Contest 2025, where he was arranged to represent Croatia in May of the same year.

Cast of Tvoje lice zvuči poznato season 9
| Celebrity | Notability | Result |
|---|---|---|
| Stela Rade | Singer | Winner |
| Marcela Oroši | Singer | Runner-Up |
| Igor Cukrov | Singer and Croatian representative at Eurovision Song Contest 2009 | 3rd/4th Place |
| Devin Juraj | Singer and dancer | 3rd/4th Place |
| Domagoj Nižić | Actor | Eliminated in Semi-Finals |
| Mada Peršić | Actress | Eliminated in Semi-Finals |
| Meri Andraković | Singer | Eliminated in Semi-Finals |
| Marko Bošnjak | Singer and Croatian representative at Eurovision Song Contest 2025 | Withdrew |

=== Contestant progress ===
Legend:

indicates the highest score of the week
indicates the lowest score of the week

Progress of contestants including total scores each week
| Contestant | Week | | | | | | | | | | | | Total | Finale |
| Contestant | 1 | 2 | 3 | 4 | 5 | 6 | 7 | 8 | 9 | 10 | 11 | 12 | Total | Finale |
|---|---|---|---|---|---|---|---|---|---|---|---|---|---|---|
| Stela | 60 | 45 | 28 | 42 | 51 (Note: Although the contestant had the highest score, they were not declared the winner of the episode, as they tied with another contestant who received higher score from the judges.) | 24 | 48 | 44 | 38 | 42 | 52 | 31 | 505 | 61 |
| Marcela | 35 | 50 | 30 | 31 | 34 | 39 | 36 | 44 | 23 | 55 | 30 | 40 | 447 | 58 |
| Igor | 38 | 36 | 24 | 66 | 39 | 58 | 22 | 39 | 30 | 47 | 28 | 25 | 452 | 47 |
| Devin | 36 | 37 | 52 | 18 | 51 | 22 | 42 | 21 | 41 | 46 | 51 | 33 | 450 | 47 |
| Meri | 28 | 33 | 28 | 33 | 24 | 50 | 49 | 31 | 46 | 29 | 44 | 51 | 446 | |
| Domagoj | 30 | 17 | 38 | 26 | 36 | 20 | 31 | 44 | 55 | 24 | 20 | 46 | 387 | |
| Mada | 32 | 21 | 58 | 22 | 26 | 27 | 26 | 40 | 30 | 20 | 38 | 37 | 377 | |
| Marko | 25 | 45 | 26 | 46 | 23 | 44 | 30 | | | | | | 209 | |

== Episodes ==
=== Week 1 (9 March) ===
The first episode aired on 9 March 2025. Stela Rade won performing as Josipa Lisac.

| Contestant | Performance | Jury points | | | | Bonus points | Total |
| Contestant | Performance | Goran | Minea | Mario | Enis | Bonus points | Total |
|---|---|---|---|---|---|---|---|
| Marko | "Evo mene moji ljudi" by Mladen Grdović | 4 | 4 | 6 | 6 | 5 | 25 |
| Igor | "Rolling in the Deep" by Adele | 9 | 7 | 9 | 8 | 5 | 38 |
| Stela | "O jednoj mladosti" by Josipa Lisac | 12 | 12 | 12 | 9 | 15 | 60 |
| Devin | "If I Could Turn Back Time" by Cher | 8 | 9 | 7 | 7 | 5 | 36 |
| Marcela | "Behute" by Senidah | 5 | 10 | 10 | 10 | 0 | 35 |
| Domagoj | "Fantazija" by Grše | 7 | 6 | 8 | 4 | 5 | 30 |
| Meri | "Milena" by Novi Fosili | 6 | 8 | 4 | 5 | 5 | 28 |
| Mada | "Pedro" by Raffaella Carrà | 10 | 5 | 5 | 12 | 0 | 32 |

=== Week 2 (16 March) ===
The second episode premiered on 16 March 2025. Marcela Oroši won performing as Doris Dragović. Indira Levak and Alka Vuica appeared as special guests.

| Contestant | Performance | Jury points | | | | Bonus points | Total |
| Contestant | Performance | Goran | Minea | Mario | Enis | Bonus points | Total |
|---|---|---|---|---|---|---|---|
| Marko | "Vogue" by Madonna | 10 | 12 | 8 | 10 | 5 | 45 |
| Igor | "I'm Still Standing" by Elton John | 7 | 8 | 9 | 7 | 5 | 36 |
| Stela | "Loco Loco" by Hurricane | 9 | 10 | 12 | 9 | 5 | 45 |
| Devin | "I Wanna Be Your Slave" by Måneskin | 12 | 9 | 10 | 6 | 0 | 37 |
| Marcela | "Dajem ti srce" by Doris Dragović | 8 | 7 | 8 | 8 | 20 | 50 |
| Domagoj | "Varalica" by Alka Vuica | 5 | 4 | 4 | 4 | 0 | 17 |
| Meri | "Najbolje od svega" by Colonia | 4 | 6 | 6 | 12 | 5 | 33 |
| Mada | "Volim te budalo mala" by Frano Lasić | 6 | 5 | 5 | 5 | 0 | 21 |

=== Week 3 (22 March) ===
The third episode premiered on 22 March 2025. Mada Peršić won performing as Little Sis Nora.

| Contestant | Performance | Jury points | | | | Bonus points | Total |
| Contestant | Performance | Goran | Minea | Mario | Enis | Bonus points | Total |
|---|---|---|---|---|---|---|---|
| Marko | "Ti si mi u krvi" by Zdravko Čolić | 6 | 9 | 6 | 5 | 0 | 26 |
| Igor | "Lavica" by Jelena Rozga | 4 | 4 | 4 | 12 | 0 | 24 |
| Stela | "Can't Stop the Feeling!" by Justin Timberlake | 5 | 7 | 10 | 6 | 0 | 28 |
| Devin | "Tea" by Tea Tairović | 8 | 10 | 12 | 7 | 15 | 52 |
| Marcela | "Sjaj u tami" by Massimo | 7 | 6 | 8 | 4 | 5 | 30 |
| Domagoj | "Paint it Black" by the Rolling Stones | 9 | 8 | 7 | 9 | 5 | 38 |
| Meri | "Soltera" by Shakira | 10 | 5 | 5 | 8 | 0 | 28 |
| Mada | "I'm an Albatraoz" by Little Sis Nora | 12 | 12 | 9 | 10 | 15 | 58 |

=== Week 4 (30 March) ===
The fourth episode premiered on 30 March 2025. Maja Šuput replaced Enis Bešlagić as a judge for this episode. Igor Cukrov won performing as Tony Cetinski.

| Contestant | Performance | Jury points | | | | Bonus points | Total |
| Contestant | Performance | Goran | Minea | Mario | Maja | Bonus points | Total |
|---|---|---|---|---|---|---|---|
| Marko | "Nothing Breaks Like a Heart" by Miley Cyrus | 9 | 9 | 9 | 9 | 10 | 46 |
| Igor | "Opet si pobijedila" by Tony Cetinski | 12 | 10 | 12 | 12 | 20 | 66 |
| Stela | "Hymne à l'amour" by Celine Dion | 10 | 12 | 10 | 10 | 0 | 42 |
| Devin | "Volim i postojim" by Petar Grašo | 4 | 6 | 4 | 4 | 0 | 18 |
| Marcela | "Samba do Brasil" by Bellini | 8 | 7 | 8 | 8 | 0 | 31 |
| Domagoj | "Djevojačko veče" by Maja Šuput | 6 | 4 | 6 | 5 | 5 | 26 |
| Meri | "Biggie Boom Boom" by Baby Lasagna | 7 | 8 | 7 | 6 | 5 | 33 |
| Mada | "Pogled ispod obrva" by Severina | 5 | 5 | 5 | 7 | 0 | 22 |

=== Week 5 (6 April) ===
The fifth episode premiered on 6 April 2025. Alen Bičević, the winner of the previous season, replaced Enis Bešlagić as the judge for this episode. The episode ended up in a tie between Devin, who performed as Maluma, and Stela, who performed as Eminem. The jury selected Devin as the winner of the episode.

| Contestant | Performance | Jury points | | | | Bonus points | Total |
| Contestant | Performance | Goran | Minea | Mario | Alen | Bonus points | Total |
|---|---|---|---|---|---|---|---|
| Marko | "Ledena" by Toše Proeski | 4 | 9 | 5 | 5 | 0 | 23 |
| Igor | "Što je ostalo od ljubavi" by Tereza Kesovija | 6 | 7 | 8 | 8 | 10 | 39 |
| Stela | "Lose Yourself" by Eminem | 9 | 10 | 10 | 12 | 10 | 51 |
| Devin | "El Préstamo" by Maluma | 12 | 12 | 12 | 10 | 5 | 51 |
| Marcela | "Gloria" by Umberto Tozzi | 8 | 8 | 9 | 9 | 0 | 34 |
| Domagoj | "Program tvog kompjutera" by Denis & Denis | 10 | 6 | 4 | 6 | 10 | 36 |
| Meri | "Lane moje" by Željko Joksimović | 5 | 4 | 6 | 4 | 5 | 24 |
| Mada | "Dancing in the Dark" by Bruce Springsteen | 7 | 5 | 7 | 7 | 0 | 26 |

=== Week 6 (13 April) ===
The sixth episode premiered on 13 April 2025. Igor Cukrov won performing as Oliver Dragojević, securing his second victory in the season.

| Contestant | Performance | Jury points | | | | Bonus points | Total |
| Contestant | Performance | Goran | Minea | Mario | Enis | Bonus points | Total |
|---|---|---|---|---|---|---|---|
| Marko | "Stupid Love" by Lady Gaga | 10 | 12 | 12 | 10 | 0 | 44 |
| Igor | "Trag u beskraju" by Oliver Dragojević | 9 | 9 | 8 | 12 | 20 | 58 |
| Stela | "Aspirin" by Seka Aleksić | 7 | 7 | 6 | 4 | 0 | 24 |
| Devin | "La noia" by Angelina Mango | 6 | 5 | 4 | 7 | 0 | 22 |
| Marcela | "Ti si pjesma moje duše" by Mišo Kovač | 12 | 10 | 9 | 8 | 0 | 39 |
| Domagoj | "NLO" by Miach | 5 | 4 | 5 | 6 | 0 | 20 |
| Meri | "Love Yourself" / "What Do You Mean?" by Justin Bieber | 8 | 8 | 10 | 9 | 15 | 50 |
| Mada | "Rano" by Minea | 4 | 6 | 7 | 5 | 5 | 27 |

=== Week 7 (20 April) ===
The seventh episode premiered on 20 April 2025. Meri Andraković won performing as Nina Badrić. Jole appeared as special guest. This episode marked the final appearance of Marko Bošnjak as a participant.

| Contestant | Performance | Jury points | | | | Bonus points | Total |
| Contestant | Performance | Goran | Minea | Mario | Enis | Bonus points | Total |
|---|---|---|---|---|---|---|---|
| Marko | "Miki Mićo" by Lepa Brena | 5 | 8 | 6 | 6 | 5 | 30 |
| Igor | "I Kissed a Girl" by Katy Perry | 4 | 4 | 4 | 5 | 5 | 22 |
| Stela | "Caruso" by Luciano Pavarotti | 9 | 12 | 10 | 12 | 5 | 48 |
| Devin | "Another One Bites the Dust" by Queen | 10 | 10 | 12 | 10 | 0 | 42 |
| Marcela | "On the Floor" by Jennifer Lopez | 7 | 7 | 9 | 8 | 5 | 36 |
| Domagoj | "Miško moj" by Jole | 12 | 5 | 7 | 7 | 0 | 31 |
| Meri | "Nije mi svejedno" by Nina Badrić | 8 | 9 | 8 | 9 | 15 | 49 |
| Mada | "Dímelo" by Marc Anthony | 6 | 6 | 5 | 4 | 5 | 26 |

=== Week 8 (27 April) ===
The eighth episode premiered on 27 April 2025. The episode ended with a three-way tie between Marcela, Stela, and Domagoj. Due to having the most points by the jury, Stela was declared the winner. ToMa performed his song "Kriva procjena" with Meri Andraković who was dressed up as him.

| Contestant | Performance | Jury points | | | | Bonus points | Total |
| Contestant | Performance | Goran | Minea | Mario | Enis | Bonus points | Total |
|---|---|---|---|---|---|---|---|
| Igor | "Angels" by Robbie Williams | 9 | 8 | 10 | 12 | 0 | 39 |
| Stela | "Lean On" by MØ | 10 | 12 | 12 | 10 | 0 | 44 |
| Devin | "Jutro donosi kraj" by Vesna Pisarović | 6 | 5 | 5 | 5 | 0 | 21 |
| Marcela | "It's Not Unusual" by Tom Jones | 12 | 9 | 9 | 9 | 5 | 44 |
| Domagoj | "Il ballo del qua qua" by Romina Power | 7 | 10 | 6 | 6 | 15 | 44 |
| Meri | "Kriva procjena" by ToMa | 5 | 6 | 7 | 8 | 5 | 31 |
| Mada | "Zašto praviš slona od mene" by Dino Dvornik | 8 | 7 | 8 | 7 | 10 | 40 |

=== Week 9 (4 May) ===
The ninth episode premiered on 4 May 2025. Domagoj Nižić won this episode performing as Elvis Presley.

| Contestant | Performance | Jury points | | | | Bonus points | Total |
| Contestant | Performance | Goran | Minea | Mario | Enis | Bonus points | Total |
|---|---|---|---|---|---|---|---|
| Igor | "Sve bih dala da znam" by ET | 6 | 7 | 7 | 10 | 0 | 30 |
| Stela | "Raise Your Glass" by Pink | 12 | 9 | 9 | 8 | 0 | 38 |
| Devin | "Marijana" by Milo Hrnić | 7 | 12 | 10 | 12 | 0 | 41 |
| Marcela | "Singin' That Rock 'n' Roll" by Zorica Kondža | 5 | 6 | 6 | 6 | 0 | 23 |
| Domagoj | "Viva Las Vegas" by Elvis Presley | 8 | 5 | 5 | 7 | 30 | 55 |
| Meri | "Lovac i košuta" by Plavi Orkestar | 10 | 10 | 12 | 9 | 5 | 46 |
| Mada | "Dudu" by Tarkan | 9 | 8 | 8 | 5 | 0 | 30 |

=== Week 10 (11 May) ===
The tenth episode premiered on 11 May 2025. Marcela Oroši won this episode performing as Vesna Zmijanac.

| Contestant | Performance | Jury points | | | | Bonus points | Total |
| Contestant | Performance | Goran | Minea | Mario | Enis | Bonus points | Total |
|---|---|---|---|---|---|---|---|
| Igor | "Bamboléo" by Gipsy Kings | 10 | 9 | 10 | 8 | 10 | 47 |
| Stela | "I'd Do Anything for Love" by Meat Loaf | 9 | 10 | 9 | 9 | 5 | 42 |
| Devin | "El Diablo" by Elena Tsagrinou | 12 | 12 | 12 | 10 | 0 | 46 |
| Marcela | "Kazni me" by Vesna Zmijanac | 8 | 7 | 8 | 12 | 20 | 55 |
| Domagoj | "Kupit ću nam sat" by Željko Bebek | 6 | 6 | 6 | 6 | 0 | 24 |
| Meri | "Pleši sa mnom" by Danijela Martinović | 7 | 8 | 7 | 7 | 0 | 29 |
| Mada | "Nisi ti više crno vino" by Dalibor Brun | 5 | 5 | 5 | 5 | 0 | 20 |

=== Week 11 (19 May) ===
Due to the 2025 Croatian local elections held on 18 May 2025, the eleventh episode was rescheduled from its usual Sunday timeslot and instead premiered on Monday, 19 May. Stela Rade won this episode performing as Hanka Paldum.

| Contestant | Performance | Jury points | | | | Bonus points | Total |
| Contestant | Performance | Goran | Minea | Mario | Enis | Bonus points | Total |
|---|---|---|---|---|---|---|---|
| Igor | "La Foule" by Édith Piaf | 9 | 6 | 6 | 7 | 0 | 28 |
| Stela | "Ja te pjesmom zovem" by Hanka Paldum | 10 | 10 | 10 | 12 | 10 | 52 |
| Devin | "Due vite" by Marco Mengoni | 12 | 12 | 12 | 10 | 5 | 51 |
| Marcela | "Ja nisam kockar" by Vlado Kalember | 6 | 9 | 7 | 8 | 0 | 30 |
| Domagoj | "Maslačak" by Andrea Šušnjara | 5 | 5 | 5 | 5 | 0 | 20 |
| Meri | "Rebel Yell" by Billy Idol | 8 | 8 | 9 | 9 | 10 | 44 |
| Mada | "Šumica" by Ivana Banfić | 7 | 7 | 8 | 6 | 10 | 38 |

=== Week 12 (25 May) ===
The twelfth episode premiered on 25 May 2025. Meri Andraković won this episode performing as ABBA.

| Contestant | Performance | Jury points | | | | Bonus points | Total |
| Contestant | Performance | Goran | Minea | Mario | Enis | Bonus points | Total |
|---|---|---|---|---|---|---|---|
| Igor | "I'm Not Here to Make Friends" by Sam Smith | 6 | 6 | 7 | 6 | 0 | 25 |
| Stela | "Rano, ranije" by Magazin | 5 | 7 | 9 | 5 | 5 | 31 |
| Devin | "Levitating" by Dua Lipa | 9 | 5 | 6 | 8 | 5 | 33 |
| Marcela | "Ja bez tebe ne mogu da živim" by Halid Bešlić | 8 | 9 | 8 | 10 | 5 | 40 |
| Domagoj | "Put ka sreći" by Goran Bare | 12 | 10 | 10 | 9 | 5 | 46 |
| Meri | "The Winner Takes It All" by ABBA | 10 | 12 | 12 | 12 | 5 | 51 |
| Mada | "Europapa" by Joost | 7 | 8 | 5 | 7 | 10 | 37 |

=== Week 13 (1 June) ===
The thirteenth and the final episode of the season is scheduled to premiere on 1 June 2025. The finalists of the season, those contestants who accumulated the highest number of points over the course of the season, were Stela Rade, Igor Cukrov, Devin Juraj, and Marcela Oroši. Alen Bičević, the winner of previous season, joined Meri Andraković, performing as Lepa Brena, to complete one duo, while Mada Peršić and Domagoj Nižić were another duo. All contestants performed the song Euphoria by Loreen.

The finalists' points were converted to a scale from 7 to 4 points, starting with the finalist who had received the highest number of points during the season. The jury awarded points ranging from 8 to 12, while the contestants also awarded 5 points to one another.

Stela Rade, who performed at the finale as Christina Aguilera, accumulated the most points and won the season.

| Contestant | Performance | Jury points | | | | Starting points | Bonus points | Total |
| Contestant | Performance | Goran | Minea | Mario | Enis | Starting points | Bonus points | Total |
|---|---|---|---|---|---|---|---|---|
| Igor | "Con te partiro" by Andrea Bocelli | 9 | 8 | 10 | 9 | 6 | 5 | 47 |
| Stela | "Hurt" by Christina Aguilera | 10 | 10 | 12 | 12 | 7 | 10 | 61 |
| Devin | "Stotinama godina" by Jacques Houdek | 8 | 12 | 9 | 8 | 5 | 5 | 47 |
| Marcela | "Lose Control" by Teddy Swims | 12 | 9 | 8 | 10 | 4 | 15 | 58 |
| Domagoj | "Je, bo'me, je" by Nives Celzijus | — | | | | | | |
| Mada | "Je, bo'me, je" by Prima band | — | | | | | | |
| Meri | "Jedan dan života" by Miroslav Ilić | — | | | | | | |

== Reception ==
The first episode of the season, broadcast on 9 March 2025, was watched by an average of 600,000 viewers.
