= Tvoje lice zvuči poznato (Croatian TV series) =

- Also known as: TLZP
- Genre: Reality television
- Based on: Tu cara me suena by Gestmusic
- Presented by: Igor Mešin; Filip Detelić
- Judges: Goran Navojec; Martina Stjepanović Meter; Mario Roth; Enis Bešlagić
- Country of origin: Croatia
- Original language: Croatian
- No. of seasons: 10
- No. of episodes: 126 (list of episodes)

Production
- Running time: 180 minutes
- Production companies: Emotion Production; Absolutely Independent

Original release
- Network: Nova TV
- Release: 5 October 2014 – present

Tvoje lice zvuči poznato is a Croatian singing reality competition television series. It is the Croatian iteration of the Your Face Sounds Familiar franchise. The series features various celebrities dressing up and performing as notable singers in order to earn the title of the winner.

The series debuted on 5 October 2014 on Nova TV. Nine season were broadcast so far. As of 2026, the show is hosted by Igor Mešin and Filip Detelić, and judged by Martina Stjepanović Meter, Goran Navojec, Mario Roth, and Enis Bešlagić.

In 2021, the seventh season of the series aired as Tvoje lice zvuči poznato: All Stars, and featured the return of the contestants from the first six seasons.

== Format ==
The show challenges various celebrities (mostly singers and actors) to perform as a different iconic music artists every week, which is chosen by the show's "Randomiser." The 'Randomiser' can choose any older or younger artist available in the machine, or even a singer of the opposite sex, as well as a deceased singer. Before the celebrities perform, their preparation process for the performance is shown. After their performance, the contestants are critiques by the panel of judges.

The contestants are awarded points from the judges, as well as from each other, based on their performances. The judges give points from 4 to 12, with the exception of 11. After that, each contestant awards 5 points to a fellow contestant of their choice (known as "Bonus" points). In the semi-final week, four contestants with the highest number of votes qualify to the final. In the grand final, previous points are transformed into 4-7 system;the judges award points from 8 to 12, and contestants award 5 points to a fellow contestant of their choice. The winner of each episode wins 10 000 HRK, and the winner of the season wins 40 000 HRK. All money goes to charity of winner's own choice. A season usually lasts 13 weeks.

In the third episode of the third season, jokers were introduced. The celebrities had ability to use their joker once per season when they didn't like what the Randomiser had chosen for them to perform, or if they thought the task is too difficult. They could choose another contestant to perform instead of them. It was announced that the show will get even more new content in the fourth season, but the 'Joker' ability was removed. The new feature in the fourth season was the introduction of holographic performances. If the "Randomiser" chooses a celebrity should perform a duet, they can do it using the pre-recorded hologram for one of the given singers.

== Presenters and judges ==
Color key

Host
Main judge
Guest judge
Contestant

Presenters and main judges on Tvoje lice zvuči poznato
Judge	Season									
Judge	1	2	3	4	5	6	7	8	9	10
Igor Mešin	●	●	●	●	●	●	●	●	●	●
Rene Bitorajac	●	●	●	●	●					
Frano Ridjan						●	●			
Maja Šuput		●	●			●	●		●	
Filip Detelić								●	●	●
Goran Navojec	●		●	●		●	●	●	●	●
Sandra Bagarić	●	●	●	●						
Tomo in der Mühlen	●	●	●	●						
Branko Đurić		●								
Nives Celzijus	●				●	●	●			
Damir Kedžo				●	●					
Mario Petreković	●		●	●	●					
Saša Lozar			●		●					
Indira Levak	●		●	●		●	●			
Minea	●	●						●	●	
Mario Roth				●				●	●	●
Enis Bešlagić	●							●	●	●
Martina Stjepanović Meter										●

=== Guest judges ===
The first four seasons featured three main judges, and a fourth guest judge that varied from episode to episode.

Guest judges on Tvoje lice zvuči poznato
Episode	Season 1	Season 2	Season 3	Season 4
1	Mislav Čavajda	Mario Petreković	Saša Lozar	Damir Kedžo
2	Joško Čagalj Jole	Mila Elegović	Ecija Ojdanić	Jelena Rozga
3	Boris Đurđević	Davor Gobac	Maja Šuput	Bojana Gregorić Vejzović
4	Nina Badrić	Miran Kurspahić	Indira Levak	Jacques Houdek
5	Enis Bešlagić	Minea	Ivan Šarić	Lana Jurčević
6	Indira Levak	Matija Vuica	Danijela Martinović	Baby Dooks
7	Emilija Kokić	Ivana Banfić	Andrea Andrassy	Mia Kovačić
8	Jelena Rozga	Giuliano	Nives Ivanković	Zorica Kondža
9	Luka Nižetić	Igor Barberić	Ivana Marić	Matteo Cetinski
10	Tonči Huljić	Mia Kovačić	Alka Vuica	Ivanka Mazurkijević
11	Nives Celsius	Baby Dooks	Ivan Zak	Marko Tolja
12	Severina Vučković	Danijela Martinović	Mario Petreković	Irina Čulinović
13	No episode 13		Petar Grašo	Indira Levak & Mario Petreković

== Series overview ==
Season	Stars	Episodes	Originally released		Winner	Runner-up
Season	Stars	Episodes	First released	Last released	Winner	Runner-up
1	8	12	5 October 2014	21 December 2014	Mario Petreković	Vanda Winter
2	8	12	13 September 2015	6 December 2015	Saša Lozar	Luka Bulić
3	8	13	25 September 2016	18 December 2016	Damir Kedžo	Ana Maras Harmander
4	8	13	5 March 2017	28 May 2017	Nives Celzijus	Bojan Jambrošić
5	8	13	18 March 2018	10 June 2018	Maja Bajamić	Katarina Baban
6	8	16	8 March 2020	27 December 2020	Fabijan Pavao Medvešek	Marko Braić
7	8	8	25 April 2021	13 June 2021	Saša Lozar	Maja Bajamić
8	8	13	3 March 2024	26 May 2024	Alen Bičević	Antonia Dora Pleško
9	8	13	9 March 2025	1 June 2025	Stela Rade	Marcela Oroši
10	8	13	8 March 2026	31 May 2026	Sven Pocrnić	TBA

=== Season 1 (2014) ===
The series debuted on 5 October 2014 on Nova TV. The eight celebrity contestants were Mario Petreković, Vanda Winter, Renata Končić Minea, Ronald Braus, Andrea Andrassy, Jasna Palić Picukarić, Giuliano, and Baby Dooks. The season was won by Mario Petrković.

=== Season 2 (2015) ===
The second season premiered on 13 September 2015. The celebrity contestants were Luka Bulić, Saša Lozar, Maja Posavec, Ivana Marić, Maja Šuput, Renata Sabljak, Dušan Bućan, and Ivan Šarić. The season was won by Saša Lozar.

=== Season 3 (2016) ===
The third season premiered on 25 September 2016. The contestants were Damir Kedžo, Hana Hegedušić, Lana Jurčević, Filip Dizdar, Matteo Cetinski, Žanamari Perčić, Fil Tilen, and Ana Maras Harmander. The season was won by Damir Kedžo.

=== Season 4 (2017) ===
The fourth season premiered on 5 March 2017. The contestants were Nives Celzijus, Ana Gruica, Mia Anočić Valentić, Ivana Mišerić, Dalibor Petko, Bojan Jambrošić, Mario Roth, and Daniel Bilić. Nives Celzijus was the winner of the fourth season.

=== Season 5 (2018) ===
The fifth season premiered on 18 March 2018. The contestants were Davor Dretar Drele, Maja Bajamić, Matko Knešaurek, Katarina Baban, Damir Poljičak, Ana Vilenica, Amel Ćurić, and Paola Valić Bekić. The winner was Maja Bajamić.

=== Season 6 (2020) ===
The sixth season premiered on 8 March 2020. The contestants were Lu Jakelić, Pavao Fabijan Medvešek, Lana Klingor Mihić, Marina Orsag, Marko Braić, Neda Parmać, Mario Valentić, and Siniša Ružić. After the second episode aired on 15 March, Nova TV suspended the production of the season due to the COVID-19 pandemic. The season resumed with its third episode on 27 September 2020. The season was won by Fabijan Pavao Medvešek.

=== Season 7: All Stars (2021) ===
The seventh season of the series served as its first All Stars edition, featuring the return of previous contestants: Mario Petreković, Saša Lozar, Damir Kedžo, Dalibor Petko, Ivana Mišerić, Mario Roth, Katarina Baban, and Maja Bajamić. The season ran from 21 April to 13 June 2021, and was won by Saša Lozar.

=== Season 8 (2024) ===
The eighth season premiered on 3 March 2024. The contestants were Antonija Šola, Mia Negovetić, ToMa, Marija Kolb, Alen Bičević, Antonia Dora Pleško, Luciano Plazibat, and Faris Pinjo. The winner was Alen Bičević.

=== Season 9 (2025) ===
In November 2024, Nova TV confirmed that a ninth season is in the works. On 11 February 2025, Igor Mešin and Filip Detelić were confirmed to return as the hosts. The eight contestants were revealed on 24 February 2025: Mada Peršić, Marcela Oroši, Devin Juraj, Marko Bošnjak, Stela Rade, Igor Cukrov, Domagoj Nižić and Meri Andraković. The season premiered on 9 March 2025 and was won by Stela Rade.

=== Season 10 (2026) ===
The tenth season premiered on 8 March 2026. Martina Stjepanović Meter replaced Minea on the judging panel. The season was won by Sven Pocrnić.
