= Vanna discography =

- Studio albums: 7
- Live albums: 4
- Compilation albums: 3
- Singles: 46
- Music videos: 33

Croatian singer-songwriter Vanna has released seven studio albums, four live albums, three compilation albums, and 45 singles. From 1991 to 1998 she was the lead vocalist of the Croatian eurodance band Electro Team. With the group, she released three studio albums before starting her solo career in 1998. Vanna's debut studio album, I to sam ja, was released in early 1997 while she was still in the group. The album spawned two singles, "You Must Love Me" and "Crazy", and included mostly cover songs.

Released in 1998, Vanna's second studio album Ispod istog neba included newly written songs. The album had three singles, one of which, "Ja ću budna sanjati", featured Croatian pop singer Gibonni. 24 sata, her third studio album, was released in 2000 through Croatia Records. It currently remains her most successful album to date. Aided by the commercial successes of its hit singles "Daj mi jedan dobar razlog", "Ti se varaš", "Kao rijeka", "Ako je vrijedilo išta" and "24 sata".

In 2001, she participated at Dora 2001, the selection show to choose Croatia's representative at the Eurovision Song Contest 2001, with the song "Strune Ljubavi". She won the contest and earned the right to represent Croatia at the 2001 Eurovision Song Contest with an English language version titled "Strings of My Heart". Vanna released her fourth studio album, Hrabra kao prije, in 2003. The album spawned the hit single "Kao da me nema". In 2007, she released her fifth studio album Ledeno doba which was her first album released after the introduction of the Croatian albums chart, where it peaked at number five. Her sixth studio album, Sjaj, released in 2011 peaked at number three in Croatia and spawned two hit singles, "Ljubav putuje pod lažnim imenom" and the title track.

Vanna's seventh studio album Izmiješane boje was released in 2019 and peaked at number one in Croatia. To this day, it is the artist's only number one album in her home country. The album included most of her singles released from 2013 to 2019.

== Albums ==
=== Studio albums ===
Title	Details	Peak chart positions
Title	Details	CRO
I to sam ja	Released: 1997; Formats: Cassette, CD, digital download, streaming; Label: Croatia Records	(Note: Top of the Shops was launched in 2002 but a partial archive is only available from 2006 onwards.)
Ispod istog neba	Released: 1998; Formats: CD, digital download, streaming; Label: Croatia Records	(Note: Top of the Shops was launched in 2002 but a partial archive is only available from 2006 onwards.)
24 sata	Released: 2000; Formats: CD, digital download, streaming; Label: Croatia Records	(Note: Top of the Shops was launched in 2002 but a partial archive is only available from 2006 onwards.)
Hrabra kao prije	Released: 2003; Formats: CD, digital download, streaming; Label: Croatia Records	(Note: Top of the Shops was launched in 2002 but a partial archive is only available from 2006 onwards.)
Ledeno doba	Released: 2007; Formats: CD, DVD, digital download, streaming; Label: Croatia Records	5
Sjaj	Released: 2010; Formats: CD, digital download, streaming; Label: Croatia Records	2
Izmiješane boje	Released: 24 July 2019; Formats: CD, LP, digital download, streaming; Label: Croatia Records	1

=== Live albums ===
Title	Details	Peak chart positions
Title	Details	CRO
U Lisinskom	Released: 2001; Formats: Cassette, CD, digital download, streaming; Label: Croatia Records	(Note: Top of the Shops was launched in 2002 but a partial archive is only available from 2006 onwards.)
S prijateljima u Lisinskom	Released: 2005; Formats: CD, DVD, digital download, streaming; Label: Croatia Records	(Note: Top of the Shops was launched in 2002 but a partial archive is only available from 2006 onwards.)
Ispuni mi želju	Released: 19 July 2016; Formats: CD, DVD, digital download, streaming; Label: Croatia Records	—
Live @ Arena	Released: 2 December 2022; Formats: CD, digital download, streaming; Label: Croatia Records	2

=== Compilation albums ===
Title	Details	Peak chart positions
Title	Details	CRO
The Platinum Collection	Released: 2008; Formats: CD, digital download, streaming; Label: Croatia Records	—
Najljepše ljubavne pjesme	Released: 2010; Formats: CD, digital download, streaming; Label: Croatia Records	—
Zajedno 20 godina	Released: 2 April 2021; Formats: CD, digital download, streaming; Label: Croatia Records	—

== Singles ==
Title	Year	Peak chart positions	Album
Title	Year	CRO	Album
"Sea of Love"	1994	(Note: HR Top 40 was launched on 24 January 2013.)	Non-album single
"You Must Love Me"	1997	(Note: HR Top 40 was launched on 24 January 2013.)	I to sam ja
"Crazy"	1997	(Note: HR Top 40 was launched on 24 January 2013.)	I to sam ja
"Ja imam snage za to"	1998	(Note: HR Top 40 was launched on 24 January 2013.)	Ispod istog neba
"Ispod istog neba"	1998	(Note: HR Top 40 was launched on 24 January 2013.)	Ispod istog neba
"Ja ću budna sanjati" (with Gibonni)	1998	(Note: HR Top 40 was launched on 24 January 2013.)	Ispod istog neba
"Daj mi jedan dobar razlog"	1999	(Note: HR Top 40 was launched on 24 January 2013.)	24 sata
"Ti se varaš"	1999	(Note: HR Top 40 was launched on 24 January 2013.)	24 sata
"Kao rijeka"	2000	(Note: HR Top 40 was launched on 24 January 2013.)	24 sata
"Ako je vrijedilo išta"	2000	(Note: HR Top 40 was launched on 24 January 2013.)	24 sata
"24 sata"	2000	(Note: HR Top 40 was launched on 24 January 2013.)	24 sata
"Strune ljubavi" / "Strings of My Heart"	2001	(Note: HR Top 40 was launched on 24 January 2013.)	Dora 2001
"Kao da me nema"	2003	(Note: HR Top 40 was launched on 24 January 2013.)	Hrabra kao prije
"Ne govori sve na glas"	2003	(Note: HR Top 40 was launched on 24 January 2013.)	Hrabra kao prije
"Hrabra kao prije"	2004	(Note: HR Top 40 was launched on 24 January 2013.)	Hrabra kao prije
"Napokon"	2004	(Note: HR Top 40 was launched on 24 January 2013.)	Hrabra kao prije
"Kupi mi"	2005	(Note: HR Top 40 was launched on 24 January 2013.)	S prijateljima u Lisinskom
"Baš kao ti i ja" (with Oliver Dragojević)	2007	(Note: HR Top 40 was launched on 24 January 2013.)	Ledeno doba
"Na otkucaj"	2007	(Note: HR Top 40 was launched on 24 January 2013.)	Ledeno doba
"Početak i kraj"	2007	(Note: HR Top 40 was launched on 24 January 2013.)	Ledeno doba
"Stranica dnevnika"	2008	(Note: HR Top 40 was launched on 24 January 2013.)	Ledeno doba
"Ivana"	2008	(Note: HR Top 40 was launched on 24 January 2013.)	Ledeno doba
"Ljubav putuje pod lažnim imenom"	2010	(Note: HR Top 40 was launched on 24 January 2013.)	Sjaj
"Sjaj"	2011	(Note: HR Top 40 was launched on 24 January 2013.)	Sjaj
"7 minuta" (with Mario Huljev)	2011	(Note: HR Top 40 was launched on 24 January 2013.)	Sjaj
"Svakodnevna žena"	2011	(Note: HR Top 40 was launched on 24 January 2013.)	Sjaj
"1000 milja"	2013	2	Non-album single
"Kad prijatelja gubim"	2014	20	Non-album single
"Lopov"	2014	5	Izmiješane boje
"Probaj"	2015	1	Izmiješane boje
"Suze na kiši"	2016	1	Non-album single
"Zajedno" (with Buđenje)	2016	6	Brudet
"Izmiješane boje"	2017	5	Izmiješane boje
"Tragom tvojih tragova" (with Zsa Zsa)	2017	3	Izmiješane boje
"Najbolji ljudi"	2018	3	Izmiješane boje
"Gdje počinje kraj"	2018	15	Izmiješane boje
"U tebi"	2019	1	Izmiješane boje
"Ako je vrijedilo išta" (with The Frajle)	2019	9	Non-album single
"Kad smo se voljeli"	2019	3	Izmiješane boje
"Loš trenutak"	2020	7	Izmiješane boje
"Junaci"	2020	2	Non-album single
"Puna memorija"	2020	3	Non-album single
"Pjesma o tebi"	2021	1	Non-album single
"Ovo je ljubav" (with Kameny)	2021	2	Album
"Želja"	2022	3	Non-album single
"Kriva nota"	2023	3	Non-album single
"Navika"	2023	2	Non-album single
"—" denotes a recording that did not chart or were not released.

== Music videos ==
Title	Year	Director(s)	Ref.
As lead artist
"You Must Love Me"	1997	—	
"Crazy"	1997	—	
"Ja imam snage za to"	1998	—	
"Ispod istog neba"	1998	Ivan Vrdoljak	
"Ja ću budna sanjati" (with Gibonni)	1998	Gonzo	
"Daj mi jedan dobar razlog"	1999	Andrija Vrdoljak	
"Ti se varaš"	1999	—	
"Kao da me nema"	2003	Andrija Vrdoljak	
"Hrabra kao prije"	2004	—	
"Napokon"	2004	Andrija Vrdoljak	
"Baš kao ti i ja" (with Oliver Dragojević)	2007	Andrija Vrdoljak	
"Na otkucaj"	2007	Andrija Vrdoljak	
"Početak i kraj"	2007	Andrija Vrdoljak	
"Stranica dnevnika"	2008	Andrija Vrdoljak	
"Ivana"	2008	Andrija Vrdoljak	
"Ljubav putuje pod lažnim imenom"	2010	—	
"Sjaj"	2011	—	
"1000 milja"	2013	Filip Dizdar	
"Lopov"	2014	Andrija Vrdoljak	
"Probaj"	2015	Dino Senčar	
"Suze na kiši"	2016	Dino Senčar	
"Izmiješane boje"	2017	Matea Smolčić	
"Tragom tvojih tragova" (with Zsa Zsa)	2017	Nevio Smajić	
"Gdje počinje kraj"	2018	Nevio Smajić	
"Najbolji ljudi"	2018	Dino Senčar, Danijel Kovačević	
"U tebi"	2019	Dino Senčar, Danijel Kovačević	
"Kad smo se voljeli"	2019	Dario Lepoglavec	
"Loš trenutak"	2020	Dario Lepoglavec	
"Junaci"	2020	Nevio Smajić	
"Puna memorija"	2020	Dario Lepoglavec	
"Želja"	2022	Dario Lepoglavec	
"Kriva nota"	2023	Dario Lepoglavec	
"Navika"	2023	Tina Kadoić	
As featured artist
"Zajedno" (with Buđenje)	2016	Tomislav Pović	
"Ovo je ljubav" (with Kameny)	2021	Josip Grizbaher	
