= Hrvatska traži zvijezdu season 3 =

Hrvatska traži zvijezdu
- Season 3
- Hosted by: Ivan Šarić; Ecija Ivušić
- Judges: Tony Cetinski, Ivana Mišerić, Goran Lisica-Fox

Release
- Original network: RTL Televizija
- Original release: 3 March 2011

Hrvatska traži zvijezdu season 3 (Croatian for "Croatia is searching for a Star") was the third season of the second Croatian version of Pop Idol. It was previously on air.

Auditions were held in the four biggest cities of the country: Zagreb, Rijeka, Osijek and Split. Tony Cetinski and Goran Lisica returned as judges while Anđa Marić was replaced by Ivana Mišerić, a radio DJ.

== Top 15 - Current hits ==
Original Airdate: April 22, 2011

Contestant	Song (Artist)	Verdict
Ana Mandura	Release me (Agnes)	Out
Daniel Dizdar	Forget You (Cee Lo Green)	
Frane Brajković	Prayin' (Plan B)	Out
Goran Kos	You Found Me (The Fray)	
Ines Huskić	Do It Like a Dude (Jessie J)	
Ivan Delić	Use Somebody (Kings Of Leon)	
Katarina Đuderija	Well Well Well (Duffy)	Out
Kristian Marolt	DJ Got Us Fallin' In Love (Usher feat. Pitbull)	
Maja Bajamić	Empire State of Mind (Jay-Z feat. Alicia Keys)	
Marcela Oroši	Monday Morning (Melanie Fiona)	
Mark Marku	Grenade (Bruno Mars)	
Milijana Mijatović	Make Me Wanna Die (Pretty Reckless)	Out
Romana Pavliša	Born This Way (Lady Gaga)	
Taher Sanuri	Whataya Want from Me (Adam Lambert)	
Valentina Trstenjak	Only Girl (In the World) (Rihanna)	Out

== Top 10 - Croatian 90's hits ==
Original Airdate: April 29, 2011

Contestant	Song (Artist)	Verdict
Daniel Dizdar	Nebo (Sandi Cenov)	Btm 3
Goran Kos	Ljubio sam anđela (Neno Belan)	
Ines Huskić	Novi svijet koji dolazi (Annamaria)	Btm 2
Ivan Delić	Ramona (Psihomodo pop)	
Kristian Marolt	Kad nema ljubavi (Ilan Kabiljo)	Out
Maja Bajamić	Nisi me bio vrijedan ti (Mandi)	
Marcela Oroši	Moj mali je opasan (Tajči)	
Mark Marku	Ja bih preživio (Dino Dvornik)	
Romana Pavliša	Sve bih dala da znam (Vanna)	
Taher Sanuri	Prah i pepeo (Tony Cetinski)	Btm 4

== Top 9 - Famous singers ==
Original Airdate: May 6, 2011

Contestant	Song (Artist)	Verdict
Daniel Dizdar	Rock DJ (Robbie Williams)	Btm 3
Goran Kos	Elevation (U2)	
Ines Huskić	Why Don't You Love Me (Beyoncé)	
Ivan Delić	Beat It (Michael Jackson)	
Maja Bajamić	Fighter (Christina Aguilera)	
Marcela Oroši	Funhouse (Pink)	Btm 2
Mark Marku	Faith (George Michael)	
Romana Pavliša	Vogue (Madonna)	Out
Taher Sanuri	I Want It All (Queen)	
