= Bešlagić =

Bešlagić is a Bosniak surname. Notable people with the surname include:

- Enis Bešlagić (born 1975), actor and TV personality
- Rešad Bešlagić (1912–1945), folk singer
- Selim Bešlagić (born 1942), Bosnian politician
- Šefik Bešlagić (1908–1999), cultural historian
