= Mia Negovetić =

Croatian singer-songwriter and voice actress

- Born: Mia Negovetić; 5 October 2002 (age 24); Rijeka, Croatia
- Genre: Pop
- Occupations: Singer; songwriter; voice actress
- Instruments: Vocals; piano
- Years active: 2015–present
- Label: Croatia Records

Mia Negovetić (born 5 October 2002) is a Croatian singer-songwriter and voice actress. She is known for winning season one of RTL Televizija's Zvjezdice.

== Career ==
Negovetić auditioned for the first series of RTL Televizija's Zvjezdice in 2015, singing "Listen" by Beyoncé for judges Enis Bešlagić, Luka Nižetić, Zdravko Šljivac, Vanna and Alka Vuica. She won the competition on 31 October 2015 by receiving the highest number of cast televotes in the finals. Over two months earlier on 4 August, at the 20th anniversary commemoration of Operation Storm, Negovetić performed the Croatian national anthem "Lijepa naša domovino" (Our Beautiful Homeland), accompanied by the Croatian Armed Forces Band.

In early 2016 she appeared on NBC's television series Little Big Shots where she performed her rendition of Beyoncé's "Listen". Since 2016 Negovetić has released several solo singles, including "Trouble" and "Vrijeme je" (It's Time) and headlined multiple concerts at the Vatroslav Lisinski Concert Hall in Zagreb.

On 23 December 2019, Negovetić was announced as one of the sixteen participants in Dora 2020, the national contest in Croatia to select the country's Eurovision Song Contest 2020 entry, with the song "When it Comes to You". At the close of voting, the song had received 31 points, placing second in a field of 16. It tied for first place but the tie-break rules awarded the win to Damir Kedžo.

In January 2020, Negovetić signed a recording contract with Croatia Records. In December 2020, Negovetić was announced as one of the fourteen finalists for Dora 2021. She performed the song "She's Like a Dream" which she had co-written together with Linnea Deb, Denniz Jamm, Denise Kertes. She placed third with a total of 119 points. On 25 February 2021, Negovetić was nominated for the Best New Artist Award at the 2021 edition of the Porin Awards; however, she lost it to Albina Grčić.

The following year, on 17 December 2021, Negovetić was announced as one of the fourteen acts to perform at Dora 2022 with the song "Forgive Me (Oprosti)".

As a voice actress, she dubbed the title character in Moana and Mirabel Madrigal in Encanto.

In 2024, she participated in Tvoje lice zvuči poznato.

== Discography ==
=== Singles ===
| Title | Year | Peak chart positions | Album |
| Title | Year | CRO | Album |
|---|---|---|---|
| "Trouble" | 2018 | — | Non-album singles |
| "Runnin' Away" | 2018 | — | Non-album singles |
| "Little Love" | 2018 | — | Non-album singles |
| "Vrijeme je" | 2019 | — | Non-album singles |
| "Na pola puta do svemira" | 2020 | — (Note: "Na pola puta do svemira" did not enter the HR Top 40, but peaked at number 89 on the regional HR Top 100 (Dalmacija) chart.) | Non-album singles |
| "When it Comes to You" | 2020 | 6 | Non-album singles |
| "Pusti" | 2020 | 14 | Non-album singles |
| "Ljubav nema kraj" (with Edi Abazi) | 2021 | 9 | Non-album singles |
| "She's Like a Dream" | 2021 | 28 | Non-album singles |
| "Ja ti priznajem" | 2021 | 12 | Non-album singles |
| "Forgive Me (Oprosti)" | 2022 | 20 | Non-album singles |
| "Mijenjam se" | 2022 | 13 | Non-album singles |
"—" denotes releases that did not chart or were not released in that territory.

== Awards and nominations ==
| Year | Association | Category | Nominee / work | Result | Ref. |
|---|---|---|---|---|---|
| 2021 | Porin | Best New Artist | Herself | Nominated | |
