= Victory Day (Croatia) =

Public holiday in Croatia

Victory and Homeland Thanksgiving Day and the Day of Croatian Defenders
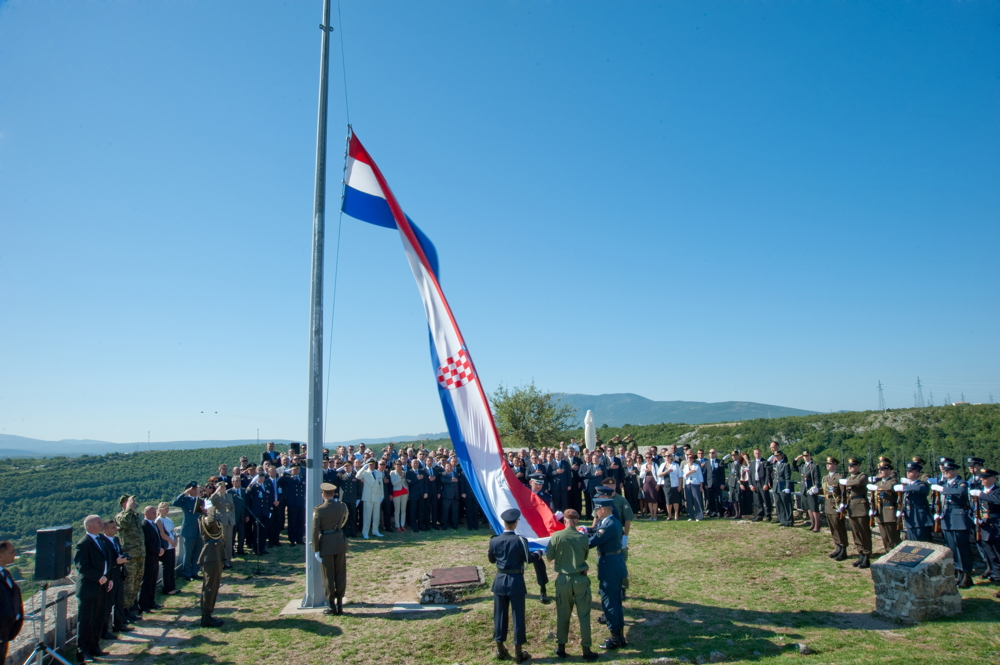
- Soldiers raising the Flag of Croatia on Knin Fortress, 5 August 2011
- Official name: Dan pobjede i domovinske zahvalnosti i Dan hrvatskih branitelja
- Also called: Victory Day
- Observed by: Croatia
- Significance: Operation Storm
- Celebrations: Military parade, flag raising, mass, concerts
- Date: 5 August
- Next time: 5 August 2027
- Frequency: Annual

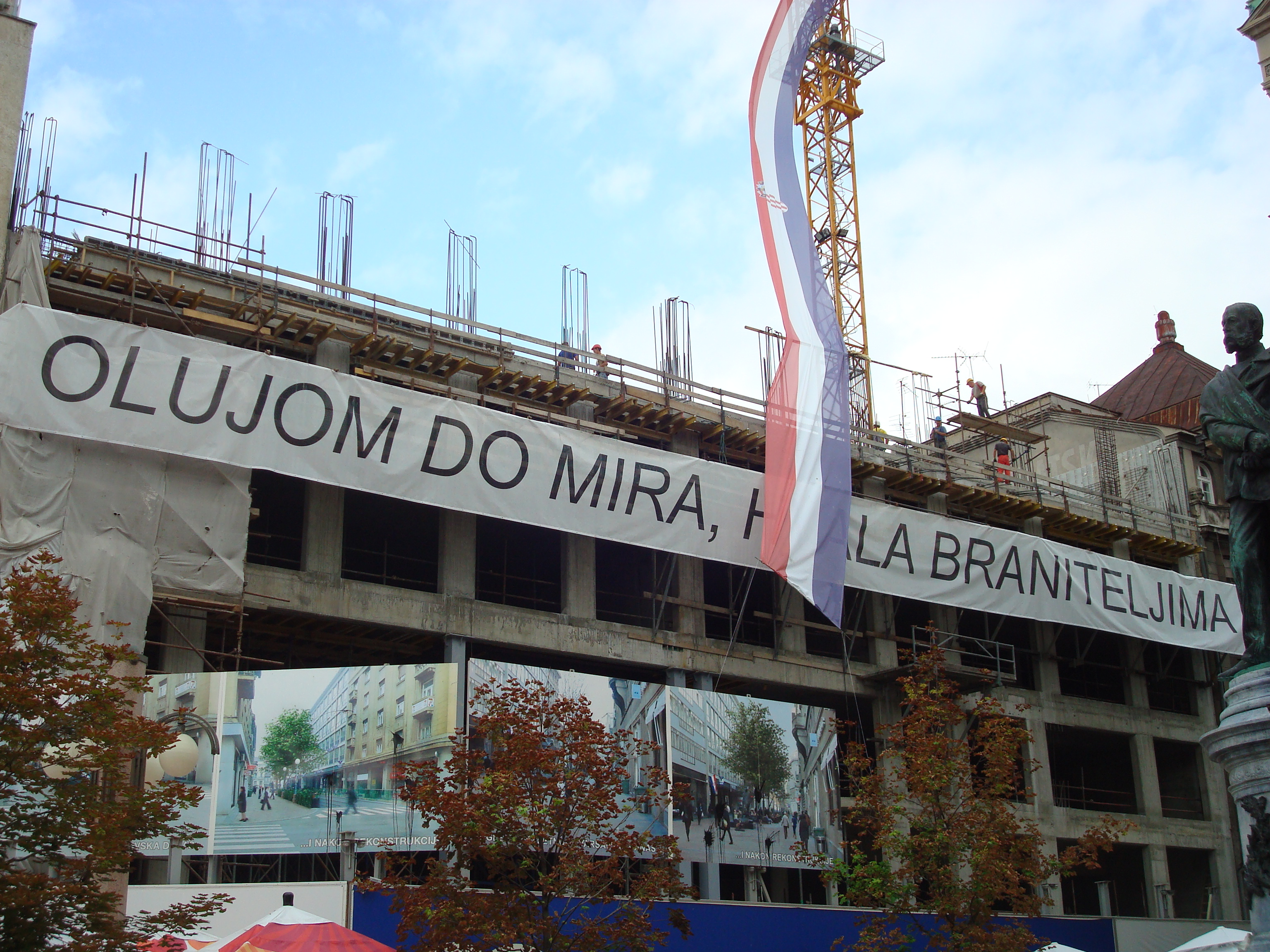
A banner marking Victory Day on a construction site in Zagreb, 2010

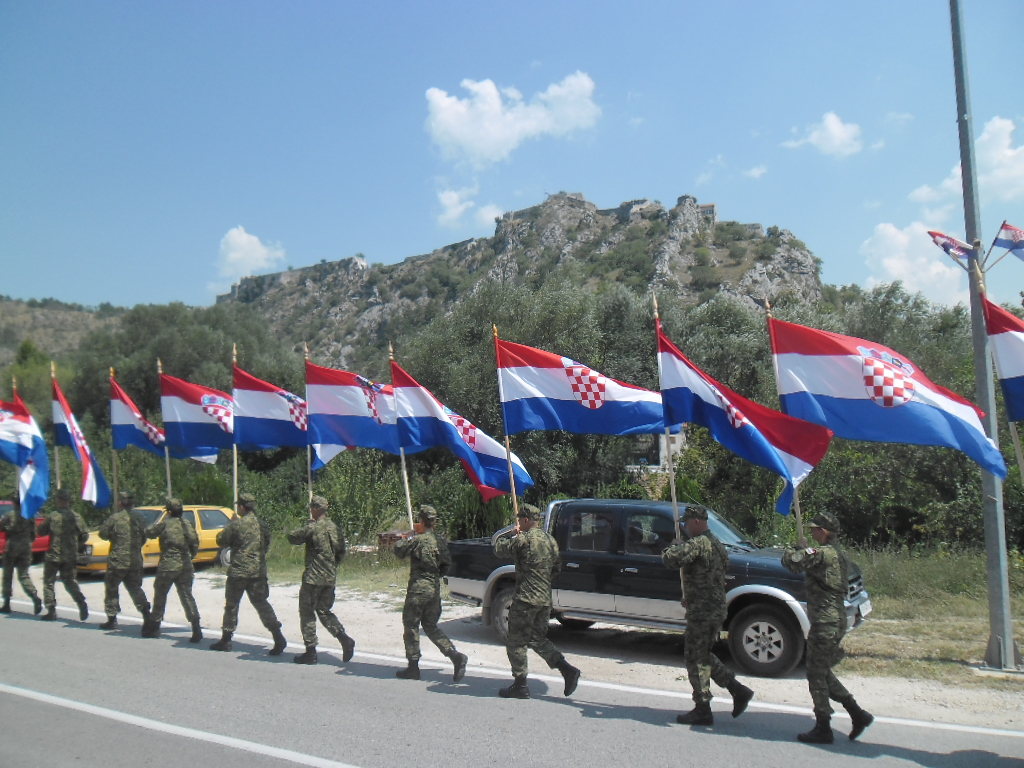
Victory Day flag parade in Knin, 2015

Victory and Homeland Thanksgiving Day and the Day of Croatian Defenders (Croatian: Dan pobjede i domovinske zahvalnosti i Dan hrvatskih branitelja), commonly shortened to Victory Day (Dan pobjede), is a public holiday in Croatia that is celebrated annually on 5 August, commemorating the Croatian War of Independence. On that date in 1995 the Croatian Army took the city of Knin during Operation Storm, which effectively brought an end to the proto-state of Republic of Serbian Krajina. In 2008, the Croatian Parliament also assigned the name Day of Croatian Defenders (Dan hrvatskih branitelja) to the holiday, which honors the current service members and veterans of the Armed Forces of Croatia.

== Celebrations ==
The main celebration is centered in Knin where there are festivities commemorating the event, beginning with a mass and laying of wreaths in honour of those who died in the war, and continuing with parades and concerts. The event is attended by thousands, including the country's leading politicians. The Flag of Croatia on Knin Fortress is ceremonially raised as part of the celebrations.

=== 2015 parade ===
A special military parade of the Armed Forces in honor of Victory Day was held on 4 August 2015 in Zagreb, celebrating the twentieth anniversary of Operation Storm. The parade was opened by the Honor Guard Battalion on the lawns of the National and University Library, with three MiG-21's flying over the city. "Lijepa naša domovino" was performed by the 12-year-old Mia Negovetić, accompanied by the Croatian Armed Forces Band and the Croatian Navy's vocal ensemble. It aroused great public interest considering that the last military parade in Croatia was organized in 1997. About 100,000 spectators attended the parade, additional sound systems wereity of Vukovar and Savska Streets. The editorial board of the Zagreb-based Jutarnji list, gave a positive review of the parade, demanding the introduction of regular parades for Victory Day. Military analyst Igor Tabak praised the event, while criticizing the inauthenticity of certain "historical units".

=== 2020 celebrations ===
On the silver jubilee in 2020, the celebrations were attended for the first time ever by an ethnic Serb political representative, Deputy Prime Minister Boris Milošević, a move which was applauded across the political spectrum, with Prime Minister Andrej Plenković among others stating that it will "send a new message for Croatian society". On top of this, Plenković, as well as President Zoran Milanović sent messages of peace to the people of Serbia. Opposition to the move from the Deputy Prime Minister came from members of the political far-right such as the Homeland Movement and the Croatian Defence Forces, as well as from politicians from Serbia and entity Republika Srpska from Bosnia and Herzegovina.

=== 2025 parade ===
A special military parade of the Armed Forces was held on 31 July 2025 in Zagreb, celebrating the thirtieth anniversary of Operation Storm. The parade was opened by the Honor Guard Battalion on the lawns of the National and University Library, with nine Rafales flying over the city. "Lijepa naša domovino" was performed by the Croatian Armed Forces Band and the Croatian Navy's vocal ensemble. It aroused great public interest considering that it was the biggest military parade in the nation's history. About 800,000 spectators watched the parade, additional sound systems were installed in the city of Vukovar and Savska Streets. Leopard 2A4s, FPV drones, Bayraktars and more marched through.

== See also ==
- Public holidays in Croatia
- Operation Storm
- Victory Day in other countries
