= Bruno Kovačić =

Croatian musician and composer (born 1967)

- Born: Bruno Kovačić; 29 January 1967 (age 58)
- Origin: Zagreb, Croatia, EU
- Genres: pop/rock
- Occupation(s): Singer-songwriter, instrumentalist, arranger
- Instrument(s): Singing, guitar/saxophone
- Years active: 1984–present
- Labels: Cantus

Bruno Kovačić is a Croatian musician and composer.

== Biography ==
His career began in the 1980s when he formed the band called D-Day. Afterwards, he worked with all the important musicians and singers in and around Croatia as a musician, composer or arranger. By the late 80s, he entered Parni valjak as a guitarist and saxophone player, then performed with Gibonni, Hard Time and Fanny Hill, and he recorded his album "Just Like All Other People" in 2001. He wrote songs for Oliver Dragojević, Ivan Mikulić, Tony Cetinski, Danijela, Vanna, Jacques Houdek, and for his wife Ivana Plechinger, with whom he wrote hit songs such as To nismo mi and Kao rijeka which scored second on Dora in 2000. Ivana and Bruno have two sons.

== Discography ==
=== Albums ===
- Just Like All Other People (2001)

=== Cooperation ===
- Vanna (Tako nježno tako lažno, Kao rijeka (written with Ivana Plechinger), Hrabra kao prije, Ljubi me za kraj, Sama, Kupi mi, Ledeno doba, Početak i kraj, Ivana, Da sve je ovo bilo jučer, Ponovo moj, Reci, Kome, Baš kao ti i ja)
- Oliver Dragojević (3 songs: Dišem, Ovaj put ne, Priča se, To nismo mi (written with Ivana Plechinger, performed with Divas))
- Tony Cetinski (1 song: Moje sve)
- Ivana Plechinger (most of the songs on her three albums)
- Jacques Houdek (2 songs: Ne vjerujem, Kao zrak)
- Ivan Mikulić (2 songs: Ej zoro, Jedina)
