= Oblak u službi zakona =

- Genre: Comedy
- Created by: Snježana Tribuson; Goran Tribuson
- Country of origin: Croatia
- Original language: Croatian
- No. of seasons: 3
- No. of episodes: 26 (list of episodes)

Original release
- Network: HRT 1
- Release: 9 January 2023 – 12 May 2025

Oblak u službi zakona ("Oblak in the Service of Law") is a Croatian comedy television series created by Snježana and Goran Tribuson. Produced by Interflim for HRT, the series debuted on HRT 1 on 9 January 2023. The second season premiered in March 2024, with the third season following in March 2025.

== Premise ==
The series is a combination of a family series with a light crime plot, as it follows Nikola, the head of the Oblak family, who is a police sergeant. He is an idealist and an honest man who believes in certain human values and often recognizes them even where they are not. Unlike Nikola, the other members of the Oblak family are far more realistic and prone to actions that, although benign, are on the verge of legality.

== Cast ==
- Ozren Grabarić as Nikola Oblak, a police officer
- Dijana Vidušin as Jagoda Oblak, Nikola's wife who is unemployed
- Toma Medvešek as Bruno Oblak, Nikola and Jagoda's son
- Borna Fadljević as Ratko Oblak, Nikola and Jagoda's younger son
- Zoran Čubrilo as Ludvig
- Goran Navojec as Suvi
- Igor Mešin as Požgaj, Nikola's colleague
- Željko Königsknecht as Božo
- Ksenija Marinković as Greta

== Episodes ==
Season	Episodes	Originally released	
Season	Episodes	First released	Last released
1	14	9 January 2023	21 February 2023
2	10	11 March 2024	9 April 2024
3	12	31 March 2025	12 May 2025
