= List of Oblak u službi zakona episodes =

Oblak u službi zakona is a Croatian comedy television series that premiered on 9 January 2023 on HRT 1. The series has spawned three seasons so far.

== Series overview ==
Season	Episodes	Originally released	
Season	Episodes	First released	Last released
1	14	9 January 2023	21 February 2023
2	10	11 March 2024	9 April 2024
3	12	31 March 2025	12 May 2025

== Episodes ==
=== Season 1 (2023) ===
No. overall	No. in season	Title	Original release date
1	1	"Karirana košulja"	9 January 2023
While Jagoda is preparing a cake and drinks to celebrate her birthday with her family, the Maša kiosk, which is right next to the police station, has been broken into. Preoccupied with the robbery and angry that Bruno is constantly hanging out at Ludvig and Suvi's bar instead of studying, and Ratko spends too little time away from home, Nikola forgets about Jagoda's birthday.
2	2	"Lažni policajci"	10 January 2023
3	3	"Provala u školu"	16 January 2023
4	4	"Ljubomora"	17 January 2023
5	5	"Maturalac"	23 January 2023
6	6	"Mirovinski zaostatak"	24 January 2023
7	7	"Zelena trava doma moga, 1. dio"	30 January 2023
8	8	"Zelena trava doma moga, 2. dio"	31 January 2023
9	9	"Agentica"	6 February 2023
10	10	"Brojilo"	7 February 2023
11	11	"Cvijeće za mamu"	13 February 2023
12	12	"Talijanske cipele"	14 February 2023
13	13	"Božja kazna"	20 February 2023
14	14	"Snovi"	21 February 2023

=== Season 2 (2024) ===
No. overall	No. in season	Title	Original release date
15	1	"Stara tetka, novi poštar"	11 March 2024
Nikola and Požgaj are assigned to investigate a case of "impossible thefts", where elderly citizens claim they were robbed and no one was allowed into their apartments. Since the case is progressing slowly, Božo reassigns them to another case - the disappearance of suitcases on the Zagreb - Sisak bus line. At the same time, Jagoda spends more and more time in the pleasant company of the new neighbor.
16	2	"I autoškola je škola"	12 March 2024
17	3	"Veseli dani u našem kvartu"	18 March 2024
18	4	"Skidanje uroka"	19 March 2024
19	5	"Mesarski pomoćnik"	25 March 2024
20	6	"Ulični psi"	26 March 2024
21	7	"Vrijeme ljubavi"	1 April 2024
22	8	"Bonton i kleptomanija"	2 April 2024
23	9	"Falsifikatori (1. dio)"	8 April 2024
Jagoda has chickenpox, an illness that can be serious at her age, so Nikola is left alone with his sons and begins to take care of them. Croatia has just joined Schengen and the eurozone, and the newspapers are full of news about fake euros in circulation.
24	10	"Falsifikatori (2. dio)"	9 April 2024

=== Season 3 (2025) ===
No. overall	No. in season	Title	Original release date
25	1	"Mala pomoć"	31 March 2025
26	2	"Potres"	1 April 2025
27	3	"Finale Roland Garrosa"	7 April 2025
Jagoda is worried about Mr. Ranko, who claims to be Björn Borg. The fact that the matter is not innocent is confirmed when Mr. Borg disappears from a retirement home after a masquerade ball.
28	4	"Mali pad"	8 April 2025
29	5	"Baka na čekanju"	14 April 2025
30	6	"Nesuđeni sin"	15 April 2025
31	7	"Škripavi zubi"	22 April 2025
32	8	"Ljubavna lavina"	28 April 2025
33	9	"Dan u prirodi"	29 April 2025
34	10	"Privatni detektiv"	5 May 2025
35	11	"Fantomas"	6 May 2025
36	12	"Dućan rabljenih vinila"	12 May 2025
