= Stela Rade =

Croatian singer (born 1998)

- Born: Stela Rade; 14 July 1998 (age 28); Croatia
- Origin: Jastrebarsko
- Genre: Pop-folk
- Occupations: Singer; accordionist
- Instruments: Voice; accordion
- Years active: 2019–present
- Label: Aquarius Records
- Television: Zvezde Granda; Tvoje lice zvuči poznato (season 9); Dora 2026

Stela Rade (born 14 July 1998) is a Croatian singer and accordionist.

== Early life ==
Stela Rade was born on 14 July 1998. She attended gymnasium in Jastrebarsko.

== Career ==
Rade competed on the fourteenth season of the Serbian singing reality television series Zvezde Granda. In October 2023, Rade and her mother Lidija performed on Supertalent, the Croatian edition of Got Talent. In December 2023, she released her first EP titled Korak po korak.

In January 2024, Rade came to media attention when her performance in Sveti Ivan Zelina got cancelled by the town's mayor. Rade speculated that the cancellation may have been due to her planned use of the accordion, an instrument she noted is still negatively perceived in some parts of Croatia due to its association with turbo-folk.

In February 2024, Rade released "Balkan Pop," a song submitted to Dora 2024, Croatia's national selection for the Eurovision Song Contest 2024, but it was not chosen for the final lineup. She later released a music video presenting her envisioned Eurovision performance, which quickly gained over 145,000 views on YouTube.

On 24 February 2025, Rade was announced to compete on the ninth season of the singing reality television series Tvoje lice zvuči poznato, the Croatian edition of Your Face Sounds Familiar. She won the first episode of the season performing as Josipa Lisac. Rade ultimately won the season.

On 3 December 2025, HRT announced that Rade was chosen to compete on Dora 2026, the Croatian national final for Eurovision Song Contest 2026, with the song "Nema te." Rade performed in the second semi-final on 13 February 2026 and qualified for the grand final, which was held on 15 February. She ultimately placed third at the contest.

== Artistry ==
In addition to the accordion, for which she is particularly known and frequently incorporates into her performances, Rade also plays guitar, keyboards, and drums. Her musical style has been characterized as a blend of electronic music and traditional Balkan rhythms.

== Discography ==
=== Singles ===
- "Nije me strah" (2022)
- "Briga me" (2023)
- "Balkan Pop" (2024)
- "Može se, mora se" (2024)
- "Slobodna" (2024)
- "Rakia & muzika" (2025)
- "Nema te" (2026)
- "Rumba" (2026)

=== EPs ===
- Korak po korak (2023)
