= Super Billy =

Animated TV series

- Created by: Berin Tuzlić
- Voices of: Amra Kapidžić; Enis Bešlagić; Aleksandar Seksan; Semir Krivić; Alban Ukaj; Labinot Lajçi
- Country of origin: Bosnia and Herzegovina
- Original language: Bosnian
- No. of seasons: 4
- No. of episodes: 53

Production
- Running time: 20 minutes

Original release
- Network: BHT 1
- Release: November 10, 2004 – July 10, 2007

Super Billy or Super Bili is a Bosnian animated television series created by Berin Tuzlić. Super Billy was aired on BHT 1 and Cartoon Network.

== Cast ==
- Amra Kapidžić as Super Bili/Lili/Čili
- Enis Bešlagić as Žlof
- Aleksandar Seksan as Buco
- Semir Krivić as Kobajagi
- Alban Ukaj as Baka (Grandma)
