= Mark Marku (singer) =

Kosovo Albanian singer

- Born: Mark Xhon Kastriot Marku; 6 December 1991 (age 34); Prizren, SR Serbia, SFR Yugoslavia
- Genres: Pop, pop folk
- Occupation: Singer
- Instruments: Vocals
- Years active: 2011–present

Mark Xhon Kastriot Marku (born 6 December 1991) is an Albanian singer. He rose to fame after taking part in the third season of Hrvatska traži zvijezdu, where he finished third overall. After his appearance on the show, he released his music both in Croatian and Albanian.

== Biography ==
Mark Xhon Kastriot Marku was born on 6 December 1991 in Prizren, to a Catholic family of musicians. He grew up, finished his elementary and the Lorenc Antoni music high school in his hometown and moved to Zagreb, Croatia for his university studies. He signed up for Hrvatska traži zvijezdu (Croatia searches a star), the Croatian version of Idols just for fun. He successfully passed the first stages of the show, and was advanced to perform in front of the judges. He received a positive feedback, both from the jury and the audience. Later on, he was one of the main favorites acts to win the show. In the final night he finished third, respectively.

After the show, he released "Da si htjela" (If you wanted), a successful single in Croatia, who was later brought to the Albanian-speaking territories as "Për ty" (For you). Although Mark continued not to have the same popularity in Kosovo or Albania like in Croatia, he promised that he would return strongly in the Albanian music-industry.

In November 2013, Marku announced that he would make his Albanian debut in Kënga Magjike 2013.
