= Supertalent =

2009 Croatian reality show

- The title card for the series
- Genre: Reality competition; Talent show
- Created by: Simon Cowell
- Based on: Britain's Got Talent by Simon Cowell
- Presented by: Igor Mešin; Frano Ridjan
- Judges: Davor Bilman; Maja Šuput; Fabijan Pavao Medvešek; Martina Tomčić
- Country of origin: Croatia
- Original language: Croatian
- No. of seasons: 13
- No. of episodes: 159

Production
- Production company: Fremantle

Original release
- Network: Nova TV
- Release: 25 September 2009 – present

Related
- Got Talent

Supertalent is a Croatian reality television talent show based on the British talent show Got Talent by Simon Cowell and Ken Warwick. The series employs a panel of judges who look for the person with the most outstanding talent.

Supertalent premiered on 25 September 2009 on Nova TV. The series initially ran for three seasons until 2011, after which a short hiatus followed until 2016. Since 2017, the series is a staple part of Nova TV's fall schedule. The thirteenth season premiered on 27 September 2026.

== Format ==
A season of Supertalent generally consists of auditions, semi-finals and a grand finale. In the earlier seasons, five big auditions were held in the Croatian cities of Split, Rijeka, Zadar, Zagreb, and Osijek. In the auditions stage, the contestant present their talents to the judges. The judges then vote on whether or not the contestant was good enough to qualify for the next round. Each of the judges, as well as the hosts and the audience, can use one golden buzzer (Croatian: Zlatni gumb) to allow their favorite contestant an immediate qualification to the semi finals.

After the auditions, there are semi-final and a final shows where the public choose one winner. Since 2023, the main prize received by the winner is 30,000 euros. The final show is usually shot live; it took place in Arena Zagreb in 2025.

== Hosts and judges ==
The series was initially hosted by Rene Bitorajac and Igor Mešin. The latter was replaced by Frano Ridjan from the seventh season onward, whereas Mešin remained the host for the entirety of the series.

As of 2026, the members of the jury are Davor Bilman (dancer and former Ples sa zvijezdama judge), Fabijan Pavao Medvešek (television actor), Maja Šuput (pop singer), and Martina Tomčić (opera singer).

Judges on Supertalent
Judge	Season												
Judge	1	2	3	4	5	6	7	8	9	10	11	12	13
Enis Bešlagić	Main	Main	Main										
Nina Badrić	Main	Main	Main										
Dubravko Merlić	Main	Main	Main										
Mario Petreković				Main									
Danijela Martinović				Main									
Mislav Čavajda				Main									
Martina Tomčić				Main	Main	Main	Main	Main	Main	Main	Main	Main	Main
Davor Bilman					Main	Main	Main	Main	Main	Main	Main	Main	Main
Maja Šuput					Main	Main	Main	Main	Main	Main	Main	Main	Main
Janko Popović Volarić					Main	Main	Main	Main					
Fabijan Pavao Medvešek									Main	Main	Main	Main	Main

== Series overview ==
Season	Episodes	Originally released		Winner(s)	Runner(s)-up
Season	Episodes	First released	Last released	Winner(s)	Runner(s)-up
1	13	25 September 2009	18 December 2009	Tihomir Bendelja	Monica Rogić
2	14	17 September 2010	17 December 2010	Viktorija Novosel	Aleksandar Olujić
3	14	18 September 2011	18 December 2011	Promenada Klub	Borislav Vranić
4	13	13 March 2016	12 June 2016	Petar Bruno Basić	Transform Crew
5	13	24 September 2017	17 December 2017	Emil Kuzminski and Mateja Ivanković	Martin Kutnar
6	13	23 September 2018	16 December 2018	Denis Barta	Siniša Matijević
7	13	29 September 2019	22 December 2019	Plesna skupina Transform Crew	Marko Antolković
8	13	26 September 2021	19 December 2021	Anatacha Filimone	Siena Uremović
9	13	24 September 2022	18 December 2022	Magic Leon	TBA
10	13	24 September 2023	24 December 2023	Chriztel Renae Aceveda	Emina Bajtarević
11	13	29 September 2024	22 December 2024	Tamia Šeme	TBA
12	13	28 September 2025	21 December 2025	Duo Turkeev & Kids	TBA
13	TBA	27 September 2026	2026	TBA	TBA

=== Season 1 (2009) ===
The first season aired from 25 September to 18 December 2009. Tihomir Bendelja won.

Supertalent season 1 finalists
Contestant	Act	Place
Antonija Dora Pleško	Singing	4th
Atomic Dance Factory	Dancing	3rd
Mateo Ravlija	Singing	8th
Monica Rogić	Singing	2nd
Nina Kraljić	Singing	10th
Sinovi	Dancing	5th
Step by Step	Step	9th
Tihomir Bendelja	Twirling	Winner
Unit X	Dancing	7th
Deborah Šuker & Marijan Kešinović	Dancing	6th

=== Season 2 (2010) ===
The second season began broadcasting on 17 September 2010 and ended on 17 December 2010. The winner was Victoria Novosel.

Supertalent season 2 finalists
Contestant	Act	Place
Aleksandar Olujić	Playing accordion	2nd
Antonia Barišić	Singing	10th
D'N'F	Dancing	4th
D Vision	Dancing	8th
Jana Klarić	Rhythmic Gymnastics	6th
Kristijan & Kristijan	Breakdance	5th
Maja Terzić and Nessa	Dog training	3rd
Petra Antolić	Singing	9th
Skandal Band	Drumming	7th
Viktorija Novosel	Singing	Winner

=== Season 3 (2011) ===
The third season started on 18 September 2011 and ended on 18 December 2011. The winner was the group Promenada Klub.

Supertalent season 3 finalists
Contestant	Act	Place
Borna Baričević and Iva Miljak	Dancing	7th
Antonio Tkalec	Singing	8th
Eva Pilić	Singing	5th
Breakdance club Nexus	Dancing	3rd
Borislav Vranić	Entertainer	2nd
Rebecca Posavec	Singing	6th
Promenada Klub	Shadow Theatre	Winner
Dancingni Punktovi Zagreb	Dancing	10th
Endi Schrotter	Dancing	4th
Air Flow	Dancing/Tricking	9th

=== Season 4 (2016) ===
Supertalent season 4 finalists
Contestant	Act	Place
Tomi Mihićinac	Stunts	13th
A.K.A Crescendo	A cappella singing	12th
Devin Juraj	Dancer	11th
Dance group Brutala	Dancing	10th
Step 'n' Jazz Dubrovnik	Dancing/Step	9th
Lana & Vicky	Dog training	8th
Petar Bruno Basić	Poledance	Winner
Jelena Znaor	Hula-Hoop	7th
Luka Pirić	Rubik's cube solving	6th
Malci	Dancing	5th
Stjepan Magdić	Harmonica	4th
Erik Balija	Singing	3rd
Transform Crew	Dancing	2nd

=== Season 5 (2017) ===
The fifth season premiered in September 2017 and ended in December 2017. Dancers Emil and Mateja won.

=== Season 6 (2018) ===
The sixth season premiered on 24 September 2018 and ended in December 2018. The winner was Denis Barta.

=== Season 7 (2019) ===
The seventh season premiered in September 2019 and ended in December 2019. The winner was the dance club Transform Crew.

=== Season 8 (2021) ===
The eighth season started in September 2021 and ended in December 2021. The winner was Anatacha Filimone.

=== Season 9 (2022) ===
The ninth season started on 24 September 2022, and ended on 18 December 2022. The winner was Magic Leon.

=== Season 10 (2023) ===
Nova TV announced the tenth season in September 2023. The season aired between 24 September 2023 and 24 December 2023. The winner was Chriztel Renae Aceveda.

Supertalent season 10 finalists
Contestant	Act	Place
Force Celje	Dancing	Unknown
Vladyslava Kushnir	Dancing	Unknown
Chriztel Renae Aceveda	Singing	Winner
Ena Nižić	Singing	Unknown
Karyna Zubal	Dancing	Unknown
Emina Bajtarević	Singing	2nd
Andi Ismaili	Dancing	Unknown
Crowd Control (Sonja and Jan)	Variety	3rd
Jay Dance Studio	Dancing	Unknown
Tijana Divac i Marko Haos	Variety	Unknown
Ana Dorušak	Singing	Unknown
Paula Jeličić - Pumah	Dancing	Unknown

=== Season 11 (2024) ===
The eleventh season premiered on 29 September 2024. Tamia Šeme won by earning more than 47% of the viewers' votes.

=== Season 12 (2025) ===
The twelfth season premiered on 28 September 2025. The season was won by Duo Turkeev & Kids.

=== Season 13 (2026) ===
The thirteenth season premiered on 27 September 2026 on Nova TV, with the episodes released a day earlier on Nova Play.
