= Igor Cukrov =

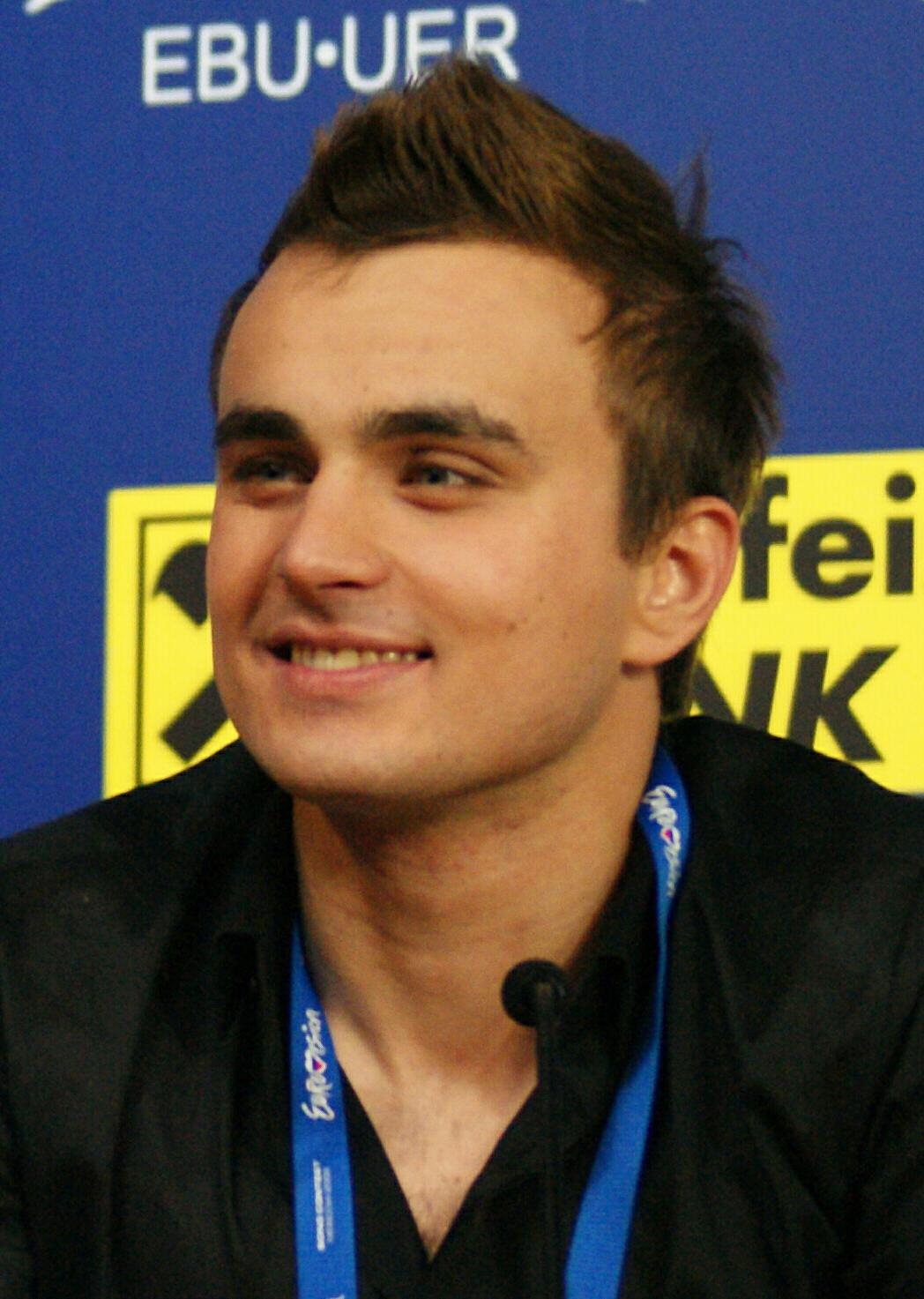
- Cukrov in 2009

Background information
- Born: Igor Cukrov; 6 June 1984 (age 42); Šibenik, SR Croatia, SFR Yugoslavia
- Origin: Split, Croatia
- Genres: Pop; rock; pop rock; bel canto
- Occupations: Singer; songwriter; musician; television personality
- Instruments: Vocals; piano; guitar; clarinet; trumpet
- Years active: 2008–present
- Label: Melody Music

Igor Cukrov (born 6 June 1984) is a Croatian singer-songwriter, musician and television personality. He came to media attention as one of sixteen contestants of talents show Operacija trijumf, Balkan version of Endemol's Star Academy. Cukrov represented Croatia in the Eurovision Song Contest 2009, alongside Andrea Šušnjara, with the song "Lijepa Tena", written by Tonči Huljić. The song qualified to the final from the second semi-final as the jury's selected qualifier. It eventually finished in the 18th place with 45 points.

== Career ==
=== Early career ===
Since early childhood, Cukrov showed interest for music, in 1991. He won the first prize in "Moj prvi nastup" led by Remi Kazinotti. In 1993, he won first prize for first voice of "Pojišan" school, than later third place in category of all schools of Split.

In 1994, Cukrov participated in children's version on Split Festival, singing the song "Mali vrabac". In 2003 he won the first prize for the first voice of Šibenik-Knin County.

Cukrov performed at the Split Festival, where he was awarded a prize for best debutant (2007) and he has also gained experience as a tenor of the a cappella Cambi singers.

=== Operacija trijumf ===
The Operacija trijumf was the Balkan version of Endemol's talents show Star Academy. It included the young talents from whole former SFR Yugoslavia (except Slovenia and Kosovo) – Bosnia and Herzegovina, Croatia, Macedonia, Montenegro and Serbia. The show began on 29 September 2008. Cukrov showcased his singing abilities through a wide repertory, singing opera songs such as "Con te partirò" of Andrea Bocelli, but also rock songs such as "Angie" of the Rolling Stones and "I Don't Want to Miss a Thing" of Aerosmith. The contestants of the Operacija trijumf, including Cukrov, supported Goran Karan at his concert in Belgrade, singing "Stand by Me".

Igor Cukrov was expelled on the 13th gala event, losing in telephone voting to Vukašin Brajić. During the show, there were some rumors that the judge Tonči Huljić is very protective about Cukrov, because he was never nominated, until the twelfth gala; Huljić later stated that expelling Cukrov was an injustice.

During the Operacija trijumf, Igor Cukrov performed the following songs:

- Gibonni & Oliver Dragojević – "U ljubav vjere nemam" with the student Nikola Paunović (Gala 1)
- Željko Joksimović – "Leđa o leđa" with Željko Joksimović (Gala 2)
- Dino Merlin & Željko Joksimović – "Supermen" with the student Vukašin Brajić (Gala 3)
- Gibonni – "Libar" (Gala 4)
- Kemal Monteno – "Nije htjela" with Kemal Monteno (Gala 5)
- Andrea Bocelli – "Con te partirò" (Gala 6)
- Oliver Mandić – "Poludeću" (Gala 7)
- The Beatles – "Yesterday" (Gala 8)
- Bijelo dugme – "Ako ima Boga" (Gala 9)
- Indexi – "Žute dunje" (Gala 10)
- The Beatles – "Help!"/"A Hard Day's Night" with all male students (Gala 11)
- Zdravko Čolić – "Jedna zima s Kristinom" (Gala 11)
- Celine Dion – "My Heart Will Go On" with the student Nina Petković (Gala 11)
- The Rolling Stones – "Angie" (Gala 12)
- Prljavo kazalište/VIS Idoli – "Mi plešemo"/"Maljčiki" with the students Ana Bebić and Vukašin Brajić (Gala 12)
- Aerosmith – "I Don't Want to Miss a Thing" (Gala 13)
- U2 – "With or Without You" (Gala 13) with the student Vukašin Brajić
- Film – "Pjevajmo do zore" with the students Andrea Harapin, Ivana Nikodijević and Kristijan Jovanov (Semifinal, revival)

=== Eurovision Song Contest 2009 ===
After the Operacija trijumf, all the contestants expressed the will to participate at the Eurovision Song Contest 2009, which was held in Moscow. The Croatian OT contestants Cukrov and Ana Bebić immediately qualified for the final event. The song "Lijepa Tena" was written and composed by famous Croatian musician Tonči Huljić. The Croatian final for the Eurovision Song Contest – Dora – was held on 28 February 2008, and Igor Cukrov won with the total of 30 points. The song competed in the second semi-final where it won qualification for the final as the jury's selected pick. It finished in 18th place.

=== Tvoje lice zvuči poznato ===
On 24 February 2025, Cukrov was announced to compete on the ninth season of the singing reality television series Tvoje lice zvuči poznato, the Croatian edition of Your Face Sounds Familiar. In the season, he won the fourth episode performing as Tony Cetinski, and the sixth episode as Oliver Dragojević.

== Discography ==
=== Albums ===
- 2009: Upcoming compilation of Operacija trijumf contestants

=== Singles ===
- 2007: "Dusa mi je bili kamen" (Splitski festival 2007.)
- 2009: "Lijepa Tena" EUROSONG FINALS
- 2009: "Mjesečar" (Splitski festival)
- 2009: "Nebesa" (with [Magazin])
- 2010: "Moja draga" [Pjesma Mediterana, Budva, Montenegro]
- "Dalmaciju minjat se ne moze" Trogir fest 2012.
- "Ajdemo jube"
- "Caca moj" (Puno mi falis caca moj) 2011.
- "Prolij vino po meni" (CMC festival Vodice)
- "Korak po korak" (Ohridski festival, MAKEDONIA) THIRD PLACE
- "Kraj mene si ti" (Igor Cukrov ft. Bojan Delic)
- (Festival Suncane Skale, Herceg novi, Montenegro), Hit records
- "Prida bi se mandolini" (Trogir festival, "Slavuji kamelenga Vinko Coce) FIRST PLACE
- "Slucajno" - Igor Cukrov ft. Ana Duderija-Sucur (Hit records)
- "Fali mi" (Hit records)
- "Haljina na pruge" (Hit records)
- "Treba li mi netko kao ti" (Hit records) 2010.(Splitski festival)
- "Za one sto su kao mi" (CMC festival Vodice 2012.)
- "Znaes li" (Skopje fest, MAKEDONIA, 2013.)
- "Sanjaj Hrvatska" (Croatian music channel, CMC festival Vodice 2013.)
- "Jedna dusa jedno tilo" 2014. (Hit records)
- "Jedino ti znas me va dusu" MiK (Melodije Istre i Kvarnera) 2015.
- "Volio sam cure" (Hit records) (CMC festival Vodice 2015.)
- "E moj admirale" (Splitski festival 2015.)
- "Daruj srecu novim ljudima" (Hit records) 2016.
- 2017: "Da te zagrlim" (Hit records)
- "Svoj na svome" Igor Cukrov & Mile Perkov (Croatian music channel, CMC festival Vodice 2022.)

== See also ==
- Croatia in the Eurovision Song Contest
- Croatia in the Eurovision Song Contest 2009

Preceded by Kraljevi ulice & 75 Cents with Romanca	Croatia in the Eurovision Song Contest; 2009 (with Andrea)	Succeeded by Feminnem with Lako je sve
