= Viktorija Novosel =

Croatian singer (born 1989)

- Born: Viktorija Novosel; March 18, 1989 (age 37); Zagreb, SR Croatia, SFR Yugoslavia
- Genres: Pop
- Occupation: Singer
- Instruments: Vocals, guitar, clarinet
- Years active: 2010–present
- Label: Menart

Viktorija Novosel (born 18 March 1989) is a Croatian singer. She rose to fame as the winner of the second season of Supertalent.

== Discography ==
- Kroz šumu (2011)
