= Igor Mešin =

Croatian actor and television host (born 1967)

- Born: 8 July 1967 (age 58); Zagreb, SFR Yugoslavia
- Occupations: Actor; television host
- Spouse: Antonina Mešin

Igor Mešin (born 8 July 1967) is a Croatian actor and television host.

== Early life and education ==
Igor Mešin was born 8 July 1967 in Zagreb. He graduated at the Academy of Dramatic Art in Zagreb.

== Career ==
Mešin's first movie role was in The Promised Land in 1986. Beginning in early 2000s, he starred in many Croatian television series. He is most known for his role of Milan "Mile" Car in Nova TV's 2004 sitcom Naša mala klinika. He also starred in Luda kuća, Odmori se, zaslužio si, Bračne vode, and Dar mar.

In 2008, Mešin began working as a television host for various projects on Nova TV. He first hosted Ne zaboravi stihove in 2008. Since 2009, he is one of the hosts on Supertalent, the Croatian edition of Got Talent, having co-hosted all eleven seasons so far. In 2014, Nova TV announced that Mešin would also host Tvoje lice zvuči poznato, the Croatian iteration of Your Face Sounds Familiar. Mešin was so far featured in all nine seasons of the series; he was on the judging panel for the sixth and the seventh seasons, and he has co-hosted every other season.

== Filmography ==
=== Television ===
Year	Title	Role	Notes
2004–2007	Naša mala klinika	Milan Car	Main role
2005–2013	Odmori se, zaslužio si	Neno Kosmički	Main role
2008–2009	Ne zaboravi stihove	Himself	Host
2008–2009	Bračne vode	Ivan "Ivica" Kumarica	Main role
2009–present	Supertalent	Himself	Host
2014–present	Tvoje lice zvuči poznato	Himself	Host (seasons 1–5, 8–9)
2014–present	Tvoje lice zvuči poznato	Himself	Main judge (seasons 6–7)
2015	Samo ti pričaj	Ivan Jakšić	Main role
2020	Dar mar	Župan	
2023–present	Oblak u službi zakona	Požgaj	
