= Croatian Armed Forces Band =

- Orkestar Oružanih snaga Republike Hrvatske
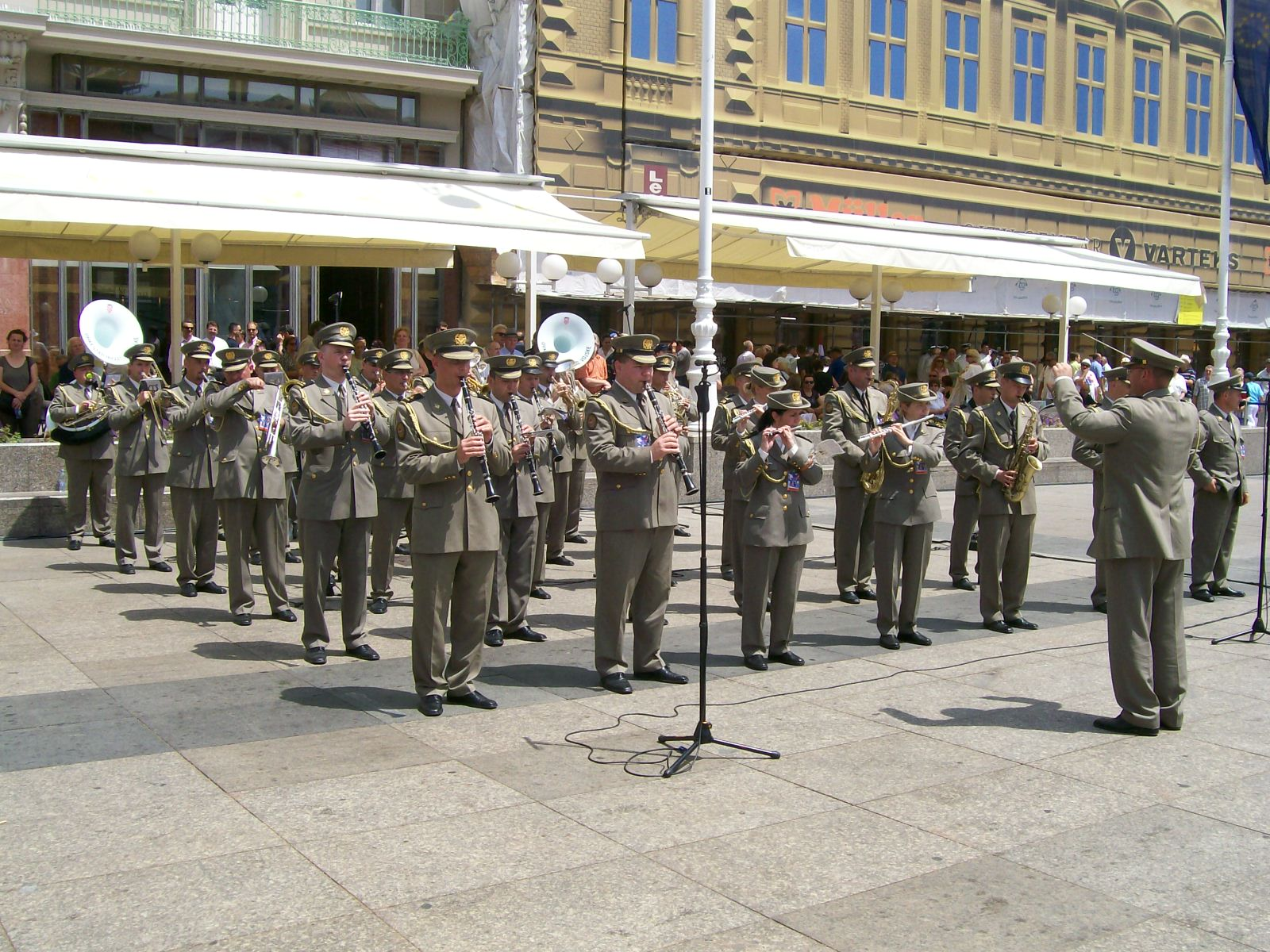
- Active: 1991 – Present
- Country: Croatia
- Branch: Armed Forces of Croatia
- Type: Military Band
- Role: Public duties
- Part of: OSRH Support Command
- Garrison/HQ: Zagreb
- Nickname: OSRH Band
- Current form: 2008

Commanders
- Current commander: Lieutenant Colonel Miroslav Vukovojac-Dugan
- Notable commanders: Tedi Lušetić; Mladen Tarbuk

The Croatian Armed Forces Band is a special military unit that performs military music for the ceremonial and national events involving the service personnel and veterans of the Croatian Armed Forces, as well as provide musical accompaniment for other events as may be requested. As part of the Support Command of the Armed Forces, it is a unified organization that is responsible for the operation and upkeep of the military bands in service within Croatia. The band was founded in 1991 and was recently reorganised in 2008.

== History ==
Led by bandmaster Josip Janković, the band gave its first public performance on May 28, 1991 at the Kranjčevićeva Street in Zagreb. It was originally composed of former officers and personnel of the Yugoslav People's Army who were based in the Socialist Republic of Croatia, as well as members of the local paramilitary forces, all of whom were based at Marshal Tito Barracks (now Rudolf barracks). The official OSRH band was established at the end of 1991 in the halls of the Defense Ministry. Its first protocol activity as an official military unit took place on 14 January 1992 on the occasion of the visit of President Francesco Cossiga of Italy to Zagreb. In 1992, the band played a role in maintaining the esprit de corps of combat troops by performing on the frontlines during the Yugoslav Wars. In the winter of 1992, the band received 15 new musicians, all of whom were graduates of the Academy of Music, University of Zagreb (MUZA). Around that same time, the band gained an official full dress uniform. By decree of defense minister Gojko Šušak on May 1, 1995, the band was converted into a symphony orchestra. Going into the 21st century, it began to perform at a variety of events, including the visit of Pope John Paul II in Zagreb and the opening of the Dubrovnik Summer Games in 1997. In 2008, the band began to operates a support service for army bands in the country. In 2015, during the 20th anniversary celebrations of Operation Storm, Lijepa naša domovino was performed by 12-year old Mia Negovetić, who was accompanied by the Armed Forces Band and the vocal ensemble.

== Organization ==
- Marching band of the Croatian Armed Forces
- Symphonic Wind Orchestra of the Croatian Armed Forces (Zagreb)
- Jazz Band of the Croatian Armed Forces
- Croatian Navy Orchestra (Split)
- Navy Vocal Ensemble “Sv. Juraj“ Split

=== Jazz Band ===
The Jazz Band of the OSRH is the official big band unit of the band. It currently consists of five saxophones, one flute, four trombones, and four trumpets. It also has a rhythm section within its ranks. It has become very famous in the military sphere and has gained the title of musical ambassadors of the armed forces.

=== Navy Vocal Ensemble “Sv. Juraj“ ===
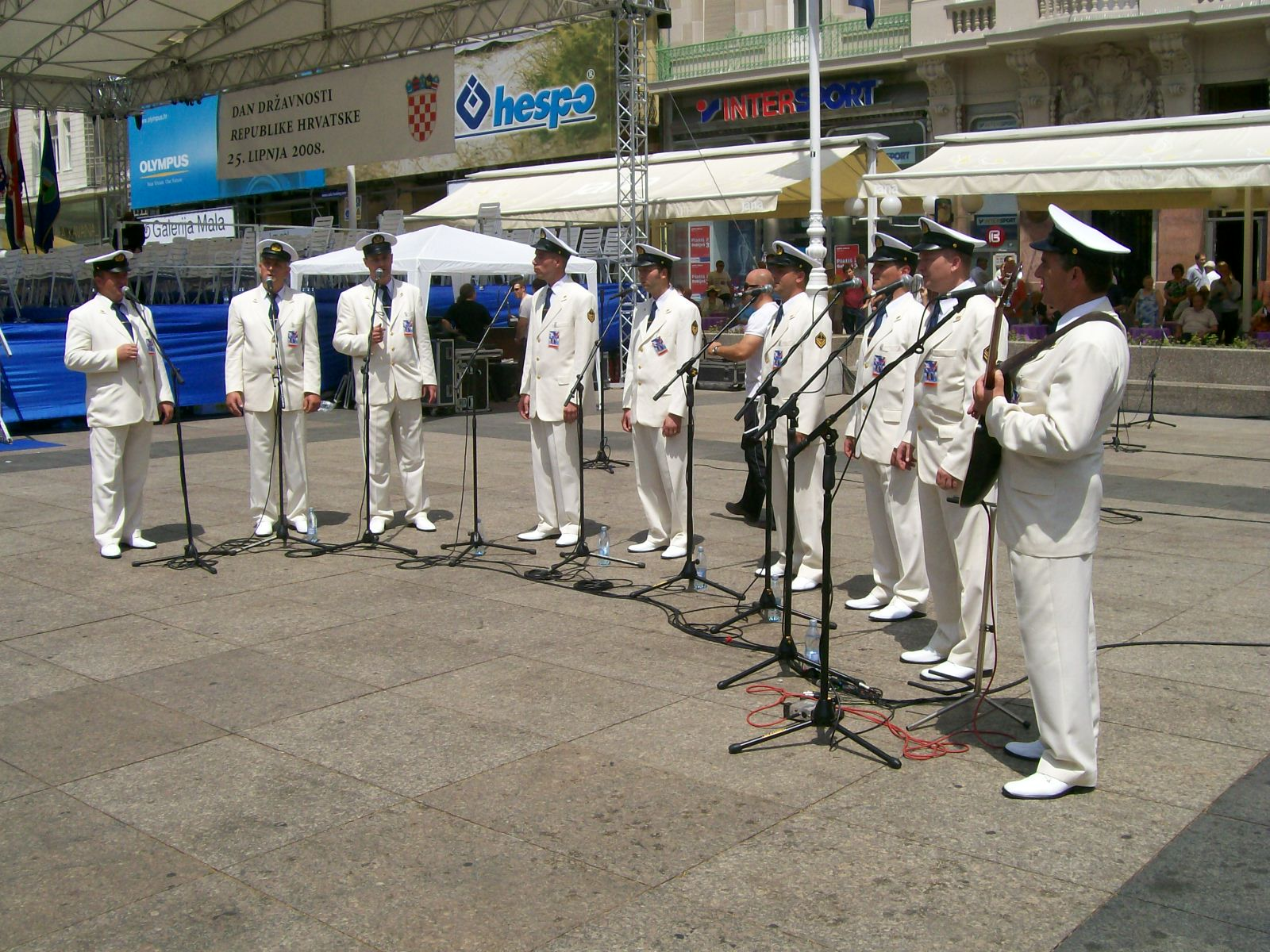
The naval ensemble.

The vocal ensemble was founded in early 2001 with the aim of preserving and promoting Croatian a cappella culture along with producing patriotic character in sailors. It has held many performances outside of the country, including at events in Italy, Germany, Poland, Belgium, Hungary, France, and Austria. It has even performed at NATO headquarters in Haren, Belgium.

== Musical repritoire ==
The following is an overview of the musical repertoire of the OSRH Band:

Title	Composer
Svečana Koračnica	Unknown
Živila Hrvatska	Ivan Zajc
Koračnica «Mi smo Garda Hrvatska»	Mladen Kvesić
Koračnica «Moja Domovina»	Josip Skrašek
Marjane, Marjane	Ivo Tijardović

== In popular culture ==
- The vocal ensemble was featured in the documentary La Chorale de Croatie by Nike Kostanića.
- In December 2015, the choral group performed Christmas music for the Croatian diaspora in Pittsburgh.
