= Marcela Oroši =

Croatian singer

- Occupation: Singer
- Television: Hrvatska traži zvijezdu (season 3); Tvoje lice zvuči poznato (season 9)

Marcela Oroši is a Croatian singer.

== Early life ==
Marcela Oroši was born in Crikvenica, where she spent the first 20 years of her life, having completed music school with a focus on classical guitar while also singing in both city and church choirs and performing as a member of two local bands.

== Career ==
In 2011, Oroši competed on the third season of RTL's Idol series Hrvatska traži zvijezdu, where she placed as a runner-up. She was a member of a girl band Luminize, along with Matilda Oroši, Irena Rogović and Tea Mišković. In 2014, the band released a single titled "Kill It With Love," which was followed by the release of their debut studio album All or Nothing in 2016. In 2018, Luminize competed on The Voice of Holland.

In 2024, Oroši competed on Dora 2024, the Croatian national final for Eurovision Song Contest 2024. She qualified for the grand final with the song "Gasoline" and finished sixth with a total of 59 points.

On 24 February 2025, Oroši was announced to compete on the ninth season of the singing reality television series Tvoje lice zvuči poznato, the Croatian edition of Your Face Sounds Familiar. She won the second episode of the season performing as Doris Dragović and the tenth episode as Vesna Zmijanac.

== Discography ==
=== Singles ===
- "Nismo isti svijet" (2023)
- "Gasoline" (2024)
- "Ovako ne ide" (2024)

=== Albums ===
- All or Nothing (2016, with Luminize)
- Covers (2023)
