= Rešad Bešlagić =

Bosnian folk singer

- Born: 1912; Tuzla, Condominium of Bosnia and Herzegovina, Austria-Hungary
- Died: 4 April 1945 (aged 32–33); Sarajevo, Independent State of Croatia
- Occupation: singer
- Years active: 1928–45
- Musical career
- Genres: Bosnian folk; sevdalinka
- Instrument: vocals

Rešad Bešlagić (1912 – 4 April 1945) was a Bosnian folk singer and sevdalinka interpreter.

== Biography ==
Bešlagić was born in Tuzla, Bosnia and Herzegovina shortly before World War I broke out in 1914.

During his youth, he studied law at the University of Belgrade Faculty of Law where he started his singing career at Radio Belgrade.

He was killed during World War II by fascist Ustaše troops in Sarajevo, aged 36. Despite this, during the time of communist Yugoslavia he was mistakenly put on the list of the Jasenovac concentration camp victims.
