= Electro Team =

Croatian Eurodance band

- Origin: Zagreb, Croatia
- Genres: Dance, Eurodance, Europop
- Years active: 1987–present
- Labels: ZG ZOE Music (1994-1996); Croatia Records (1997-2001); Gold Music (2002-2006); Hit Records (2007-present)
- Members: Adonis Ćulibrk; Meri Andraković
- Past members: Vanna; Darko Juranović; Nino Mlinac; Sky Rocker; Andrea Čubrić; Lana Klingor Mihić; Fresh Jay; DJ Furious; Katarina Rautek; Sara Elena Menkovska

Electro Team (ET) is a hip hop/eurodance band from Croatia, active since 1987.

ET's July 1993 single "Tek je 12 sati" was named by journalists and music critics as Croatia's hit of the decade. E.T. saw their greatest popularity while performing with their former lead singer Vanna, who joined the band in 1991 and left for solo career in 1998.

== History ==
Electro Team was formed in Zagreb in 1987 by Adonis Ćulibrk – Boytronic. The band was inspired by the legendary hip-hop / electro band Mantronix. At that time, on Boytronic's invitation, Darko Juranovic D'Knock (then known under the pseudonyms DáReal and Doc. DáReal), joined the band, and they started a demo recording period in which they created several songs. At the end of the 1980s, Sky Rocker joined the band, but at the beginning of the Homeland War he went to the United States. The band had their first public performance in 1989 on Z3 Television (an experimental programme on Croatian Radiotelevision) where they performed “Miami Ladies“ in their own artistic interpretation. At that time, Vanna (Ivana Ranilović, today Vrdoljak), their future singer, still wasn't a part of their group. To the present day the band has put out seven studio albums. The band collaborated with the producer Ilan Kabiljo who at the time had a duet with Ivana Ranilović which was called Ilan & Ivana. Ivana soon became a backup singer in ET and the combination of hip hop and a female vocal proved to be very successful. Sky Rocker returned to Croatia in 1992 and took part in the production of ET's debut album Electro Team produced by Tomo in der Mühlen which was mostly hip hop and pop rap oriented with heavy use of male rap vocals while Vanna's appeared just in some songs. ET was becoming more and more popular, which made them the first Croatian music band that appeared on MTV.

In spring 1991 Ivana Ranilović left the duet Ilan & Ivana and finally joined ET under her artistic name Vanna. During the war they recorded a song "Molitva za mir" (A Prayer for Peace) which became a huge hit and one of the most popular patriotic songs. In July 1993, they released "Tek je 12 sati" (It's Only 12 O'clock), a tremendously successful hit which, a few years later, was proclaimed the Croatian hit of the decade. The song also had a modern video which at that time was known in public as the most expensive video in the country ever.

Second to None their second studio album, recorded in 1994 brought turn to eurodance with more lead female vocals and became an instant success. At that time Vanna comes to be considered the best Croatian dance singer and the album, which generated eight hit singles, was even more popular than the first one. The same year the band won the most important Croatian music award – Porin – in the categories for the best group vocal performance and the best video. In 1995, they received a Porin for the best single of the year for the song "Da ti nisam bila dovoljna" (That I Wasn't Enough for You).

Their third studio album Anno Domini (1996) sold more than 60,000 copies, while the single from the album "Ja ti priznajem" (I Confess to You) became a huge success. By 1998, the band held many concerts and even became famous internationally. They set high standards in the production of videos, for which they got two Porin Awards. The same year Vanna and Darko Juranović D`Knock (then known as DáReal) left the band wanting to focus on their solo career.

In 2000 a new album was released with a new singer Andrea Čubrić under the title Disco Neckt. In 2001, another singer, Lana Klingor, replaced Andrea, and in Spring 2002, they put out another album called Vision 5 which brought a more commercial dance pop sound while male rap vocals were reduced to the minimum. This album brought them back to the top of the singles charts and Lana became accepted by the audience, bringing back the old and attracting some new fans. It sold very well and was certified Gold. They put out a compilation of their best hit singles from 1993 to 2003 under the title Decade, which was certified Silver.

In 2005, the band got a new singer, Katarina Rautek, and released their sixth album Frankfurt Bombay Tokyo, and in 2007, the album called Vrhunski album (An Excellent Album) whose sound is different from their previous, well-known style, bringing more softer europop and dance pop with elements of pop folk in some songs and without male rap vocals. In June 2007 the band celebrated 20 years since they were formed and started as the first rap and dance band in Croatia.

In 2010, they released their last album called Powercore. The album featured hit singles Prazan stan (Empty Flat) and Soba 202 (Room 202).

In April 2016, Katarina left E.T., and Sara-Elena Menkovska came in her place, who they first introduced at the CMC Festival 2016 with the song "Ako možeš, oprosti". After 4 months, cooperation with the new singer ended and since then the band E.T. had been on a break.

The next appearance of the band was in 2023, announcing a new collaboration with the singer Meri Andraković. The band was among the participants of Dora 2024, the Croatian selection for the Eurovision Song Contest 2024, with the song "Pametnom dosta"; they did not qualify for the final.

== Discography ==
=== Studio albums ===
- Electro Team (1992)
- Second to None (1994)
- Anno Domini (1996)
- Disco Neckt (2000)
- Vision 5 (2002)
- Frankfurt Bombay Tokyo (2005)
- Vrhunski album (2007)
- Powercore (2010)

=== Singles ===
- Molitva za mir (1991)
- New jam dance (1992)
- Tek je 12 sati (1993)
- Da ti nisam bila dovoljna (1994)
- Ne traži ljubav (1994)
- Ja ti priznajem (1995)
- Sve bih dala da znam (1996)
- S nama je gotovo (2005)
- Streetball jam (2020)
- Pametnom dosta (2024)

=== Compilation albums ===
- Ja ti priznajem (1995)
- Best of ET (2000)
- Decade (2003)
- Retrospective 1998-1991 (2020)

== See also ==
- Croatian popular music
