= Enis Bešlagić =

Bosnian actor and comedian (born 1975)

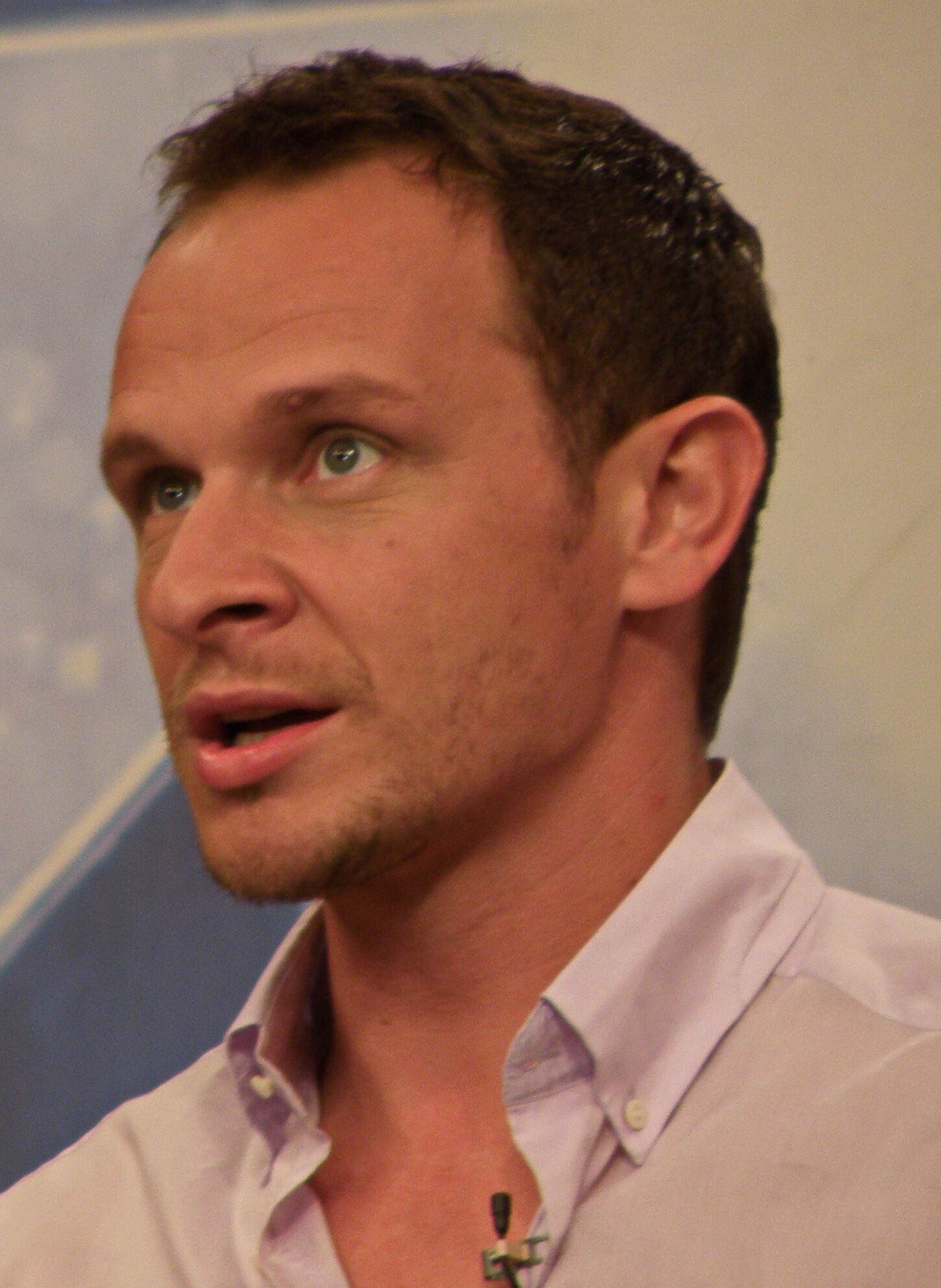
- Bešlagić in 2017
- Born: 6 January 1975 (age 51); Doboj, SR Bosnia and Herzegovina, Yugoslavia
- Citizenship: Bosnia and Herzegovina; Croatia
- Occupation: Actor
- Years active: 1998–present
- Spouse: Sabina Bešlagić
- Children: 2
- Relatives: Rešad Bešlagić (grandfather)

Enis Bešlagić (born 6 January 1975) is a Bosnian actor and comedian. In the 2000s, he starred in several films such as Fuse (2003), Summer in the Golden Valley (2003), Ivko's Feast (2005), Ram za sliku moje domovine (2005) and All for Free (2006). He starred in the sitcom Naša mala klinika from 2004 until 2007. Bešlagić and Bosnian actor Milan Pavlović portrayed the comedy duo Mujo and Haso in the 2004 skit-comedy film Mujo & Haso Superstars.

He appeared in Bosnian television series Lud, zbunjen, normalan and Viza za budućnost, as well as series in neighboring Croatia such as Naša mala klinika, Kriza and Blago nama. He was also a judge on the Croatian televised singing competition Zvjezdice from 2015 to 2018.

== Early life ==
Enis Bešlagić was born in the northern Bosnian city of Doboj on 6 January 1975 while Bosnia was part of Yugoslavia. When the Bosnian War broke out in April 1992, 17-year-old Bešlagić escaped from his native town Tešanj to his aunts home in Germany. He was soon employed as a janitor for three months before working at a Munich cemetery as a gravedigger.

His paternal grandfather was Rešad Bešlagić, a folk singer popular in the era of the Kingdom of Yugoslavia. He was killed in 1945 during World War II in Sarajevo.

== Career ==
Bešlagić joined Alka Vuica, Luka Nižetić, and Vanna the judges panel of the Croatian children's televised singing competition Zvjezdice in September 2015 on RTL Television.

== Personal life ==
Enis is married to Sabina Bešlagić. They have two children; a daughter Asja and a son Mak. He is a fan of TOŠK Tešanj.

== Filmography ==
=== Films ===
- Fuse (2003)
- Summer in the Golden Valley (2003)
- Days and Hours (2004)
- Mujo i Haso Superstars (2004)
- Ram za sliku moje domovine (2005)
- Ivko's Feast (2005)
- All for Free (2006)
- Armin (2007)
- Duhovi Sarajeva (2007)
- Montevideo, God Bless You! (2010)
- Sabina K. (2015)
- Our Everyday Life (2015)

=== Television ===
- Warriors (1999; TV film)
- Nepitani (1999; TV film)
- Viza za budućnost (2003–08; 177 episodes)
- Crna hronika (2004; 1 episode)
- Super Billy (2004–07; animated series)
- Naša mala klinika (2004–07; 112 episodes)
- Gori vatra (2005; 1 episode)
- Sex i selo (2005; 1 episode)
- Praonica (2005; 1 episode)
- Lud, zbunjen, normalan (2007); 2 episodes)
- Cimmer fraj (2006–07; 64 episodes)
- Žene sa broja 13 (2009; 1 episode)
- Dva smo svijeta različita (2011; 1 episode)
- Stipe u gostima (2011; 1 episode)
- Montevideo, Bog te video! (2012–13; 4 episodes)
- Odmori se, zaslužio si (2013; 18 episodes)
- Kriza (2013–14; 24 episodes)
- Zvjezdice (2015–2018)
- Blago nama (2020–2022)
- Knjazalište (2023)

=== Short films ===
- Sindrom (1998)
- Čudan pazar (2000)
- 10 Minutes (2002)
- Ram za sliku moje domovine (2005)
