= ToMa =

Croatian singer

- Born: Tomislav Marić; 29 October 1997 (age 28); Livno, Bosnia and Herzegovina
- Genres: Pop; R&B
- Occupation: Singer
- Years active: 2013–present
- Label: Dallas Records

Tomislav Marić (born 29 October 1997), better known by his stage name ToMa, is a Croatian singer signed to Dallas Records. He began his career after participating in season three of The Voice Hrvatska. He rose to fame in 2021 after participating at Dora 2021 where he finished sixth.

== Music career ==
Marić notably performed at the Koševo City Stadium during Pope Francis' 2015 visit to Sarajevo.

In early 2017, Marić released his first single "Nije grijeh", a collaboration with Kristina Boban. Marić signed a record deal with Hit Records and released two singles under them, "Ljubiš, ali ne voliš" i "Noć za kraj". In 2020 he parted ways with Hit Records and signed a new deal with Dallas Records.

In December 2020, Marić was announced as one of the 14 finalists for Dora 2021, the national contest in Croatia to select the country's Eurovision Song Contest 2021 entry. He ranked sixth after performing the song "Ocean of Love" which was written by Adriana Pupavac, Andreas Björkman, Kalle Persson and Marić. "Ocean of Love" later baceme Marić's first song to chart on the HR Top 40 chart. A year later, on 17 December 2021, Marić was announced as one of the acts to perform at Dora 2022 with the song "In the Darkness". He once again competed on Dora, but this time in 2026 with the song "Ledina". He qualified for the final.

== Discography ==
=== Singles ===
Title	Year	Peak chart positions	Album
Title	Year	CRO	Album
"Nije grijeh" (with Kristina Boban)	2017	—	Non-album singles
"Ljubiš, ali ne voliš"	2018	—	Non-album singles
"Noć za kraj"	2019	—	Non-album singles
"Vrijeme je"	2020	—	Non-album singles
"Ocean of Love"	2021	13	Non-album singles
"Zaboravljeni"	2021	—	Non-album singles
"In the Darkness"	2022	—	Non-album singles
"193"	2023	8	Non-album singles
"—" denotes releases that did not chart or were not released in that territory.
