= Meri Andraković =

Croatian singer

- Born: 28 June 2000 (age 26); Osijek, Croatia
- Origin: Belišće, Croatia
- Genres: Pop
- Occupation: Singer
- Years active: 2015–present
- Label: Croatia Records

Meri Andraković (born 28 June 2000) is a Croatian singer. She rose to fame after participating in season one of RTL Televizija's Zvjezdice. In 2020 Andraković released her debut album Voli through Croatia Records. In 2023, she joined the band ET as lead singer.

== Life and career ==
Meri Andraković was born on 28 June 2000 in Osijek, Croatia and grew up in the nearby town of Belišće. She has been engaged in amateur singing since childhood.

In early 2015 she was announced as one of the participants in season one of RTL Televizija's Zvjezdice. She reached the top six before leaving the contest. Andraković's first single "Sve sam tebi oprostila ja" was released in 2016. In early 2018 she signed a record deal with Croatia Records. Since 2018 she has been collaborating with music producer Boris Đurđević. Andraković's debut album Voli was released on 3 December 2020.

On 9 December 2022, Andraković was announced as one of the 18 participants in Dora 2023, the national contest in Croatia to select the country's Eurovision Song Contest 2023 entry, with the song "Bye Bye Blonde".

== Discography ==
=== Albums ===
Title	Details	Peak chart positions
Title	Details	CRO
Voli	Released: 3 December 2020; Label: Croatia Records; Formats: CD, digital download, streaming	15

=== Singles ===
Title	Year	Peak chart positions	Album
Title	Year	CRO	Album
"Sve sam tebi oprostila ja	2016	—	non-album singles
"Nije kriva muzika"	2018	—	Voli
"To je ta ljubav"	2019	—	Voli
"Za malo ljubavi"	2019	—	Voli
"Nisi fer"	2019	—	Voli
"Zaboravi me"	2020	—	Voli
"Dodiri"	2020	—	Voli
"Sretan Božić"	2020	17	Voli
"Bilo je dobro"	2021	—	non-album singles
"Do zadnjeg udaha"	2022	—	non-album singles
"Briga me za sve"	2022	—	non-album singles
"Bye Bye Blonde"	2023	2	non-album singles
"Briga me za sve"	2023	23	non-album singles
