= Vanna (singer) =

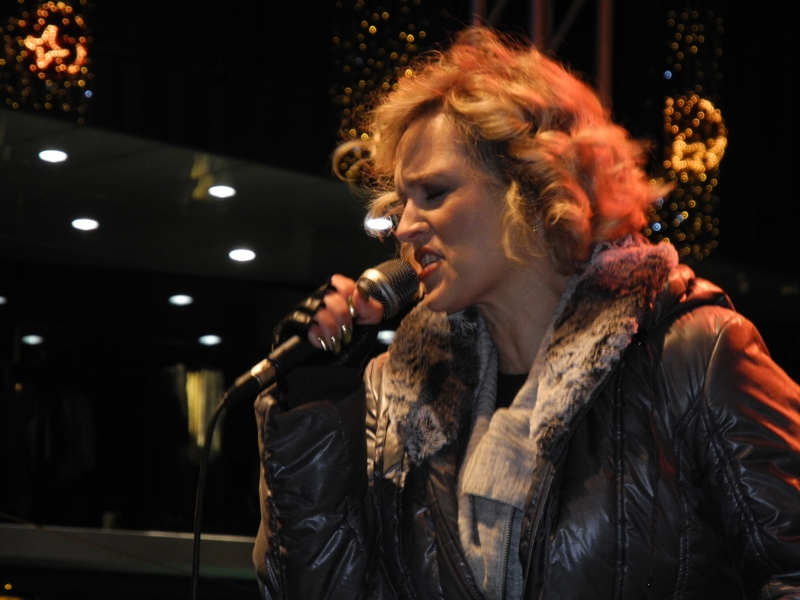
- Vanna in concert in 2012

Background information
- Born: Ivana Ranilović; 1 September 1970 (age 55); Koprivnica, SR Croatia, SFR Yugoslavia
- Origin: Zagreb, Croatia
- Genres: Pop-Rock
- Occupation: Singer
- Years active: 1990–present
- Label: Croatia Records
- Formerly of: Electro Team

Ivana Ranilović-Vrdoljak (born 1 September 1970 in Koprivnica, Croatia) better known by her stage name Vanna, is a Croatian pop singer.

== Biography ==
As a child, Vanna won prizes in various national children and youth festivals. Her debut was at the 1990 Zagrebfest, a music festival held in Zagreb. In that year she left her hometown to live and study in Zagreb and whilst studying, she performed in a band called BOA singing back vocals.

In 1992 her professional career as a singer started when she joined a eurodance band called Electro Team who started to perform as a hip hop and pop rap group and became instant stars. Not only was she a singer but also a co-author and songwriter of all the songs performed by Electro Team. The song "Tek je 12 sati" with which the group turned to a more eurodance sound became a huge hit in 1993, and was popular elsewhere across the former Yugoslavia republics.

In 1997, Vanna left Electro Team to start a solo career and record her first album, I to sam ja which brought her own versions of country, blues and jazz standards. As a solo artist she turned to more mature and urban europop and r′n′b with elements of pop rock in some songs. Her first author album "Ispod istog neba" mostly oriented to electronic r′n′b was published in 1998 and won two Porin awards for best female vocal and best vocal cooperation in duet "Ja ću budna sanjati" with singer songwriter Zlatan Stipišić Gibonni . She has since recorded three more solo albums and has won several other awards. She came first at Zadarfest (held in Zadar) three years in succession (1999, 2000 and 2001). Her album 24 sata which brought more faster europop songs was published in 2000. and reached gold..

In 2000., she came in second in Dora, the Croatian national competition for the Eurovision Song Contest with a song written by Bruno Kovačić and Ivana Plechinger. Being runner-up, she decided to participate again in 2001 and won with Strune ljubavi, a song by Tonči Huljić and Vjekoslava Huljić. Shortly after Dora, she gave birth to her daughter Jana. Vanna represented Croatia in the Eurovision Song Contest 2001 held in Copenhagen on 12th of May 2001 and finished 10th. She sang the song in Croatian and in English, now entitled "Strings of My Heart".

After Eurovision, Vanna released a live album called Vanna u Lisinskom published in 2001 and won Zadarfest again with the song "Više nisi moj". She won prizes in several other festivals. In 2003, her fourth album "Hrabra kao prije" was published and brought a more organic r′n′b oriented pop sound with more elements of pop rock. In the late 2000s and early 2010s, Vanna took a successful turn to more solid power pop and pop rock music with some acoustic ballads on albums "Ledeno doba" from 2007, and "Sjaj" from 2011, which proved that she can successfully sing any genre not just pop and dance music.

In 2012, she made a guest appearance on the track "Za tvoje oči" from the album Praštam of the Serbian rock band Neverne Bebe. After seven years of a discography hiatus, her last studio album "Izmješane boje" was published in 2019 and brought a return to pop, dance and r′n′b music and won a Porin award for pop album of the year.

Vanna is married to Andrija Vrdoljak, son of Croatian film director Antun Vrdoljak, and they have two children, Luka (born c. 1997.) and Jana (born c. 2001.). The family lives in Zagreb.

== Discography ==
- I to sam ja (1997)
- Ispod istog neba (1998)
- 24 sata (2000)
- Hrabra kao prije (2003)
- Ledeno doba (2007)
- Sjaj (2010)
- Izmiješane boje (2019)
- Dan po dan (2024)

| Preceded by Goran Karan with "Kad zaspu anđeli" | Croatia in the Eurovision Song Contest; 2001 | Succeeded by Vesna Pisarović with "Everything I Want" |
