= Tony Cetinski =

Croatian pop singer (born 1969)

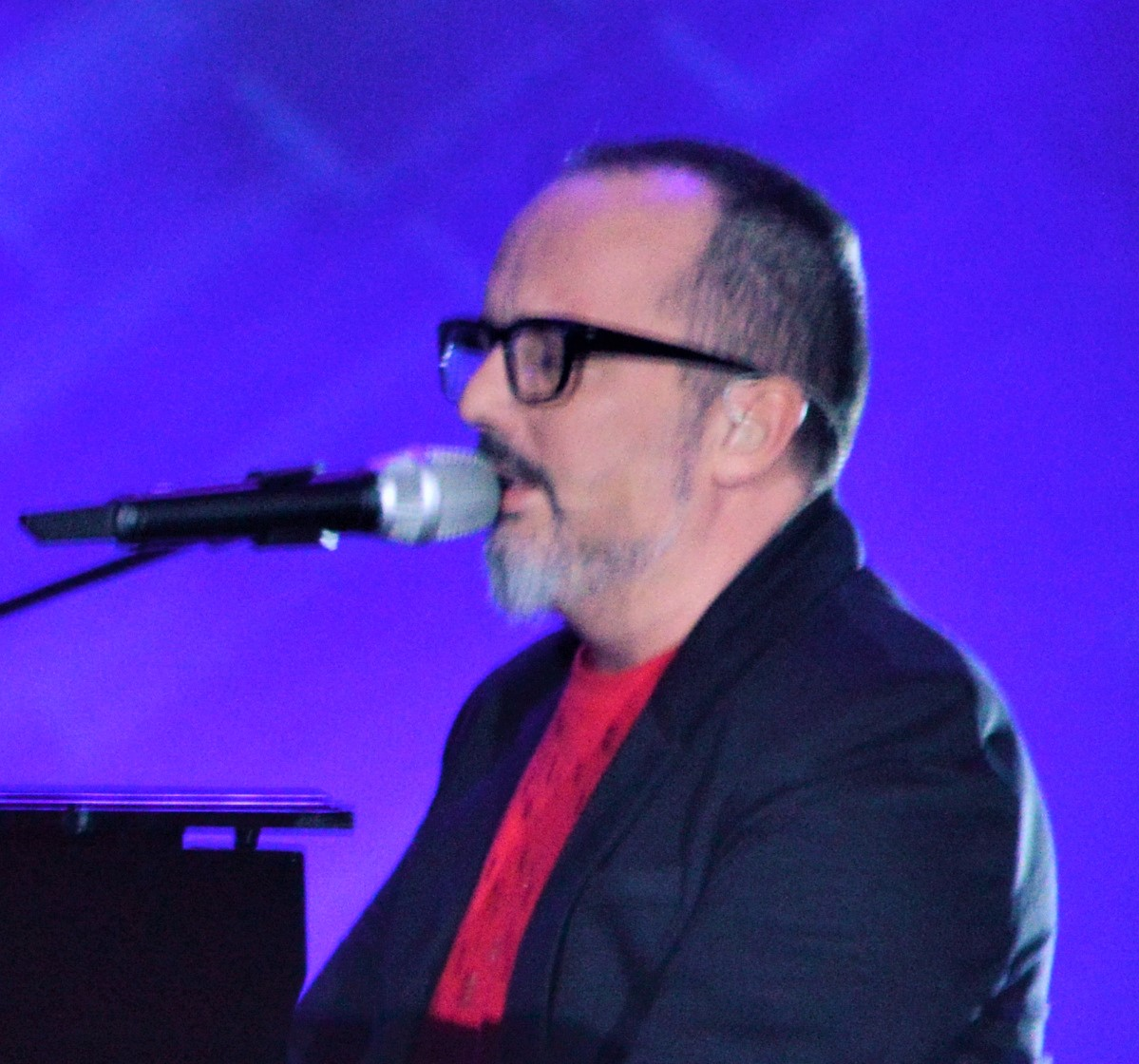
- Cetinski at the Slovenian national final for Eurovision in February 2017

Background information
- Born: Anthony Cetinski; 31 May 1969 (age 57); Pula, SR Croatia, SFR Yugoslavia
- Genres: Pop-rock; funk; disco; dance; pop
- Occupation: Singer-songwriter
- Instrument: Vocals
- Years active: 1990–present
- Labels: Suzy; Orfej; Scardona; Croatia Records; Cantus; Hit Records; Aquarius Records
- Spouse: Dubravka (m. 2014)

Anthony Cetinski (born 31 May 1969) is a Croatian pop singer.

== Biography ==
Born into a family of musicians in Pula (then SR Croatia, SFR Yugoslavia), Cetinski began singing when he was 15 years old with various local groups. He moved from Rovinj to Zagreb in 1991 to start his career, and quickly became one of Croatia's leading pop stars. In 1994, he represented Croatia at the Eurovision Song Contest with the song "Nek' ti bude ljubav sva".

At the 10th Croatian Radio Festival in 2006, Cetinski won all three prizes in pop-rock category: HRF Grand Prix – pop-rock, Listener's award and Music Editors award. He also recorded the song "Lagala nas mala" as a duet with Macedonian singer Toše Proeski. This song appears on both of Proeski's 2005 albums, Po tebe and its Croatian edition Pratim te. The song was also remixed by DeeJay Time.

In 2009, Cetinski won the Porin award for best male vocal performance with his song "Ako to se zove ljubav". Cetinski sold out two concerts in Arena Zagreb the same year with more than 30,000 people attending.

== Personal life ==
Tony is married to Dubravka. He is a devout Roman Catholic.

== Discography ==
- Samo srce ne laže (1990)
- Ljubomora I (1992)
- Ljubomora II (1993)
- Ljubav i bol (1995)
- Prah i pepeo (1996)
- A1 (1998)
- Triptonyc (2000)
- A sada... (2003)
- Budi uz mene (2005)
- Ako to se zove ljubav (2008)
- Da Capo (2010)
- Best of Tony Cetinski (2011)
- Opet si pobijedila (2012)
- Kao u snu (2018)

Achievements
Preceded by Put with "Don't Ever Cry"	Croatia in the Eurovision Song Contest; 1994	Succeeded by Magazin & Lidija with "Nostalgija"
