= Nenad =

- Pronunciation: Serbo-Croatian pronunciation: [něnad]
- Gender: male

Origin
- Origin: Slavic
- Meaning: unexpected, surprise

Other names
- Related names: Neša, Nešo, Nebojša, Nemanja, Neno

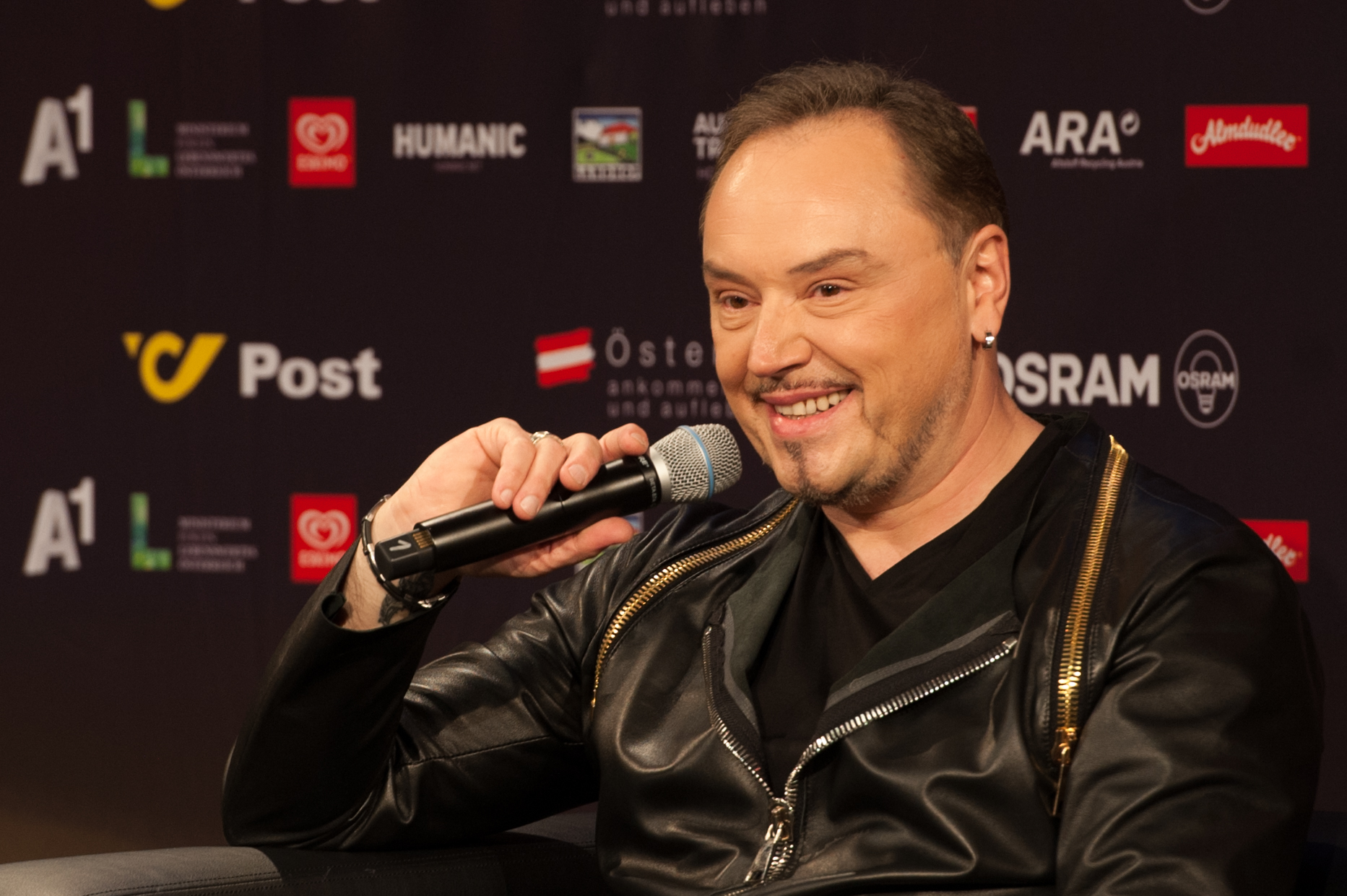
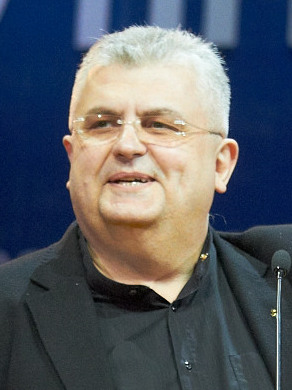
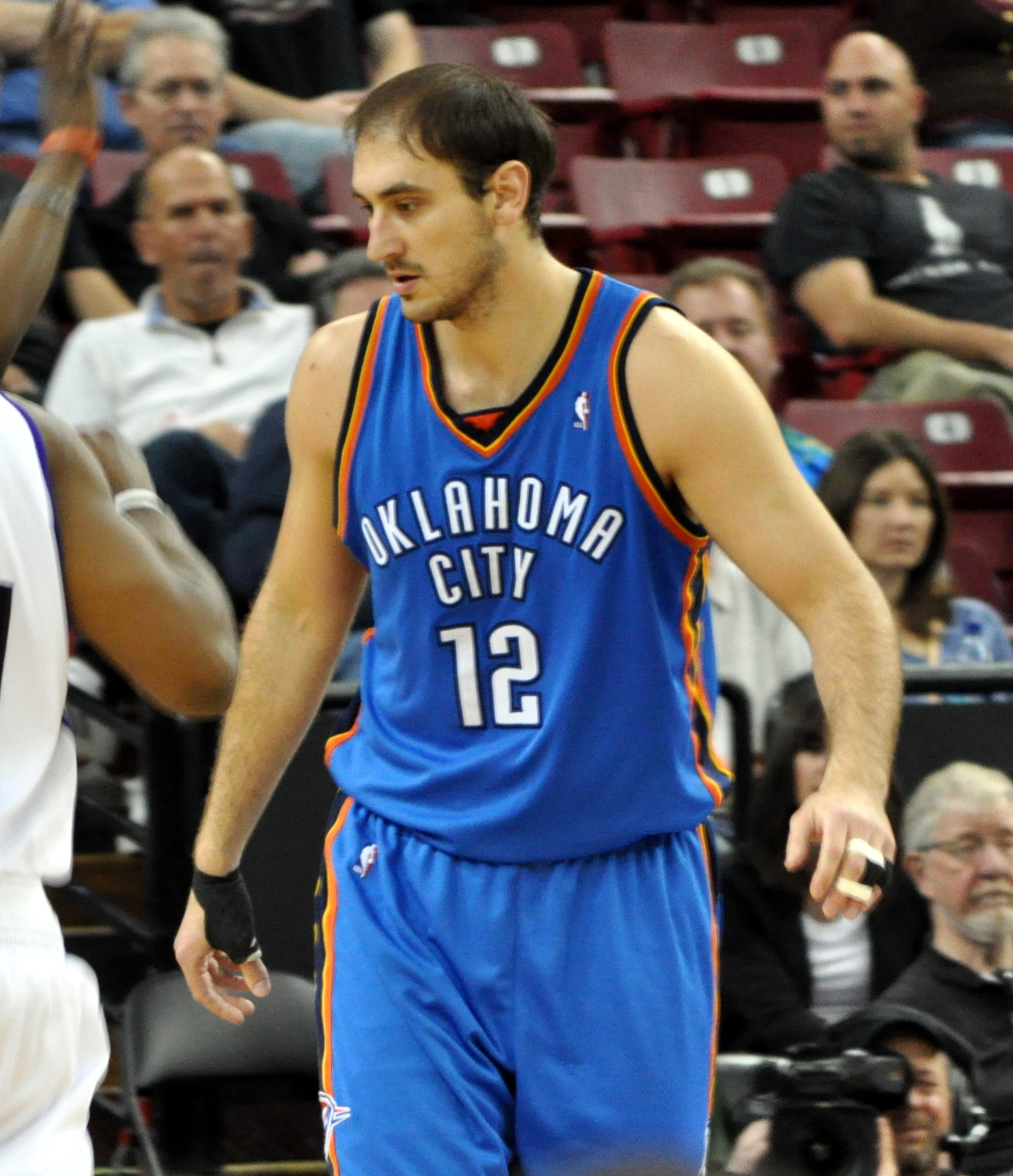
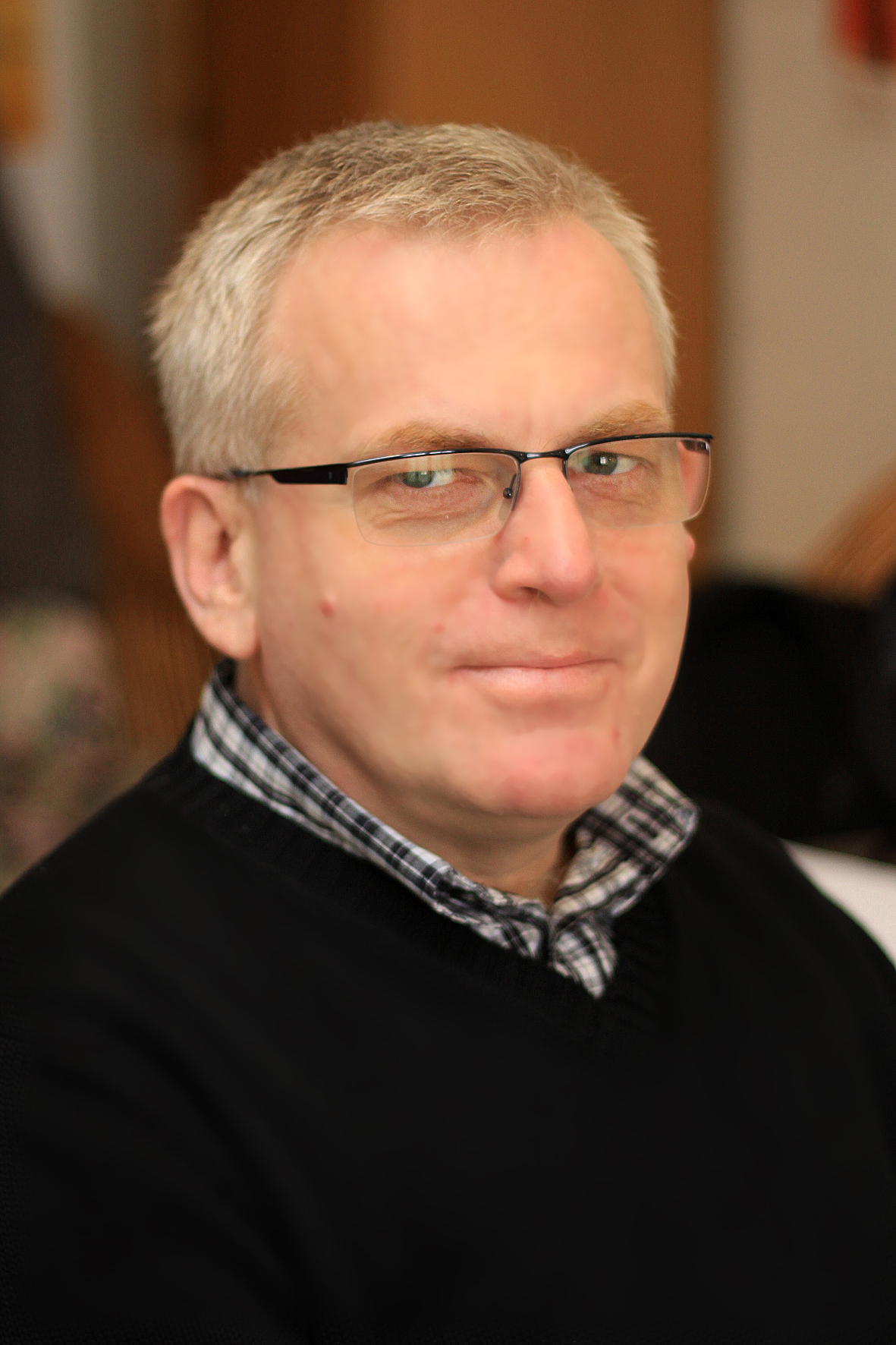
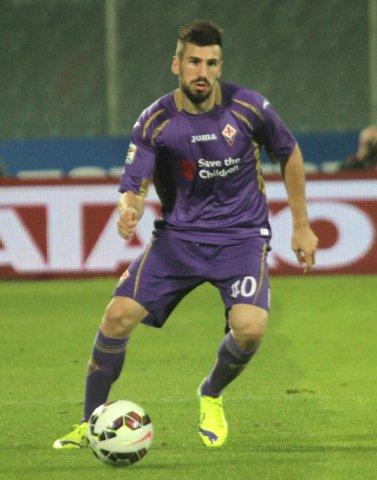
Nenad Knežević Knez, Nenad Čanak, Nenad Krstić, Nenad Firšt, Nenad Tomović

Nenad (Serbo-Croatian pronunciation: [něnad]; Cyrillic script: Ненад) is a masculine given name of Slavic origin. It is common in countries that speak South Slavic languages, especially in Bosnia and Herzegovina, Croatia, Serbia, and Montenegro. The name is derived from the word nenadan, which means "unexpected".

This name is often given to the younger of twins, in this case usually paired with the name Predrag, from the Serbian folk song "Predrag i Nenad".

== Notable people with the name ==
=== A-J ===
- Nenad Adamović (born 1989), Serbian footballer
- Nenad Babović (born 1976), Serbian rower
- Nenad Bach (born 1954), Croatian-American composer
- Nenad Ban (born 1966), Croatian biochemist
- Nenad Baroš (born 1986), Serbia politician
- Nenad Baćina (born 1971) is a Croatian football manager
- Nenad Begović (born 1980), Serbian footballer
- Nenad Beđik (born 1989), Serbian rower
- Nenad Bijedić (1959–2011), Bosnian-Turkish football player and manager
- Nenad Bilbija (born 1984), Slovenian handball player
- Nenad Bjeković (footballer born 1974), Serbian footballer
- Nenad Bjeković (born 1947), Serbian football administrator and former player
- Nenad Bjelica (born 1971), Croatian football player and coach
- Nenad Bogdanović (1954–2007), Serbian politician, former mayor of Belgrade
- Nenad Borović (born 1964), Serbian politician
- Nenad Borovčanin (born 1979), Serbian boxer
- Nenad Božić (born 1971), Serbian politician
- Nenad Brnović (born 1980), Montenegrin footballer
- Nenad Buljan (born 1978), Croatian swimmer
- Nenad Čanak (basketball) (born 1976), Serbian basketball player and coach
- Nenad Čanak (born 1959), Serbian politician
- Nenad Ćirković (born 1973), Serbian footballer
- Nenad Cvetković, multiple people
- Nenad Dedić (born 1990), Croatian footballer
- Nenad Delić (born 1984), Croatian basketball player
- Nenad Dimitrijević (born 1998), Macedonian basketball player
- Nenad Dizdarević (born 1955), Bosnian film director, screenwriter and producer
- Nenad Đorđević (born 1979), Serbian footballer
- Nenad Đukanović (born 1971), Serbian footballer
- Nenad Đurović (born 1986), Montenegrin footballer
- Nenad Đurđević (born 1987), Serbian footballer
- Nenad Džodić (born 1977), Serbian footballer
- Nenad Erić (born 1982), Serbian-Kazakh footballer
- Nenad Filipović (footballer) (born 1987), Serbian footballer
- Nenad Filipović (racewalker) (born 1978), Serbian racewalker
- Nenad Firšt (born 1964), Slovene composer, conductor and violinist
- Nenad Gagro (born 1975), Bosnian footballer
- Nenad Gajić (born 1983), Serbian-Canadian lacrosse player
- Nenad Gavrić (born 1991), Serbian footballer
- Nenad Gračan (born 1962), Croatian football player and manager
- Nenad Grozdić (born 1974), Serbian footballer
- Nenad Injac (born 1985), Serbian footballer
- Nenad Ivanković (born M1948), Croatian author, journalist and politician
- Nenad Jakovljević (born 1988), Serbian professional basketball coach
- Nenad Jakšić (born 1965), Serbian footballer
- Nenad Janković (born 1962), Bosnian Serb musician, composer and actor
- Nenad Jestrović (born 1976), Serbian footballer
- Nenad Jezdić (born 1972), Serbian actor
- Nenad Joldeski, Macedonian writer
- Nenad Jovanović (footballer, born 1979), Austrian-Serbian footballer
- Nenad Jovanović (footballer, born 1988), Serbian footballer
- Nenad M. Jovanovich (born 1974), Serbian Orthodox deacon

=== K-P ===
- Nenad Kecmanović (born 1947), Bosnian Serb political scientist and sociologist
- Nenad Kiso (born 1989), Bosnian footballer
- Nenad Kitanović (born 11 June 1968), Serbian politician
- Nenad Kljaić (born 1966), Croatian handball player and coach
- Nenad Knežević Knez (born 1967), Montenegrin singer
- Nenad Kovačević (born 1980), Serbian footballer
- Nenad Kočović (born 1995), Serbian footballer
- Nenad Krstić (politician) (born 1980), Serbian politician
- Nenad Krstić (born 1983), Serbian basketball player
- Nenad Krstičić (born 1990), Serbian footballer
- Nenad "Ned" Kuruc, Canadian politician
- Nenad Lalatović (born 1977), Serbian professional football player and manager
- Nenad Lalović (born 1958), Serbian businessman
- Nenad Lazarevski (born 1986), Serbian-Macedonian footballer
- Nenad Lončar (born, 1981), Serbian hurdler
- Nenad Lukić (born 1992), Serbian footballer
- Nenad Lukić (1968–2014), Serbian footballer
- Nenad Maksić (born 1972), Serbian handball player and coach
- Nenad Manojlović (1954–2014), Serbian water polo player
- Nenad Marinković (born 1988), Serbian footballer
- Nenad Marjanović, Croatian musician
- Nenad Marković (born 1968), Bosnian footballer
- Nenad Maslovar (born 1967), Montenegrin footballer
- Nenad Medić (born 1982), Serbian-Canadian poker player
- Nenad Medvidović, American computer scientist and university professor
- Nenad Mijatović (born 1987), Montenegrin basketball player
- Nenad Milenković (born 1972), Serbian politician
- Nenad Milijaš (born 1983), Serbian footballer
- Nenad Miljenović (born 1993), Serbian basketball player
- Nenad Milojičić (born 1978), Serbian politician
- Nenad Milosavljević (born 1954), Serbian singer and songwriter
- Nenad Milovanović (born 1969), Serbian football manager
- Nenad Miloš (born 1955), Serbian-Croatian swimmer
- Nenad Mirosavljević (born 1977), Serbian footballer
- Nenad Mitrović, multiple people
- Nenad Mišanović (born 1984), Serbian basketball player
- Nenad Mišković (born 1975), Bosnian Serb footballer
- Nenad Mišović, Serbian-Swedish criminal
- Nenad Mladenović (born 1976), Serbian footballer
- Nenad Nastić (born 1981), Serbian footballer
- Nenad Nedeljković (born 1986), Serbian footballer
- Nenad Nenadović (1964– 2021), Serbian actor and television host
- Nenad Nerandžić (born 1996), Serbian basketball player
- Nenad Nešić (born 1978), Bosnian Serb politician
- Nenad Nikolić, several people
- Nenad Nonković (born 1970), Serbian footballer
- Nenad Novaković (born 1982), Serbian footballer
- Nenad Okanović (born 1980), Serbian actor
- Nenad Pagonis (born 1987), Serbian kickboxer
- Nenad Panić (born 1984), Serbian footballer
- Nenad Peruničić (born 1971), Serbian handball player and coach
- Nenad Petrović (chess problemist) (born 1907–1989), Croatian chess player
- Nenad Petrović (writer) (1925–2014), Serbian writer
- Nenad Polimac (born 1949), Croatian film critic
- Nenad Popović (born 1966), Bosnian Serb politician and businessman
- Nenad Pralija (born 1970), Croatian footballer
- Nenad Prodanović (born 1954), Bosnian bobsledder
- Nenad Prokić, Serbian playwright, theatre director and politician
- Nenad Protega (born 1969), Slovenian footballer
- Nenad Puhovski (born 1949), Croatian film director and producer
- Nenad Puljezević (born 1973), Serbian-Hungarian handball player

=== R-Z ===
- Nenad Radonjić (born 1996), Serbian footballer
- Nenad Radosavljević (born 1961), Kosovo Serb politician, administrator, and media owner
- Nenad Radulović (1959–1990), Serbian musician, songwriter and actor
- Nenad Rajić (born 1982), Serbian footballer
- Nenad Rašić (born 1973), Kosovo Serb politician
- Nenad Sakić (born 1971), Serbian football player and coach
- Nenad Šalov (born 1955), Croatian footballer
- Nenad Šarić (1947–2012), Croatian musician
- Nenad Savić (born 1981), Serbian footballer
- Nenad Sestan (born 1970), Croatian neuroscientist
- Nenad Sević (born 1996), Serbian footballer
- Nenad Simić (born 1984), Serbian footballer
- Nenad Šljivić (born 1985), Serbian footballer
- Nenad Šoštarić (born 1959), Croatian handball player and coach
- Nenad Srećković (born 1988), Serbian footballer
- Nenad Stamenković (born 1977), Serbian footballer
- Nenad Stankov (born 1992), Macedonian basketball player
- Nenad Starovlah (born 1955), Bosnian footballer
- Nenad Stavrić (1963–2007), Serbian footballer
- Nenad Stefanović (born 1985), Serbian basketball player and coach
- Nenad Stekić (1951–2021), Serbian long jumper
- Nenad Stevandić (born 1966), Bosnian Serb politician
- Nenad Stojaković (born 1980), Serbian footballer
- Nenad Stojanović (born 1979), Serbian footballer
- Nenad Stojković (born 1956), Serbian footballer
- Nenad Studen (born 1979), Bosnian footballer
- Nenad Sudarov (born 1975), Serbian triathlete
- Nenad Šulović (born 1985), Serbian basketball player
- Nenad Todorović (born 1982), Serbian footballer
- Nenad Tomović (born 1987), Serbian footballer
- Nenad Trajković (basketball) (born 1961), Serbian basketball coach
- Nenad Trajković (poet) (born 1982), Serbian poet, essayist and literary critic
- Nenad Trinajstić (1936–2021), Croatian chemist
- Nenad Trpovski (born 1978), Macedonian slalom canoer
- Nenad Trunić (born 1968), Serbian professor of basketball
- Nenad Vanić (born 1970), Serbian footballer
- Nenad Vasilić (born 1975), Serbian bassist
- Nenad Vasić (born 1979), Serbian footballer
- Nenad Veličković (born 1962), Bosnian playwright
- Nenad Veselji (born 1971), Maltese-Yugoslav footballer
- Nenad Vidaković (born 1957), Bosnian footballer
- Nenad Vidović (born 1939), Yugoslav gymnast
- Nenad Višnjić (born 1983), Serbian footballer
- Nenad Vorih (born 1963), Croatian artist
- Nenad Vučinić (born 1965), Serbian basketball coach
- Nenad Vučković (footballer) (born 1976), Croatian footballer
- Nenad Vučković (handballer) (born 1980), Serbian handball player
- Nenad Vujić (born 1966), Serbian politician
- Nenad Vukanić (born 1974), Montenegrin water polo player
- Nenad Vukasović (born 1952), Serbian politician and lawyer
- Nenad Vukčević (born 1974), Montenegrin football player and manager
- Nenad Zečević (born 1978), Serbian footballer
- Nenad Zimonjić (born 1976), Serbian tennis player
- Nenad Zivčević (born 1986), Macedonian-Serbian basketball player
- Nenad Živanović (born 1980), Serbian footballer
- Nenad Živković (born 1989), Serbian footballer
- Nenad Žvanut (born 1962), Croatian speed skater

== See also ==
- Nenadović, a surname
