= Stamenković =

Stamenković (Cyrillic script: Стаменковић) is a Serbian patronymic surname derived from a masculine given name Stamenko. It may refer to:

- Dejan Stamenković (born 1983), footballer
- Dejan Stamenković (born 1990), footballer
- Dragoljub Stamenković (1954–2025), politician
- Ljubiša Stamenković (born 1964), football coach
- Nenad Stamenković (born 1977), footballer
- Predrag Stamenković (born 1977), footballer
- Saša Stamenković (born 1985), football goalkeeper
- Srboljub Stamenković (1956–1996), footballer
