= Bukovački Salaši =

Bukovački Salaši Буковачки Салаши (Serbian)
- Neighborhood
- Interactive map of Bukovački Salaši
- Country: Serbia
- Province: Vojvodina
- Time zone: UTC+1 (CET)
  - Summer (DST): UTC+2 (CEST)

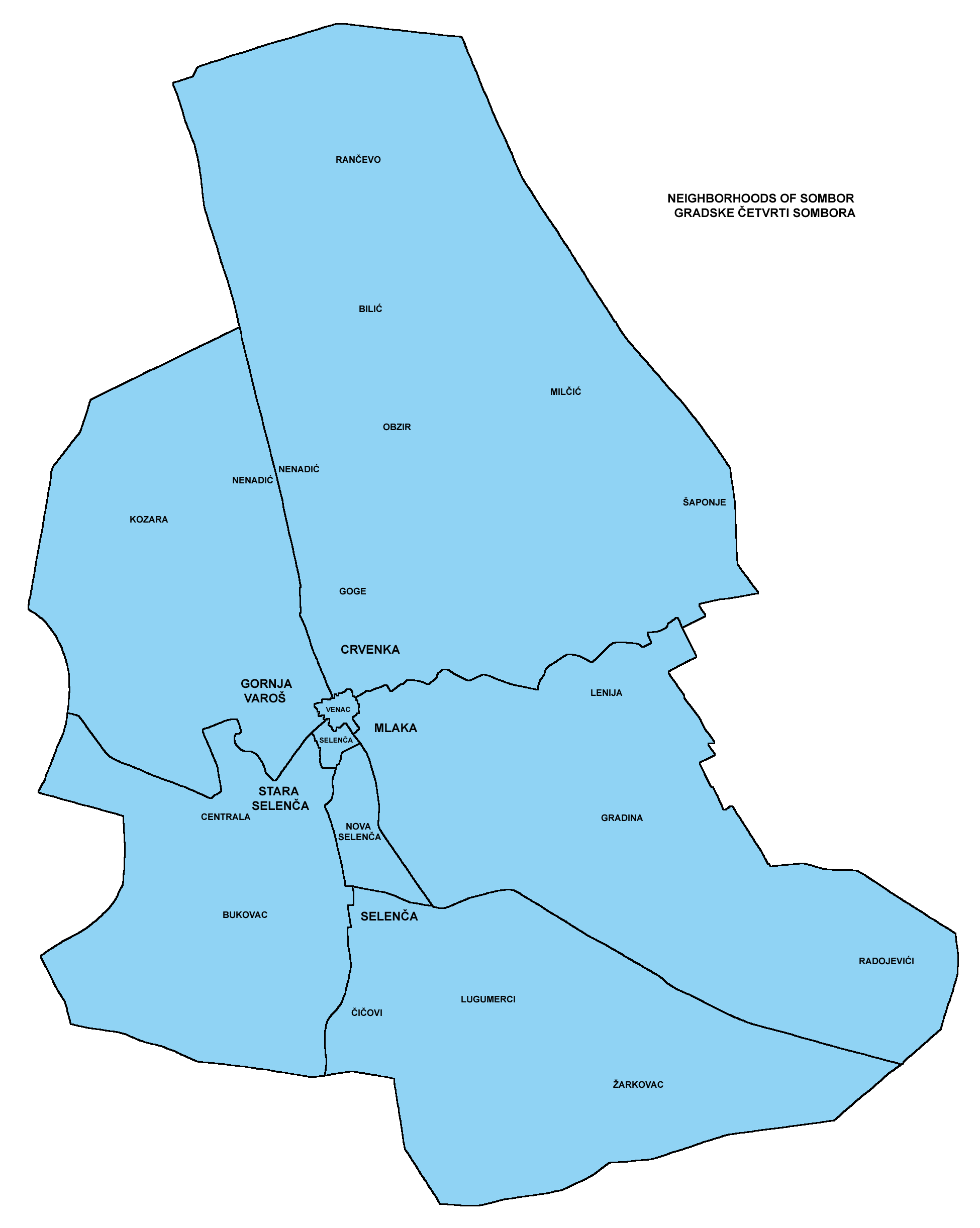
Neighborhoods of urban Sombor

Bukovački Salaši (Serbian Cyrillic: Буковачки Салаши), also known as Bukovac (Serbian Cyrillic: Буковац), is a suburb of Sombor, a city in Serbia.

== Geography ==
It is situated between the Veliki Bački Kanal (Great Bačka Canal) in the north, Mostonga river in the east, railway Sombor-Bukovac-Prigrevica in the south, and Centrala, another suburb of Sombor, in the west.

Bukovački Salaši (plural in Serbian) are divided into: Centar Bukovac, Kovačići, Lazići, Zečevi, Janjatovići, Karalići, and Dedići. Each of these parts of the settlement (except Centar Bukovac) is composed of several farms (salaši in Serbian), and is named after the first family that built farm in that area.

Centar Bukovac is a central part of the settlement and it is located around the local road that is 3.5 kilometres long.

== Population ==
In 1978, the population of Bukovački Salaši numbered 192 houses, of which 5 in Kovačići, 11 in Lazići, 5 in Zečevi, 4 in Janjatovići, 7 in Karalići, and 160 in Centar Bukovac. Part of the settlement known as Dedići was uninhabited in that time.

In 1978, population of Bukovački Salaši included 46 families with surname Mijić, 12 with surname Lazić, 2 with surname Kovačić, 10 with surname Dedić, 6 with surname Čonić, 2 with surname Janjatović, 1 with surname Lutkić, and 13 with surname Karalić. These families lived in the settlement in 1748 too.

== History ==
Settlement was founded in 1728 by the Serb frontiersmen. From its foundation until the present day, the population of the settlement was almost entirely composed of ethnic Serbs. In 1759, population of the settlement numbered 28 houses.

== See also ==
- Sombor
- List of places in Serbia
- List of cities, towns and villages in Vojvodina
