= Dejan Stamenković =

Dejan Stamenković may refer to:

- Dejan Stamenković (footballer, born 1983), Serbian association football player who plays for Kolubara
- Dejan Stamenković (footballer, born 1990), Serbian association football player
