= Mijić =

Mijić is a surname. Notable people with the surname include:

- Ana Mijic, Serbian hydrologist
- Dušan Mijić (born 1953), Serbian publisher and political figure
- Dušan Mijić (born 1965), Bosnian Serb football coach and player
- Karlo Mijić (1887–1964), Yugoslav painter
- Marjan Mijić, former member of Serbian progressive metal band Draconic
- Miloš Mijić (born 1989), Serbian football player
- Predrag Mijić (born 1970), Serbian politician
- Predrag Mijić (footballer) (born 1984), Serbian footballer
- Snježana Mijić (born 1971), Croatian volleyball player
- Vasa Mijić (born 1973), Serbian volleyball player
