= Nenadović =

Serbian surname

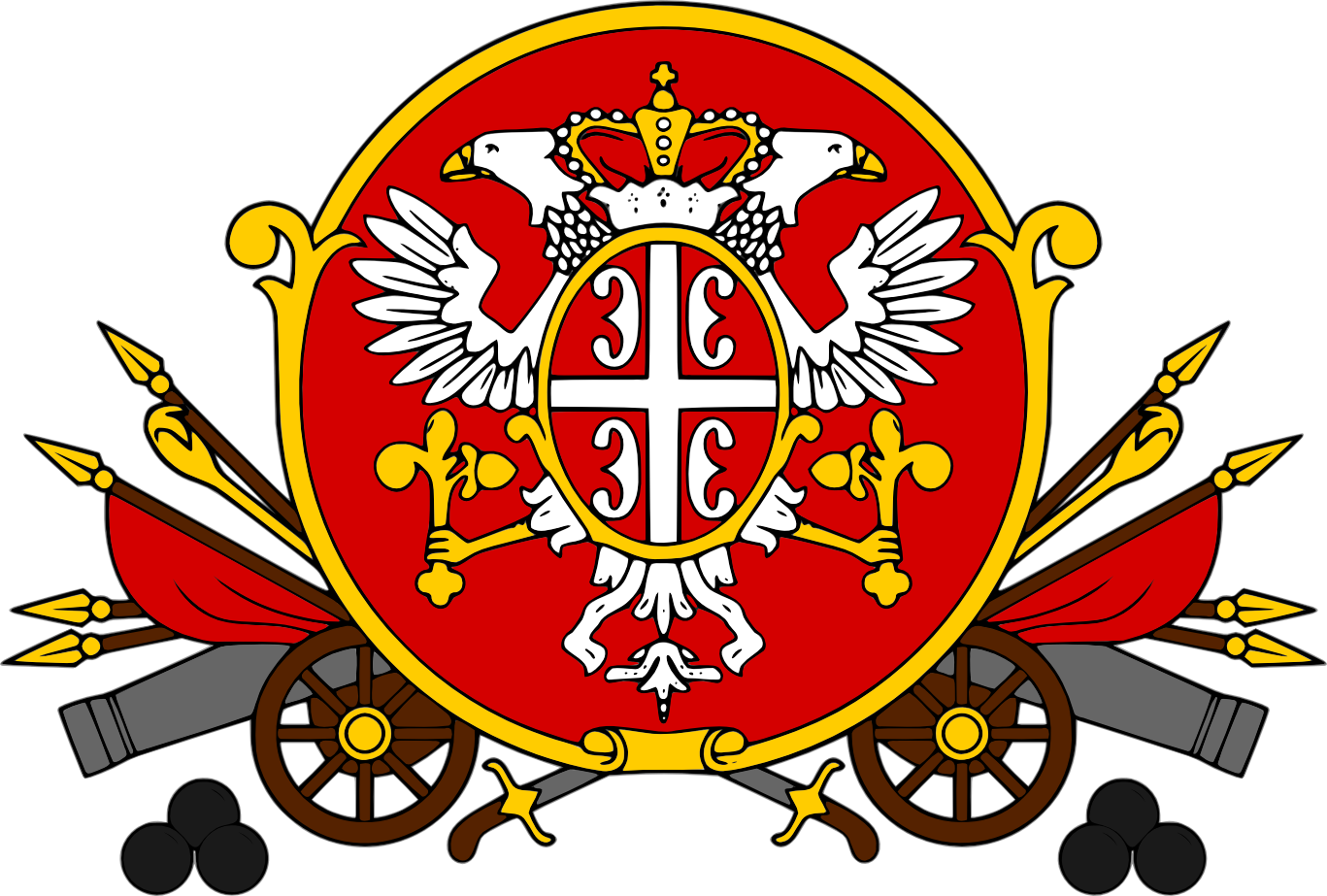
Coat of arms of the Jakov Nenadović

Nenadović (Cyrillic script: Ненадовић) is a Serbian surname, derived from a masculine given name Nenad. It may refer to:

- Aleksa Nenadović (1749–1804), Serbian Archpriest
- Alexander Nenadović (1815–1881), Serbian politician
- Djordje Nenadović (1935–2019), Serbian actor
- Jakov Nenadović (1765–1836), Serbian Duke and revolutionary politician
- Jevrem Nenadović (1793–1867), Serbian politician
- Konstantin Nenadović (1822–1900), Serbian historian
- Ljubomir Nenadović (1826–1859), Serbian writer, poet, translator, diplomat and politician
- Mateja Nenadović (1777–1854), Serbian Archpriest and Prime minister
- Miroslav Nenadović (1904–1989), engineer and professor at the Faculty of Mechanical Engineering in Belgrade
- Nenad Nenadović (1964–2021), Serbian actor
- Pavle Nenadović (1703–1768), Serbian Orthodox Archbishop
- Persida Nenadović (1813–1873), Princess Consort of Serbia
- Rafailo Nenadović (1752–1804), birth name of Serbian abbott Hadži-Ruvim
- Sima Nenadović (1793–1815), Serbian voivode in the Second Serbian Uprising
- Sophie Nenadovic (born 1998), Australian soccer player
- Stefan Nenadović (born 1991), Montenegrin footballer
- Uroš Nenadović (born 1994), Serbian footballer
