= Predrag Mijić =

Predrag Mijić may refer to:

- Predrag Mijić (footballer)
- Predrag Mijić (politician)
