= Dedić =

Dedić (Serbian Cyrillic: Дедић), is a surname of Slavic origin, which is a common surname in most of the South Slav nations, but it is also found in the United States, Austria, Germany and Switzerland. The first record of the surname Dedić dates back to 1569 where it was recorded in the "Book of the Baptized of the city of Rab", thus belonging to the group of the oldest surnames in the city of Rab, Croatia. The meaning of the surname is successor, duke, or tribal leader.

People with the surname Dedić:

A

- Amar Dedić (born 2002), Bosnian footballer
- Amira Medunjanin née Dedić (born 1972), Bosnian singer
- Anel Dedić (born 1991), Bosnian footballer
- Arnel Dedić (born 1976), Croatian basketball player
- Arsen Dedić (1938–2015), Croatian singer-songwriter

F

- Faruk Dedić (born 1971), Bosnian football manager

J

- Josef Dědič (1924–1992), Czechoslovak figure skater and sport official

N

- Nenad Dedić (born 1990), Croatian footballer who plays for Zavrč in the Slovenian PrvaLiga

M

- Matija Dedić – Croatian jazz pianist and composer
- Milutin Dedić – Serbian academic painter
- Miraš Dedeić (born 1938), Montenegrin former head of the Montenegrin Orthodox Church
- Mirela Dedic (born 1991), Austrian handballer who plays for the national team
- Mirsad Dedić (born 1968), Bosnian footballer

R

- René Dedič (born 1993), Slovak footballer
- Rusmin Dedić (born 1982), former Slovenian footballer who played as a defender

S

- Slavko Dedić (born 1979), Montenegrin chess player

W

- Wolfgang Dedic – former German football player

Z

- Zlatko Dedič (born 1984), Slovenian football forward who currently plays for the Slovenia national football team.
