= Nenad Šarić =

Croatian musician

Nenad Šarić Brada (10 October 1947 in Rijeka, Yugoslavia – 3 May 2012 in Karlovac, Croatia) was a Croatian musician, best known as the drummer of Novi Fosili.

== Biography ==
Šarić began with music from elementary school and became a drummer with Jutarnje zvijezde (Morning stars). Until 1985, he performed with Oliver Dragojević among others.

== Death ==
Šarić died on 3 May 2012, aged 64, from complications of a stroke.

== Marriage ==
For almost 20 years, he was married to Sanja Doležal, lead singer of the group Novi Fosili.

== See also ==
- Novi fosili
- Sanja Doležal
