= Nenad Nikolić =

Nenad Nikolić may refer to:

- Nenad Nikolić (footballer, born 1959), Croatian football coach and former player who has worked in Iran
- Nenad Nikolić (footballer, born 1961), Serbian left-back
- Nenad Nikolić (footballer, born 1984), Serbian who played in Canada
