= Novi fosili =

Croatian pop band

Novi Fosili
- Group members from 1981 left to right; Rajko Dujmić, Slobodan Momčilović, Đurđica Barlović, Marinko Colnago and Vladimir Kočiš

Background information
- Also known as: The New Fossils
- Genres: Pop; Pop rock
- Years active: 1969–1991; 1992–2001; 2005–2024
- Labels: Jugoton; Croatia Records
- Members: Vladimir Kočiš Zec; Sanja Doležal
- Past members: Đurđica Barlović; Marinko Colnago; Nenad Šarić; Rajko Dujmić; Jelena Fošner; Vladimir Pavelić; Nataša Belšović; Slobodan Momčilović

Novi Fosili (English: The New Fossils) is a Croatian pop band, one of the most popular music acts in the former Yugoslavia.

The group was a phenomenon of Yugoslavian pop music from late 70s until late 80s when they were at the peak of their fame, and were compared to ABBA because of their bright and fun songs with sing-along choruses and contemporary arrangements.

As a group, they released 29 albums (16 studio albums and 13 compilation albums), which have sold millions of copies and they are considered one of the best selling musicians in former Yugoslavia.

== History ==
=== Forming and naming (1969–1977) ===
The group was formed in Zagreb in 1969, when the drummer Slobodan Momčilović, who, after many years in the supporting bands of famous music stars of the time, invited his bassist (from then at the time band: "Kennedy Boys") Marinko Colnago, to join the new band. The name "Novi" in the name "fosili" was suggested by Arsen Dedić. In the Junferici pastry shop on Teslina Street, a well-known gathering place for musicians until the end of the 70s, they were discussing the name of the band. "The two of us were 27, 28 years old, our saxophonist Kinko 38, and we joked that we were as old as fossils to start a band. Arsen Dedić was listening to us from the other side of the bar, who said: - Then call yourselves Novi Fosili. ". Along with Momčilović and Colnago, the original line-up also included keyboardist Slavomir Cvija and guitarist Milan Čale Čale, and they left behind 13 singles and one LP from 1974, simply called “Novi fosili”. At the turn of 1976 and 1977, the band, along with guitarist Zoran Vlaović, was joined by 22-year-old Rajko Dujmić. That same year, Novi Fosili played at the Split Festival, where their song "Diridonda" soon became a hit throughout the country. Their next several albums sold millions of copies and delivered many hits that are still aired on radios in Croatia today.

=== Novi fosili with Đurđica Barlović (1977–1982) ===
After several unsuccessful attempts with female vocalists, in 1976, the band was finally joined by a young singer from Split, Đurđica Barlović, with experience she had gained singing in the group "Batali". She was a student of construction school in Split, and was more interested in music. She took piano and guitar lessons by Croatian composer Đeki Srbljenović. In May 1977, Vladimir Kočiš Zec joined the band instead of Vlaović, although not everything went smoothly: - “Marinko, Moka and Rajko invited me to a café because they needed a singer and guitarist. I flatly refused their offer because they were known as a ‘corny band’. They had the hit ‘Sjedi, Ćiro, navrh grane’ and such nonsense, but, I needed money for my family and after a week I called them and confirmed that I was coming”, recalls Zec.

The first major successes came in 1976, At the Split Festival, they performed "Diridonda", which became a hit throughout Yugoslavia, after the collaboration with Zdenko Runjić, later - "Tko visoko diže nos" by composer Andrej Baša from Zagrebfest followed, on the B-side of which, despite the protests of Jugoton editors, Dujmić's "Sanjaj me" ("Dream of me") was founded, co-authored with Dea Volarić. In 1978, they released second album and first album with Đurđica Barilović as main vocalist: Da te ne volim ("That I don't love you"). The homonymous song from the album Da te ne volim has sold in 65,000 copies, while the album has reached the circulation of 170,000 copies. Dujmić, along with a number of collaborators, is responsible for the band's string of hits, from "Sanjaj me" ("Dream of me") to "Da te ne volim" ("That I don't love you"), "Najdraže moje" ("My dearest"), to "Šuti moj dječače plavi" ("Be quiet, my blue boy"), "Tonka" and others, earning the band comparisons to the Swedish ABBA. In 1980 they released the third album titled Nedovršene priče ("Unfinished stories"), with hits like: "Nikad više staro vino” (“Never again old wine”), “Šuti moj dječače plavi” (“Be quiet, my blue boy”). They also had notable performances at foreign competitions in Dresden and Bratislava. They became one of the most popular bands in the former country, and were chosen as the band of the year on several occasions. Their concert repertoire consists exclusively of their own songs, mostly by Dujmić. During that time, they released about 15 singles and 6 LPs. This was followed by tours of the then Soviet Union, United States of America, Canada and the countries of Europe.

In 1981, they released the album Budi uvijek blizu ("Always be close"), which has sold over 712,000 copies and is one of the best selling albums in Yugoslavia, with most popular songs; "Plava košulja" ("Blue shirt"), "E, moj Saša" ("Oh my Saša"), "Tonka", "Ključ je ispod otirača" ("The key is under the doormat"), which became band's to-day biggest hits and ultimately the biggest hits of Yugoslavia in the 80s. The following year in 1982, they released the last album with Đurđica Barlović as the lead singer titled Za djecu i odrasle ("For children and adults"). The album has sold in 200,000 units and after that album Đurđica decided to leave the group as her life, of a pop star, under the constant eye of the public, with numerous performances and tours, no longer attracted her. She decided to dedicate herself to her family, husband and sons.

"Đurđica left us when she wanted to sort out her family life, because we were working at a crazy pace. Her family was more important to her than us, more important than any performances or money. She was born to be a mother, a wife, and yet – on the other hand – she was also a top-notch singer, and what a singer! We never canceled a concert because of her, her voice never 'cracked'. She was strong and in stable health. That's why I was surprised by her premature departure. The day she died, believe it or not, all the clocks in my apartment stopped. Later I heard the sad news..."

— Rajko Dujmić after Đurđica's death

Her place in "Fosili" was replaced by a new singer, Sanja Doležal. However, Đurđica did not completely give up singing, she had a solid solo career, performed occasionally at festivals and recorded records. From 1984 to 1988, she released four albums. She was a guest on the 1988 album Nebeske kočije ("Heavenly Chariots"), where she sang backing vocals on all the songs.

On 26 August 1992, Đurđica Barlović died in a Zadar hospital, as a result of a heart attack. She was 42. In honour of her impact on success of Novi Fosili, on 10th anniversary of her death, Novi Fosili made a tribute concert, and amongs members of Novi Fosili, there were also; Oliver Dragojević, Nina Badrić, Vanna, Vinko Coce, Emilija Kokić, Zdenka Kovačiček and many others.

=== Further success with Sanja Doležal (1983–1991) ===
After Đurđica decided to leave the group, the rest of the group members were looking for new female lead vocal singer. They held an audition and they met Sanja Doležal. Sanja was an 19-year-old student of Faculty of Humanities and Social Sciences, University of Zagreb. Sanja described the first meeting with band members: “I met Slobodan Momčilović (Moka) for coffee and he gave me 24 hours to think. It was in the spring of 1983, I had been learning songs all summer, and on October 18th I had my first concert with Fosili in Maribor. That first performance was chaotic, everything was confused in my head. Marinko and the other band members were not very enthusiastic. I was a kid, and Đurđa was a top singer, professional and a mature woman. However, after the first few concerts, the guys accepted me and realized that my youth made up for all the shortcomings I had.” Sanja became a lead vocal singer at the age of 19.

In 1983, the band released 6th studio album and 1st with their new singer Doležal titled Poslije svega ("After everything"), with songs "Bilo mi je prvi put" ("It was my first time"), "Nije istina" ("It's not true") and biggest hit "Milena" who sings Rajko Dujmić with backing vocals. The album was sold in 200,000 units. In 1985, they released the seventh studio album, Tvoje i moje godine which has sold in 50,000 units. In summer of 1985, Slobodan Momčilović (Moka) died, and instead of him Nenad Šarić took his place as a drummer. Sanja and Neno were good friends for two years before falling in love. The group gained another success and fame following their 1986 eight studio album, Za dobra stara vremena ("For good old times"). Hits include: "Za dobra stara vremena" ("For good old times"), "Putuj sretno" ("Travel happy"), and others. At their peak in 1987, Novi Fosili performed at the Eurovision Song Contest 1987, with their song "Ja sam za ples" ("I wanna dance").

There is certainly fear, because it is a great responsibility to go out in front of people with the thought that your whole family and the whole country are watching you. I was confused, I didn't know whether I would rather win or disappear, that I would simply be gone or that everything would go back a few hours and we would start all over again, I had the impression that then I could do everything much better.

- Sanja Doležal in 1990.

They finished a high 4th place in Brussels at 1987 Eurovision Song Contest. In 1987, they released 9th studio album, Dijete sreće ("Child of luck"), with the songs "Znam" ("I know"), "Dobre djevojke" ("Good girls"), following by their 1988 album Nebeske kočije ("Heavenly Chariots), 1989 album: Obriši suze, generacijo ("Wipe away your tears, generation"), 1990 album: “Djeca ljubavi” (“Children of love”), and their 1993 compilation album Najbolje godine ("The best years") which turned out to be their last album with Sanja Doležal.

Sanja sang in Novi Fosili for nine years until the beginning of the war, when the group members split up and each went their own way. After the breakup with Fosili, Sanja had her first experience on television. She recorded “Radio Nja-Nja”, “Jel me netko tražio” and “Sedmu noć”.

=== Novi fosili with Nataša Belošević and Jelena Fošner (1995–2001) ===
After the breakup of Yugoslavia, the group was disbanded, only to reconvene without Doležal and Zec, under a new branding of new 2000s pop music, featuring vocals of singers Nataša Belošević and Jelena Fošner. “Working in the renewed New Fossils in the nineties was a challenge. But we got along, Vladimir Pavelić Bubi and Nataša Mirković (ex Belošević) still perform with us as backing vocalists. The problem was that we didn't click with the audience properly. It was a complex combination that couldn't last. It was such a time, and Rajko also had an authorial crisis, he didn't make any strong songs at that time, although he tried” reveals Marinko Colnago from today's perspective. The line-up also included Vladimir Pavelić Bubi and Dalibor Barišić, with the help of Dubravko Vorih, Zlatko Bebek and Damir Gonza, and Vladimir and Nataša remained in the band as backing vocalists even after the line-up reunited with Sanja.

Novi Fosili, together with new singers, released four albums; Druge godine ("Other years") in 1995, Bijele suze padaju na grad ("White tears are falling down on the city") in 1996, Pričaj mi o ljubavi ("Talk to me about love") in 1998 and Jesen ("Autumn") in 1999. The band was disbanded again in 2001.

=== Reunion and new releases (2005–2024) ===
Members of the most memorable lineup gathered again in 2005 for some revival concerts. Rajko Dujmić, for his musical contribution and contribution for success of Novi Fosili received a Porin for life achievement award in 2013. In 2014, scandals arose surrounding Dujmić's long time drug use, causing him to be expelled from the group. "Due to Dujmić's serious illness, we have decided to stop the group's work for the time being. Namely, it is known that Rajko has been battling addiction for about thirty years, which is why we separated in 1991 after he refused to go for treatment," Sanja Doležal, Marinko Colnago and Vladimir Kočiš Zec told in an interview with 24sata. Disagreements between the band members continued, and a few years ago, Rajko sued his bandmates.

“Unfortunately, we are still in court because Rajko Dujmić sued us over the name “Novi fosili”. He banned us from using that name,” Sanja said in an interview.

“I am sorry that all this happened because I think that a band like “Novi fosili”, which is celebrating its 50th anniversary this year, did not deserve such a stain on its existence,” Doležal said in 2019, adding that Dujmić is a genius and the best musician in our region. The remaining members still hold small revival concerts. In July 2020, Rajko Dujmić got seriously injured in traffic accident, where he later died in Rijeka Clinical Hospital Center at the age of 65. The rest of the group members went on revival concerts including concert in Canada and rest of the Europe and countries of SFRJ.

In November 2024, the group held last (farewell) concert in Arena Zagreb. "It's time. We've been through so much for a few years now. But if we're going to say goodbye, then let's do it right," Sanja Doležal said. "There's no Dinamo match without the “Blue Shirt”, there's no good party without “Diridonda” or “For the Good Old Days”, there's no Christmas Eve without a performance on the Square at noon with a team that's been coming for years. Zagreb is our city and we want to give all Zagreb residents a party to remember," she added.

== Group Members ==
- Slobodan Momčilović Moka – drummer, founder (1969–1985, died 1985)
- Slavomir Cvija – keyboards, vocal (1969–1976)
- Milan Čaleta Čale – guitar, vocal (1969–1976)
- Marinko Colnago – bass-guitar, vocal (1969–1991, 1995–1997, 2005–2025; died 2025)
- Vjekoslav Slavko Kink – tenor, saxophone (1969–2014)
- Ivica Piskulić – trumpet (1969–?)
- Antun Pavić Tuna – guitar (1969–?)
- Radmilo Maslovarić – trombone (?)
- Zvonimir Makar Šiljo – (?)
- Zoran Vlaović - gitara (?)
- Rajko Dujmić Lima – keyboards, vocal (1976–1991, 1995–2001, 2005–2014, died 2020)
- Vladimir Kočiš Zec – guitar, vocal, (1977–1991, 2005–present)
- Nenad Šarić Brada – drummer (1985–1991, 2005–2012, died 2012)
- Đurđica Barlović – vocal (1976–1983, died 1992)
- Sanja Doležal – vocal (1983–1991, 2005–present)
- Nataša Belošević – vocal (1995–2001)
- Jelena Fošner – vocal (1995–2001)
- Vladimir Pavelić – drums, vocal (1995–2001)
- Dalibor Barišić Dado – keyboards, vocal (1995–1997)

== Albums ==
=== Studio albums ===
Title	Album details	Main vocalist	Sales
Novi fosili	Released: 1974; Label: Jugoton; Formats: LP, cassette		
Da te ne volim	Released: 1978; Label: Jugoton; Formats: LP, cassette	Đurđica Barlović	170,000
Nedovršene priče	Released: 1980; Label: Jugoton; Formats: LP, cassette	Đurđica Barlović	
Budi uvijek blizu	Released: 1981; Label: Jugoton; Formats: LP, cassette	Đurđica Barlović	712,000
Za djecu i odrasle	Released: 1982; Label: Jugoton; Formats: LP, cassette	Đurđica Barlović	200,000
Poslije svega	Released: 1983; Label: Jugoton; Formats: LP, cassette	Sanja Doležal	200,000
Tvoje i moje godine	Released: 1985; Label: Jugoton; Formats: LP, cassette	Sanja Doležal	50,000
Za dobra stara vremena	Released: 1986; Label: Jugoton; Formats: LP, cassette	Sanja Doležal	
Dijete sreće	Released: 1987; Label: Jugoton; Formats: LP, cassette	Sanja Doležal	
Nebeske kočije	Released: 1988; Label: Jugoton; Formats: LP, cassette	Sanja Doležal	
Obriši suze, generacijo	Released: 1989; Label: Jugoton; Formats: LP, cassette	Sanja Doležal	
Djeca ljubavi	Released: 1991; Label: Jugoton; Formats: LP, cassette	Sanja Doležal	
Druge godine	Released: 1995; Label: Croatia Records; Formats: LP, cassette, CD	Jelena Fošner & Nataša Belošević	
Bijele suze padaju na grad	Released: 1996; Label: Croatia Records; Formats: LP, cassette, CD	Jelena Fošner & Nataša Belošević	
Pričaj mi o ljubavi	Released: 1998; Label: Croatia Records; Formats: LP, cassette, CD	Jelena Fošner & Nataša Belošević	
Jesen	Released: 1999; Label: Croatia Records; Formats: LP, cassette, CD	Jelena Fošner & Nataša Belošević	

=== Compilation albums ===
Title	Album details	Main vocalist	Sales
Hitovi sa singl ploča	Released: 1980; Label: Jugoton; Formats: LP, cassette	Đurđica Barlović	
Volim te od 9 do 2 (i drugi veliki hitovi)	Released: 1983; Label: Jugoton; Formats: LP, cassette	Đurđica Barlović	
Poziv na ples	Released: 1987; Label: Jugoton; Formats: LP, cassette	Sanja Doležal	
Najbolje godine	Released: 1993; Label: Jugoton; Formats: LP, cassette	Sanja Doležal	
Ljubav koja nema kraj vol. 1	Released: 1998; Label: Croatia Records; Formats: LP, cassette, CD	Various	
Ljubav koja nema kraj vol. 2	Released: 1998; Label: Croatia Records; Formats: LP, cassette, CD	Various	
Za dobra stara vremena 2005	Released: 2005; Label: Croatia Records; Formats: LP, cassette, CD	Various	
The Platinum Collection	Released: 2006; Label: Croatia Records; Formats: CD	Various	
Love collection (najbolje ljubavne pjesme)	Released: 2010; Label: Croatia Records; Formats: CD	Various	
Uvijek blizu (Najbolje od Fosila 1969 - 1999)	Released: 2011; Label: Croatia Records; Formats: CD	Various	
Novi fosili Live!	Released: 2013; Label: Croatia Records; Formats: CD	Various	
50 Originalnih Pjesama	Released: 2019; Label: Croatia Records; Formats: CD	Various	
25 Greatest hits	Released: 2024; Label: Croatia Records; Formats: CD	Various	

== Sources ==
Preceded by Doris Dragović	Yugoslavia in the Eurovision Song Contest; 1987	Succeeded by Srebrna krila
