= Nenad Nikolić (footballer, born 1961) =

Serbian footballer

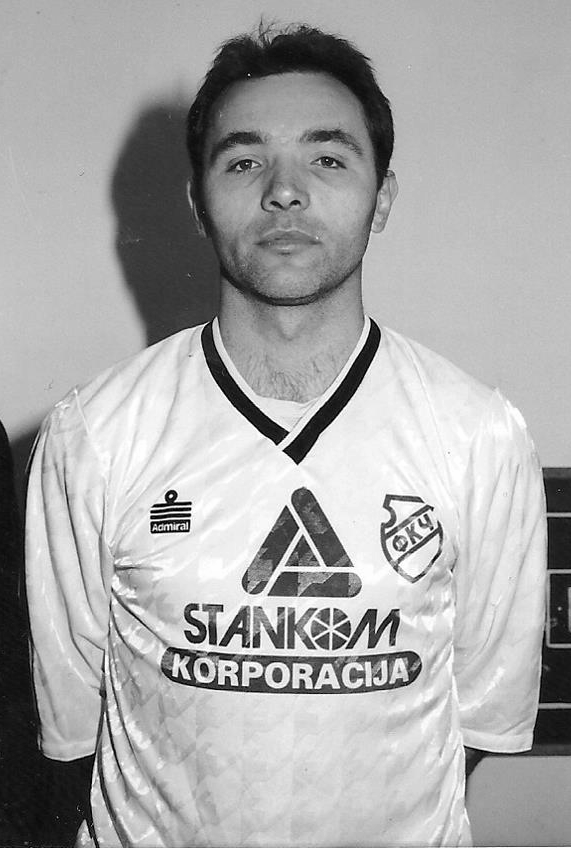

Personal information
- Full name: Nenad Nikolić
- Date of birth: 20 August 1961
- Place of birth: Lipljan, FPR Yugoslavia
- Date of death: 30 April 1999 (aged 37)
- Place of death: Belgrade, FR Yugoslavia
- Position: Defender

Youth career
- Partizan

Senior career*
Years	Team	Apps	(Gls)
- Čukarički
- Žarkovo
- Čukarički
- Proleter Zrenjanin
1989–1990	Tacoma Stars	26	(0)
1990–1992	Proleter Zrenjanin	60	(0)
- Čukarički
- * Club domestic league appearances and goals

Nenad Nikolić (Serbian Cyrillic: Ненад Николић; 20 August 1961 – 30 April 1999) was a Serbian footballer who spent most of his career with FK Čukarički.

He was killed, at the age of 37, on 30 April 1999 during the NATO bombing of Yugoslavia.

== Early life ==
Nikolić was born in Lipljan, PR Serbia, FPR Yugoslavia. His father's name was Ljubomir. As a young child he moved to Zemun with his family, while a year later he moved to, Petlovo Brdo, where he lived until the death. He grew up with his twin sister Nada and his older brother Zoran. Since he was a young child, his talent and love for football was obvious. His desire and passion for football, made him spend day and night on the field.

Nikolić graduated from Gymnasium XIII in Belgrade, Serbia.

== Family ==
Nikolić had a twin sister, Nada, and older brother, Zoran. Nikolić's godfather was Cypriot footballer Vesko Mihajlović. Nikolić married Snežana in 1991. He left behind two little children, at the time of his death, an eight-month-old Aleksandar, and a two-year-old Katarina.

Nikolić joined Tacoma Stars in the United States, but returned later, to open a food processing Family business shop in Banovo brdo, Belgrade, in the immediate vicinity of Čukarički Stadium. The shop still exists, renamed, NENAD.

== Death ==
NATO began an aerial bombing campaign on Yugoslavia on 24 March 1999. Nikolić was a reservist in Serbia's Ministry of Internal Affairs, and was assigned to guard the ministry's headquarters on Kneza Miloša street. On 30 April 1999, a bomb was dropped at the headquarters while Nikolić was covering the nightshift, causing damages to the building and its surrounding area. Nikolić was not injured, but while he was trying to evacuate the injured, a second bomb was dropped, and he was killed.

== Legacy ==
=== Nenad Neša Nikolić Memorial Tournament ===
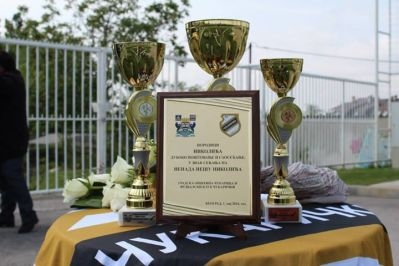
FK Čukarički awards, and medallion

Nenad Neša Nikolić Memorial Tournament took place on FK Čukarički football field in 2014, and is held annually since then, to commemorate him. The tournament is supported by the Municipality of Čukarica.

=== Honors and awards ===
- The Ministries of Foreign Affairs has a memorial in his name
- Posthumously awarded the Order of Merit in the field of defense and security
