= Nenad Firšt =

Slovenian composer

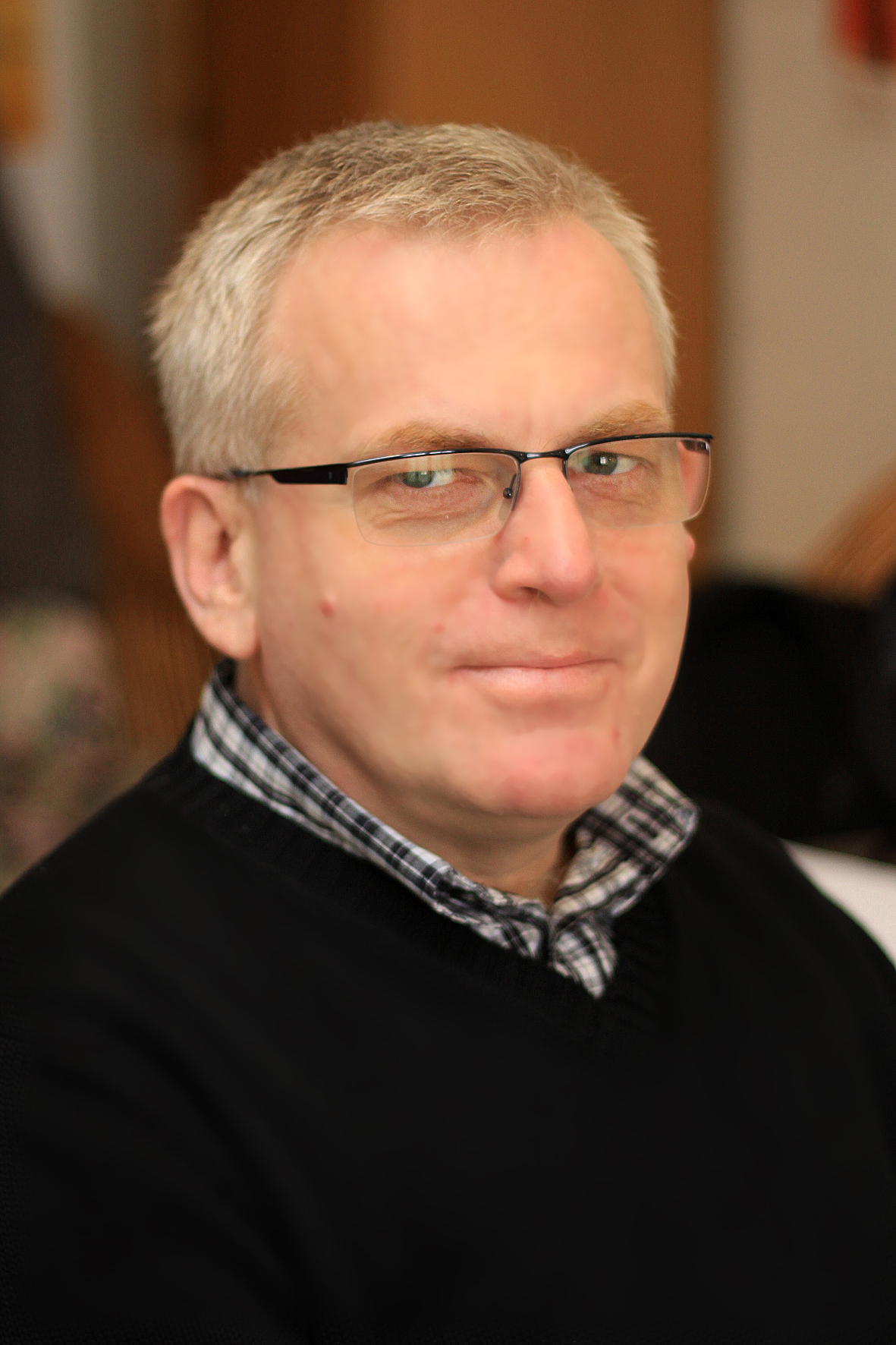
Nenad Firšt

Nenad Firšt (born November 6, 1964, in Zagreb), is a Slovene composer, conductor and violinist.

Nenad Firšt received a high school musical education at the Zagreb High School of Music before moving to Ljubljana to study at the Ljubljana Academy of Music under Dane Škerl (composition) and Rok Klopčič (violin). He completed his study of chamber music and composition at home in Slovenia, in Hungary, and in France.

In 1982, he joined the Croatian Sebastian string quartet, from Zagreb, with which he toured nationally and internationally until 1992. In 1988, he moved to live in Celje, Slovenia, where he is the artistic director and conductor of the Celje String Orchestra. He is also the director of the Celje Institute for Cultural Performances.

Between 1993 and 1998, he was President of the Musical Youth organisation and he has been artistic director of Musical Youth's International Music Camp at Dolenjske Toplice since 1996.

He has received various awards and recognitions, including the Prešeren Award of the Ljubljana Academy of Music in Ljubljana (for the composition of his 3rd String Quartet) and the Prešeren Award of the Municipality of Celje.

On 7 February 2009, Nenad Firšt was one of the two Prešeren Foundation Award laureates from the field of music, recognised for artistic achievements in the previous two years including his "Concertino for flute, saxophone and orchestra", "Concerto for two saxophones and string instruments", "In the very moment of pause", for chamber ensemble, "Magic Mountain", for symphony orchestra, "Letters" for violin and chamber orchestra, and "Odeon", for chamber orchestra". (The prestigious awards are named in honour of Slovenia's national poet, France Prešeren).

His work for chamber orchestra "Odeon" was performed by the KOS DSS Chamber Orchestra on a tour of Germany in 2008 as part of the cultural programme celebrating Slovenia's Presidency of the EU.

In the programme notes for the 2009 Prešeren Prizes ceremony, Firšt's fellow composer Crt Sojar Voglar wrote that "His highly individual leanings towards the avant garde are perceptible in all of his works which, without being unduly experimental, demonstrate an incredible originality that emerges from a synthesis of his devotion to formal proportions and an expressive mix of thoughtful intimacy and pronounced playfulness, combined with a distinctive melodic voice and harmonic penetration that is always on the edge or just beyond the edge of the traditions of older music. His instrumentation, always in the service of expression, often explores interesting and unfamiliar sound colours — sometimes thick and full, other times randomly dispersed and mysterious."

== Selected works ==
Much of Firšt's music is published by Društvo Slovenskih Skladateljev.

- Love Song for 2 Violas (1988)
- SSSSS, Variations for Viola and Double Bass (1991)
- Tres Faciunt Collegium for Clarinet, Viola and Piano (2001)
