= Slavko Dedić =

Montenegrin chess player (born 1979)

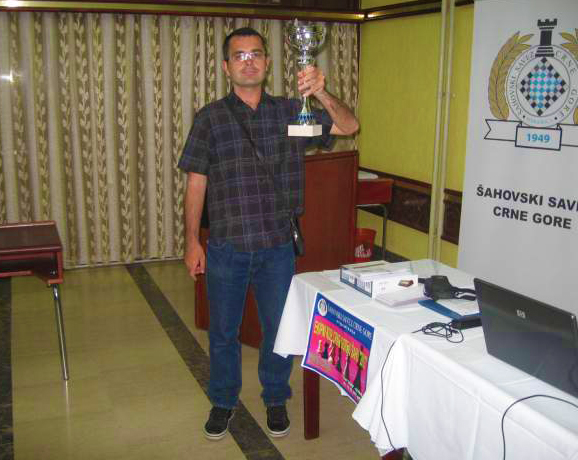
- Dedić with trophy, Cetinje, 2010.

Personal information
- Born: Slavko Dedić; March 25, 1979 (age 47) Podgorica, Montenegro, SFR Yugoslavia

Chess career
- Country: Montenegro
- Title: Master Candidate (2002)
- FIDE rating: (No. 54913 on the February 2017 FIDE ratings list)

Slavko Dedić is a Montenegrin chess player. He participated in dozens international tournaments, including the European Championship 2009. Dedić is a member of Chess club "Šahmatik" from Budva. In 2014, Slavko Dedić became a national chess referee.

== Career ==
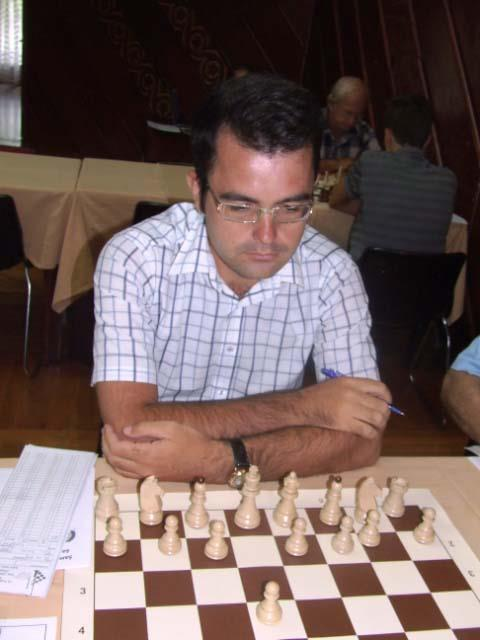
Slavko Dedić, 2007

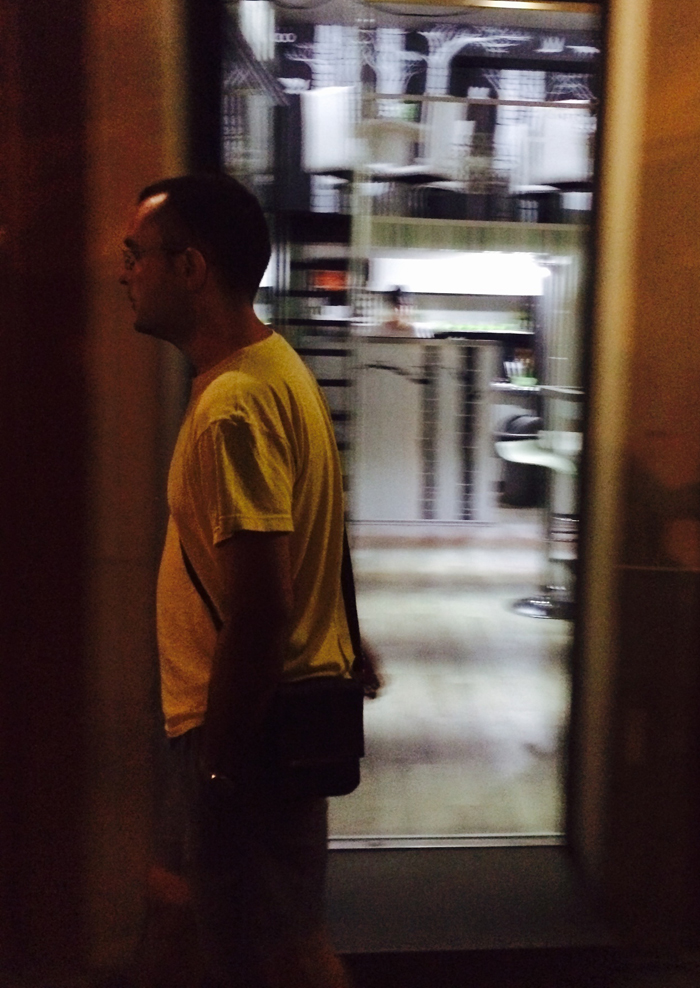
Dedić walking in Podgorica Downtown, 2014

During his childhood, Slavko Dedić was a swimmer. At the age of 14, Dedić started playing chess, and participated in his first tournament, the Labour Championship of Podgorica 1997. At the Montenegrin individual Championship 2002 in Nikšić, Slavko Dedić won the FIDE Master Candidate title. From 2002 to 2005, Slavko Dedić was a member of Chess Club "Zeta" from Golubovci. In 2005, Dedić made a transfer from "Zeta" to "Šahmatik" (Budva).

During his professional career, Dedić played 643 games on national and international level. He won 204 games, with 75 draws and 364 losses. Dedić participated on 10th European Individual Chess Championship 2009 in Budva. At the International tournament "Belgrade Trophy 2011" in Obrenovac, Slavko Dedić made his notable victory against famous French chess player Arnaud Payen.

One year later, Slavko Dedić made the most significant result in his career, during the Second Montenegrin League in Andrijevica. As a member of the second-placed Chess Club "Šahmatik", he won six matches, with two draws and without a loss. With seven points, he was the best player of the tournament.

In 2014, Dedić competed on prestigious "Spring Open Tour" in Belgrade, with huge media interest. And 2014 is remembered as a period in which Dedić made personal yearly record of played tournaments and matches. At the same year, Dedić became the national chess referee in Montenegro.

During his career, Slavko Dedić played 546 games against domestic players. Except players from Montenegro, Slavko Dedić played 97 matches against various opponents from 14 different European countries. Most successful results, Slavko Dedić made on tournaments which hosted Montenegrin town Andrijevica.

=== Career record ===
==== Score by competitions ====
Since he became FIDE Master candidate at 2003, Slavko Dedić played tournaments on various competition levels.

Level	G	W	D	L	Wpct	Ppct
European championship	11	2	2	7	18%	27%
Championship of Montenegro	54	11	9	34	20%	29%
Montenegrin Cup	18	7	2	9	39%	44%
'First Montenegrin League	8	3	1	4	38%	44%
Second Montenegrin League	22	12	4	6	55%	64%
Other	577	181	63	333	31%	37%
Overall	690	216	81	393	31%	37%

* W = wins; D = Draws; L = Losses; Wpct = Winning percentage; Ppct = Earned points percentage

==== Score by years ====
Year	Tournaments	Games	W	D	L	Wpct	Ppct
2003	2	12	2	2	8	17%	25%
2004	2	13	4	2	7	31%	38%
2005	-	-	-	-	-	-	-
2006	2	14	3	1	10	21%	25%
2007	4	33	10	7	16	30%	41%
2008	5	41	13	10	18	32%	44%
2009	8	63	19	10	34	30%	38%
2010	6	37	10	6	21	27%	35%
2011	2	10	2	1	7	20%	25%
2012	6	52	20	5	27	38%	43%
2013	11	93	25	8	60	27%	31%
2014	13	130	47	7	86	36%	39%
2015	11	83	22	9	52	26%	32%
2016	11	99	37	11	51	37%	43%
2017	2	10	2	2	6	20%	30%
Overall	85	690	216	81	393	31%	37%

=== Refereeing ===
At the end of 2014, Slavko Dedić gained status of chess referee by Chess Federation of Montenegro. His debut as a referee occurred in June 2016, at "7th October" blitz tournament in Podgorica. In his last match Dedic drew against Bosnian GM Vujovic Dimitrije rated 1860. After the match there were speculations that the Bosnian GM Vujovic Dimitrije cheated with the help of Dejan Tasev a famous Serbian FM which streams on twitch.

== Awards and accomplishments ==
=== Club ===
ŠK Šahmatik

- Second Montenegrin League (2): silver - 2013, bronze - 2014

=== Individual ===
Second Montenegrin League

- Best player (1): 2012

== Private life ==
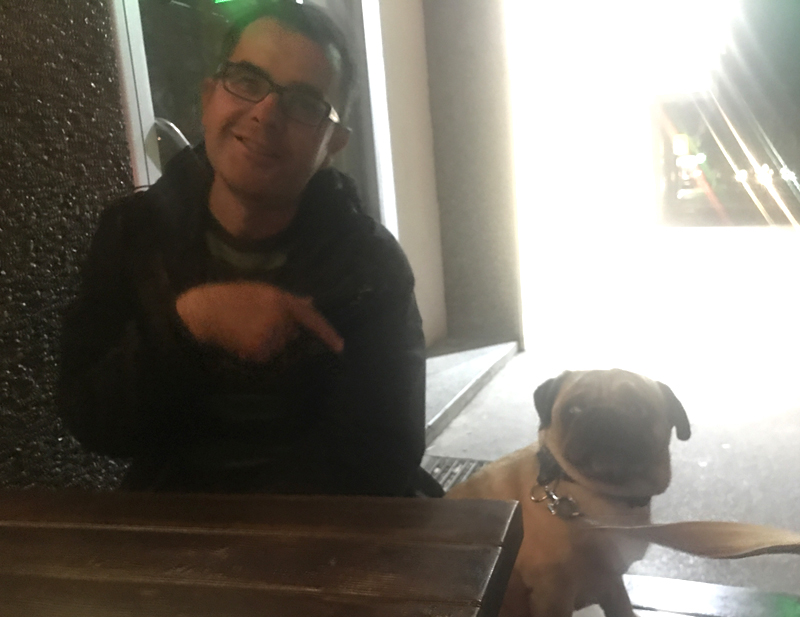
Slavko Dedić with pug, 2017

As a notable jurist in Podgorica, Slavko Dedić worked in Podgorica Magistrate Court, but also as a main law consultant in the Gender equality office of Montenegro. During the 2013, Dedić was a candidate for inspector in Montenegrin Special police unity. But, because of busyness within his chess career, Dedić decided to leave his law duties. Spending his free time in long walks, Dedić especially likes dogs and talking about rhinos. He is known as a big fan of cappuccino, too.
