= Dušan Mijić (publisher) =

Serbian publisher and political figure

Dušan Mijić (Serbian Cyrillic: Душан Мијић; born 1953) is a publisher and political figure in Serbia. He is best known for publishing the newspaper Borba and the breakaway Naša borba in the 1990s. He is now a prominent figure in Serbia's Liberal Democratic Party (LDP).

== Early private career ==
Mijić was born to a wealthy family in the area of Sombor, Vojvodina. He was educated as an agronomist and was an entrepreneur in the time of the Socialist Federal Republic of Yugoslavia (SFRY), working in the export of cereals.

== Publisher ==
=== Editorial stance and relations with state authorities ===
Borba, formerly the official gazette of the Yugoslav Communist Party, became a limited company in 1991; the government continued to own seventeen per cent of its shares. Mijić's became the paper's director and main shareholder, and the paper pursued an editorial line critical of the Serbian government.

In November 1994, a civil tribunal rejected Mijić's efforts to register the paper as a private business and declared its 1991 agreement with the Yugoslavian government to be null and void. Following this decision, the Serbian government initiated a campaign against the paper's independent political stance; Mijić charged this was part of a more general campaign by Milošević against independent media in Serbia. Mijić was quoted as saying, "The intention is clear: behind the judicial machinations lies a plan to liquidate the independent Borba." The following month, state authorities appointed Yugoslavian information secretary Dragutin Brčin as the paper's director. This led to a split within the paper, in which the more numerous "rebel" group resigned to start a new paper called Naša borba. The new paper was overseen by the private company Fininvest, owned by Mijić.

Mijić gave an interview to The Washington Post in January 1997, in which he described Naŝa borba as "the only source of independent news [in Serbia] outside the government and the opposition" and argued that it was emerging as a "political option" for Serbs hoping for opposition parties to take a clearer stance on human rights issues, the International Criminal Tribunal for the former Yugoslavia, and relations with neighbouring countries. He added that the paper was facing ongoing internal sanctions, including a ban on purchasing local newsprint and using Belgrade printing presses. Newly appointed Serbian information minister Radmila Milentijević criticized Mijić's comments the following month, saying that it was "irresponsible to tell such an important paper that there is only one independent paper in Serbia," and asking, "How do the owners of Blic, Svedok and other papers feel about that?"

In 1997, the World Association of Newspapers and News Publishers awarded its Golden Pen award to Naša borba and two other papers from the former SFRY. In accepting the award, Mijić said that the paper would continue to "strive to help the creation of a new civil, democratic society with justice and equality" while seeking the "reconciliation of the wounded people of the former Yugoslavia."

Serbia's government passed a restrictive public information law in October 1998 that permitted the state to exercise greater authority over the country's newspapers. Naša borba was briefly banned under the terms of this law. Although the ban was soon lifted, the paper did not return to circulation. Mijić and the paper's union representative issued a statement that "the conditions for Naša borba to continue work with the editorial concept that it has had so far did not exist, and that the employees were not prepared to give up such concepts."

=== Labour relations ===
Mijić's relations with his employees at Naŝa borba were often tumultuous. In October 1995, the editorial board called a ten-day strike for better working conditions, progress on the reorganization of the company, and input on the appointment of the next editor-in-chief. The action was called off when Mirko Klarin was appointed temporary editor-in-chief for a period of two months.

In June 1997, workers at Naša borba who were opposed to Mijić's leadership left the paper to form Danas.

Another labour dispute arose the following year, when workers demanded overdue back pay. Mijić himself became acting editor-in-chief of the paper during this time, and in August 1998 he published a free issue of Naša borba saying that he would have to temporarily suspend publication to "clear up the situation in the paper and conduct financial and personnel restructuring." The paper returned to publication shortly thereafter.

=== End of Naša borba ===
Naša borba never returned to circulation after its October 1998 shutdown. Mijić said that the paper could not continue operating at a loss. Some members of the editorial staff disagreed with this assessment, questioning his commitment to free journalism, charging that his oversight of the paper was non-transparent, and saying that certain large-scale expenses were not justified.

== Liberal Democratic Party official ==
Mijić became vice-president and Vojvodina provincial leader of the LDP in April 2011 and led the party's Preokret (U-Turn) electoral list in the 2012 provincial election. The list narrowly missed crossing the electoral threshold to win representation in the assembly.

In 2013, Mijić and the LDP sought to create a new political alliance, centred around a redefinition of Vojvodina's constitutional status and the preservation of the province's autonomy. He said that the party intended to prevent a repetition of the 1988 "Yoghurt Revolution," in which forces loyal to the central government in Belgrade took over the Vojvodina administration under the banner of "anti-bureaucracy." Mijić was quoted as saying, "It is absolutely clear that rightist forces are trying to reduce the cost of what centralists believe they have to give Vojvodina. It is very important therefore for the civic Vojvodina to oppose such attempts by forming a strong bloc of pro-EU and democratic forces in Vojvodina. The front should be formed around a concrete programme and the LDP will present a platform and invite all political parties that think alike as well as non-governmental organizations to join us."

Mijić received the tenth position on the LDP's list in the 2014 Serbian parliamentary election. The list missed crossing the electoral threshold. In the 2016 Serbian parliamentary election, he received the thirtieth position on a coalition list of the LDP, the Social Democratic Party, and the League of Social Democrats of Vojvodina. The list won thirteen mandates, and he was not elected.
