= Sanja Doležal =

Croatian singer and television host

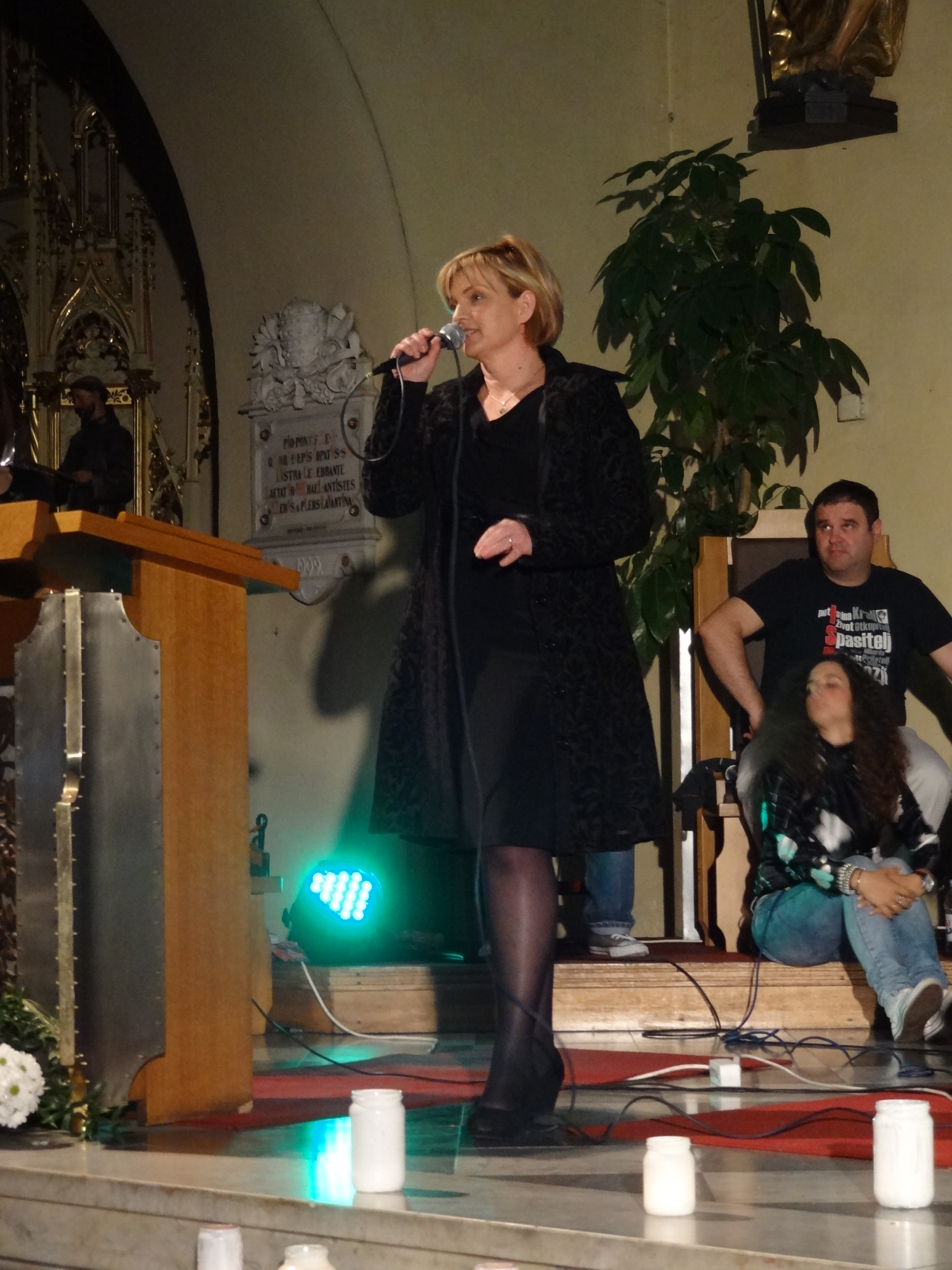
- Born: Sanja Doležal; 9 May 1963 (age 63); Zagreb, SR Croatia, Yugoslavia (now Croatia)
- Occupations: Singer, television host
- Spouse: Nenad Šarić (m. 1993; died 2012)
- Children: 2

Sanja Doležal (born 9 May 1963) is a Croatian singer and television host.

She is best known for being a member of the pop music band Novi fosili between 1983 and the early 1990s, during the peak of the group's popularity.

After retiring from her singing career, Doležal appeared in several television hosting roles before starting her own daily talk show titled Sanja in 2004 on the newly founded private-owned television channel RTL Televizija. Sanja ran from May 2004 until the summer of 2006, when it was cancelled. The show discussed various issues of everyday life and it featured both celebrity guests and regular people.

In late 2010, she appeared in Ples sa zvijezdama, the Croatian version of Dancing with the Stars, aired on HRT 1.

During 2014 she hosted the morning talk show Dobro Jutro, Hrvatska, aired on HRT 1.

She currently hosts the segment Kuhanje je IN on IN Magazin, a series that focuses on various subjects. Airing on Nova TV as well as performing in the Croatian version of Menopause.

== Early life and career ==
As a child she appeared in commercials for Medolino and Frutolino, brands of baby food manufactured by Croatian company Podravka. She also practiced karate. She then joined a Zagreb pop-rock band "First Love" in 1981. It was the first teen band in the former Yugoslavia, which continued to be active between 1978 and 1982. During her time with the group she recorded the album Private (1981) and If we remain alone (1982).

In 1983 she joined Novi fosili, a pop band founded in 1969, to replace their first singer Đurđica Barlović. Doležal remained with the band until 1991, and re-joined them again in 2005. With Doležal, the band released seven albums and became one of the most popular pop acts in Yugoslavia, selling hundreds of thousands of records and regularly performing at sold-out venues. During their heyday, the band represented Yugoslavia in the 1987 Eurovision Song Contest (on her 24th birthday), with the song Ja sam za ples (I Wanna Dance) and finished fourth with 92 points.

After leaving the band in 1991, she went on to play the role of a celebrity journalist in the music and comedy show Je’l me netko tražio (aired on HRT).

She recorded three solo albums to much less success, before retiring from singing in the early 2000s. She then hosted her own daytime talk show Sanja on RTL from 2004 to 2006. In 2014 she became one of the hosts of Croatian Radiotelevision's morning program Dobro jutro, Hrvatska (Good Morning Croatia).

She currently hosts the segment Kuhanje je IN on IN Magazin, airing on Nova TV, as well as performing in the Croatian version of Menopause.

== Discography ==
=== Albums ===
- Non stop ples (1993)
- Kao u snu (1994)
- Plavuša (2000)

=== Guest singles ===
- "Obećaj mi" – with Alen Islamović (2011)
- "Carpe Diem" – with Hladno Pivo (2021)

== Filmography ==
Film
Year	Title	Role	Notes
1998	The Prince of Egypt	Queen Tuya	Croatian dub
2004	Bore Lee: Čuvaj se sinjske ruke	Herself	
2006	Nad lipom 35	Herself	TV series
2011	Lea and Darija	Nina Selak	
