= Nenad Cvetković =

Nenad Cvetković may refer to:

- Nenad Cvetković (born 1948), retired Serbian association football player
- Nenad R. Cvetković (born 1996), Serbian association football player who plays for FK Sloboda Užice
- Nenad N. Cvetković (born 1996), Serbian association football player who plays for FC Ashdod
