= Nenad Mitrović =

Nenad Mitrović may refer to:

- Nenad Mitrović (footballer, born 1980), Serbian footballer
- Nenad Mitrović (footballer, born 1998), Serbian football goalkeeper
- Nenad Mitrović, Yugoslav musician, former guitarist of Rock group Osmi putnik
- Nenad Mitrović (Serbian Progressive Party politician) (born 1973)
- Nenad Mitrović (Democratic Party politician) (born 1970)
