= Nenad Ćirković =

Serbian footballer

Personal information
- Date of birth: 9 July 1973 (age 53)
- Height: 1.87 m (6 ft 1 1/2 in)
- Position: Midfielder

Senior career*
| Years | Team | Apps | (Gls) |
| 1989–1990 | Mladost Lučani | 14 | (0) |
| 1994–1995 | Sloboda Užice | | |
| 1997–1998 | Sloga Kraljevo | | |
| 1998–1999 | Borac Čačak | | |
| 1999 | Milicionar | | |
| 2000 | Uralan Elista | 10 | (0) |
| Total | | +24 | (+0) |
- * Club domestic league appearances and goals

Nenad Ćirković (Serbian Cyrillic: Ненад Ћирковић; born 9 July 1973) is a Serbian retired footballer.
