= Nenad Žvanut =

Croatian speed skater

Personal information
- Nationality: Croatian
- Born: 23 April 1962 (age 62); Rijeka, Yugoslavia

Sport
- Sport: Speed skating

Nenad Žvanut (born 23 April 1962) is a Croatian speed skater. He competed at the 1984 Winter Olympics and the 1988 Winter Olympics.
