= Nenad Vorih =

Croatian painter

- Born: August 1, 1963 (age 63); Zagreb, Croatia
- Citizenship: European Union, Croatia
- Education: Academy of Art; University of Zagreb
- Known for: Painting, Illustration
- Awards: Porin (illustration)
- Website: http://www.mynameisvorih.hr

Nenad Vorih is a Croatian artist (born August 1, 1963 in Zagreb). Vorih completed his academic studies under Ferdinand Kulmer and began his career under the tutelage of Croatian painter Edo Murtić.

== Background ==
Vorih does action painting utilizing several styles, including the influence of Mannerism through an exaggerated perspective, Baroque in the contrast of light and shadow, as well as, the techniques of Impressionism, Pointillism, and Abstract Expressionism.

His application of action painting using several styles and techniques, across genres, specifically figurative art and veduta, has earned Vorih recognition as having significance in contemporary painting.

Through his last cycle of paintings, which have centered on metropolises, Vorih established new aesthetic criteria, expanding the horizon of action in relation to the classical understanding of painting veduta.

== Illustration ==
Vorih received the Porin for the cover art illustration of the Parni valjak album Buđenje.
