= Nenad Stankov =

Macedonian basketball player

Vardar
- Position: Small forward
- League: Macedonian First League

Personal information
- Born: January 16, 1992 (age 34) Macedonia
- Listed height: 1.92 m (6 ft 4 in)

Career information
- Playing career: 2011–present

Career history
- 2011–2012: Rabotnički
- 2012–2013: Vardar
- 2013: Rabotnički
- 2013–2014: Feni Industries
- 2014–2016: Rabotnički
- 2016–present: Vardar

Nenad Stankov (born January 16, 1992) is a Macedonian professional basketball Small forward who currently plays for Vardar in the Macedonian First League.
