= Nenad Dedić =

Croatian footballer

Personal information
- Date of birth: 2 February 1990 (age 36)
- Place of birth: Sisak, SFR Yugoslavia
- Height: 1.77 m (5 ft 10 in)
- Position: Left-back

Team information
- Current team: SV Neresheim
- Number: 11

Youth career
- Segesta

Senior career*
| Years | Team | Apps | (Gls) |
| 2008–2011 | Segesta | 45 | (2) |
| 2011–2012 | Karlovac | 11 | (0) |
| 2012 | NK Lekenik | 15 | (0) |
| 2013 | Szeged 2011 | 5 | (0) |
| 2013 | Baník Ostrava | 8 | (0) |
| 2014 | Željezničar Sarajevo | 3 | (0) |
| 2014–2015 | Zavrč | 14 | (0) |
| 2015–2016 | Segesta Sisak | 28 | (3) |
| 2016–2017 | SV Ebnat | 27 | (6) |
| 2017– | SV Neresheim | 84 | (9) |
- * Club domestic league appearances and goals as of 8 July 2022

Nenad Dedić (born 2 February 1990) is a Croatian footballer who plays as a left-back for SV Neresheim.

== Club career ==
Before joining Neresheim, he had a spell at fellow German side SV Ebnat as well as in Slovenia, Bosnia, the Czech Republic and Hungary.
