= Nenad Stamenković =

Serbian footballer

Personal information
- Full name: Nenad Stamenković
- Date of birth: July 7, 1977 (age 49)
- Place of birth: Niš, SFR Yugoslavia
- Height: 1.83 m (6 ft 0 in)
- Position: Defender

Senior career*
Years	Team	Apps	(Gls)
1999–2002	Radnički Niš	40	(1)
2002–2003	Mladost Apatin	10	(0)
2003–2004	OFK Niš	13	(0)
2004–2005	Radnički Niš	24	(0)
2005–2006	Marek Dupnitsa	10	(1)
2006–2007	Radnički Niš	16	(0)
2008–2010	Sinđelić Niš	55	(3)
2010–2012	Radnički Niš	49	(3)
Total		217	(8)

Managerial career
- 2012–2015: Radnički Niš (Assistant)
- * Club domestic league appearances and goals as of January 26, 2010

Nenad Stamenković (Serbian Cyrillic: Ненад Стаменковић; born 7 July 1977) is a Serbian football defender. He last played for FK Radnički Niš in the Serbian SuperLiga.

He retired in summer 2012, and from 2012 to 2015 he was assistant manager to Aleksandar Ilić at FK Radnički Niš.

== Honours ==
- Serbian First League

- Winner (1): 2012
