= Predrag Mijić (politician) =

Politician

Predrag Mijić (Serbian Cyrillic: Предраг Мијић; born 4 June 1970) is a politician in Serbia. He was the mayor of Čoka, Vojvodina, from 2004 to 2011 and served in the Assembly of Vojvodina from 2008 to 2016. Mijić is a member of the Democratic Party (Demokratska stranka, DS).

== Private career ==
Mijić is a veterinarian.

== Politician ==
=== Mayor of Čoka ===
Serbia introduced the direct election of mayors in the 2004 Serbian local elections, and Mijić was elected as mayor of Čoka in the second round of voting. At the time of the election, Čoka did not have a local newspaper, television station, or radio station; Mijić indicated in 2006 that his administration planned to set up local media ventures. The Čokanske hronike journal was launched during his tenure.

Mijić appeared in the 131st position on the DS's electoral list in the 2007 Serbian parliamentary election. The list was sixty-four mandates, and he was not included in his party's delegation. (From 2000 to 2011, mandates in Serbian parliamentary elections were awarded to sponsoring parties or coalitions rather than to individual candidates, and it was common practice for the mandates to be distributed out of numerical order. Mijić could have been awarded a mandate despite his low position on the list, although this ultimately did not happen.)

The direct elections of mayors was abolished with the 2008 local electoral cycle. The Democratic Party won a plurality victory in this election and formed a new government with the Hungarian Coalition; Mijić was appointed to a second term as mayor. In early 2011, he gave an extended interview on the municipality's challenges, including a regional trend of population decline.

=== Assembly of Vojvodina ===
Mijić was elected to the Vojvodina provincial assembly for the Čoka division in the 2008 provincial election. The DS and its allies won a majority victory, and Mijić served as a supporter of the administration. Following a change to Serbia's conflict-of-interest rules in 2011, he was advised that he could not continue his dual mandate as both mayor and a provincial representative; he resigned as mayor shortly thereafter. In the same year, Serbia changed its electoral laws such that mandates in elections held under proportional representation would be awarded to candidates on successful lists in numerical order.

He was re-elected for the Čoka constituency seat in the 2012 provincial election. The DS again led Vojvodina's provincial administration after the election, and Mijić served on the government side. He was also elected to the Čoka municipal assembly in the concurrent 2012 Serbian local elections.

For the 2016 provincial election, Vojvodina adopted a system of full proportional representation. Mijić appeared in the fifty-third position on the DS"s electoral list and was not re-elected when the list won only ten mandates. He was also a (largely nominal) candidate for the DS in Čoka in the 2016 local elections, appearing in the twenty-fourth list position out of twenty-five. The list won three mandates, and he was not returned.

== Electoral record ==
=== Provincial (Vojvodina) ===
2012 Vojvodina assembly election Čoka (constituency seat) - First and Second Rounds
Predrag Mijić (incumbent)	Choice for a Better Vojvodina–Bojan Pajtić (Affiliation: Democratic Party)	1,099	18.23	2,762	50.64
László Kormányos	Alliance of Vojvodina Hungarians	1,544	25.61	2,692	49.36
Stana Đember	League of Social Democrats of Vojvodina–Nenad Čanak	1,011	16.77		
Dragan Pakaški	Socialist Party of Serbia (SPS), Party of United Pensioners of Serbia (PUPS), United Serbia (JS), and Social Democratic Party of Serbia (SDP Serbia) (Affiliation: Socialist Party of Serbia)	966	16.02		
Danijela Nikočev Barat	Let's Get Vojvodina Moving–Tomislav Nikolić (Serbian Progressive Party, New Serbia, Movement of Socialists, Strength of Serbia Movement) (Affiliation: Serbian Progressive Party)	433	7.18		
Zoltan Margit	Hungarian Hope Movement	277	4.59		
Andrija Poljak	U-Turn	259	4.30		
Zoltan Ceneš	Democratic Fellowship of Vojvodina Hungarians	222	3.68		
Savo Stojanović	Serbian Radical Party	218	3.62		
Total valid votes		6,029	100	5,454	100

2008 Vojvodina assembly election Čoka (constituency seat) - First and Second Rounds
Predrag Mijić	"For a European Vojvodina, Democratic Party–G17 Plus, Boris Tadić" (Affiliation: Democratic Party)	1,396	21.07	2,321	56.24
Iboljka Onodi	Hungarian Coalition–István Pásztor	1,621	24.46	1,806	43.76
Stana Đember	Together for Vojvodina–Nenad Čanak	932	14.06		
Vukica Jovanov	Serbian Radical Party	761	11.48		
Aleksandra Sujić (incumbent)	Citizens' Group: For Radical Changes, Knowledge, and Honest Work	572	8.63		
Dušica Božin	Vojvodina's Party	548	8.27		
Zoltan Margit	"Citizens' Group: Margit Zoltan	474	7.15		
Zora Štrbac	"Democratic Party of Serbia–New Serbia–Vojislav Koštunica"	323	4.87		
Total valid votes		6,627	100	4,127	100
Invalid ballots		291		217	
Total votes casts		6,918	65.41	4,344	41.07

=== Municipal (Čoka) ===
2004 Čoka municipal election Mayor of Čoka – First and Second Round Results
Predrag Mijić	Democratic Party	not listed	16.1	2,943	64.10
not listed	Alliance of Vojvodina Hungarians	not listed	19.6	1,648	35.90
not listed	Serbian Radical Party	eliminated in the first round	14.8		
not listed	G17 Plus	eliminated in the first round	13.5		
not listed	League of Social Democrats of Vojvodina	eliminated in the first round	12.7		
not listed	Strength of Serbia Movement	eliminated in the first round	10.0		
not listed	independent candidates	eliminated in the first round	9.3		
not listed	Democratic Fellowship of Vojvodina Hungarians	eliminated in the first round	4.2		
Total valid votes		not listed	100	4,591	100
