= Dejan Stamenković (footballer, born 1990) =

Serbian footballer

Personal information
- Full name: Dejan Stamenković
- Date of birth: 8 August 1990 (age 36)
- Place of birth: Niš, SFR Yugoslavia
- Height: 1.75 m (5 ft 9 in)
- Position: Attacking midfielder

Senior career*
Years	Team	Apps	(Gls)
2008–2012	Car Konstantin	16	(2)
2009–2010	→ Sinđelić Niš (loan)	2	(0)
2012	→ Srem (loan)	5	(1)
2012	Žitorađa	12	(3)
2013	Tërbuni Pukë	8	(2)
2013–2014	Žitorađa	22	(1)
2015-2018	Víðir	54	(5)
2019-2020	Sinđelić Niš		
2020-2021	Jedinstvo Gornji Matejevac		
2021-2022	Stevan Nešticki		
2022-2023	Sinđelić Niš		
- * Club domestic league appearances and goals as of 1 November 2018

Dejan Stamenković (Serbian Cyrillic: Дејан Стаменковић; born 8 August 1990) is a Serbian football midfielder.
