= Nenad Nenadović =

Serbian actor and television host (1964–2021)

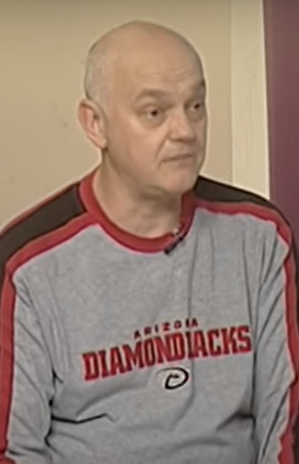
- Nenadović in 2015
- Born: 20 October 1964; Belgrade, SFR Yugoslavia
- Died: 22 September 2021 (aged 56); Belgrade, Serbia
- Occupations: actor, television host
- Years active: 1977–2021

Nenad Nenadović (Serbian Cyrillic: Ненад Ненадовић; 20 October 1964 – 22 September 2021) was a Serbian film, television, voice and stage actor as well as a television host.

== Life and career ==
Born in Belgrade, he was a notable member of Boško Buha Theatre from 1987. As of February 2019, he played 3,100 plays in Boško Buha Theatre which makes him a record holder. During his career, he had about 50 film and TV roles. He hosted a large number of TV shows including ones for children. He gave the voice to Goku in the Serbian version of Dragon Ball Z.

Nenadović died from COVID-19 on 22 September 2021, at the age of 56.
