= Dejan Stamenković (footballer, born 1983) =

Serbian footballer

Personal information
- Date of birth: 14 February 1983 (age 43)
- Place of birth: Belgrade, SFR Yugoslavia
- Height: 1.87 m (6 ft 1 1/2 in)
- Position: Defender

Team information
- Current team: Jedinstvo Ub (assistant)

Youth career
- Partizan

Senior career*
Years	Team	Apps	(Gls)
2001–2003	Železničar Beograd	8	(1)
2003–2005	Voždovac	27	(1)
2005–2007	Palilulac Beograd		
2006	→ Hajduk Beograd (loan)	16	(2)
2006–2007	→ Polet Novi Karlovci (loan)		
2007–2008	INON	20	(2)
2008–2009	Jagodina	0	(0)
2008–2011	Mladost Lučani	75	(7)
2011–2012	Metalac Gornji Milanovac	23	(1)
2012–2013	Čukarički	42	(1)
2014	Borac Čačak	9	(0)
2015	Kolubara	13	(0)
2016	Radnički Obrenovac		
2016–2017	Prva Iskra Barič		
2017–2018	Jedinstvo Ub		

Managerial career
- 2019: Jedinstvo Ub
- 2020–: Jedinstvo Ub (assistant)
- * Club domestic league appearances and goals

Dejan Stamenković (Serbian Cyrillic: Дејан Стаменковић; born 14 February 1983) is a Serbian football coach and a former player. He is an assistant coach with Jedinstvo Ub.
