= Colonia (group) =

Croatian dance music duo

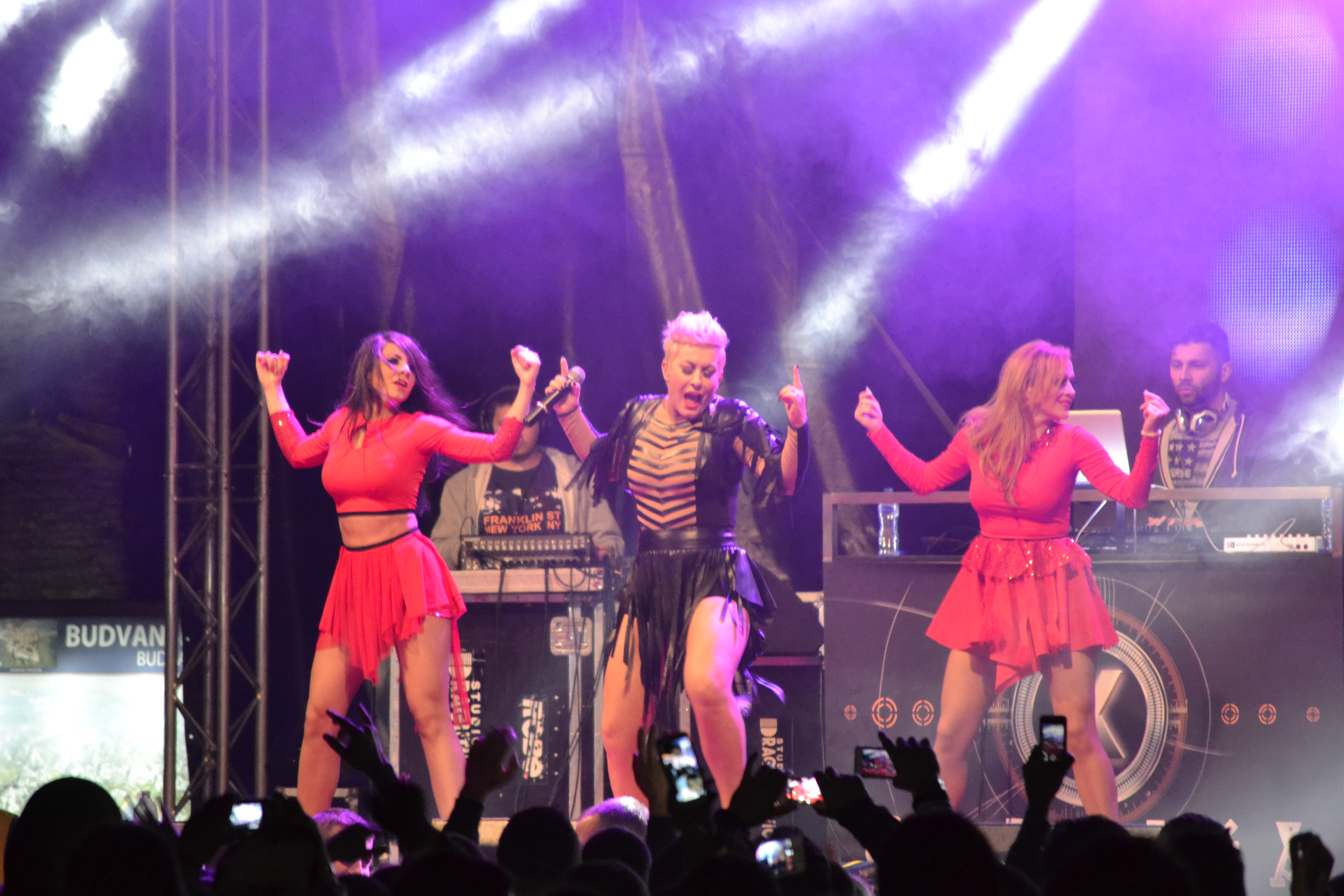
- Colonia in 2015

Background information
- Origin: Vinkovci, Croatia
- Genres: Eurodance; house; dance-pop
- Years active: 1996–present
- Labels: Crno-Bijeli Svijet; Croatia; Menart; City; Hayat Production
- Members: Boris Đurđević; Ivana Lovrić
- Past members: Tomislav Jelić; Indira Levak

Colonia is a Croatian dance music duo from Vinkovci, Croatia. The band has released thirteen albums and over 35 singles to date with various songs and albums gaining platinum status. They are known for winning the first ever Eurodance competition in 2001 and their various hits throughout the years.

Colonia is considered to be one of the best selling musical artists in Croatia, having their albums sold in Russia, Ukraine, Kazakhstan, Slovakia, and the Czech Republic and their music had a major impact on Croatia's pop music of late 90s and early 00s.

== History ==
=== 1996–1997: Beginnings and Vatra i led ===
Colonia was founded in 1996 by Boris Đurđević and Tomislav Jelić, two DJs from Vinkovci, Croatia. As the two of them did not sing, they later hired Indira "Ira" Vladić (from Županja) to become their vocalist. The name of the group comes from the ancient Latin name of Vinkovci, which was "Colonia Aurelia Cibalae".

The first commercial release by the group was "Nek' vatre gore sve" in 1996. The song was sent to radio stations all over Croatia and enjoyed moderate success. The next single released was "Sve oko mene je grijeh" which charted on the Croatian national charts and became a hit. Colonia soon signed with the record company Crno-bijeli svijet (CBS), which facilitated the release of their 1997 debut album Vatra i led (Fire and ice) which sold over 40,000 copies.

=== 1998–2001: Dora and Croatia Records ===
In 1998, Colonia entered HRT Dora, the Croatian national final for the Eurovision Song Contest with hopes to be the Croatian representative at the yearly song contest. At the final, held on March 6, 1998, the group placed fourth with the song "U ritmu ljubavi" having gained 87 points. The voting was tallied using 20 juries, one from each Croatian province, and a 21st jury consisting of viewer televoting. A few months later, Colonia won a prize for the song "Lady Blue" at Melodije hrvatskog Jadrana (Melodies of the Adriatic), an annual music festival. Then in 1999, Colonia released their next single "Njeno ime ne zovi u snu" and soon after their second studio album Ritam ljubavi (Rhythm of Love).

Colonia soon became one of the best selling musical groups in Croatia, and switched record labels, signing with Croatia Records. With Croatia Records, Colonia released their third studio album titled Jača nego ikad (Stronger than ever) which is their first album to be released in all Former Yugoslav republics. The album Jača nego ikad has sold in 60,000 units. The song "Budi mi zbogom" was entered into the Croatian Radio Festival where it won second place and a cover version of "Deja vu" by the Japanese group KinKi Kids had great success in Asia reaching #1 on the charts. "Sexy Body" became a dance floor hit, was released in 2001 by Balloon Records in Austria on a compilation album and entered the DJ dance charts.

Colonia's fourth studio album Milijun milja od nigdje (A million miles from nowhere) was released in 2001 and sold over 60,000 copies in Croatia and over 300,000 worldwide making it the best-selling album in Croatia. The album was also released in all Former Yugoslav republics. The single "Za tvoje snene oči" won the Croatian Radio Festival and became a summer hit and the most played song in 2001. The song was also entered into the first annual "Eurodance" contest in 2001 where it became the first winner. The album was later re-released as a thank you to fans as an LP with the original songs and new remixes.

=== 2002–2003: Continued success ===
In 2002, Colonia released their fifth album Izgubljeni svijet (Lost world) which features 13 new tracks and a DVD with their biography, discography, and music videos. The single "Oduzimaš mi dah" won the Croatian Radio Festival and became their second single in a row to become the most played song of the year in 2002. A few months later, The Best of, Volume 1 was released which included all of the hits and singles by the group.

In 2003, the album Dolazi oluja (The storm is coming) was released and its first single "C'est la vie" won the Croatian Radio Festival, Colonia's third win in a row. Milijun milja od nigdje and Izgubljeni Svijet were released in Slovakia and the Czech Republic where they reached number on the music charts. In December 2003, Colonia received three "Music Box" awards, one for "Best International Performer" and two for "Best Song". Both albums were released in all Former Yugoslav republics, though Izgubljeni svijet was released only as an audio CD in these countries.

=== 2004: International releases ===
In January 2004, an English version of "Za tvoje snene oči" was released as "A Little Bit of Uh La La" with lyrics by Mary Susan Applegate, who had previously written for Celine Dion, La Bouche, and No Mercy. The song was released in vinyl, as a CD single, and on numerous compilations albums in over 36 countries. "A Little Bit of Uh La La" was also popular on the charts reaching number one on the Canadian Dance Chart. In Summer 2004, "Za tvoje snene oči", "Ti da bu di bu da" and "Deja vu" were released in Korea on the compilation albums Volcano, Beatman and Dancemania. Also in 2004, the singles "Luda za tobom" and "Običan dan" were released from the Dolazi oluja album.

Đurđević also contributed the music for the winner's song of TV talent show Hrvatski Idol, titled "Treba mi snage za kraj" (I Need Strength For The End) released by its winner Žanamari and released to radio on 6 June 2004 plus appearing on her eponymous album in 2005. Also performed and recorded-but-unreleased by that show's runner-up, Pamela Ramljak.

=== 2005–2006: Najbolje od svega ===
In 2005, Colonia ended their contract with Croatia Records, releasing "Gold Edition", a double disc compilation of hits and remixes, and also after releasing their new album Najbolje od svega (The best from everything) under their new record label Menart. Najbolje od svega came close to reaching platinum certification. It features 13 new tracks including the hits "Najbolje od svega" and "Tako Sexy" along with remixes of both "Nema nade" and "Time". The album was also released in Russia, Ukraine, Kazakhstan, Slovakia, and the Czech Republic. Najbolje od svega was the first album in six years not to be released in all Former Yugoslav republics, though it still fared well in their charts.

During Summer 2006, Colonia went on a tour with the name "Gastro club turneja" promoting Najbolje od svega, playing in 22 cities. The tour started on July 19, 2006, in Umag, Croatia and ended on October 15, 2006, in Dubrovnik, Croatia.

Colonia's last album with Croatia Records was Gold Edition, a compilation album containing their popular hits from their career at Croatia Records such as "Za tvoje snene oči", "Oduzimaš mi dah" and "Plamen od ljubavi". The album also includes 13 previously unreleased remixes.

=== 2006–2007: Do kraja ===
On December 5, 2006, Colonia released their eighth studio album Do kraja (Until the end), a modern dance album with Balkan and Croatian elements, after signing with Menart Records. In 2007, Do kraja, first single from the album was released and it topped the Croatian and Slovenian charts, while another one of their songs was chosen as the main theme for the Croatian version of Big Brother. Colonia performed on the show on October 19, 2007, as promotion for both the song and album. The song was also entered in "Eurodance 2007" where it placed 16th out of 41. The album Do kraja has sold in 50,000 units.

The single "Pogledom me skini" was released with three remixes and music video. The song competed in the Croatian national selection for the OGAE Song Contest 2007, coming in fourth with 32 points. The contest is similar to the Eurovision Song Contest, but run by OGAE, the official fan club.

Colonia released the last single "Fjaka" from the album and it reached number two on the Croatian charts becoming a summer hit and then on July 3, 2007, the group released a limited edition of Do kraja with a second disc featuring eight new remixes. Following the release of the last single, Colonia went on tour throughout Croatia and its bordering countries performing 17 concerts from June 6 to August 25, 2007. With the release of Do kraja, Colonia renewed their contract with Serbian label City Records and HAYAT Records of Bosnia and Herzegovina.

=== 2008: Pod sretnom zvijezdom ===
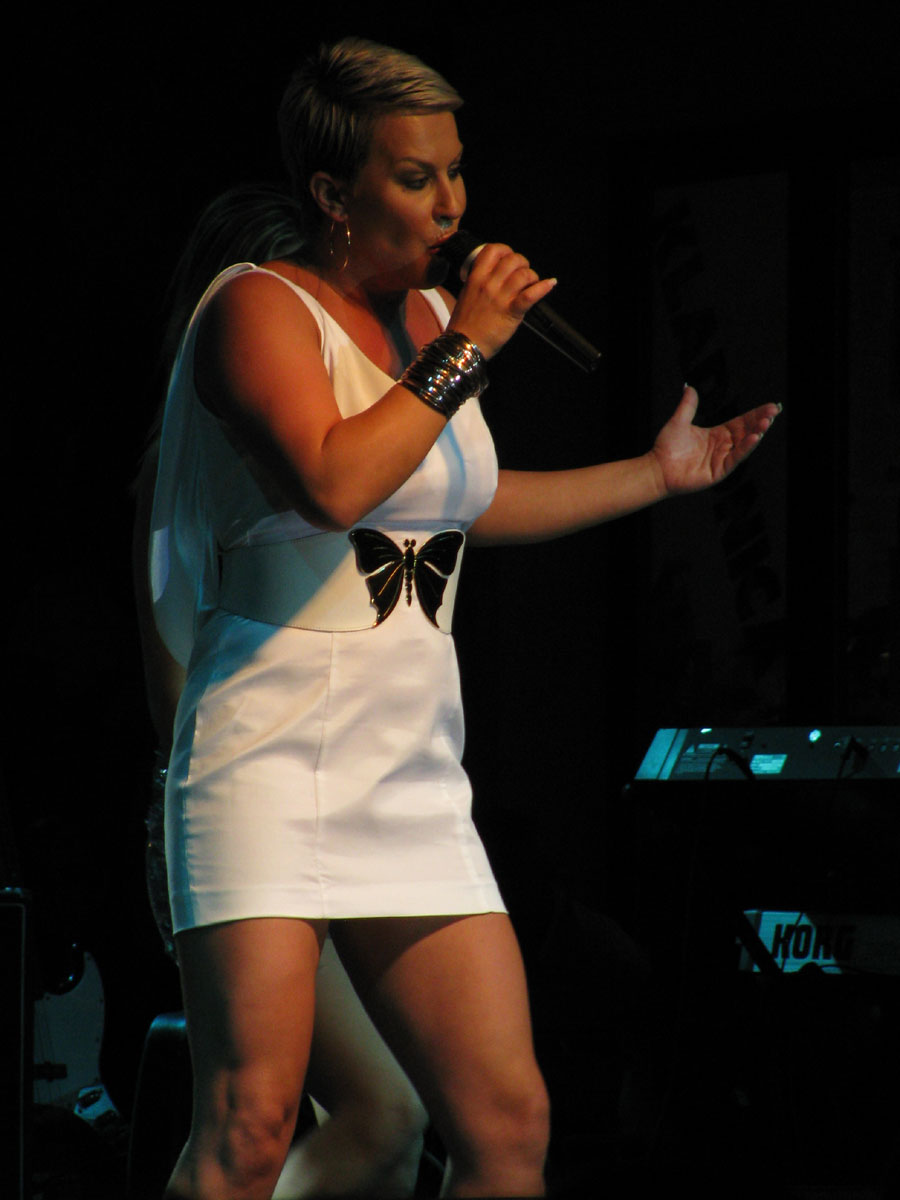
Lead vocal of the group, Indira Levak in Jelsa, Croatia (August 30, 2008)

On October 3, 2007, "Pod sretnom zvijezdom" was released to radio stations throughout Croatia as the first single from the upcoming album Pod sretnom zvijezdom and as a theme song for 2007 season of Big Brother (Croatia). The second single from the album, "Mirno more", was released on May 17, 2008, where it was performed at the "CMC Awards". On June 23, 2008, Colonia released its ninth studio album titled Pod sretnom zvijezdom (Under a lucky star) which features 12 new tracks and a remix of "Sexy Body". The album has sold in 100,000 units. It was soon re-released as Pod sretnom zvijezdom: Limited Edition on December 8, 2008, and included a second disk with the single "Avantura zove me" from Big Brother and two remixes of it, along with ten remixes of other album songs.

=== 2008–2018 ===
Between 2008 and 2017, the band has remained active, and they have released 3 more albums; X (Ten) in 2010, Tvrđava (Fortress) in 2013, and Fenix (Phoenix) in 2015. Both Tvrđava and Fenix has sold in 50,000 units. After 2015, the band was a little less active than in previous years.

On May 31, 2017, popular Croatian newspapers Večernji list has announced that Indira Levak has left the band. At that time, it was still speculated whether the band will announce a new singer, or will completely cease to exist.

On June 14, 2017, Croatian news portal Direktno has published an article, stating that the Boris Đurđević has announced a new singer, a 25 years old student of electronics, Ivana Lovrić.

Following the announcement, the band has released their first single with a new singer on July 27, 2017: Que sera. It was followed by the second single Zadnja suza on March 6, 2018.

Colonia's new album Nova Era (New Era) was released on June 1, 2018.

== Discography ==
=== Studio albums ===
- Vatra i led (1997)
- Ritam ljubavi (1999)
- Jača nego ikad (2000)
- Milijun milja od nigdje (2001)
- Izgubljeni svijet (2002)
- Dolazi oluja (2003)
- Najbolje od svega (2005)
- Do kraja (2006)
- Pod sretnom zvijezdom (2008)
- X (2010)
- Tvrđava (2013)
- Feniks (2015)
- Nova era (2018)
- Doza (2025)

=== Compilation albums ===
- Gold Edition (2005)
- Retroactive Early Years (2010)
- The Best Of Collection (2014)
- C'est la vie (2019)

== Members ==
Boris Đurđević became a DJ in Vinkovci in the early 1990s. Other than his involvement in Colonia, he was later the author of theme songs for the Croatian version of Big Brother reality show and as the songwriter for the Hrvatski Idol winner's single "Treba mi snage za kraj" (I Need Strength For The End).

Tomislav Jelić is known as DJ Kameny, and had previously worked at the local hit radio station VFM in Vinkovci.

Indira Vladić attended a music school as a child, and played clarinet in the local tin band. In 1993 she took the job in County General Administration Office and spent four years there until being approached by Boris Đurđević and offered a job in Colonia. She was married to Narcis Mujkić. They divorced in 2010, after nine years of marriage.

Ivana Lovrić joined the band in mid-2017. She was first noticed by Luka Nižetić with whom she also recorded a duet song.
