= Feminnem discography =

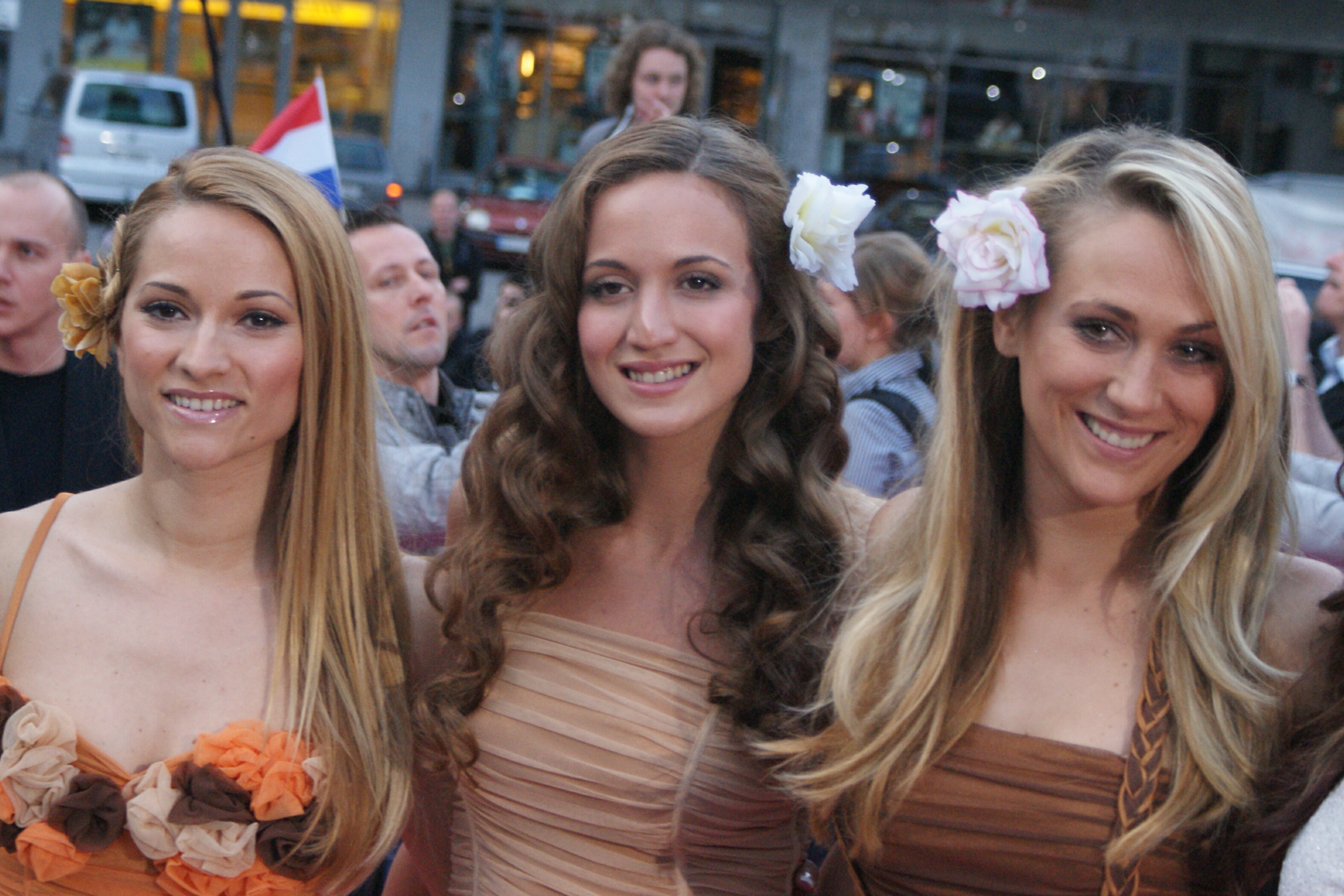
- Feminnem in 2010
- Studio albums: 3
- Compilation albums: 1
- Singles: 20
- Music videos: 17

The discography of pop girl band Feminnem consists of three studio albums, one compilation and 19 singles. The most popular singles are "Volim te, mrzim te", "2 srca 1 ljubav", "Call Me", "Sve što ostaje", "Lako je sve" and "Sve što ti nisam znala dati".

In December 2005, Feminnem released their debut album Feminnem Show. The album spawned four official singles and a promotional single. Their second album, Lako je sve, was released on 1 March 2010. It is their only album to include songs from all part members. Lako je sve also includes the song of the same name which represented Croatia in the Eurovision Song Contest 2010.

In May 2022, the group launched a comeback and has since then scored three HR Top 40 top ten singles. Among them, "Trending", featuring rapper Alejuandro Buendija, was the highest charting one by peaking at number six in Croatia.

== Albums ==
=== Studio albums ===
Title	Album details	Peak chart positions
Title	Album details	CRO
Feminnem Show	Released: 20 December 2005; Label: Croatia Records; Formats: CD, digital download	(Note: Top of the Shops was launched in 2002 but a partial archive is only available from 2006 onwards.)
Lako je sve	Released: 1 March 2010; Label: Croatia Records; Formats: CD, digital download	2
Easy to See	Released: 4 June 2010; Label: DA Records; Formats: digital download	—
"—" denotes releases that did not chart or were not released in that territory.

=== Compilation albums ===
Title	Album details	Peak chart positions
Title	Album details	CRO
Baš nam je dobro	Released: 23 December 2010; Label: Croatia Records; Formats: CD, digital download	6
"—" denotes releases that did not chart or were not released in that territory.

== Singles ==
=== As lead artist ===
Title	Year	Peak chart positions	Album
Title	Year	CRO	Album
"Volim te, mrzim te"	2004	(Note: HR Top 40 was launched on 24 January 2013.)	Feminnem Show
"Call Me"	2005	(Note: HR Top 40 was launched on 24 January 2013.)	Feminnem Show
"Reci nešto, al' ne šuti više"	2005	(Note: HR Top 40 was launched on 24 January 2013.)	Feminnem Show
"2 srca 1 ljubav"	2006	(Note: HR Top 40 was launched on 24 January 2013.)	Feminnem Show
"Navika"	2007	(Note: HR Top 40 was launched on 24 January 2013.)	Lako je sve
"Chanel 5"	2008	(Note: HR Top 40 was launched on 24 January 2013.)	Lako je sve
"Ovisna"	2008	(Note: HR Top 40 was launched on 24 January 2013.)	Lako je sve
"Poljupci u boji"	2009	(Note: HR Top 40 was launched on 24 January 2013.)	Lako je sve
"Oye, oye, oye" (featuring Alex Manga)	2009	(Note: HR Top 40 was launched on 24 January 2013.)	Lako je sve
"Sve što ostaje"	2009	(Note: HR Top 40 was launched on 24 January 2013.)	Lako je sve
"Lako je sve"	2010	(Note: HR Top 40 was launched on 24 January 2013.)	Lako je sve
"Baš mi je dobro"	2010	(Note: HR Top 40 was launched on 24 January 2013.)	Lako je sve
"Sve što ti nisam znala dati"	2011	(Note: HR Top 40 was launched on 24 January 2013.)	Non-album singles
"Subota bez tebe"	2011	(Note: HR Top 40 was launched on 24 January 2013.)	Non-album singles
"Zajedno"	2022	9	Non-album singles
"Ima li nas sutra"	2022	10	Non-album singles
"Trending" (featuring Alejuandro Buendija)	2023	6	Non-album singles
"Tri slatke riječi te"	2023	—	Non-album singles
"—" denotes releases that did not chart or were not released in that territory.

==== Promotional singles ====
Title	Year	Album
"Vino na usnama"	2006	Feminnem Show
"Pusti, pusti modu" (featuring Maja Šuput)	2007	Baš nam je dobro

=== As featured artist ===
Title	Year	Album
"Ruka dobrote" (with other various artist)	2011	Charity single

== Music videos ==
Title	Year	Director(s)	Ref.
"Volim te, mrzim te"	2004	—	
"Call Me"	2005	Branko Vekić	
"Zovi"	2005	Branko Vekić	
"Reci nešto, al' ne šuti više"	2005	Darko Drinovac	
"2 srca 1 ljubav"	2006	—	
"Navika"	2007	Darko Drinovac	
"Chanel 5"	2008	Darko Drinovac	
"Ovisna"	2008	—	
"Oye, oye, oye" (with Alex Manga)	2009	—	
"Sve što ostaje"	2009	Darko Drinovac	
"Lako je sve"	2010	Gonzo	
"Baš mi je dobro"	2010	—	
"Sve što ti nisam znala dati"	2011	Gonzo	
"Ruka dobrote" (with other various artist)	2011	Milo Ostović	
"Subota bez tebe"	2011	Tomislav Pović	
"Zajedno"	2022	Sandra Mihaljević	
"Ima li nas sutra"	2022	Sandra Mihaljević	
"Trending"	2023	Sandra Mihaljević	
