= Magazin =

Croatian musical group

- The original group members left to right; Željko Baričić, Ljiljana Nikolovska, Nenad Vesanović and Tonči Huljić.

Background information
- Also known as: Mladi Batali (1979); Dalmatinski Magazin (1979–1982)
- Origin: Split, Croatia
- Genres: Pop
- Years active: 1979–present
- Labels: Jugoton/Croatia; Orfej HRT; Tonika
- Members: Željko Baričić; Nenad "Keko" Vesanović; Lorena Bućan
- Past members: Tonči Huljić; Ivan Huljić; Miro Crnko; Igor Biočić; Zoran Marinković; Ante Miletić; Vocals: Majda Šoletić (1st singer); Marija Kuzmić (2nd singer); Ljiljana Nikolovska (3rd singer); Danijela Martinović (4th singer); Jelena Rozga (5th singer); Ivana Kovač (6th singer); Andrea Šušnjara (7th singer)

Magazin is a Croatian pop band from Split. Founded in 1979 under the name Dalmatinski magazin ("Dalmatian Magazine" in Croatian), the band quickly began to make a mark on local pop music festivals with its songs influenced by Dalmatian folk music. One of the most prominent bands in Yugoslavia and one of the longest lasting, with 45 years active in the music industry in Croatia and former Yugoslavia.

The band currently consists of lead vocalist Lorena Bućan, guitarist Željko Baričić and bass guitarist Nenad "Keko" Vesanović. Baričić is the only active founding member even though Vesanović featured on every album to date.

== History ==
=== Founding and first musical success (1979–1986) ===
In 1979, the band Magazin, then under the name "Mladi batali", was founded by Željko Baričić, Zoran Marinković, Miro Crnko, Igor Biočić and vocalist Majda Šoletić in Split then Yugoslavia. That same year, they signed a record deal with the record company Jugoton and recorded their first LP singles, but also changed the band's name to "Dalmatinski magazin". At the end of the same year, the band gained two new members, Tonči Huljić and Nenad Vesanović Keko.

In early 1982, Majda Šoletić left the band, and was replaced by Marija Kuzmić. That same year, the band changed their name to "Magazin" and recorded their first album Slatko stanje (Sweet State), and performed at the Split Festival with the song "Dišpetožo moja mala", where they won the first prize of the professional jury. At the end of the year, they performed at the Zagrebfest with the song "Moja mala mila".

=== National success with Ljiljana Nikolovska (1986 – 1990) ===
Their gradual rise in popularity continued in the 1980s with a series of prestigious festival victories. Their peak of popularity was reached when Marija Kuzmić left the group due to family reasons and was replaced by Split born singer of Macedonian descent Ljiljana Nikolovska who became the band's lead singer. The leader and songwriter Tonči Huljić began to insert elements of folk music of other European countries in his songs. On Split Festival '83 they performed Kokolo off of their album Kokolo which was released in December. The album was sold in 270,000 copies and was Platinum certified. Drummer Zoran Marinković left the band in 1984, and was replaced by Ante Miletić. The band performed at the Split Festival that same year with the song "Nikola", and then released their third album, O, la, la. In 1985, they performed with the song "Vrati mi, vrati sve" at the Split Festival, and with the song "Piši mi" ("Write to me") at the Zagrebfest, where despite receiving by far the largest number of audience votes, Magazin did not win due to a set-up. In protest at the ceremony announcing the winner, the band refused to go on stage and accept the second prize from the audience, and the outraged visitors left the Lisinski Hall in large numbers, with loud protests and whistles. Tonči Huljić started collaborating with songwriters from other parts of Yugoslavia such as Marina Tucaković who wrote many of Magazin's songs. In 1985 they released their fourth album Piši mi (Write to Me), with their most prominent songs like: "Tamara", "Oko moje sanjivo", "Piši mi" & "Istambul". The album 'Piši mi' got a diamond certification, because it was sold in 380,000 copies and is considered their best album and their masterpiece of Croatian pop music. It was recorded in Zagreb at Janko Mlinarić's studio Truli. It was the beginning of a long-term collaboration with arranger and producer Mate Došen. At the Split Festival in 1986, they won the second award of the audience with the song 'Ne mogu da ga ne volim'. At the Zagreb Fest in 1986, the song 'Piši mi' received recognition for the most performed song from the previous festival. In early December of the same year, the album Put putujem (The path I travel) was released, for which they received the "Zlatna Ptica" ('Golden Bird') award for more than 670,000 copies of the album sold and it's considered to be one of the best selling albums in Yugoslavia.

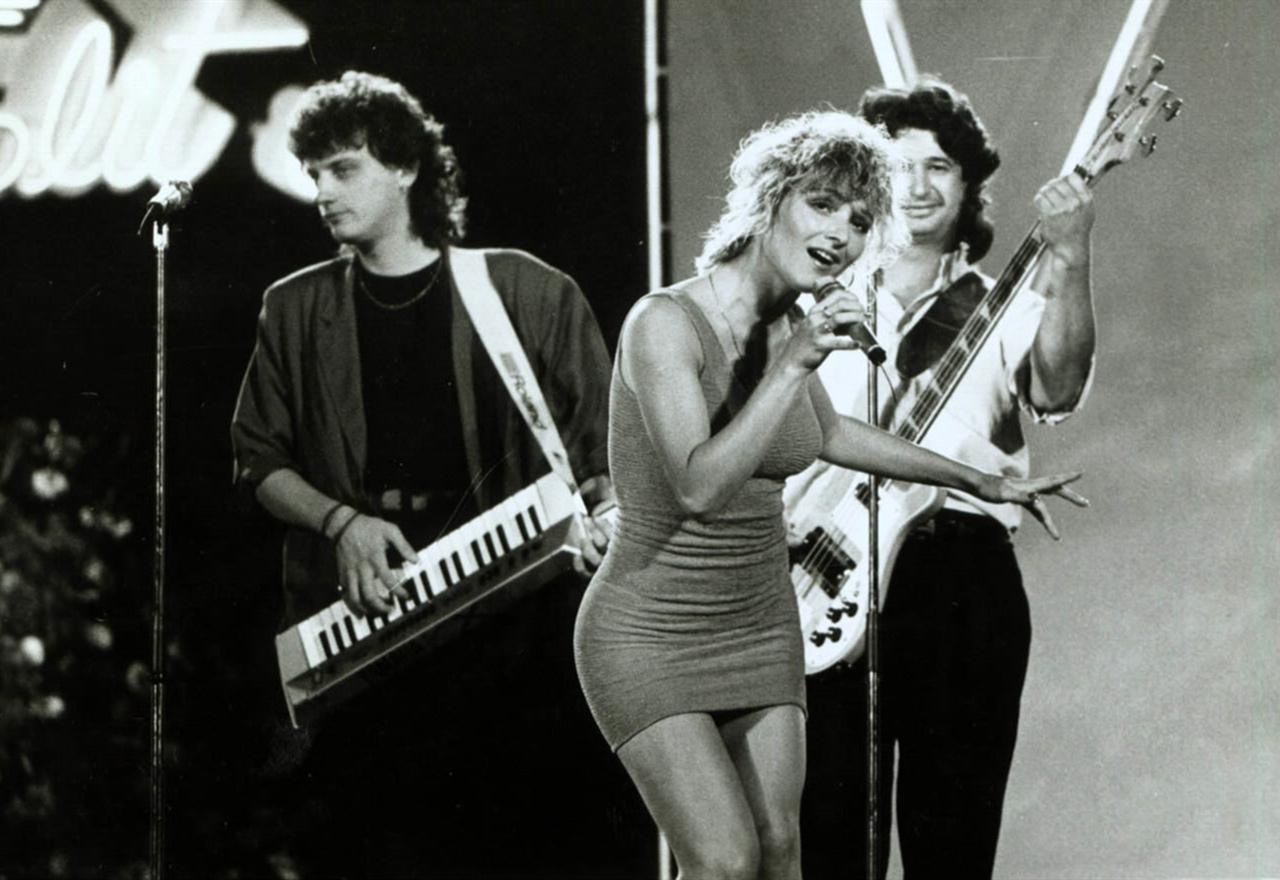
Magazin in 1980s with Ljiljana Nikolovska and Tonči Huljić

In 1987, the band went on a major tour of Yugoslavia, and at the end of the year they released the self-titled album Magazin, which sold more than 500,000 copies and for which they received the "Zlatna ptica" award. The album was written by Nenad Ninčević, Zvonimir (Zvonko) Stipičić and their previous collaborator Marina Tucaković who wrote: "Ti si želja mog života" and "Tri sam ti zime šaptala ime". In 1988, they released their seventh album Besane Noći (Sleepless nights), which got a diamond certification, sold in more than 200,000 copies and the following year (1989) they released the album Dobro jutro (Good Morning), the last album with vocals by Ljiljana Nikolovska, which got another diamond certification and equivalent of more than 200,000 copies. At the end of 1990, a large compilation "Svi najveći hitovi 1983-1990" (All the greatest hits 1983-1990) was released with 26 of the best songs of the group Magazin, sung by Ljiljana Nikolovska. After this compilation and due to war that occurred in Croatia, she left the group and relocated to San Pedro, California where she still resides.

=== Departure of Ljiljana Nikolovska, and new singer Danijela Martinović (1991 – 1996) ===
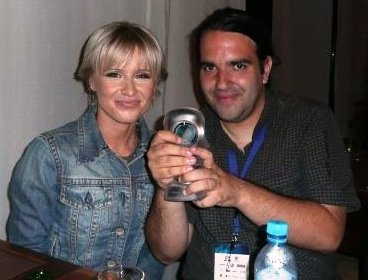
Danijela Martinović, 2011

In 1991, instead of Ljiljana Nikolovska, the lead singer became Danijela Martinović who became popular during Split Festival, where she met Tonči Huljić. In 1991 they released their 9th album as a group and first with Danijela titled Da mi te zaljubit' u mene (If I could make you fall in love with me). Tonči Huljić kept on collaborating with Marina Tucaković who wrote "Djana", "Ostani nježan do kraja", "Ustani", "Svi igrači", "Tišina" and most notable song from that album “Bilo bi super”. On that album they recorded an anti-war song "Mir, mir, mir do neba" ("Peace, peace, peace to the sky"), and in the same year, keyboard player Miro Crnko leaves the band for family reasons. In 1993, they released a new album Došlo vrijeme (Time has come) and performed at the Melodije Hrvatskog Jadrana festival with the song "Neću se vratiti" ("I will not return"). The following year, they performed again at the Melodije Hrvatskog Jadrana with the song "Simpatija", a duet with Marija Bubić and won the Grand Prix of the festival. In the same year, they released the album Simpatija (Simpathy), which was published by Croatia Records and reached a gold certification. In 1995, Magazin with opera singer Lidija Horvat-Dunjko performed "Nostalgija" in the Dora contest, Croatian pre-selection for Eurovision Song Contest, and won. They represented Croatia with their song "Nostalgija" in the Eurovision Song Contest 1995 and finished sixth.

=== Departure of Danijela Martinović, and new success with Jelena Rozga (1996 – 2006) ===
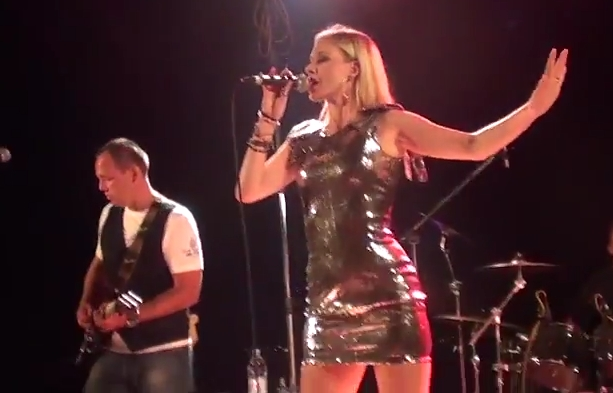
Jelena Rozga, who was the lead singer of the band for 10 years

In 1996, Danijela Martinović left the band to start a solo career, and Jelena Rozga took her place. In 1995, Tonči Huljić started looking for a new singer for the group, who was supposed to replace Danijela Martinović. Tonči and Jelena's mother Marija arranged an audition. Jelena sang the songs "Opusti se" and "Zlato ljubavi" in a restaurant in Zagreb, after which she was accepted into the group. Jelena first performed on Dora under her own name, performing the song "Aha" and won second place, and only later on Melodije hrvatskog Jadrana in 1996, she made her debut as a singer of the group Magazin with the song "Suze biserne". At the age of 19, Jelena became the band's new and youngest singer.

In the same year, an album called Nebo boje moje ljubavi (The sky the colour of my love) was released, which included the big hits: "Suze biserne", "Minut srca tvog", "Nebo boje moje ljubavi" and "Samo navika" collaboration with Croatian singer Oliver Dragojević. The album achieved a gold circulation in Croatia. The year 1997 was marked by a performance on Dora with the song "Opijum", and after that a performance on Melodije hrvatskog Jadrana '97 with the song "Ime mi spominje". Two years after the album Nebo boje moje ljubavi, in 1998, the album Da si ti ja (If you were me) was released. The mentioned album also contained numerous successful songs, including: "Gutljaj vina", "Ginem", "Briga me", "Na svijetu sve", "Idi i ne budi lude", "Luna", "Na Sve Svete" and "Opijum". With the song "Na svijetu sve", the group competed at the Dora in 1998, and with the song "Idi i ne budi ljude" at the Melodije Hrvatskog Jadrana in 1998. The album reached platinum circulation in Croatia and Slovenia.

At Dora 1999, the group competed with the song "Kasno je", and at Melodije Hrvatskog Jadrana with the song "Ako poludim". After the album "Da si ti ja", the album Minus i plus was released in 2000. In addition to the aforementioned song of the same name, the album also includes hits such as: "Jel' zbog nje", "Kasno je", "Nemam snage da se pomirim" and "Ako poludim". In 2002, Magazin with Jelena Rozga released their 15th album S druge strane Mjeseca (From the other side of the Moon). The album continued the success of the previous albums and included numerous successful songs such as: "S druge strane Mjeseca", "Ne vjerujem tebi, ne vjerujem sebi", "Dani su bez broja" collaboration with Macedonian singer Esma Redžepova which was internationally successful and "'Ko me zove".

The album with the symbolic name Paaa..? (Sooo..?) released in 2004 is the last album of the Magazin group with Jelena as the lead vocalist. Like the previous albums, the album was a great commercial success and contained numerous hits such as the songs: "Ne tiče me se", "Troši i uživaj", "Kad bi bio bizu" and "Da li znaš da te ne volim". At the Radio Festival in 2003, the group performed the song "Kad bi bio blizu", and at the Split Festival the same year, the song "Da li znaš da te ne volim". A year later, the group performed the song "Ne tiče me se" at the Split Festival and won the festival at the same time. After almost five years of absence, Magazin returned to Dora with the song "Nazaret" in 2005 and won second place, and a year later they performed at the same contest with the song "Oprosti mala". At the same time, this performance is considered to be the last performance of the group with Jelena Rozga as a vocalist. The almost ten years Jelena was a member of the Magazin group is considered one of the most successful and productive periods of the group. In addition to successful songs and albums, the Magazin group also held large concert tours with Jelena as a singer. Thus, concerts were held in Belgrade's Sava Centar in 2002 and 2004, while in 2000 a concert was held in Sarajevo's Skenderija. Jelena left the band in 2006 to focus on her solo career.

=== Departure of Jelena Rozga, and new singers Ivana Kovač and Andrea Šušnjara (2006 - 2024) ===
As Jelena Rozga stepped out of the band to continue her solo career, the band made a special Live TV competition-audition program on HRT in 2006 to choose a new singer who is going to replace Jelena Rozga. Among those singers were Lidija Bačić, Andrea Šušnjara, Lea Mijatović, Slavica Buzov, Nikol Bulat and Zorana Kačić. The girls took turns and sang in front of the jury, which included the leader of the band Tonči Huljić, singer and songwriter Đorđe Novković, Mirko Fodor and Duško Ćurlić. However, in the end, none of them became the new singer of the group, but the new vocal became Ivana Kovač, daughter of Croatian music legend Mišo Kovač. In the same year, they released the album Dama i car.

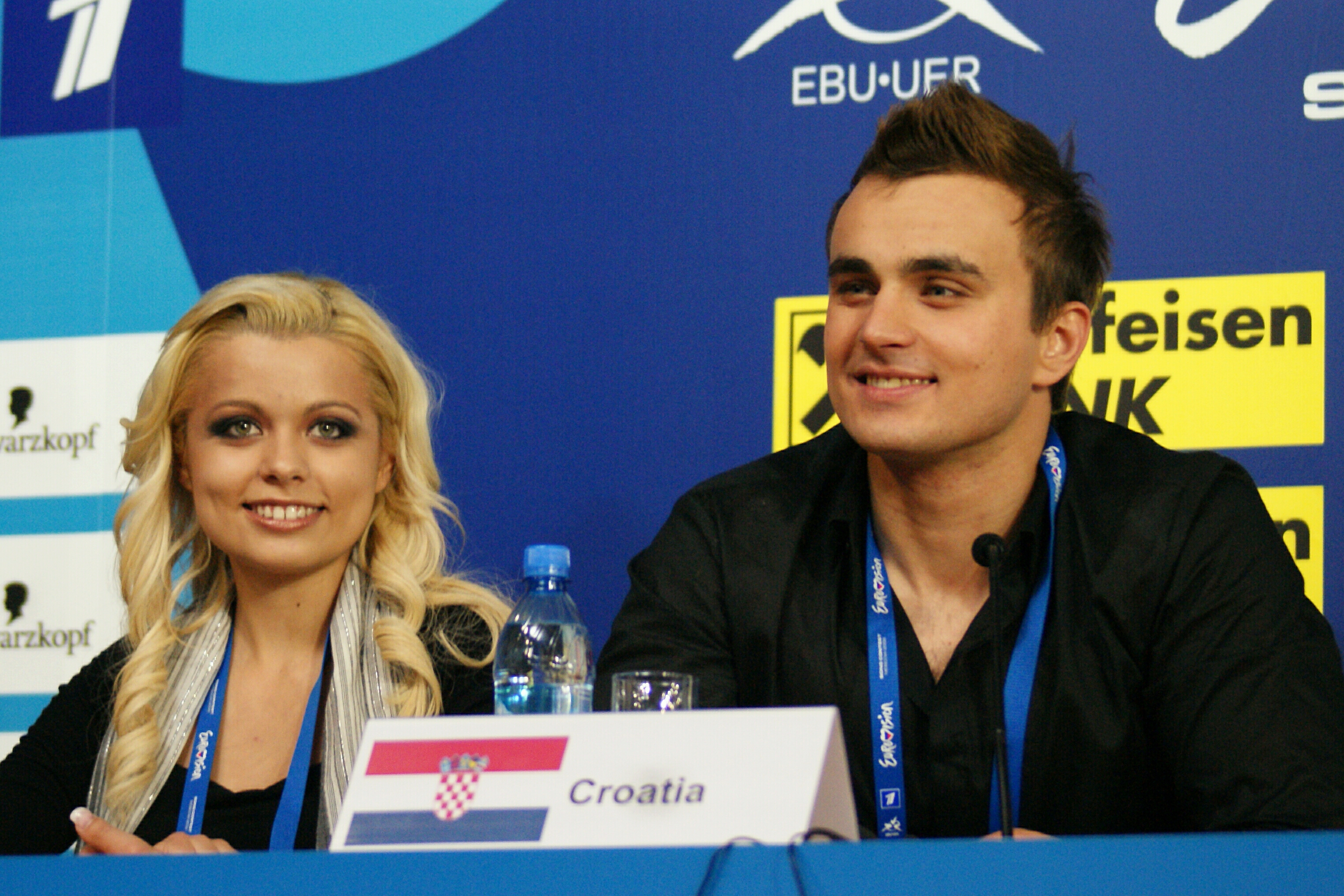
Andrea Šušnjara with Igor Cukrov, (pictured in 2009)

In 2010, Andrea Šušnjara, who was one of the girls from the HRT audition, became the new singer of the group. Magazin together with Andrea released the debut single "Sijamski blizanci" ("Siamese twins"), which immediately became a huge success in Croatia and internationally. After "Sijamski blizanci", they released the hits; "Kemija", "Još se ne bi udala", "Maslačak", "Luzer", "Muško bez karaktera", "Dušu nemaš da me na njoj nosiš", "Jutro nakon", "Školovana da preživim", "Doktore", "Ima dana" and many others. Šušnjara became the longest lasting main vocalist of the band lasting 14 years in the band (from 2010 - 2024), and they released an album in 2014 titled: Mislim Pozitivno! ("I think Positive!").

In 2017, Magazin together with Andrea, released the song "Žena, a ne broj" (Woman, not a number), which gained massive popularity in Croatia, gaining 17 million views as of 2025. The song lyrically discusses an unhappy love relationship. A music video directed by Leo Bartulica portrayed her as a bride, dressed all in white was located in a natural settings outdoor. It also features scenes of Andrea singing the song in the halls of the music school Josip Hatze. Speaking of its conception, Andrea revealed how the title was a reflection of what all women want, which was "complete attention and respect in the relationship". The song was also performed at the CMC Festival. Andrea left Magazin in 2024, to continue her solo career.

=== New Magazin with Lorena Bućan (2024 - present) ===
Andrea left Magazin in November 2024 and in one of Zagreb's night clubs Magazin announced their new 22 year old singer from Split Lorena Bućan, and the new Magazin released a single "Nevjestica" on November 8, 2024.

On 30 April 2025, Magazin released the single "Voljela sam" written by the Huljić duo, arranged by Tonči and Hrvoje Domazet. Tomislav Mrduljaš finished the mix and mastering. The music video for the song was filmed at the Split Square with the ship Golden Horizon. The video was directed by the team from the Pilot studio.

On 19 November 2025, Magazin released the pop ballad "Kao žena ženi", written by the Huljić duo, arranged by Tonči and Leo Škaro and the mix and mastering finished by Tomislav Mrduljaš. A video was directed by Vojan Koceić and PILOT studio and shows Bućan performing the song with the band and having a conversation with an older female.

On 15 February Magazin appeared together with Tonči Huljić at the 2026 Dora competition and performed a mash-up of 8 Magazin songs: "Nostalgija" together with Lidija Horvat - Dunjko, "Na svijetu sve", "Nesvjest", "Croatian Rhapsody", "AaAaA", "Voljela sam" and "Opijum". A writer of Dnevnik praised the group's performance full of emotion and called it an event worth to be remembered.

On 15 April 2026, the group released the single "Jabuka" written by the Huljić duo along with a music video. In it, lead singer Lorena acted as Eve along with another actor who actor who acted like Adam as the two were tempted to take an apple from an apple tree. Speaking in an interview related to the song's release, lead singer said: "The contrast between the melody and the dramatic lyrics, inspipred by war, nuclear threats and general fear in the world, creates an atmosphere that leaves the listener in suspension while the verses about the end of times intertwine with eternal yearning." The song peaked at number 11 on the HR Top 40 singles chart for the week of 4 May 2026.

=== Legacy ===
Magazin became one of the most popular and most influential music bands in Croatia and Yugoslavia. Their biggest hits are "Put putujem" (The path I’m travelling), "Ti si želja mog života" (You are the desire of my life), "Oko moje sanjivo" (My sleepy eye), "Sve bi seke ljubile mornare" (All girls would kiss the sailors), "Balkanska ulica" (Balkan street), "Istanbul", "Zna srce, zna" (The heart knows, knows), "Boli me" (It hurts), "Besane noći"(Sleepless nights), and many more. Most of these songs are considered as classics in Croatia. The band won the first iteration of Dora in 1992 with the song "Aleluja" but Croatia was not yet eligible to compete in the Eurovision Song Contest. Later, they entered the Eurovision Song Contest 1995 with "Nostalgija".

Songs of Magazin are popular in region of former SFRJ most prominently in countries of Serbia, Bosnia and Herzegovina and North Macedonia. Serbian folk singer Ceca sang "Put putujem" (The path I'm travelling) on 2007 New Years Show on Pink TV channel in Serbia. In December 2018, Dragica Zlatic posted a cover of Magazin song "Dani su bez broja" (Days are without a number) originally sang by Jelena Rozga and Esma Redžepova and as of 2024 has 14 million views on her YouTube channel.

== Members ==
=== Current members ===
- Željko Baričić – guitar (1979–present)
- Nenad Vesanović Keko – bass guitar (1979–present)
- Lorena Bućan – lead vocals (2024–present)

=== Former members ===
- Igor Biočić – bass guitar (1979)
- Zoran Marinković – drums (1979–1984)
- Miro Crnko – keyboards (1979–1992)
- Tonči Huljić – keyboards (1979–2006)
- Ante Miletić – drums (1984–2013)
- Ivan Huljić – keyboards (2006–2014)

=== Former vocals ===
- Majda Šoletić – lead vocals (1979–1982)
- Marija Kuzmić – lead vocals (1982–1983)
- Ljiljana Nikolovska – lead vocals (1983–1990)
- Danijela Martinović – lead vocals (1991–1996)
- Jelena Rozga – lead vocals (1996–2006)
- Ivana Kovač – lead vocals (2006–2010)
- Andrea Šušnjara – lead vocals (2010–2024)

== Discography ==
=== Studio albums ===
Title	Album details	Main vocalist	Sales
Slatko stanje	Released: 1982; Label: Jugoton; Formats: LP, cassette	Marija Kuzmić	
Kokolo	Released: 1983; Label: Jugoton; Formats: LP, cassette	Ljiljana Nikolovska	100,000
O, la, la	Released: 1984; Label: Jugoton; Formats: LP, cassette	Ljiljana Nikolovska	
Piši mi	Released: 1985; Label: Jugoton; Formats: LP, cassette	Ljiljana Nikolovska	200,000
Put putujem	Released: 1986; Label: Jugoton; Formats: LP, cassette	Ljiljana Nikolovska	670,000
Magazin	Released: 1987; Label: Lucky Sound; Formats: LP, cassette	Ljiljana Nikolovska	500,000
Besane noći	Released: 1988; Label: Jugoton; Formats: LP, cassette	Ljiljana Nikolovska	200,000
Dobro jutro	Released: 1989; Label: Jugoton; Formats: LP, cassette	Ljiljana Nikolovska	200,000
Najbolje godine	Released: 1990; Label: Jugoton; Formats: CD, Compilation album	Ljiljana Nikolovska	
Da mi te zaljubit u mene	Released: 1991; Label: Komuna Records; Formats: CD, cassette	Danijela Martinović	
Došlo vrijeme	Released: 1993; Label: Euroton Records; Formats: CD, cassette	Danijela Martinović	
Simpatija	Released: 1994; Label: Croatia Records; Formats: CD, cassette	Danijela Martinović	
Nebo boje moje ljubavi	Released: 1996; Label: Croatia Records; Formats: CD, cassette	Jelena Rozga	15,000
Da si ti ja	Released: 1998; Label: Croatia Records; Formats: CD, cassette	Jelena Rozga	40,000
Minus i plus	Released: 2000; Label: Croatia Records; Formats: CD, cassette	Jelena Rozga	
S druge strane Mjeseca	Released: 2002; Label: Croatia Records; Formats: CD, cassette	Jelena Rozga	15,000
Paaa..?	Released: 2004; Label: Croatia Records; Formats: CD, cassette	Jelena Rozga	
Dama i car	Released: 2007; Label: Croatia Records; Formats: CD, cassette	Ivana Kovač	80,000
Bossa n' Magazin	Released: 2008; Label: Croatia Records; Formats: CD, cassette	Ivana Kovač	110,000
Mislim Pozitivno!	Released: 2014; Label: Croatia Records; Formats: CD, digital	Andrea Šušnjara	

Achievements
Preceded by Tony Cetinski with "Nek' ti bude ljubav sva"	Croatia in the Eurovision Song Contest; 1995 (with Lidija Horvat-Dunjko)	Succeeded by Maja Blagdan with "Sveta ljubav"
