= Gordon Pogoda =

American songwriter

- Gordon Pogoda

Background information
- Born: Gordon Scott Pogoda
- Genres: Pop; dance; rock; country
- Occupations: Songwriter; producer
- Instrument: Piano
- Website: www.gordonpogoda.com

Gordon Pogoda is an American composer, lyricist, and producer based in Los Angeles. In 2018, he signed a publishing deal with BMG Music. Previously, he had publishing deals with EMI Music, Universal Music and Warner Chappell Music.

== Biography ==
Pogoda earned a B.S. in chemical engineering from the University of Massachusetts-Amherst. After working for a few years at an engineering firm, he decided to leave his engineering career behind and pursue his lifelong dream of songwriting, which he began at age 15 (he began playing piano at age 13.)

Pogoda has had songs featured in several media. In film, he had two songs featured in the Academy Award-winning picture Little Miss Sunshine, one in the film Josie and the Pussycats, one in the Disney film Get a Clue and several others. In television, Pogoda's songs have been featured in Hannah Montana with "If Cupid Had a Heart", and Sex and the City, CSI: Miami, ER, Will and Grace, King of the Hill, Samantha Who and Medium. Due to all his success in television and film, three albums of all Gordon Pogoda songs were released digitally. One is titled "Gordon Pogoda Songs From Film & TV", a 13-song various-artist set including "If Cupid Had a Heart" (featured in 17 TV shows and films such as Hannah Montana and Little Miss Sunshine). The second album is titled "If Cupid Had a Heart" and features all songs performed by guest vocalist Julie Griffin. And his latest album is called "The Indie Pop Collection".

Pogoda most recently had a #1 song on the UK iTunes Vocal Songs chart - "Dancing in the Driver's Seat" by Sonia, and also a song on a #8 album in the UK - the song "Beautiful Battlefield" by Steps on their album Tears on the Dancefloor: Crying at the Disco. His remix of "Beautiful Battlefield" (subtitled "Gordon Pogoda Dance Remix") is featured on Steps' 4-CD boxed set "Singles Collection", out July 27, 2018, as the closing song. He also wrote two songs recorded by European Pop Idol winner Patrick Jurdić, and had the number two song of the year in Russia for pop/rock artist Sergey Lazarev, and a top 5 hit for Tereza Kerndlová in the Czech Republic, which was selected to represent the Czech Republic in the 2008 Eurovision Song Contest. A song "I Wish I Could Pretend" written in collaboration with the Latvian composer Lauris Reiniks came in second place to represent Ireland in the 2009 Eurovision Song Contest. He had a platinum record with the Australian group Scandal'us, three platinum and gold records with the Greek group Hi-5, and a platinum record for Finnish girl band Tiktak. In the United States, Pogoda wrote a top 10 hit on the U.S. Contemporary Christian singles chart for sister group Aurora, and a single for Natalie Grant. Pogoda has also had songs used for Disney films, CDs, TV shows & DVDs.

=== Songs in notable films and television shows ===
Song	Film/Television Show
"If Cupid Had a Heart"	Little Miss Sunshine, an Academy Award-winning film
"If Cupid Had a Heart"	Hannah Montana, used three times in the episodes I Want You To Want Me ... To Go To Florida and We're So Sorry, Uncle Earl, performed by Selena Gomez as the character, Mikaila.
"If Cupid Had a Heart"	Longshot, a film featuring Britney Spears & Justin Timberlake
"Girl Attack"	Sex and the City
"I.C.U. (And My Heart Just Stops)"	CSI: Miami
"Lions and Tigers and Me"	Will and Grace
"Girl Attack"	ER
"I.C.U. (And My Heart Just Stops)"	Josie and the Pussycats, a top 10 film
"Lions and Tigers and Me"	Medium
"Tell It To the Rain"	Everwood
"If Cupid Had a Heart"	King of the Hill
"I.C.U. (And My Heart Just Stops)"	Kim Possible
"If Ever There Was"	The Suite Life of Zack & Cody
"Tell It to the Rain"	The Twilight Zone
"If Cupid Had a Heart"	Chris Isaak Show
"If Cupid Had a Heart"	The Facts of Life Reunion
"If Cupid Had a Heart"	Get a Clue, Disney Channel Original Movie starring Lindsay Lohan and Brenda Song

=== Songs on notable albums ===
Song	Artist
"Just Because You Walk Away"	Sergey Lazarev, the #2 song of the year in Russia, 2006
"Beautiful Battlefield"	Steps, featured on the #8 charting album in the UK, Tears on the Dancefloor: Crying at the Disco, 2017
"Dancing in the Driver's Seat"	Sonia, single which reached #1 on UK's iTunes Vocal Singles chart in July 2018.
"Beautiful Battlefield (Gordon Pogoda Dance Remix)"	Steps, featured on Steps' 4-CD boxed set, "The Singles Collection", August 2018
"Your Heart Or Mine"	Sonia, single which reached #2 on UK's iTunes Vocal Singles chart in August 2018.
"Have Some Fun"	Tereza Kerndlová, 2008 Eurovision Song Contest (top 5 hit)
"Don't Ever Love a Romeo/Ympyraa"	Tiktak, platinum-selling album, Universal Records
"I'm Not Gonna Cry (The Na Na Na Song)"	Scandal'us, Australian Popstars group, platinum-selling album
"Open Up the Door"	Hi-5, Greek Popstars group, platinum-selling album, Warner Brother Records
"Could It Be The Moon"	Hi-5, Greek Popstars group, platinum-selling album, Warner Brothers Records
"Get Real"	Patrick Jurdić, winner of Hrvatski Idol, Europe
"The Party"	Patrick Jurdić, winner of Hrvatski Idol, Europe
"Home For Christmas"	The Beu Sisters, featured on the CD Radio Disney Jingle Jams, (2005 version), Disney Records
"I Take the Road"	Greg Johnson, featured on Greatest Hits, EMI Records
"If the World Lost All Its Love"	Natalie Grant, Dove Award-winning Christian artist, Curb Records
"A World With You"	Aurora, a top 10 hit on the U.S. Contemporary Christian chart
"Just Because You Walk Away"	Mikael Kontinnen, Universal Records
"Going Going Gone"	Gioia Bruno, lead singer of Exposé, Koch Records
"Love Me 'Til Tomorrow"	Julie Budd
