= Lidija Bačić =

Croatian pop singer (born 1985)

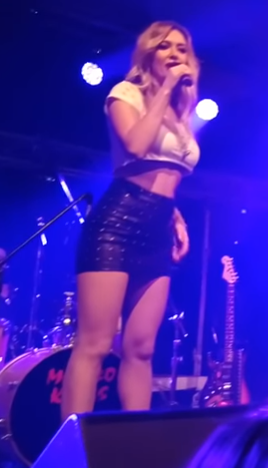
- Bačić performing in 2017

Background information
- Also known as: Lille
- Born: 4 August 1985 (age 41); Split, SR Croatia, SFR Yugoslavia
- Origin: Korčula, Croatia
- Genres: Pop
- Occupations: Singer; Actress; Model
- Years active: 2000–present
- Labels: Music Star Records; Scardona; Croatia Records; MenArt
- Website: planetlille.net

Lidija Bačić (born 4 August 1985), also known as Lille, is a Croatian pop singer. She rose to fame in 2005 after finishing as runner-up on the second season of Hrvatski Idol. Later in 2010, she released her debut album, Majčina ljubav.

Bačić has collaborated with several musical artists, including Mladen Grdović, Alen Vitasović, Grupa Vigor, Dražen Zečić and Tomislav Bralić.

== Early life ==
Lidija was born in Split on 4 August 1985. She has two sisters and a brother. She was raised in and remains deeply committed to the Roman Catholic faith. She consistently sang in church choirs from the age of ten and throughout her high school years. She recalled in 2026 that she was "constantly in church" during her childhood, attending twice a week as well as for rehearsals.

Bačić began performing at local festivals and competitions from the age of ten. She won her first prize at Dječji Festival in 1997 for her cover version of Mišo Limić's song "Zaljubljeni dječak". In 2005, she also achieved recognition at the 2005 Croatian religious Easter festival, Uskrsfest, performing songs including "Made for Heaven" and "Sign of Victory".

== Career ==
In early 2000, Bačić joined the group Perle. The group played at various festivals with Bačić being the main vocalist. In 2001, they tried to represent Croatia at the Eurovision Song Contest with the song "Pokraj bistra izvora" placing 15th in a field of 20 competing entries.

Bačić auditioned for the second season of Hrvatski Idol in Split, Croatia.

In January 2019, Bačić was announced as one of the 16 participants in Dora 2019, the national contest in Croatia to select the country's Eurovision Song Contest entry, where she, and the song "Tek je počelo", finished in 11th place.

== Personal life ==
Bačić is a devout Roman Catholic and has noted that "every Sunday Mass is obligatory for me". In 2018, she posted an image with the words "My Heart Belongs to Jesus" to her Instagram account, attracting both negative and positive comments from fans.

Bačić has responded to criticisms about her provocative performance style and often risqué attire, emphasizing her religious convictions and how these inform her approach to entertainment. "Faith still means a lot to me," she observed in a 2015 interview, "So, I didn't sell myself to the devil, as some people think. Faith is in my heart and in the first place."

While she admits that there is some conflict between her sensual aesthetic and choreography, she defended her standards as a professional necessity: "I can't be buttoned up to my throat at a concert."

Responding to backlash regarding the popular music video for her 2014 hit single "Kaktus", whose dance routine involved deliberate "wiggling of the buttocks", Bačić noted:

"Even my mom was thrilled when she saw the ["Kaktus" music] video and heard the song. There was nothing vulgar or provocative about it. Everything within limits is fine. It was a little sexy, but cute. There were, of course, negative comments, but when we look at both the domestic and world scene, I can say, unlike most of my colleagues, that I didn't even take off my clothes. And I would never take off my clothes. I'm not that person. I want to reach the audience with a song, not with nudity, because I'm a singer. If you don't have a song, your nudity is in vain."

She has also defended herself against the accusation that the lyrics to her songs often "flirt with sex appeal", saying that the music is "cool" and younger audiences rarely pick up on suggestive lyrics.

In 2026, she told Show Buzz her Christian faith still has an important place in her life. She continues to emphasize important religious festivals and regularly attends confesses her sins to a Catholic priest.

== Discography ==
=== Studio albums ===
- Majčina ljubav (2010)
- Daj da noćas poludimo (2011)
- Viski (2015)
- Tijelo kao pjesma (2017)
- Revolucija (2020)
- Flashback (2022)

=== Singles ===
Title	Year	Peak chart positions	Album
Title	Year	CRO	Album
"Krivi čovjek"	2014	37	Viski
"Još te čekam" (with Kumovi)	2014	19	Tijelo kao pjesma
"Kaktus"	2014	15	Tijelo kao pjesma
"Glupačo moja"	2017	39	Tijelo kao pjesma
"Solo" (with Luka Basi)	2017	19	Tijelo kao pjesma
"Vino rumeno" (with Vigor)	2018	2	Revolucija
"Tek je počelo"	2019	7	Revolucija
"Muške suze"	2019	—	Revolucija
"Romeo i Julija" (with Joy)	2019	17	Non-album singles
"Zalazimo k'o sunce"	2021	38	Non-album singles
"Stop" (with Žanamari)	2021	25	Flashback
"Najdraže moje"	2022	32	Non-album singles
"Nemam više ni snage, ni volje" (with Dražen Zečić)	2024	7	Non-album singles
"ABC"	2025	34	Non-album singles
"—" denotes releases that did not chart or were not released in that territory.

== Filmography ==
- Aleksi (movie), as Lille (2017)
- Ko te šiša (TV), as Lille (2018)
- Na granici (TV), as Lille (2018)
- Blago Nama (TV), as Lidija (2022)
