= Lorena Bućan =

Croatian singer

Lorena
- Born: 2002 (age 23–24); Split, Croatia
- Genre: Pop
- Occupation: Singer
- Instrument: Vocals
- Years active: 2017–present
- Label: Tonika Records
- Member of: Magazin

Lorena Bućan (born 9 March 2002) is a Croatian singer and the lead vocalist of Magazin. Bućan rose to fame in 2018 after finishing third on the second season of Zvijezde. She has signed a contract with record label Tonika Records where she primarily collaborates with musician Tonči Huljić and songwriter Vjekoslava Huljić.

As of 2024, she has released nine singles with the label, including "Tower of Babylon", "Kad si ti u pitanju", "Tihi ocean", "Drowning", "Kako samo mater zna", "Tvoja i gotovo", "Boli", "Jel' moguće" and "Ženska snaga". In November 2024, she replaced Andrea Šušnjara as the lead vocalist of Magazin. The group has since released four singles with Bućan as the lead vocalist, including "Nesvjestica", "AaAaA.", "Voljela sam" and "Kao žena ženi".

== Early life ==
Lorena was born in Split, Croatia in 2002. She grew up in a small town and started singing when she was just 8 years old. Lorena has an older brother and two sisters. Her singing talent was discovered by her mother's friend, singer Antonija Dora Pleško.

== Music career ==
=== 2019–2024: Early solo career ===
On 17 January 2019, Bućan was announced as one of the 16 participants in Dora 2019, the national contest in Croatia to select the country's Eurovision Song Contest 2019 entry, with the song "Tower of Babylon". She performed 14th and finished second with a total of 18 points. A few months later, in July 2019, Bućan performed her song "Kad si ti u pitanju" at the 59th Split Festival. On 21 November 2019, Bućan was revealed as one of the performers on the 67th Zagreb Festival. She performed the song "Tihi ocean", written by the mother-son duo Ivan and Vjekoslava Huljić. On 23 December 2019, Bućan was announced as one of the 16 participants in Dora 2020, the national contest in Croatia to select the country's Eurovision Song Contest 2020 entry, with the song "Drowning".

On 10 August 2020, Lorena released another single titled "Kako samo mater zna" (English: The Way Only a Mother Knows) written by the husband-wife duo Tonči and Vjekoslava Huljić. The music video for the song was directed by Vojan Koceić of Pilot Studio and depicts the singer, dressed in red, walking next to the beach scenery in Split. She promoted the song by a performance at the 60th Split Festival where she received three awards, including Golden Wave, first award from the jury and the journal award for best interpretation. Her performance at the show was seen as its highlight for its strong and convincing interpretation.

In 2020, Lorena released a single titled "Tvoja i gotovo" (English: Yours and That's It) written and produced by Vjekoslava and Tonči Huljić which gained popularity with the public. As of 2022, it has more than 3 million views on YouTube and was given the Cesarica Award in the category for September hit. In 2022, she sang a short snippet of the song with Jelena Rozga which was very well received by fans on Instagram. On 22 November 2022, Lorena released her new song "Boli", an uptempo song, written and produced by Tonči and Vjekoslava Huljić. The single was promoted on Radio Dalmacija the same day along with a music video released on YouTube directed by Vojan Koceić. The song was well received by her fanbase and other listeners. On 30 August 2023, she released the song "Jel' moguće" (English: Is It Possible) as a single following its premiere at the Melodije Hrvatskog Jadrana 2023. The song was written by Tonči and Vjekoslava Huljić, while the arrangement was done by Tonči Huljić and Leo Škaro. A music video for the song was directed by Pilot Studio and filmed at Palmižana. The song was very commercially successful and spent several weeks at the top of YouTube trending.

On 13 November 2023, "Ženska snaga" (English: Woman's Strength) was released as a single written by Vjekoslava Huljić, and arranged by Hrvoje Domazet and Ivan Huljić. The song debuted at number 31 on HR Top 40 for the week ending 13 November 2023. The following week, the song moved to its new peak position of 10. It last appeared on the chart for the week ending 1 January 2024 at the position of 33, after having spent eight weeks on it.

=== 2024–present: Magazin lead vocalist ===
On 24 June 2024, Lorena released a new summer song, titled "Melem" with an exclusive performance at Melodije Jadrana 2024 and an accompanying black-and-white music video. The song marked a shift in her singing technique, which she herself described as "atypical" and "mystical" in its atmosphere. She was also surprised at how the lyrics were well-suited for herself and how she lived the song every time she sang it.

On 15 October 2024, she sang an acoustic mashup of "Igracka", "Ženska snaga" and "Dug" together with singer Antonia Dora. In November 2024, she became the new lead vocalist of famous Croatian band Magazin, replacing Andrea Šušnjara who was their vocalist for 14 years. On 8 November 2024, they released "Nesvjestica", their first single with Lorena as the lead vocalist. On 5 December 2024, Magazin was announced as one of contestants of the upcoming Dora 2025. They entered the contest with the song "AaAaA."

On 30 April 2025, Magazin released the single "Voljela sam" written by the Huljić duo, arranged by Tonči and Hrvoje Domazet. Tomislav Mrduljaš finished the mix and mastering. The music video for the song was filmed at the Split Square with the ship Golden Horizon. The video was directed by the team from the Pilot studio.

On 19 November 2025, Magazin released the pop ballad "Kao žena ženi", written by the Huljić duo, arranged by Tonči and Leo Škaro and the mix and mastering finished by Tomislav Mrduljaš. A video was directed by Vojan Koceić and PILOT studio and shows Bućan performing the song with the band and having a conversation with an older female.

== Artistry ==
Due to her high vocal register and versatile capabilities, critics compared Lorena to Doris Dragović. Despite seeing that as a compliment, she shared with the public that she would not like to be called a "successor" to some singers. Her mentor and main collaborator Tonči Huljić also complimented her for the use of emotions in her interpretations. She cited his piece of advice to "stay herself" as very valuable. Lorena has cited Jelena Rozga as her favorite Croatian singer and someone she has listened to since a young age.

== Private life ==
On 9 April 2025, Bućan revealed that she ended a four-year relationship with her boyfriend in good terms. On 15 March 2026, sve gave an interview to Story.hr where she revealed her hobbies included going to the gym and photography.

== Discography ==
=== Singles ===
Title	Year	Peak chart positions		Album
Title	Year	CRO	CRO Billb.	Album
"Tower of Babylon"	2019	25	*	Dora 2019
"Kad si ti u pitanju"	2019	—	*	Non-album singles
"Tihi ocean"	2020	36	*	Non-album singles
"Drowning"	2020	— (Note: "Drowning" did not enter the HR Top 40, but peaked at number 98 on the regional HR Top 100 (Središnja Hrvatska) chart.)	*	Dora 2020
"Jedno bez drugoga"	2020	10	*	Non-album singles
"Tvoja i gotovo"	2021	13	*	Non-album singles
"Boli me"	2022	25	―	Non-album singles
"Ženska snaga"	2023	10	―	Non-album singles
"Melem"	2024	—	―	Non-album singles
"Nesvjestica" (as part of Magazin)	2024	3	20	Non-album singles
"AaAaA" (as part of Magazin)	2025	6	—	Dora 2025
"Voljela sam" (as part of Magazin)	2025	9	—	Non-album single
"Kao žena ženi" (as part of Magazin)	2025	5	—	Non-album single
"Jabuka" (as part of Magazin)	2026	11	—	Non-album single
"E moj ti" (as part of Magazin)	2026	7	—	Non-album single
"Lagao si za 3 života" (as part of Magazin)	2026	8	—	Non-album single
"—" denotes a single that did not chart or was not released. "*" denotes a single released before the chart launched.
