= Idol (Croatian TV series) =

Croatia has had two adaptations of the singing competition Pop Idol under two different titles and on two different networks:

- Hrvatski Idol, which was aired from 2004–2005 on Nova TV
- Hrvatska traži zvijezdu, which premiered February 22, 2009 on RTL
