= Nikol Bulat =

Croatian singer

- Also known as: Nicole Bulat
- Born: 16 October 1987 (age 38); Šibenik, SR Croatia, SFR Yugoslavia
- Genres: Pop; Turbo-folk
- Occupation: Singer
- Years active: 2006–2012
- Formerly of: Feminnem

Nikol Bulat (born 16 October 1987) is a Croatian former singer.

== Biography ==
Nikol Bulat was born in Šibenik, SR Croatia, Yugoslavia on 16 October 1987. In 2006 she competed for the position of lead singer of Magazin, popular pop music band from Split, after Jelena Rozga had left it. She performed their song "Opijum" (Opium) but she lost to Ivana Kovač.

In 2008 she became a member of Feminnem. With Feminnem, she recorded songs "Chanel 5" (Chanel No. 5), "Poljupci u boji" (Kisses in Colour) and "Oye, Oye, Oye", the latter featuring Spanish singer Alex Manga. Despite much success, she didn't fit in the group and subsequently left it.

In 2009, she released her debut solo single "Grešnica" (Sinner). The year after, she performed a song "Samo mi" (Just Us) at Mediafest. At the beginning of 2011, she recorded a duet "Crveni karton" (Red Card) with Bosnian singer Ada Grahović and, in June, she announced the songs "Strašno ti stojim" (I Suit You Terrifically) and "Hajde opa" (Come On Hopa) as her new singles, produced by Costi Ioniţă.

== Personal life ==
Nikol holds master's degree in law. According to reports, she left the music business and is working as an attorney as of 2018. She is in a relationship with Bosnian football player Ivan Šunjić.

== Singles ==
Title	Year	Album
"Grešnica"	2009	Non-album singles
"Samo mi"	2010	Non-album singles
"Crveni karton" (with Ada Grahović)	2011	Original
"Strašno ti stojim"	2011	Non-album singles
"Hajde opa"	2012	Non-album singles
