= Poslijepodne jednog fazana =

- Directed by: Marijan Arhanić
- Written by: Marijan Arhanić; Davorin Stipetić
- Starring: Rade Šerbedžija; Igor Galo; Mile Rupčić; Mišo Kovač; Jasna Mihaljinec
- Cinematography: Frano Vodopivec
- Edited by: Radojka Tanhofer
- Music by: Alfi Kabiljo
- Production company: Jadran Film
- Release date: 1972
- Running time: 89 min
- Country: SFR Yugoslavia
- Language: Croatian

Poslijepodne jednog fazana (The Afternoon of a Pheasant) is a Croatian film directed by Marijan Arhanić, starring Rade Šerbedžija, Igor Galo, Mišo Kovač and Mile Rupčić. It was released in 1972. The film received two awards at the 19th Pula Film Festival: Jury's Diploma for direction and Studio magazine's Golden Wreath for Arhanić's direction debut. The film was selected for preservation by the Croatian State Archives. The film is notable as the only acting role of Croatian pop folk singer Mate Mišo Kovač. The title is an allusion to Stéphane Mallarmé's poem The Afternoon of a Faun.

== Plot ==
A young man (Stipe Belobrk) and a girl (Jasna Mihaljinec) who recently met go for a stroll along a river bank. They are followed by a young mentally disabled angler named Milivoj (Igor Galo), hoping to indulge his voyeuristic urges, as well as three young pop band members who happened to be nearby, headed by a rowdy musician (Rade Šerbedžija).
