= Easter Festival =

Easter Festival may refer to:

- Aix-en-Provence Easter Festival, held in the Grand Théâtre de Provence, Aix-en-Provence, France
- Bayreuther Osterfestival, Germany
- Bendigo Easter Festival, Australia
- Easter Festival, part of the Lucerne Festival, Switzerland
- Osterfestspiele, part of a series of festivals in Baden-Baden, Germany
- Rand Show, which extended to a Joburg Easter Festival, South Africa
- Salzburg Easter Festival, Austria

== See also ==
- Russian Easter Festival Overture
- Easter (disambiguation)
- Easter parade (disambiguation)
- Easter traditions
- Lists of festivals § Seasonal
