= Tiktak =

Finnish rock group

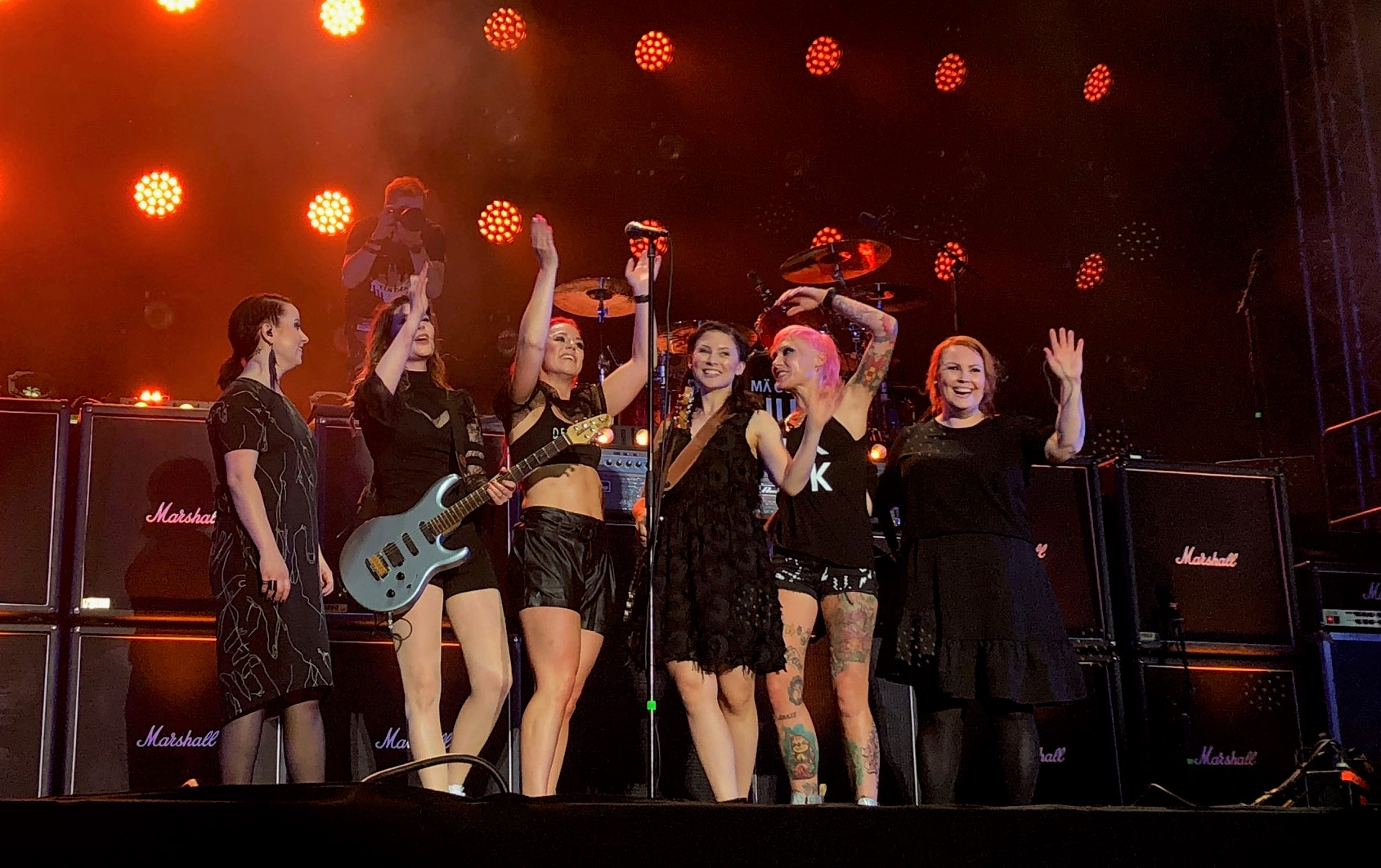
- Tiktak in 2018

Background information
- Also known as: Tik N' Tak
- Origin: Helsinki, Finland
- Genres: Pop, rock, pop punk
- Years active: 1999–2007, 2018
- Label: Universal Music
- Past members: Petra Gargano; Mirjami "Mimmu" Hyvönen; Nea Mokkila; Noora Puhakka; Emilia "Emppu" Suhonen; Tuuli Taimi

Tiktak, also known as Tik N' Tak, was a Finnish music group consisting of six musicians from northern Helsinki. The band was formed in Pohjois-Helsingin Bändikoulu (Northern Helsinki Band School) and signed to Universal Music in 1999, when the youngest members were 13. Their debut album, Friends, included songs written by Maki Kolehmainen (of Aikakone) and was a huge hit in Finland, with unusually strong sales in the rest of Europe, especially Scandinavia. The band's music was a blend of rock and pop. Each of the girls played their own instrument except Petra, who was the lead singer.

The band gained great domestic popularity. Their first two albums each sold about 100,000 copies.

The band was also marketed in the United States, where it was called Tik N' Tak. In 2000, they were on the Radio Disney tour and in early 2001 they opened for Aaron Carter. Friends was released on MCA Records.

Guitarist and vocalist Emilia "Emppu" Suhonen is also the vocalist for Dame, whose first album, So Was It Worth Dying For, was released in June 2006.

Their fifth album Ympyrää features the title cut "Ympyrää", written by Los Angeles songwriter Gordon Pogoda.

The band decided to break up in 2007, with the last performance in December 2007.

In the summer of 2018, the band came back together and played on four festivals in Finland.

== Band members ==
- Petra Gargano (lead vocals)
- Mirjami "Mimmu" Hyvönen (bass, vocals)
- Nea Mokkila (keyboards)
- Noora Puhakka (guitar, vocals)
- Emilia "Emppu" Suhonen (guitar, vocals)
- Tuuli Taimi (drums, vocals)

== Discography ==
=== Albums ===
Language	Title	Translated title	Year
Finnish	Frendit	Friends	1999
English	Friends	—N/a	2000
Finnish	Jotain muuta	Something Else	2001
Finnish; English	Jotain muuta... ja jotain uutta!	Something Else... and Something New!	2002
Finnish	Ympyrää	In a Circle	2003
Finnish	Hei me soitetaan... oikeesti!	Hey, We Play... Really!	2004
Finnish	Myrskyn edellä	Before the Storm	2005
Finnish	Sinkut 99–07	Singles 99–07	2007

=== Singles ===
Language	Title	Translated title	Year
Finnish	"Sekoitat mun maailman"	"You Confuse My World"	1999
Finnish	"Lopeta"	"Stop"	1999
Finnish	"Sydän lyö"	"The Heart Beats"	2000
Finnish	"Minne vaan"	"To Anywhere"	2000
Finnish	"Leijailen"	"I Glide"	2000
English	"Christmas (Baby Please Come Home)"	—N/a	2000
English	"Don't Turn Back"	—N/a	2000
English	"Upside Down"	—N/a	2000
Finnish	"Häiritsen sinua"	"I Disturb You"	2001
Finnish	"Kyyneleet"	"Tears"	2001
Finnish	"Jotain muuta"	"Something Else"	2002
Finnish	"Satuprinsessa"	"Fairytale Princess"	2002
Finnish	"Jää"	"Ice"	2002
Finnish	"Lähdetään tänään"	"Let's Leave Today"	2003
Finnish	"Tänä yönä taivaaseen"	"Tonight to Heaven"	2003
Finnish	"Tuuleksi taivaanrantaan"	"As Wind to the Horizon"	2004
Finnish	"Heilutaan"	"Let's Swing"	2004
Finnish	"Rannaton"	"Boundless"	2004
Finnish	"Sankaritar"	"Heroine"	2005
Finnish	"Samantekevää"	"Indifferent"	2006
Finnish	"Paha sana"	"Bad Word"	2006
Finnish	"Kuka vaan"	"Anybody"	2006
Finnish	"Miten onni korjataan"	"How to Fix the Happiness"	2007
Finnish	"Mutta mä rakastan sua"	"But I Love You"	2007

== See also ==
- List of best-selling music artists in Finland
