= Patrick Jurdić =

Patrick Jurdić (also known as Patrick Jurdič & Patrick Jurdic) (born 14 December 1985 in Vienna, Austria) is an Austro-Croatian singer who rose to popularity after winning Hrvatski Idol 2, the Croatian version of Pop Idol, shown by Nova TV. Additionally, he also took part in Austria's casting show Starmania and reached the top-12. One of the songs from his album "Reci Da Si Za", called "The Party", written by Gordon Pogoda, Johnny Elkins, Cutfather & Joe, was released as a single and video.

Patrick was the second only Idol to previously appear on another Idol series' performance show, he reached the Top 40 of Česko hledá SuperStar singing Robbie Williams' song "Angels" (incidentally he sang this song again on the night of his Hrvatski Idol victory), he was also criticised for not being fluent in Czech and was told to read a list of terms such as Strč prst skrz krk. He only gained 5% (36,203) of the total votes that week.

== Hrvatski Idol Performances ==
- Semi Finals: "Bridge Over Troubled Water" by Simon & Garfunkel
- Top 8: "Wake Me Up Before You Go-Go" by Wham!
- Top 7: "Daj Ugasi Žeđ" by Giuliano
- Top 6: "Rock Me Amadeus" by Falco
- Top 5: "I Believe I Can Fly" by R. Kelly
- Top 4: "Would I Lie To You?" by Charles & Eddie
- Top 3: "Nema Razloga" by Jacques Houdek
- Top 3: "Amazing" by George Michael
- Grand Final: "Moj Broj"
- Grand Final: "Džuli" by Daniel Popović
- Grand Final: "Angels" by Robbie Williams

== Discography ==
Albums

- Reci Da Si Za (July 2006)

Singles

- "Pull Me Out From Inside" (July 2006)
- "Moj Broj"
- "Samo Reci Da"
