= Majda Šoletić =

Slovene singer

- Šoletić in 1968
- Born: SR Slovenia, SFR Yugoslavia
- Occupations: Singer; model
- Years active: 1970s
- Spouse: Zoran Marinković

Majda Jazbec Šoletić is a Croatian-Slovene singer and model. She is best known as the first singer of Croatian band Magazin which, at the time of her singing career (1979-1982), was known only as Mladi Batali. The group later changed its name to Dalmatinski Magazin and then only Magazin. She was married to drummer Zoran Marinković.

== Career ==
Majda Jazbec was signed into the group Mladi batali from Split after being persuaded by composer Teo Trumbić. At the time, the group consisted of Željko Baričić, Zoran Marinković, Miro Crnko and Igor Biočić. The same year, they signed an agreement with label Jugoton.

Šoletić is an ethnic Slovene. Šoletić started her career as a worker in the clothing chain Peko and appeared in its printed commercials. Within the company, she worked selling shoes. In 1970, Šoletić won the title Miss Slovenija. In 1971, she contended for Miss Europe in Tunisia.

In 1980, the band released the song "Esmeralda" which was later included on the album Sy Ploče - Hr 36. It was uploaded on the band's YouTube channel nonamebg on 30 June 2010.

After the 1980s, Šoletić decided to retire permanently from creating new music; she disappeared from the public eye and stopped giving interviews.

== Personal life ==
During her career in Magazin, Majda Šoletić married drummer Zoran Marinković.
