= Ivana Kovač =

Croatian singer

- Born: 1 September 1977 (age 49); Zagreb, SR Croatia, SFR Yugoslavia (modern Croatia)
- Occupation: Singer
- Years active: 2006–present
- Partner: Elvir Hasanhodžić
- Children: 1
- Parents: Mišo Kovač (father); Anita Baturina (mother)

Ivana Kovač (pronounced [ǐʋana kǒʋat͡ʃ]; born 1 September 1977) is a Croatian singer. She is the best known as the lead singer of Croatian band Magazin in the period between 2006 and 2007. In the same year, the group Magazin released the album Dama i car.

Kovač is the daughter of the late Croatian singer Mišo Kovač. Some of her greatest musical successes include "Ako si muško", "Ludilo" and "Bila boja".

== Private life ==
Kovač was born on 1 September 1977 in Zagreb to Croatian singer Mišo Kovač, from Šibenik, and Anita Baturina, from Split. Kovač had an older brother Eduard Edi Kovač who died tragically in 1992, which led to the divorce of their parents. After finishing primary school in Zagreb, she finished high school in cosmetics which she had excellent success in. As a hobby, she danced balet and practiced taekwondo.

She is married to Elvir Hasanhodžić with whom she has a daughter Elena. Kovač is a devout Christian Catholic. She goes to mass every day and has spoken how faith and belief has changed her life.
