= Baruni =

Croatian Pop Band

Baruni is a Croatian pop band originating from Zagreb. The group was formed in 1991. The name "Baruni" (Croatian for "Barons") was given to them by Tomislav Ivčić. The group was previously signed to Croatia Records, but is currently working with rival Hit Records. They release their albums through in Bosnia through the label Hayat Production. They have been participated in the Croatian Radio Festival seven times and in the Etnofest Neum festival twice.

== Band members ==
- Miroslav Rus – songwriter
- Danijel Banić – lead vocal
- Jadranko Jagarinec – bass guitar
- Dubravko Jagarinec – acoustic guitar
- Jelena Domazet – keyboard
- Zvonimir Domazet – electric guitar
- Miroslav Budanko – drums
- Tihomir Markulin – keyboard
- Mladen Palenkaš – drums

== Albums ==
- Putuju i oblaci (1996)
- Vrati se (1997)
- Ulica Ilica (1998)
- Cirkus (1999)
- Otkad s tobom ne spavam (2002)
- Ljubav nosi tvoje ime (2003)
- Svanut' će jutro puno ljubavi (2007)

=== Singles ===
- Neka pati koga smeta, Hrvatska je prvak svijeta (1998)

=== Compilations ===
- Veliki hitovi 1 (2000)
- Najbolje od najboljeg (2006)
- Zlatna kolekcija (2011)

== Sources ==
- "Baruni" (in Croatian). Croatia Records.
