= Easter parade (disambiguation) =

The Easter parade is an annual parade in New York and other cities.

Easter Parade may also refer to:

- Easter Parade (film), starring Fred Astaire and Judy Garland
- "Easter Parade" (song), written by Irving Berlin
- The Easter Parade, a novel by Richard Yates
- "Easter Parade" (short story), a Nero Wolfe mystery novella by Rex Stout
