= Feminnem =

European girl group

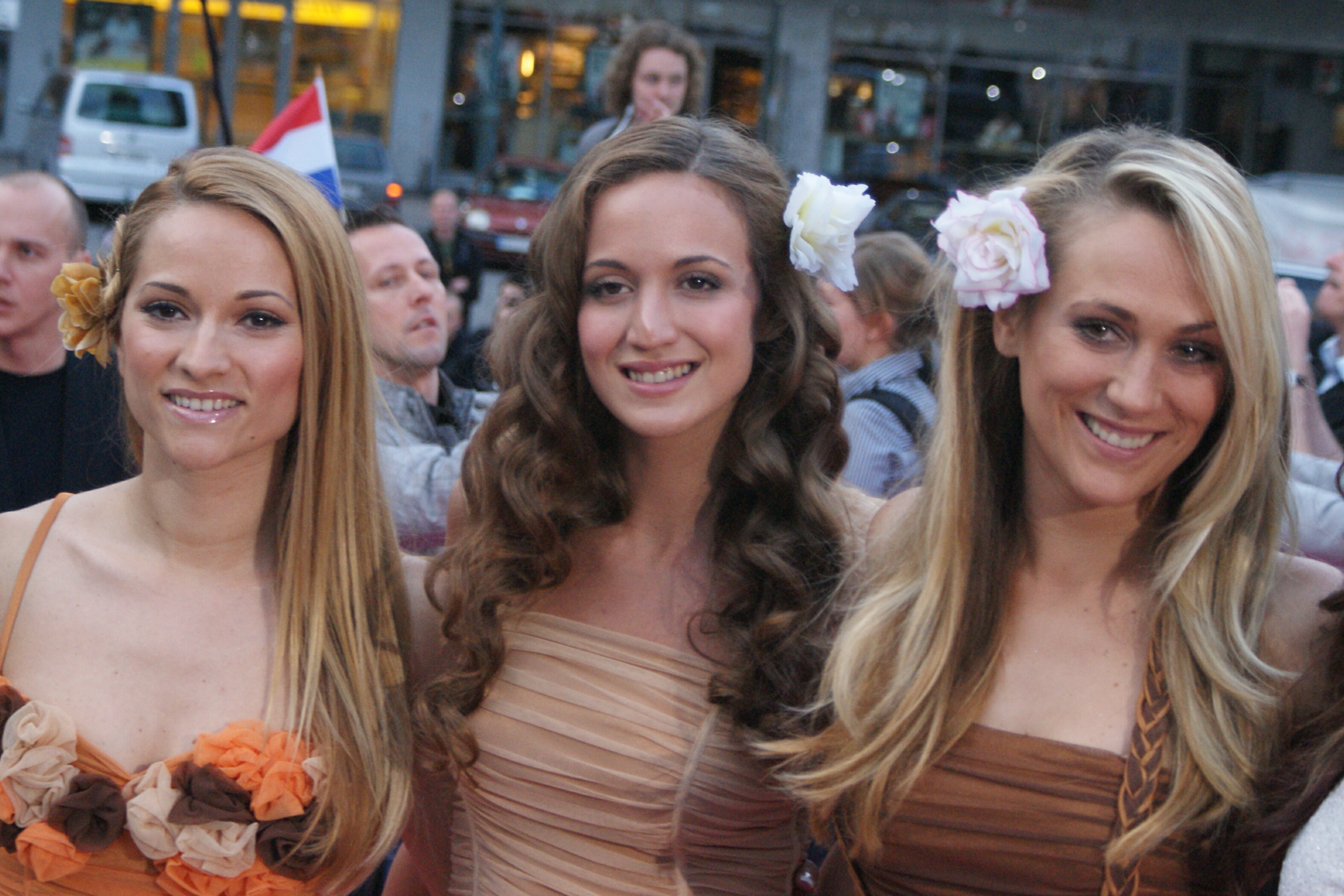
- Feminnem in Oslo (2010) (L-R): Pamela Ramljak, Nika Antolos, Neda Parmać

Background information
- Origin: Bosnia and Herzegovina/Croatia
- Genres: Pop, Dance
- Years active: 2004–2012; 2022–present
- Members: Neda Parmać; Pamela Ramljak; Nika Antolos
- Past members: Ivana Marić; Nikol Bulat
- Website: Feminnem.com

Feminnem is a girl group from Croatia and Bosnia and Herzegovina composed of three members. They represented both countries at the Eurovision Song Contest; Bosnia and Herzegovina in 2005 (with original members Ivana Marić, Neda Parmać and Pamela Ramljak) and Croatia in 2010 (when the group consisted of Nika Antolos, Parmać and Ramljak). On 21 February 2012, Pamela, Neda and Nika decided to start solo careers and leave Feminnem and effectively disbanded the group. They were named after American rapper Eminem. In May 2022, the group decided to get back together, and the members posted on social media the announcement for their comeback.

== Band members ==
=== Neda Parmać ===
Parmać was born April 28, 1985 (age 41) in Split, SR Croatia, SFR Yugoslavia and took dance lessons from an early age. At the age of thirteen, she performed as a member the band Kompas. In 2004, she entered the Hrvatski Idol competition (the Croatian version of Pop Idol). Her self-confident approach and ability to improvise appealed to the audience, as best seen in her rendition of Michael Jackson's Beat It, when she continued to perform despite forgetting the lyrics. She finished third, with the show being won by Žanamari Lalić. Together with two other finalists, she went on to create Feminnem.

=== Nika Antolos ===
Antolos was born August 10, 1989 (age 36) in Rijeka, SR Croatia, SFR Yugoslavia.

=== Pamela Ramljak ===
Ramljak was born December 24, 1979 (age 46) in Čapljina, SR Bosnia and Herzegovina, SFR Yugoslavia. She attended the Music Academy in Zagreb, and was back up vocal for Toni Cetinski and Amila Glamočak. In 2004, she was one of the finalists on Hrvatski Idol.

== Formation, disbanding and reunion ==
The group formed in 2004 following the appearance of the three original members on Hrvatski Idol. They debuted with the single "Volim te, mrzim te" ("I love you, I hate you"). In 2012, the group decided to split and effectively disbanded the group.

In May 2022, it was announced that Feminnem will reunite, and shortly after, their new single, "Zajedno" (Together) was released.

In March 2023, Feminnem placed first at the 70th jubilee edition of the annual Zagreb Festival with a song named "Trending" which they performed alongside Saša Antić.

== Eurovision Song Contest ==
2005

Feminnem won the right to represent Bosnia and Herzegovina in the Eurovision Song Contest 2005 in Ukraine with their entry "Call Me", an up-tempo pop song written and composed by Andrej Babić. They had automatic entry to the Eurosong Final, where they finished in fourteenth out of twenty-four participants.

2007

Feminnem hoped to represent Croatia in Eurovision Song Contest 2007 in Helsinki, Finland with the song "Navika", but they placed only ninth with 16 points. The winner was Dragonfly, featuring Dado Topić with "Vjerujem u ljubav".

2009

Feminnem again hoped to represent Croatia in Eurovision Song Contest 2009 in Moscow, Russia with the song "Poljupci u boji", but they placed third with 28 points. The winner was Igor Cukrov feat. Andrea Šušnjara with "Lijepa Tena".

2010

Feminnem took part at the Croatian national final for the third time in 2010, hoping to represent the country in the Eurovision Song Contest 2010 to be held in Bærum, Greater Oslo, Norway with their song "Lako je sve". Having finished only fourth in the semi-final, they nonetheless went on to win the final, receiving maximum points from both the jury and the telephone voters. They therefore succeeded in representing Croatia at Eurovision, however they failed to qualify for the final, placing thirteenth in a field of seventeen entries in semi-final two.

== Discography ==
- Feminnem Show (2005)
- Lako je sve (2010)
- Easy to See (2010)

== See also ==
- Bosnia and Herzegovina in the Eurovision Song Contest 2005
- Croatia in the Eurovision Song Contest 2010
- List of all-female bands

Preceded by Deen with "In The Disco"	Bosnia and Herzegovina in the Eurovision Song Contest; 2005	Succeeded by Hari Mata Hari with "Lejla"
Preceded by Igor Cukrov with Andrea with "Lijepa Tena"	Croatia in the Eurovision Song Contest; 2010	Succeeded by Daria Kinzer with "Celebrate"
