= Croatian Radio Festival =

Annual Croatian festival from 1997 to 2009

The Croatian Radio Festival (Croatian: Hrvatski Radijski Festival, abbreviated as HRF) was a music festival held annually in Croatia from 1997 to 2009. The festival was first held in 1997 in Vodice. It remained in Vodice until 2002, when it was held in Šibenik. After two years in Šibenik, Rijeka and Požega were co-hosts for the 2004 festival. In 2005 and 2006 it was held in Trogir, and in 2007 it was held in Hvar. In 2008 and 2009 it was held in Opatija. The festival was cancelled in 2010 due to financial problems and has been never organised since.

The festival gave out several awards, its highest being the Grand Prix. Other awards were the First Award of the Radio Listeners, the First Award of the Music Editors, the 24 sata Readers' Award (The 24sata is a daily newspaper), the Award Based on the Number of Received Calls by Telephone and, finally, the Award Based on the Number of Internet votes.

In 2009 there was one other award, the Toše Proeski Award, for the best vocal interpretation, won by Nina Badrić.

== Festival winners ==
- 1997 - Nina Badrić with "Budi tu"
- 1998 - Sandi Cenov with "Sunce moje to si ti"
- 1999 - Alen Nižetić with "Noćas se rastaju prijatelji"
- 2000 - Ivana Banfić feat. Dino Merlin with "Godinama"
- 2001 - Colonia with "Za tvoje snene oči"
- 2002 - Colonia with "Oduzimaš mi dah"
- 2003 - Colonia with "C'est la vie"
- 2004 - Ivana Banfić with "Otisak prsta"
- 2005 - Miroslav Škoro with "Svetinja"
- 2006 - Tony Cetinski with "Sve je s tobom napokon na mjestu" (in pop-rock category) and Marko Perković with "Tamo gdje su moji korijeni" (in "zabavna" category)
- 2007 - Toše Proeski with "Veži me za sebe" (in pop-rock category) and Dražen Zečić with "Stani srce" (in "zabavna" category)
- 2008 - Nina Badrić feat. Ljiljana Petrović Buttler with "Kralj života mog" (in pop-rock category), Antonija Šola with "Nebu pod oblak" (in pop song of the year category) and Baruni with "Svanut će jutro puno ljubavi" (in "zabavna" category)
- 2009 - Hari Mata Hari & Nina Badrić with "Ne mogu ti reći šta je tuga" (in pop-rock category), and Miroslav Škoro with "Domovina" (in "zabavna" category)
