= Mišo Kovač =

Croatian singer (1941–2026)

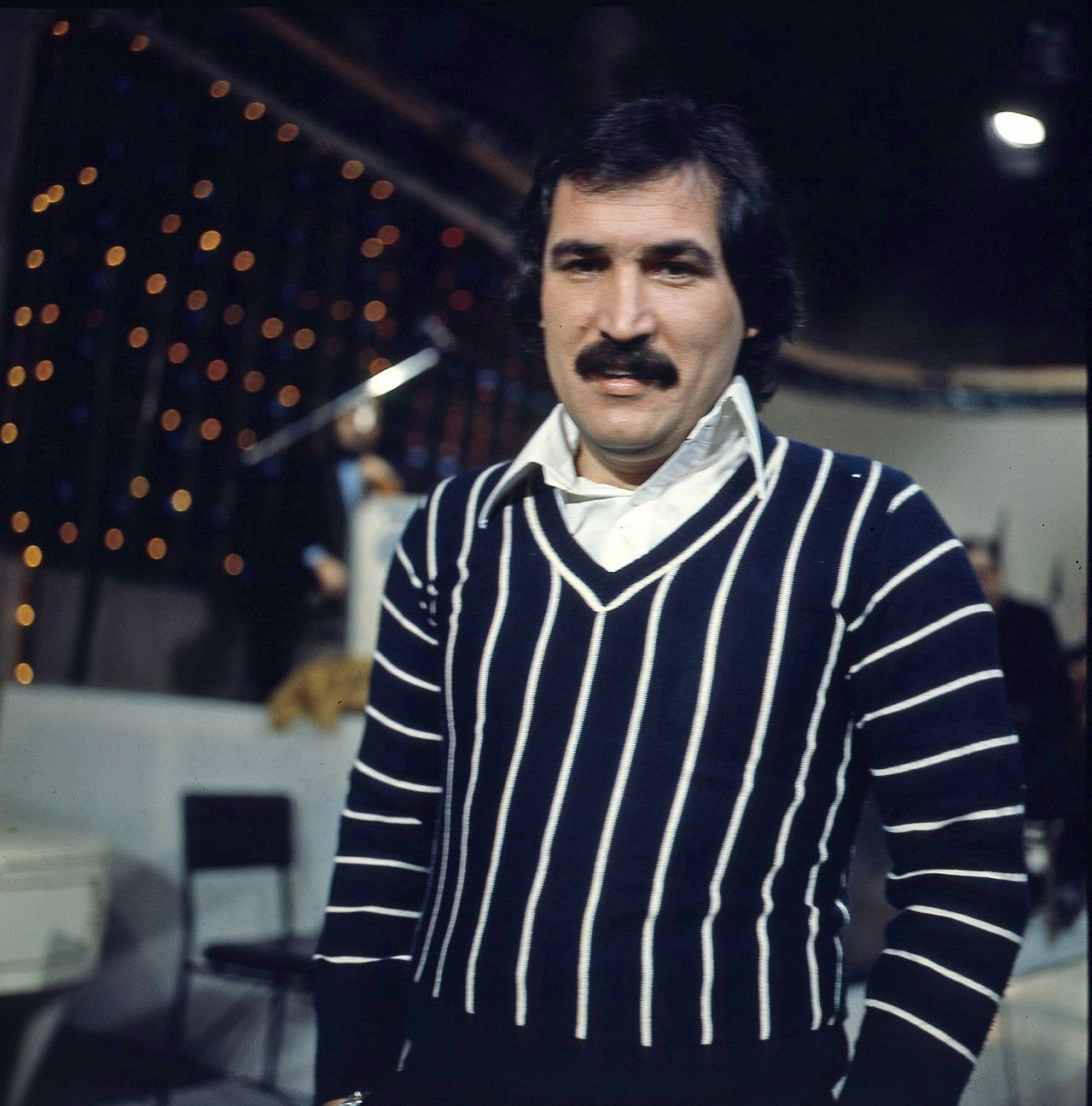
- Born: Mate Kovač; 16 July 1941; Sebenico, Governorate of Dalmatia, Kingdom of Italy (modern Šibenik, Croatia)
- Died: 31 October 2026 (aged 85); Podstrana, Croatia
- Occupation: Singer
- Years active: 1964–2026
- Spouses: Ljubica Komadina (divorced); Anita Baturina (m. 1973; div. 1996); Lidija Pintarić (m. 2002)
- Children: 2, including Ivana
- Musical career
- Genres: Country pop; pop-folk; schlager
- Instruments: Vocals; trumpet
- Labels: Jugoton; Croatia Records; Suzy; Maestral; Studio; CBS

Mate "Mišo" Kovač (pronounced [mǎːte mîʃo kôʋatʃ]; 16 July 1941 – 31 October 2026) was a Croatian recording artist. He was the best-selling artist from Croatia and former Yugoslavia, with well over 20 million records, cassettes and compact discs sold to date, and is often regarded as one of the most popular musical performers from Southeastern Europe.

== Early life ==
Kovač was born in Šibenik during the Italian occupation of Dalmatia in the Second World War as the second child of mother, Zrinka (b. Jurišić), and father, Jakov Kovač. His mother was originally from the island of Vrgada, and his father was from the Škopinac city district of Šibenik. Kovač grew up in a family with his brother, Ratko, and sister, Blanka. As a child, he lived in a street in Šibenik's Varoš along with fellow musicians, Vice Vukov and Arsen Dedić. As a young man, he practiced football as a goalkeeper and started playing for the junior team of HNK Šibenik, dreaming of a professional football career at Hajduk Split, which he was also a fan of, often traveling by boat from Šibenik to Split for matches. He was receiving defeats of his team very emotionally.

Hearing the performances of the Šibenik-based singer, Ljubo Lučev, 16-year-old Kovač is slowly giving up football and dedicating himself to music. He listened to popular Italian performers such as Luciano Tajoli, Tony Dallara, Adriano Celentano, and Johnnie Ray. He finished industrial high school, learning the trade of upholsterer. In 1961, at the "Prvi glas Šibenika" (First Voice of Šibenik) competition, he shared the title of the best with Mirko Vukšić, the future guitarist of the group Mi, and chose the single by Elvis Presley for the award. He served his military service in the Yugoslav People's Army (JNA) in Belgrade, where he sang on Saturday nights, entertaining conscripts and friends. After completing his military service, he arrived in Zagreb, where he sang to students and lived in the student center and cafes.

== Musical career ==
=== Beginnings ===
... the voice is a bit harsh, partly raw, it carries a specific charm and inner expansion ...

— P. Gotovac.

The dark voice, harsh, is reminiscent of Ray Charles.

— Jugoton, 1969.

At one talent competition in Karlovac, with the song "I Can't Stop Loving You" by Ray Charles, he experienced great success and was soon noticed by music producers. He had his first impromptu performance with the Alfons Vučer ensemble in Zagreb's city cafe in the autumn of 1964, and after the consent of editor-in-chief Pero Gotovac, he received a contract to record his first record with Jugoton, a translation of "I Can't Stop Loving You" by his idol Ray Charles. The record was a success and in the summer of 1965 Mišo performed at the Melodije Jadrana (Melodies of the Adriatic) in Split with three performances. Despite the disappointing performance, new records followed with silver circulations of fifty thousand copies – renditions of "Ja odlazim" (I'm Leaving), "Vrijeme plakanja" (Crying Time), "San Francisco" (original by Scott McKenzie), "Da je duži moj dan" (If My Day Was Longer), and others.

The hit with which he established himself as a renowned performer was the song "Više se nećeš vratiti" (You Won't Return Again), the winning song from the popular Sarajevo festival Vaš šlager sezone (Your Schlager of the Season) (1969), the work of the then young composer and lyricist Đorđe Novković. The single sold 183,987 copies, the second best-selling record by Jugoton that year. In 1969, he sold a total of five records in 252,905 copies, making him Jugoton's best-selling singer. The collaboration with Novković marked almost the entire Kovač's oeuvre and continued until Novković's sudden death in 2007. In 1971, he won the Split Festival with the song "Proplakat će zora" (The Dawn Will Start Weeping) by Stjepan Mihaljinec and Drago Britvić, which sold more than 300,000 copies, which definitely established him on the throne of the most popular singer in Yugoslavia. According to a list of top five best Croatian songs of all time compiled by RTL television show Croatian Number One published in 2021 and taking in account week at number one on charts, number of sales and air time, "Proplakat će zora" ranked at number two. In two days he won five awards, and in the middle of the Croatian Spring, he paid the proceeds from the sale of the plaque for the construction of the Zagreb-Split highway. In 1971, he almost died in a car accident near Zadar. His car was completely smashed, and as he left a scar above his upper lip, during his recovery, Mišo decided to grow his moustache, which would later become his trademark.

=== The peak of popularity ===
In 1972, he attended an Elvis Presley concert at New York's Madison Square Garden, and Elvis' performance of Frank Sinatra's "My Way" standard made a great impression on him. In 1974, he recorded an album of klapa and folk songs "Oj ti dušo duše moje" (Hey You, the Soul of My Soul) with Klapa Šibenik. The song "Drugi joj raspliće kosu, a ja je volim" (The Other Man Unravels Her Hair, and I Love Her) also became popular. In 1975, with the song "Ostala si uvijek ista" (You've Always Stayed the Same), after his recognition as the best in his career, he performed at the Jugoslovenski hit parade (Yugoslav Parade Hit) competition in Belgrade. Although he won overwhelmingly, the audience did not immediately accept it, and the song gained popularity only 10 years later, when it was released on the album of the same name sold 200,000 copies. In 1977, he won the Split Festival with "Noćas ćemo zemlji ko materi reći" (Tonight We Will Tell the Land Like a Mother) with the Klapa Maslina. After 1980 and winning the festival in Split with the song "Dobra ti večer, mati moja" (Good Evening to You, My Mother), he decided not to perform at festivals. In 1982, he returned to Dalmatian, local themes with the golden album Dalmacija u mom oku (Dalmatia in My Eye), arranged by Krste Juras and Dušan Šarac, from which the hits became the single of the same name and "Šibenske kale" (Šibenik's Streets). In 1983, he experienced a convincing failure with the song "Posadi cvijet" (Plant a Flower) in the national selection for the representative of Yugoslavia at the Eurovision Song Contest, which he attributed to the setting. He also collaborated with Idoli and Vlada Divljan on the recording of his 1968 song "Da je duži moj dan" for the soundtrack of the film Six Days of June in 1985. The most fruitful period followed: between 1985 and 1988 he recorded his greatest hits, such as "Ako me ostaviš" (If You Leave Me), "Jedan dan života" (One Day of Life), a cover of the Mexican song "Las mañanitas " that was popularized in Yugoslavia by Mexican movie "Un dia di vida"), "Sutra mi sude" (I'm Being Tried Tomorrow), "Ti si pjesma moje duše" (You're My Soul's Song, adaptation of the song "Seven Spanish Angels" by Willie Nelson and Ray Charles), "Svi pjevaju, ja ne čujem" (Everyone's Singing, I Can't Hear Them) and many others. His music career continued to flourish; he was named Singer of the Year five times, and was named Person of the Year in the former Yugoslavia in 1989.

=== Personal tragedies and withdrawal from the scene ===
In September 1991, he joined the Croatian Band Aid on the recording of the song "Moja domovina" (My Homeland), in which he sang the line "Ima oči boje mora" (She has sea-colored eyes). In 1992, his 16-year-old son Edi, a member of the Croatian Army's special unit Scorpions, died in Zagreb under suspicious circumstances. Mišo never completely got over that tragic event. He also released a single "Pjesma za Edija" (Song for Edi). After Edi's death and the big concert Noć svijeća (Night of Candles) in front of 50,000 people at Stadion Poljud in Split in 1993, Kovač publicly announced that he would not perform again and took his first name again; however, he held a whole series of farewell concerts and did not end his career. He also recorded other patriotic songs during the Yugoslav Wars, such as "Grobovi im nikad oprostiti neće" (Graves Will Never Forgive Them) and "To je zemlja gdje žive Hrvati (Herceg-Bosna)" (That's a Land Where Croats Live (Herzeg-Bosnia)). In 1996, he held a concert Svojoj vjernoj publici (To My Faithful Audience).

In addition to his son Edi, he lost his mother and younger brother Ratko in the 1990s, while his daughter Ivana struggled with addiction. After years of depression and alcoholism, on 14 January 1999, in a Zagreb apartment at Maksimirska 69, Kovač shot himself in the chest with an unregistered Beretta pistol, but he survived and fully recovered, and his mental state later improved considerably.

=== Back to the scene ===
After recovering from a suicide attempt, he held a big concert at Dom Sportova in Zagreb. However, that was not the end of Kovač's career. New albums followed; in 1999, Mišo recorded the album Budi čovjek dobre volje (Be a Man of Good Will), as he says, thanks to his daughter Ivana. The following year, he briefly returned to music festivals and immediately won the Split Festival with the song "Vraćam ti se Dalmacijo mati" (I'm Returning to You, Mother Dalmatia). In the same year he recorded the big hit "Dalmatino", a kind of anthem of Dalmatia. In September 2001, he held two concerts in New York for Croatian emigrants and donated half of the proceeds to the families of firefighters killed on 11 September. For the new studio album Mir u srce (Peace in the Heart), released in 2004, in 2006 he received a silver award, and for the compilations Pjevaj, legendo (Sing, Legend; 1999) and Najdraže pjesme Miše Kovača (Favorite Songs by Mišo Kovač; 2003) two platinum awards. From the album Mir u srce, the single "Rođo moj" (My Cousin) achieved the greatest success. In August 2004, with Klapa Teuta as guests, he held a concert on the Republic of Croatia Square between the Cathedral of St. James and the city hall in Šibenik. The concert was published on the DVD Mišo u Šibeniku (Mišo in Šibenik).

=== Late career ===
After a break, in 2006, he recorded the album Ja sam kovač svoje sreće (I Am the Blacksmith of My Happiness) on which his daughter Ivana joined him as a guest: the biggest success from that album is their duet "Nema mi do tebe nikoga" (I Have No One Else Like You). In 2007, for the 28th time in his career, Mišo performed in the full Arena Gripe in Split, while the following year he held concerts in front of a large audience in the Pula Arena and Krešimir Ćosić Hall in Zadar with more than 8,000 fans. In 2008, Croatia Records announced reissues of 13 of his most famous albums from the 1970s and 1980s with digitally remastered sound.

In 2009, Mišo Kovač, as the first Croatian singer, held a concert in the newly built Arena Zagreb in front of 20,000 fans of all generations, thus once again proving the status of a legend of the Croatian music scene. The following year, he released his, as he said, last album Ne tražim istinu (I'm Not Looking for the Truth), and announced the end of his career. The album Ne tražim istinu achieved moderate success, experiencing a golden circulation. Almost all the songs are covers of old songs, released on earlier albums and re-recorded in new arrangements. The third single from the album and the only new song, a duet with his daughter Ivana, the ballad "Tvoja mala" (Your Baby Girl), was a bit more successful on the charts, reaching the top of domestic pop music on some radio stations. However, despite the announcement of the end of his career, he continued with performances and concerts, and with the Klapa Rišpet of Ivo Amulić he recorded the song and video "Sunce mi od tebe dolazi" (My Sunlight is Coming from You), which in March 2012 took first place on the Radio Dalmatia top chart Hrvatski Top 33.

In March 2012, in recognition of the profession, Mišo received the Porin for lifetime achievement. Porin was also awarded to conductor, arranger, composer and pianist Stjepan Mihaljinec, who also wrote some of Mišo's greatest hits. Mišo performed some of his greatest hits with Mihaljinec on the piano at the award ceremony, to the applause of the audience and the musicians present, as well as other Porin winners. The five-time sound carrier 100 originalnih hitova – Mišo Kovač (100 Original Hits – Mišo Kovač) was also released, which achieved a diamond circulation, for which he was awarded in February 2014 at two sold-out concerts held at the Vatroslav Lisinski Concert Hall in Zagreb. At the same time, Ivana Kovač and Klapa Bunari released a song dedicated to Mišo — "Dalmacijo, srce oca moga" (Dalmatia, My Father's Heart) — which was well received by the audience.

== Appearances in film and television ==
Kovač also tried himself at acting, so in 1972 he starred with Rade Šerbedžija in the film One Pheasant in the Afternoon. He rarely performed on television, and he said he still avoided appearances on TV "because when you constantly sing on TV, you also come to the homes of people who don't like you. When I work, I do a concert and people who love me watch me, I don't bother people who don't love me." His guest appearance in the jubilee 400th episode of the talk show Nedjeljom u dva on Croatian Radiotelevision on 16 July 2006 is one of the most watched in the show's history.

He briefly stopped his practice in June 2012, performing in the humanitarian edition of the show Misija zajedno (Mission Together) on Croatian Radiotelevision, where he performed eight songs live in an hour and collected 200,000 HRK in aid for children.

== Political engagement ==
According to his own confession, he repeatedly refused to sing for Yugoslav president Josip Broz Tito, and in 1972 he donated the proceeds from the sale of the record "Proplakat će zora" and a concert with Boris Dvornik for the construction of the Zagreb-Split highway. Before performing for Croatian emigrants in Calgary in 1986, he asked for the bust of Croatian fascist dictator Ante Pavelić to be removed from the wall of the emigrant home.

Before the first multi-party elections in Croatia, in a large interview in Nedjeljna Dalmacija entitled Dalmacija u mom oku (Dalmatia In My Eye), he stated: "If these come to power, there is no place for me here anymore," referring to the Croatian Democratic Union (HDZ). Later, his desire to shed light on the circumstances of the death of his son Edi brought him into contact with the Croatian Party of Rights (HSP). He began to show public support for the party, appearing at party rallies in the black uniform of the Croatian Defence Forces (HOS). He later befriended Croatian president Franjo Tuđman, to whom he paid tribute even after his death. After 1991, he categorically rejected any possibility of performing in Serbia or Montenegro.

In 2002, he marked the 40th anniversary of his musical activities with a sold-out concert Centimetar moga puta (Centimetre of My Path) in the Arena Gripe in Split, from which he donated part of the proceeds again for the construction of the Zagreb-Split highway.

On 30 June 2007, he attended the eighth HDZ general assembly, and in 2009 he joined the local election campaign and openly supported the independent candidate Željko Kerum, who won the elections in Split and became the new mayor. In July of the same year, Mišo collaborated with many other entertainers on the song "Pjesmo naša" (Our Song) by Dražen Žanko, which was to become the new anthem of the HDZ. Mišo premiered his part on the occasion of the 20th anniversary of the HDZ. In April 2013, he testified at the trial of the former HDZ president and former Prime Minister Ivo Sanader, because the prosecution claimed that he had received illegal money from the party for his appearances in the HDZ election campaign, according to Sanader's idea. Mladen Barišić paid the fund in cash. On that occasion, he stated that he supported the HDZ "because of his son Edi, because he has been a member of the HDZ since 1990."

== Personal life and death ==
Kovač divorced his first wife Ljubica Komadina after four years of marriage, and in 1973 he married Anita Baturina, Miss Yugoslavia, from Split, with whom he had a son, Eduard "Edi", born in 1975, and daughter, Ivana, born two years later; both of them were born in Zagreb. His wife and their two children appeared with him in the music videos for the songs "Malo mi je jedan život s tobom" (One Life With You Isn't Enough for Me) and "Ako me ostaviš" (If You Leave Me).

After the death of his son, his marriage fell apart and he briefly tried to have a love affair with the 30-year-younger astrologer, Silvija Conte Calvi Marković. After recovering and returning to the stage, Kovač's new partner became Lidija Pintarić, whom he met in 1998 and married in 2002. Kovač has repeatedly emphasized his commitment and gratitude to Lidija and the importance of their relationship and marriage for his recovery and return to the stage.

Kovač died at his home in Podstrana on 31 October 2026, at the age of 85.

== In popular culture ==
Mišo Kovač is generally accepted as a charismatic and icon of Dalmatia, especially the football club Hajduk Split and the Torcida fan group, although at his concerts he often appeals to the "all-Croatian unity" of Dinamo Zagreb and Hajduk fans. In Hajduk's jersey number 9, he performed at Stadion Poljud before the derby between Hajduk and Dinamo in 2001, performing his songs related to Dalmatia. His songs about Dalmatia like "Noćas ćemo zemlji ko materi reći", but also love songs like "Samo nas nebo rastavit može" (Only the Heaven Can Do Us Apart), as well as paraphrases of his verses became part of Torcida's choreography and fan slogans. According to the covers of his albums, numerous graffiti were created in Dalmatia, and one of his most recognizable images, taken from a photograph by M. Čolić from Studio, with sunglasses, a sailor's T-shirt and a gold chain, was chosen for the cover of the five-way sound carrier, 100 originalnih hitova – Mišo Kovač, released in May 2012. This cover is also found on numerous T-shirts and souvenirs on the Adriatic coast. Ivana Kovač wore a T-shirt with the same character in the video for her song "Dalmacijo, srce oca moga". Another image closely related to Mišo Kovač is his recognizable pose during concerts, in which he lets the audience sing his songs with open arms.

Julije Jelaska also published a comic about Mišo Kovač, with the lyrics of the songs "Dalmacija u mom oku" (Dalmatia in my eye) and "Ostala si uvijek ista" (You remain always the same).

His song "Poljubi zemlju" (Kiss the Land) became the unofficial anthem of the Croatia men's national water polo team, which sang it after winning the 2012 Olympic tournament in London and during the reception ceremony in Zagreb, together with the audience. In 2016, the song was chosen to be played on the surface of Mars, which Kovač deemed his greatest musical achievement and the greatest achievement of Croatian music.

In the first edition of the questionnaire on knowledge of Croatian culture and social order, a condition for exercising Croatian citizenship, the question of what Mišo Kovač does was also noted.

"Proplakat će zora" (The dawn will cry) is featured prominently in the first season of The Walking Dead: Dead City, often played when Željko Ivanek’s character, “The Croat”, is in the scene. "Noćas ćemo zemlji k'o materi reći" (Tonight we will tell the land like our mother) is also featured in the third episode of the show's second season.

== Awards ==
Kovač won numerous gold, diamond and silver records, as well as discographic and festival awards. He was, of course, also the owner of the "Golden Bird" which Jugoton / Croatia Records distributed to performers for a million copies sold. In 2005, Croatian Music Institute handed him a special recognition "for the largest number of records sold in the history of Croatian discography".

== Discography ==
- Mišo Kovač (1971, reissue 2008)
- Portret (1973)
- Mi smo se voljeli (1974)
- Oj ti dušo duše moje (1974)
- Ovo je naša noć (1977, reissue 2008)
- Uvijek ima nešto dalje (1979, reissue 2008)
- Čovjek bez adrese (1980, reissue 2008)
- Jači od vjetra (1981, reissue 2008)
- Dalmacija u mom oku (1982, reissue 2008)
- Osjećam te (1983, reissue 2008)
- Zajedno smo (1984, reissue 2008)
- Potraži me u pjesmi (1984, reissue 2008)
- Ostala si uvijek ista (1985, reissue 2008)
- Ti si pjesma moje duše (1986, reissue 2008)
- Malo mi je jedan život s tobom (1987, reissue 2008)
- Samo nas nebo rastavit može (1989, reissue 2008)
- Suza nebeska (1989)
- Za kim zvono plače (1990)
- Pjesma za Edija (1993)
- Mate Mišo Kovač (1994)
- Istina o Blajburgu (1994)
- Mojoj vjernoj publici (1995)
- Al' je ljubav bolest teška (1996)
- Osjećam se jači (1998)
- Budi čovjek dobre volje (1999)
- Dalmatino (2001)
- Mir u srce (2004)
- Ja sam kovač svoje sreće (2006)
- Ne tražim istinu (2010)

== Literature ==
- Janjatović, Petar (2003). Ex YU rock enciklopedija. Belgrade: Čigoja štampa.
