= Feminnem Show =

Studio album by Feminnem
- Released: 2005
- Recorded: 2005
- Genre: Pop
- Length: 42:38
- Label: Croatia Records
- Producers: Miro Buljan, Motiwwwo, Ante Pecotic, Aleksandar Valencic, Branimir Mihaljevic

Feminnem chronology
Feminnem Show (2005)	Lako je sve (2010)

Feminnem Show is Feminnem's debut album released in 2005. They are best known for representing Bosnia and Herzegovina at the 2005 Eurovision Song Contest. The album includes their Eurovision song, "Zovi", as well as its English version, "Call Me".

== Track listing ==
1. "Volim te, mrzim te" – 2:46
2. "Vino na usnama" – 4:06
3. "Ne treba mi to" – 3:40
4. "Zovi" – 2:58
5. "2 srca 1 ljubav" – 3:24
6. "Klasika" – 2:59
7. "Kaznit' ću te ja" – 3:14
8. "Krivo je more" – 4:14
9. "Odvedi me" – 3:59
10. "Kajanje" – 4:02
11. "Reci nesto, al' ne suti vise" – 3:39
12. "Call Me" – 2:58
