= Andrea Šušnjara =

Croatian singer (born 1987)

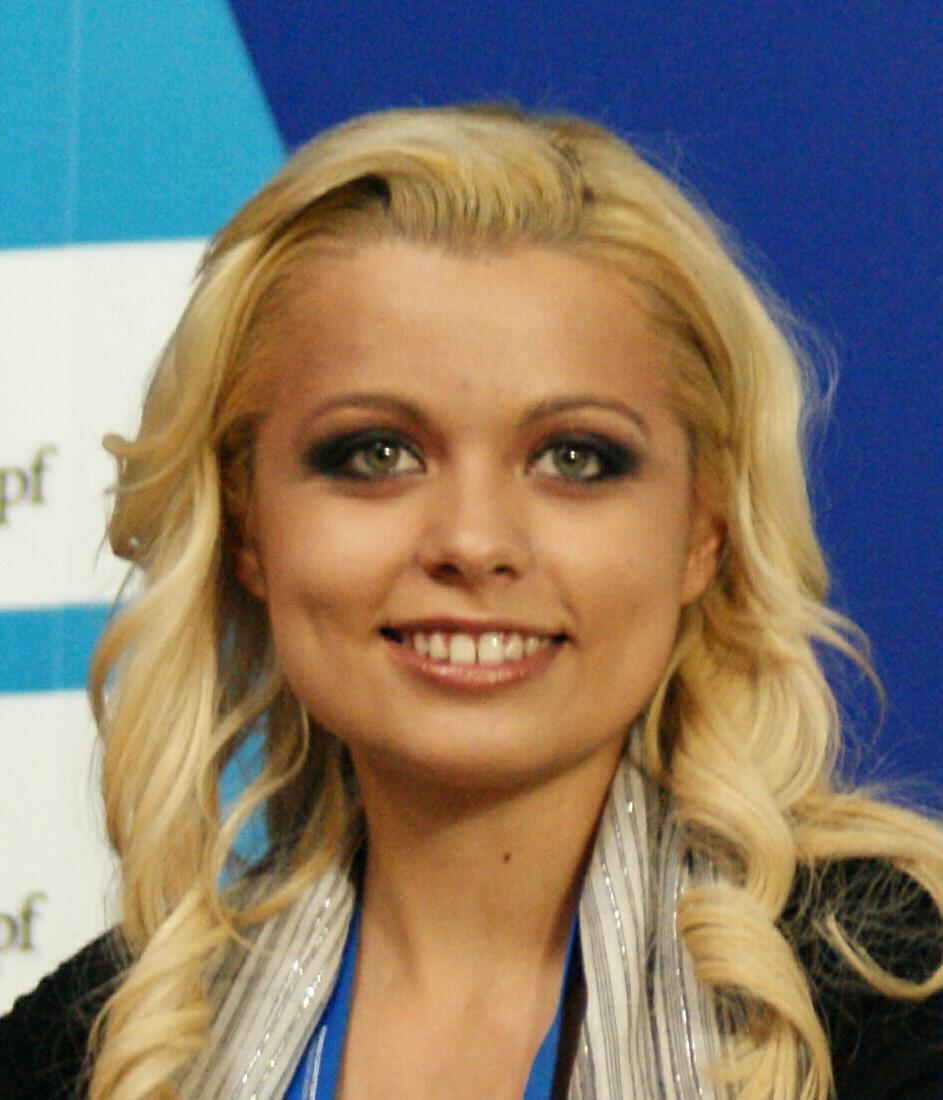
- Šušnjara in 2009

Background information
- Born: 26 February 1987 (age 39); Split, SR Croatia, SFR Yugoslavia
- Genres: Classical music; folk music; pop music
- Occupation: Singer
- Instrument: Vocals
- Years active: 2004-present
- Formerly of: Magazin

Andrea Šušnjara (born 26 February 1987) is a Croatian artist. She is best known as the lead singer of group Magazin in the period between 2010 and 2024. She released her first album with the group Mislim pozitivno! (I Think Positively) in 2014.

Šušnjara competed to represent Croatia at the Eurovision Song Contest 2004, performing the song "Noah" at Dora 2004. She won the semi-final and qualified to the final, where she finished second, losing out to Ivan Mikulić. She was also the Croatian entrant for the Eurovision Song Contest 2009 together with Igor Cukrov. The two were the winners of Dora 2009 with the song "Lijepa Tena" (Beautiful Tena).

Šušnjara launched a solo career in music with the release of singles "Ja bi još" (2024) and summer single "Normala" (2025). Šušnjara is a devout Catholic Christian and an animal empathy activist. She is an ovarian cancer survivor. Since 2023, she was also diagnosed with thyroid gland problems.

== Early life ==
Andrea Šušnjara was born on 26 February 1987 in Split. Šušnjara's singing talent was discovered by Huljić when she was sixteen. She was a classmate with his daughter Hana Huljić during their singing classes.

== 2009 Eurovision Song Contest ==
Šušnjara, alongside Igor Cukrov, were the winners of Dora 2009, performing the song "Lijepa Tena" (Beautiful Tena). At Eurovision they performed in the second semi-final as the opening act and qualified for the final as the jury's selected qualifier. In the final, they finished in 18th place with 45 points.

== Magazin ==
In May 2010, Andrea Šušnjara, who was one of the girls who auditioned to be the new singer of Magazin on HRT, became the new singer of the group. Magazin together with Andrea released the debut single "Sijamski blizanci" ("Siamese twins"), which immediately became a huge success in Croatia and internationally. After "Sijamski blizanci", they released the hits; "Kemija", "Još se ne bi udala", "Maslačak", "Luzer", "Muško bez karaktera", "Dušu nemaš da me na njoj nosiš", "Jutro nakon", "Školovana da preživim", "Doktore", "Ima dana" and many others. Šušnjara became the longest-lasting main vocalist of the band lasting 14 years in the band, and they released an album in 2014 titled: Mislim Pozitivno! ("I think Positive!"). In 2017, Magazin together with Andrea, released the song "Žena, a ne broj" (Woman, not a number), which gained popularity in Croatia, gaining 17 million views as of 2025. Her decision to leave the group in 2024 came after her personal wish for change, putting herself in the first place and bringing order to her life.

== Solo career ==
Andrea made her first attempts at a solo career in 2004 with two songs. The first one was called "Noah" and had its premiere at Dora 2004. The song was written by the Huljić duo and arranged by Remi Kazinoti. The other song, called "Kad zažmirim" (English: When I Close My Eyes) premiered at Split 2004 and was also written by the same trio. In 2005, Šušnjara attempted to perform at Dora again with the song "Ljudi s mora" (English: People from the Sea) written by the same trio. Both songs were then included on the EP Singlovi 2004-2005.

In 2014, she released "Zapjevajmo onu našu" in collaboration with Mejasi. The song was written by Denis Dumančić, the lyrics are by Denis Dumančić, arrangement by Branimir Mihaljević/Denis Dumančić, the direction of the video is Filip Dizdar.

On 2 December 2024, Šušnjara released the song "Ja bi još" (English: I Would More) written by Tonči and Vjekoslava Huljić while arranged by Tonči Huljić and Hrvoje Domazet. The music video was finalized by NexGen video production by Marijan Lilić. The song had its pre-premiere at club Mint. It opens with Šušnjara in a black nightgown in front of a television screen which she turns on. The video quickly shows the story of a love pair trying to catch each others hands. Then paper scrolls and candles, a statue of a female torso and a guitarist follow. The choreographist and the dancer of the band is Alen Sesartić, Hrvoje Domazet serves as the guitarist, make-up was finished by Šejla Zekić of Šminkeraj Split and hair stylist was Hairbook by Ivica Šuljak. Šušnjara emotionally sings the song dressed in a long black gown with long black sleeves. Statues of a female bust and a male with a long beard are shown. She seductively caresses her breasts and briefly touches her face. The song was a commercial success, debuting at number 27 on the chart issue dated 11 November 2024. The following week, it moved to a position of number 16. Its peak position was at number 8 on the chart issue 2 December 2024.

On 10 December 2024, Šušnjara performed "Luzer" at the Split Advent.

The beginning of 2025 saw the live performance of four of her songs on the Dalibor Petko show, including "Ja bi još", "Žena, a ne broj", "Kemija" and "Jutro nakon".

On 2 June 2025, Šušnjara released the summer song titled "Normala" (English: Normalcy) written by the Huljić duo and arranged by Hrvoje Domazet. A music video was directed by Leo Bartulica. It shows an "Alb 2" yacht cruising through the sea and a lavishly dressed Šušnjara lip-syncing the lyrics. She is also seen at a casino. During the scenes next to a pool she is shown with a golden star earring. She is surrounded by friends and cheering.

On 27 August 2025, Šušnjara performed "Normala" at the CMC Festival in Vodice. She appeared backed up by four female dancers all clad in black backed by a blue and red animations on the screen backdrop. For New Year's Eve 2026, Šušnjara appeared on the Dalibor Petko show where she performed five of her songs.

On 13 March 2026, she released the self-written song "Ljubavni kockari" ("Love Betters"), a ballad with lyrics dedicated to her deceased pet dog. Initially, written as an anti-love song, the ballad was repurposed following the avalanche of emotions she felt at the loss of her pet. A music video directed by Leo Bartulica was filmed at Ivan Mesturovic. She performed the song live at the Dalibor Petko Show on 6 May 2026.

== Artistry ==
During one interview, Šušnjara revealed that her relationship to Magazin was the only one where she did not have an argument. She added how her approach to singing was that she went onstage with no makeup, no hairstyle, wearing only what she put on herself impromptu. She also shared how she was not understood by the public which was very quick to judge her based on how she was dressed, while she did not even manage to find a mirror.

== Private life ==
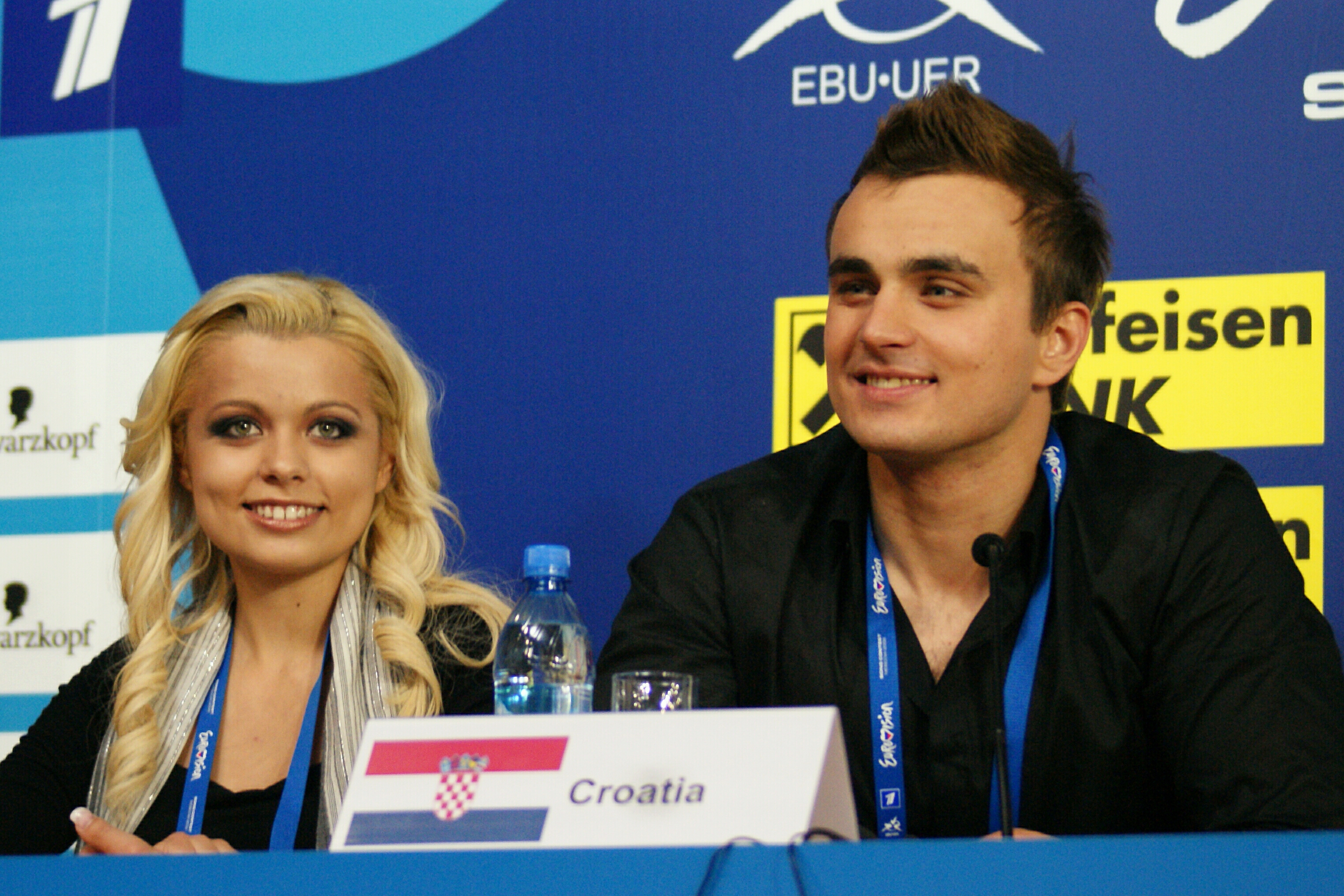
Igor Cukrov and Andrea Šušnjara at a press conference at Eurovision Song Contest 2009.

Šušnjara has stated that she does not want to expose her private life to the public too much. Nevertheless, it was known to the public that she was in a relationship to Marko Juričić. They were seen together at Vodicama Festival in 2019, but rumor had it they terminated the relationship two years later.

Šušnjara has shared how she does not want to be compared to any of the other singers of Magazin. During an interview, Andrea Šušnjara confessed that she smokes cigarettes and has a Bosnian boyfriend, who she labelled as "ours".

Šušnjara grew up without her father, only with her mother and grandmother and she confessed Huljić took over the paternal figure she longed for. According to her, he eentered her life when she was 16 years old and gave her a direction. During a 2024 interview, she confessed how she was in a good relationship with her father then. Nevertheless, she is still her own provider and takes care of herself.

Šušnjara is a Christian Catholic. In 2007, Šušnjara got diagnosed with ovarian cancer during a routine gynecological checkup. She described the experience as very painful and avoids talking about it too much since "many people put you in their own drawers". When a cyst was found on her ovary, she had to undergo surgery two days after the diagnosis. She also had to undergo three cycles of chemotherapy, following which she successfully survived the disease. In 2023, she got diagnosed with a disease of the thyroid gland, which she herself believed was due to her fast-paced lifestyle and overconsumption of junk food.

Šušnjara had a pet dog, a Pug called Coca. On 13 January 2026, she took to her Instagram account to share that the dog had died, along with a message that she was worried about the lack of empathy towards animals and other people she was seeing around her.

== Discography ==
with Magazin

- Mislim pozitivno! (2014)

Preceded by Kraljevi ulice & 75 Cents with "Romanca"	Croatia in the Eurovision Song Contest; 2009 (with Igor Cukrov)	Succeeded by Feminnem with "Lako je sve"
