= Žanamari Perčić =

Croatian singer-songwriter (born 1981)

- Born: Žanamari Lalić; 8 September 1981 (age 45); Makarska, Split-Dalmatia, Croatia
- Genres: Pop; pop rock
- Occupation: Singer-songwriter
- Years active: 2002–present
- Label: Croatia Records
- Member of: J'Animals

Žanamari Perčić (née Lalić; born 8 September 1981) is a Croatian singer-songwriter who rose to prominence in 2004 as the first winner of Hrvatski Idol, the Croatian version of Pop Idol. After her initial rise to fame, she participated in various Croatian reality shows, including the 2013 series Ples sa zvijezdama (Croatian Strictly Come Dancing) and Tvoje lice zvuči poznato (Croatian Your Face Sounds Familiar).

== Life and career ==
Žanamari was born and raised in Makarska. In 2001, she obtained a degree in management and moved to Germany, where she released a single "Feels like Heaven" in 2002. She also competed in Deutschland sucht den Superstar, a talent show by RTL Television.

After she won NOVA TV's talent show Hrvatski Idol, the Croatian version of Pop Idol, she competed in Croatian music festivals, winning an award at Zadarfest 2004 for best performance and choreography. She was also featured at the Croatian Radio Festival with the single "Bar su suze besplatne" in 2005, in 2008 with "Bijela robinja" and in 2009 with her most successful song "Crni leptire". In 2008 and 2010, she performed at the CMC Festival with the singles "Da mi daš još samo jednu noć" and "Ljubav". She has also competed in the HRT Dora Eurosong pre-selection in 2005, 2006 and 2007.

Her first solo album, Žanamari, was released in 2005 by Croatia Records.

From 2008 to 2011, she toured with her supporting band, Syndrome, and also performed with the Matija Dedić Electric Band.

In 2010, she formed the pop-rock band J'Animals, a group which got its name from Žanamari's pseudonym, J'Animale.

Wanting to express herself not just as a vocalist but also as a songwriter in composing a new record, she co-wrote the first couple of songs with producers Dejan Orešković and Igor Ivanović in the spring of 2010, then recruited guitarist Jura Geci and keyboardist Nikola Vranić, both formerly of Voodoo Lizards, along with drummer Emil Kranjčić, formerly of Dead by Mistake. Together, they invited bassist Sebastian Jurić, from Sane, and guitarist Gordan Dragić, from Skaut, who played acoustic shows with Žanamari during her solo career. Dragić soon became a major songwriter for the band's debut album together with Žanamari, and the rest of the band collaborated on the arrangements.

They released a video for their first single, "Nije napola", in April 2011, then performed with their second single "Oteti pa vraćeni" at the CMC Festival in June 2011, and along with the third hit single, "Kreten pomalo", that released in November 2011, the new album Druga vrsta was released by Croatia Records. The album also contains three bonus hit singles from Žanamaris' solo career: "Crni leptire", "Ljubav" and "Ne pitaj me", furthermore spawned another two new hit singles, "Krugovi" and "Dijagnoza", promoted at the CMC Festival in June 2012. The band also rewrote their existing hit singles in English, starting with songs Let Me Burn, The Master and The Wall Of End and published them independently on their SoundCloud profile.

In August 2012 bassist Tomislav Šušak from Vatra and Skaut, formerly of Kinoklub and Ramirez, join them on tour and shortly after in the place of Jura Geci came a new guitarist Dario Bulatović, known for his engagement in band Violate.

In 2012 they toured with the Croatian band Goran Bare i Majke and released a live tour follow footage video single Gentleman in January 2013. In May 2013 they supported Joe Satriani in Zagreb and Ljubljana on the Unstoppable Momentum World Tour and in the summer of 2013 successfully promoted their brand new single Kao da nema sutra on two biggest rock festivals in the region EXIT Festival (Novi Sad) and Arsenal Fest (Kragujevac).

In September 2013, since Dario Bulatović and Tomislav Šušak left the band due to engagement in their own projects, and guitarist Rene Coner and bassist Mario Perčić joined J'Animals. In December 2013, they released new official single "Oči u oči" b/w "The Game of Shadows" and announced the official video premiere for January 2014.

In June 2014, Žanamari married Mario Perčić, taking his last name. In May 2015, their first daughter, Gabriela, was born. After a short maternity leave, Žanamari returned to her solo career in December 2015 with her new single "Tako blizu" as a part of the 63rd Zagrebački Festival. At this time, she also announced her new mainstream pop era with the song "U ratu i ljubavi", featuring Aleksandra Kovač, which reached half-a-million YouTube views. The video was produced by her own music and video production company, V.R.H. Productions, with her husband Mario Perčić as video director.

In July 2016, she promoted "Isti se prepoznaju" at the Splitski festival. This led to her performing in the TV show Tvoje Lice Zvuči Poznato (the Croatian version of Your Face Sounds Familiar), aired by Nova TV in autumn of 2016. In 2017, she released "Pina Colada feat. Joshua Macks". After the song reached one million YouTube views, they released another duet, "Licemjeri".

In January 2018, Žanamari released the single "Život je lijep", and in one week of airplay, it entered the Croatian official radio pop chart as the highest new entry. Žanamari and Joshua Macks had a hit in the summer of 2018 with the single Romantika, followed by Žanamari's collaboration with DJ ARIEN on a song Uragan and later on a successful duet with Bosnian pop artist Igor Vukojević on a ballad Srce ne pita. Her latest single is Ubijaš.

== Discography ==
=== Solo ===
Albums

- Žanamari (16 August 2005)

Maxi single

- "Crni leptire" (15 July 2009)

Singles

- "Znam feat. Deen" (2005)
- "Ljubav za jednu noć" (DORA, 2006)
- "Jedino moje" (DORA, 2007)
- "Trag na usnama feat. Mima" (Budva, 2007)
- "Da mi daš još samo jednu noć" (CMC, 2008)
- "Bijela robinja" (HRF, 2008)
- "Sinoć nisi bila tu feat. Kemal Monteno" (2008)
- "Ljubav" (CMC, 2010)
- "Ne pitaj me" (Šansona Šibenik, 2010)
- "I Feel Alone" (2010)
- "U ovoj sobi feat. Hard Time" (2013)
- "Tako blizu" (2015)
- "U ratu i ljubavi feat. Aleksandra Kovač" (2016)
- "Isti se prepoznaju" (Splitski Festival, 2016)
- "Ajde, Ajde" (2016)
- "Sklonište od leda" (2016)
- "Pina Colada feat. Joshua Macks" (2017)
- "Licemjeri feat. Joshua Macks" (2017)
- "Život je lijep" (2018)
- "Kraj programa" (2018)
- "Romantika feat. Joshua Macks" (2018)
- "Uragan feat. ARIEN" (2018)
- "Srce na pita feat. Igor Vukojević" (2019)
- "Ubijaš" (2019)

=== With J'Animals ===
- Druga vrsta (2011)
- Kao da nema sutra (2013)
- "Oči u oči" (2013)
