= Hrvatski Idol =

- Genre: Music competition
- Created by: Simon Fuller
- Based on: Pop Idol by Simon Fuller
- Presented by: Nikolina Božić; Vinko Štefanac (season 1); Predrag Šuka (season 2)
- Judges: Season 1: Đorđe Novković; Miroslav Škoro; Ivanka Boljkovac; Nikša Bratoš; Season 2: Zrinko Tutić; Goran Karan; Ricardo Luque; Marija Husar
- Country of origin: Croatia
- No. of seasons: 2

Original release
- Network: Nova TV
- Release: 2004 – 2005

Related
- Story Supernova Music Talents; Hrvatska traži zvijezdu Superstar

Hrvatski Idol is the Croatian version of Pop Idol. There have been two seasons of Hrvatski Idol. The first one was won by Žanamari Lalić who received 54% of the vote in the final night. Patrick Jurdić won the second season with 50.22% of the vote in the final. Since the number of received phonecalls was only 2.296, Jurdić won with not more than 10 votes over runner-up Lidija Bačić. Both winners did try out on other countries similar casting shows before: Lalić in Germany and Jurdić in both his home country Austria and the Czech Republic. However, both failed to achieve some success on their first tries and were eliminated pretty early in the competition.

Although season one has successful viewership, the sophomore season failed to continue this success. Third season was delayed and after an absence of four years the show returned to Croatian screens under the new name Hrvatska traži zvijezdu on RTL Televizija.

Finalists (with dates of elimination)

Season 1 (2003-04)
Žanamari Lalić	Winner
Pamela Ramljak	5 June
Neda Parmać	29 May
Linda Švarc	22 May
Alan Šćuric	15 May
Ivana Marić	8 May
Denis Mladenović	1 May
Karmen Matković	24 April

Season 2 (2004-05)
Patrick Jurdić	Winner
Lidija Bačić	26 February
Marina Kristić	19 February
Teo Nikolac	12 February
Siniša Vidović	5 February
Ana Bebić	29 January
Karmen Papić	22 January
Ivana Jelečević	15 January

== Season 1 ==
=== Hosts ===
- Nikolina Božić
- Vinko Štefanac

=== Judges ===
- Đorđe Novković
- Miroslav Škoro
- Ivanka Boljkovac
- Nikša Bratoš

=== Auditions ===
- Rijeka (03/17/04)
- Split
- Osijek
- Zagreb

=== Finalists ===
(ages stated at time of contest)

Contestant	Age	Hometown	Voted Off	Liveshow Theme
Žanamari Lalić	22	Split	Winner	Grand Finale
Pamela Ramljak	24	Zagreb	June 5, 2004	Grand Finale
Neda Parmać	18	Split	May 29, 2004	Judges'/Contestant's Choice
Linda Švarc	25	Zagreb	May 22, 2004	The 90s
Alan Šćuric	23	Zagreb	May 15, 2004	The 70s
Ivana Marić	21	Split	May 8, 2004	The 80s
Denis Mladenović	18	Zagreb	May 1, 2004	Film Songs
Karmen Matković	19	Zagreb	April 24, 2004	My Idol

=== Finals Elimination Chart ===
Stage:		Semi Finals				Finals						
Weeks:		12/25	12/26	01/01	01/02	01/15	01/22	01/29	02/05	02/12	02/19	02/26
Place	Contestant	Result										
1	Žanamari Lalić	1										Winner
2	Pamela Ramljak				1							Runner-up
3	Neda Parmać			2		Btm2	Btm3			Btm2	Elim	
4	Linda Švarc			1				Btm2	Btm2	Elim		
5	Alan Šćuric	2						Btm3	Elim			
6	Ivana Marić				2		Btm2	Elim				
7	Denis Mladenović		1			Btm3	Elim					
8	Karmen Matković		2			Elim						

Legend
Female	Male	Safe	Safe first	Safe second	Eliminated

== Season 2 ==
=== Hosts ===
- Nikolina Božić
- Predrag Šuka

=== Judges ===
- Zrinko Tutić
- Goran Karan
- Ricardo Luque
- Marija Husar

=== Auditions ===
- Split (10/31/04)
- Osijek (11/07/04)
- Opatija (11/14/04)
- Zagreb (11/21/04)

=== Finalists ===
(ages stated at time of contest)

Contestant	Age	Hometown	Voted Off	Liveshow Theme
Patrick Jurdić	19	Osijek	Winner	Grand Finale
Lidija Bačić	19	Split	February 26, 2005	Grand Finale
Marina Kristić	21	Zagreb	February 19, 2005	Number 1 Hits
Teo Nikolac	24	Zagreb	February 12, 2005	Love Songs
Siniša Vidović	17	Split	February 5, 2005	Film Hits
Ana Bebić	18	Split	January 29, 2005	My Birth Year
Karmen Papić		Split	January 22, 2005	Croatian Songs
Ivana Jelečević		Osijek	January 15, 2005	My Idol

=== Finals Elimination Chart ===
Stage:		Semi Finals				Finals						
Weeks:		12/25	12/26	01/01	01/02	01/15	01/22	01/29	02/05	02/12	02/19	02/26
Place	Contestant	Result										
1	Patrick Jurdić		1									Winner
2	Lidija Bačić				1	Btm3						Runner-up
3	Marina Kristić			2			Btm3		Btm3	Btm2	Elim	
4	Teo Nikolac	2					Btm2	Btm3	Btm2	Elim		
5	Siniša Vidović			1				Btm2	Elim			
6	Ana Bebić	1						Elim				
7	Karmen Papić				2	Btm2	Elim					
8	Ivana Jelečević		2			Elim						

Legend
Female	Male	Safe	Safe first	Safe second	Eliminated
