= Veljko Despot =

Croatian journalist and music executive (born in 1948)

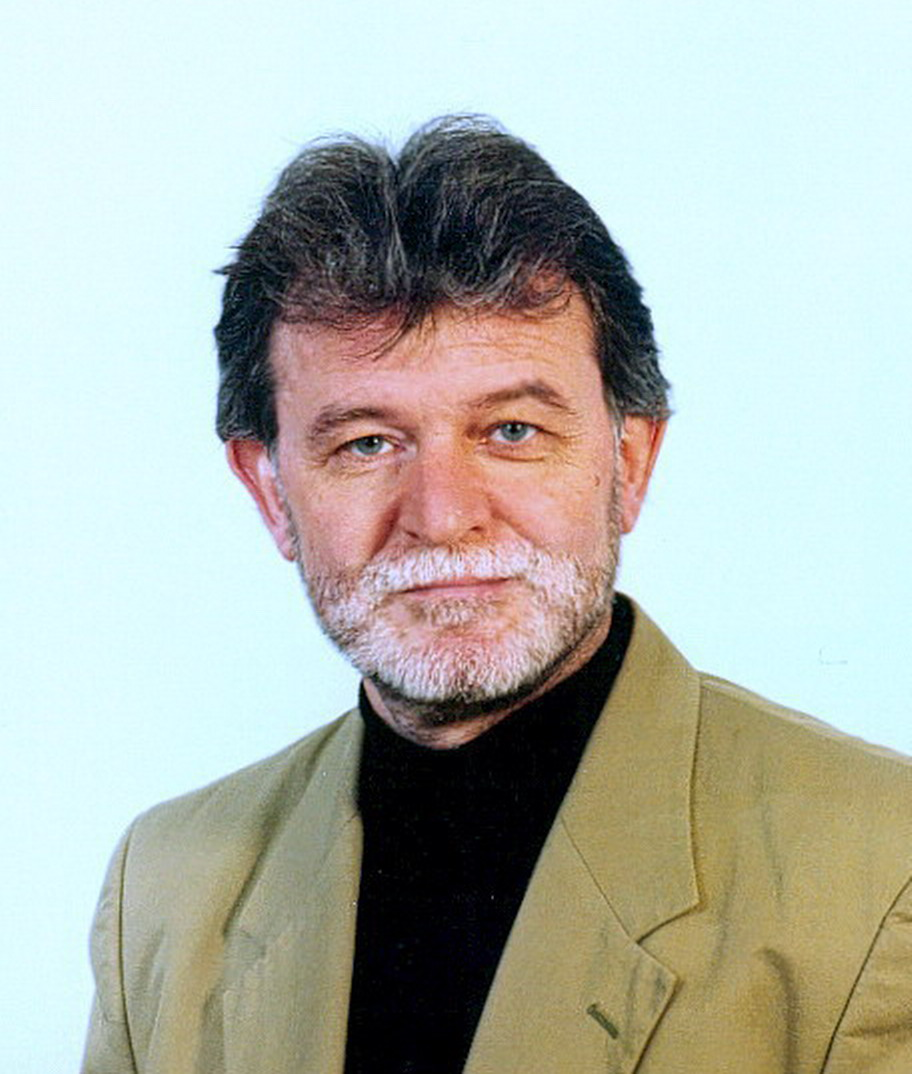
- Despot in 2002
- Born: 4 March 1948 (age 77); Belgrade, PR Serbia, FPR Yugoslavia
- Occupations: Record producer; music manager; record executive; entrepreneur; music journalist
- Spouse: Daniela Despot
- Children: 3

Veljko Despot (born 4 March 1948) is a Croatian music journalist and record business entrepreneur. He has been involved in all aspects of the music industry as manager-director, record label owner, reporter, chief editor, radio and TV program director. In 1998, Despot received recognition from the Croatian government as one of top private entrepreneurs in the country.

Since 1993, Despot has been a member of the National Academy of Recording Arts & Sciences in the United States and since 2000 is also a member of the Latin Academy of Recording Arts & Sciences. In 2013, he was awarded with the Porin Lifetime Achievement Award for outstanding accomplishments in the recording industry in Croatia. It was presented to him on behalf of the Croatian Music Institute by Arsen Dedić.

== Career ==
=== 1960s ===
Despot's career began at the age of 18 in local press ("Plavi vjesnik") reporting from London on swinging sixties and trilling pop and rock scene. He was the first journalist from former Yugoslavia who specialized in covering international popular music, and was the first and only East European journalist to interview The Beatles. This interview was published as one of his first articles, in "Plavi vjesnik" (17 April 1967).

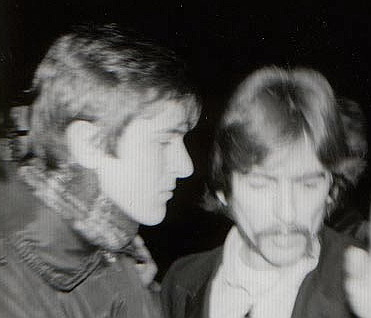
Despot (left) and George Harrison at the Abbey Road Studios in London, 1967

In the late sixties, Despot's articles appeared in several Croatian publications, including Arena, Studio, and Vjesnik, interviewing artists such as Pink Floyd, The Hollies, Bee Gees, The Rolling Stones, Led Zeppelin, Marc Bolan, and The Who. Despot attended recording sessions of The Beatles' Sgt. Pepper's Lonely Hearts Club Band (London, 1967), Rolling Stones' Let It Bleed (London, 1969), Pink Floyd's Ummagumma (London, 1969) and Arsen Dedić's Homo volans (Zagreb, 1973).

In 1967, Despot was part of the very first record producer agreement in Yugoslav recording industry history, producing an EP release for the Slovenian rock group Kameleoni. In 1968, he produced their soundtrack for the film "Sončni krik" ("Sunny Cry") by director Boštjan Hladnik. Despot founded the Jugoslavenski Beatles Fan Club/The Yugoslav Beatles Fan Club in Zagreb in 1968, a branch of The Official Beatles Fan Club which covered most East European countries.

He was also co-founder and on the board of editors of the Zagreb "Pop Express" (1969–1970), one of the first music newspapers in Yugoslavia. Since 1971, he has also contributed to New Musical Express.

From 1968, Despot continued to contribute as a freelance music journalist on radio stations, and from 1972 on the Yugoslavian Radio Television (Jugoslavenska radiotelevizija or Jugoslovenska radio-televizija, JRT), on Croatian Radio Television and subnational radio and TV centers based in Belgrade, Ljubljana and Sarajevo. Throughout the seventies, eighties and nineties Despot had numerous music reports on television, interviews, portraits and special programs, all concerning international popular music. In the mid-seventies he brought the first music videos on Yugoslav television, and in the eighties he introduced Yugoslavia's first music advertising on national TV.

=== 1970s and 1980s ===
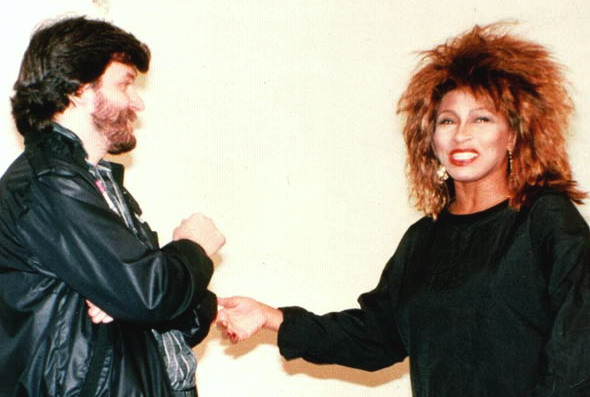
Despot with Tina Turner in Graz, 1985

In 1974, Despot established an international department for Jugoton, acquiring major license deals for the company and working with artists, managers, publishers, and record company executives for their product releases in the territory of former Yugoslavia. From the seventies through the beginning of the nineties, Jugoton had license for several international artists and had exclusive deals with many international record companies, such as EMI, Warner Music, BMG, Decca, Island, Chrysalis, Virgin, Motown and many more.

Despot edited record albums as well, editing Bijelo dugme in 1975 for "Šta bi dao da si na mom mjestu" and in 1976 for "Eto! Baš hoću". Both albums were recorded in Air Studios, London and produced by Neil Harrison.

Despot helped bring to Yugoslavia many important artists, like Deep Purple in 1975, The Rolling Stones (1976), Paul McCartney & Wings (1976), Queen (1979), Elton John (1984), Dire Straits (1985), Laurie Anderson (1990), Eros Ramazzotti (1990, 1994), Pet Shop Boys (1991), David Bowie (1990, 1996, 1997) and many more. For many of these artists it was their first visit in East Europe.

=== 1990s ===
In 1991, after Croatia became independent from the former Yugoslavia, Jugoton became Croatia Records. Despot remained with the company until 1994, when he established his own record company Koncept VD, a label exclusively representing BMG Music, MCA, Geffen Records and GRP Records repertoire in new states in the former Yugoslavia. The label signed domestic artists as well, such as Croatian singer-songwriter Arsen Dedić, and the Soul Fingers from Zagreb. Their albums on Koncept label won the Porin music award for best releases in Croatia, an award which Despot helped to originate as one of founding members of the Croatian Phonographic Association. he Porin was established in 1993 for outstanding achievements in the Croatian recording industry.

In 1999, Despot created Simbol Music, a consulting company that assists music artists and labels.

=== 2000s ===
In 2000 and 2001, he also created the Cantus label (a record division of the Croatian Composers' Society, HDS). He added Croatian artists such as Tony Cetinski, Goran Karan, Matija Dedić, and Tamara Obrovac. Their albums have won many Porin awards as well.

In 2001, Despot contracted with the Neweurope Corporation (NEC) in Florida, a private corporation with a "Click-Media-Mortar" business model centered around the New Europe theme. NEC targets over 28 million first- and second-generation Europeans living in the United States and millions of American fans of European music, screening European recording artists' songs and videos, as well as European TV programs, for marketing in the United States. Despot is now a corporate partner as the Director of Neweurope Media & Entertainment Center (NEMEC).

In 2008, when The National Academy was celebrating its 51st anniversary, Despot was honored as "the heart and soul of our organization... in appreciation and recognition of 15 years of membership in the Academy and supporting its education, advocacy and human services initiatives".

== Personal life ==
Despot was born in Belgrade, Yugoslavia, and since 1950 has lived in Zagreb, Croatia, where his father was a respected businessman. His mother, Mirjana, studied cello at the Zagreb Conservatory under Italian cellist Antonio Janigro and later taught many cellists herself.

Despot is married and has three children.
