= 1991 killings of Serbs in Vukovar =

Killing of Serbs in Coatia

- Part of the Croatian War of Independence
- Location: Vukovar, Croatia
- Date: May–August 1991
- Target: Croatian Serbs
- Attack type: Kidnappings, summary executions, ethnic cleansing
- Deaths: 43–120
- Perpetrator: Croatian forces
- Motive: Anti-Serb sentiment

The 1991 killings of Serbs in Vukovar were a series of incidents in which Serbs living in and around Vukovar during the spring and summer of 1991 were subject to kidnappings and summary executions by armed thugs associated with the Croatian National Guard. These events began as the Croatian War of Independence was starting, prior to the start of the Battle of Vukovar in August of the same year. After the war, some criminal investigations were undertaken, including one of the notable perpetrators Tomislav Merčep, though on the whole the matter remains largely unresolved.

== Background ==
Vukovar is a city in the eastern region of Slavonia, located at the confluence of the Vuka and the Danube rivers. According to the 1991 census, the city was ethnically mixed with Croats making up 47% of the population while Serbs made up 32.3%; 35% of marriages were mixed.

In 1988-89, a series of street protests dubbed anti-bureaucratic revolutions by supporters of Serbian leader Slobodan Milošević succeeded in overthrowing the government of the Socialist Republic of Montenegro, as well as the governments of the Serbian autonomous provinces of Vojvodina and Kosovo, replacing their leaders with Milošević allies. As a result, the western Yugoslav republics of Slovenia and Croatia turned against Milošević. On 8 July 1989, a large Serb nationalist rally was held in Knin, during which banners threatening Yugoslav People's Army (JNA) intervention in Croatia, as well as Chetnik iconography was displayed. Franjo Tudjman, leader of the Croatian Democratic Union (Croatian: Hrvatska demokratska zajednica, HDZ), came to prominence as a Croatian nationalist dissident and pushed for Croatian independence, while he and his party instilled xenophobic rhetoric and attitudes towards the country's Serb minority.

In 1990, following the electoral defeat of the communist government of the Socialist Republic of Croatia by the HDZ, ethnic tensions between Croats and Serbs worsened. The election period in the Vukovar municipality was marked with intense electioneering along national lines. The Serbs were well represented in the SKH-SDP, beyond their representation in the total population. In the villages around Vukovar, numerous protests were organized against the rise of the HDZ on the national level, following the politics of Slobodan Milošević in nearby Vojvodina and Serbia. The municipality committee of the SKH-SDP protested the Croatian delegation's withdrawal from the 14th Congress of the League of Communists of Yugoslavia. The local HDZ on the other hand organized rallies in Croat-populated villages, advocated for being seen as a representative of all Croats, and represented a grass-roots, less educated section of the population of the municipality, with a relatively inexperienced leadership composed of people outside the intelligentsia, which also made overtures towards reassessing the legacy of the Ustaše, causing dismay among the local Serbs. The election itself went through generally peacefully, with four members of SKH-SDP and an independent elected into the Sabor, four of which were ethnic Croats and one ethnic Serb, and all five were publicly known as people interested in peaceful coexistence. The HDZ was the largest minority party in the local council, and held sway in local governments of Croat-populated villages, while the SKH-SDP dominated the rest, as it received votes from the Serbs, other ethnicities, and some Croats as well.

After the election, the Serbs created a local branch of the Serbian Democratic Party (SDS) in June 1990, which initiated rallies converse in content to those of the HDZ but similar in the style of nationalism, and also gained power by having numerous SKH-SDP delegates switch parties. The municipality government of Vukovar was led by Slavko Dokmanović, a Serb of Trpinja and his deputy Marin Vidić Bili, a Croat of Lovas. In the summer of 1990, Dokmanović appeared on a rally organized by the SDS in Srb, and joined their newly-founded Serbian National Council (SNV). This was met with widespread condemnation, and he was forced to leave that position. Nevertheless, in August 1990, SDS organized a referendum in Serb-populated villages in the region about establishing a Serbian autonomy, that passed overwhelmingly.

== Prelude ==
The Yugoslav People's Army confiscated the weapons of Croatia's Territorial Defence in order to minimise the possibility of violence following the elections. On 17 August, 1990 inter-ethnic tensions escalated into an open revolt of the Croatian Serbs, centered on the predominantly Serb-populated areas of the Dalmatian hinterland around Knin, and parts of Lika, Kordun, Banovina and eastern Croatia. After the Pakrac clash of March 1991, SDS and SNV publicly encouraged a state of psychosis amongst the Serbs in the region, starting a refugee wave from Serb-inhabited villages, following public claims by local SDS leader Goran Hadžić about how their expulsion was imminent. Later the same month, Hadžić was also involved in the Plitvice Lakes incident, which escalated into a crisis in the Serb-inhabited villages in the region. While the Croatian Ministry of the Interior released Hadžić in an effort to calm down the insurgency, the parts of the HDZ loyal to Tomislav Merčep were keen on preparing for war. SKH-SDP official Stipo Lovrinčević and the local police chief Slavko Sredoselec had daily meetings with Vukovar Serbs whose properties were bombed and whose houses were shot at during night time, blaming the incidents on a handful of extremists.

In April 1991, the self-proclaimed SAO Krajina declared its intention to secede from Croatia and join the Republic of Serbia while the Government of the Republic of Croatia declared it a rebellion. At the beginning of 1991, Croatia had no regular army. In an effort to bolster its defence, it doubled the number of police personnel to about 20,000. Croatian authorities started organizing a military force called the Croatian National Guard (ZNG) in April and May 1991. Tensions intensified on 2 May 1991 when twelve Croatian policemen were ambushed and massacred by the SAO Krajina militia and White Eagles members in the village of Borovo Selo, near Vukovar. On 3 May, Yugoslav People's Army (JNA) units moved into Borovo Selo and on 12 May, Croatian Serbs voted in a referendum to stay in Yugoslavia.

SKH-SDP controlled the media in the Vukovar region, including the Vukovar radio station and the Vukovarske novine newspaper, whereas the Croatian weekly Slobodni tjednik was used by the HDZ to promote nationalist causes, including the practice of publishing the names of Serbs in Vukovar who they claimed to have participated in illegal activities, which was often merely a ploy to get people in lucrative positions to be replaced. In early May, Croatian police took over the Vukovar radio station and replaced Serb members of the station with Croats. On 19 May, a Croatian nationwide referendum on sovereignty was held in which 94% voted in favor. Violence in and around Vukovar worsened after the independence referendum, with gun and bomb attacks reported in the town and surrounding villages in June 1991.

Since early May 1991, the municipality government of Vukovar was largely dysfunctional. Dokmanović stopped coming to work in Vukovar citing personal safety reasons, and Marin Vidić Bili replaced him, while Stipo Lovrinčević retired from politics for health reasons. On 16 June, Merčep was named the Secretary of People's Defense, and effectively took power. Serbs in Vukovar were subjected to harassment as the Croatian police conducted numerous random searches of their homes and arrested an increasing number of them for 'activities against the Croatian republic'.

On 25 June, Croatia declared its independence from Yugoslavia. The SAO Eastern Slavonia, Baranja and Western Syrmia was proclaimed the same day.

== Crimes ==
Croatian paramilitaries led by Tomislav Merčep terrorized Serbs in and around Vukovar. Merčep was at the time a leading official in the Croatian Democratic Union (HDZ) in the Vukovar area, and for a time had the formal position of the Secretary of the People's Defense, which he used to organize Croatian paramilitaries.

In mid-May 1991, 25 year old Miodrag Nađ, a member of the Serbian Democratic Party, was killed near Vukovar in a drive-by shooting. Three Serbs were killed in Bršadin and one in Sotin in the time after the Battle of Borovo Selo and June 29, when Jovan Jakovljević, an ethnic Serb who was known in the community, was shot and killed at his doorstep in Vukovar on 29 June 1991. According to his son, Jakovljević's murder was meant to send a message to Serbs in Vukovar that the various threats received before that time would result in mass murder. On 25 July 1991, members of the ZNG apprehended Savo Damjanović and he was never seen again. Similar kind of kidnappings and disappearances of Serbs occurred with Mladen Mrkić on 31 July and Željko Paić on 10 August.

Serbs were subjected to arbitrary arrests and forced interrogations, while their homes and cafes were blown up. In one case, three Serbs were taken to the banks of the Danube river where they were shot and killed, their bodies thrown into the water. The Serbian daily Novosti reported that the bodies of six males were recovered in the Danube from 12 July to August 1991 and autopsies found that they were all shot with firearms. It further states that over a hundred Serbs were imprisoned and tortured in the basement of the Secretariat of National Defence building. The terror prompted an exodus of Serbs from Vukovar. According to documentation of refugee arrivals from Belgrade, a total of 13,734 Serbs fled the town during the summer of 1991. A number of civilians were reported to have been shot and killed by ZNG forces in the settlement of Borovo Naselje in July and August 1991, including women and children.

Merčep's formal power lasted until 23 July when the Zagreb government intervened to reinstate Vidić as the Commissioner for the city of Vukovar. The situation was so unbearable that in August 1991, Marin Vidić wrote a letter to Croatian President Franjo Tuđman complaining about Merčep's activities. At the intervention of Josip Manolić, Merčep was then moved out of Vukovar, using a helicopter, to be made an advisor to the interior minister instead. From where he would soon move to the Pakračka Poljana camp.

Figures of victims range between 50 and 120, with the latter being provided as the highest estimate by the Serb National Council. SNV itself keeps a record of at least fifteen individuals who met a similar fate, and reports on ICTY investigators having records about 86 such people. The Helsinki Committee for Human Rights collected data about at least 19 instances of Serbs being led away for interrogation and never being seen again. NGOs in the city state that a total of 86 Serbs were killed or disappeared during Merčep's control of the town. Jovan Jakovljević's son spoke out publicly about how only 43 deaths and missing persons were formally reported, suspecting the real number to be much higher.

All of these crimes are believed to have occurred prior to the Battle of Vukovar in August 1991, which is when the town officially became a war zone.

== Aftermath ==
In August 1991, the Croatian Serb forces, acting under the operational control of the JNA clashed with the ZNG around Osijek, Vukovar and Vinkovci, and the fighting in eastern Slavonia led to ZNG blockades of JNA barracks in those cities and limited fighting against the garrisons there.

Vukovar fell to the JNA on 18 November 1991. It is estimated that 1,800 defenders of Vukovar and civilians were killed, 800 went missing. Many captured Croatian soldiers and civilians were summarily executed after the battle. Journalists witnessed one such killing in Vukovar's main street. They also reported seeing the streets strewn with bodies in civilian attire. Several war crimes were committed by Serb forces after the battle, including the Vukovar massacre of up to 264 wounded patients and medical staff, taken from the Vukovar hospital. There were also incidents of war rape, for which two soldiers were later convicted. The non-Serb population of the town and the surrounding region was systematically ethnically cleansed, and at least 20,000 of Vukovar's inhabitants were forced to leave. Thousands more were transferred to prison camps in Serbia and rebel-controlled Croatia. Serbs who fought on the Croatian side were regarded as traitors by their captors and treated particularly harshly, enduring savage beatings.

Together with SAO Western Slavonia and SAO Krajina, in February 1992 this region would formally become part of the self-declared proto-state Republic of Serb Krajina (RSK) that was proclaimed in December 1991. After the end of the war, Croatia and local Serb authorities signed the Erdut agreement in November 1995 and the region was reintegrated into the Croatian republic.

== Investigations ==
Investigators from the International Criminal Tribunal for the former Yugoslavia (ICTY) collected evidence in 1996 and 1997 regarding crimes against Serbs in Vukovar. Serbs have long voiced their concerns about the crimes committed against them in the months leading up to the fall of the Vukovar and the lack of accountability for the perpetrators.

The topic of Vukovar is a sensitive issue for Croats who see the city as a symbol of their suffering during the war. In 2012, the journalist Drago Hedl opined that Merčep's crimes in Vukovar against Serbs might never be investigated in part, because of the significance of Vukovar for Croats.

Merčep was only tried and sentenced for failing to prevent crimes against Serbs by his units in Zagreb and Pakračka Poljana. He was sentenced to seven years in 2017 by the Zagreb Supreme Court. In March 2020, he was released on parole due to his worsening health; he died in November 2020.

== Sources ==
- Armatta, Judith (2010). Twilight of Impunity: The War Crimes Trial of Slobodan Milosevic. Durham, North Carolina: Duke University Press. ISBN 978-0-8223-4746-0.
- Sremac, Danielle S. (1999). War of Words: Washington Tackles the Yugoslav Conflict. Westport, Connecticut: Greenwood Publishing Group. ISBN 978-0-275-96609-6.
- Central Intelligence Agency, Office of Russian and European Analysis (2002). Balkan Battlegrounds: A Military History of the Yugoslav Conflict, 1990–1995. Washington, D.C.: Central Intelligence Agency. ISBN 978-0-16-066472-4. OCLC 50396958.
- Bartrop, Paul Robert (2012). "Hadžić, Goran (b. 1958)". A Biographical Encyclopedia of Contemporary Genocide: Portraits of Evil and Good. ABC-CLIO. ISBN 9780313386787.
- Filipović, Vladimir (2019). "Stranačka politika u Vukovaru 1990-1991" [Party Politics in the Vukovar in 1990-1991]. Annals of the Croatian Political Science Association (in Croatian). 16 (1). Croatian Political Science Association: 97–115. doi:10.20901/an.16.05. ISSN 1847-5299. S2CID 213013973 – via Hrčak.
