= Murder of the Zec family =

1991 murder in Zagreb, Croatia

- Location: Zagreb, Croatia
- Date: 7 December 1991
- Target: Croatian Serbs
- Attack type: Mass killing
- Deaths: 3
- Perpetrators: Munib Suljić, Siniša Rimac, Igor Mikola (Members of Tomislav Merčep's Paramilitary unit)

The murder of the Zec family occurred in Zagreb, Croatia on 7 December 1991, during the Croatian War of Independence, when a squad of five Croatian militiamen shot dead three members of a Serb family: Mihajlo Zec, his wife Marija, and their 12-year-old daughter, Aleksandra. Two other Zec children escaped. The murderers were apprehended, but released after a controversial court decision in 1992.

After a long period of apparent negligence and cover-up, the Zec family murder was never addressed by the Croatian legal system, but the government agreed to compensate the surviving family members in a 2004 court settlement. The main perpetrators of this murder were given prison sentences on separate crimes.

== Murder ==
At around 11:00 p.m. on 7 December 1991, the Zec family home near Zagreb was surrounded by five people: Siniša Rimac, Munib Suljić, Igor Mikola, Nebojša Hodak and Snježana Živanović. They invaded the premises purportedly to arrest Mihajlo Zec, a butcher by profession, due to alleged links to rebel Krajina Serbs. Four of the men were members of Tomislav Merčep's paramilitary unit, reserve units of the Croatian Ministry of Internal Affairs. In a later leak of President Tuđman's transcripts, Merčep was quoted in 1995 as telling Tuđman the murder was ordered by Zvonimir Trusić, who in turn was, according to Merčep, a subordinate of then Minister of Foreign Affairs Zvonimir Šeparović and then-Minister of the Interior Ivan Vekić. This testimony was never investigated by a court.

Mihajlo ran out onto the street and tried to escape, but Rimac shot him from a distance of thirty meters. After that, they tied up his wife, Marija, and one of their daughters, Aleksandra, threw them into a van with no license plates and drove to a mountain lodge near Medvednica. Once on Sljeme, they were killed and dumped innto a garbage pit. Aleksandra's siblings, Gordana and Dušan, managed to successfully hide and fled to their grandmother's home in Banja Luka. Subsequent investigations purport that Rimac allegedly did not want Aleksandra to be killed. The girl was shot in the head with a Heckler & Koch-branded rifle by Suljić, an ethnic Bosnian.

== Investigation ==
Just a few days after the crime, the police arrested the perpetrators, and during the early investigation they admitted to the liquidation and described it in detail. However, these confessions were made without the presence of their lawyers. This major procedural error meant that there were no legal witnesses of executions. There was testimony from witnesses who saw Rimac kill Mihajlo Zec. Others testified Mikola had confessed to the killing. Police expertise at the time proved that the weapons seized from the accused were identical to those used to commit the murders. A forensic examination of the perpetrators' van proved it was used to transport Aleksandra and Marija Zec. The County Court in Zagreb did not take any of this into account and rendered a verdict of not guilty.

On 19 February 1992, the Supreme Court of Croatia reviewed and remanded the case. On 9 July 1992, the County Court in Zagreb again rendered a not-guilty verdict. The Croatian judicial system was criticized for this. Most legal experts argued the verdict was far-fetched and included a highly dubious interpretation of legal provisions, due to strong political pressure exerted on the court.

== Aftermath ==
After their release, Suljić and Hodak maintained criminal lifestyles that were extensively covered in local newspapers. Rimac became a bodyguard of the Minister of Defence Gojko Šušak and progressed to a high rank in the Croatian Army. Mikola escaped the limelight by moving to Herzegovina, while Snježana Živković successfully evaded all punishment. On 30 May 1995, Rimac received the Order of Nikola Šubić Zrinski in recognition of "war-time heroism", awarded by Franjo Tuđman.

According to the Croatian weekly magazine Nacional, the protections were extended by Tuđman himself. In 1992, Stjepan Mesić allegedly requested from Tuđman that the case to be resolved as soon as possible, but Tuđman replied: "Let it be, maybe I will still need those guys".

Journalist Davor Butković stated that Vladimir Šeks, who at the time of the original trial was a public prosecutor of Republic of Croatia, stated he was saddened by the Zec case, and felt guilty that the killers were not punished. In 2004, Šeks told Berislav Jelinić of Nacional that he was saddened by the case but bore no responsibility. In 2005, Rimac, Suljić and Mikola were convicted of the murder of Aleksandar "Saša" Antić in the "Pakračka poljana" case, where the same unit committed numerous war crimes against Serbs (such as the Zec family) as well as certain Croatians who had fallen into disfavor and taken prisoner, including Antić and Marina Nuić in 1991. The exact reasons for the murders of Antić, Nuić, and other ethnic Croats in Pakračka poljana remain unclear. Nuić's body was never located but Miro Bajramović, who was quoted in an interview with Feral Tribune as saying he had killed 86 people, 72 with his own hands, in Pakračka. He attested that Nuić had been raped numerous times before being shot dead, and her body buried at nearby Janja Lipa, where it remains, having never been disinterred. That case was first brought to trial in 1997, but went through several hearings between 1999 and 2001.

Suljić, the first shooter in that case, eventually received a sentence of 10 years. Siniša Rimac was sentenced to eight years. Igor Mikola was convicted as an accessory to murder as well as the illegal detention and extortion of Miloš Ivošević, Radom Pajić and Marko Grujić, and sentenced to five years in prison. Two other men were convicted of the latter crime with Mikola. After the verdict, Rimac was arrested, while Suljić and Mikola failed to appear at the sentencing.

A year earlier, Igor Mikola was extradited from Bosnia and Herzegovina to Croatia after serving a 27-month prison sentence in the Zenica prison for the attempted extortion of one Mladen Žulj, owner of a gas station in Grude. He fled to Peru where he surrendered to police in 2014 following a drug shootout. He was extradited to Croatia in 2015 to serve the remainder of his sentence for Pakračka Poljana.

Nebojša Hodak was sentenced in June 2005 to one year in prison in a different case of attempted extortion.

Munib Suljić had personally surrendered to the International Criminal Tribunal for the former Yugoslavia in The Hague in June 2006. He was extradited to Croatia to serve his 12-year prison sentence, but died in a prison hospital in Svetošimunska Street, Zagreb, on 25 August 2006.

== Compensation to surviving family members ==
The surviving Zec children, siblings Dušan and Gordana, sued the Republic of Croatia with the assistance of Croatian attorneys Ante Nobilo and Mara Mihočević. Near the end of the court case in the spring of 2004 the Ivo Sanader government agreed to a settlement and compensation of 1,500,000 Croatian kuna.

== In fiction ==
The Zec affair was an inspiration for Alabaster Sheep (Croatian: Ovce od gipsa), Jurica Pavičić's debut novel published in 1997, and Vinko Brešan's 2003 film Witnesses, based on Pavičić's novel. The novel is loosely based on actual events. Some deviations from the facts of the case - most notably the fact that the character modeled on Aleksandra Zec survives, having been rescued by the protagonists - have been a subject of controversy, and both the film and the novel have been criticized for presenting a watered-down depiction of the event.

A 2014 play titled Aleksandra Zec, written and directed by Oliver Frljić, was explicitly based on the Zec affair, using real-life details such as police photographs and confessions of the perpetrators.
