= Miljenko Smoje =

Croatian writer and journalist

- Born: 14 February 1923; Split, Kingdom of Serbs, Croats and Slovenes (now Croatia)
- Died: 25 October 1995 (aged 72); Split, Croatia
- Occupations: Writer, journalist
- Spouse: Lepa Čatipović (m. 1963; died 2016)
- Writing career
- Language: Croatian
- Notable works: Malo misto; Velo misto

Miljenko Smoje (14 February 1923 – 25 October 1995) was a Croatian writer and journalist.

== Biography ==
Smoje was born in Split, at the time in the Kingdom of Yugoslavia, in a family of poor labourers. The neighbourhood where he grew up was known for its support for anarchism, socialism and other left-wing ideologies. This would later influence Smoje's work and help him develop a strong dislike of authorities and the establishment.

Smoje finished high school in Split in 1941, but his further education was interrupted by the Axis invasion of Yugoslavia and Split being occupied by Italy. Smoje joined the Communist Party of Yugoslavia and took part in the local resistance movement. However, due to his rebellious nature, he was expelled from the Party, but he survived that, as well as a brief incarceration by Italian authorities. After the end of the war he finished college and worked as a teacher. In 1950 he took a job as a reporter for the Split daily newspaper Slobodna Dalmacija, where he would write until his formal retirement in 1979.

As a reporter, Smoje developed a specific style that included use of Čakavština dialect in his articles. His specialty was articles about ordinary people and through the decades he travelled over Dalmatia chronicling many aspects of its life. Later he used many of those experiences as the basis for his short stories, plays and novels. He liked to inject all of his work with a strong dose of humour, laced with elements of every-day tragedy. All this helped Smoje become one of the most respected and more popular writers of former Yugoslavia, as well as arguably the greatest humourist of Croatian literature.

It was the medium of television which helped Smoje become famous. In 1970 he wrote the script for Naše malo misto (also known as Malo misto), a mini-series chronicling three decades of life in small Dalmatian coastal town. The series featured many memorable characters that would later become part of local culture. Smoje also showed ability to use broad comedy as a way to criticise aspects of Communism. The series nevertheless became an instant hit and grew in popularity through the decades.

In 1980 Smoje tried to repeat the success with Velo misto, a more ambitious project chronicling life in Split between 1910 and 1947. Velo misto became very popular and developed cult status of its own. After his retirement Smoje continued to write for Slobodna Dalmacija and Nedjeljna Dalmacija weekly.

In the late 1980s and early 1990s he opposed Croatian nationalism and for that reason he was snubbed by the media controlled by Franjo Tuđman and his ruling Croatian Democratic Union. When Tuđman's supporter Miroslav Kutle took over Slobodna Dalmacija in 1993, Smoje began to write for the satirical weekly Feral Tribune. Semi-official snub of Miljenko Smoje ended in late 1990s when his shows were allowed to be aired on Croatian Radiotelevision.

Smoje was married twice. He is buried in Žrnovnica near Split.

== Sources ==
- Smoje, Miljenko at enciklopedija.hr (in Croatian)
