= Smoje =

Smoje is a surname. Notable people with the surname include:

- Dario Smoje (born 1978), Croatian footballer
- Ivo Smoje (born 1978), Croatian footballer
- Miljenko Smoje (1923–1995), Croatian writer
