= Feral Tribune =

Croatian political weekly magazine

- Categories: Satirical news magazine
- First issue: 1984 (as a weekly supplement in Nedjeljna Dalmacija); June 1993 (as an independent weekly magazine)
- Final issue: 19 June 2008
- Country: Croatia
- Based in: Split
- Language: Croatian
- Website: feral.hr
- ISSN: 1333-9109

Feral Tribune was a Croatian political weekly magazine. Based in Split, it first started as a political satire supplement in Nedjeljna Dalmacija (the Sunday edition of the Slobodna Dalmacija daily newspaper) before evolving into an independent satirical weekly in 1993. It became a popular political weekly in the 2000s before ceasing publication in June 2008.

The magazine, whose name was a play on Herald Tribune (see below), and which billed itself as a "weekly magazine for Croatian anarchists, protesters and heretics", commonly included a provocative satirical photomontage on the cover page, a short news section (titled "Informbiro"), editorials, interviews, a satirical section (titled "Feral Tromblon"), and sections on music, books and the Internet.

Another popular section, titled "Greatest Shits", included a collection of ludicrous statements made in the Croatian media by politicians and other public figures in the previous week. The magazine typically had between 50 and 100 pages in total. It was originally printed in black and white, later changed to full color glossy paper, but then reverted to black and white. In 1994 Feral Tribune also launched a book publishing department which published a series of works by renowned contemporary authors and intellectuals from ex-Yugoslav countries, such as Arsen Dedić, Slavenka Drakulić, Milan Kangrga, Drago Hedl, Mirko Kovač, Izet Sarajlić and Nenad Veličković, foreign writers such as Isaiah Berlin, Norberto Bobbio, Leonard Cohen and George Soros, as well as works by their in-house columnists such as Boris Dežulović and Viktor Ivančić.

Although the magazine was hugely popular in the 1990s and had received a number of international awards during the period, its circulation gradually declined in the 2000s. Following a series of financial difficulties and failed takeover negotiations with Europapress Holding, the magazine was forced to cease publication in 2008 and published its final issue on 19 June 2008. In March 2010 a digital archive of all articles ever published in Feral Tribune was published in the form of a four-disc DVD set.

== History ==
=== Beginnings ===
Feral was conceived in 1984 by a trio of young journalists Viktor Ivančić, Predrag Lucić, and Boris Dežulović. The trio named itself by combining letters in their names to form "Viva Ludež", their neologism for goofy madness. Their works initially appeared in the weekly humour supplement of Nedjeljna Dalmacija in 1988. After a month, Feral was banned after it ran a satirical piece ridiculing then Serbian president Slobodan Milošević's nationalist and anti-establishment protests. The publication then moved to Split's daily newspaper, Slobodna Dalmacija. In 1993, when Miroslav Kutle, a businessman with close ties to the governing Croatian Democratic Union (HDZ) bought Slobodna Dalmacija, the weekly split off to form its own independent publication. On 1 June 1993, the publication launched its first independent issue with the headline "Ante Pavelić Found Alive", ironically suggesting that his political spirit was alive in Croatian life.

=== Rise in popularity and legal issues ===
Feral received little attention until Yugoslavia broke apart in the early 1990s. The magazine's favorite subject soon became Franjo Tudjman. A winter 1993 issue depicted a photograph of Milošević and Tudjman in bed naked together with a headline that read: "Is this what we fought for?". Once the issue hit the streets, it quickly sold out all 50,000 copies. Meanwhile, Ivančić, the magazine's editor, was conscripted to the Croatian army. "His mobilization was obviously related to that issue," said Boris Dežulović who was deputy editor at the time. "We believe they planned to send him to the front lines in Bosnia, but after all the noise this case has raised, they have left him in the barracks instead." He was eventually released. International media took notice of the cover, and a framed copy was even put up in the New York Times newsroom.

Although the magazine was humorous in nature, it started addressing more serious issues as the Yugoslav wars ensued. Feral was among the first Croatian newspapers to openly report on various topics that the state-controlled newspapers would not report on including war crimes perpetrated by Croatian soldiers, the Croatian army's involvement in the war in Bosnia, Tuđman's revanchist opinions of the Ustaše in the context of generic Croatian nationalism, the Herzegovina profiteer lobby, connections between the government and the Catholic Church and other topics. It denounced Croatian racism, Antisemitism, corruption from the governing party as well as Croatian war crimes. HDZ officials criticised Feral, accusing it of anti-Croatian reporting at a time when the country was at war. In 1994, a 50% sales tax typically imposed on pornographic magazines was imposed on the Feral by the HDZ government. This tax received criticism and in 1995 the Croatian Constitutional Court overturned the decision.

Due to the change in the political system, there was nationwide confusion on many issues at the time. "Financial engineering", corruption, and the renewed independence resulted in changes in the government, a burst of patriotism, nationalism, and xenophobia. As a political satire paper, the Feral Tribune provided significant material from the warmongering and profiteering associated with the era. Feral arguably represented almost the only influential opposition to the HDZ administration on the media scene.

In 1996, HDZ passed a law under which public criticism of the highest officials was punishable. The editors of Feral editors were among the first to be sued for defamation. Feral was the subject of dozens of libel suits and criminal charges laid by government officials, including by Tudjman's daughter. In 1998, they were sued by the government for an article criticizing Tudjman's plan to move the remains of Ustaše soldiers and bury them alongside World War Two concentration camp victims at Jasenovac.

In 1997, Feral published an interview with Miroslav Bajramovic, a former member of the reservist police battalion under the command of Tomislav Merčep, who detailed war crimes committed against Serb civilians in Pakračka Poljana. After it ran the story, Feral staff members had to be given police protection because of the death threats it received.

Despite these issues, Feral Tribune continued to survive in part because of donations from abroad. Tudjman died in 1999 and his party was voted out of power on 2000 parliamentary elections.

Attempts to replace Tudjman with George W. Bush as a target led to the magazine embracing a stronger ideological profile and promoting radical left views which alienated some of its old readers and allowed other Croatian newsweeklies, most notably Globus and Nacional, to rise in their relative popularity. Feral was also affected by personnel changes with the departure of one of its founders.

While the magazine's circulation and influence were limited by these factors, the Feral Tribune continued to maintain a strong critical approach to the government. It criticised Prime Minister Ivica Račan for his unwillingness to distance himself from Tuđman's legacy and exposed corruption scandals related to his government. In 2003, after HDZ's return to power, Feral Tribune began to see a resurgence in popularity. In December 2005, Drago Hedl, the paper's editor, received an anonymous death threat by mail, for his reporting on the abduction and murder of ethnic Serb civilians in Osijek in 1991-92. In 2006, the International Center for Journalists is awarding Hedl a Knight International Award for excellence in journalism.

== Financial troubles and closure ==
In June 2007, the paper missed two weekly issues due to financial problems. The editorial staff announced that their bank accounts had been blocked due to a VAT debt, and that several court rulings against the paper had imposed additional strain on their accounts. The staff accused the Croatian government of favoring governmental and nationalist media by writing off their VAT debts, thus creating an unfair competition to Feral. The finance ministry's decision to freeze the weekly's bank accounts was widely condemned in Croatia. Croatian officials, including the President Stjepan Mesić and the Prime Minister Ivo Sanader both pledged help to Feral Tribune, both acclaiming it as a contributor to the development of democracy in Croatia, but no help was actually offered.

On 28 June 2007, the paper began publication again. It was reported that, due to financial difficulties, it was to be bought by Europa Press Holding (EPH), the largest publisher in Croatia (Globus, Jutarnji list), sparking speculation regarding the future of Feral's independence. However, in June 2008, after the EPH started avoiding the paper's officials in takeover negotiations, Feral Tribune editors announced the end of the magazine. After 15 years, and numerous lawsuits from politicians, editors cited financial troubles due to lack of funding and the failure of negotiations with EPH as the causes.

== Awards ==
Feral had won several important awards over the years:

- In 1992 it received Veselko Tenžera's award and the Stefanel award.
- In 1996 it won International Press Directory's award for freedom of the press.
- In 1997 it won the World Association of Newspapers' Golden Pen of Freedom, and an International Press Freedom Award from the Committee to Protect Journalists.
- In 1998 it received an award for the best political satire newspaper in the world, at the International fair of political satire in Forte dei Marmi.

== See also ==
- Boris Dežulović
- Viktor Ivančić
- Nedjeljna Dalmacija
