= Arsen Dedić =

Croatian singer-songwriter (1938–2015)

- Dedić in 2006
- Born: Arsenije Dedić; 28 July 1938; Šibenik, Kingdom of Yugoslavia (modern Croatia)
- Died: 17 August 2015 (aged 77); Zagreb, Croatia
- Resting place: Mirogoj Cemetery, Zagreb, Croatia
- Other names: Igor Krimov; Luka Juras
- Education: Academy of Music, University of Zagreb
- Occupations: Composer; poet; flutist; songwriter; arranger; orchestra conductor; music producer
- Years active: 1958–2015
- Spouses: Vesna Suligoj (m. 1961; div. 1965); Gabi Novak (m. 1973)
- Children: 2, including Matija
- Awards: Order of Danica Hrvatska
- Musical career
- Genres: Chanson; pop
- Instruments: Vocals; piano; guitar; flute
- Labels: Jugoton; ZKP RTLJ; PGP-RTB; Diskoton; HRT Orfej; Cantus Records; Croatia Records; Dallas Records
- Website: arsen.hr

Arsenije "Arsen" Dedić (pronounced [ǎrsɛːnijɛ ǎrsen děːditɕ]; 28 July 1938 – 17 August 2015) was a Yugoslav and Croatian singer-songwriter. He wrote and performed chansons, as well as film music. He was also an award-winning poet, and was one of the best-selling poets of former Yugoslavia and Croatia.

== Biography ==
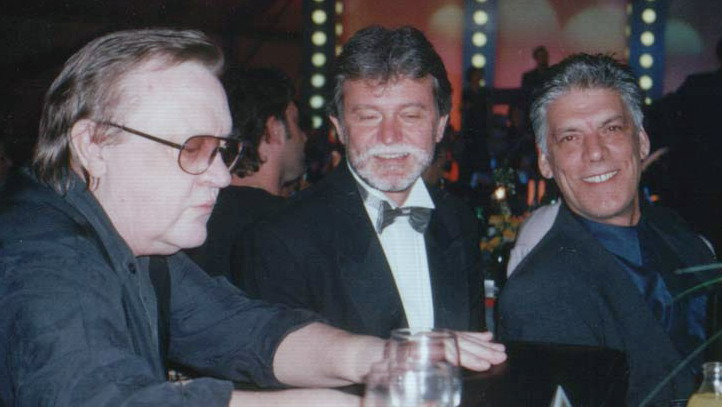
Dedić (left) with Croatia Records (formerly Jugoton) executives Veljko Despot and Siniša Škarica in Makarska, 1999.

Dedić was born in Šibenik, in the Littoral Banovina of the Kingdom of Yugoslavia, today Šibenik-Knin County, in the region of Dalmatia, within the Republic of Croatia, as the second child of Veronika "Jelka" (née Mišković) and Jovan Dedić. His father was an Orthodox Christian ethnic Serb, while his mother was a Croat who converted from Catholicism to Serb Orthodoxy after marrying Jovan. His father was a bricklayer, volunteer firefighter and musician, while his mother was an illiterate housewife, whom Dedić later taught to write and read.

Dedić was baptized in the Serbian Orthodox Church under the name Arsenije, after the Serbian Archbishop Arsenije III Čarnojević. He finished music school. He and his older brother Milutin left Šibenik for Zagreb and Belgrade, respectively, in 1957. He studied law at the University of Zagreb but dropped out in 1959, enrolling in the Music Academy of Zagreb and receiving a diploma in 1964.

Dedić became a household name in the 1960s, thanks to pop music festivals and his brand of music, which was at first influenced by Dalmatian folklore, but is mostly comparable to the French chanson genre. Throughout the decades Dedić became one of the most respected musicians in former Yugoslavia and maintained that reputation all the way to his death.

== Illness and death ==
At the beginning of 2014, Dedić fell and had difficulties walking, so he had to use a cane. Because of unbearable pain in July 2015, he underwent surgery for hip endoprosthesis in the orthopedic hospital in Krapinske Toplice, followed by a two-week rehabilitation. On 28 July, he spent his 77th birthday with family and friends in Zagreb. At the end of July, he suffered severe inflammation most likely as a complication after the surgery, because of which he had the liver transplant in 2004 and had been under immunosuppressive therapy since then, and was taken to intensive care. At first, his condition improved and the medical records were better.

On 8 August, it was reported that his inflammation had calmed down and responded well to drugs. He was expected to be released home but his wife Gabi Novak found him in a serious condition lying on the floor next to the walker and speaking indistinctly. He was admitted on the emergency neurology of the Zagreb Clinical Hospital Center but on 13 August, his condition drastically worsened. On 14 August, his lungs failed and he was attached to the respirator, and soon the other organs failed successively. Novak refused a high-risk surgery.

Dedić died at the Zagreb Clinical Hospital Center on 17 August 2015, at 9:00 pm, aged 77. The commemoration was held at the Croatian National Theatre in Šibenik, and in the Croatian Music Institute in Zagreb. He was cremated and buried, according to his own wishes, in the circle of his closest family, far from the public eyes, on 25 August at the Mirogoj Cemetery in Zagreb.

== Personal life ==
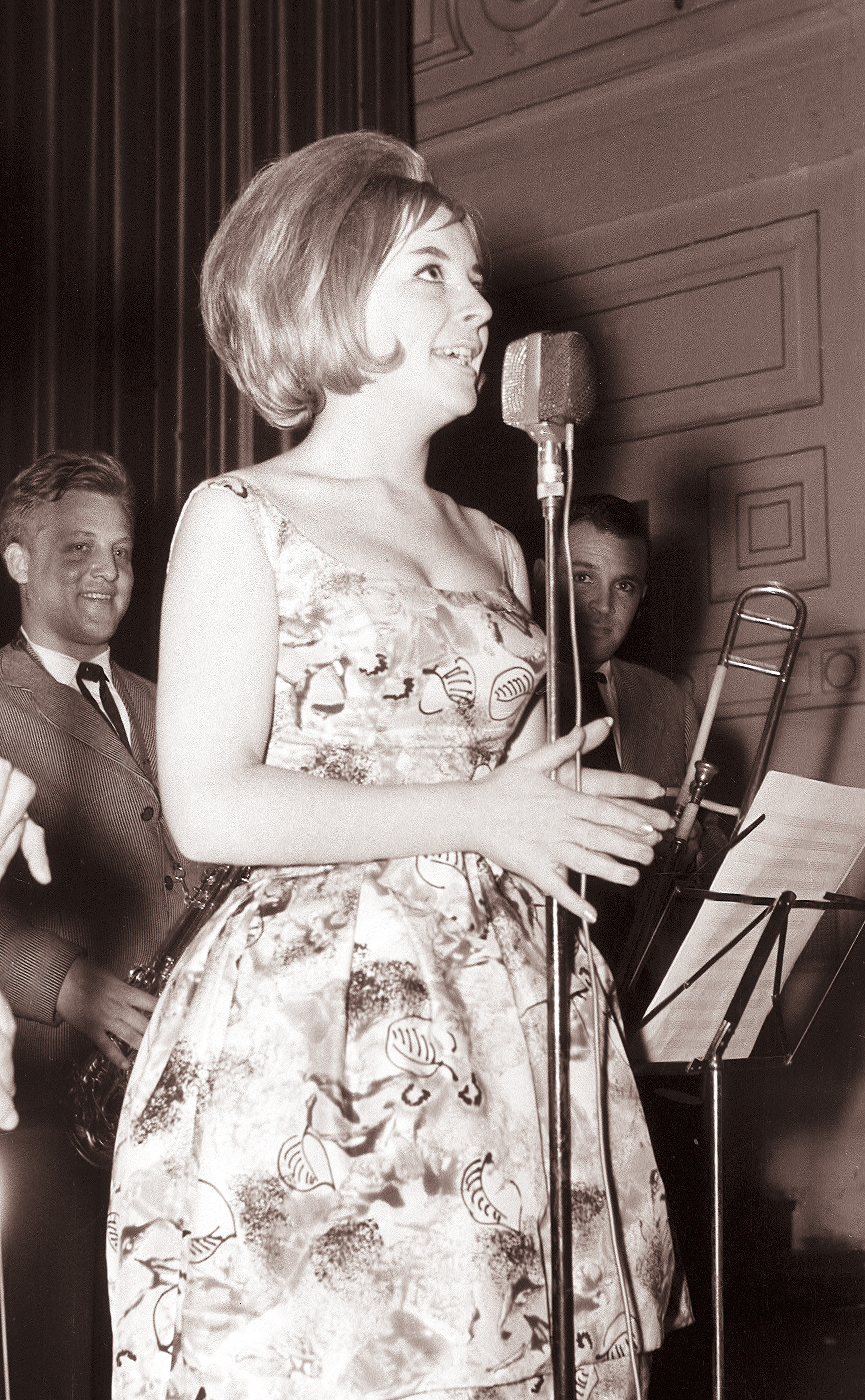
Gabi Novak

Arsen Dedić and his wife Gabi Novak got married on 30 March 1973. They had together a son Matija, a renowned jazz pianist.

Dedić had a daughter Sandra, born in 1962, from his first marriage with Vesna Suligoj, a grandniece of Antun Gustav Matoš, one of the greatest Croatian poets. Sandra is married to Alen Slavica, a popular singer-songwriter and they have daughter Ema, born in August 2011. In 1973, Dedić married his second wife Gabi Novak, a prominent Croatian pop singer. Their son Matija, who was born the same year and died in 2025, was one of the most respected jazz pianists in Croatia. Matija had a daughter Lu, with his wife Marina Scotti.

Dedić dedicated several songs to his wife Gabi Novak, as well as to his daughter ("Sandra") and granddaughters ("Pjesma za Lu", "Mata Hari"). Daughter Sandra appears as a girl on the cover of the 1987 album Kino Sloboda.

Dedić defined himself not as "apolitical, but anti-political". He rejected the possibility of political engagement or support for a politician, convinced that singers do not need declarative statements. Affected by bans and censorship in various parts of his career, he often highlighted John Stuart Mill's liberal motto as his life motto, according to which an individual's freedom reaches all the way to someone else's freedom. Declaring himself an artist of "leftist belief", he opposed collectivism and nationalism. During the 1997 Croatian presidential election campaign, his name appeared on a list of several hundred cultural workers and artists who openly supported Franjo Tuđman's candidacy in an open letter, without his approval or request, to which he requested and printed a denial. After the democratic changes of the 1990s, he cited the solidarity of the system and social mobility as positive aspects of the former socialism.

He was a member of the Zagreb Society of Friends of the Hajduk Split football club, which he regularly supported with his presence and pro bono performances at Bila noć (White Night). Back in 1967, he included his compositions "Čovjek od soli" (Man of Salt), and a duet with Vice Vukov "I da bi ja ruku u vatru stavit" (And to Put My Hand In the Fire) on the EP Naprid bili, the proceeds from the sale of which were collected for the construction of the new Hajduk stadium.

== Discography ==
=== Albums released on vinyl ===
- " 45 rpm compact vinyl – "ZAGREB 66" XII Festival Zabavne Muzike. SANDRA – Pjeva Arsen Dedic.
- Čovjek kao ja (1969)
- Arsen 2 (1971)
- Homo Volans (double album) (1973)
- Vraćam se (1975)
- Porodično stablo (1976)
- Arsenal (1976)
- Otisak autora (1976)
- Pjesme sa šlagom (1976)
- Dedić-Golob (1977)
- Kuća pored mora (instrumentals) (1978)
- Rimska ploča (1980)
- Pjevam pjesnike (1980)
- Naručene pjesme (1980)
- Gabi i Arsen (1980)
- Carevo novo ruho (1981)
- Arsen pjeva djeci (1982)
- Provincija (1984)
- Kantautor (double album) (1985)
- Moje popevke (1986)
- Kino Sloboda (1987)
- Arsen & Bora Čorba Unplugged `87 (1987)
- Hrabri ljudi (Gabi i Arsen) (1988)
- Glazba za film i TV (1989)
- Svjedoci priče (1989)

=== Albums released on CD ===
- Najbolje od Arsena (1991)
- Tihi obrt (1993)
- Der Gesang der Narren von Europa (1995 – with Dževad Karahasan and Herbert Gantschacher)
- Ko ovo more platit (1995)
- Ministarstvo (1997) / Ministarstvo straha (2000, 2005)
- Herbar (1999)
- Čovjek kao ja (1969, 1999)
- Kino Sloboda (1987, 2000)
- Kinoteka (2002)
- Homo volans (1973, 2003)
- Imena žena (2003)
- Na zlu putu (2004)
- Ministarstvo straha (2006)
- Rebus (2008)

== Poetry ==
- Brod u Boci (Croatia Concert, Zagreb, 1971)
- Hotel Balkan (Znanje, Zagreb, 1987)
- 101 Pjesma (Svjetlost, Sarajevo, 1989)

== Bibliography ==
- Lopušina, Marko (16 October 2008). "Arsen Dedić: Beograd me stvorio". Večernje novosti (in Serbian).
- Fuka, Ivor; Kegelj, Ivan (19 January 2015). "RAZGOVOR S ARSENOM DEDIĆEM: Pomalo privodim svoju priču kraju!". Lupiga (in Croatian).
