= Gabi Novak =

Croatian singer (1936–2025)

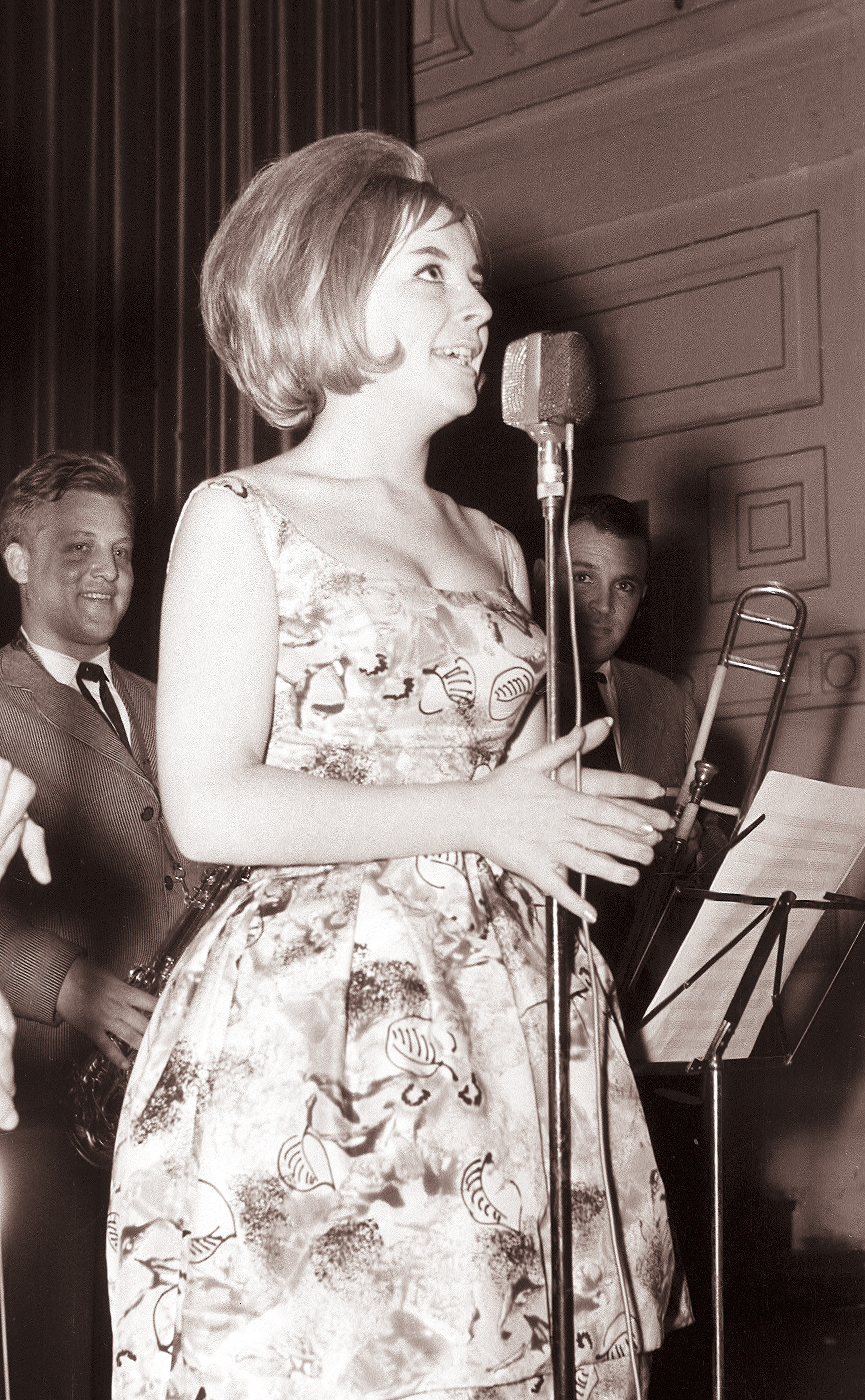
- Novak performing in 1961
- Born: Gabrijela Novak; 8 July 1936; Berlin, German Reich
- Died: 11 August 2025 (aged 89); Zagreb, Croatia
- Resting place: Mirogoj Cemetery, Zagreb, Croatia
- Occupation: Singer
- Years active: 1959–2025
- Spouses: Stipica Kalogjera (div. 1970); Arsen Dedić (m. 1973; died 2015)
- Children: Matija Dedić
- Musical career
- Genres: Pop; jazz
- Instrument: Vocals

Gabrijela Novak (pronounced [ɡâbi nôʋaːk]; 8 July 1936 – 11 August 2025) was a Croatian pop and jazz singer. A wife of the prominent Yugoslav singer-songwriter Arsen Dedić, whom she married in 1973, Novak became popular in the 1960s.

== Life and career ==
Born in Berlin to a family of father Đuro Novak, a Croat from Hvar, and mother Elizabeth Reiman, a German from Berlin, Gabi Novak spent her childhood in her hometown but later she moved to Yugoslavia. Her father was killed in 1945.

Novak was married to the prominent composer Stipica Kalogjera but in 1970, they got divorced. On 30 March 1973, she married Arsen Dedić, a renowned singer-songwriter who also composed many of her songs. The couple had one son Matija, who died on 8 June 2025. Matija's funeral was Novak's last public appearance before her death two months later, on 11 August, at the age of 89. She died at a nursing home, shortly after recovering from pneumonia.

== Discography ==
=== Studio albums ===
- Peva Gaby Novak (1961)
- Gabi (1970)
- Samo žena (1974)
- Gabi 77. (1977)
- Gabi & Arsen (with Arsen Dedić; 1980)
- Gabi Novak (1982)
- Nada (1985)
- Pjesma je moj život (2002)

=== Live albums ===
- Jazzarella ZKM 2009 (2009)

=== Compilation albums ===
- Gabi (1973)
- Najveći uspjesi (1978)
- Hrabri ljudi (30 godina na sceni) (with Arsen Dedić; 1988)
- Retrospektiva (1993)
- Adrese moje mladosti (1997)
- Zlatna kolekcija (2006)
- Najljepše ljubavne pjesme (2012)
- The Best Of Collection (2016)
- 25 Greatest Hits (2024)

=== Box sets ===
- Diskobiografija Vol. 1 (2020)
- Diskobiografija Vol. 2 (2021)

== Awards ==
Gabi Novak was the winner of several Porin awards:

- Best Jazz Performance (2002)
- Album of the Year (2003)
- Best Female Vocal Performance (2003)
- Best Pop Album (2003)
- Best Vocal Collaboration (2003)
- Lifetime Achievement Award (2006).
