= Tomislav Merčep =

Croatian soldier and politician (1952–2020)

President of the Croatian Popular Party
- In office 28 December 1997 – 6 December 2016
- Preceded by: Office established
- Succeeded by: Office abolished

Member of the Croatian Parliament
- In office 22 March 1993 – 12 May 1997

Personal details
- Born: 28 September 1952 Vukovar, SR Croatia, SFR Yugoslavia (modern Croatia)
- Died: 16 November 2020 (aged 68) Zagreb, Croatia
- Party: Croatian Democratic Union (1990–1997); Croatian Popular Party (1997–2016)
- Occupation: Politician; Officer

Military service
- Allegiance: Croatia
- Years of service: 1991–1995
- Battles/wars: Croatian War of Independence

Tomislav Merčep (28 September 1952 – 16 November 2020) was a Croatian politician and paramilitary leader during the Croatian War of Independence who was later convicted of war crimes.

== Early life and the Croatian War of Independence ==
A native of Vukovar, Merčep worked as an engineer before joining the Croatian Democratic Union (HDZ) in 1990. He then entered the local city government as the Secretary of People's Defense (Croatian: Sekretar narodne obrane), where he exerted considerable power in the local police and business, esp. in preparation for the impending war. During the war, he engaged in paramilitary activities which were subsequently investigated by the Hague tribunal and covered by the (now defunct) Croatian newspaper Feral Tribune.

In the spring and summer of 1991, units under his leadership terrorized ethnic Serbs living in Vukovar; homes and cafes were blown up, many were executed or disappeared. In 1997 the Feral Tribune released a document which confirmed exchanges of large quantities of explosive materials in September 1990 between Merčep and Branimir Glavaš. In August 1991, Merčep was briefly arrested by Croatian authorities and detained on undisclosed charges, but was soon released and moved to Zagreb together with his family, prior to the start of the Croatian War of Independence.

Merčep later became an officer in the Croatian Ministry of Internal Affairs and he participated in the other fronts of the war, being in command of thousands of paramilitaries which were responsible for killing and expelling thousands of ethnic Serbs from areas in and around Gospić, among other places (notably the Murder of the Zec family in Zagreb). The "Merčepovci" unit also detained, tortured and killed several dozen Serb civilians at the Zagreb Trade Fair, Kutina in central Croatia and Pakračka Poljana in western Slavonia in late 1991. A total of 46 civilians were killed by the Merčepovci, three went missing and have not been found, and six were tortured but survived. A decade later, five members of his unit, Munib Suljić, Igor Mikola, Siniša Rimac, Miro Bajramović and Branko Šarić, were indicted on several criminal charges related to the Pakračka Poljana case, involving the killing of prisoners, mostly ethnic Serbs, in a field near Pakrac, and later convicted. Tomislav Merčep himself was not indicted in these proceedings.

== Political career ==
Merčep became a HDZ member of the Chamber of Counties of Croatian Parliament in 1993.

In 1995, he became the leader of the "Association of Croatian Volunteer Veterans of the Patriotic War" (Croatian: Udruga hrvatskih dragovoljaca Domovinskog rata, UHDDR). As of March 2016 he remained at the head of that association.

In 1997, he quit the HDZ and instead founded his own party, the Croatian Popular Party (Hrvatska pučka stranka, HPS). In 2000 he ran as a HPS candidate in 2000 presidential elections, where he received 0.85% of the vote and was eliminated in the first round.

== War crimes prosecution ==
In 2003, the Croatian weekly Nacional reported that the ICTY was "completing an indictment against Tomislav Merčep", after interviewing Franjo Gregurić, Mladen Markač, Hrvoje Šarinić and others. There were media reports in 2006 that an indictment against Merčep himself, based on ICTY investigations, was forthcoming in the Croatian legal system. In December 2010, Amnesty International recommended that Merčep should be prosecuted based on a series of public testimonies about crimes committed by his subordinates. The same week, the County Prosecutor in Zagreb brought up charges against Merčep and he was arrested.

In May 2016, Merčep was sentenced to five-and-a-half years' imprisonment for failing to prevent the murder of 43 Serb civilians in Pakračka Poljana and other locations, committed by members of the unit under his command. In February 2017, upon appeal by the State Attorney's Office, the Supreme Court of Croatia increased his prison term to 7 years.

== Death ==
Merčep was conditionally released from prison in March 2020 due to a serious illness, and died on 16 November 2020.
