= Drago Hedl =

Croatian journalist (born 1950)

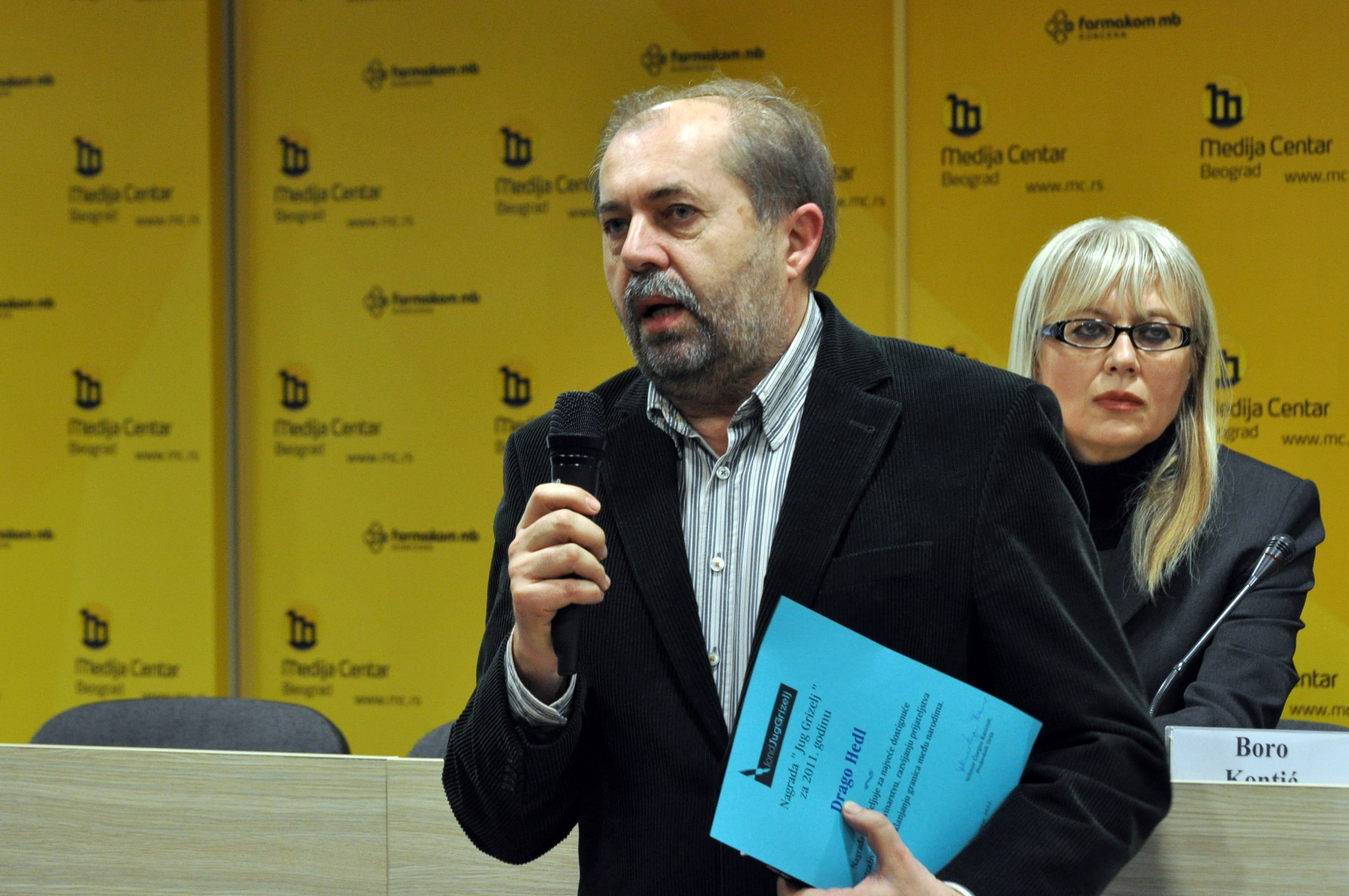
- Born: Dragutin Hedl; 24 January 1950 (age 76); Osijek, Yugoslavia
- Education: University of Osijek
- Occupation: Investigative journalist
- Years active: 1976-present
- Known for: Writing on war crimes during the Croatian War of Independence
- Children: Matija Hedl

Drago Hedl (born 24 January 1950) is a Croatian investigative journalist.

== Biography ==
Drago Hedl was born in Osijek and became a professional journalist in 1976. He was the editor of the literary magazine Revija (1976–1981), then worked as a journalist and editor before becoming editor-in-chief of the daily newspaper Glas Slavonije in 1985, a position he was forced to leave in July 1991. From 1991 to 1994, he was a war correspondent for Slobodna Dalmacija, a Split-based daily, from 1991 to 1994. Following that, he joined IWPR's London-based War Report and then spent several years leading training programs for young journalists throughout the Balkan region. Hedl later wrote for Feral Tribune, and Novi list. He was a long-time collaborator of Radio Free Europe. His articles were published by many newspapers and magazines, among them The Guardian, The Times and Die Wochenzeitung (Zurich). From 2008 to 2015, he worked as an investigative journalist for the daily newspaper Jutarnji list. Since 2015, he has worked as an investigative journalist for Telegram.

== Awards ==
"Drago Hedl has endured death threats, government litigation, beatings by local politicians and army soldiers, among others, and verbal abuse for his reporting of war crimes in Yugoslavia in the 1990s. His struggle against ultra-nationalism, wartime propaganda and hate speech, and for tolerance and the rule of law, has led to accusations of treason. His support for complying with demands to send indicted war criminals to the International Criminal Tribunal for the former Yugoslavia in The Hague has further provoked his opponents. Nothing, however, has deterred him from solid and objective coverage of a sensitive topic in his homeland."

Hedl is best known for his investigative work for Feral Tribune and from 2008 for Jutarnji list in uncovering war crimes during the Croatian War of Independence.

His awards and recognition include the following:

- In 2006 Knight International Journalism Award from the International Center for Journalists,
- In 2008 the CEI-SEEMO Investigative Journalism Award by the Central European Initiative
- In 2011 Dr. Erhard Busek Award for Better Understanding in South East Europe from the South East Europe Media Organisation. He was also the recipient of the Order of Stjepan Radić in 2011 for his "contribution to the fight for human rights, the promotion of democracy and the discovery of truth"
- 2015 the Otokar Keršovani Prize from the Croatian Journalists' Association for Lifetime Achievement in Journalism.

== Works ==
=== Books ===
- Ratne reportaže (2003)
- Glavaš – kronika jedne destrukcije (2010)
- Donjodravska obala (2013)
- Šutnja trilogy: Izborna šutnja (2014), Ispovjedna tajna (2015), Kijevska piletina (2019)
- Vrijeme seksa u doba nevisnosti (2018)
- Matija (2024)

=== Screenplay ===
- Vukovar - posljednji rez (2006)
- Mirotvorac (2025)

His crime thriller Izborna Šutnja, set in Croatia and Ukraine, was adapted for television in 2021 as Šutnja and streamed in the U.S. on MHz Choice under the series title The Silence.

== Personal life ==
Hedl has been married for eight years to Ivana, a fellow journalist, and had one son, Matija. In 2018 his 44-year-old son Matija, a biochemist and researcher at Yale University in the United States, took his own life. In December of 2024, Hedl wrote a book dedicated to him "Matija".

He holds a bachelor's degree in Yugoslav literature from the University of Osijek.
