= Glas Slavonije =

Croatian daily newspaper

- Type: Daily newspaper
- Format: Berliner
- Owner: Media Solutions
- Publisher: Glas Slavonije d.d.
- Editor: Mario Mihaljević
- Founded: 24 June 1943
- Political alignment: Conservative
- Language: Croatian
- Headquarters: Hrvatske Republike 20
- City: Zvečevo (1943-1945); Osijek (since 1945)
- Country: Partisan Liberated Territory of Slavonia (1943-1945) Yugoslavia (1945-1991) Croatia (since 1991)
- ISSN: 0350-3968
- Website: www.glas-slavonije.hr

Glas Slavonije (lit. 'The Voice of Slavonia') is a Croatian conservative regional daily newspaper published in Osijek every day except Sundays and holidays. In 2000, its average daily circulation was c. 9000, making it the 7th largest daily newspaper in Croatia. Since October 2024 the price of the newspaper is 1,40 € per copy.

== History ==
The first issue of Glas Slavonije was published on 24 June 1943. During the war it was a leading anti-fascist newspaper in eastern Croatia and it represented a direct continuation of the earlier Slavonski partizan paper which was published from January 1942. At the time, Glas Slavonije had a print run of around 4,000 copies.

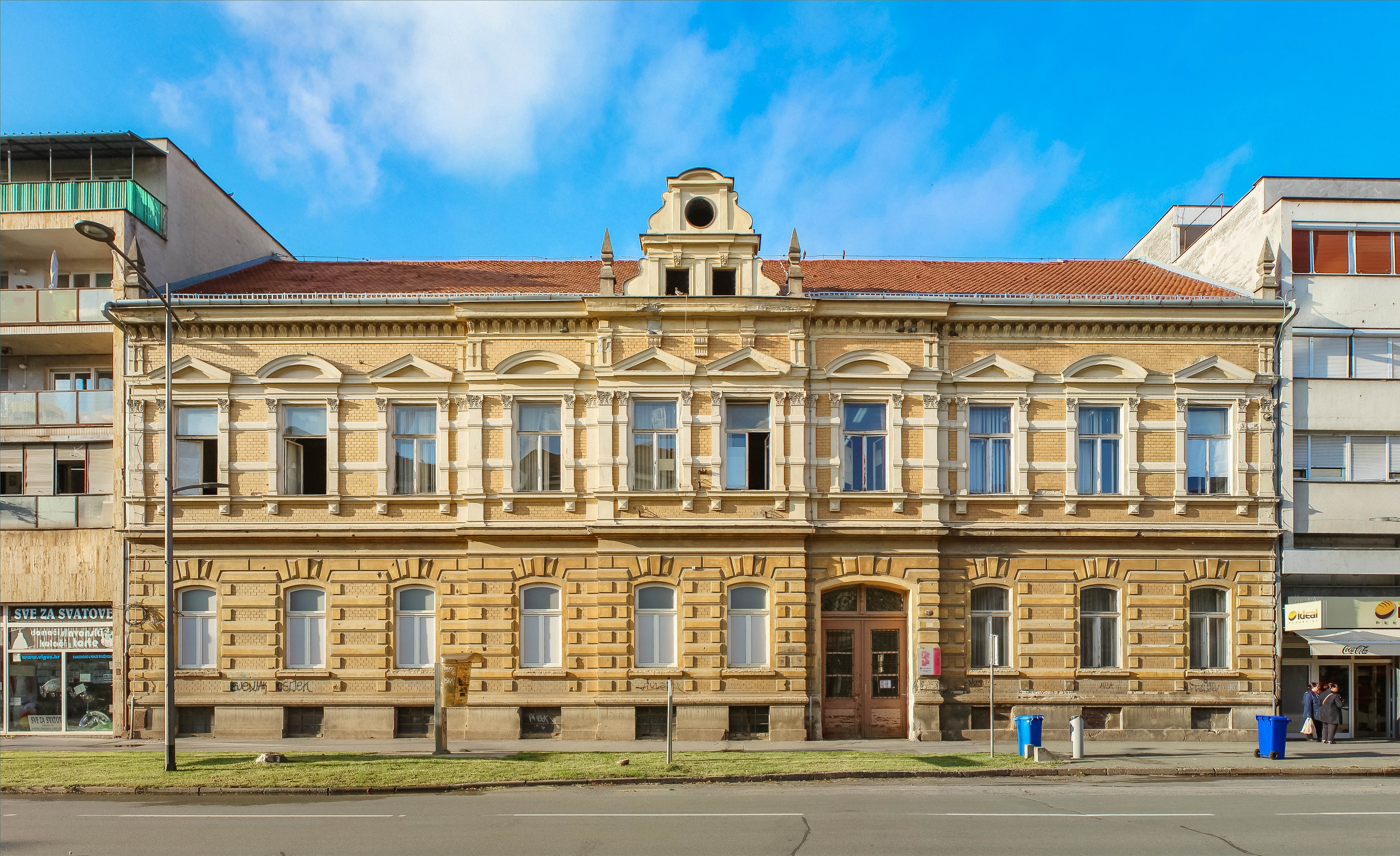
Glas Slavonije building in Osijek

Originally serving as the official publication of the United People's Liberation Front of Slavonia, the first issue was printed on Slavonian territories liberated by Yugoslav Partisans during the World War II in Yugoslavia. The newspaper was founded by members of the Communist Party of Croatia’s regional committee for Slavonia, Dušan Čalić and Zvonko Brkić. During World War II, it was printed in the Zvečevo area near Duzluk, close to Orahovica, and from spring 1945 onward in Osijek. From June 1943 to January 1945, its full title was Glas Slavonije, the organ of the United People's Liberation Front in Slavonia. In 1945, the title changed slightly to Glas Slavonije, the organ of the United People's Liberation Front for Slavonia, and in 1946 it became Glas Slavonije, the organ of the People's Front for Slavonia. Between 1955 and 1958, it was known as Glas Slavonije, the organ of the Socialist Alliance of Working People of Croatia for Slavonia and Baranja.

A distinctive feature of Glas Slavonije during the socialist period was its focus on agricultural and rural issues, involvement with peasant work cooperatives, and editorial support for state-imposed agricultural procurement plans. The paper lagged behind technologically and in ambitions compared to major Belgrade and federal newspapers like Večernje novosti and Politika, which at the time dominated the readership in Slavonia. Between 1973 and 1990, Glas Slavonije was the leading daily newspaper in Slavonia with a circulation of about 15,000. Its management completed full computerization of production, updated printing equipment and modernized editorial and business facilities. From 1986 to 1991, under editor Drago Hedl, the paper modernized with multi-color offset printing and computerized newsroom and business operations.

During the Croatian War of Independence, the paper's volume numbering was changed, and its imprint now states that Glas Slavonije is the successor to Hrvatski list, which began publishing in 1920. Glas Slavonije was influenced by intense political divisions in Osijek before and during the war, particularly the conflict between Branimir Glavaš and the more moderate factions of the ruling Croatian Democratic Union, which directly affected the newspaper's editorial policy. During the contentious privatisation of the newspaper in 1991 editor-in-chief Drago Hedl resigned. His departure, occurring in the midst of the paper's ownership transformation, was seen as the close of an era in the history of Glas Slavonije. He was succeeded by Josip Kelemen. In the summer of 1991, Branimir Glavaš forcefully took control of the Glas Slavonije editorial office after which the publication adopted an extreme Croatian nationalist discourse including hate speech. In 1993, the daily became part of the Glas Slavonije Media Center, which was renamed Media Solutions in 2016.

== Editors ==
- Vladimir Ginter (1978–1986)
- Drago Hedl (1986–1991)
- Josip Kelemen (1991–1991)
- Dario Topić (1992–1993; 1995–1998; 2000)
- Vladimir Vazdar (1993–1995)
- Sanja Marketić (1998–1999)
- Bojan Divjak (2000–2005; 2016–2024)
- Zoran Jaćimović (2005–2010)
- Damir Gregorović (2010–2012)
- Mario Mihaljević (2012–2016; since 2024)
