= 2000 Croatian presidential election =

← 1997	24 January 2000 (first round); 7 February 2000 (second round)	2005 →
- Turnout: 62.98% (first round); 60.88% (second round)
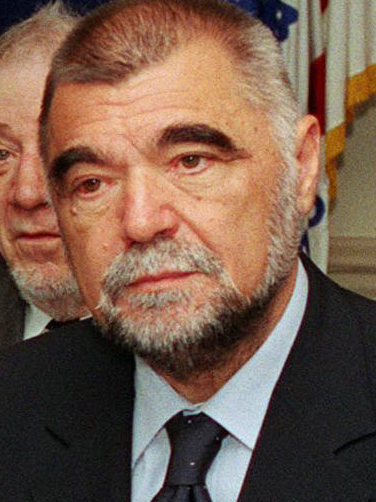

Nominee	Stjepan Mesić	Dražen Budiša
Party	HNS	HSLS
Popular vote	1,433,372	1,125,969
Percentage	56.01%	43.99%
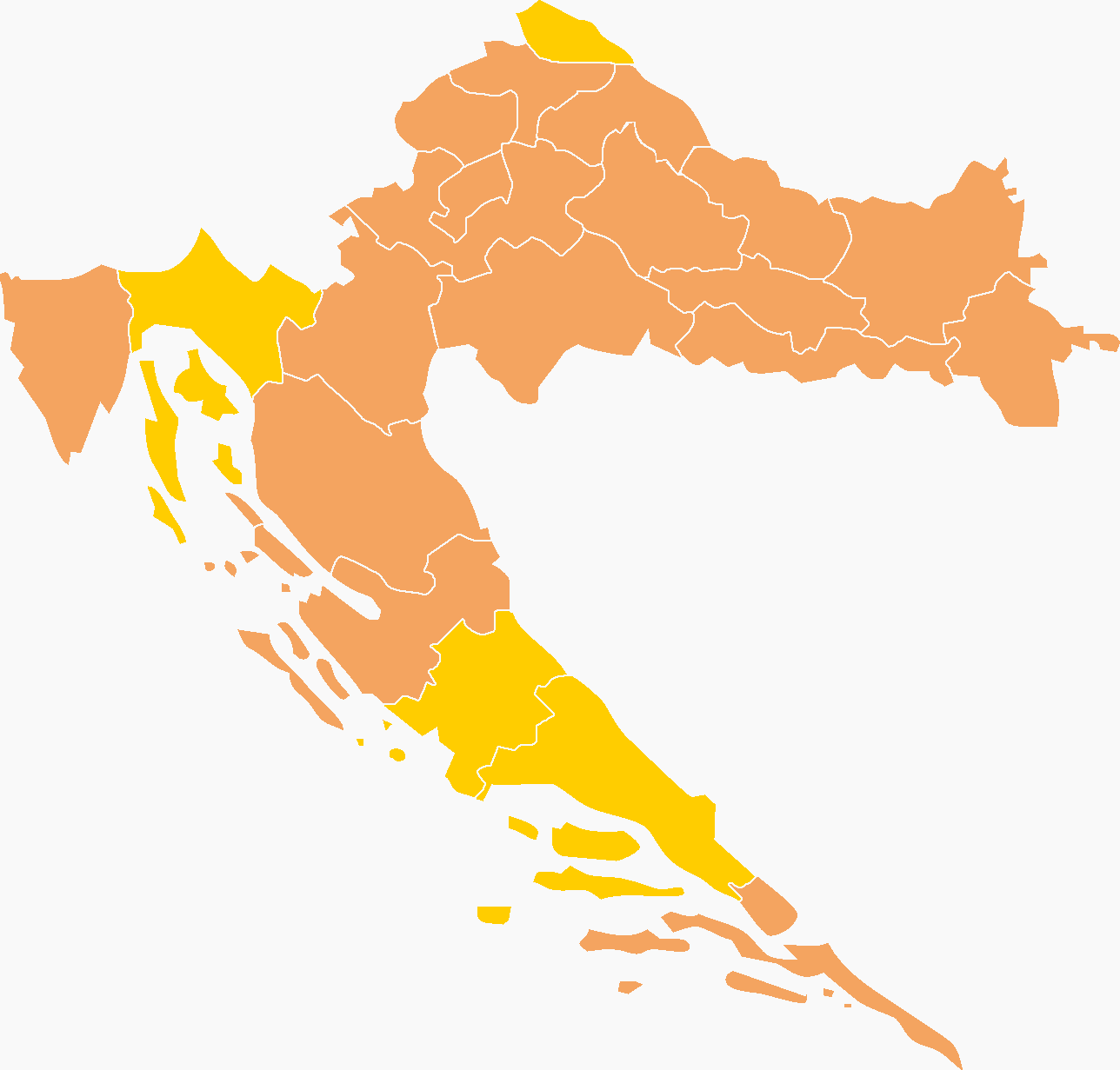
- Second round results by county Stjepan Mesić Dražen Budiša
President before election
Zlatko Tomčić (Acting)
HSS
Elected President
Stjepan Mesić
HNS

Presidential elections were held in Croatia in January 2000, the third since independence in 1991. They were also the first early presidential elections, as they were held due to the death of incumbent president Franjo Tuđman on 10 December 1999, as well as being the last elections held under the semi-presidential system of government, by which the President was the most powerful official in the government structure and could appoint and dismiss the Prime Minister and their cabinet.

As no candidate received the required majority (50%+1 vote of the valid votes cast) in the first round on 24 January, a second round was held on 7 February, the first time a second round had been required in the country's history. The result was a victory for Stjepan Mesić of the Croatian People's Party, who received 56% of the vote. Voter turnout was 63% in the first round and 61% in the second round.

Mesić was inaugurated for a five-year term as the second president of Croatia on 18 February 2000 at St Mark's Square in front of the justices of the Constitutional Court.

== Results ==
Candidate	Party	First round		Second round	
Candidate	Party	Votes	%	Votes	%
Stjepan Mesić	Croatian People's Party	1,100,671	41.31	1,433,372	56.01
Dražen Budiša	Croatian Social Liberal Party	741,837	27.84	1,125,969	43.99
Mate Granić	Croatian Democratic Union	601,588	22.58		
Slaven Letica	Independent	110,782	4.16		
Anto Đapić	Croatian Party of Rights	49,288	1.85		
Ante Ledić	Independent	22,875	0.86		
Tomislav Merčep	Croatian Popular Party	22,672	0.85		
Ante Prkačin	New Croatia	7,401	0.28		
Zvonimir Šeparović	Independent	7,235	0.27		
Total		2,664,349	100.00	2,559,341	100.00
Valid votes		2,664,349	99.51	2,559,341	98.85
Invalid/blank votes		13,212	0.49	29,779	1.15
Total votes		2,677,561	100.00	2,589,120	100.00
Registered voters/turnout		4,251,109	62.98	4,252,921	60.88
Source: Croatian State Election Committee

=== First round results by county ===
County	Electorate	Total votes	Turnout	Mesić		Budiša		Granić		Letica		Đapić		Ledić		Merčep		Prkačin		Šeparović	
County	Electorate	Total votes	Turnout	Votes	%	Votes	%	Votes	%	Votes	%	Votes	%	Votes	%	Votes	%	Votes	%	Votes	%
Bjelovar-Bilogora	115,464	81,756	70.81%	34,936	42.73%	23,746	29.04%	17,109	20.93%	2,024	2.48%	1,767	2.16%	425	0.52%	917	1.12%	217	0.27%	139	0.17%
Brod-Posavina	145,948	98,066	67.19%	42,782	43.63%	20,477	20.88%	26,389	26.91%	3,228	3.29%	2,205	2.25%	564	0.58%	1,265	1.29%	339	0.35%	228	0.23%
Dubrovnik-Neretva	106,738	71,714	67.19%	24,328	33.92%	19,437	27.10%	20,483	28.56%	3,988	5.56%	1,279	1.78%	663	0.92%	444	0.62%	227	0.32%	509	0.71%
Istria	181,971	129,491	71.16%	79,834	61.65%	30,016	23.18%	11,531	8.90%	5,001	3.86%	876	0.68%	640	0.49%	547	0.42%	249	0.19%	170	0.13%
Karlovac	133,419	86,521	64.85%	32,773	37.88%	22,201	25.66%	22,945	26.52%	3,282	3.79%	2,958	3.42%	522	0.60%	804	0.93%	256	0.30%	188	0.22%
Koprivnica-Križevci	104,394	76,386	73.17%	33,788	44.23%	23,571	30.86%	14,510	19.00%	1,975	2.59%	1,000	1.31%	360	0.47%	558	0.73%	178	0.23%	117	0.15%
Krapina-Zagorje	116,767	83,329	71.36%	44,343	53.21%	18,821	22.59%	15,373	18.45%	2,110	2.53%	655	0.79%	448	0.54%	698	0.84%	148	0.18%	175	0.21%
Lika-Senj	54,777	29,085	53.10%	11,711	40.26%	5,451	18.74%	9,170	31.53%	608	2.09%	1,222	4.20%	131	0.45%	469	1.61%	74	0.25%	49	0.17%
Međimurje	96,453	67,721	70.21%	26,808	39.59%	26,881	39.69%	10,002	14.77%	2,142	3.16%	468	0.69%	394	0.58%	336	0.50%	160	0.24%	152	0.22%
Osijek-Baranja	286,877	190,343	66.35%	84,912	44.61%	52,913	27.80%	37,152	19.52%	6,256	3.29%	4,253	2.23%	1,013	0.53%	1,854	0.97%	475	0.25%	506	0.27%
Požega-Slavonia	72,114	50,351	69.82%	24,414	48.49%	10,138	20.13%	11,659	23.16%	1,345	2.67%	996	1.98%	335	0.67%	938	1.86%	128	0.25%	110	0.22%
Primorje-Gorski Kotar	276,501	191,448	69.24%	76,281	39.84%	69,254	36.17%	29,467	15.39%	9,863	5.15%	2,537	1.33%	1,261	0.66%	1,092	0.57%	505	0.26%	428	0.22%
Sisak-Moslavina	166,038	103,513	62.34%	38,668	37.36%	27,380	26.45%	26,511	25.61%	3,241	3.13%	4,581	4.43%	594	0.57%	1,366	1.32%	321	0.31%	193	0.19%
Split-Dalmatia	382,290	254,740	66.64%	70,132	27.53%	79,078	31.04%	77,352	30.37%	15,935	6.26%	3,613	1.42%	4,206	1.65%	1,727	0.68%	748	0.29%	643	0.25%
Šibenik-Knin	104,033	60,227	57.89%	15,798	26.23%	19,417	32.24%	18,492	30.70%	3,383	5.62%	1,744	2.90%	432	0.72%	321	0.53%	103	0.17%	165	0.27%
Varaždin	151,498	113,131	74.67%	49,701	43.93%	36,219	32.02%	20,119	17.78%	3,337	2.95%	1,387	1.23%	569	0.50%	727	0.64%	207	0.18%	286	0.25%
Virovitica-Podravina	80,463	56,416	70.11%	29,382	52.08%	13,067	23.16%	9,769	17.32%	1,327	2.35%	1,615	2.86%	222	0.39%	462	0.82%	100	0.18%	97	0.17%
Vukovar-Syrmia	191,096	99,698	52.17%	35,925	36.03%	28,678	28.76%	25,369	25.45%	2,994	3.00%	2,458	2.47%	699	0.70%	2,328	2.34%	245	0.25%	306	0.31%
Zadar	146,812	85,605	58.31%	30,464	35.59%	23,042	26.92%	21,951	25.64%	6,161	7.20%	1,508	1.76%	744	0.87%	760	0.89	318	0.37%	189	0.22%
Zagreb County	252,221	187,806	74.46%	93,956	50.03%	42,743	22.76%	36,930	19.66%	6,866	3.66%	2,538	1.35%	1,528	0.81%	1,559	0.83%	553	0.29%	345	0.18%
City of Zagreb	688,910	485,053	70.41%	210,778	43.45%	140,702	29.01%	88,457	18.24%	24,911	5.14%	5,954	1.23%	6,618	1.36%	3,039	0.63%	1,738	0.36%	1,370	0.28%
Voting abroad	396,325	75,161	18.96%	8,957	11.92%	8,605	11.45%	50,848	67.65%	805	1.07%	3,674	4.89%	507	0.67%	461	0.61%	120	0.16%	862	1.15%
TOTAL	4,251,109	2,677,561	62.98%	1,100,671	41.11%	741,837	27.71%	601,588	22.47%	110,782	4.14%	49,288	1.84%	22,875	0.85%	22,672	0.85%	7,401	0.28%	7,235	0.27%
Source: State Election Committee

=== Second round results by county ===
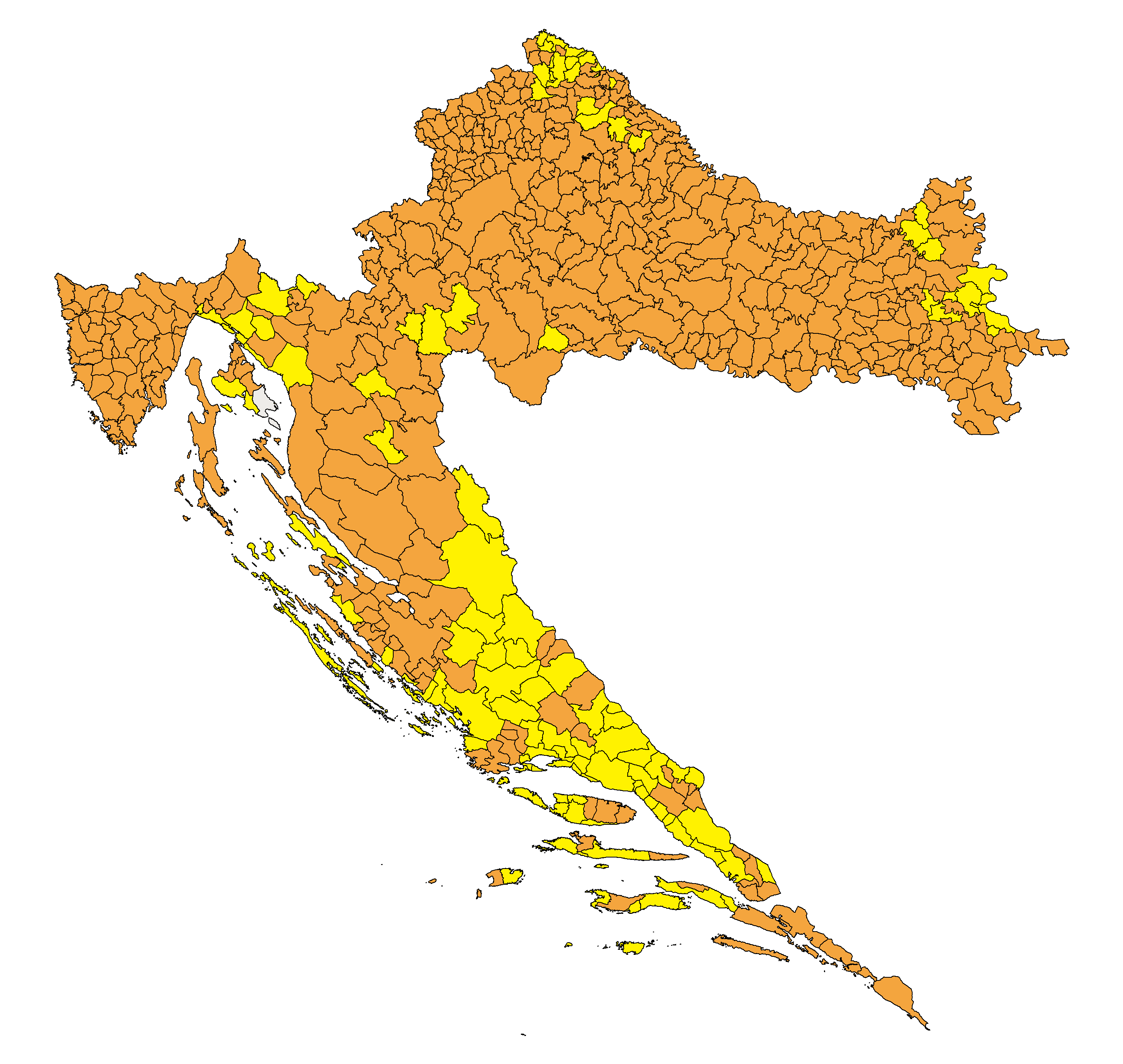
Results of the 2nd round of the election based on the majority of votes in each municipality of Croatia Stjepan Mesić Dražen Budiša Tie

County	Electorate	Total votes	Turnout	Mesić		Budiša	
County	Electorate	Total votes	Turnout	Votes	%	Votes	%
Bjelovar-Bilogora	115,553	80,032	69.26%	48,751	61.57%	30,428	38.43%
Brod-Posavina	145,955	95,504	65.43%	44,928	68.22%	29,995	31.78%
Dubrovnik-Neretva	106,752	66,978	62.74%	34,266	52.30%	31,250	47.70%
Istria	182,085	126,155	69.28%	88,802	70.89%	36,467	29.11%
Karlovac	133,358	83,555	62.65%	49,363	59.98%	32,936	40.02%
Koprivnica-Križevci	104,398	74,941	71.78%	44,458	59.78%	29,911	40.22%
Krapina-Zagorje	116,795	82,395	70.55%	57,454	70.38%	24,183	29.62%
Lika-Senj	55,341	29,329	53.00%	20,331	70.53%	8,496	29.47%
Međimurje	96,515	66,654	69.06%	30,824	46.64%	35,261	53.36%
Osijek-Baranja	287,153	185,695	64.67%	112,066	60.91%	71,919	39.09%
Požega-Slavonia	72,169	49,371	68.41%	34,942	71.52%	13,914	28.48%
Primorje-Gorski Kotar	276,665	183,521	66.33%	89,167	49.08%	92,498	50.92%
Sisak-Moslavina	166,086	101,236	60.95%	58,081	58.14%	41,811	41.86%
Split-Dalmatia	382,509	242,414	63.37%	98,572	41.50%	138,951	58.50%
Šibenik-Knin	104,088	58,284	55.99%	22,548	39.33%	34,788	60.67%
Varaždin	151,508	109,924	72.55%	61,860	56.75%	47,141	43.25%
Virovitica-Podravina	80,495	55,620	69.10%	39,067	70.93%	16,011	29.07%
Vukovar-Syrmia	191,168	96,979	50.73%	57,117	59.58%	38,755	40.42%
Zadar	146,765	80,400	54.78%	42,929	54.22%	36,253	45.78%
Zagreb County	252,433	182,413	72.26%	115,843	61.41%	64,887	35.90%
City of Zagreb	691,102	467,610	67.66%	246,811	53.31%	216,145	46.69%
Voting abroad	394,028	70,110	17.79%	15,723	22.56%	53,969	77.44%
TOTAL	4,252,921	2,589,120	60.88%	1,433,372	56.01%	1,125,969	43.99%
Source: State Election Committee
