= Tamara Obrovac =

Croatian singer, composer and songwriter

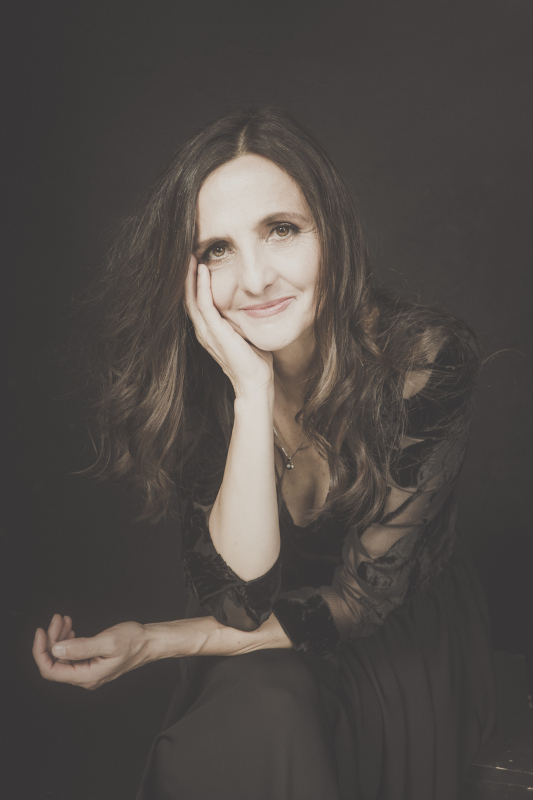
- Tamara Obrovac 2016, photo by M. Milin

Background information
- Born: April 1, 1962 (age 64); Pula, Croatia
- Genres: Jazz, world, funk soundtrack film score theatre music adult contemporary
- Occupation: Musician
- Instruments: Voice, flute
- Years active: 1983–present
- Labels: Cantus, Aquarius records, Unit records, Alessa records
- Website: www.tamaraobrovac.com/en/

Tamara Obrovac (born 1962 in Pula), Croatian singer, composer, songwriter and flutist is one of the most impressive artists on the Croatian music scene, her main expression is ethnically inspired contemporary jazz influenced by the particular musical and dialect traditions of her homeland, the Croatian peninsula of Istria.

== Biography ==
She started her musical career in Zagreb in the 1980s, when she discovered jazz, having graduated in flute performance at the music school in her native Pula. She began to perform in clubs in Croatia and Slovenia, and soon created her own distinctive musical expression, connecting the musical and dialectal tradition of her native Istria with jazz music, which brought her international recognition.

She has written around 200 compositions, published 13 CDs for which she composed all the music and wrote most of the lyrics. She writes lyrics in her local dialect and sings in other ancient and endangered Istrian dialects, of Slavic and Romance origin. Since her early career in the 1980s, she has formed and led several international bands (Transhistria ensemble, quartet, etc.) and held more than 500 international concerts. She was highly praised by both the audience and press. Her performances are marked by her charismatic stage energy, expressive voice and improvisational skills, as well as excellent performances by the bands.

In addition to her concert activities, she composes music for theater and film; she composed music for 10 movies, 40 theater plays and ballets, performed in most national and city theaters in Croatia and in the region. Unlike her main musical expression, in which she blends Istrian tradition and contemporary jazz, her stage and film music work is unlimited in genre.

She has received numerous awards for her work, among others: 9 Porin awards (Croatian national music award), she was the first woman who received the national award Golden Arena for the best film score (for Što je muškarac bez brkova at the Pula Film Festival), also, among many other nominations, she was nominated for the BBC Radio 3 World Music Award (European music and Audience award).

Her many international collaborations and projects include, among others: Glauco Venier, Theodosii Spassov, Vlatko Stefanovski, Kostas Theodoru, Karen Asatrian, Wolfgang Puschnig, Simone Zanchini, Elvis Stanić, Dario Marušić, Miroslav Tadić, Epoque string quartet, Vienna Radio String Quartet Vienna and enjoys long term collaborations (band members) with Fausto Beccalossi, Krunoslav Levačić, Uroš Rakovec, Žiga Golob, Matija Dedić and, recently, Salvatore Maiore and Stefano Battaglia.

== Discography ==
- 1996: "Triade" – Tamara Obrovac & trio (Croatian Composers Society)
- 1998: "Ulika" – Tamara Obrovac quartet (CBS)
- 2001: "Transhistria" – Tamara Obrovac Transhistria ensemble (Cantus)
- 2003: "Sve pasiva / All fades away" – Tamara Obrovac Transhistria ensemble (Cantus)
- 2005: "Daleko je…/ … is faraway" – Tamara Obrovac Transhistria ensemble Aquarius Records
- 2006: "Črni kos / Das Led der Amsel" – Tamara Obrovac & Georg Kustrich (Extraplatte)
- 2009: "Neću više jazz kantati / I Won’t Sing Jazz Anymore" – Tamara Obrovac Transhistria electric Aquarius Records
- 2011: "Madirosa" – Tamara Obrovac Transhistria ensemble / Époque Quartet (Cantus / Aquarius Records)
- 2014: "Ulika revival" – Tamara Obrovac quartet (Unit records)
- 2016: "Canto amoroso" – Tamara Obrovac Transhistria ensemble (Alessa Records)
- 2018: "Live@ZKM" – Tamara Obrovac Transhistria ensemble (Cantus)
- 2019: "TransAdriaticum" – Tamara Obrovac TransAdriatic quartet (Alessa Records)
- 2020: "Villa Idola" – Tamara Obrovac Transhistria ensemble / Croatian Radiotelevision Jazz Orchestra Aquarius Records
- 2023: "Nuvola" – Tamara Obrovac quartet (Cantus)

== Film scores ==
- 2003: "Stina" – Documentary film about famous Croatian painter Edo Murtić, directed by Rajko Grlić
- 2003: "Metahead" – animation movie, Zagrebfilm, author Branko Farac
- 2003: "Ptice" – radio drama, Croatian National radio, directed by Jasna Mesarić
- 2004: "Jasnovidka" – feature film, RTV Slovenia, directed by Biljana Čakić Veselič
- 2004: "Ono sve što znaš o meni" – feature film, directed by Bobo Jelčić and Nataša Rajković
- 2005: What Is a Man Without a Moustache? – feature film, directed by Hrvoje Hribar
- 2010: "Piran Pirano" – feature film, directed by Goran Vojnović
- 2011: "Night boats"- feature film, directed by Igor Mirković
- 2012: "Contrada" – short movie, directed by Matija Debeljuh
- 2015: "Jure Grando" – animation movie, author Martin Babić
- 2020: "Once were humans" – feature film, directed by Goran Vojnović

== Theatre music ==
- 1998: "Non era la quinta, era la nona", Istrian national Theatre Pula, directed by Robert Raponja
- 1999: "Manifestation of the Introvert", En Knapp Production, Ljubljana, choreographer Maja Delak
- 2000: "The Little Mermaid", Istrian national Theatre Pula, directed by Robert Raponja
- 2001: "The Dance of the Dead", Istrian National Theater Pula, the Musical Drama Fantasy, directed by Robert Raponja
- 2002: "Snow Queen", City Theatre Žar ptica Zagreb, directed by Dora Ružđak
- 2002: "Christmas at the Ivanov's", Zagreb Youth Theatre directed by Nebojša Borojević
- 2004: "Dog, woman, man" Theatre Exit Zagreb, directed by Zijah Sokolović
- 2004: "Vassa Zheleznova", Croatian National Theatre Zagreb, directed by Zlatko Sviben
- 2004: "Antigone" Croatian National Theater Split, directed by Matko Raguž
- 2005: "Ekoteka", A play for children, directed by Daska company, Sisak
- 2006: "Udovice/Widows", Croatian National Theatre in Split, directed by Dino Mustafić
- 2006: "Zagrljenici / Embraced", SARTR, Sarajevo War Theatre, directed by Robert Raponja
- 2006: "Titanic Orchestra", Istrian National Theatre Pula, directed by Dino Mustafić
- 2007: "Zmaj koji je kokice jeo/ The dragon that ate the popcorn", Split City Puppet Theatre, directed by Robi Waltl
- 2007: "The Cripple of Inishmaan", Narodno Pozorište Sarajevo, directed by Dino Mustafić
- 2007: "Bakery Miš Maš", The Slovenian Youth Theatre Ljubljana, directed by Robi Waltl
- 2007: "Empty Room in the Sun", Istrian National Theatre Pula, directed by Aleksandra Mišić
- 2007: "Regoč", Puppet Theatre Zadar, directed by Robi Waltl
- 2007: "Cruel and Tender", Istrian National Theatre Pula, directed by Lawrence Kiiru
- 2008: "The Ugly Duckling", Mini Theatre, Ljubljana, directed by Robert Waltl
- 2008: "The Taming of the Shrew", Croatian National Theatre in Rijeka, directed by Vito Taufer
- 2008: "Tablica dijeljenja / Division table", Istrian National Theatre Pula, directed by Ivan Leo Lemo
- 2009: "Tomizziana", Istrian National Theatre Pula, directed by Damir Zlatar Frei
- 2009: "Svarožić", (Slavic god), City Theatre of Puppets, Zagreb, directed by Krešimir Dolenčić
- 2009: "The Demon of Debar Maalo", Little City Theatre „Off the Channel", Sofia, Bulgaria, directed by Dino Mustafić
- 2011: "Passers-by", Croatian National Theatre in Osijek, directed by Borna Baletić
- 2013: "Silent Wedding (Nunta mută)", Maribor Slovene National Theatre, directed by Dino Mustafić
- 2014: "The dragon: a satiric fable in three acts”, Slovene National Theatre Nova Gorica, directed by Dino Mustafić
- 2015: “My friend Mačkodlak”, Split City Puppet Theatre, directed by Ivan Plazibat
- 2015: “Our Class”, Chamber Theater 55, Sarajevo, directed by Dino Mustafić
- 2016: “Vampire Chronicle Jure Grando”, Istrian National Theatre Pula, (songs), directed by Damir Zlatar Frei
- 2016: “Men of Wax”, Croatian National Theatre in Zagreb, directed by Janusz Kica
- 2017: “Aziz, or The Wedding That Saved the West”, Croatian National Theatre Split, directed by Dino Mustafić
- 2017: “Dirty Špiro and naughty Tonka”, Split City Puppet Theatre, directed by Ivan Plazibat
- 2017: “Apoxyiomenos”, ballet Croatian National Theatre in Zagreb / Théâtre de Liège choreographer Claudio Bernardo
- 2018: “King Lear”, Croatian National Theatre in Zagreb, directed by Janusz Kica
- 2018: “Of Mice and Men”, Barski ljetopis/City Theatre Podgorica, Montenegro, directed by Dino Mustafić
- 2019: “Goldberg variations”, Slovenian Permanent Theatre Trieste, directed by Robert Waltl
- 2020: “Sliparija”, Istrian National Theatre Pula, directed by Matija Debeljuh
- 2022: “Meja sneženja / Quota neve”, Slovenian Permanent Theatre Trieste, directed by Goran Vojnović
- 2022: “Okretište”, Croatian National Theatre Split, directed by Dino Mustafić
- 2023: “Ožalošćena porodica”, Kerempuh theater Zagreb, directed by Ivan Plazibat

== Audio books ==
- 2022: “Brigada del amanecer”, Milan Rakovac / Tamara Obrovac, Book&zvook, Zagreb

== Awards ==
- 2002: The Croatian national theatrical award: best music in a theatrical work for the play “Tanac od mrtvih (The Dance of the Dead)” (Istrian National Theatre)
- 2003: The “Golden smile” award: best music and performance for the play “Jelka kod Ivanovih (Christmas at the Ivanov's)”(Zagreb Youth Theatre)
- 2003: Zlatna koogla award for best Croatian female artist
- 2004: Porin (Croatian national music award) for best world music album, CD “Sve pasiva/All fades away"
- 2004: Nominated for BBC Radio 3 Awards for World Music (European music and audience award categories)
- 2005: Award for best music in a theatrical work for play "Antigone" @ Marulovi dani, Split
- 2006: Porin (Croatian national music award) for best female vocal performance, song "Daleko je..." / CD "Daleko je… is faraway”
- 2006: Porin: (Croatian national music award) best world music album, for CD “Daleko je… is faraway”
- 2006: Porin (Croatian national music award) for best vocal collaboration with Tedi Spalato, for song “Ti i ja”
- 2006: Golden Arena award (Croatian national film festival, Pula): best score for Hrvoje Hribar’s film “Što je muskarac bez brkova (What is a man without a mustache)”
- 2007: best music in a theatrical work for the play “Zagrljenici”, National theatrical festival Bosnia and Herzegovina
- 2007: Award for the best music in a theatrical work for the play “Zagrljenici”, 6th festival of Bosnian and Herzegovinian drama, Zenica
- 2008: Porin (Croatian national music award) for best female vocal performance of 2008.
- 2008: Award for best drama for its music at the festival Regoč Croatian Children’s drama festival
- 2008: “Mali Marulić”, Croatian Children’s drama festival, Award for the music in the theatre show “Regoč” by Ivana Brlić Mažuranić, performed by the Zadar Puppet Theatre
- 2009: President of the Republic of Croatia, the medal of the Order of Danica Hrvatska for outstanding achievements in culture
- 2009: 42nd PIF – International Puppet Theater Festival, the International Professional Jury Award for the music in the theatre show “Svarožić”, performed by the Zagreb Puppet Theatre (Zagreb, Croatia)
- 2009: Runjić’s evenings, Golden Seagull Award for the best remake of Runjić’s song “A vitar puše” awarded to Tamara Obrovac and Matija Dedić, Split 2009.
- 2010: Porin (Croatian national music award) for best Club music album, for CD “Neću više jazz kantati / I won’t Sing Jazz Any More”
- 2012: Porin (Croatian national music award) for best world music album for CD “Madirosa”
- 2012: Porin (Croatian national music award) for best female vocal performance, the song “Tango and cha cha cha” CD “Madirosa”
- 2013: professional jury award for best score for short film “Contrada”, director Matija Debeljuh, Croatian film days.
- 2013: Croatian Composers Society award “Miroslav Sedak Benčić”, 2015, for best jazz author
- 2017: International Small Scene Theatre Festival professional jury award for best music in the theatre show “Ljudi od voska”, performed by the Zagreb National Theatre (Rijeka, Croatia) 2017.
- 2019: Porin (Croatian national music award) for best Jazz composition “Suza sjajna / A shiny tear”, from CD “TransAdriaticum”.

== Performances (selection) ==
Germany (Düsseldorf Jazz Rally, Jazzahead’13, Lüneburger Jazz-Night, Le gipfel du jazz Freiburg, Bayerisher Hof Munchen, Laboratorium Stuttgart, Eisenach Jazzclub, etc.), Norway (Trondheim Jazz Festival), China (Beijing Cultural Palace of the Nationalities, Chuama festival), Belgium (Bozar Brussels, The Music Village Brussels, Balkan Trafik Festival), Austria (Porgy & Bess Vienna, Akkordeon Fest Vienna, Jazz Festival Steyr, Glatt & Verkehrt Musikfestival, Jazz club Klagenfurt, Kunsthaus Weiz, etc.), Switzerland (RSI Lugano, Bird’s Eye Basel, Moods Zurich), Italy (Alpsklang Festival Merano, Talos Jazz Fest, Trieste Loves Jazz, Mittelfest, AnteprimaMundus Fest, etc.), USA (Joe’s Pub NYC, Hot House Chicago), France (Strictly mundial Festival Marseille, L’Entrepot Paris, Maritime Festival Brest), Spain (Circulo Jazz club Madrid, Festival Ribermusica Barcelona, La Fira Mediterrania de Manresa), Morocco (Jazz au Chellah Festival), Greece (Dimithriathess Festival Thessaloníki), Poland (Crossroads Festival Krakow), Latvia (Saulkrasti Jazz Fest, Riga Jazz Club), Lithuania (Vilnius Jazz Festival), Finland (EBU Festival Kaustinen), BiH (Sarajevo Jazz Fest), Slovenia (Cankarjev dom club, Druga godba Festival, etc.), Israel (Rishon le Zion Tel Aviv), Japan (Expo), Croatia (everywhere :), Russia, Slovakia, Bulgaria, Turkey, Ireland and many more.
