= Croatian Popular Party (1997) =

Right-wing political party in Croatia

Croatian Popular Party (Croatian: Hrvatska pučka stranka, HPS) was a right-wing political party in Croatia.

The party was founded in 1997 by Tomislav Merčep after his departure from Croatian Democratic Union.

Merčep was the party candidate in the 2000 Croatian presidential election, and was eliminated in the first round as the seventh of nine candidates, winning 22,672 votes or 0.85% of the vote.

Tomislav Petrak (born 1946), a Ph.D. in veterinary science a professor at the Faculty of Food Technology and Biotechnology in Zagreb, member of the Party since its founding in 1997, was its candidate in the 2005 Croatian presidential election.

== Electoral history ==
=== Legislative ===
Election	In coalition with	Votes won	Percentage	Seats won	Change
2000	None	39,354	1.36%	0 / 151	Steady
2003	HP	8,048	0.32%	0 / 151	Steady

=== Presidential ===
Election	Candidate	Rank	1st round votes	Percentage	Rank	2nd round votes	Percentage
2000	Tomislav Merčep	8th	22,762	0.85%	—	—	—
2005	Tomislav Petrak	13th	2,614	0.12%	—	—	—
