= Karen Asatrian =

Armenian musician

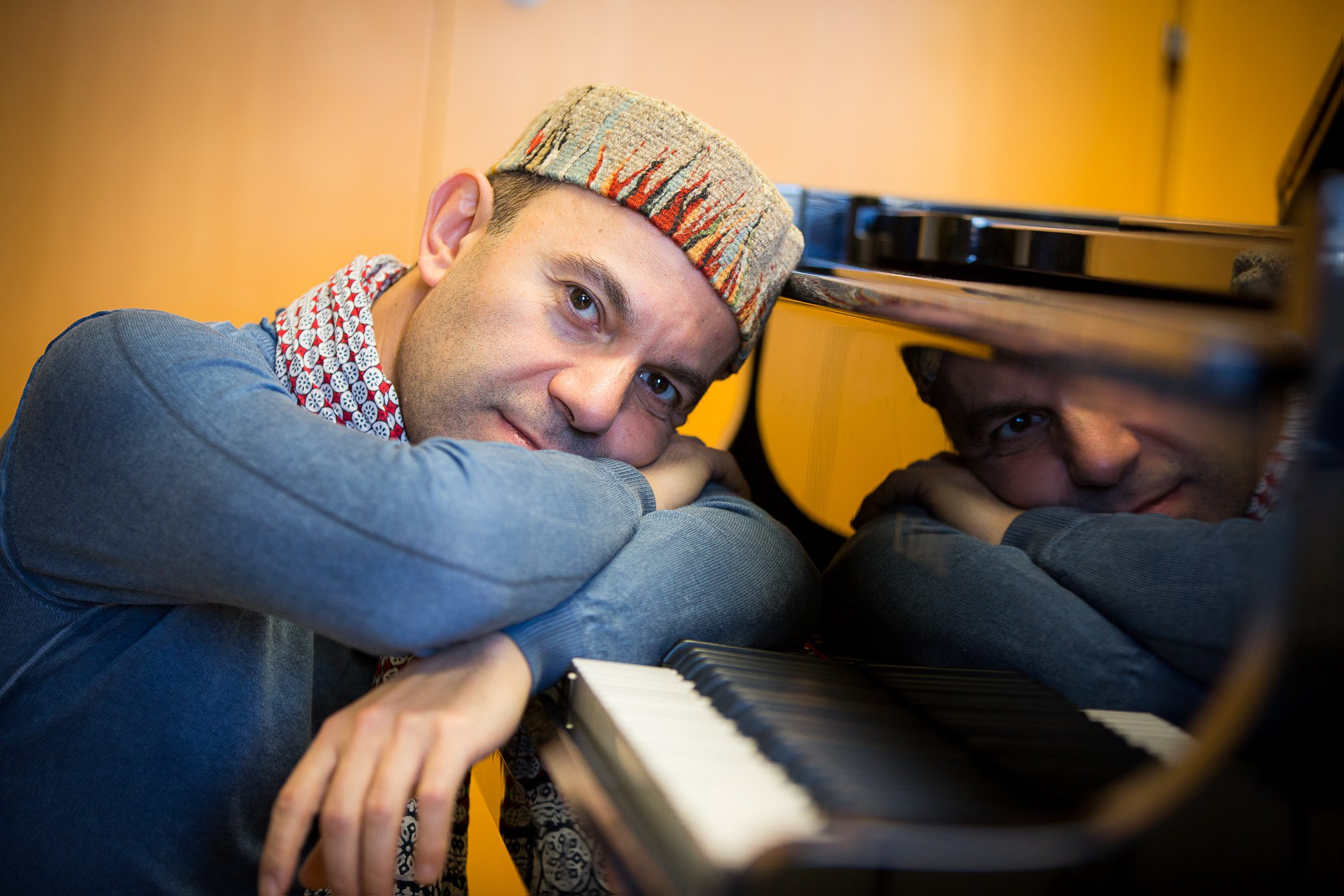
Karen Asatrian's photo

Karen Asatrian (Armenian: Կարեն Ասատրյան; born June 23, 1972) is an Armenian jazz pianist and composer. His music is a synthesis of contemporary jazz and Armenian folk music. The recent album "Noor" with Karen Asatrian and Armenian Spirit band is composed of Armenian traditional songs rearranged with a contemporary jazz style.

== Early life ==
Karen Asatrian received his first education in classical violin and piano at the Tchaikovsky Music School in Yerevan. He then continued his studies of both instruments and musical composition at the Komitas State Conservatory of Yerevan. In 1999, he moved to Carinthia, Austria, where he finalized his jazz piano studies under the direction of Harry Neuwirth, with distinction. In 2001, he graduated with a Bachelor of Fine Arts in Instrumental (Vocal) Pedagogy Studies and received a state teaching certification for jazz piano.

== Career ==
Significant highlights throughout Asatrian's musical career include the initiation of the "Brahms Project" (Jazz-Trio with Chamber Orchestra) and the presentation of his original compositions with the Norbert Artner Chamber Choir. He has collaborated with The Bruckner Symphony Orchestra, Samul-Nori (Korean percussion Ensembles), Dee Dee Bridgewater, George Garzone, and Jamaaladeen Tacuma. Performances within the “Three Nights of Jazz” Festivals in Saalfelden (Austria), Jazz Festivals Wiesn in Vienna, Sziget Festivals in Budapest. Rearrangement and performance of J. Brahms compositions; numerous live studio performances, radio and TV appearances. Asatrain has also participated in several Jazz formations in the Countries of Austria, Korea, Italy, Germany, the Netherlands, Slovenia, and Armenia. In 2007, Asatrian received the Armenian Music Award in the category of Best Jazz Album for his CD "Pathway".

In 2017, Asatrian composed the "Prayer Wheel" - a mass for Choir, Jazz-Ensemble. Premiere of the 80-minute-composition took place at the Concert Hall of Carinthia in January 2015 and was followed by further performances throughout Austria. This success was marked by the performance of Prayer Wheel within the Salzburg Festival 2016 in cooperation with the Philharmonia Choir Vienna. The latter has been recorded and released in 2017 as a CD by Skylark Production and is being distributed by Universal Music Austria. In addition to his artistic activities and performances, Karen Asatrian is a Jazz Piano-Professor at the Carinthian State Conservatory as well as at the University of Music and Performing Arts in Vienna.

== Discography ==
=== Albums ===
==== As leader ====
Year	Title	Act	Record label
2005	Arahet-Pathway	Karen Asatrian & Armenian Spirit	UNIVERSAL
2009	Derwish	Karen Asatrian & Armenian Spirit	UNIVERSAL
2017	Prayer Wheel	Missa for Choir & Jazz Ensemble by KARÉN ASATRIÁN	SKYLARK PRODUCTION
2018	Noor	Karen Asatrian & Armenian Spirit	SKYLARK PRODUCTION

==== As sidemen ====
- Primus Sitter, Premius Sitter Five (1998, New York)
- Gabriel Lipuš, A more, 1999
- Gabriel Lipuš, Malo čezz, 2000
- Gabriel Lipuš, Čisto čezz, 2000
- Big Band Lienz, Live 2001
- Couch Ensemble, Winnetou, 2003
- Bernie Mallinger, Mallinger Open Nut, 2004
- Bernie Mallinger, Mallinger Open Nut, 2004
- Couch Ensemble, Hyper Phlegmathism, 2016
