= Telegram.hr =

Croatian online newspaper

- Website type: Online newspaper
- Available in: Croatian
- Creator: Miran Pavić
- Website: www.telegram.hr
- Commercial: Yes
- Registration: Required for some services
- Launched: 2015
- Current status: Online

Telegram is a Croatian online news portal based in Zagreb. In addition to news and articles covering current affairs in politics, economics, science and culture, it features opinion pieces and columns by contributors whose political views are predominantly left-wing or liberal. The portal is particularly known for its investigative reporting on corruption and political scandals.

== History ==
From 2015 to 2016, Telegram also had a print edition, inspired by the eponymous magazine that was published from 1960 to 1973. In October 2016, Telegram launched Telesport, a specialised sports publication headed by Aleksandar Holiga. In May 2019, the lifestyle portal Super1 was incorporated into Telegram, and a month later it was reported that Telegram had more than one million unique monthly users.

== Editors-in-chief ==
- Igor Alborghetti (2015– 2016)
- Jelena Valentić (2016–present)
