= Matija Dedić =

Croatian jazz pianist and composer (1973–2025)

- Born: 2 March 1973; Zagreb, Croatia, Yugoslavia
- Died: 8 June 2025 (aged 52)
- Genres: Jazz
- Occupations: Musician; composer
- Instrument: Piano
- Years active: 1997–2025
- Label: Dallas
- Formerly of: Boilers quartet; Boilers All-Stars; Matija Dedić Trio
- Award: Porin award
- Parents: Arsen Dedić; Gabi Novak

Matija Dedić (2 March 1973 – 8 June 2025) was a Croatian jazz pianist and composer, son of singer-songwriter Arsen Dedić and singer Gabi Novak.

== Early life and education ==
Matija Dedić was born in Zagreb on 2 March 1973 to singer-songwriter Arsen Dedić and singer Gabi Novak. Through his paternal grandfather and maternal grandmother, Matija was of Croatian Serb and German descent, respectively. He completed his secondary music education at the Vatroslav Lisinski School of Music in Zagreb and, from 1991, studied at the University of Music and Performing Arts Graz under Harald Neuwirth.

== Career ==
Following his graduation in 1997, he returned to Zagreb to begin his professional career. Around this time he had been performing with the Boilers quartet, alongside trumpeter Davor Križić, bassist Mladen Baraković, and drummer Krunoslav Levačić. Their four albums, released between 1997 and 2003 (with the last album recorded in the band's big-band iteration, named Boilers All-Stars), include some compositions by Dedić. In the late 1990s, he founded the Matija Dedić Trio. The band, which drew musicians from the Obrovac quartet, namely bassist Žiga Golob and Krunoslav Levačić, performed in several European countries and the United States. During this period, Dedić collaborated with various jazz musicians, composed music for television and theatre, and worked with Croatian pop artists.

As a solo artist, Dedić released his debut album, Solo Part 1, in 2000. The following year, he issued Handwriting, an album that received three Porin awards in 2002. In 2004, Dallas Records released Tempera, which featured his interpretations of songs by Gibonni. The subsequent year, the same label issued Drugi pogled, a collection dedicated to the repertoire of his father, Arsen Dedić. In 2006, he collaborated with Belgian double bassist Jean‑Louis Rassinfosse on Visiting Bruxelles, and in 2008, he produced Life of Flowers, an album encompassing both his original compositions and works by Dora Pejačević. In 2011, Dedić released MD in NYC, which combined original material with renditions of selections by artists including Miles Davis, Herbie Hancock, Sting, and Beyoncé in a traditional jazz style.

Over the span of his career he was awarded the Porin on 38 occasions in various categories. He died on 8 June 2025, at the age of 52.
