= Pakračka Poljana camp =

Prisoner of war camp where war crimes were committed

- Prison camp
- Location: Pakračka Poljana, Croatia
- Operational: November 1991 – February 1992
- Inmates: Primarily Croatian Serbs but also others
- Killed: 22–43–70

The Pakračka Poljana camp was a makeshift prison camp where Croatian Serb civilians along with some Croats were held, tortured and executed by members of the Croatian Special Police commanded by Tomislav Merčep during the Croatian War of Independence. It was located in Pakračka Poljana, a village between the towns of Pakrac and Kutina.

== Background ==
In 1990, following the electoral defeat of the government of the Socialist Republic of Croatia by the Croatian Democratic Union (Croatian: Hrvatska demokratska zajednica, HDZ), ethnic tensions between Croats and Serbs worsened. The self-styled Republic of Serb Krajina (RSK) declared its intention to secede from Croatia and join the Republic of Serbia while the Government of the Republic of Croatia declared it a rebellion. According to the Croatian 1991 census, Serbs were the largest ethnic group in the municipality of Pakrac (46.4%), followed by Croats (35.8%). In March 1991, Pakrac was the site of violent clashes between Croatian authorities and ethnic Serbs. In June 1991 Croatia declared independence from Yugoslavia. Tensions eventually broke out into full-scale war, which lasted until 1995.

== Camp and crimes ==
The Pakračka Poljana case was first mentioned in 1992, after police obtained information on crimes allegedly committed by members of Mercep's unit during an investigation into the murder of the Zec family from Zagreb. The case was not investigated until September 1997, when the Feral Tribune published an interview with Miroslav Bajramovic, an ex-subcommander of the Croatian special police forces who stated that 280 people had been killed at Pakračka Poljana and that he had personally killed 72 of them. In the interview, Bajramovic described how he and his colleagues ran an elaborate detention center in Pakračka Poljana and Medurici, 60 miles southeast of Zagreb, where prisoners were tortured with electric shocks or doused with gasoline and burned alive. He said nearly all the prisoners were executed and buried in mass graves.

== Trials ==
Miroslav Bajramovic, Branko Saric, Munib Suljic, Sinisa Rimac, Zoran Karlovic and Igor Mikola were arrested and tried. Bajramovic and Saric were found guilty of lesser crimes of extortion and abduction, while the remaining four were acquitted of all charges, citing a lack of evidence. The Supreme Court in 2001 quashed the verdict and ordered a retrial, this time without Karlovic. Four years later, all the five men were found guilty. The case was completed in May 2006 when the Supreme Court increased Suljic's sentence from 10 to 12 years, and quashed Mikola's verdict and ordered a retrial for extortion, upholding his four-year sentence for aiding and abetting in murder. The court also upheld Rimac's sentence of eight years in prison, Bajramovic's sentence of four years in prison and Saric's sentence of three years in prison.

In 2016, Merčep was sentenced to five and a half years by the Zagreb County Court for war crimes committed by his unit that included Pakračka Poljana. In 2017, The Croatian Supreme Court upheld the verdict and increased his sentence to seven years.
