= Nedjeljna Dalmacija =

Yugoslavian regional weekly newspaper

Nedjeljna Dalmacija (Serbo-Croatian: Недјељна Далмација, lit. 'Sunday Dalmatia') was a Yugoslavian regional weekly newspaper based in Split, Croatia. Its publisher was Slobodna Dalmacija.
