= Croatian Music Institute =

Coordinates: 45°48′44″N 15°58′19″E

- Hrvatski glazbeni zavod
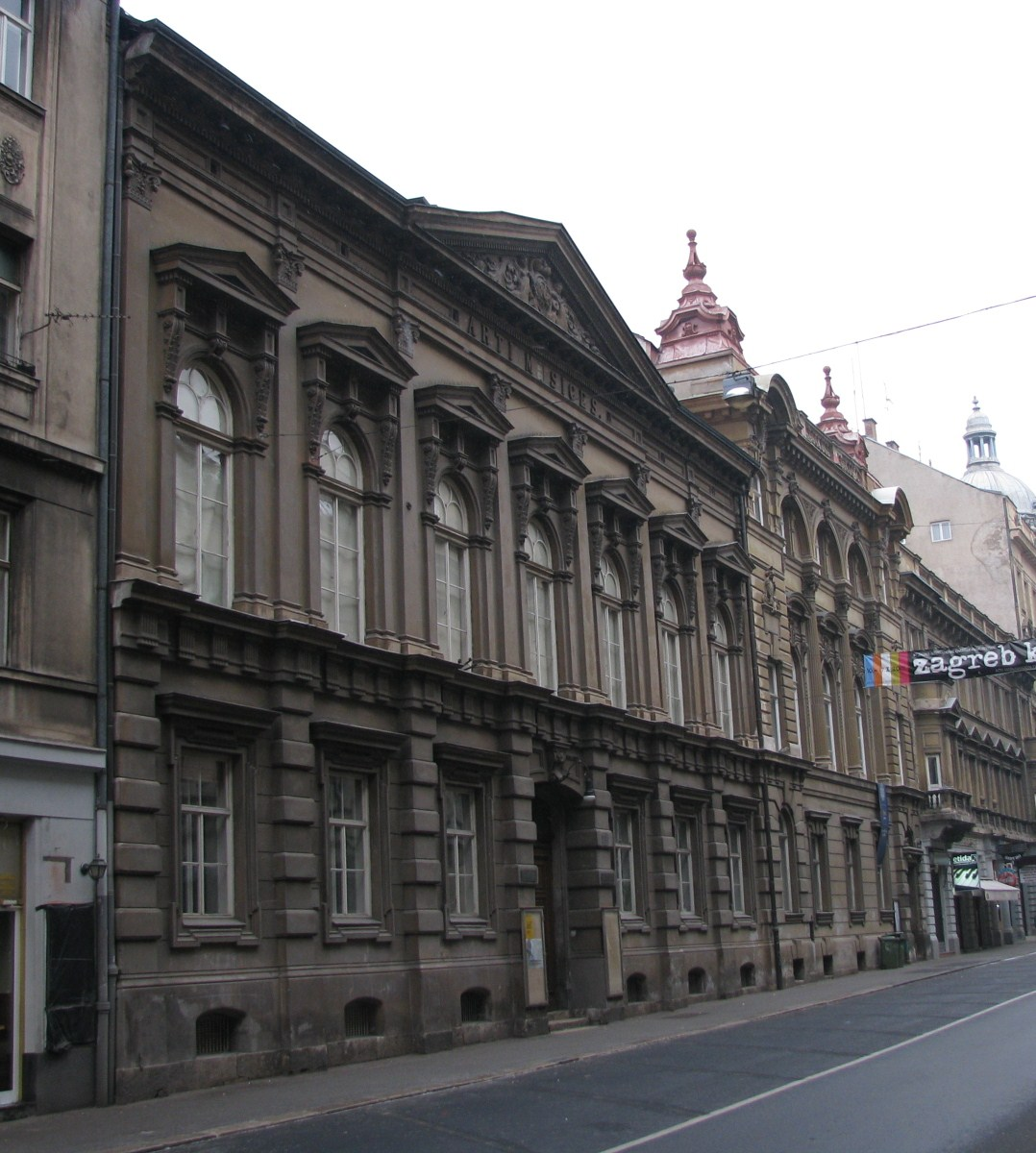
- Building of Croatian Music Institute in Gundulićeva Street, in Zagreb.
- Interactive map of Croatian Music Institute
- Address: 6-6A Gundulićeva Street; Zagreb, Croatia
- Type: Concert hall

Construction
- Opened: 1876
- Expanded: 1895
- Architects: Janko Grahor & Franjo Klein

Website
- www.hgz.hr

Cultural Good of Croatia
- Type: Protected cultural good
- Reference no.: Z-332

Croatian Music Institute (Croatian: Hrvatski glazbeni zavod, HGZ) is the oldest music institution in Croatia. It is the second most important concert hall in Zagreb after the Vatroslav Lisinski Concert Hall.

Institution was founded in 1827 as "Musikverein" (English: musical society) and has had different purposes through the years: organizing concerts in its concert hall, founding a music school (today the Zagreb Academy of Music), publishing the works of Croatian composers etc. According to writing of Večernji list, Croatian Music Institute also makes the oldest known Croatian Community association.

The concert hall is serving mainly for solo and chamber music concerts and is known for its rich acoustic. Some of the most famous artists that have performed there include: Franz Liszt, Sviatoslav Richter, David Oistrakh, Mstislav Rostropovich and many others.

== History ==
Croatian Music Institute was founded in 1827 under official name: "Societas filharmonica zagrabiensis", as society of music lovers. Colloquially it was called by germanism - Musikverein. Organization held its first concert on April 18 1827. In 1829, it founded its first music school. In 1887, its prominent members, such as Vatroslav Lisinski and Ljudevit Šplajt wrote its first bylaw, which described the organization as "national society which works on versatile promotion of musical art and science". Its music school eventually educated many prominent Croatian musicians, such as: Vatroslav Lisinski, Juraj Karlo Wisner-Morgenstern, Ivan Plemeniti Zajc and Vjekoslav Klaić. Its library, also founded in 1827, holds great value as it stores rare early scores of Croatian composers.

In 1876, society moved in what was then its own newly built building, in Gundulićeva Street, in Zagreb, where it is still located today. Its archives contain the legacy of many prominent Croatian composers such as: Dora Pejačević, Lovro Matačić etc.

Institute's building was severely damaged in 1880 Zagreb earthquake, so prominent architect Herman Bolle conducted restoration works on a staircase leading to the building's concert hall. In 1949 the building of the institute hosted the Second Congress of the Association of Writers of Yugoslavia. Since 1989, the building was protected as a "cultural monument" and in 2002, it was declared a Cultural Good of Croatia. It was again damaged in major earthquake that shook Zagreb in 2020 with new reconstruction and restoration works being underway since then.

== Croatian Music Institute presidents ==
- Franjo Gašparić, (1886 - 1890)
- Vladislav Cuculić, (1890 - 1892)
- Julije Drohobeczky, (1893 - 1919)
- Robert Siebenschein, (1919 - 1929)
- Antun Goglia, (1929 - 1946)
- Ivo Tijardović, (1946 - 1952)
- Milan Žepić, (1952 - 1976)
- Stjepko Humel, (1976 - 1991)
- Andre Mohorovičić, (1991 - 2002)
- Marcel Bačić, (2002 - 2018)
- Niko Đurić, (2018)
- Romana Matanovac Vučković, (2018 -)

== Gallery ==
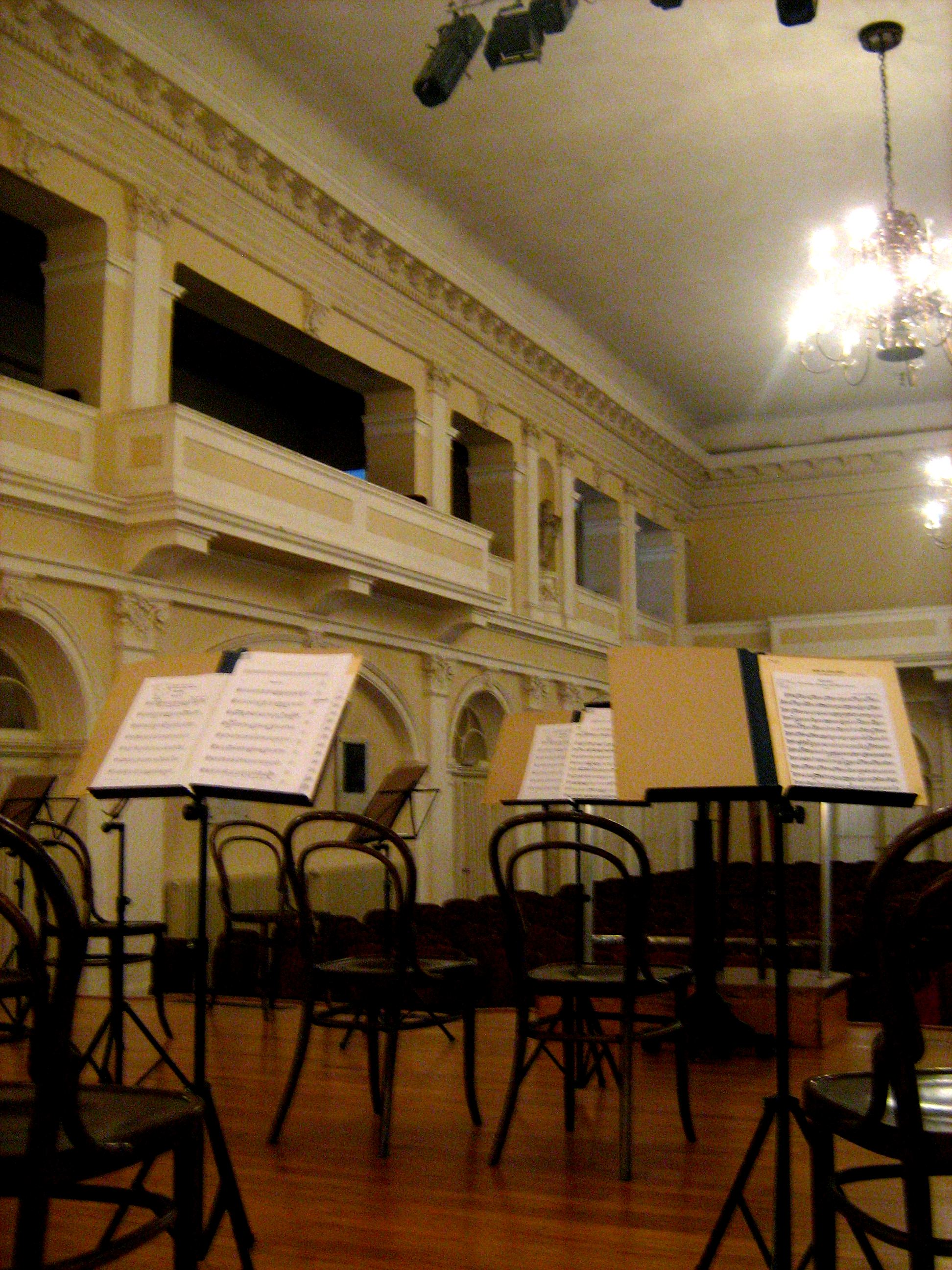
Concert Hall of Croatian Music Institute.

== See also ==
- List of concert halls
