= List of Croatian singers =

This is a list of singers from Croatia.

== A ==
- Meri Andraković
- Saša Antić

== B ==
- Baby Lasagna
- Lidija Bačić
- Nina Badrić
- Sandra Bagarić
- Lidija Bajuk
- Baks
- Franka Batelić
- Željko Bebek
- Ana Bebić
- Neno Belan
- Claudia Beni
- Roko Blažević
- Van Bod
- Mladen Bodalec
- Davorin Bogović
- Davor Borno
- Tomislav Bralić
- Jure Brkljača
- Bernarda Brunović
- Michael Bublé (Croatian ancestry)
- Lorena Bućan
- Nikol Bulat
- Mate Bulić

== C ==
- Joško Čagalj Jole
- Nives Celsius
- Max Emanuel Cenčić
- Sandi Cenov
- Meri Cetinić
- Tony Cetinski
- Vinko Coce
- Branko Črnac Tusta
- Igor Cukrov
- Matija Cvek
- Zrinka Cvitešić

== D ==
- Giuliano Đanić
- Ivan Dečak
- Arsen Dedić
- Ljupka Dimitrovska
- Mia Dimšić
- Antonela Đinđić
- Natali Dizdar
- Sanja Doležal
- Darko Domijan
- Oliver Dragojević
- Petar Dragojević
- Doris Dragović
- Davor Dretar
- Rafael Dropulić
- Dino Dvornik

== E ==
- Ksenija Erker

== G ==
- Ivo Gamulin Gianni
- Zlatan Stipišić Gibonni
- Arijana Marić Gigliani
- Davor Gobac
- Sofia Ameli Gojić
- Tomislav Goluban
- Petar Grašo
- Albina Grčić
- Mladen Grdović
- Grše
- Bobby Grubic

== H ==
- Diana Haller
- Jacques Houdek
- Jasenko Houra
- Dragutin Hrastović

== J ==
- Lu Jakelić
- Bojan Jambrošić
- Dino Jelusick
- Marin Jurić Čivro
- Eni Jurišić
- Ibrica Jusić

== K ==
- Goran Karan
- Damir Kedžo
- Ivana Kindl
- Daria Kinzer
- Dunja Knebl
- Emilija Kokić
- Anđela Kolar
- Adam Končić
- Zorica Kondža
- Martin Kosovec
- Ivana Kovač
- Mišo Kovač
- Sonja Kovač
- Zdenka Kovačiček
- Nina Kraljić
- Zvonimir Krkljuš
- Duško Kuliš
- Karin Kuljanić
- Marko Kutlić

== L ==
- La Lana
- Frano Lasić
- Indira Levak
- Josipa Lisac
- Lorde (Croatian ancestry)
- Radoslav Lorković
- Elis Lovrić
- Saša Lozar

== M ==
- Martina Majerle
- Nikola Marjanović
- Danijela Martinović
- Sandy Marton
- Sanya Mateyas
- Amira Medunjanin
- Karlo Metikoš
- Miach
- Sandra Mihanovich (Croatian ancestry)
- Ivan Mikulić
- Igor Milić
- Minea
- Barbara Munjas
- Tomislav Mužek

== N ==
- Elena Naperotić
- Goran Navojec
- Mia Negovetić
- Aklea Neon
- Ljiljana Nikolovska
- Luka Nižetić
- Gabi Novak
- Boris Novković
- Viktorija Novosel

== O ==
- Tamara Obrovac

== P ==
- Jurica Pađen
- Zlatko Pejaković
- Marina Perazić
- Žanamari Perčić
- Marko Perković Thompson
- Vesna Pisarović
- Antonia Dora Pleško
- Vlatka Pokos
- Renata Pokupić
- Danijel Popović

== R ==
- Jelena Radan
- Ivana Radovniković
- Sementa Rajhard
- Ivo Robić
- Hari Rončević
- Jelena Rozga

== S ==
- Renata Sabljak
- Massimo Savić
- Severina
- Kićo Slabinac
- Đana Smajo
- Jasmin Stavros
- Nera Stipičević
- Vera Svoboda

== Š ==
- Ivica Šerfezi
- Miroslav Škoro
- Lana Škrgatić
- Antonija Šola
- Boris Štok
- Maja Šuput
- Andrea Šušnjara
- Radojka Šverko

== T ==
- Tajči
- Marko Tolja
- ToMa
- Martina Tomčić
- Dado Topić
- Nika Turković

== U ==
- Neda Ukraden
- Damir Urban

== V ==
- Vanna
- Kim Verson
- Eric Vidović
- Alen Vitasović
- Martina Vrbos
- Brigita Vuco
- Siniša Vuco
- Severina Vučković
- Alka Vuica
- Vice Vukov

== Z ==
- Dražen Zečić
- Jasna Zlokić
- Davor Zovko
- Zsa Zsa

== Ž ==
- Domenica Žuvela

== See also ==
- List of Croatian composers
- List of Croatian artists
- List of Croatian writers
