= List of stage names: B =

This list of stage names lists names used by those in the entertainment industry, alphabetically by their stage name's surname (or the best approximation) followed by the given name (or the best approximation) where the surname begins with "B". One-word stage name are presented in List of one-word stage names.

Stage name	Birth name	Life	Notability	Notes
Bun B	Bernard James Freeman	1973–	American rapper	
Cardi B	Belcalis Marlenis Almanzar	1992–	American rapper	
Cheryl B	Cheryl Burke	1972–2011	American journalist	
Derek B	Derek Boland	1965–2009	British rapper	
Eric B.	Louis Eric Barrier	1963–	American rapper (Eric B. & Rakim)	
Jazzie B	Trevor Beresford Romeo	1963–	British DJ and producer (Soul II Soul)	
Jazzy B	Jaswinder Singh Bains	1975–	Indo-Canadian Punjabi singer-songwriter	
Jon B.	Jonathan David Buck	1974–	American singer-songwriter and producer	
Katy B	Kathleen Anne Brien	1989–	English singer-songwriter	
Max B	Charly Wingate	1978–	American rapper and singer	Also known as Max Biggaveli
Mel B	Melanie Janine Brown	1975–	English singer-songwriter and television personality (Spice Girls)	
Plan B	Benjamin Paul Ballance-Drew	Unknown	English rapper, songwriter, and actor	Also known as Ben Drew, DTPB, Maximus' Papa, Paulio and Mr Kortni
Rels B	Daniel Heredia Vidal	1993–	Spanish rapper, songwriter and record producer	
Roxee B	Anne Roxanne Barcelo	1985–	Filipino-American actress, model and singer	
Lída Baarová	Ludmila Babková	1914–2000	Czech actress	
Bob Babbitt	Robert Andrew Kreinar	1937–2012	Hungarian-American musician (The Funk Brothers)	
Alice Babs	Hildur Alice Nilson	1924–2014	Swedish singer and actress	
Michael Bacall	Michael Stephen Bucellato	1973–	American screenwriter and actor	
Barbara Bach	Barbara Goldbach	1947–	American actress and model	
Catherine Bach	Catherine Bachman	1954–	American actress	
Sebastian Bach	Sebastian Philip Bierk	1968–	Canadian-American singer (Skid Row)	
Erykah Badu	Erica Abi Wright	1971–	American singer-songwriter	
Mike Bahía	Michael Egred Mejía	1987–	Colombian singer	
Barbara Bain	Mildred Fogel	1931–	American actress	
Cheryl Baker	Rita Maria Crudgington	1954–	English singer and television presenter (Bucks Fizz)	
Fay Baker	Fay Schwager	1917–1987	American actress	
George Baker	Johannes Bouwens	1944–	Dutch singer and songwriter (George Baker Selection)	
Josephine Baker	Freda Josephine McDonald	1906–1975	American-born French dancer, singer and actress	
LaVern Baker	Delores Evans	1929–1997	American singer	Also known as Delores LaVern Baker, Delores Williams, Little Miss Sharecropper and Bea Baker
George Balanchine	Georgiy Melitonovich Balanchivadze	1904–1983	Russian-American ballet choreographer	
Josiane Balasko	Josiane Balašković	1950–	French actress, writer and director	
Carla Balenda	Sally Bliss	1925–2024	American actress	
Marty Balin	Martyn Jerel Buchwald	1942–2018	American singer, songwriter and musician (Jefferson Airplane and Jefferson Starship)	
Bobby Ball	Robert Harper	1944–2020	English comedian and actor (Cannon and Ball)	
Johnny Ball	Graham Thalben Ball	1938–	English television personality	
Carl Ballantine	Meyer Kessler	1917–2009	American magician, comedian and actor	
Kaye Ballard	Catherine Gloria Balotta	1925–2019	American actress, comedienne and singer	
Yak Ballz	Yashar Zadeh	1982–	American rapper	
Charli Baltimore	Tiffany Lane Jarmon	1974–	American rapper and television personality	
J Balvin	José Álvaro Osorio Balvin	1985–	Colombian singer	
Afrika Bambaataa	Lance Taylor	1957–	American DJ, rapper and producer	
Jamie Bamber	Jamie St John Bamber Griffith	1973–	English actor	
Eric Bana	Eric Banadinovich	1968–	Australian actor	
Anne Bancroft	Anna Maria Louisa Italiano	1931–2005	American actress	
Rigoberta Bandini	Paula Ribó González	1990–	Spanish singer and voice actress	
Honey Bane	Donna Tracy Boylan	1964–	English singer and actress	
Billy Bang	William Vincent Walker	1947–2011	American musician and composer	
Advent Bangun	Advani Rangua	1952–2018	Indonesian karateka champion	
Darrell Banks	Darrell Eubanks	1937–1970	American singer	
Elizabeth Banks	Elizabeth Irene Mitchell	1974–	American actress and filmmaker	
Lloyd Banks	Christopher Charles Lloyd	1982–	American rapper (G-Unit)	
Peter Banks	Peter William Brockbanks	1947–2013	English musician (Yes)	
Vilma Bánky	Vilma Koncsics	1901–1991	Hungarian-American actress	
David Banner	Lavell William Crump	1974–	American rapper, producer and actor (Crooked Lettaz)	
Jill Banner	Mary Kathryn Molumby	1946–1982	American actress	
Al Bano	Albano Antonio Carrisi	1943–	Italian singer and actor (Al Bano and Romina Power)	
Buju Banton	Mark Anthony Myrie	1973–	Jamaican musician	
Theda Bara	Theodosia Burr Goodman	1885–1955	American actress	
Joan Barclay	Mary Elizabeth Greear	1914–2002	American actress	
Roy Barcroft	Howard Harold Ravenscroft	1902–1969	American actor	
Ben Bard	Benjamin Greenberg	1893–1974	American actor	
John Bardon	John Michael Jones	1939–2014	English actor	
Lynn Bari	Marjorie Schuyler Fisher	1919–1989	American actress	
Tim Barlow	Michael John Leigh Barlow	1936–2023	English actor	
Griff Barnett	Manley Griffith	1884–1958	American actor	
Candy Barr	Juanita Dale Slusher	1935–2005	American dancer, actress and model	
Julia Barr	Julia Rose Buchheit	1949–	American actress	
Kathy Barr	Marilyn Sultana Aboulafia	1929–2008	American singer	
Leonard Barr	Leonard Barra	1903–1980	American comedian, actor and dancer	
Judith Barrett	Lucille Kelley	1909–2000	American actress	Also known as Nancy Dover
Majel Barrett	Majel Leigh Hudec	1932–2008	American actress and producer	
Rona Barrett	Rona Burstein	1936–	American gossip columnist	
Alicia Barrié	Sara Ramona Alicia Masriera del Campillo	1915–2002	Chilean actress	
Amanda Barrie	Shirley Anne Broadbent	1935–	English actress	
Barbara Barrie	Barbara Ann Berman	1931–	American actress and author	
Chris Barrie	Christopher Jonathan Brown	1960–	British actor, comedian and impressionist	
Mona Barrie	Mona Barlee Smith	1905–1964	English-American actress	
Wendy Barrie	Marguerite Wendy Jenkins	1912–1978	British-born American actress	
Alain Barrière	Alain Bellec	1935–2019	French singer	
Blue Barron	Harry Freidman	1913–2005	American bandleader	
Chris Barron	Christopher Barron Gross	1968–	American singer and songwriter (Spin Doctors)	
Claire Barry	Clara Bagelman	1920–2014	American singer and entertainer (The Barry Sisters)	
Don "Red" Barry	Milton Poimboeuf	1910–1980	American actor	
Gene Barry	Eugene Klass	1919–2009	American actor	
Jack Barry	Jack Barasch	1918–1984	American game show host, television personality and executive	
Jeff Barry	Joel Adelberg	1938–	American singer-songwriter, and record producer	
Joan Barry	Ina Florence Marshman Bell	1903–1989	English actress	
Joan Barry	Mary Louise Gribble	1920–2007	American actress	
Joe Barry	Joseph Barrios	1939–2004	American singer	
John Barry	John Barry Prendergast	1933–2011	English composer and conductor	
Len Barry	Leonard Warren Borisoff	1942–2020	American singer and songwriter	
Merna Barry	Minnie Bagelman	1923–1976	American singer and entertainer (The Barry Sisters)	
Diana Barrymore	Diana Blanche Barrymore Blythe	1921–1960	American actress	
Ethel Barrymore	Ethel Mae Blyth	1879–1959	American actress	
John Barrymore	John Sidney Blyth	1882–1942	American actor	
Lionel Barrymore	Lionel Herbert Blyth	1878–1954	American actor	
Maurice Barrymore	Herbert Arthur Chamberlayne Blyth	1849–1905	British actor	
Michael Barrymore	Michael Ciaran Parker	1952–	English actor, comedian and presenter	
Lionel Bart	Lionel Begleiter	1930–1999	English writer and composer	
Eddie Barth	Edward Michael Bartholetti	1931–2010	American actor	
Dewey Barto	Stewart (or Steward) Swoyer	1896–1973	American comedian and actor	
Eva Bartok	Éva Márta Szőke Ivanovics	1927–1998	Hungarian-English actress	
Gregg Barton	Harold Wilson Barker	1912–2000	American actor	
Billy Barty	William John Bertanzetti	1924–2000	American actor and activist	
Baby Bash	Ronald Ray Bryant	1969–	American rapper	Formerly known as Baby Beesh
Toni Basil	Antonia Christina Basilotta	1943–	American singer, dancer and actress	
Elya Baskin	Ilya Zalmanovich Baskin	1950–	Latvian-American actor	
Ol' Dirty Bastard	Russell Tyrone Jones	1968–2004	American musician (Wu-Tang Clan)	
Skratch Bastid	Paul Murphy	1982–	Canadian DJ and record producer	
Florence Bates	Florence Rabe	1888–1954	American actress	
Jane Bathori	Jeanne-Marie Berthier	1877–1970	French opera singer	
Stiv Bators	Steven John Bator	1949–1990	American singer and musician (Dead Boys)	
Franco Battiato	Francesco Battiato	1945–2021	Italian musician, singer, composer, filmmaker and painter	As a painter, uses the name Süphan Barzani
Steven Bauer	Esteban Ernesto Echevarría Samson	1956–	Cuban-born American actor	
Beryl Baxter	Beryl Mavis Ivory	1926–2012	English actress	
Jane Baxter	Feodora Kathleen Alice Forde	1909–1996	British actress	
H. P. Baxxter	Hans Peter Geerdes	1964–	German musician and singer (Scooter)	
Nora Bayes	Rachel Eleonora Goldberg	1880–1928	American singer and entertainer	Also known as Dora Goldberg and Nora Bayes Friedland
Prince Be	Attrell Stephen Cordes Jr.	1970–2016	American musician (P.M. Dawn)	
Aisling Bea	Aisling Clíodhnadh O'Sullivan	1984–	Irish comedienne, actress and writer	
John Beal	James Alexander Bliedung	1909–1997	American actor	
Orson Bean	Dallas Frederick Burrows	1928–2020	American actor and comedian	
Guy Béart	Guy Béhart-Hasson (originally spelled Béhar-Hassan)	1930–2015	French singer and songwriter	
Swizz Beatz	Kasseem Daoud Dean	1978–	American record producer, rapper, DJ and songwriter	
Bonnie Bedelia	Bonnie Bedelia Culkin	1948–	American actress	
Barbara Bedford	Violet May Rose	1903–1981	American actress	
Kenny Bee	Chung Chun-to	1953–	Hong Kong singer, musician and actor (The Wynners)	
Molly Bee	Mollie Gene Beachboard	1939–2009	American singer	
Captain Beefheart	Don Glen Vliet	1941–2010	American singer-songwriter	Later known as Don Van Vliet
Geoffrey Beene	Samuel Albert Bozeman Jr.	1924–2004	American fashion designer	
Jacqueline Beer	Jacqueline Vangramberg	1932–	French actress	Also known as Jacqueline Baer
Lou Bega	David Lubega Balemezi	1975–	German singer	
Dajos Béla	Leon Golzmann	1897–1978	Russian jazz violinist and bandleader	
Harry Belafonte	Harold George Bellanfanti Jr.	1927–2023	American singer, actor and civil rights activist	
Ana Belén	María del Pilar Cuesta Acosta	1951–	Spanish actress and singer	
Benny Bell	Benjamin Samberg	1906–1999	American singer-songwriter	
Carey Bell	Carey Bell Harrington	1936–2007	American musician	
Freddie Bell	Ferdinando Dominick Bello	1931–2008	American musician (Freddie Bell and the Bellboys)	
Rex Bell	George Francis Beldam	1903–1962	American actor and politician	
William Bell	William Yarborough	1939–	American singer and songwriter	
Madge Bellamy	Margaret Derden Philpott	1899–1990	American actress	
Camilla Belle	Camilla Belle Routh	1986–	American actress, director and producer	
Lulu Belle	Myrtle Eleanor Cooper	1913–1999	American musician and singer (Lulu Belle and Scotty)	
Louie Bellson	Luigi Paolino Alfredo Francesco Antonio Balassoni	1924–2009	American musician	
Tony Bellus	Anthony J. Bellusci	1936–2025	American singer and musician	
Bessie Bellwood	Catherine Mahoney	1856–1896	English performer and actress	
Pamela Bellwood	Pamela King	1951–	American actress	
Lead Belly	Huddie William Ledbetter	1888–1949	American folk and blues singer	
Ricky Belmonte	Jesus Velez Cruz	1946–2001	Filipino actor	
Silvester Belt	Silvestras Beltė	1997–	Lithuanian singer and songwriter	
Paul Ben-Victor	Paul Friedman	1965–	American actor	
Amelia Bence	María Amelia Batvinik	1919–2016	Argentine actress	
Oliver Bendt	Jörg Knoch	1946–	German singer and actor	
Dirk Benedict	Dirk Niewoehner	1945–	American actor	
Brenda Benet	Brenda Ann Nelson	1945–1982	American actress	
Owen Benjamin	Owen Smith	1980–	American comedian, actor and internet personality	
Chloe Bennet	Chloé Wang	1992–	American actress and singer	
Bruce Bennett	Harold Herman Brix	1906–2007	American actor	
Frank Bennett	David Henry Wray	1959–	Australian singer	
Michael Bennett	Michael DiFiglia	1943–1987	American musical theatre director, writer, choreographer and dancer	
Tony Bennett	Anthony Dominick Benedetto	1926–2023	American singer	
Bob Benny	Emilius Wagemans	1926–2011	Belgian singer	
Jack Benny	Benjamin Kubelsky	1894–1974	American comedian, actor and radio personality	
Irving Benson	Irving Wishnew	1914–2016	American actor and comedian	
Jo Jo Benson	Joseph M. Hewell	1938–2014	American singer	
Fonzworth Bentley	Derek Watkins	1974–	American rapper	
Barbi Benton	Barbara Lynn Klein	1950–	American model, actress, television personality and singer	
Dave Benton	Efrem Eugene Benita	1951–	Aruban musician and singer	
Oscar Beregi	Oszkár Berger	1876–1965	Hungarian and American actor	
Tom Berenger	Thomas Michael Moore	1949–	American actor	
Jack Kid Berg	Judah Bergman	1909–1991	English boxer	Also known as Jackie Kid Berg
Thomas Berge	Chiel Thomas Ottink	1990–	Dutch singer	
Edgar Bergen	Edgar John Berggren	1903–1978	American ventriloquist, actor and comedian	
Polly Bergen	Nellie Paulina Burgin	1930–2014	American actress and singer	
Michel Berger	Michel Jean Hamburger	1947–1992	French singer and songwriter	
Ouida Bergère	Eunie Branch	1886–1974	American screenwriter and actress	
Elisabeth Bergner	Ella vel Ettel Bergner	1897–1986	Austrian-English actress	
Ballard Berkeley	Ballard Blascheck	1904–1988	English actor	
Busby Berkeley	Berkeley William Enos	1895–1976	American director and choreographer	
Steven Berkoff	Leslie Steven Berks	1937–	English actor, author and playwright	
Daisy Berkowitz	Scott Mitchell Putesky	1968–2017	American musician (Marilyn Manson)	
Arthur Berkut	Artur Vyacheslavovich Mikheev	1962–	Russian singer (Aria)	
Milton Berle	Mendel Berlinger	1908–2002	American actor and comedian	
Irving Berlin	Israel Isidore Beilin	1888–1989	American composer and lyricist	
Mina Bern	Mina Bernholtz	1911–2010	Polish-American actress	
Paul Bern	Paul Levy	1889–1932	German-American director, screenwriter, and producer	
Carlos Bernard	Carlos Bernard Papierski	1962–	American actor and director	
Judd Bernard	Sherman Bernard Goldberg	1927–2022	American producer and screenwriter	
Ben Bernie	Bernard Anzelevitz	1891–1943	American musician, bandleader and radio personality	
Bob Bert	Robert Bertelli	1955–	American drummer	
Eddie Bert	Edward Joseph Bertolatus	1922–2012	American musician	
Francesca Bertini	Elena Seracini Vitiello	1892–1985	Italian actress	
Bibi Besch	Bibiana Maria Köchert	1942–1996	Austrian-American actress	
James Best	Jewel Franklin Guy	1926–2015	American actor	
Laura Betti	Laura Trombetti	1927–2004	Italian actress	
Billy Bevan	William Bevan Harris	1887–1957	Australian-American comedian and actor	
Babs Beverley	Babette Patricia Chinery	1927–2018	English singer (The Beverley Sisters)	
Joy Beverley	Joycelyn Victoria Barbara Chinery	1924–2015	English singer (The Beverley Sisters)	
Teddie Beverley	Hazel Pamela Chinery	1927–2026	English singer (The Beverley Sisters)	
Turhan Bey	Turhan Gilbert Selahattin Şahultavi	1922–2012	Austrian-Turkish actor	
Yasiin Bey	Dante Terrell Smith	1973–	American rapper and actor	Formerly known as Mos Def
Bhad Bhabie	Danielle Bregoli	2003–	American rapper and internet personality	
Jello Biafra	Eric Boucher	1958–	American singer and activist (Dead Kennedys)	
Viva Bianca	Viva Skubiszewski	1983–	Australian actress	
Mr. Biggs	Ellis William	1941–	American singer-songwriter and producer (The Isley Brothers)	
Bushwick Bill	Richard Shaw	1966–2019	Jamaican rapper	
Paul Birch	Paul Smith	1912–1969	American actor	
Harley Bird	Harley Fiona Riley	2001–	English actress	
Peter Birrel	Peter Cohen	1935–2004	English actor	
Beeb Birtles	Gerard Bertelkamp	1948–	Australian musician, singer and songwriter (Little River Band)	
Chuck Biscuits	Charles Montgomery	1965–	Canadian musician (Danzig)	
Joey Bishop	Joseph Abraham Gottlieb	1918–2007	American actor and comedian (Rat Pack)	
Julie Bishop	Jacqueline Brown	1914–2001	American actress	Previously known as Jacqueline Wells; also known as Diane Duval
Stephen Bishop	Stephen Kovacevich	1940–	American classical pianist and conductor	Stage name used early in his career; he since has reverted to using his birth name; also known as Stephen Bishop-Kovacevich
Josie Bissett	Jolyn Heutmaker	1970–	American actress	
Aloe Blacc	Egbert Dawkins III	1979–	American singer, songwriter and rapper	
Big Black	Christopher Boykin	1972–2017	American television personality and musician	
Cilla Black	Priscilla White	1943–2015	English singer, television presenter and actress	
Jack Black	Thomas Black	1969–	American actor, comedian and musician	
Jet Black	Brian Duffy	1938–2022	English musician (The Stranglers)	
Karen Black	Karen Blanche Ziegler	1939–2013	American actress, screenwriter, singer and songwriter	
Luke Black	Luka Ivanović	1992–	Serbian singer and songwriter	
Michael Ian Black	Michael Schwartz	1971–	American comedian, actor, screenwriter and director	
Tony Blackplait	Tõnu Trubetsky	1963–	Estonian musician, director and anarchist	
Harry Blackstone Sr.	Henry Boughton	1885–1965	American magician	Also known as Harry Bouton Blackstone
Richard Blackwell	Richard Selzer	1922–2008	American fashion critic, journalist and television/radio personality	Also known as "Mr. Blackwell"
Richard Blade	Richard Thomas Sheppard	1952–	English-born American radio personality and actor	
David Blaine	David Blaine White	1973–	American illusionist and endurance artist	
Hal Blaine	Harold Simon Belsky	1929–2019	American musician	
Vivian Blaine	Vivian Stapleton	1921–1995	American actress and singer	
Betsy Blair	Elizabeth Winifred Boger	1923–2009	American actress	
Janet Blair	Martha Janet Lafferty	1921–2007	American singer and actress	
Joyce Blair	Joyce Ogus	1932–2006	English actress and dancer	
Lionel Blair	Henry Lionel Ogus	1928–2021	Canadian-English actor, choreographer, dancer and television presenter	
Patricia Blair	Patsy Lou Blake	1933–2013	American actress	Also known as Patricia Blake or Pat Blake
Amanda Blake	Beverly Louise Neill	1929–1989	American actress	
James Blake	James Blake Litherland	1988–	English singer-songwriter	
Pamela Blake	Adele Pearce	1915–2009	American actress	
Robert Blake	Michael James Gubitosi	1933–2023	American actor	
Tia Blake	Christiana Elizabeth Wallman	1952–2015	American singer-songwriter and writer	
Whitney Blake	Nancy Whitney	1926–2002	American actress, director and producer	
Nida Blanca	Dorothy Guinto Jones	1936–2001	Filipina actress	
Benny Blanco	Benjamin Joseph Levin	1988–	American producer	
Clara Blandick	Clara Blanchard Dickey	1876–1962	American actress	
Marcie Blane	Marcia Blank	1944–	American former singer	
Sally Blane	Elizabeth Jane Young	1910–1997	American actress	
Memphis Bleek	Malik Deshawn Cox	1978–	American rapper	
Chingo Bling	Pedro Herrera III	1979–	Mexican-American rapper, producer and comedian	
Edith Bliss	Eda Bliss	1959–2012	Australian singer and television presenter	
Buster Bloodvessel	Douglas Steven Trendle	1958–	English singer (Bad Manners)	
Luka Bloom	Kevin Barry Moore	1955–	Irish singer-songwriter	
Kurtis Blow	Curtis Walker	1959–	American rapper, singer and songwriter	
Sky Blu	Skyler Austen Gordy	1986–	American musician	
Ashley Blue	Oriana Small	1981–	American actress	
Barry Blue	Barry Ian Green	1950–	English singer, producer and songwriter	
Ben Blue	Benjamin Bernstein	1901–1975	Canadian-American actor and comedian	
Jonas Blue	Guy James Robin	1989–	English DJ, songwriter and record producer	
Monte Blue	Gerard Montgomery Bluefeather	1887–1963	American actor	
Larry Blyden	Ivan Blieden	1925–1975	American actor	
Betty Blythe	Elizabeth Blythe Slaughter	1893–1972	American actress	
Eddie Bo	Edwin Joseph Bocage	1930–2009	American singer and musician	
Jim Bob	James Robert Morrison	1960–	English musician, singer and author (Carter the Unstoppable Sex Machine)	
DJ Bobo	Peter René Baumann	1968–	Swiss singer-songwriter, rapper, dancer and producer	
Willie Bobo	William Correa	1934–1983	American musician	
Joe Bocan	Johanne Beauchamp	1957–	Canadian singer and actress	
Van Bod	Vladimir Bodegrajac	1978–	Croatian composer, musician and singer	
Big Boi	Antwan André Patton	1975–	American rapper, songwriter and record producer (Outkast)	
Marc Bolan	Mark Feld	1947–1977	English musician, singer and songwriter (T. Rex)	
Florinda Bolkan	Florinda Soares Bulcão	1941–	Brazilian actress and model	
Tiffany Bolling	Tiffany Royce Kral	1947–	American actress, model and singer	
Michael Bolton	Michael Bolotin	1953–	American singer and songwriter	
Sheila Bond	Sheila Phyllis Berman	1927–2017	American actress and singer	
Gary U.S. Bonds	Gary Levone Anderson	1939–	American singer	
Bizzy Bone	Bryon Anthony McCane II	1976–	American rapper and singer (Bone Thugs-n-Harmony)	
Krayzie Bone	Anthony Henderson	1973–	American rapper (Bone Thugs-n-Harmony)	
Layzie Bone	Steven Howse	1975–	American rapper (Bone Thugs-n-Harmony)	
Wish Bone	Charles Scruggs	1975–	American rapper (Bone Thugs-n-Harmony)	
Shirley Bonne	Shirley Tanner	1934–	American actress	
Vivian Bonnell	Enid Mosier	1924–2003	Antiguan-American actress and singer	
Frank Bonner	Frank Woodrow Boers Jr.	1942–2021	American actor and director	
Marjorie Bonner	Marjorie Daw Collins	1893–1979	American actor and director	
Betty Boo	Alison Moira Clarkson	1970–	English singer-songwriter and rapper	
Ethel Booba	Ethyl Cayoca Gabison	1976–	Filipina actress, comedienne and television personality	
Westside Boogie	Anthony Tremaine Dixson	1989–	American rapper	
Monte Booker	Ahmanti Booker	1995–	American record producer	
Taka Boom	Yvonne Stevens	1954–	American singer	Sometimes credited as Takka Boom
Dany Boon	Daniel Farid Hamidou	1966–	French actor, film director, screenwriter and producer	
Daniel Boone	Peter Charles Green	1942–2023	English singer	
Joel Kim Booster	Kim Joonmin	1988–	American comedian and actor	Also known as Joel Alexander Kim Booster
Edwina Booth	Josephine Constance Woodruff	1904–1991	American actress	
Shirley Booth	Marjory Ford	1898–1992	American actress	Known as Thelma Ford and Thelma Booth Ford before adopting the name Shirley Booth
Gypsy Boots	Robert Bootzin	1915–2004	American fitness pioneer, actor and writer	Also known as Boots Bootzin
Ekrem Bora	Ekrem Şerif Uçak	1934–2012	Turkish actor	
Victor Borge	Børge Rosenbaum	1909–2000	Danish-American comedian, conductor and musician	
Ernest Borgnine	Ermes Effron Borgnino	1917–2012	American actor	
Yuri Borienko	Jan Bolesław Kadlubowski	1930–1999	Polish wrestler and actor	
Lyrics Born	Tsutomu William Shimura	1972–	Japanese-American rapper, singer and producer (Latyrx)	
Sean Boru	Desmond Patrick Bruen	1953–2011	Irish actor and author	
Lydia Bosch	Lydia Boquera de Buen	1963–	Spanish actress and television presenter	
Eve Boswell	Éva Keleti	1922–1998	Hungarian singer	
Barbara Bouchet	Bärbel Gutscher	1943–	German-American actress	
Ari Boulogne	Christian Aaron Päffgen	1962–2023	French photographer, actor and writer	
Jim Bowen	Peter Williams	1937–2018	English comedian, actor and television personality	Also known as James Brown Whittaker
Julie Bowen	Julie Bowen Luetkemeyer	1970–	American actress	
John Bowers	John Bowersox	1885–1936	American actor	
David Bowie	David Robert Jones	1947–2016	English singer-songwriter and actor	
Badly Drawn Boy	Damon Michael Gough	1969–	English singer-songwriter and musician	
Baker Boy	Danzal James Baker	1996–	Australian/Yolngu rapper and dancer	
Rat Boy	Jordan Cardy	1996–	English musician	
Soulja Boy	DeAndre Cortez Way	1990–	American rapper	
Betty Boyd	Elizabeth Boyd Smith	1908–1971	American actress	
Gordon Boyd	Gordon William Needham	1922–2009	English actor	
Margot Boyd	Beryl Billings	1913–2008	English actress	
Cola Boyy	Matthew Joseph Urango	1990–2024	American musician	
Yuri Bradac	Jurij Bradač	1973–	Slovenian actor and model	
Jesse Bradford	Jesse Bradford Watrouse	1979–	American actor	
Scott Brady	Gerard Kenneth Tierney	1924–1985	American actor	
Eric Braeden	Hans-Jörg Gudegast	1941–	German-American actor	
Billy Bragg	Stephen William Bragg	1957–	English singer, songwriter, musician, author and political activist	
Jolene Brand	Jolene Marie Bufkin	N/A	American actress	
Henry Brandon	Heinrich von Kleinbach	1912–1990	German-American actor	
Michael Brandon	Michael Feldman	1945–	American actor	
Marianne Brandt	Marie Bischof	1842–1921	Austrian opera singer	
Mike Brant	Moshe Michael Brand	1947–1975	Israeli singer-songwriter	
Keefe Brasselle	Henry Keefe Brassil	1923–1981	American actor, producer and author	
Da Brat	Shawntae Harris	1974–	American rapper	
Creed Bratton	William Charles Schneider	1943–	American actor	
Fanny Brice	Fania Borach	1891–1951	American comedian, model, singer and actress	
Lew Brice	Louis Borach	1893–1966	American actor, dancer and comedian	
May Britt	Maj-Britt Wilkens	1934–2025	Swedish actress	
Pamela Britton	Armilda Jane Owens	1923–1974	American actress	
Steve Brodie	John Daugherty Stephens	1919–1992	American actor	
Albert Brooks	Albert Lawrence Einstein	1947–	American actor, director and screenwriter	
Geraldine Brooks	Geraldine Stroock	1925–1977	American actress	
Hildy Brooks	Hilda Blumgold	1934–	American actress	Also known as Hilda Brawner
Big Bill Broonzy	Lee Conley Bradley	1893/1903–1958	American singer-songwriter	Later known as William Lee Broonzy
Faith Brown	Eunice Irene Carroll	1944–	English actress and comedienne	
Foxy Brown	Inga Elizabeth DeCarlo Fung Marchand	1978–	American rapper	
Georgia Brown	Lilian Claire Klot	1933–1992	English and American singer and actress	
Michael Brown	Michael David Lookofsky	1949–2015	American musician (The Left Banke)	
Roy Chubby Brown	Royston Vasey	1945–	English comedian	
Susan Browning	Susan Brown	1941–2006	American actress	
Carol Bruce	Shirley Levy	1919–2007	American actress and singer	
Lenny Bruce	Leonard Alfred Schneider	1925–1966	American comedian and actor	
Virginia Bruce	Helen Virginia Briggs	1910–1982	American actress	
Patrick Bruel	Patrick Benguigui	1959–	French singer-songwriter, actor and professional poker player	
Nicette Bruno	Nicette Bruno Xavier	1933–2020	Brazilian actress	
Dora Bryan	Dora Broadbent	1923–2014	English actress	
Sabrina Bryan	Reba Hinojosa	1984–	American dancer, actress and singer (The Cheetah Girls)	
Rob Brydon	Robert Jones	1965–	Welsh actor, comedian, impressionist, presenter, singer and writer	
Delme Bryn-Jones	Delme Jones	1934–2001	Welsh singer	
Barbara Bryne	Barbara Isabel Birkinshaw	1929–2023	British-American actress	
Young Buck	David Darnell Brown	1981–	American rapper (G-Unit)	
Papa Bue	Arne Bue Jensen	1930–2011	Danish musician and bandleader	
Jake Bugg	Jake Edwin Charles Kennedy	1994–	English singer-songwriter	
Bad Bunny	Benito Martínez Ocasio	1994–	Puerto Rican rapper and singer	
Clem Burke	Clement Anthony Bozewski	1954–	American musician (Blondie)	
George Burns	Nathan Birnbaum	1896–1996	American comedian and actor	
Boz Burrell	Raymond Burrell	1946–2006	English bass guitarist	
Ellen Burstyn	Edna Rae Gillooly	1932–	American actress	
Corey Burton	Corey Weinberg	1955–	American actor	
Iris Burton	Iris Burstein	1930–2008	American singer	
Richard Burton	Richard Walter Jenkins Jr.	1925–1984	Welsh actor	
Dolly Buster	Katerina Bochníková	1969–	Czech-German actress	
Prince Buster	Cecil Bustamente Campbell	1938–2016	Jamaican singer-songwriter	
Jerry Butler	Paul David Siederman	1959–2018	American actor	
Red Buttons	Aaron Chwatt	1919–2006	American actor and comedian	
Seymore Butts	Adam Glasser	1964–	American pornographic film director	
Jean Byron	Imogene Audette Burkhart	1925–2006	American actress	Also known as Jean Audette and Jean Burkhart early in her career
Jeffrey Byron	Timothy Paul Stafford	1955–	American actor and writer	
Kathleen Byron	Kathleen Elizabeth Fell	1921–2009	English actress	
Marion Byron	Miriam Bilenkin	1911–1985	American comedienne and actress	
