= Melodije Istre i Kvarnera =

Croatian music festival

- Genre: Pop music, Folk music, rock music etc.
- Dates: May, June
- Locations: Various towns and municipalities across the Istria, Primorje-Gorski Kotar and Lika-Senj counties
- Years active: 1964 – present
- Website: Official website

Melodije Istre i Kvarnera (in English: Melodies of Istria and Kvarner) is a Croatian song contest, held annually in multiple towns in the Istria, Primorje-Gorski Kotar and Lika-Senj counties. It consists of a competition amongst previously unreleased songs.

The first edition of Melodije Istre i Kvarnera (then Melodije Kvarnera - Rijeka 1964), held on 22 May 1964, was broadcast by Radio Zagreb (due to the local radio station, Radio Rijeka, boycotting the festival) and it had 14 artists participating with 18 songs. Ana Štefok won the first edition with her song "Nade" receiving 557 points from the public.

== Winners ==
=== Public's Choice ===
==== 1960s ====
List of winners of Melodije Istre i Kvarnera with the title of the performed song and its composers
Year	Song	Artist(s)
1964	"Nade" (Ivo Kustan, Blanka Chudoba)	Ana Štefok
1965	"Ostani tu" (Zvonimir Golov)	Arsen Dedić
1966	"Bokaleta" (Nello Milotti, Boško Obradović)	Ira Kraljić & Dinko Banić
1967	"Otišal je opet brodit" (Ljubo Kuntarić, Blanka Chudoba)	Ira Kraljić
1968	"Urinjska baklja" (Nello Milotti, Marijan Fištrović)	Toni Kljaković
1969	"Samanj" (Nello Milotti, Ante Tonković)	Toni Kljaković & Tomislav Borić

==== 1970s ====
List of winners of Melodije Istre i Kvarnera with the title of the performed song and its composers
Year	Song	Artist(s)
1970	"Kartulina z Kraljevice" (Nello Milotti, Ljubo Pavešić)	Tomislav Borić & Toni Kljaković
1971	"Ognjišće" (Adela Dobrić, David Kabalin)	Toni Kljaković
1972	"Kupil san ti prstenac" (Bogdan Sepčić, Čedomil Variola)	Mirko Cetinski
1973	"Tršački prošijani" (Nello Milotti, Ljubo Pavešić)	Toni Kljaković & Vokalni kvarter Rivijera
1974	"Lipo j' vino pit, ma još je lipše neč" (Aldo Galeazzi)	Aldo Galeazzi & Vokalni ansambl Rivijera
1975	"Nebuloza" (Nello Milotti, Ljubo Pavešić)	Toni Kljaković
1976	"Nevera s Kvarnera" (Nello Milotti, Marijan Fištrović)	Milka Čakarun-Lenac & Grupa 777
1977	"Bulin" (Andrej Baša, Zvonko Turak)	Betty Jurković
1978	"Ča smo mi" (Aldo Galeazzi)	Milka Čakarun-Lenac & Aldo Galeazzi
1979	"Stara pojka" (Andrej Baša, Zvonko Turak)	Aldo Galeazzi

==== 1980s ====
List of winners of Melodije Istre i Kvarnera with the title of the performed song and its composers
Year	Song	Artist(s)
1980	"Preša"" (Miroslav Paškvan, Rudolf Kučić)	Miroslav Paškvan
1981	"Andemo in barca" (Angelo Miroslav Vlatković, Mario Kinel)	Ljiljana Budičin-Manestar & Angelo Tarticchio
1982	"Svati" (Andrej Baša, Ljubica Bestulić Stanković)	Betty Jurković
1983	"Con lui in motocicleta" (Andrej Baša, Mario Kinel)	Lidija Percan
1984	"Kanat od vina" (Nello Milotti, Daniel Načinović)	Vesna Nežić Ružić
1985	"Spomen na ćaću" (Josip Vuk)	Toni Kljaković
1986	"Boćar" (Nello Milotti, Daniel Načinović)	Ira Kraljić & Aldo Galeazzi

==== 1990s ====
List of winners of Melodije Istre i Kvarnera with the title of the performed song and its composers
Year	Song	Artist(s)
1993	"Adio bionda" (Đani Maršan)	Đani Maršan i Mirko Cetinski
1994	"E la barca va" (Đani Maršan)	Đani Maršan & Darko Štifanić
1995	"Samo Bog te moga učiniti" (Livio Morosin)	Alen Vitasović
1996	"Bracolet" (Ivica Badurina, Vlasta Juretić)	Radojka Šverko
1997	"Plače stara lesa" (Ivica Frleta, Mirjana Bobuš)	Radojka Šverko
1998	"Kad san ti bila" (Igor Lesica, Zlatan Marunić)	Radojka Šverko
1999	"Neka jubav moja sa" (Robert Grubišić, Mirjana Bobuš)	Karin Kuljanić

==== 2000s ====
List of winners of Melodije Istre i Kvarnera with the title of the performed song and its composers
Year	Song	Artist(s)
2000	"Grdovići ribari" (Mladen Grdović, Robert Pilepić, Neno Ninčević)	Mladen Grdović
2002	"Večeri boje naranče" (Vinko Škaron, Vlasta Juretić)	Karin Kuljanić & Đani Maršan
2003	"Da mi je s tobun prošećat" (Andrej Baša, Rober Pilepić)	Gina Picinić
2004	"Tribalo bi zakantat" (Mirjana Bobuš)	Karin Kuljanić & Mirjana Bobuš
2005	"Za te rojena" (Robert Grubišić, Mirjana Bobuš)	Karin Kuljanić
2006	"Prošeći se z manun po Kvarneru" (Robert Grubišić, Mirjana Bobuš)	Voljen Grbac, Mirko Cetinski & Joso Butorac
2007	"Barka lipog imena" (Andrej Baša)	Gina Picinić
2008	"Prihajan doma" (Robert Grubišić, Zvonko Turak, Mario Lipovšek)	Mario Battifiaca & Klapa Sol
2009	"Kvarneriana" (Robert Grubišić, Mirjana Bobuš, Voljen Grbac)	Vivien Galletta & Voljen Grbac

==== 2010s ====
List of winners of Melodije Istre i Kvarnera with the title of the performed song and its composers
Year	Song	Artist(s)
2010	"Boduli su duša od Kvarnera" (Branko Barbir)	Klapa Sol
2011	"Črna" (Ines Prajo, Arijana Kunštek)	Alen Polić & ansambl Kaljina
2012	"Dalmacija di Kvarner bušiva" (Branko Barbir)	Klapa Sol
2013	"Ma ši te ki ča za me pita" (Andrej Baša)	Gina Picinić
2014	"Molitva za te" (Mirjana Bobuš)	Mirjana Bobuš
2015	"Tu san rojen" (Robert Grubišić, Robert Pilepić)	Voljen Grbac & Joso Butorac
2016	"Ružica" (Robert Grubišić, Zlatan Marunić)	Joso Butorac
2017	"Živet će vavik naša beseda" (Robert Pilepić, Voljen Grbac)	Joso Butorac, Voljen Grbac & Edi Šegota
2018	"Mama fala ti" (Robert Grubišić, Robert Pilepić)	Voljen Grbac & Matej Prpić
2019	"Primorska arija" (Andrina Frleta, Frane Frleta, Suzana Blečić)	Joso Butorac

==== 2020s ====
List of winners of Melodije Istre i Kvarnera with the title of the performed song and its composers
Year	Song	Artist(s)
2020	"Fala ti ča si blizu" (Roberta Pilepić, Goran Šarac, Aleksandar Valenčić)	Tedi Grubica
2021	"Da bimo i k letu" (Robert Pilepić, Mauro Staraj)	Nevia Rigutto, Duško Jeličić, Tamara Brusić & Mauro Staraj
2022	"Fala ti na jubavi" (Robert Pilepić, Goran Šarac, Aleksandar Valenčić)	Karin Kuljanić
2023	"Suza s Kvarnera" (Robert Grubišić, Zlatan Marunić)	Voljen Grbac, Joso Butorac & klapa Tić
2024	"Tri mladića" (Robert Pilepić, Robert Grubišić)	Dino Guščić, Matej Plavček & Jure Kaurloto

=== Critic's Choice ===
==== 1990s ====
List of the Critic's Choice winners of Melodije Istre i Kvarnera with the title of the performed song and its composers
Year	Song	Artist(s)
1995	"Va dihe mora" (Aleksandar Valenčić, Vjekoslav Alilović)	Radojka Šverko & Klapa Luka
1996	"Bracolet" (Ivica Badurina, Vlasta Juretić)	Radojka Šverko
1997	"Nišan znal" (V. Knežević)	Dado Topić
1998	"Pada daž" (Đorđe Novković, Ljubica Bestulić Stanković)	Vesna Nežić Ružić & Sergio Pavat
1999	"Konji na vitru" (E. Bosazzi, Daniel Načinović)	Highlanders

==== 2020s ====
List of the Critic's Choice winners of Melodije Istre i Kvarnera with the title of the performed song and its composers
Year	Song	Artist(s)
2020	"Tu ostani" (Daniel Moscarda)	Daniel Moscarda
2021	"Fermaj se malo" (Daniel Moscarda)	Daniel Moscarda & Alen Vitasović
2022	"Cviće od brnistre" (Bruno Krajcar, Saša Matovina, Daniel Načinović, Ivo Popeskić)	Klapa Kastav
2023	"Bit ćeš se moje" (Nataša Klarić, Branka Kržik Longin)	Božidarka Matija Čerina & ž.v.s. Luštrin
2024	"Noć" (Lara Pilepić, Ljubica Bestulić Stanković)	Nevia Rigutto & Darko Jurković
