= Šverko =

Šverko is a Serbo-Croatian surname. Notable people with the surname include:

- Marin Šverko (born 1998), Croatian footballer
- Radojka Šverko (born 1948), Croatian singer-songwriter
- Walter Sverko (born 1974) Croatian Engineer and Creative born in Canada
