= Melodije Istre i Kvarnera 2022 =

Croatian song contest

Dates and venue
- Semi-final 1: 22 June 2022
- Semi-final 2: 23 June 2022
- Semi-final 3: 24 June 2022
- Final: 25 June 2022
- Venue: Kastav, Malinska and Rijeka

Organisation
- Broadcaster: HRT, HR Pula, HR Rijeka
- Artistic director: Andrej Baša
- Presenters: Robert Ferlin, Mario Battifiaca and Uršula Tolj

Participants
- Number of entries: 19

Vote
- Voting system: Ballot vote, professional jury
- Winning song: Karin Kuljanić "Fala ti na jubavi"

The Melodije Istre i Kvarnera 2022 was the 52nd edition of the annual Melodije Istre i Kvarnera, a song contest held annually in multiple towns in the Primorje-Gorski Kotar county of Croatia. The show was held between 22 and 25 June 2022, and presented by Robert Ferlin, Mario Battifiaca and Uršula Tolj. Andrej Baša served as the artistic director for the competition.

== Format ==
The 2022 edition of the Melodije Istre i Kvarnera festival had three host cities/munincipalities; Kastav, Malinska and Rijeka. The three host cities held four nights with Rijeka hosting the last two shows with the grand final. The artistic director for the competition was Andrej Baša.

Each of the ticket holders for the live shows received a voting ballot where they could cast their votes for the main public's award. Each night, after all performances, the top three placed songs of the current show were revealed with the general ranking winner being announced on the last night in Rijeka.

On 7 April 2022, all competing entries and host cities were revealed. The main show consisted of 19 competing entries, all of them were sung in Croatian (mainly in the Chakavian dialect).

=== Awards ===
Additional to the main award, these awards were given out:

- Best Newcomer
- Critic's Choice
- Čakavski Sabor Award for Best Lyrics
- "Nello Milotti" Award for Best Traditional Production
- Novi list "Beseda" Award
- Online Voting Award
- Radio Istra Award for Best Song Production
- Radio Rijeka Award for Best Vocal Performance

== Competing entries ==
Competing songs and artists, showing writers and results achieved
Song, performing artist(s) and writer(s)	Rank	Other Melodije Istre i Kvarnera Awards
"Fala ti na jubavi" – Karin Kuljanić (Goran Šarac, Robert Pilepić)	1	None
"Srce je srićno" – klapa Tić (Robert Grubišić, Vjeko Alilović)	2	None
"Kvarnerska vila" – Andrina Frleta (Robert Grubišić, Mirjana Bobuš)	3	Čakavski Sabor Award for Best Lyrics; Radio Rijeka Award for Best Vocal Performance
"3. Maj" – Daniel Moscarda (Daniel Moscarda)	—N/a	Critic's Choice second place
"Blue Eyed Swing" – Daniel Načinović (Daniel Načinović, Josip Vuk)	—N/a	None
"Cviće od brnistre" – klapa Kastav (Bruno Krajcar, Daniel Načinović)	—N/a	Critic's Choice winner
"Još duraju naše cime" – Joso Butorac (Robert Grubišić, Zlatan Marunić)	—N/a	None
"Laku noć, Kostreno" – Božidarka Matija Čerina i ž. v. s. Luštrin (Andrej Babić, Branka Kržik Longin)	—N/a	Critic's Choice third place
"Mene zove svet" – Dino Guščić (Suzana Matušan Avgustini, Suzana Blečić)	—N/a	None
"Naš jure" – Erik Balija (Erik Balija, Ljubica Bestulić Stanković)	—N/a	None
"Nisan znala reć volin te" – Lorenza Puhar (Alfred Šaina)	—N/a	None
"O, moj cvite" – Tereza Kesovija (Andrej Baša, Daniel Načinović)	—N/a	Online Voting Award
"Od Istre do Prevlake" – Mladen Grdović (Viktor Jerić, Nikka Car)	—N/a	None
"Raj, raj, raj" – Tea Vučak (Tea Vučak)	—N/a	None
"Srića put do srca zna" – Suzana Štefanić & Dario Terglav (Suzana Matušan Avgustini, Robert Pilepić)	—N/a	None
"Sunny, sunny, sole, sole" – Nikolina Tomljanović (Robert Pilepić, Lara Pilepić)	—N/a	None
"Šterna" – Lucija Rajnović (Aleksandar Valenčić, Suzana Blečić)	—N/a	Best Newcomer
"To jubav je" – Martina Majerle (Robert Grubišić, Vjeko Alilović)	—N/a	None
"Vanka je škuro" – Lado Bartoniček (Lado Bartoniček)	—N/a	"Nello Milotti" Award for Best Traditional Production; Novi list "Beseda" Award; Radio Istra Award for Best Song Production

== Shows ==
=== First night ===
The first show was held in Kastav.

First night: 22 June 2022
Draw	Artist	Song	Ballot vote ranking				
Draw	Artist	Song	Ballot vote ranking	1	Dino Guščić	"Mene zove svet"	—
2	Lucija Rajnović	"Šterna"	—				
3	Suzana Štefanić & Dario Terglav	"Srića put do srca zna"	—				
4	Tea Vučak	"Raj, raj, raj"	—				
5	klapa Kastav	"Cviće od brnistre"	—				
6	Lorenza Puhar	"Nisan znala reć volin te"	—				
7	Božidarka Matija Čerina i ž. v. s. Luštrin	"Laku noć, Kostreno"	—				
8	klapa Tić	"Srce je srićno"	2				
9	Lado Bartoniček	"Vanka je škuro"	—				
10	Andrina Frleta	"Kvarnerska vila"	3				
11	Joso Butorac	"Još duraju naše cime"	—				
12	Nikolina Tomljanović	"Sunny, sunny, sole, sole"	—				
13	Daniel Načinović	"Blue Eyed Swing"	—				
14	Erik Balija	"Naš jure"	—				
15	Mladen Grdović	"Od Istre do Prevlake"	—				
16	Daniel Moscarda	"3. Maj"	—				
17	Martina Majerle	"To jubav je"	—				
18	Karin Kuljanić	"Fala ti na jubavi"	1				
19	Tereza Kesovija	"O, moj cvite"	—				

=== Second night ===
The second show was held in Malinska.

Second night: 23 June 2022
Draw	Artist	Song	Ballot vote ranking	Updated general ranking					
Draw	Artist	Song	Ballot vote ranking	Updated general ranking	1	Dino Guščić	"Mene zove svet"	—	—
2	Lucija Rajnović	"Šterna"	—	—					
3	Suzana Štefanić & Dario Terglav	"Srića put do srca zna"	—	—					
4	Tea Vučak	"Raj, raj, raj"	—	—					
5	klapa Kastav	"Cviće od brnistre"	—	—					
6	Lorenza Puhar	"Nisan znala reć volin te"	—	—					
7	Božidarka Matija Čerina i ž. v. s. Luštrin	"Laku noć, Kostreno"	—	—					
8	klapa Tić	"Srce je srićno"	2	2					
9	Lado Bartoniček	"Vanka je škuro"	—	—					
10	Andrina Frleta	"Kvarnerska vila"	3	3					
11	Joso Butorac	"Još duraju naše cime"	—	—					
12	Nikolina Tomljanović	"Sunny, sunny, sole, sole"	—	—					
13	Daniel Načinović	"Blue Eyed Swing"	—	—					
14	Erik Balija	"Naš jure"	—	—					
15	Mladen Grdović	"Od Istre do Prevlake"	—	—					
16	Daniel Moscarda	"3. Maj"	—	—					
17	Martina Majerle	"To jubav je"	—	—					
18	Karin Kuljanić	"Fala ti na jubavi"	1	1					
19	Tereza Kesovija	"O, moj cvite"	—	—					

=== Third night ===
The third night was held in Rijeka. It served as a main dress rehearsal prior to the final thus no voting occurred.

Third night: 24 June 2022
Draw	Artist	Song			
Draw	Artist	Song	1	Dino Guščić	"Mene zove svet"
2	Lucija Rajnović	"Šterna"			
3	Suzana Štefanić & Dario Terglav	"Srića put do srca zna"			
4	Tea Vučak	"Raj, raj, raj"			
5	klapa Kastav	"Cviće od brnistre"			
6	Lorenza Puhar	"Nisan znala reć volin te"			
7	Božidarka Matija Čerina i ž. v. s. Luštrin	"Laku noć, Kostreno"			
8	klapa Tić	"Srce je srićno"			
9	Lado Bartoniček	"Vanka je škuro"			
10	Andrina Frleta	"Kvarnerska vila"			
11	Joso Butorac	"Još duraju naše cime"			
12	Nikolina Tomljanović	"Sunny, sunny, sole, sole"			
13	Daniel Načinović	"Blue Eyed Swing"			
14	Erik Balija	"Naš jure"			
15	Mladen Grdović	"Od Istre do Prevlake"			
16	Daniel Moscarda	"3. Maj"			
17	Martina Majerle	"To jubav je"			
18	Karin Kuljanić	"Fala ti na jubavi"			
19	Tereza Kesovija	"O, moj cvite"			

=== Fourth night ===
The fourth and final night was held in Rijeka.

Fifth night: 25 June 2023
Draw	Artist	Song	Ballot vote ranking	Final general ranking					
Draw	Artist	Song	Ballot vote ranking	Final general ranking	1	Dino Guščić	"Mene zove svet"	—	—
2	Lucija Rajnović	"Šterna"	—	—					
3	Suzana Štefanić & Dario Terglav	"Srića put do srca zna"	—	—					
4	Tea Vučak	"Raj, raj, raj"	—	—					
5	klapa Kastav	"Cviće od brnistre"	—	—					
6	Lorenza Puhar	"Nisan znala reć volin te"	—	—					
7	Božidarka Matija Čerina i ž. v. s. Luštrin	"Laku noć, Kostreno"	—	—					
8	klapa Tić	"Srce je srićno"	2	2					
9	Lado Bartoniček	"Vanka je škuro"	—	—					
10	Andrina Frleta	"Kvarnerska vila"	—	3					
11	Joso Butorac	"Još duraju naše cime"	3	—					
12	Nikolina Tomljanović	"Sunny, sunny, sole, sole"	—	—					
13	Daniel Načinović	"Blue Eyed Swing"	—	—					
14	Erik Balija	"Naš jure"	—	—					
15	Daniel Moscarda	"3. Maj"	—	—					
16	Martina Majerle	"To jubav je"	—	—					
17	Karin Kuljanić	"Fala ti na jubavi"	1	1					
18	Tereza Kesovija	"O, moj cvite"	—	—					
—N/a (Note: Due to being alcoholised Mladen Grdović did not perform his entry "Od Istre do Prevlake" in the final.)	Mladen Grdović	"Od Istre do Prevlake"	—	—					

== Special guests ==
The special guests of Melodije Istre i Kvarnera 2023 included:

- Singers / musicians: Erik Balija, Lado Bartoniček, Tamara Brusić, Božidarka Matija Čerina, Andrina Frleta, Mladen Grdović, Duško Jeličić, Martina Majerle, Đani Maršan, Daniel Moscarda, Nevia Rigutto, Mauro Staraj and klapa Tić
- Politicians: Mayor of Kastav Matej Mostarac, mayor of Malinska Robert Anton and the mayor of Rijeka Goran Palčevski.
