= Ivo Gamulin Gianni =

Ivo Gamulin Gianni is a Croatian theatrical and television performer and singer.

== Early life and education ==
He was born in the town of Jelsa on the island of Hvar. As the youngest of five brothers, he spent his childhood in a warm community with his parents, father Gianni and mother Margarita, who published a book of poems in čakavština dialect. As a 5-year-old child, on Christmas Eve, Gianni was introduced to his first microphone and climbed onto a stage of the local church, performing a song composed by his mother.

In 1989, he arrived at Zagreb and enrolled in the University of Theology.

== Musical career ==
=== Choral music ===
Six years later Gianni founded a vocal ensemble klapa “Jelsa” and recorded two albums with them. Later that year Gianni attended an audition for the Croatian National Theater’s choir, which resulted in permanent engagement. At Varaždin Baroque Nights he had many performances: Vivaldi's SPIRITUAL MUSIC with Slovenian chamber choir and Slovenian philharmonic, Musaical Scenographic Overview from the Opus of J. Bajamonti with Split chamber orchestra and festival choir, as well as the world premiere of Cavalli's opera Pompeo Magno directed by Paul Eastwood. He appeared alongside Slovenian chamber choir in the performance of Croatian Mass by Boris Papandopulo. Together with the choir, Gianni also recorded an album.

Collaboration with various ensembles continued, whereas his performances were accompanied by the Slovenian philharmonic in Ljubljana, Križevci, Varaždin and Požega, the Symphonic orchestra of RTV Slovenia, the Croatian Radio Television choir, the Croatian National Theatre choir from Rijeka in Beethoven's 9th Symphony and the Chamber orchestra in Mozart's Requiem.

In collaboration with the symphonic orchestra and Croatian Radio Television choir he appeared in: Animal Farm and Glagolitic Requiem (I. Kuljerić), PETAR SVAČIĆ (J. Gotovac), Porin (V. Lisinski), Vukovar Requiem (D. Bobić), Pozdrav Svijetu (M. Kelemen), Muka Gospodina NAŠEGA Isusa Krista (B. Papandopulo), Misa Solemnis (L. Ebner), Misa Solemnis in C (J. P. Haibel), Krunidbena Misa (W.A. Mozart) and Stihovi Pokajanja (A. Schnittke).

=== Opera ===
Cooperation with a vocal coach, professor Stojan Stojanov, resulted in his first solo opera engagement in 'La Traviata', an opportunity offered by the Opera Director at the time, Maestro Vladimir Kranjčević.

Ever since 2001, Ivo Gamulin has made noteworthy appearances in many operas staged at the Croatian National Theater: La Traviata, Aida, Don Carlos, Rigoletto, Nabucco, Simon Bocanegra (G. Verdi), PLAŠT (G. Puccini), Boris Godunov (M. P. Musorgski), Tristan I Izolda (R. Wagner), West Side Story (L. Bernstein), KORIOLAN (S. Šulek

At 3rd International Tenor Competition in Trogir Gianni won the third prize and in 2005 he was nominated for the Croatian Acting Guild prize for the role of Ismaile in NABUCCO (G. Verdi) and a young sailor in TRISTAN AND ISEULT (R. Wagner).

=== Pop ===
He presented himself to a wider audience in 2007 with an album released by Dallas Records Ljubav to si ti, incorporating pop songs into it. Ever since then the tenor achieved a series of notable performances in Croatia and neighboring countries.

=== Collaboration ===
Gianni has been performing alongside big names in Croatian music, such as: Tereza Kesovija, Radojka Šverko, Doris Dragović, Maja Blagdan and others. As for international singers, he continuously collaborates with the Slovenian singer Helena Blagne and the Macedonian singer Kaliopi. In the year of 2009 Gianni held a gala benefit concert at Vatroslav Lisinski Concert Hall with the Revue Orchestra of the Zagreb Philharmonic. The exclusive guest of the concert was a celebrated Italian diva Anna Oxa. In the summer of 2010 Gianni had an honor to perform at the shows of the great American singer Natalie Cole in Croatia as an exclusive guest of her entire European tour.

Apart from numerous collaborations with both Croatian and international stars, together with Dallas records Gianni has recorded a Christmas album called Božićna priča, which has been released in December 2010 and contains a duet with an American music icon Gloria Gaynor, accompanied by the Symphonic Orchestra of Croatian Radio Television. All songs were arranged by the composer John Cameron.
