= Nina Donelli =

Slovenian singer

- Also known as: Nina
- Born: Nina Vodušek; 10 September 1997 (age 28); Poljčane, Slovenia
- Genres: Pop
- Occupation: Singer
- Instrument: Vocals
- Years active: 2014–present
- Label: Croatia Records

Nina Vodušek (born 9 October 1997), known professionally as Nina Donelli, is a Slovenian singer.

== Music career ==
In early 2014, Donelli signed a publishing deal with Serbian songwriter Dušan Bačić and released her debut single in Croatian, titled "Zašto cure boli glava" (Why Girls Have a Headache). Her debut album Glazba, ljubav, život (Music, Love, Life) was released on 17 January 2017 through Croatia Records.

== Discography ==
=== Albums ===
- Glazba, ljubav, život (2017)

=== Singles ===
Title	Year	Peak chart positions	Album
Title	Year	CRO	Album
"Zašto cure boli glava"	2014	—	Glazba, ljubav, život
"Nina zovu me"	2015	—	Glazba, ljubav, život
"Šalajdalaj"	2016	—	Glazba, ljubav, život
"Moje tijelo"	2016	—	Glazba, ljubav, život
"Zapalit ću klub"	2016	—	Glazba, ljubav, život
"Primitivac negativac"	2016	—	Glazba, ljubav, život
"Ako ako"	2017	—	Non-album single
"Propala veza"	2017	—	Glazba, ljubav, život
"Božić je tu"	2017	—	Glazba, ljubav, život
"Na moj rođendan"	2017	—	Glazba, ljubav, život
"Glumica"	2017	—	Non-album singles
"Luda večer" (with Milo Stavros)	2018	—	Non-album singles
"Dalmatino"	2018	—	Non-album singles
"Ljubav nema kraj"	2018	—	Non-album singles
"Jaka sam žena" (with DJ Dady)	2019	—	Non-album singles
"Genijalno" (with Tarapana Band)	2019	9	Non-album singles
"Mili"	2019	39	Non-album singles
