= Antonela Đinđić =

- Also known as: Nela
- Born: Antonela Đinđić; Zagreb, Croatia
- Genres: Pop
- Occupation: Singer
- Instruments: Vocals, piano
- Years active: 2015–present
- Label: Croatia Records

Antonela Đinđić, known professionally as Nela, is a Croatian singer and songwriter. She rose to fame by participating in the first season of The Voice – Najljepši glas Hrvatske. Đinđić is most known for her collaboration with Marko Kutlić on the song "U zagrljaju spašeni".

== Life and career ==
In late 2017 Đinđić released her first single titled "Netko kao ti". "Vrijeme je" was released as her second single and became her first song to chart in the Croatian HR Top 40 chart.

== Personal life ==
Đinđić was in a relationship with Croatian singer Marko Kutlić.

== Discography ==
=== Studio albums ===
Title	Details	Peak chart positions
Title	Details	CRO
Melodrama	Released: 4 June 2021; Label: Croatia Records; Formats: Digital download, streaming	7
Arhivirano	Released: 16 October 2025; Label: Croatia Records; Formats: Digital download, streaming	

=== Singles ===
Title	Year	Peak chart positions	Album
Title	Year	CRO	Album
"Netko kao ti"	2017	—	Melodrama
"Vrijeme je"	2018	12	Melodrama
"Poslije kiše"	2018	39	Melodrama
"U zagrljaju spašeni" (with Marko Kutlić)	2019	2	Melodrama
"Nauči me ploviti"	2019	—	Melodrama
"Neke ljubavi"	2019	20	Melodrama
"Melodrama"	2020	11	Melodrama
"Ono što ostaje"	2021	8	Melodrama
"Nek ti bude kao meni"	2021	23	Melodrama
"Problem"	2022	4	Melodrama
"Dobro jutro, Božić je"	2022	1	Single
"Nebo gori"	2023	21	Arhivirano
"Nepokoriva"	2023	9	Arhivirano
"Mogu i sama" with Nika Turković	2024	7	Arhivirano
"Baš sad"	2025	8	Arhivirano
"Ralje"	2025	8	Arhivirano
"—" denotes a single that did not chart or was not released.

== Awards and nominations ==
Year	Association	Category	Nominee / work	Result	Ref.
2022	Porin	Best New Artist	Herself	Nominated	
