= Melodije Istre i Kvarnera 2023 =

Croatian song contest

Dates
- Semi-final 1: 19 June 2023
- Semi-final 2: 20 June 2023
- Semi-final 3: 21 June 2023
- Semi-final 4: 23 June 2023
- Final: 24 June 2023

Host
- Venue: Opatija, Rijeka, Barban and Krk
- Presenter(s): Lena Stojiljković and Borna Šmer.
- Artistic director: Andrej Baša
- Host broadcaster: HRT, HR Pula, HR Rijeka

Participants
- Number of entries: 18

Vote
- Voting system: Ballot vote, professional jury
- Winning song: Voljen Grbac, Joso Butorac & klapa Tić "Suza s Kvarnera"

The Melodije Istre i Kvarnera 2023 was the 53rd edition of the annual Melodije Istre i Kvarnera, a song contest held annually in multiple towns in the Istria and Primorje-Gorski Kotar counties of Croatia. The show was held between 19 and 24 June 2023, and presented by Lena Stojiljković and Borna Šmer. Andrej Baša served as the artistic director for the competition.

== Format ==
The 2023 edition of the Melodije Istre i Kvarnera festival had four host cities/munincipalities; Opatija, Rijeka, Barban and Krk. The four host cities would organize five nights with Krk hosting the last two shows with the grand final. The artistic director for the competition was Andrej Baša.

Each of the ticket holders for the live shows received a voting ballot where they could cast their votes for the main public's award. Each night, after all performances, the top 3 placed songs of the current show were revealed with the general ranking winner being announced on the last night in Krk.

On 27 March 2023, all competing entries and host cities were revealed. The main show consisted of 18 competing entries. 17 of them were sung in Croatian (mainly in the Chakavian dialect) and one entry had its lyrics in Italian.

=== Awards ===
Additional to the main award, these awards were given out:

- Best New Artist
- Critic's Choice
- Čakavski Sabor Award for Best Lyrics
- "Nello Milotti" Award for Best Traditional Production
- Radio Istra Award for Best Song Production
- Radio Rijeka Award for Best Vocal Performance

== Competing entries ==
Competing songs and artists, showing writers and results achieved
Song, performing artist(s) and writer(s)	Rank	Other Melodije Istre i Kvarnera Awards
"Suza s Kvarnera" – Voljen Grbac, Joso Butorac & klapa Tić (Robert Grubišić, Zlatan Marunić)	1	None
"Ženske za feštu" – Tamara Brusić i ženska klapa Hreljin (Lara Pilepić, Robert Pilepić)	2	None
"Pod ruku me ćapaj" – Nevia Rigutto & Duško Jeličić (Duško Rapotec Ute - Robert Pilepić)	3	None
"Bit ćeš se moje" – Božidarka Matija Čerina & ž.v.s. Luštrin (Nataša Klarić, Branka Kržik Longin)	—	Critic's Choice winner
"Guštan more" – Melanija (Robert Grubišić, Mirjana Bobuš)	—	None
"Istria mia" – Eleonora Dobrović & Luka Brgić (Lado Bartoniček)	—	Best New Artist; Critic's Choice second place
"Kožna jaketa" – Kožne jakne (Igor Lesica, Teo Kažoki)	—	None
"Kokodak" – ženska klapa Hreljin (Andrej Baša)	—	None
"Kažuni" – Marinella (Bruno Krajcar, Slavica Lončarić)	—	None
"Leta su pasala" – Katja Budimčić Sabljar (Aleksandar Valenčić, Suzana Blečić)	—	Radio Rijeka Award for Best Vocal Performance
"Ja bin jopet bija njen" – Lado Bartoniček (Lado Bartoniček)	—	None
"Metal je ča!" – Po' metra crijeva (Hrvoje Karabaić)	—	"Nello Milotti" Award for Best Traditional Song Production
"Na vrh Učke" – Matej Plavček & Maja Miljavac (Robert Grubišić, Robert Pilepić)	—	None
"Na škaline" – Daniel Moscarda (Daniel Moscarda)	—	None
"On ni doša" – Alen Vitasović (Lara Pilepić, Robert Pilepić, Ljubica Bestulić Stanković)	—	Radio Istra Award for Best Song Production; Critic's Choice third place
"Porat ud neba" – Erik Balija (Toni Pernić)	—	Čakavski Sabor Award for Best Lyrics
"Sad razumin" – Dino Guščić (Aleksandar Valenčić, Snježana Perić)	—	None
"Zavavik tu" – ženska klapa Vejanke (Aleksandar Valenčić, Suzana Blečić)	—	None

== Shows ==
=== First night ===
The first show was held in Opatija.

First night: 19 June 2023
Draw	Artist	Song	Ballot vote ranking				
Draw	Artist	Song	Ballot vote ranking	1	ženska klapa Vejanke	"Zavavik tu"	—
2	Matej Plavček & Maja Miljavac	"Na vrh Učke"	—				
3	Eleonora Dobrović & Luka Brgić	"Istria mia"	—				
4	Katja Budimčić Sabljar	"Leta su pasala"	—				
5	Dino Guščić	"Sad razumin"	—				
6	Melanija	"Guštan more"	—				
7	ženska klapa Hreljin	"Kokodak"	—				
8	Božidarka Matija Čerina & ž.v.s. Luštrin	"Bit ćeš se moje"	—				
9	Marinella	"Kažuni"	—				
10	Kožne jakne	"Kožna jaketa"	—				
11	Po' metra crijeva	"Metal je ča!"	—				
12	Lado Bartoniček	"Ja bin jopet bija njen"	—				
13	Alen Vitasović	"On ni doša"	—				
14	Daniel Moscarda	"Na škaline"	—				
15	Erik Balija	"Porat ud neba"	—				
16	Nevia Rigutto & Duško Jeličić	"Pod ruku me ćapaj"	1				
17	Voljen Grbac, Joso Butorac & klapa Tić	"Suza s Kvarnera"	2				
18	Tamara Brusić i ženska klapa Hreljin	"Ženske za feštu"	3				

=== Second night ===
The second show was held in Rijeka.

Second night: 20 June 2023
Draw	Artist	Song	Ballot vote ranking	Updated general ranking					
Draw	Artist	Song	Ballot vote ranking	Updated general ranking	1	Nevia Rigutto & Duško Jeličić	"Pod ruku me ćapaj"	—	2
2	Voljen Grbac, Joso Butorac & klapa Tić	"Suza s Kvarnera"	1	1					
3	Tamara Brusić i ženska klapa Hreljin	"Ženske za feštu"	2	3					
4	Božidarka Matija Čerina & ž.v.s. Luštrin	"Bit ćeš se moje"	3	—					
5	Melanija	"Guštan more"	—	—					
6	Eleonora Dobrović & Luka Brgić	"Istria mia"	—	—					
7	Kožne jakne	"Kožna jaketa"	—	—					
8	ženska klapa Hreljin	"Kokodak"	—	—					
9	Marinella	"Kažuni"	—	—					
10	Katja Budimčić Sabljar	"Leta su pasala"	—	—					
11	Lado Bartoniček	"Ja bin jopet bija njen"	—	—					
12	Po' metra crijeva	"Metal je ča!"	—	—					
13	Matej Plavček & Maja Miljavac	"Na vrh Učke"	—	—					
14	Daniel Moscarda	"Na škaline"	—	—					
15	Alen Vitasović	"On ni doša"	—	—					
16	Erik Balija	"Porat ud neba"	—	—					
17	Dino Guščić	"Sad razumin"	—	—					
18	ženska klapa Vejanke	"Zavavik tu"	—	—					

=== Third night ===
The third night was held in Barban.

Third night: 21 June 2023
Draw	Artist	Song	Ballot vote ranking	Updated general ranking					
Draw	Artist	Song	Ballot vote ranking	Updated general ranking	1	Voljen Grbac, Joso Butorac & klapa Tić	"Suza s Kvarnera"	—	2
2	Tamara Brusić i ženska klapa Hreljin	"Ženske za feštu"	1	1					
3	Božidarka Matija Čerina & ž.v.s. Luštrin	"Bit ćeš se moje"	—	—					
4	Melanija	"Guštan more"	—	—					
5	Eleonora Dobrović & Luka Brgić	"Istria mia"	3	—					
6	Kožne jakne	"Kožna jaketa"	—	—					
7	ženska klapa Hreljin	"Kokodak"	—	—					
8	Marinella	"Kažuni"	—	—					
9	Katja Budimčić Sabljar	"Leta su pasala"	—	—					
10	Lado Bartoniček	"Ja bin jopet bija njen"	—	—					
11	Po' metra crijeva	"Metal je ča!"	—	—					
12	Matej Plavček & Maja Miljavac	"Na vrh Učke"	—	—					
13	Daniel Moscarda	"Na škaline"	—	—					
14	Alen Vitasović	"On ni doša"	2	—					
15	Erik Balija	"Porat ud neba"	—	—					
16	Nevia Rigutto & Duško Jeličić	"Pod ruku me ćapaj"	—	3					
17	Dino Guščić	"Sad razumin"	—	—					
18	ženska klapa Vejanke	"Zavavik tu"	—	—					

=== Fourth night ===
The fourth night was held in Krk. It served as a main dress rehearsal prior to the final thus no voting occurred.

Fourth night: 23 June 2023
Draw	Artist	Song			
Draw	Artist	Song	1	Tamara Brusić i ženska klapa Hreljin	"Ženske za feštu"
2	Alen Vitasović	"On ni doša"			
3	Eleonora Dobrović & Luka Brgić	"Istria mia"			
4	Božidarka Matija Čerina & ž.v.s. Luštrin	"Bit ćeš se moje"			
5	Melanija	"Guštan more"			
6	Kožne jakne	"Kožna jaketa"			
7	ženska klapa Hreljin	"Kokodak"			
8	Marinella	"Kažuni"			
9	Katja Budimčić Sabljar	"Leta su pasala"			
10	Lado Bartoniček	"Ja bin jopet bija njen"			
11	Po' metra crijeva	"Metal je ča!"			
12	Matej Plavček & Maja Miljavac	"Na vrh Učke"			
13	Daniel Moscarda	"Na škaline"			
14	Erik Balija	"Porat ud neba"			
15	Nevia Rigutto & Duško Jeličić	"Pod ruku me ćapaj"			
16	Dino Guščić	"Sad razumin"			
17	Voljen Grbac, Joso Butorac & klapa Tić	"Suza s Kvarnera"			
18	ženska klapa Vejanke	"Zavavik tu"			

=== Fifth night ===
The fifth and final night was held in Krk.

Fifth night: 24 June 2023
Draw	Artist	Song	Ballot vote ranking	Final general ranking					
Draw	Artist	Song	Ballot vote ranking	Final general ranking	1	ženska klapa Vejanke	"Zavavik tu"	2	—
2	Matej Plavček & Maja Miljavac	"Na vrh Učke"	—	—					
3	Kožne jakne	"Kožna jaketa"	—	—					
4	Eleonora Dobrović & Luka Brgić	"Istria mia"	—	—					
5	Dino Guščić	"Sad razumin"	—	—					
6	Marinella	"Kažuni"	—	—					
7	Nevia Rigutto & Duško Jeličić	"Pod ruku me ćapaj"	—	3					
8	Lado Bartoniček	"Ja bin jopet bija njen"	—	—					
9	ženska klapa Hreljin	"Kokodak"	—	—					
10	Božidarka Matija Čerina & ž.v.s. Luštrin	"Bit ćeš se moje"	—	—					
11	Melanija	"Guštan more"	—	—					
12	Daniel Moscarda	"Na škaline"	—	—					
13	Po' metra crijeva	"Metal je ča!"	—	—					
14	Katja Budimčić Sabljar	"Leta su pasala"	—	—					
15	Erik Balija	"Porat ud neba"	—	—					
16	Tamara Brusić i ženska klapa Hreljin	"Ženske za feštu"	3	2					
17	Alen Vitasović	"On ni doša"	—	—					
18	Voljen Grbac, Joso Butorac & klapa Tić	"Suza s Kvarnera"	1	1					

== Special guests ==
The special guests of Melodije Istre i Kvarnera 2023 included:

- Singers / musicians: Gianluca Draguzet, Damir Kedžo, Vesna Nežić-Ružić, Sergio Pavat, Danijel Rubeša, Mauro Staraj, Nikolina Tomljanović

== Official album ==
Melodije Istre i Kvarnera 2023. is the official compilation album of the contest. It was released by Melody Records in CD format on 9 June 2023. The album features studio versions of all 18 entries.

The album debuted at number 33 on the Croatiand Albums Chart issued weekly by Top lista. It charted for a total of two weeks making it the festival's first compilation album to chart.

Weekly chart performance for Melodije Istre i Kvarnera 2023
Chart (2023)	Peak position
Croatian Domestic Albums (Top lista)	33
