= Marko Kutlić =

Croatian singer, songwriter, and author (b. 1995)

- Born: 18 May 1995 (age 31); Slavonski Brod, Croatia
- Genre: Pop
- Occupations: Singer; songwriter
- Instruments: Vocals; piano; guitar
- Years active: 2012–present
- Label: Hit Records

Marko Kutlić (born 18 May 1995) is a Croatian singer.

== Music career ==
=== 1995–2013: Early life ===
Marko Kutlić was born on 18 May 1995 in Slavonski Brod, Croatia. Kutlić moved with his family to Zagreb when he was 6 years old, where he started singing in church choirs. Later, he started uploading covers of popular song on his YouTube channel. His first recorded song was a cover of "Tears Don't Fall" by the British band Bullet for My Valentine. Kutlić recorded several more covers, of which the most popular was the rendition of Adele's "Someone like You".

=== 2014–2017: Pravila igre ===
In 2014 the band Pravila igre was formed with Kutlić as the lead vocalist. In early 2015 the band released its debut single "Nebo na mojoj strani" which later topped the HR Top 40 chart in Croatia. The band's debut album Nebo na mojoj strani was released on 22 March 2017 through Croatia Records. Shortly after the album's release, Kutlić left the bend due to disagreements with the other members.

=== 2018–present: Solo career ===
After parting ways with Pravila igre in 2017 Kutlić pursued a solo career. He released his first single as a lead artist "Srce se spasilo" in the second half of 2017. The song was written by Aleksandar Čubrilo, Marko Vojvodić and Igor Ivanović. On 22 November 2019 Kutlić released his debut studio album U kapi tvoje ljubavi. The album debuted and peaked at number 7 on the Croatian Albums Chart. On the 67th edition of the Zagreb Festival, Kutlić performed his song "Samo nek' ona sretna je", at the end of the competition he was announced as the winner. Later the song became his first solo number one single in Croatia.

== Personal life ==
Kutlić was in a relationship with Croatian singer Antonela Đinđić.

== Discography ==
=== Studio albums ===
Title	Details	Peak chart positions
Title	Details	CRO
U kapi tvoje ljubavi	Released: 16 November 2019; Label: Hit Records; Formats: CD, digital download	7

=== Singles ===
Title	Year	Peak chart positions	Album
Title	Year	CRO Airplay	Album
"Srce se spasilo"	2017	3	U kapi tvoje ljubavi
"Usne tvoje"	2018	12	U kapi tvoje ljubavi
"Sam protiv svih"	2018	8	U kapi tvoje ljubavi
"U kapi tvoje ljubavi"	2018	11	U kapi tvoje ljubavi
"U zagrljaju spašeni" (with Nela)	2019	2	U kapi tvoje ljubavi
"Samo ljubav"	2019	7	U kapi tvoje ljubavi
"Sreća"	2019	3	U kapi tvoje ljubavi
"Samo nek' ona sretna je"	2019	1	U kapi tvoje ljubavi
"Kreni"	2020	3	U kapi tvoje ljubavi
"Budi moja noć"	2021	2	Poleti ptico
"Zaplesala je s ljetom" (with Matija Cvek)	2021	2	Poleti ptico
"Uz nju"	2021	4	Poleti ptico
"Suviše sam njen"	2022	12	Poleti ptico
"Budiš me"	2022	5	Poleti ptico
"Poleti ptico"	2022	6	Poleti ptico
"Zar svejedno je"	2023	5	Poleti ptico
"Neotuđivo"	2026	4	Moram dalje
"Uzmi i drugi dio mene"	2026	1	Moram dalje
"Probudi me"	2026	2	Moram dalje
"Vratila se"	2026	11	Moram dalje
"—" denotes releases that did not chart or were not released in that territory.
