= Melodije Istre i Kvarnera 2024 =

Croatian song contest

Dates
- Heat 1: 31 May 2024
- Heat 2: 1 June 2024
- Heat 3: 2 June 2024
- Heat 4: 3 June 2024
- Heat 5: 4 June 2024
- Final: 6 June 2024

Host
- Venue: Bakar, Kastav, Punat, Svetvinčenat, Pazin and Rijeka
- Host broadcaster: HRT, HR Radio Pula, HR Radio Rijeka

Vote
- Voting system: Ballot vote, professional jury

The Melodije Istre i Kvarnera 2024 is the 54th edition of the annual Melodije Istre i Kvarnera, a song contest held annually in multiple towns in the Istria and Primorje-Gorski Kotar counties of Croatia. The Melodije Istre i Kvarnera 2024 marks the milestone 60th anniversary since its inaugural edition in 1964.

The 2024 edition of the contest is scheduled to take place from 1 June to 8 June 2024. The host cities and municipalities for this year's contest include Bakar, Kastav, Punat, Svetvinčenat, Pazin and Rijeka, where the final night will be held on 8 June 2024.

== Background ==
On 30 November 2023 the submission period where artists and composers were able to submit their entries to the organisers until 1 February 2024. To be accepted, songs must either have lyrics written in the Chakavian dialect or Croatian literary language, or in Italian dialectal or literary language, with thematic relevance to the festival's region. Alternatively, they must incorporate ethno elements from the Istrian-Kvarner region into the musical composition.

== Format ==
The Melodije Istre i Kvarnera 2024 contest will feature six host cities: Bakar, Kastav, Punat, Svetvinčenat, Pazin and Rijeka each hosting an evening of performances and voting. Votes will be collected independently in each city throughout the event. On the final night in Rijeka, the votes from all six evenings will be aggregated to determine the overall winner of the contest. Throughout the event, all songs will be performed on each evening, with the winner of the previous night having the honor of performing first on the subsequent day.

== Competing entries ==
On 14 March 2024 a list of all compiting entries and artists was published. Sixteen entries were selected, the participant include previous winners such as Duško Jeličić, Gina Picinić, Grupa 777, Joso Butorac, Karin Kuljanić and Nevia Rigutto. The competing entries were released on 15 May 2024. Elis Lovrić was supposed to participate with the entry "Dobrota", but on the day the songs were presented, a song titled "Moja mati" was listed as her entry instead.

Competing songs and artists, showing writers
Artist	Song	Songwriter(s)
Dino Guščić, Matej Plavček & Jure Kaurloto	"Tri mladića"	Robert Pilepić; Robert Grubišić
Duško Jeličić	"Vala moje mladosti"	Zlatan Marunić; Robert Grubišić
Eleonora Dobrović & Luka Brgić	"Srića"	Suzana Matušan Avgustini; Mario Marušić
Elis Lovrić	"Moja mati"	Elis Lovrić, Mate Balota
Erik Balija	"Litrat moga kraja"	Erik Balija; Ljubica Bestulić Stanković
Franko Krajcar	"Jušto tako"	Franko Krajcar
Gina Picinić	"Sansego moja mladosti"	Andrej Baša
Grupa 777	"Reci mi more"	Andrej Baša
Ibrica Jusić	"Ča san lin"	Duško Rapotec Ute; Vjeko Alilović
Joso Butorac & Klapa Tić	"Pisme puka moga"	Adela Dobrić Jelača; David Kabalin
Karin Kuljanić & Klapa Tić	"Srce na cesti"	Robert Grubišić; Mirjana Bobuš
Katja Budimčić Sabljar & Andrina Frleta	"Pelica od pine"	Robert Grubišić; Vjeko Alilović
Kožne jakne	"List z Nevijorka"	Teo Kažoki; Velimir Tuhtan
Lorenza Puhar	"Srićo moja lipa"	Goran Šarac; Robert Pilepić
Nevia Rigutto & Darko Jurković	"Noć"	Lara Pilepić; Ljubica Bestulić Stanković
Zemir Delić	"Kapot"	Zemir Delić

== Shows ==
=== First night ===
The first show was held at the Spomen Dom in Pazin.

First night: 31 May 2024
Draw	Artist	Song	Ballot vote ranking	Number of votes					
Draw	Artist	Song	Ballot vote ranking	Number of votes	1	Katja Budimčić Sabljar & Andrina Frleta	"Pelica od pine"	—	—
2	Elis Lovrić	"Moja mati"	—	—					
3	Nevia Rigutto & Darko Jurković	"Noć"	—	—					
4	Grupa 777	"Reci mi more"	—	—					
5	Joso Butorac & Klapa Tić	"Pisme puka moga"	—	—					
6	Dino Guščić, Matej Plavček & Jure Kaurloto	"Tri mladića"	1	203					
7	Duško Jeličić	"Vala moje mladosti"	—	—					
8	Kožne jakne	"List z Nevijorka"	—	—					
9	Ibrica Jusić	"Ča san lin"	—	—					
10	Karin Kuljanić & Klapa Tić	"Srce na cesti"	—	—					
11	Lorenza Puhar	"Srićo moja lipa"	3	100					
12	Franko Krajcar	"Jušto tako"	—	—					
13	Zemir Delić	"Kapot"	—	—					
14	Erik Balija	"Litrat moga kraja"	—	—					
15	Eleonora Dobrović & Luka Brgić	"Srića"	—	—					
16	Gina Picinić	"Sansego moja mladosti"	2	112					

=== Second night ===
The second show was held in Bakar at the Dom kulture "Matija Mažić".

Second night: 1 June 2024
Draw	Artist	Song	Ballot vote ranking	Number of votes	Updated general ranking	Updated total points							
Draw	Artist	Song	Ballot vote ranking	Number of votes	Updated general ranking	Updated total points	1	Lorenza Puhar	"Srićo moja lipa"	—	—	—	—
2	Eleonora Dobrović & Luka Brgić	"Srića"	—	—	—	—							
3	Ibrica Jusić	"Ča san lin"	—	—	—	—							
4	Franko Krajcar	"Jušto tako"	—	—	—	—							
5	Erik Balija	"Litrat moga kraja"	—	—	—	—							
6	Grupa 777	"Reci mi more"	—	—	—	—							
7	Elis Lovrić	"Moja mati"	—	—	—	—							
8	Dino Guščić, Matej Plavček & Jure Kaurloto	"Tri mladića"	2	103	1	40							
9	Katja Budimčić Sabljar & Andrina Frleta	"Pelica od pine"	1	115	3	32							
10	Duško Jeličić	"Vala moje mladosti"	—	—	—	—							
11	Karin Kuljanić & Klapa Tić	"Srce na cesti"	—	—	—	—							
12	Kožne jakne	"List z Nevijorka"	—	—	—	—							
13	Gina Picinić	"Sansego moja mladosti"	3	82	2	33							
14	Nevia Rigutto & Darko Jurković	"Noć"	—	—	—	—							
15	Joso Butorac & Klapa Tić	"Pisme puka moga"	—	—	—	—							
16	Zemir Delić	"Kapot"	—	—	—	—							
