= Croatia Records =

Croatian record label

- Type: Joint stock
- Industry: Music industry
- Founded: As Elektroton in 1938, nationalised in 1947 as Jugoton, renamed in 1991, registered at the Commercial Court on January 30, 1996
- Headquarters: Zagreb, Croatia
- Key people: Želimir Babogredac
- Products: Audio CD, DVD-Video, Audio Cassette, Gramophone record
- Parent: AUTOR d.o.o.
- Website: www.crorec.hr

Croatia Records is a record label in Croatia owned by AUTOR d.o.o., based in Zagreb.

== Summary ==
Croatia Records d.d. is a joint-stock company currently led by the chief executive officer Želimir Babogredac, a sound engineer. It releases mostly (but not exclusively) mainstream music, and has signed many prominent Croatian musicians of various music genres such as Dražen Zečić, Arsen Dedić, Mišo Kovač, Josipa Lisac, Majke, Teška Industrija, Thompson, Maksim Mrvica, Crvena jabuka, Jelena Rozga, Novi fosili, Opća opasnost, Rade Šerbedžija, Jacques Houdek, Parni valjak, Leteći odred, Mladen Grdović, Dino Dvornik, Dino Merlin, Hari Rončević, Radojka Šverko, Giuliano, Mate Bulić, Disciplin A Kitschme, Srebrna krila, Divlje jagode, Indexi, Sinan Alimanović, Lu Jakelić, Mia Dimšić, Mia Negovetić, Nina Donelli and others. Today, Croatia Records claims to have 70% share of the Croatian music market and has 30 record shops. Being a continuation of Jugoton, from which it inherited a comprehensive audio and video collection, Croatia Records is also active in re-releasing numerous digitally remastered former Yugoslav pop and rock titles. Following the global retro trend, the company decided to re-introduce gramophone records as well.

== History ==
The company that is today Croatia Records was founded in 1947 in Zagreb, the capital of the then-People's Republic of Croatia under the name Jugoton, a publicly owned company which was the largest record label and chain record store in the former SFR Yugoslavia. During several decades of its successful existence, Jugoton signed many eminent ex-Yugoslav artists such as: Indexi, Bijelo Dugme, Električni Orgazam, Haustor, Idoli and Leb i Sol, and also numerous important foreign stars for the domestic market including: Elvis Presley, The Beatles, Rolling Stones, Madonna, U2, David Bowie, Queen, Deep Purple, Pink Floyd, Iron Maiden, Kraftwerk, Depeche Mode etc. The company also owned a chain of record shops across Yugoslavia. Many Yugoslav entries in the Eurovision Song Contest were signed with Jugoton including the 1989 winners Riva.

=== Croatian independence ===
After the transition from socialist state to parliamentary democracy in 1989, the question of Croatia's self-determination from Yugoslavia was raised. In 1991, shortly before the declaration of Croatian independence and the breakup of Yugoslavia, the company's name Jugoton, a portmanteau word of Jugoslavija (Yugoslavia) and tone, was changed to Croatia Records. The company was inherited by the now-independent Republic of Croatia and since the previous economic system was abandoned, it was privatized. Since the year of 2000, Croatia Records has been managed by professionals from the music industry who joined a partnership company called AUTOR d.o.o. In 2001, the musician Miroslav Škoro became the leader of Croatia Records, until his resignation in 2006.

== Controversy ==
Croatia Records has been the object of a controversy raised by singer Branimir Štulić over royalty rights. Štulić claims royalties of songs by former rock band Azra, whose lead singer and songwriter he was in the 1980s, and which was then managed by Croatia Record's predecessor Jugoton. Štulić has named a sum of 12 million Euros he believes the company owes him but has not opted to take legal action to claim it. Želimir Babogredac replied that Croatia Records has all the legal rights to release titles by Štulić and Azra, as the company is a direct successor of Jugoton, whom these artists were signed for. He also said that the sum Štulić claims is exaggerated. However, he added that Croatia Records is proud to have the highly acclaimed Štulić in the list of its artists and that he may receive a payment from the sale of audio CDs only if he joins the Croatian Composers' Society (ZAMP).

== Acknowledgements ==
- Charter of the Republic of Croatia (2023), conferred by Zoran Milanović

== See also ==
- Suzy Records
- Menart Records
- Music of Croatia
- Croatian popular music
- List of record labels
