= The Barry Sisters =

American jazz duo

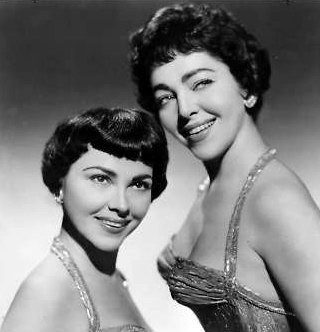
Claire (left) and Merna Barry

Minnie Bagelman (April 6, 1923 – October 31, 1976) and Clara Bagelman (October 17, 1920 – November 22, 2014), best known under the stage names Merna and Claire Barry, were popular American Yiddish and jazz entertainers from the 1940s to the early 1970s.

== Early years ==
Minnie and Clara were born in the Bronx, New York, to Ashkenazi Jewish parents, Herman and Ester, from the Russian and Austro-Hungarian Empires, respectively. Herman Bagelman was born in present-day Berdychiv, Ukraine. Minnie and Clara also had two younger sisters, Celia and Julia. When Minnie and Clara decided to entertain by singing in Yiddish, as The Bagelman Sisters, their father told them they would need to do it in the manner of the Old World and not with American accents.

The young girls got their first break as singers on WLTH Radio's Uncle Norman show for children and were still then known as The Bagelman Sisters. They cut their first recordings with Victor Records in the late 1930s, and made a name for themselves as Yiddish jazz singers. When the Andrews Sisters' version of the Yiddish song, "Bei Mir Bistu Shein" (as "Bei Mir Bist Du Schön"), became a hit, musician and composer Sam Medoff, known professionally as Dick Manning, started his Yiddish Melodies in Swing radio program on New York's WHN. Before joining the radio show, the sisters made a change of their stage surname, from Bagelman to Barry.

From 1937 until the mid-1950s they performed on the program, where they would sing jazz recordings in Yiddish. Their recordings included popular tunes, such as "Raindrops Keep Fallin' on My Head", translated into Yiddish ("Trop'ns Fin Regen Oif Mein Kop"). They also performed in New York's Catskills resort hotels. They eventually toured with Mickey Katz. During the height of their popularity, they made appearances on the Ed Sullivan Show, The Jack Paar Program and The Tonight Show starring Johnny Carson. They were one of the few American acts to tour the Soviet Union in 1959. Israel and Zionism were common themes in their music, and the sisters entertained Israeli troops during the Yom Kippur War. The Barry Sisters "didn't look like the typical Yiddish theater stars or singers of that era", it was observed. "They looked glamorous. And they spared no expense for their orchestrations—they always had the best orchestrations possible."

The sisters' 11th and final album, Our Way, was issued in 1973.

== Personal lives ==
Merna Barry, later Mrs. Emanuel Pine, was born on April 6, 1923, and died on October 31, 1976, aged 53 (not 51 as was misreported) from a brain tumor following a lengthy hospitalization in Manhattan's Flower and Fifth Avenue Hospital.

Claire Barry (later Mrs. Easton) was born on October 17, 1920, and died on November 22, 2014, aged 94, in Aventura, Florida, having survived her younger sister by 41 years. She was survived by a daughter, Joy Pargman. Claire Barry Easton was featured in the 2002 NPR radio show, The Yiddish Radio Project.

== Discography ==
- The Barry Sisters (10", Album); 1951 Banner Records LP 058
- The Barry Sisters; Banner Records BAS-1009 (compilation of recordings originally released as 78 rpm records)
- The Barry Sisters Sing…; 1957 Cadence CLP-4001 (w/Abe Ellstein)
- At Home with the Barry Sisters; 1959 Roulette SR-25060 (w/Abe Ellstein)
- Side by Side; 1961 Roulette SR-25136 (w/Joe Reisman)
- We Belong Together; 1961 Roulette SR-25156;(w/Jerry Fielding)
- Shalom; 1961 Roulette SR-25157 (w/Joe Reisman)
- The Barry Sisters in Israel (live); 1963 Roulette SR-25198
- The World of the Barry Sisters: Memorable Jewish Melodies; Roulette SR-25258
- The Barry Sisters Sing Fiddler On The Roof; 1964 ABC-Paramount ABCS-516
- Something Spanish; ABC-Paramount ABCS-578 (arranged and conducted by Chico O'Farrill)
- A Time To Remember; 1966 ABC-Paramount ABCS-597
- The Best Of The Barry Sisters; 1966 Roulette RR-30748;
- Jewish Favourites; 1969 Saga Eros;
- Our Way (Tahka-Tahka); 1973 Roulette/Mainstream/Red Lion MRL-393; 1973 (w/Jim Tyler, Jerry Graff)
- Moishe Oysher With The Barry Sisters - A Gala Concert With Moishe Oysher And The Barry Sisters. Volume 2 (2xLP, Album); 1973 The Greater Recording Co., Inc. GRC-296;
