= Ivica Šerfezi =

Croatian pop singer

Ivan "Ivica" Šerfezi
- Born: Ivan Šerfezi; 1 December 1935; Zagreb, Kingdom of Yugoslavia
- Died: 29 May 2004 (aged 68); Zagreb, Croatia
- Other name: Ivica
- Occupation: Singer
- Years active: 1950's–2004

Ivan "Ivica" Šerfezi (1 December 1935 – 29 May 2004) was a Croatian pop singer hailing from Zagreb.

Ivan "Ivica" Šerfezi started singing in dance halls, and his first real success was a duet with Domenico Modugno at the Maksimir Stadium, Zagreb (Modugno had a worldwide hit song, "Volare"). In the 1960s and the 1970s Šerfezi made many tours throughout Yugoslavia, East Germany, as well as the Soviet Union, and his concerts filled up 150 venues.

His songs were often influenced by Mexican and Greek folk music. The primary composers of his songs were Ivica Krajač and Nikica Kalogjera. Some of his hit songs included "Suze liju plave oči" (Croatian version of the Willie Nelson classic, "Blue Eyes Crying in the Rain"), "Ruže su crvene" (Croatian version of the Bobby Vinton classic, "Roses are Red"), "Ksimeroni", "Elada", etc.

His career lasted for 46 years and he had 15 gold records. He also sang many duets with the very popular female Macedonian singer, Ljupka Dimitrovska.

Šerfezi was nicknamed Šerfa, and called "the golden boy of home show business". He was an avid tennis and golf player, and in later years also a politician. In 2001, as a longtime supporter of the Croatian Peasant Party, he ran as that party's candidate on the elections for Zagreb City Assembly, but his list failed to enter the Assembly.

Šerfezi died in May 2004, just months after he had been diagnosed with stomach cancer.

== Lyrics ==
from the song Ruže su crvene:
Ruže su crvene tajne su skrivene slatka je muzika ali nije kao ti	Roses are red secrets are hidden the music is sweet but not like you
