= Ljupka Dimitrovska =

Croatian singer (1946–2016)

Ljupka Dimitrovska Љупка Димитровска
- Born: Ljupka Dimitrovska; 25 July 1946; Skopje, PR Macedonia, FPR Yugoslavia
- Died: 3 October 2016 (aged 70) Zagreb, Croatia
- Genre: Pop
- Occupation: Singer
- Instrument: Vocals
- Years active: 1968–1994
- Label: Jugoton

Ljupka Dimitrovska (Macedonian: Љупка Димитровска; 25 July 1946 – 3 October 2016) was a Macedonian-born Croatian singer. Internationally, she was best known for "Adio," written by Nikica Kalogjera and Ivica Krajač, which won the first prize at the 1970 Athens pop song festival. She died in Zagreb, aged 70.

== Career ==
Dimitrovska's version of "Adio" was released in Greece on the Music Box label.

== Works ==
=== Singles ===
- 1968 - Dvajca mladići za edna devojka
- 1969 - Čibu čiba
- 1970 - Adio
- 1970 - En ten tini
- 1970 - A šta da se radi
- 1970 - Čiki-čiki-či
- 1971 - Obećanje
- 1971 - Edna moma čeka
- 1973 - Ne igraj se sa mnom
- 1975 - Ljutiće se moja majka
- 1976 - Ćao
- 1976 - Ja ga hoću, a on mene neće
- 1977 - Eto tako nije lako
- 1977 - Ostaje nam muzika
- 1978 - Ljubav je nešto više
- 1978 - Tvoja barka mala
- 1978 - Hej momče
- 1979 - Igramo se, igramo
- 1980 - Majka Maru
- 1980 - Gitara, gitara
- 1981 - Maestral
- 1982 - Biće bolje
- 1983 - Ne vjeruj mi ništa
- 1983 - Robot
- 1984 - Kad čujem harmoniku
- 1986 - Ne pitaj me šta mi je
- 1987 - Bilo gdje
- 1988 - Slika s mature
- 1988 - Šanana
- 1988 - Vječna tajna
- 1990 - Makfest - Zvona zvonat
- 1994 - Lipa Dalmacija

=== Longplay ===
- 1975 - Ljupka
- 1979 - Igramo se
- 1980 - U dvoje je ljepše (with Ivica Šerfezi)
- 1982 - Nasmiješi se
- 1985 - Nisam se kajala
- 1988 - Slika s mature
- 1990 - Zvona zvone
- 1993 - Moji najveći hitovi
- 1999 - U dvoje je ljepše (withIvica Šerfezi)
