= Sofia Ameli Gojić =

Croatian mezzo-soprano (born 1968)

- Born: 5 February 1968 (age 58); Sisak, Socialist Republic of Croatia, Yugoslavia
- Education: Academy of Music, University of Zagreb; University of Music and Performing Arts Vienna
- Occupations: Opera singer; vocal coach
- Years active: 1990–present
- Spouse: Dušan Gojić
- Awards: Gold Medal of Mare Nostrum Croaticum for life achievements

Sofia Ameli Gojić (born 5 February 1968) is a Croatian mezzo-soprano. She is principal opera singer and vocal coach at Croatian National Theatre in Zagreb.

== Early life and education ==
Sofia Ameli Gojić was born in Sisak, Croatia, where she started her education in music and performing arts. When she was thirteen years old, Croatian composer V. Rakijas, inspired by her singing, composed a song for her, which she premiered and recorded for Croatian radio and television.

She studied opera singing at the Academy of Music, University of Zagreb, in the class of Prof. Nada Puttar-Gold. and completed a degree in singing. She continued her postgraduate studies at the University of Music and Performing Arts Vienna, in the class of Prof. Leopold Spitzer. She also worked with distinguished pedagogue Stojan Stojanov Gancev.

== Career ==
After finishing her studies, she was engaged as a soloist opera singer at the Opera of the Croatian National Theatre in Zagreb. At the same time, she performed as a guest singer in other opera houses and concert halls in Croatia, as well as in Austria, Bosnia and Herzegovina, Germany, Hungary, Italy, Macedonia, Montenegro, Serbia and Slovenia. She started her career as a soprano and in the first twelve years she sang a large number of title and leading roles such as Rosina, Mimì, Musetta, Violetta Valery, Hanna Glawary, Marzenka, Abigaille, Suor Angelica, Santuzza and others. In 2002, after performing the role of Santuzza, she received offers to sing mezzo-soprano roles. From 2002 she has sung a large number of mezzo-soprano and alto roles, among which are the roles of Amneris, Azucena, Carmen, Eboli, Fenena, Ulrica, Princess Clarice and Zia Principessa. She has performed leading roles in contemporary operas, such as Greta (The Metamorphosis), Marianne (Stories from the Vienna Forest), Girl (Talk to me about Augusta) and Mrs. Steel (Penguins).

She recorded various pieces of contemporary music and different projects for Croatian Radio and Television, RTV Macedonia, RTV Montenegro, Radio Television of Serbia and Swiss Television. Her artistic activities include concerts with Zagreb Philharmonic Orchestra, Croatian Radio and Television Symphony Orchestra, Croatian Chamber Orchestra, Orchestra of the Ljubljana Opera, Cantus Ensemble, String Orchestra Dusan Skovran, Montenegrin Symphony Orchestra etc. She has participated in Opera Festivals and Festivals of Contemporary music: Music Biennale Zagreb, Gostic Days, Days of Croatian Music, Grosseto Festival, May Opera Evenings in Skopje, Kampnagel in Hamburg, International Miskolc Opera Festival and others

In the year 2005 she was awarded for life achievements with the Gold Medal of „Mare Nostrum Croaticum“ as the youngest opera singer who won this award ever. In the 2018/19 season as a vocal coach, she prepared the artists of the Ballet of the Croatian National Theatre for singing in the ballet production Apoksiomen. In the seasons of 2020/21 and 2021/22 she will sing the roles of Azucena, Carmen and Ulrica.

== Roles ==
Roles	Opera, Operetta, Contemporary Opera	Productions
Barbarina	Le Nozze di Figaro	1991
Musetta	La Boheme	1992, 1992
Rosina	Il Barbiere di Siviglia	1993, 1999
Jela	The Return	1993
Violetta Valéry	La Traviata	1994, 1995
Marēnka	The Bartered Bride	1994
Hanna Glawary	The Merry Widow	1994
Greta	Metamorphosis	1995
Mimì	La Bohème	1995
Marussa	Nozze Istriane	1995
Jelena	Nikola Šubić Zrinjski	1995
Marianne	Tales from the Vienna Forest	1997
Girl	Tell mi about Augusta	1999
Abigaille	Nabucco	2001, 2002
Suor Angelica	Suor Angelica	2001
Santuzza	Cavalleria Rusticana	2002
Suzuki	Madama Butterfly	2003, 2019
Princess Eboli	Don Carlo	2004
Fenena	Nabucco	2002, 2003, 2004, 2011
Ulrica	In Ballo in Maschera	2007, 2009
Mrs.Steel	Penguins	2007
Zia Principessa	Suor Angelica	2008
Maddalena	Rigoletto	2009
Doma	Ero the Joker	2011, 2017
Carmen	Carmen	2005, 2008, 2011
Amneris	Aida	2013, 2014
Jele	Equinox	2015
Princess Clarice	Love for three Oranges	2017
Vornic's Wife	Adel and Mara	2017
Mary	The Flying Dutchman	2018
Azucena	Il Trovatore	2005, 2005, 2019

== Personal life ==
Sofia Ameli Gojić lives with her husband, Croatian actor Dušan Gojić and their daughter in Zagreb, Croatia
