= Lu Jakelić =

Croatian singer and songwriter

- Born: Lucija Jakelić; September 6, 1993 (age 33); Đurđevac, Croatia
- Genres: Pop-rock, alternative pop
- Occupations: Singer, songwriter
- Instruments: Vocals, multiple instruments
- Years active: 2016–present
- Label: Croatia Records

Lucija "Lu" Jakelić (born 1993) is a Croatian singer and songwriter. Jakelić's debut album Sve o čemu sam šutjela (Everything I was silent about) (2019) reached number one on the Croatian Top of the Shops chart. Her first album spent 34 consecutive weeks on Croatian Best Selling Albums list. Jakelić's sophomore album Šesto Čulo (Sixth Sense) was published on November 25, 2022, and in the first week it also reached number one.

== Early life ==
According to an interview with Telegram on 21 December 2018, Jakelić knew she would become a musician at some point since she comes from a musical family. When she was eight years old, she started to play the piano.

She obtained a master's degree in Commmunicology at the University of Zagreb.

Mostly by hearing, she learned to play piano and the guitar. As said in many interviews, she was influenced by various music such as Fleetwood Mac, Joni Mitchell, Amy Winehouse, John Mayer, Alanis Morissette, Foo Fighters, grunge, alt-pop and rock musicians.

Lu spent her childhood and high school years in a small city before she moved to Zagreb to pursue college.

== Career ==
In late 2017, Jakelić appeared in Hrvatska radiotelevizija's television series A strana (A-side). Jakelić's debut album Sve o čemu sam šutjela (Everything I Kept Quiet About) was released on 11 November 2019 through Croatia Records. Sve o čemu sam šutjela peaked at number one on the Croatian Albums Chart.

In December 2019, Jakelić was announced as the green-room host of the third season of The Voice Hrvatska.

== Artistry ==
=== Influences ===
Jakelić cites Gibonni as her biggest musical influence.

=== Musical style and songwriting ===
Jakelić uses her life experiences as an inspiration in her work.

== Discography ==
=== Studio albums ===
Title	Details	Peak chart positions
Title	Details	CRO
Sve o čemu sam šutjela	Released: 11 November 2019; Formats: Digital download, CD; Label: Croatia Records	1

=== Singles ===
Title	Year	Peak chart positions	Album
Title	Year	CRO	Album
"Vodiš me"	2018	—	Sve o čemu sam šutjela
"Domine"	2019	21	Sve o čemu sam šutjela
"Možda"	2019	—	Sve o čemu sam šutjela
"Sve o čemu sam šutjela"	2019	34	Sve o čemu sam šutjela
"Jesmo li sami?"	2020	19	Sve o čemu sam šutjela
"Božić si ti" (with Josip Palameta)	2020	20	Non-album single
"—" denotes releases that did not chart or were not released in that territory.
