= Karin Kuljanić =

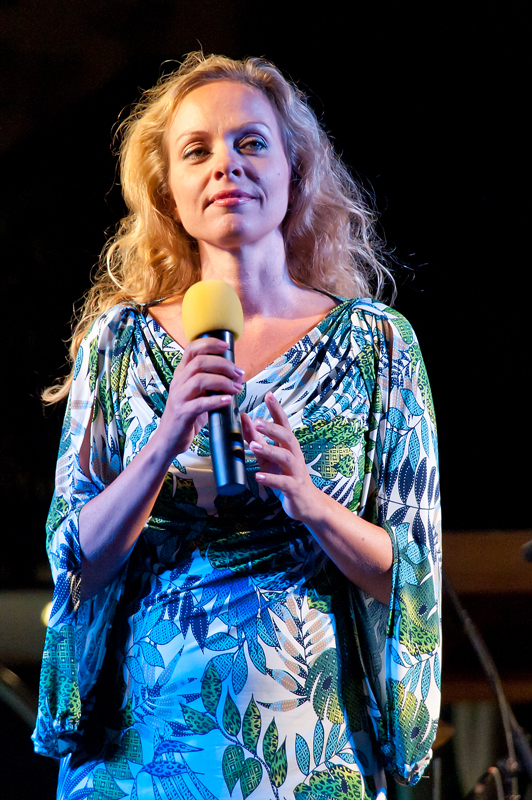
- Kuljanić in 2013

Background information
- Born: 1971 (age 54–55); Zagreb, SR Croatia, SFR Yugoslavia (now Croatia)
- Genres: Pop
- Occupations: Singer; psychologist
- Instrument: Vocals
- Years active: 1994–present

Karin Kuljanić (born 1971) is a Croatian singer and psychologist. She won the Public's Choice Award in the Melodije Istre i Kvarnera (MIK) five times.

== Early life ==
Karin Kuljanić was born in Zagreb in 1971. Her father is academician Elso Kuljanić, and her mother is Margherita Kuljanić. The family originates from the island of Cres. Her father originates from the village of Stivan, and her mother is from Belej.

== Musical career ==
Kuljanić performed for the first time at MIK in 1994 with the song "Zami me sobun sakamo", finishing in third place. She would win this song contest for the first time in 1999, and also had the same result in 2002, 2004, and 2005. She held her solo concert in 2009 in Kastav in the hall of the Fenice Theater. This marked 15 years of her career. That year she also released a studio album, entitled "Štorija od života". Kuljanić entered the MIK in 2022, winning the contest for the fifth time with the song "Fala ti na jubavi". At the 2024 edition of the contest she participated with the song "Srce na cesti".

== Other work ==
Kuljanić is a psychologist by profession, and after college she obtained a master's degree in clinical psychology in Zagreb and completed psychotherapy schools and works as a psychologist at KBC Rijeka at the Clinic for Gynecology and Obstetrics. She is currently the secretary of the Quality of Life Group of the European Society for Research and Treatment of Cancer (EORTC) in Brussels.

She is the current president of the Red Cross in Primorje-Gorski Kotar County.

== Discography ==
- Štorija od života (2009)
