= Van Bod =

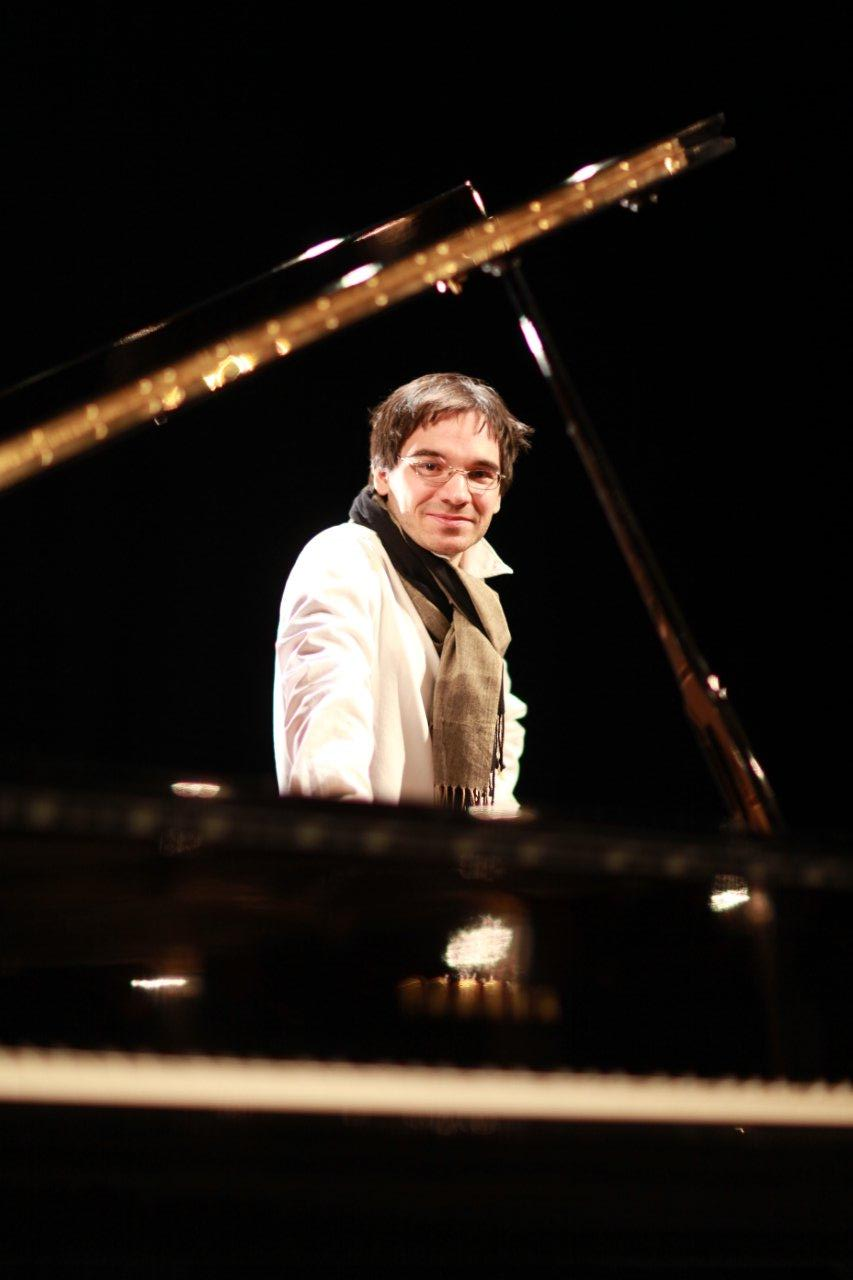
- Van Bod at HNK Osijek

Background information
- Also known as: Vladimir Bodegrajac
- Born: 22 March 1978 (age 48); Zagreb, Yugoslavia (present-day Zagreb, Republic of Croatia)
- Genres: Pop, Musical, Film score
- Occupations: Composer, Pianist, Pop singer
- Website: Official website

Vladimir Bodegrajac (born 22 March 1978 in Zagreb), known as Van Bod, is a Croatian composer, pianist and pop singer.

== Life and career ==
After finishing at the Vatroslav Lisinski Music School in Zagreb, he studied piano under Prof. Marina Ambokadze and musicology under Prof Larisa Loginova at the Ino Mirkovich Academy, under the license of the Moscow State Conservatory „P. I. Tchaikovsky“, where he received his master's degree in piano, mentor Prof. Marina Ambokadze.

He finished postgraduate studies of composition at „Komitas“ State Conservatory, Yerevan, Armenia, mentor Prof Armen Smbatyan. He worked as assistant of Prof Armen Smbatyan, rector of the Armenian Conservatory, at the composition department and as assistant of Prof Marina Ambokadze in the piano department of the Ino Mirkovic Academy. In 2005 he moved to Amsterdam, Netherlands, where he worked as a composer, singer and pianist for NTW Productions. Since 2006, he has worked at the UMJETNIČKA ŠKOLA FRANJE LUČIĆA in Velika Gorica, Croatia. He is also composing and performing his own songs and compositions.

== Achievements ==
- Composer of "Call Of Heart" for UNICEF children orchestra, Yerevan, Armenia, 2014
- Composer of UNESCO Children's Foundation "Sea Of Love" anthem, Paris, 1998
- Winner of Emerging composer prize on „Waging Peace Through Singing“ contest, Oregon, USA, 2002
- Performance at “Dora” (Eurovision Song Contest 2004, Croatia) with his own song "Don't cry"
- Works on orchestrations with Stepan Shakaryan - the direct successor and student of Aram Khachaturian
- Private concerts, TV appearances and radio broadcasts performing his own compositions, compositions of classical and modern composers, performing with chamber and symphony orchestras

== Discography ==
1. We (2011)
2. Destiny (2011) - arranged album in digital distribution
