= Alen Vitasović =

Croatian pop singer and songwriter (born 1968)

- Born: 5 July 1968 (age 58); Pula, SFR Yugoslavia (now Croatia)
- Occupation: Singer
- Years active: 1990s–present
- Awards: Order of Danica Hrvatska

Alen Vitasović (born 5 July 1968) is a Croatian pop singer and songwriter. Born in Pula, many of his songs are about his native Istria and mostly written in Chakavian dialect.

Vitasović began his music career early, learning how to play the harmonica at the age of five, and by twelve he was singing in bands, mainly in the tourist regions around Istria. After finishing music school in Pula, where he learned to play the piano and saxophone, he continued to play in bands across Croatia and Slovenia, until he was discovered while working at Radio HR Pula in the early 1990s. In 1993, Vitasović released his first single and continued to tour all over Croatia, making a name for himself.

Vitasović continued with his success, winning numerous festivals and awards throughout Croatia. In 1995, he was nominated for five Porin music awards, and was also the winner of the festivals in Split, Zadar, Pula, Vodice, and Korčula. In 1997, he was awarded the Order of Danica Hrvatska "Marko Marulić" (Red Danice hrvatske s likom Marka Marulića) by the President of Croatia for his contribution to Croatian music and culture.

Vitasović has collaborated with various music acts, including Crvena jabuka, Hari Rončević, Lisa Hunt, and Marko Perković.

On 27 March 2023, it was announced that Vitasović would participate at Melodije Istre i Kvarnera 2023 with the song "On ni doša". The song was released on 16 June 2023, with its subsequent music video being released, a few days later, on 21 June 2023.

== Discography ==
=== Albums ===
- 1994 – Gušti su gušti
- 1995 – Svi festivali
- 1997 – Come va?
- 2000 – Ja ne gren
- 2003 – Grih
- 2003 – Tone i pretelji

=== Singles ===
| Title | Year | Peak chart positions | Album |
| Title | Year | CRO | Album |
|---|---|---|---|
| "Da se ne zatare" | 2020 | — | Non-album singles |
| "Oštarije su mi zaprli" | 2020 | 22 | Non-album singles |
| "Dopri oči" (with Marco Grabber, Ivan Arnold & Livio Morosin) | 2023 | — (Note: "Dopri oči" did not enter the HR Top 40, but peaked at number 69 on the regional HR Top 100 (Istra i Primorje) chart.) | Non-album singles |
| "Tone livi" (with Marco Grabber & Ivan Arnold) | 2023 | — (Note: "Tone livi" did not enter the HR Top 40, but peaked at number 45 on the regional HR Top 100 (Istra i Primorje) chart.) | Non-album singles |
| "On ni doša" | 2023 | — (Note: "On ni doša" did not enter the HR Top 40, but peaked at number 73 on the regional HR Top 100 (Istra i Primorje) chart.) | Non-album singles |
"—" denotes releases that did not chart or were not released in that territory.
