= Mladen Grdović =

Croatian pop singer (born 1958)

- Born: Mladen Grdović; 28 July 1958 (age 68); Zadar, PR Croatia, FPR Yugoslavia
- Origin: Zadar, Croatia
- Genres: Pop; world music
- Occupations: Musician; author
- Instruments: Vocals; guitar
- Years active: 1990–present
- Labels: Jugoton; Croatia Records; Campus

Mladen Grdović (born 28 July 1958) is a Croatian pop singer of Albanian origin.

== Biography ==
Grdović was born in the city of Zadar to Veronika and Bepo. He was a fan of Adriano Celentano and Gianni Morandi, who inspired him to become a musician. At the age of six, his father gifted him a guitar, and next year enrolled him in a music school. At 16 he recorded his first song.

Grdović married Brankica in 1996. but the turbulent relationship was ended in 2020 after she filed for divorce. Grdović openly admitted to cheating with every girlfriend he had. He has a daughter Sara with Emina Šimurina. Due to his problems with alcohol and driving under the influence, Grdović was involved in multiple car crashes with his supercars and his driver's license was suspended on several occasions. He made a humorous song about it called “Crveni Ferarri” (meaning Red Ferarri). These habits forced him to go to rehabilitation.

He is currently living in Zadar. His favorite football club is Hajduk Split.

== Discography ==
Grdović collaborated with Marina Tomašević in her 1992 album Šarmer i skitnica and 1994 album Nedjelja popodne, and with other singers such as Bepo Matešić. Together with his solo performances, he has sold over 2.5 million copies.

Standalone albums:

- 1990 - Songs From Zadar
- 1990 - Doviđenja
- 1991 - Hrvatska Lađa
- 1993 - Nedostaješ Mi Ti
- 1994 - Tu Je Moj Dom
- 1995 - Za Zaljubljene
- 1995 - Italia Mix
- 1996 - Nije U Šoldima Sve
- 1996 - Ako Odeš Ti
- 1998 - Zlatni Hitovi
- 1999 - Vitar Nek Puše
- 2000 - Kada Se Ljubav U Vino Pretvori
- 2002 - I Za Dušu I Za Tilo
- 2003 - Evo Mene Moji Ljudi
- 2006 - E, Da Mi Je Vratit Vrime
- 2008 - Da Te Nima
- 2009 - Dobro Jutro Ti, More
- 2010 - Najljepše Ljubavne Pjesme
- 2012 - Za tebe živim ja
- 2014 - Samo more to zna
- 2016 - Nek' Se Čuje Pisma S Jadrana
- 2024 - Za Šaku Ljubavi
