= Radojka Šverko =

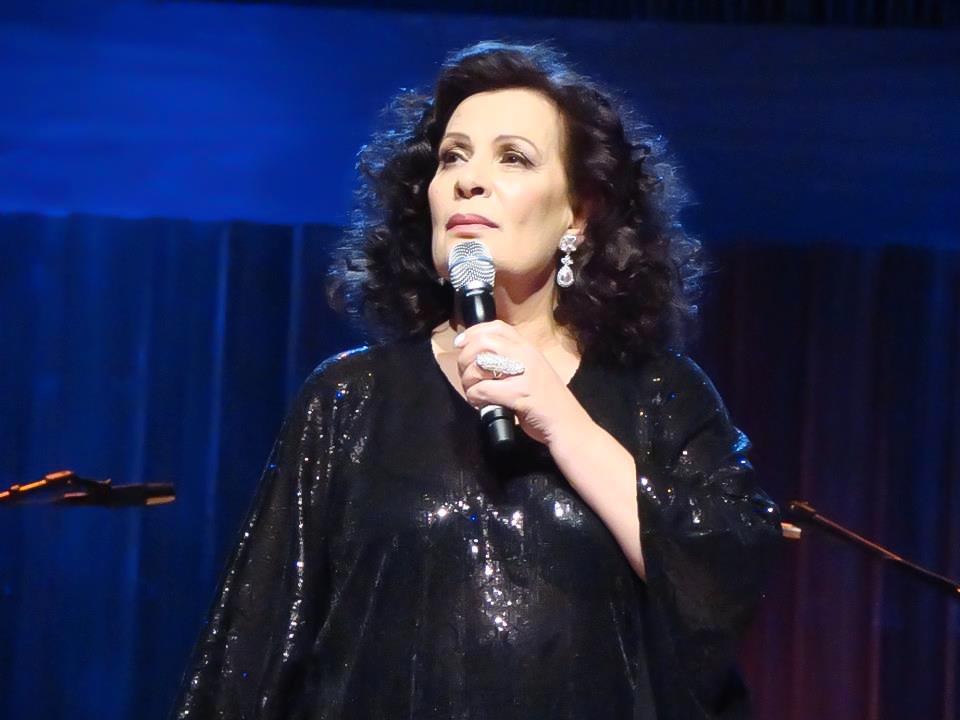

Background information
- Born: 9 April 1948 (age 77); Pazin, PR Croatia, FPR Yugoslavia
- Genres: pop rock; pop; jazz; church music
- Occupations: musician; singer-songwriter
- Years active: 1967–present

Radojka Šverko (born 9 April 1948) is a Croatian female singer-songwriter and an alto range artist.

Šverko was the recipient of many music festival awards, including winning the MIK (melodies of Istria and Kvarner) singing festival, which celebrates the tradition of the region. More recently she performed at the Split Festival (2005) for her song Licem u lice (lit. "Face to Face"). She has released numerous albums, singles and EPs for leading Croatian and Yugoslav record labels. She is an actress as well, who appeared in several films.

In February 2015 she sang at the inauguration of Croatian president Kolinda Grabar-Kitarović.
