= Croatian hip-hop =

Music genre or scene

Croatian hip hop
- Stylistic origins: Hip hop, urban, dance-pop, comedy hip hop, trap, alternative rock, drill, folk-pop
- Cultural origins: Mid to late-1990s, Croatia
- Typical instruments: Turntable, synthesizer, rapping, drum machine, sampler, guitar
- Derivative forms: West Coast hip hop, East Coast hip hop

Other topics
- Drum and bass, dubstep

Croatian hip hop is a genre of music, and a culture that covers a variety of styles of hip hop music made in Croatia. Croatian hip hop was originally influenced by the American hip hop scene and introduced to Croatia in the mid-1990s. Croatian hip hop, particularly that originating from Rijeka and Zagreb in the 1990s, was mainly concentrated on social issues due to the corruptive system of government at the time. In the 2000s, Croatian hip hop started becoming more mainstream and it spread to Split developing its own hip hop style.

== Origins ==
During the 1980s in Croatia and Yugoslavia, there was a mainstream surge of rock music called new wave which mostly suppressed other types of music from the mainstream. Electro-pop bands like Denis & Denis and funk musicians such as Dino Dvornik were unique at the time. It was Dino Dvornik that in 1989 launched his first album and started a revolution of electronic music in Yugoslavia.

In the middle of the 1980s in Rijeka emerged the first Croatian rapper MC Buffalo who released the first and only hip hop album in Yugoslavia. During that time in Zagreb Slavin Balen formed a radio show that played hip hop music called Rap Attack.

== Development of the style in the 1990s ==
In 1992 Ugly Leaders released the first Croatian hip hop album: Channel Is Deep & Beech. They were censored from most radio stations due to they hard and vulgar lyrics. The same year MC Buffalo & Maderfa'N'kerz released their debut album Made in Rijeka, including a track titled Moja Domovnica, a parody of Moja domovina that was banned in Croatia.

Zagreb-based radio station Radio 101 launched a show called Blackout Project in 1993, which popularized hip-hop. alongside Rap Attack.

In 1997, the Croatian rap group from Zagreb called Tram 11 launched its single "Croatian giants" (Hrvatski Velikani) which was the first rap song to hit #1 on Croatian music top-lists. In the late 1990s rappers emerged such as Stoka, General Woo, Target, The Beat Fleet band, DJ Knockout Renman, Drill Skillz etc. The Split-based band The Beet Fleet released their first album "Ping-Pong" in 1997, which was unofficially the first complete hip-hop/rap album in Croatia.

Croatian hip hop thematised social problems caused by the economic downturn and perceived government corruption. The 1990s saw a high point in the popularity of Croatian hip-hop, but it was less pronounced than that of new wave in the previous decade.

== Modern-day Croatian hip hop ==
By the end of the 1990s, the electronic/dance music in Croatia suffered its demise and the Croatian popular music started dominating the music scene. In the early 2000s, Bosniak rapper Edo Maajka launched his first album and became an instant hit in Croatia. It was then when rap music started becoming more mainstream. In 2004, rap artist Shorty released his album 1,68 and his hit single "Come to Vinkovci" dominated the Croatian music charts. The Beat Fleet also managed to enter the mainstream. Their innovative experimental rapping style mixed with Dalmatian mentality became a household name not only in Croatia but also in Serbia and Bosnia and Herzegovina.

In 2011, another Split-based hip hop band called "Dječaci" released their second album called "The truth" which made them one of the most popular bands in Croatia. They also gained popularity in the neighbouring countries.

In the mid-2010's appears wave of trap music, especially led by groups High5 and KUKU$, who them many often cite as pioneers of the genre itself in Croatia. The most notable artists in that era of 2010s and 2020s are: Vojko V, BUNTAI, Grše, 30zona, Dino Blunt, z++, Krankšvester, TTM, Bore Balboa, Podočnjaci and Baks, as well as members of the KUKU$ itself with their solo careers: Hiljson Mandela and Goca R.I.P.
