= Music of Croatia =

The music of Croatia, like the divisions of the country itself, has two major influences: Central European, present in central and northern parts of the country including Slavonia, and Mediterranean, present in coastal regions of Dalmatia and Istria.

In Croatia both pop and rock are popular, as well as pop music influenced by Dalmatian or Slavonian folk elements.

Since the mid-20th century, schlager and chanson-inspired music have formed the backbone of the Croatian popular music.

== History of music in Croatia ==
=== Medieval ===
The oldest preserved relics of musical culture in Croatia are sacral in nature and represented by Latin medieval liturgical chant manuscripts (approximately one hundred musical codices and fragments dating from the 11th to the 15th centuries have been preserved to date). They reveal a wealth of various influences and liturgical traditions that converged in this region (Dalmatian liturgy in Benevento script, Northern Gregorian chant, and original Glagolitic chant).

=== Renaissance and baroque ===
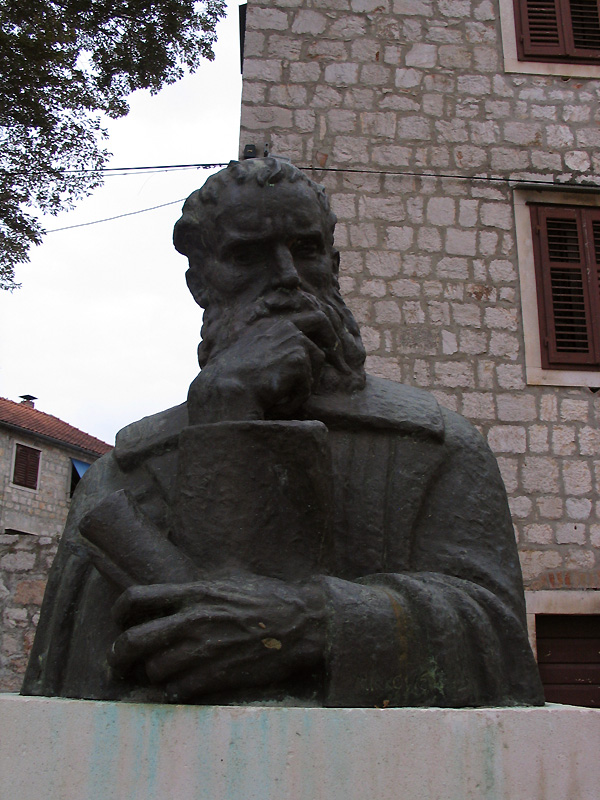
Petar Hektorović (1487–1572)

Early in the 15th century, the ideas of Humanism in Croatia brought about changes to the world of music. Interest in music began to spread outside of monastic and church walls with growing influence of new spiritual tendencies from Central European and particularly Italian cities. Humanists and philosophers promulgated new musical theories and aesthetic ideas: Federik Grisogono, Pavao Skalić, Frane Petrić. The writing down of folk and popular music began in mid-sixteenth century: in the poem Fishing and Fishermen's Talk from 1558, Petar Hektorović ingrained Neoplatonic ideals in popular music; and transcripts of Croatian musical folklore were printed in Venetian anthologies (Giulio Cesare Barbetta 1569, Marco Facoli 1588). Julije Skjavetić from Šibenik published his madrigals (Li madrigali a quattro, et a cinque voci 1562), while his Motetti a cinque et a sei voci, (1564) are characterised by a lavish polyphonic structure under the influence of the Dutch school. Music and dance were a component part of theatrical expression (Mavro Vetranović, Nikola Nalješković, Marin Držić, Marin Benetović), while the function of music and sound effects was under the influence of Italian pastorals.

The most prominent Croatian composers of this period include Ivan Lukačić, Vinko Jelić and Atanazije Jurjević.

New tendencies of early Baroque monody soon found their way into the domestic musical tradition, both sacral and secular. Tomaso Cecchini, from Verona, who spent his entire working life (1603–44) as a choirmaster, organist and composer in Split and Hvar, published his madrigals Armonici concetti, libro primo (1612) as the oldest Baroque collection written for the Croatian milieu. The collection Sacrae cantiones (Venice 1620) by Ivan Lukačić from Šibenik is valuable testimony of sacral music that was performed in Split, and is generally speaking, one of the most significant monuments of old Croatian music altogether. The Franciscans and Paulists cultivated sacral chants, mostly monophonic and without organ accompaniment (the manuscript cantos of Frane Divnić, Bone Razmilović, Filip Vlahović-Kapušvarac, Franjo Vukovarac and Petar Knežević). Also, worth mentioning is Ragusino Vincenzo Comnen, the only representative of the music of the Dubrovnik nobility.

The tradition of the Baroque was more lasting in church/sacral music, which was the musical form that was systematically nurtured in numerous monasteries (especially Franciscan ones) as well as in parish and cathedral churches. The preservation of music manuscripts and prints became a widespread practice in the mid-18th century. Simple vocal-instrumental music for two voices with organ continuo was the form most frequently performed in churches; more prominent individuals active in the sphere of music could be found only in larger urban centres. They were mostly organists and maestri di cappella, skilful composers who had small vocal and/or instrumental ensembles and who frequently acted as music teachers (private or in church schools). The gradual development of the middle class had as one of its consequences the corresponding secular organisation of musical life, particularly in the first decades of the 19th century, a period that saw the establishment of music ensembles, music societies (1827 in Zagreb, then in Varaždin, Rijeka, Osijek etc.) and music schools.

In addition, public balls and other events were organised (music academies, theatre performances) with the participation of local and foreign musicians (from Italy, Austria, Bohemia etc.) including the private collection of music materials for playing music at home. Music became a component part of various festivities, such as the arrival of important political personalities (the new governor or the Habsburg king Frances I, etc.), the feasts of patron saints (St. Blaise in Dubrovnik, St. Domnius in Split, St. Stephen in Hvar and Zagreb etc.), for which so called art music was specifically composed, with the inclusion of popular elements (bourgeois dances, folk music of the peasantry).

=== Romanticism ===
Many Italian and domestic musicians worked in Dubrovnik: in the cathedral choir and orchestra, in the Duke's orchestra, at private and public festivities. An excellent early example of pre-classical symphony and chamber music was given by Luka Sorkočević, a nobleman educated in Rome, as well as his son Antun, a historian and diplomat. Ferdo Livadić (1799–1879) wrote Notturno in F♯ minor for piano as early as 1822, which is, along with John Field's compositions under the same name, one of the earliest examples of that type of piano miniatures in general.

In the course of the 1830s, as a reflection of such tendencies in Europe, the Illyrian Movement emerged in Croatia which assigned not only to literature but to music as well a particular socio-political role: the forming and guarding of national awareness including the struggle against Hungarization and Germanization. Accordingly, in 1846 Josip Runjanin (1821–1878) put to music Antun Mihanović's 1835 poem "Horvatska domovina" (Croatian Homeland), which later became the Croatian national anthem. In such a setting Vatroslav Lisinski (1819–1854) composed the first Croatian national opera Ljubav i zloba (Love and Malice), which premièred in Zagreb in 1846.

Taking into consideration the presence of folk music, the aspirations of the Illyrians went far beyond the results achieved, something that is also continued in the work of Ivan Zajc (1832–1914) in the second half of the century. His masterpiece, the opera Nikola Šubić Zrinjski, ever since its opening night in Zagreb in 1876, had not lost in popularity, partly because its heroic patriotism functions as a symbol of Croatia's victory. Finally, owing to the founder of Croatian ethno-musicology and musical historiography, Franjo Kuhač (1834–1911), the systematic research of folklore evolved simultaneously with Zajc's endeavours. In Zajc's and Kuhač's era, major halls for musical performances and concerts were built: in Zagreb the building of the Croatian Music Institute (1876, 1895) with a concert hall, and the building of the Croatian National Theatre (1895), including the theatre buildings in Rijeka (1885), Split (1893) and Osijek (1907) where, along with the Croatian National Theatre in Zagreb, drama, opera and ballet performances are still played today.

The choral society Kolo was founded in 1862, and went on to play a central role in the cultural life of Zagreb and Croatia in Austria-Hungary and Yugoslavia.

During the 19th century, other instrumentalists and singers won international recognition, for example, the violinist Franjo Krežma (1862–1881), singers, among which Ilma Murska (1834–1889), Matilda Mallinger (1847–1920) who sang at the opening night of Wagner's Die Meistersinger von Nürnberg in 1868, Milka Trnina (1863–1941) and Josip Kašman (1850–1925), the first Croatian singer to appear at the New York Metropolitan Opera.

== Folk music ==
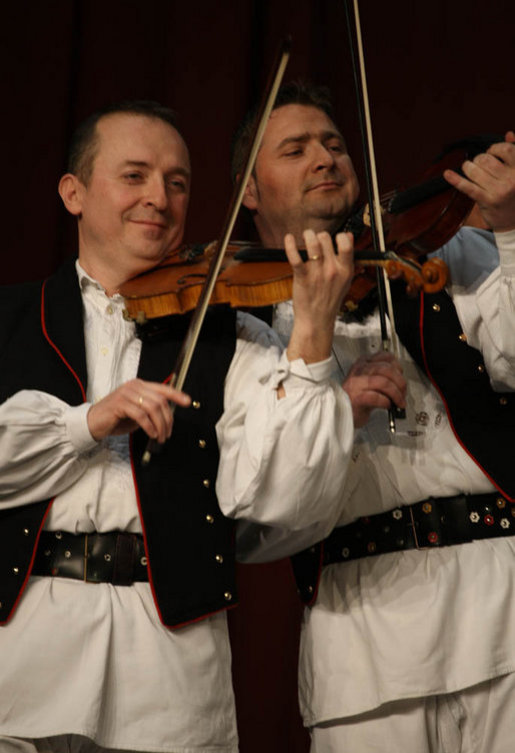
Traditional Croatian musicians play for Mrs. Laura Bush on April 7, 2008, in Zagreb.

The traditional folk music of Croatia is mostly associated with the following:

=== Ganga ===
Ganga is a type of singing which is characterized by a lone singer singing one line of lyrics and then others joining in for what can be best described as a wail. It is a very passionate form of singing, which is one of the reasons it has been limited in popularity to small towns. Even though it is a unique and autochthonous form of singing by Croats, it is very rare to hear this music on Croatian airwaves. However, several popular Croatian musicians have incorporated some ganga into their work. It can also be heard in concert music: the American composer Craig Walsh incorporates a ganga-inspired wailing, sighing, pitch-bending, micro-tonal vocal style in his 'String Quartet No. 1' (2010), a work commissioned for the Sarajevo Chamber Music Festival and the Manhattan String Quartet, the second movement of which is clearly paying homage to ganga style.

Only recently has ganga begun to address political issues, frequently adopting overtly nationalistic overtones and incorporating themes from the Croatian Homeland War. Although both men and women regularly perform ganga, it is extremely unusual for them to perform songs together. It is not unusual at all for both Catholic and Muslim men to perform ganga together.

=== Klapa ===
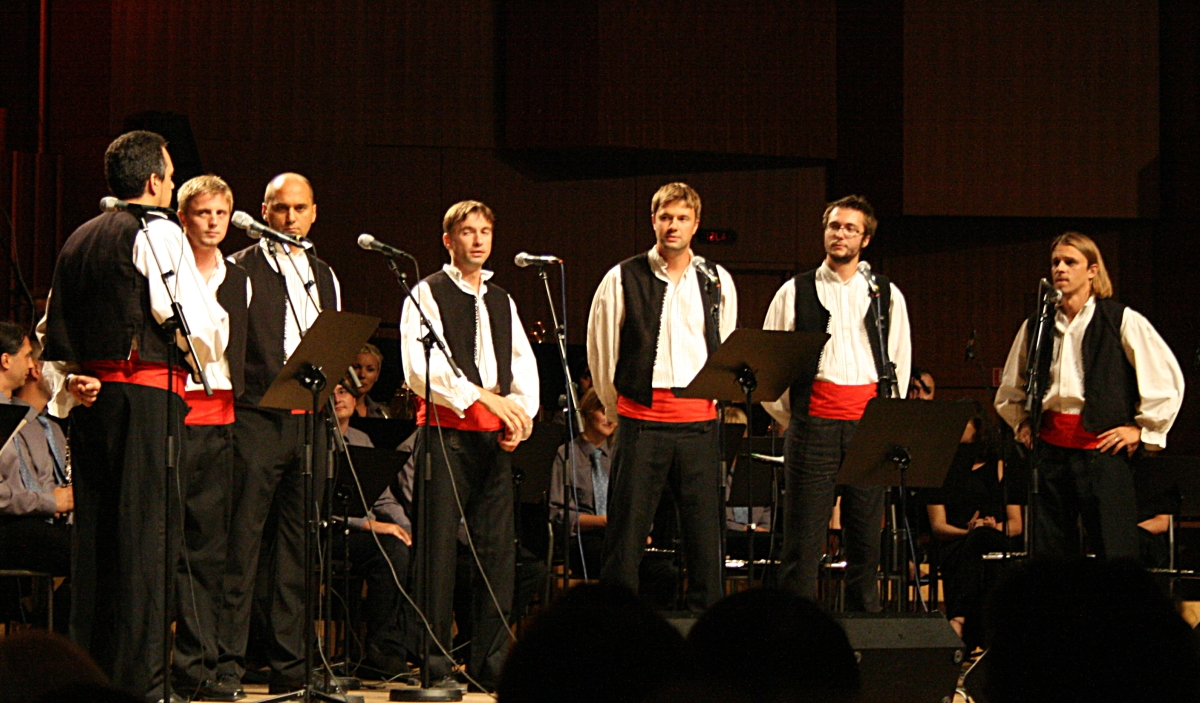
A Klapa group at a concert in Zagreb

The klapa music is a form of a cappella singing that first appeared in littoral Croatia during the middle of the 19th century. The word klapa is derived from a word in slang Italian spoken in Trieste at the time. It refers to "a group of people" and the singing style traces its roots to liturgical church singing. The motifs, in general, celebrate love, wine (grapes), country (homeland) and sea. The main elements of the music are harmony and melody, with rhythm very rarely being very important.

A klapa group consists of a first tenor, a second tenor, a baritone, and a bass. It is possible to double all the voices apart from the first tenor. Although klapa is a cappella music, on occasion, it is possible to add a gentle guitar and a mandolin.

Klapa singing has become increasingly popular in littoral Croatia. Many young people from Dalmatia treasure klapa and sing it regularly when going out eating/drinking. This music has gained popularity among mainstream audiences in coastal regions of Croatia, with newer klapa formed by younger generations fusing klapa vocals with other music styles, such as klapa Libar's metal cover of "Pusti da ti leut svira" and the pop/klapa song "Kako ću joj reć' da varin" by klapa DVD-a Žrnovnica Sv. Florijan, which won the Split Song Festival in 2010.

=== Tamburica ===
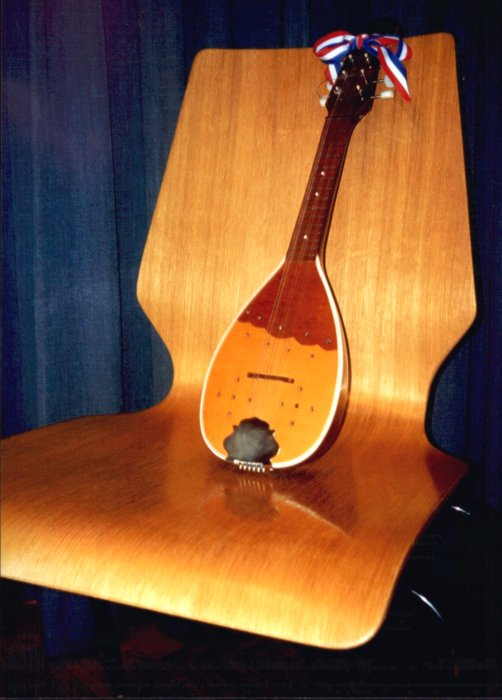
Bisernica, a traditional taburitza instrument

Tamburica (diminutive of tambura) music is a form of folk music that involves these and related string instruments. It became increasingly popular in the 1800s, and small bands began to form, paralleling similar developments in Russia, Italy and Ukraine.

The main themes of tamburitza songs are the common themes of love and happy village life. Tamburitza music is primarily associated with the northern, Pannonian part of the country. It is sometimes said that the first sextet of tambura players was formed by Pajo Kolarić of Osijek in 1847. In 1971 one of the most famous and long lasting tamburitza ensembles Slavonski Bećari was formed led by the legend of tamburitza music Antun Nikolić Tuca.

Traditional tamburitza ensembles are still commonplace, but more professional groups have formed in the last few decades. These include Zlatni dukati and Ex Panonia, the first such groups, Zdenac, Slavonske Lole, Berde Band and the modernized rock and roll-influenced Gazde.

The style of Tambura music played most often in the United States during the latter half of the 20th century was not significantly different from the style played at the turn of the 19th century. Free of the influences of pop music in Jugoslavia and the nascent, independent republics, and without large quantities of immigrants bringing new methods and styles, American-style Tambura music, and to a lesser extent, Canadian-style Tambura music stayed true to its roots.

Today, the most prevalent forms of Tambura music are folk-pop combinations.

=== Gusle ===
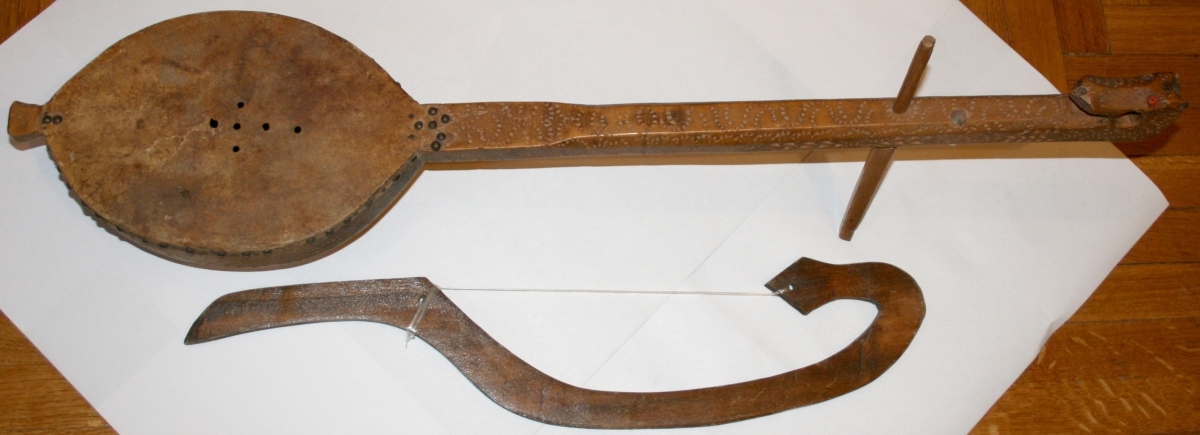
A traditional gusle instrument from Dalmatia

The gusle music is played on this traditional string instrument. It is primarily rooted in epic poetry with emphasis on important historical or patriotic events. It is the traditional instrument of inland Dalmatia and of Herzegovina, the part of Bosnia and Herzegovina with predominant Croatian population.

Gusle players are known for glorifying outlaws such as hajduks or uskoks of the long gone Turkish reign or exalting the recent heroes of the Croatian War of Independence. Andrija Kačić Miošić, a famous 18th-century author, had also composed verses in form of the traditional folk poetry (deseterac, ten verses). His book Razgovor ugodni naroda slovinskog became Croatian folk Bible which inspired numerous gusle players ever since.

As for contemporary gusle players in Croatia, one person that particularly stands out is Mile Krajina. Krajina is a prolific folk poet and gusle player who gained cult status among some conservative groups. There are also several other prominent Croatian gusle players who often perform at various folk-festivals throughout Croatia and Bosnia-Herzegovina.

Another gusle performer, Peter Boro brought Croatian music to an American audience, and is featured on the Library of Congress's California Gold: Northern California Folk Music from the Thirties Collection.

=== Diple ===
Diple is a traditional woodwind musical instrument in Croatian music. Sometimes called "Mih", "mjeh", "mjesina" or only "diple", it is played from Istria, Lika, over Dalmatia Islands and Coast to Herzegovina. "Mih" is made of tanned goat or sheep skin and consists of a "dulac" or "kanela" through which the air is blown and "diple" (chanter) on which it is played. Inside the "mih" on the chanter, two single-blade reeds are situated. Unlike bagpipes, "Mih" doesn't have a "trubanj" or "bordun" (drone). Although they are very similar, the "mih" from different parts of Croatia still differ in type of chanter, in the position of holes or in some tiny details (for example ornaments).

=== Other folk traditions ===
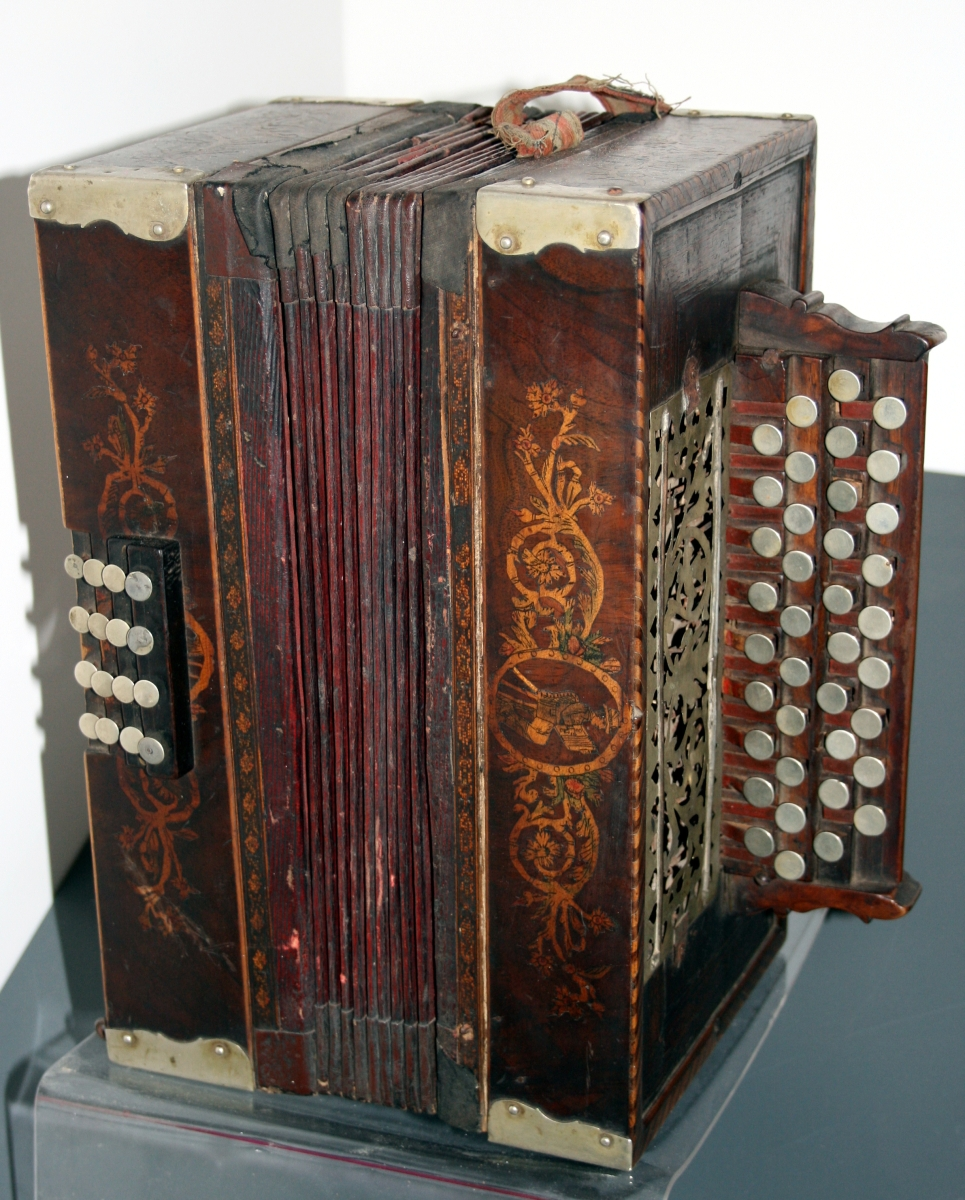
An accordion on display in Zagreb.

The folk music of Zagorje, an area north of Zagreb, is known for small orchestras consisting of Violins, Cimbule, Tamburice and Harmonike. The Tamburica (also known as tambura) is the Croatian national string instrument. Although there is a rich pool of folk songs in this region, traditions are not being cherished and most Zagorian folk music available is performed by amateur groups. This is also reflected in the quality of the music, which is mostly reduced to happy upbeat songs.

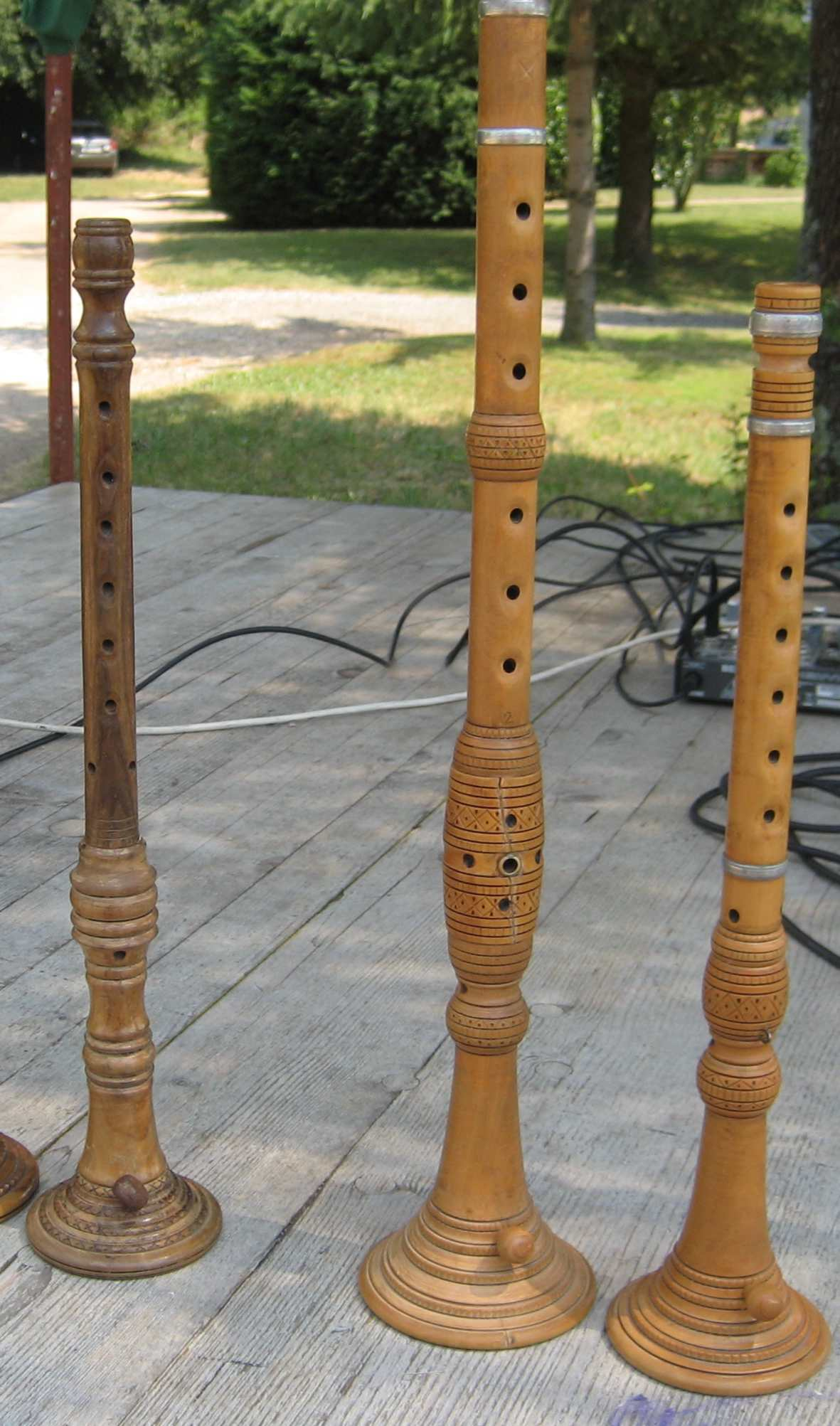
Several sopila instruments.

The folk music of Međimurje, a small but distinct region in northernmost Croatia, with its melancholic and soothing tunes became the most popular form of folk to be used in the modern ethno pop-rock songs. Beside Cimbule and Violins, there is also a tradition of Brass orchestras which used to play an important role in cultural everyday life. On one hand, they were the foundation of every regional celebration or wedding but on the other hand they were also known for playing at funerals or funeral feasts.

In Istria and Kvarner, native instruments like sopila, curla and diple make a distinctive regional sound. It is partially diatonic in nature following the unique Istrian scale.

=== Events ===
The Slavonian town Požega hosts a known folk music festival, Zlatne žice Slavonije (Golden strings of Slavonia), which has prompted musicians to compose new songs with far-reaching influences, recently including American bluegrass.

The towns of Vinkovci and Đakovo, also in Slavonia, host yearly folklore festivals (Vinkovačke jeseni and Đakovački vezovi) where folk music is also listened to as part of the tradition.

The town of Slavonski Brod holds an annual festival called Brodfest, where many of the great tamburica bands come together to play.

The Dubrovnik Summer Festival puts on dramatic music and ballet. It was founded in 1950.

The Osor Musical Evenings was founded in 1976 and takes place in July and August. It plays classical Croatian masters.

The Musical Evenings in Donat takes place during the summer in Zadar. It was founded in 1961, and plays old music.

== Popular music ==
=== Pop ===
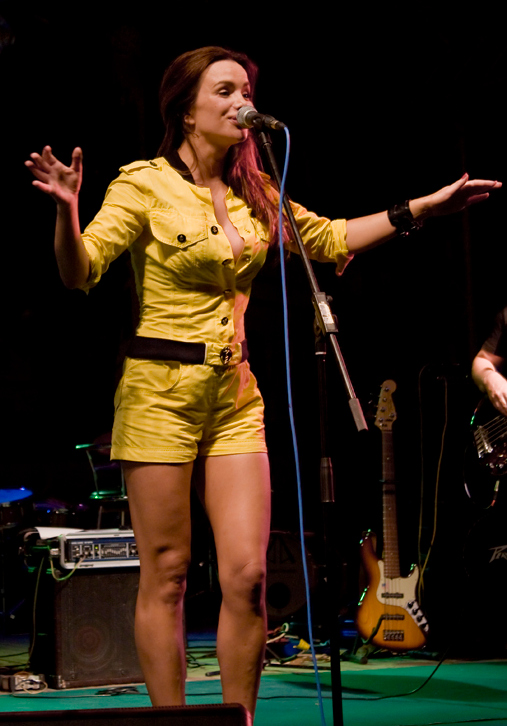
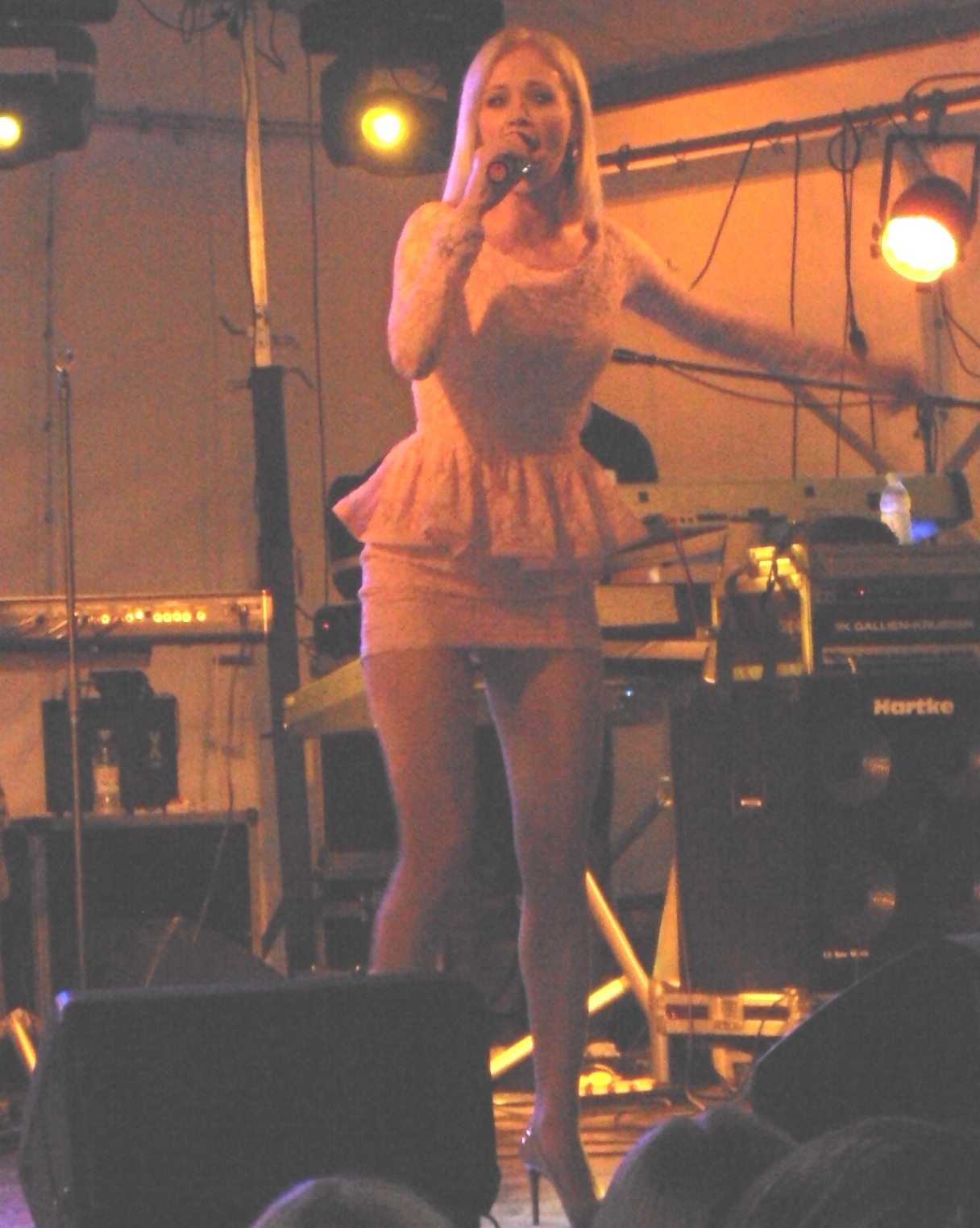
Two most popular singers of Croatian popular music, Severina on the left and Jelena Rozga on the right. They have significant amount of audience across international borders, especially in Balkan region.

The pop music of Croatia generally resembles the canzone music of Italy, while including elements of the native traditional music. Croatian record companies produce much material each year, if only to populate the numerous music festivals. Of special note is the Split Festival which usually produces the most popular summer hits.

Seasoned pop singers in Croatia include: Meri Cetinić, Mišo Kovač, Ivo Robić, Vice Vukov, Krunoslav Slabinac, Zlatko Pejaković, Arsen Dedić, Vinko Coce, Zdenka Vučković, Darko Domjan, Tereza Kesovija, Gabi Novak, Ivica Šerfezi, Oliver Dragojević, Tomislav Ivčić, Doris Dragović, Radojka Šverko, Maja Blagdan, Jacques Houdek and many others. Also, the groups Magazin, Novi fosili and Grupa 777 have had sustained careers.

In more recent times, younger performers such as Nina Badrić, Severina, Gibonni, Toni Cetinski, Jelena Rozga, Danijela, Lidija Bačić, Antonija Šola, Lana Jurčević and many others have captured the attention of the pop audience. Each of them have successfully blended various influences into their distinct music style. For example, Thompson's songs include traditional epic themes from the Dinaric regions; Severina threads between Croatian pop and a folk sound.

Croatian pop music is fairly often listened to in Slovenia, Bosnia and Herzegovina, Serbia, Montenegro and North Macedonia due to the union of Yugoslavia that existed until the 1990s. Conversely, Bosnian singers like Dino Merlin and Serbian Đorđe Balašević have an audience in Croatia, as well as some others. More recently the Turbo folk – frowned upon by the establishment some music critics and social commentators – has been popular amongst some sections of Croatian youth. A general resentment to Turbo folk remains as it is not broadcast on state radio and TV. Where on private outlets it may be transmitted, it normally triggers a strong negative reaction from those not liking it. Croatian singers that are using elements of Turbo folk are Severina and Jelena Rozga.

Croatia is a regular contestant on the Eurovision Song Contest. Back in Yugoslavia, Croatian pop group Riva won the contest in 1989. Since independence, Croatia's best finish was in 2024 with the song "Rim Tim Tagi Dim" by Baby Lasagna, finishing second and the song later going on to chart across Europe. Some of the other Croatians who performed on the ESC include Danijel Popović, Put, Boris Novković and Claudia Beni.

=== Rock ===
The most popular rock bands active during the former Yugoslavia included Haustor, Psihomodo Pop, Azra, Prljavo Kazalište and Parni Valjak.

There are several rather popular and long-lasting mainstream rock acts like Parni Valjak, Prljavo Kazalište, Crvena Jabuka, Atomsko Sklonište, Aerodrom, Tutti Frutti Band, Daleka Obala, Đavoli, Stijene, More, Osmi putnik, Metak, etc. They originated in the 1970s and 1980s, and for the better part of their career resorted to a more mellow, mainstream pop-rock sound. Of some note is also the Sarajevo school of pop rock which influenced many of these bands, and which also included singers like Željko Bebek who later worked in Croatia.

However, Croatian new wave (Novi val) movement, which exploded in 1979/80 and lasted throughout the 1980s, is considered by many to be the high-water mark of Croatian rock music, both in terms of quality and commercial success. The most influential and popular bands of Novi val were Azra, Haustor, Film, even early Prljavo Kazalište. Other notable acts were Animatori, Buldožer, Paraf, Patrola etc.

In the late 1980s, the region of Istria became home to a kind of called Ča-val, which often used the Čakavian dialect and elements of traditional music from the regions of Istria and Kvarner.

The new wave scene has collapsed by the end of the eighties, to be replaced by the newcomers like; Tutti Frutti band, Daleka Obala, Majke and Laufer. While Daleka Obala sported a pop-rock sound influenced by Novi val, Croatian pop and even Dalmatian folk, Majke were a back-to-basics, garage-rock act stylistically influenced by bands like the Black Crowes, Led Zeppelin or Black Sabbath, as well as their Serbian counterparts Partibrejkers. Laufer, led by Damir Urban (who later went on to form Urban & 4), were an early nineties alternative rock band taking their cue from the grunge movement.

Let 3 and KUD Idijoti are also prominent rock acts, popular both for their music and their interesting, often controversial, performances and stunts.

Beginning in the late 1980s, folk-rock groups also sprouted across Croatia. The first is said to be Vještice, who combined Međimurje folk music with rock and set the stage for artists like Legen, Lidija Bajuk and Dunja Knebl. At the same time on the other side of Croatia, in Istria, a band called Gustafi started playing their own strange amalgamate of rock and Istrian folk, but it took them more than a decade to reach the nationwide audience.

The Split metal band Osmi Putnik has also been a success in Croatia and still are today and are also popular in other ex-Yugoslav republics

The Sisak surf rock band The Bambi Molesters has in the past years gained sizeable international fame and are often touted as one of the best surf-rock acts in the world today.

Alternative rock/metal band Father have had success with their first album inspirita in countries like the UK, and have toured with bands like Korn, Anthrax and Apocalyptica.

There is also a number of Croatian bands who play modern music in English, most prominent being My Buddy Moose, The orange strips, In-the-go, Kimiko, Cold Snap and Snovi

=== Dance ===
Dance music in Croatia was an offspring of the local pop music and more Western influences. It developed during the late 1980s and early 1990s, picking up on the trends such as euro disco and eurodance. It also spawned a wave of electronic music artists, mostly house, techno and trance.

Dino Dvornik is one of the pioneers of electronic music in Croatian.

The singer Vanna rose to prominence through the dance trio E.T., and the music of Vesna Pisarović has a fair bit of dance beat.

Although E.T. still operates, they've changed singers several times and lost in popularity. The band Colonia is perhaps the only one that rode the dance wave of the '90s and today is one of the most popular performers in Croatia.

=== Rap ===
The 1990s were marked by the emergence of Croatian rap music. The Ugly Leaders released the first ever Croatian Hip-Hop album, and gained a strong following in and around Rijeka. In 1991, the Croatian Liberation Front released two widely popular protest singles. The first rap band to gain widespread and lasting acclaim was The Beat Fleet (TBF) from Split, whose members took inspiration from harsh economic and social conditions of war-torn Dalmatia, not that different from American inner cities. Their act was followed by a multitude of artists and groups in Zagreb, taking inspiration from American gangsta rap. The Zagreb rappers Bolesna Braća (also called Sick Rhyme Sayazz) and Tram 11 became particularly popular, and to an extent also the duo Nered & Stoka.

The Croatian rap gained much from the fact Edo Maajka, a Bosnian rapper, signed on to a label in Zagreb. Recently a rapper known as Shorty gained much popularity by having songs with a strong regional flavour of his native Vinkovci. The Zagreb band Elemental also entered the scene featuring one of the few Croatian female rappers.

=== Other ===
The tendency to combine different elements also has a long presence in more classical music: the opera Ero s onoga svijeta, written by Jakov Gotovac in the 1930s, blended the traditional music of the Dinaric peoples into a scholarly form and achieved great success.

== Classical ==
Classical musicians and compositions by Croatian composers are generally not well known worldwide despite having produced a huge and interesting contribution over many centuries. Influences of style were often taken from neighbouring influences (Italy, Austria) or settlers (in the Mediterranean Croatia from Italy, and in Panonia (north Croatia) from Germany and Bohemia).

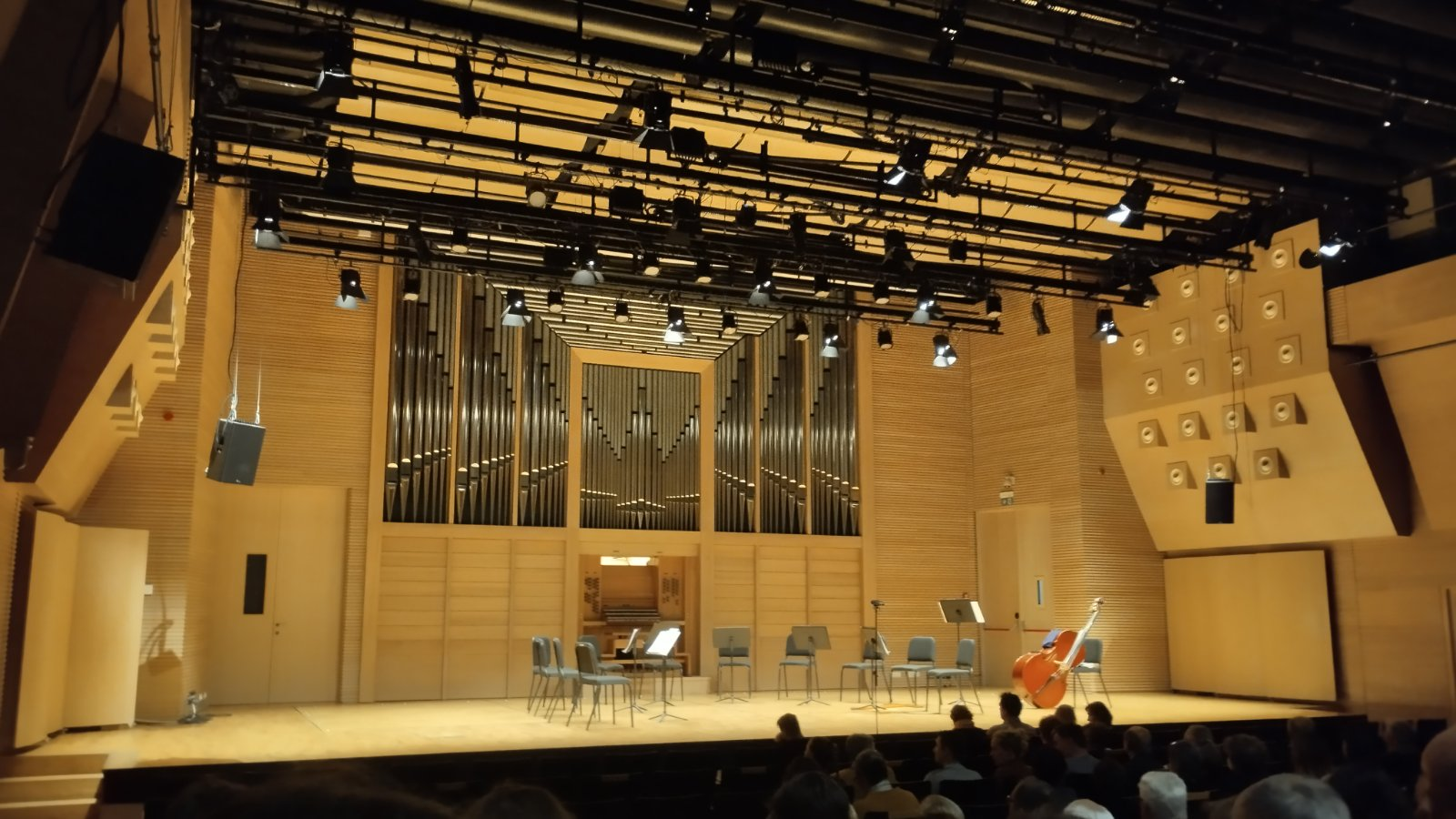
Blagoje Bersa Concert Hall of Zagreb Music Academy.

Croatian composers by current relevance in a global framework: (Maybe the order will change in the future, given that 95% of the composition exists as a single copy – the original manuscript, and yet need to be saved from oblivion, and then be performed and recorded on CD, and then presented to the international public)

- Vatroslav Lisinski (born as Ignaz Fuchs) considered as the founder of the Croatian nationalist music composed the first Croatian national opera Ljubav i Zloba (Love and Malice) and national opera Porin. Was a composer of great potential, but lived in a wrong time in a wrong place, and was a victim of politically based intrigues.
- Ivan Zajc (born as Giovanni von Zaytz) composed a series of operas in Italian, German and Croatian language. The music bears the features of authentic Italian melodics, since he grew up in a Croatian-Italian town Fiume (present-day Rijeka). His many instrumental compositions are unknown to the public, and yet need to be explored by musicologists and then published.
- Josip Hatze is the author of the first Croatian mass (ca. 1895) and the first Croatian cantata (Night on Una, 1902).
- Dora Pejačević (born as Theodora Pejacsevich) – one of the composers to introduce the orchestral song to Croatian music. Her Symphony in F♯ minor is considered by scholars to be the first modern symphony in Croatian Music.
- Blagoje Bersa (born as Benito Bersa) is a typical figure of late Romantic stylistic crisis, the author of 'futuristic' opera Der Eisenhammer / Oganj (Zagreb, 1911).
- Fran Lhotka (alternative spelling: Franz Lhotka) – ballet The Devil in the Village; Violin Concerto;
- Rudolf Matz (alternative spelling: Rudolph Matz) – School for the Violoncello; Concerto for Flute and Strings; Concertino in Modo Antico for Violoncello and Strings;
- Božidar Kunc – Piano Concerto; piano sonatas; songs for voice and piano;
- Franjo Dugan – works for organ; Violin Sonata;
- dr. Božidar Širola – wrote numerous high-quality compositions, some of which were performed just once and then fell into oblivion, probably because of political reasons. The majority – if not all of them – were never given a modern-day performance
- Boris Papandopulo
- Stjepan Šulek – the symphonies; Sonata for Trombone and Piano 'Vox Gabrieli';
- Josip Štolcer Slavenski Sonata for Violin and Piano; Slavonic Dances for Piano;
- Drago Kocakov – composed the only Croatian sonata for a classy ensemble made up of two violins – the violin duo
- Julije Bajamonti
- Julije Skjavetić
- Ivan Lukačić
- Luka Sorkočević

Modern composers:

- Ivo Josipović
- Milko Kelemen
- Pavel Dešpalj
- Ivo Malec
- Stanko Horvat
- Marko Ruždjak
- Dubravko Detoni
- Igor Kuljerić
- Darko Hajsek

Croatian society of composers (Hrvatsko drustvo skladatelja – HDS) is the main organization promoting modern classical music in Croatia.

== Jazz ==
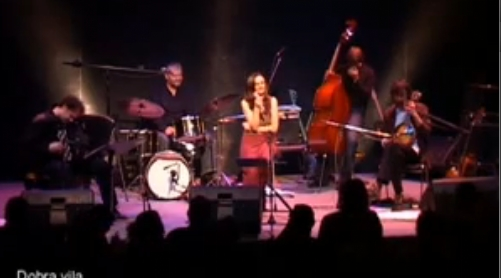
Croatian Istrian jazz singer Tamara Obrovac performing.

Jazz appeared in Croatia in the 1920s, and flourished in Zagreb by the late 2000s, making it a regional center for jazz. In 1947, the jazz orchestra of Radio Zagreb was founded, which lives on today as the "HRT Big Band." In 1959, vibraphone player Boško Petrović, who was likely the most famous Croatian jazz musician, founded the Zagreb Jazz Quartet. Today, there is a fair number of active jazz groups in Croatia, and various cities host jazz festivals. Jazz has left its mark on the Croatian pop scene throughout the years, most notably in the works of Drago Diklić and occasionally Josipa Lisac.

== Christian music ==
Croatian Catholic priests of Dalmatia, Istria and Kotor sang in Church Slavonic language during the 9th and 10th centuries, from which formed different forms of individual or choral spiritual music. The first inscription about that kind of singing dates from 1177, when it was sung laudibus and canticis "in eorum sclavica lingua" to Pope Alexander II during his visit in Zadar.

Very famous is repertory of church verses Cithara octochorda, which was published three times (Vienna: 1701, 1723 and Zagreb: 1757). It contains Christian music inheritance of Croats, both Kajkavian and Latin verses. Those verses set to music and adapted to organs famous Croatian church music composers Albe Vidaković, Anđelko Klobučar and others. That arrangement is part of Catholic liturgy in Croatia today. Croatian church composers (Peran, Vidaković, Klobučar) composed so-called Croatian Masses, which also become regular part of liturgy.

EffaTha is the first Croatian Christian metal band. Christian pop is very popular among Croatian Catholic youth, especially bands such as Emmanuel, Božja pobjeda (God's Victory) and Srce Isusovo (Heart of Jesus).

The most famous contemporary Christian music singers and composers are Dragutin Hrastović, Čedo Antolić, Alen Hržica, Nika Vlahović, Husar and Palić sisters. Some pop singers like Nina Badrić and Tajči were also affiliated with Christian music, as much as Meri Cetinić who composed spiritual songs.

== See also ==
- Croatia Songs
- List of radio stations in Croatia
- Popular music in the Socialist Federal Republic of Yugoslavia
- Music of Yugoslavia
- Croatian art
- Gunjac
