= Target (rapper) =

- Born: Nenad Šimun
- Origin: Zagreb, Croatia
- Genre: Hip hop
- Occupation: Rapper
- Years active: 1994–present
- Label: Menart
- Member of: Tram 11

Nenad Šimun, also known by his stage names Target or Mladi Gospar, is a Croatian rapper.

== Career ==
He began his career in 1994. He was first in a group called "Young Lordz" but they disbanded in 1996 and soon he and General Woo formed a duo called Tram 11. As part of Tram 11 he became one of the best Croatian rappers up until 2003 when he went solo. He is best known for his songs "Mokri snovi", "Ritam Grada", "Furam obleku" and "Stavi ovo na roštilj". He is the head of his own label WorkshopClass.

== Discography ==
With Young Lordz

- 1995: Demo EP
- 1996: Wake Up

As part of Blackout Project

- 1996: Blackout Project - Project Imposible
- 1998: Blackout Freestyle 98 cassette
- 2000: Blackout 2000

With Tram 11

- 1996: Verbalator (DEMO TAPE)
- 1999: Čovječe ne ljuti se
- 2000: Vrućina gradskog asfalta
- 2003: Tajna crne kutije
- 2022: Jedan i jedan

With PR9

- 2006: Piratski radio 9 (demo EP)

Solo albums

- 2003: MC Demo
- 2005: The Album nastavak
- 2009: Još jedan dan u Zagrebu

Mixtapes

- 1998: WorkshopClass Volume 11
- 1999: Domačice
- 2000: Workshopclass volume 1
- 2000: Workshopclass volume 2
- 2006: 10 Yearz Of...
- 2007: Prva Petorka Mixtape
- 2010: Futuring Mixtape
- 2010: DSP All-Stars Pokradi Beat Mixtape
- 2012: Direkt
- 2012: Mladi Gospar Mixtape
- 2015: Verse Vs Verse
- 2017: Made in Cro
