= 2000 (disambiguation) =

2000 was a century leap year starting on Saturday of the Gregorian calendar.

2000 may also refer to:

- Year 2000 problem
- 2000 (number)
- Video 2000, a consumer videocassette system and analogue recording standard
- Lever 2000, a soap brand owned by Unilever
- 2000 CR_{105}, the tenth most distant known object in the Solar System
- a postal code in Antwerp, Belgium
- a postal code in Frederiksberg, Denmark
- 2000, the postcode of Sydney central business district, Australia
- Windows 2000, operating system
- Microsoft Office 2000, a version of Microsoft Office
- X 2000, high-speed trains in Sweden
- Quasar 2000, a Czech hang glider design

== Music ==
- 2000 (Grand Puba album), 1995
- 2000 (Joey Badass album), 2022
- 2000 B.C. (Before Can-I-Bus), a 2000 album by rapper Canibus
- Cusco 2000, an album by the German cross-cultural new age band Cusco
- 2000 (EP), an EP by Ugly Leaders
- "2000" (song), a 2009 song by Swedish band Kent
- 2000 Won, a South Korean band

== Media ==
- AD 2000, a Catholic traditionalist magazine
- 2000 AD (comics), a British science-fiction comic book
- ABC 2000 Today, a worldwide televised broadcast welcoming the year 2000 with Peter Jennings
- 2000 Today a worldwide televised event to welcome 2000 led by the BBC and WGBH
- Double Dare 2000, an American television game show
- 2000FM (Sydney), a radio station with the callsign 2OOO
- Radio 2000, a South African radio station
- 2000 Plus, a 1950s American radio series

== Transportation ==
- Rail 2000, a large-scale project of the Swiss Federal Railways
- Budd SPV-2000, a diesel multiple unit railcar
- Lok 2000, a series of modern four-axle electric locomotives
- Dacia 2000, an executive hatchback
- Steyr 2000, a passenger car sold in Austria
- Alfa Romeo 2000, a luxury car
- RAM 2000, a light armored vehicle designed by IAI RAMTA
- Pontiac 2000, a compact car
- Triumph 2000, a mid-size executive car
