= General Woo =

Croatian rapper

- Born: Srđan Ćuk; 17 November 1977 (age 48); Vukovar, SR Croatia, Yugoslavia
- Genres: Hip-hop
- Occupation: Rapper
- Years active: 1994–present
- Labels: Menart (1996–2003), Moriss (2003–2006), Croatia Records (2006–2010), Aquarius (2010–present)

Srđan Ćuk (born November 17, 1977) known better by his stage name, General Woo, is a Croatian rapper.

== Life and Career ==
He began his career in 1994. He is currently signed to Aquarius Records. In 1999 he was part of one of the first successful rap acts in Croatia, Tram 11.

General Woo was born in and lives in Vukovar, where he also started organizing an open-air hip-hop festival in 2007. He hosts a Hip-Hop radio station called Blackout Radio Vukovar in his home town of Vukovar. In 2011 he released his fourth studio album Verbalni Delikt on MTV's web site on free download. In 2014 his fifth studio album called Pad Sistem (Fall of the System) came out.

== Albums ==
Solo albums

- 2002 - Takozvani(So called)
- 2005 - Baš je lijep ovaj svijet (with Nered) (What a Beautiful World)
- 2006 - Krv nije voda (Blood is Not Water)
- 2011 - Verbalni delikt
- 2014 - Pad sistema (Fall of The System)

Demo's

- 1994: - General Woo (Demo)
- 1996: - Verbalator (Demo)
- 1998: - WorkshopCLASS Volume#11

As part of Tram 11

- 1999 - Čovječe ne ljuti se
- 2000 - Vrućina gradskog asfalta
- 2003 - Tajna crne kutije
- 2022 - Jedan i jedan

As part of Blackout Project

- 1996 - Project Impossible
- 2000 - Blackout 00
