= Channel Is Deep & Beech =

Studio album by Ugly Leaders
- Released: 1992
- Recorded: 1988–1992
- Genre: Hip hop
- Length: 51:32
- Label: Channel Records, Damn Good Records & Superfreek Productions
- Producer: Ugly Leaders

Ugly Leaders chronology
Channel Is Deep & Beech (1992)	Prisoners of Pain (1994)

Singles from 2000 EP
- 1. "Ugly Leaders Are Funny" Released: 1992; 2. "Hardcore" Released: 1992; 3. "Panonian Beech" Released: 1993

Channel is Deep & Beech is the first album of Croatian hip hop group, Ugly Leaders. It is also the first Croatian hip hop album. The album was released in 1992.

== Track listing ==
No.	Title	Producer	Length
1.	"Nitro"	Damn Jay, Condom X	0:54
2.	"Ugly Leaders are funny"	Dj Pimp, Condom X	4:31
3.	"Povratak na Brežuljak" (featuring Freek Tha Ho)	Damn Jay, Condom X	3:52
4.	"Who's That Pimpin' On My Window"	Dj Pimp, DJ-R 33 Rock	5:14
5.	"Srpski Panduri 2" (featuring Prof. Doke)	Damn Jay, Condom X, DJ-R 33 Rock	6:42
6.	"Whiskey & Echo Coffe"	Damn Jay, Condom X	4:15
7.	"Hardcore"	Damn Jay, DJ-R 33 Rock	5:06
8.	"Suckah Elementary pt. 1&2" (featuring MC Buffalo)	Condom X, Dj Pimp	5:23
9.	"Good, Bad & Ugly"	DJ-R 33 Rock	4:59
10.	"Soli Contro Tutti" (featuring Freek Tha Ho)	DJ-R 33 Rock	2:58
11.	"D.J.R. Is Dead"	DJ-R 33 Rock	1:03
12.	"Panonian Beech pt. 1&2"	Dj Pimp, Davor Tolja	6:32
