= Verbalni delikt =

Studio album by General Woo
- Released: 11 November 2011
- Recorded: 2010–2011
- Genre: Hip-hop
- Length: 65:00
- Label: Aquarius
- Producer: Sett, Phezz beatz

General Woo chronology
Krv nije voda (2006)	Verbalni delikt (2011)	Pad sistema (2014)

Verbalni delikt is an album by Croatian rapper General Woo. The album was released as a digital download on 11 October 2011 on MTV's web site.

The album features artists such as Ivana Husar, Brka and Kandžija. The album's singles are "Znam" and "Ništa se ne mijenja".

== Track listing ==
1. Zašto sada šutite
2. Poruka (skit)
3. Nikad neće biti bolje
4. Ne mora bit tako
5. Kad se prošetam Balkanom (feat. Brka & Frenkie)
6. Ništa se ne mijenja (feat. Ivana Husar)
7. Banksteri
8. Uvod u repchugu (skit)
9. Repchuga
10. Vjeruj mi
11. Mene boli kurac
12. Eugenika (feat. Magellano)
13. Kraj priče (skit)
14. Probudi se
15. Trojstvo ljudskog straha (feat. Kandžija & Sett)
16. Ne prepuštam se
17. J.P.K.P.
18. U trenutku istine
19. Užarena masa (skit)
20. Znam
21. Zaustavimo nasilje
22. Mene boli kurac (Remix) (feat. Zelenko)
23. Ne Spominjem Rat (Hidden Track)

== Sources ==
- Možda je sada pravo vrijeme da se bude ljut (in Croatian)
