= Shorty (Croatian rapper) =

Croatian rapper (born 1980)

- Also known as: Shorty, Dado
- Born: Dalibor Bartulović; June 27, 1980 (age 46); Vinkovci, Croatia
- Genre: Hip hop
- Occupation: Rapper
- Instrument: Vocals
- Years active: 1998-
- Labels: Aquarius Records; Croatia Records (2008-)
- Website: www.aquarius-records.com

Shorty, born Dalibor Bartulović, is a Croatian rapper from Vinkovci. He released his debut album in 2004 under the name 1,68 and became famous with his two records "Zeka" and "Dođi u Vinkovce".

== Biography ==
=== Early life ===
Dalibor was born and raised in Vinkovci, Croatia, and became interested in hip hop from a young age. He started to write rap lyrics in 1998. In 1999, he started to freestyle on the local radio station VFM on a show called Black Thing. A year later (2000) he was a co-former of a hip-hop group called B2. They made the greatest hip-hop demo group hit record produced by Shot (of Elemental) with the featuring of SADE and Remi (of Elemental). He was a guest on the "8 Mile Freestyle Battle" live show held in Zagreb, in club Aquarius (in 2002). Shortly after, the group B2 fell apart and Shorty started his solo career and formed a new hip-hop group with Saba and DJ Makro Polo called Bon-Ton. At the end of 2003, he started to make records in MORRIS studio (owned by Miro Vidović) for his debut album.

=== Success ===
At Aquarius Records, Shorty released 1,68 in 2004 with his hit records "Zeka" (with guest-appearance of Duško Čurlić), "Dođi u Vinkovce" featured by Miroslav Štivić, "Apel za mir" featured by Edo Maajka and "Božićna" featured by Remi. After three years with no records, he released his second album called Moj jedini način. The entire second album is dedicated to Shorty's cousin Tomislav "Tomi" Bartulović who was born in 1980 and died in 2005. The last track on the album talks about Shorty's love and relationship with his cousin Tomi. In song, Shorty raps: "i na kraju jos bih ti htio reci hvala, moj braticu Tomi, bila te je cast poznavat'" ("and in the end I'd also like to say thank you, my cousin Tomi, it's been an honor to know you"). In 2007 he married Ana Ambrenac.

== Discography ==
=== 1,68 ===
2004, Aquarius Records. Produced by DJ Makro Polo, Dražen Kvočić, and Tomo Žaper.

No.	Title	Featured Guest(s)	Length
1.	"Intro"		1:30
2.	"1,68 - metaršezdesetosam"		3:23
3.	"Zeka"	Duško Čurlić	4:16
4.	"MC"		3:43
5.	"Izdanje s Banje"	Mirza Tetarić	3:54
6.	"Ti si mi sve"	General Woo and Andrea Čubrić	4:45
7.	"Iza mene"		4:15
8.	"To je Hip Hop"		3:56
9.	"Tuga (Čemu tuga čemu bol)"	Berislav Crnković	3:28
10.	"Apel za mir"	Edo Maajka	4:36
11.	"Među nama"		3:02
12.	"Evergreen"	Baby Dooks	3:56
13.	"Dođi u Vinkovce"	Miroslav Štivić	4:59
14.	"Politika je kurva"	SABA	4:09
15.	"Hit"	Mirza Tetarić	4:01
16.	"Božićna"	Remi (of Elemental)	4:12

=== Moj jedini način ===
2007, Aquarius Records. Produced by Koolade, Dash, Baby Dooks, and Makro Polo

#	Title	Producer(s)	Featured Guest(s)	Time
1	"Intro"			1:59
2	"Moj jedini način"	Shalla		3:08
3	"Heroji danas"	Nace		4:05
4	"Broj jedan"	Dash		4:32
5	"Brakolomac"	Koolade		3:28
6	"Kad igram ne gubim"	Dash		3:20
7	"Samo ritam"	Koolade		3:56
8	"Marija"	Dash	Vlatka Kopić-Tena	5:12
9	"Sa dna"	Dash		3:47
10	"Klapa (skit)"			0:44
11	"U laži su kratki noge"	Dash		3:10
12	"Kratki radio (skit)"			1:05
13	"Narodna"	Baby Dooks		3:24
14	"Opusti se i uživaj"	Brka	Brka and Aky	3:27
15	"Tebe nema"	Makro Polo		4:05

=== Veličina nije bitna ===
In 2009, Shorty released his third album Veličina nije bitna.

#	Title	Guests	Length
1	"Dobro jutro"		4:00
2	"Još jedan zagrljaj"	Colonia	4:14
3	"Moje sranje"	Aky	3:49
4	"Žuti tisak"	Stoka	3:09
5	"Kad navale Kinezi"		3:45
6	"Sanjaj sad"	Jacques Houdek	5:05
7	"Sve mu dugujem"		3:47
8	"Ne vjeruj mi"	The Karambol	3:12
9	"Dok Dunav ..."	Miroslav Štivić	5:15
10	"Shaban"		3:37
11	"Miris juga"		3:23
12	"Molitva i zakletva"	Zaprešić Boys	4:37
