= Mile Krajina =

Mile Krajina (c. 15th of November 1923 – 15 October 2014) was a noted gusle player from Croatia, who sang traditional folk songs.

Many of his songs were about his birthplace Oklaj in the Cetina region. He mentions reading the works of famous Croatian poet Andrija Kačić Miošić in primary school as an early influence for his poems and songs. As late as August 2009, he continued to perform for folklore festivals around the country.

He was known for referring to current topics in his songs and for his performances within the scope of political rallies or commemorations.

He died at Osijek, in 2014.

== Works ==
- Guslarske Pjesme i pjesnički zapisi. "Zrinski"; Zagreb, 1986
- Vukovare, hrvatski viteže. "Zrinski"; Zagreb, 1994. ISBN 953-155-009-3
- Hrvatske pobjede. Zrinski; Zagreb, 1998. ISBN 953-155-041-7
- Hrvatski vitezovi, prijatelji i događaji. Zagreb, 2001.

== See also ==
- Music of Croatia
