= Rebrovići =

- Village
- Location within Croatia
- Coordinates: 45°14′N 15°21′E
- Country: Croatia
- County: Karlovac County
- City: Tounj

Area
  - Total: 16.7 km^{2} (6.4 sq mi)

Population (2021)
  - Total: 179
  - Density: 10.7/km^{2} (27.8/sq mi)
- Time zone: UTC+1 (CET)
  - Summer (DST): UTC+2 (CEST)
- Postal code: 47264
- Area code: +385 047

Rebrovići is a village in Croatia, under the Tounj municipality, in Karlovac County.
