= Tounj =

- Municipality
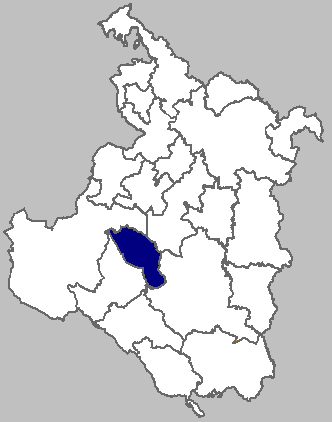
- Map of Tounj municipality within Karlovac County

- Location of Tounj in Croatia
- Coordinates: 45.252829°N 15.326023°E
- Country: Croatia
- County: Karlovac County

Area
  - Municipality: 96.1 km^{2} (37.1 sq mi)
  - Urban: 12.0 km^{2} (4.6 sq mi)

Population (2021)
  - Municipality: 1,002
  - Density: 10.4/km^{2} (27.0/sq mi)
  - Urban: 323
  - Urban density: 26.9/km^{2} (69.7/sq mi)
- Website: tounj.hr

Tounj is a village and a municipality in Karlovac County, Croatia. In the 2011 census, the total population was 1,150, in the following settlements:

The fountain near the bridge has provided water continuously since 1847 without interruption and is safe to drink from.

The bridge of Tounj is the only bridge with two levels in Croatia. The first level was built by the Roman Empire.

== History ==
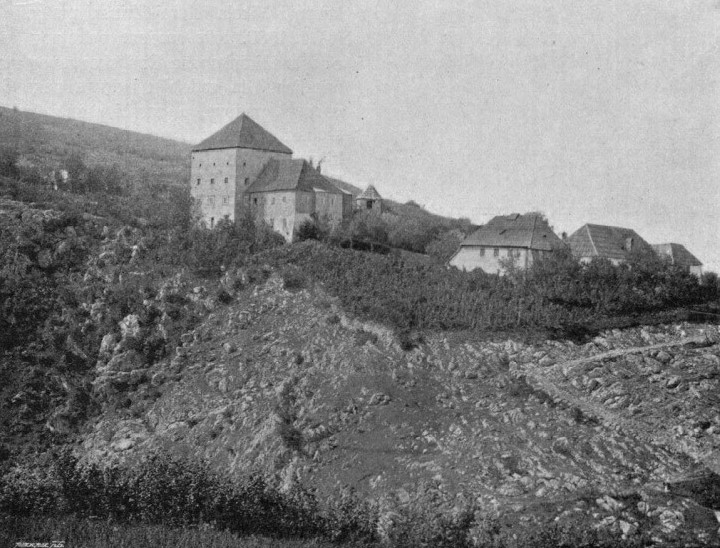
The Old Town of Tounj, early 20th century

At the bottom of the craggy Krpel in a deep ravine there is a cave from which the Tounjčica river springs . According to historians, three families defended themselves against the Turks in that cave: Fumić, Juraić and Rebrović. The cave was walled and arranged for defense, with loopholes and exits to the upper cave, which is hidden from view in the bushes and thickets. The aforementioned three families built the town of Tounj.

Tounj was first mentioned on 22 February 1481 in a document freeing the citizens of Grič from tariffs in the domains of Stjepan III Frankopan Modruški, its first recorded owner.

Prince Stjepan's grandson, also named Stjepan, added the town of Tounj to his property in 1550 when he divided it with the Zrinski family.

=== Military Frontier ===
In 1558, a confiscation delegation found the town neglected and empty, annexed it to the Krajina administration, and repopulated it in 1577. In 1585, Captain Stjepan Gucić spent considerable funds on the development of the town due to the increasingly frequent incursions of the Turks.

In the 16th century, Tounj became a part of the Austrian Military Frontier, with its own Tounj Capitanate. Known captains include:

1. Juraj Hadrčić (1580), burgrave
2. Štefan Gusić (1584–1589)
3. Vuk II Krsto Frankopan (1605)
4. Oktavijan Paner (1613)
5. Jakov Paradaiser (1622, †1628)
6. Adam Gall von Gallenstein (1628)
7. Péter IV Erdődy (1630, †1638)
8. Krištof Delišimunović (1648)
9. Johann Ernst von Paradeiser (1653)
10. Juraj V Frankopan (1653, †1601)
11. Fran II Krsto Frankopan (1665)
12. Georg Sigismund von Paradeiser (1669)
13. Ivan Juraj Gusić (1673, †1689)
14. Franjo Karlo Gusić (1689)
15. Sigismund Albrecht Herberstein (1689, †1690)
16. Maximilian von Paradeiser (1690)
17. Ernst Kulmer (1692)
18. Franjo Josip Turn (1715)
19. Graf Starhenberg (1719)
20. Chavalier Troilo Conti (1719)
21. Ivan Josip Karasman (1725)
22. Georg von Herberstein (1726)
23. Friedrich von Hallerstein (1732)

With the construction of the Karlovac Fortress, Tounj became even more important for the defense of Karlovac. In 1609, the king issued an order to Ban Toma Erdödy to hand over the town of Tounj to the Frankopan princes of Tržač, but this did not happen because the locals did not want to hand over the town without the knowledge of their captain. In 1639, the imperial engineer for the supervision of fortifications found the commander, Count Petar Erdödy, in Tounj, who lived in the main tower.

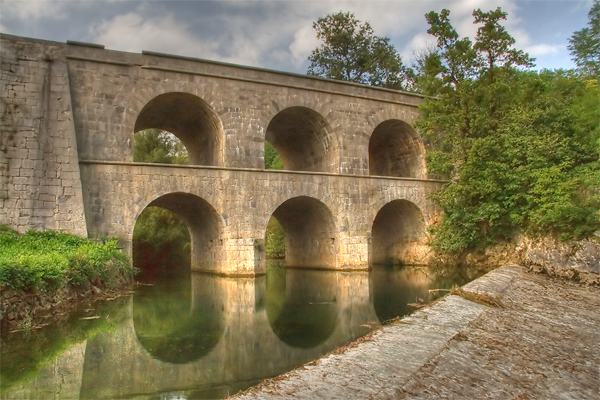
The bridge of Tounj

== Demographics ==
In 1895, the obćina of Tounj (court at Tounj), with an area of 50 square kilometres (19 mi^{2}), belonged to the kotar of Ogulin (Ogulin court and electoral district) in the županija of Modruš-Rieka (Ogulin high court and financial board). There were 440 houses, with a population of 2644. Its 6 villages and 5 hamlets were divided for taxation purposes into 2 porezne obćine, under the Ogulin office.

Settlements:

- Gerovo Tounjsko, population 55
- Kamenica Skradnička, population 266
- Potok Tounjski, population 71
- Rebrovići, population 184
- Tounj, population 346
- Tržić Tounjski, population 18
- Zdenac, population 210

In the 2011 census, 98% of the inhabitants were Croats.

== Bibliography ==
- Fras, Franz Julius (1835). "Thouiner-Kompagnie" [Tounj Company]. Vollständige Topographie der Karlstädter-Militärgrenze mit besonderer Rücksicht auf die Beschreibung der Schlösser, Ruinen, Inscriptionen und andern dergleichen Ueberbleibseln von Antiquitäten: nach Anschauung und aus den zuverlässigsten Quellen dargestellt für reisende, und zur Förderung der Vaterlandsliebe (in German). Zagreb: Franz Suppan. pp. 319–324.
