= Prisoners of Pain =

Studio album by Ugly Leaders
- Released: 1994
- Recorded: 1993–1994
- Genre: Hip hop, rock
- Length: 46:36
- Label: Deynken Music, Croatia Records
- Producer: DJ Pimp & Gigi

Ugly Leaders chronology
Channel Is Deep & Beech (1992)	Prisoners of Pain (1994)	2000EP (2000)

Singles from Prisoners of Pain
- 1. "Svijet za Nas (RMX)" Released: 1994; 2. "Drop Your Pussy" Released: 1994

Prisoners of pain is the second album by the Croatian hip hop group, Ugly Leaders. The album was released in 1994 by Croatia Records and Deynken Music.

== Controversy ==
The album had controversy due to its lyrics and language. Croatian radio stations didn't play the album because of its vulgar language and themes. Half the songs were taped on English so group could use their freedom of expression and still get played on the radio and TV.

== Track listing ==
No.	Title	Producer	Length
1.	"Drill at Will (Pain)"	DJ Pimp & Gigi	4:22
2.	"Apokalipsa"	DJ Pimp & Gigi	3:32
3.	"Pali Radio"	DJ Pimp & Gigi	3:17
4.	"Check Out My Nine" (featuring AD Skylab)	DJ Pimp & Gigi	4:14
5.	"Svijet za Nas (RMX)" (featuring Laufer)	DJ Pimp & Gigi	5:14
6.	"Overdose"	DJ R-33 Rock & Gigi	3:36
7.	"Drop Your Pussy"	DJ Pimp & Gigi	5:18
8.	"Pusa sa Distorzijom"	DJ Pimp & Gigi	3:42
9.	"Overbass"	Richard Lenac	3:03
10.	"DJ je Pijan" (featuring Dubravko Jagatić)	DJ Pimp & Gigi	2:30
11.	"PH. Sex"	DJ Pimp & Sex	4:24
12.	"I Still Got My Condom Medium"	DJ Pimp & Gigi	3:22
