= Ugly Leaders =

Croatian hip-hop group

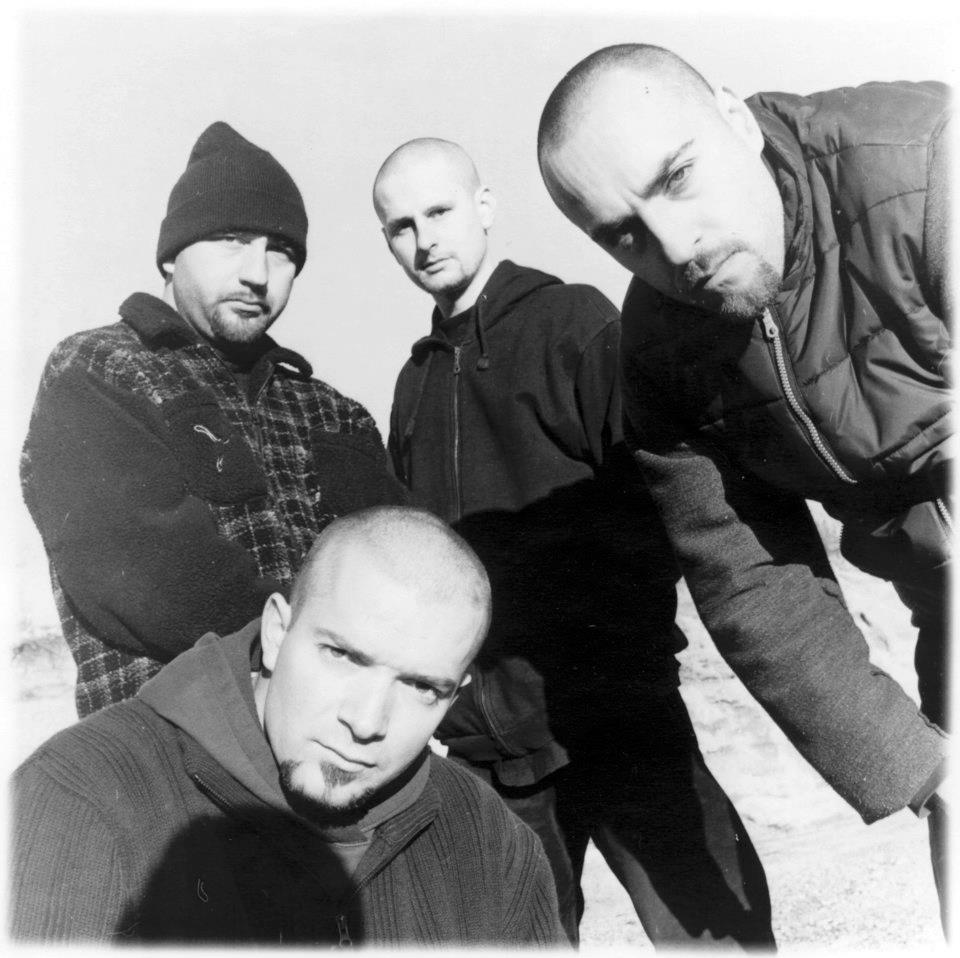

Background information
- Origin: Rijeka, Croatia
- Genres: Hip hop
- Years active: 1988–2001
- Labels: Channel Records; Denyken Music; Croatia; Dancing Bear
- Past members: DJ Pimp; DJ R-33 Rock; MC Condom X Gigi

Ugly Leaders was a Croatian hip hop group from Rijeka. They were the first rappers to release a hip hop album in Croatia as well as one of the first hip hop acts in the Southeastern Europe.

== History ==
The group was formed in 1988 by childhood friends David Jambreušić, Richard Lenac and Sadin Kruškić who took on the aliases DJ Pimp Tha Ho, DJ R-33 Rock and MC Condom X. They started recording their first material at the end of 1989 in a small studio in Opatija with the help of their former manager Damn Jay, but dissatisfied with the quality of the songs they moved into a better studio, where in 1991 they recorded material for the first Croatian hip-hop album Channel is Deep & Beech.

In 1992 they released Channel Is Deep & Beech through label's Channel Records and Damn Good Records. Their first music video was called Ugly Leaders Are Funny?. The music video was filmed using a borrowed VHS camera, and mixed in home production. Their second music video for the album was called Hardcore; the video was shown on HRT music show Hit Depo and was number 1 for eight months on the charts. Their third music video Panonian Beech was banned from TV due to censorship issues.

In 1993 Robert Grizlio aka Gigi joined the group and only a few months later DJ R left the group to pursue a career with his heavy metal band.

Their second album Prisoners Of Pain, co-produced by Denyken Music, who's been better known within Croatian rock circles, dropped in 1994 in conjunction between Denyken Records and Croatian major label Croatia Records. The album also had two official singles unlike the first album. Most of the album wasn't played on the radio due to languages and themes of the album. The same year there were the opening act to Public Enemy & Ice-T in Zagreb, the first American hip hop ambassadors to Croatia.

The following years saw them being active through compilation appearances, most notably Rijekkka's Most Wanted in 1995, and live performances both in their country and internationally. DJ R returned in 1996 but kept on with his involvement with the rock music scene alongside his hiphop membership.

During the end of the 1990s the Ugly Leaders were active on bringing the Croatian hip hop scene together and kept recording material. In 2000 they release an EP called 2000EP. After 2001 the group disbanded.

In 2008 DJ Pimp and DJ R appeared in a hip hop documentary titled Hip Hop Priča iz Hrvatske. They talked about the group and about the beginning of the Croatian hip hop scene.

== Discography ==
Studio Albums:

- Channel Is Deep & Beech (1992)
- Prisoners of Pain (1994)
- 2000EP (2000)

Singles:

- Svijet za Nas (RMX) (1994)
- Drop Your Pussy (1994)

Music Videos:

- Ugly Leaders Are Funny? (1992)
- Hardcore (1992)
- Panonian Beech (1992)
- 100% Cotton (ft. Rob-G) (1993)
- Svijet za Nas (RMX) (ft. Laufer) (1994)
- Drop Your Pussy (1994)
- On Da Mic (ft. Rob-G) (1997)
- Ruke u Zrak! (1999)
- Ruke u Zrak (RMX) (1999)
- Znaš Da (Tko je u Kući) (2000)

== Former members ==
- DJ Pimp - MC & DJ (1988–2001)
- MC Condom X - MC (1988–2001)
- DJ-R 33 Rock - MC & DJ (1988–1994, 1996-2001)
- Gigi - Production (1993-2001)
