= Father (band) =

Croatian metal band

- Origin: Rijeka, Croatia
- Genres: Alternative metal, nu metal
- Years active: 2000–present
- Labels: Dallas, Revol
- Members: Davor Tomić aka Pinky; Franjo Jardas; Dario Pažanin; Marko Jurić
- Past members: Mihael Prosen: Saša Vukosav; Ivan Bačić; Vedran Vučković
- Website: www.facebook.com/fatherband/

Father was a Croatian alternative metal band from Rijeka. The band was assembled in March 2000 by three members of the band Easyman. They released their debut album Inspirita on Dallas Records in October 2005 to critical and commercial acclaim. The band subsequently released the songs Cynosure and Machina as singles, both featured on the album.

== Career ==
During their career thus far, Father performed alongside the likes of Apocalyptica in 2003 and 2011, Anthrax in 2005, Sisters of Mercy in 2006, Korn in 2007, Skunk Anansie in 2010, Mastodon and Slayer in 2012.

The band later signed to Revol Records in 2006 in order to release Inspirita in the UK.

Following their frequent local and nationwide performances, the band made their first appearance outside the borders of ex Yugoslavia in October 2006, performing 13 shows across the UK, followed up by 4 more tours across the UK, the Netherlands and Austria during 2007 and 2008. During 2008 drummer Saša Vukosav left the band and was replaced by Marko Jurić, the member of the bands Belfast Food and Beatles Revival Band. In 2012 band plays on Bloodstock Open Air (B-O-A), the UK's biggest independent matal festival.

In the summer of 2009, Father released their cover of the Beatles classic "Eleanor Rigby", which was released in their native Croatia and was also played and held to high acclaim by Iron Maiden frontman Bruce Dickinson on his Friday night rock show on BBC Radio 6. The release of "Eleanor Rigby" was followed by the release of the single "Venus & Mars" serving as announcement for their new album which was due to be released later in 2010. The song experienced the same destiny as "Eleanor Rigby" and was broadcast on 21 May 2010 in the aforementioned show.

After a major time gap since the release of their debut album Inspirita, the band released a follow-up by the name of One Eon on 14 December 2010. The album consists of eleven tracks composed by the band and their cover of "Eleanor Rigby". When asked in an interview of the origin of album's name, the singer Mihael Prosen answered wittily: "It was named so because it took us that long (an eon) to make it!", and later pointed out that it has an actual meaning to the band but not disclosing it. The band held a promotional concert for the album on Christmas-Eve in their home town Rijeka. Soon after the release One Eon placed high on Croatian critic's choices for the best album of the year on what band responded that it seems like critics love the album more than they do as a band.

== Discography ==
- Inspirita (2005)
- One Eon (2010)
