= Tram 11 =

- Origin: Zagreb, Croatia
- Genres: Hip hop
- Years active: 1996–2003, 2017–present
- Members: General Woo, Target

Tram 11 is a Croatian rap group consisting of Nenad Šimun "Target" and Srđan Ćuk "General Woo". It is named after a tram line, number 11, that connects the western part of Zagreb from where Target is, with the eastern part where General Woo lived. It was one of the first prominent rap acts from Zagreb.

== History ==
The group formed in 1996. Croatian hip hop had few publicly recognized rappers until Tram 11 emerged in the "Blackout Project", a radio show started at "Radio 101" in 1993 to promote hip-hop and rap in Croatia.

The band's song "Hrvatski velikani" (Croatian Greats), referencing the important historical figures featured on Croatian currency, was the first rap song to hit number 1 on Croatian music top-lists.

The group's album Čovječe ne ljuti se (Man don't be angry) was released in 1999.

Its song "Kužiš Spiku" (You Understand the Slang) was subsequently included on the compilation The Best of International Hip-Hop.

The group disbanded in 2003, because the members got in a feud. Soon Target got schizophrenia and started recording solo. He dropped out "MC (album)", which was not successful, and likewise "The Album... Nastavak". General Woo dropped out his album with Nered, "Baš je lijep ovaj svijet" (This World is So Beautiful).

General Woo produced a commercial promo for Social Democratic Party of Croatia in 2005. In 2009, there was another brief revival for Tram 11 when General Woo appeared on Target's song "Stavi ovo na roštilj" (Put This on the Barbecue), which was featured on his solo album "Još jedan dan u Zagrebu" (One More Day in Zagreb). In 2010, Target and General Woo appeared in the documentary "Hip Hop priča iz Hrvatske", meaning Hip Hop story from Croatia.

== Comeback ==
On April 1, 2017, after 14 years of inactivity, Tram 11 announced a big comeback concert to be held on November 11, 2017, at Dom Sportova.

The duo caused controversies on few occasions over political stands, was in conflict for a long time and had not published a new song for 17 years, but came back together and announced plans to take part in anti-EURO campaign.

=== Jedan i jedan album release ===
On January 14, 2022, after a 22 year hiatus, the hip-hop duo released its new album "Jedan i jedan". It is their third studio album released under the record label Menart. It consists of 18 songs totaling over 50 minutes.

=== Reactions and media backlash ===
According to the review from one of Croatia's major music oriented websites Glazba.hr, it is "one of the most complete and controversial albums of modern Croatian hip-hop". Musical critic and Porin winner Hrvoje Horvat stated:

"Hip hop has remained the last valve for the delivery of rebellion, and the songs from "Jedan i jedan" show that this is no longer about youthful idealism from 25 years ago, but about observing and describing the situation around us that is crazier than any reality show. Like African-American rappers Tram 11, they are simple, politically incorrect and great."

Many journalists in the Croatian media commented on Tram 11 members, the album and the song "PŠK" citing politically incorrect statements and lyrics, especially from the song "PŠK". In the song, alongside general aimed at politicians and "the establishment", the duo calls the crimes at the Jasenovac camp a myth. Srđan Ćuk, singer of that specific line, later in an interview with Jutarnji List stated he believes the camp was indeed a labor camp although:

"We are not cheering for anyone in this story, we are cheering for science and for research, to do that research, to know exactly what happened. It bothers us that some have resistance to the research of Jasenovac. And we all know where mythology exists and where it comes from in the case of Jasenovac."

As a result of public backlash, on 24 January 2022 Menart Records apologized to the public and canceled its contract with Tram 11, withdrawing the album from physical and digital stores, which led to the group self-publishing the album under its newly founded "Pad Sistema Records" label, named after its song "Pad Sistema" from their 1999. album "Čovječe ne ljuti se".

The controversy sparked reactions from past and present members of the Croatian Parliament.

=== Founding of "Pad Sistema Records" ===
After Menart's canceled its contract with the hip-hop duo, Srđan Ćuk and Nenad Šimun founded their own record label named "Pad Sistema Records", the name derived from their song "Pad Sistema" from the album "Čovječe ne ljuti se". It is available on streaming platforms and physical CDs.

== Discography ==
=== Studio albums ===
- Čovječe ne ljuti se (Man, Don't Get Angry) (1999)
- Vrućina gradskog asfalta (Heat of the City Asphalt) (2000)
- Tajna crne kutije (Secret of the Black Box) (2003)
- Jedan i Jedan (One and One) (2022)

=== Compilations ===
- WorkshopCLASS Volume 11 (1998)
- Workshopclass#1 (2001)
- Workshopclass#2 (2002)
