= 2000 (EP) =

2000 EP by Ugly Leaders

EP by Ugly Leaders
- Released: 31 December 2000
- Recorded: 1996–2000
- Genre: Hip hop
- Length: 37:19
- Label: Dancing Bear
- Producer: DJ Pimp

Ugly Leaders chronology
Prisoners of Pain (1994)	2000 (2000)

Singles from 2000
- 1. "Ruke u Zrak!" Released: 1999; 2. "Tko je u Kući?" Released: 2000

Professional ratings
Review scores
Source	Rating
GlazbaMonitor	1/5 stars

2000 is the third and last release and only EP by the Croatian hip hop group, Ugly Leaders. The album was released on 31 December 2000.

== Background ==
The Intro was recorded in November 1994 at Dom Sportova when they were the opening act to Public Enemy, Ice-T and 5ive-O.

On Da Mic was taped in 1996.

Tko je u Kući? (RMX) lasts 3:45, then it's followed by silence until 10:54 then its starts playing an apocalyptic outro.

The album is dedicated to Maja Jakovlić (1974–1997).

== Track listing ==
No.	Title	Producer	Length
1.	"Intro by Chuck D (Public Enemy) & B-Wyze (5ive-O)"		0:24
2.	"Dobro Došli u Millennium"	DJ Pimp	3:38
3.	"Ruke u Zrak!"	DJ Pimp	3:05
4.	"Tko je u Kući?"	DJ Pimp	3:44
5.	"Bez Prestanka Prat"	DJ Pimp	3:52
6.	"Klopka" (skit)	DJ Pimp	0:18
7.	"Ne Možeš se Skriti"	DJ Pimp	3:32
8.	"Keep On"	DJ Pimp	2:33
9.	"On Da Mic" (featuring Rob-G)	Condom X, Rob-G & DJ Pimp	4:15
10.	"Tko je u Kući? (RMX)"	DJ Pimp	3:45
