= Marco Facoli =

Italian organist, harpsichordist and composer

Marco Facoli (c. 1540–1585), Venice, was an Italian organist, harpsichordist and composer.

== Works ==
- Il Primo Libro d’Intavolatura (1586), lost.
- Il Secondo Libro d’Intavolatura di Balli d’Arpichordo, Pass’e mezzi, Saltarelli, Padouane, Venice, 1588 (posthumous).
