= Podočnjaci =

Croatian band

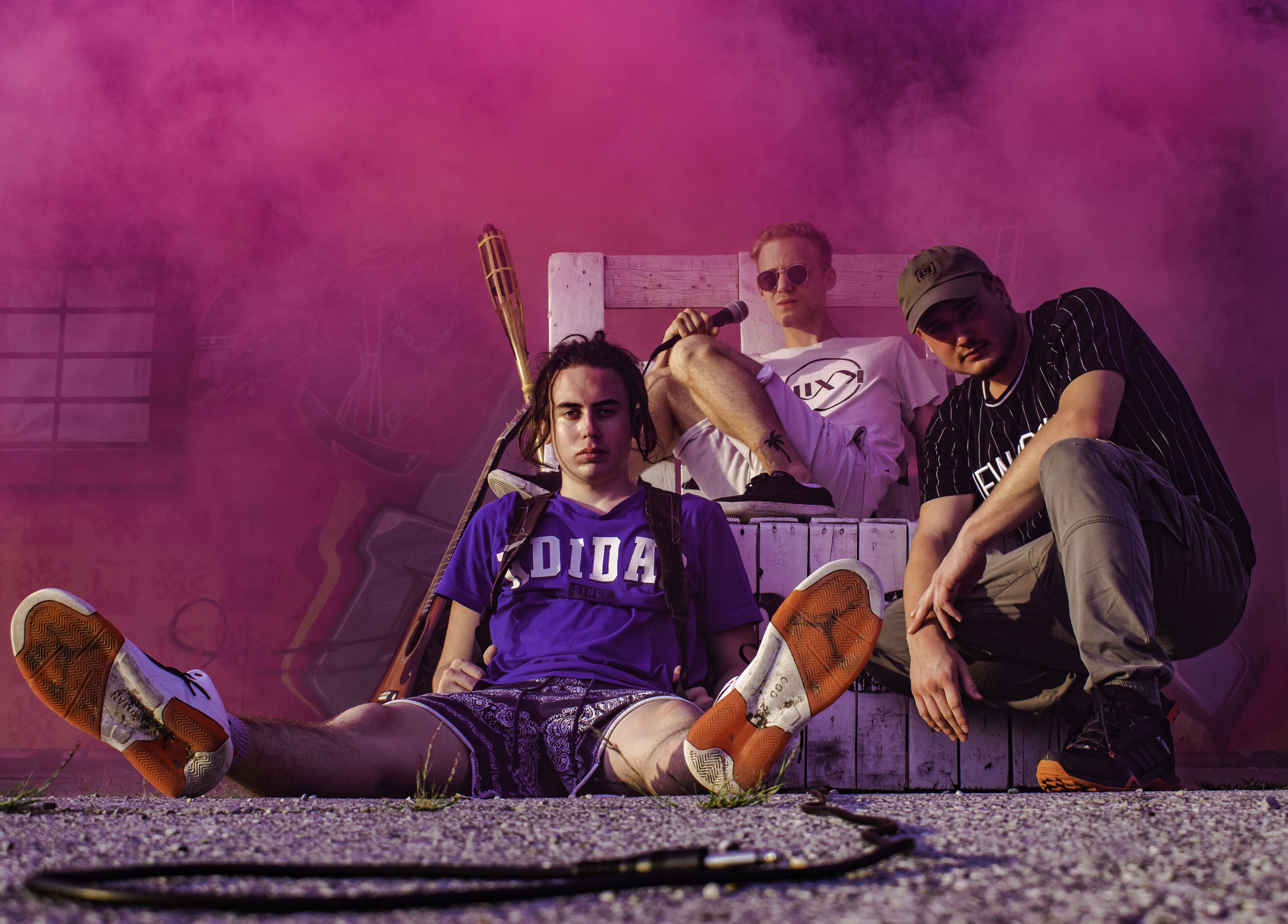
- Podočnjaci in 2020

Background information
- Origin: Kutina, Croatia
- Genres: Hip hop; house; trap; drum and bass; alternative pop
- Years active: 2020—present
- Members: Nix K; Rafael Lasic; Sinista Ruky
- Past members: beachboy19
- Website: podocnjacimusic.com

Podočnjaci are a Croatian electronic music group from Kutina, Croatia, consisting of beachboy19, Sinista Ruky and producer Nix K. They have been active since 2020. They attracted the attention of a wider audience with the singles "Šiške", "Papuče", "Predsoblje". The group's debut album Ispod očiju was released in 2021 through Yem.

It was with their first album when they reached the status of one of the favorite concert attractions of the new generation in Croatia, when in the spring of 2022 they held their first independent concert in the Tvornica Kulture in Zagreb, which was followed by performances at the 2022 edition of Zagreb Beer Fest, Beer Day in Karlovac, Beat na moru and others.

== Discography ==
=== Albums ===
Title	Details
Ispod očiju	Released: 21 July 2021; Label: yem; Formats: Digital download, streaming
Kako se riješiti Podočnjaka	Released: 17 January 2025; Label: yem; Formats: Digital download, streaming

=== Extended plays ===
Title	Details
Brzi	Released: 1 May 2022; Label: yem; Formats: Digital download, streaming
Intro	Released: 8 August 2022; Label: yem; Formats: Digital download, streaming
Remix Pack I	Released: 9 December 2022; Label: yem; Formats: Digital download, streaming

=== Singles ===
Title	Year	Album
"Snađi se"	2020	non-album singles
"Pozeru"	2020	non-album singles
"Tekst"	2020	non-album singles
"Šiške"	2020	non-album singles
"Papuče"	2021	non-album singles
"Pucamo"	2022	non-album singles
"I opet"	2022	non-album singles
"Predsoblje"	2022	non-album singles

== Awards and nominations ==
Year	Association	Category	Nominee / work	Result	Ref.
2021	Rock&Off Awards	Best Artist	Podočnjaci	Nominated	
