= Zdenac =

- Village
- Location within Croatia
- Coordinates: 45°15′N 15°20′E
- Country: Croatia
- County: Karlovac County
- City: Tounj

Area
  - Total: 7.3 km^{2} (2.8 sq mi)

Population (2021)
  - Total: 178
  - Density: 24/km^{2} (63/sq mi)
- Time zone: UTC+1 (CET)
  - Summer (DST): UTC+2 (CEST)
- Postal code: 47264
- Area code: +385 047

Zdenac is a village in Croatia, under the Tounj municipality, in Karlovac County.

== History ==
At 14:42 on 19 June 1942, a freight train with an Italian military guard carrying 26 cisterns and 1 flour wagon between Gornje Dubrave and Zdenac hit an extracted track, derailing as a result. The wagon loaded with flour caught on fire, partly burned and partly carried away by Partisans of the 1st battalion of the Second Kordun Detachment who had laid the barrier. The Partisans shot up the cisterns, which were later plugged up in Gornje Dubrave. Traffic on the line was stopped, and one Italian soldier was killed. The conductor and two fuellers were taken by the Partisans, and their fate remained unknown.

== Bibliography ==
- Trgo, Fabijan, ed. (1964). Zbornik dokumenata i podataka o Narodno-oslobodilačkom ratu Jugoslovenskih naroda. Vol. V, 32.
