= MC Buffalo =

Background information
- Also known as: Buffy, Bubke
- Born: Dejan Bubalo; June 17, 1971
- Origin: Rijeka, SFR Yugoslavia
- Died: December 5, 2012 (aged 41)
- Genres: Hip Hop
- Occupations: Rapper, MC
- Years active: 1991–2012
- Labels: D.J.-Team (1991-1995); Suzy Records (1992-1993)

Dejan Bubalo (June 17, 1971 – December 5, 2012) known better by his stage name, MC Buffalo, was a Croatian rapper.

== Early life and career ==
Dejan Bubalo was born on June 17, 1971, in Rijeka, SFR Yugoslavia. He grew up in the suburb of Zamet. Dejan started rapping in the mid 80's while in high school. In 1985 he joined a band called R.A.P. where he was the vocalist. Dejan rapped all over the streets of Rijeka. He got his stage name in 1989 when an American soldier could not pronounce his last name Bubalo and called him to Buffalo.

In 1991 Buffalo got acquainted with local producer Denis Pilepić, the two became great friend and started working together. In the spring of 1991 MC Buffalo released through D.J-Team Pilepićes label his debut solo album MC Buffalo's 1st Cut. The album was released on cassette tape. It was arguably one of the last hip hop albums made in Yugoslavia. During the beginnings of the Yugoslav Wars Buffalo alongside other Croatian musicians appeared on various patriotic compilations.

After the first album Buffalo and Pile started a Rap rock band called MC Buffalo & Maderfa'N'kerz alongside Robert Jovanović, Neven Novak and Đimi Grgić. The band became well known around Rijeka and its surrounding towns. In 1992 they released their first album titled Made in Rijeka. The rose to a bit of controversy due to a song called Moja Domovnica. The song was a parody of Moja domovina and was later the first song banned in Croatia. The next year record company Suzy Records and the band re-released Made in Rijeka with a couple of different songs. The same year Buffalo left the band.

In 1998 Buffalo with friends DJ Knockout and Skat formed old school hip hop group called Pol' Tone Rappa. They rapped over old school hip hop instrumental supplied by DJ Knockout. They became generally around Croatian hip hop circles. Later in 2001 he left group to join a group called L.S.D.. He was with the group until 2006.

== Last years and death ==
In 2007 Buffalo was featured in a song called Gradska by hip hop group Sirotinja D.O.O.. The song was dedicated to the city of Rijeka. In 2006 he featured in a Croatian documentary about hip hop in Croatia titled: Hip Hop Priča iz Hrvatske.

MC Buffalo was very sick for a long time. Apart from severe mental problems that were very difficult to carry, he lived with his mother in inhumane conditions. In 2011 his friends and colleagues organized a support concert for MC Buffalo in the club where he spent most of his career performing, Palach. The concert was a success and they raised 5000 kunas.

MC Buffalo died on December 5, 2012, at his home in Rijeka of a stroke.

== Personal life ==
MC Buffalo lived most of his life in the suburb of Vežica in Rijeka. He loved listening to old school hip hop, Reggae and Funk.

Buffalo expressed a great love for chess and was a very good player. Buffalo wrote rhymes in his passport and this prevented him from traveling.

== Tribute ==
Two days after Buffalo's death Rijeka football fans Armada at a game against Slaven Belupo paid tribute to Buffalo. In the 5th minute of the game they put up banners saying lyrics from his song Gradska: "Stihovi za tebe pod imenom-Gradska, MC Buffalo, počivaj u miru!"(Lyrics for you called-Gradska, MC Buffalo, rest in peace!).

A week after local Graffiti artist Ser made a graffiti in Rijeka with tribute to MC Buffalo.

In 2014 friends and local Graffiti artists Sec and Skat made a mural graffiti in tribute to MC Buffalo in Zamet.

== Discography ==
Studio Albums:

- MC Buffalo's 1st Cut (1991)
- Made in Rijeka (with Maderfa'N'kerz) (1992)
- Made in Rijeka (re-release) (with Maderfa'N'kerz)(1993)
