= Čovječe ne ljuti se =

Studio album by Tram 11
- Released: 1999
- Recorded: 1998–1999
- Genre: Hip-hop
- Length: 67:00
- Label: Menart
- Producers: Koolade, Dash

Tram 11 chronology
Project Impossible (1997)	Čovječe ne ljuti se (1999)	Vrućina Gradskog Asfalta (2000)

Singles from Čovječe ne Ljuti se
- 1. "Pad Sistema" Released: 1998; 2. "Kaj Ima Lima?" Released: 1999; 3. "Malu Na Stranu" Released: 1999

Čovječe ne ljuti se (English: Man don’t be angry) is the debut album by Croatian hip-hop duo Tram 11. The album was released in 1999 and had a major success. The album features production from Koolade and Dash and guest appearances on the album include El Bahattee, Phat Phillie, Major League Figures, Sick Rhyme Sayazz, Don Dovbje and Kiki. Some tracks (ex. "Kaj Ima Lima?") contain introductional inserts performed by Baby Dooks (of Sick Rhyme Sayazz) but he was not credited for that. The album was re-released in 2017 on Menart Records coinciding with a reunion tour.

== Track listing ==
No.	Title	Producer	Length
1.	"Čovječe, Ne Ljuti Se"	Koolade	4:09
2.	"Znaš Ko Sam"	Koolade	4:04
3.	"Kužiš Spiku" (featuring Phat Phillie)	Dash	4:46
4.	"Kaj Ima Lima?"	Koolade	4:53
5.	"Udri Brigu Na Veselje"	Koolade	4:09
6.	"Hrvatski Velikani 2"	Dash	4:46
7.	"Pismo 1" (featuring El Bahattee)	Dash	4:33
8.	"Pismo 2" (featuring El Bahattee)	Dash	4:32
9.	"Za Sve Oko Mene"	Koolade	4:13
10.	"Nema Škvadre" (featuring Major League Figures)	Koolade	4:17
11.	"Mokri Snovi (Remix)"	Koolade	4:11
12.	"Malu Na Stranu" (featuring Sick Rhyme Sayazz)	Dash	4:43
13.	"Ko Ti Čuva Leđa?" (featuring Don Dovbje and Kiki)	Dash	4:26
14.	"Lažni Frajeri"	Koolade	4:18
15.	"Lančana Reakcija"	Koolade (co-produced by Mistahorn)	4:42
16.	"Crna Kronika" (featuring El Bahattee)	Dash	4:46
17.	"Pad Sistema"	Dash	3:43
18.	"Mikrofon Provjeravam"	Koolade (scratches by DJ 279)	4:57
Total length:			1:20:07
