= Tajna crne kutije =

Tajna Crne Kutije (The Best Of)

Greatest hits album by Tram 11
- Released: 2003
- Recorded: 1995–2003
- Genre: Hip-hop
- Label: Menart
- Producers: Koolade, Dash

Tram 11 chronology
Vrućina gradskog asfalta (2000)	Tajna Crne Kutije (The Best Of) (2003)	Jedan i jedan (2022)

Singles from Tajna Crne Kutije (The Best Of)
- 1. "Jedno (Remix)" Released: 2002; 2. "Mi Smo Tu" Released: 2003; 3. "Veliki Odmor" Released: 2003; 4. "Bomba" Released: 2003

Tajna Crne Kutije (The Best Of) is a double album that features the best tracks of Tram 11. It was released in 2003. The first disc features Tram 11's greatest hits and 3 new tracks ("Veliki Odmor", "Mi Smo Tu" and "Bomba"), and the second disc features mostly rare and unreleased tracks or collaborations with other artists that were not released as a part of their own albums before.

== Track listing ==
=== Disc 1 ===
No.	Title	Producer	Length
1.	"Veliki Odmor"	Natko	3:28
2.	"Što Ćeš Sad"	Dash	3:26
3.	"Kaj Ima Lima?"	Koolade	4:56
4.	"Jedno"	Koolade	4:53
5.	"Hrvatski Velikani"	Dash	4:47
6.	"Malu Na Stranu" (featuring Bolesna Braća)	Dash	4:44
7.	"Samo Kod Nas" (featuring Čola)	Dash	4:26
8.	"Pad Sistema"	Koolade	4:44
9.	"Ti Čašpri Iskrivljeno" (featuring Renman)	Koolade	3:49
10.	"A Vi Svi"	Koolade	4:59
11.	"I Malu I Staru" (featuring Bolesna Braća and Ivana Kindl)	Baby Dooks	5:12
12.	"Mi Smo Tu"	Baby Dooks	4:43
13.	"Čovječe Ne Ljuti Se"	Koolade	4:10
14.	"Vrućina Gradskog Asfalta"	Koolade	4:48
15.	"Rokalice" (featuring Bolesna Braća)	Baby Dooks	3:53
16.	"Udri Brigu Na Veselje"	Koolade	4:46
17.	"Bomba" (featuring Baby Dooks)	Dash	3:12
Total length:			1:14:55

=== Disc 2 ===
No.	Title	Producer	Length
1.	"Jedno (Remix)" (featuring KC Da Rookee)	Koolade	2:57
2.	"Sve Što Si Mi Ti" (featuring Divas)	Dash	2:42
3.	"Dez Mozges" (featuring Blackout Project)	Koolade	1:50
4.	"981" (El Bahattee)	Koolade	2:23
5.	"ZG Tag"	Shot	2:15
6.	"Lopovi" (featuring Xed)	Xed	2:18
7.	"Vatre Se Pale (Remix)" (featuring Krivično Djelovanje)	Natko	3:03
8.	"Kog Je Briga (Summer Breeze Remix)" (featuring Frx)	Frx	1:00
9.	"Ulično Znanje"	Koolade	2:42
10.	"Stilska Mafija" (featuring Renman and Bolesna Braća)	Renman	4:14
11.	"Superista"	Frx	3:06
12.	"Lagana Tema" (featuring Bolesna Braća)	Frx	2:34
13.	"Noćas Se Brije" (featuring Mob Thugz)	Natko	4:23
14.	"A Vi Svi (Remix)" (featuring Remi, La Bla, El Bahattee, Nered and Bizzo)	Koolade	4:11
15.	"Znaš Znanje" (featuring Elemental)	Shot	3:36
16.	"Top 10" (featuring Mandril)	Mandril	1:54
17.	"Čisto Ludilo" (featuring Doppler Efekt)	Shala	4:22
18.	"Rima Koja Slijedi"	Shot	4:12
19.	"Tram 11" (featuring Prljavo Kazalište)	Shot	1:20
20.	"Za Dvoje" (featuring XL)	D'Knock	1:30
21.	"Verbalator"	Shot	2:10
22.	"Mokri Snovi" (featuring Baby Dooks)	Koolade	1:23
23.	"Malo Ljubavi" (featuring Ivana Kindl)	Shala	1:12
24.	"10000" (featuring El Bahattee and Stupni)	Frx	3:29
25.	"Početak Kraja" (featuring BFW)	Joso	4:07
26.	"Hrvatski Velikani 1" (featuring Shot)	Shot	4:31
Total length:			1:13:24
