= Vrućina gradskog asfalta =

Studio album by Tram 11
- Released: December 19th 2000
- Recorded: 1999–2000
- Genre: Hip-hop
- Length: 77:27
- Label: Menart
- Producers: Koolade, Dash, Baby Dooks

Tram 11 chronology
Čovječe ne ljuti se (1999)	Vrućina gradskog asfalta (2000)	Tajna crne kutije (2003)

Singles from Vrućina Gradskog Asfalta
- 1. "Nit života" Released: 1999; 2. "A vi svi" Released: 1999; 3. "Vrućina gradskog asfalta" Released: 2000; 4. "Samo kod nas" Released: 2000; 5. "Jedno" Released: 2000

Vrućina gradskog asfalta is the second studio album by the Croatian hip-hop duo, Tram 11. The album was released on December 19, 2000. Guest appearances on the album feature Prva Petorka, Ivana Husar, XL, Ink, Bolesna Braća (aka Sick Rhyme Sayazz), Čola, Ivana Kindl and Renman. The album includes production from Dash, Koolade and Baby Dooks.

== Track listing ==
No.	Title	Producer	Length
1.	"Intro"		0:11
2.	"Prvo i osnovno"	Dash	3:56
3.	"Skit 1" (skit)		0:15
4.	"Nisi pazio"	Koolade	4:25
5.	"Politiziranje" (featuring Prva Petorka)	Koolade	4:24
6.	"A vi svi"	Koolade	4:57
7.	"Skit 2" (skit)		0:04
8.	"Zlo i naopako"	Koolade	4:04
9.	"Vrućina gradskog asfalta"	Koolade	4:47
10.	"Nit života"	Dash	4:33
11.	"Crni dani"	Koolade	5:27
12.	"Za 10 godina" (featuring Ivana Husar)	Koolade	4:47
13.	"Ljubomora je kurva" (featuring XL)	Koolade	4:27
14.	"Skit 3" (skit)		0:25
15.	"Samizam" (featuring Ink and Ivana Husar)	Koolade	4:27
16.	"I malu i staru" (featuring Bolesna Braća and Ivana Kindl)	Baby Dooks	5:11
17.	"Rokalice" (featuring Baby Dooks)	Baby Dooks	3:53
18.	"Samo kod nas" (featuring Čola)	Dash	4:25
19.	"Eto šta ima" (featuring Baby Dooks)	Koolade	3:39
20.	"Ti čašpri iskrivljeno" (featuring Renman)	Koolade	3:48
21.	"Jedno"	Koolade	5:10
Total length:			1:17:15
