= Stoka =

Croatian rapper and TV host (born 1981)

Marin Ivanović (Croatian pronunciation: [mâriːn ǐʋanoʋit͡ɕ]; born 24 June 1981), better known by his stage name Stoka ([stôka], Croatian for 'cattle'), is a Croatian rapper artist who used to be the half of the duo, Nered & Stoka. He stems from the Zagreb neighborhood of Kvatrić. In 2005, Stoka was host of the Croatian version of The Bar reality show, which aired on Nova TV. In 2007, Stoka spent several months in a therapeutic community to fight his cocaine addiction.
